= The Boys in the Boat (film) =

2023 American film by George Clooney

- Theatrical release poster
- Directed by: George Clooney
- Screenplay by: Mark L. Smith
- Based on: The Boys in the Boat by Daniel James Brown
- Produced by: Grant Heslov; George Clooney
- Starring: Joel Edgerton; Callum Turner; Peter Guinness; Jack Mulhern; James Wolk; Hadley Robinson; Courtney Henggeler
- Cinematography: Martin Ruhe
- Edited by: Tanya M. Swerling
- Music by: Alexandre Desplat
- Production companies: Metro-Goldwyn-Mayer; Smokehouse Pictures; Spyglass Media Group (Note: Credited in the main film); Tempesta Films; Anonymous Content
- Distributed by: Amazon MGM Studios
- Release dates: December 7, 2023 (SIFF Cinema Downtown); December 25, 2023 (United States)
- Running time: 124 minutes
- Country: United States
- Language: English
- Budget: $40 million
- Box office: $55.5 million

The Boys in the Boat is a 2023 American biographical sports drama film produced and directed by George Clooney from a screenplay by Mark L. Smith, based on the 2013 book by Daniel James Brown. The film follows the University of Washington rowing team, and their quest to compete in the 1936 Summer Olympics. It stars Joel Edgerton as coach Al Ulbrickson Sr. and Callum Turner as rower Joe Rantz.

The Boys in the Boat had its world premiere in Los Angeles on December 11, 2023, and was theatrically released by Amazon MGM Studios in the United States on December 25 and internationally by Warner Bros. Pictures. It grossed $55 million and received mixed reviews from critics.

== Plot ==
As elderly Joe Rantz watches his grandson rowing a fiberglass boat, he recalls his glorious rowing days. In 1936, Joe is a poor engineering student at the University of Washington (UW), living in an abandoned car and eating canned food, with no job and tuition fees due in two weeks. Fellow struggling student Roger Morris tells Joe the 8+ rowing team comes with jobs and boarding. Despite not being rowers, they make the UW junior varsity (JV) team in a special year for coach Al Ulbrickson, who is under pressure to beat rival Cal and compete for the 1936 Olympics. Joe and Roger are just happy to have a dorm room and steady food, and gladly mop floors for tuition. Joe starts dating Joyce, a classmate, and admits to racing-shell builder George Pocock that he has been on his own since his father abandoned him at age fourteen.

The JV and varsity 8+ teams train together, trying to get their rowing "swing" in sync with fast pace. Coach Al worries that his varsity crew isn't fast enough for the Olympics, and the JVs are strong but inexperienced. On George's suggestion, Al brings back Bobby Moch, the experienced but headstrong coxswain, warning him to follow orders on the JVs or he is out. At the Pacific Coast Regatta on Lake Washington, UW and Cal race two miles in front of 100,000 fans. Coach Al wants the JV boat to maintain a steady pace, hoping the Cal JVs would screw up, but Bobby calls a fast pace and pulls off a course-record win, astonishing Al. The rowers become campus stars.

Ahead of the four-mile Poughkeepsie Regatta in New York, for a berth in the Olympics, Al risks his job by promoting the JVs above his experienced varsity boat. After seeing his estranged father in Seattle, Joe performs badly in New York practice and is benched. Joe packs up to leave, but George Pocock tells him not to quit like his father. Joe reconsiders and agrees with Al that it is all about the boat, the only thing he has. On race day, Bobby is told by Al to start slowly and let the other boats tire, then kick mid-race to 35 strokes per minute. Bobby starts at 28 and holds it past mid-race, then coaxes 36, with a 40-stroke finish to lead ragtag UW to upset Navy, Cal, and the other privileged schools.

The US Olympic Committee is short on funds, so the UW needs to raise $5,000 (equivalent to $116,000 in 2025) to pay for their travel, otherwise a team able to pay will go. The team and community raise the money, with the final funds coming from a supportive Ebright and Cal program, and they sail for Berlin. In Nazi Germany, stroke oarsman Don Hume falls sick. At the opening ceremony, Roger tells Jesse Owens to show the Germans that he's the fastest guy in the world. Owens replies, "not the Germans, the folks back home". The rowing team then sets an Olympic record in the qualifier, but the effort takes a toll on Hume. Al protests about the lane assignments, but realizes he'll have calm water at the end, so he calls for a fast start to stay close to the German team, with a big kick to finish. Hitler attends the finals expecting his team to complete a German gold-medal sweep of the rowing events. Bobby fails to hear the final's starting gun and starts badly, with Hume struggling early; nonetheless, Bobby coaxes Hume and the crew to 42 strokes per minute to get within reach, then calls for 46 with 300 meters to go. The US wins the gold in a photo finish over Italy and Germany. Back in the present, the elderly Joe comes out of his reverie and tells his grandson that his eight-man crew was always one.

== Cast ==
- Joel Edgerton as Al Ulbrickson, rowing coach at the University of Washington
- Callum Turner as Joe Rantz, a rower at the University of Washington
  - Ian McElhinney as old Joe
- Peter Guinness as George Pocock
- Jack Mulhern as Don Hume
- James Wolk as UW assistant coach Thomas Bolles
- Hadley Robinson as Joyce Simdars, Joe Rantz's girlfriend and later wife
- Courtney Henggeler as Hazel Ulbrickson, Al's wife. It was her final film role before her retirement from acting in 2025.
- Chris Diamantopoulos as Royal Brougham
- Sam Strike as Roger Morris
- Alec Newman as Joe's father Harry Rantz
- Luke Slattery as Bobby Moch
- Thomas Elms as Chuck Day
- Thomas Stephen Varey as Johnny White
- Bruce Herbelin-Earle as Shorty Hunt
- Wil Coban as Jim McMillin
- Joel Phillimore as Gordy Adam
- Edward Baker-Duly as UW committee member Benjamin Billings
- Jack Staddon as Bo Billings
- Adrian Lukis as Jay Ellis
- Glenn Wrage as Cal Coach Ky Ebright
- Dominic Tighe as UW assistant Coach Brown
- Jyuddah Jaymes as Jesse Owens
- Jacob James Beswick as Harvey Love
- Frankie Fox as Glenn Morry
- Sam Douglas as Chairman Henry Burke
- Robert Morgan as Professor Stone
- Andrew Bridgmont as Heinrich Pauli
- Daniel Philpott as Adolf Hitler
- Nicholas Cass-Beggs as German Coach
- Nick Tajan as German Coxswain
- David Stoller as Lumber Foreman
- Austin Haynes as Joe's Grandson

== Production ==
=== Development ===
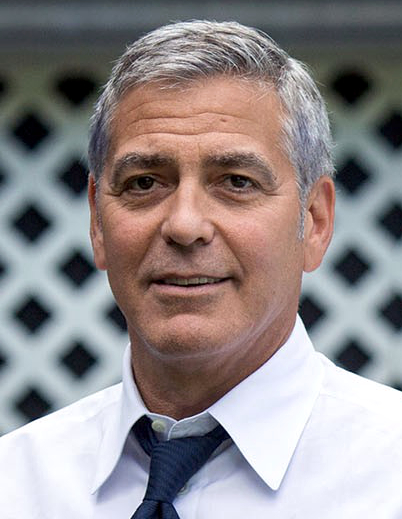
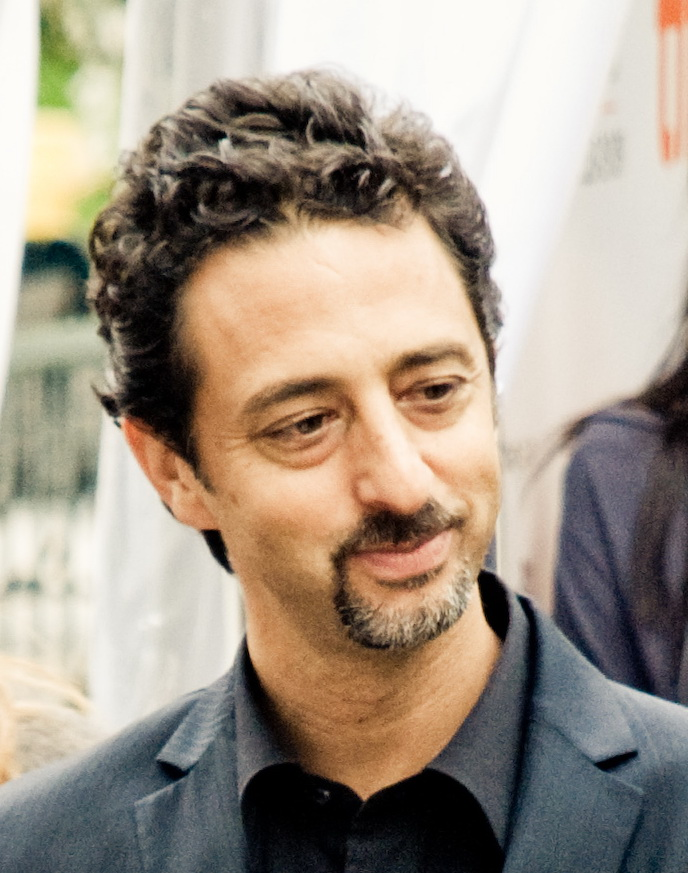
Director and co-producer George Clooney (left) and co-producer Grant Heslov

In March 2011, The Weinstein Company preemptively acquired the film adaptation rights to the book by Daniel James Brown with Kenneth Branagh set to direct and Donna Gigliotti and Judy Hofflund producing. In October 2018, Lantern Entertainment, which acquired The Weinstein Company's assets, contracted with Metro-Goldwyn-Mayer Pictures to distribute the film worldwide. In March 2020, it was announced that George Clooney would direct and produce with Grant Heslov and Mark L. Smith would write the script.

=== Casting ===
In November 2021, it was announced that Callum Turner would portray Joe Rantz. In February 2022, additional casting was announced, including Joel Edgerton and Hadley Robinson. Courtney Henggeler and James Wolk joined in March, and Chris Diamantopoulos joined in April.

=== Filming ===
Principal photography began in March 2022, and was due to take place at Winnersh Film Studios in Berkshire, as well as in Los Angeles and Berlin. The 1936 Summer Olympics and scenes around the University of Washington boathouse were filmed on the Cleveland Lakes in the Cotswold Water Park near Swindon (UK), with additional scenes filmed at Molesey Boat Club, and at Pinewood Studios. Members of various boat clubs in the area, such as St Hugh's Boat Club, Merton College Boat Club, The Queen's College Boat Club, Walbrook Rowing Club and Oriel College Boat Club from the University of Oxford, were recruited as rowers for various national teams in the Olympics. Additional filming was done at Ashlyns School for many of the scenes set inside the University of Washington.

=== Music ===
The film score was composed by Alexandre Desplat. The soundtrack was released digitally by Sony Classical on December 22, 2023.

== Release ==
The Boys in the Boat was first screened at the reopened SIFF Cinerama Downtown in Seattle on December 7, 2023. The screening was attended by a number of students from Sequim, Washington, where Joe Rantz was from. This was followed by the film's official world premiere at the Samuel Goldwyn Theater in Los Angeles on December 11, 2023.

It was released by Amazon MGM Studios on December 25, 2023. In the United Kingdom, it was released by Warner Bros. Pictures on January 12, 2024.

=== Home media ===
The Boys in the Boat was released for digital platforms on January 16, 2024 and on Blu-Ray on June 25, 2024.

== Reception ==
=== Box office ===
In the United States and Canada, The Boys in the Boat was released alongside Ferrari and The Color Purple, and was projected to gross $2–3 million from 2,557 theaters on its first day. It ended up making $5.7 million, finishing in eighth at the box office. The following weekend the film made $8.3 million, finishing in sixth at the box office and totaling $21.9 million over its first week of release. In the film's second weekend it made $6 million, remaining in sixth.

=== Critical response ===
On the review aggregator website Rotten Tomatoes, 58% of 156 critics' reviews are positive, with an average rating of 6.1/10. The website's consensus reads: "The Boys in the Boat tells its inspirational true story with heart and solid craftsmanship, but director George Clooney's solidly traditional approach prevents it from leaving much of an impact." Metacritic, which uses a weighted average, assigned the film a score of 54 out of 100, based on 35 critics, indicating "mixed or average" reviews. Audiences polled by CinemaScore gave the film an average grade of "A" on an A+ to F scale, while PostTrak reported 86% filmgoers gave it a positive score.

Sheri Linden of The Hollywood Reporter wrote, "At times The Boys in the Boat could have used more of an edge. But like the Huskies, it gets the job done, stumbling sometimes but mostly assured." Bilge Ebiri of Vulture called the film "an unshowy but slick underdog sports picture, fluidly told and elegantly mounted." The Messenger's Jordan Hoffman gave the film a score of 6.2/10, writing, "'It's a bit old fashioned' is the primary takeaway most have from The Boys in the Boat, and what that really means is low-stakes, relaxing and predictable, but also basically good."

CNN's Brian Lowry wrote, "the movie can't really escape the whirlpool-like drag of its earnest familiarity, paddling around in a middle lane that doesn't rival the most stirring practitioners of this well-worn genre." The Guardian's Peter Bradshaw gave the film 2/5 stars, writing, "Clooney is capable of putting much more on the scoreboard; this feels like an animatronic museum display."
