= Australia at the 1936 Summer Olympics =

- IOC code: AUS
- NOC: Australian Olympic Federation

in Berlin
- Competitors: 32 (28 men, 4 women) in 7 sports
- Flag bearer: Dunc Gray
- Medals Ranked 30th: Gold 0 Silver 0 Bronze 1 Total 1

Summer Olympics appearances (overview)
- 1896; 1900; 1904; 1908; 1912; 1920; 1924; 1928; 1932; 1936; 1948; 1952; 1956; 1960; 1964; 1968; 1972; 1976; 1980; 1984; 1988; 1992; 1996; 2000; 2004; 2008; 2012; 2016; 2020; 2024

Other related appearances
- 1906 Intercalated Games –––– Australasia (1908–1912)

Australia competed at the 1936 Summer Olympics in Berlin, Germany. 32 competitors, 28 men and 4 women, took part in 26 events in 7 sports. Australian athletes have competed in every Summer Olympic Games. In terms of medals won Berlin 1936 was Australia's poorest result at the Summer Olympics, winning just a single bronze in the Men's triple jump.

== Medalist ==
The following Australian competitor won a medal at the games.

| Medal | Name | Sport | Event | Date |
|---|---|---|---|---|
| Bronze | Jack Metcalfe | Athletics | Men's triple jump | 6 August 1936 |

== Athletics ==
Key

- Note–Ranks given for track events are within the athlete's heat only
- Q = Qualified for the next round
- q = Qualified for the next round as a fastest loser or, in field events, by position without achieving the qualifying target
- NR = National record
- N/A = Round not applicable for the event
- Bye = Athlete not required to compete in round
- NP = Not placed

Men
Track & road events

| Athlete | Event | Heat | | Semifinal | | Final | |
| Athlete | Event | Result | Rank | Result | Rank | Result | Rank |
|---|---|---|---|---|---|---|---|
| Gerald Backhouse | 800 m | 1:57.7 | 1 Q | 1:53.2 | 2 Q | | 8 |
| Gerald Backhouse | 1500 m | | 7 | did not advance | | | |
| Alf Watson | 110 m hurdles | 15.1 | 4 | did not advance | | | |
| Alf Watson | 400 m hurdles | 54.5 | 3 | did not advance | | | |

Men
Field Events

| Athlete | Event | Qualification | | Final | |
| Athlete | Event | Distance | Position | Distance | Position |
|---|---|---|---|---|---|
| Jack Metcalfe | high jump | 1.85 | 1T Q | 1.85 | 12 |
| Jack Metcalfe | triple jump | | Q | 15.50 | 3rd place, bronze medalist(s) |
| Basil Dickinson | triple jump | | Q | 14.48 | 16 |

Women
Field Events

| Athlete | Event | Final | |
| Athlete | Event | Distance | Position |
|---|---|---|---|
| Doris Carter | high jump | 1.55 | 6T |

== Boxing ==
Men

| Athlete | Event | Round of 32 | Round of 16 | Quarterfinals | Semifinals | Final | |
| Athlete | Event | Opposition Result | Opposition Result | Opposition Result | Opposition Result | Opposition Result | Rank |
|---|---|---|---|---|---|---|---|
| Henry Cooper | flyweight | Sobkowiak (POL); L KO2 | did not advance | | | | |
| Leonard Cook | welterweight | Pisarski (POL); W PTS | Suvio (FIN); L PTS | did not advance | | | |
| Leslie Harley | light heavyweight | van Bueren (SUI); W PTS | Havelka (TCH); L PTS | did not advance | | | |

== Cycling ==
Men
Road race

| Cyclist | Event | Final | |
| Cyclist | Event | Result | Rank |
|---|---|---|---|
| Tassy Johnson | Road race | 2:33:08 | 16T |
| Chris Wheeler | Road race | Unknown | |

Track

Ranks given are within the heat.

| Cyclist | Event | First round | | First repechage | | Second round | | Quarterfinals | | Semifinals | | Final | |
| Cyclist | Event | Result | Rank | Result | Rank | Result | Rank | Result | Rank | Result | Rank | Result | Rank |
|---|---|---|---|---|---|---|---|---|---|---|---|---|---|
| Dunc Gray | Sprint | | 2 | 13.0 | 1 Q | 12.2 | 1 Q | | 2 | did not advance | | | 5 |
| Tassy Johnson | Time trial | n/a | | | | | | | | | | 1:15.8 | 11 |

== Diving ==
| Diver | Event | Final | |
| Diver | Event | Points | Rank |
|---|---|---|---|
| Ron Masters | 3 m springboard | 115.72 | 14 |
| Ron Masters | 10 m platform | 86.95 | 15 |

== Rowing ==
Australia had 12 rowers participate in three out of seven rowing events in 1936.

Ranks given are within the heat.

| Rower | Event | First round | | Repechage | | Semifinals | | Final | |
| Rower | Event | Result | Rank | Result | Rank | Result | Rank | Result | Rank |
|---|---|---|---|---|---|---|---|---|---|
| Cecil Pearce | Single sculls | 7:27.0 | 4 r | 7:33.2 | 2 | did not advance | | | |
| Bill Dixon; Herb Turner | Double sculls | 6:55.6 | 4 | —N/a | | 7:58.8 | 1 | 7:45.1 | 6 |
| Len Einsaar; Joe Gould; Mervyn Wood; Walter Jordan; George Elias; Wal Mackney; William Cross; Don Ferguson; Norman Ella | Eight | | 4 r | —N/a | | 6:55.1 | 2 | did not advance | |

== Swimming ==
Men

Ranks given are within the heat.

| Swimmer | Event | Heats | | Semifinals | | Final | |
| Swimmer | Event | Result | Rank | Result | Rank | Result | Rank |
|---|---|---|---|---|---|---|---|
| Bill Kendall | 100 m freestyle | 1:01.0 | 3 q | 59.9 | 5 | Did not advance | |
| Percy Oliver | 100 m backstroke | 1:10.2 | 2 Q | 1:09.4 | 3 Q | 1:10.7 | 7 |

Women

Ranks given are within the heat.

| Swimmer | Event | Heats | | Semifinals | | Final | |
| Swimmer | Event | Result | Rank | Result | Rank | Result | Rank |
|---|---|---|---|---|---|---|---|
| Evelyn de Lacy | 100 m freestyle | 1:08.5 | 2 Q | 1:10.0 | 5 | Did not advance | |
| Kitty Mackay | 100 m freestyle | 1:13.8 | 5 | Did not advance | | | |
| Evelyn de Lacy | 400 m freestyle | 5:51.9 | 5 Q | Did not advance | | | |
| Kitty Mackay | 100 m backstroke | 1:24.6 | 5 | Did not advance | | | |
| Pat Norton | 100 m backstroke | 1:22.3 | 4 Q | 1:21.9 | 6 | Did not advance | |

== Wrestling ==
Freestyle wrestling
Men's

| Athlete | Event | Round 1 | Round 2 | Round 3 | Round 4 | Final | |
| Athlete | Event | Opposition Result | Opposition Result | Opposition Result | Opposition Result | Opposition Result | Rank |
|---|---|---|---|---|---|---|---|
| Dick Garrard | lightweight | Romagnoli (ITA); L | Kárpáti (HUN); L | did not advance | | | |
| John O'Hara | welterweight | Paar (GER); L | Samec (TCH); W | Andersson (SWE); L | did not advance | | |
| Eddie Scarf | light heavyweight | Beke (BEL); W | Prokop (TCH); L | Siebert (GER); L | did not advance | | 6 |
