= Rowing at the 1936 Summer Olympics – Men's eight =

Men's eight at the Games of the XI Olympiad
- Rowing pictogram
- Venue: Grünau Regatta Course
- Dates: 12–14 August 1936
- Competitors: 126 from 14 nations
- Winning time: 6:25.4

Medalists
1st place, gold medalist(s)		United States: Herbert Morris; Charles Day; Gordon Adam; John White; James McMillin; George Hunt; Joe Rantz; Donald Hume; Robert Moch (cox)
2nd place, silver medalist(s)		Italy: Guglielmo Del Bimbo; Dino Barsotti; Oreste Grossi; Enzo Bartolini; Mario Checcacci; Dante Secchi; Ottorino Quaglierini; Enrico Garzelli; Cesare Milani (cox)
3rd place, bronze medalist(s)		Germany: Alfred Rieck; Helmut Radach; Hans Kuschke; Heinz Kaufmann; Gerd Völs; Werner Loeckle; Hans-Joachim Hannemann; Herbert Schmidt; Wilhelm Mahlow (cox)

The men's eight competition at the 1936 Summer Olympics took place at Grünau Regatta Course in Berlin, Germany. The event was held from 12 to 14 August, and was won by a United States crew from the University of Washington. There were 14 boats (126 competitors) from 14 nations, with each nation limited to a single boat in the event. The victory was the fifth consecutive gold medal in the event for the United States and seventh overall; the Americans had won every time they competed (missing 1908 and 1912). Italy repeated as silver medalists. Germany earned its first medal in the men's eight since 1912 with its bronze. Canada's three-Games podium streak ended.

Rowing events were dominated by the hosts, Germany, who medaled in every event and took five of the seven gold medals. The final race, men's eights, was won by a working-class United States team from the University of Washington who, in what had become their trademark, started slow and outsprinted the competition to an exceedingly close finish, with only one second separating the top three finishers at the end of a six-and-a-half minute race. This event is chronicled in The Boys in the Boat written by Daniel James Brown, which later became a film of the same name.

== Background ==
This was the ninth Olympic appearance of the event. Rowing had been on the programme in 1896 but was cancelled due to bad weather. The men's eight has been held every time that rowing has been contested, beginning in 1900.

The United States was the dominant nation in the event, having won the previous four Olympic men's eight competitions (as well as the other two competitions which the United States had entered). The American crew this year came from the University of Washington, which had won the 1936 Intercollegiate Rowing Association Regatta. Switzerland had won the 1936 Grand Challenge Cup. Hungary had won the 1933, 1934, and 1935 European championships. The Australian crew was all police crew from the New South Wales Policeman's Rowing Club in Sydney who had dominated at state titles for the previous two years. They were selected in toto with their attendance funded by the NSW Police Federation.

Yugoslavia made its debut in the event. Canada, Great Britain, and the United States each made their seventh appearance, tied for most among nations to that point.

== Competition format ==
The "eight" event featured nine-person boats, with eight rowers and a coxswain. It was a sweep rowing event, with the rowers each having one oar (and thus each rowing on one side). The course used the 2000 metres distance that became the Olympic standard in 1912.

The 1936 competition had a six-boat final for the first time. The competition continued to use the three-round format used in 1932, with two main rounds (semifinals and a final) and a repechage.

- The semifinals placed the 14 boats in 3 heats, with 4 or 5 boats per heat. The winner of each heat (3 boats total) advanced directly to the final, while the other boats (11 total) went to the repechage.
- The repechage had 11 boats. They were placed in 3 heats, with 3 or 4 boats each. The winner of each repechage heat (3 boats) rejoined the semifinal winners in the final, with the other boats (8 total) eliminated.
- The final round consisted of a single final for the medals and 4th through 6th place.

== Schedule ==
Date	Time	Round
Wednesday, 12 August 1936	17:15	Semifinals
Thursday, 13 August 1936	18:15	Repechage
Friday, 14 August 1936	18:00	Final

== Results ==
=== Semifinals ===
12 August. The first boat in each heat advanced directly to final. The other boats competed again in the repechage for remaining spots in the final.

==== Semifinal 1 ====
Rank	Rowers	Coxswain	Nation	Time	Notes
1	Herbert Morris; Charles Day; Gordon Adam; John White; James McMillin; George Hunt; Joe Rantz; Donald Hume	Robert Moch	United States	6:00.8	Q
2	Tom Askwith; Ran Laurie; John Cherry; Hugh Mason; McAllister Lonnon; Annesley Kingsford; Desmond Kingsford; John Couchman	Noel Duckworth	Great Britain	6:02.1	R
3	Émile Lecuirot; Louis Devillié; Henri Souharce; Alphonse Bouton; Camille Becanne; Bernard Batillat; Jean Cottez; Marcel Charletoux	Claude Lowenstein	France	6:11.6	R
4	Tadashi Negishi; Masaru Kashiwahara; Shusui Sekigawa; Isamu Mita; Osamu Kitamura; Haruyoshi Nakagawa; Takeo Hori; Yoshiteru Suzuki	Tadashi Shimijima	Japan	6:12.3	R
5	Karel Brandstätter; Pavel Parák; Jan Holobrádek; Ladislav Smolík; František Kšír; František Kobzík; Rudolf Baránek; Antonín Hrstka	Bedřich Procházka	Czechoslovakia	6:28.6	R

==== Semifinal 2 ====
Rank	Rowers	Coxswain	Nation	Time	Notes
1	Pál Domonkos; Sándor von Korompay; Hugó Ballya; Imre Kapossy; Antal Szendey; Gábor Alapy; Frigyes Hollósi; László Szabó	Ervin Kereszthy	Hungary	6:07.1	Q
2	Guglielmo Del Bimbo; Dino Barsotti; Oreste Grossi; Enzo Bartolini; Mario Checcacci; Dante Secchi; Ottorino Quaglierini; Enrico Garzelli	Cesare Milani	Italy	6:10.1	R
3	Cedric Liddell; Grey McLeish; Joseph Harris; Ben Sharpe; Jack Cunningham; Charles Matteson; Harry Fry; Sandy Saunders	Les MacDonald	Canada	6:14.3	R
4	Len Einsaar; Joe Gould; Mervyn Wood; Walter Jordan; George Elias; Wal Mackney; William Cross; Don Ferguson	Norman Ella	Australia	6:21.9	R
5	Arno Franzen; Maximo Fava; Ernesto Sauter; Alfredo de Baer; Frederico Tadewald; Henrique Kranen; Nilo Franzen; Lauro Franzen	Rodolpho Rath	Brazil	6:33.2	R

==== Semifinal 3 ====
Rank	Rowers	Coxswain	Nation	Time	Notes
1	Werner Schweizer; Fritz Feldmann; Rudolf Homberger; Oskar Neuenschwander; Hermann Betschart; Hans Homberger; Alex Homberger; Karl Schmid	Rolf Spring	Switzerland	6:08.4	Q
2	Alfred Rieck; Helmut Radach; Hans Kuschke; Heinz Kaufmann; Gerd Völs; Werner Loeckle; Hans-Joachim Hannemann; Herbert Schmidt	Wilhelm Mahlow	Germany	6:08.5	R
3	Leonardo Bujas; Rade Sunara; Vice Jurišić; Marjan Zaninović; Ante Krnčević; Špiro Grubišić; Stipe Krnčević; Ćiril Ban	Pavao Ljubičić	Yugoslavia	6:15.5	R
4	Remond Larsen; Olaf Klitgaard Poulsen; Poul Byrge Poulsen; Keld Karise; Bjørner Drøger; Carl Berner; Knud Olsen; Emil Boje Jensen	Harry Gregersen	Denmark	6:18.0	R

=== Repechage ===
13 August. The winner of each race advanced to the final; the other boats were eliminated.

==== Repechage heat 1 ====
Rank	Rowers	Coxswain	Nation	Time	Notes
1	Alfred Rieck; Helmut Radach; Hans Kuschke; Heinz Kaufmann; Gerd Völs; Werner Loeckle; Hans-Joachim Hannemann; Herbert Schmidt	Wilhelm Mahlow	Germany	6:44.9	Q
2	Len Einsaar; Joe Gould; Mervyn Wood; Walter Jordan; George Elias; Wal Mackney; William Cross; Don Ferguson	Norman Ella	Australia	6:55.1	
3	Karel Brandstätter; Pavel Parák; Jan Holobrádek; Ladislav Smolík; František Kšír; František Kobzík; Rudolf Baránek; Antonín Hrstka	Bedřich Procházka	Czechoslovakia	7:07.8	
—	Remond Larsen; Olaf Klitgaard Poulsen; Poul Byrge Poulsen; Keld Karise; Bjørner Drøger; Carl Berner; Knud Olsen; Emil Boje Jensen	Harry Gregersen	Denmark	DNS	

==== Repechage heat 2 ====
Rank	Rowers	Coxswain	Nation	Time	Notes
1	Guglielmo Del Bimbo; Dino Barsotti; Oreste Grossi; Enzo Bartolini; Mario Checcacci; Dante Secchi; Ottorino Quaglierini; Enrico Garzelli	Cesare Milani	Italy	6:35.6	Q
2	Tadashi Negishi; Masaru Kashiwahara; Shusui Sekigawa; Isamu Mita; Osamu Kitamura; Haruyoshi Nakagawa; Takeo Hori; Yoshiteru Suzuki	Tadashi Shimijima	Japan	6:42.3	
3	Leonardo Bujas; Rade Sunara; Vice Jurišić; Marjan Zaninović; Ante Krnčević; Špiro Grubišić; Stipe Krnčević; Ćiril Ban	Pavao Ljubičić	Yugoslavia	6:47.3	
4	Arno Franzen; Maximo Fava; Ernesto Sauter; Alfredo de Baer; Frederico Tadewald; Henrique Kranen; Nilo Franzen; Lauro Franzen	Rodolpho Rath	Brazil	7:06.1	

==== Repechage heat 3 ====
14 August.

Rank	Rowers	Coxswain	Nation	Time	Notes
1	Tom Askwith; Ran Laurie; John Cherry; Hugh Mason; McAllister Lonnon; Annesley Kingsford; Desmond Kingsford; John Couchman	Noel Duckworth	Great Britain	6:29.3	Q
2	Cedric Liddell; Grey McLeish; Joseph Harris; Ben Sharpe; Jack Cunningham; Charles Matteson; Harry Fry; Sandy Saunders	Les MacDonald	Canada	6:33.8	
3	Émile Lecuirot; Louis Devillié; Henri Souharce; Alphonse Bouton; Camille Becanne; Bernard Batillat; Jean Cottez; Marcel Charletoux	Claude Lowenstein	France	6:36.6	

=== Final ===
Rank	Rowers	Coxswain	Nation	Time
1st place, gold medalist(s)	Herbert Morris; Charles Day; Gordon Adam; John White; James McMillin; George Hunt; Joe Rantz; Donald Hume	Robert Moch	United States	6:25.4
2nd place, silver medalist(s)	Guglielmo Del Bimbo; Dino Barsotti; Oreste Grossi; Enzo Bartolini; Mario Checcacci; Dante Secchi; Ottorino Quaglierini; Enrico Garzelli	Cesare Milani	Italy	6:26.0
3rd place, bronze medalist(s)	Alfred Rieck; Helmut Radach; Hans Kuschke; Heinz Kaufmann; Gerd Völs; Werner Loeckle; Hans-Joachim Hannemann; Herbert Schmidt	Wilhelm Mahlow	Germany	6:26.4
4	Tom Askwith; Ran Laurie; John Cherry; Hugh Mason; McAllister Lonnon; Annesley Kingsford; Desmond Kingsford; John Couchman	Noel Duckworth	Great Britain	6:30.1
5	Pál Domonkos; Sándor von Korompay; Hugó Ballya; Imre Kapossy; Antal Szendey; Gábor Alapy; Frigyes Hollósi; László Szabó	Ervin Kereszthy	Hungary	6:30.3
6	Werner Schweizer; Fritz Feldmann; Rudolf Homberger; Oskar Neuenschwander; Hermann Betschart; Hans Homberger; Alex Homberger; Karl Schmid	Rolf Spring	Switzerland	6:35.8
