= 1938 European Rowing Championships =

- Venue: Idroscalo
- Location: Milan, Italy
- Dates: September

The 1938 European Rowing Championships were rowing championships for men held in the Italian city of Milan. The venue was the Idroscalo, an artificial lake that had been opened as a seaplane airport in 1930. The rowers competed in all seven Olympic boat classes (M1x, M2x, M2-, M2+, M4-, M4+, M8+).

== Medal summary ==
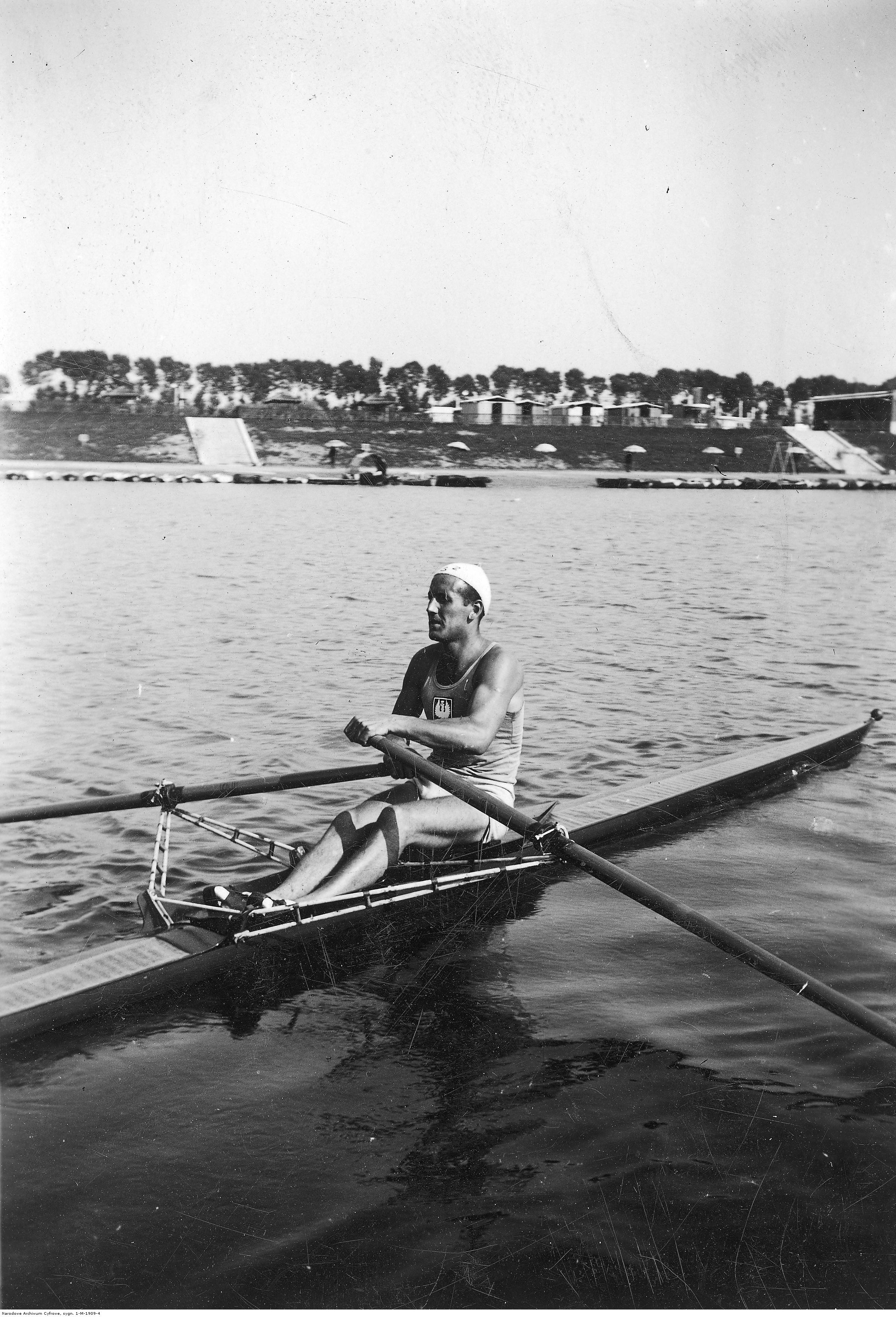
Roger Verey from Poland won silver

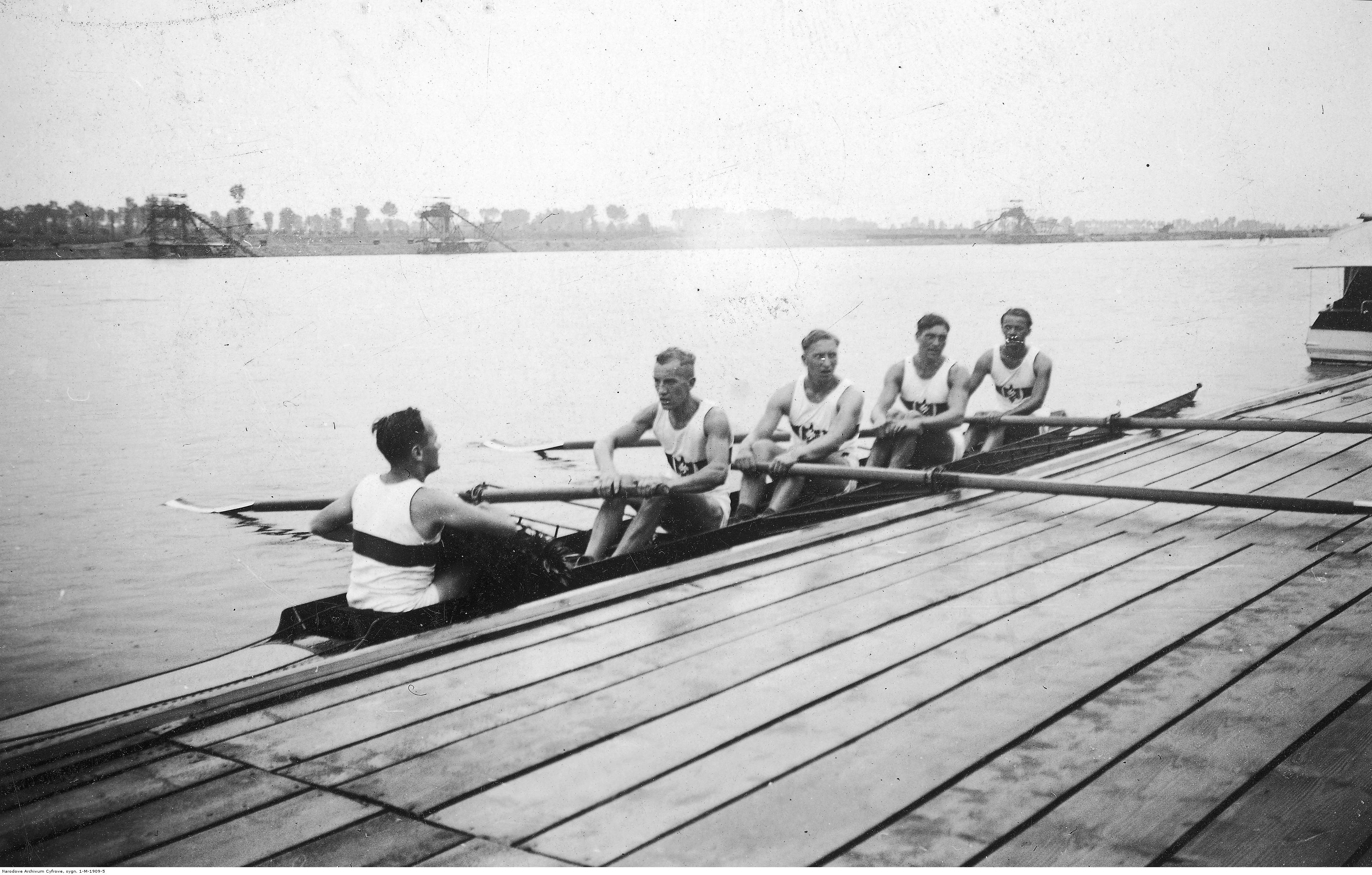
The German coxed four won gold

Event	Gold		Silver		Bronze	
Event	Country & rowers	Time	Country & rowers	Time	Country & rowers	Time
M1x	Austria; Josef Hasenöhrl		Poland; Roger Verey		Switzerland; Ernst Rufli	
M2x	Italy; Ettore Broschi; Giorgio Scherli		Nazi Germany; Eduard Paul; Ludwig Marquardt		Belgium; Henri Anderssen; Ben Piessens	
M2-	Nazi Germany; Heinrich Stelzer; Rudolf Eckstein		Italy; Mario Lazzati; Ermenegildo Manfredini		Denmark; Richard Olsen; Viggo Olsen	
M2+	Italy; Almiro Bergamo; Guido Santin; Guido Bettini (cox)		Nazi Germany; Herbert Adamski; Gerhard Gustmann; Günther Holstein (cox)		Denmark; Knud Kolman; Hugo Grumme; Frode Christiansen (cox)	
M4-	Switzerland; Hermann Betschart; Oskar Neuenschwander; Werner Schweizer; Karl Schmid		Italy; Francesco Pittaluga; Luigi Luxardo; Gaetano Petrucci; Agostino Massa		Denmark; Kaj Traulsen; Orla Teglers; Ole Secher; Leif Staunholt-Nielsen	
M4+	Nazi Germany; Paul Jung; Walter Gotthardt; Heinz Lückenga; Ulrich Kleiner; Fritz Bauer (cox)		Italy; Angelo Isella; Mario Acchini; Guglielmo del Neri; Angelo Fioretti; Alessandro Bardelli (cox)		Hungary; Geza Bodor; Ferenc Dunai; Imre Ladanyi; Bela Nyilasi; Istvan Gallik (cox)	
M8+	Nazi Germany; Erich Buschmann; Herbert Buhtz; Walter Volle; Joachim Charlé; Fritz Braunsdorf; Hans-Joachim Hannemann; Walter Fuglsang; Eberhard Kösling; Karl-Heinz Neumann (cox)		Hungary; Miklós Luczay; Dezső Szabados; Imre Kapossy; Ernö Bartók; Gábor Alapy; Antal Szendey; László Szabó; Hugó Ballya; Ervin Kereszthy (cox)		Italy; Alberto Bonciani; Ottorino Quaglierini; Oreste Grossi; Dante Secchi; Enzo Bartolini; Giovanni Persico; Dino Cecchi; Enrico Garzelli; Cesare Milani (cox)	
