= Ottorino Quaglierini =

Italian rower (1915–1992)

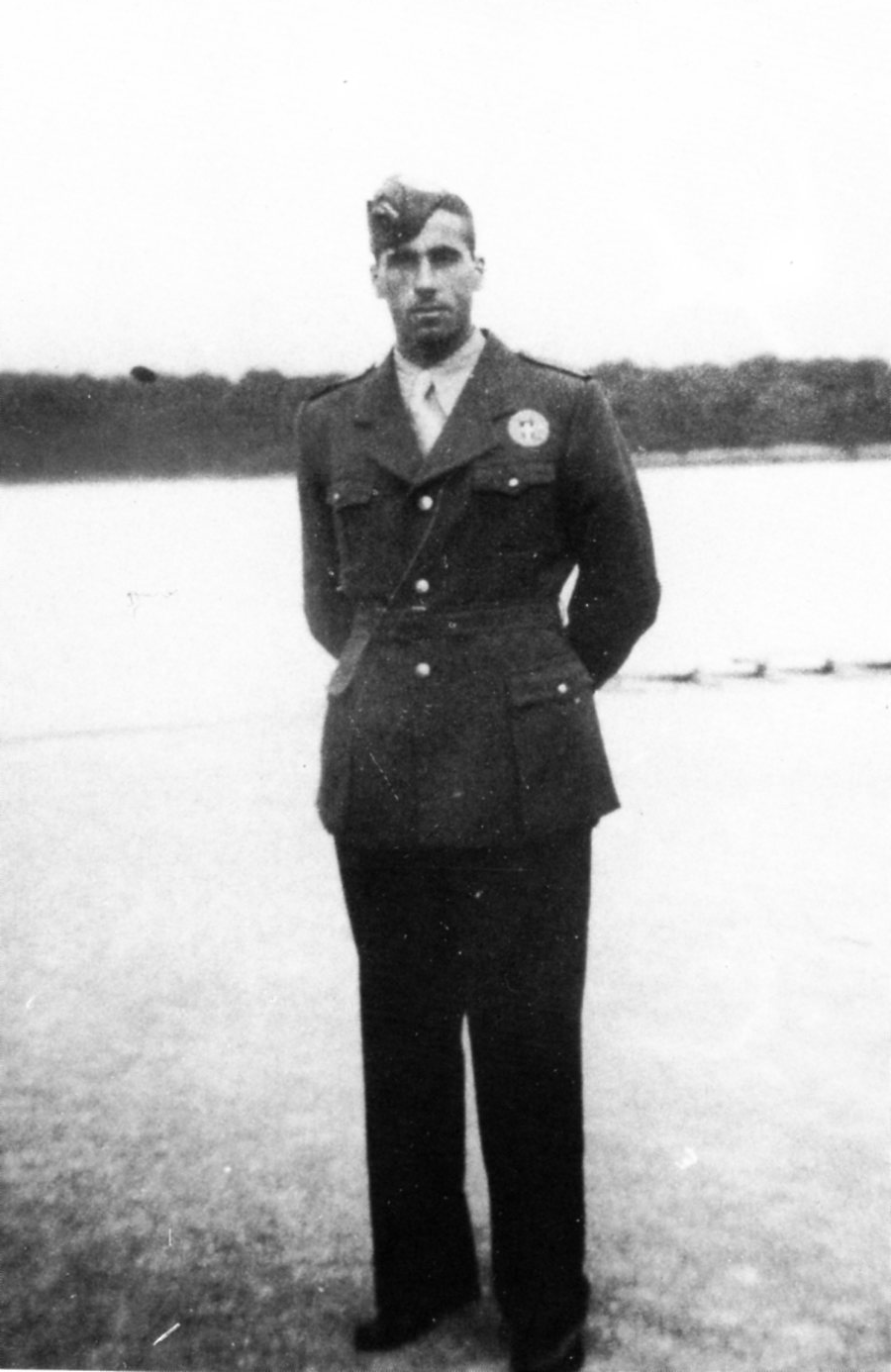
- Ottorino Quaglierini member of the Italian men's eight crew pictured in Olympics uniform

Personal information
- Nationality: Italian
- Born: 18 May 1915 Livorno, Italy
- Died: 26 July 1992 Livorno, Italy

Sport
- Club: Unione Canottieri Livornesi
Medal record
Men's rowing
Representing Italy
Olympic Games
Silver medal – second place	1936 Berlin	Eight
European Rowing Championships
Gold medal – first place	1937 Amsterdam	Eight
Bronze medal – third place	1938 Milan	Eight
Italian Rowing Championships
Gold medal – first place	1937 Pallanza	Eight
Gold medal – first place	1938 Como	Eight
Gold medal – first place	1939 Verbania	Eight
Gold medal – first place	1940 Verbania	Eight
Silver medal – second place	1942 Padua	Eight

Ottorino Quaglierini (18 May 1915 – 26 July 1992), born in Livorno, was an Italian rower who competed in the 1936 Summer Olympics.

On 15 August 1936 he won the silver medal as crew member of the Italian boat (Guglielmo Del Bimbo, Dino Barsotti, Oreste Grossi, Enzo Bartolini, Mario Checcacci, Dante Secchi, Enrico Garzelli; helmsman Cesare Milani) in the eight event. With the same crew he won the gold medal in 1937 at the European championships in Amsterdam, and the bronze medal in Milan the following year.

Ottorino Quaglierini was member of Unione Canottieri Livornesi, nicknamed scarronzoni derived from their ungraceful manner of rowing.

== See also ==
- Italy at the 1936 Summer Olympics
- Rowing at the 1936 Summer Olympics
