= 1937 European Rowing Championships =

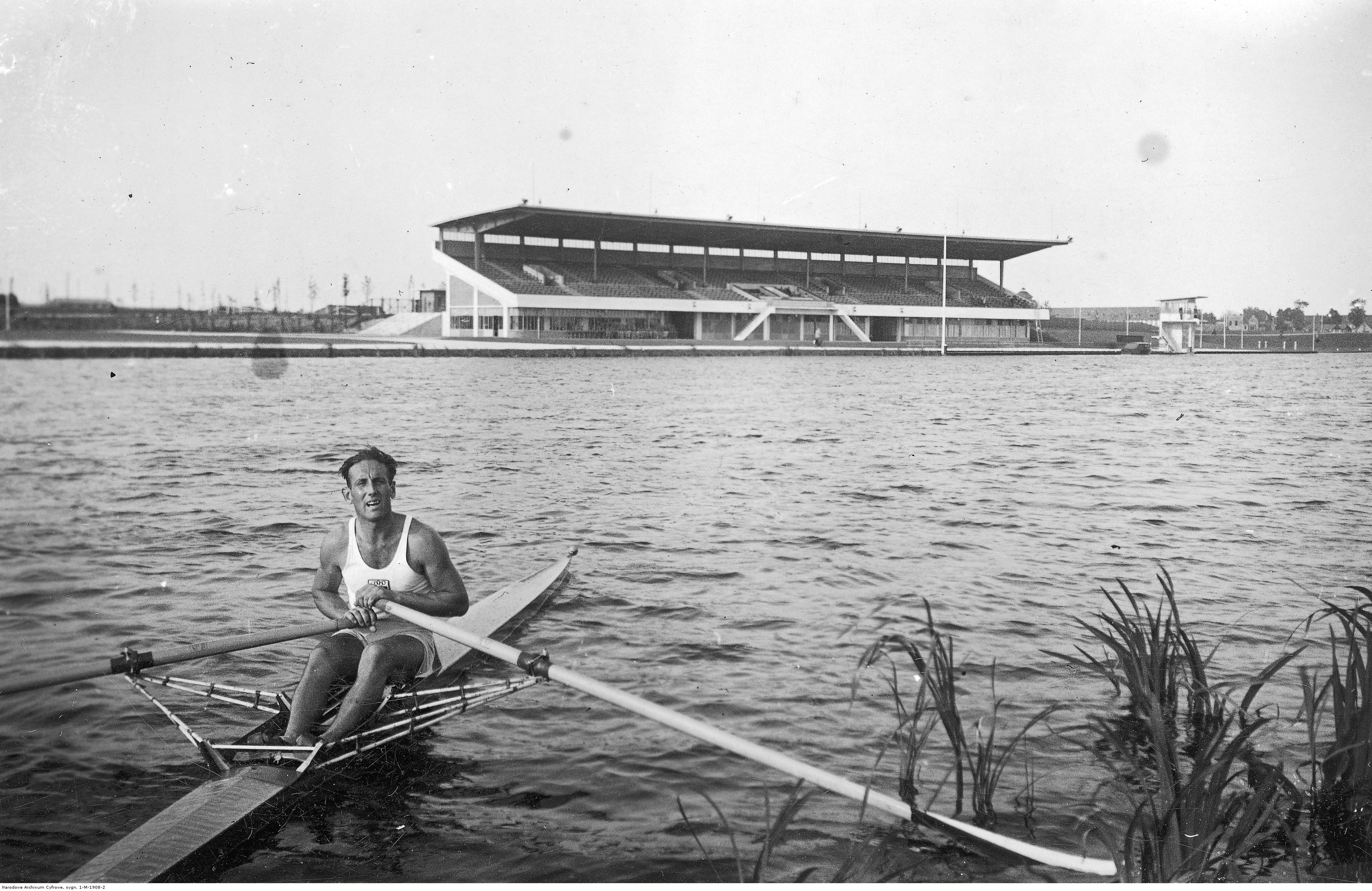
- Roger Verey from Poland at the Bosbaan
- Venue: Bosbaan
- Location: Amsterdam, the Netherlands
- Dates: August

The 1937 European Rowing Championships were rowing championships for men held on the Bosbaan in the Dutch city of Amsterdam. The construction of the Bosbaan was an unemployment project, with the forest planted from 1934 onwards and the rowing lake finished in 1936. The rowers competed in all seven Olympic boat classes (M1x, M2x, M2-, M2+, M4-, M4+, M8+).

== Medal summary ==
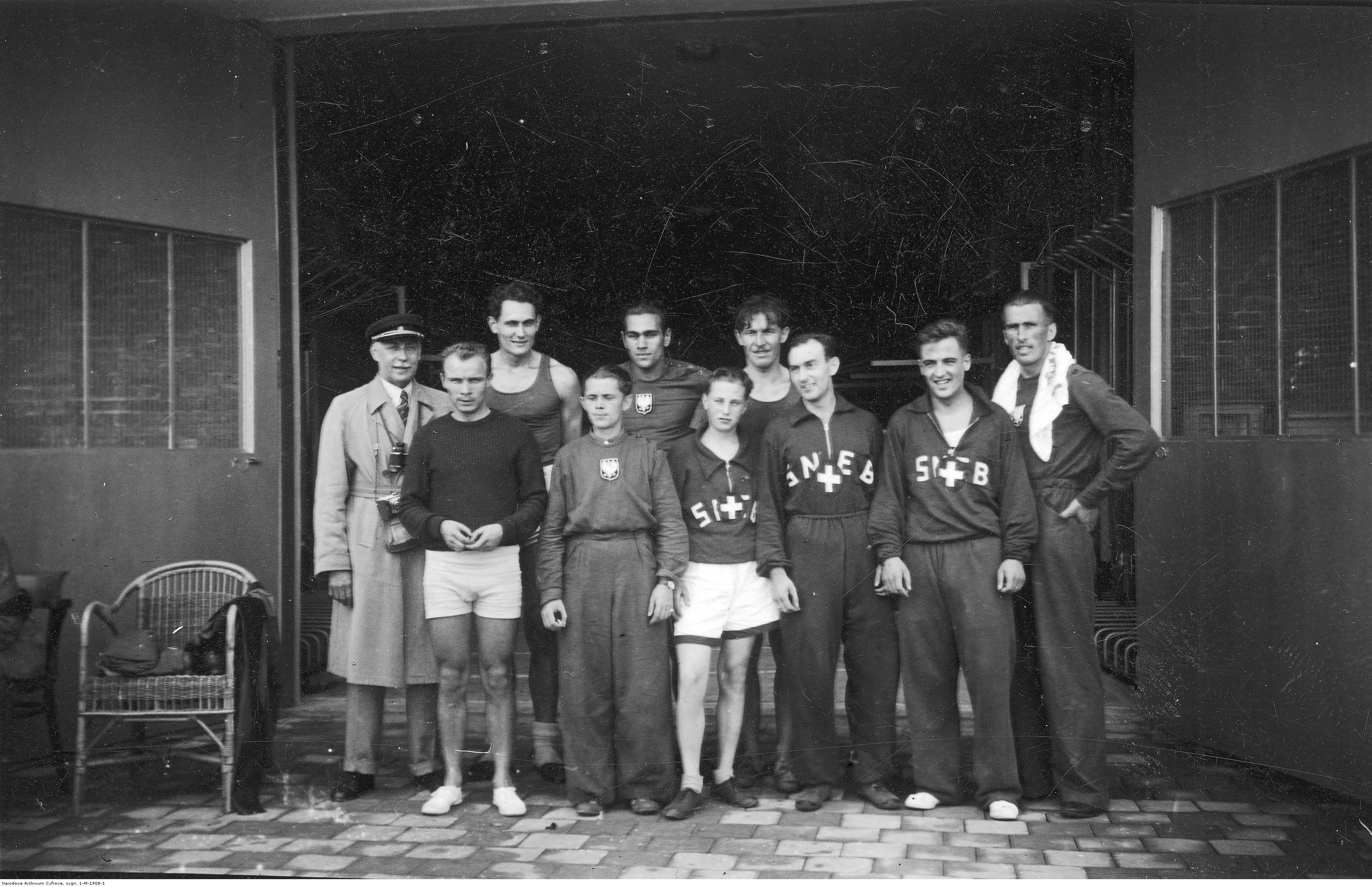
Members of the Polish and Swiss teams

In the coxless four, the Swiss team looked like the certain winners. At 1,900, with one and a half lengths of lead, the boat was hit by a wave that had been reflected from the bulkhead, Hermann Betschart had his oar ripped out of his hands but not before the rowlock bent and the hull was ripped open. The Swiss came second to a standing ovation, having been overtaken by the German boat.

Event	Gold		Silver		Bronze	
Event	Country & rowers	Time	Country & rowers	Time	Country & rowers	Time
M1x	Switzerland; Eugen Studach		Austria; Josef Hasenöhrl		Poland; Roger Verey	
M2x	Nazi Germany; Joachim Pirsch; Willi Kaidel		Hungary; Karoly Szandtner; Egon Szandtner		Italy; Ettore Broschi; Giorgio Scherli	
M2-	Italy; Mario Lazzati; Ermenegildo Manfredini		Denmark; Richard Olsen; Harry Larsen		Switzerland; Karl Müller; Wilhelm Klopfer	
M2+	Nazi Germany; Herbert Adamski; Gerhard Gustmann; Günther Holstein (cox)		Italy; Almiro Bergamo; Guido Santin; Guido Bettini (cox)		Poland; Stanisław Kuryłłowicz; Lech Manitius; Mieczysław Bącler (cox)	
M4-	Nazi Germany; Ernst-August Grosskopf; Karl Seuser; Georg Schmid; Werner Immand		Switzerland; Hermann Betschart; Oskar Neuenschwander; Werner Schweizer; Karl Schmid		Hungary; Hugó Ballya; Antal Szendey; Frigyes Hollósi; László Szabó	
M4+	Nazi Germany; Walter Kaps; Erich Knorr; Heinz Kaufmann; Wilhelm Ewerth; Wilhelm Mahlow (cox)		Netherlands; Simon de Wit; J. A. W. C. Smit; Hotse Bartlema; Mak Schoorl; Gerard Hallie (cox)		Italy; Aldo Pellizzoni; Lucillo Bobig; Guglielmo del Neri; Milan Busani; Eugenio Suzzi (cox)	
M8+	Italy; Alberto Bonciani; Ottorino Quaglierini; Enzo Bartolini; Dante Secchi; Mario Checcacci; Giovanni Persico; Oreste Grossi; Enrico Garzelli; Cesare Milani (cox)		Nazi Germany; Erich Buschmann; Herbert Buhtz; Walter Volle; Joachim Charlé; Fritz Braunsdorf; Georg Jakstat; Walter Fuglsang; Eberhard Kösling; Karl-Heinz Neumann (cox)		Denmark; Flemming Jensen; Hans Nielsen; Poul Byrge Poulsen; Carl Berner; Bjørner Drøger; Kaj Söderberg; Remond Larsen; Emil Boje Jensen; Aage Jensen (cox)	
