= Krnčević =

Krnčević is a Croatian surname. Notable people with the surname include:

- Ante Krnčević (1909–1993), Croatian rower
- Daniel Krnćević (1929–1983), Croatian rower
- Eddie Krncevic (born 1960), Australian-born footballer and manager
