= Bernard Batillat =

French rower (1908–1997)

Bernard Paulin Batillat
Personal information
- Born: 24 January 1908 Coullons, Centre-Val de Loire, France
- Died: 4 September 1997 (aged 89)

Sport
- Sport: Rowing
Medal record
Men's rowing
Representing France
European Rowing Championships
Silver medal – second place	1934 Lucerne	Coxed pair
Bronze medal – third place	1935 Berlin	Eight

Bernard Paulin Batillat (24 January 1908 – 4 September 1997) was a French rower.

Batillat was born in 1908 in Coullons. He competed at the 1936 Summer Olympics in Berlin with the men's eight where they were eliminated in the semi-final. He died on 4 September 1997.
