= Byrge =

Byrge is a surname of Danish origin. Notable people with the surname include:

- Bill Byrge (1938–2025), American actor and comedian
- Poul Byrge Poulsen (1915–1994), Danish rower
- Signe Byrge Sørensen (born 1970), Danish film producer
