= Haruyoshi =

- Gender: Male

Origin
- Origin: Japanese
- Meaning: Different meanings depending on the kanji used

Haruyoshi (はるよし) is a masculine Japanese given name.

== Written forms ==
- 治好
- 晴良
- 春義

== People with the name ==
- Matsudaira Haruyoshi (松平 治好; 1768–1826), Japanese daimyō
- Haruyoshi Nagae (1893–1961), Japanese painter
- Haruyoshi Nakagawa, Japanese rower
- Nijō Haruyoshi (二条 晴良; 1526–1579), Japanese kugyō
- Haruyoshi Ōkawa (大川 春義; 1909–1985), Japanese matagi
