= Olaf Poulsen =

Olaf Poulsen may refer to:

- Olaf Poulsen (actor), Danish actor
- Olaf Poulsen (Norway), Norwegian sports official
- Olaf Klitgaard Poulsen, Danish rower
