= Zaninović =

Zaninović is a Croatian surname. Notable people with the surname include:

- Ana Zaninović (born 1987), Croatian taekwondo practitioner
- Lucija Zaninović (born 1987), Croatian taekwondo practitioner
- Marjan Zaninović (1911–1968), Croatian rower
