= Claude Saunders =

Canadian rower

Medal record

Men's rowing

Representing Canada

Claude "Sandy" Saunders (January 25, 1912 – April 30, 2007) was a Canadian rower who competed in the Olympic Games in 1936 in Berlin. He competed in the 1936 Summer Olympics in Men's eight, but did not win a medal. He was also a spare at the 1948 Summer Olympics and coached Canada's rowing team at the 1958 British Empire and Commonwealth Games and the 1960 Summer Olympics. He was Canada's FISU representative at the 1964 and 1968 Summer Olympics. He was also president of the Central Ontario Rowing Association, the Canadian Secondary School Rowing Association and the Canadian Amateur Association of Oarsmen. Saunders was the first Canadian to hold a referee's license from the International Rowing Federation. Saunders was born in Hamilton, Ontario. At the time of his death, he was Canada's second-oldest living Olympic competitor, behind Betty Tancock.
