= Henri Souharce =

French rower (1909–1974)

Personal information
- Born: 31 March 1909
- Died: 3 July 1974 (aged 65)

Sport
- Sport: Rowing
Medal record
Men's rowing
Representing France
European Rowing Championships
Bronze medal – third place	1935 Berlin	Eight

Henri Souharce (31 March 1909 – 3 July 1974) was a French rower. He competed at the 1936 Summer Olympics in Amsterdam with the men's eight where they were eliminated in the semi-final.
