= Leonardo Bujas =

Croatian rower (1906–1981)

Personal information
- Nationality: Croatian
- Born: 18 November 1904; Šibenik, Austria-Hungary
- Died: 4 May 1981 (aged 76); Šibenik, Yugoslavia

Sport
- Sport: Rowing

Leonardo Bujas (18 November 1904 – 4 May 1981) was a Croatian rower. He competed in the men's eight event at the 1936 Summer Olympics.
