= Shusui Sekigawa =

Japanese rower (born 1913)

Personal information
- Nationality: Japanese
- Born: 13 May 1913

Sport
- Sport: Rowing

Shusui Sekigawa (born 13 May 1913, date of death unknown) was a Japanese rower. He competed in the men's eight event at the 1936 Summer Olympics.
