= Pavel Parák =

Czech rower

Personal information
- Nationality: Czech
- Born: 16 July 1913
- Died: 30 September 1996 (aged 83)

Sport
- Sport: Rowing

Pavel Parák (16 July 1913 – 30 September 1996) was a Czech rower. He competed in the men's eight event at the 1936 Summer Olympics.
