= František Kšír =

Czech rower

Personal information
- Nationality: Czech
- Born: 22 January 1914 Brno, Moravia, Austria-Hungary
- Died: 5 September 1943 (aged 29) Ludwigsburg, Nazi Germany

Sport
- Sport: Rowing

František Kšír (22 January 1914 – 5 September 1943) was a Czech rower. He competed in the men's eight event at the 1936 Summer Olympics.
