= Karel Brandstätter =

Czech rower

Personal information
- Nationality: Czech
- Born: 5 February 1915

Sport
- Sport: Rowing

Karel Brandstätter (born 5 February 1915, date of death unknown) was a Czech rower. He competed in the men's eight event at the 1936 Summer Olympics.
