= Alfredo de Boer =

Brazilian rower (1907–1987)

Alfredo de Bôer
Personal information
- Born: 16 May 1907; Rio Grande, Brazil
- Died: 3 July 1987 (aged 80); Porto Alegre, Brazil

Sport
- Sport: Rowing

Alfredo de Bôer (16 May 1907 – 3 July 1987) was a Brazilian rower. He competed in the men's eight event at the 1936 Summer Olympics.
