= Werner Loeckle =

German rower (1916–1996)

Personal information
- Born: Werner Ernst Loeckle; 4 May 1916
- Died: 20 March 1996 (aged 79)

Sport
- Sport: Rowing
- Club: RG Wiking Berlin 1896
Medal record
Men's rowing
Representing Nazi Germany
Olympic Games
Bronze medal – third place	1936 Berlin	Eight

Werner Ernst Loeckle (4 May 1916 – 20 March 1996) was a German rower who competed in the 1936 Summer Olympics.

In 1936 he won the bronze medal as crew member of the German boat in the men's eight competition.

He was later a gynaecologist in Frankfurt.
