= Charles Day (rower) =

American rower (1914–1962)

Medal record

Men's rowing

Representing the United States

Olympic Games
Gold medal – first place	1936 Berlin	Men's eight

Charles Ward Day (October 19, 1914 – May 26, 1962) was an American rower who won Olympic gold at the 1936 Summer Olympics.

The son of a dentist, Day was born in Colville, Washington into an Irish American family.

Day rowed in the University of Washington senior varsity eights which won US national Intercollegiate Rowing Association titles in 1936 and 1937. In 1936, he won the Olympic gold medal rowing in the two seat of the American boat in the eights competition. His role in the University of Washington eight and their Olympic victory is explored in the 2013 non-fiction book by author Daniel James Brown, The Boys in the Boat.

A medical graduate, Day served as Naval doctor in the South Pacific theatre of WWII. Post-war he practised as a gynaecologist. He died of lung cancer due to years of heavy smoking at age 47.
