= Ernesto Sauter =

Brazilian rower

Personal information
- Born: 10 July 1905; Jaguari, Brazil
- Died: 6 April 1984 (aged 78)

Sport
- Sport: Rowing

Ernesto Sauter (10 July 1905 – 6 April 1984) was a Brazilian rower. He competed in the men's eight event at the 1936 Summer Olympics.
