= Camille Becanne =

French rower

Personal information
- Nationality: French
- Born: 7 August 1913; Toulouse, France
- Died: June 2, 1979 (aged 65); Toulouse, France

Sport
- Sport: Rowing

Camille Becanne (7 August 1913 – 2 June 1979) was a French rower. He competed in the men's eight event at the 1936 Summer Olympics.
