= Hans Homberger =

Swiss rower

Personal information
- Born: Hans Ernst Homberger; 31 October 1908 Schaffhausen
- Died: 26 January 1986 (aged 77)

Sport
- Sport: Rowing
Medal record
Men's rowing
Representing Switzerland
Olympic Games
Silver medal – second place	1936 Berlin	Coxed four
Bronze medal – third place	1936 Berlin	Coxless four
European Rowing Championships
Gold medal – first place	1935 Berlin	Coxless four
Silver medal – second place	1935 Berlin	Eight

Hans Ernst Homberger (31 October 1908 - 26 January 1986) was a Swiss rower who competed with two of his brothers. He won two medals at the 1935 European Rowing Championships and a further two medals at the 1936 Summer Olympics. Born into a family of industrialists, he took over the International Watch Company when his father died in 1955. He led the company until he sold it to VDO in 1978.

== Family ==
Homberger was born in 1908 in Schaffhausen, Switzerland. Two of his younger brothers, Rudolf Homberger (born 1910) and Alex Homberger (born 1912), were also competitive rowers. Their father was Ernst Homberger who headed the Georg Fischer company since 1902, and who later became the head of the International Watch Company.

== Rowing career ==
At the 1935 European Rowing Championships in Berlin, Homberger won gold with the coxless four; his brother Alexander was part of the crew. At the same event, all three brothers competed with the men's eight and came second.

In 1936 he was a crew member of the Swiss boat which won the silver medal in the coxed four event. As part of the Swiss boat in the coxless four competition he won the bronze medal. He also participated in the eight event where the Swiss boat finished sixth. Whilst the Swiss had been the favourites for the men's eight event, four of them had already competed in the coxed four and coxless four events that day (including both Hans and Alex Homberger) and they were exhausted when the final for the eight was raced.

== Professional career ==
When his father died in 1955, Homberger took over as managing director of the International Watch Company. He led the company until 1978 when it was sold to VDO.

Homberger died in 1986.
