= László Szabó (rower) =

Hungarian rower

Personal information
- Born: 2 January 1908 Süttő, Hungary
- Died: 6 December 1992 (aged 84) Melbourne, Australia

Sport
- Sport: Rowing
- Club: Pannónia Evezős Egylet
Medal record
Men's rowing
Representing Hungary
European Rowing Championships
Bronze medal – third place	1931 Paris	Eight
Gold medal – first place	1932 Belgrade	Coxless four
Gold medal – first place	1933 Budapest	Eight
Gold medal – first place	1935 Berlin	Eight
Bronze medal – third place	1937 Amsterdam	Coxless four
Silver medal – second place	1938 Milan	Eight

László Szabó (2 January 1908 – 6 December 1992) was a Hungarian rower. He competed at the 1936 Summer Olympics in Berlin with the men's eight where they came fifth.
