= Robert Moch =

American rower (1914–2005)

Medal record

Men's rowing

Representing the United States

Olympic Games
Gold medal – first place	1936 Berlin	Eight

Robert Gaston Moch (June 20, 1914 – January 18, 2005) was an American coxswain who won Olympic gold at the 1936 Summer Olympics.

Moch was born and raised in Montesano, Washington. He was the class valedictorian at Montesano High in 1932. His father, Gaston Moch, was a Jewish immigrant watchmaker and jeweler from Switzerland.

He coxed the University of Washington senior varsity eight which won US national Intercollegiate Rowing Association titles in 1936. At the 1936 Olympics, he won the gold medal as coxswain of the American boat in the eights competition. His role as a coxswain for the University of Washington and Olympic crew is explored in the 2013 non-fiction book by author Daniel James Brown, The Boys in the Boat.

After college, Moch signed on as assistant crew coach at the University of Washington, under his old coach. Moch later went on to become the head crew coach at Massachusetts Institute of Technology (MIT), and earned his law degree from Harvard Law School. Moch became a successful lawyer in Seattle and won a case in front of the U.S. Supreme Court.
