= Louis Devillié =

French rower

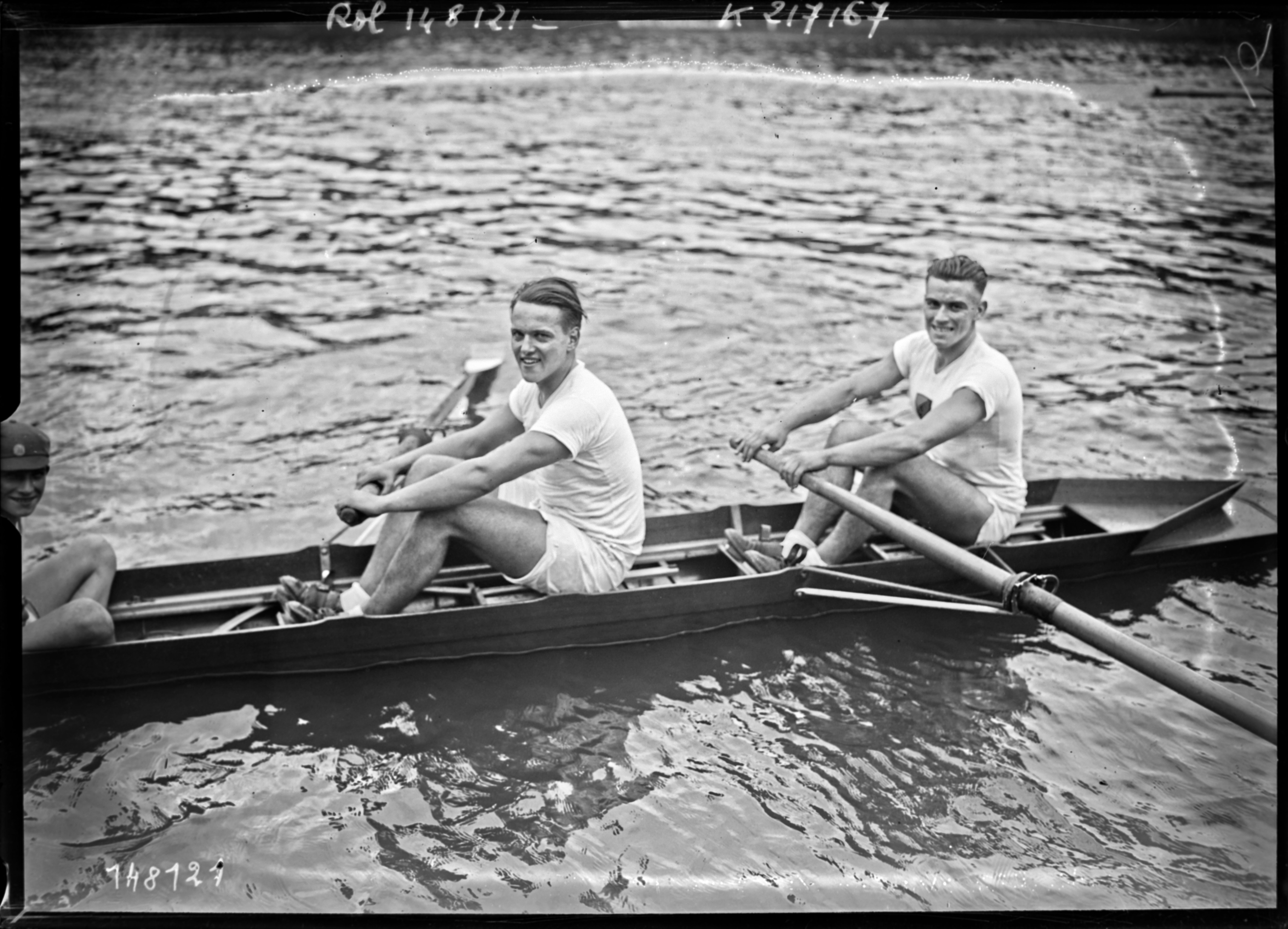
- Devillié (right) with Jean Cottez

Personal information
- Born: 29 May 1905 Paris, France
- Died: 14 December 1976 (aged 71) Créteil, France

Sport
- Sport: Rowing
Medal record
Men's rowing
Representing France
European Rowing Championships
Gold medal – first place	1931 Paris	Eight
Bronze medal – third place	1934 Lucerne	Coxless four

Louis Marie Devillié (29 May 1905 – 14 December 1976) was a French rower. He competed at the 1928 Summer Olympics in Amsterdam with the men's coxless four where they were eliminated in the round one repechage.
