= Gábor Alapy =

Hungarian rower (1912–1999)

Personal information
- Born: 15 April 1912 Budapest, Hungary
- Died: 11 April 1999 (aged 86) Innsbruck, Austria

Sport
- Sport: Rowing
Medal record
Men's rowing
Representing Hungary
European Rowing Championships
| Gold medal – first place | 1933 Budapest | Eight |
| Gold medal – first place | 1935 Berlin | Eight |
| Silver medal – second place | 1938 Milan | Eight |

Gábor Alapy (15 April 1912 – 11 April 1999) was a Hungarian rower. He competed at the 1936 Summer Olympics in Berlin with the men's eight where they came fifth.
