= Hugó Ballya =

Hungarian rower (1908–1995)

Personal information
- Born: 20 July 1908 Kassa, Austria-Hungary
- Died: 8 January 1995 (aged 86) Budapest, Hungary

Sport
- Sport: Rowing
Medal record
Men's rowing
Representing Hungary
European Rowing Championships
Bronze medal – third place	1931 Paris	Eight
Gold medal – first place	1933 Budapest	Eight
Silver medal – second place	1933 Budapest	Coxed four
Gold medal – first place	1935 Berlin	Eight
Bronze medal – third place	1937 Amsterdam	Coxless four
Silver medal – second place	1938 Milan	Eight

Hugó Ballya (20 July 1908 – 8 January 1995) was a Hungarian rower. He competed at the 1936 Summer Olympics in Berlin with the men's eight where they came fifth.
