= Hans Kuschke =

German rower

Personal information
- Born: 25 February 1914
- Died: 30 November 2003 (aged 89)

Sport
- Sport: Rowing
- Club: RG Wiking Berlin 1896
Medal record
Men's rowing
Representing Nazi Germany
Olympic Games
Bronze medal – third place	1936 Berlin	Eight

Hans Kuschke (25 February 1914 – 30 November 2003) was a German rower who competed in the 1936 Summer Olympics.

In 1936 he won the bronze medal as crew member of the German boat in the men's eight competition.
