= Alfred Rieck =

German rower

Personal information
- Born: 5 August 1914
- Died: 14 August 2000 (aged 86)

Sport
- Sport: Rowing
- Club: RG Wiking Berlin 1896
Medal record
Men's rowing
Representing Nazi Germany
Olympic Games
Bronze medal – third place	1936 Berlin	Eight

Alfred Rieck (5 August 1914 – 14 August 2000) was a German rower who competed in the 1936 Summer Olympics, winning the bronze medal as a crew member of the German boat in the men's eight competition.
