= Tadashi Negishi =

Japanese rower (1912–1985)

Personal information
- Nationality: Japanese
- Born: 22 August 1912; Tokyo, Japan
- Died: 16 December 1985 (aged 73)

Sport
- Sport: Rowing

Tadashi Negishi (22 August 1912 – 16 December 1985) was a Japanese rower. He competed in the men's eight event at the 1936 Summer Olympics.
