= Marcel Charletoux =

French rower

Personal information
- Nationality: French
- Born: 5 September 1913; Antoingt, France
- Died: 11 September 1978 (aged 65); Paris, France

Sport
- Sport: Rowing

Marcel Charletoux (5 September 1913 – 11 September 1978) was a French rower. He competed in the men's eight event at the 1936 Summer Olympics.
