= Herbert Schmidt =

Personal information
- Born: 28 January 1914 – 18 September
- Died: 18 September 2002 (aged 88)

Sport
- Sport: Rowing
Medal record
Men's rowing
Representing Germany
Olympic Games
Bronze medal – third place	1936 Berlin	Eight

Herbert Schmidt (28 January 1914 – 18 September 2002) was a German rower who competed in the 1936 Summer Olympics.

Schmidt was born in 1914. In 1936 he won the bronze medal as crew member of the German boat in the men's eight competition.

Immediately after the end of World War II, he was put in charge of sport for the administrative area of Köpenick. He is credited with reviving rowing as a sport in East Berlin. In 1948, he became chief editor of Deutsches Sportecho, an East German daily sports newspaper. He was dismissed from this role after only a few months and went to the radio station Sender Freies Berlin in West Berlin instead where he was in charge of the sports department.

Schmidt died in 2002.
