= Frigyes Hollósi (sportsman) =

Hungarian swimmer and rower

Personal information
- Born: 18 February 1906 Nagymaros, Austria-Hungary
- Died: 15 January 1979 (aged 72) Budapest, Hungary

Sport
- Sport: Rowing, swimming
Medal record
Men's rowing
Representing Hungary
European Rowing Championships
| Gold medal – first place | 1933 Budapest | Eight |
| Silver medal – second place | 1933 Budapest | Coxed four |
| Gold medal – first place | 1935 Berlin | Eight |
| Bronze medal – third place | 1937 Amsterdam | Coxless four |

Frigyes Hollósi (18 February 1906 – 15 January 1979), also known as Hollósi-Jung, was a Hungarian swimmer and rower. He competed in the men's 200 metre breaststroke event at the 1924 Summer Olympics. He also competed in the men's eight in rowing at the 1936 Summer Olympics.
