= Rudolf Baránek =

Czech rower

Personal information
- Nationality: Czech
- Born: 20 December 1909

Sport
- Sport: Rowing

Rudolf Baránek (born 20 December 1909, date of death unknown) was a Czech rower. He competed in the men's eight event at the 1936 Summer Olympics.
