= František Kobzík =

Czech rower

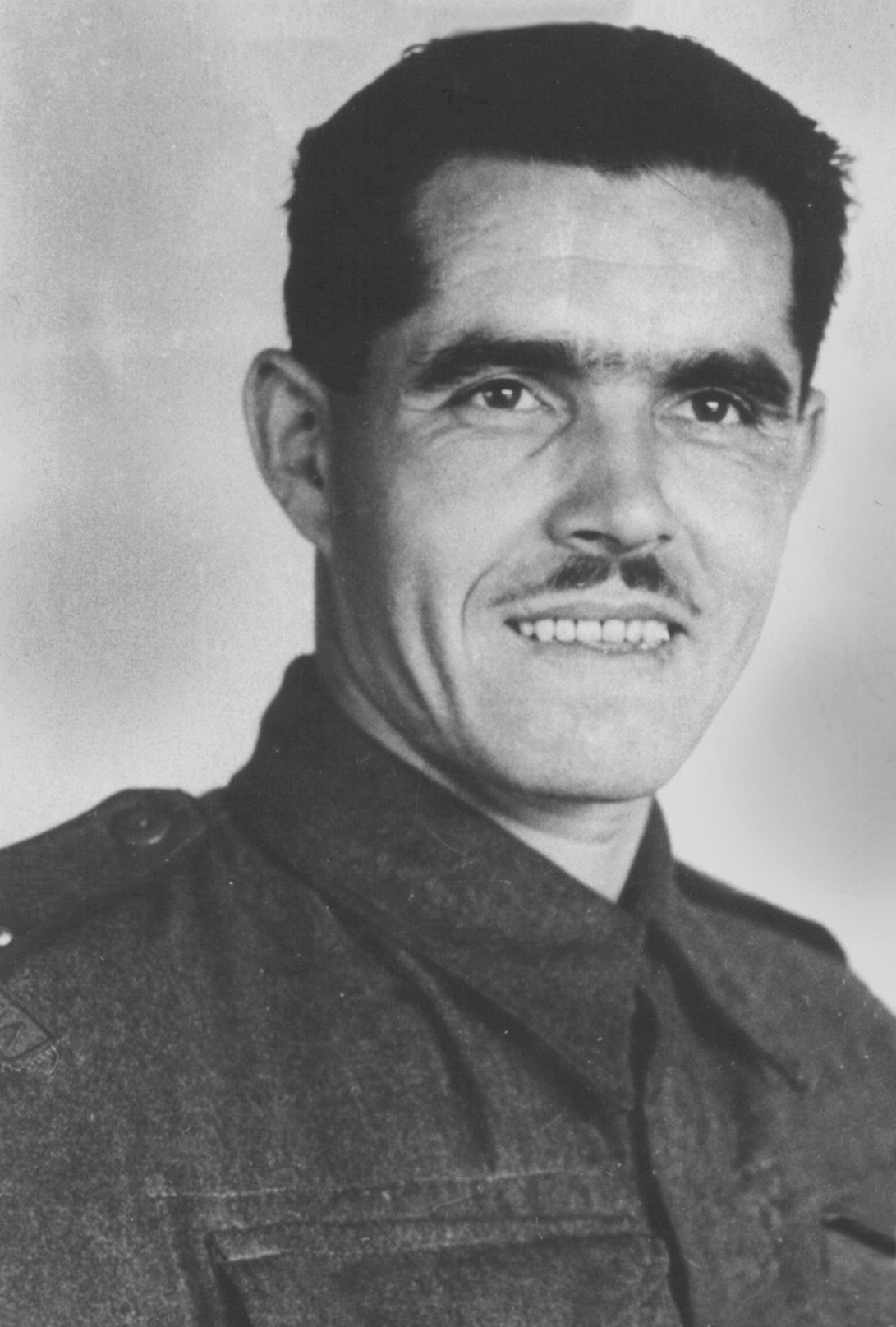

Personal information
- Nationality: Czech
- Born: 22 March 1914 Břeclav, Austria-Hungary
- Died: 7 May 1944 (aged 30) Rudice, Protectorate of Bohemia and Moravia

Sport
- Sport: Rowing

František Kobzík (22 March 1914 – 7 May 1944) was a Czech rower. He competed in the men's eight event at the 1936 Summer Olympics.

On the onset of the German occupation of Czechoslovakia, Kobzík left the country. He joined the French Foreign Legion and was trained in Sidi Bel Abbès. After the defeat of France to Nazi Germany, he was evacuated to England, where he joined the Czechoslovak Army in exile. In Scotland, Kobzík underwent a parachutist training. On the night of 12–13 April 1944, he parachuted near Vacenovice in Moravian Slovakia. Together with his companion, Kobzík managed to move to the village of Rudice. On 7 May, a local person notified Protectorate authorities about their presence. Being surrounded by the police, Kobzík with his companion committed suicide.
