= James McMillin =

American rower (1914–2005)

Medal record

Men's rowing

Representing the United States

Olympic Games
Gold medal – first place	1936 Berlin	Men's eight

James Burge McMillin (March 8, 1914 – August 22, 2005) was an American rower who won Olympic gold at the 1936 Summer Olympics.

McMillin was born in Seattle and raised in the Queen Anne Hill area.

McMillin rowed in the University of Washington senior varsity eights which won US national Intercollegiate Rowing Association titles in 1936 and 1937. In 1936, he rowed to an Olympic gold medal in the five seat of the American boat in the eights competition. His role in the University of Washington eight and their Olympic victory is explored in the 2013 non-fiction book by author Daniel James Brown, The Boys in the Boat.

After graduating McMillin coached rowing at Massachusetts Institute of Technology during World War II and worked at MIT as a laboratory engineer on classified research. His later career was with Boeing in Seattle.
