= Sándor von Korompay =

Hungarian rower

Personal information
- Born: 17 June 1912 Budapest, Hungary
- Died: 26 August 1986 (aged 74)

Sport
- Sport: Rowing
Medal record
Men's rowing
Representing Hungary
European Rowing Championships
Gold medal – first place	1935 Berlin	Eight

Sándor von Korompay (17 June 1912 – 26 August 1986) was a Hungarian rower. He competed at the 1936 Summer Olympics in Berlin with the men's eight where they came fifth.
