= John White (rower) =

American rower (1916–1997)

Medal record

Men's rowing

Representing the United States

Olympic Games
Gold medal – first place	1936 Berlin	Eight

John Galbraith White (May 16, 1916 – March 16, 1997) was an American rower who won Olympic gold at the 1936 Summer Olympics.

Born in Seattle and raised in the Seward Park area, White's father was a steel exporter who had sculled at the Pennsylvania Athletic Club in Philadelphia. John White was aged just 16 when he graduated from Franklin High School to the University of Washington.

White rowed in the University of Washington senior varsity eights which won US national Intercollegiate Rowing Association titles in 1936 and 1937. In 1936, he won the Olympic gold medal in the four seat of the American boat in the eights competition. His role in the University of Washington eight and their Olympic victory is explored in the 2013 non-fiction book by author Daniel James Brown, The Boys in the Boat.

White graduated with a degree in metallurgical engineering. His career was in the steel industry including a position as General Manager Sales at Bethlehem Steel.
