= Pál Domonkos =

Hungarian rower

Personal information
- Born: 9 February 1907 Budapest, Hungary
- Died: 21 May 1964 (aged 55)

Sport
- Sport: Rowing
Medal record
Men's rowing
Representing Hungary
European Rowing Championships
Bronze medal – third place	1931 Paris	Eight
Gold medal – first place	1935 Berlin	Eight

Pál Domonkos (9 February 1907 – 21 May 1964) was a Hungarian rower. He competed at the 1936 Summer Olympics in Berlin with the men's eight where they came fifth.
