= Hans-Joachim Hannemann =

German rower

Personal information
- Born: 5 April 1915
- Died: 6 March 1989 (aged 73)

Sport
- Sport: Rowing
- Club: Rudergesellschaft Wiking
Medal record
Men's rowing
Representing Nazi Germany
Olympic Games
Bronze medal – third place	1936 Berlin	Eight
European Rowing Championships
Gold medal – first place	1938 Milan	Eight

Hans-Joachim Hannemann (5 April 1915 – 6 March 1989) was a German rower who competed in the 1936 Summer Olympics.

In 1936 he won the bronze medal as a member of Germany's boat team in the men's eight competition.
