= Lauro Franzen =

Brazilian rower

Personal information
- Born: 6 May 1911; Garibaldi, Brazil
- Died: 1971 (aged 59–60); Rio Grande do Sul, Brazil

Sport
- Sport: Rowing

Lauro Franzen (6 May 1911 – 1971) was a Brazilian rower. He competed in the men's eight event at the 1936 Summer Olympics.
