= Tadashi Shimijima =

Japanese rower

Personal information
- Nationality: Japanese
- Born: 8 October 1912

Sport
- Sport: Rowing

Tadashi Shimijima (born 8 October 1912, date of death unknown) was a Japanese rower. He competed in the men's eight event at the 1936 Summer Olympics.
