= Helmut Radach =

German rower

Personal information
- Born: 1 February 1915 Berlin, Germany
- Died: 13 April 1999 (aged 84)

Sport
- Sport: Rowing
- Club: RG Wiking Berlin 1896
Medal record
Men's rowing
Representing Nazi Germany
Olympic Games
Bronze medal – third place	1936 Berlin	Eight

Helmut Radach (1 February 1915 – 13 April 1999) was a German rower who competed in the 1936 Summer Olympics. In 1936 he won the bronze medal as crew member of the German boat in the men's eight competition.
