= Jan Holobrádek =

Czech rower

Personal information
- Nationality: Czech
- Born: 8 February 1915; Břeclav, Austria-Hungary
- Died: 13 January 1986 (aged 70)

Sport
- Sport: Rowing

Jan Holobrádek (8 February 1915 – 13 January 1986) was a Czech rower. He competed in the men's eight event at the 1936 Summer Olympics.
