= Rudolf Homberger =

Swiss rower

Personal information
- Born: Rudolf Felix Homberger; 11 April 1910 Schaffhausen, Switzerland
- Died: 13 April 1999 (aged 89)
- Height: 188 cm (6 ft 2 in)

Sport
- Sport: Rowing
Medal record
Men's rowing
Representing Switzerland
European Rowing Championships
Silver medal – second place	1935 Berlin	Eight

Rudolf Felix Homberger (11 April 1910 – 13 April 1999) was a Swiss rower.

== Biography ==
Homberger was born in 1910 in Schaffhausen, Switzerland. Two of his brothers, Hans Homberger (born 1908) and Alex Homberger (born 1912), were also competitive rowers.

Homberger competed at the 1935 European Rowing Championships in Berlin with the Swiss eight; both his brothers were also in the boat. They won the silver medal, beaten for gold by the team from Hungary. The three brothers competed at the 1936 Summer Olympics in Berlin with the men's eight where they came sixth. Whilst the Swiss had been the favourites for the men's eight event, four of them had already competed in the coxed four and coxless four events that day (including both Homberger's brothers) and they were exhausted when the final for the eight was raced.

Homberger was a pilot and during WWII, he was a member of the Swiss Air Force.
