= 1935 European Rowing Championships =

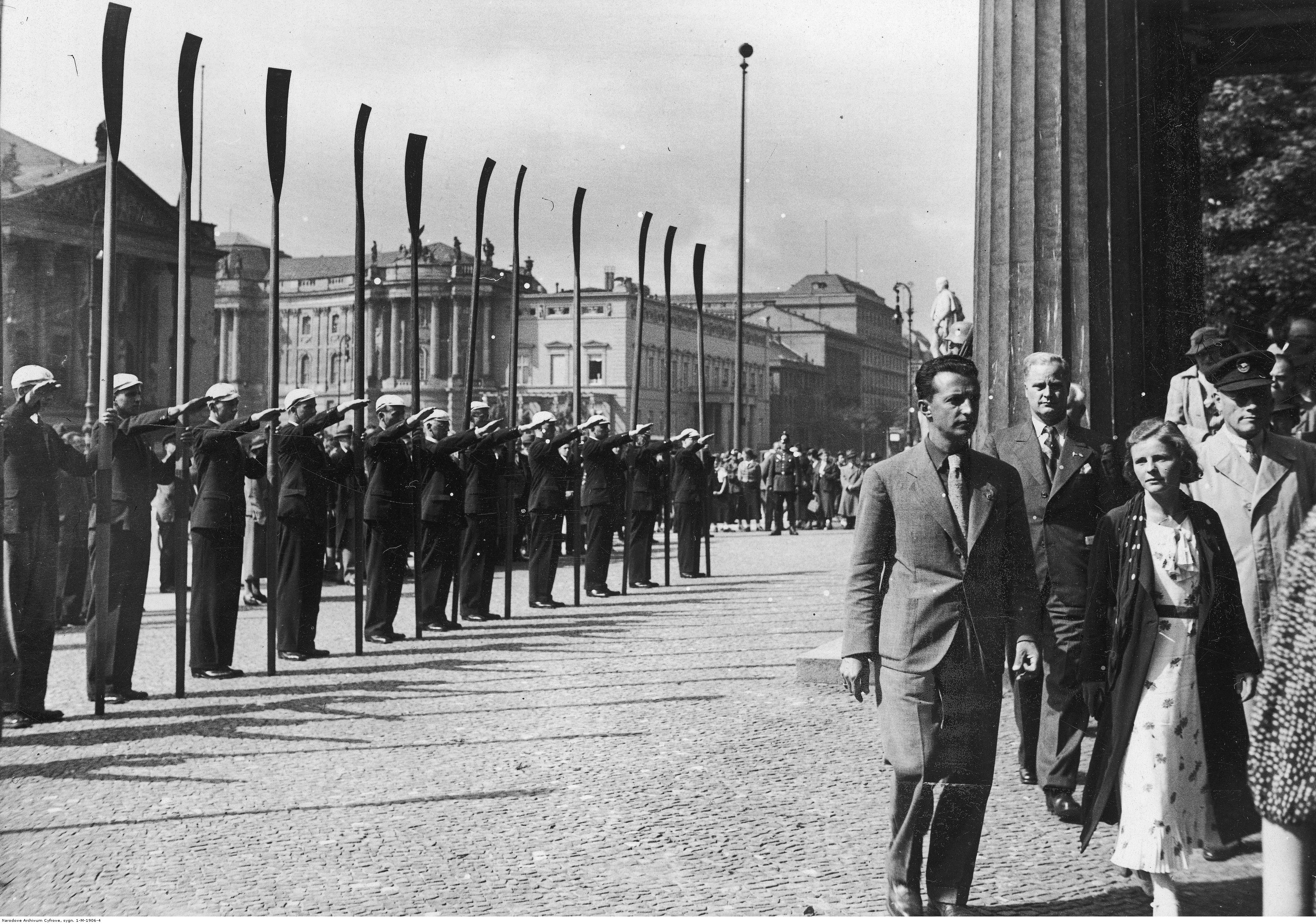
- Rowers giving a Nazi salute while placing a wreath on the Tomb of the Unknown Soldier
- Venue: Berlin-Grünau Regatta Course
- Location: Grünau, Berlin, Germany
- Dates: August

The 1935 European Rowing Championships were rowing championships for men held on the Berlin-Grünau Regatta Course in the German capital of Berlin. The event was a test run for the rowing part of the 1936 Summer Olympics that were to be held at the same venue. The rowers competed in all seven Olympic boat classes (M1x, M2x, M2-, M2+, M4-, M4+, M8+).

== Medal summary ==
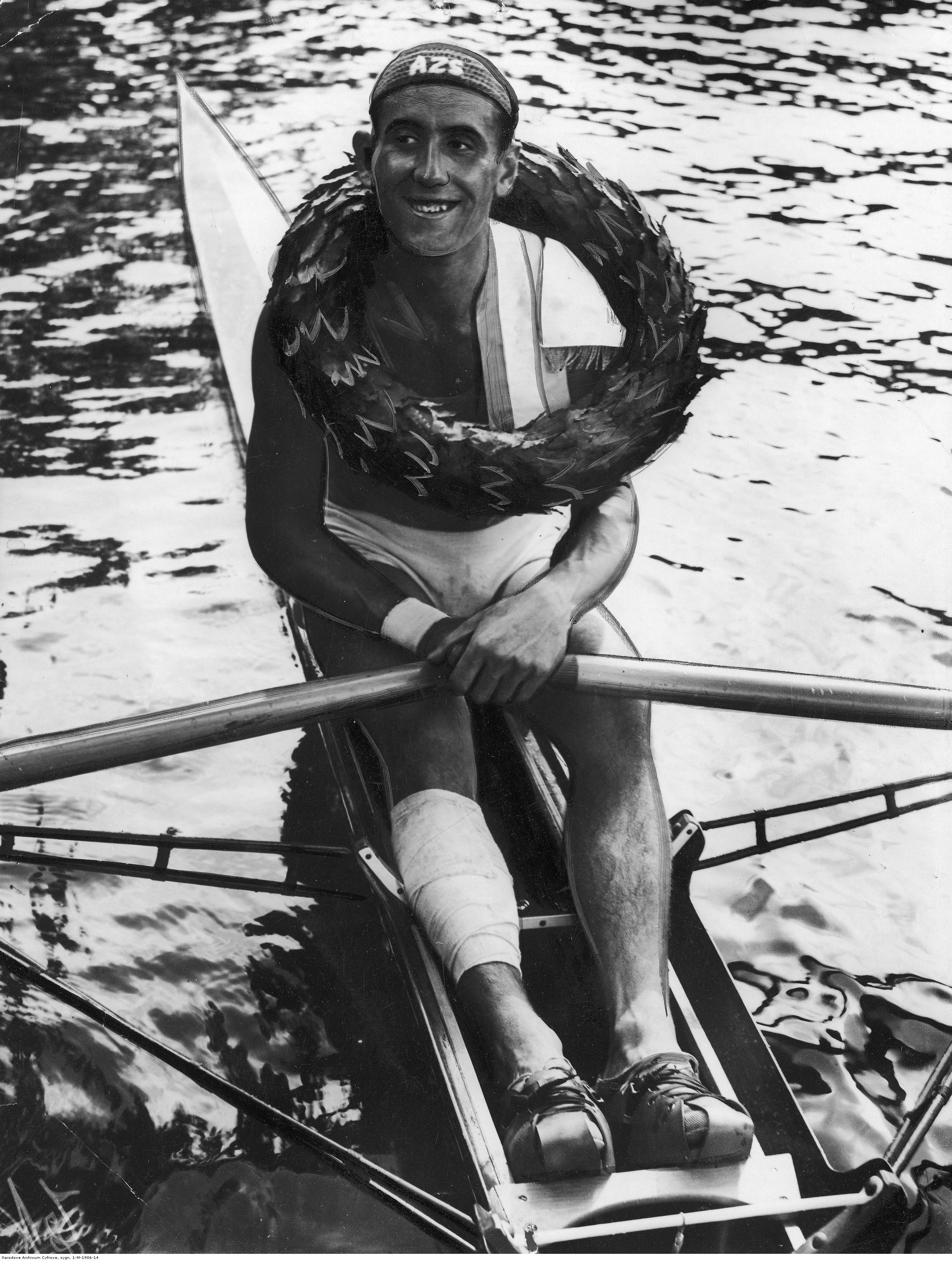
Roger Verey from Poland won gold in single sculls

Event	Gold		Silver		Bronze	
Event	Country & rowers	Time	Country & rowers	Time	Country & rowers	Time
M1x	Poland; Roger Verey		Switzerland; Eugen Studach		Austria; Josef Hasenöhrl	
M2x	Poland; Roger Verey; Jerzy Ustupski		Nazi Germany; Ralf Ritter; Hubert Remagen		France; André Giriat; Robert Jacquet	
M2-	Hungary; Károly Győry; Tibor Mamusich		Nazi Germany; Paul Heyroth; Erhard Schmidt		Austria; Rudolf Höpfler; Camillo Winkler	
M2+	Italy; Almiro Bergamo; Guido Santin; Luciano Negrini (cox)		Nazi Germany; Friedrich Devantier; Wilhelm Tietz; Werner Klatte (cox)		Poland; Stanisław Kuryłłowicz; Witalis Leporowski; Mieczysław Bącler (cox)	
M4-	Switzerland; Hermann Betschart; Hans Homberger; Alex Homberger; Karl Schmid		Austria; Hans Binder; Wilhelm Pichler; Camillo Winkler; Rudolf Höpfler		Italy; Mario Lazzati; Ermenegildo Manfredini; Carlo Zuccaro; Augusto Ripamonti	
M4+	Nazi Germany; Rudolf Eckstein; Anton Rom; Ernst Gaber; Wilhelm Menne; Johann Pfadenhauer (cox)		France; Marcel Chauvigné; Jean Cosmat; Marcel Vandernotte; Fernand Vandernotte; Noël Vandernotte (cox)		Italy; Valerio Perentin; Giliante D'Este; Nicolò Vittori; Umberto Vittori; Renato Petronio (cox)	
M8+	Hungary; Pál Domonkos; Imre Kapossy; Antal Szendey; Sándor von Korompay; Gábor Alapy; Frigyes Hollósi; László Szabó; Hugó Ballya; Ervin Kereszthy (cox)		Switzerland; Hans Steiner; Ernst Rufli; Rudolf Homberger; Max Schuler; Hermann Betschart; Hans Homberger; Alex Homberger; Karl Schmid; August Hegetschweiler (cox)		France; Émile Lecuirot; Bernard Batillat; Henri Souharce; Alphonse Bouton; Daniel Guilbert; R. Picot; A. Desvergnes; Guy Levret; Robert Léon (cox)	
