= Alphonse Bouton =

French rower (1908–1989)

Personal information
- Born: 15 April 1908 Sanssat, France
- Died: 27 April 1989 (aged 81) Paris, France

Sport
- Sport: Rowing
Medal record
Men's rowing
Representing France
European Rowing Championships
Silver medal – second place	1934 Lucerne	Coxed pair
Bronze medal – third place	1935 Berlin	Eight

Alphonse Bouton (15 April 1908 – 27 April 1989) was a French rower. He competed at the 1936 Summer Olympics in Berlin with the men's eight where they were eliminated in the semi-final.
