= Masaru Kashiwahara =

Japanese rower

Personal information
- Nationality: Japanese
- Born: 30 October 1914

Sport
- Sport: Rowing

Masaru Kashiwahara (born 30 October 1914) was a Japanese rower. He competed in the men's eight event at the 1936 Summer Olympics.
