= Takeo Hori =

Japanese rower

Personal information
- Nationality: Japanese
- Born: 1 May 1913

Sport
- Sport: Rowing

Takeo Hori (born 1 May 1913) was a Japanese rower. He competed in the men's eight event at the 1936 Summer Olympics.
