= Isamu Mita =

Japanese rower

Personal information
- Nationality: Japanese
- Born: 25 March 1913

Sport
- Sport: Rowing

Isamu Mita (born 25 March 1913) was a Japanese rower. He competed in the men's eight event at the 1936 Summer Olympics.
