= Donald Hume (rower) =

American rower (1915–2001)

Medal record

Men's rowing

Representing the United States

Olympic Games
Gold medal – first place	1936 Berlin	Men's eight

Donald Bruce Hume (July 25, 1915 – September 16, 2001) was an American rower who won Olympic gold at the 1936 Summer Olympics.

Hume attended school in Anacortes, Washington where he graduated from high school in 1933. It was after he graduated that his parents moved to Olympia, Washington. From his years in Anacortes, on Fidalgo Island, he became familiar with the waterways of Puget Sound. He stroked the University of Washington senior varsity eights which won US national Intercollegiate Rowing Association titles in 1936 and 1937. In 1936, he won the Olympic gold medal rowing in the stroke seat of the American boat in the eights competition. His role in the University of Washington eight and their Olympic victory is explored in the 2013 non-fiction book by author Daniel James Brown, The Boys in the Boat.

During WWII Hume served in the Merchant Marine. Post-war his career was in oil and gas exploration. He served a term as President of the West Coast Mining Association.
