= Arno Franzen =

Brazilian rower 1918–1976

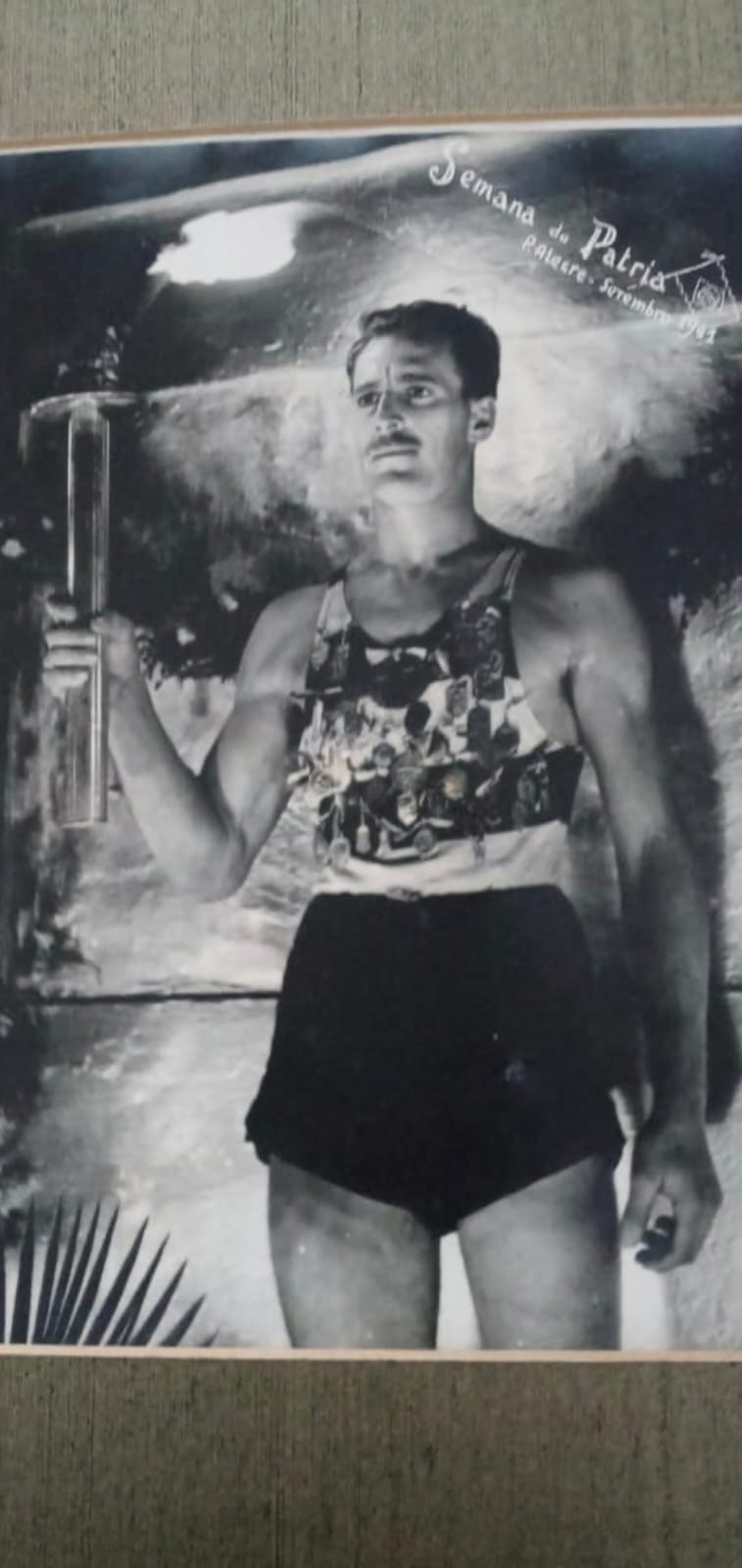
- a photo of Arno Franzen, taken in September 1941

Personal information
- Nationality: Brazilian
- Born: 14 January 1916; Montenegro, Brazil
- Died: 21 May 1976 (aged 58); Porto Alegre, Brazil

Sport
- Sport: Rowing

Arno Franzen (14 January 1918 – 21 May 1976) was a Brazilian rower. He competed in the men's eight event at the 1936 Summer Olympics.
