= Rodolpho Rath =

Brazilian rower

Personal information
- Born: 18 June 1905; Porto Alegre, Brazil
- Died: 22 August 1973 (aged 68); Estrela, Rio Grande do Sul, Brazil

Sport
- Sport: Rowing

Rodolpho Rath (18 June 1905 – 22 August 1973) was a Brazilian rower. He competed in the men's eight event at the 1936 Summer Olympics.
