= Gerd Völs =

German rower

Personal information
- Born: 22 December 1909
- Died: 15 March 1991 (aged 81) Hanover, Germany

Sport
- Sport: Rowing
- Club: RG Wiking Berlin 1896
Medal record
Men's rowing
Representing Nazi Germany
Olympic Games
Bronze medal – third place	1936 Berlin	Eight

Gerd Völs (22 December 1909 – 15 March 1991) was a German rower who competed in the 1936 Summer Olympics. In 1936 he won the bronze medal as crew member of the German boat in the men's eight competition.
