= Claude Lowenstein =

French rower (1921–2010)

Personal information
- Born: 26 October 1921
- Died: 22 November 2010 (aged 89)

Sport
- Sport: Rowing
Medal record
Men's rowing
Representing France
European Rowing Championships
| Silver medal – second place | 1934 Lucerne | Coxed pair |

Claude Lowenstein (26 October 1921 – 22 November 2010) was a French coxswain. He competed at the 1936 Summer Olympics in Berlin with the men's eight where they were eliminated in the semi-final.
