= Jack Cunningham (rower) =

Canadian rower

Personal information
- Born: 26 February 1912; Hamilton, Ontario, Canada
- Died: 28 July 1975 (aged 63); Hamilton, Ontario, Canada

Sport
- Sport: Rowing

Jack Cunningham (26 February 1912 – 28 July 1975) was a Canadian rower. He competed in the men's eight event at the 1936 Summer Olympics.
