= Henrique Kranen =

Brazilian rower

Personal information
- Born: 26 July 1911; Porto Alegre, Brazil
- Died: 30 January 1974 (aged 62); Porto Alegre, Brazil

Sport
- Sport: Rowing

Henrique Kranen (26 July 1911 – 30 January 1974) was a Brazilian rower. He competed in the men's eight event at the 1936 Summer Olympics.
