= Yoshiteru Suzuki =

Japanese rower

Personal information
- Nationality: Japanese
- Born: 8 October 1909

Sport
- Sport: Rowing

Yoshiteru Suzuki (鈴木 善照, Suzuki Yoshiteru, born 8 October 1909) was a Japanese rower. He competed in the men's eight event at the 1936 Summer Olympics.
