= Frederico Tadewald =

Brazilian rower

Personal information
- Born: 19 January 1908 Porto Alegre, Brazil
- Died: 13 April 1955 (aged 47)

Sport
- Sport: Rowing

Frederico Tadewald (19 January 1908 – 13 April 1955) was a Brazilian rower. He competed in the men's eight event at the 1936 Summer Olympics.
