= Špiro Grubišić =

Croatian rower

Personal information
- Nationality: Croatian
- Born: 2 January 1904; Šibenik, Austria-Hungary
- Died: 26 December 1985 (aged 81); Šibenik, Yugoslavia

Sport
- Sport: Rowing

Špiro Grubišić (2 January 1904 – 26 December 1985) was a Croatian rower. He competed in the men's eight event at the 1936 Summer Olympics.
