= Ladislav Smolík =

Czech rower

Personal information
- Nationality: Czech
- Born: 25 June 1909
- Died: ?

Sport
- Sport: Rowing

Ladislav Smolík (25 June 1909 – ?) was a Czech rower. He competed in the men's eight event at the 1936 Summer Olympics.
