= Wilhelm Mahlow =

German rower

Personal information
- Born: 18 January 1914 Berlin, Germany
- Died: 9 February 1999 (aged 85)

Sport
- Sport: Rowing
- Club: RG Wiking Berlin 1896
Medal record
Men's rowing
Representing Nazi Germany
Olympic Games
| Bronze medal – third place | 1936 Berlin | Eight |
European Rowing Championships
| Silver medal – second place | 1937 Amsterdam | Coxed four |

Wilhelm Mahlow (18 January 1914 – 9 February 1999) was a German rower who competed in the 1936 Summer Olympics. In 1936 he won the bronze medal as coxswain of the German boat in the men's eight.
