= Osamu Kitamura =

Japanese rower

Personal information
- Nationality: Japanese
- Born: 29 June 1912

Sport
- Sport: Rowing

Osamu Kitamura (born 29 June 1912, date of death unknown) was a Japanese rower. He competed in the men's eight event at the 1936 Summer Olympics.
