= Grey McLeish =

Canadian rower

Personal information
- Born: 27 April 1915; Toronto, Ontario, Canada
- Died: 20 June 1957 (aged 42); Toul, France

Sport
- Sport: Rowing

Grey McLeish (27 April 1915 – 20 June 1957) was a Canadian rower. He competed in the men's eight event at the 1936 Summer Olympics.
