= Heinz Kaufmann =

German rower (1913–1997)

Personal information
- Born: Heinz Werner Alfred Kaufmann; 20 September 1913 Berlin
- Died: 31 August 1997 (aged 83) Berlin

Sport
- Sport: Rowing
- Club: RG Wiking Berlin 1896
Medal record
Men's rowing
Representing Nazi Germany
Olympic Games
Bronze medal – third place	1936 Berlin	Eight
European Rowing Championships
Silver medal – second place	1937 Amsterdam	Coxed four

Heinz Werner Alfred Kaufmann (20 September 1913 – 31 August 1997) was a German rower who competed in the 1936 Summer Olympics.

In 1936, he won the bronze medal as a crew member of the German eight boat in the men's eight competition. The German team lost to the American and Italian teams by a second.

A year later, he earned the German national title with the coxed fours, and won the European title as well.

In 1941, he won his last German title with the eights.
