= Maximo Fava =

Brazilian rower

Personal information
- Born: 12 August 1911; Garibaldi, Brazil
- Died: 12 November 1983 (aged 72); Porto Alegre, Brazil

Sport
- Sport: Rowing

Maximo Fava (12 August 1911 – 12 November 1983) was a Brazilian rower. He competed in the men's eight event at the 1936 Summer Olympics.
