= Nilo Franzen =

Brazilian rower (1902–1980)

Personal information
- Born: 9 August 1912; Garibaldi, Brazil
- Died: 19 March 1980 (aged 77)

Sport
- Sport: Rowing

Nilo Franzen (9 August 1902 – 19 March 1980) was a Brazilian rower. He competed in the men's eight event at the 1936 Summer Olympics.
