= Fritz Feldmann =

Swiss rower

Personal information
- Birth name: Fritz Karl Feldmann
- Born: 15 December 1915; Winterthur, Switzerland
- Died: 28 August 2002 (aged 86); Santa Barbara, California, United States

Sport
- Sport: Rowing
- Club: RC Zürich

Fritz Karl Feldmann (15 December 1915 – 28 August 2002) was a Swiss rower. He competed at the 1936 Summer Olympics in Berlin with the men's eight where they came sixth.
