= Antonín Hrstka =

Czech rower

Personal information
- Nationality: Czech
- Born: 5 January 1908

Sport
- Country: Czechoslovakia
- Sport: Rowing

Antonín Hrstka (born 5 January 1908, date of death unknown) was a Czech rower. He competed for Czechoslovakia in the men's eight event at the 1936 Summer Olympics.
