= Len Einsaar =

Australian rower

Personal information
- Full name: Leonard Alexander Einsaar
- Born: 28 May 1913 Killingworth, New South Wales
- Died: 24 June 1994 (aged 81) Singleton, New South Wales

Sport
- Sport: Rowing

Leonard Alexander Einsaar (28 May 1913 – 24 June 1994) was an Australian RAAF officer and Olympic rower. He competed in the men's eight at the 1936 Summer Olympics in Berlin.

== Rowing career ==
Einsaar was a member of the New South Wales Police Rowing Club, whose 1936 men's eight dominated the Sydney racing season, the New South Wales state titles and won the Henley-on-Yarra event. They were selected in-toto to represent Australia at the 1936 Summer Olympics which were held in Berlin. The men's eight did not perform to its best ability and finished their heat in fourth place out of five crews. The next day in the repechage they finished in second place and so were eliminated.

== War service ==
Standing at 6' 4", Einsaar was a policeman at Broken Hill, New South Wales and in September 1940 he enlisted and joined the Royal Australian Air Force and trained to be a pilot. Sgt Einsaar became a skilful and determined pilot and in December 1942, whilst on a sortie the plane he was flying was badly damaged when attacked by enemy planes, and when he was 50 miles away from Benghazi he skillfully ditched the plane in to the sea which burst in to flames, he managed to get clear and stayed in the water for three and half hours before being picked up by the Navy, sadly four of the seven crew died.

On April 12, 1943, his Marauder aircraft he was flying was shot down six miles away from Malta and he was picked up by Italian fishermen and made prisoner of war, he was held at Camp Macerata, in late September he managed to escape and spent many months trying to find some allied territory, which he did in May or June 1944, and he returned to Australia in September 1944.

He was later commissioned as Pilot Officer and then promoted to Flying Officer before being discharged from the RAAF in November 1945, he would then get married and become the manager of the Agricultural Hotel in Singleton.
