= Haruyoshi Nakagawa =

Japanese rower

Personal information
- Nationality: Japanese
- Born: 29 March 1911

Sport
- Sport: Rowing

Haruyoshi Nakagawa (born 29 March 1911) was a Japanese rower. He competed in the men's eight event at the 1936 Summer Olympics.
