= Desmond Kingsford =

British rower (1914–1944)

Personal information
- Nationality: British (English)
- Born: 24 July 1914 Dublin, Ireland
- Died: 10 August 1944 (aged 30) Valdallière, Calvados, France

Sport
- Sport: Rowing
- Club: London Rowing Club
Medal record
Men's Rowing
Representing England
British Empire Games
Gold medal – first place	1938 Sydney	Eights

Desmond Glover Kingsford (24 July 1914 – 10 August 1944) was a rower who competed for Great Britain at the 1936 Summer Olympics. He was killed in action during the Second World War.

== Biography ==
Kingsford was the son of Douglas Hollingshead Kingsford of Calgary, Alberta, Canada, and his wife Margaret. He was educated at Pembroke College, Cambridge. In 1935, with his brother Annesley Kingsford, he was a member of the winning Cambridge boat in the Boat Race. He was in the winning crew again in 1936. He was also a member of the crew of the eight which came fourth representing Great Britain at the 1936 Summer Olympics in Berlin.

In 1937 he was runner-up in the Silver Goblets at Henley Royal Regatta competing for London Rowing Club when he partnered G M Lewis. At the 1938 British Empire Games he was a member of the English boat which won the gold medal in the eights competition.

Kingsford joined the Irish Guards as an officer, having been commissioned into the regiment in February 1940, and served in World War II. He was awarded the Military Cross for action on 3 August 1944 when he commanded a combat group ordered to seize the crossroads near Saint-Charles-de-Percy. They were initially held up by machine-gun and anti-tank fire but achieved their objective on the third attempt. His medal citation noted:

He handled his group with great skill and daring. Had Captain Kingsford not persisted in his efforts to overcome this opposition, great delay would have been imposed in the execution of the Divisional plan.

A week later he was killed in action at Tilly-sur-Seulles.

== See also ==
- List of Cambridge University Boat Race crews
