= Annesley Kingsford =

Canadian rower

Annesley Douglas Kingsford (30 July 1912 – 1 April 2006) was a Canadian rower who competed for Great Britain at the 1936 Summer Olympics.

Kingsford was born in Dublin, the son of Douglas Hollingshead Kingsford of Calgary, Alberta, Canada, and his wife Margaret. He was educated at Uppingham School and Pembroke College, Cambridge. In 1934, he was a member of the winning Cambridge boat in the Boat Race. He was in the winning crew again in 1935 when his brother Desmond Kingsford was also in the crew. In 1936, he was a member of the crew of the eight which came fourth representing Great Britain at the 1936 Summer Olympics in Berlin.

He then served in the Royal Navy and later emigrated with his wife to Canada where he started a successful career in the oil industry. He also acquired the OH ranch during this time. He was also a member of the Glencoe Club and is featured on the "Glencoe at the Olympics" wall.

Kingsford married Marie Harvie in Basra, Iraq. They had three children, Patrick, Douglas, and Kelly. His grandchildren live mostly in Canada, except for Kelly's children, Brogan Lamoureux and Boyd Lamoureux, who live in Australia.

Kingsford died in Qualicum Beach, British Columbia, Canada at the age of 93.

== See also ==
- List of Cambridge University Boat Race crews
