= Imre Kapossy =

Hungarian rower

Personal information
- Born: 26 October 1915 Budapest, Hungary
- Died: 23 June 2005 (aged 89)

Sport
- Sport: Rowing
Medal record
Men's rowing
Representing Hungary
European Rowing Championships
Gold medal – first place	1935 Berlin	Eight

Imre Kapossy (26 October 1915 – 23 June 2005) was a Hungarian rower. He competed at the 1936 Summer Olympics in Berlin with the men's eight where they came fifth.
