= Remond Larsen =

Danish rower (1914–2007)

Personal information
- Born: 30 March 1914 Copenhagen, Denmark
- Died: 18 June 2007 (aged 93) Copenhagen, Denmark

Sport
- Sport: Rowing
- Club: Københavns Roklub
Medal record
Men's rowing
Representing Denmark
European Rowing Championships
Silver medal – second place	1934 Lucerne	Eight
Bronze medal – third place	1937 Amsterdam	Eight

Remond Kaj Larsen (30 March 1914 – 18 June 2007) was a Danish rower. He competed at the 1936 Summer Olympics in Berlin with the men's coxed pair where they came fourth.
