= Émile Lecuirot =

French rower (1907–1988)

Personal information
- Born: 23 May 1907 Joinville-le-Pont, France
- Died: 28 January 1988 (aged 80)

Sport
- Sport: Rowing
Medal record
Men's rowing
Representing France
European Rowing Championships
Gold medal – first place	1931 Paris	Eight
Bronze medal – third place	1934 Lucerne	Coxless four
Bronze medal – third place	1935 Berlin	Eight

Émile Lecuirot (23 May 1907 – 28 January 1988) was a French rower. He competed at the 1928 Summer Olympics in Amsterdam with the men's coxless four where they were eliminated in the round one repêchage.
