= Coullons =

- Commune
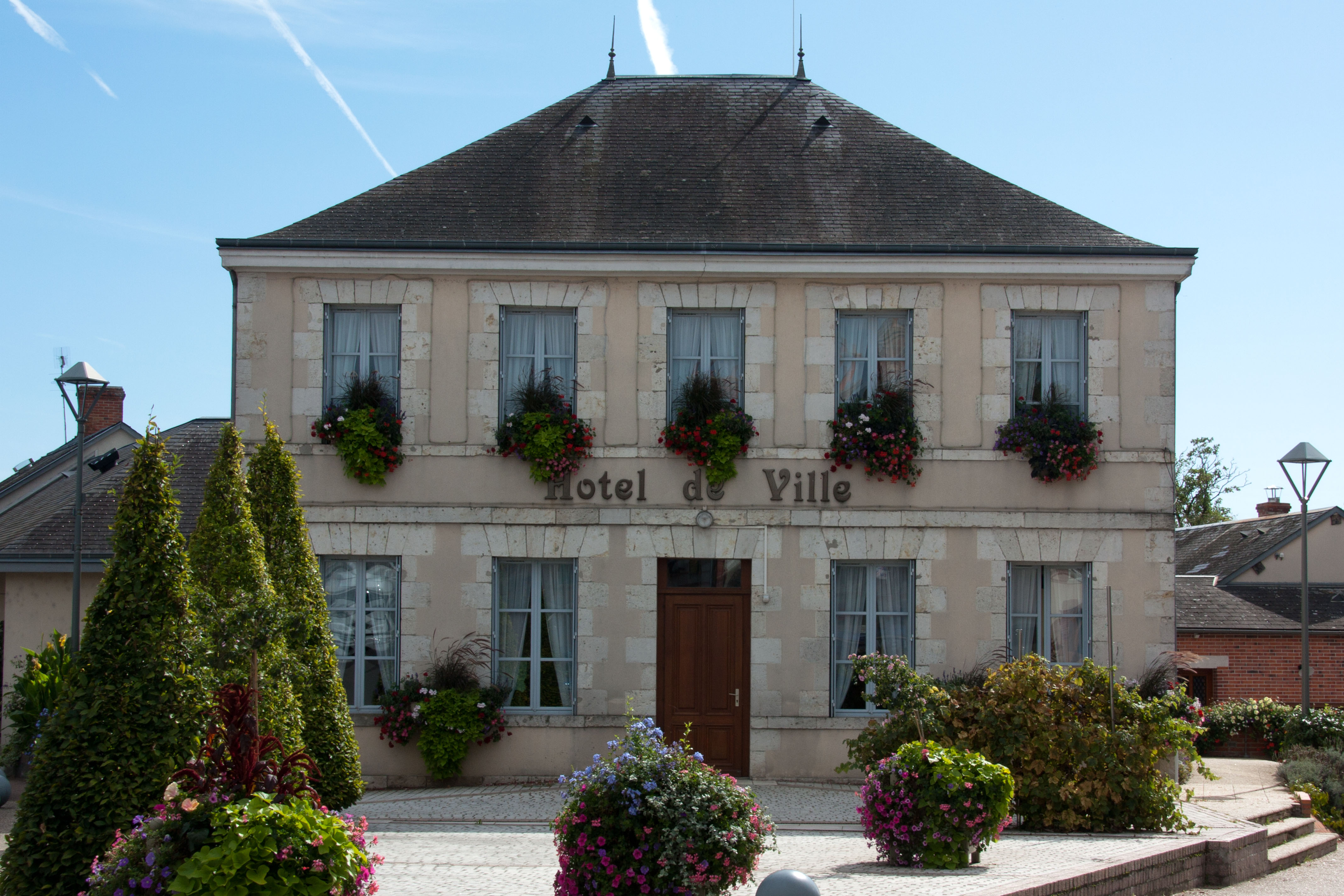
- The town hall in Coulons
- Location of Coullons
- Location within France Location within Centre-Val de Loire
- Coordinates: 47°37′16″N 2°29′36″E
- Country: France
- Region: Centre-Val de Loire
- Department: Loiret
- Arrondissement: Montargis
- Canton: Sully-sur-Loire

Government
  - Mayor (2020–2026): David Boucher
- Area^{1}: 78.97 km^{2} (30.49 sq mi)
- Highest elevation: 205 m (673 ft)
- Lowest elevation: 130 m (430 ft)
- Population (2023): 2,231
  - Density: 28.25/km^{2} (73.17/sq mi)
- Demonym(s): Coullonnaises, Coullonnais
- Time zone: UTC+01:00 (CET)
  - Summer (DST): UTC+02:00 (CEST)
- INSEE/Postal code: 45108 /45720
- Website: www.coullons.fr
- ^{1} French Land Register data, which excludes lakes, ponds, glaciers > 1 km^{2} (0.386 sq mi or 247 acres) and river estuaries.

Coullons (French pronunciation: [kulɔ̃]) is a commune in the Loiret department in north-central France.

== Population ==
Historical population
Year	Pop.	±% p.a.
1968	2,060	—
1975	2,067	+0.05%
1982	2,046	−0.15%
1990	2,258	+1.24%
1999	2,274	+0.08%
2007	2,401	+0.68%
2012	2,472	+0.58%
2017	2,370	−0.84%
2023	2,231	−1.00%
Source: INSEE

== See also ==
- Communes of the Loiret department
