= Marjan Zaninović =

Croatian rower

Personal information
- Nationality: Croatian
- Born: 2 February 1911; Šibenik, Austria-Hungary
- Died: 24 December 1968 (aged 57); Šibenik, Yugoslavia

Sport
- Sport: Rowing

Marjan Zaninović (2 February 1911 – 24 December 1968) was a Croatian rower. He competed in the men's eight event at the 1936 Summer Olympics.
