= Jean Cottez =

French rower

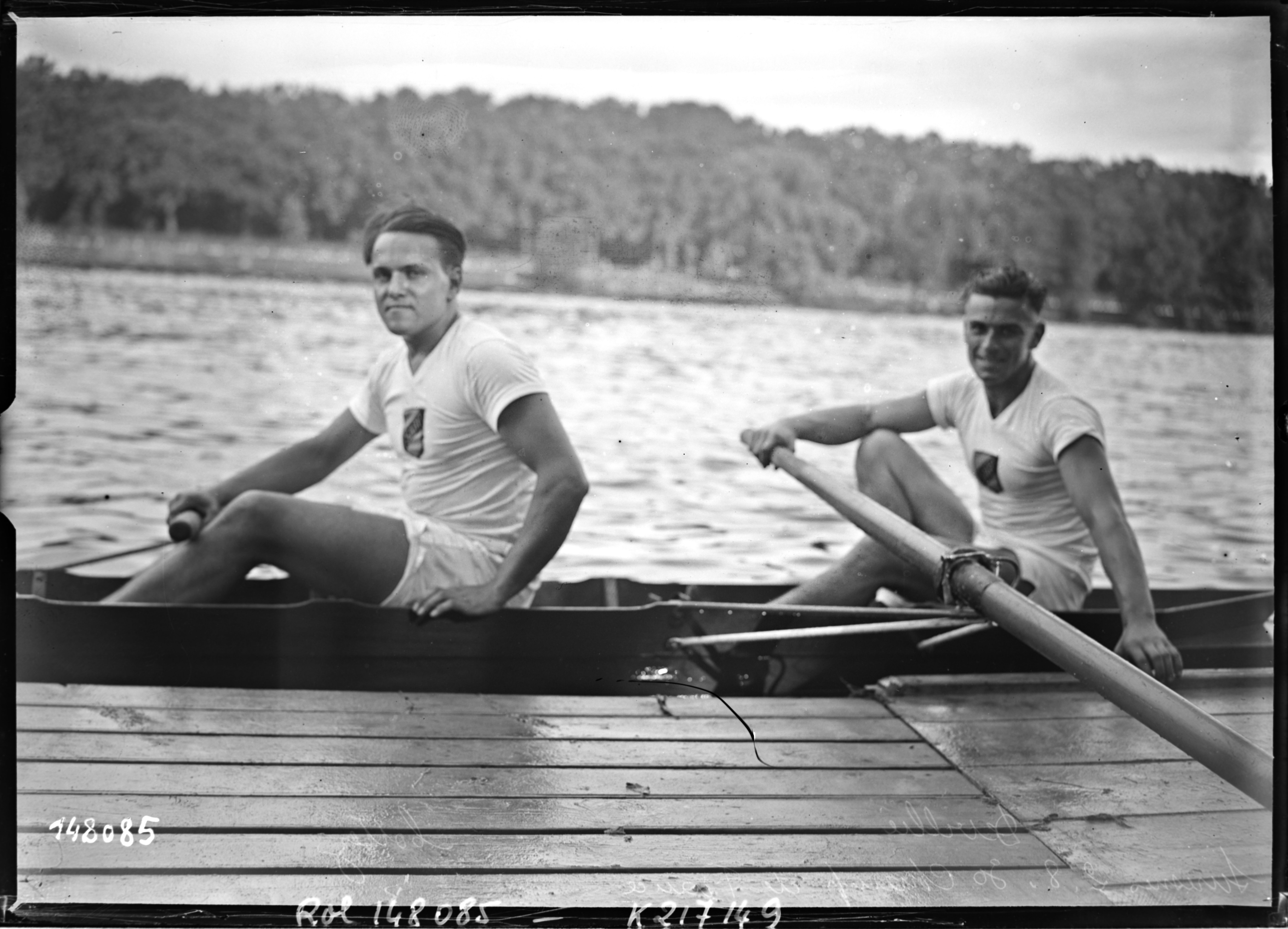
- Cottez (left) with Louis Devillié

Personal information
- Born: 7 April 1908
- Died: 11 October 1973 (aged 65)

Sport
- Sport: Rowing
- Club: Société Nautique de la Marne, Joinville-le-Pont
Medal record
Men's rowing
Representing France
European Rowing Championships
Silver medal – second place	1930 Liège	Coxed pair
Gold medal – first place	1931 Paris	Eight
Bronze medal – third place	1934 Lucerne	Coxless four

Jean Cottez (7 April 1908 – 11 October 1973) was a French rower. He competed at the 1936 Summer Olympics in Berlin with the men's eight where they were eliminated in the semi-final.
