= Ervin Kereszthy =

Hungarian rower (1909–1972)

Personal information
- Born: 5 October 1909 Budapest, Hungary
- Died: 15 July 1972 (aged 62)

Sport
- Sport: Rowing
Medal record
Men's rowing
Representing Hungary
European Rowing Championships
| Silver medal – second place | 1933 Budapest | Coxed four |
| Gold medal – first place | 1935 Berlin | Eight |

Ervin Kereszthy (5 October 1909 – 15 July 1972), also known as Ervin Krebs, was a Hungarian coxswain. He competed at the 1936 Summer Olympics in Berlin with the men's eight where they came fifth.
