= Enzo Bartolini =

Italian rower (1914–1998)

Personal information
- Born: 15 February 1914 Livorno
- Died: 3 July 1998 (aged 84)

Sport
- Sport: Rowing
- Club: U.C. Livornesi
Medal record
Men's rowing
Representing Italy
Olympic Games
Silver medal – second place	1936 Berlin	Eight
European Rowing Championships
Gold medal – first place	1937 Amsterdam	Eight
Bronze medal – third place	1938 Milan	Eight

Enzo Bartolini (15 February 1914 – 3 July 1998) was an Italian rower who competed in the 1936 Summer Olympics. He was born in Livorno. In 1936 he won the silver medal as crew member of the Italian boat in the men's eight event.
