= Mario Checcacci =

Italian rower

Personal information
- Born: 19 April 1910 Livorno
- Died: 17 January 1987 (aged 76)

Sport
- Sport: Rowing
- Club: U.C. Livornesi
Medal record
Men's rowing
Representing Italy
Olympic Games
| Silver medal – second place | 1936 Berlin | Eight |
European Rowing Championships
| Gold medal – first place | 1937 Amsterdam | Eight |

Mario Checcacci (19 April 1910 – 17 January 1987) was an Italian rower who competed in the 1936 Summer Olympics. He was born in Livorno in 1909. In 1936 he won the silver medal as crew member of the Italian boat in the Olympic men's eight event.
