= Herbert Morris =

American rower (1915–2009)

- Morris in 1936

Personal information
- Born: July 16, 1915
- Died: July 22, 2009 (aged 94)
Medal record
Men's rowing
Representing the United States
Gold medal – first place	1936 Berlin	Men's eight

Herbert Roger Morris (July 16, 1915 – July 22, 2009) was an American rower who won Olympic gold at the 1936 Summer Olympics.

Raised in the Fremont neighborhood of Seattle, Morris rowed on Puget Sound as a boy and took up sweep-oar rowing at the University of Washington. He rowed in UW senior varsity eights which won US national Intercollegiate Rowing Association titles in 1936 and 1937. At the 1936 Summer Olympics, he won the gold medal rowing in the bow seat of the American boat in the men's eight competition.

Morris was a mechanical engineering graduate. In his professional career he worked on large-scale dredging projects in the Seattle area. He died on July 22, 2009, as the last remaining member of the crew.
