= George Elias (rower) =

Australian rower

Clyde "George" Elias
Personal information
- Nationality: Australian
- Born: 13 October 1913; Bowraville, New South Wales
- Died: 9 July 2002 (aged 88); Blacktown, New South Wales
- Education: St Joseph's College
- Occupation: Policeman

Sport
- Sport: Rowing
- Club: NSW Police Rowing Club

Achievements and titles
- National finals: King's Cup 1937

Clyde "George" Elias (13 October 1913 – 9 July 2002) was an Australian rower. He competed in the men's eight event at the 1936 Summer Olympics.

== Early life and school ==
Born in Bowraville, New South Wales Elias followed his older brother Leaton to an education at St Joseph's College, Hunters Hill. Leaton had played in the school's first XV rugby side in all three of his senior years from 1926 to 1928 and Clyde, a giant of a lad, emulated that feat. Clyde played schoolboy rugby in the open division in all five of his years at St Joseph's starting at aged 14 in 1928. He played in three successive St Joseph's 1st XVs who were premiers and champions from 1930 to 1932 in the GPS rugby competition and he made GPS representative teams in those latter two years. Clyde also rowed in the school's 1st VIII in three successive years from 1930 to 1932 and in 1932 he stroked their first VIII to victory in the GPS Head of the River.

== Senior rowing ==
The NSW Police Rowing Club was formed in 1933 and erected a shed on Blackwattle Bay. Elias joined the club and was a member of their successful 1935-36 eight which dominated the Sydney club season, won the New South Wales state championship and the Henley-on-Yarra event. They were selected in toto as Australia's men's eight to compete at the 1936 Berlin Olympics with their attendance funded by the NSW Police Federation with no assistance from the Australian Olympic Federation. The Australian eight with Elias in the four seat finished fourth in its heat, behind Hungary, Italy and Canada. It failed to qualify through the repechage to the final.

Elias rowed on after the Olympics and in 1937 made state selection in the New South Wales men's eight which contested and placed second in the King's Cup at the Interstate Regatta.
