= William Cross (rower) =

Australian rower

Personal information
- Nationality: Australian
- Born: 22 March 1908
- Died: 8 August 1993 (aged 85) Northbridge, New South Wales, Australia

Sport
- Sport: Rowing
- Club: Sydney Police Rowing Club

Achievements and titles
- National finals: King's Cup 1935

William Cross (22 March 1908 – 8 August 1993) was an Australian rower. He was an Australian champion who competed in the men's eight event at the 1936 Summer Olympics.

Cross rowed for the New South Wales Police club in Sydney and along with three other Police rowers was selected to the New South Wales state eight which contested and won the 1935 King's Cup. In 1936 the Police Club's eight dominated the Sydney racing season, the New South Wales state titles and won the Henley-on-Yarra event. They were selected in toto as Australia's men's eight to compete at the 1936 Berlin Olympics with their attendance funded by the NSW Police Federation. The Australian eight with Cross at bow finished fourth in its heat, behind Hungary, Italy and Canada. It failed to qualify through the repechage to the final.
