= Olaf Klitgaard Poulsen =

Danish rower (1914–2007)

Personal information
- Nationality: Danish
- Born: 18 May 1914 Horsens, Denmark
- Died: 8 February 2007 (aged 92) Rudersdal, Denmark

Sport
- Sport: Rowing

Olaf Klitgaard Poulsen (18 May 1914 – 8 February 2007) was a Danish rower. He competed in the men's eight event at the 1936 Summer Olympics.
