= Dante Secchi =

Italian rower

Personal information
- Born: 14 August 1910 Livorno
- Died: 17 February 1981 (aged 70) Livorno

Sport
- Sport: Rowing
Medal record
Men's rowing
Representing Italy
Olympic Games
Silver medal – second place	1936 Berlin	Eight
European Rowing Championships
Silver medal – second place	1933 Budapest	Eight
Gold medal – first place	1937 Amsterdam	Eight
Bronze medal – third place	1938 Milan	Eight

Dante Secchi (14 August 1910 – 17 February 1981) was an Italian rower who competed in the 1936 Summer Olympics.

He was born and died in Livorno.

In 1936 he won the silver medal as crew member of the Italian boat in the eights event.
