= Walter Jordan (rower) =

Australian rower (1904–1997)

Personal information
- Nationality: Australian
- Born: 16 May 1904 Grafton, New South Wales
- Died: 27 July 1997 (aged 93) Armidale, New South Wales

Sport
- Sport: Rowing
- Club: Sydney Police Rowing Club

Achievements and titles
- National finals: King's Cup 1933-35

Walter Jordan (16 May 1904 – 27 June 1997) was an Australian rower. He was a three-time Australian national champion who competed in the men's eight event at the 1936 Summer Olympics.

Jordan rowed for the New South Wales Police club in Sydney. He first made state selection for New South Wales in the men's eight which contested and won the 1933 King's Cup. The following year he rowed in the 1934 New South Wales eight to another King's Cup victory. In 1935 along with three other Police rowers Jordan rowed in the New South Wales state eight which contested and won the 1935 King's Cup. In 1936 the Police Club's eight dominated the Sydney racing season, the New South Wales state titles and won the Henley-on-Yarra event. They were selected in toto as Australia's men's eight to compete at the 1936 Berlin Olympics with their attendance funded by the NSW Police Federation. The Australian eight with Jordan seated at six finished fourth in its heat, behind Hungary, Italy and Canada. It failed to qualify through the repechage to the final.
