= Gordon Adam (rower) =

American rower (1915–1992)

Medal record

Men's rowing

Representing the United States

Olympic Games
| Gold medal – first place | 1936 Berlin | Eight |

Gordon Belgum Adam (May 26, 1915 – March 27, 1992) was an American rower who won Olympic gold at the 1936 Summer Olympics.

Born in Seattle and raised on a dairy farm in Everson, Washington, Adam took up rowing at the University of Washington. He rowed in UW senior varsity eights which won US national Intercollegiate Rowing Association titles in 1936 and 1937. At the 1936 Summer Olympics, he won the gold medal rowing in the three seat of the American boat in the men's eight competition.

A mechanical engineering graduate, Adam had a 38-year career working for Boeing.

He died in Laguna Hills, California at age 76.
