= Ante Krnčević =

Croatian rower

Personal information
- Nationality: Croatian
- Born: 6 January 1909; Šibenik, Austria-Hungary
- Died: 17 October 1993 (aged 84); Sydney, New South Wales, Australia

Sport
- Sport: Rowing

Ante Krnčević (6 January 1909 – 17 October 1993) was a Croatian rower. He competed in the men's eight event at the 1936 Summer Olympics.
