= Don Fergusson =

Australian rower

Personal information
- Full name: Donald George Fergusson
- Nationality: Australian
- Born: 12 January 1912 Wickham, New South Wales, Australia
- Died: 14 February 1970 (aged 58) Sydney, Australia

Sport
- Sport: Rowing

Donald George Fergusson (12 January 1912 – 14 February 1970) was an Australian rower and police detective. He competed in the men's eight event at the 1936 Summer Olympics. Fergusson committed suicide by shooting himself in 1970.

Fergusson rowed for the New South Wales Police club in Sydney. In 1936 the Police Club's eight dominated the Sydney racing season, the New South Wales state titles and won the Henley-on-Yarra event. They were selected in toto as Australia's men's eight to compete at the 1936 Berlin Olympics with their attendance funded by the NSW Police Federation. The Australian eight with Fergusson rowing in the two seat finished fourth in its heat, behind Hungary, Italy and Canada. It failed to qualify through the repechage to the final.

A policeman and detective for 36 years, Fergusson was the Acting Metropolitan Superintendent of Police and Chief of the New South Wales Criminal Investigation Branch (CIB) at the time of his death. His suicide note referred to him suffering from a fatal disease. In 1969 he was awarded the Queen's Commendation for Brave Conduct for his part in ending the Glenfield Siege.

It has been widely rumoured that he was in fact shot by fellow police officer Fred Krahe to cover up police corruption.
