= Joe Gould (rower) =

Australian rower

Personal information
- Nationality: Australian
- Born: 24 January 1909 Moree, New South Wales, Australia
- Died: 2 November 1994 (aged 85) New South Wales, Australia
- Education: Sydney Grammar School

Sport
- Sport: Rowing
- Club: Sydney Police Rowing Club

Achievements and titles
- National finals: King's Cup 1935
Medal record
Representing Australia
British Empire Games
Silver medal – second place	1938 Sydney	M8+

Ainslie Beric "Joe" Gould (24 January 1909 – 2 November 1994) was an Australian rower. He was an Australian national champion who competed in the men's eight event at the 1936 Summer Olympics.

== Club and state rowing ==
Gould was educated at Sydney Grammar School where he took up rowing. He rowed for the New South Wales Police Club in Sydney and along with three other police rowers was selected to the New South Wales state eight which contested and won the 1935 King's Cup. In 1938 he again rowed in the New South Wales men's eight at the Interstate Regatta.

== International representative rowing ==
In 1936 the NSW Police Club's eight dominated the Sydney racing season, the New South Wales state titles and won the Henley-on-Yarra event. They were selected in toto as Australia's men's eight to compete at the 1936 Berlin Olympics with their attendance funded by the NSW Police Federation. The Australian eight with Gould rowing at seven finished fourth in the heat, behind Hungary, Italy and Canada. They failed to move through the repechage to the final.

In 1938 Gould was one of five New South Welshman selected in the men's eight for the 1938 Commonwealth Games. That eight, with Gould rowing in the seven seat, took the silver medal behind the British crew.
