= Poul Byrge Poulsen =

Danish rower

Personal information
- Born: 11 April 1915 Frederikssund, Denmark
- Died: 7 December 1994 (aged 79) Copenhagen, Denmark

Sport
- Sport: Rowing
- Club: Københavns Roklub
Medal record
Men's rowing
Representing Denmark
European Rowing Championships
Bronze medal – third place	1937 Amsterdam	Eight

Poul Byrge Poulsen (11 April 1915 – 7 December 1994) was a Danish rower. He competed at the 1936 Summer Olympics in Berlin with the men's eight, where they were eliminated in round one.
