= Carl Berner (rower) =

Danish rower

Personal information
- Born: Carl Ludvig Berner; 27 February 1913 Copenhagen, Denmark
- Died: 30 October 2003 (aged 90) Hørsholm, Denmark

Sport
- Sport: Rowing
Medal record
Men's rowing
Representing Denmark
European Rowing Championships
Silver medal – second place	1934 Lucerne	Eight
Bronze medal – third place	1937 Amsterdam	Eight

Carl Ludvig Berner (27 February 1913 – 30 October 2003) was a Danish rower. He competed at the 1936 Summer Olympics in Berlin with the men's coxed pair where they came fourth. At the same Olympics, he also competed with the men's eight; that team was eliminated in round one.
