= Oreste Grossi =

Italian rower (1912–2008)

Personal information
- Born: 14 March 1912 Livorno
- Died: 16 February 2008 (aged 95) Livorno

Sport
- Sport: Rowing
Medal record
Men's rowing
Representing Italy
Olympic Games
Silver medal – second place	1936 Berlin	Eight
European Rowing Championships
Gold medal – first place	1937 Amsterdam	Eight
Bronze medal – third place	1938 Milan	Eight

Oreste Grossi (14 March 1912 – 16 February 2008) was an Italian rower who competed in the 1936 Summer Olympics.

He was born and died in Livorno.

In 1936 he won the silver medal as crew member of the Italian boat in the men's eight event.
