= Norman Ella =

Australian rower

Personal information
- Nationality: Australian
- Born: 18 June 1910; Sydney, New South Wales
- Died: 19 January 1987 (aged 76); Epping, New South Wales

Sport
- Sport: Rowing

Norman Ella (18 June 1910 – 19 January 1987) was an Australian rowing coxswain. He competed in the men's eight event at the 1936 Summer Olympics.

== Rowing career ==
Ella rowed for the New South Wales Police club in Sydney. In 1936 the Police Club's eight dominated the Sydney racing season, the New South Wales state titles and won the Henley-on-Yarra event. They were selected in toto as Australia's men's eight to compete at the 1936 Berlin Olympics with their attendance funded by the NSW Police Federation. The Australian eight with Ella in the stern finished fourth in its heat, behind Hungary, Italy and Canada. It failed to qualify through the repechage to the final.

== War service ==
In WWII Ella served in the Australian Army. He enlisted early in the war in 1940 and had the rank of corporal when he was discharged in 1944.
