= George Hunt (rower) =

American rower (1916–1999)

Medal record

Men's rowing

Representing the United States

Olympic Games
Gold medal – first place	1936 Berlin	Men's eight

George Elwood Hunt Jr. (August 1, 1916 – September 3, 1999) was an American rower who won Olympic gold at the 1936 Summer Olympics.

Born in Puyallup, Washington, Hunt took up rowing at the University of Washington. He rowed in UW senior varsity eights which won US national Intercollegiate Rowing Association titles in 1936 and 1937. At the 1936 Summer Olympics, he won the gold medal rowing in the six seat of the American boat in the men's eight competition.

An engineering graduate, Hunt served as a Seabee in the South-Pacific theatre of WWII. He founded construction firms in Seattle and consulted on The Burien Library and Seattle University's Lemieux Library. He worked in the Port of Seattle's engineering department before retiring in 1980.
