= Werner Schweizer =

Swiss rower (1916–2003)

Personal information
- Born: 15 February 1916 Zurich, Switzerland
- Died: 25 November 2003 (aged 87) Lugano, Switzerland

Sport
- Sport: Rowing

Werner Schweizer (15 February 1916 – 25 November 2003) was a Swiss rower. He competed at the 1936 Summer Olympics in Berlin with the men's eight where they came sixth.

Schweizer died in Lugano on 25 November 2003, at the age of 87.
