= Bjørner Drøger =

Danish rower (1912 – 2003)

Personal information
- Nationality: Danish
- Born: 2 August 1912; Copenhagen, Denmark
- Died: 2 February 2003 (aged 90); Valby, Denmark

Sport
- Sport: Rowing

Bjørner Drøger (2 August 1912 – 2 February 2003) was a Danish rower. He competed in two events at the 1936 Summer Olympics.
