= Oskar Neuenschwander =

Swiss rower (born 1918)

Personal information
- Born: 3 May 1918

Sport
- Sport: Rowing

Oskar Neuenschwander (born 3 May 1918, date of death unknown) was a Swiss rower. He competed at the 1936 Summer Olympics in Berlin with the men's eight where they came sixth.
