= The Boys in the Boat =

Book by Daniel James Brown

The Boys in the Boat: Nine Americans and Their Epic Quest for Gold at the 1936 Berlin Olympics
- The front cover art of The Boys in the Boat
- Author: Daniel James Brown
- Original title: The Boys in the Boat
- Language: English
- Genre: Narrative nonfiction
- Publisher: Penguin Books
- Publication date: June 4, 2013
- Media type: Print
- Pages: 404
- ISBN: 978-0670025817

The Boys in the Boat: Nine Americans and Their Epic Quest for Gold at the 1936 Berlin Olympics is a non-fiction book written by Daniel James Brown and published on June 4, 2013.

== Background ==
The Boys in the Boat is a true story based on the struggles and sacrifices made by the Olympic gold-winning University of Washington rowing team to compete at rowing at the 1936 Summer Olympics – Men's eight. Joseph Sutton-Holcomb from The Seattle Times writes that Brown got the idea to write this book when his neighbor Judy Willman said that her father, Joe Rantz, was a fan of his works and wanted to have a conversation with the author. That conversation with Joe Rantz about life during the Great Depression led to an in-depth chat about his time as a rower at the University of Washington.

In an interview with Joseph Sutton-Holcomb from The Seattle Times, Brown emphasized that the reason he spent so much time on the build-up to the race in the book was because he thought “it's much more meaningful if you know the nine guys involved on some kind of personal level, and if you knew what the German boys wearing swastikas on their chests represented, that they weren't just another bunch of kids in a boat.”

== Plot ==
The Boys in the Boat is about the University of Washington eight-oared rowing crew that represented the United States in rowing at the 1936 Summer Olympics – Men's eight in Berlin, and narrowly beat out Italy and Germany to win the gold medal. The main character is Joe Rantz. Rantz had a tough time growing up and was abandoned by his family for several years to fend for himself.

There are two backstories. One illustrates how all nine members of the Washington team came from lower-middle-class families and had to struggle to earn their way through school during the depths of the Depression. Along with the chronicle of their victories and defeats in domestic competition, the reader learns the importance of the synchronization of the eight rowers as they respond to the commands of the coxswain and his communications with the stroke, consistent pacing, and sprint to the finish.

The second backstory begins with a depiction of Hitler decreeing construction of the spectacular German venues at which the Games would take place. Along the way, the book also describes how the Nazis successfully covered up the evidence of their harsh and inhumane treatment of the Jews and other minorities so as to win worldwide applause for the Games, duping the United States Olympic Committee, among others.

All comes together with a description of the final race. During the 1930s, rowing was a popular sport with millions following the action on the radio. The victorious Olympians became national heroes. In accordance with the strictures of amateur athletics, the boys sank into relative obscurity after their victory but were still better off than their parents and for the rest of their lives proud of their accomplishment. After their win, they would come together every few years to row again.

== Reception ==
The book became the #1 best seller for three weeks in the Paperback Nonfiction category in the New York Times bestseller list.

Timothy Egan of The New York Times wrote, "Against all odds, Brown's book has become a global phenomenon. The Boys in the Boat is about who we used to be. And who we still could be. Like the best history, its then and now wow factor is both embarrassing (to the present) and inspiring (to the future)." Laurence Raw, from The Journal of American Culture, addressed this book as being researched beautifully and highlights the woes and triumphs experienced during the Great Depression. Along with the book's praise, the book received many awards, including the 2014 Washington State Book Award.

Overall, the book received positive reactions. The Guardian stated, "The US rowing team's victory at Hitler's 1936 Olympics is charted in a dramatic Depression-era account destined for Hollywood." The News Journal includes a positive review from John Schoonver, a coxswain at St. Andrews School in 1959, who claimed that "It [the book] shows a remarkable story about the perseverance of young rowers.” In July 2014, The Delhi Press addressed that “One of the protagonists is Joe Rantz, a poor boy, whose determination to overcome odds makes him an ideal hero. The author learned the details of Rantz's brilliant rowing career from the athlete himself.” According to The Delhi Press, the author worked hard to create a book to inspire many generations. The Smithsonian highlighted how it's not a surprise that this novel has been brought to cinematic development. The figurative language and imagery Brown utilizes allow the audience to feel what the rowers are experiencing. Joseph Sutton-Holcomb from The Seattle Times said the book is more than a heartfelt coming-of-age sports saga because it exemplifies what can be accomplished when people come together.

== Adaptation ==
On March 3, 2011, The Weinstein Company acquired the film rights to The Boys in the Boat with Kenneth Branagh directing and Donna Gigliotti producing. In October 2018, Lantern Entertainment (the successor of The Weinstein Company) contracted with Metro-Goldwyn-Mayer to distribute the film worldwide. In March 2020, it was announced that actor George Clooney would direct the film.

In November 2021, it was announced that Callum Turner was cast in an unspecified role.

In February 2022, it was announced that Joel Edgerton, Jack Mulhern, Sam Strike, Luke Slattery, Tom Varey, Thomas Elms, Wil Coban, Bruce Herbelin-Earle, and Hadley Robinson were cast.

In March 2022, Courtney Henggeler and James Wolk joined the cast.

The story of the gold medal-winning crew also inspired a 2016 PBS American Experience documentary The Boys of ’36.

== Awards and honors ==
- American Booksellers Association's Adult Nonfiction Book of the Year (2014)
- American Library Association's Andrew Carnegie Medal for Excellence in Non-Fiction Selection (2014)

== See also ==
- ASUW Shell House
