= England at the 1938 British Empire Games =

- CG code: ENG
- CGA: Commonwealth Games England

in Sydney, New South Wales, Australia
- Medals Ranked 2nd: Gold 15 Silver 15 Bronze 10 Total 40

British Empire Games appearances
- 1930; 1934; 1938; 1950; 1954; 1958; 1962; 1966; 1970; 1974; 1978; 1982; 1986; 1990; 1994; 1998; 2002; 2006; 2010; 2014; 2018; 2022; 2026; 2030

England at the 1938 British Empire Games (abbreviated ENG) was the third appearance of the country at the Commonwealth Games. The Games were held in Sydney, New South Wales, Australia, from 5 February to 12 February 1938.

England finished second in the medal table behind Australia with 15 gold medals, 15 silver medals and 10 bronze medals.

== Medal table (top three) ==
| Rank | Nation | Gold | Silver | Bronze | Total |
|---|---|---|---|---|---|
| 1 | Australia | 25 | 19 | 22 | 66 |
| 2 | England | 15 | 15 | 10 | 40 |
| 3 | Canada | 13 | 16 | 15 | 44 |
| Totals (3 entries) | | 53 | 50 | 47 | 150 |

== Team ==
The athletes that competed are listed below.

=== Athletics ===
Men

| Name | Age | Occupation | Club | Medal |
|---|---|---|---|---|
| Sandy Duncan | 25 | Schoolmaster | Achilles Club | Silver medal |
| Bernard Eeles | 24 | Accountant | Southgate Harriers | none |
| Frank Handley | 27 | Clerk | Salford Harriers | , |
| Cyril Holmes | 22 | Drysalter | Manchester University AC | ,, |
| Harry Lister | 22 | School teacher | Nottingham University AC | none |
| Brian MacCabe | 23 | Advertising | London AC | Silver medal |
| John Lunn Newman | 21 | Bank clerk | London AC | none |
| Bert Norris | 39 | Civil Servant | Polytechnic Harriers | Silver medal |
| Henry Pack | 25 | Police officer | Belgrave Harriers | Silver medal |
| Ken Richardson | 19 | Cost clerk | London AC | Silver medal |
| Bill Roberts | 25 | Timber salesman | Salford Harriers | , |
| Lawrence Wallace | 20 | Student | Ryde Harriers | Silver medal |
| Peter Ward | 24 | Stockbroker | Achilles Club | Silver medal |
| Lawrence Weatherill | 32 | No profession | South London Harriers | none |
| Dick Webster | 23 | Army officer | Achilles Club | none |

Women

| Name | Age | Occupation | Club | Medal |
|---|---|---|---|---|
| Dora Gardner | 25 | Secretary | Middlesex LAC | Silver medal |
| Mary Holloway | 20 | Typist | Mitcham AC | none |
| Winifred Jeffrey | 17 | Typist | Birchfield Harriers | Silver medal |
| Gladys Lunn | 29 | P.O Clerk | Birchfield Harriers | Bronze medal |
| Ethel Raby | 23 | Comptometer operator | Middlesex LAC | , |
| Dorothy Saunders | 22 | Teacher | Spartan LAC | Silver medal |
| Kathleen Stokes | 21 | Saleswoman | London Olympiades | Silver medal |
| Kathleen Tiffen | 25 | Commercial artist | Mitcham AC | none |
| Dorothy Tyler-Odam | 17 | Typist | Mitcham AC | Gold medal |

=== Boxing ===
| Name | Age | Occupation | Club | Medal |
|---|---|---|---|---|
| William Butler | 21 | Electrician | Standard BC | Gold medal |
| Maurice Dennis | 24 | Mechanic | Northampton Polytechnic ABC | Silver medal |
| Harry Groves | 19 | Brewers Drayman | Devas ABC | Gold medal |
| Alf Harper | 24 | Mechanic | Aston ABC | none |
| Joseph Wilby | 25 | Royal Air Force | RAF BC | Bronze medal |

=== Cycling ===
| Name | Age | Occupation | Club | Medal |
|---|---|---|---|---|
| Ray Hicks | 20 | Student | Belle Vue | Silver medal |
| Ray Jones | 19 | Carpenter | Wolverhampton Wheelers | Bronze medal |
| William Maxfield | 21 | Storekeeper | Kentish Wheelers | Gold medal |
| Ernie Mills | 24 | Engineer | Addiscombe CC | Bronze medal |

=== Diving ===
Men

| Name | Age | Occupation | Club | Medal |
|---|---|---|---|---|
| Doug Tomalin | 23 | Royal Air Force | RAF/Highgate DC | , |

Women

| Name | Age | Occupation | Club | Medal |
|---|---|---|---|---|
| Jean Gilbert | 18 | Clerk | Jersey | none |

=== Lawn bowls ===
| Name | Age | Occupation | Club | Medal |
|---|---|---|---|---|
| James Cuthbert | 64 | Retired public works contractor | Wembley BC | none |
| Tommy Hills | 54 | Auctioneer & estate agent | Eltham BC | none |
| George Hiscock | 62 | Retired relieving officer | Fulham BC | none |
| Samuel Jones | 71 | Retired builder | Croydon BC | none |
| Edward Shuttle | 60 | Retired employment exchange manager | Reading BC | none |
| Edward Tappenden | 61 | Retired private secretary | Hitchin BC | none |
| Ronald Weeks | 52 | Retired farmer | Wimscombe BC | none |

=== Rowing ===
| Name | Age | Occupation | Club | Medal |
|---|---|---|---|---|
| Basil Beazley | 24 | Electrical engineer | London RC | Gold medal |
| John Burrough | 24 | Chemist | London RC | Gold medal |
| Rhodes Hambridge | 26 | Medical student | London RC | Gold medal |
| Peter H. Jackson | 25 | Accountant | London RC | , |
| Desmond Kingsford | 23 | Timber merchant | London RC | Gold medal |
| Jack Offer | 29 | Estate manager | Kingston RC | Silver medal |
| Dick Offer | 28 | Insurance | Kingston RC | Silver medal |
| William Reeve | 23 | Civil engineer | London RC | Gold medal |
| John Sturrock | 22 | Army officer | London RC | Gold medal |
| John Turnbull | 21 | Cambridge student | London RC | Gold medal |
| Tim Turner | | Australian resident | London RC | Gold medal |

=== Swimming ===
Men

| Name | Age | Occupation | Club | Medal |
|---|---|---|---|---|
| Goldup Davies | 23 | Draughtsman | Otter SC | , |
| Kenneth Deane | 16 | Student | Great Yarmouth SC | none |
| Frederick Dove | 20 | Insurance clerk | Otter SC | , |
| Mostyn Ffrench-Williams | 23 | Civil servant | Penguin SC | Gold medal |
| Bob Leivers | 22 | Master butcher | Longton ASA | ,, |
| Michael Henry Taylor | 19 | Solicitor's clerk | Sheffield SC | , |
| Norman Wainwright | 23 | Clerk | Hanley SC | , |

Women

| Name | Age | Occupation | Club | Medal |
|---|---|---|---|---|
| Lorna Frampton | 17 | Bank clerk | Hounslow SC | Gold medal |
| Zilpha Grant | 18 | Burrough's operator | South Manchester | Bronze medal |
| Joyce Harrowby | 16 | Student | Leicester SC | Bronze medal |
| Margery Hinton | 22 | Clerk | Old Trafford SC | , |
| Edna Hughes | 21 | Corporation employee | Walsall SC | Bronze medal |
| Margaret Jeffery | 17 | Bank clerk | Croydon SC | Silver medal |
| Doris Storey | 18 | Machinist | East Leeds SC | , |
| Norman Wainwright | 23 | Clerk | Hanley SC | , |

=== Wrestling ===
| Name | Age | Occupation | Club | Medal |
|---|---|---|---|---|
| Ray Cazaux | 20 | Pastry cook | College PCC, Bradford | Bronze medal |
| Leslie Jeffers | 27 | Policeman | Metropolitan Police | Bronze medal |
