= Aquatics at the 1938 British Empire Games =

- Venue: North Sydney Olympic Pool
- Location: Sydney, Australia
- Dates: 5 – 12 February 1938

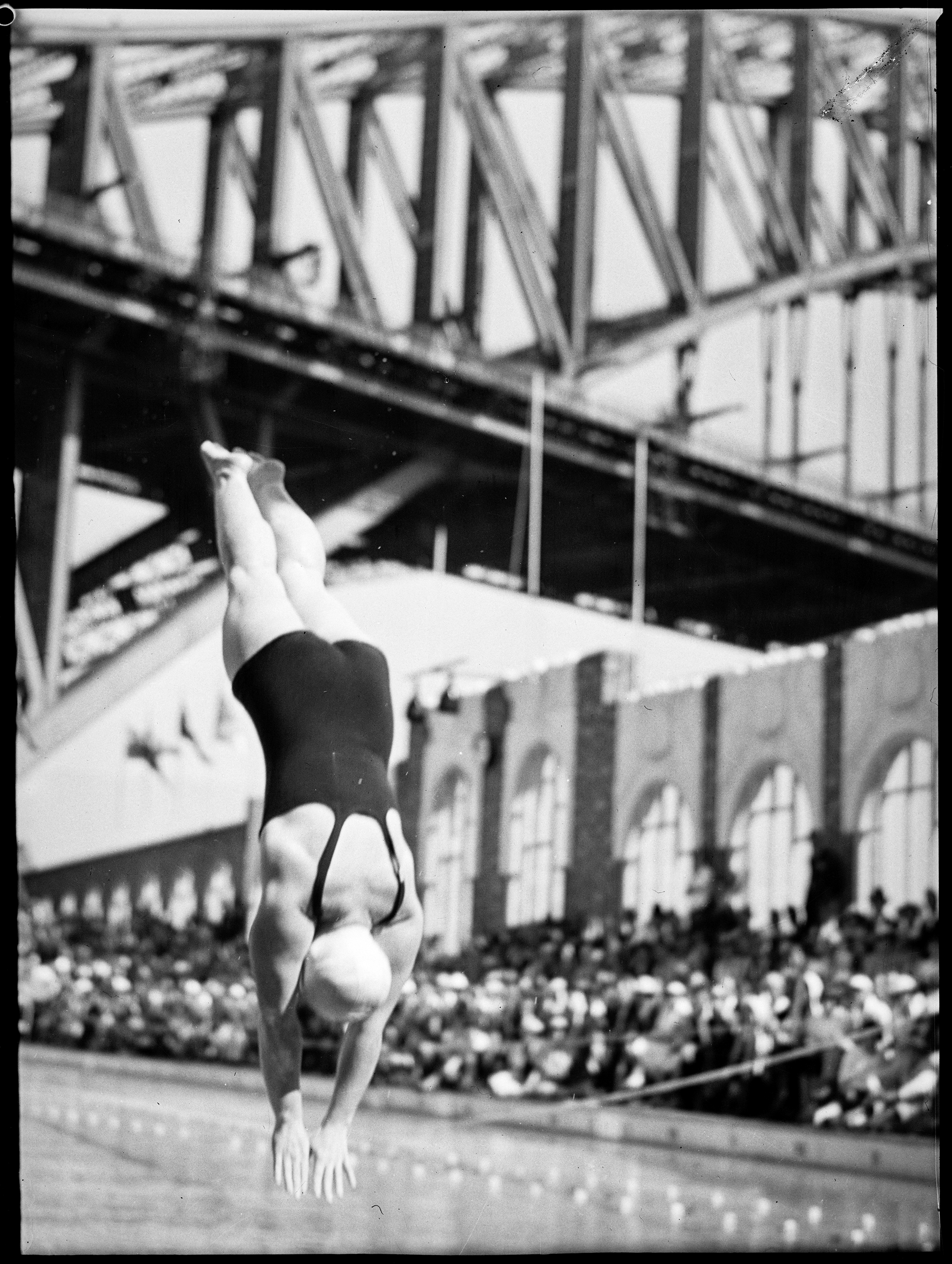
Diving event during the 1938 Games

At the 1938 British Empire Games in Sydney, Australia, there were two aquatics disciplines – swimming and diving. There were four diving events contested and 13 swimming events.

The events were held at the North Sydney Olympic Pool, which was built two years earlier.

Australia and England both won seven gold medals and three silver medals but Australia topped the aquatics medal table by virtue of winning six bronze medal to Englands's three.

== Medal table ==
* Host nation (Australia)

Medals won by nation with totals, ranked by number of golds—sortable
Rank	Nation	Gold	Silver	Bronze	Total
1	Australia (AUS)*	7	3	6	16
2	England (ENG)	7	3	3	13
3	Canada (CAN)	3	6	6	15
4	South Africa (SAF)	0	3	0	3
5	British Guiana (BGU)	0	1	0	1
5	Wales (WAL)	0	1	0	1
7	New Zealand (NZL)	0	0	1	1
7	Scotland (SCO)	0	0	1	1
Totals (8 entries)		17	17	17	51

== Medal summary ==
=== Diving ===
==== Men's events ====
Event	Gold		Silver		Bronze	
3 m springboard	(Australia) Ron Masters	126.36	(England) Doug Tomalin	124.78	(Canada) George Athans	117.90
10 m platform	(England) Doug Tomalin	108.74	(Australia) Ron Masters	102.87	(Canada) George Athans	98.93

==== Women's events ====
Event	Gold		Silver		Bronze	
3 m springboard	(Australia) Irene Donnett	91.18	(Canada) Lynda Adams	88.27	(Canada) Marie Sharkey	81.66
10 m platform	(Australia) Lurline Hook	36.47	(Canada) Lynda Adams	36.39	(Australia) Irene Donnett	34.57

=== Swimming ===
==== Men's events ====
Event	Gold		Silver		Bronze	
110 yd freestyle	(Canada) Bob Pirie	59.6	(South Africa) Terry Collard	60.8	(Australia) William Fleming	61.0
440 yd freestyle	(Canada) Bob Pirie	4:54.6	(England) Bob Leivers	4:55.4	(Australia) Robin Biddulph	4:55.5
1650 yd freestyle	(England) Bob Leivers	19:46.4	(Canada) Bob Pirie	19:59.2	(England) Norman Wainwright	20:17.4
110 yd backstroke	(Australia) Percy Oliver	1:07.9	(Canada) Gordon Kerr	1:09.0	(England) Micky Taylor	1:09.3
220 yd breaststroke	(England) John Davies	2:51.9	(British Guiana) Walter Spence	3:00.5	(Canada) Jimmy Prentice	3:00.8
4×220 yd freestyle relay	England; Frederick Dove; Mostyn Ffrench-Williams; Norman Wainwright; Bob Leivers	9:19.0	Canada; George Burleigh; Gordon Devlin; Robert Hooper; Bob Pirie	9:20.2	Australia; Robert Wilshire; Noel Ryan; Robin Biddulph; William Fleming	9:32.9
3×110 yd medley relay	England; Frederick Dove; John Davies; Micky Taylor	3:28.2	Canada; Gordon Kerr; Jimmy Prentice; Bob Pirie	3:30.5	Australia; Ernest Hobbs; Percy Oliver; William Fleming	3:31.8

==== Women's events ====
Event	Gold		Silver		Bronze	
110 yd freestyle	(Australia) Evelyn de Lacy	1:10.1	(Australia) Dorothy Green	1:11.1	(Canada) Dorothy Lyon	1:12.1
440 yd freestyle	(Australia) Dorothy Green	5:39.7	(England) Margaret Jeffery	5:40.2	(New Zealand) Mona Leydon	5:42.0
110 yd backstroke	(Australia) Pat Norton	1:19.5	(Wales) Jeanne Greenland	1:22.5	(Scotland) Margot Hamilton	1:23.2
220 yd breaststroke	(England) Doris Storey	3:06.3	(South Africa) Carla Gerke	3:12.1	(Canada) Joan Langdon	3:22.2
4×110 yd freestyle relay	Canada; Noel Oxenbury; Dorothy Lyon; Mary Baggaley; Phyllis Dewar	4:48.3	Australia; Dorothy Green; Evelyn de Lacy; Margaret Rawson; Pat Norton	4:49.0	England; Edna Hughes; Joyce Harrowby; Margery Hinton; Zilpha Grant	4:50.1
3×110 yd medley relay	England; Doris Storey; Lorna Frampton; Margery Hinton	3:57.7	South Africa; Carla Gerke; Hazel Holmes; Molly Ryde	4:07.5	Australia; Evelyn de Lacy; Pat Norton; Valerie George	4:10.0

== Finals ==
Men

=== 3 m springboard ===
Pos	Athlete	Pts
1	(Australia) Ron Masters	126.36
2	(England) Doug Tomalin	124.78
3	(Canada) George Athans	117.90
4	(Australia) George Johnston	111.39
5	(Australia) David Norris	110.62

=== 10 m platform ===
Pos	Athlete	Pts
1	(England) Doug Tomalin	108.74
2	(Australia) Ron Masters	102.87
3	(Canada) George Athans	98.93
4	(Australia) Arthur O'Connor	97.39
5	(Australia) Ray Davis	94.21

=== 110 yd freestyle ===
Pos	Athlete	Time
1	(Canada) Bob Pirie	59.6
2	(South Africa) Terry Collard	1:00.8
3	(Australia) William Fleming	1:01.0
4	(British Guiana) Walter Spence	1:01.2
5	(New Zealand) Peter Hanan	1:01.?
6	(England) Frederick Dove	1:01.?
7	(Australia) J. Robert Wilshire	1:01.6

=== 440 yd freestyle ===
Pos	Athlete	Time
1	(Canada) Bob Pirie	4:54.6
2	(England) Bob Leivers	4:55.4
3	(Australia) Robin Biddulph	4:55.5
4	(England) Norman Wainwright	4:58.0
?	(Canada) Robert Hooper	?
?	(Canada) Gordon Devlin	?
7	(Australia) Noel Ryan	5:20.4

=== 1650 yd freestyle ===
Pos	Athlete	Time
1	(England) Bob Leivers	19:46.4
2	(Canada) Bob Pirie	19:59.2
3	(England) Norman Wainwright	20:17.4
4	(Canada) Gordon Devlin	20:38.5
5	(Australia) Robin Biddulph	20:42.2
6	(Australia) Noel Ryan	21:08.2
7	(Canada) Robert Hooper	?

=== 110 yd backstroke ===
Pos	Athlete	Time
1	(Australia) Percy Oliver	1:07.9
2	(Canada) Gordon Kerr	1:09.0
3	(England) Micky Taylor	1:09.3
4	(Canada) Jean M. Demers	1:14.2
5	(England) Mostyn French-Williams	?
6	(Scotland) Willie Francis	?
7	(Wales) Graham Huxtable	?

=== 220 yd breaststroke ===
Pos	Athlete	Time
1	(England) John Davies	2:51.9
2	(British Guiana) Walter Spence	3:00.5
3	(Canada) Jimmy Prentice	3:00.8
4	(Australia) Ray Cameron	3:03.3
5	(Australia) John Johnson	3:03.6
6	(Bermuda) Percy Belvin	3:03.6
7	(Australia) Ernest A. Hobbs	3:09.0

=== 4×220 yd freestyle relay ===
Pos	Athlete	Time
1	(England) Frederick Dove, Mostyn Ffrench-Williams, Norman Wainwright, Bob Leivers	9:19.0
2	(Canada) George Burleigh, Gordon Devlin, Robert Hooper, Bob Pirie	9:20.2
3	(Australia) Robert Wilshire, Noel Ryan, Robin Biddulph, William Fleming	9:32.9

=== 3×110 yd medley relay ===
Pos	Athlete	Time
1	(England) Frederick Dove, John Davies, Micky Taylor	3:28.2
2	(Canada) Gordon Kerr, Jimmy Prentice, Bob Pirie	3:30.5
3	(Australia) Ernest Hobbs, Percy Oliver, William Fleming	3:31.8

Women

=== 3 m springboard ===
Pos	Athlete	Pts
1	(Australia) Irene Donnett	91.18
2	(Canada) Lynda Adams	88.27
3	(Canada) Marie Sharkey	81.66
4	(Australia) Laurie Hawe	75.32
5	(Canada) Barbara Richards	69.18
6	(New Zealand) Gwen Rix	65.86
7	(Australia) Janet Weidenhofer	47.40

=== 10 m platform ===
Pos	Athlete	Pts
1	(Australia) Lurline Hook	36.47
2	(Canada) Lynda Adams	36.39
3	(Australia) Irene Donnett	34.57
4	(England) Jean Gilbert	33.90
5	(Australia) Pamela Hunt	26.10

=== 110 yd freestyle ===
Pos	Athlete	Time
1	(Australia) Evelyn de Lacy	1:10.1
2	(Australia) Dorothy Green	1:11.1
3	(Canada) Dorothy Lyon	1:12.1
4	(Canada) Phyllis Dewar	1:12.2
5	(England) Edna Hughes	?
6	(South Africa) Mollie Ryde	?
7	(England) Zilpha Grant	?

=== 440 yd freestyle ===
Pos	Athlete	Time
1	(Australia) Dorothy Green	5:39.7
2	(England) Margaret Jeffery	5:40.2
3	(New Zealand) Mona Leydon	5:42.0
4	(Canada) Dorothy Hobson	5:47.0
?	(Canada) Phyllis Dewar	?
6	(Australia) Mynee Steel	5:51.7
?	(South Africa) Mollie Ryde	?

=== 110 yd backstroke ===
Pos	Athlete	Time
1	(Australia) Pat Norton	1:19.5
2	(Wales) Jeanne Greenland	1:22.5
3	(Scotland) Margot Hamilton	1:23.2
4	(Canada) Noel Oxenbury	1.23.2/10
5	(England) Zilpha Grant	?
6	(Canada) Florence Humble	?
7	(England) Lorna Frampton	?

=== 220 yd breaststroke ===
Pos	Athlete	Time
1	(England) Doris Storey	3:06.3
2	(South Africa) Carla Gerke	3:12.1
3	(Canada) Joan Langdon	3:22.2
4	(Australia) Valerie George	3:23.0
5	(Australia) Joan Thomas	3:23.6
6	(Australia) Margaret Dovey	3:32.0
7	(New Zealand) Winnie Dunn	?

=== 4×110 yd freestyle relay ===
Pos	Athlete	Time
1	(Canada) Noel Oxenbury, Dorothy Lyon, Mary Baggaley, Phyllis Dewar	4:48.3
2	(Australia) Dorothy Green, Evelyn de Lacy, Margaret Rawson, Pat Norton	4:49.0
3	(England) Edna Hughes, Joyce Harrowby, Margery Hinton, Zilpha Grant	4:50.1

=== 3×110 yd medley relay ===
Pos	Athlete	Time
1	(England) Doris Storey, Lorna Frampton, Margery Hinton	3:57.7
2	(South Africa) Carla Gerke,Hazel Holmes, Molly Ryde	4:07.5
3	(Australia) Evelyn de Lacy, Pat Norton, Valerie George	4:10.0
4	Canada	4:10.1
5	(New Zealand) Joyce Macdonald, Mona Leydon, Winnie Dunn	4:22.3
