= Great Britain at the 1936 Summer Olympics =

- Flag of the United Kingdom
- IOC code: GBR
- NOC: British Olympic Association

in Berlin
- Competitors: 208 in 17 sports
- Flag bearer: Jack Beresford
- Medals Ranked 10th: Gold 4 Silver 7 Bronze 3 Total 14

Summer Olympics appearances (overview)
- 1896; 1900; 1904; 1908; 1912; 1920; 1924; 1928; 1932; 1936; 1948; 1952; 1956; 1960; 1964; 1968; 1972; 1976; 1980; 1984; 1988; 1992; 1996; 2000; 2004; 2008; 2012; 2016; 2020; 2024; 2028

Other related appearances
- 1906 Intercalated Games

Great Britain, represented by the British Olympic Association (BOA), competed at the 1936 Summer Olympics in Berlin, Germany. 208 competitors, 171 men and 37 women, took part in 91 events in 17 sports. British athletes have competed in every Summer Olympic Games.

== Medallists ==
=== Gold ===
- Miles Bellville, Christopher Boardman, Russell Harmer, Charles Leaf, Leonard Martin — Yachting
- Jack Beresford, Dick Southwood — Double Scull Rowing
- Godfrey Brown, Godfrey Rampling, Freddie Wolff, Bill Roberts — 4 × 400 m Relay Athletics
- Harold Whitlock — 50 km Walk Athletics

=== Silver ===
- Alan Barrett, Martin Bristow, Peter Jackson, John Sturrock — Rowing Fours
- Godfrey Brown — 400m Athletics
- Audrey Brown, Barbara Burke, Eileen Hiscock, Violet Olney — 4 × 100 m Relay
- David Dawnay, Bryan Fowler, Humphrey Guinness, William Hinde — Polo
- Donald Finlay — 110m Hurdles
- Ernest Harper — Marathon
- Dorothy Tyler-Odam — High Jump

=== Bronze ===
- Richard Fanshawe, Edward Howard-Vyse, Alec Scott — Equestrian Team eventing
- Harry Hill, Ernest Johnson, Charles King, Ernest Mills — Track Cycling Team Pursuit
- Peter Scott — O-Jolle Yachting

== Cycling ==
Eleven cyclists, all men, represented Great Britain in 1936.

Individual road race

- Charles Holland
- Jackie Bone
- Bill Messer
- Alick Bevan

Team road race

- Charles Holland
- Jackie Bone
- Bill Messer
- Alick Bevan

Sprint

- Ray Hicks

Time trial

- Ray Hicks

Tandem

- Ernest Chambers
- John Sibbit

Team pursuit

- Harry Hill
- Ernest Johnson
- Charles King
- Ernie Mills

== Diving ==
Men

Athlete	Event	Final	
Athlete	Event	Points	Rank
Frederick Hodges	3 m springboard	102.98	20
Doug Tomalin	10 m platform	94.14	9

Women

Athlete	Event	Final	
Athlete	Event	Points	Rank
Katinka Larsen	3 m springboard	64.00	13
Betty Slade	3 m springboard	69.95	9
Jean Gilbert	10 m platform	30.16	7
Madge Moulton	10 m platform	26.62	18

== Fencing ==
18 fencers, 16 men and 2 women, represented Great Britain in 1936.

Men's foil

- Emrys Lloyd
- Denis Pearce
- David Bartlett

Men's team foil

- Denis Pearce, David Bartlett, Emrys Lloyd, Geoffrey Hett, Christopher Hammersley, Roger Tredgold

Men's épée

- Ian Campbell-Gray
- Charles de Beaumont
- Douglas Dexter

Men's team épée

- Charles de Beaumont, Douglas Dexter, Albert Pelling, Ian Campbell-Gray, Terry Beddard, Bertie Childs

Men's sabre

- Oliver Trinder
- Guy Harry
- Robin Brook

Men's team sabre

- Oliver Trinder, Arthur Pilbrow, Guy Harry, Robin Brook, Roger Tredgold

Women's foil

- Judy Guinness Penn-Hughes
- Betty Carnegy-Arbuthnott

== Gymnastics ==
8 women gymnasts represented Great Britain at the 1936 Summer Olympics.

- Mary Heaton, Mary Kelly, Lilian Ridgewell, Doris Blake, Brenda Crowe, Clarice Hanson, Marion Wharton, Edna Gross

== Modern pentathlon ==
Three male pentathletes represented Great Britain in 1936.

- Jeffrey MacDougall
- Percy Legard
- Archibald Jack

== Rowing ==
Great Britain had 18 rowers participate in five out of seven rowing events in 1936.

Men's single sculls - Unplaced

- Humphrey Warren

Men's double sculls - Gold

- Jack Beresford
- Dick Southwood

Men's coxless pair - Unplaced

- David Burnford
- Thomas Cree

Men's coxless four - Silver

- Alan Barrett
- Martin Bristow
- Peter Jackson
- John Sturrock

Men's eight - Fourth

- Tom Askwith
- Ran Laurie
- John Cherry
- Hugh Mason
- McAllister Lonnon
- Annesley Kingsford
- Desmond Kingsford
- John Couchman
- Noel Duckworth (cox)

== Swimming ==
Men

Ranks given are within the heat.

Athlete	Event	Heat		Semifinal		Final	
Athlete	Event	Time	Rank	Time	Rank	Time	Rank
Frederick Dove	100 m freestyle	1:01.6	3	Did not advance			
Mostyn Ffrench-Williams	100 m freestyle	1:00.7	1 Q	1:01.0	8	Did not advance	
Romund Gabrielsen	100 m freestyle	1:01.2	3	Did not advance			
Bob Leivers	400 m freestyle	4:57.2	1 Q	4:55.7	4 q	5:00.9	7
William Pearson	400 m freestyle	5:12.7	4	Did not advance			
Norman Wainwright	400 m freestyle	5:03.6	3	Did not advance			
Bob Leivers	1500 m freestyle	20.04.4	2 Q	20:10.0	3 Q	19:57.4	6
Norman Wainwright	1500 m freestyle	20:47.6	2 Q	20:14.4	5	Did not advance	
Jack Besford	100 m backstroke	1:12.0	1 Q	1:13.6	7	Did not advance	
Jack Middleton	100 m backstroke	1:15.0	5	Did not advance			
Mostyn Ffrench-Williams; Romund Gabrielsen; Bob Leivers; Norman Wainwright	4 × 200 m freestyle relay	—N/a		9:30.8	3 q	9:21.5	6

Women

Ranks given are within the heat.

Athlete	Event	Heat		Semifinal		Final	
Athlete	Event	Time	Rank	Time	Rank	Time	Rank
Zilpha Grant	100 m freestyle	1:12.1	7	Did not advance			
Margery Hinton	100 m freestyle	1:13.0	6	Did not advance			
Olive Wadham	100 m freestyle	1:11.5	3 Q	1:12.0	6	Did not advance	
Margaret Jeffery	400 m freestyle	6:12.7	2 Q	6:07.2	8	Did not advance	
Gladys Morcom	400 m freestyle	6:00.8	4	Did not advance			
Lorna Frampton	100 m backstroke	1:20.9	3 Q	1:19.6	2 Q	1:20.6	6
Audrey Hancock	100 m backstroke	1:23.6	3 Q	1:21.6	5	Did not advance	
Phyllis Harding	100 m backstroke	1:22.1	3 Q	1:19.8	4 q	1:21.5	7
Margaret Gomm	200 m breaststroke	3:15.7	3 Q	3:15.8	6	Did not advance	
Vera Kingston	200 m breaststroke	3:21.7	6	Did not advance			
Doris Storey	200 m breaststroke	3:10.8	2 Q	3:09.8	3 Q	3:09.7	6
Margaret Jeffery; Zilpha Grant; Edna Hughes; Olive Wadham	4 × 100 m freestyle relay	—N/a		4:47.2	2 Q	4:51.0	6
