= Australia at the 1938 British Empire Games =

- CG code: AUS
- CGA: Australian Commonwealth Games Association

in Sydney, Australia
- Competitors: 158
- Flag bearers: Opening: Edgar 'Dunc' Gray; Closing:
- Officials: 11
- Medals Ranked 1st: Gold 25 Silver 19 Bronze 22 Total 66

British Empire Games appearances
- 1930; 1934; 1938; 1950; 1954; 1958; 1962; 1966; 1970; 1974; 1978; 1982; 1986; 1990; 1994; 1998; 2002; 2006; 2010; 2014; 2018; 2022; 2026; 2030

Australia hosted the 1938 British Empire Games in Sydney, New South Wales and their team was abbreviated AUS. This was their third of 3 Commonwealth Games meets.

== Medalists ==
| Medal | Name | Sport | Event |
|---|---|---|---|
| Gold | Decima Norman | Athletics | Women's 100 yd |
| Gold | Decima Norman | Athletics | Women's 220 yd |
| Gold | Decima Norman | Athletics | Women's Broad Jump |
| Gold | Decima Norman; Jean Coleman; Eileen Wearne | Athletics | Women's 440 yards Medley Relay |
| Gold | Decima Norman; Jean Coleman; Thelma Peake; Joan Woodland | Athletics | 660 yards Medley Relay |
| Gold | Jack Metcalfe | Athletics | Men's Hop, Step, Jump |
| Gold | William Smith | Cycling | Men's Welterweight |
| Gold | Dunc Gray | Cycling | Men's 1000 m Sprint |
| Gold | Robert Porter | Cycling | Men's 1000 m Time Trial |
| Gold | Ron Masters | Diving | Men's Springboard |
| Gold | Irene Donnett | Diving | Women's Springboard |
| Gold | Lurline Hook | Diving | Women's Platform |
| Gold | Herb Turner | Rowing | Men's Single Scull |
| Gold | William Bradley; Cecil Pearce | Rowing | Men's Double Scull |
| Gold | Gordon Freeth; Jack Fisher; William Kerr; Don Fraser; Stewart Elder | Rowing | Men's Coxed Four |
| Gold | Percy Oliver | Swimming | Men's 110 yd Backstroke |
| Gold | Evelyn de Lacy | Swimming | Women's 110 yd Freestyle |
| Gold | Patricia Norton | Swimming | Women's 110 yd Backstroke |
| Gold | Dorothy Green | Swimming | Women's 440 yd Freestyle |
| Gold | Dick Garrard | Wrestling | Men's Lightweight |
| Gold | John Knight | Wrestling | Men's Heavyweight |
| Gold | Eddie Scarf | Wrestling | Men's Light Heavyweight |
| Gold | Roy Purchase | Wrestling | Men's Featherweight |
| Gold | Edward Purcell | Wrestling | Men's Bantamweight |
| Gold | Tom Trevaskis | Wrestling | Men's Welterweight |
| Silver | Keith Pardon | Athletics | Men's Hammer Throw |
| Silver | Leslie Fletcher | Athletics | Men's Pole Vault |
| Silver | Lloyd Miller | Athletics | Men's Hop Step Jump |
| Silver | Robert Heffernan | Athletics | Men's High Jump |
| Silver | John Mumford | Athletics | Men's 100 yd |
| Silver | John Mumford | Athletics | Men's 220 yd |
| Silver | Gerald Backhouse | Athletics | Men's 1 mile |
| Silver | John Park | Athletics | Men's 440 yd Hurdles |
| Silver | Joyce Walker | Athletics | Women's 100 yd |
| Silver | Jean Coleman | Athletics | Women's 220 yd |
| Silver | Isabel Grant | Athletics | Women's 80 m Hurdles |
| Silver | Cecil Overell | Boxing | Men's Light-Heavyweight |
| Silver | Tasman Johnson | Cycling | Men's 1000 m Time Trial |
| Silver | Robert Porter | Cycling | Men's 1000 m Sprint |
| Silver | Ron Masters | Diving | Men's Platform |
| Silver | Percy Hutton; Howard Mildren | Lawn bowls | Men's Pair |
| Silver | William Thomas; Alfred Gregory; Doug Bowden; Frank le Souef; Gordon Yewers; Richard Paramor; Edward Bromley; William Dixon; Ainslie Gould | Rowing | Men's Eight |
| Silver | Dorothy Green | Swimming | Women's 110 yd Freestyle |
| Silver | Evelyn de Lacy; Dorothy Green; Patricia Norton; Margaret Rawson | Swimming | Women's 4×110 yd Freestyle Relay |
| Bronze | Ted Best | Athletics | Men's 100 yd |
| Bronze | Ted Best | Athletics | Men's 220 yd |
| Bronze | Jack Metcalfe | Athletics | Men's Javelin |
| Bronze | Francis Drew | Athletics | Men's Shot Put |
| Bronze | Basil Dickinson | Athletics | Men's Broad Jump |
| Bronze | Basil Dickinson | Athletics | Men's Hop Step Jump |
| Bronze | Douglas Shetliffe | Athletics | Men's High Jump |
| Bronze | Sydney Stenner | Athletics | Men's 120 yd Hurdles |
| Bronze | Alan McDougall | Athletics | Men's 120 yd Hurdles |
| Bronze | Thelma Peake | Athletics | Women's Broad Jump |
| Bronze | Eileen Wearne | Athletics | Women's 220 yd |
| Bronze | Ted Best; Ted Hampson; Alf Watson; Howard Yates | Athletics | Men's 4×110 yd Relay |
| Bronze | Jack Dillon | Boxing | Men's Bantamweight |
| Bronze | Leslie Harley | Boxing | Men's Heavyweight |
| Bronze | Irene Donnett | Diving | Women's Platform |
| Bronze | Jack Low | Rowing | Men's Single Scull |
| Bronze | Tom Kinder; Charlie McNeill; Aubrey Murray; Frank Murray | Rowing | Men's Four |
| Bronze | William Fleming | Swimming | Men's 110 yd Freestyle |
| Bronze | Robin Biddulph | Swimming | Men's 440 yd Freestyle |
| Bronze | Robin Biddulph; William Flemming; Noel Ryan; Robert Wilshire | Swimming | Men's 4×220 yd Freestyle Relay |
| Bronze | William Fleming; Ernest Hobbs; Percy Oliver | Swimming | Men's 3×110 yd Medley Relay |
| Bronze | Evelyn de Lacy; Valerie George; Patricia Norton | Swimming | Women's 3×110 yd Medley Relay |

== 1938 Australian Team & Results ==
=== Athletics (Men) ===
Javelin Throw

- John Patrick 'Jack' Metcalfe – 3rd, 182 ft 2 1/4in
- James Barlow – 5th, 169 ft 0 1/4in
- Goode, David P – 6th, 165 ft 1 in
- Sheiles, Bert – 7th, 163 ft 10 1/4in

Discus Throw

- Harold B Wilson – 4th, 133 ft 2 3/
- Keith W Pardon – 5th, 130 ft 4 1/4in
- William R MacKenzie – 6th, 128 ft 11 1/2in
- Button, Adrian – 7th, 125 ft 8 1/2in

Shot Put

- Drew, Francis – 3rd, 45 ft 3 3/8in
- William C Plummer – 4th, 44 ft 5 5/8in
- Harold B Wilson – 5th, 43 ft 3 5/8in
- William R MacKenzie – 6th, 42 ft 1 3/4in

Hammer Throw

- Keith W Pardon – 2nd, 148 ft 1 1/4in
- McNamara, Patrick – 4th, 139 ft 9 1/8in
- Rosenblum, Myer E – 5th, 135 ft 9 1/4in
- Graham, Leslie – 6th, 131 ft 5 1/4in

Pole Vault

- Fletcher, Leslie A – 2nd, 13 ft 0 1/4in
- Winter, Edwin J – 5th, 12 ft 9 in
- Frederick Irvine Woodhouse – 7th, 12 ft 4 1/2in
- Cartwright, William – 8th, 11 ft 6 in

Long Jump

- Raymond G Graf – 7th, 22 ft 6 in

Broad Jump

- Basil C Dickenson – 3rd, 23 ft 5 1/2in
- Gould, Henry 'Harry' T – 4th, 23 ft 4 1/2in
- John Patrick 'Jack' Metcalfe – 5th, 23 ft 2 3/4in

Hop, Step, Jump

- John Patrick 'Jack' Metcalfe – 1st, 50 ft 10 in
- Miller, D Lloyd – 2nd, 50 ft 6 3/4in
- Basil C Dickenson – 3rd, 50 ft 1 3/4in
- Raymond G Graf – 4th, 47 ft 11 5/8in

High Jump

- Heffernan, Robert – 2nd, 6 ft 2 in
- Shetliffe, Douglas F – 3rd, 6 ft 2 in
- Tancred, Peter L – 4th, 6 ft 1 1/4in 4in
- John Patrick 'Jack' Metcalfe – 7th, 5 ft 11 3/4in

100 yards

- John Mumford – 2nd, 9.8 sec (heat 10.0, semi 10.1)
- Edward W Best – 3rd, 9.9 sec (heat 10.0, semi 10.0)
- T Edward Hampson – 5th, 10.0 sec (heat 10.1, semi 10.1)
- Howard Spencer Yates – 6th, 10.1 sec (heat 10.1, semi 10.2)

220 yards

- John Mumford – 2nd, 21.3 sec (heat 21.6, semi 21.6)
- Edward W Best – 3rd, 21.4 sec (heat 21.6, semi 21.4)
- T Edward Hampson – 4th, 21.6 sec (semi) (heat 22.1)
- Howard Spencer Yates – 5th, 21.7 sec (heat 22.0, semi 21.4)

440 yards

- Athol H Jones – 3rd, 49.8 sec (heat)
- John Mumford – 4th, 48.3 (heat)
- Hugh Johnson – 4th (heat)
- Scott, Francis – 4th (heat)

880 yards

- Maxwell Fleming – 6th (heat)
- Goff, Leslie – 6th (heat)
- Gerald I Backhouse – 7th, 1:55.1 (heat)
- Chappel, Roy – 7th (heat)

1-mile

- Gerald I Backhouse – 2nd, 4:12.2 (heat 4:18.0)
- Maxwell Fleming – 5th (heat)
- Frederick Barry-Brown – 6th (heat)
- Bonham, Donald – 7th (heat)

3 miles

- Nicholls, Stanley E – 5th, 14:30.0
- Colman, Frederick – Did not finish
- Faulkner, Keith – Did not finish
- Weightman, Walter – Did not finish

6 miles

- Fred Bassed – 8th
- Millington, Stanley – 9th
- Doyle, Brendan – 10th

120 yards Hurdles

- Stenner, Sydney G – 3rd, 14.4 sec (heat 14.5)
- McLardy, Donald F – 4th, 14.6 sec (heat 14.9)
- Wilson, George – 4th, 15.1 sec (heat)
- Popplewell, Frederick – 4th (heat)

440 yards Hurdles

- John F Park – 2nd, 54.6 sec
- McDougall, Alan – 3rd, 55.2 sec
- Alfred J Watson – 4th
- Magee, Paul F – 6th

4×110 yards Relay

- Edward W Best – 3rd, 41.9 sec
- T Edward Hampson – 3rd, 41.9 sec
- Alfred J Watson – 3rd, 41.9 sec
- Howard Spencer Yates – 3rd, 41.9 sec

4×440 yards Relay

- Athol H Jones – 4th
- Hugh Johnson – 4th
- John F Park – 4th
- Wallace, Vernon – 4th
- Lewis, Maurice – Did not compete (reserve)

Marathon

- Crossley, Richard J – 8th, 3:12:50.0
- Wood, John – 9th, 3:19:47.0
- Hayes, Alfred – Did not finish
- Jolly, Ernest – Did not finish
- Liddle, William – Did not finish
- Patterson, James – Did not finish

=== Athletics (Women) ===
High Jump

- Carter, Doris – 5th, 5 ft 1 in
- Poore, Elsie – 6th, 4 ft 8 in

Broad Jump

- Decima Norman – 1st, 19 ft 1/4in (GR)
- Thelma Peake – 3rd, 18 ft 2 5/8in
- Evans, Enid – 10th 15 ft 10 1/4in
- Nell Gould – 12th 14 ft 9 1/2in

Javelin Throw

- Jones, Elsie – 5th, 101 ft 8 in
- Mitchell, Lena – 6th, 100 ft 3 in
- Clarice Kennedy – 7th, 97 ft 3 3/4in

100 yards

- Decima Norman – 1st, 11.1 sec (GR)
- Walker, Joyce – 2nd, 11.3 sec (heat 11.4, semi 11.4)
- Joan Woodland – 5th, 11.5 sec (heat 11.5, semi 11.2)
- Thelma Peake – (semi) Disqualified (heat 11.5)

220 yards

- Decima Norman – 1st, 24.7 sec (heat 24.9, semi 24.5 (GR))
- Jean Coleman – 2nd, 25.1 sec (heat 25.3, semi 25.2)
- A Eileen Wearne – 3rd, 25.3 sec (heat 25.1, semi 25.2)
- Talbot, Irene – 6th (heat 25.7, semi 25.4)

440 yards Medley Relay

- Jean Coleman – 1st, 49.1 sec
- Decima Norman – 1st, 49.1 sec
- A Eileen Wearne – 1st, 49.1 sec

660 yards Medley Relay

- Jean Coleman – 1st, 1:15.2
- Decima Norman – 1st, 1:15.2
- Thelma Peake – 1st, 1:15.2
- Joan Woodland – 1st, 1:15.2

80 m Hurdles

- Grant, Isabel – 2nd, 11.7 sec (heat 12.1)
- Clarice Kennedy – 4th (heat 12.2)
- Thelma Peake – 5th (heat 12.4)
- Nell Gould – 4th (heat)

=== Bowls ===
Singles

- Jack Low – 3rd

Pairs

- Percy Hutton – 2nd
- Howard Mildren – 2nd

Fours

- Tom Kinder – 3rd
- Charlie H McNeill – 3rd
- Aubrey Murray – 3rd
- H Frank Murray – 3rd

=== Boxing ===
- Trevor Law – Flyweight (up to 51 kg) – Eliminated
- Jack B Dillon – Bantamweight (up to 54 kg) – 3rd
- Leonard Schluter – Featherweight (up to 57 kg) – Eliminated
- Ian Ellis – Lightweight (up to 60 kg) – Eliminated
- William Smith – Welterweight (up to 67 kg) – 1st
- Athol Stubbs – Middleweight (up to 75 kg) – Eliminated
- Leslie Harley – Heavyweight (up to 91 kg) – 3rd
- Cecil G Overell – Light-Heavyweight (up to 81 kg) – 2nd

=== Cycling ===
10 miles

- Fred Ashby – 4th
- John Molloy – unplaced
- Charlie E Wright – unplaced
- Sh. Janki Das – first Indian cyclist

100 km Road Race

- Fred Hines – 6th
- Harold Clayton – unplaced
- Alick Yuille – unplaced

1,000 m Sprint

- Edgar Laurence 'Dunc' Gray – 1st, 13.6 sec
- Robert Porter – 2nd
- Tasman Johnson – unplaced

1,000 m Time Trial

- Robert Porter – 1st, 1:15.2 (GR)
- Tasman Johnson – 2nd, 1:15.7
- Edgar Laurence 'Dunc' Gray – 5th, 1:16.5

=== Rowing ===
Eight

- William G Thomas (bow), 2nd
- Alfred J Gregory (stroke) – 2nd
- Doug K Bowden (cox) – 2nd
- Frank A W le Souef (2) – 2nd
- Gordon H Yewers (3) – 2nd
- Richard L Paramor (4) – 2nd
- Edward R Bromley (5) – 2nd
- William G Dixon (6) – 2nd
- Ainslie B 'Joe' Gould (7) – 2nd
- John Chester (reserve) – Did not compete
- R B Scott (reserve) – Did not compete

Single Scull

- Herbert J Turner – 1st, 8:24.0 (won by 5 lengths)

Double Scull

- William F Bradley (bow) – 1st, 7:29.4
- Cecil A Pearce (stroke) – 1st, 7:29.4

Coxed Four

- Gordon Freeth (bow) – 1st, 7:16.8
- Jack T Fisher (stroke) – 1st, 7:16.8
- H F Kerr (cox) – 1st, 7:16.8
- Don H Fraser (2) – 1st, 7:16.8
- Stewart J Elder (3) – 1st, 7:16.8
- Max Gaskin (reserve)
- John Edward Suffren (reserve)

=== Swimming (Men) ===
110 yd Freestyle

- William Fleming – 3rd, 1:01.0 (heat 1:01.8)
- Percy Charles Oliver – 6th, 1:03.1 (heat)
- J Robert Wilshire – 7th, 1:01.6 (heat 1:01.4)

440 yd Freestyle

- H Robin Biddulph – 3rd, 4:55.4 (heat 5:01.5)
- Robert Newbiggen – 5th, 5:19.8 (heat)
- Noel Phillip Ryan – 7th, 5:20.4 (heat 5:19.0)

1,650 yd Freestyle

- H Robin Biddulph – 5th, 20:42.2 (heat 21:07.2)
- Noel Phillip Ryan – 6th, 21:08.2 (heat 21:06.6)
- Robert Newbiggen – Did not finish

4×220 yd Freestyle Relay

- H Robin Biddulph – 3rd, 9:32.9 (split 2:18.8)
- William Fleming – 3rd, 9:32.9 (split 2:26.8)
- Noel Phillip Ryan – 3rd, 9:32.9 (split 2:24.6)
- J Robert Wilshire – 3rd, 9:32.9 (split 2:27.7)

3×110 yd Medley Relay

- William Fleming – 3rd, 3:31.8 (split 1:01.6)
- Ernest A Hobbs – 3rd, 3:31.8 (split 1:20.7)
- Percy Charles Oliver – 3rd, 3:31.8 (split 1:09.5)

220 yd Breaststroke

- Ray Cameron – 4th, 3:03.1 (heat 3:07.2)
- Ernest A Hobbs – 7th, 3:09.0 (heat 3:04.9)
- John Johnson – 5th, 3:03.6 (heat 3:07.8)

110 yd Backstroke

- Percy Charles Oliver – 1st, 1:07.9 (GR) (heat 1:09.6)
- Reginald Vaughan Clark – 4th, 1:18.3 (heat)
- Roth Bassingthwaite – 5th, 1:15.1 (heat)

=== Swimming (Women) ===
110 yd Freestyle

- Evelyn de Lacy – 1st, 1:10.1 (GR) (heat 1:10.6)
- Dorothy J Green – 2nd, 1:11.1 (heat 1:11.4)
- Margaret Rawson – 5th, 1:15.8 (heat)

110 yd Backstroke

- Gwen Millard – 4th, 1:27.5 (heat)
- Marion Nixon – 5th, 1:26.5 (heat)
- Patricia Norton – 1st, 1.19.5 (heat 1:20.6)

220 yd Breaststroke

- Margaret Dovey – 6th, 3:32.0
- Valerie George – 4th, 3:23.0
- Joan Thomas – 5th, 3:23.6

440 yd Freestyle

- Dorothy J Green – 1st, 5:39.9 (GR) (heat 5:43.0)
- Evelyn de Lacy – 5th, 5:59.4 (heat)
- Mynee Steel – 6th, 5:51.7 (heat 5:53.2)

4×110 yd Freestyle Relay

- Evelyn de Lacy – 2nd, 4:49.9
- Dorothy J Green – 2nd, 4:49.9
- Patricia Norton – 2nd, 4:49.9
- Margaret Rawson – 2nd, 4:49.9

3×110 yd Medley Relay

- Evelyn de Lacy – 3rd, 4:10.0 (split 1:12.9)
- Valerie George – 3rd, 4:10.0 (split 1:12.0)
- Patricia Norton – 3rd, 4:10.0 (split 1:20.1)

=== Diving (Men) ===
Springboard

- George Johnston – 4th, 111.39 points
- Ronald Masters – 1st, 126.36 points
- David J Norris – 5th, 110.62 points

Platform

- Ray Davis – 5th, 94.21 points
- Ronald Masters – 2nd, 102.87 points
- Arthur O'Connor – 4th, 97.39 points

=== Diving (Women) ===
Springboard

- Irene Donnett – 1st, 91.18 points
- Laurie Hawe – 4th, 75.32 points
- Janet Weidenhofer – 7th, 47.40 points

Platform

- Irene Donnett – 3rd, 34.57 points
- Lurline Hook – 1st, 36.47 points
- Pamela Hunt – 5th, 26.10 points

=== Wrestling ===
- Richard Edward 'Dick' Garrard – Lightweight (up to 68 kg) – 1st
- Todd Hardwick – Middleweight (up to 82 kg) – 5th
- John Lambert 'Jack' Knight – Heavyweight (up to 100 kg) – 1st
- Edward Purcell – Bantamweight (up to 57 kg) – 1st
- Roy Purchase – Featherweight (up to 62 kg) – 1st
- Eddie Richard Scarf – Light Heavyweight (up to 90 kg) – 1st
- Tom Trevaskis – Welterweight (up to 74 kg) – 1st

== Officials ==
- Honorary Team Manager – Wilfred Selwyn Kent Hughes (VIC)
- Athletics Manager – Wilfred Ernest Painter (VIC)
- Athletics Manageress – Mrs Doris Magee (NSW)
- Boxing & Wrestling Manager – Edgar Stephen Tanner (VIC)
- Cycling Manager – C J 'Mick' Gray (VIC)
- Rowing Manager – John Rook (NSW)
- Rowing Coach – T K 'Toff' Qurban (SA)
- Rowing Eights Coach – Sidney Raper (NSW)
- Swimming Manager – Jack P Sheedy (WA)
- Swimming Manageress – Katie Buckle (NSW)

== See also ==
- Australia at the 1936 Summer Olympics
