= Jeanne Greenland =

Welsh swimmer

Jeanne Patricia Greenland
Personal information
- Born: 26 January 1919 Newport, Wales
- Died: 19 December 2001 (aged 82) Vancouver, Canada

Sport
- Sport: Swimming
- Strokes: backstroke
- Club: Newport S.C.
Medal record
Women's swimming
Representing Wales
British Empire Games
Silver medal – second place	1938 Sydney	110 yd backstroke

Jeanne Patricia Greenland (26 January 1919 – 19 December 2001) was a Welsh competitive swimmer, who specialised in backstroke. She represented Wales at the British Empire Games (now Commonwealth Games), winning a silver medal.

== Biography ==
Greenland was born in Newport, Wales, educated at Newport Girls' High and studied at the University of Oxford.

Jeanne represented Wales in 1934 British Empire Games in the 440yd Relay.

She also represented the Welsh team and won a silver medal behind Australian Pat Norton in the 110 yards backstroke at the 1938 British Empire Games in Sydney, Australia.

At the time of the 1938 Games, she was a student and living at 22 Oldfield Road in Newport.

Jeanne qualified for the 1940 Olympic swim team but was unable to compete as the Olympics were cancelled due to WWII

She was the first woman from Wales to go to Oxford where she was recruited by her math professor to work at Bletchley Park where she aided the code breakers during WWII. She kept this secret for 50 years.

Jeanne married RAF Squadron Leader Harry Emlyn Bufton. They lived in Wales, England, Bahrain, Washington DC, eventually settling in Vancouver, Canada in 1965. They had 3 children.

== See also ==
- List of Commonwealth Games medallists in swimming (women)
- List of women in Bletchley Park
- Wales at the 1934 British Empire Games
