= Shelagh Browning =

Welsh swimmer

Personal information
- Born: 24 October 1917 Stroud, England
- Died: July 1976 (aged 59) Glamorgan, Wales

Sport
- Sport: Swimming
- Strokes: freestyle
- Club: Newport S.C.

Shelagh Leslie Browning (24 October 1917 – July 1976) was a Welsh competitive swimmer, who specialised in long-distance freestyle swimming. She represented Wales at the British Empire Games (now Commonwealth Games).

== Biography ==
Browning was born in Stroud, England but swam for the Newport Swimming Club in Wales. In 1936 she was the three-times holder of the Welsh long distance championships (known as the Taff Swim).

She also won the English long-distance championship for three successive years from 1934 to 1936, aged 17 at the time of her first win. Her success at multiple championships had already propelled her to fame at the age of 19.

In 1937, she set a target of reaching the Empire Games. However, her speciality was one mile and further and the longest race at the Games for women was 440 yards. She subsequently represented the Welsh team in the 440 yards freestyle event at the 1938 British Empire Games in Sydney, Australia but failed to reach the final due to the short distance for her. At the time of the Games, she was employed in a drawing office in Newport as an Electrical Engineer Tracer (somebody who copied engineers drawings) and lived at St Woolos Lodge, 103 Stow Hill in Newport.

After the Games she moved to Yeovil and joined a drawing office there.

World War II effectively ended her career and in December 1940, Browning married Welsh Olympian Leslie Palmer.

== See also ==
- List of Commonwealth Games medallists in swimming (women)
