= Kenneth Deane (swimmer) =

British swimmer

Personal information
- Nationality: British (English)
- Born: 23 August 1921 Rochford, Essex, England
- Died: First quarter 1997 Henley-on-Thames, England

Sport
- Sport: Swimming
- Event: freestyle
- Club: Great Yarmouth SC

Kenneth Robert Hamilton Deane (23 August 1921 – 1997) was a male swimmer who competed for England.

== Swimming career ==
Deane was educated at Great Yamouth Grammar School and was a member of the Great Yarmouth Swimming Club. He was a full England international at the age of 15.

Deane represented the England team at the 1938 British Empire Games in Sydney, Australia, where he competed in the 440 yards freestyle event.

== Personal life ==
During the Games in 1938 he lived at Surbiton Lodge, High Street, Gorleston-on-Sea, Norfolk and was a student. His training schedule during the winter included a daily 100 mile round trip because the nearest swimming pool was in Ipswich, the Norwich pool was only open during the summer months.
