= Leslie Palmer =

Leslie or Les Palmer may refer to:

- Leslie Palmer (water polo) (1910–1997), British water polo player
- Leslie "Teacher" Palmer (born 1943), Trinidadian community activist, writer and teacher
- Les Palmer (American football) (1923–2006), American football defensive back
- Les Palmer (footballer) (1923–2002), English footballer
- Les Palmer (Home and Away)
