= Goldup Davies =

British swimmer (1914–1989)

Personal information
- Full name: John Goldup Davies
- Nationality: British (English)
- Born: 8 January 1914 Bermondsey, England
- Died: 11 August 1989 (aged 75) Wellington, New Zealand

Sport
- Sport: Swimming
- Strokes: Breaststroke
- Club: Laurie SC
Medal record
Swimming
Representing England
Commonwealth Games
Gold medal – first place	1938 Sydney	220y breaststroke
Gold medal – first place	1938 Sydney	330y medley relay

John Goldup Davies (8 January 1914 – 11 August 1989) was a British swimmer.

== Biography ==
Davies competed in the men's 200 metre breaststroke at the 1948 Summer Olympics.

He represented England and won double gold in the 220 yards Breaststroke and 330 yards medley relay, at the 1938 British Empire Games in Sydney, Australia. At the ASA National British Championships he won the 220 yards breaststroke title in 1946.

Davies married athlete Ethel Raby in late 1939. Raby also competed at the same 1938 British Empire Games and was a multiple national long jump champion.

He died in Wellington, was cremated, and was buried at Mākara Cemetery.
