= Harry Lister =

Male english athlete (1915-2006)

Harry Kennith Lister
Personal information
- Nationality: British (English)
- Born: 6 November 1915 Whitby District, England
- Died: 2006 (aged 90) Lincolnshire, England

Sport
- Club: Salford Harriers

Harry Kenneth Lister (6 November 1915 – 2006) was a male athlete who competed for England who competed at the 1938 British Empire Games.

== Biography ==
Lister represented England in the long jump at the 1938 British Empire Games held in Sydney, Australia. At the time of the Games he was a school teacher by trade and lived at Bromley Wood Lane, in Scunthorpe.

Lister finished third behind William Breach in the long jump event at the 1939 AAA Championships before his career was interrupted by World War II.
