= Graham Huxtable =

Welsh swimmer

Personal information
- Born: 17 July 1916 Gower, Glamorgan, Wales
- Died: 2004 (aged 87–88) Swansea, Wales

Sport
- Sport: Swimming
- Strokes: backstroke
- Club: Swansea SC

Strefford Graham Huxtable (17 July 1916 – 2004) was a Welsh competitive swimmer, who specialised in backstroke. He represented Wales at two British Empire Games (now Commonwealth Games).

== Biography ==
Huxtable was educated at Swansea Grammar School and was a member of the Swansea Swimming Club and was the backstroke champion of Wales in 1934, setting a Welsh record of 1 min 14.1/5sec.

He won the Welsh backstroke qualifying event for the 1934 Empire Games but failed to reach the finals of the freestyle and backstroke events at the Games.

In 1937, he won the Taff Swim held in Roath Park Lake. He also represented the Welsh team and reached the final of the 110 yards backstroke at the 1938 British Empire Games in Sydney, Australia.

At the time of the Games, he was a factory manager for a tin plate manufacturer and living at 16 Myrtle Grove, Glanmor in Swansea. At the 1938 Empire Games he met the English diver Jean Gilbert and the pair would later marry in 1942 in Swansea.

== See also ==
- List of Commonwealth Games medallists in swimming (women)
