= Noel Oxenbury =

Canadian swimmer (1918–2012)

Personal information
- Full name: Noel Gertrude Morrow
- National team: Canada
- Born: Noel Gertrude Oxenbury; December 25, 1918 New Westminster, British Columbia
- Died: January 29, 2012 (aged 93) White Rock, British Columbia

Sport
- Sport: Swimming
- Strokes: Backstroke
Medal record
Women's swimming
Representing Canada
British Empire Games
Gold medal – first place	1938 Sydney	4×110 yd freestyle relay
World Masters Games
Gold medal – first place	2009 Sydney	100m backstroke, M90

Noel Gertrude Morrow (née Oxenbury; December 25, 1918 – January 29, 2012) was a Canadian swimmer who competed at the 1936 Summer Olympics in Berlin in the 100-metre backstroke event, but was eliminated in the first round. Two years later she competed at the 1938 British Empire Games in Sydney and won a gold medal in the 4×110-yard freestyle relay alongside Phyllis Dewar, Dorothy Lyon and Mary Baggaley. She also placed fourth in the 3×110-yard medley relay with Baggaley and Joan Langdon and competed in the 110 yd backstroke. She was born in New Westminster, British Columbia. Since 2004 she has competed in backstroke events at Canadian Masters Championships and won a gold medal in the 100m backstroke event in the 90-94 age classification. On October 4, 2003, she was inducted as a member of the Swim B.C. Hall of Fame.
