= Wales at the 1938 British Empire Games =

- CG code: WAL
- CGA: Wales at the Commonwealth Games
- Website: teamwales.cymru

in Sydney, Australia
- Medals Ranked 6th: Gold 2 Silver 1 Bronze 0 Total 3

British Empire Games appearances
- 1930; 1934; 1938; 1950; 1954; 1958; 1962; 1966; 1970; 1974; 1978; 1982; 1986; 1990; 1994; 1998; 2002; 2006; 2010; 2014; 2018; 2022; 2026; 2030

Flag of Wales until 1953

Wales at the 1938 British Empire Games (abbreviated WAL) was the third time that the nation had participated at the Games following the appearances in 1930 and 1934.

The Games were held in Sydney, Australia from 5 to 12 February 1938 and Wales came 6th overall in the games with two gold medals and one silver medal.

== Medals ==
=== Gold ===
- Jim Alford, Athletics
- Denis Reardon, Boxing

=== Silver ===
- Jeanne Greenland, Swimming

=== Bronze ===
None

== Team ==
=== Athletics ===
Men

Athlete	Events	Notes	Medals
Jim Alford	880y, 1 mile	Cardiff Amateur Athletic Club	Gold medal

=== Boxing ===
Athlete	Events	Notes	Medals
Denis Reardon	Middleweight	Melingriffith BC, Cardiff	Gold medal

=== Cycling ===
Athlete	Events	Notes	Medals
Reg Braddick	Road Race, 10 mile scratch	Cardiff 100 Miles C.C.	

=== Swimming ===
Men

Athlete	Events	Notes	Medals
Graham Huxtable	110y backstroke, 110y/440y freestyle	Swansea S.C.	

Women

Athlete	Events	Notes	Medals
Shelagh Browning	440y freestyle	Newport S.C.	
Jeanne Greenland	110y backstroke, 110y/440y freestyle	Newport S.C.	Silver medal

== See also ==
- Wales at the Commonwealth Games
