= Michael Henry Taylor =

Swimmer who competed for England

Personal information
- Nationality: British (English)
- Born: 16 August 1918 Ecclesall, Sheffield, England
- Died: December 2005 (aged 87) Salisbury, Wiltshire, England

Sport
- Sport: Swimming
- Event(s): backstroke, freestyle
- Club: Sheffield SC
Medal record
Swimming
Representing England
British Empire Games
Gold medal – first place	1938 Sydney	330 yard medley relay
Bronze medal – third place	1938 Sydney	110 yard backstroke

Michael Henry Taylor (16 August 1918 – December 2005) was a male swimmer who competed for England.

== Biography ==
Taylor represented England at the 1938 British Empire Games and won a gold medal in the 330 yard medley relay and a bronze medal in the 110 yard backstroke at the 1938 British Empire Games in Sydney, New South Wales, Australia.

He swam for Sheffield SC and was the Yorkshire champion in backstroke and freestyle.

== Personal life ==
During the Games in 1938 he lived at Abbey Lane, Sheffield and was a solicitor's clerk by trade.
