= Gordon Kerr (swimmer) =

Canadian swimmer (1917–2009)

Personal information
- Full name: Gordon Maxfield Kerr
- National team: Canada
- Born: October 4, 1917 Brantford, Ontario
- Died: March 31, 2009 (aged 91) Lakefield, Ontario

Sport
- Sport: Swimming
- Strokes: Backstroke
Medal record
Men's swimming
Representing Canada
British Empire Games
Silver medal – second place	1938 Sydney	110 yd backstroke
Silver medal – second place	1938 Sydney	3×110 yd medley

Gordon Maxfield Kerr (October 4, 1917 – March 31, 2009) was a Canadian backstroke swimmer who competed in the 1936 Summer Olympics in Berlin. He advanced to the semi-finals of the 100-metre backstroke, but did not qualify for the final. He finished tenth overall.

At the 1938 British Empire Games in Sydney, he won the silver medal in the 100-yard backstroke competition. He was also a member of the Canadian team which won the silver medal in the 3×110-yard medley relay.

== See also ==
- List of Commonwealth Games medallists in swimming (men)
