= Roy Purchase =

Australian wrestler

Medal record

Featherweight

Representing Australia

British Empire Games
Gold medal – first place	1938 Sydney	

Roy Purchase was an Australian wrestler who represented Australia in the 1938 British Empire Games.

== Career ==
Purchase was born in New South Wales and became Australian featherweight champion in 1937.

He won gold in the featherweight (up to 62 kg) wrestling category at the 1938 British Empire Games.

Purchase was set to represent Australia at the 1940 Olympic Games, but the games were cancelled due to the outbreak of World War II. Post-war, he wrestled in the NSW state championships in the lightweight division in 1947, reaching the finals in 1948.
