= Jean Gilbert (diver) =

British diver

Personal information
- Nationality: British (English)
- Born: December 1, 1919 Sheffield, England
- Died: 2002 (aged 82–83) Saint Helier, Jersey

Sport
- Sport: Diving
- Event: Platform
- Club: Jersey Swimming Club

Jean Gilbert (1 December 1919 – 2002) was a female English diver who competed for Great Britain at the 1936 Summer Olympics.

== Biography ==
Gilbert was born in Sheffield, England but moved to Jersey aged 3.

At the 1936 Olympic Games in Berlin, she finished seventh in the 10 metre platform event.

At the 1938 British Empire Games in Sydney, Australia, she represented England and finished fourth in the high diving competition.

At the 1938 Empire Games she met Welsh swimmer Graham Huxtable and the pair would later marry in 1942 in Swansea.
