= Joyce Harrowby =

English swimmer (1921–2016)

Personal information
- Nationality: British (English)
- Born: 10 January 1921 Leicester, England
- Died: 27 December 2016 (aged 95) Brisbane, Australia

Sport
- Sport: Swimming
- Event: freestyle
Medal record
Swimming
Representing England
British Empire Games
Bronze medal – third place	1938 Sydney	440 Yard Freestyle Relay

Joyce Faunce née Harrowby (10 January 1921 - 27 December 2016) was a female swimmer who represented England and won a bronze medal at the British Empire Games (now Commonwealth Games).

== Swimming career ==
In the 1938 British Empire Games in Sydney, Australia, Faunce (then Harrowby) won a bronze medal in the 4×110 yd freestyle relay, as well as competing in the 110-yard freestyle.

She later moved to Australia in 1957 and continued to actively participate in the local swimming communities there, including Noosa Masters Swimming Club, where she served as secretary. By 2016, Faunce had set various national records for her age bracket and won several gold medals in 50-metres freestyle.

== Personal life ==
During the Games in 1938, she lived as a student at York House, Wyvern Avenue, Belgrave in Leicester and later married Arthur Watson in 1944, whom she had three children with. After moving to Australia she remained there with her children until her death in 2016.
