= Australia at the 1930 British Empire Games =

- CGF code: AUS
- CGA: Australian Commonwealth Games Association
- Website: commonwealthgames.org.au

in Hamilton, Ontario, Canada
- Competitors: 7 in 4 sports
- Flag bearers: Opening: Bobby Pearce; Closing:
- Officials: 2
- Medals Ranked 4th: Gold 3 Silver 4 Bronze 1 Total 8

British Empire Games appearances
- 1930; 1934; 1938; 1950; 1954; 1958; 1962; 1966; 1970; 1974; 1978; 1982; 1986; 1990; 1994; 1998; 2002; 2006; 2010; 2014; 2018; 2022; 2026; 2030

Australia at the 1930 British Empire Games was represented by a handful of athletes and abbreviated AUS.

Australia was one of only eleven countries to be represented at these inaugural Games.

At these first Games, Australia won only eight medals against England's 61. The Australians' return home was delayed because the RMS Tahiti on which they were due to travel sank during the Games.

== Medallists ==
Medal	Name	Sport	Event
Gold	Bobby Pearce	Rowing	Men's Singles Sculls
Gold	Noel Ryan	Swimming	Men's 440 yards Freestyle
Gold	Noel Ryan	Swimming	Men's 1500 yards Freestyle
Silver	William Whyte	Athletics	Men's 1 Mile Run
Silver	Alex Hillhouse	Athletics	Men's 2 Mile Steeplechase
Silver	Alex Hillhouse	Athletics	Men's 3 Mile Run
Silver	Dudley Gallagher	Boxing	Men's Middleweight Division (75 kg)
Bronze	George Golding	Athletics	Men's 440 Yard Run/Quarter Mile

== 1930 Australian Team & Results ==
=== Athletics ===
Men's 440 Yard Run/Quarter Mile

- George Augustus Golding – Bronze, 49.6 s (in heat)
- Herbert Alexander Bascombe – 6th, 49.4 s (in heat)

Men's 880 Yard Run/Half Mile

- Herbert Alexander Bascombe – 5th in Heat 1
- George Augustus Golding – Did not finish

Men's 1 Mile Run

- William "Tickle" Miller Whyte – Silver, 4 min 17.0 s
- Russell McDougall – 7th

Men's 2 Mile Steeplechase

- Alex John Hillhouse – Silver

Men's 3 Mile Run

- Alex John Hillhouse – Silver, 14 min 27.6 s

Men's 6 Mile Run

- Alex John Hillhouse – Did not start

Men's 4 x 110 Yard Relay

- Australia – Did not start

=== Boxing ===
Men's Middleweight Division (75 kg)

- Dudley C. Gallagher – Silver

=== Rowing ===
Men's Singles Sculls

- Robert Pearce – Gold

=== Swimming ===
Men's 100 Yards Backstroke

- (Ivan) William Cameron – 4th

Men's 100 Yards Freestyle

- (Ivan) William Cameron – 4th

Men's 1500 Yards Freestyle

- Noel Phillip Ryan – Gold, 18 min 55.4 s

Men's 440 Yards Freestyle

- Noel Phillip Ryan – Gold, 4 min 39.8 s

== Officials ==
- Honorary Manager – Hugh Richard Weir (VIC)
- Honorary Coach-Trainer – Harvey Howard Fargher (VIC)

== See also ==
- Australia at the 1928 Summer Olympics
- Australia at the 1932 Summer Olympics
