= Lorna Frampton =

British swimmer (1920–2009)

Personal information
- Born: 2 April 1920 Hendon, England
- Died: 23 February 2009 (aged 88) Epsom, England

Sport
- Sport: Swimming
- Strokes: Backstroke
- Club: Polytechnic Harriers SC
Medal record
Women's swimming
Representing England
British Empire Games
Gold medal – first place	1938 Sydney	3×110 yd medley

Lorna Frampton (2 April 1920 – 23 February 2009) was an English backstroke swimmer who competed for Great Britain at the 1936 Summer Olympics in Berlin.

== Biography ==
Frampton was born in Hendon and swam for Polytechnic Harriers SC.

At the 1938 Olympic Games she finished sixth in the women's 100-metre backstroke event with a time of 1 minute and 20.6 seconds.

At the 1938 British Empire Games in Sydney, Australia, she was a member of the English women's team that won the gold medal in the 3×110-yard medley relay event.
