= Doug Tomalin =

British diver

Doug Tomalin CBE, DFC, AFC
Personal information
- Nationality: British (English)
- Born: 20 August 1914 St Pancras, London, England
- Died: 19 December 1998 (aged 84) Watford, England
Medal record
Men's diving
Representing England
British Empire Games
Gold medal – first place	1938 Sydney	high diving
Silver medal – second place	1934 London	3 m springboard
Silver medal – second place	1934 London	high diving
Silver medal – second place	1938 Sydney	3 m springboard

Charles Douglas Tomalin, CBE, DFC, AFC (20 August 1914 – 19 December 1998) was an English diver who competed for Great Britain at the 1936 Summer Olympics.

== Biography ==
At the 1936 Olympic Games in Berlin, he finished ninth in the 10 metre platform event.

At the 1934 Empire Games he won the silver medal in the 3 metre springboard event and in the high diving competition. Four years later at the 1938 Sydney Games he won the gold medal in the high diving contest and the silver medal in the 3 metre springboard event.

Subsequently, he became a senior and decorated officer in the Royal Air Force, rising to the rank of air commodore.
