= Bob Leivers =

British swimmer (1914–1964)

Personal information
- Nationality: British (English)
- Born: 27 December 1914 Nottingham, England
- Died: 28 August 1964 (aged 49) Chelsea, London, England

Sport
- Sport: Swimming
- Club: Longton Swimming Club
Medal record
Representing England
Commonwealth Games
Gold medal – first place	1938 Sydney	1500 yd freestyle
Gold medal – first place	1938 Sydney	4×220 yd freestyle
Silver medal – second place	1934 London	4×200 yd freestyle
Silver medal – second place	1938 Sydney	400 yd freestyle
Representing Great Britain
European Championships (LC)
Silver medal – second place	1938 London	1500 m freestyle
Bronze medal – third place	1938 London	4×200 m freestyle

Robert Thomas Hanford Leivers (27 December 1914 – 28 August 1964) was an English freestyle swimmer who competed for Great Britain at the 1932 Summer Olympics and in the 1936 Summer Olympics.

== Biography ==
Leivers was born in Nottingham, England and swam for Longton Swimming Club in Stoke-on-Trent.

In 1932 he finished fifth with the British relay team in the 4×200 metre freestyle relay event. He also participated in the 400 metre freestyle competition was eliminated in the first round.

Four years later he was a member of the British relay team which finished sixth in the 4×200 metre freestyle relay contest. He also finished sixth in the 1500 metre freestyle event and seventh in the 400 metre freestyle competition.

At the British Empire Games in 1934 he won a silver medal as part of the English team in the 2×220 yards relay race. Four years later at the 1938 British Empire Games in Sydney, Australia, he won the 1500 yards contest and finished second in the 400 yards event and as member of the English relay team he won his second gold medal.

During his athletic years he was famous for his friendly rivalry with fellow Potteries swimmer Norman Wainwright; they both trained at Longton Swimming Baths, which have now been demolished.

Bob lived in Stoke-on-Trent, Staffordshire where he ran the family business, Leivers Butchers with shops in Longton, Staffordshire and Meir, Staffordshire. He married Winifred May Leivers (née Degg) and fathered two children; Patricia Ann McLaughlin (née Leivers) and Robert Thomas Hanford Leivers. He died in Chelsea, London.

== See also ==
- List of Commonwealth Games medallists in swimming (men)
