= Australia at the 1934 British Empire Games =

Australia at the 1934 Commonwealth Games
- CG code: AUS
- CGA: Australian Commonwealth Games Association
- Website: commonwealthgames.org.au

in London, England
- Competitors: 17 in 5 sports
- Flag bearers: Opening: Noel Ryan; Closing:
- Officials: 2
- Medals Ranked 3rd: Gold 8 Silver 4 Bronze 2 Total 14

Commonwealth Games appearances (overview)
- 1930; 1934; 1938; 1950; 1954; 1958; 1962; 1966; 1970; 1974; 1978; 1982; 1986; 1990; 1994; 1998; 2002; 2006; 2010; 2014; 2018; 2022; 2026; 2030

Australia participated at the 1934 British Empire Games.

== Medallists ==
Medal	Name	Sport	Event
Gold	Jack Metcalfe	Athletics	Men's Hop, Step, Jump
Gold	Leonard Cook	Boxing	Lightweight
Gold	Dunc Gray	Cycling	Men's Time Trial
Gold	Noel Ryan	Swimming	Men's 440 yd Freestyle
Gold	Noel Ryan	Swimming	1,500 yd Freestyle
Gold	Clare Dennis	Swimming	Women's 200 yd Breaststroke
Gold	Dick Garrard	Wrestling	Men's Lightweight
Gold	John Knight	Wrestling	Men's Heavyweight
Silver	Charles Reilly	Athletics	Men's 440 yards Hurdles
Silver	Horace Pethybridge	Cycling	Men's 1,000 yards Sprint
Silver	Lesley Thompson	Diving	Women's Springboard
Silver	Lesley Thompson	Diving	Women's Platform
Bronze	Fred Woodhouse	Athletics	Men's Pole Vault
Bronze	Jack Metcalfe	Athletics	Men's Broad Jump

== 1934 Australian Team & Results ==
=== Athletics ===
100 yards

- Howard Spencer Yates – 6th (heat 10.1, semi 10.1)
- Jack C Horsfall – 3rd (heat)
- Noel Dempsey – 4th (heat)

220 yards

- Jack C Horsfall -3rd (heat 6)
- Noel Dempsey – 4th, 22.9 (semi)
- Howard Spencer Yates – 5th, 22.4 (semi)

440 yards

- H Wilton Lander – 3rd (heat)

880 yards

- H Wilton Lander – 4th (heat)

440 yards Hurdles

- Charles P Reilly – Silver, 55.5 sec

Hop, Step, Jump

- John Patrick 'Jack' Metcalfe – Gold, 51 ft 31/2 in (GR)

Broad Jump

- John Patrick 'Jack' Metcalfe – Silver, 22 ft 9 in

High Jump

- John Patrick 'Jack' Metcalfe – 4th, 6 ft 2 in

Pole Vault

- Frederick Irvine Woodhouse – Bronze, 12 ft 3 in

4×110 yards Relay

- Noel Dempsey – 4×100 yards Relay – 4th
- Jack C Horsfall – 4×110 yards Relay – 4th
- H Wilton Lander – 4×110 yards Relay – 4th
- Howard Spencer Yates – 4×110 yards Relay – 4th

=== Bowls ===
- E W Walker – singles – 6th
- T M Rainer – pairs – 9th
- J Banks – pairs – 9th
- C Gale – fours/rinks – 9th
- H Langley – fours/rinks – 9th
- William White – fours/rinks – 9th
- Sir Henry Barwell – fours/rinks – 9th

=== Boxing ===
Lightweight (up to 60 kg)

- Leonard Arthur Cook – Gold

=== Cycling ===
Time Trial

- Edgar Laurence 'Dunc' Gray – Gold, 1:16.4 (GR)

10 miles

- Edgar Laurence 'Dunc' Gray – Did not finish
- Horrace James Pethybridge – Did not finish

1,000 yards Sprint

- Horrace James Pethybridge – Silver

=== Swimming ===
100 yd Freestyle

- Reginald Vaughan Clark

100 yd Backstroke

- Reginald Vaughan Clark

3×110 yd Medley Relay

- Reginald Vaughan Clark – 4th, 3:16.8
- Alan Edward Higginson – 4th, 3:16.8
- Noel Phillip Ryan – 4th, 3:16.8

200 yd Breaststroke, Men

- Alan Edward Higginson – 4th, 2:44.8

200 yd Breaststroke, Women

- Clare Dennis – Gold, 2:50.2 (GR)

440 yd Freestyle

- Noel Phillip Ryan – Gold, 5:03.0 (GR)

1,500 yd Freestyle

- Noel Phillip Ryan – Gold, 18:25.4 (GR)

=== Diving ===
Springboard

- Lesley Julia Thompson – Silver, 60.49 points

Platform

- Lesley Julia Thompson – Silver, 27.64 points

=== Wrestling ===
Lightweight (up to 68 kg)

- Richard Edward 'Dick' Garrard – Gold

Heavyweight (up to 100 kg)

- John Lambert 'Jack' Knight – Gold

== Officials ==
- Honorary Manager Herbert Krause Maxwell (NSW)
- Hon Chaperone – Millicent Isabel Watson (VIC)

== See also ==
- Australia at the 1932 Summer Olympics
- Australia at the 1936 Summer Olympics
