= David Norris (diver) =

Australian Olympic diver

Personal information
- Born: 21 June 1920; Evandale, Tasmania, Australia
- Died: 5 December 1972 (aged 52); Toora, Victoria, Australia

Sport
- Sport: Diving

David John Norris (21 June 1920 – 5 December 1972) was an Australian springboard diver who competed in the 1948 Summer Olympics, where he finished 16th. He was 5-times Australia 3m springboard champion, and also competed at the 1938 and 1950 British Empire Games.
