= Robin Biddulph =

Australian swimmer (1920–1995)

Personal information
- Born: Hereward Robin Biddulph; 1920
- Died: 2 March 1995 (aged 74–75) Sydney, Australia

Sport
- Sport: Swimming
Medal record
Representing Australia
British Empire Games
Bronze medal – third place	1938 Sydney	440yd freestyle
Bronze medal – third place	1938 Sydney	4×220yd freestyle relay

Hereward Robin Biddulph (1920 – 2 March 1995) was an Australian swimmer who specialised in freestyle. He was the Australian national swimming champion, an Australian and New South Wales record holder and a bronze medallist in the British Empire Games in 1938.

Biddulph was born in 1920. In December 1937, at the age of 17, he out swan the Australian record holder Noel Ryan and broke the Australian record for 440 yards at the Manly Swimming Club by 2.2 seconds. Biddulph died in Mona Vale, a suburb of Sydney, on 2 March 1995.

== See also ==
- List of Commonwealth Games medallists in swimming (men)
