= Lynda Adams =

Canadian diver (1920–1997)

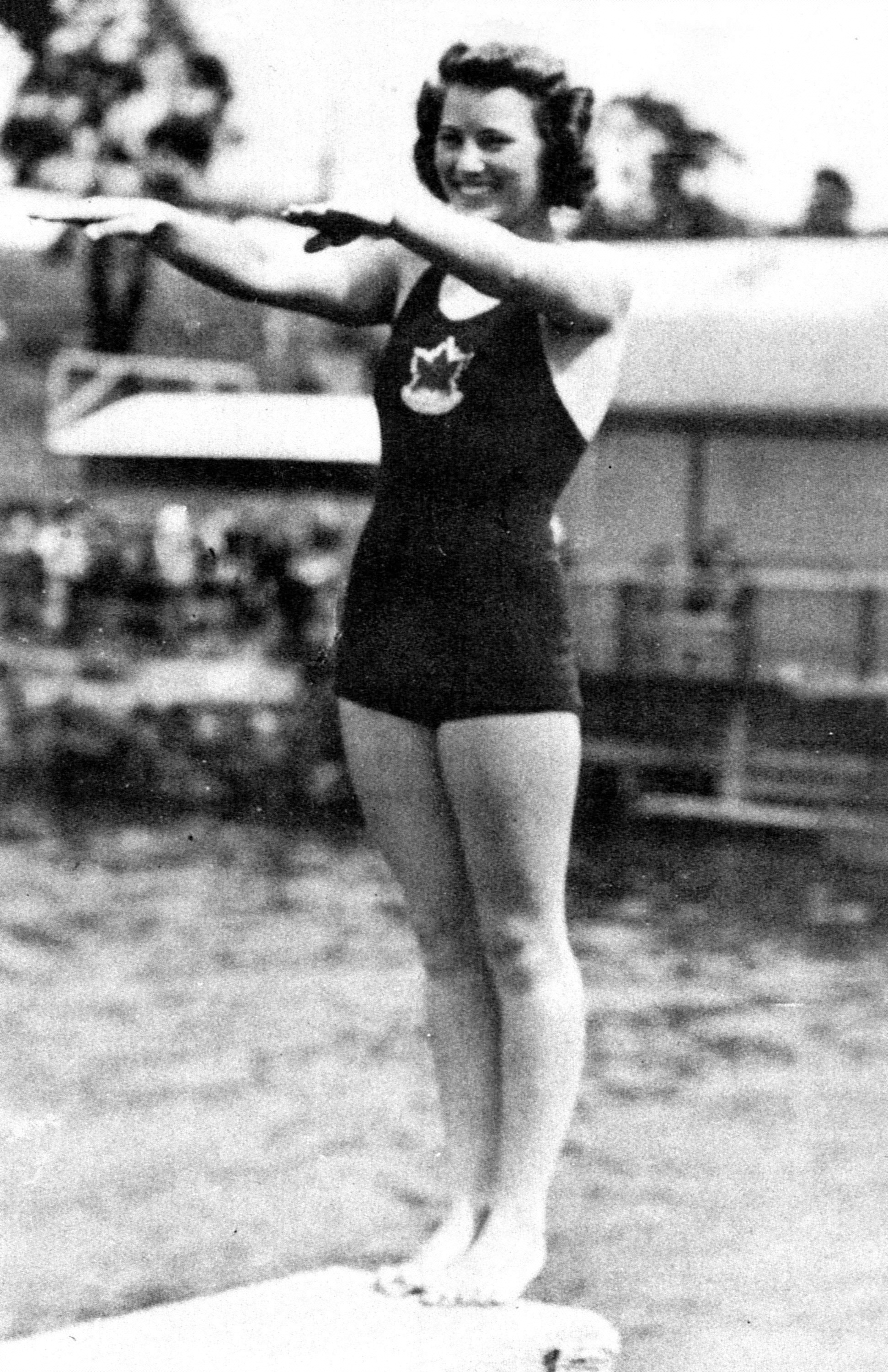
- Adams in 1938

Personal information
- Full name: Lynda Riley Adams
- Born: June 4, 1920 Vancouver, British Columbia, Canada
- Died: February 26, 1997 (aged 76)

Sport
- Sport: Diving
Medal record
Representing Canada
British Empire Games
Silver medal – second place	1938 Sydney	3 m springboard
Silver medal – second place	1938 Sydney	10 m platform
Bronze medal – third place	1950 Auckland	3 m springboard

Lynda Riley Adams (later Hunt; June 4, 1920 – February 26, 1997) was a Canadian diver who won three medals in total at the British Empire Games in 1938 and 1950. She competed in the 3 m springboard and 10 m platform at the 1936 Summer Olympics and placed 10th and 19th, respectively.
