= Doris Storey =

English swimmer (1919–2005)

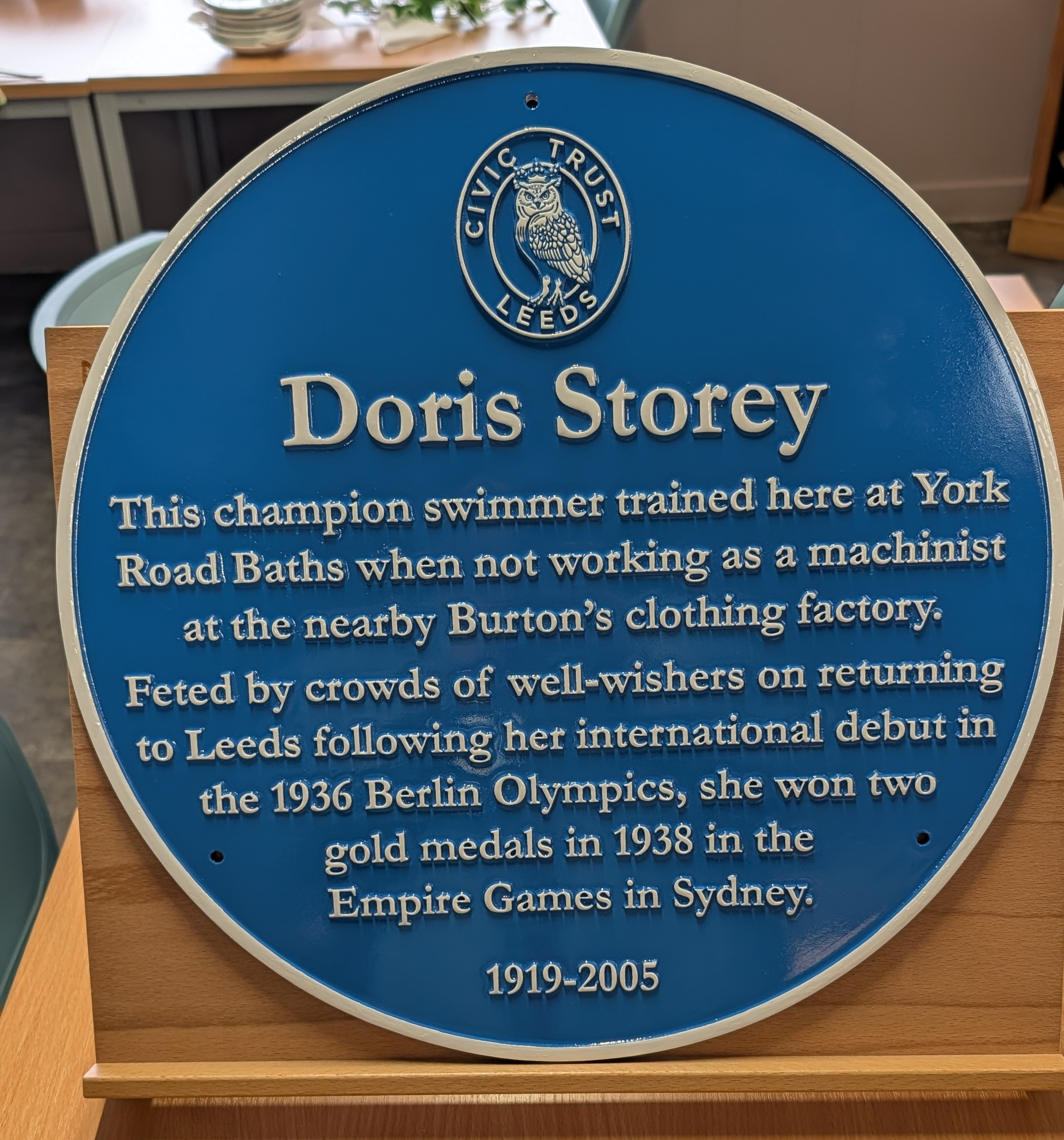

Personal information
- Born: 21 December 1919 Leeds, England
- Died: 21 October 2005 (aged 85) Wakefield, England

Sport
- Sport: Swimming
- Strokes: breaststroke
- Club: Montague Burton SC; East Leeds SC
Medal record
Women's swimming
Representing Great Britain
European Championships
Silver medal – second place	1938 London	200 m breaststroke
Representing England
British Empire Games
Gold medal – first place	1938 Sydney	220 yd breaststroke
Gold medal – first place	1938 Sydney	3×110 yd medley

Doris Storey (21 December 1919 – 21 October 2005), later known by her married name Doris Quarmby, was an English breaststroke swimmer from Leeds who competed for Great Britain at the 1936 Summer Olympics and for England at the 1938 British Empire Games.

== Biography ==
Storey was born in Leeds, England and swam for Montague Burton SC and East Leeds SC.

In 1936 she finished sixth in the 200 metre breaststroke event having injured her arm in a fall before the final.

At the 1938 Empire Games in Sydney, Australia she won the gold medal in the 220 yards breaststroke competition. She was also a member of the English relay team which won the gold medal in the 3×110 yards medley contest.
