= Joan Langdon =

Canadian swimmer (1922–2022)

Personal information
- Full name: Joan Marjorie Langdon
- National team: Canada
- Born: December 2, 1922 Ventura, California, U.S.
- Died: March 15, 2022 (aged 99) Chilliwack, British Columbia, Canada

Sport
- Sport: Swimming
- Strokes: Breaststroke
- Club: Vancouver Amateur Swim Club
Medal record
Women's swimming
Representing Canada
British Empire Games
Bronze medal – third place	1938 Sydney	220 yd breaststroke

Joan Marjorie McLagan (née Langdon; December 2, 1922 – March 15, 2022) was a Canadian competitive swimmer and breaststroker.

As McLagan reached the peak of her swimming career during World War II, she was forced to limit herself to competing at national and Pacific Northwest championships, as all major international meets were temporarily suspended during the war years.

She was coached by fellow British Columbia Sports Hall of Fame member Percy Norman.

By age thirteen, McLagan had set her first Canadian record and was a member of the 1936 Canadian Olympic team which competed in Berlin. She competed in the first round of the 200-metre breaststroke but did not advance.

At the 1938 British Empire Games she won a bronze medal in the 220-yard breaststroke and helped the Canadian medley relay team to a fourth place finish.

Between 1936 and her retirement from active competition in 1944, McLagan won numerous national swim titles and set many records including: 150-yard medley relay; 50, 100, 150, 220, and 440-yard breaststroke; 300-yard medley relay; and the 150-yard individual medley.

In 1940, Langdon set a world record for the 50-yard breaststroke. She was the recipient of the Velma Springstead Trophy as Canada’s outstanding female athlete in 1942 and 1943.

After her retirement from active competition, she worked as a teacher.

She was inducted into the British Columbia Sports Hall of Fame in the Class of 1988 in the category of swimming. At the time of her death, in Chilliwack, B.C., at the age of 99, she was one of the last two surviving competitors from the 1936 Olympics.

Awards
Preceded by Mary Rose Thacker	Velma Springstead Trophy winner 1943	Succeeded by Rhona Wurtele & Rhoda Wurtele
