= Percy Oliver =

Australian swimmer

Personal information
- Full name: Percival Cale Oliver
- Nickname: "Percy"
- National team: Australia
- Born: 1 April 1919 Perth, Western Australia
- Died: 9 July 2011 (aged 92) Perth, Western Australia

Sport
- Sport: Swimming
- Strokes: Freestyle, backstroke
Medal record
Men's swimming
Representing Australia
British Empire Games
Gold medal – first place	1938 Sydney	110 yd backstroke
Bronze medal – third place	1938 Sydney	3×110 yd medley

Percival Cale Oliver (1 April 1919 – 9 July 2011) was an Australian backstroke swimmer who competed in the 1936 Summer Olympics.

Oliver was born in Nedlands, Western Australia and attended Hale School. He won 13 freestyle and backstroke Australian titles.

At the age seventeen he competed at the 1936 Summer Olympics in Berlin, where he finished seventh in the 100-metre backstroke.

Two years later he won gold in the 110-yard backstroke at the 1938 British Empire Games in Sydney. He also won a bronze medal as member of the Australian team in the 3×110-yard medley contest and competed in the 110-yard freestyle.

Oliver went on to teach at Mt Lawley and Hollywood Senior High Schools before taking over the administration of the Education Department's vacation swimming program.

He died on 9 July 2011 at the age of 92.

== See also ==
- List of Commonwealth Games medallists in swimming (men)
