= Ron Masters =

Australian diver (1913–1972)

Personal information
- Born: April 20, 1913 Bendigo, Victoria, Australia
- Died: March 6, 1972 (aged 58) Traralgon, Victoria, Australia

Sport
- Sport: Diving
Medal record
Representing Australia
British Empire Games
Gold medal – first place	1938 Sydney	3 m springboard
Silver medal – second place	1938 Sydney	high diving

Ronald Masters (20 April 1913 – 6 March 1972) was an Australian diver who competed in the 1936 Summer Olympics.

In 1936 he finished 14th in the 3 metre springboard event and 15th in the 10 metre platform competition. At the 1938 Empire Games he won the gold medal in the high diving contest and the silver medal in the 3 metre springboard event.
