= George Athans Sr. =

Canadian diver (1921–2007)

Personal information
- Full name: George Dimitri Athans Sr.
- Born: January 4, 1921 Kelowna, British Columbia, Canada
- Died: February 27, 2007 (aged 86)

Sport
- Sport: Diving
Medal record
Representing Canada
Commonwealth Games
| Gold medal – first place | 1950 Auckland | 3m springboard |
| Silver medal – second place | 1950 Auckland | 10m platform |

George Dimitri Athans Sr. (4 January 1921 – 27 February 2007) was a Canadian diver. He was born in Kelowna, British Columbia, and was the father of Gary Athans. He competed at the 1936 Summer Olympics in Berlin, where he placed 25th in 10 metre platform. He competed at the 1948 Summer Olympics, where he placed 8th in men's platform and 9th in springboard.
