= Leslie Palmer (water polo) =

British water polo player

Personal information
- Full name: Leslie Palmer
- Born: 17 June 1910 Cardiff, Wales
- Died: 1997 (aged 86–87) Glamorgan, Wales

Sport
- Country: Great Britain
- Sport: Water Polo

Leslie Palmer (born 17 June 1910, died 1997) was a British water polo player who competed in the 1936 Summer Olympics.

Leslie Palmer began his career with Barry SC in both swimming and water polo. At the age of sixteen, he won the Welsh half-mile championship in 1926, and he kept it the next year after joining the Cardiff Polytechnic SC. In 1926 and 1927, Palmer won the prestigious 2-mile Taff Swim, which was held for the Long-Distance Championship of Wales. He also won the Welsh 220-yard title. He prevailed by the slimmest of margins in both cases—just inches in 1926. Shelagh Browning, his future wife, also triumphed in the renowned race twice, in 1936 and 1937.

Palmer led the Polytechnic team to multiple Welsh Senior Water Polo titles while playing water polo. In addition, he captained Wales and played county polo for Glamorgan, continuing to do so after turning forty. Palmer went on to become a swimming and water polo coach. Before taking over as Great Britain's manager in 1958, he coached the Welsh polo team for four years.

He was part of the British team which finished eighth in the 1936 tournament. He played one match, against Austria.
