= Zilpha Grant =

British swimmer

Personal information
- Born: 29 July 1919 Chorlton-cum-Hardy, England
- Died: 31 January 2011 (aged 91) Radcliffe, Greater Manchester England

Sport
- Sport: Swimming
- Strokes: Freestyle
- Club: South Manchester SC
Medal record
Women's swimming
Representing England
British Empire Games
Bronze medal – third place	1938 Sydney	4×110 yd freestyle
Representing Great Britain
European Championships (LC)
Bronze medal – third place	1938 London	4×100 m freestyle

Zilpha Grant (29 July 1919 – 31 January 2011), later known by her married name Zilpha Wheelton, was an English freestyle swimmer who competed for Great Britain in the 1936 Summer Olympics.

== Biography ==
She was born in Chorlton-cum-Hardy, Manchester.

In 1936 she was a member of the British relay team which finished sixth in the 4×100-metre freestyle relay event. In the 100-metre freestyle competition she was eliminated in the first round.

At the 1938 British Empire Games in Sydney, Australia, she was a member of the English relay teams that won a bronze medal in the 4×110 yd freestyle relay contest.
