= Frederick Dove =

British swimmer

Personal information
- Born: 27 September 1917 Royal Tunbridge Wells, England
- Died: 19 June 1980 (aged 62) Royal Tunbridge Wells, England

Sport
- Sport: Swimming
- Strokes: Freestyle
- Club: RTW Monson Swimming Club
Medal record
Men's swimming
Representing Great Britain
European Championships
Silver medal – second place	1938 London	100 m freestyle
Bronze medal – third place	1938 London	4×200 m freestyle
Representing England
British Empire Games
Gold medal – first place	1938 Sydney	4×220 yd freestyle
Gold medal – first place	1938 Sydney	3×110 yd medley

George Frederick Dove (27 September 1917 – 19 June 1980) was an English competitive freestyle swimmer who represented Great Britain at the Olympics and European championships, and England in the British Empire Games, during the 1930s.

== Biography ==
Dove was born in Royal Tunbridge Wells, England and swam for the Monson Swimming club and Otter swimming club.

In the 1936 Summer Olympics in Berlin, whilst suffering from a viral infection, he was eliminated in the first round of the men's 100-metre freestyle.

At the 1934 British Empire Games in London, he participated in the 100-yard freestyle competition and finished fourth. Four years later at the 1938 British Empire Games in Sydney, he was part of the English men's team which won the gold medal in the 4×220-yard freestyle relay, as well as in the 3×110 yards medley event.

== See also ==
- List of Commonwealth Games medallists in swimming (men)
