= Mostyn Ffrench-Williams =

British swimmer (1914–1963)

Personal information
- Born: 12 October 1914 London, England
- Died: 11 November 1963 (aged 49) St Austell, England
- Height: 178 cm (5 ft 10 in)

Sport
- Sport: Swimming
- Strokes: Freestyle, backstroke
- Club: Penguin Swimming Club
Medal record
Men's swimming
Representing England
British Empire Games
Gold medal – first place	1938 Sydney	4×220 yd freestyle
Silver medal – second place	1934 London	4×200 yd freestyle
Bronze medal – third place	1934 London	3×110 yd medley

Mostyn Yanto Ffrench-Williams (12 October 1914 – 11 November 1963) was an English competition freestyle and backstroke swimmer who represented Great Britain at the Olympics, and swam for England at the British Empire Games, during the 1930s.

== Biography ==
Ffrench-Williams was born in London and swam for the Penguin Swimming Club.

In the 1932 Summer Olympics, he finished fifth with the British team in the 4×200-metre freestyle relay event. In the 100-metre freestyle competition he was eliminated in the first round.

Four years later the 1936 Summer Olympics in Berlin, he was a member of the British team which finished sixth with the British team in the 4×200-metre freestyle relay contest at the 1936 Games. He also swam in the 100-metre freestyle event but was eliminated in the first round again.

At the 1934 British Empire Games in London, he was a member of the English team which won the silver medal in the 4×200-yard freestyle competition. In the 3×110-yard medley contest he won a bronze medal with the English team. Four years later at the 1938 Empire Games in Sydney, he was part of the English team which won the gold medal in the 4×220-yard freestyle event. In Sydney he also participated in the backstroke competition.

== See also ==
- List of Commonwealth Games medallists in swimming (men)
