= Pat Norton =

Australian swimmer

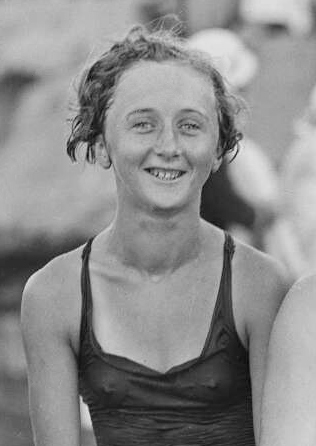
- Norton in 1933

Personal information
- Full name: Patricia Norton
- Nickname: "Pat"
- National team: Australia
- Born: 20 March 1919
- Died: 2 September 2007 (aged 88) Killarney Vale, New South Wales
- Height: 1.60 m (5 ft 3 in)

Sport
- Sport: Swimming
- Strokes: Backstroke, freestyle, medley
- Club: Bondi Ladies Swim Club
Medal record
Representing Australia
British Empire Games
Gold medal – first place	1938 Sydney	110 yd backstroke
Silver medal – second place	1938 Sydney	4×110 yd freestyle
Bronze medal – third place	1938 Sydney	3×110 yd medley

Patricia Norton (20 March 1919 – 2 September 2007), later known by her married name Patricia Down, was an Australian backstroke swimmer. She competed in the 1936 Summer Olympics and was eliminated in the semi-finals of the 100-metre backstroke event. At the 1938 Empire Games she won the gold medal in the 110-yard backstroke competition. She also won a silver medal with the Australian team in the 4×110-yard freestyle relay contest and a bronze medal in the 3×110-yard medley relay event.
