= Les Palmer (footballer) =

English footballer

Personal information
- Full name: Leslie Palmer
- Date of birth: 16 December 1923
- Place of birth: Barrow-in-Furness, England
- Date of death: December 2002 (aged 78–79)
- Place of death: Barrow-in-Furness, England
- Position: Wing half

Senior career*
Years	Team	Apps	(Gls)
–1949	Holker Central Old Boys		
1945	Leyton Orient	0	(0)
1949	Barrow	1	(0)
- * Club domestic league appearances and goals

Les Palmer (16 December 1923 – December 2002) was an English professional footballer who made one appearance in the Football League for Barrow.
