= Douglas Dexter =

British fencer

Personal information
- Born: 5 January 1887
- Died: 21 September 1937 (aged 50)

Sport
- Sport: Fencing

Douglas Dexter (5 January 1887 – 21 September 1937) was a British fencer. He competed in the individual and team épée events at the 1936 Summer Olympics.
