= Edna Hughes =

English competition swimmer

Personal information
- Born: 1 August 1916 Walsall, England
- Died: 17 November 1990 (aged 74) Borth, Wales

Sport
- Sport: Swimming
- Strokes: Freestyle
- Club: Walsall SC
Medal record
Women's swimming
Representing Great Britain
Olympic Games
Bronze medal – third place	1932 Los Angeles	4×100 m freestyle
European Championships (LC)
Bronze medal – third place	1934 Magdeburg	4×100 m freestyle
Representing England
British Empire Games
Silver medal – second place	1934 London	3×110 yd medley
Bronze medal – third place	1934 London	4×100 yd freestyle
Bronze medal – third place	1938 Sydney	4×110 yd freestyle

Edna Tildesley Hughes (1 August 1916 – 17 November 1990), later known by her married name Edna Redwood, was an English competition swimmer who represented Great Britain in the 1932 Summer Olympics and 1936 Summer Olympics.

== Biography ==
She was born in Walsall and died in Ceredigion in Wales.

In the 1932 Olympics she won bronze medal in the 4×100 m freestyle relay event. She was also fourth in her first round heat of 100 m freestyle event and did not advance. Four years later she was sixth in the 4×100 m freestyle relay event.

At the 1938 British Empire Games in Sydney, Australia, she won a bronze medal in the 4×110 yd freestyle relay.

== See also ==
- List of Olympic medalists in swimming (women)
