= North Sydney Olympic Pool =

Swimming venue in Sydney, New South Wales

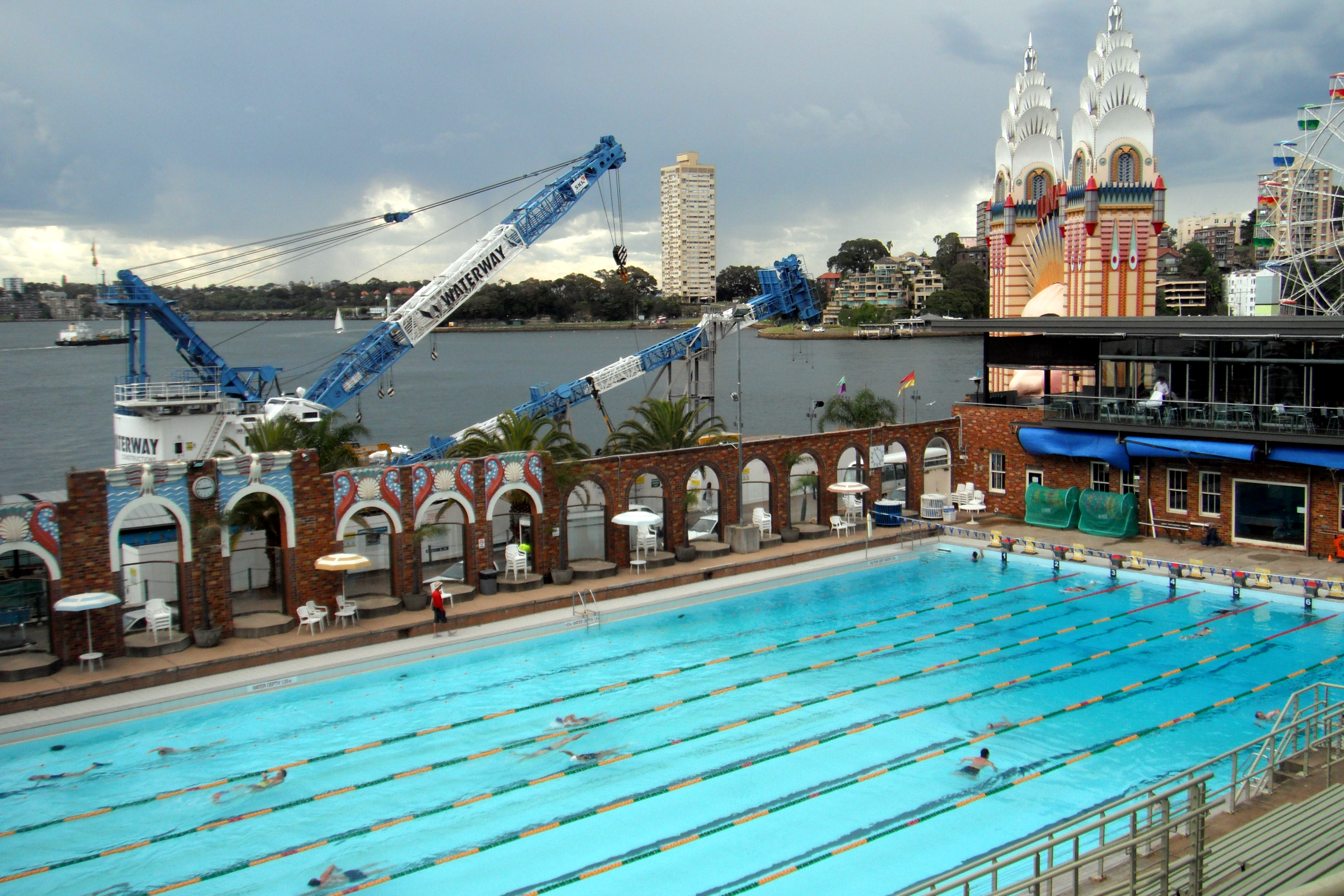
- The facility's namesake Olympic-size swimming pool
- Interactive map of North Sydney Olympic Pool
- Location: Milsons Point, New South Wales, Australia
- Coordinates: 33°50′57″S 151°12′40″E
- Owner: North Sydney Council
- Public transit: Milsons Point; Milsons Point

Construction
- Opened: 4 April 1936
- Renovated: 2021–2026
- Reopened: 7 August 2026

Website
- https://northsydneyolympicpool.com.au/

The North Sydney Olympic Pool is a heritage listed swimming and exercise complex in Milsons Point, New South Wales. It is notable for its location adjacent to Sydney Harbour, between the Sydney Harbour Bridge and Luna Park.

== History ==
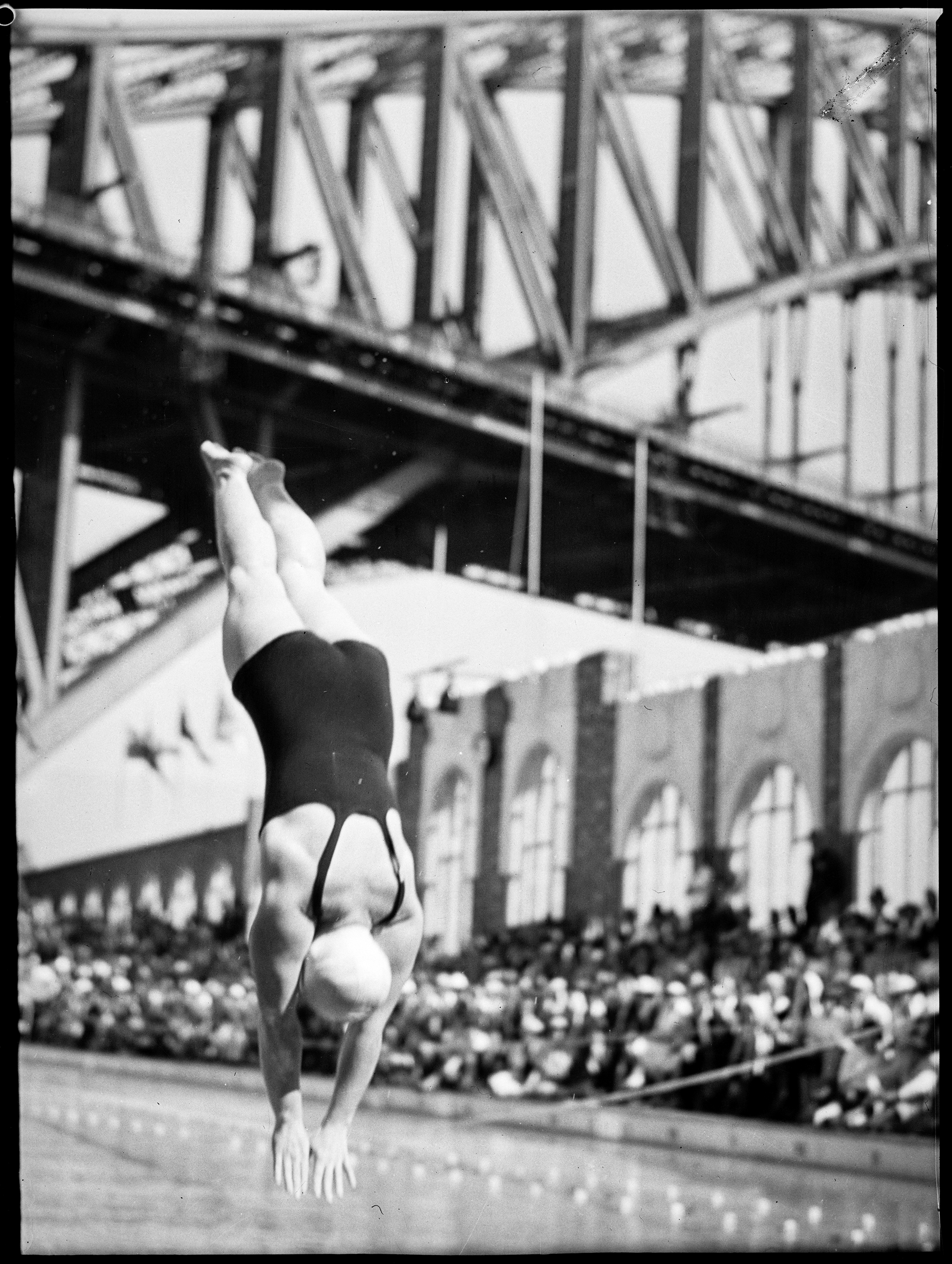
Diver at the Empire Games, North Sydney Olympic Pool, 1938

Following the completion of the Sydney Harbour Bridge, the land previously occupied by the Dorman Long workshops was returned to government ownership, and applications for tenders to redevelop the site were opened. At the same time, the owners of Luna Park Glenelg were considering relocating to Sydney, and took interest in the harbourfront site.

The idea of an amusement park at the foot of the Harbour Bridge initially drew major criticism from North Sydney Council and local residents. However, traffic over the bridge at the time was below expectations, with the state government deciding that attracting people to North Sydney for leisure would be beneficial. In 1934, plans to build Luna Park were approved, with the land directly to the south of the park to be used for a municipal pool.

Designed by architects Rudder & Grout in the Inter-War Free Classical style with art deco-style decorations, North Sydney Olympic Pool opened on 4 April 1936. The pool hosted the swimming and diving events for the 1938 Empire Games.

Eighty-six world records have been set at the pool by such swimming greats as Jon and Ilsa Konrads, Lorraine Crapp, Frank O'Neill, Judy Joy Davies, John Devitt, Shane Gould and Michelle Ford. In 1960, at the Australian National Swimming Championships and Olympic Trials, six world records were set in the single meet.

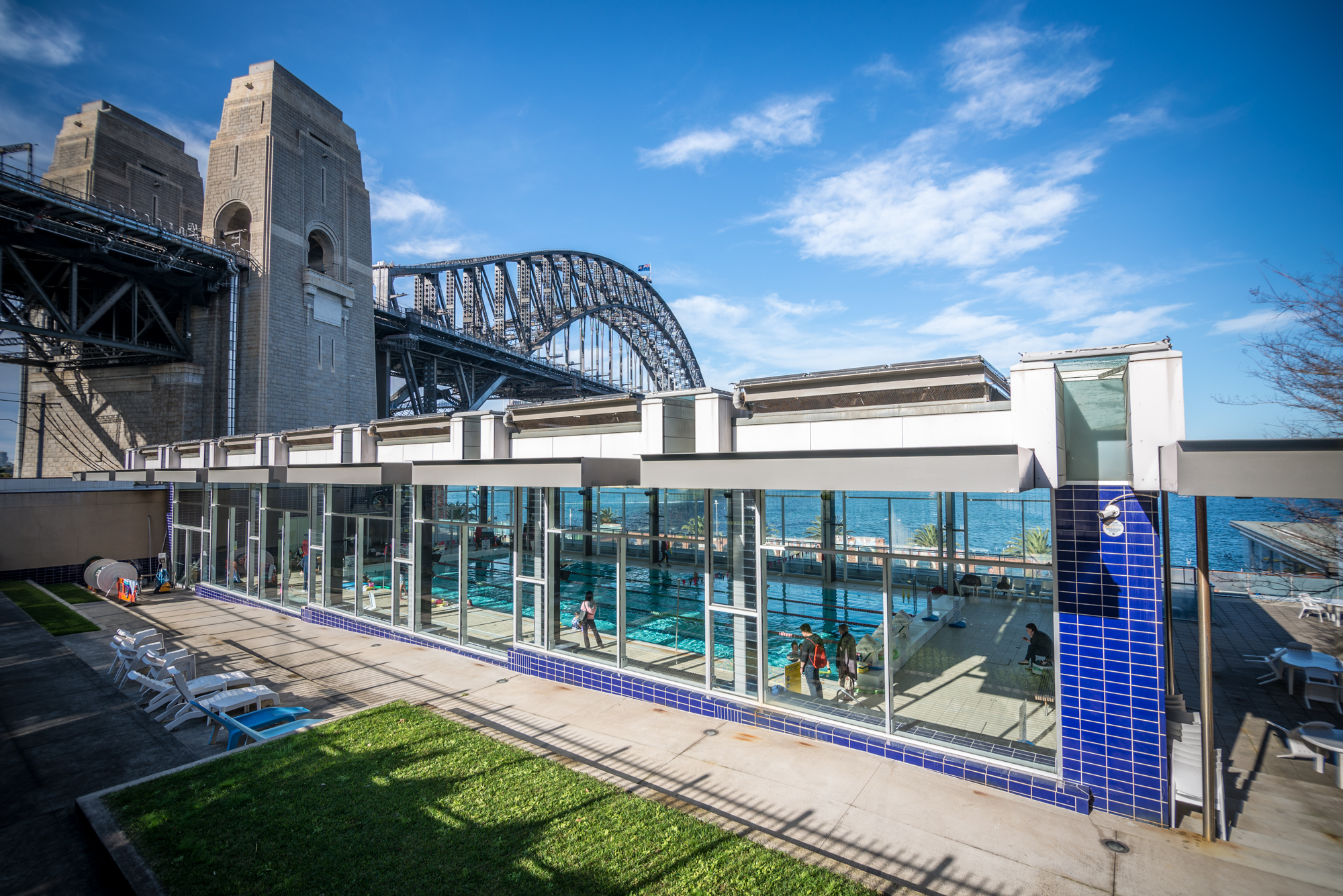
The 25 metre pool, which was demolished in 2021.

Heating was added in 2000 and a 25-metre (82 ft) indoor pool was built in 2001 atop the grandstands.

== Renovation ==
By the early 21st century, the condition of the facility had deteriorated. Plans were announced in 2019 to rebuild most of the complex. The 50 metre pool, grandstands, and 25 metre pool were to be demolished and rebuilt. Further additions included new food venues and a new gym, as well as modern change rooms and facilities.

Redevelopment plans were approved in 2020, projected to cost $48 million. The North Sydney Council received a $10 million grant from the Federal Government to fund the project. The scheme this funding originates from was announced in the prior federal election as the Female Facilities and Water Safety Stream, aimed at funding female change rooms and sporting facilities. This attracted criticism as the scheme had originally been billed as for regional areas. Prime Minister Scott Morrison stated that the scheme was never exclusively for regional facilities, blaming the backlash on misinformation. North Sydney Mayor Jilly Gibson defended the federal funding, claiming the North Sydney Pool is "Definitely a regional facility," as it's used by people from across New South Wales and Australia.

The facility's redevelopment had been controversial amongst North Sydney councillors. By early December 2020, the council was still assessing tenders, despite the scheduled closing date of 31 December. By mid-December, the budget had blown out to $64 million. Councillors voted to keep the complex open past 31 December until contracts had been signed. By January 2021, it was announced that Icon Construction had won the contract to conduct the renovations. This attracted media attention due to Icon being the company responsible for the construction of the troubled Opal Tower.

The complex closed on 28 February 2021 and work started in March, with an expected reopening date of late 2022. By the end of 2021, the reopening date had been delayed to February 2023. In October 2022, Mayor Zoe Baker ordered a probe into the project. The review found that the project is more than $30 million over budget, and that the final cost would be at least $89 million. Councillor Jilly Gibson, who was mayor when the pool redevelopment was approved, said the review was flawed and omitted relevant information.

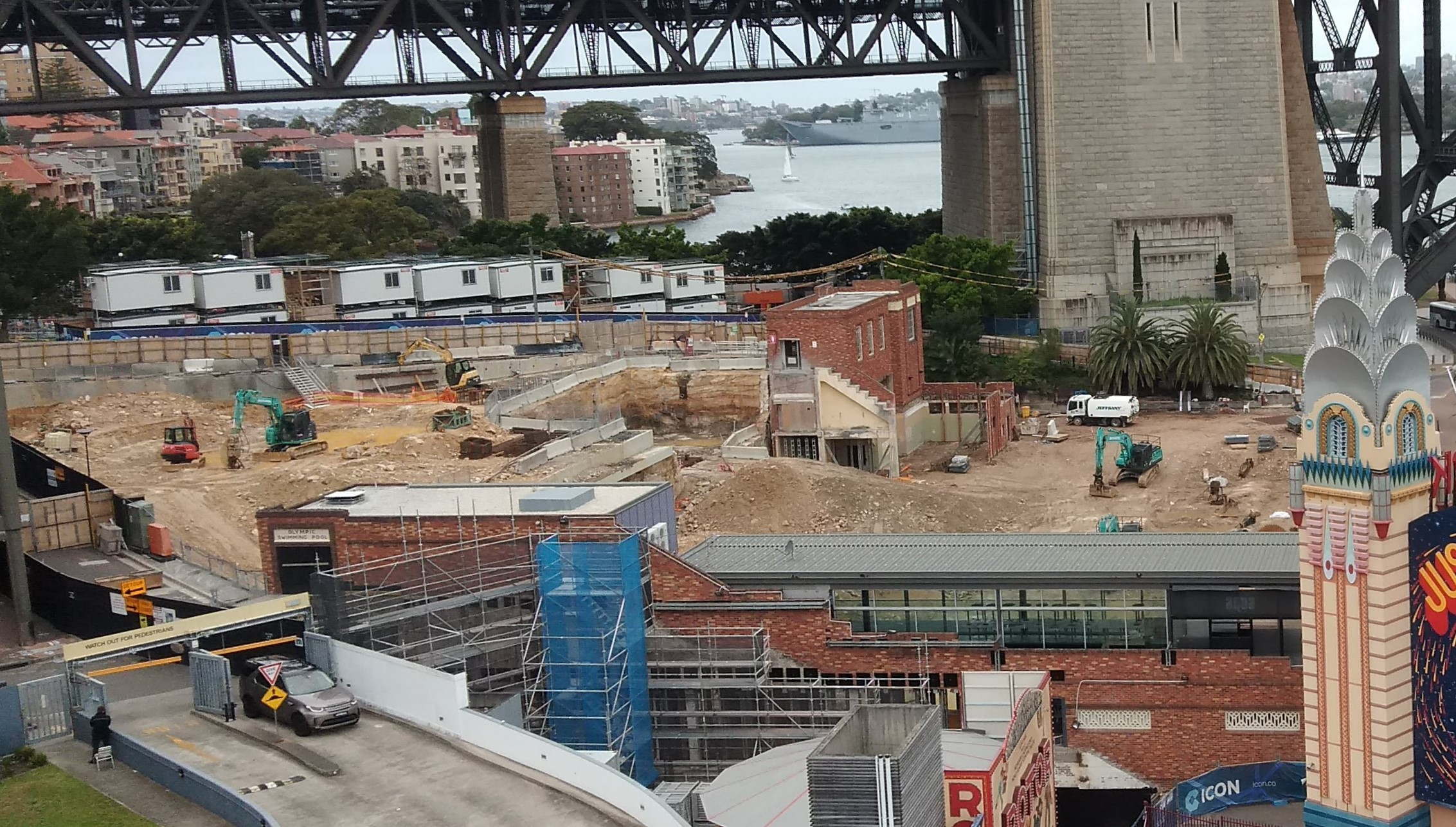
Site in November 2021

In 2023, structural design flaws forced the newly built roof of the indoor pool to be removed. This led to Icon taking the North Sydney Council to court in May 2025 for $28 million. The company claims that the council was repeatedly making revisions to designs of the replacement roof, leading to further delays and increased costs.

In November 2024, with the renovation still underway, North Sydney Council announced it was considering raising council rates. The cost of the pool, which by this point had blown out to $90 million, had left the council in a weak liquidity position. Its application to raise rates was denied in May 2025 by IPART.

As of April 2026, the cost estimates for the project are at $122 million. Works were completed in May 2026, and the complex reopened on 7 August.

== Gallery ==
Canadian swimmer Lynda Adams, diving into the 'Olympic Pool' front of the Sydney Harbour Bridge, North Shore, 31 January 1938

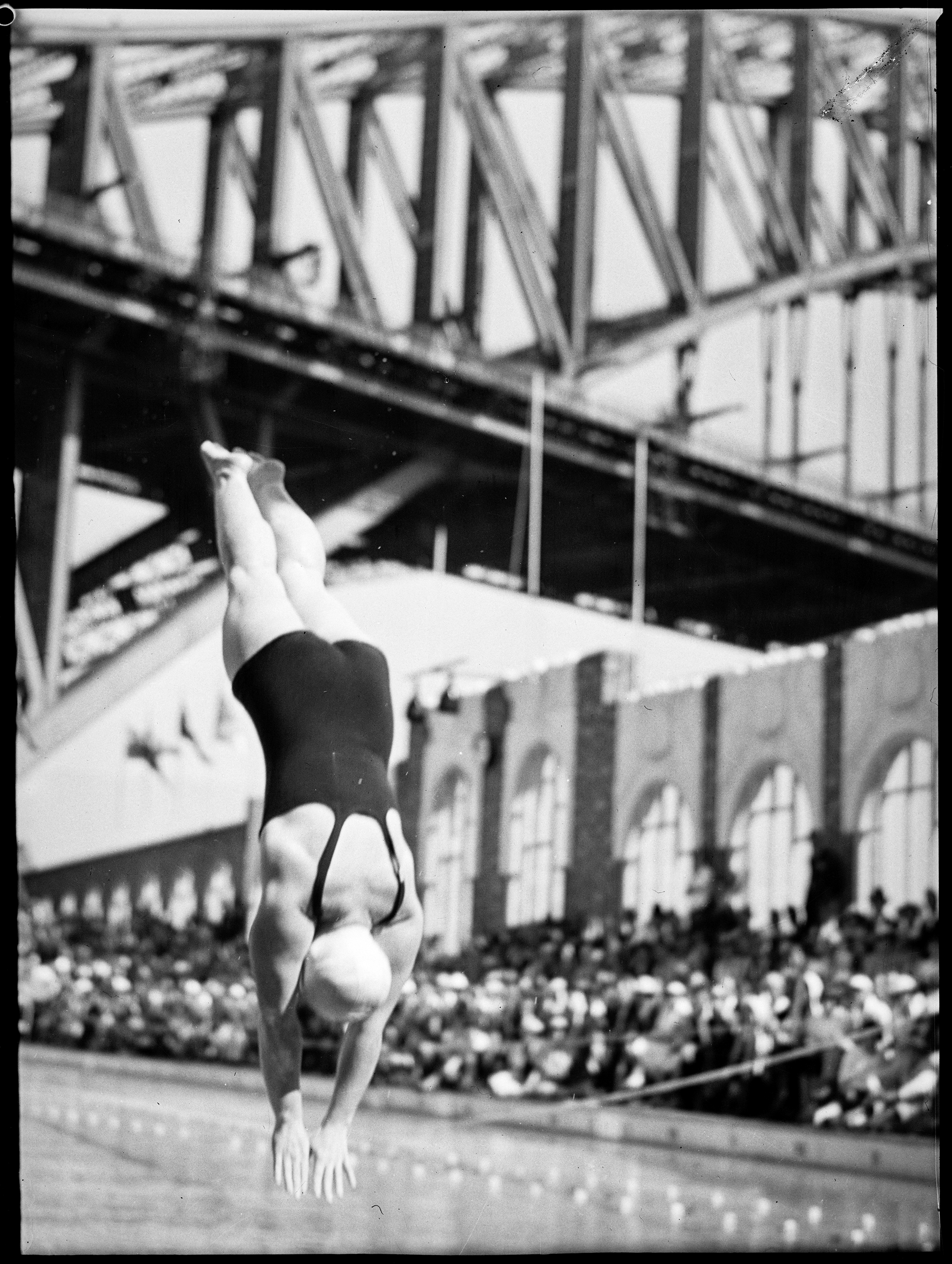
Diver at the Empire Games, North Sydney Olympic Pool, 11 February 1938

North Sydney Olympic Pool by Kate Branch

Frogs Decoration

Pool Decoration

WAAAF swimming at North Sydney in 1943 (Photo #1)

WAAAF swimming at North Sydney in 1943 (Photo #2)

WAAAF swimming at North Sydney in 1943 (Photo #3)

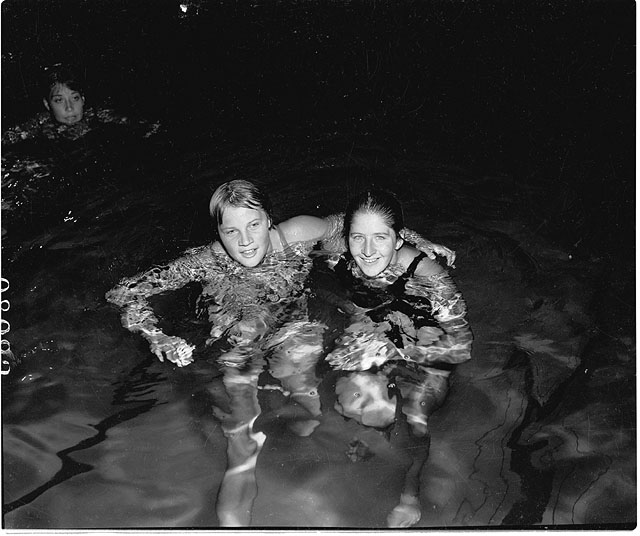
Dawn Fraser and Ilsa Konrads at the Australian National Swimming Championships and Olympic Trials, North Sydney Olympic Pool, 27 February 1960
