= Evelyn de Lacy =

Australian swimmer

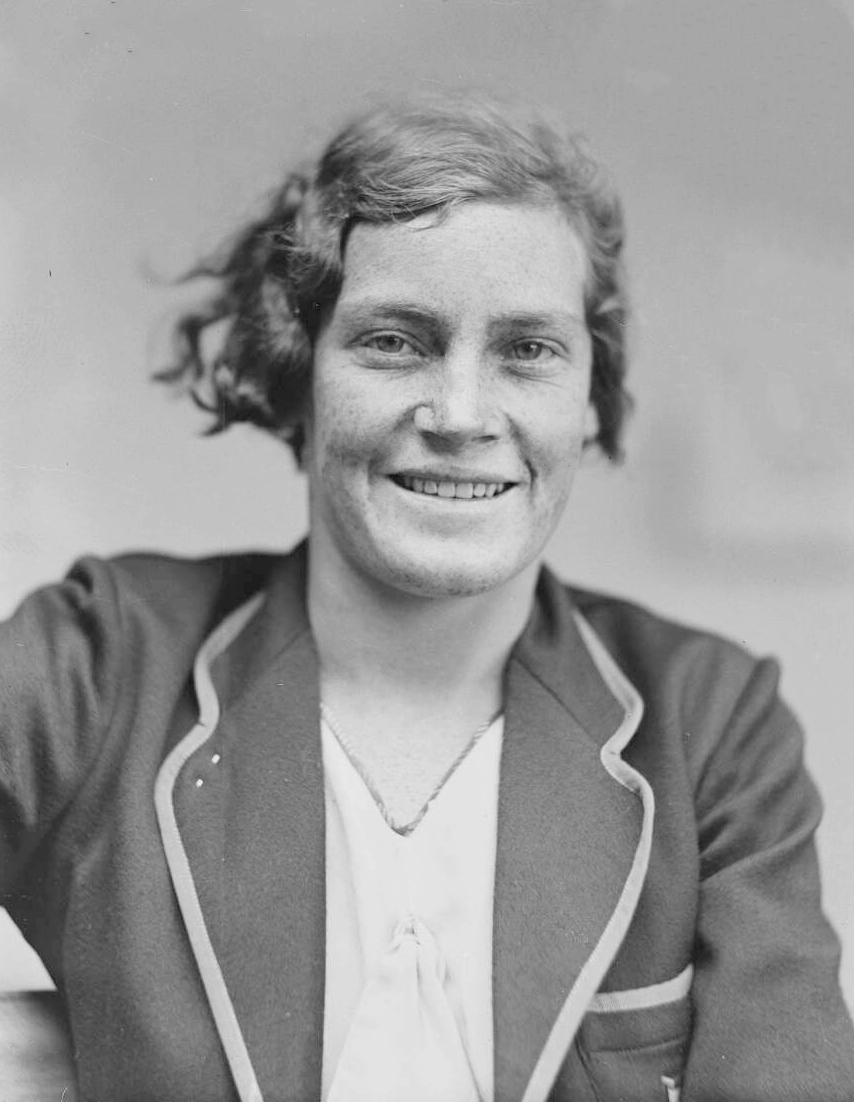
- De Lacy in 1934

Personal information
- Full name: Evelyn Rose de Lacy
- National team: Australia
- Born: 21 November 1917 Maylands, Western Australia
- Died: 27 June 2004 (aged 86) Sydney, New South Wales, Australia

Sport
- Sport: Swimming
- Strokes: Freestyle
- Club: Bronte Amateur Swimming Club
Medal record
Representing Australia
British Empire Games
Gold medal – first place	1938 Sydney	110 yd freestyle
Silver medal – second place	1938 Sydney	4×110 yd freestyle
Bronze medal – third place	1938 Sydney	3×110 yd medley

Evelyn Rose de Lacy (21 November 1917 – 27 June 2004), also known by her married name Evelyn Whillier, was an Australian freestyle swimmer. As a 16-year-old on 18 December 1933 she set a Western Australian state record in the 100-yard freestyle race at Crawley Baths. She later competed in the 1936 Summer Olympics and was eliminated in the semi-finals of the 100-metre freestyle event. In the 400-metre freestyle, she was eliminated in the first round. At the 1938 Empire Games she won the gold medal in the 110-yard freestyle contest. She was also a member of the Australian relay teams that won the silver medal in the 4×110-yard freestyle event and the bronze medal in the 3×110-yard medley competition.
