= Margery Hinton =

British swimmer

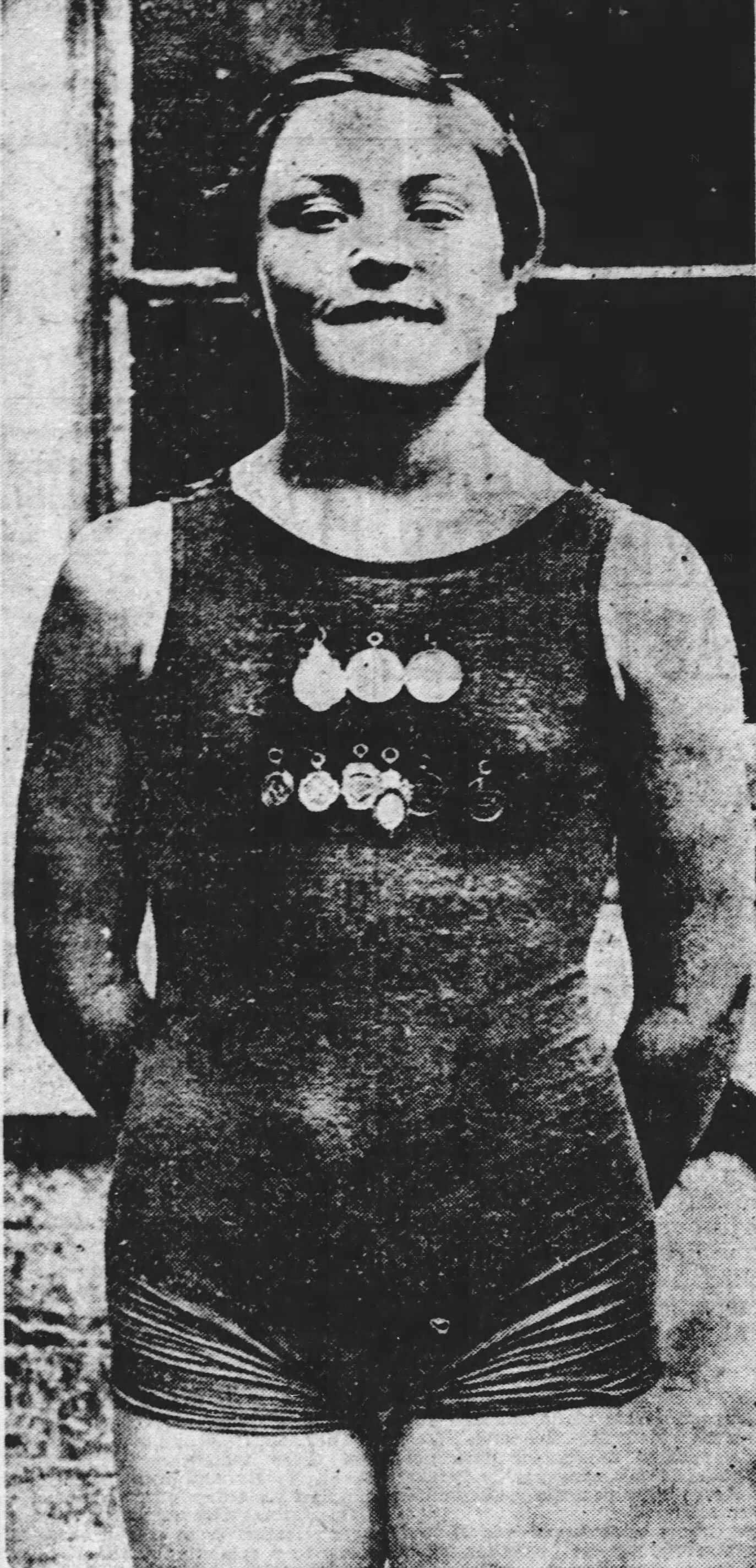
- Hinton in 1928

Personal information
- Born: 25 June 1915 Manchester, England
- Died: 18 February 1996 (aged 80) Manchester, England

Sport
- Sport: Swimming
- Strokes: Freestyle, breaststroke
- Club: South Manchester SC
Medal record
Women's swimming
Representing Great Britain
European Championships
Bronze medal – third place	1931 Paris	200 m breaststroke
Bronze medal – third place	1934 Magdeburg	4×100 m freestyle
Bronze medal – third place	1938 London	4×100 m freestyle
Representing England
British Empire Games
Gold medal – first place	1938 Sydney	3×110 yd medley
Silver medal – second place	1930 Hamilton	200 yd breaststroke
Bronze medal – third place	1934 London	200 yd breaststroke
Bronze medal – third place	1934 London	4×110 yd freestyle
Bronze medal – third place	1938 Sydney	4×110 yd freestyle

Margery Hinton (25 June 1915 – 18 February 1996) was an English breaststroke and freestyle swimmer who competed for Great Britain in the 1928 Summer Olympics, 1932 Summer Olympics, and 1936 Summer Olympics.

== Biography ==
Hinton was born in Manchester, England. In 1928, she was eliminated in the first round of the 200-metre breaststroke event. At these Games she was the youngest member of the Great Britain team. Four years later she finished fourth in the 200-metre breaststroke competition. At the 1936 Games she was eliminated in the first round of the 100-metre freestyle event.

Hinton first appeared at the Summer Olympics aged 13 years and 44 days. Her record, of being the youngest British competitor to appear at the Summer Olympics, remained unbroken for 93 years, until skateboarder Sky Brown appeared at the 2020 Summer Olympics aged 13 years and 11 days.

At the 1938 British Empire Games in Sydney, Australia, she won a gold medal in the 3×110 yd medley relay event and a bronze medal in the 4×110 yd freestyle relay.

== See also ==
- World record progression 200 metres breaststroke
