= Margaret Jeffery =

English swimmer (1920–2004)

Personal information
- National team: Great Britain
- Born: 23 January 1920 Bromely, Surrey, England
- Died: 12 September 2004 (aged 84) Kings Lynn, Norfolk, England

Sport
- Sport: Swimming
- Strokes: Freestyle
- Club: Croydon Ladies
Medal record
Women's swimming
Representing England
British Empire Games
Silver medal – second place	1938 London	440 yd freestyle

Margaret Kathleen Jeffery (23 January 1920 – 12 September 2004) was an English freestyle swimmer of the 1930s, who represented Great Britain in the Olympics and competed for England in the British Empire Games.

== Biography ==
At the 1936 Summer Olympics in Berlin, she was a member of the British women's that came sixth in the 4×100-metre freestyle relay. In the 400-metre freestyle she was eliminated in the semi-finals.

At the 1938 Empire Games in Sydney, Australia, she won the silver medal in the 440 yd freestyle contest.
