= Noel Ryan =

Australian swimmer

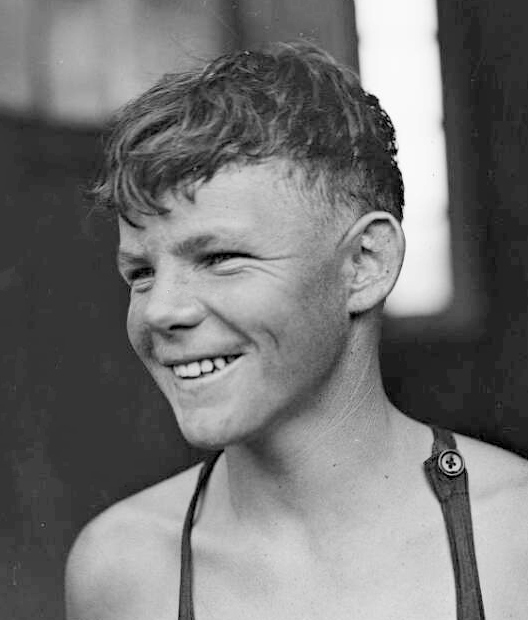
- Ryan in 1927

Personal information
- Full name: Noel Philip Ryan
- Nickname: "Tiger"
- National team: Australia
- Born: 1912 Manly, New South Wales
- Died: 23 November 1969 (aged 56–57) Sydney
- Height: 1.78 m (5 ft 10 in)

Sport
- Sport: Swimming
- Strokes: Freestyle
- Club: Manly Swimming Club
Medal record
Representing Australia
British Empire Games
Gold medal – first place	1930 Hamilton	400 yd freestyle
Gold medal – first place	1930 Hamilton	1500 yd freestyle
Gold medal – first place	1934 London	440 yd freestyle
Gold medal – first place	1934 London	1500 yd freestyle
Bronze medal – third place	1938 Sydney	4×220 yd freestyle

Noel Philip Ryan (1912 – 23 November 1969) was an Australian freestyle swimmer who competed in the 1932 Summer Olympics and the 1930 and 1934 British Empire Games. In 1932 he finished fourth in the 1500-metre freestyle. In the 400-metre freestyle, he was eliminated in the semi-finals and in the 100-metre freestyle event he was eliminated in the first round. Nicknamed "Tiger", Ryan won Australian swimming championships in most of the years between 1928 and 1941, in all winning 16 Australian and 27 New South Wales titles, plus four gold medals at the Empire Games of 1930 and 1934.
