= Norman Wainwright =

British swimmer (1914–2000)

Personal information
- Nationality: British (English)
- Born: July 4, 1914 Stoke on Trent, England
- Died: May 2, 2000 (aged 85) Stoke on Trent, England

Sport
- Sport: Swimming
- Strokes: freestyle
- Club: Hanley Swimming Club
Medal record
Representing Great Britain
European Championships
Bronze medal – third place	1934 Magdeburg	1500 m freestyle
Bronze medal – third place	1938 London	4×200 m freestyle
Bronze medal – third place	1938 London	400 m freestyle
Representing England
British Empire Games
Gold medal – first place	1938 Sydney	4×220 yd freestyle
Silver medal – second place	1934 London	440 yd freestyle
Silver medal – second place	1934 London	4×200 yd freestyle
Bronze medal – third place	1934 London	1500 yd freestyle
Bronze medal – third place	1938 Sydney	1650 yd freestyle

Norman Wainwright (4 July 1914 – 2 May 2000) was an English freestyle and backstroke swimmer who competed for Great Britain in the 1932 Summer Olympics, in the 1936 Summer Olympics, and in the 1948 Summer Olympics.

== Biography ==
Wainwright was born in Stoke-on-Trent, England.

In 1932 he was eliminated in the first round of the 400 metre freestyle event. Four years later he was a member of the British team which finished sixth with the British team in the 4×200 metre freestyle relay competition at the 1936 Games. In the 1500 metre freestyle contest he was eliminated in the semi-finals and in the 400 metre freestyle event he was eliminated in the first round.

His last Olympic appearance was in 1948 when he competed with the British team in the 4×200 metre freestyle relay competition which did not advance to the final.

At the 1934 Empire Games he was a member of the English team which won the silver medal in the 4×200 yards freestyle contest. He also won a silver medal in the 440 yards event and a bronze medal in the 1500 yards competition. Four years later at the 1938 Empire Games in Sydney he was part of the English team which won the gold medal in the 4×220 yards freestyle event. In Sydney he also won a bronze medal in the 1650 yards event and participated in the 110 yards backstroke competition.

== See also ==
- List of Commonwealth Games medallists in swimming (men)
