= 1938 British Empire Games =

Multi-sport event in Sydney, Australia

III British Empire Games
- Host city: Sydney, Australia
- Nations: 15
- Athletes: 464
- Events: 71
- Opening: 5 February 1938
- Closing: 12 February 1938
- Opened by: John Loder, 2nd Baron Wakehurst
- Main venue: Sydney Cricket Ground

The 1938 British Empire Games were the third British Empire Games, the event that evolved to become the Commonwealth Games. Held in Sydney, Australia, from 5–12 February 1938, they were timed to coincide with Sydney's sesqui-centenary (150 years since the foundation of British settlement in Australia). Venues included the Sydney Cricket Ground (the main stadium), the North Sydney Olympic Pool and Henson Park. An estimated 40,000 people attended the opening ceremony. A men's residential village was established within the grounds of the Sydney Showground, while the female athletes were housed in hotels.

The star of the games was the Australian athlete Decima Norman, who won five gold medals in track and field. Margaret Dovey, later married to Australian prime minister Gough Whitlam, finished sixth in the 220 yards breaststroke.

Due to the onset of World War II, the games were not held again until 1950.

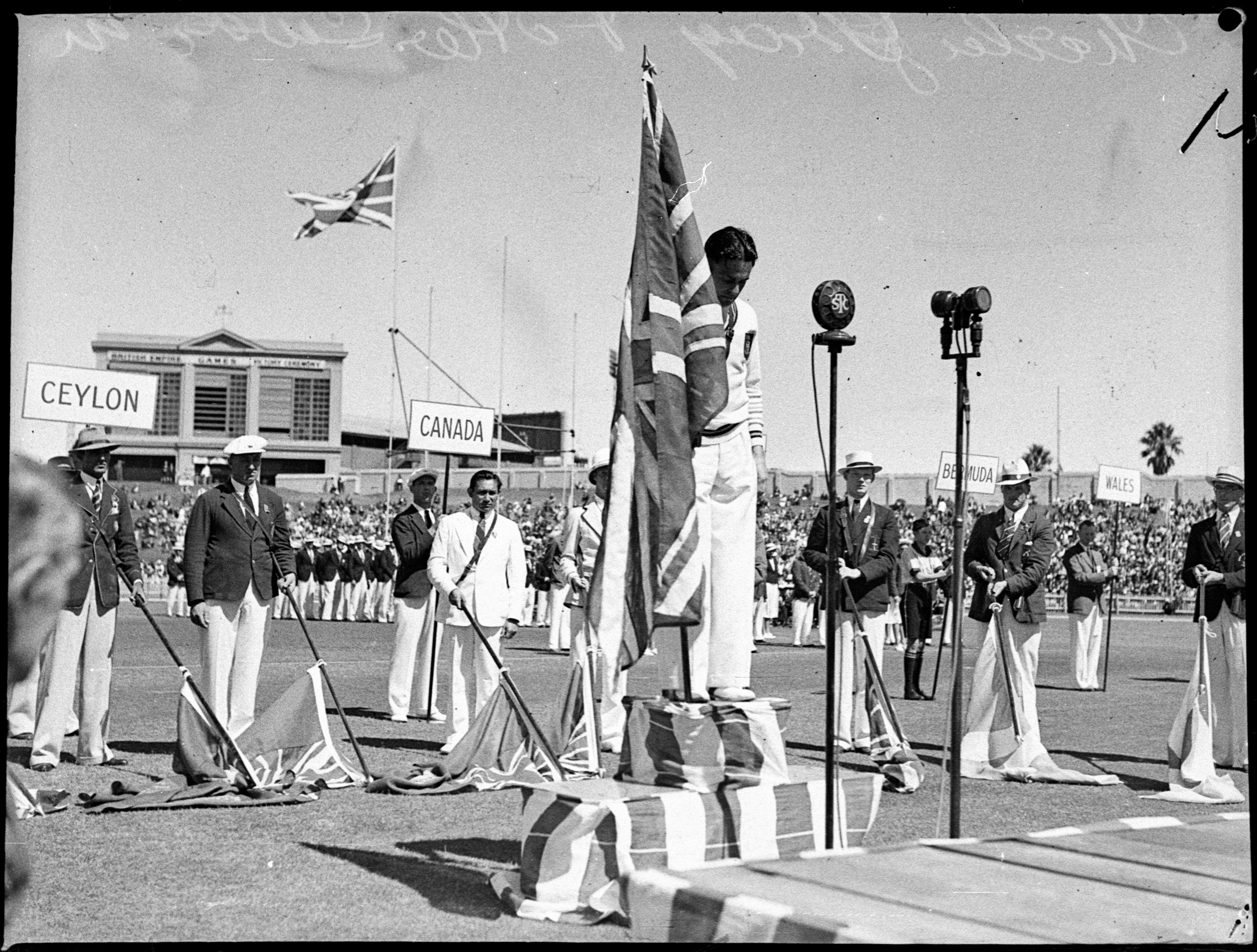
The opening ceremony

== Participating teams ==
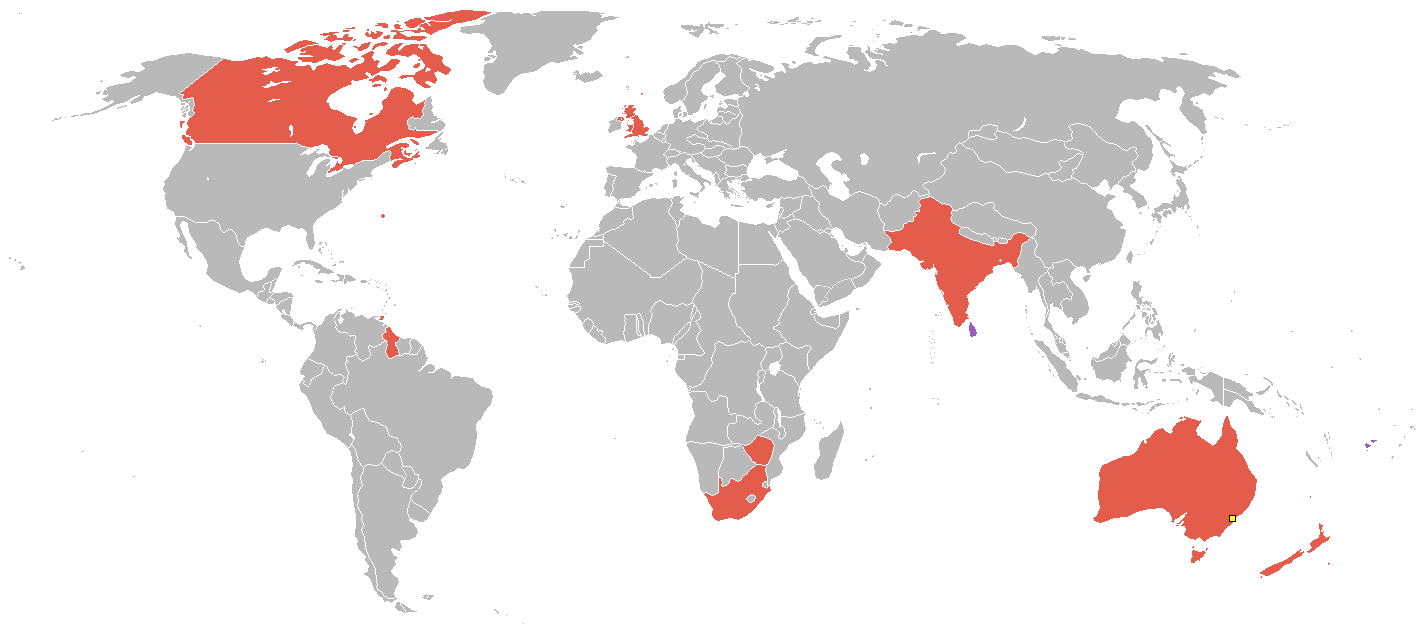
Countries that participated

- Australia (host)
- Bermuda
- British Guiana
- Canada
- Ceylon
- England
- Fiji
- India
- New Zealand
- Northern Ireland
- Scotland
- South Africa
- Southern Rhodesia
- Trinidad and Tobago
- Wales

== Medal table ==
* Host nation (Australia)

Rank	Nation	Gold	Silver	Bronze	Total
1	Australia*	25	19	22	66
2	England	15	15	10	40
3	Canada	13	16	15	44
4	South Africa	10	10	6	26
5	New Zealand	5	7	13	25
6	Wales	2	1	0	3
7	Ceylon	1	0	0	1
8	Scotland	0	2	3	5
9	British Guiana	0	1	0	1
10	Southern Rhodesia	0	0	2	2
Totals (10 entries)		71	71	71	213

== Sports ==
- Aquatics ()
  - Diving ()
  - Swimming ()
- Athletics ()
- Boxing ()
- Cycling ()
- Lawn bowls ()
- Rowing ()
- Wrestling ()

== Venues ==
Sporting

- Sydney Cricket Ground (athletics)
- Sydney Sports Ground (athletics)
- North Sydney Olympic Pool (swimming and diving)
- Henson Park, Marrickville (cycling, track)
- Centennial Park (cycling, road)
- Nepean River, Penrith (rowing)
- Rushcutters Bay Stadium (boxing and wrestling)
- Waverley Bowls Club, Waverley (lawn bowls)

Other

- Sydney Cricket Ground (opening ceremony)
- Sydney Showground (men's village)
- Lapstone Hill Hotel, Lapstone (rowing athletes)
- Centennial Park (closing ceremony)

== See also ==
- 2000 Summer Olympics at Sydney, Australia

Preceded by London	British Empire Games; Sydney; III British Empire Games	Succeeded by Auckland
