= Swimming at the 1936 Summer Olympics – Women's 100 metre freestyle =

Women's 100 metre freestyle at the Games of the XI Olympiad
- Venue: Olympiapark Schwimmstadion Berlin
- Date: 8 August 1936 (heats); 9 August 1936 (semifinals); 10 August 1936
- Competitors: 33 from 14 nations
- Winning time: 1.05.9 OR

Medalists
| 1st place, gold medalist(s) | | Rie Mastenbroek | Netherlands |
| 2nd place, silver medalist(s) | | Jeannette Campbell | Argentina |
| 3rd place, bronze medalist(s) | | Gisela Arendt | Germany |

The women's 100 metre freestyle was a swimming event held as part of the swimming at the 1936 Summer Olympics programme. It was the sixth appearance of the event, which was established in 1912. The competition was held from Saturday to Monday, 8 to 10 August 1936.

Thirty-three swimmers from 14 nations competed.

== Records ==
These were the standing world and Olympic records (in minutes) prior to the 1936 Summer Olympics.

| World record | 1:04.6 | (Netherlands) Willy den Ouden | Amsterdam (NED) | 27 February 1936 |
| Olympic record | 1:06.8 | (United States) Helene Madison | Los Angeles (USA) | 8 August 1932 |

Rie Mastenbroek set a new Olympic record in the first heat with 1 minute 06.4 seconds and equaled her time in the first semi-final. In the final she lowered the Olympic record to 1 minute 05.9 seconds.

== Results ==
=== Heats ===
Saturday 8 August 1936: The fastest three in each heat and the fastest fourth-placed from across the heats advanced to the semi-finals.

Heat 1

| Place | Swimmer | Time | Qual. |
|---|---|---|---|
| 1 | Rie Mastenbroek (NED) | 1:06.4 | Q OR |
| 2 | Gisela Arendt (GER) | 1:07.3 | Q |
| 3 | Katherine Rawls (USA) | 1:08.5 | Q |
| 4 | Phyllis Dewar (CAN) | 1:09.2 | q |
| 5 | Eva Arndt (DEN) | 1:10.1 | |
| 6 | Margery Hinton (GBR) | 1:13.0 | |
| 7 | Rei Takemura (JPN) | 1:14.6 | |
| 8 | Scylla Venâncio (BRA) | 1:15.1 | |

Heat 2

| Place | Swimmer | Time | Qual. |
|---|---|---|---|
| 1 | Willy den Ouden (NED) | 1:08.1 | Q |
| 2 | Evelyn de Lacy (AUS) | 1:08.5 | Q |
| 3 | Olive McKean (USA) | 1:09.3 | Q |
| 4 | Ilona Ács (HUN) | 1:12.7 | |
| 5 | Irene Pirie-Milton (CAN) | 1:12.8 | |
| 6 | Tsuneko Furuta (JPN) | 1:14.6 | |

Heat 3

| Place | Swimmer | Time | Qual. |
|---|---|---|---|
| 1 | Jeannette Campbell (ARG) | 1:06.8 | Q |
| 2 | Tini Wagner (NED) | 1:08.9 | Q |
| 3 | Piedade Coutinho (BRA) | 1:09.4 | Q |
| 4 | Elvi Svendsen (DEN) | 1:10.3 | |
| 5 | Inge Schmitz (GER) | 1:10.9 | |
| 6 | Vera Harsányi (HUN) | 1:11.5 | |
| 7 | Zilpha Grant (GBR) | 1:12.1 | |

Heat 4

| Place | Swimmer | Time | Qual. |
|---|---|---|---|
| 1 | Ragnhild Hveger (DEN) | 1:09.6 | Q |
| 2 | Kazue Kojima (JPN) | 1:11.0 | Q |
| 3 | Olive Wadham (GBR) | 1:11.5 | Q |
| 4 | Irma Schrameková (TCH) | 1:11.8 | |
| 5 | Kitty Mackay (AUS) | 1:13.8 | |
| 6 | Helena Salles (BRA) | 1:16.2 | |
| 7 | Yeung Sauking (ROC) | 1:22.2 | |

Heat 5

| Place | Swimmer | Time | Qual. |
|---|---|---|---|
| 1 | Bernice Lapp (USA) | 1:09.0 | Q |
| 2 | Magda Lenkei (HUN) | 1:09.9 | Q |
| 3 | Margaret Stone (CAN) | 1:10.0 | Q |
| 4 | Leni Lohmar (GER) | 1:10.3 | |
| 5 | Renée Blondeau (FRA) | 1:10.9 | |

=== Semifinals ===
Sunday 9 August 1936: The fastest three in each semi-final and the fastest fourth-placed from across the heats advanced to the final.

Semifinal 1

| Place | Swimmer | Time | Qual. |
|---|---|---|---|
| 1 | Rie Mastenbroek (NED) | 1:06.4 | Q =OR |
| 2 | Gisela Arendt (GER) | 1:07.2 | Q |
| 3 | Katherine Rawls (USA) | 1:08.5 | Q |
| 4 | Tini Wagner (NED) | 1:08.6 | q |
| 5 | Piedade Coutinho (BRA) | 1:09.6 | |
| 6 | Phyllis Dewar (CAN) | 1:09.6 | |
| 7 | Kazue Kojima (JPN) | 1:11.1 | |
| 8 | Magda Lenkei (HUN) | 1:12.1 | |

Semifinal 2

| Place | Swimmer | Time | Qual. |
|---|---|---|---|
| 1 | Jeannette Campbell (ARG) | 1:06.6 | Q |
| 2 | Willy den Ouden (NED) | 1:06.7 | Q |
| 3 | Olive McKean (USA) | 1:08.9 | Q |
| 4 | Bernice Lapp (USA) | 1:09.6 | |
| 5 | Evelyn de Lacy (AUS) | 1:10.0 | |
| 6 | Olive Wadham (GBR) | 1:12.0 | |
| 7 | Margaret Stone (CAN) | 1:12.8 | |
| 8 | Ragnhild Hveger (DEN) | 1:14.0 | |

=== Final ===
Monday 10 August 1936:

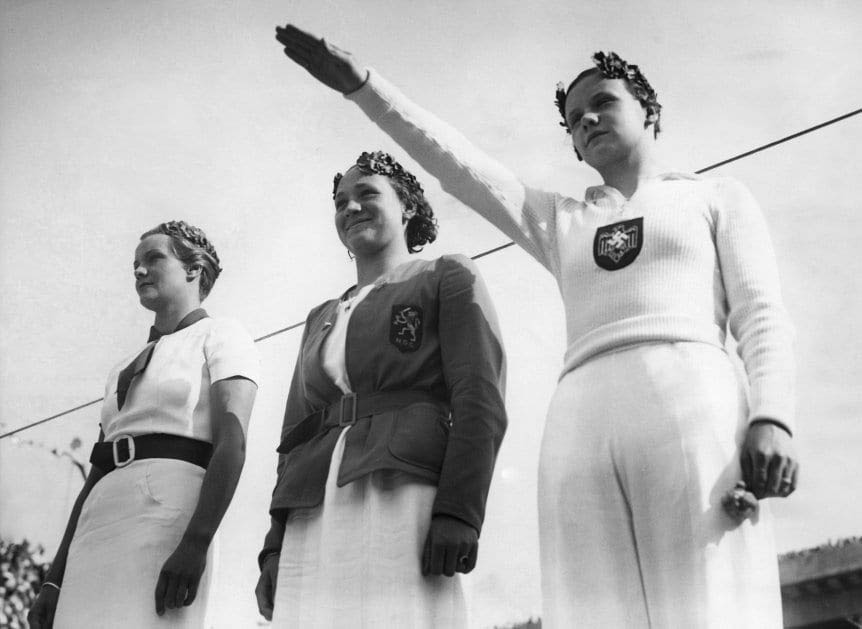
The podium with (fltr): Campbell, Mastenbroek, and Arendt

| Place | Swimmer | Time |
|---|---|---|
| 1 | Rie Mastenbroek (NED) | 1:05.9 OR |
| 2 | Jeannette Campbell (ARG) | 1:06.4 |
| 3 | Gisela Arendt (GER) | 1:06.6 |
| 4 | Willy den Ouden (NED) | 1:07.6 |
| 5 | Tini Wagner (NED) | 1:08.1 |
| 6 | Olive McKean (USA) | 1:08.4 |
| 7 | Katherine Rawls (USA) | 1:08.7 |
