= Hungary at the 1936 Summer Olympics =

- IOC code: HUN
- NOC: Hungarian Olympic Committee

in Berlin, Nazi Germany 1–16 August 1936
- Competitors: 216 (197 men and 19 women) in 21 sports
- Flag bearer: Péter Bácsalmási
- Medals Ranked 3rd: Gold 10 Silver 1 Bronze 5 Total 16

Summer Olympics appearances (overview)
- 1896; 1900; 1904; 1908; 1912; 1920; 1924; 1928; 1932; 1936; 1948; 1952; 1956; 1960; 1964; 1968; 1972; 1976; 1980; 1984; 1988; 1992; 1996; 2000; 2004; 2008; 2012; 2016; 2020; 2024

Other related appearances
- 1906 Intercalated Games

The Kingdom of Hungary competed at the 1936 Summer Olympics in Berlin, Germany. 216 competitors, 197 men and 19 women, took part in 104 events in 21 sports.

== Medalists ==
Medal	Name	Sport	Event	Date
Gold	Károly Kárpáti	Wrestling	Men's freestyle lightweight	4 August
Gold	Ödön Zombori	Wrestling	Men's freestyle bantamweight	5 August
Gold	Ilona Elek	Fencing	Women's foil	5 August
Gold	Ibolya Csák	Athletics	Women's high jump	9 August
Gold	Márton Lőrincz	Wrestling	Men's Greco-Roman bantamweight	9 August
Gold	Ferenc Csik	Swimming	Men's 100 metre freestyle	9 August
Gold	Aladár Gerevich; Tibor Berczelly; Pál Kovács; Endre Kabos; László Rajcsányi; Imre Rajczy	Fencing	Men's team sabre	13 August
Gold	Imre Harangi	Boxing	Men's lightweight	15 August
Gold	Endre Kabos	Fencing	Men's sabre	15 August
Gold	Hungary men's national water polo team: Mihály Bozsi; Jenö Brandi; Mihály Bozsi; Olivér Halassy; Kálmán Hazai; Márton Homonnai; György Kutasi; István Molnár; János Németh; Miklós Sárkány; Sándor Tarics	Water polo	Men's tournament	15 August
Silver	Ralph Berzsenyi	Shooting	Men's 50 metre rifle prone	8 August
Bronze	József Palotás	Wrestling	Men's Greco-Roman middleweight	9 August
Bronze	Árpád Lengyel; Oszkár Abay-Nemes; Ödön Gróf; Ferenc Csik	Swimming	Men's 4 × 200 metre freestyle relay	11 August
Bronze	Margit Csillik; Judit Tóth; Margit Nagy-Sándor; Gabriella Mészáros; Eszter Voit; Olga Törös; Ilona Madary; Margit Kalocsai	Gymnastics	Women's artistic team all-around	12 August
Bronze	Aladár Gerevich	Fencing	Men's sabre	15 August
Bronze	József von Platthy	Equestrian	Men's individual jumping	16 August

Default sort order: Medal, Date, Name

Medals by sport
Sport	1st place, gold medalist(s)	2nd place, silver medalist(s)	3rd place, bronze medalist(s)	Total
Fencing	3	0	1	4
Wrestling	3	0	1	4
Swimming	1	0	1	2
Athletics	1	0	0	1
Boxing	1	0	0	1
Water polo	1	0	0	1
Shooting	0	1	0	1
Equestrian	0	0	1	1
Gymnastics	0	0	1	1
Total	10	1	5	16

Medals by gender
Gender	1st place, gold medalist(s)	2nd place, silver medalist(s)	3rd place, bronze medalist(s)	Total
Male	8	1	4	13
Female	2	0	1	3
Total	10	1	5	16

=== Multiple medalists ===
The following competitors won multiple medals at the 1936 Olympic Games.

Name	Medal	Sport	Event
Endre Kabos	Gold; Gold	Fencing	Men's team sabre Men's sabre
Aladár Gerevich	Gold; Bronze	Fencing	Men's team sabre Men's sabre
Ferenc Csik	Gold; Bronze	Swimming	Men's 100 m freestyle Men's 4×200 m freestyle relay

== Cycling ==
Eight cyclists, all men, represented Hungary in 1936.

Individual road race

- János Bognár
- István Liszkay
- István Adorján
- Károly Nemes-Nótás

Team road race

- János Bognár
- István Liszkay
- István Adorján
- Károly Nemes-Nótás

Sprint

- Imre Győrffy

Time trial

- László Orczán

Tandem

- Miklós Németh
- Ferenc Pelvássy

Team pursuit

- István Liszkay
- Miklós Németh
- László Orczán
- Ferenc Pelvássy

== Diving ==
Men

Athlete	Event	Final	
Athlete	Event	Points	Rank
László Hidvégi	3 m springboard	107.49	18
László Hódi	3 m springboard	85.42	22
László Hidvégi	10 m platform	80.14	18
László Hódi	10 m platform	89.25	11

== Fencing ==
19 fencers, 16 men and 3 women, represented Hungary in 1936.

Men's foil

- Béla Bay
- József Hátszeghy
- Lajos Maszlay

Men's team foil

- József Hátszeghy, Lajos Maszlay, Aladár Gerevich, Béla Bay, Ottó Hátszeghy, Antal Zirczy

Men's épée

- Béla Bay
- Rezső von Bartha
- Pál Dunay

Men's team épée

- Jenő Borovszki, Tibor Székelyhidy, Béla Bay, Pál Dunay, István Bezegh-Huszágh

Men's sabre

- Endre Kabos
- Aladár Gerevich
- László Rajcsányi

Men's team sabre

- Aladár Gerevich, Tibor Berczelly, Pál Kovács, Endre Kabos, László Rajcsányi, Imre Rajczy

Women's foil

- Ilona Elek-Schacherer
- Ilona Vargha
- Erna Bogen-Bogáti

== Field hockey ==
=== Preliminary round ===
Pos	Team	Pld	W	D	L	GF	GA	GD	Pts	Qualification
1	India	3	3	0	0	20	0	+20	6	Semi-finals
2	Japan	3	2	0	1	8	11	−3	4	
3	Hungary	3	1	0	2	4	8	−4	2	
4	United States	3	0	0	3	2	15	−13	0	

Source: TheSports.org

5 August 1936
18:00

India	4–0	Hungary
Singh 25', 39', ?'; Jaffar	Report

Umpires:
Jaap Quarles Van Ufford (NED)
A. Demaurex (SUI)

8 August 1936
18:00

Japan	3–1	Hungary
	Report

10 August 1936
18:00

Hungary	3–1	United States
	Report

== Modern pentathlon ==
Three male pentathlete represented Hungary in 1936.

- Nándor von Orbán
- Rezső von Bartha
- Lajos von Sipeki-von Balás

== Rowing ==
Hungary had 23 rowers participate in seven out of seven rowing events in 1936.

Men's single sculls

- László Kozma

Men's double sculls

- Károly Bazini
- Egon Bazini

Men's coxless pair

- Károly Győry
- Tibor Mamusich

Men's coxed pair

- Károly Győry
- Tibor Mamusich
- László Molnár (cox)

Men's coxless four

- Ferenc Dobos
- Frigyes Pabsz
- Tibor Vadai
- Gyula Halmay

Men's coxed four

- Miklós Mihó
- Vilmos Éden
- Ákos Inotay
- Alajos Szilassy
- László Molnár (cox)

Men's eight

- Pál Domonkos
- Sándor von Korompay
- Hugó Ballya
- Imre Kapossy
- Antal Szendey
- Gábor Alapy
- Frigyes Hollósi
- László Szabó
- Ervin Kereszthy (cox)

== Shooting ==
Eight shooters represented Hungary in 1936.

25 m rapid fire pistol

- László Vadnay
- Jakab Kőszegi
- Dezső von Zirthy

50 m pistol

- Sándor Tölgyesi
- Bertalan Zsótér

50 m rifle, prone

- Ralph Berzsenyi
- Zoltán Soós-Ruszka Hradetzky
- Tibor Tary

== Swimming ==
Men

Ranks given are within the heat.

Athlete	Event	Heat		Semifinal		Final	
Athlete	Event	Time	Rank	Time	Rank	Time	Rank
Oszkár Abay-Nemes	100 m freestyle	1:00.2	2 Q	1:01.1	7	Did not advance	
Ferenc Csik	100 m freestyle	58.3	2 Q	58.1	2 Q	57.6	1st place, gold medalist(s)
Ödön Gróf	100 m freestyle	1:01.3	3	Did not advance			
István Angyal	400 m freestyle	5:20.9	6	Did not advance			
Ödön Gróf	400 m freestyle	4:59.4	1 Q	5:01.9	7	Did not advance	
Árpád Lengyel	400 m freestyle	4:57.7	4	Did not advance			
István Angyal	1500 m freestyle			Did not advance			
György Erdélyi	100 m backstroke	1:14.7	5	Did not advance			
Elemér Gombos	100 m backstroke	1:12.4	4	Did not advance			
Árpád Lengyel	100 m backstroke	1:15.2	5	Did not advance			
Árpád Lengyel; Oszkár Abay-Nemes; Ödön Gróf; Ferenc Csik	4 × 200 m freestyle relay	—N/a		9:20.8	2 Q	9:12.3	3rd place, bronze medalist(s)

Women

Ranks given are within the heat.

Athlete	Event	Heat		Semifinal		Final	
Athlete	Event	Time	Rank	Time	Rank	Time	Rank
Ilona Ács	100 m freestyle	1:12.7	4	Did not advance			
Vera Harsányi	100 m freestyle	1:11.5	6	Did not advance			
Magda Lenkei	100 m freestyle	1:09.9	2 Q	1:12.1	8	Did not advance	
Ágnes Bíró	400 m freestyle	6:14.3	4	Did not advance			
Vera Harsányi	400 m freestyle	6:14.7	5	Did not advance			
Borbála Sóthy	400 m freestyle	6:14.8	2 Q	6:11.2	7	Did not advance	
Irén Győrffy	100 m backstroke	1:25.8	6	Did not advance			
Ilona Ács; Ágnes Bíró; Vera Harsányi; Magda Lenkei	4 × 100 m freestyle relay	—N/a		4:50.6	4 q	4:48.0	=4
