= Netherlands at the 1936 Summer Olympics =

- Flag of the Netherlands
- IOC code: NED
- NOC: Dutch Olympic Committee

in Berlin
- Competitors: 165 (145 men and 20 women) in 15 sports
- Flag bearer: Rein de Waal
- Medals Ranked 9th: Gold 6 Silver 4 Bronze 7 Total 17

Summer Olympics appearances (overview)
- 1900; 1904; 1908; 1912; 1920; 1924; 1928; 1932; 1936; 1948; 1952; 1956; 1960; 1964; 1968; 1972; 1976; 1980; 1984; 1988; 1992; 1996; 2000; 2004; 2008; 2012; 2016; 2020; 2024

Other related appearances
- 1906 Intercalated Games

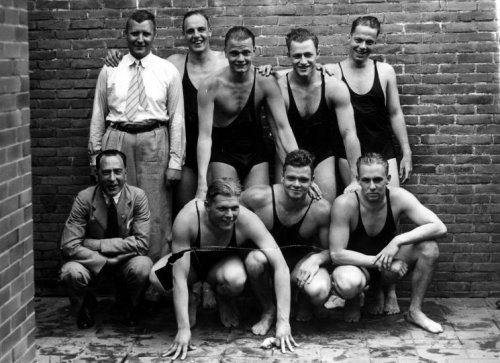
The Dutch water polo team

The Netherlands competed at the 1936 Summer Olympics in Berlin, Germany. 165 competitors, 145 men and 20 women, took part in 75 events in 15 sports.

== Medalists ==
=== Gold ===
- Arie van Vliet — Cycling, Men's 1.000m Time Trial
- Rie Mastenbroek — Swimming, Women's 100m Freestyle
- Rie Mastenbroek — Swimming, Women's 400m Freestyle
- Nida Senff — Swimming, Women's 100m Backstroke
- Willy den Ouden, Rie Mastenbroek, Jopie Selbach, and Tini Wagner — Swimming, Women's 4 × 100 m Freestyle Relay
- Daan Kagchelland — Sailing, Men's Monotype Class

=== Silver ===
- Arie van Vliet — Cycling, Men's 1.000m Sprint (Scratch)
- Bernhard Leene and Hendrik Ooms — Cycling, Men's 2.000m Tandem
- Jan de Bruine, Johan Greter, and Henri van Schaik — Equestrian, Jumping Team
- Rie Mastenbroek — Swimming, Women's 100m Backstroke

=== Bronze ===
- Tinus Osendarp — Athletics, Men's 100 metres
- Tinus Osendarp — Athletics, Men's 200 metres
- Jaap Kraaier — Canoeing, Men's K1 1.000m Kayak Singles
- Nico Tates and Wim van der Kroft — Canoeing, Men's K2 1.000m Kayak Pairs
- Kees Wijdekop and Piet Wijdekop — Canoeing, Men's F2 10.000m Folding Kayak Pairs
- Henk de Looper, Jan de Looper, Agathon de Roos, Rein de Waal, Pieter Gunning, Carl Heijbroek, Henri Schnitger, René Sparenberg, Ernst van den Berg, Rudolf van der Haar, Antoine van Lierop, and Max Westerkamp — Field Hockey, Men's Team Competition
- Willem de Vries Lentsch and Bob Maas — Sailing, Men's Star

== Cycling ==
Eleven cyclists, all men, represented the Netherlands in 1936.

Individual road race

- Nico van Gageldonk
- René van Hove
- Gerrit Schulte
- Philippus Vethaak

Team road race

- Nico van Gageldonk
- René van Hove
- Gerrit Schulte
- Philippus Vethaak

Sprint

- Arie van Vliet

Time trial

- Arie van Vliet

Tandem

- Bernard Leene
- Henk Ooms

Team pursuit

- Chris Kropman
- Adrie Zwartepoorte
- Ben van der Voort
- Gerrit van Wees

== Diving ==
Men

Athlete	Event	Final	
Athlete	Event	Points	Rank
Hans Haasmann	3 m springboard	111.44	=15

== Fencing ==
Eleven fencers, ten men and one woman, represented the Netherlands in 1936.

Men's foil

- Paul Kunze

Men's épée

- Cornelis Weber
- Willem Driebergen
- Nicolaas van Hoorn

Men's team épée

- Nicolaas van Hoorn, Jan Schepers (1897–1997), Willem Driebergen, Cornelis Weber

Men's sabre

- Pieter van Wieringen
- Frans Mosman
- Antonius Montfoort

Men's team sabre

- Ate Faber, Antonius Montfoort, Frans Mosman, Pieter van Wieringen, Jacob Schriever

Women's foil

- Catharina Maria van der Klaauw

== Field hockey ==
Men's Team Competition

- Preliminary Round (Group C)

- Defeated France (3-1)
- Defeated Switzerland (4-1)
- Tied with Belgium (2-2)

- Semi Finals

- Lost to Germany (0-3)

- Third Place Match

- Defeated France (4-3) → Bronze Medal

- Team Roster

- Henk de Looper
- Jan de Looper
- Agathon de Roos
- Rein de Waal
- Pieter Gunning
- Carl Heijbroek
- Henri Schnitger
- René Sparenberg
- Ernst van den Berg
- Rudolf van der Haar
- Antoine van Lierop
- Max Westerkamp

== Modern pentathlon ==
Three male pentathletes represented the Netherlands in 1936.

- Alexander van Geen
- Josephus Serré
- Johannes van der Horst

== Rowing ==
The Netherlands had eleven rowers participate in five out of seven rowing events in 1936.

Men's single sculls

- Hans ten Houten

Men's coxless pair

- Jan Kramer
- Willem Jens

Men's coxed pair

- Karel Hardeman
- Ernst de Jonge
- Hans van Walsem (cox)

Men's coxless four

- Mak Schoorl
- Flip Regout
- Hotse Bartlema
- Simon de Wit

Men's coxed four

- Mak Schoorl
- Hotse Bartlema
- Flip Regout
- Simon de Wit
- Gerard Hallie (cox)

== Shooting ==
Four shooters represented the Netherlands in 1936.

25 m rapid fire pistol

- Dirk van den Bosch

50 m rifle, prone

- Jan Hendrik Brussaard
- Christiaan Both
- Tieleman Vuurman

== Swimming ==
Men

Ranks given are within the heat.

Athlete	Event	Heat		Semifinal		Final	
Athlete	Event	Time	Rank	Time	Rank	Time	Rank
Sjoerd Mooi Wilten	100 m freestyle	1:03.4	6	Did not advance			
Piet Stam	100 m freestyle	1:01.3	4	Did not advance			
Piet Stam	400 m freestyle	5:07.8	3	Did not advance			
Piet Metman	100 m backstroke	1:13.7	3 Q	1:14.1	8	Did not advance	
Stans Scheffer	100 m backstroke	1:13.6	4	Did not advance			

Women

Ranks given are within the heat.

Athlete	Event	Heat		Semifinal		Final	
Athlete	Event	Time	Rank	Time	Rank	Time	Rank
Willy den Ouden	100 m freestyle	1:08.1	1 Q	1:06.7	2 Q	1:07.6	4
Rie Mastenbroek	100 m freestyle	1:06.4 OR	1 Q	1:06.4	1 =OR	1:05.9 OR	1st place, gold medalist(s)
Tini Wagner	100 m freestyle	1:08.9	2 Q	1:08.6	4 q	1:08.1	5
Rie Mastenbroek	400 m freestyle	5:38.6	1 Q	5:40.3	1 Q	5:26.4 OR	1st place, gold medalist(s)
Ans Timmermans	400 m freestyle	5:42.5	2 Q	5:49.4	6	Did not advance	
Tini Wagner	400 m freestyle	5:57.5	1 Q	5:45.9	4 q	5:46.0	8
Truus Kerkmeester	100 m backstroke	1:21.2	2 Q	1:21.3	4	Did not advance	
Rie Mastenbroek	100 m backstroke	1:22.0	2 Q	1:19.1	1 Q	1:19.2	2nd place, silver medalist(s)
Nida Senff	100 m backstroke	1:16.6 OR	1 Q	1:17.1	1 Q	1:18.9	1st place, gold medalist(s)
Jenny Kastein	200 m breaststroke	3:07.8	2 Q	3:09.2	2 Q	3:12.8	7
Jo Stroomberg	200 m breaststroke	3:22.5	5	Did not advance			
Jopie Waalberg	200 m breaststroke	3:10.4	3 Q	3:09.7	4 Q	3:09.5	=4
Jopie Selbach; Tini Wagner; Willy den Ouden; Rie Mastenbroek	4 × 100 m freestyle relay	—N/a		4:38.1	1 Q	4:36.0 OR	1st place, gold medalist(s)
