= Swimming at the 1936 Summer Olympics – Women's 4 × 100 metre freestyle relay =

Women's 4 × 100 metre freestyle relay at the Games of the XI Olympiad
- Venue: Olympiapark Schwimmstadion Berlin
- Date: 12 August 1936 (heats); 14 August 1936 (final)
- Competitors: 38 from 9 nations
- Teams: 9
- Winning time: 4:36.0 OR

Medalists
1st place, gold medalist(s)		Jopie Selbach, Tini Wagner, Willy den Ouden, Rie Mastenbroek	Netherlands
2nd place, silver medalist(s)		Ruth Halbsguth, Leni Lohmar, Ingeborg Schmitz, Gisela Arendt	Germany
3rd place, bronze medalist(s)		Katherine Rawls, Bernice Lapp, Mavis Freeman, Olive McKean	United States

The women's 4 × 100 metre freestyle relay was a swimming event held as part of the swimming at the 1936 Summer Olympics programme. It was the sixth appearance of the event, which was established in 1912. The competition was held on Wednesday and Friday, 12 and 14 August 1936.

The United States and Germany both replaced one swimmer between the semi-finals and the final. Thirty-eight swimmers from nine nations competed.

Note: The International Olympic Committee medal database shows only these swimmers as medalists. Ursula Pollack swam for Germany in the semi-finals but is not credited with a silver medal. Also the American Elizabeth Ryan who swam in the semi-finals is not listed as bronze medalist.

== Records ==
These were the standing world and Olympic records (in minutes) prior to the 1936 Summer Olympics.

World record	4:32.8	(Netherlands) Jopie Selbach (Netherlands) Rie Mastenbroek (Netherlands) Tini Wagner (Netherlands) Willy den Ouden	Rotterdam (NED)	24 May 1936
Olympic record	4:38.0	(United States) Josephine McKim (United States) Helen Johns (United States) Eleanor Saville (United States) Helene Madison	Los Angeles (USA)	12 August 1932

In the final the Netherlands set a new Olympic record with 4:36.0 minutes.

== Results ==
=== Semifinals ===
Wednesday, 12 August 1936: The fastest three in each semi-final and the fastest fourth-placed advanced to the final.

Semifinal 1

Place	Swimmers	Time	Qual.
1	Mavis Freeman, Bernice Lapp, Olive McKean, and Elizabeth Ryan (USA)	4:47.1	QQ
2	Zilpha Grant, Edna Hughes, Margaret Jeffery, and Olive Wadham (GBR)	4:47.2	QQ
3	Phyllis Dewar, Mary McConkey, Irene Pirie-Milton, and Margaret Stone (CAN)	4:49.7	QQ
4	Ilona Ács, Ágnes Bíró, Vera Harsányi, and Magda Lenkei (HUN)	4:50.6	qq
5	Roma Wagner, Franziska Mally, Grete Ittlinger, and Elli von Kropiwnicki (AUT)	5:16.6	

Semifinal 2

Place	Swimmers	Time	Qual.
1	Rie Mastenbroek, Willy den Ouden, Jopie Selbach, and Tini Wagner (NED)	4:38.1	QQ
2	Ruth Halbsguth, Leni Lohmar, Ursula Pollack, and Ingeborg Schmitz (GER)	4:40.5	QQ
3	Eva Arndt, Tove Bruunstrøm, Ragnhild Hveger, and Elvi Svendsen (DEN)	4:46.2	QQ
4	Tsuneko Furuta, Kazue Kojima, Hatsuko Morioka, and Rei Takemura (JPN)	4:58.1	NR

=== Final ===
Friday, 14 August 1936:

Place	Swimmers	Time
1	Jopie Selbach, Tini Wagner, Willy den Ouden, and Rie Mastenbroek (NED)	4:36.0 OR
2	Ruth Halbsguth, Leni Lohmar, Ingeborg Schmitz, and Gisela Arendt (GER)	4:36.8
3	Katherine Rawls, Bernice Lapp, Mavis Freeman, and Olive McKean (USA)	4:40.2
4	Ilona Ács, Ágnes Bíró, Vera Harsányi, and Magda Lenkei (HUN)	4:48.0
4	Mary McConkey, Irene Pirie-Milton, Margaret Stone, and Phyllis Dewar (CAN)	4:48.0
6	Margaret Jeffery, Zilpha Grant, Edna Hughes, and Olive Wadham (GBR)	4:51.0
7	Ragnhild Hveger, Tove Bruunstrøm, Elvi Svendsen, and Eva Arndt (DEN)	4:51.4
