= Swimming at the 1936 Summer Olympics =

Swimming at the Games of the XI Olympiad
- Venue: Olympiapark Schwimmstadion Berlin
- Dates: 8–15 August 1936
- No. of events: 11
- Competitors: 248 from 29 nations

At the 1936 Summer Olympics in Berlin, eleven swimming events were contested, six for men and five for women. The competitions were held from Saturday August 8, 1936 to Saturday August 15, 1936. There was a total of 248 participants from 29 countries competing.

== Medal table ==
Rank	Nation	Gold	Silver	Bronze	Total
1	Japan	4	2	5	11
2	Netherlands	4	1	0	5
3	United States	2	3	3	8
4	Hungary	1	0	1	2
5	Germany	0	3	1	4
6	Denmark	0	1	1	2
7	Argentina	0	1	0	1
Totals (7 entries)		11	11	11	33

== Medal summary ==
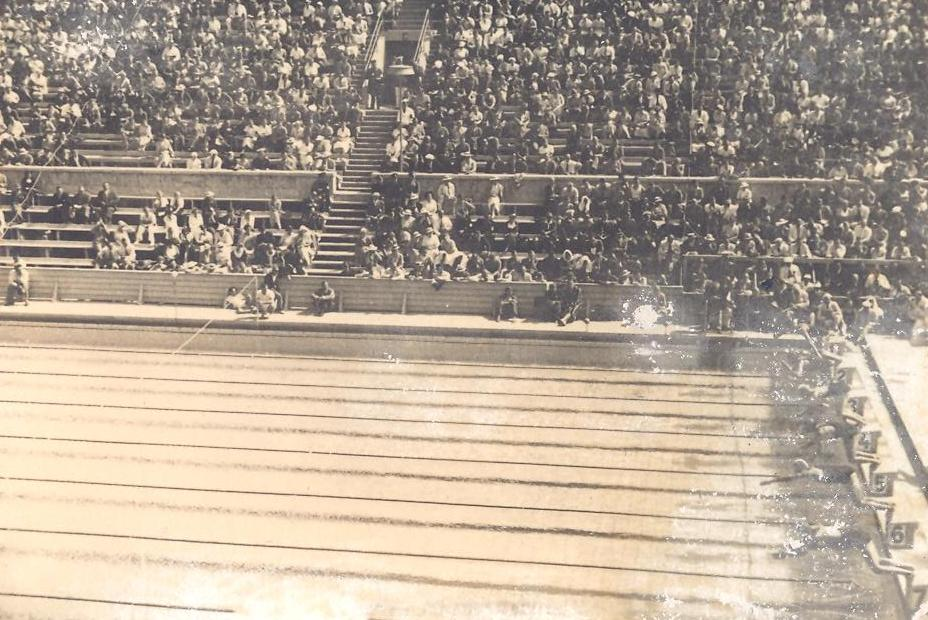
Swimming at the 1936 Summer Olympics in Berlin

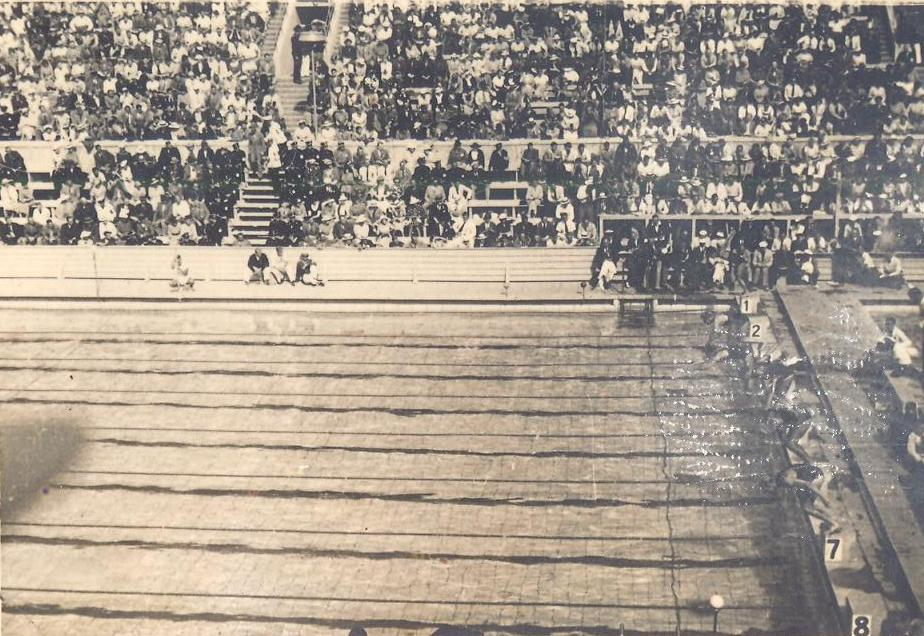
Swimming at the 1936 Summer Olympics in Berlin

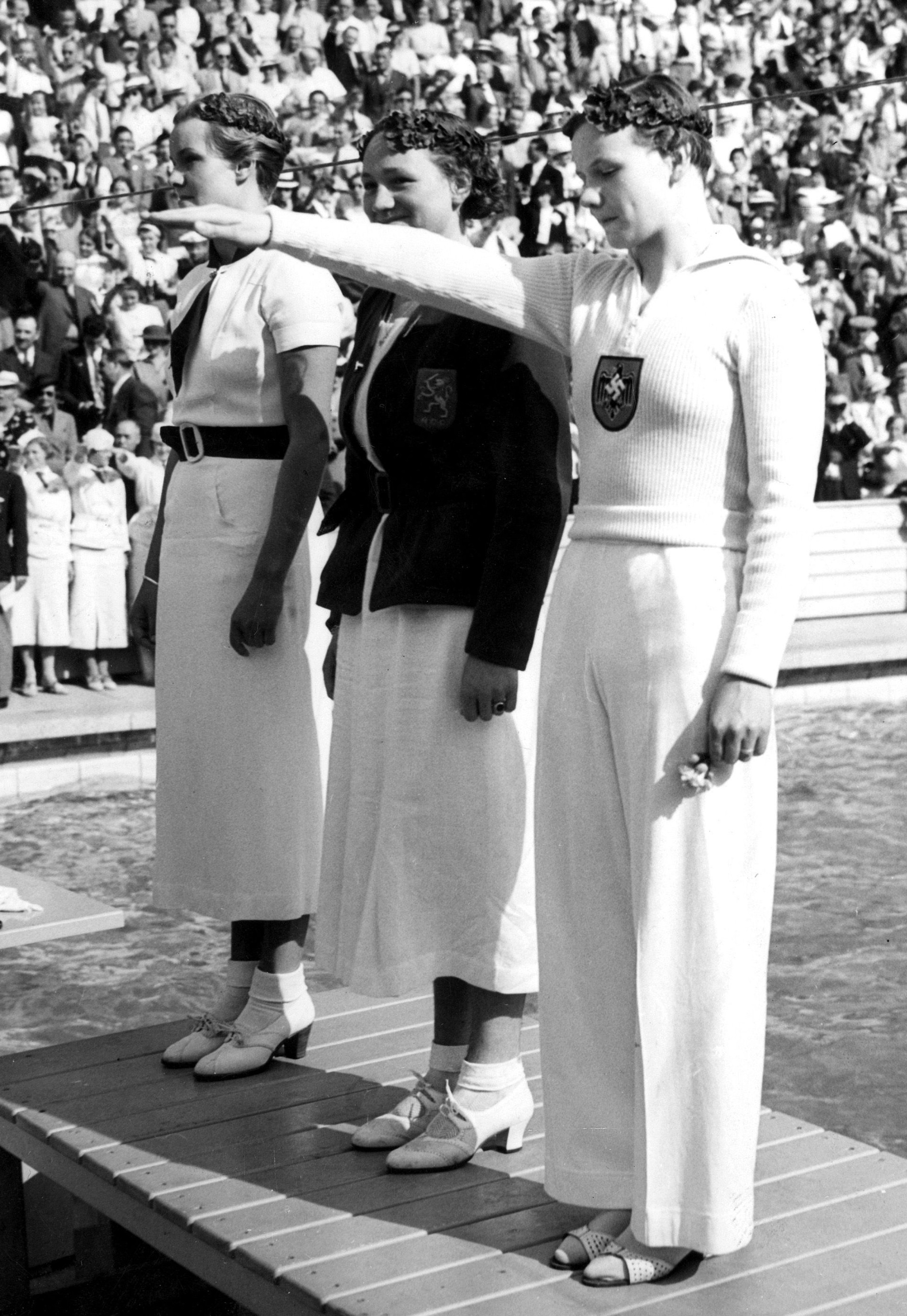
The podium of 100 m freestyle at the 1936 Olympic Games

=== Men's events ===
Games	Gold	Silver	Bronze
100 m freestyle	Ferenc Csik; Hungary	Masanori Yusa; Japan	Shigeo Arai; Japan
400 m freestyle	Jack Medica; United States	Shunpei Uto; Japan	Shozo Makino; Japan
1500 m freestyle	Noboru Terada; Japan	Jack Medica; United States	Shunpei Uto; Japan
100 m backstroke	Adolph Kiefer; United States	Al Vande Weghe; United States	Masaji Kiyokawa; Japan
200 m breaststroke	Tetsuo Hamuro; Japan	Erwin Sietas; Germany	Reizo Koike; Japan
4 × 200 m freestyle relay	Japan; Shigeo Arai; Shigeo Sugiura; Masaharu Taguchi; Masanori Yusa	United States; Ralph Flanagan; John Macionis; Jack Medica; Paul Wolf	Hungary; Oszkár Abay-Nemes; Ferenc Csik; Ödön Gróf; Árpád Lengyel

=== Women's events ===
Games	Gold	Silver	Bronze
100 m freestyle	Rie Mastenbroek; Netherlands	Jeannette Campbell; Argentina	Gisela Arendt; Germany
400 m freestyle	Rie Mastenbroek; Netherlands	Ragnhild Hveger; Denmark	Lenore Wingard; United States
100 m backstroke	Nida Senff; Netherlands	Rie Mastenbroek; Netherlands	Alice Bridges; United States
200 m breaststroke	Hideko Maehata; Japan	Martha Genenger; Germany	Inge Sørensen; Denmark
4 × 100 m freestyle relay	Netherlands; Rie Mastenbroek; Willy den Ouden; Jopie Selbach; Tini Wagner	Germany; Gisela Arendt; Ruth Halbsguth; Leni Lohmar; Ingeborg Schmitz	United States; Mavis Freeman; Bernice Lapp; Olive McKean; Katherine Rawls

== Participating nations ==
248 swimmers from 29 nations competed.

- Argentina (1)
- Australia (5)
- Austria (8)
- Bermuda (5)
- Bolivia (1)
- Brazil (16)
- Canada (14)
- Chile (4)
- Republic of China (2)
- Czechoslovakia (3)

- Denmark (18)
- Egypt (5)
- Estonia (2)
- Finland (2)
- France (8)
- Germany (24)
- Great Britain (20)
- Greece (5)
- Hungary (13)
- Japan (21)

- Luxembourg (4)
- Netherlands (14)
- Peru (3)
- Philippines (5)
- Poland (4)
- Sweden (5)
- Switzerland (4)
- United States (28)
- Yugoslavia (4)
