= Roma Wagner =

Austrian swimmer

Personal information
- Born: 21 July 1912
- Died: 4 June 1990 (aged 77)

Sport
- Sport: Swimming

Roma Wagner (21 July 1912 – 4 June 1990) was an Austrian backstroke and freestyle swimmer. She competed in two events at the 1936 Summer Olympics. Wagner was in the women's 4 × 100 metre freestyle relay with Grete Ittlinger, Franziska Mally and Elli von Kropiwnicki and they failed to make the first three, and the finals, by coming last in the first semi-final.
