= Elizabeth Ryan (swimmer) =

American swimmer (1923–1998)

- Ryan posed wearing 1936 Olympic blazer

Personal information
- Full name: Elizabeth Mary Ryan
- Nickname: "Pat"
- National team: United States
- Born: January 4, 1923 New York, New York, U.S.
- Died: May 1998 (aged 75) Brooklyn, New York, U.S.
- Education: Marymount Academy (1940); College Prep Boarding School

Sport
- Sport: Swimming
- Strokes: Freestyle
- Club: Women's Swimming Assoc. (WSA); New York, New York
- Coach: Louis Handley (WSA); Ray Daughters ('36 Olympics)

Elizabeth "Pat" Mary Ryan (January 4, 1923 – May 1998) was an American competition swimmer who competed for the Women's Swimming Association of New York, and represented the United States at the 1936 Summer Olympics in Berlin, Germany, in a preliminary heat of the women's 4×100-meter freestyle relay. As she swam only in the preliminary heat of the relay and not the final, under the 1936 Olympic swimming rules, she did not receive a medal.

== Early life and family ==
WSA Coach Louis Handley in 1907

Ryan was born January 4, 1923, in Manhattan, New York, to father Dr. William J. Ryan and mother Elizabeth Ryan. Elizabeth's father, a tuberculosis and pulmonary disease specialist, operated, managed, and was a founder of the Sanatorium at New York's Summit Park in Pomona. Elizabeth's sister, Helen, would become a skilled swimmer and later assist Elizabeth judging a few swim meets as would her sister Marita. Elizabeth spent her early years in Pomona, New York, about 30 miles north of greater New York City, and was an elementary school graduate of St. Joseph's, a parochial school, around the age of 12. Growing up in Pomona's Rockland County, she started swimming at age five, and later swam in local area pools and a few nearby lakes. She was a frequent visitor to Bardonia, New York's Monterey Pool. By age nine, she was swimming for the strong program of the Women's Swimming Association (WSA) of New York where she was coached by Louis Handley under whose management her skills greatly advanced.

Gaining national attention, at 13, she won the Junior National title for the 440-yard distance at New York's Jones Beach in the summer of 1936.

== 1936 Olympic trials ==
In the 1936 trials in Astoria, New York, Ryan came in sixth in the 100-meter freestyle, qualifying her for the U.S. Olympic Women's Olympic relay team. She would later travel on the U.S.S. Manhattan to the Olympic games in Berlin.

== 1936 Berlin Olympics ==
As the youngest women's Olympic participant at 13, Ryan swam for the third-place U.S. team in the preliminary heats of the women's 4×100-meter freestyle relay, helping the Americans qualify for the event final. At the 1936 Olympics, Ryan was managed by U.S. Olympic women's Head Coach Ray Daughters. In her Olympic 4x100 preliminary heat, Elizabeth swam the leadoff leg with Bernice Lapp, Mavis Freeman and Olive McKean. In the finals for the event, the U.S. women's 4x100 meter team placed third winning the bronze medal, with Katherine Rawls replacing Ryan as the first relay swimmer. In a strong finals field, the women's team from Holland captured the gold medal setting an Olympic record of 4:36.0. Germany took the silver with a time of 4:36.8 and the American finals team swam a 4:40.2 for the bronze.

=== Post Olympic swimming highlights ===
After the 1936 Olympics, Ryan won both the indoor and outdoor competitions at the A.A.U.'s Metropolitan and New York State 100-yard freestyle event. She later swam in a 300-yard medley relay that established new indoor American record for a short course pool. In 1937, she won the 100-meter freestyle event as part of San Francisco's National Championships with a time of 1:08, a meet record, and just short of a national record.

Continuing to swim, in 1938, she captured the 100-meter freestyle championship again in Metropolitan and New York State AAU Championships. In both 1939, and 1940, she again captured the 100-meter freestyle New York Metropolitan title.

Ryan may have been a likely candidate for the 1940 Women's Olympic team, but they were not held due to World War 2.

=== Education ===
Ryan was a 1940 graduate of Marymount Academy, now known as Marymount College, a private preparatory boarding school in Tarrytown, New York.

She stayed active in swimming and the swimming community after the Olympics, and made herself available for charity functions, while coaching the occasional swim meet.

In May of 1998, at the age of 75, suffering from a muscular-related illness, Ryan died in Brooklyn, Queens, New York. She spent many of her post-swimming years living in the greater Brooklyn area.
