= Mavis Freeman =

American swimmer (1918–1988)

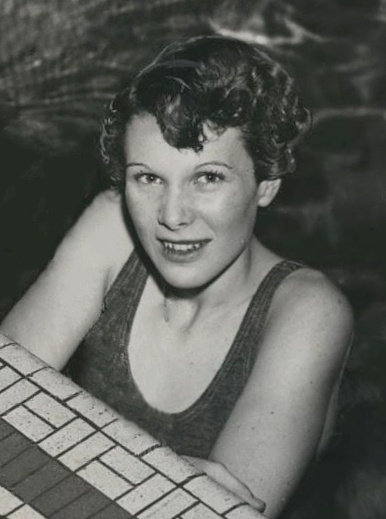
- Freeman in 1935

Personal information
- Full name: Mavis Anne Freeman
- National team: United States
- Born: November 7, 1918 Brooklyn, New York, U.S.
- Died: October 1988 (aged 69)
- Height: 5 ft 7.5 in (1.715 m)
- Weight: 134 lb (61 kg)

Sport
- Sport: Swimming
- Strokes: Freestyle
- Club: Women's Swimming Association (WSA)
- Coach: Louis Handley (WSA)
Medal record
Women's swimming
Representing the United States
Olympic Games
Bronze medal – third place	1936 Berlin	4×100 m freestyle relay

Mavis Anne Freeman (November 7, 1918 – October 1988) was an American competition swimmer who competed for the Women's Swimming Association of New York and represented the United States in the 1936 Summer Olympics in Berlin, Germany.

== Early swimming ==
Freeman was born on November 7, 1918, in Brooklyn, and attended New York's Port Washington High School where she valued scholarship and was a good student. She trained initially at the Great South Bay Yacht Club, near Bay Shore. After taking lessons at the Women's Swimming Association (WSA) of New York, she progressed more rapidly in both speed and technique. The WSA was managed and founded by Charlotte Epstein, and coached by Louis Handley, a former 1904 Olympic gold medalist, who oversaw Freeman's progress and assisted with lessons. Between October and December 1934, swimming under Handley's supervision, Freeman cut her time in the 100-yard freestyle from 1:17 to 1:10. By May, 1936, Freeman was a National Junior Champion in the 100-meter event, with a time of 1:02 set in 1935, and had captured the AAU Senior title for New York's Metropolitan District in the 220-yard distance.

== 1936 Olympic bronze ==
In the Olympic preliminaries in Berlin, the U.S. 4x100 freestyle relay team finished first with a 4:47.1, edging out the British team by only 1/10 of a second, requiring a decision. Freeman swam the third leg, and the Americans qualified for the finals, as the teams with the top three finishes were selected. The Dutch relay team, however, was considerably faster, swimming their separate preliminary heat in a time of only 4:38.1, marking them as a clear favorite for the finals.

On August 14, 1936, at only 17, Freeman earned a bronze medal swimming the third leg as a member of the third-place U.S. team in the women's 4×100-meter freestyle relay, together with her teammates Katherine Rawls, Bernice Lapp and Olive McKean. The Americans finished in a time of 4:40.2.

International Swimming Hall of Fame member Ray Daughters was Head Coach for the U.S. Olympic Women's swimming team that year. With Olive McKean swimming the anchor or final leg, the U.S. 4x100-meter team finished four seconds behind the second place team from Germany who lost to the Dutch team in a close finish. The German team led with 20 meters left in the race, but Rita Mastenbroek of the Dutch team overtook the German swimmer in the final meters. The Americans led through the second lap, but fell back. Historically, the American team had frequently won the event and had on several occasions held the world record prior to the games, but in 1936 the Dutch team had set the World Record and were the heavy favorite.

Freeman captured the Long Distance title in AAU competition in both 1936 and 1937.

In 1940's, Freeman spent some time in theater, and received praise for her performance in John Shatz's "Blow Bugle Blow", performed at the Rochester Summer Theatre in East Avon, New York in August 1940. In 1944, she worked as the understudy in the New York City play "Lovers and Friends". In September, 1944, she appeared in the play "Last Stop" at the Barrymore Theater, a play about a group of women fighting for their rights. In January, 1945, she appeared in the Ben Martin comedy "Bonanza".

== See also ==
- List of Olympic medalists in swimming (women)
