= Ursula Pollack =

German swimmer (born 1919)

Personal information
- Born: 27 October 1919 Berlin, Germany

Sport
- Sport: Swimming

Ursula Pollack (born 27 October 1919, date of death unknown) was a German freestyle swimmer who competed in the 1936 Summer Olympics. She was born in Berlin. In 1936 she was a member of the German relay team that won the silver medal in the 4 × 100 metre freestyle relay event. Pollack swam in the semi-final and helped the team to qualify for the final. She did not compete in the final, and was not therefore awarded a medal. Pollack is deceased.
