= Grete Ittlinger =

Austrian swimmer (1922–2004)

Personal information
- Born: 14 April 1922 Innsbruck, Austria
- Died: 24 February 2004 (aged 81) Austria

Sport
- Sport: Swimming

Grete Ittlinger (14 April 1922 – 24 February 2004) was an Austrian swimmer. She competed in the women's 4 × 100 metre freestyle relay at the 1936 Summer Olympics. Ittlinger swam with Roma Wagner, Franziska Mally and Elli von Kropiwnicki and they failed to make the first three, and the finals, by coming last in the first semi-final. Ittlinger died on 24 February 2004, at the age of 81.
