= Helena Salles =

Brazilian swimmer

Personal information
- Full name: Helena de Moraes Salles
- Nationality: Brazil
- Born: July 8, 1919 Brazil
- Died: June 1, 2011 (aged 91)

Sport
- Sport: Swimming
- Strokes: Freestyle
Medal record
Women's swimming
Representing Brazil

Helena de Moraes Salles (July 8, 1919 – June 1, 2011) was an Olympic freestyle swimmer from Brazil, who participated at one Summer Olympics for her native country.

At the 1936 Summer Olympics in Berlin, she swam the 100-metre freestyle, not reaching the finals. Salles died in 2011 at the age of 91.
