= Scylla Venâncio =

Brazilian swimmer (born 1917)

Personal information
- Full name: Scylla Venâncio
- Nationality: Brazil
- Born: 9 May 1917 São Paulo, Brazil

Sport
- Sport: Swimming
- Strokes: Freestyle
Medal record
Women's swimming
Representing Brazil

Scylla Venâncio (born 9 May 1917, date of death unknown) was an Olympic freestyle swimmer from Brazil, who participated at one Summer Olympics for her native country. At the 1936 Summer Olympics in Berlin, she swam the 100-metre and 400-metre freestyle, not reaching the finals. Venancio is deceased.

Venâncio participated in the 1936 Berlin Olympics, competing in two events :

- Women's 100 metres Freestyle: She finished 31st overall and did not advance to the finals.
- Women's 400 metres Freestyle: She finished 20th overall and did not advance to the finals .

== Career Highlights ==
- Travessia de São Paulo a Nado: In 1937, she won this traditional 5,500-metre open water swimming race in Brazil
