= Mary McConkey =

Canadian swimmer

Personal information
- Full name: Mary Christine McConkey
- National team: Canada
- Born: February 29, 1916
- Died: October 27, 1981 (aged 65)

Sport
- Sport: Swimming
- Strokes: Backstroke, freestyle

Mary Christine McConkey (February 29, 1916 – October 27, 1981) was a competitive swimmer who swam in freestyle and backstroke events. As a 19-year-old, McConkey represented Canada at the 1936 Summer Olympics in Berlin, Germany. She was a member of the Canadian team that finished fourth in the women's 4x100-metre freestyle relay. Individually, McConkey also competed in the women's 100-metre backstroke, but she did not advance beyond the first round.
