= Gisela Arendt =

German swimmer (1918–1969)

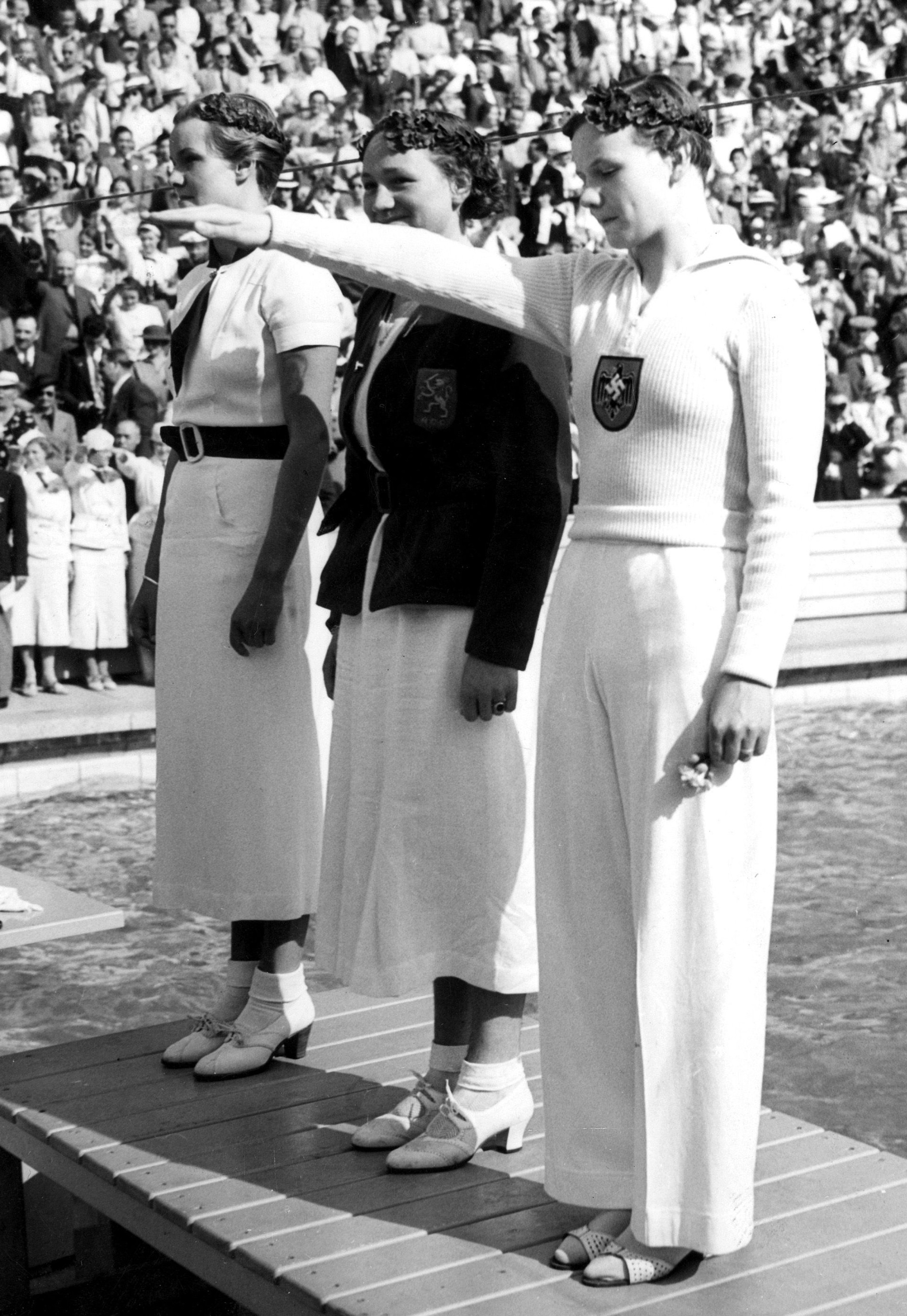
- The podium of 100 m freestyle at the 1936 Olympics: Jeannette Campbell (silver), Rie Mastenbroek (gold), and Gisela Arendt (bronze)

Personal information
- Born: 5 November 1918 Berlin, German Empire
- Died: 16 February 1969 (aged 50) Bonn, West Germany

Sport
- Sport: Swimming
- Club: Nixe Charlottenburg, Berlin; SSF Bonn 1905
Medal record
Women's swimming
Representing Germany
Summer Olympics
Silver medal – second place	1936 Berlin	4×100 m freestyle
Bronze medal – third place	1936 Berlin	100 m freestyle
European Championships
Silver medal – second place	1934 Magdeburg	100 m backstroke
Silver medal – second place	1934 Magdeburg	4×100 m freestyle
Bronze medal – third place	1934 Magdeburg	100 m freestyle

Gisela Jacob (née Arendt; 5 November 1916 – 18 February 1969) was a German swimmer who won three medals at the 1934 European Aquatics Championships and two medals at the 1936 Summer Olympics. She also competed at the 1952 Olympics and finished seventh in the 4 × 100 m freestyle relay. She won eight national titles in the 100 m freestyle (1933–1937, 1939, 1949) and 100 m backstroke (1934), competing as Arendt before World War II and as Jacob after the war. Her brother, Heinz Arendt, and son, Rainer Jacob, (b. 1946) were both Olympics swimmers, and Heinz competed alongside Gisela at the 1936 Olympics.
