= Cathy Jamison =

American swimmer (born 1950)

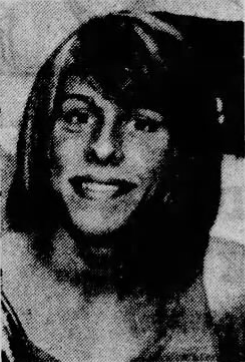
- Jamison, circa 1967

Personal information
- Nickname: Cathy
- National team: United States
- Born: March 26, 1950 (age 76) Portland, Oregon, U.S.
- Height: 5 ft 7 in (1.70 m)
- Weight: 134 lb (61 kg)
- Spouse: Paul Imwalle
- Children: 3

Sport
- Sport: Swimming
- Strokes: Breaststroke
- Club: Multinomah Athletic Club; Santa Clara Swim Club
- Coach: Olive McKean (MAC); George Haines (Santa Clara)

Catherine Jamison (born March 26, 1950) also known by her married name Jamison-Imwalle is an American former competition swimmer who swam for Portland's Multinomah Athletic Club and participated in the 1968 Mexico City Olympics for the United States, finishing 5th in the 200-meter breaststroke.

== Early life ==
Jamison was born in Portland, Oregon, on March 26, 1950 to Mr. and Mrs. James W. Jamison. She had three younger siblings who all competed in swimming in their youth. As a six-year old, Jamison had her first swim lesson at the outdoor pool at Portland's Jewish Community Center, but was not pleased with the experience. Determined, she returned for lessons the next summer. She attended St. Helen's Hall Elementary and Hayhurst Elementary, and began competing in swim meets while in grade school at Hayhurst. Achieving local recognition at an early age, while still at Hayhurst Elementary she was part of the girls' swimming team that won Portland's city championship in four successive years from 1959-1962.

In her youth she started at Tualatin Hills Swim club, but began training in earnest in the 1960's with former 1936 Olympic bronze medalist Olive McKean at Portland's Multinomah Athletic Club (MAC), a premier club that produced a number of Olympians. Jamison trained at MAC through High School. She was a 1967 graduate of Portland's Wilson High School where she was on the year book staff, played violin and viola, was a member of Quill and Scroll, maintained an "A" average, and was in the Mathematics honorary.

== Swimming ==
=== High school ===
Swimming for Wilson High around her freshman year, she was part of a National Championship High School Medley team in 1963-64. Swimming for the Multinomah Athletic Club at an AAU National Meet as a 14-year-old in December 1964, Jamison broke the national age record for the 220 yard breaststroke with a time of 2:58.9. In 1965, she earned a spot at Mexico City's Little Olympics, where she took a gold medal in the 400 Individual Medley. During her High School years, she was an Oregon state champion four times in the 100-yard breaststroke from 1963-1966, and held titles in the 200 freestyle and 200 medley relay.

While swimming for the Multinomah Athletic Club at age 14, Jamison competed in the 1964 Olympic trials, but did not make the U.S. team. At the Oregon State Junior Olympics on June 27, 1964, in Springfield, Oregon, Jamison set a new National Junior Olympic record for the 100-yard breaststroke of 1:13.3, improving on the old mark by 1 second.

=== College ===
Beginning around the Fall of 1967, when she started college in Santa Clara, in preparation for a potential Olympic appearance she trained with the Santa Clara Swim Club in Santa Clara, California, under Hall of Fame coach George Haines. Haines was noted for producing Olympic swimmers, and would serve as the Olympic Head Coach for the Men's team in the 1968 Mexico Olympics.

On August 20, 1967, she secured a spot in the FINA games with a 4th place finish in the 200-meter breastroke (2:50.4) in the National AAU Swimming Championships in Philadelphia. She was also seventh in the 100 breaststroke, 9th in the 400 IM, and 10th in the 200 IM.

She entered Santa Clara University in the Fall of 1967 after a successful swimming career with Multinomah Athletic Club, and planned to swim with the Santa Clara Swim Club during college. At Santa Clara, she majored in Math, graduating in June, 1971. The University had no women's swimming team when she applied, and no other colleges offered swimming scholarships in 1967.

=== 1968 Summer Olympics ===
At the 1968 Olympic trials in Los Angeles, Jamison swam a personal best of 2:48 in the 200 breaststroke in the preliminaries, then swam a 2:45 to advance to the finals. In the Trial finals she reduced her time in the 200 breaststroke to 2:42, and placed second, securing her place on the U.S. Olympic Team.

After training around six weeks with the Olympic team at Colorado Springs to acclimate to Mexico City's altitude, she represented the United States as an 18-year-old at the 1968 Summer Olympics in Mexico City. She competed in the women's 200-meter breaststroke, and finished fifth overall in the event final with a time of 2:48.4. Sharon Wickman of the United States team won the 200-meter breaststroke gold in 2:44.4. If Jamison had swum closer to her best Olympic Trial finals time of 2:42, she would have medaled, and could have won the gold. As a result, she was somewhat disappointed with her performance, but enjoyed participating in the Olympics. Her MAC coach Olive McKean Mucha was the official U.S. Olympic Women's swim team chaperone in Mexico City that year, and also served as an Assistant Coach to the U.S. Women's team .

=== Coaching ===
Jamison retired from competitive swimming after breaking a leg on a ski trip with the family at Mt. Hood Meadows in 1968, not long after her participation in the Olympics. In the late 1990's, she coached swimming for four years at Mountain View High School in Bend, Oregon and may have coached for a time with the Bend Swim Club.

== Honors ==
In Spring, 1967 she received the Outstanding Athlete Award, and the Scholastic Athletic Award from Wilson High School, where she graduated that June. Her swimcap from the 1968 Olympics is in the Smithsonian Institution.

In 2004, Jamison was made a member of the Portland Interscholastic League Hall of Fame. In 1971, she became a member of the Santa Clara Hall of Fame, and was a member of the first inaugural class of the Oregon Swimming Hall of Fame in 2019. While swimming for Wilson High School, her National Championship Medley Relay team was named to the All America team, and she was an All American a total of three years.

== Personal life ==
Cathy met her husband Paul Imwalle in Santa Clara. The two married on September 11, 1971 at Portland's St. Thomas Moore Catholic Church. Cathy had graduated Santa Clara University in June, 1971. Paul, also a student at Santa Clara, had graduated in June, and had plans to begin studies towards a master's degree in marketing in Fall, 1971. The couple left California's Bay Area in the early 1970's and moved to Bend, Oregon about 150 miles Southeast of Jamison's native Portland. They started a business in Bend, I&J Carpets & Vinyl Flooring, operating it for over forty years. Paul and Cathy have three children who all swam competitively. Her two daughters received swimming scholarships at University of California and Oregon State.
