= Pierre Szekely =

Hungarian sculptor

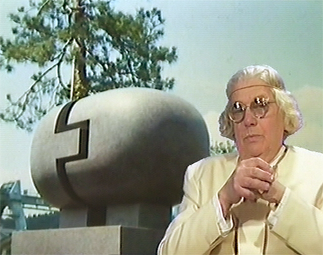
- Born: 11 June 1923; Budapest, Hungary
- Died: 3 April 2001 (age 77); Paris, France
- Known for: Sculptor
- Spouse: Vera Szekely

Pierre Szekely (11 June 1923) was a Hungarian-born sculptor, architect and educator.

== Biography ==
During the Holocaust, Pierre Szekely was interned in a Nazi concentration camp. In 1946, he escaped to France where he became a respected sculptor and architect.

In 1975, Szekely completed La Dame du Lac, which is an iconic climbing wall in the suburbs of Paris. The Dame du Lac is considered to have played an instrumental role in the development of Parkour by David Belle, made famous by early montages such as Speed Air Man (1997).
