= István Angyal =

Hungarian swimmer

Personal information
- Born: 18 October 1914 Tatabánya, Austria-Hungary
- Died: 1 October 1980 (aged 65) Tatabánya, Hungary

Sport
- Sport: Swimming

István Angyal (18 October 1914 – 1 October 1980) was a Hungarian swimmer. He competed in two events at the 1936 Summer Olympics.
