= Jopie Selbach =

Dutch swimmer (1918–1998)

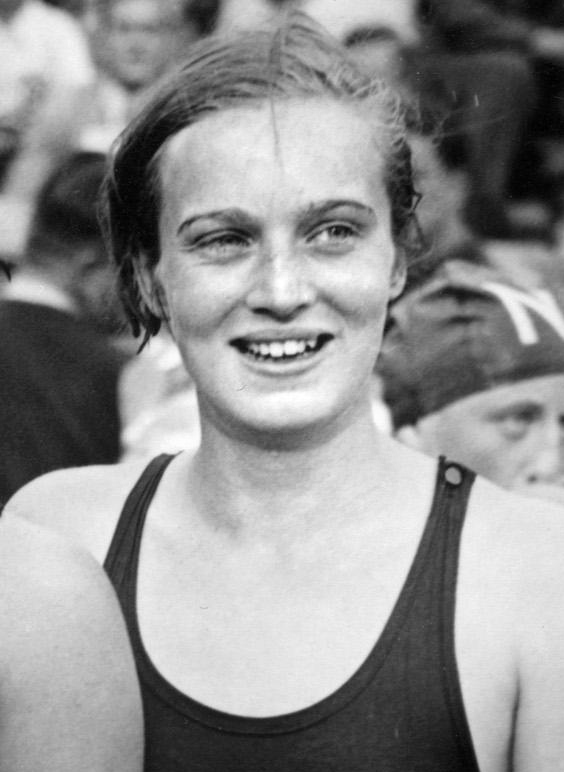
- Jopie Selbach, 1934 Magdeburg

Personal information
- Born: 27 July 1918 Haarlem, the Netherlands
- Died: 30 April 1998 (aged 79) Zoetermeer, the Netherlands

Sport
- Sport: Swimming
- Club: ADZ, Amsterdam
Medal record
Women's swimming
Representing the Netherlands
Summer Olympics
Gold medal – first place	1936 Berlin	4×100 m freestyle relay
European Championships
Gold medal – first place	1934 Magdeburg	4×100 m freestyle

Johanna Katarina "Jopie" Selbach (27 July 1918 – 30 April 1998) was a freestyle swimmer from the Netherlands. She won gold medals at the 1934 European Aquatics Championships (with Willy den Ouden, Rie Mastenbroek and Ans Timmermans) and 1936 Summer Olympics (with den Ouden, Mastenbroek and Tini Wagner) in the women's 4 × 100 m freestyle relay.
