= Bernice Lapp =

American swimmer (1917–2010)

Personal information
- Full name: Bernice Ruth Lapp
- National team: United States
- Born: September 11, 1917 North Plainfield, New Jersey, U.S.
- Died: September 8, 2010 (aged 92) Edison, New Jersey, U.S.
- Spouse: John Squier m. 1944
- Children: 2

Sport
- Sport: Swimming
- Strokes: Freestyle
- Club: Newark Women's Athletic Club
- College team: New York University; Women's team
- Coach: Virginia Zahn (Plainfield Y); Lisa Lindstrom (Penn Hall); Frances Froatz (NYU)
Medal record
Women's swimming
Representing the United States
Olympic Games
Bronze medal – third place	1936 Berlin	4x100 m freestyle relay

Bernice Ruth Lapp (September 11, 1917 – September 8, 2010), also known by her married name Bernice Squier, was an American competition swimmer who competed for Newark Women's Athletic Club, Penn Hall Preparatory School and New York University. She represented the United States at the 1936 Summer Olympics in Berlin where she won a bronze medal as part of the U.S. women's 4x100-meter freestyle relay.

Born in North Plainfield, New Jersey, to Mr. and Mrs. Frank Lapp on September 11, 1917, Bernice attended North Plainfield High School, and began swimming at Plainfield's YWCA, where a coach spotted her skills and offered training. In her Junior year at North Plainfield, she was President of the Girls' Athletic Association of North Plainfield High School. Lapp was coached by Virginia Zahn at the Plainfield YWCA during her high school years. Zahn taught Lapp the fundamentals for gaining efficiency in her freestyle stroke. In addition to helping place Lapp with the New Jersey Women's Athletic Club, Zahn helped Lapp to raise money for travel to out-of-state meets by starting the "Bernice Lapp Fund", which appealed to many organizations in the greater Plainfield area.

Through 1935, Lapp continued to swim for the Newark Women's Athletic Club. In one of her first National meets, she placed fourth in the 100-yard freestyle final at the National indoor Women's Championships in Chicago. In 1934, she held the New Jersey State Outdoor swimming record in the 50, 100, 220, and 440 yard freestyle, as well as for the 100-yard backstroke, and the 150-yard breaststroke. She also held indoor New Jersey State swimming records in the 100 and 500-meter freestyle, the 220-yard freestyle, and the medley. On January 10, 1934, representing the Newark Women's Athletic Club at an exhibition at the Newark YWCA, Lapp won the 40-yard freestyle and backstroke events, and also placed first in the 100-yard freestyle with a time of 1:10.2.

== Penn Hall School ==
Lapp in Penn Hall swimsuit, 1937

Around 1935, Lapp moved from North Plainfield High School to Chambersburg, Pennsylvania's Penn Hall Preparatory School to complete high school, while continuing to train and compete with Penn Hall's women's swim team. Lapp's swimming prowess helped her to obtain a scholarship to the prep school. Penn Hall was a boarding school, that operated from 1906 to 1973, originally a girls' school, and featured a Junior College in 1927. An exceptional program, from 1931 through 1936, the Penn Hall women's swim team completed their 1936 season with a record of 28-1 losing only to the Women's Swimming Association of Cleveland in March 1936. The Penn Hall team held the National Intercollegiate swimming championship, and defeated the outstanding women's swimming team from New York University, where Lapp would later swim. Lapp served as Penn Hall's swim team Captain for the 1936 season, and swam as a member of the 200-yard freestyle relay team that set a new pool record time of 2:12. Her top swim time that year for the 100-yard event was 1:02.5. In 1937, Lisa Lindstrom, a 1928 U.S. Olympic swimmer and former swimmer for Penn Hall, coached the Penn Hall women's team, along with John Miller as diving coach.

== 1936 Berlin Olympics ==
At the July, 1936, U.S. Olympic trials in Astoria, Long Island, at the age of 18, Lapp qualified for the Berlin Olympics by placing second to Katherine Rawls in the 100-meter freestyle. Rawls swam the trial final in 1:11.1, with Olive McKean and Mavis Freeman in the top four. All four qualified to swim in the 400-meter freestyle relay at the 1936 Olympics. Lapp also qualified to swim in the 100-meter freestyle.

Lapp left for Berlin aboard the U.S.S. Manhattan on July 15, 1936.

She won a bronze medal as a member of the third-place U.S. team in the women's 4×100-meter freestyle relay at the 1936 Berlin Olympics with the team of Katherine Rawls, Mavis Freeman and Olive McKean. Individually, she also competed in the semifinals of the women's 100-meter freestyle. Her time of 1:09.6 placed her fourth in the second preliminary heat, and tied for the 8th best time overall. A third-place finish in her 100-meter freestyle preliminary would have qualified her for the finals, though if she had repeated her time in the preliminaries, she would not have been near medal contention.

International Swimming Hall of Fame member Ray Daughters was Head Coach for the U.S. Olympic Women's swimming team in 1936. With Olive McKean swimming the anchor or final leg, the U.S. 4x100-meter team finished four seconds behind the second place team from Germany who lost to the Dutch team in a close finish. The German team led with 20 meters left in the race, but Rita Mastenbroek of the Dutch team overtook the German swimmer in the final meters. The Americans led through the second lap, but fell back. Historically, the American team had frequently won the event and had on several occasions held the world record prior to the games, but in 1936 the Dutch team had set the World Record and were the heavy favorite.

=== New York University ===
Lapp attended New York University, where she continued to compete in swimming, placing second in the 50-yard backstroke in a meet with Temple University in March, 1939. The NYU Co-ed swimming team had an outstanding program, with a record of 57–8 in dual meet competition from 1925 to 1938. The women's team was coached by Frances V. Froatz, who was also a director of Athletics, and a 1976 inductee into the NYU Athletic Hall of Fame.

== Later life ==
Lapp married John A. Squier on the afternoon of August 5, 1944 at Watchung Presbyterian Church in greater Plainfield, New Jersey. Squier was employed at the Plainfield Post Office at the time.

Lapp later settled in South Plainfield, New Jersey, in 1950 near where she had lived much of her life. She lived primarily as a homemaker with her husband, John, and two daughters, and devoted much of her time to her family and events at North Plainfield's Watchung Avenue Presbyterian Church.

Bernice Lapp Squier died on September 8, 2010, in Haven Hospice at JFK Medical Center in Edison, New Jersey. In 1971, her husband John of over 25 years pre-deceased her. Services were held at Watchung Avenue Presbyterian Church in North Plainfield, where she had been active as a member and had been married. Lapp was buried in Hillside Cemetery in Scotch Plains, New Jersey.

== See also ==
- List of Olympic medalists in swimming (women)
