= Elvi Svendsen =

Danish swimmer (1920–2013)

Personal information
- Born: January 8, 1920 Copenhagen, Denmark
- Died: February 7, 2013 (aged 93)

Sport
- Sport: Swimming
Medal record
Representing Denmark
European Championships
Gold medal – first place	1947 Monte Carlo	4x100m freestyle relay

Elvi Svendsen, later Carlsen (January 8, 1920 – February 7, 2013) was a Danish backstroke and freestyle swimmer who competed in the 1936 Summer Olympics and in the 1948 Summer Olympics.

She was born in Copenhagen. She was the daughter-in-law of Carl Carlsen and the sister-in-law of Inger Carlsen.

In 1936, she was a member of the Danish relay team which finished seventh in the 4×100 metre freestyle relay event. In the 100 metre freestyle competition she was eliminated in the first round.

Twelve years later she helped the Danish relay team to qualify for the final of the 4×100 metre freestyle relay event. The Danish team won the silver medal, but she did not compete in the final and was not awarded with a medal.
