= Phyllis Dewar =

Canadian swimmer

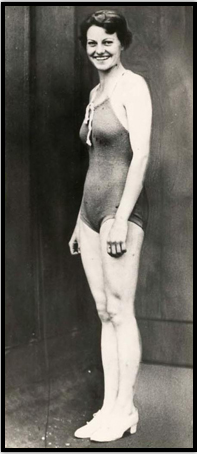

Personal information
- Full name: Phyllis Delma Dewar
- National team: Canada
- Born: March 5, 1916 Moose Jaw, Saskatchewan, Canada
- Died: April 8, 1961 (aged 45) Toronto, Ontario, Canada

Sport
- Sport: Swimming
- Strokes: Freestyle
Medal record
Women's swimming
Representing Canada
British Empire Games
| Gold medal – first place | 1934 London | 100 yd freestyle |
| Gold medal – first place | 1934 London | 440 yd freestyle |
| Gold medal – first place | 1934 London | 4×110 yd freestyle |
| Gold medal – first place | 1934 London | 3×110 yd medley |
| Gold medal – first place | 1938 Sydney | 4×110 yd freestyle |

Phyllis Delma Dewar (March 5, 1916 – April 8, 1961), also known by her married name Phyllis Lowery, was a Canadian competition swimmer and freestyle specialist. At the 1936 Summer Olympics in Berlin, Germany, she was a member of the Canadian relay team that finished fourth in the women's 4×100-metre freestyle relay. In the 100-metre freestyle, she advanced to the semifinals of the event before being eliminated.

In the 1934 British Empire Games in London, she won gold medals in the 100-yard and 440-yard freestyle events and in two relays. Four years later, at the 1938 Empire Games in Sydney, she won her fifth gold medal in the 4×110-yard freestyle relay.

== Early life ==
Dewar was born on March 5, 1916, in Moose Jaw, Saskatchewan. She began swimming during her early childhood.

== Career ==
In the mid-1930s, Dewar was the Canadian freestyle record holder in numerous freestyle events including the 100-yard and one-mile races. In international competitions, she won four gold medals at the 1934 British Empire Games and her final gold at the 1938 British Empire Games. She also competed at the 1936 Summer Olympics but did not medal. After ending her swimming career in the late 1930s, Dewar served in the Women's Royal Canadian Naval Service.

== Awards and honors ==
In 1934, Dewar was the recipient of both the Bobbie Rosenfeld Award and Velma Springstead Trophy as the best Canadian female athlete of that year. Dewar was posthumously inducted into the Saskatchewan Sports Hall of Fame in 1967. Other posthumous inductions include Canada's Sports Hall of Fame in 1971 and the Canadian Olympic Hall of Fame in 1972.

== Death ==
Dewar died on April 8, 1961, in Toronto, Ontario.

== Personal life ==
Dewar was married with four children.
