= Franziska Mally =

Austrian swimmer

Personal information
- Born: 31 October 1916

Sport
- Sport: Swimming

Franziska Mally (born 31 October 1916, date of death unknown) was an Austrian swimmer. She competed in the women's 4 × 100 metre freestyle relay at the 1936 Summer Olympics. Mally was in the freestyle relay with Grete Ittlinger, Roma Wagner and Elli von Kropiwnicki but they failed to make the first three, and the finals, by coming last in the first semi-final.
