= Margaret Stone (swimmer) =

Canadian swimmer

Personal information
- Full name: Margaret Annice Stone
- National team: Canada
- Born: July 23, 1919 Toronto, Ontario, Canada
- Died: May 27, 2001 (aged 81) Geelong, Victoria, Australia

Sport
- Sport: Swimming
- Strokes: Freestyle

Margaret Annice Stone (July 23, 1919 – May 27, 2001), later known by her married name Margaret Donato, was a Canadian freestyle swimmer who competed in the 1936 Summer Olympics in Berlin, Germany. She was a member of the Canadian relay team which finished fourth in the women's 4x100-metre freestyle relay. In the women's 100-metre freestyle, she was eliminated in the semi-finals.
