= Elli von Kropiwnicki =

Austrian swimmer

Personal information
- Full name: Eleonore Maria Leopoldine von Kropiwnicki
- Born: 11 November 1915 Vienna, Austria-Hungary

Sport
- Sport: Swimming

Eleonore von Kropiwnicki was an Austrian swimmer. She competed in the women's 4 × 100 metre freestyle relay at the 1936 Summer Olympics. Von Kropiwnicki was in the women's 4 × 100 metre freestyle relay with Grete Ittlinger, Franziska Mally and Roma Wagner and they failed to make the first three, and the finals, by coming last in the first semi-final.

Von Kropiwnicki married Friedrich Hruschka and had three daughters. She went missing during WWII.
