= Eva Arndt =

Danish swimmer (1919–1993)

Personal information
- Born: Eva Johanne Arndt; 27 November 1919 Aarhus
- Died: 18 June 1993 (aged 73) Gjesing
Medal record
Women's swimming
Representing Denmark
Olympic Games
Silver medal – second place	1948 London	4x100 m freestyle relay
European Championships
Gold medal – first place	1938 London	4×100 m freestyle

Eva Johanne Arndt (later Riise, 27 November 1919 – 18 June 1993) was a Danish backstroke and freestyle swimmer who competed in the 1936 Summer Olympics and in the 1948 Summer Olympics.

She was born in Aarhus and died in Gjesing, Rougsø Municipality.

In 1936 she was a member of the Danish relay team which finished seventh in the 4×100-metre freestyle relay event. In the 100-metre freestyle competition she was eliminated in the first round.

Twelve years later she won the silver medal with the Danish relay team in the 4×100-metre freestyle relay event.
