= Katherine Rawls =

American swimmer and diver

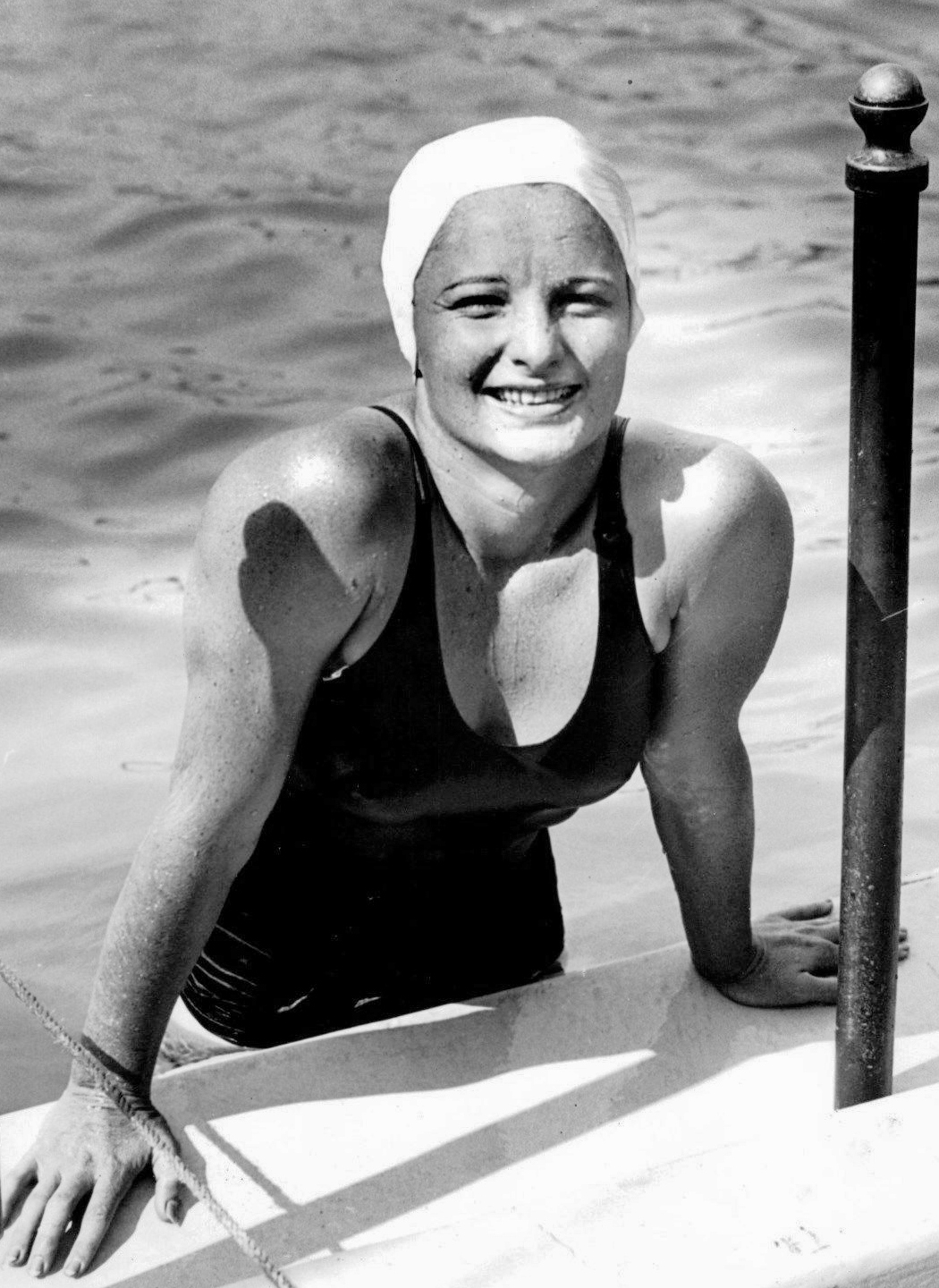
- Rawls in 1935

Personal information
- Full name: Katherine Louise Rawls
- Nicknames: "Katy," "The Minnow"
- National team: United States
- Born: June 14, 1917 Nashville, Tennessee, U.S.
- Died: April 8, 1982 (aged 64) White Sulphur Springs, West Virginia, U.S.

Sport
- Sport: Swimming
- Strokes: Freestyle, springboard diving
- Club: Miami Beach Swimming Club
Medal record
Representing the United States
Olympic Games
Diving
Silver medal – second place	1932 Los Angeles	3 m springboard
Silver medal – second place	1936 Berlin	3 m springboard
Swimming
Bronze medal – third place	1936 Berlin	4×100 m freestyle

Katherine Louise Rawls (June 14, 1917 – April 8, 1982), also known by her married names Katherine Thompson and Katherine Green, was an American competition swimmer and diver. She was the United States national champion in multiple events during the 1930s. She was a 1932 Olympic silver medalist in 3-metre springboard diving and in the 1936 Olympics repeated as a silver medalist on the 3-meter board, while capturing a bronze medal as part of the 4x100 freestyle relay team.

== Swimming career ==
Rawls was born in Nashville, Tennessee to William and Sadie Rawls on June 14, 1917. She learned to swim at the age of two, in Saint Augustine, Florida, and took up diving at the age of seven in Tampa, from a 25-foot (7.6m) platform. During her swimming career she was known as Katy and nicknamed The Minnow. Her sisters Dorothy (Williams), and Evelyn (McKee), were also Florida state champion swimmers, and the siblings were known collectively as the "Rawls' Diving Trio". Together with sister Peggy (Wedgworth) and brother Sonny, a champion diver, the Ralings siblings went to junior contests and exhibitions, as "Rawls' Water Babies".

=== 1931 U.S. Nationals ===
Rawls caused a sensation at the 1931 U.S. National Championships at just 14, when she defeated star Eleanor Holm in the 300m individual medley setting a new world record, and the next day defeated reigning champion Margaret Hoffman in the 220 yard breaststroke.

== 1932 Olympics ==
Rawls moved from Hollywood, Florida to Fort Lauderdale in 1932. She received sponsorship from Miami Beach to attend the trials for the 1932 Olympics, and was sometimes misidentified with that city. At the trials, she unexpectedly failed to qualify in the 200m-meter breaststroke: told by her coach to conserve her strength and aim for the third and last qualifying spot, she narrowly finished fourth. After her loss, she rowed across to the springboard diving, where she impressively beat champion Georgia Coleman in the trials. She scratched from the high diving because of high winds.

At the 1932 Olympics, Rawls competed in the 3 metre springboard diving event, and finished second to Georgia Coleman for the silver medal, losing to a rival she had recently beaten in the U.S. trials.

Rawls managed to beat Coleman at the National championships that September: one of four victories, the maximum then possible at one meet. She enjoyed sustained success thereafter, often competing in exhibition and carnival events, including a "swim decathlon" in 1934 before a crowd of 50,000, in which she won every event. By 1935, the New York Times considered her the favorite in seven of the nine events in the upcoming Nationals, depending on which she chose to compete in. Her best swimming events were the individual medley and the distance events, neither of which were Olympic events in the 1930s. (The medley used only three strokes: the butterfly stroke was not separated from the breaststroke until 1952.)

== 1936 Berlin Olympics ==
She succeeded in qualifying for the 100-meter freestyle in the U.S. trials for the 1936 Summer Olympics by winning the 100-meter event. After travelling to Berlin, however, in the intense international competition of the 100-meter Olympic finals, she finished seventh. Rawls won a bronze medal in the women's 4×100-meter freestyle relay with the team of Bernice Lapp, Mavis Freeman and Olive McKean. In the 3-meter springboard diving competition, she captured the silver medal, suffering a highly unexpected defeat on the last dive, to teammate Marjorie Gestring, who was herself just 13. Subsequently, Rawls concentrated on swimming rather than diving.

In 1937, hours after disembarking at San Francisco after a swimming tour of Japan, she commenced a three-day streak at the Nationals which produced an unprecedented four individual swimming titles. For this she was named Associated Press Female Athlete of the Year for 1937, and polled third for the James E. Sullivan Award. In 1938 she retained all four National titles. At the time she was holder of 18 national swimming records in breaststroke, freestyle, and medley events, and had been undefeated in medley races for eight years.

Rawls retired from swimming in 1939, but returned to diving for the trials of the 1948 Olympics, placing fifth with 108.56 points. Second of the three qualifiers was eventual gold medalist Victoria Draves with a score of 111.14, and Marjorie Gestring fourth with a score of 110.67.

=== U.S. National championships ===
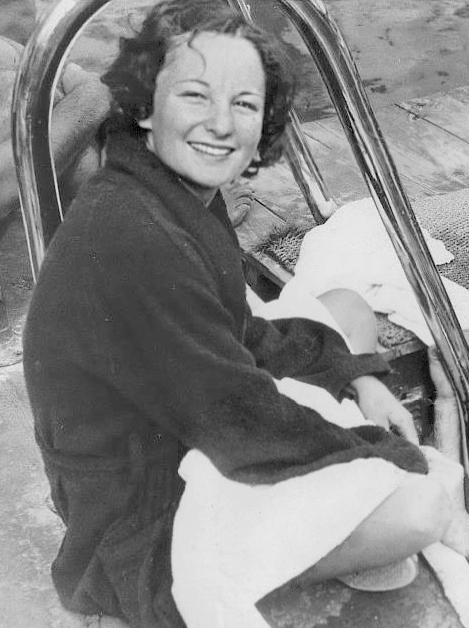
Rawls in 1938.

Rawls won a total of 33 U.S. national titles: 5 in diving and 28 in swimming, both indoors at the Spring Nationals and outdoors at the Summer Nationals.

- 1931 Summer: 1st in 300m medley, 220yd breaststroke; 2nd in springboard diving
- 1932 Summer: 1st in 300m medley, 220yd breaststroke, 880yd freestyle, springboard diving
- 1933 Spring: 1st in 300yd medley, lowboard diving
- 1933 Summer: 1st in 300m medley, springboard diving; 2nd in 220yd breaststroke
- 1934 Spring: 1st in 300yd medley, lowboard diving; 2nd in highboard diving
- 1934 Summer: 1st in 300m medley, springboard diving
- 1935 Spring: 1st in 300yd medley, 100yd breaststroke, 100yd freestyle; 2nd in 220yd freestyle
- 1935 Summer: 1st in 300m medley, 220yd breaststroke
- 1936 Spring: 1st in 300yd medley, 100yd breaststroke
- 1936 Summer: 1st in 300m medley
- 1937 Spring: 1st in 300yd medley, 100yd breaststroke; 2nd in 500yd freestyle
- 1937 Summer: 1st in 300m medley, 440yd, 880yd, & mile freestyle
- 1938 Spring: 1st in 300m medley, 100yd breaststroke
- 1938 Summer: 1st in 300m medley, 440yd, 880yd, & mile freestyle

== Later life ==
In November 1937, Rawls' parents announced her engagement to advertising executive William Starr. On May 18, 1938, unbeknown to her mother, Rawls married Theodore H. Thompson, an airplane pilot. Subsequent to the marriage, she began work at the Thompson School of Aviation in Fort Lauderdale, having qualified as a pilot during her swimming career. While continuing to swim at exhibitions, she decided to forgo competition at the 1939 Nationals, and retired from swimming when the 1940 Olympics were cancelled due to World War II. She was one of the initial 28 pilots who formed the Women's Auxiliary Ferrying Squadron in 1942, stationed at Detroit, transporting military cargo by air as part of the U.S. war effort. In 1943, her husband reportedly sued her for divorce, but dropped the charges anticipating her return from Detroit to his farm in Florida.

Rawls was a swimming instructor for 20 years at The Greenbrier in White Sulphur Springs, West Virginia.

=== Honors ===
In 1965, she was one of the inaugural inductees to the International Swimming Hall of Fame, and officially opened its pool in Fort Lauderdale, near the former Casino Pool where she had trained in the 1930s.

She died from cancer in 1982 after several years of illness.

== See also ==
- List of members of the International Swimming Hall of Fame
- List of athletes with Olympic medals in different disciplines
- List of Olympic medalists in swimming (women)

== Bibliography ==
- Nason, Jerry (1977) [1939]. "VII: Katherine Rawls: Little Miss Minnow". In Harold Kaese (ed.). Famous American Athletes of Today (Sixth Series ed.). Ayer. ISBN 0-8369-2233-6.
- Pieroth, Doris Hinson (1996). Their Day in the Sun: Women of the 1932 Olympics. University of Washington Press. ISBN 0-295-97554-7.
