= Vera Harsányi =

Hungarian swimmer (1919–1994)

- Born: 12 October 1919; Piestany, Hungary
- Died: 24 December 1994 (aged 75); Janvry, France
- Known for: Swimming, Sculpture
- Spouse: Pierre Szekely

Vera Harsányi, or Vera Szekely (12 October 1919 – 24 December 1994) was a Hungarian freestyle swimmer who competed in the 1936 Summer Olympics, and then an artist.

== Biography ==
In 1936 she was a member of the Hungarian relay team, which finished fourth in the 4 x 100 metre freestyle relay event. In the 100 metre freestyle competition as well as in the 400 metre freestyle event she was eliminated in the first round.

In 1946 after several months' stay in Vienna, she went to Paris with her husband Pierre Szekely. In 1947 she participated in the exhibition of Hungarian artists in Paris at the Galerie de Bussy. Later she presents her achievements in solo exhibitions in Paris, several times, but also in Orléans, Amiens, Nice, The Hague, Lund, Amsterdam, Budapest.
