= László Hidvégi =

Hungarian diver

Personal information
- Nationality: Hungarian
- Born: 5 November 1916 Budapest
- Died: 15 January 2003 (aged 86)

Sport
- Sport: Diving
Medal record
Men's diving
Representing Hungary
European Championships
Bronze medal – third place	1938 London	10 m highboard
Bronze medal – third place	1947 Monte Carlo	3 m springboard

László Hidvégi (5 November 1916 – 15 January 2003) was a Hungarian diver. He was born in Budapest. He competed at the 1936 Summer Olympics in Berlin, where he placed 18th in 10 metre platform, and 18th in springboard.
