= Ágnes Bíró =

Hungarian swimmer

Personal information
- Born: December 28, 1917 Budapest, Austria-Hungary
- Died: 2008 (aged 90–91)

Sport
- Sport: Swimming

Ágnes Bíró (December 28, 1917 – 2008) was a Hungarian freestyle swimmer who competed in the 1936 Summer Olympics. She was born in Budapest.

In 1936, she was a member of the Hungarian relay team which finished fourth in the 4 x 100 metre freestyle relay event. In the 400 metre freestyle competition she was eliminated in the first round.
