= Kazue Kojima =

Japanese swimmer (1916–1992)

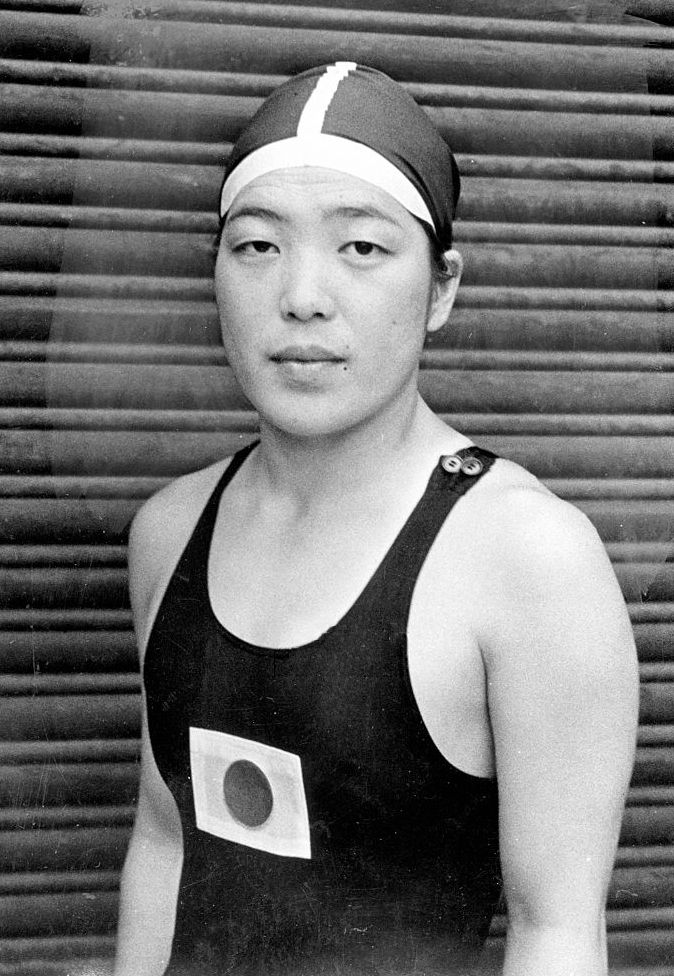
- Kazue Kojima c.1936

Personal information
- Born: October 30, 1916
- Died: 1992 (aged 75–76)

Sport
- Sport: Swimming

Kazue Kojima (小島 一枝, Kojima Kazue; October 30, 1916 – 1992) was a Japanese freestyle swimmer who competed in the 1932 and 1936 Summer Olympics. In 1932 she was a member of the Japanese relay team that finished fifth in the 4×100 mm freestyle relay. In the 100 m freestyle competition she was eliminated in the first round. Four years later she finished sixth in the 400 m freestyle. In the 100 m freestyle competition she was eliminated in the semi-finals, and as part of the Japanese 4 × 100 m relay team she was eliminated in the first round.
