= Tini Wagner =

Dutch swimmer (1919–2004)

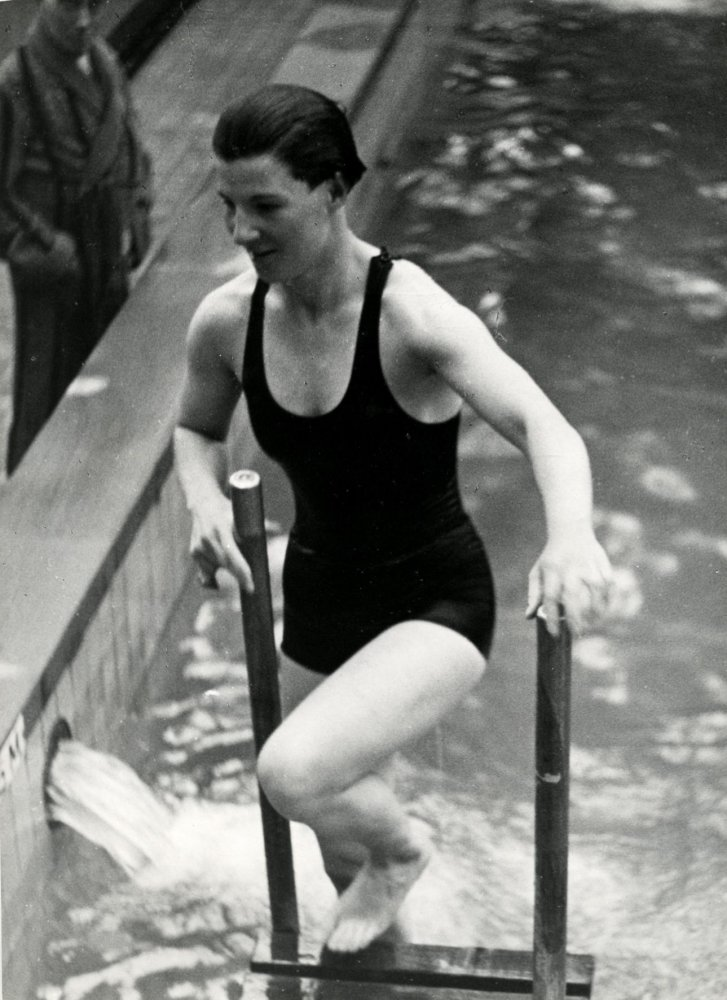

Personal information
- Born: December 17, 1919 Amsterdam, Netherlands
- Died: June 2, 2004 (aged 84) Soest, Netherlands

Sport
- Sport: Swimming
Medal record
Representing the Netherlands
Olympic Games
| Gold medal – first place | 1936 Berlin | 4×100 m freestyle relay |

Catharina "Tini" Wilhelmina Wagner (17 December 1919 – 2 June 2004) was a freestyle swimmer from the Netherlands, who represented her native country at the 1936 Summer Olympics in Berlin, Germany.

In 1936 she won the gold medal in the 4 × 100 m freestyle relay, alongside Willy den Ouden, Rie Mastenbroek and Jopie Selbach. In the 100 m freestyle competition she finished fifth and in the 400 m freestyle event she finished seventh.
