= Tsuneko Furuta =

Japanese swimmer

Personal information
- Born: 20 January 1921 Tatsuyo, Japan

Sport
- Sport: Swimming
- Strokes: freestyle

Tsuneko Furuta (古田 つね子, Furuta Tsuneko; born 20 January 1921) was a Japanese freestyle swimmer. She competed in two events at the 1936 Summer Olympics.
