= Flip Regout =

Dutch rower

Personal information
- Nationality: Dutch
- Born: 29 July 1915; Maastricht, Netherlands
- Died: 25 May 1993 (aged 77); The Hague, Netherlands

Sport
- Sport: Rowing

Flip Regout (29 July 1915 – 25 May 1993) was a Dutch rower. He competed in two events at the 1936 Summer Olympics.
