= László Hódi (diver) =

Hungarian diver

Personal information
- Nationality: Hungarian
- Born: 16 April 1912; Budapest
- Died: 18 November 1990 (aged 78)

Sport
- Sport: Diving

László Hódi (16 April 1912 – 18 November 1990) was a Hungarian diver. He was born in Budapest. He competed at the 1936 Summer Olympics in Berlin, where he placed 11th in 10 metre platform, and 22nd in springboard.
