= Ilona Ács =

Hungarian freestyle swimmer

Personal information
- Born: April 18, 1920 Budapest, Austria-Hungary
- Died: November 23, 1976 (aged 56) Budapest, Hungary

Sport
- Sport: Swimming

Ilona Ács (later Zimmermann; April 18, 1920 – November 23, 1976) was a Hungarian freestyle swimmer who competed in the 1936 Summer Olympics. She was born and died in Budapest. In 1936 she was a member of the Hungarian relay team that finished fourth in the 4 x 100 metre freestyle relay event. In the 100 metre freestyle competition she was eliminated in the first round.
