= Mak Schoorl =

Dutch rower (1913–2011)

Personal information
- Born: Martinus Schoorl; 9 February 1913 Haarlem, North Holland, Netherlands
- Died: 26 November 2011 (aged 98) Amsterdam

Sport
- Sport: Rowing
- Club: Nereus Rowing Club
Medal record
Men's rowing
Representing Netherlands
European Rowing Championships
Silver medal – second place	1937 Amsterdam	Coxed four

Martinus "Mak" Schoorl (9 February 1913 – 26 November 2011) was a Dutch rower. He competed in two events at the 1936 Summer Olympics.
