= Nicolaas van Hoorn =

Dutch fencer (1904–1946)

Personal information
- Born: 25 August 1904 Rotterdam, Netherlands
- Died: 17 June 1946 (aged 41) Harderwijk, Netherlands

Sport
- Sport: Fencing

Nicolaas van Hoorn (25 August 1904 – 17 June 1946) was a Dutch fencer. He competed in the individual and team épée events at the 1936 Summer Olympics.
