= Ruth Halbsguth =

German swimmer (1916–2003)

Personal information
- Born: December 9, 1916 Eckernförde, Germany
- Died: October 12, 2003 (aged 86)

Sport
- Sport: Swimming
Medal record
Representing Germany
Summer Olympics
Silver medal – second place	1936 Berlin	4×100 m freestyle
European Championships
Silver medal – second place	1934 Magdeburg	4×100 m freestyle

Ruth Halbsguth (9 December 1916 – 12 October 2003) was a German swimmer who competed in the 1936 Summer Olympics. She was born in Eckernförde.

In the 1936 Olympics she won a silver medal in the Women's 4 × 100 metre freestyle relay event.
