= Rei Takemura =

Japanese swimmer (born 1919)

Personal information
- Born: 29 April 1919

Sport
- Sport: Swimming
- Strokes: freestyle

Rei Takemura (竹村 令, Takemura Rei; born 29 April 1919, date of death unknown) was a Japanese freestyle swimmer. She competed in two events at the 1936 Summer Olympics. Takemura is deceased.
