= Willy den Ouden =

Dutch swimmer (1918–1997)

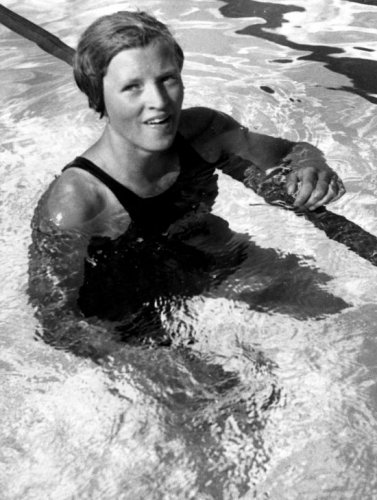

Personal information
- Full name: Willemijntje den Ouden
- Nickname: "Willy"
- National team: Netherlands
- Born: 1 January 1918 Rotterdam, Netherlands
- Died: 6 December 1997 (aged 79) Rotterdam, Netherlands
- Height: 1.63 m (5 ft 4 in)

Sport
- Sport: Swimming
- Strokes: Freestyle
- Club: RDZ, Rotterdam
- Coach: Pee van Wuijckhuise
Medal record
Women's swimming
Representing the Netherlands
Summer Olympics
| Gold medal – first place | 1936 Berlin | 4×100 m freestyle |
| Silver medal – second place | 1932 Los Angeles | 100 m freestyle |
| Silver medal – second place | 1932 Los Angeles | 4×100 m freestyle |
European Championships
| Gold medal – first place | 1931 Paris | 4×100 m freestyle |
| Gold medal – first place | 1934 Magdeburg | 100 m freestyle |
| Gold medal – first place | 1934 Magdeburg | 4×100 m freestyle |
| Silver medal – second place | 1931 Paris | 100 m freestyle |
| Silver medal – second place | 1934 Magdeburg | 400 m freestyle |
| Silver medal – second place | 1938 London | 4×100 m freestyle |

Willemijntje den Ouden (1 January 1918 – 6 December 1997) was a competitive swimmer from the Netherlands, who held the 100-meter freestyle world record for nearly 23 years, from 1933 to 1956.

== Biography ==
Den Ouden was a daughter of Willemijntje Kuipers and Antonius Victor Jozephus den Ouden, a café owner in Rotterdam, a town that was then the swimming center of the Netherlands. in 1931, at the age of 13, she became the Rotterdamsche Dames Zwemclub ("Rotterdam's Ladies Swimming Club") champion in her favorite discipline, 100m freestyle and broke the Dutch national record on that distance by 1.4 seconds with a time of 1:10.4. A year later, Den Ouden came in the international limelight when she participated at the 1932 Summer Olympics in Los Angeles and won two of the five contestable silver medals in swimming. In the series, she also broke the Olympic record on the 100 m. These accomplishments attracted wide attention since as a 14-year old she was also the youngest Olympic participant. Four years later at the 1936 Summer Olympics in Berlin, she was widely favored to win the same race, but came in fourth place in the final. She did win the gold medal in the women's 4 × 100 m freestyle relay with her compatriots Tini Wagner, Rie Mastenbroek and Jopie Selbach.

However, the diminutive Den Ouden -she reached 1.55 m (5.1 ft)- was far more successful between these two Olympic games. At the 1934 European Championships in Magdeburg she won all three contests she participated in, though her shared win at the 400 m race with Rie Mastenbroek led only to a silver medal when she refused to swim the race again to decide a winner. On July 9, 1933, in Antwerp, she broke Helene Madison's two-year-old world record on the 100 m freestyle, setting it at 1:06.0. She would improve on this three times, swimming 1:04.8 in April 1934 and finally reaching 1:04.6 on 27 February 1936 in Amsterdam. This record would last until 1956 when it was broken twice within ten days by Dawn Fraser and Cocky Gastelaars, respectively. Thus, she held the world record for the top event in swimming for an unequalled 22 years and 8 months.

Den Ouden further broke the world records on the 200 m freestyle (three times between 1933 and 1936), the 400 m freestyle (in 1934), and the now defunct distances of 100 yd, 150 yd, 220 yd, 300 yd, 400 yd, 300 m, and 500 m freestyle. She was also the anchor swimmer for the Dutch relay teams that broke the 4 × 100 m freestyle relay record in 1934 and in 1936. On February 4, 1934, she became the first woman to swim 100 yards in under a minute (59.8 seconds). In 1935 she held all 10 world-records freestyle swimming for 500 m and shorter simultaneously.

She retired from competitive swimming in 1938, at the age of 20, after obtaining a silver medal at the European Championship's 4 × 100 m freestyle relay. She set her eyes on an acting career and in 1939 she was cast in the Belgian movie Van het een komt het ander ("One Thing Leads to Another"). However the outbreak of the Second World War stopped the production. The German invasion of the Netherlands piled on the misery: Den Ouden was engaged, but her fiancé's family fled to America just before the invasion, and her parental house was destroyed on May 14, 1940, in the bombing of Rotterdam. Most if not all of her medals and prizes were lost in the burning rubble. Den Ouden herself fled to England, where in October 1943 she married Staffan Broms, son of a Swedish diplomat stationed in London. The couple moved to Saltsjöbaden in Sweden after the wedding, but the marriage didn't last and in 1946 Den Ouden returned to Rotterdam. She married twice more; in November 1953 to Wicher Hooite Jager (divorce in 1957) and in October 1958 to Jan Edwin Schupper. Her last marriage only lasted half a year. Den Ouden spent her further life in anonymity although she was inducted into the International Swimming Hall of Fame in 1970.

== See also ==
- List of members of the International Swimming Hall of Fame
- World record progression 100 metres freestyle
- World record progression 200 metres freestyle
- World record progression 400 metres freestyle

Records
| Preceded by Helene Madison | Women's 100 metre freestyle world record holder (long course); 9 July 1933 – 21 February 1956 | Succeeded by Dawn Fraser |
| Preceded by Helene Madison | Women's 200 metre freestyle world record holder (long course); 3 May 1933 – 26 February 1938 | Succeeded by Rie van Veen |
| Preceded by Helene Madison | Women's 400 metre freestyle world record holder (long course); 12 July 1934 – 10 February 1937 | Succeeded by Ragnhild Hveger |
