= Annie Timmermans =

Dutch swimmer

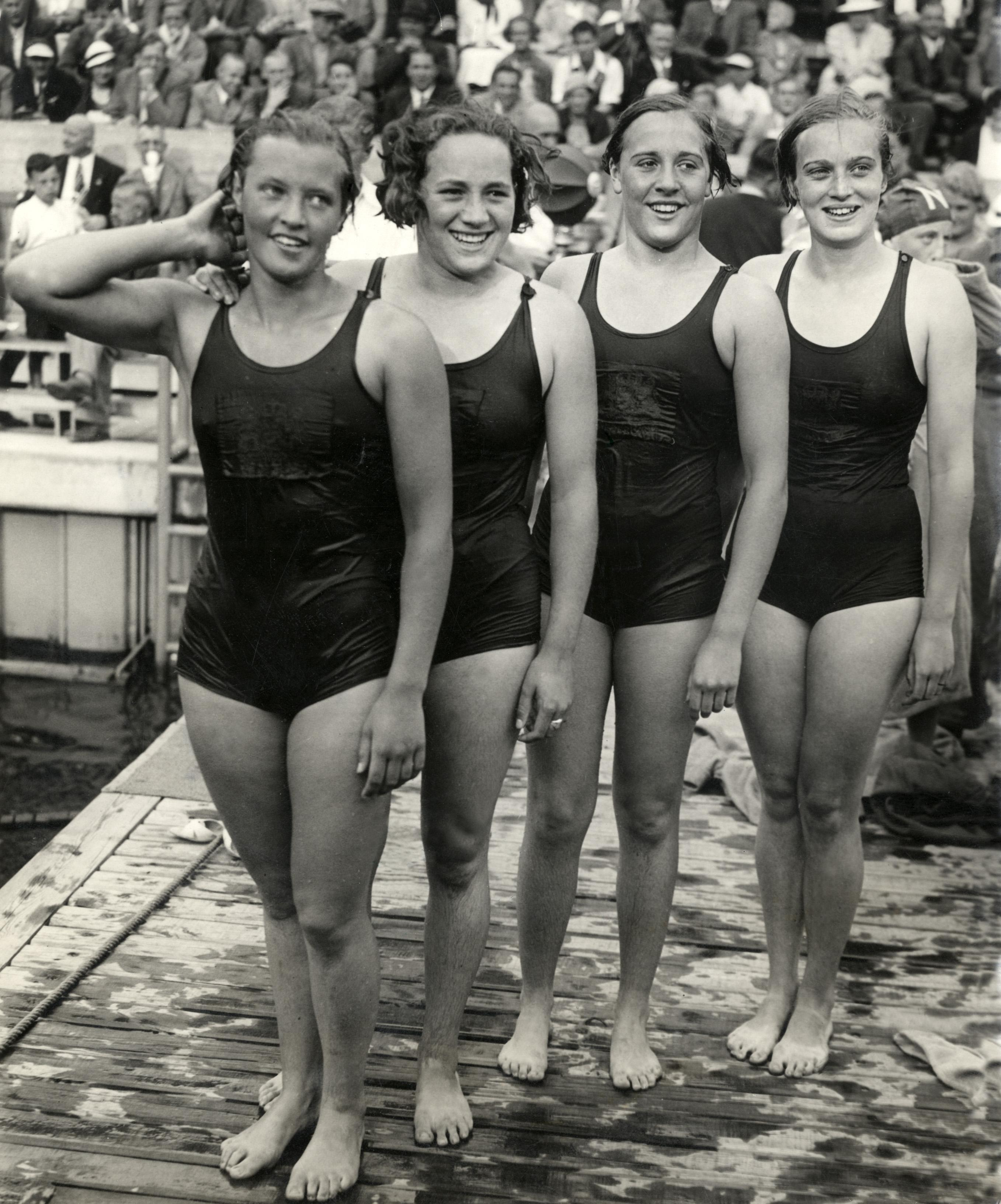
- Dutch relay team at the 1934 European Championships, Timmermans is second from right

Personal information
- Born: 10 April 1919 Rotterdam, the Netherlands
- Died: 21 August 1958 (aged 39) Parkdale, Victoria, Australia

Sport
- Sport: Swimming
- Club: RDZ, Rotterdam
Medal record
Representing the Netherlands
European Championships
Gold medal – first place	1934 Magdeburg	4×100 m freestyle

Anna Petronella "Ans or Annie" Timmermans (10 April 1919 – 21 August 1958) was a Dutch swimmer who won a gold medal in the 4 × 100 m freestyle relay at the 1934 European Championships. Two years later she competed in the 400 m freestyle at the 1936 Olympics but failed to reach the final.
