= Olympiapark Schwimmstadion Berlin =

Aquatics venue in Berlin, Germany

Coordinates: 52.5164°N 13.2391°E

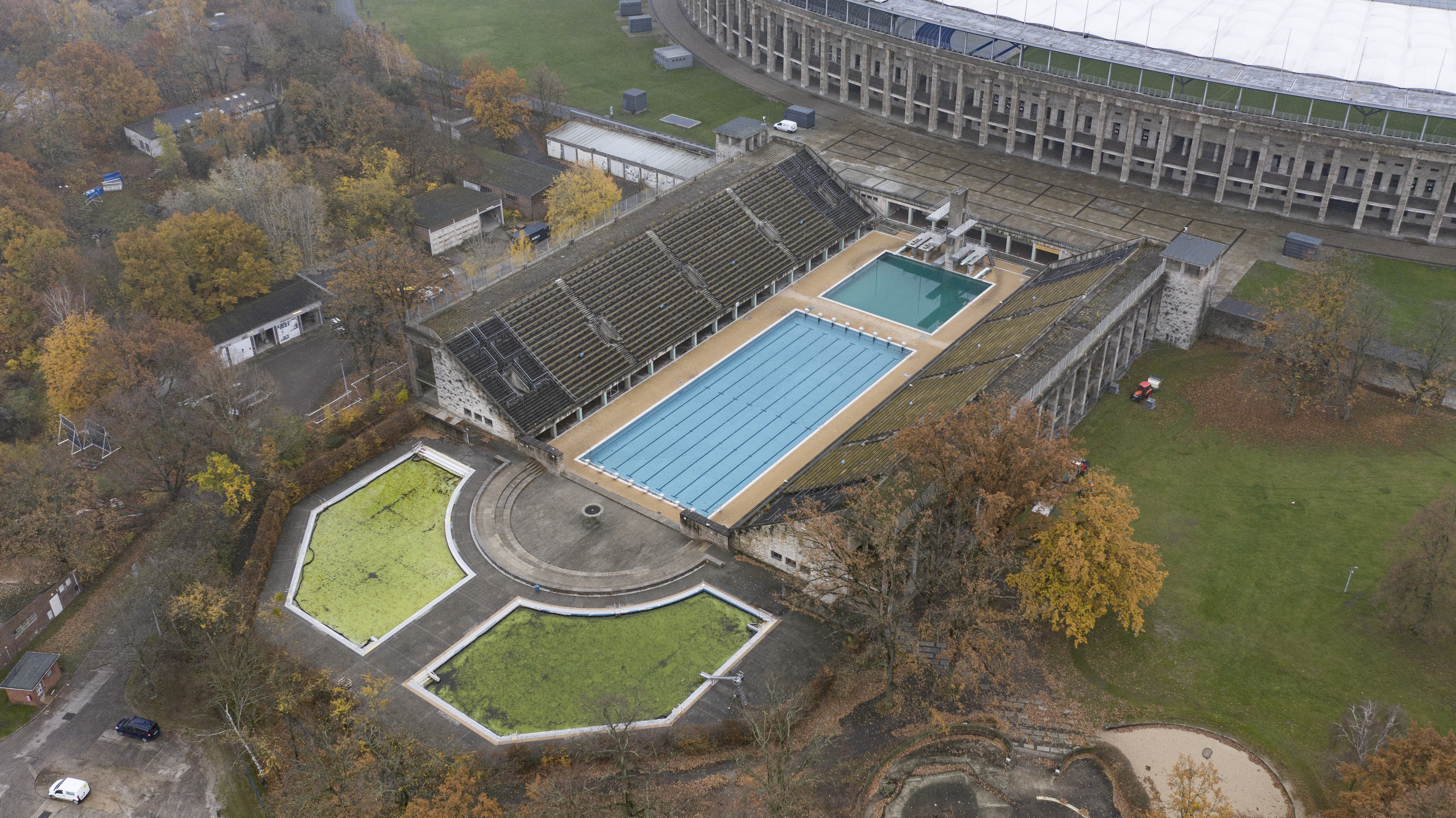
The swimming venue shown in 2019.

Olympiapark Schwimmstadion Berlin (German: Berlin Olympic Swim Stadium) is an aquatics venue located at Olympiapark Berlin in Berlin, Germany constructed for the 1936 Summer Olympics. Located north of the Olympic Stadium it hosted the diving, swimming, water polo, and the swimming part of the modern pentathlon events. A total of 140,231 attended during all competitions. It hosted the World Aquatics Championships in 1978 as well and was a venue of European Maccabi Games 2015.

The stadium's ground level was constructed 13 ft (4.0 m) lower than the top part of the Olympic Stadium. Its swimming pool is 50 m long by 20 m wide, separated into eight lanes. Men's dressing rooms are located under the east stands while women's dressing rooms were located under the west stands. From the swimming pool's north end to the south end, the pool depth increases from 2 m to 2.30 m.

The stadium is constructed of natural limestone. It is still in use as a training facility and for recreational use between May and September each year.

== Gallery ==
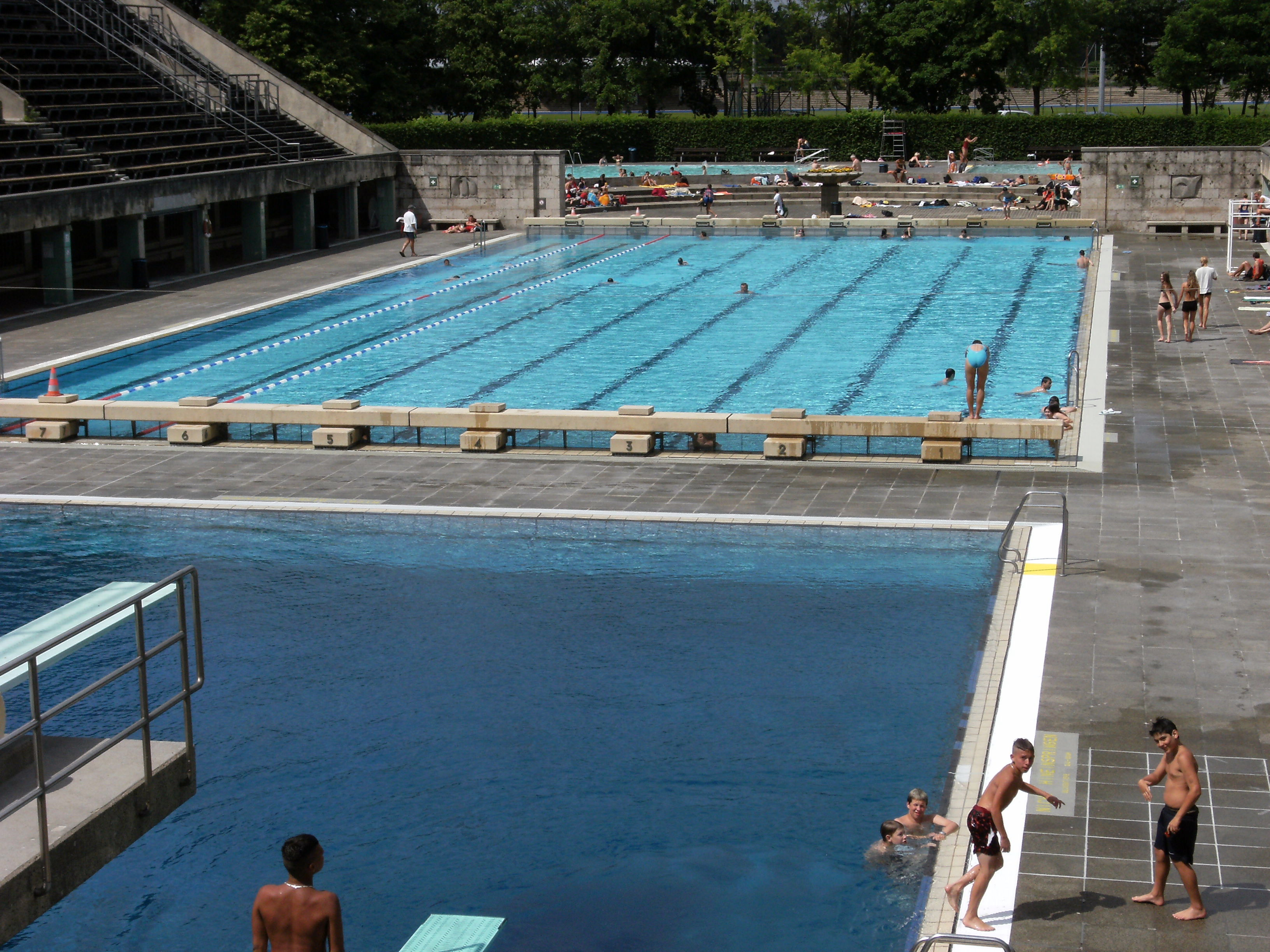
The swimming and diving pools as seen in 2008

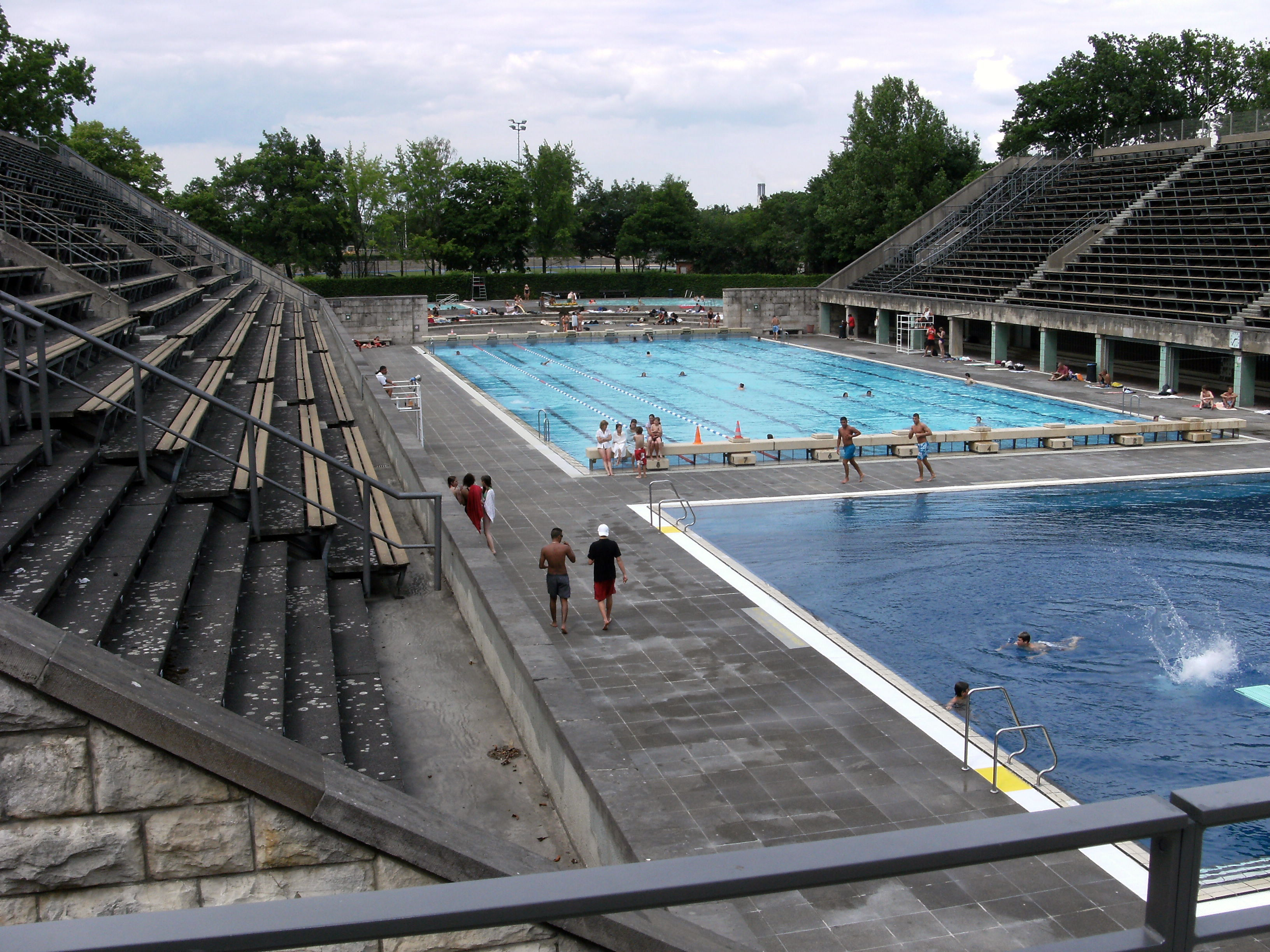
View from the stands

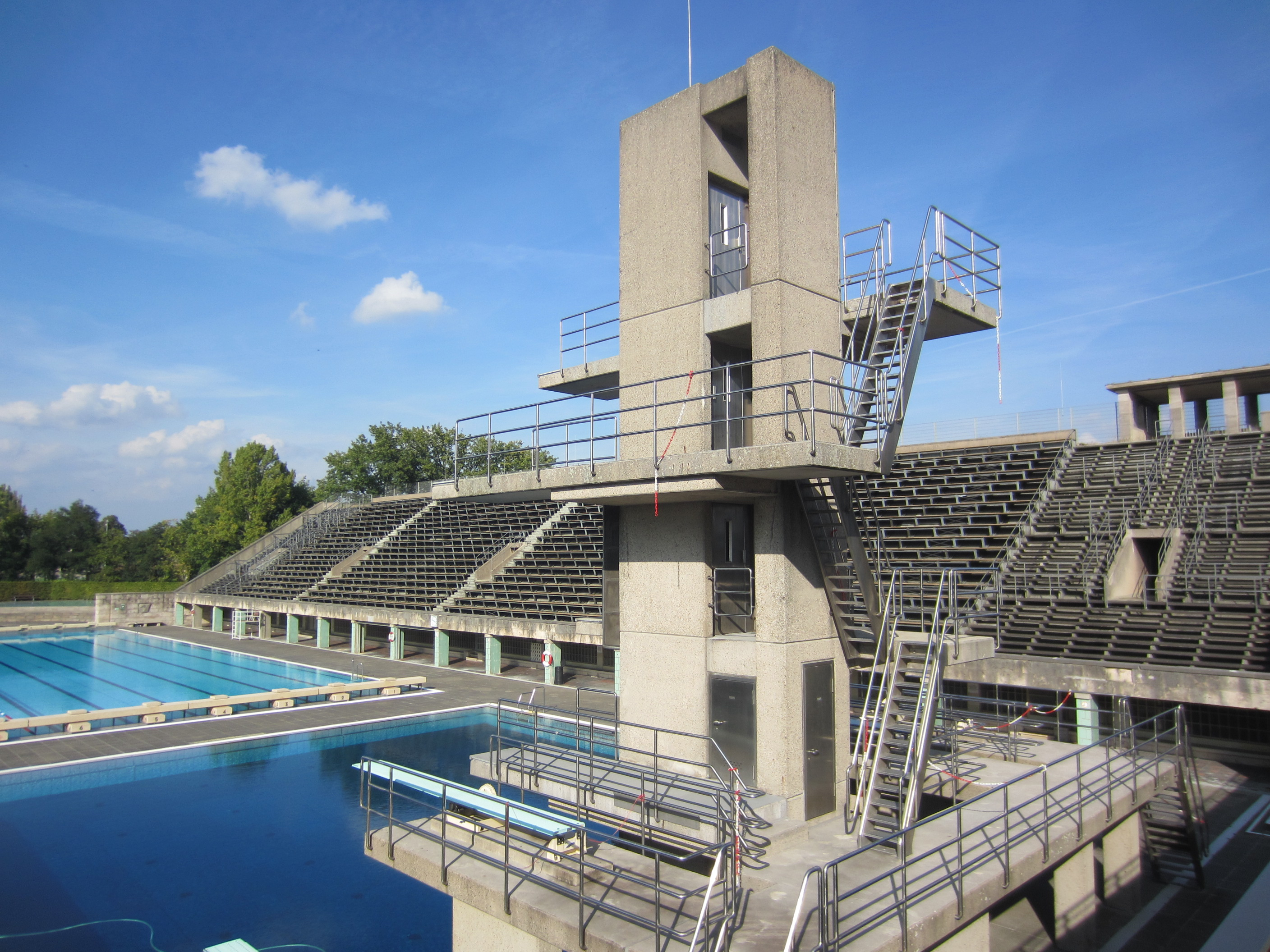
The diving tower
