= Oszkár Abay-Nemes =

Hungarian swimmer (1913–1959)

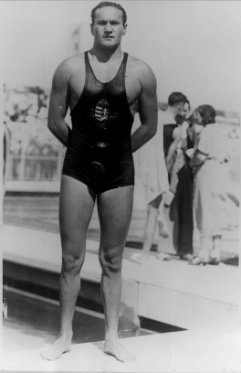

Personal information
- Born: September 22, 1913 Diószeg, Austria-Hungary
- Died: January 30, 1959 (aged 45) Pécs, Hungary

Sport
- Sport: Swimming
Medal record
Representing Hungary
Men's Swimming
Olympic Games
Bronze medal – third place	1936 Berlin	4x200 m freestyle relay

Oszkár Abay-Nemes (22 September 1913 – 30 January 1959) was a Hungarian swimmer who competed in the 1936 Summer Olympics. He was born in Diószeg (now Sládkovičovo, Slovakia).

In the 1936 Olympics, he won a bronze medal in the 4 × 200 m freestyle relay event. He was also seventh in his semifinal of the 100 m freestyle event and did not advance.

Abay-Nemes died on 30 January 1959 in Pécs, at the age of 45.
