= Leni Lohmar =

German swimmer

Personal information
- Born: October 19, 1914
- Died: December 31, 2006 (aged 92)

Sport
- Sport: Swimming
Medal record
Representing Germany
Olympic Games
Silver medal – second place	1936 Berlin	4x100 m freestyle relay

Magdalena "Leni" Lohmar (later Henze) (October 19, 1914 – December 31, 2006) was a German swimmer who competed in the 1936 Summer Olympics.

In the 1936 Olympics she won a silver medal in the 4 × 100 m freestyle relay event. She was also fourth in her first round heat of 100 m freestyle event and did not advance.
