= Ingeborg Schmitz =

German swimmer (1922–1985)

Personal information
- Born: 22 April 1922 Berlin, Germany
- Died: 11 November 1985 (aged 63) Berlin, Germany

Sport
- Sport: Swimming
Medal record
Representing Germany
Olympic Games
Silver medal – second place	1936 Berlin	4x100 m freestyle relay

Ingeborg Schmitz (22 April 1922 – 11 November 1985) was a German swimmer who competed in the 1936 Summer Olympics.

In the 1936 Olympics she won a silver medal in the 4 × 100 m freestyle relay event. She was also fifth in her first round heat of 100 m freestyle event and did not advance.

Schmitz died in Berlin on 11 November 1985, at the age of 63.
