= Magda Lenkei =

Hungarian swimmer (1916–1998)

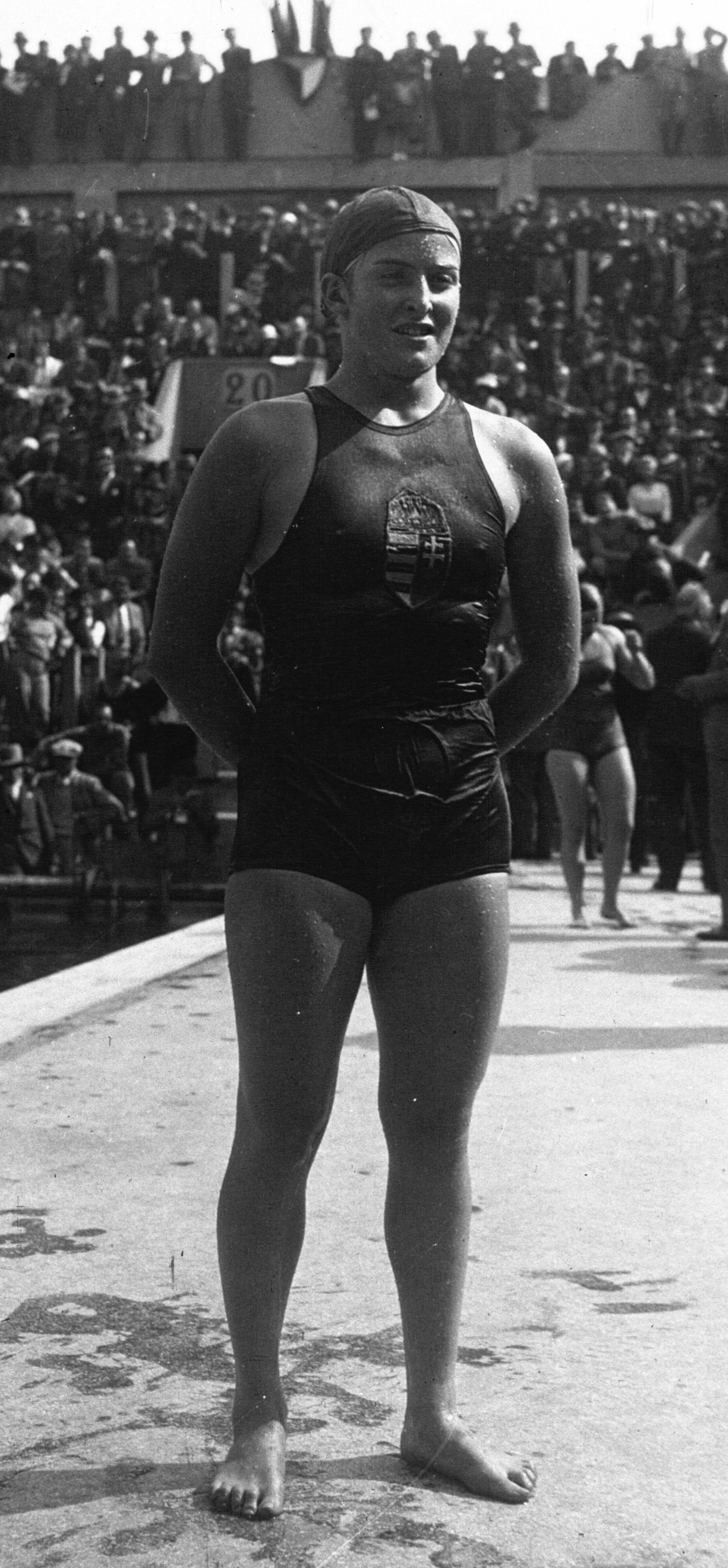
- Magda Lenkei at the 1931 European Championships

Personal information
- Born: 18 August 1916 Budapest, Hungary
- Died: 4 May 1998 (aged 81) France

Sport
- Sport: Swimming
- Club: III. kerületi TVE, Budapest
Medal record
Representing Hungary
European Championships
Bronze medal – third place	1931 Paris	4×100 m freestyle

Magdolna "Magda" Lenkei (later Linzer; 18 August 1916 – 4 May 1998) was a Hungarian swimmer who won a bronze medal in the 4 × 100 m freestyle relay at the 1931 European Championships. She finished fourth in the relay at the 1936 Summer Olympics and failed to reach the final of the 100 m event.
