= Olive McKean =

American swimmer and coach

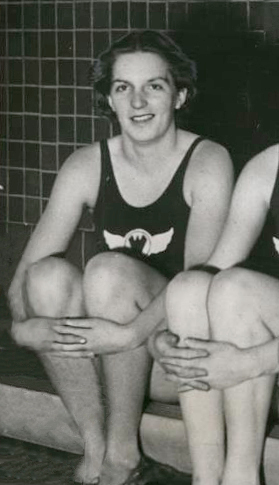
- McKean in 1936

Personal information
- Full name: Mary Olive McKean
- National team: United States
- Born: August 10, 1915 Chehalis, Washington, U.S.
- Died: March 31, 2006 (aged 90) Troutdale, Oregon, U.S.
- Occupations: Swim Coach, Athletic Director
- Spouse: Charles Mucha (1936)

Sport
- Sport: Swimming
- Strokes: Freestyle
- Club: Washington Athletic Club
- Coach: Ray Daughters (WAC)
Medal record
Representing the United States
Olympic Games
Bronze medal – third place	1936 Berlin	4×100 m freestyle

Mary Olive McKean (August 10, 1915 – March 31, 2006), also known by her married name Olive Mucha, was an American competition swimmer, swimming coach, and American record holder, who represented the United States at the 1936 Summer Olympics in Berlin, winning a bronze medal in the 4x100 freestyle relay. She would later serve as a Swim coach and athletic director.

Olive McKean was born August 10, 1915, in Chehalis, Washington. The family moved to Seattle, where Olive did her earliest swimming at Seattle's Green Lake. Ray Daughters, the talented Hall of Fame coach of the Washington Athletic Club, saw Olive in a race and offered her a scholarship to the highly competitive swimming program.

She met her future husband Chuck Mucha, who had played football at the University of Washington, at the Washington Athletic Club. Mucha had been an All-Coast guard for Washington in 1935, and had competed in swimming for the Washington swim team. The couple were married in the Seattle area around October 24, 1936. In 1936 Mucha coached Freshman football at Washington, and would later coach Physical Education and swimming for twelve years at Benson High School in Portland, Oregon, after the couple moved to Portland.

== National competition ==
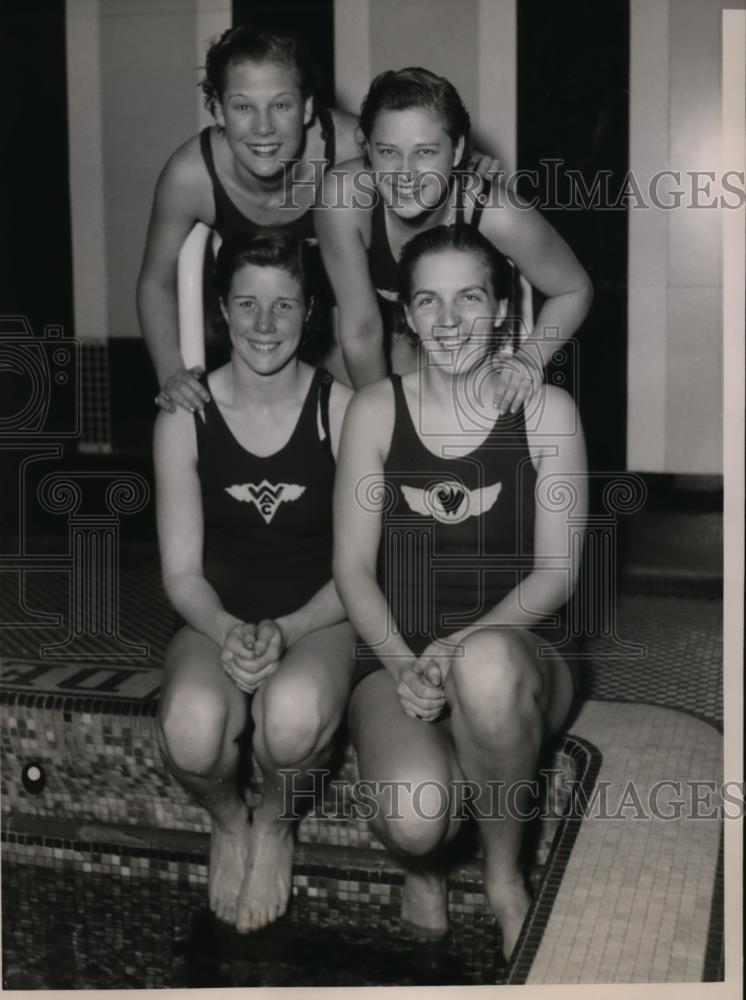
Washington Athletic Relay Team Champions; From Back, L to R; Doris Buckley, Mary Lou Petty, Betty Lea, Olive McKean

McKean won the AAU 100-meter freestyle titles in 1934 and 1935. In indoor competition, she won the AAU 100-yard title in 1934. She swam for Seattle's Washington Athletic Club between the years of 1930 to 1936. The national championship relay team McKean swam with at Washington Athletic included Doris Buckley, Mary Lou Petty and Betty Lea. As a review of her U.S. national competition achievements between 1934 through 1936, she captured five national championships in both the 100-yard and 100-meter freestyle and held American records in the 400-meter and 400-yard freestyle relay from 1935 to 1937.

== 1936 Berlin Olympics ==
She won a bronze medal as a member of the third-place U.S. team in the 4×100-meter freestyle relay at the 1936 Olympics, where she was coached by her former coach at Washington Athletic Club, Ray Daughters, who was Head Coach for the U.S. Women's swimming team that year. With McKean swimming the anchor leg, the U.S. 4x100-meter team finished in a time of 4:40.2, four seconds behind the second place team from Germany finished behind the gold medal winning Dutch team in a close finish. Historically, the American team had most frequently won the event and had on several occasions held the world record prior to the games, but in 1936 the Dutch team had set the World Record and were the heavy favorite.

Individually, McKean finished sixth in the 100-meter freestyle at the 1936 Olympics.

McKean's Washington Athletic Club teammate Mary Lou Petty, also swam with the U.S. team at the 1936 Olympics, and finished fourth in the 400-meter freestyle.

== Post-competition coaching ==
After retiring from swimming, Olive McKean Mucha and Charles Mucha moved to Portland, Oregon in 1939 where she spent a number of years primarily raising children and working as a homemaker. She served as the Women's Athletic Director at the Columbia Athletic Club and later gave lessons and coached at Portland's Multinomah Athletic Club from 1960 through 1980. She would serve as the Aquatics director at the Multinomah Club. Among the athletes she coached at Multinomah were Olympians Carolyn Wood, a 1960 Olympic gold medalist in the 4x100-meter freestyle relay, Don Schollander, a four-time Olympic gold medalist, and Cathy Jamison. Carolyn Wood, a 1960 Olympic gold medalist, worked with McKean shortly before retiring from competition. In June, 1966, McKean worked with Schollander when she served as the Assistant Coach for the U.S. American Athletic Union Team that competed in Moscow in Mid-June, and may have coached Schollander when he lived in Lake Oswego, Oregon, seven miles North of Portland.

== Swimming community service ==
McKean directed swim meets for high school and the Special Olympics. At the international level, she managed the U.S. Swim Team at the 1972 Olympic Games in Munich. During the 1968 Summer Olympics in Mexico City, she served as the assistant manager for the U.S. swimming team. She was the first woman selected to be the president of the Oregon Amateur Athletic Union.

For many years, she played weekly water volleyball at the Multinomah Club, particularly nearing the end of her life. She had a home in Troutdale, Oregon, she had built with her husband Chuck in sight of Oregon's Sandy River where she spent many of her later days watching the river flow.

== Honors ==
She was inducted into the Pacific Northwest Swimming Hall of Fame on July 30, 2005, and attended the ceremony. She garnered a broad array of honors, which included The Phillips 66 Award in 1979, Oregonian Governor Tom McCall's Governors' Award in 1971, and the Girl Scouts Outstanding Women's Award in 1995. The Phillips 66 Award is given every year to recognize a volunteer in Midwestern Swimming.

McKean died at the age of 90 from heart failure in Troutdale, Oregon after a short illness on March 31, 2006. Her husband Charles predeceased her in 1997. She was survived by two daughters and three grandchildren. Both her daughters had been swimmers and swam with the Washington Athletic Club.

== See also ==
- List of Olympic medalists in swimming (women)
