= Rie Mastenbroek =

Dutch swimmer (1919–2003)

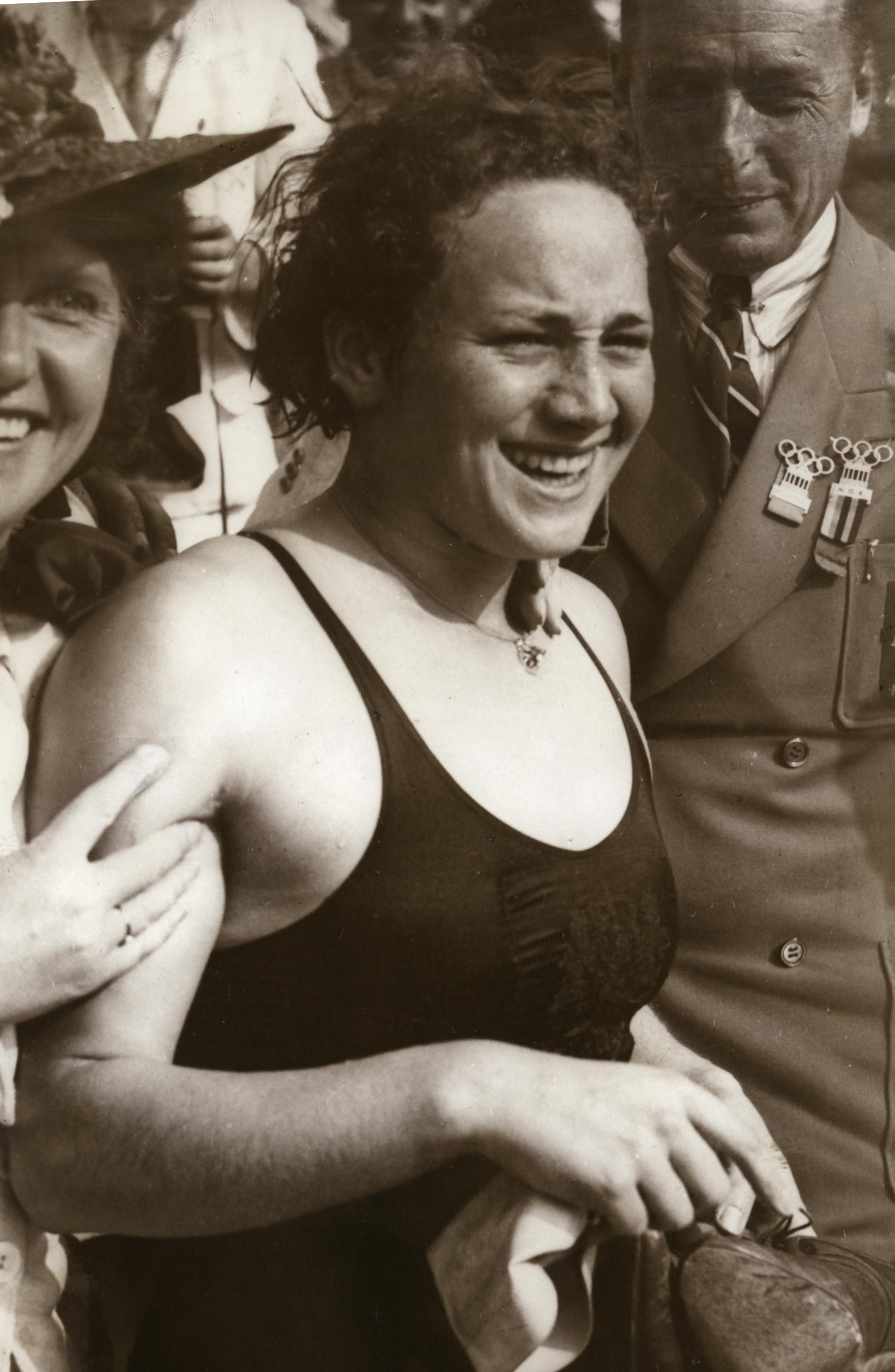

Personal information
- Full name: Hendrika Wilhelmina Mastenbroek
- National team: Netherlands
- Born: 26 February 1919 Rotterdam, Netherlands
- Died: 6 November 2003 (aged 84) Rotterdam, Netherlands

Sport
- Sport: Swimming
- Strokes: Freestyle, backstroke
Medal record
Women's swimming
Representing the Netherlands
Summer Olympics
Gold medal – first place	1936 Berlin	100 m freestyle
Gold medal – first place	1936 Berlin	400 m freestyle
Gold medal – first place	1936 Berlin	4×100 m freestyle
Silver medal – second place	1936 Berlin	100 m backstroke
European Championships
Gold medal – first place	1934 Magdeburg	400 m freestyle
Gold medal – first place	1934 Magdeburg	100 m backstroke
Gold medal – first place	1934 Magdeburg	4×100 m freestyle
Silver medal – second place	1934 Magdeburg	100 m freestyle

Hendrika Wilhelmina "Rie" Mastenbroek (26 February 1919 – 6 November 2003) was a Dutch swimmer and a triple Olympic champion.

== Biography ==
Born in Rotterdam, she started swimming under the coaching of "Ma" Braun, who had coached her daughter to an Olympic gold medal in 1928. In 1934, Mastenbroek won three gold medals and a silver at the European Championships.

She repeated that performance at the 1936 Summer Olympics, aged only 17, winning the 100 m freestyle, 400 m freestyle and the 4×100 m freestyle. In the 100 m backstroke, she finished second behind teammate Nida Senff. (Senff missed a turning point and had to swim back before completing the last 50 m. She nevertheless beat Mastenbroek thanks to an outstanding last leg.)

The following year she became a swimming instructor, thereby losing her amateur status and becoming ineligible for competition.

During her career she broke nine world records (six for backstroke and three for freestyle). In 1968 she was inducted into the International Swimming Hall of Fame. In 1997 she received the Olympic Order.

She died at age 84 in Rotterdam. After her death, Stichting Aquarius named the Rie Mastenbroek Trophy after her.

== See also ==
- List of members of the International Swimming Hall of Fame
