= Rowing at the 1936 Summer Olympics =

Rowing at the Games of the XI Olympiad
- Venue: Langer See
- Dates: 11–14 August 1936
- Competitors: 313 from 24 nations

Rowing at the 1936 Summer Olympics featured seven events. The competitions were held from 11 to 14 August on a regatta course at Grünau on the Langer See.

The competition was dominated by the hosts, Germany, who medaled in every event and took five of the seven gold medals. The final race, men's eights, was won by a working-class United States team from the University of Washington who, in what had become their trademark, started slow and outsprinted the competition to an exceedingly close finish, with only one second separating the top three finishers at the end of a six-and-a-half minute race. This event is chronicled in The Boys in the Boat written by Daniel James Brown.

== Medal summary ==
Event	Gold	Silver	Bronze
Single sculls	Gustav Schäfer; Germany	Josef Hasenöhrl; Austria	Dan Barrow; United States
Double sculls	Jack Beresford and Dick Southwood; Great Britain	Willi Kaidel and Joachim Pirsch; Germany	Roger Verey and Jerzy Ustupski; Poland
Coxless pairs	Willi Eichhorn and Hugo Strauß; Germany	Harry Larsen and Richard Olsen; Denmark	Horacio Podestá and Julio Curatella; Argentina
Coxed pair	Germany; Gerhard Gustmann; Herbert Adamski; Dieter Arend	Italy; Almiro Bergamo; Guido Santin; Luciano Negrini	France; Marceau Fourcade; Georges Tapie; Noël Vandernotte
Coxless four	Germany; Rudolf Eckstein; Anton Rom; Martin Karl; Wilhelm Menne	Great Britain; Martin Bristow; Alan Barrett; Peter Jackson; John Sturrock	Switzerland; Hermann Betschart; Hans Homberger; Alex Homberger; Karl Schmid
Coxed four	Germany; Hans Maier; Walter Volle; Ernst Gaber; Paul Söllner; Fritz Bauer	Switzerland; Hermann Betschart; Hans Homberger; Alex Homberger; Karl Schmid; Rolf Spring	France; Fernand Vandernotte; Marcel Vandernotte; Jean Cosmat; Marcel Chauvigné; Noël Vandernotte
Eight	United States; Herbert Morris; Charles Day; Gordon Adam; John White; James McMillin; George Hunt; Joe Rantz; Donald Hume; Robert Moch	Italy; Guglielmo Del Bimbo; Dino Barsotti; Oreste Grossi; Enzo Bartolini; Mario Checcacci; Dante Secchi; Ottorino Quaglierini; Enrico Garzelli; Cesare Milani	Germany; Alfred Rieck; Helmut Radach; Hans Kuschke; Heinz Kaufmann; Gerd Völs; Werner Loeckle; Hans-Joachim Hannemann; Herbert Schmidt; Wilhelm Mahlow

== Participating nations ==
A total of 313 rowers from 24 nations competed at the Berlin Games:

- Argentina (3)
- Australia (12)
- Austria (9)
- Belgium (7)
- Brazil (21)
- Canada (10)
- Czechoslovakia (17)
- Denmark (16)
- Estonia (1)
- France (19)
- Germany (26)
- Great Britain (18)
- Hungary (23)
- Italy (22)
- Japan (16)
- Netherlands (11)
- Norway (1)
- Poland (11)
- South Africa (1)
- Sweden (5)
- Switzerland (16)
- United States (26)
- Uruguay (8)
- Yugoslavia (14)

== Medal table ==
Rank	Nation	Gold	Silver	Bronze	Total
1	Germany	5	1	1	7
2	Great Britain	1	1	0	2
3	United States	1	0	1	2
4	Italy	0	2	0	2
5	Switzerland	0	1	1	2
6	Austria	0	1	0	1
6	Denmark	0	1	0	1
8	France	0	0	2	2
9	Argentina	0	0	1	1
9	Poland	0	0	1	1
Totals (10 entries)		7	7	7	21
