= United States at the 1936 Summer Olympics =

- Flag of the United States
- IOC code: USA
- NOC: United States Olympic Committee

in Berlin
- Competitors: 359 (313 men and 46 women) in 21 sports
- Flag bearer: Al Jochim
- Medals Ranked 2nd: Gold 24 Silver 21 Bronze 12 Total 57

Summer Olympics appearances (overview)
- 1896; 1900; 1904; 1908; 1912; 1920; 1924; 1928; 1932; 1936; 1948; 1952; 1956; 1960; 1964; 1968; 1972; 1976; 1980; 1984; 1988; 1992; 1996; 2000; 2004; 2008; 2012; 2016; 2020; 2024

Other related appearances
- 1906 Intercalated Games

The United States, the previous host of the 1932 Summer Olympics in Los Angeles, California, competed at the 1936 Summer Olympics in Berlin, Germany. The Americans finished second in the medal table behind the hosts. 359 competitors, 313 men and 46 women, took part in 127 events in 21 sports.

== Medalists ==
=== Athletics ===
Men's events

- Archie Williams – Won 1 gold medal in the 400 m race.
- Jesse Owens – Won 4 gold medals in the 100 m race, the 200 m race, the long jump, and the 4 × 100 m relay team.
- John Woodruff – Won 1 gold medal in the 800 m race.
- Mack Robinson – Won 1 silver medal in the 200 m race.
- Ralph Metcalfe – Won 1 gold medal in the 4 × 100 m relay team and 1 silver medal in the 100 m race.
- James LuValle – Won 1 bronze medal in the 400 m race.
- Glenn Cunningham – Won 1 silver medal in the 1500 m race.
- Forrest Towns – Won 1 gold medal in the 110 m hurdles.
- Fritz Pollard – Won 1 bronze medal in the 110 m hurdles.
- Glenn Hardin – Won 1 gold medal in the 400 m hurdles.
- Foy Draper – Won 1 gold medal in the 4 × 100 m relay.
- Frank Wykoff – Won 1 gold medal in the 4 × 100 m relay.
- Eddie O'Brien – Won 1 silver medal in the 4 × 400 m relay.
- Harold Cagle – Won 1 silver medal in the 4 × 400 m relay.
- Robert Young – Won 1 silver medal in the 4 × 400 m relay.
- Alfred Fitch – Won 1 silver medal in the 4 × 400 m relay.
- Cornelius Johnson – Won 1 gold medal in the high jump.
- Dave Albritton – Won 1 silver medal in the high jump.
- Delos Thurber – Won 1 bronze medal in the high jump.
- Earle Meadows – Won 1 gold medal in the pole vault.
- Ken Carpenter – Won 1 gold medal in the discus.
- Gordon Dunn – Won 1 silver medal in the discus.
- Glenn Morris – Won 1 gold medal in the decathlon.
- Bob Clark – Won 1 silver medal in the decathlon.
- Jack Parker – Won 1 bronze medal in the decathlon.

=== Basketball ===
The men's basketball team won the gold medal. The players were as follows:

- Sam Balter
- Ralph Bishop
- Joe Fortenberry
- Tex Gibbons
- Francis Johnson
- Carl Knowles
- Frank Lubin
- Art Mollner
- Donald Piper
- Jack Ragland
- Willard Schmidt
- Carl Shy
- Duane Swanson
- Bill Wheatley

=== Boxing ===
- Jack Wilson – Won 1 silver medal in the bantamweight.
- Louis Laurie – Won 1 bronze medal in the flyweight.

=== Canoeing ===
- Ernest Riedel – Won 1 bronze medal in K1 10000 meters.

=== Football (soccer) ===
Results

- U.S. 0–1 Italy

Roster

- Charles Altemose
- Frank Bartkus
- Edward Begley
- Julius Chmielewski
- James Crockett
- William Fiedler
- Andrew Gajda
- Frank Greinert
- Fred Lutkefedder
- George Nemchik
- Peter Pietras
- Francis Ryan
- Fred Zbikowski
- Fritz Stoll
- Rob Denton

=== Rowing ===
The men's eight-man team won the gold medal. The team consisted of the following rowers:

- Herbert Morris
- Charles Day
- Gordon Adam
- John White
- James McMillin
- George Hunt
- Joe Rantz
- Don Hume
- Robert Moch

=== Women competitors ===
==== Athletics ====
- Helen Stephens – Won 2 gold medals in the 100 m race and the 4 × 100 m relay.
- Harriet Bland – Won 1 gold medal in the 4 × 100 m relay.
- Betty Robinson – Won 1 gold medal in the 4 × 100 m relay.
- Annette Rogers – Won 1 gold medal in the 4 × 100 m relay.

=== Swimming ===
- Famous swimmer Eleanor Holm was suspended by Avery Brundage over "a drinking episode" while she was traveling to Germany together with other American athletes. She had swum in the 1928 and 1932 Olympics, winning gold in 1932. Holm's Olympic teammates unsuccessfully petitioned to have her dismissal overturned. She was the top favorite for the 100-meter backstroke event, and watched from the stands as the gold medal went to Dutch swimmer Nida Senff. Decades later, Holm told Olympic sprinter Dave Sime that Brundage held a grudge from an incident in which he propositioned her, and she turned him down. Brundage was one of the most controversial figures in the US Olympic history, known for his racist and sexist remarks and actions and also for appeasing dictatorships, such as Nazi Germany and the Soviet Union.

== Athletics ==
- Louis Zamperini – long-distance runner competing in the 5000-meter event.
- Don Lash – long-distance runner competing in the 5000-meter and 10,000-meter events.
- Ellison Brown – marathon runner.

== Cycling ==
Six cyclists represented the United States in 1936.

Individual road race

- Albert Byrd
- Charles Morton
- Paul Nixon
- John Sinibaldi

Team road race

- Albert Byrd
- Charles Morton
- Paul Nixon
- John Sinibaldi

Sprint

- Al Sellinger

Time trial

- Al Sellinger

Tandem

- William Logan
- Al Sellinger

Team pursuit

- Albert Byrd
- William Logan
- Charles Morton
- John Sinibaldi

== Diving ==
Men

Athlete	Event	Final	
Athlete	Event	Points	Rank
Richard Degener	3 m springboard	163.57	1st place, gold medalist(s)
Alan Greene	3 m springboard	146.29	3rd place, bronze medalist(s)
Marshall Wayne	3 m springboard	159.56	2nd place, silver medalist(s)
Frank Kurtz	10 m platform	108.61	5
Elbert Root	10 m platform	110.60	2nd place, silver medalist(s)
Marshall Wayne	10 m platform	113.58	1st place, gold medalist(s)

Women

Athlete	Event	Final	
Athlete	Event	Points	Rank
Marjorie Gestring	3 m springboard	89.27	1st place, gold medalist(s)
Dorothy Poynton-Hill	3 m springboard	82.36	3rd place, bronze medalist(s)
Katherine Rawls	3 m springboard	88.35	2nd place, silver medalist(s)
Velma Dunn	10 m platform	33.63	2nd place, silver medalist(s)
Cornelia Gilissen	10 m platform	30.47	5
Dorothy Poynton-Hill	10 m platform	33.93	1st place, gold medalist(s)

== Fencing ==
22 fencers represented the United States in 1936.

Men's foil

- Joe Levis
- Hugh Alessandroni
- Bill Pecora

Men's team foil

- Joe Levis, Hugh Alessandroni, John Potter, John Hurd, Warren Dow, Bill Pecora

Men's épée

- Frederick Weber
- Gustave Heiss
- Frank Righeimer

Men's team épée

- Frank Righeimer, Thomas Sands, Tracy Jaeckel, Gustave Heiss, José Raoul de Capriles, Andrew Boyd

Men's sabre

- John Huffman
- Peter Bruder
- Norman Cohn-Armitage

Men's team sabre

- Peter Bruder, Miguel de Capriles, Bela De Nagy, John Huffman, Samuel Stewart, Norman Cohn-Armitage

Women's foil

- Marion Lloyd
- Dorothy Locke
- Joanna de Tuscan

== Gymnastics ==
16 gymnasts, 8 men and 8 women, represented the United States in 1936.

Men's team

- Frank Cumiskey
- Kenny Griffin
- Frank Haubold
- Al Jochim
- Fred Meyer
- Chet Phillips
- Artie Pitt
- George Wheeler

Women's team

- Jennie Caputo
- Connie Caruccio-Lenz
- Margaret Duff
- Irma Haubold
- Marie Kibler
- Ada Lunardoni
- Adelaide Meyer
- Mary Wright

== Modern pentathlon ==
Three pentathletes represented the United States in 1936.

- Charles Leonard
- Alfred Starbird
- Frederick Weber

== Rowing ==
The United States had 26 rowers participate in all seven rowing events in 1936.

Men's single sculls

- Dan Barrow

Men's double sculls

- John Houser
- Bill Dugan

Men's coxless pair

- Harry Sharkey
- George Dahm

Men's coxed pair

- Tom Curran
- Joe Dougherty
- George Loveless (cox)

Men's coxless four

- James Thomson
- Eugene Fruehauf
- George Hague
- Alfred Sapecky

Men's coxed four

- William Haskins
- Roger W. Cutler Jr.
- Paul Austin
- Robert B. Cutler
- Edward Bennett (cox)

Men's eight

- Herbert Morris
- Charles Day
- Gordon Adam
- John White
- James McMillin
- George Hunt
- Joe Rantz
- Don Hume
- Robert Moch (cox)

== Sailing ==
US Athletes:

2-person Keelboat, open - Star Class

William G. Waterhouse and Woody Metcalf.

== Shooting ==
Six shooters represented the United States in 1936.

25 m rapid fire pistol

- Ingals Fisher
- Morris Doob
- Dean Hudnutt

50 m pistol

- Elliott Jones
- William Riedell
- Ralph Marshall

== Swimming ==
Ranks given are within the heat.

Men

Athlete	Event	Heat		Semifinal		Final	
Athlete	Event	Time	Rank	Time	Rank	Time	Rank
Peter Fick	100 m freestyle	57.6 OR	1 Q	58.2	3 Q	59.7	6
Arthur Highland	100 m freestyle	59.9	2 Q	59.4	4	Did not advance	
Arthur Lindegren	100 m freestyle	58.3	1 Q	58.7	3 Q	59.9	7
Ralph Flanagan	400 m freestyle	4:54.7	2 Q	4:49.9	2 Q	4:52.7	4
John Macionis	400 m freestyle	4:57.1	2 Q	4:56.4	4	Did not advance	
Jack Medica	400 m freestyle	4:55.9	1 Q	4:48.2	=2 Q	4:44.5 OR	1st place, gold medalist(s)
Jim Cristy	1500 m freestyle	20:26.5	1 Q	20:25.8	4	Did not advance	
Ralph Flanagan	1500 m freestyle	19:49.9	2 Q	19:59.4	2 Q	19:54.8	5
Jack Medica	1500 m freestyle	19:55.5	1 Q	19:42.8	1 Q	19:34.0	2nd place, silver medalist(s)
Taylor Drysdale	100 m backstroke	1:09.0	1 Q	1:08.6	1 Q	1:09.4	4
Adolph Kiefer	100 m backstroke	1:06.9 OR	1 Q	1:06.8 OR	1 Q	1:05.9 OR	1st place, gold medalist(s)
Al Vande Weghe	100 m backstroke	1:10.6	2 Q	1:08.6	2 Q	1:07.7	2nd place, silver medalist(s)
John Higgins	200 m breaststroke	2:48.8	1 Q	2:44.0	2 Q	2:45.2	4
Jack Kasley	200 m breaststroke	2:54.4	3 Q	2:53.4	6	Did not advance	
Ray Kaye	200 m breaststroke	2:48.5	3 Q	2:49.2	4	Did not advance	
Ralph Flanagan; John Macionis; Paul Wolf; Jack Medica; Ralph Gilman*; Charles Hutter*	4 × 200 m freestyle relay	—N/a		9:10.4	1 Q	9:03.0	2nd place, silver medalist(s)

*Swimmers who participated in the semifinals only and did not receive medals.

Women

Athlete	Event	Heat		Semifinal		Final	
Athlete	Event	Time	Rank	Time	Rank	Time	Rank
Bernice Lapp	100 m freestyle	1:09.0	1 Q	1:09.6	4	Did not advance	
Olive McKean	100 m freestyle	1:09.3	3 Q	1:08.9	3 Q	1:08.4	6
Katherine Rawls	100 m freestyle	1:08.5	3 Q	1:08.5	3 Q	1:08.7	7
Mary Lou Petty	400 m freestyle	6:16.6	3 Q	5:45.9	4 q	5:32.2	4
Lenore Wingard	400 m freestyle	5:34.0	2 Q	5:42.2	2 Q	5:29.0	3rd place, bronze medalist(s)
Alice Bridges	100 m backstroke	1:19.2	1 Q	1:20.4	3 Q	1:19.4	3rd place, bronze medalist(s)
Edith Motridge	100 m backstroke	1:21.0	1 Q	1:19.1	2 Q	1:19.6	4
Iris Cummings	200 m breaststroke	3:21.9	4	Did not advance			
Ann Govednik	200 m breaststroke	3:25.3	5	Did not advance			
Dorothy Schiller	200 m breaststroke	3:17.4	5 q	3:18.5	7	Did not advance	
Katherine Rawls; Bernice Lapp; Mavis Freeman; Olive McKean; Elizabeth Ryan*	4 × 100 m freestyle relay	—N/a		4:47.1	1 Q	4:40.2	3rd place, bronze medalist(s)

*Swimmers who participated in the semifinals only and did not receive medals.
