= Rowing at the 1936 Summer Olympics – Men's coxless four =

Men's coxless fours at the Games of the XI Olympiad
- Date: 12–14 August 1936
- Competitors: 36 from 9 nations

Medalists
1st place, gold medalist(s)		Rudolf Eckstein; Anton Rom; Martin Karl; Wilhelm Menne	Germany
2nd place, silver medalist(s)		Martin Bristow; Alan Barrett; Peter Jackson; John Sturrock	Great Britain
3rd place, bronze medalist(s)		Hermann Betschart; Hans Homberger; Alex Homberger; Karl Schmid	Switzerland

The men's coxless fours competition at the 1936 Summer Olympics in Berlin took place at Grünau on the Langer See.

== Schedule ==
Date	Round
12 August 1936	Heats
13 August 1936	Semifinal
14 August 1936	Final

== Results ==
=== Heats ===
First boat of each heat qualified to the final, remainder goes to the semifinal.

==== Heat 1 ====
Rank	Rowers	Country	Time	Notes
1	Rudolf Eckstein; Anton Rom; Martin Karl; Wilhelm Menne	Germany	6:22.5	Q
2	Rudolf Höpfler; Camillo Winkler; Wilhelm Pichler; Hans Binder	Austria	6:32.1	
3	Knud Olsen; Keld Karise; Bjørner Drøger; Emil Boje Jensen	Denmark	6:36.8	
4	Ferenc Dobos; Frigyes Pabsz; Tibor Vadai; Gyula Halmay	Hungary	6:40.7	
5	James Thomson; Eugene Fruehauf; George Hague; Alfred Sapecky	United States	6:41.4	

==== Heat 2 ====
Rank	Rowers	Country	Time	Notes
1	Hermann Betschart; Hans Homberger; Alex Homberger; Karl Schmid	Switzerland	6:27.2	Q
2	Martin Bristow; Alan Barrett; Peter Jackson; John Sturrock	Great Britain	6:30.8	
3	Antonio Ghiardello; Luigi Luxardo; Aldo Pellizzoni; Francesco Pittaluga	Italy	6:34.5	
4	Mak Schoorl; Flip Regout; Hotse Bartlema; Simon de Wit	Netherlands	6:46.0	

=== Semifinal ===
First two qualify to the final.

==== Heat 1 ====
Rank	Rowers	Country	Time	Notes
1	Rudolf Höpfler; Camillo Winkler; Wilhelm Pichler; Hans Binder	Austria	7:23.4	Q
2	Knud Olsen; Keld Karise; Bjørner Drøger; Emil Boje Jensen	Denmark	7:27.6	Q
3	James Thomson; Eugene Fruehauf; George Hague; Alfred Sapecky	United States	7:31.5	

==== Heat 2 ====
Rank	Rowers	Country	Time	Notes
1	Martin Bristow; Alan Barrett; Peter Jackson; John Sturrock	Great Britain	7:27.4	Q
2	Antonio Ghiardello; Luigi Luxardo; Aldo Pellizzoni; Francesco Pittaluga	Italy	7:33.9	Q
3	Ferenc Dobos; Frigyes Pabsz; Tibor Vadai; Gyula Halmay	Hungary	7:57.0	

=== Final ===
Rank	Rowers	Country	Time	Notes
1st place, gold medalist(s)	Rudolf Eckstein; Anton Rom; Martin Karl; Wilhelm Menne	Germany	7:01.8	
2nd place, silver medalist(s)	Martin Bristow; Alan Barrett; Peter Jackson; John Sturrock	Great Britain	7:06.5	
3rd place, bronze medalist(s)	Hermann Betschart; Hans Homberger; Alex Homberger; Karl Schmid	Switzerland	7:10.6	
4	Antonio Ghiardello; Luigi Luxardo; Aldo Pellizzoni; Francesco Pittaluga	Italy	7:12.4	
5	Rudolf Höpfler; Camillo Winkler; Wilhelm Pichler; Hans Binder	Austria	7:20.5	
6	Knud Olsen; Keld Karise; Bjørner Drøger; Emil Boje Jensen	Denmark	7:26.3	
