= Peter H. Jackson =

English rower (1912–1983)

Peter Jackson
Personal information
- Nationality: British (English)
- Born: 15 November 1912 Market Harborough, England
- Died: 5 February 1983 (aged 70) Cirencester, England

Sport
- Sport: Rowing
- Club: London Rowing Club
Medal record
Men's rowing
Representing Great Britain
Olympic Games
Silver medal – second place	1936 Berlin	Coxless four
Representing England
British Empire Games
Gold medal – first place	1938 Sydney	Eight
Silver medal – second place	1938 Sydney	Single sculls

Peter Herbert "Jacko" Jackson (15 November 1912 – 5 February 1983) was a rower from England who competed at the 1936 Summer Olympics.

== Biography ==
Jackson rowed for London Rowing Club and was also a competitive sculler. and in 1932 was a member of the crew that won the Thames Challenge Cup at Henley Royal Regatta. In 1933 his crew won the Grand Challenge Cup at Henley. He raced in skiffs for The Skiff Club and in 1934, partnering Jock Wise won the Gentlemen's Double Sculls at the Skiff Championships Regatta. In the single scull, he won the Wingfield Sculls in 1935 and 1936.

He was a member of the coxless four crew with Martin Bristow, Alan Barrett and John Sturrock who won a silver medal for Great Britain rowing at the 1936 Summer Olympics.

He represented England at the 1938 British Empire Games in Sydney, Australia, where he competed in the eights event, winning a gold medal. In the same games, he won the silver medal rowing in the single scull competition.

Also in 1938, he won the Wingfield Sculls for the third time.

Jackson was Commanding Officer of the 10th Royal Hussars regiment.

When Jackson asked his CO permission for time off for the games, the senior rank was reluctant because leave had already been granted for Henley – so Peter picked him up and held him over the banister of the stairwell until he agreed

Jackson died in Cirencester, Gloucestershire aged 70.

== Achievements ==
Olympic Games

- 1936 – Silver, Coxless Fours

British Empire Games

- 1938 – Silver, Single Sculls (lost to Herb Turner, AUS)
- 1938 – Bronze, Double Sculls – (exhibition event)
- 1938 – Gold, Eights

Wingfield Sculls

- 1935
- 1936
- 1938

Henley Royal Regatta

- 1932 – Thames Challenge Cup (racing for London Rowing Club)
- 1933 – Grand Challenge Cup (racing for London Rowing Club)
- 1938 – Grand Challenge Cup (racing for London Rowing Club)

Head of the River Race

- 1933
- 1934
- 1935
- 1936
- 1939

Skiff Championships

- 1934 Gentlemen's Double Sculls (With C W Wise)
