= Briano =

Briano is an Italian surname originating from Savona. Possible origins of the name include deriving from the medieval name “Brianus” and from the archaic Provençal “Brian”, meaning “Small” or “Maggot”. Notable people with the surname include:

- Giacomo Briano (1589–1649), Polish Jesuit and architect
- Louis Briano (1891–1966), Monegasque sport shooter
- Mauro Briano (born 1975), Italian footballer
- Renata Briano (born 1964), Italian politician
