= Martin Bristow =

British doctor and rower

Olympic medal record

Men's rowing
Silver medal – second place	1936 Berlin	Coxless four

Thomas Richard Martin Bristow (15 November 1913 – 31 July 2007) was a British medical doctor and rower who competed in the 1936 Summer Olympics.

He was known as Martin Bristow and was educated at Dulwich College and Pembroke College, Cambridge. Rowing at Cambridge he won four headships from 1932 to 1935, and was a member of the Cambridge crew in the 1935 Boat Race, which Cambridge won by 4 lengths. He was in the winning Pembroke College crew in the Grand Challenge Cup at Henley Royal Regatta in 1935. Rowing at the 1936 Summer Olympics, he was a member of the British boat with Alan Barrett, Peter Jackson and John Sturrock which won the silver medal in the coxless fours event. He was a member of London Rowing Club and was in crew that won the Grand Challenge Cup at Henley in 1938.

Bristow qualified at St Thomas's Hospital. He later specialised in anaesthesia.

Bristow died in Estepona at the age of 93.

== See also ==
- List of Cambridge University Boat Race crews
