= Pietras =

Pietras is a Polish given name and a surname. , a diminutive from the given name Pietr, 'Peter'. Archaic feminine forms: Pietrasowa (by husband), Pietrasówna (by father). Notable people with the surname include:

- Matthew Christopher Pietras, personal assistant and a thief
- Peter Pietras (April 21, 1908 – April 15, 1993) was a U.S. soccer player
