= Pittaluga =

Pittaluga is an Italian surname, derived from Genoese pitâ l'ûga, 'to pick grapes' or 'to enjoy the taste of grapes'. Notable people with the surname include:

- Fabio Pittaluga (born 1965), Italian archer
- Francesco Pittaluga (1913–2016), Italian rower
- Gustavo Pittaluga (doctor) (1876–1956), Italian doctor and biologist
- Gustavo Pittaluga (composer) (1906–1975), Spanish composer
- Stefano Pittaluga (1887–1932), Italian film producer

== See also ==
- Michele Pittaluga International Classical Guitar Competition
- Pitaluga
- Piccaluga
