= Curatella (surname) =

Curatella is an Italian surname. Notable people with the surname include:

- Julio Curatella (1911–1995), Argentine rower
- Pablo Curatella (1891–1962), Argentine sculptor
