= Edward Kobyliński =

Polish rower (1908–1992)

Eduardo Kobylinski
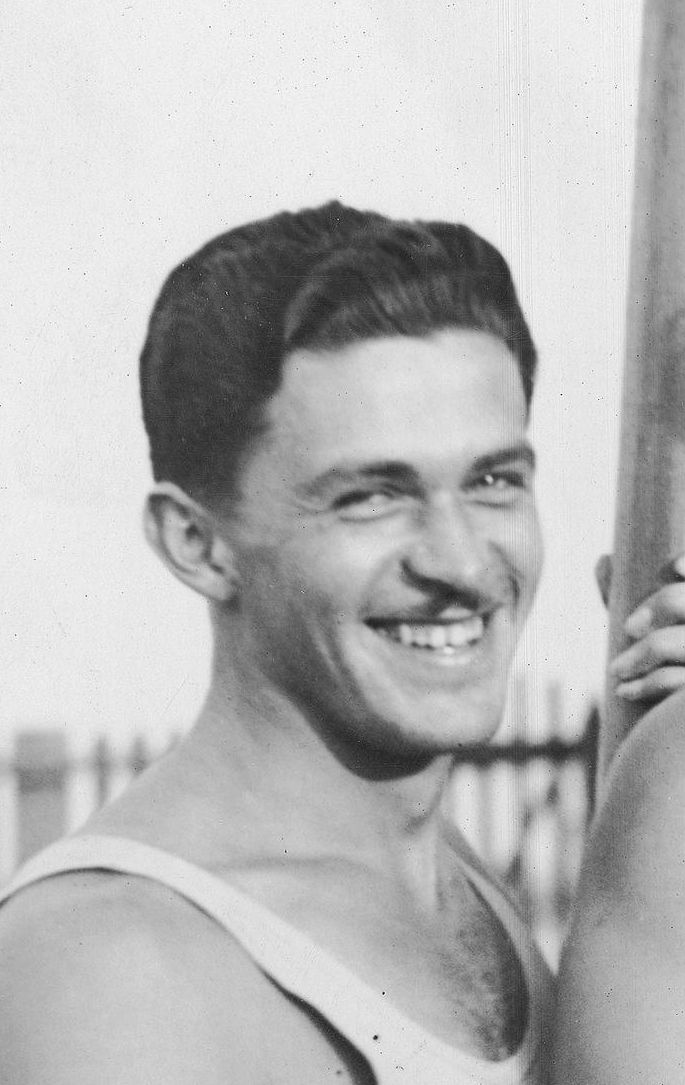
- Kobyliński in 1932

Personal information
- Born: Eduardo Kobylinski; 15 January 1908 Warsaw, Congress Poland, Russian Empire
- Died: 7 September 1992 (aged 84) Warsaw, Poland
- Height: 180 cm (5 ft 11 in)
- Weight: 74 kg (163 lb)

Sport
- Sport: Rowing
- Club: AZS Warszawa; WTW Warszawa
Medal record
Men's rowing
Representing Poland
Olympic Games
Bronze medal – third place	1932 Los Angeles	Coxed four

Prus Edward Kobyliński (15 January 1908 – 7 September 1992) was a Polish rower who competed in the 1932 Summer Olympics and in the 1936 Summer Olympics.

Kobyliński was born in Warsaw in 1908. He started rowing in the late 1920s after having previously been a 400 m runner. In 1932 he won the bronze medal as member of the Polish boat in the coxed four competition. Four years later he finished sixth with his partner Ryszard Borzuchowski in the coxless pair event.

He fought in the September Campaign of World War II, his last battle was battle of Kock. He was involved in rebuilding rowing in Poland after the war and led the national team in 1953 and 1954. He acted as a rowing judge at the Summer Olympics in 1972 and 1976. From 1982 to 1984, he was president of the Polish rowing associations. He died in Warsaw in 1992.
