= Saints Peter and Paul Garrison Church, Lviv =

Greek Catholic church in Lviv, Ukraine

Saints Peter and Paul Garrison Church
- Гарнізонна церква святих апостолів Петра і Павла
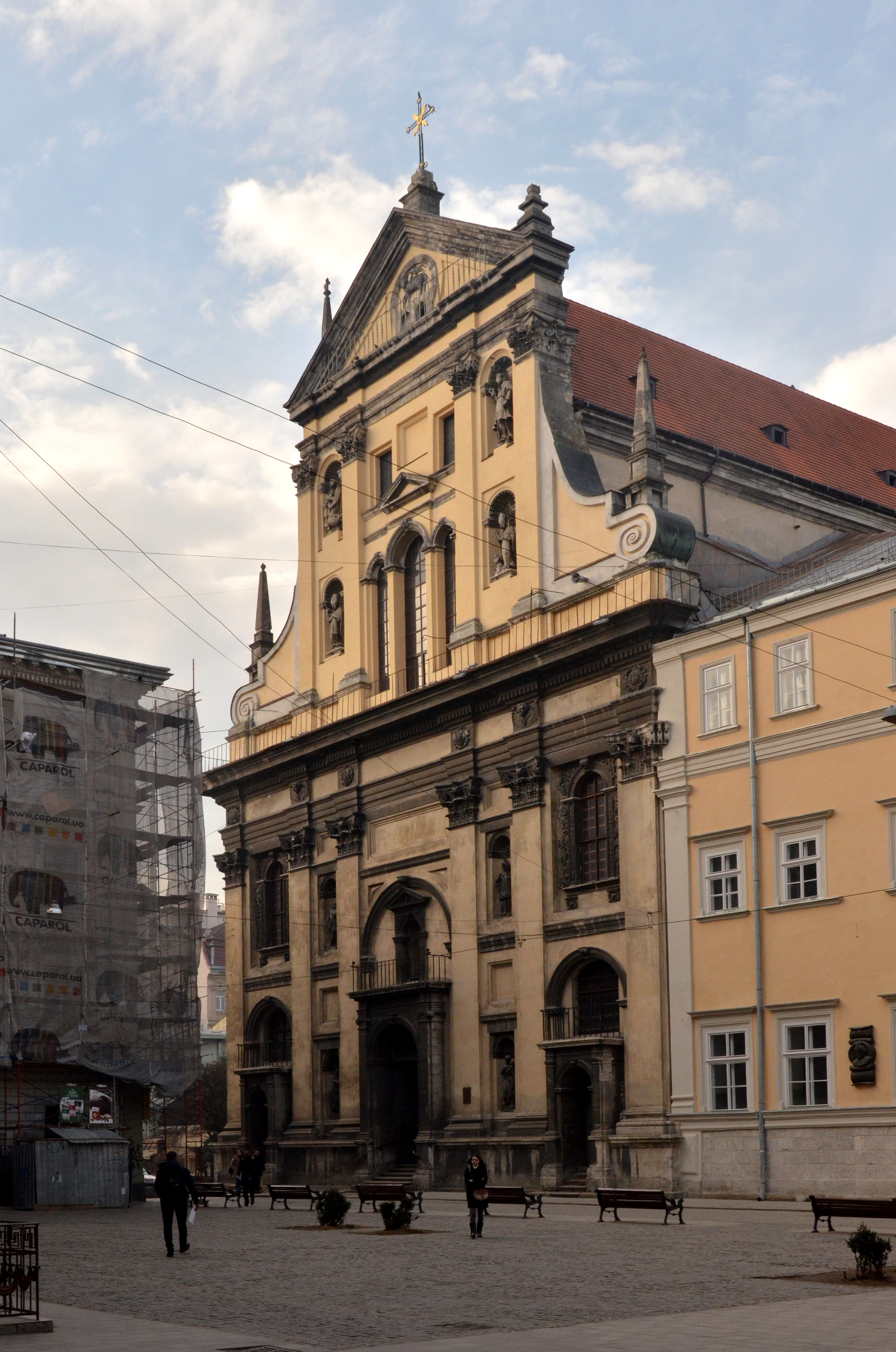
- Saints Peter and Paul Garrison Church
- 49.8415°N 24.0291°E
- Location: 79000, Ukraine, Lviv, Teatralna St. 11
- Country: Ukraine
- Denomination: Catholic Church
- Churchmanship: Ukrainian Greek-Catholic Church
- Website: petrapavla.org.ua

History
- Founded: 1610-1630
- Founder: Society of Jesus
- Dedication: Saint Apostles Peter and Paul

Architecture
- Architect: Giacomo Briano
- Style: Baroque

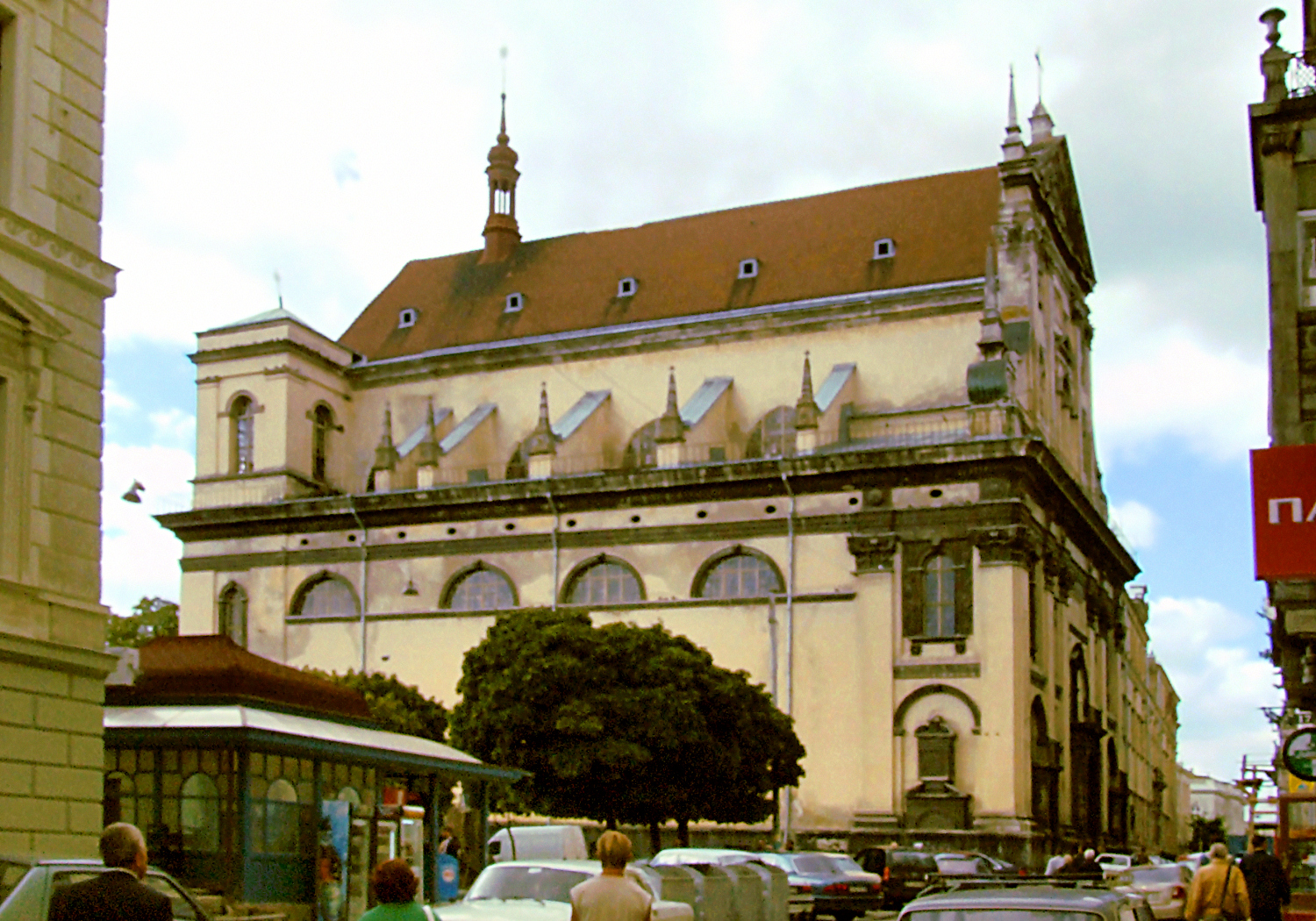
Jesuit Church in Lviv

Saints Peter and Paul Garrison Church (Ukrainian: Гарнізонна церква святих апостолів Петра і Павла, romanized: Harnizonna tserkva svyatykh apostoliv Petra i Pavla), known as the Jesuit Church, is an historic church in Lviv, Ukraine, built in years 1610-1630.

The church was built by the Society of Jesus in the baroque style at the beginning of the 17th century. It was closed by the Soviet Government in 1946 and used as a warehouse and book depository for several decades.

In 2010, the church was turned over to the Ukrainian Greek-Catholic Church, which restored the church and re-consecrated it in 2011. Today, it is a garrison church for the Ukrainian military.

== History ==
=== Church construction ===
In 1584, Jesuit missionaries arrived in Lviv and by 1590 had erected their first church. It was a wooden structure near the western part of the city's defensive walls where the Jesuit gate was located.

The construction on a more permanent church began in 1610. Sebastian Lachmius, a monk, based his design for the church on that of the Church of the Gesù. Ivan Molenda, the carver, painter Matviy Klymkovych and organ master Matviy Kraychynskyi already worked on the church interior between 1612 and 1613. Between 1618 and 1621 the architect of the Jesuit Order, Giacomo Briano, modified the building design and supervised the construction works. In 1624 the first lateral St. Benedict chapel was consecrated. In 1630 the church was completed and consecrated by the Archbishop of Lviv Jan Andrzej Próchnicki. When completed, it was one of the largest churches in the Polish–Lithuanian Commonwealth.

Having completed the building, in 1638 the vault of the church was decorated with stucco carving and covered with Matviy Klymkovych's paintings. In 1644 the organs made at Grohovsky's cost were consecrated.

In 1702 according to Martyn Hodny's project the bell tower was erected; it became the tallest Lviv tower (about 100 metres). In the 1720 – 1730s the tombstones of Elżbieta Sieniawska (Gostomska by birth), Jan Jabłonowski, Jan Stanisław Jabłonowski and Jan Wincenty Jabłonowski were erected in the church as they had financed the Jesuit College construction.

In 1734, the church suffered extensive fire damage. In 1754, a clock was mounted on the tower. In 1740 Franz Gregor Ignaz Eckstein (1689 – 1741) painted the principal nave. After his death Sebastian Eckstein painted the lateral naves and chapels. The sculptural crucifix by Jan Pfister embedded in one of the lateral altars is considered to be a precious artistic work. The grand central altar by Sebastian Fesinger was built in 1744 – 1747; two lateral altars were created in 1754 and 1759.

=== Later years ===
With the Suppression of the Society of Jesus by Pope Clement XIV in 1773, the Jesuits were expelled from Ukraine and the church was transformed military garrison church. In 1820, six years After Pope Pius VII renewed the Jesuit Order, they returned to Lviv and resumed control of the church.

In 1830 the church tower was pulled down after the Town Hall tower fell in 1828. Between 1836 and 1848 the Jesuits led active pastoral work. They performed the duties of prison chaplains, organised prayer brotherhoods and provided monastic communities with spiritual care.

To commemorate the church renovation the plate with the inscription ‘D.O.M. Haec aedes sacra inchoata 1610 dedicata 1630 restaurata 1842’ was mounted on the southern wall next to the façade. In 1843 painter Alojzy Reichan created the icons of Ignatius of Loyola and Francis Xavier for two lateral altars.

During the Revolutions of 1848, Austrian forces bombarded Lviv in response to a mutiny by local troops. Two cannonballs damaged the church roof. That same year, the Jesuits were again expelled from Lviv. In 1852, they returned again and took control of the church. In 1905 the icon of Our Lady of Admiration was crowned at the church. During World War I and World War II, the church suffered considerable damage.

During the church façade renovation in 1894 four statues of sainted Jesuits by Felix Pavlinski were placed in the lower tier bays: Ignatius of Loyola, Francis Xavier, Stanislaw Kostka and Andrzej Bobola.

=== Soviet period ===
At the end of World War II, Lviv was transferred from Poland to the Ukrainian Soviet Socialist Republic of the Soviet Union. On 4 June 1946 the Soviet government expelled the Jesuits from Ukraine. The Lviv Jesuits left also, taking with them the crowned icon of Holy Mother.

The church next saw use as a warehouse. The church roof, destroyed in the war, was temporarily fixed. In 1959, the roof was renovated under the supervision of architect Ihor Starosolskyi.

In the 1970s, the Lviv Vasyl Stefanyk Scientific Library of the National Academy of Sciences of Ukraine used the church as a book depository accommodating over 2.3 million books. The use of the church's building as a book depository protected the interior from considerable destruction, however the inner embellishment was not preserved. Frescoes of the central vault and lateral naves were lost because of the bad condition of the church's roof and dampness.

At the end of the 1990s archaeological excavations were carried out in the crypt beneath the central nave and the basement under the southern nave was renovated. The church became the first monument of baroque architecture in Lviv.

=== Church restoration ===
On October 1, 2008, bishop Ihor Voznyak ordered the chaplains of the Center of Military Chaplaincy to start working on transferring the church to the Ukrainian Greek-Catholic Church (UGCC). The process of collecting all necessary paperwork lasted for two years.

On May 14, 2010, the Society of Jesus in Ukraine agreed to the reopening of Saint Apostles Peter and Paul Garrison Church under the UGCC. On July 8, 2010, the City of Lviv transferred the building to the UGCC. The UGCC placed it under the care of the Center of Military Chaplaincy.

This church has its own history and it is a well-known fact that from 1848 to 1939 it was used as a garrison church and our renowned hetman Bohdan Khmelnytsky studied at the former Jesuit College, which adjoins the church. I believe it would be appropriate to renew this church and taking into consideration its historic past to allow to resume pastoral care to meet the spiritual needs of the military of the city and their families. Every country where military pastoral care or chaplaincy is officially recognized by the government has garrison churches where the military gather for the prayer on various occasions and for state and military commemorative dates and celebrations. Patriarch Lubomyr Husar, Kyiv, 25 May 2009

The first liturgical services started in the church basements in February 2011. On 12 July 2011 the Holy Liturgy dedicated to the feast of the patrons took place in the narthex . It was celebrated by the main military chaplain of the Lviv Archeparchy, the dean of the church priest Stepan Sus in concelebration with father doctor Borys Gudziak and fathers chaplains. The youth choir from the church of All Saints of the Ukrainian People (Lviv) led the singing. This was the first Divine Liturgy celebrated in the church since 1946.

During October and November 2011, over 144 trucks of books and 30 trucks of shelves were removed from the church.

== Church reopening ==
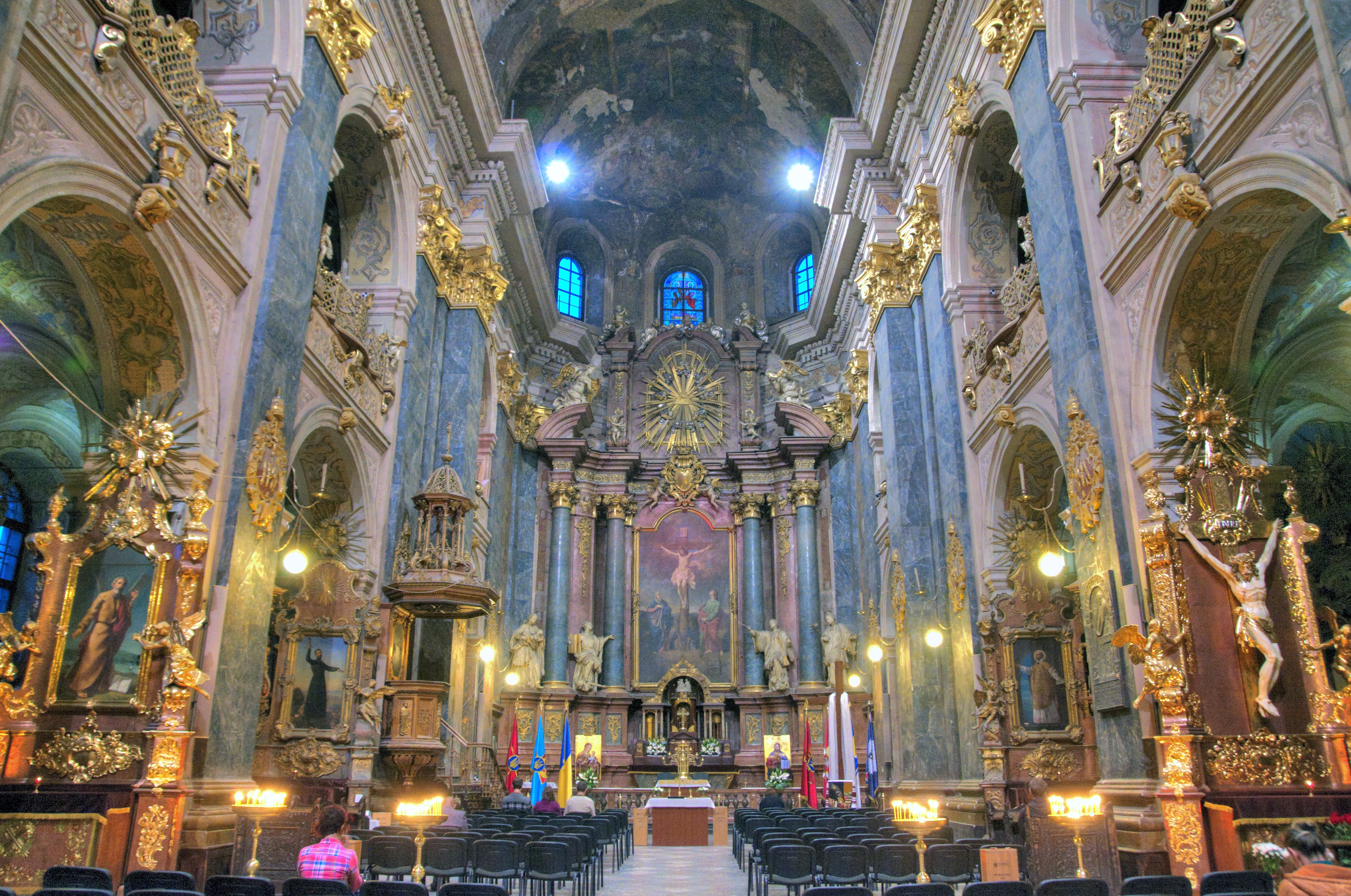
Interior, pictured 2015

The 20th anniversary of the Armed Forces of Ukraine in Lviv was marked by the re-consecration of Saints Peter and Paul Garrison Church. The ceremony was attended by the Head of Lviv Regional State Administration Mykhaylo Kostiuk, the Mayor of Lviv Andriy Sadovyi, the commander of Western Operation Headquarters lieutenant-general Yuriy Dumanskyi, rector of the Hetman Petro Sahaydachnyi Army Academy lieutenant-general Pavlo Tkachuk, commanders of military units and bases, garrison military men and the public.

Over 5,000 people attended the ceremony. It was performed by Archbishop and Metropolitan Ihor with the Eparch of Sokal and Zhovkva districts, head of the Patriarchal Curia Department for Pastoral Care in the Armed Forces of Ukraine and military chaplains, the Archbishop Mykhayil (Koltun).

Reverend and Venerable Fathers, Highly Respected Military Men, Highly Esteemed Representatives of Authority, Dear Worshippers; we have been waiting for a long time for this day, to consecrate this church, which used to be a book depository. From now on, people will pray here to Almighty God, thank God, and reconcile with God through sincere repentance. It is so important to live in peace with God, acquire piety and eternal reward. Ihor (Voznyak) Lviv, 6 december 201

Garrison churches work in almost every country of the world, which fact demonstrates that army is based not only on power and virtues of valour, honour and glory that are valued among the military, but also spiritual, Christian values. The soldier brought up on these values has strong body and is strong in spirit, and ready to defend their Motherland.

== Recent history ==
Since the 2022 Russian invasion of Ukraine, the Garrison church has become a frequent site of military weddings and funerals. Ceremonies are held for fallen soldiers at the church before they are returned to their hometowns.

The church also hosts funerals individuals not attached to the military. In 2024 it hosted the funeral of former MP Iryna Farion who was shot by an unknown assailant.

== See also ==
- List of Jesuit sites
- Center of Military Chaplaincy

== Literature ==
- Kościoły i klasztory rzymskokatolickie dawnego województwa ruskiego. Red. Jan K. Ostrowski. Część I, tom 20. Kraków: Antykwa, 2012. pp. 71–132.
- Вуйцик В. С., Липка Р. М. Зустріч зі Львовом. Львів: Каменяр, 1987. pp. 77–80.
- Крип'якевич І. П. Історичні проходи по Львові. Львів: Каменяр, 1991. p. 94.
- Островский Г. С. Львов. Издание второе, переработанное и дополненное. Ленинград: Искусство, 1975. С.107-108.
- Памятники градостроительства и архитектуры Украинской ССР. Киев: Будивельник, 1983–1986. Том 3, с. 76.
- Трегубова Т. О., Мих Р. М. Львів: Архітектурно-історичний нарис. Київ: Будівельник. С. 93–95.
