= Vadai (surname) =

Vadai is a surname. Notable people with the surname include:

- Ágnes Vadai (born 1974), Hungarian politician
- Tibor Vadai (1913–?), Hungarian rower
