= Rudolf Höpfler =

Austrian rower

Personal information
- Born: 22 January 1912
- Died: unknown

Sport
- Sport: Rowing
Medal record
Men's rowing
Representing Austria
European Rowing Championships
Bronze medal – third place	1934 Lucerne	Coxless pair
Silver medal – second place	1935 Berlin	Coxless four

Rudolf Höpfler (22 January 1912 – ?) was an Austrian rower. He competed at the 1936 Summer Olympics in Berlin with the men's coxless four where they came fifth.
