= Aatto Nuora =

Finnish sports shooter

Personal information
- Born: 23 October 1895 Virolahti, Finland
- Died: 18 July 1990 (aged 94) Helsinki, Finland

Sport
- Sport: Sports shooting

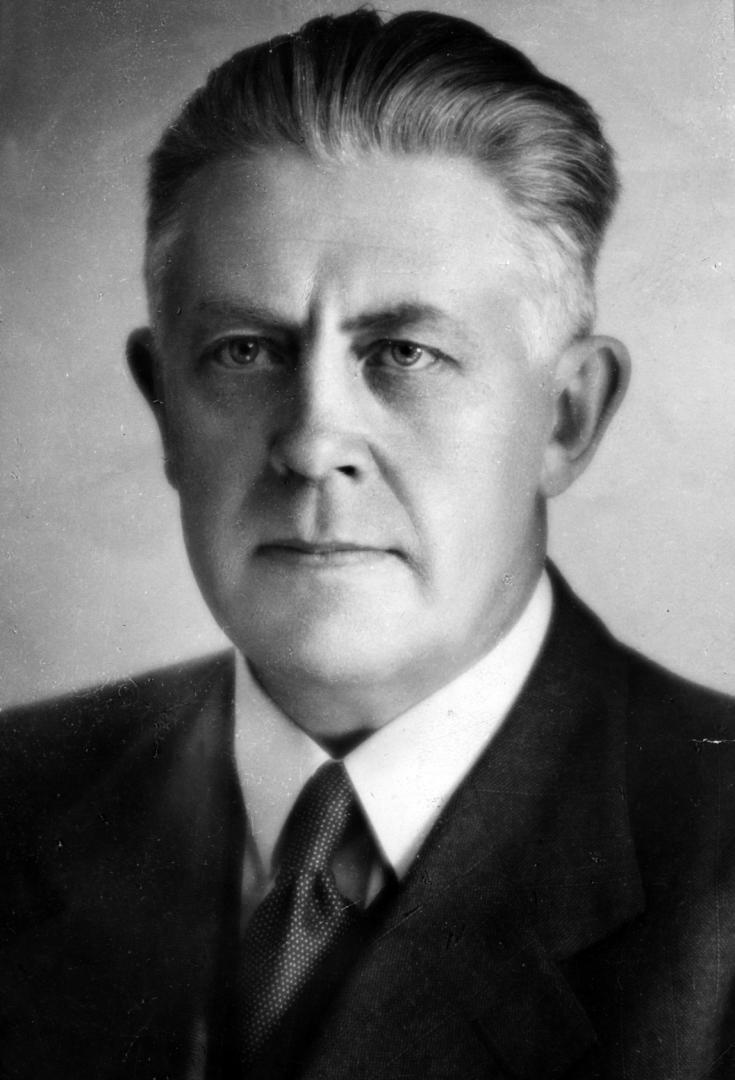
Aatto Nuora 1935

Aatto Nuora (23 October 1895 – 18 July 1990) was a Finnish sports shooter. He competed in the 50 m pistol event at the 1936 Summer Olympics.
