= Aldo Pellizzoni =

Italian rower

Personal information
- Nationality: Italian
- Born: 9 May 1914; Monfalcone, Italy
- Died: 2 May 1977 (aged 62); Monfalcone, Italy

Sport
- Sport: Rowing

Aldo Pellizzoni (9 May 1914 – 2 May 1977) was an Italian rower. He competed in the men's coxless four at the 1936 Summer Olympics.
