= Hans Binder (rower) =

Austrian rower (1909–1980)

Personal information
- Born: Johann Binder; 22 August 1909
- Died: 14 July 1980 (aged 70)

Sport
- Sport: Rowing
- Club: RV Wiking Linz
Medal record
Men's rowing
Representing Austria
European Rowing Championships
| Silver medal – second place | 1935 Berlin | Coxless four |

Hans Binder (22 August 1909 – 14 July 1980) was an Austrian rower. He finished fifth in men's coxless four at the 1936 Summer Olympics in Berlin.
