= Wilhelm Klopfer =

Swiss rower

Personal information
- Full name: Wilhelm Hermann Klopfer
- Born: 1 June 1901
- Died: unknown

Sport
- Sport: Rowing
Medal record
Men's rowing
Representing Switzerland
European Rowing Championships
Bronze medal – third place	1937 Amsterdam	Coxless pair

Wilhelm Hermann Klopfer (1 June 1901 – ?) was a Swiss rower. He competed at the 1936 Summer Olympics in Berlin with the men's coxless pair where they came fifth.
