= Edmond Van Herck =

Belgian rower (1913–2007)

Personal information
- Nationality: Belgian
- Born: 10 July 1913; Antwerp, Belgium
- Died: 3 July 2007 (aged 93); Antwerp, Belgium

Sport
- Sport: Rowing

Edmond Van Herck (10 July 1913 – 3 July 2007) was a Belgian rower. He competed in the men's coxless pair event at the 1936 Summer Olympics.
