= Bertalan Zsótér =

Hungarian sports shooter

Personal information
- Born: 6 July 1906 Bečej, Austria-Hungary
- Died: 20 December 1980 (aged 74)

Sport
- Sport: Sports shooting

Bertalan Zsótér (6 July 1906 – 20 December 1980) was a Hungarian sports shooter. He competed in the 50 m pistol event at the 1936 Summer Olympics.
