= Georgios Kontogiannis =

Greek sports shooter

Personal information
- Born: 1899

Sport
- Sport: Sports shooting

Georgios Kontogiannis (born 1899, date of death unknown) was a Greek sports shooter. He competed in the 50 m pistol event at the 1936 Summer Olympics.
