= Ferenc Dobos =

Hungarian rower

Personal information
- Nationality: Hungarian
- Born: 25 April 1912; Odorheiu Secuiesc, Austria-Hungary
- Died: May 1992 (aged 79–80); Harghita, Romania

Sport
- Sport: Rowing

Ferenc Dobos (25 April 1912 – May 1992) was a Hungarian rower. He competed in the men's coxless four at the 1936 Summer Olympics.
