= Keld Karise =

Danish rower (1917–2002)

Personal information
- Full name: Keld Henrik Vestergaard Karise
- Nationality: Danish
- Born: 20 March 1917; Copenhagen, Denmark
- Died: 6 December 2002 (aged 85)

Sport
- Sport: Rowing

Keld Henrik Vestergaard Karise (20 March 1917 – 6 December 2002) was a Danish rower. He competed in two events at the 1936 Summer Olympics. Karise died on 6 December 2002, at the age of 85.
