= Tibor Mamusich =

Hungarian rower

Personal information
- Born: 19 November 1911 Baja, Hungary
- Died: 22 October 1999 (aged 87)

Sport
- Sport: Rowing
Medal record
Men's rowing
Representing Hungary
European Rowing Championships
Gold medal – first place	1933 Budapest	Coxed pair
Gold medal – first place	1934 Lucerne	Coxed pair
Gold medal – first place	1934 Lucerne	Eight
Gold medal – first place	1935 Berlin	Coxless pair

Tibor Mamusich (19 November 1911 – 22 October 1999) was a Hungarian rower.

Mamusich competed at the 1936 Summer Olympics in Berlin with the coxless pair alongside Károly Győry where they came fourth. They also competed in the coxed pair, with László Molnár as coxswain, but they did not start in their semi-final race.
