= Piccaluga =

Piccaluga is an Italian surname, a variation of Pittaluga. Notable people with the surname include:

- Angelo Piccaluga (1906–1993), Italian footballer
- Fabio Piccaluga (born 1953), known as Fabio Concato, Italian singer-songwriter

== See also ==
- Pitaluga
