= Gabriel Benquet =

Uruguayan rower

Personal information
- Full name: Gabriel Benquet Lucu
- Nationality: Uruguayan
- Born: 20 May 1905; France

Sport
- Sport: Rowing

Gabriel Benquet (born 20 May 1905, date of death unknown) was a Uruguayan rower. He competed in the men's coxless pair event at the 1936 Summer Olympics.
