= Willem Jens =

Dutch rower

Personal information
- Nationality: Dutch
- Born: 22 October 1908; Schoonrewoerd, Netherlands
- Died: 4 August 1999 (aged 90); Achel, Belgium

Sport
- Sport: Rowing

Willem Jens (22 October 1908 – 4 August 1999) was a Dutch rower. He competed in the men's coxless pair event at the 1936 Summer Olympics.
