= Saint Peter and Paul Cathedral, Lutsk =

Saint Peter and Paul Cathedral
- Cathedral Church of Paul and Peter the Apostles
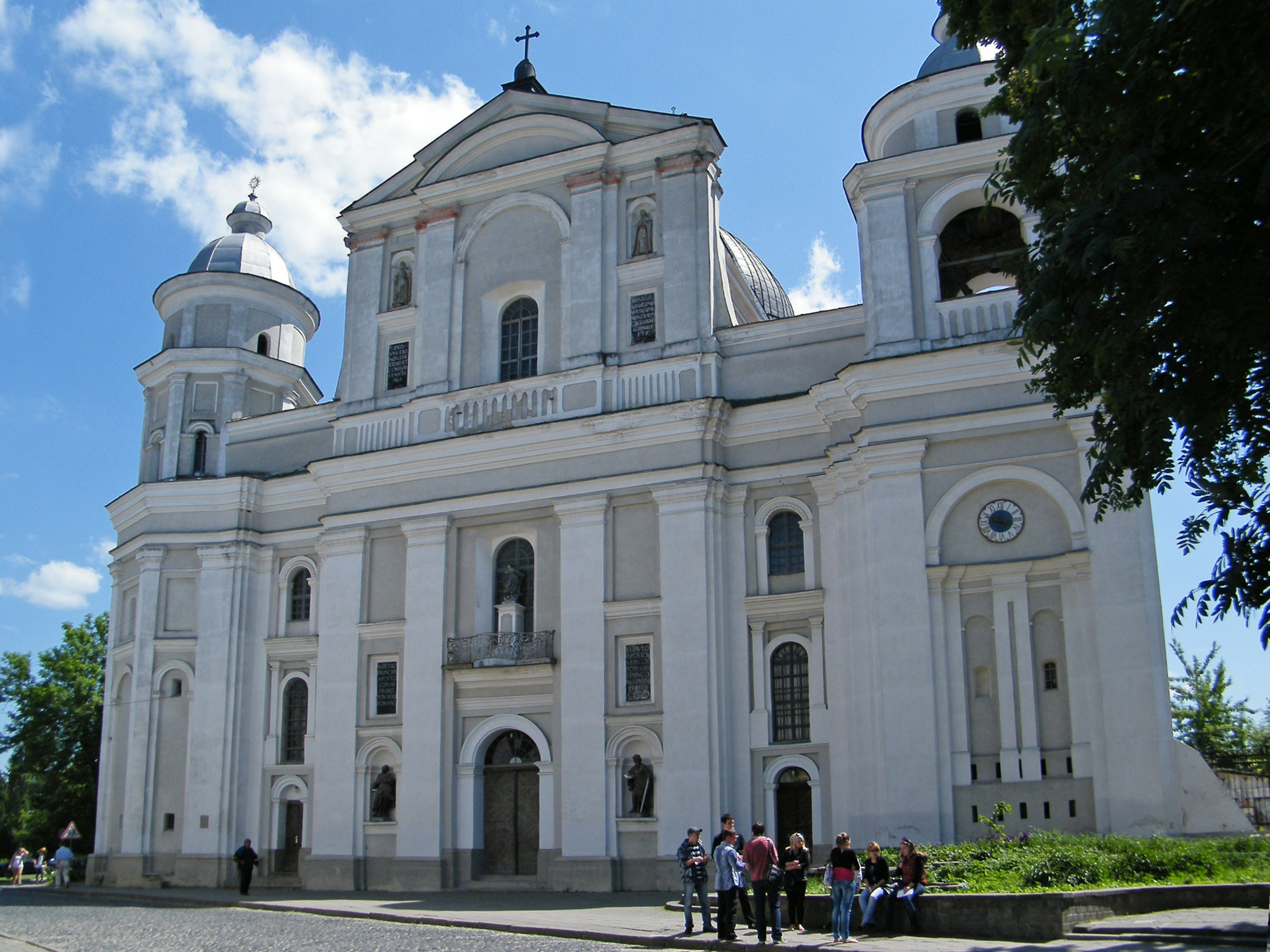
- Saint Peter and Paul Cathedral
- 50°44′18″N 25°19′12″E
- Location: Lutsk
- Country: Ukraine
- Denomination: Latin Catholic

History
- Consecrated: 1639 (1640)

Architecture
- Architect(s): Giacomo Briano, Pawel Gizycki etc.
- Style: Renaissance (primary), Classicism (secondary)
- Years built: 1616–1640

Specifications
- Height: 138f (42m)

Administration
- Diocese: Lutsk

Clergy
- Bishop: Marcjan Trofimiak

Immovable Monument of National Significance of Ukraine
- Official name: Костьол (Church)
- Type: Architecture
- Reference no.: 030108/1

The Saint Peter and Paul Cathedral (Ukrainian: Кафедральний костел Святих Апостолів Петра і Павла; Polish: Katedra Świętych Apostołów Piotra i Pawła), and its Jesuit college are national landmarks in Lutsk. The church and college were built for the Society of Jesus of Lutsk in the 17th century. The cathedral is the main church in the Diocese of Lutsk, the college part of the National university of Food Technologies.

== History ==
The Society of Jesus mission in Lutsk was established in the first decade of the 17th century. King Sigismund III Vasa, bishops Marcin Szyszkowski and Paweł Wołucki founded the church which was designed by architects M. Gintz and Giacomo Briano. In 1616 the construction of church was started. There has been a segment of a castle on the site since the 15th century. In late 1630 the Renaissance church was completed. The plan was in the form of a Greek Cross. The construction of the college was completed in the middle of the 17th century. The architect was Benedetto Molli.

Initially 150 students studied at the college. Later there were probably more than 300. Education was free and conducted at a high level. For this reason, there were large numbers of students from Lviv, Ostroh and Kyiv. The curriculum covered moral theology, philosophy, mathematics, physics, ethics, fencing, languages, dance and theatre.

In the 1620s and 1630s, there were conflicts between Jesuits and members of the Lutsk Eastern Orthodox church. Some clashes and court cases are known. In 1627–1628 and 1639, Jesuit students attacked orthodox monks. Wojteh Helpovski tried to drown Serapion, a member of the orthodox fellowship. College students killed the monk Serapion.

The Jesuit church was damaged in a fire on 14 June 1724. Architect Paweł Giżycki radically reconstructed the building over a six-year period, giving the building a new appearance. New walls were built around the old church and two towers were added near the corners of new walls. The west tower was square in plan, the east tower octagonal. In general, the new Jesuit church was in the Classicist style. A decree signed by Pope Clement XIV in July 1773 suppressed the Order leading to the closure of the college too. The Commission of National Education became the new owner of former Jesuit church which was soon elevated to a cathedral after the Holy Trinity cathedral on the same street was destroyed by fire and dismantled. The former Jesuit church then became Saint Peter and Paul Cathedral.

The third partition of Poland took place in 1795. Volyn was annexed by the Russian Empire. The Russian government oppressed Catholics for various reasons. Thus many Catholic orders were turned back from empire territory. Many Catholic monasteries and churches were appealed during the 19th century. Saint Peter and Paul Cathedral was the only active Catholic church in Lutsk.

In 1946, the Soviet government close the cathedral. Church was robbed, many icons, furniture and other church valuables were lost. The large organ was destroyed. The church used to be The Museum of Atheism in the 1980s.

The cathedral was restored after the dissolution of the USSR. A new German organ was installed in 1999. Marcjan Trofimiak became a bishop the following year.

== Architecture ==
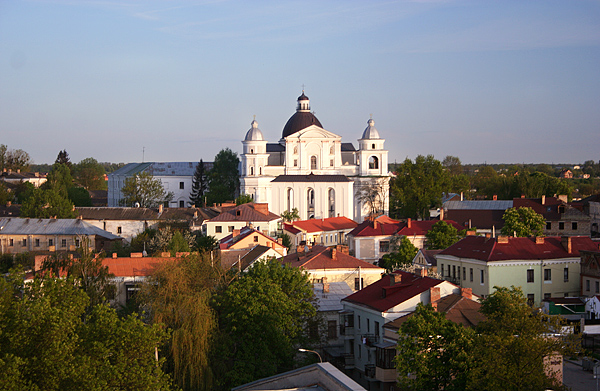
Cathedral

The basilica consists of three naves, a bypass gallery and two corner towers. The main facade is decorated with five sculptures and Latin inscription boards. The three-storey college is situated behind the church. The most prominent is south-west facade. It is adorned by five massive avant-corps with triangular pediments and tiled roofs. The ruins of the old castle remain close to the south corner of the college. They consist of part of the wall and the 15th-century Czartoryski.

The interior of church is decorated with paintings, epitaphs, commemorative plaques, old furniture, sculptures, reliefs, monograms, and etchings. There are very few paintings in the sacristy and chapel. Some paintings were restored and fitted to a niche in the wall. The oldest were completed in the 18th century. Some of them were moved from other churches. A few of the paintings were specifically prepared for the church. The oldest is by K. Willani, painted in 1801. The few paintings in sacristy show the Catholic churches of Lutsk: Dominican, Trinitarian, Bernardine and Carmelitan.

The former Jesuit church is the main church in the diocese of Lutsk maintaining Volyn and Rivne oblasts. Marcjan Trofimiak is the bishop. The college building is used for the Volyn technikum which is part of the National University of food technologies. The three-level dungeon is open for tourists and can be accessed from behind the square tower.

== Gallery ==
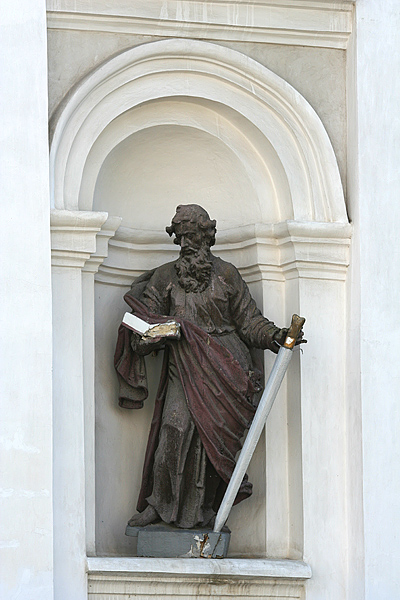
Saint Paul

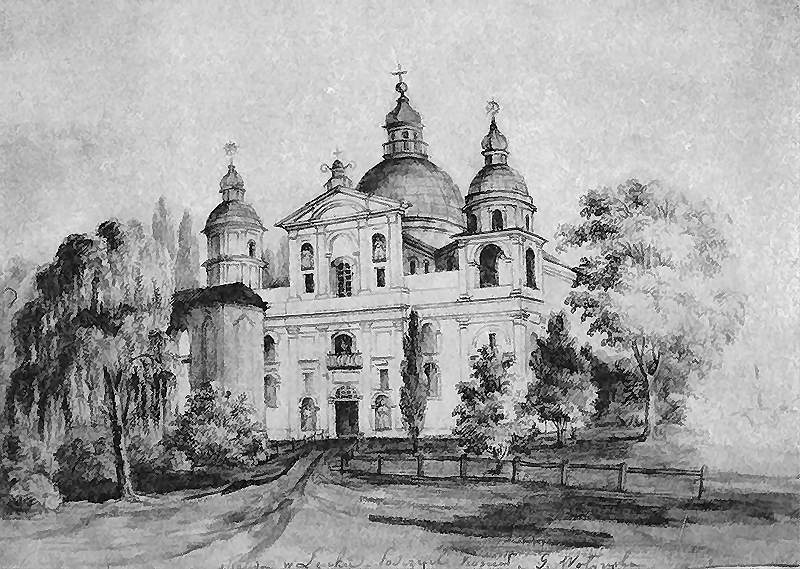
Napoleon Orda

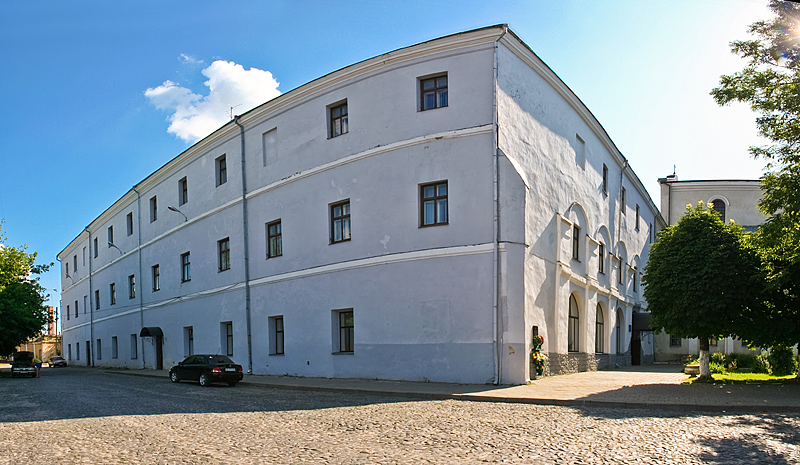
Collegium

== See also ==
- List of Jesuit sites

== Sources ==
- Mieczysław Orłowicz, Ilustrowany przewodnik po Wołyniu. Łuck 1929
- Grzegorz Rąkowski, Przewodnik po Zachodniej Ukrainie, część I, Wołyń
- Adam Wojnicz. Łuck na Wołyniu. Łuck, 1922, s. 52-53
- Łuck w Słowniku geograficznym Królestwa Polskiego i innych krajów słowiańskich, t. 1, pod red. F. Sulimirskiego, B. Chlebowskiego, W. Walewskiego, t. 5, 1884, s. 778—792
- Stecki. Łuck starożytny i dzisiejszy, Kraków, 1876.
- Луцьк. Історико-архітектурний нарис. Б.Колосок, Р.Метельницький — Київ, 1990. — с.95-100
