= Ugo Pistolesi =

Italian sports shooter

Personal information
- Born: 25 December 1905 Pisa, Italy
- Died: 17 January 1974 (aged 68)

Sport
- Sport: Sports shooting

Ugo Pistolesi (29 December 1883 – 17 January 1974) was an Italian sports shooter. He competed in the 50 m pistol event at the 1936 Summer Olympics.
