= László Molnár =

Hungarian rower

Personal information
- Born: 29 June 1902 Kiskunfélegyháza, Hungary
- Died: 28 July 1981 (aged 79) Budapest, Hungary

Sport
- Sport: Rowing
- Club: Hungária Evezős Egylet, Budapest
Medal record
Men's rowing
Representing Hungary
European Rowing Championships
Silver medal – second place	1932 Belgrade	Eight
Gold medal – first place	1933 Budapest	Eight
Gold medal – first place	1934 Lucerne	Eight
Gold medal – first place	1934 Lucerne	Coxed pair

László Molnár (29 June 1902 – 28 July 1981) was a Hungarian coxswain.

Molnár competed at the 1936 Summer Olympics in Berlin with the men's coxed four where they came fifth. He also competed in the coxed pair, with Károly Győry and Tibor Mamusich as team members, but they did not start in their semi-final race.
