= Rowing at the 1936 Summer Olympics – Men's coxless pair =

Men's coxless pair at the Games of the XI Olympiad
- Date: 11–13 August 1936
- Competitors: 26 from 13 nations

Medalists
1st place, gold medalist(s)		Willi Eichhorn; Hugo Strauß	Germany
2nd place, silver medalist(s)		Harry Larsen; Richard Olsen	Denmark
3rd place, bronze medalist(s)		Horacio Podestá; Julio Curatella	Argentina

The men's coxless pair competition at the 1936 Summer Olympics in Berlin took place are at Grünau on the Langer See.

== Schedule ==
Date	Round
11 August 1936	Heats
12 August 1936	Semifinal
13 August 1936	Final

== Results ==
=== Heats ===
First boat of each heat qualified to the final, remainder goes to the semifinal.

==== Heat 1 ====
Rank	Rowers	Country	Time	Notes
1	Ryszard Borzuchowski; Edward Kobyliński	Poland	7:29.9	Q
2	Wilhelm Klopfer; Karl Müller	Switzerland	7:33.7	
3	Frans Thissen; Edmond Van Herck	Belgium	7:38.1	
4	Afonso de Castro; Eduardo Lehman	Brazil	7:40.2	
5	Jan Kramer; Willem Jens	Netherlands	7:48.0	

==== Heat 2 ====
Rank	Rowers	Country	Time	Notes
1	Károly Győry; Tibor Mamusich	Hungary	7:19.0	Q
2	Harry Larsen; Richard Olsen	Denmark	7:19.1	
3	Baldomiro Benquet; Gabriel Benquet	Uruguay	7:42.1	
4	Harry Sharkey; George Dahm	United States	7:50.0	

==== Heat 3 ====
Rank	Rowers	Country	Time	Notes
1	Willi Eichhorn; Hugo Strauß	Germany	7:12.6	Q
2	Horacio Podestá; Julio Curatella	Argentina	7:20.0	
3	Thomas Cree; David Burnford	Great Britain	7:32.5	
4	Heinz Gattringer; Max Colli	Austria	7:38.7	

=== Semifinal ===
First boat of each heat qualified to the final.

==== Heat 1 ====
Rank	Rowers	Country	Time	Notes
1	Horacio Podestá; Julio Curatella	Argentina	9:11.4	Q
2	Thomas Cree; David Burnford	Great Britain	9:14.4	
3	Harry Sharkey; George Dahm	United States	DNF	
4	Afonso de Castro; Eduardo Lehman	Brazil	DNF	

==== Heat 2 ====
Rank	Rowers	Country	Time	Notes
1	Wilhelm Klopfer; Karl Müller	Switzerland	8:57.4	Q
2	Baldomiro Benquet; Gabriel Benquet	Uruguay	9:00.8	
3	Heinz Gattringer; Max Colli	Austria	9:42.8	

==== Heat 3 ====
Rank	Rowers	Country	Time	Notes
1	Harry Larsen; Richard Olsen	Denmark	8:53.4	Q
2	Jan Kramer; Willem Jens	Netherlands	9:25.4	
3	Frans Thissen; Edmond Van Herck	Belgium	9:33.1	

=== Final ===
Rank	Rowers	Country	Time	Notes
1st place, gold medalist(s)	Willi Eichhorn; Hugo Strauß	Germany	8:16.1	
2nd place, silver medalist(s)	Harry Larsen; Richard Olsen	Denmark	8:19.2	
3rd place, bronze medalist(s)	Horacio Podestá; Julio Curatella	Argentina	8:23.0	
4	Károly Győry; Tibor Mamusich	Hungary	8:25.7	
5	Wilhelm Klopfer; Karl Müller	Switzerland	8:33.0	
6	Ryszard Borzuchowski; Edward Kobyliński	Poland	8:41.9	
