= Erich Krempel =

German sport shooter (1913–1992)

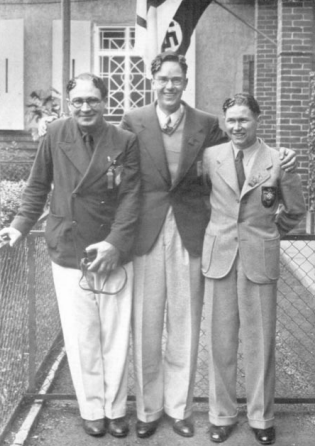

Personal information
- Born: 18 August 1913 Suhl, Germany
- Died: 26 September 1992 (aged 79)

Sport
- Sport: Sports shooting
Medal record
Men's shooting
Representing Germany
Olympic Games
| Silver medal – second place | 1936 Berlin | 50 metre pistol |

Erich Krempel (18 August 1913 – 26 September 1992) was a German sport shooter who competed in the 1936 Summer Olympics. In 1936 he won the silver medal in the 50 metre pistol event.
