= Tapio Wartiovaara =

Finnish sports shooter (1909–1940)

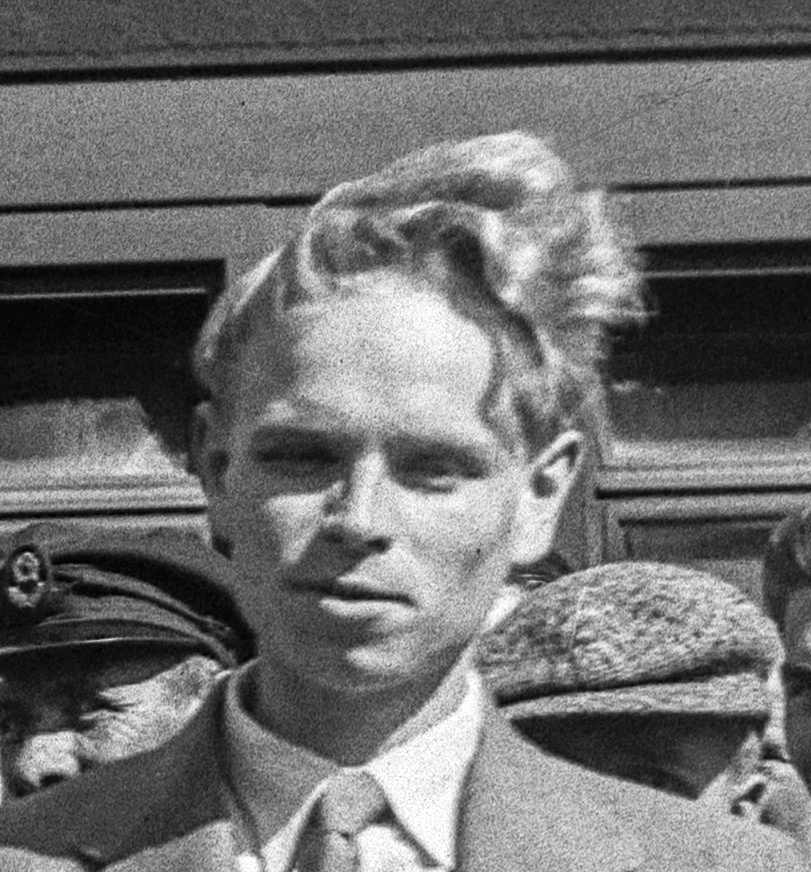

Personal information
- Born: 18 May 1909 Helsinki, Finland
- Died: 20 February 1940 (aged 30)

Sport
- Sport: Sports shooting

Tapio Wartiovaara (18 May 1909 – 20 February 1940) was a Finnish sports shooter. He competed in the 50 m pistol event at the 1936 Summer Olympics. He died from his wounds after fighting in the Battle of Taipale.
