= Gyula Halmay =

Hungarian rower

Personal information
- Nationality: Hungarian
- Born: 18 August 1910

Sport
- Sport: Rowing

Gyula Halmay (born 18 August 1910, date of death unknown) was a Hungarian rower. He competed in the men's coxless four at the 1936 Summer Olympics.
