= Karl Müller (rower) =

Swiss rower

Personal information
- Born: 10 December 1912
- Died: unknown

Sport
- Sport: Rowing
Medal record
Men's rowing
Representing Switzerland
European Rowing Championships
Bronze medal – third place	1937 Amsterdam	Coxless pair

Karl Müller (born 10 December 1912) was a Swiss rower. He competed at the 1936 Summer Olympics in Berlin with the men's coxless pair where they came fifth.
