= Frans Thissen =

Belgian rower

Personal information
- Born: 9 November 1909
- Died: 5 May 1977 (aged 67)

Sport
- Sport: Rowing
- Club: Royal Sport Nautique Antwerp
Medal record
Men's rowing
Representing Belgium
European Rowing Championships
| Bronze medal – third place | 1932 Belgrade | Coxless pair |

Frans Thissen (9 November 1909 – 5 May 1977) was a Belgian rower. He competed at the 1936 Summer Olympics in Berlin with the men's coxless pair where they were eliminated in the semi-final.
