= Jan Koller (sport shooter) =

Czech sport shooter

Personal information
- Born: 11 August 1901

Sport
- Sport: Sport shooting

Jan Koller (11 August 1901 – ?) was a Czech sport shooter. He competed for Czechoslovakia in the 50 m pistol event at the 1936 Summer Olympics.
