= Gustaf Bergström (sport shooter) =

Swedish sports shooter

Personal information
- Born: 8 March 1889 Stockholm, Sweden
- Died: 12 October 1954 (aged 65) Stockholm, Sweden

Sport
- Sport: Sports shooting

Gustaf Bergström (8 March 1889 – 12 October 1954) was a Swedish sports shooter. He competed in the 50 m pistol event at the 1936 Summer Olympics.
