= Max Colli =

Austrian rower

Personal information
- Nationality: Austrian
- Born: 5 December 1915

Sport
- Sport: Rowing

Max Colli (born 5 December 1915, date of death unknown) was an Austrian rower. He competed in the men's coxless pair event at the 1936 Summer Olympics.
