= Jan Kramer =

Dutch rower

Personal information
- Nationality: Dutch
- Born: 16 February 1913; Utrecht, Netherlands
- Died: 10 February 1997 (aged 83); The Hague, Netherlands

Sport
- Sport: Rowing

Jan Kramer (16 February 1913 – 10 February 1997) was a Dutch rower. He competed in the men's coxless pair event at the 1936 Summer Olympics.
