= Carlos Lalanne =

Chilean sports shooter

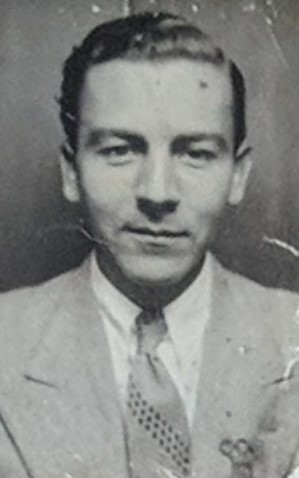

Personal information
- Born: 14 December 1908
- Died: 4 October 1989 (aged 80)

Sport
- Sport: Sports shooting

Carlos Lalanne (14 December 1908 – 4 October 1989) was a Chilean sports shooter. He competed in the 50 m pistol event at the 1936 Summer Olympics.
