= Center of Military Chaplaincy =

Ukrainian religious organization

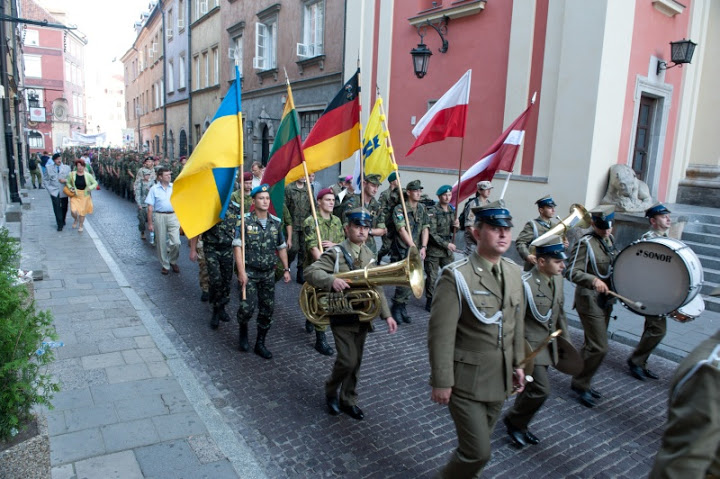
Ukrainian Soldiers take part in a pilgrimage to Częstochowa

Center of Military Chaplaincy (Ukrainian: Центр Військового Капеланства) is a Ukrainian religious organization within the Curia of Lviv Archeparchy of the Ukrainian Greek-Catholic Church that works directly with Armed Forces of Ukraine. The Center of Military Chaplaincy provides counseling and pastoral care to officers, soldiers and their families.

== Organization ==
The headquarters of the Center of Military Chaplaincy of the Curia of Lviv Archeparchy of the Ukrainian Greek-Catholic Church are located in Lviv, Ukraine. This organization is directly associated with the Saints Peter and Paul Garrison Church (Lviv). The center of Military Chaplaincy was created as an outcome of free will of faithful citizens, who share Christian values of the Catholic Church and want to fulfill the spiritual needs of military personnel and their family members. The goals of the chaplains of the Center of Military Chaplaincy are to provide pastoral care to Ukrainian officers, soldiers and their families as well as to peacekeepers stationed abroad in foreign countries. The founder of Center of Military Chaplaincy is the Curia of Lviv Archeparchy of the Ukrainian Greek-Catholic Church. The Center of Military Chaplaincy actively cooperates with foreign catholic organizations and takes part in international pilgrimages.

== History ==
The foundations for creating the Center of Military Chaplaincy were laid out from the cooperation of seminarians of the Holy Spirit Greek-Catholic Seminary, the Ukrainian Greek-Catholic Church and the Army Academy of Hetman Petro Sahajdachnyj.

In the fall of 2000, the chapel of the Army Academy opened its doors to prayer as part of the celebrations for the centennial anniversary of Galician Officers. On November 18, 2000 the chapel received its spiritual patron – Archangel Michael, and was blessed by bishops of five traditional churches of Ukraine (UGCC, UOC MP, UOC KP, UAOC, RCC) and transferred to the spiritual care of the Holy Spirit Greek-Catholic Seminary.

In August 2002 with the blessing of his beatitude Lubomyr Husar, the seminarians together with the military personnel started the renovation of the former military chapel, which lasted for 3 years. A two tier iconostasis and a presbytery were constructed, the choir was decorated by frescoes by artist Volodymyr Shynin. A seven meters tall stained glass artwork showing the patron of the chapel Archangel Michael was installed in the presbytery (author Olga Chorna). The icons above the altar and inside the iconostasis were painted by Volodymyr Sykuta.

On November 20, 2005, the renovated chapel, its altar and iconostasis were consecrated by Archbishop of Lviv Ihor Voznyak.

== Current activities ==
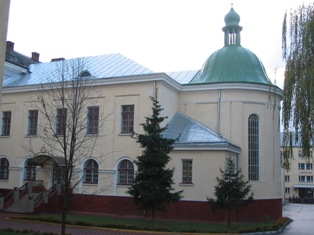
View of the Chapel of Archangel Michael

Beside the Sunday Divine services, there are lectures and classes on current moral and ethical issues – presented by seminarians, which are the representatives for the Center of Military Chaplaincy. Beside that the chaplains together with the commanding officers organize excursions and pilgrimages to the holy places of Galicia as well as to the numerous churches of Lviv. Starting from the spring of 2006 the Center of Military Chaplaincy is responsible for the moral upbringing of the cadets at the Liceum of the Heroes of Kruty. The main activities consist of lectures on the current moral issues, celebration of religious and military holidays, and participation in the Divine Services and prayers. One of the main achievements of the Center of Military Chaplaincy is the construction of a Liceum Chapel, where cadets can pray during the school year.

An important stepping stone in the development of the Center of Military Chaplaincy is the reopening and consecration of the Saints Peter and Paul Garrison Church on December 6, 2011 to celebrate the 20th anniversary of Armed Forces of Ukraine. This church is unique, since it is the only garrison church in all of Ukraine and serves as a place where military holidays such as graduation of new officers and other feasts are celebrated with a Divine Liturgy, blessing of military banners and prayer together with an active participation of officers, soldiers, cadets and their families. The Saints Peter and Paul Garrison Church also serves as an important center for developing of pastoral care for military personnel as well as being simply a place to meet God.
