= Heinz Gattringer =

Austrian rower

Personal information
- Nationality: Austrian
- Born: 2 May 1916
- Died: 17 September 1974 (aged 58)

Sport
- Sport: Rowing

Heinz Gattringer (2 May 1916 – 17 September 1974) was an Austrian rower. He competed in the men's coxless pair event at the 1936 Summer Olympics.
