= Miguel Lonegro =

Argentine sports shooter

Personal information
- Born: 13 January 1896
- Died: 30 December 1945 (aged 49)

Sport
- Sport: Sports shooting

Miguel Lonegro (13 January 1896 – 30 December 1945) was an Argentine sports shooter. He competed in the 50 m pistol event at the 1936 Summer Olympics.
