= Afonso de Castro =

Brazilian rower

Personal information
- Born: 10 December 1911; Campos dos Goytacazes, Brazil
- Died: 21 August 1980 (aged 68); Rio de Janeiro, Brazil

Sport
- Sport: Rowing

Afonso de Castro (10 December 1911 – 21 August 1980) was a Brazilian rower. He competed in the men's coxless pair event at the 1936 Summer Olympics.
