= Károly Győry =

Hungarian rower

Personal information
- Born: 10 February 1910 Budapest, Hungary
- Died: 24 December 1944 (aged 34)

Sport
- Sport: Rowing
Medal record
Men's rowing
Representing Hungary
European Rowing Championships
Gold medal – first place	1933 Budapest	Coxed pair
Gold medal – first place	1934 Lucerne	Coxed pair
Gold medal – first place	1934 Lucerne	Eight
Gold medal – first place	1935 Berlin	Coxless pair

Károly Győry (10 February 1910 – 24 December 1944) was a Hungarian rower.

Győry competed at the 1936 Summer Olympics in Berlin with the coxless pair alongside Tibor Mamusich where they came fourth. They also competed in the coxed pair, with László Molnár as coxswain, but they did not start in their semi-final race.
