= Eduardo Lehman =

Brazilian rower

Personal information
- Nationality: Brazilian
- Born: 28 April 1910

Sport
- Sport: Rowing

Eduardo Lehman (born 28 April 1910, date of death unknown) was a Brazilian rower. He competed in the men's coxless pair event at the 1936 Summer Olympics.
