= Vasile Crișan =

Romanian sports shooter

Personal information
- Born: 25 December 1905

Sport
- Sport: Sports shooting

Vasile Crișan (born 25 December 1905, date of death unknown) was a Romanian sports shooter. He competed in the 50 m pistol event at the 1936 Summer Olympics.
