= Baldomiro Benquet =

Uruguayan rower (1907–1980)

Personal information
- Nationality: Uruguayan
- Born: 1 June 1907
- Died: 3 December 1980 (aged 73)

Sport
- Sport: Rowing

Baldomiro Benquet (1 June 1907 – 3 December 1980) was a Uruguayan rower. He competed in the men's coxless pair event at the 1936 Summer Olympics.
