= Shooting at the 1936 Summer Olympics – Men's 50 metre pistol =

Olympic shooting event

Men's 50 metre pistol at the Games of the XI Olympiad
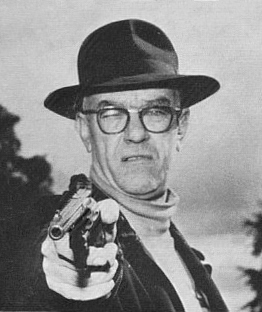
- Torsten Ullman
- Venue: Wannsee, Berlin, Germany
- Dates: 6–7 August
- Competitors: 43 from 19 nations
- Winning score: 559 WR

Medalists
1st place, gold medalist(s)		Torsten Ullman; Sweden
2nd place, silver medalist(s)		Erich Krempel; Germany
3rd place, bronze medalist(s)		Charles des Jammonières; France

The men's 50-metre pistol was a shooting sports event held as part of the Shooting at the 1936 Summer Olympics programme. It was the sixth appearance of the event. The competition was held on 6 and 7 August 1936 at the shooting ranges at Wannsee. 43 shooters from 19 nations competed. Nations were limited to three shooters each, as they had been for all individual shooting events since the 1932 Games. The event was won by Torsten Ullman of Sweden, the nation's first free pistol medal. Erich Krempel of Germany took silver (that nation's first medal in the event as well). Charles des Jammonières's bronze was France's first medal in the free pistol since 1900.

== Background ==
This was the sixth appearance of what would become standardised as the men's ISSF 50 meter pistol event. The event was held at every Summer Olympics from 1896 to 1920 (except 1904, when no shooting events were held) and from 1936 to 2016; it was nominally open to women from 1968 to 1980, although very few women participated these years. The event held in 1896 and 1908 were the only Games in which the distance was not 50 metres; the former used 30 metres and the latter 50 yards.

The two-time reigning (1933 and 1935) world champion was Torsten Ullman of Sweden. France's Charles des Jammonières was the runner-up in 1933; Germany's Erich Krempel had finished second in 1935.

Argentina, Czechoslovakia, Italy, Monaco, the Philippines, Portugal, and Romania each made their debut in the event. Greece and the United States each made their fifth appearance, tied for most of any nation.

Ullman used an Udo Anschütz Record 210.

== Competition format ==
The competition had each shooter fire 60 shots, in 10 series of 6 shots each, at a distance of 50 metres. The target was round, 50 centimetres in diameter, with 10 scoring rings. Scoring for each shot was up to 10 points, in increments of 1 point. The maximum score possible was 600 points. Any pistol was permitted. "Glasses" could not be attached. The time limit for the full 60 shots was two hours. Ties were broken first by hits, then by bulls-eyes (7s and above), then by 10s, then by 9s, etc., then by the closest to the center of the last shot.

== Records ==
Prior to this competition, the existing world and Olympic records were as follows.

World record	Torsten Ullman (SWE)	547		1935
Olympic record	Karl Röderer (SUI)	503	Paris, France	1 August 1900

The top 33 shooters broke the 36-year-old Olympic record, with the 34th tying it. Erich Krempel held the new Olympic record at the end of the first day, but Torsten Ullman had not shot yet. Ullman competed on the second day, breaking the world record by 12 points.

== Schedule ==
On 6 August, the shooters from Argentina, Chile, Italy, Norway, Portugal, Romania, Czechoslovakia, Hungary, USA, and Germany started. On the following day the shooters of all other countries competed. The competition started on both days at 8 a.m.

On the first day it was dry with fairly overcast sky. The wind influenced the competition at times during the morning. On the second day it was sunny in the morning and fairly overcast in the afternoon. In general the weather was warmer and there was no wind.

Date	Time	Round
Thursday, 6 August 1936; Friday, 7 August 1936	8:00	Final

== Results ==
Rank	Shooter	Nation	Round 1	Round 2	Round 3	Round 4	Round 5	Round 6	Total
1st place, gold medalist(s)	Torsten Ullman	Sweden	95	92	94	91	92	95	559
2nd place, silver medalist(s)	Erich Krempel	Germany	87	88	91	92	95	91	544
3rd place, bronze medalist(s)	Charles des Jammonières	France	91	92	86	91	90	90	540
4	Marcel Bonin	France	92	90	91	86	89	90	538
5	Tapio Wartiovaara	Finland	95	86	86	88	93	89	537
6	Elliott Jones	United States	92	90	83	92	90	89	536
7	Georgios Stathis	Greece	90	89	92	89	87	85	532
8	Aatto Nuora	Finland	86	89	90	86	92	89	532
9	Sándor Tölgyesi	Hungary	87	88	88	90	90	85	528
10	Bertalan Zsótér	Hungary	87	85	88	84	92	89	525
11	Mauritz Amundsen	Norway	89	87	92	86	84	87	525
12	Paul Wehner	Germany	90	84	88	87	88	88	525
13	Marcel Lafortune	Belgium	83	87	89	85	85	95	524
14	Roberto Müller	Chile	88	89	83	85	83	93	521
15	Jaakko Rintanen	Finland	89	85	83	88	89	86	520
16	Carlos Lalanne	Chile	86	87	89	86	87	85	520
17	William Riedell	United States	82	87	85	89	84	92	519
18	Juan Rostagno	Argentina	90	85	88	80	89	87	519
19	Emil Martin	Germany	84	86	91	81	88	89	519
20	René Koch	France	82	89	88	90	80	90	519
21	Stefano Margotti	Italy	84	84	82	93	88	87	518
22	Julius Lehrmann	Denmark	81	86	91	88	84	88	518
23	Václav Krecl	Czechoslovakia	91	82	89	82	82	92	518
24	Helge Meuller	Sweden	85	85	82	88	87	90	517
25	Harvey Dias Villela	Brazil	82	84	87	87	85	90	515
26	Gustaf Bergström	Sweden	85	88	77	88	88	88	514
27	Miguel Lonegro	Argentina	87	79	87	85	90	85	513
28	Christen Møller	Denmark	84	90	82	85	87	85	513
29	Enrique Ojeda	Chile	86	88	80	89	85	84	512
30	Martin Gison	Philippines	80	82	86	92	82	89	511
31	Paul Van Asbroeck	Belgium	90	86	87	71	89	87	510
32	Giancarlo Boriani	Italy	80	85	86	90	79	86	506
33	Ralph Marshall	United States	91	87	84	82	83	78	505
34	Jan Koller	Czechoslovakia	84	82	87	81	86	83	503
35	Georgios Kontogiannis	Greece	81	85	85	86	83	82	502
36	Ugo Pistolesi	Italy	86	80	88	80	87	81	502
37	Otoniel Gonzaga	Philippines	84	79	84	84	83	87	501
38	Herman Schultz	Monaco	82	79	85	82	87	81	496
39	François Lafortune	Belgium	75	78	90	89	84	79	495
40	Moysés Cardoso	Portugal	79	80	84	82	86	79	490
41	Louis Briano	Monaco	73	72	79	87	80	76	467
42	Vasile Crişan	Romania	73	65	72	71	80	85	446
43	Victor Bonafède	Monaco	61	79	74	79	68	72	433
