= Luigi Luxardo =

Italian rower

Personal information
- Nationality: Italian
- Born: 27 April 1914; Santa Margherita Ligure, Italy
- Died: 2 November 2006 (aged 92); Santa Margherita Ligure, Italy

Sport
- Sport: Rowing

Luigi Luxardo (27 April 1914 – 2 November 2006) was an Italian rower. He competed in the men's coxless four at the 1936 Summer Olympics.
