= Frigyes Pabsz =

Hungarian rower (1914–1945)

Personal information
- Born: 4 July 1914 Pula, Hungary
- Died: 28 December 1945 (aged 31)

Sport
- Sport: Rowing
- Club: Hungária Evezős Egylet
Medal record
Men's rowing
Representing Hungary
European Rowing Championships
Gold medal – first place	1934 Lucerne	Eight

Frigyes Sándor Pabsz (4 July 1914 – 28 December 1945) was a Hungarian rower. He competed at the 1936 Summer Olympics in Berlin with the men's coxless four where they were eliminated in the semi-final.
