= René Koch =

French sports shooter

Personal information
- Born: 1 February 1895
- Died: 5 January 1978 (aged 82)

Sport
- Sport: Sports shooting

René Koch (1 February 1895 – 5 January 1978) was a French sports shooter. He competed in the 50 m pistol event at the 1936 Summer Olympics.
