= Wilhelm Pichler =

Austrian rower

Personal information
- Born: 25 April 1908 Linz, Austria-Hungary
- Died: unknown

Sport
- Sport: Rowing
Medal record
Men's rowing
Representing Austria
European Rowing Championships
Silver medal – second place	1935 Berlin	Coxless four

Wilhelm Pichler (25 April 1908 – ?) was an Austrian rower. He competed at the 1936 Summer Olympics in Berlin with the men's coxless four where they came fifth.
