= Ryszard Borzuchowski =

Polish rower

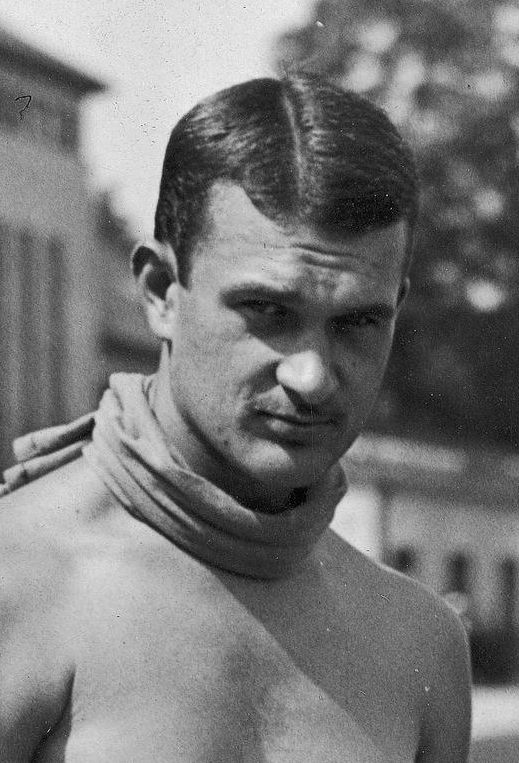
- Ryszard Borzuchowski in 1935

Personal information
- Nationality: Polish
- Born: 6 August 1910; Warsaw, Russian Empire
- Died: 7 July 1981 (aged 70); Victoria, British Columbia, Canada

Sport
- Sport: Rowing

Ryszard Borzuchowski (6 August 1910 – 7 July 1981) was a Polish rower. He competed in the men's coxless pair event at the 1936 Summer Olympics.
