= Peter Pietras =

American soccer player

Personal information
- Full name: Peter Paul Pietras
- Date of birth: April 21, 1908
- Place of birth: Trenton, New Jersey, United States
- Date of death: April 15, 1993
- Place of death: New Jersey, United States
- Height: 5 ft 4 in (1.63 m)
- Position: Midfielder

Senior career*
| Years | Team | Apps | (Gls) |
| 1933–1938 | Philadelphia German-Americans | | |

International career
| 1934–1936 | United States | 3 | (0) |
- * Club domestic league appearances and goals

Peter Pietras (April 21, 1908 – April 15, 1993) was a U.S. soccer player who was a member of the U.S. national team at the 1934 FIFA World Cup and the 1936 Summer Olympics. He also played five seasons in the American Soccer League. He was an accomplished amateur golfer in the later part of his life.

== Professional career ==
Pietras began his professional career with the Philadelphia German-Americans of the American Soccer League in 1933. He spent five seasons with Philadelphia, winning the 1935 league title and the 1936 National Challenge Cup championship. He retired from playing professionally in 1938.

== National and Olympic teams ==
In 1934, Pietras earned two caps with the U.S. national team. His first game was a U.S. victory over Mexico, 4–2, in a World Cup qualifier. His second was the lone U.S. game at the 1934 FIFA World Cup. In that game, the U.S. lost to Italy in the first round of the cup.

In 1936, Pietras was selected for the U.S. soccer team which competed at the 1936 Summer Olympics. The U.S. lost 1–0 to Italy and was eliminated in the first round.
