= Tibor Vadai =

Hungarian rower

Personal information
- Nationality: Hungarian
- Born: 13 February 1913

Sport
- Sport: Rowing

Tibor Vadai (born 13 February 1913, date of death unknown) was a Hungarian rower. He competed in the men's coxless four at the 1936 Summer Olympics.
