= Louis Briano =

Monegasque sports shooter (1891–1966)

Personal information
- Born: 25 February 1891
- Died: 19 December 1966 (aged 75)

Sport
- Sport: Sports shooting

Louis Briano (25 February 1891 – 19 December 1966) was a Monegasque sports shooter. He competed in the 50 m pistol event at the 1936 Summer Olympics.
