= Alex Homberger =

Swiss rower

Personal information
- Born: 26 October 1912 Schaffhausen
- Died: 15 April 2007 (aged 94) Muskegon, Michigan, United States

Sport
- Sport: Rowing
Medal record
Men's rowing
Representing Switzerland
Olympic Games
Silver medal – second place	1936 Berlin	Coxed four
Bronze medal – third place	1936 Berlin	Coxless four
European Rowing Championships
Silver medal – second place	1934 Lucerne	Coxless four
Gold medal – first place	1935 Berlin	Coxless four
Silver medal – second place	1935 Berlin	Eight

Alexander H. Homberger (26 October 1912 – 15 April 2007) was a Swiss rower who competed in the 1936 Summer Olympics in three boat classes.

He was born in Schaffhausen and died in Muskegon, Michigan, United States.

In 1936, he was a crew member of the Swiss boat that won the silver medal in the coxed four event. As part of the Swiss boat in the coxless four competition he won the bronze medal. He also participated in the eight event where the Swiss boat finished sixth.
