= James Thomson (rower) =

American rower

Personal information
- Nationality: American
- Born: October 31, 1910; Glasgow, Scotland
- Died: May 31, 1962 (aged 51); Dayton, Ohio, United States

Sport
- Sport: Rowing

James Thomson (October 31, 1910 – May 31, 1962) was an American rower. He competed in the men's coxless four at the 1936 Summer Olympics.
