= George Dahm =

American rower

Personal information
- Born: July 11, 1916 Philadelphia, Pennsylvania, United States
- Died: August 9, 1980 (aged 64) Belleville, Michigan, United States

Sport
- Sport: Rowing

George Dahm (July 11, 1916 – August 9, 1980) was an American rower. He competed in the men's coxless pair event at the 1936 Summer Olympics.
