= Charles Morton (cyclist) =

American cyclist

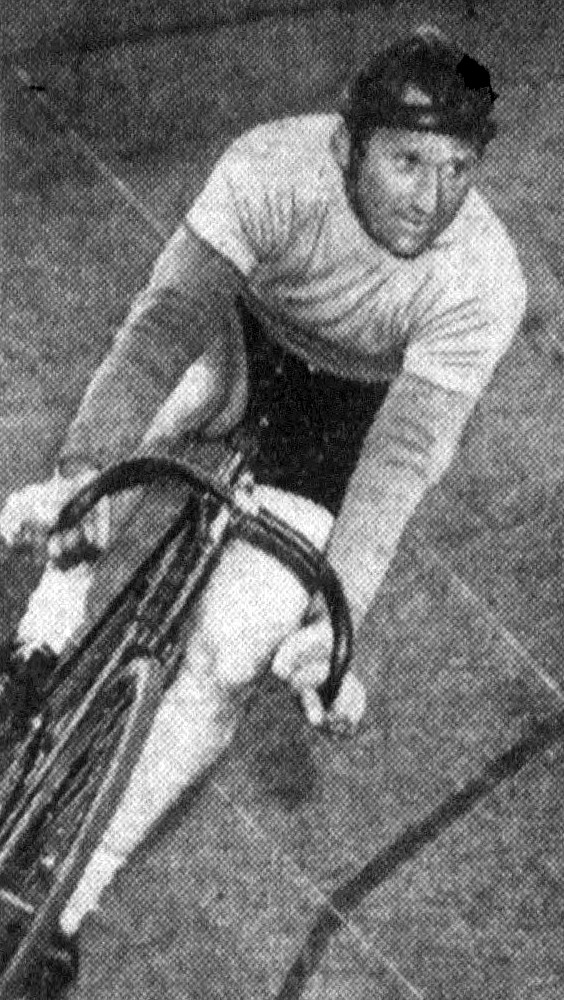
- Morton, circa 1953

Personal information
- Born: October 1, 1916 Long Beach, California, United States
- Died: December 20, 1996 (aged 80) Bakersfield, California, United States

Cycling career
- Sport: Cycling

Charles Morton (October 1, 1916 – December 20, 1996) was an American cyclist. He competed in three events at the 1936 Summer Olympics.
