= William Riedell =

American sports shooter (1904–1952)

Personal information
- Born: February 22, 1904 New York City, United States
- Died: November 29, 1952 (aged 48) Washington, D.C., United States

Sport
- Sport: Sports shooting

William Frederick Riedell (February 22, 1904 – November 29, 1952) was an American naval officer, engineer and sports shooter. He competed in the 50 m pistol event at the 1936 Summer Olympics.

== Early life ==
Riedell was born on February 22, 1904, in New York and grew up there. He graduated from Cooper Union College.

== Shooting career ==
Riedell, a member of the Manhattan Revolver and Pistol Club, tied a national record and set a world record at a National Rifle Association of America competition at Camp Perry on September 13, 1935. In the .22 caliber 50-meter range competition, he shot ten straight bullseyes and had the maximum score of 100 points, tying the national record. He later set a world record, shooting 97 out of a possible 100 at another match. The previous record was 96.

In 1936, Riedell was selected to the U.S. International Shooting team which participated in the 1936 Summer Olympics at Berlin. Shortly before the team was to leave New York for Berlin, the New York police raided Riedell's house and confiscated his target pistols. Riedell had the gun permits, but the precinct chief had decided there were "too many guns and gun owners and he was going to straighten that out." He eventually got his guns back with the help of Karl Frederick. In Berlin, Riedell competed at the free pistol, 50 metres men event and placed seventeenth.

In 1937, Riedell set a US record by hitting 150 consecutive bullseyes in a competition, stopping with a lead of more than 100 bullseyes over his nearest opponent.

== Later life and death ==
Riedell was later an engineer in New York until being drafted for World War II in the early 1940s. In 1946, he was released, having achieved the rank of lieutenant commander in the Navy Reserves. He later worked at the Navy Bureau of Ordnance and the Naval Ordnance Laboratory. He was a life member of the National Rifle Association.

Riedell died on November 29, 1952, at the age of 48. He was buried at the Arlington National Cemetery.
