= Martin Karl =

German rower (1911–1942)

Personal information
- Born: 3 June 1911 Würzburg, German Empire
- Died: 1 March 1942 (aged 30) Mikhaylovka, Volgograd Oblast, Soviet Union

Sport
- Sport: Rowing
- Club: Würzburger RV Bayern
Medal record
Men's rowing
Representing Nazi Germany
Olympic Games
Gold medal – first place	1936 Berlin	Coxless four
European Rowing Championships
Gold medal – first place	1934 Lucerne	Coxless four

Martin Karl (3 June 1911 – 1 March 1942) was a German rower who competed in the 1936 Summer Olympics.

In 1936 he won the gold medal as member of the German boat in the coxless four competition. He was killed during WWII while serving on the Eastern Front.
