= George Hague =

American rower

Personal information
- Born: June 30, 1915 Buffalo, New York, United States
- Died: May 28, 1989 (aged 73) Thonotosassa, Florida, United States

Sport
- Sport: Rowing

George Hague (June 30, 1915 – May 28, 1989) was an American rower. He competed in the men's coxless four at the 1936 Summer Olympics.
