= Anton Rom =

German rower

Personal information
- Born: Carl Anton Rom; 10 March 1909 Würzburg, Germany
- Died: 30 December 1994 (aged 85) Würzburg, Germany

Sport
- Sport: Rowing
- Club: Würzburger RV Bayern
Medal record
Men's rowing
Representing Nazi Germany
Olympic Games
Gold medal – first place	1936 Berlin	Coxless four
European Rowing Championships
Gold medal – first place	1934 Lucerne	Coxless four
Gold medal – first place	1935 Berlin	Coxed four

Carl Anton Rom (10 March 1909 – 30 December 1994), known as Toni Rom, was a German rower who competed in the 1936 Summer Olympics.

In 1936 he won the gold medal as member of the German boat in the coxless four competition.
