= Richard Olsen =

Danish rower (1911–1956)

Personal information
- Born: Peter Richard Olsen; 31 October 1911 Sorø
- Died: 13 February 1956 (aged 44) Sorø

Sport
- Sport: Rowing
- Club: Sorø Roklub
Medal record
Men's rowing
Representing Denmark
Olympic Games
Silver medal – second place	1936 Berlin	Coxless pair
European Rowing Championships
Silver medal – second place	1929 Bydgoszcz	Coxed four
Gold medal – first place	1930 Liège	Coxed four
Silver medal – second place	1931 Paris	Coxed four
Silver medal – second place	1932 Belgrade	Coxed four
Gold medal – first place	1933 Budapest	Coxless four
Silver medal – second place	1937 Amsterdam	Coxless pair
Bronze medal – third place	1938 Milan	Coxless pair

Peter Richard Olsen (31 October 1911 – 13 February 1956) was a Danish rower who competed in the 1936 Summer Olympics.

In 1936 he won the silver medal with his partner Harry Larsen in the coxless pairs competition.
