= Harry Sharkey =

American rower

Personal information
- Born: August 24, 1916 Philadelphia, Pennsylvania, United States
- Died: November 22, 2002 (aged 86) Newton Square, Pennsylvania, United States

Sport
- Sport: Rowing

Harry Sharkey (August 24, 1916 – November 22, 2002) was an American rower. He competed in the men's coxless pair event at the 1936 Summer Olympics.
