= Francesco Pittaluga =

Italian rower (1913–2016)

Personal information
- Nationality: Italian
- Born: 11 October 1913 Santa Margherita Ligure, Italy
- Died: 10 February 2016 (aged 102)

Sport
- Sport: Rowing
Medal record
Men's rowing
Representing Italy
European Rowing Championships
Silver medal – second place	1938 Milan	M4-

Francesco Pittaluga (11 October 1913 – 10 February 2016) was an Italian rower. He competed in the men's coxless four at the 1936 Summer Olympics.
