= Hermann Betschart =

Swiss rower (1910–1950)

Personal information
- Born: 19 December 1910
- Died: 30 June 1950 (aged 39)
Medal record
Men's rowing
Representing Switzerland
Olympic Games
Silver medal – second place	1936 Berlin	Coxed four
Bronze medal – third place	1936 Berlin	Coxless four
European Rowing Championships
Silver medal – second place	1934 Lucerne	Coxless four
Gold medal – first place	1935 Berlin	Coxless four
Silver medal – second place	1937 Amsterdam	Coxless four
Gold medal – first place	1938 Milan	Coxless four
Bronze medal – third place	1947 Lucerne	Coxless four

Hermann Betschart (19 December 1910 – 30 June 1950) was a Swiss rower who competed in the 1936 Summer Olympics. In 1936 he was a crew member of the Swiss boat which won the silver medal in the coxed fours event. As part of the Swiss boat in the coxless fours competition he won the bronze medal. He also participated in the eight event where the Swiss boat finished sixth.
