= Hugo Strauß =

German rower

Personal information
- Born: 25 June 1907 Mannheim, German Empire
- Died: 3 November 1941 (aged 34) Golodayeva, Sverdlovsk, Soviet Union

Sport
- Sport: Rowing
- Club: Mannheimer RC
Medal record
Men's rowing
Representing Nazi Germany
Olympic Games
Gold medal – first place	1936 Berlin	Coxless pair

Hugo Strauß (25 June 1907 – 3 November 1941) was a German rower who competed in the 1936 Summer Olympics.

In 1936 he won the gold medal with his partner Willi Eichhorn in the coxless pair competition. Strauß was 29 at the time he won, it was also the only time he was in the Olympics. Also in 1936 Germany went on to win the Olympics that year. He was killed during WWII while serving on the Eastern Front.
