= Rudolf Eckstein =

German rower

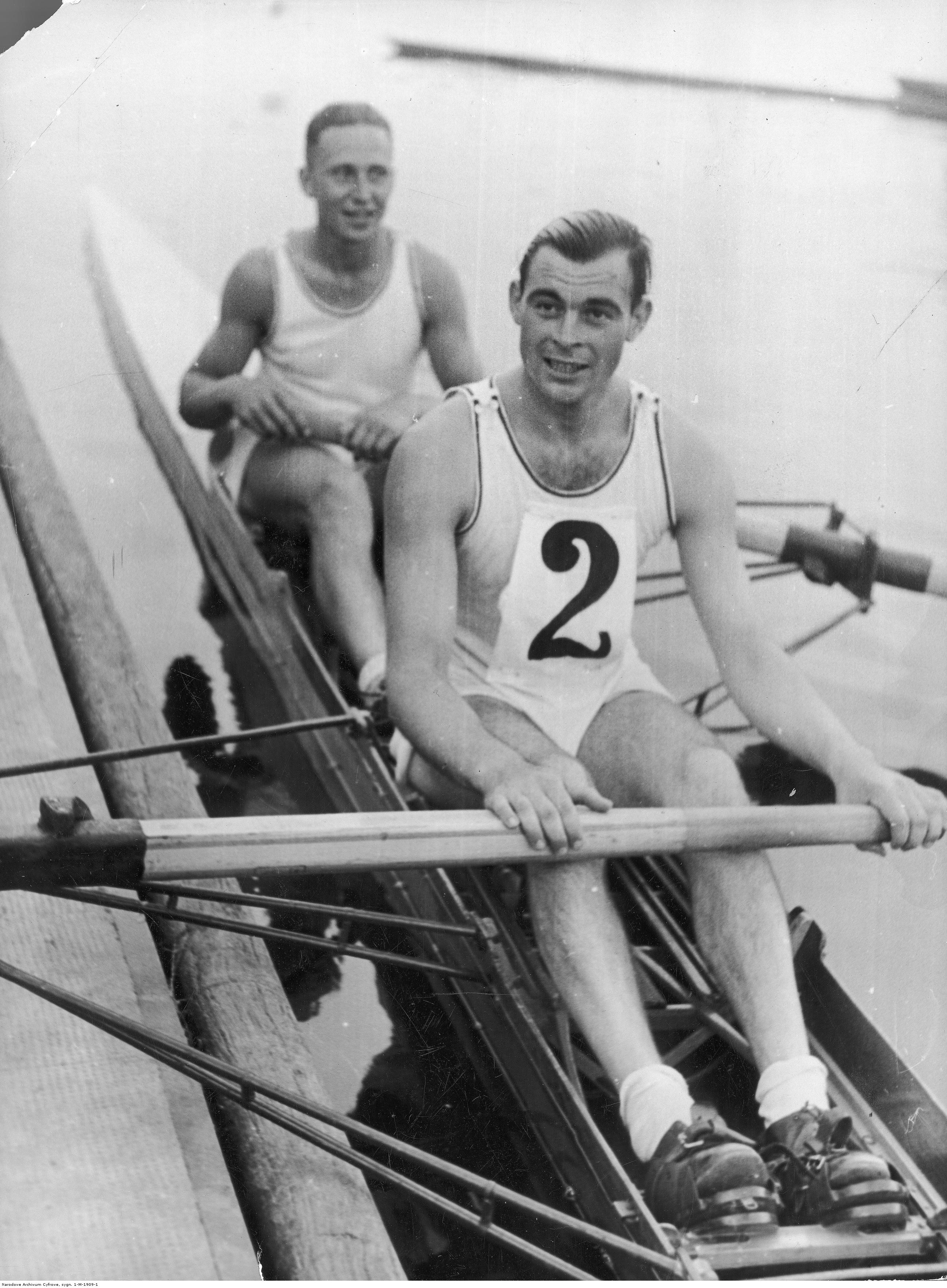
- Eckstein (bow) with Heinrich Stelzer in 1938

Personal information
- Born: 1 January 1915
- Died: 25 May 1993 (aged 78)

Sport
- Sport: Rowing
- Club: Würzburger RV Bayern
Medal record
Men's rowing
Representing Nazi Germany
Olympic Games
Gold medal – first place	1936 Berlin	Coxless four
European Rowing Championships
Gold medal – first place	1934 Lucerne	Coxless four
Gold medal – first place	1935 Berlin	Coxed four
Gold medal – first place	1938 Milan	Coxless pair

Rudolf Eckstein (1 January 1915 – 25 May 1993) was a German rower who competed in the 1936 Summer Olympics.

In 1936 he won the gold medal as member of the German boat in the coxless four competition.
