= Harry Larsen =

Danish rower (1915–1974)

Personal information
- Born: Harry Julius Larsen; 4 September 1915 Kirkerup, Slagelse Municipality
- Died: 12 August 1974 (aged 58) Copenhagen

Sport
- Sport: Rowing
Medal record
Men's rowing
Representing Denmark
Olympic Games
Silver medal – second place	1936 Berlin	Coxless pair
European Rowing Championships
Silver medal – second place	1937 Amsterdam	Coxless pair

Harry Julius Larsen (4 September 1915 – 12 August 1974) was a Danish rower who competed in the 1936 Summer Olympics.

Larsen was born in Kirkerup, Slagelse Municipality, in 1915. In 1936, he won the silver medal with his partner Richard Olsen in the coxless pair competition. He died in 1974 in Copenhagen.
