= Albert Byrd =

American cyclist

Personal information
- Born: November 28, 1915 Chicago, Illinois, United States
- Died: June 26, 1990 (aged 74) Tampa, Florida, United States

Cycling career
- Sport: Cycling

Albert Byrd (November 28, 1915 – June 26, 1990) was an American cyclist. He competed in three events at the 1936 Summer Olympics.

In the 100KM road race Byrd suffered a broken chain near the Olympic Village and retired from the race. The pursuit team of Byrd, Charles Morton, William Logan and John Sinibaldi finished ninth.

After living most of his life in Chicago, he moved to Tampa, where he died in 1990. He was a World War II veteran, in which he was awarded both the Silver Star and the Purple Heart. After the war he worked as a construction engineer.
