= Emil Boje Jensen =

Danish rower (1911–1964)

Personal information
- Born: Hans Emil Boje Jensen; 28 August 1911 Sorø, Denmark
- Died: 16 August 1964 (aged 52) Copenhagen, Denmark

Sport
- Sport: Rowing
- Club: Københavns Roklub
Medal record
Men's rowing
Representing Denmark
European Rowing Championships
Silver medal – second place	1934 Lucerne	Eight
Bronze medal – third place	1937 Amsterdam	Eight

Hans Emil Boje Jensen (28 August 1911 – 16 August 1964) was a Danish rower. He competed in the 1936 Summer Olympics in Berlin with the men's eight where they came sixth.
