= John Sinibaldi =

American cyclist

Personal information
- Born: October 2, 1913 Brooklyn, New York, United States
- Died: January 10, 2006 (aged 92) St. Petersburg, Florida, United States

Cycling career
- Sport: Cycling

John Sinibaldi (October 2, 1913 – January 10, 2006) was an American cyclist. He competed at the 1932 and 1936 Summer Olympics.
