= Elliott Jones (sport shooter) =

American sports shooter

Personal information
- Born: January 24, 1908 Syracuse, New York, United States
- Died: February 15, 1994 (aged 86) Carson City, Nevada, United States

Sport
- Sport: Sports shooting

Elliott Jones (January 24, 1908 – February 15, 1994) was an American sports shooter. He competed in the 50 m pistol event at the 1936 Summer Olympics.
