= Alfred Sapecky =

American rower

Personal information
- Born: February 7, 1913 New York, New York, U.S.
- Died: February 28, 1999 (aged 86) Cape Coral, Florida, U.S.

Sport
- Sport: Rowing

Alfred Sapecky (February 7, 1913 – February 28, 1999) was an American rower. He competed in the men's coxless four at the 1936 Summer Olympics.
