= Matthew Christopher Pietras =

American socialite and arts patron

- Died: May 2025; United States
- Occupations: Personal assistant, philanthropist
- Known for: Donations to cultural institutions; posthumous fraud revelations

Matthew Christopher Pietras worked as a personal assistant to collector and philanthropist Courtney Sale Ross, widow of Time Warner founder Steven J. Ross, as well as to conceptual artist Gregory Soros, son of George Soros. After his sudden death by suicide in May 2025, it was revealed that his lifestyle had been largely based on stolen money.

The cultural institutions that Pietras donated millions to are dealing with the consequences of receiving stolen funds. The Frick Collection received between $1 million and $4.99 million from Pietras, enough to endow a position — the “Matthew Christopher Pietras Head of Music and Performance”. In response to the theft allegations, a representative said, "The Frick had no reason to believe that any of the contributions were made with misappropriated funds," even as Ross and Soros are exploring how to reclaim any stolen funds. The Metropolitan Opera, however, which had been expecting a $10 million dollar gift from Pietras when the transfer was flagged as fraudulent two days prior to his death, has had to dip into its endowment to address the shortfall. This shortfall has happened at a time when cultural institutions are especially vulnerable in their quest for new donors and donations. Moreover, nonprofits that receive stolen money, may be obligated to return it to the victims of the theft, putting further pressure—administrative and financial—on organizations like the Metropolitan Opera and the Frick that Pietras gave money to.
