= Eugene Fruehauf =

American rower

Personal information
- Born: November 1, 1912 Buffalo, New York, United States
- Died: September 13, 1998 (aged 85) North Tonawanda, New York, United States

Sport
- Sport: Rowing

Eugene Fruehauf (November 1, 1912 – September 13, 1998) was an American rower. He competed in the men's coxless four at the 1936 Summer Olympics.
