= Willi Eichhorn =

German rower

Personal information
- Born: 23 August 1908
- Died: 24 May 1994 (aged 85)

Sport
- Sport: Rowing
- Club: Mannheimer RC
Medal record
Men's rowing
Representing Nazi Germany
Olympic Games
Gold medal – first place	1936 Berlin	Coxless pair

Willi Eichhorn (23 August 1908 – 24 May 1994) was a German rower who competed in the 1936 Summer Olympics. In 1936 he won the gold medal with his partner Hugo Strauß in the coxless pairs competition for men, He was only 27 at the time. This was also his only time competing in the Olympics. Germany also went on to win the most gold medals that year.
