= Wilhelm Menne =

German rower

Personal information
- Born: Wilhelm Menne; 11 August 1910 Würzburg, Germany
- Died: 27 March 1945 (aged 34) Trenčín, Slovakia
- Height: 183 cm (6 ft 0 in)
- Weight: 70 kg (154 lb)

Sport
- Sport: Rowing
- Club: Würzburger RV Bayern
Medal record
Men's rowing
Representing Nazi Germany
Olympic Games
Gold medal – first place	1936 Berlin	Coxless four
European Rowing Championships
Gold medal – first place	1934 Lucerne	Coxless four
Gold medal – first place	1935 Berlin	Coxed four

Wilhelm Menne (11 August 1910 – 27 March 1945), also known as Willi Menne, was a German rower who competed in the 1936 Summer Olympics where he won the gold medal as a member of the German crew in the coxless four competition. He was killed in Trenčín, Slovakia, while serving during WWII.
