= 1934 European Rowing Championships =

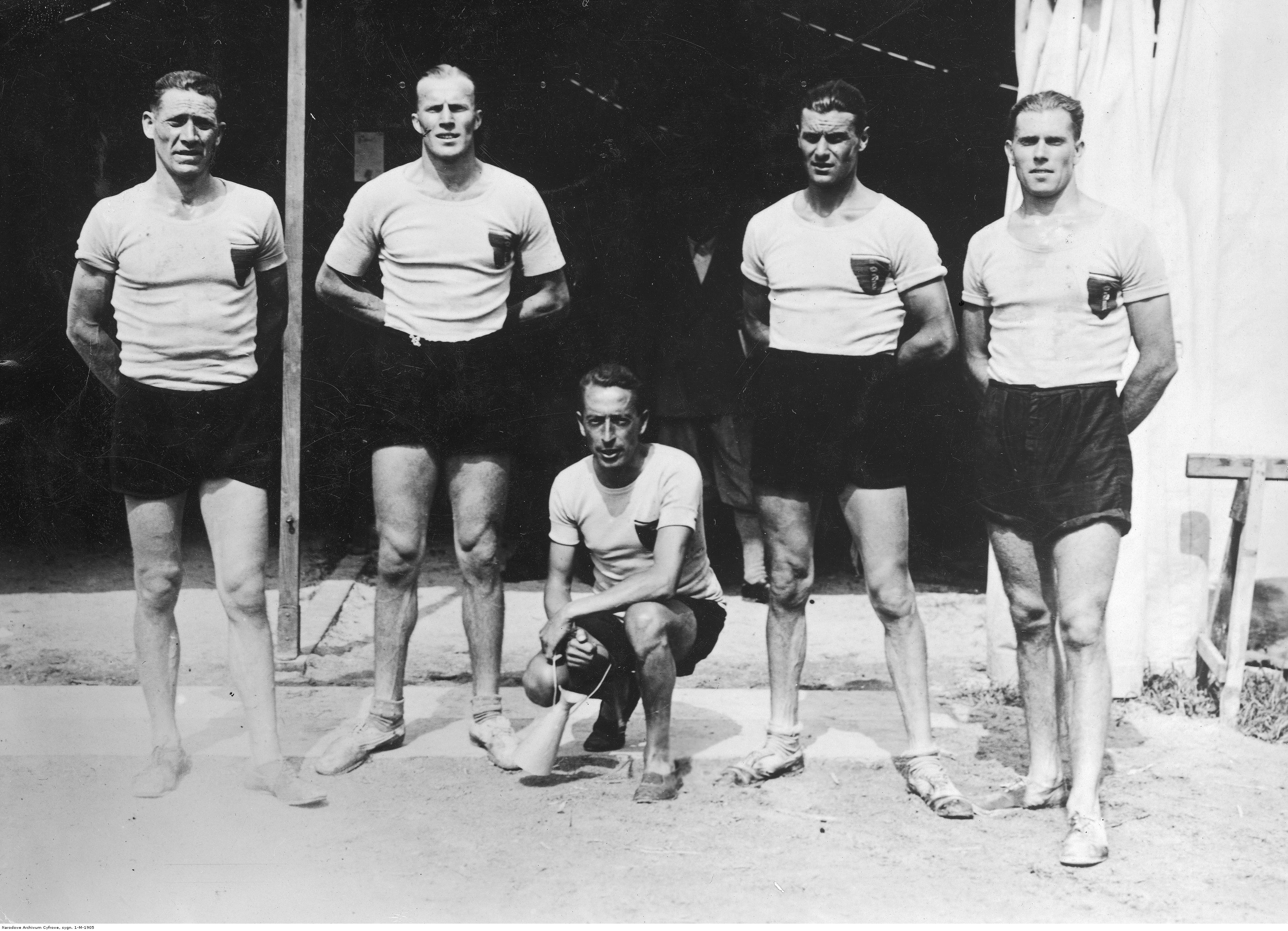
- A men's coxed four team in Lucerne
- Venue: Rotsee
- Location: Lucerne, Switzerland
- Dates: August

The 1934 European Rowing Championships were rowing championships held on the Rotsee in the Swiss city of Lucerne. The competition was for men only and they competed in all seven Olympic boat classes (M1x, M2x, M2-, M2+, M4-, M4+, M8+).

== Medal summary ==
Event	Gold		Silver		Bronze	
Event	Country & rowers	Time	Country & rowers	Time	Country & rowers	Time
M1x	Nazi Germany; Gustav Schäfer		Poland; Roger Verey		France; Vincent Saurin	
M2x	Switzerland; Helmut von Bidder; Hans Hottinger		France; Georges Frisch; Louis Hansotte		Denmark; Mogens Hee; Poul Hendriksen	
M2-	Austria; Anton Kopetzky; Robert Kopetzky		Nazi Germany; Herbert Braun; Hans-Georg Möllner		Switzerland; Hans Niklaus; Ernst Kopp	
M2+	Hungary; Károly Győry; Tibor Mamusich; László Molnár (cox)		France; Bernard Batillat; Alphonse Bouton; Claude Lowenstein (cox)		Netherlands; H. van Schagen; H. de Wiljes; B.J.L. Beunders (cox)	
M4-	Nazi Germany; Rudolf Eckstein; Anton Rom; Martin Karl; Wilhelm Menne		Switzerland; Karl Schmid; Alex Homberger; Max Schuler; Hermann Betschart		France; Charles Luraud; Jean Cottez; Louis Devillié; Émile Lecuirot	
M4+	Italy; Valerio Perentin; Francesco Chicco; Nicolò Vittori; Giovanni Delise; Renato Petronio (cox)		France; Marcel Chauvigné; Jean Cosmat; Marcel Vandernotte; Fernand Vandernotte; Noël Vandernotte (cox)		Yugoslavia; Slavko Alujevič; Elko Mrduljaš; P. Handrmann; Ivo Fabris; Marin Alujevič (cox)	
M8+	Hungary; Gyula Görk; Vilmos Éden; Ferenc Jancsó; Ákos Inotay; Frigyes Pabsz; Tibor Mamusich; Károly Győry; Alajos Szilassy; László Molnár (cox)		Denmark; Willy Sørensen; Knud Olsen; Ove Zøllner; Sigfred Sørensen; Carl Berner; Remond Larsen; Emil Boje Jensen; Poul Knudsen; Harry Gregersen (cox)		Italy; Antonio Garzoni Provenzani; Ito del Favore; Carlo del Favore; Guglielmo del Neri; Lucillo Bobig; Enzo Rampelli; Gastone de Angelis; Antonio Ghiardello; Emilio Gerolimini (cox)	
