= Horacio Podestá =

Argentine rower

Oscar Casanovas
Personal information
- Born: 26 July 1911 Buenos Aires, Argentina
- Died: 15 July 1999 (aged 87)
Medal record
Men's rowing
Representing Argentina
Bronze medal – third place	1936 Berlin	Coxless pair

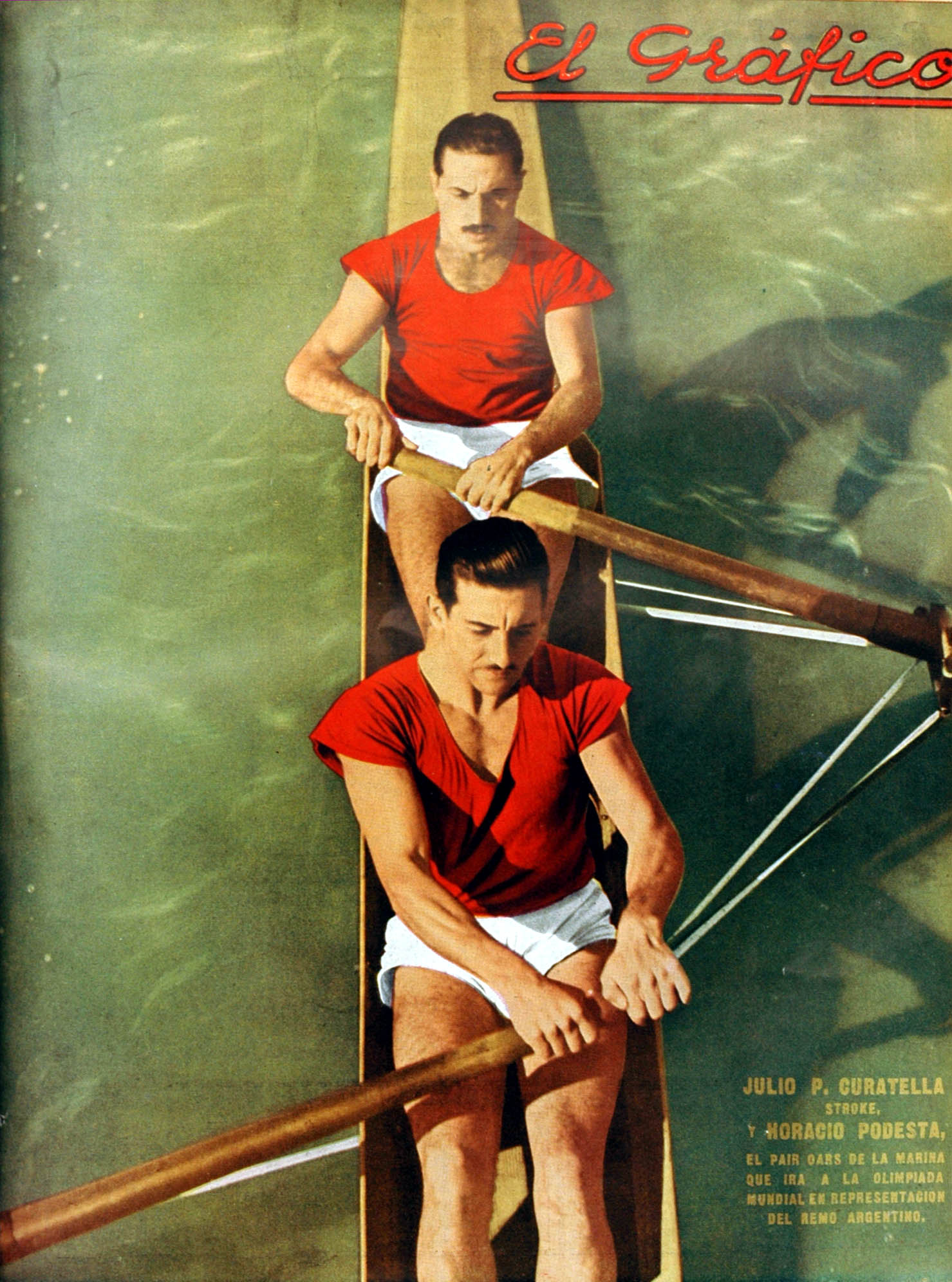
Julio Curatella and Horacio Podestá - The graphic 882.jpg

Horacio Podestá (26 July 1911 – 15 July 1999) was an Argentine rower who competed in the 1936 Summer Olympics.

In 1936 he won the bronze medal with his partner Julio Curatella in the coxless pairs competition.
