= Ralph Marshall (sport shooter) =

American sports shooter

Personal information
- Born: May 17, 1894 Lima, Ohio, United States
- Died: November 7, 1981 (aged 87) Harrod, Ohio, United States

Sport
- Sport: Sports shooting

Ralph Stanford Marshall (May 17, 1894 – November 7, 1981) was an American sports shooter. He competed in the 50 m pistol event at the 1936 Summer Olympics. He was also a motorcycle dealer, board track racer, and owned a sporting goods in Lima, Ohio. From 1935 to 1937, he was sheriff of Allen County, Ohio.
