= Giacomo Briano =

Polish Jesuit & architect (1589–1649)

Giacomo Briano (1589–1649) was a Polish Jesuit and architect of Italian descent. He worked in Poland from 1617 to 1621 and from 1630 to 1632.

He was educated before entering (in 1607) the Society of Jesus. He knew the work of Pellegrino Tibaldi very well, his work is characterized by evident borrowings from the works of this architect. Briano was also well versed in architectural theory, as evidenced by the fact that he asked the General of the Order for permission to comment on architectural treatises.

Between 1613 and 1616 he completed the construction of the college in Castiglione, prepared the design of the college in Mirandola (completed 1619–1621), began the construction of the church of Santa Maria Maggiore (1627–1630) in Trieste according to his design, and in 1632 he designed the church of St. Vitus in Rijeka (Fiume).

He stayed in Poland twice: between 1617 and 1621 and in 1630–1632. He was the chief architect of the Polish Province. He designed the Jesuit church in Łuck (now the cathedral) (1617-162)), in Lviv (1620-1621), Ostroh (non-existent, demolished in the 19th century) (1630-1632), the college at the church in Lublin (1620), as well as the Gostomski chapel at the non-existent church of the Order in Sandomierz. According to his designs, the church of St. John in Jarosław was extended. He probably also participated in the construction of the Church of the Blessed Virgin Mary. St. Peter and Paul in Kraków (1619). While working in Italy, he drew up designs for the church in Przemyśl (ca. 1622) (ultimately unrealized).
