= Julio Curatella =

Argentine rower (1911–1995)

Personal information
- Born: 27 February 1911
- Died: 1995 (aged 83–84) Buenos Aires, Argentina
Medal record
Men's rowing
Representing Argentina
Bronze medal – third place	1936 Berlin	Coxless pair

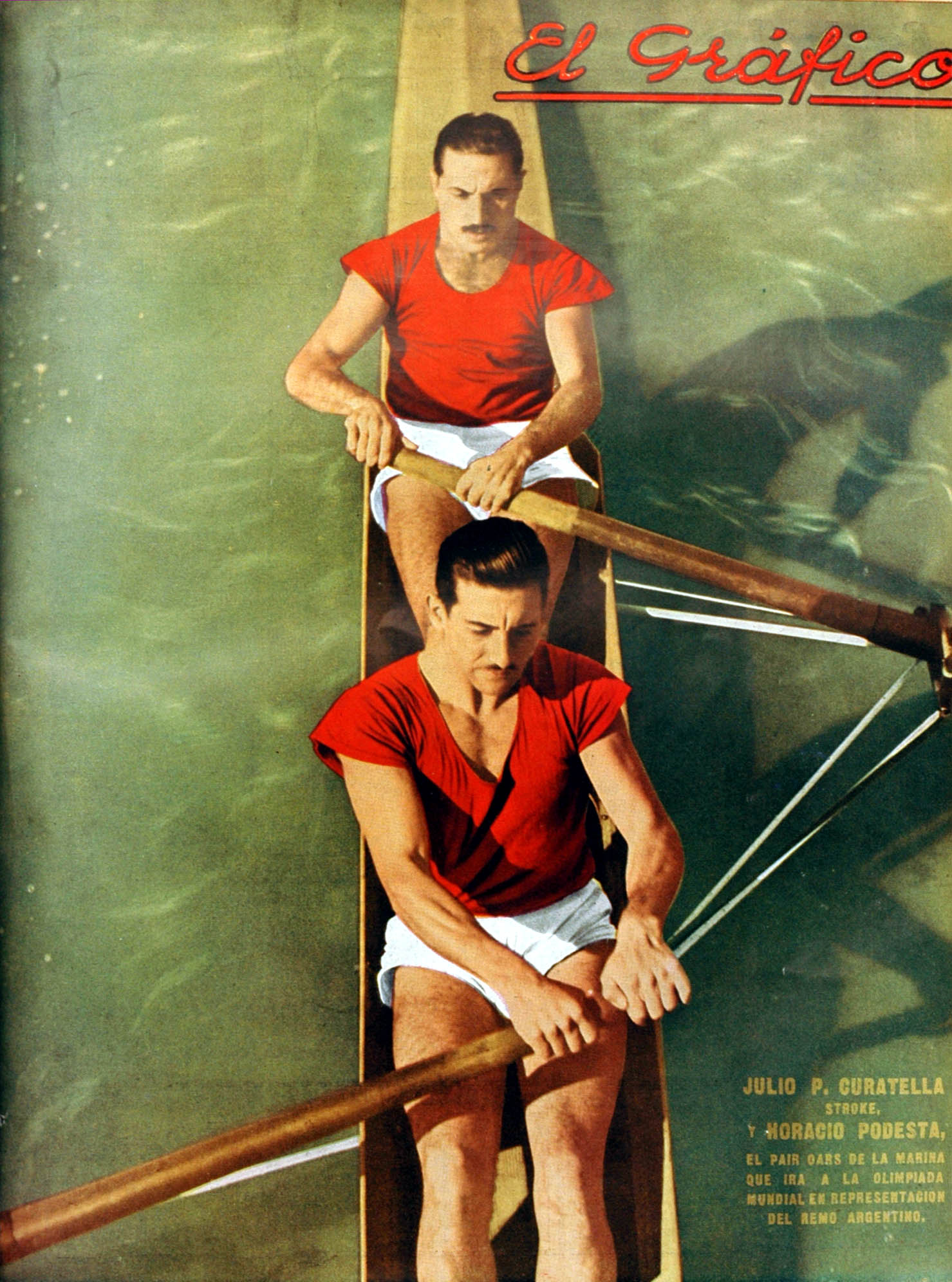
Julio Curatella and Horacio Podesta - The Graphic 882.jpg

Julio Pedro Curatella (27 February 1911 – 1995) was an Argentine rower who competed in the 1936 Summer Olympics.

In 1936 he won the bronze medal with his partner Horacio Podestá in the coxless pairs competition.

Twelve years later he was a member of the Argentine boat which was eliminated in the repêchage of the coxless four event.
