= Karl Schmid (rower) =

Swiss rower

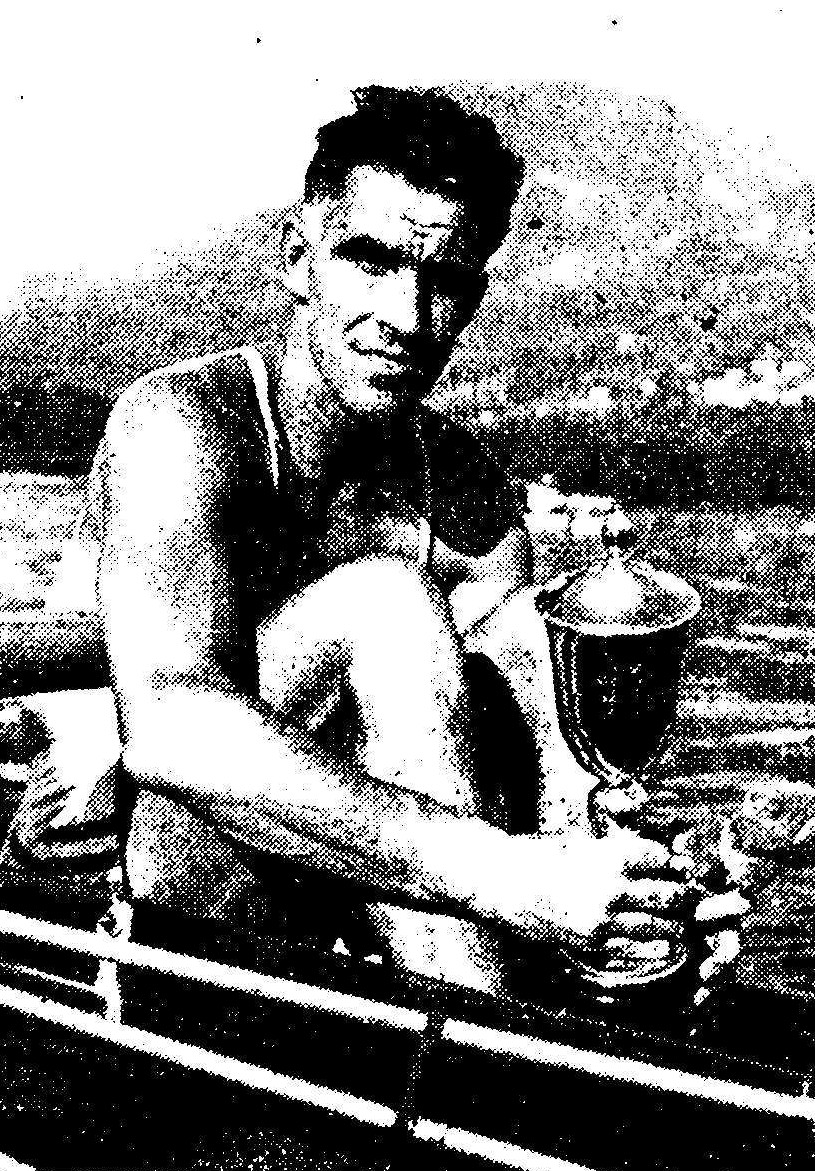
- Karl Schmid at the International Regattas in Lugano 6. September 1942

Personal information
- Born: 29 June 1910
- Died: 14 May 1998 (aged 87)
- Relatives: Kurt Schmid (son)

Sport
- Sport: Rowing
Medal record
Men's rowing
Representing Switzerland
Olympic Games
| Silver medal – second place | 1936 Berlin | Coxed four |
| Bronze medal – third place | 1936 Berlin | Coxless four |
European Rowing Championships
| Silver medal – second place | 1934 Lucerne | Coxless four |
| Gold medal – first place | 1935 Berlin | Coxless four |
| Silver medal – second place | 1937 Amsterdam | Coxless four |
| Gold medal – first place | 1938 Milan | Coxless four |
| Bronze medal – third place | 1947 Lucerne | Coxless four |

Karl Schmid (29 June 1910 – 14 May 1998) was a Swiss rower who competed in the 1936 Summer Olympics.

Schmid was born in 1910. In 1936 he was a crew member of the Swiss boat which won the silver medal in the coxed four event. As part of the Swiss boat in the coxless four competition he won the bronze medal. He also participated in the eight event where the Swiss boat finished sixth.

His son, Kurt Schmid, rowed in the 1952 and 1960 Summer Olympics.
