= John Sturrock (rower) =

English rower

Personal information
- Nationality: British (English)
- Born: 20 March 1915 Weymouth, England
- Died: 20 July 1974 (aged 59) Peterborough, England

Sport
- Sport: Rowing
- Club: London Rowing Club
Medal record
Men's rowing
Representing Great Britain
Olympic Games
Silver medal – second place	1936 Berlin	Coxless four
Representing England
British Empire Games
Gold medal – first place	1938 Sydney	Eight

John Duncan "Jan" Sturrock OBE (20 March 1915 – 20 July 1974) was an English rower who competed for Great Britain at the 1936 Summer Olympics.

== Biography ==
Born in Weymouth, Dorset, Sturrock was educated at Winchester College and then Magdalen College, Oxford. He rowed for the London Rowing Club.

At the 1936 Summer Olympics in Berlin, Sturrock was a member of the British boat which won the silver medal in the coxless four event.

He represented England at the 1938 British Empire Games in Sydney, Australia, where he competed in the eights event, winning a gold medal.
