= Alan Barrett (rower) =

British rower (1912–1961)

Medal record

Men's rowing

Representing Great Britain

Olympic Games
Silver medal – second place	1936 Berlin	Coxless four

Alan John Barrett (14 November 1912 – 8 April 1961) was a British rower who competed in the 1936 Summer Olympics.

In 1936 he was a crew member of the British boat which won the silver medal in the coxless four event.
