= Fencing at the 1920 Summer Olympics – Men's sabre =

Men's sabre at the Games of the VII Olympiad
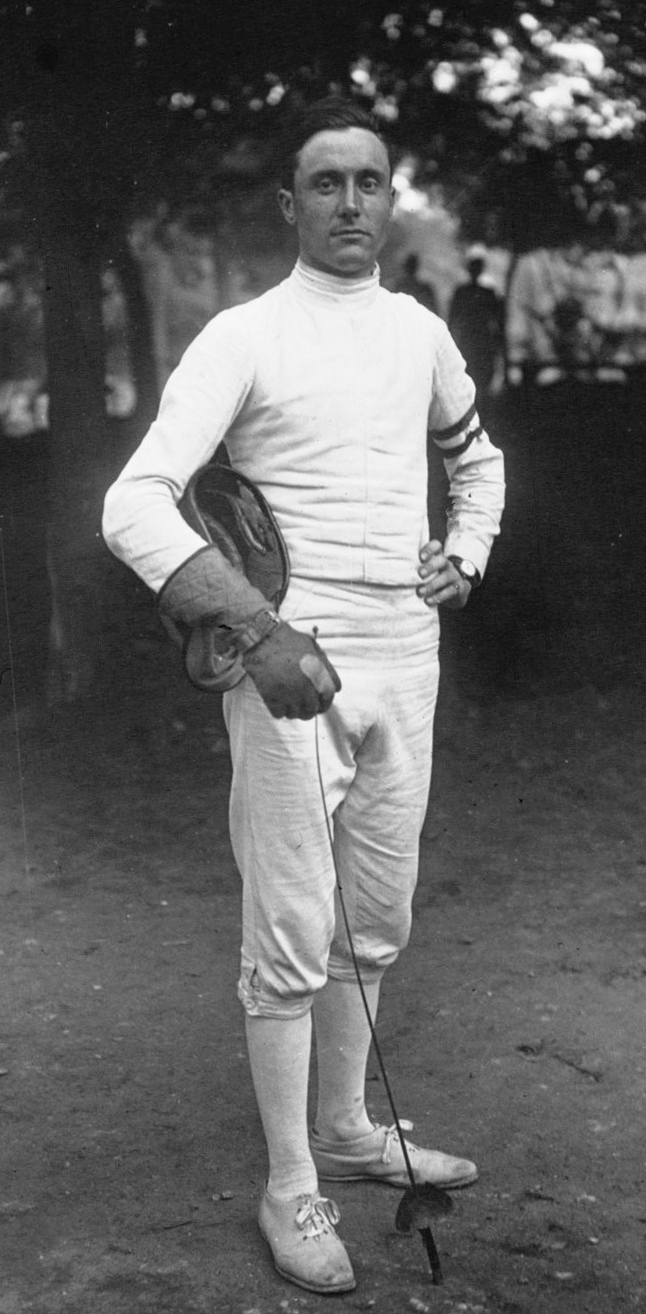
- Nedo Nadi (1919)
- Venue: Gardens de la Palace d'Egmont
- Dates: August 25–26, 1920
- Competitors: 43 from 9 nations

Medalists
1st place, gold medalist(s)		Nedo Nadi	Italy
2nd place, silver medalist(s)		Aldo Nadi	Italy
3rd place, bronze medalist(s)		Adrianus de Jong	Netherlands

The men's sabre was a fencing event held as part of the Fencing at the 1920 Summer Olympics programme in Antwerp, Belgium. It was the sixth appearance of the event. A total of 43 fencers from 9 nations competed in the event, which was held on August 25 and August 26, 1920. Nations were limited to eight fencers each. The event was won by Nedo Nadi of Italy, one of his five gold medals in 1920. His brother Aldo Nadi took silver. Adrianus de Jong of the Netherlands finished third. They were the first medals in the individual men's sabre for both countries. This was the only time from 1908 to 1964 that Hungary did not win the men's sabre—with no Hungarian fencers competing after the nation was disinvited after World War I.

== Background ==
This was the sixth appearance of the event, which is the only fencing event to have been held at every Summer Olympics. Seven of the eight finalists from 1912 had been Hungarian; with Hungary not invited to the 1920 Games in the aftermath of World War I, none of those seven could return. The other finalist, however, was Nedo Nadi of Italy—the heavy favorite with no Hungarians competing (and with 1919 Inter-Allied champion Vincent Gillens of Belgium not attending either).

Czechoslovakia made its debut in the men's sabre. Italy and Denmark each made their fourth appearance in the event, tying Austria (also not invited to the Games following the war) for most of any nation.

== Competition format ==
The event used a three-round format. In each round, the fencers were divided into pools to play a round-robin within the pool. Bouts were to three touches (an unpopular change from the more typical five). Standard sabre rules were used, including that the target area was the now-standard target above the waist (in contrast to the larger target in 1912 and the whole body in 1896, 1900, and 1908).

- Quarterfinals: There were 5 pools of between 7 and 9 fencers each. The top 4 fencers in each quarterfinal advanced to the semifinals, except that the top 5 in quarterfinal C advanced (with two men tied for fourth, the tie was not broken and both advanced).
- Semifinals: There were 3 pools of 7 fencers each. The top 4 fencers in each semifinal advanced to the final.
- Final: The final pool had 12 fencers.

== Schedule ==
Date	Time	Round
Wednesday, 25 August 1920	9:00; 14:00	Quarterfinals; Semifinals
Thursday, 26 August 1920		Final

== Results ==
=== Quarterfinals ===
==== Quarterfinal A ====
Rank	Fencer	Nation	Wins	Losses	Notes
1	Oreste Puliti	Italy	6	1	Q
2	Federico Cesarano	Italy	5	2	Q
3	Adrianus de Jong	Netherlands	5	2	Q
4	Aage Berntsen	Denmark	5	2	Q
5	Marc Perrodon	France	3	4	
6	Edwin Fullinwider	United States	2	5	
7	Alexandre Simonson	Belgium	1	6	
7	Eric Startin	Great Britain	1	6	

==== Quarterfinal B ====
Rank	Fencer	Nation	Wins	Losses	Notes
1	Aldo Nadi	Italy	6	1	Q
2	Robin Dalglish	Great Britain	5	2	Q
3	Félix Goblet	Belgium	4	3	Q
4	Henri Wijnoldij-Daniëls	Netherlands	4	3	Q
5	Wouter Brouwer	Netherlands	3	4	
5	Ronald Campbell	Great Britain	3	4	
7	Viliam Tvrský	Czechoslovakia	2	5	
8	John Dimond	United States	1	6	
—	Georges Trombert	France	DNF		

==== Quarterfinal C ====
Rank	Fencer	Nation	Wins	Losses	Notes
1	Nedo Nadi	Italy	5	1	Q
2	Robert Feyerick	Belgium	3	3	Q
3	Cecil Kershaw	Great Britain	3	3	Q
4	Baldo Baldi	Italy	3	3	Q
4	Josef Javůrek	Czechoslovakia	3	3	Q
6	Henri de Saint-Germain	France	2	4	
6	Clariborne Walker	United States	2	4	

==== Quarterfinal D ====
Rank	Fencer	Nation	Wins	Losses	Notes
1	Léon Tom	Belgium	6	1	Q
2	Francesco Gargano	Italy	5	2	Q
3	Giulio Rusconi	Italy	4	3	Q
4	Joseph Parker	United States	4	3	Q
5	Evangelos Skotidas	Greece	3	4	
5	Zdeněk Vávra	Czechoslovakia	3	4	
7	Félix Vigeveno	Netherlands	2	5	
8	Arthur Lyon	United States	1	6	
—	Jean Margraff	France	DNF		
—	Alfred Martin	Great Britain	DNF		

==== Quarterfinal E ====
Rank	Fencer	Nation	Wins	Losses	Notes
1	Jan van der Wiel	Netherlands	6	2	Q
2	Robert Hennet	Belgium	5	3	Q
3	Giorgio Santelli	Italy	5	3	Q
4	Herbert Huntington	Great Britain	5	3	Q
5	Jean Servent	France	4	4	
5	Vasilios Zarkadis	Greece	4	4	
7	Roscoe Bowman	United States	3	5	
7	Jaroslav Šourek	Czechoslovakia	3	5	
9	Frederick Cunningham	United States	1	7	

=== Semifinals ===
==== Semifinal A ====
Rank	Fencer	Nation	Wins	Losses	Notes
1	Henri Wijnoldij-Daniëls	Netherlands	4	2	Q
2	Léon Tom	Belgium	4	2	Q
3	Francesco Gargano	Italy	3	3	Q
4	Aldo Nadi	Italy	3	3	Q
5	Josef Javůrek	Czechoslovakia	3	3	
6	Cecil Kershaw	Great Britain	2	4	
6	Giorgio Santelli	Italy	2	4	

==== Semifinal B ====
Rank	Fencer	Nation	Wins	Losses	Notes
1	Nedo Nadi	Italy	6	0	Q
2	Baldo Baldi	Italy	5	1	Q
3	Jan van der Wiel	Netherlands	3	3	Q
4	Robin Dalglish	Great Britain	3	3	Q
5	Robert Feyerick	Belgium	3	3	
6	Joseph Parker	United States	1	5	
7	Félix Goblet	Belgium	0	6	

==== Semifinal C ====
Rank	Fencer	Nation	Wins	Losses	Notes
1	Federico Cesarano	Italy	5	1	Q
2	Adrianus de Jong	Netherlands	5	1	Q
3	Oreste Puliti	Italy	4	2	Q
4	Robert Hennet	Belgium	3	3	Q
5	Giulio Rusconi	Italy	3	3	
6	Herbert Huntington	Great Britain	1	5	
7	Aage Berntsen	Denmark	0	6	

=== Final ===
Rank	Fencer	Nation	Wins	Losses
1st place, gold medalist(s)	Nedo Nadi	Italy	11	0
2nd place, silver medalist(s)	Aldo Nadi	Italy	9	2
3rd place, bronze medalist(s)	Adrianus de Jong	Netherlands	6	5
4	Oreste Puliti	Italy	6	5
5	Jan van der Wiel	Netherlands	6	5
6	Léon Tom	Belgium	5	6
7	Robert Hennet	Belgium	5	6
8	Robin Dalglish	Great Britain	5	6
9	Henri Wijnoldij-Daniëls	Netherlands	4	7
10	Federico Cesarano	Italy	3	8
11	Francesco Gargano	Italy	3	8
12	Baldo Baldi	Italy	3	8
