= Fencing at the 1920 Summer Olympics – Men's team sabre =

Men's team sabre at the Games of the VII Olympiad
- Venue: Gardens de la Palace d'Egmont
- Date: August 26, 1920
- Competitors: ? from 8 nations

Medalists
1st place, gold medalist(s)		Baldo Baldi, Antonio Allochio, Federico Cesarano, Francesco Gargano, Aldo Nadi, Nedo Nadi, Oreste Puliti, Giorgio Santelli, Dino Urbani; Italy
2nd place, silver medalist(s)		Jean Margraff, Marc Perrodon, Henri de Saint-Germain, Georges Trombert; France
3rd place, bronze medalist(s)		Willem van Blijenburgh, Louis Delaunoy, Jetze Doorman, Adrianus de Jong, Jan van der Wiel, Salomon Zeldenrust; Netherlands

The men's team sabre was a fencing event held as part of the Fencing at the 1920 Summer Olympics programme. It was the third appearance of the event.

Eight nations competed.

== Rosters ==
Belgium

- Robert Hennet
- Pierre Calle
- Léon Tom
- Alexandre Simonson
- Robert Feyerick
- Charles Delporte
- Harry Bombeeck

Czechoslovakia

- Josef Javůrek
- Otakar Švorčík
- František Dvořák
- Antonín Mikala
- Josef Jungmann

Denmark

- Ivan Osiier
- Poul Rasmussen
- Ejnar Levison
- Aage Berntsen
- Verner Bonde

France

- Georges Trombert
- Jean Margraff
- Marc Perrodon
- Henri de Saint Germain

Great Britain

- Alfred Ridley-Martin
- William Marsh
- Bill Hammond
- Cecil Kershaw
- Ronald Campbell
- Robin Dalglish
- Herbert Huntington

Italy

- Nedo Nadi
- Aldo Nadi
- Oreste Puliti
- Baldo Baldi
- Francesco Gargano
- Giorgio Santelli
- Dino Urbani

Netherlands

- Jan van der Wiel
- Arie de Jong
- Jetze Doorman
- Louis Delaunoij
- Willem Hubert van Blijenburgh
- Salomon Zeldenrust
- Henri Wijnoldy-Daniëls

United States

- Edwin Fullinwider
- Arthur Lyon
- John Dimond
- Frederick Cunningham
- Claiborne Walker
- Bradford Fraley
- Roscoe Bowman

== Results ==
=== Final ===
Final
Place	Team	Wins	Losses
Gold	Italy	7	0
Silver	France	6	1
Bronze	Netherlands	5	2
4	Belgium	4	3
5	United States	3	4
6	Denmark	2	5
7	Great Britain	1	6
8	Czechoslovakia	0	7
