= Italy national fencing team =

Italian team in international fencing competitions

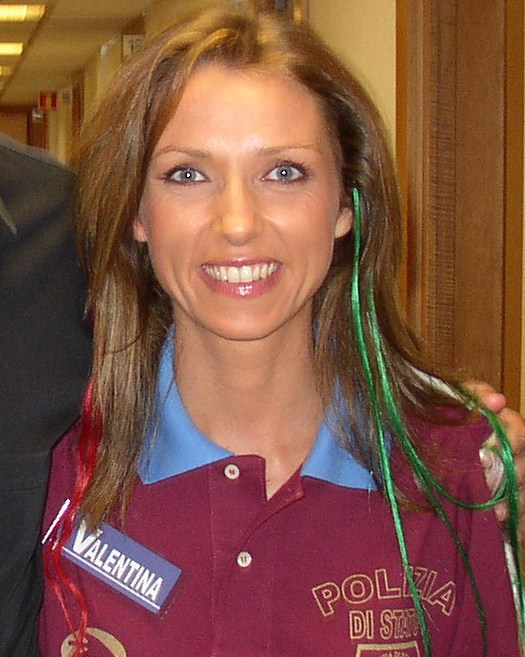
Valentina Vezzali, 44 medals between Olympic Games, World and European Championships.

The Italy national fencing team represents Italy in International fencing competitions such as Olympic Games or World Fencing Championships.

== History ==
The national Italian fencing team participated to all the Summer Olympics editions, from Paris 1900, 26 times on 28.

== Medal tables ==
| Event | Editions | 1st edition | Men | | | | Women | | | | Total | | | | Ranking |
|---|---|---|---|---|---|---|---|---|---|---|---|---|---|---|---|
| Event | Editions | 1st edition | Gold medal | Silver medal | Bronze medal | Tot. | Gold medal | Silver medal | Bronze medal | Tot. | Gold medal | Silver medal | Bronze medal | Tot. | Ranking |
| Olympic Games | 26 | 1900 | 38 | 40 | 26 | 104 | 12 | 9 | 10 | 31 | 50 | 49 | 36 | 135 | 1st |
| World Championships | 59 | 1937 | | | | | | | | | 98 | 97 | 111 | 306 | 1st |
| European Championships | 22 | 1981 | | | | | | | | | 51 | 28 | 56 | 135 | 1st |

== Olympic Games ==
=== Medals by event ===
| Event | Men | | | Women | | |
|---|---|---|---|---|---|---|
| Event | Gold medal | Silver medal | Bronze medal | Gold medal | Silver medal | Bronze medal |
| Épée | 7 | 3 | 5 | 0 | 1 | 0 |
| Team Épée | 8 | 4 | 3 | 1 | 1 | 1 |
| Foil | 9 | 6 | 8 | 7 | 5 | 6 |
| Team Foil | 7 | 6 | 1 | 4 | 2 | 3 |
| Sabre | 2 | 8 | 4 | 0 | 0 | 0 |
| Team Sabre | 4 | 12 | 5 | 0 | 0 | 0 |
| Masters Sabre | 1 | 1 | 0 | - | - | - |
| Total | 38 | 40 | 26 | 12 | 9 | 10 |

=== Paris 1900 ===
| Event | Gold 1 | Silver 1 | Bronze 0 |
|---|---|---|---|
Men
| Masters Sabre | Antonio Conte | Italo Santelli | |

=== London 1908 ===
| Event | Gold 0 | Silver 1 | Bronze 0 |
|---|---|---|---|
Men
| Team Sabre | | Marcello Bertinetti; Riccardo Nowak; Abelardo Olivier; Alessandro Pirzio Biroli; Sante Ceccherini | |

=== Stockholm 1912 ===
| Event | Gold 1 | Silver 1 | Bronze 0 |
|---|---|---|---|
Men
| Individual Foil | Nedo Nadi | Pietro Speciale | |

=== Antwerp 1920 ===
| Event | Gold 5 | Silver 1 | Bronze 0 |
|---|---|---|---|
Men
| Individual Foil | Nedo Nadi | | |
| Individual Sabre | Nedo Nadi | Aldo Nadi | |
| Team Foil | Aldo Nadi; Nedo Nadi; Abelardo Olivier; Pietro Speciale; Rodolfo Terlizzi; Oreste Puliti; Tommaso Constantino; Baldo Baldi | | |
| Team Épée | Aldo Nadi; Nedo Nadi; Abelardo Olivier; Giovanni Canova; Dino Urbani; Tullio Bozza; Andrea Marrazzi; Antonio Allochio; Tommaso Constantino; Paolo Thaon di Revel | | |
| Team Sabre | Aldo Nadi; Nedo Nadi; Francesco Gargano; Oreste Puliti; Giorgio Santelli; Dino Urbani; Federico Cesarano; Baldo Baldi | | |

=== Paris 1924 ===
| Event | Gold 1 | Silver 0 | Bronze 1 |
|---|---|---|---|
Men
| Team Épée | | | Giulio Basletta; Marcello Bertinetti; Giovanni Canova; Vincenzo Cuccia; Virgilio Mantegazza; Oreste Moricca |
| Team Sabre | Renato Anselmi; Guido Balzarini; Marcello Bertinetti; Bino Bini; Vincenzo Cuccia; Oreste Moricca; Oreste Puliti; Giulio Sarrocchi | | |

=== Los Angeles 1932 ===
| Event | Gold 2 | Silver 4 | Bronze 2 |
|---|---|---|---|
Men
| Individual Épée | Giancarlo Cornaggia-Medici | | Carlo Agostoni |
| Team Épée | | Saverio Ragno; Giancarlo Cornaggia-Medici; Franco Riccardi; Carlo Agostoni; Renzo Minoli | |
| Individual Foil | Gustavo Marzi | | Giulio Gaudini |
| Team Foil | | Giulio Gaudini; Gustavo Marzi; Ugo Pignotti; Gioachino Guaragna; Rodolfo Terlizzi; Giorgio Pessina | |
| Individual Sabre | | Giulio Gaudini | |
| Team Sabre | | Gustavo Marzi; Giulio Gaudini; Renato Anselmi; Emilio Salafia; Arturo De Vecchi; Ugo Pignotti | |

=== Berlin 1936 ===
| Event | Gold 4 | Silver 3 | Bronze 2 |
|---|---|---|---|
Men
| Individual Épée | Franco Riccardi | Saverio Ragno | Giancarlo Cornaggia-Medici |
| Team Épée | Alfredo Pezzana; Edoardo Mangiarotti; Saverio Ragno; Giancarlo C. Cornaggia-Medici; Giancarlo Brusati; Franco Riccardi | | |
| Individual Foil | Giulio Gaudini | | Giorgio Bocchino |
| Team Foil | Giorgio Bocchino; Manlio Di Rosa; Gioachino Guaragna; Ciro Verratti; Giulio Gaudini; Gustavo Marzi | | |
| Individual Sabre | | Gustavo Marzi | |
| Team Sabre | | Vincenzo Pinton; Aldo Masciotta; Athos Tanzini; Aldo Montano; Gustavo Marzi; Giulio Gaudini | |

=== London 1948 ===
| Event | Gold 1 | Silver 4 | Bronze 1 |
|---|---|---|---|
Men
| Individual Épée | Luigi Cantone | | Edoardo Mangiarotti |
| Team Épée | | Luigi Cantone; Marc Antonio Mandruzzato; Carlo Agostoni; Edoardo Mangiarotti; Fiorenzo Marini; Dario Mangiarotti | |
| Team Foil | | Saverio Ragno; Renzo Nostini; Manlio Di Rosa; Giorgio Pellini; Edoardo Mangiarotti; Giuliano Nostini | |
| Individual Sabre | | Vincenzo Pinton | |
| Team Sabre | | Carlo Turcato; Gastone Darè; Vincenzo Pinton; Mauro Racca; Renzo Nostini; Aldo Montano | |

=== Helsinki 1952 ===
| Event | Gold 3 | Silver 4 | Bronze 1 |
|---|---|---|---|
Men
| Individual Épée | Edoardo Mangiarotti | Dario Mangiarotti | |
| Team Épée | Roberto Battaglia; Carlo Pavesi; Franco Bertinetti; Giuseppe Delfino; Dario Mangiarotti; Edoardo Mangiarotti | | |
| Individual Foil | | Edoardo Mangiarotti | Manlio Di Rosa |
| Team Foil | | Giancarlo Bergamini; Antonio Spallino; Manlio Di Rosa; Giorgio Pellini; Edoardo Mangiarotti; Renzo Nostini | |
| Team Sabre | | Giorgio Pellini; Vincenzo Pinton; Renzo Nostini; Mauro Racca; Gastone Darè; Roberto Ferrari | |
Women
| Individual Foil | Irene Camber | | |

=== Melbourne 1956 ===
| Event | Gold 3 | Silver 2 | Bronze 2 |
|---|---|---|---|
Men
| Individual Épée | | Giancarlo Bergamini | Antonio Spallino |
| Team Épée | Vittorio Lucarelli; Luigi Arturo Carpaneda; Manlio Di Rosa; Giancarlo Bergamini; Antonio Spallino; Edoardo Mangiarotti | | |
| Individual Foil | Carlo Pavesi | Giuseppe Delfino | Edoardo Mangiarotti |
| Team Foil | Giuseppe Delfino; Franco Bertinetti; Alberto Pellegrino; Giorgio Anglesio; Carlo Pavesi; Edoardo Mangiarotti | | |

=== Rome 1960 ===
| Event | Gold 2 | Silver 1 | Bronze 3 |
|---|---|---|---|
Men
| Individual Épée | Giuseppe Delfino | | |
| Team Épée | Giuseppe Delfino; Alberto Pellegrino; Carlo Pavesi; Edoardo Mangiarotti; Fiorenzo Marini; Gianluigi Saccaro | | |
| Team Foil | | Alberto Pellegrino; Luigi Carpaneda; Mario Curletto; Aldo Aureggi; Edoardo Mangiarotti | |
| Individual Sabre | | | Wladimiro Calarese |
| Team Sabre | | | Wladimiro Calarese; Giampaolo Calanchini; Pierluigi Chicca; Roberto Ferrari; Mario Ravagnan |
Women
| Team Foil | | | Bruna Colombetti; Velleda Cesari; Claudia Pasini; Irene Camber; Antonella Ragno |

=== Tokyo 1964 ===
| Event | Gold 0 | Silver 2 | Bronze 1 |
|---|---|---|---|
Men
| Team Épée | | Giovan Battista Breda; Giuseppe Delfino; Gianfranco Paolucci; Alberto Pellegrino; Gianluigi Saccaro | |
| Team Sabre | | Giampaolo Calanchini; Wladimiro Calarese; Pier-Luigi Chicca; Mario Ravagnan; Cesare Salvadori | |
Women
| Individual Foil | | | Antonella Ragno |

=== Mexico City 1968 ===
| Event | Gold 0 | Silver 1 | Bronze 1 |
|---|---|---|---|
Men
| Individual Épée | | | Gianluigi Saccaro |
| Team Sabre | | Wladimiro Calarese; Giampaolo Calanchini; Pierluigi Chicca; Roberto Ferrari; Mario Ravagnan | |

=== Munich 1972 ===
| Event | Gold 2 | Silver 0 | Bronze 0 |
|---|---|---|---|
Men
| Team Sabre | Michele Maffei; Mario Aldo Montano; Mario Tullio Montano; Rolando Rigoli; Cesare Salvadori | | |
Women
| Individual Foil | Antonella Ragno | | |

=== Montreal 1976 ===
| Event | Gold 1 | Silver 3 | Bronze 0 |
|---|---|---|---|
Men
| Individual Foil | Fabio Dal Zotto | | |
| Team Foil | | Fabio dal Zotto; Carlo Montano; Stefano Simoncelli; Giovanni Battista Coletti; Attilio Calatroni | |
| Team Sabre | | Mario Aldo Montano; Michele Maffei; Angelo Arcidiacono; Tommaso Montano; Mario Tullio Montano | |
Women
| Individual Foil | | Maria Consolata Collino | |

=== Moscow 1980 ===
| Event | Gold 0 | Silver 1 | Bronze 0 |
|---|---|---|---|
Men
| Team Sabre | | Michele Maffei; Mario Aldo Montano; Marco Romano; Ferdinando Meglio | |

=== Los Angeles 1984 ===
| Event | Gold 3 | Silver 1 | Bronze 3 |
|---|---|---|---|
Men
| Team Épée | | | Stefano Bellone; Sandro Cuomo; Cosimo Ferro; Roberto Manzi; Angelo Mazzoni |
| Individual Foil | Mauro Numa | | Stefano Cerioni |
| Team Foil | Mauro Numa; Andrea Borella; Stefano Cerioni; Angelo Scuri; Andrea Cipressa | | |
| Individual Sabre | | Marco Marin | |
| Team Sabre | Marco Marin; Gianfranco Dalla Barba; Giovanni Scalzo; Ferdinando Meglio; Angelo Arcidiacono | | |
Women
| Individual Foil | | | Dorina Vaccaroni |

=== Seoul 1988 ===
| Event | Gold 1 | Silver 1 | Bronze 2 |
|---|---|---|---|
Men
| Individual Foil | Stefano Cerioni | | |
| Individual Sabre | | | Giovanni Scalzo |
| Team Sabre | | | Massimo Cavaliere; Gianfranco Dalla Barba; Marco Marin; Ferdinando Meglio; Giovanni Scalzo |
Women
| Team Foil | | Francesca Bortolozzi; Annapia Gandolfi; Lucia Traversa; Dorina Vaccaroni; Margherita Zalaffi | |

=== Barcelona 1992 ===
| Event | Gold 2 | Silver 1 | Bronze 0 |
|---|---|---|---|
Men
| Individual Sabre | | Marco Marin | |
Women
| Individual Foil | Giovanna Trillini | | |
| Team Foil | Diana Bianchedi; Francesca Bortolozzi; Giovanna Trillini; Dorina Vaccaroni; Margherita Zalaffi | | |

=== Atlanta 1996 ===
| Event | Gold 3 | Silver 2 | Bronze 2 |
|---|---|---|---|
Men
| Team Épée | Sandro Cuomo; Angelo Mazzoni; Maurizio Randazzo | | |
| Individual Foil | Alessandro Puccini | | |
| Team Sabre | | | Raffaello Caserta; Luigi Tarantino; Toni Terenzi |
Women
| Team Épée | | Laura Chiesa; Elisa Uga; Margherita Zalaffi | |
| Individual Foil | | Valentina Vezzali | Giovanna Trillini |
| Team Foil | Francesca Bortolozzi-Borella; Giovanna Trillini; Valentina Vezzali | | |

=== Sydney 2000 ===
| Event | Gold 3 | Silver 0 | Bronze 2 |
|---|---|---|---|
Men
| Team Épée | Angelo Mazzoni; Paolo Milanoli; Maurizio Randazzo; Alfredo Rota | | |
| Team Foil | | | Daniele Crosta; Gabriele Magni; Salvatore Sanzo; Matteo Zennaro |
Women
| Individual Foil | Valentina Vezzali | | Giovanna Trillini |
| Team Foil | Diana Bianchedi; Giovanna Trillini; Valentina Vezzali | | |

=== Athens 2004 ===
| Event | Gold 3 | Silver 3 | Bronze 1 |
|---|---|---|---|
Men
| Individual Foil | | Salvatore Sanzo | Andrea Cassarà |
| Team Foil | Salvatore Sanzo; Andrea Cassarà; Simone Vanni | | |
| Individual Sabre | Aldo Montano | | |
| Team Sabre | | Aldo Montano; Giampiero Pastore; Luigi Tarantino | |
Women
| Individual Foil | Valentina Vezzali | Giovanna Trillini | |

=== Beijing 2008 ===
| Event | Gold 2 | Silver 0 | Bronze 5 |
|---|---|---|---|
Men
| Individual Épée | Matteo Tagliariol | | |
| Team Épée | | | Stefano Carozzo; Diego Confalonieri; Alfredo Rota; Matteo Tagliariol |
| Individual Foil | | | Salvatore Sanzo |
| Team Sabre | | | Aldo Montano; Luigi Tarantino; Giampiero Pastore; Diego Occhiuzzi |
Women
| Individual Foil | Valentina Vezzali | | Margherita Granbassi |
| Team Foil | | | Valentina Vezzali; Giovanna Trillini; Margherita Granbassi; Ilaria Salvatori |

=== London 2012 ===
| Event | Gold 3 | Silver 2 | Bronze 2 |
|---|---|---|---|
Men
| Team Foil | Valerio Aspromonte; Giorgio Avola; Andrea Baldini; Andrea Cassarà | | |
| Individual Sabre | | Diego Occhiuzzi | |
| Team Sabre | | | Aldo Montano; Diego Occhiuzzi; Luigi Tarantino; Luigi Samele |
Women
| Individual Foil | Elisa Di Francisca | Arianna Errigo | Valentina Vezzali |
| Team Foil | Elisa Di Francisca; Arianna Errigo; Valentina Vezzali; Ilaria Salvatori | | |

=== Rio 2016 ===
| Event | Gold 1 | Silver 3 | Bronze 0 |
|---|---|---|---|
Men
| Team Épée | | Enrico Garozzo; Marco Fichera; Paolo Pizzo; Andrea Santarelli | |
| Individual Foil | Daniele Garozzo | | |
Women
| Individual Épée | | Rossella Fiamingo | |
| Individual Foil | | Elisa Di Francisca | |

=== Tokyo 2020 ===
| Event | Gold 0 | Silver 3 | Bronze 2 |
|---|---|---|---|
Men
| Individual Foil | | Daniele Garozzo | |
| Individual Sabre | | Luigi Samele | |
| Team Sabre | | Luca Curatoli; Luigi Samele; Enrico Berrè; Aldo Montano | |
Women
| Team Épée | | | Rossella Fiamingo; Federica Isola; Mara Navarria; Alberta Santuccio |
| Team Foil | | | Erica Cipressa; Arianna Errigo; Martina Batini; Alice Volpi |

=== Paris 2024 ===
| Event | Gold 1 | Silver 3 | Bronze 1 |
|---|---|---|---|
Men
| Individual Foil | | Filippo Macchi | |
| Individual Sabre | | | Luigi Samele |
| Team Foil | | Guillaume Bianchi; Filippo Macchi; Tommaso Marini; Alessio Foconi | |
Women
| Team Épée | Rossella Fiamingo; Mara Navarria; Giulia Rizzi; Alberta Santuccio | | |
| Team Foil | | Arianna Errigo; Martina Favaretto; Alice Volpi; Francesca Palumbo | |

== Multiple medalists ==
=== Olympic Games ===
The list refers to individual and team events and include men and women (in pink color), sorted by number of individual titles.

| # | Fencer | Individual | | | Team | | | Total | | |
| # | Fencer | Gold medal | Silver medal | Bronze medal | Gold medal | Silver medal | Bronze medal | Gold medal | Silver medal | Bronze medal |
|---|---|---|---|---|---|---|---|---|---|---|
| 1 | Valentina Vezzali | 3 | 1 | 1 | 3 | 0 | 1 | 6 | 1 | 2 |
| 2 | Nedo Nadi | 3 | 0 | 0 | 3 | 0 | 0 | 6 | 0 | 0 |
| 3 | Edoardo Mangiarotti | 1 | 1 | 2 | 5 | 4 | 0 | 6 | 5 | 2 |
| 4 | Giovanna Trillini | 1 | 1 | 2 | 3 | 0 | 1 | 4 | 1 | 3 |
| 5 | Giulio Gaudini | 1 | 1 | 2 | 2 | 3 | 0 | 3 | 4 | 2 |
| 6 | Giuseppe Delfino | 1 | 1 | 0 | 3 | 1 | 0 | 4 | 2 | 0 |
| 7 | Gustavo Marzi | 1 | 1 | 0 | 1 | 4 | 0 | 2 | 5 | 0 |

=== World Championships ===
The list refers to individual and team events and include men and women (in pink color), sorted by number of individual titles.

| # | Fencer | Individual | | | Team | | | Total | | |
| # | Fencer | Gold medal | Silver medal | Bronze medal | Gold medal | Silver medal | Bronze medal | Gold medal | Silver medal | Bronze medal |
|---|---|---|---|---|---|---|---|---|---|---|
| 1 | Valentina Vezzali | 6 | 2 | 4 | 10 | 5 | 0 | 16 | 7 | 4 |
| 2 | Edoardo Mangiarotti | 2 | 5 | 2 | 11 | 3 | 3 | 13 | 8 | 5 |
| 3 | Giovanna Trillini | 2 | 2 | 4 | 7 | 3 | 1 | 9 | 5 | 5 |
| 4 | Salvatore Sanzo | 2 | 0 | 1 | 2 | 1 | 2 | 4 | 1 | 3 |
| 5 | Aldo Montano, Sr. | 2 | 0 | 0 | 3 | 1 | 0 | 5 | 1 | 0 |
| 6 | Mario Aldo Montano | 2 | 0 | 0 | 0 | 1 | 4 | 2 | 1 | 4 |
| 7 | Manlio Di Rosa | 1 | 1 | 1 | 5 | 3 | 0 | 6 | 4 | 1 |
| 8 | Renzo Nostini | 1 | 1 | 0 | 6 | 6 | 1 | 7 | 7 | 1 |
| 9 | Carlo Pavesi | 0 | 2 | 1 | 6 | 1 | 0 | 6 | 3 | 1 |

== See also ==
- Italian Fencing Federation
- Italy at the Olympics
- Fencing Olympics medal table
- World Championships medal table
- European Championships medal table
- Junior World Fencing Championships
- Fencing World Cup
- Fencing at the Mediterranean Games
- History of fencing
- Fencing schools
- Italian school of swordsmanship
