= Claiborne Walker =

American fencer and Naval Lieutenant (1899 – 1927)

Lieutenant Claiborne Walker
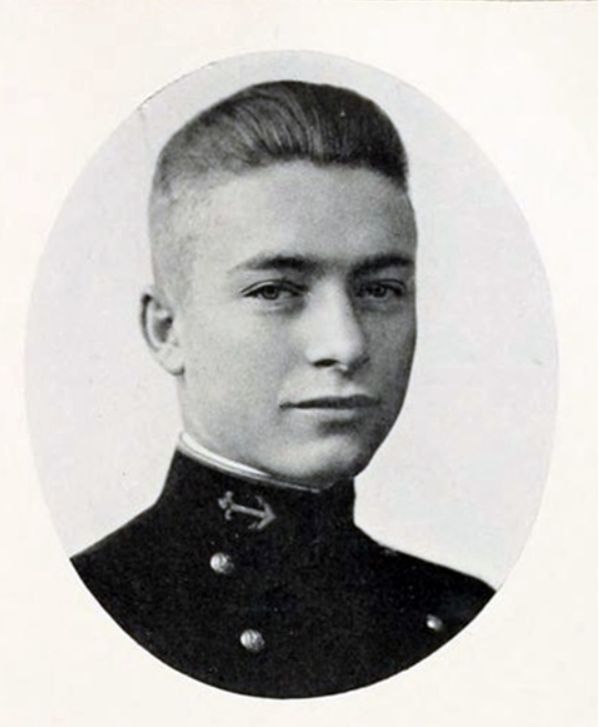
- Graduation photo from the U.S. Naval Academy Yearbook, 1921

Personal information
- Full name: Claiborne Jay Walker
- National team: United States
- Born: September 21, 1899
- Died: April 26, 1927 (aged 27) Shanghai, China
- Resting place: Mountain View Cemetery, Walla Walla, Washington; 46.04440, -118.32670
- Education: United States Naval Academy
- Employer: United States Navy
- Other interests: Rifle shooting

Sport
- Sport: Fencing
- Event: Sabre
- University team: United States Naval Academy

Achievements and titles
- Olympic finals: 1920 Summer Olympics

Claiborne Jay Walker (September 21, 1899 – April 26, 1927) was an American fencer and naval Lieutenant. Walker competed in the individual and team sabre events at the 1920 Summer Olympics. Walker entered the United States Naval Academy in 1917 where he received various awards as a fencer. Walker died aged 27 of a gunshot wound while serving overseas in Shanghai, China.

== Biography ==
Walker was reportedly born in Oregon, and grew up in Walla Walla, Washington.

== 1920 Olympics ==
Walker was selected to compete for the United States in Fencing at the 1920 Summer Olympics after distinguishing himself in the sport during his time at the United States Naval Academy. While at the academy, he was part of the team from Annapolis that won the intercollegiate fencing championships. After proceeding through three elimination meets, Walker joined teammates George Calnan (’20) alternate individual foil, Roscoe L Bowman (’21) individual and team sabre, Edwin G. Fullinwider (‘21) individual and team saber, and Frederick J. Cunningham (‘20) individual and team sabre who were also ensigns at the Naval Academy.

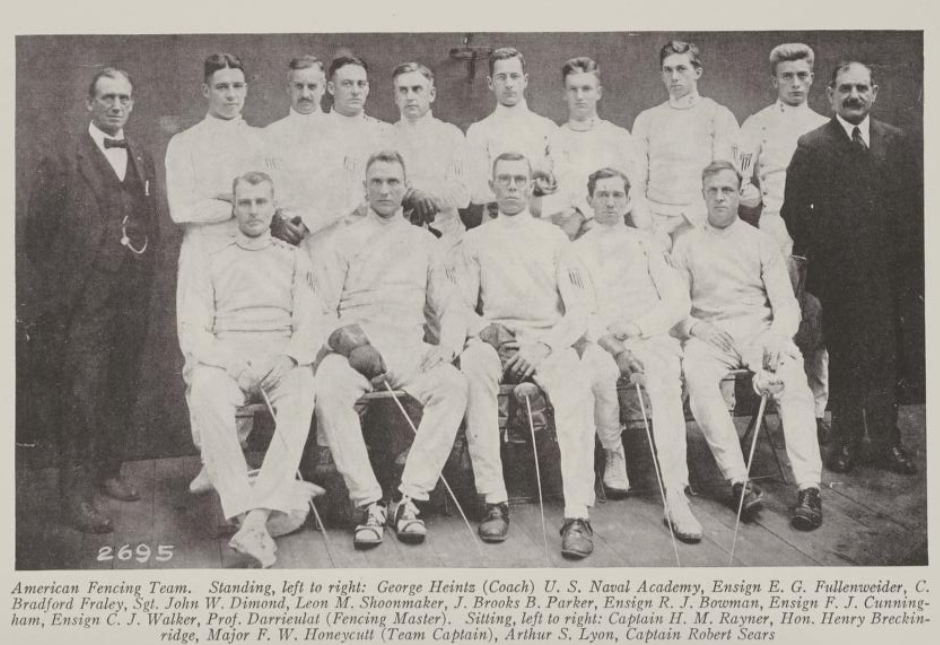

The US Olympic Fencing team sailed to Antwerp on the USS Frederick (ACR-8). They placed fencing mats and practiced on the quarterdeck for the duration of the journey, under the eye of sabre coach George Heintz Jr., who was also the fencing master at the Naval Academy.

At the Olympics in Antwerp, Walker competed in the individual and team sabre events. One of his winning preliminary bouts was against Nedo Nadi, who would go on to win the gold medal. A left handed fencer, Walker decisively defeated Nadi 3—0. In the quarterfinals, he won two bouts and lost four, and did not advance to the semifinals. The United States would go on to place fourth in the team sabre competition, the highest the U.S. had placed previously.

== Naval career ==
Walker was admitted to the United States Naval Academy in Annapolis on June 20, 1917, as a member of the Academy's class of 1920. Recognizable for his blonde hair, he was known as "C.J" or "Bright Eyes" among his peers. At the academy, he participated in both the fencing and rifle squad teams.

In 1918, he was listed as one of the midshipmen taking part in a practice cruise on the USS Missouri (BB-11) as part of the Third Class of the US Naval Academy. In 1919, he took part in his final practice cruise as a First Class midshipman serving on the USS North Dakota (BB-29). Later that year, he formally began duties on the battleship USS Wisconsin (BB-9) based in Philadelphia as a machinist.

On June 5, 1920, Walker was commissioned as an ensign in the United States Navy.

In 1920, the year of the Olympics, Walker was assigned to duty stations on the USS Reina Mercedes at the Naval Academy, and then to the Navy rifle team at Camp Perry. Later he was deployed to the Recruiting Station New York. He would formally graduate from the Naval Academy in the class of 1921.

On June 5, 1923, Walker advanced to the rank of Lieutenant (junior grade). That year, Walker went into service on the USS Tennessee (BB-43).

In 1924 and 1925, newly appointed Lieutenant Walker served duties on the USS Canopus (AS-9) and the destroyer USS McCormick as part of the Asiatic Fleet. In December 1926, Walker was nominated to rise to the rank of Lieutenant in the Navy, to come into effect on June 5, 1927.

=== Final tour of duty ===
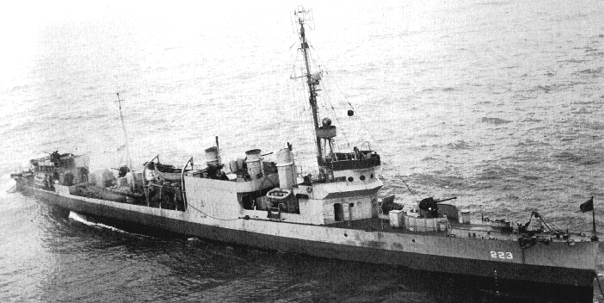
The USS McCormick where Walker served as Lieutenant (junior grade)

In April 1927, Walker was serving as Lieutenant (junior grade) aboard the destroyer USS McCormick on a tour of duty in Asia. Based in Cavite City, the USS McCormick and the Asiatic Fleet aimed to reduce tension in the East China Sea, as the region was on the cusp of the outbreak of the Chinese Civil War. On March 24, the Nanking incident sent greater numbers of U.S. and allied ships, including the USS McCormick, to join the Yangtze patrol in China to protect American business interests and U.S. citizens living abroad. Upon arrival, Chinese troops would indiscriminately fire on the foreign patrolling ships.

Anticipating the fall of Shanghai after the Nanking incident, foreign governments began evacuating their citizens from China. On April 12, the Shanghai massacre and the ensuing civil unrest led to the deaths of thousands in just a few days, in one of the most violent opening episodes of the Chinese Civil War. Over the next weeks, foreign flagged vessels would be shot at repeatedly in well orchestrated attacks.

=== Death ===
On April 26, at approximately 8:25pm local time, Lieutenant Walker "shot himself thru the head with a Colt automatic 45 caliber service pistol while lying on the bunk in his stateroom." First aid was administered by the ship's corpsman, and then by a doctor from USS Pittsburgh. He was taken about an hour later to Shanghai General Hospital; he died there at 10:00pm.

Walker's body was repatriated in early June 1927. Walker was later buried in Walla Walla's Mountain View Cemetery with full military honors.
