= Aldo Montano =

Aldo Montano may refer to:

- Aldo Montano (fencer born 1910), Italian fencer
- Aldo Montano (fencer born 1978), Italian fencer and grandson of the above fencer
- Mario Aldo Montano, Italian fencer and son of the fencer born in 1910
