= Rusconi =

Rusconi may refer to:

- Rusconi (band), Swiss jazz band
- Rusconi (surname), Italian surname

== See also ==
- Rusca (disambiguation)
