= Rusca =

Rusca may refer to:

== Places ==
=== Romania ===
- Rusca, a village in Teregova Commune, Caraş-Severin County
- Rusca, a village in Dorna-Arini Commune, Suceava County
- Rusca, a village in Pădureni Commune, Vaslui County
- Rusca Montană, a commune in Caraş-Severin County
- Rusca (Bistrița, left bank), a left bank tributary of the river Bistrița in Suceava County
- Rusca (Bistrița, right bank), a right bank tributary of the river Bistrița in Suceava County
- Rusca, a tributary of the Sucevița in Suceava County
- Rusca (Bistra), a right tributary of the river Bistra in Caraș-Severin County

=== Moldova ===
- Rusca, a village in Lăpușna Commune, Raionul Hîncești

== Ukraine ==
- Rusca, the Romanian name for Ruska village, Seliatyn, Chernivtsi Oblast, Ukraine

== People ==
- Claudia Rusca (1593–1676), Italian nun and musician
- Francesco Carlo Rusca (1693–1769), Swiss-Italian portrait painter
- Jean-Baptiste Dominique Rusca (1759–1814), French general of the Napoleonic period
- Nicolò Rusca (1563–1618), Italian priest beatified in 2013

== See also ==
- Rus (surname)
- Rusu (disambiguation)
- Ruseni (disambiguation)
- Rusești (disambiguation)
- Rusciori (disambiguation)
