= Rusconi (surname) =

Rusconi is an Italian surname, most common in northern Italy and Switzerland. Notable people with the surname include:

- Antonio Lamberto Rusconi (1743–1825), Italian Roman Catholic cardinal
- Benedetto Rusconi (c. 1460–1525), Italian painter
- Camillo Rusconi (1658–1728), Italian sculptor
- Frank Rusconi (1874–1964), Australian quarry owner and monumental mason
- Giovan Antonio Rusconi (c. 1500/1505–1578), Venetian architect
- Giovanni Rusconi (d. 1412), Italian Roman Catholic bishop
- Giulio Rusconi (1885–1968), Italian fencer
- Mauro Ruscóni (1776–1849), Italian physician and zoologist
- Paul Rusconi (born 1965), American contemporary artist
- Stefan Rusconi (born 1979), Swiss pianist and composer
- Stefano Rusconi (born 1968), Italian basketball player
