= Andrea Cipressa =

Italian fencer (born 1963)

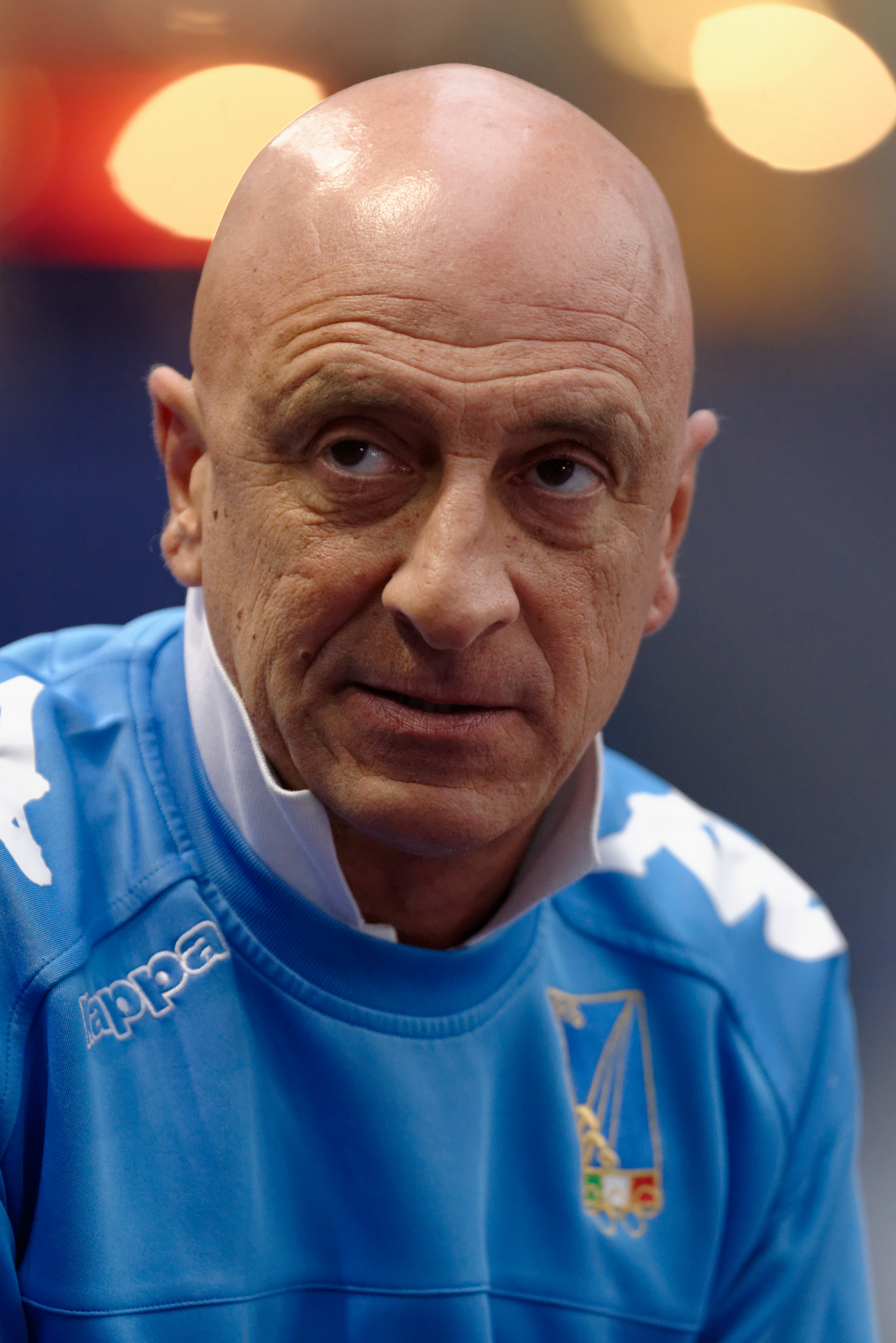
- Cipressa in 2015

Personal information
- Born: 14 December 1963 (age 62) Venice, Italy
- Height: 1.78 m (5 ft 10 in)

Fencing career
- Sport: Fencing
- Weapon: Foil
Medal record
Men's fencing
Representing Italy
Olympic Games
Gold medal – first place	1984 Los Angeles	Foil, team

Andrea Cipressa (born 14 December 1963) is an Italian fencer. He won a gold medal in the team foil event at the 1984 Summer Olympics. He is now a director of foil for the Italian Fencing Federation. His daughter, Erica Cipressa, is also a foil fencer. He is the Commissario tecnico of the Italy national fencing team.
