= Rusca (Bistrița, left bank) =

- Location within Romania

Location
- Country: Romania
- Counties: Suceava County

Physical characteristics
- Mouth: Bistrița
  - location: Rusca
  - coordinates: 47.3691°N 25.4525°E
- Length: 9 km (5.6 mi)
- Basin size: 16 km^{2} (6.2 sq mi)

Basin features
- Progression: Bistrița→ Siret→ Danube→ Black Sea
- River code: XII.1.53.20

The Rusca (also: Giumalău) is a left bank, south-flowing tributary of the river Bistrița in Romania. It flows into the Bistrița in the village Rusca. There is another Bistrița tributary named Rusca less than 200 metres downstream, on the opposite bank. Its length is 9 km (5.6 mi) and its basin size is 16 km^{2} (6.2 sq mi).
