= Rusciori =

Rusciori may refer to several places in Romania:

- Rusciori, a village in the town of Scornicești, Olt County
- Rusciori, a village in Șura Mică Commune, Sibiu County
- Rusciori (river), a tributary of the Cibin in Sibiu County

== See also ==
- Rus (surname)
- Rusu (disambiguation)
- Rusca (disambiguation)
- Ruseni (disambiguation)
- Rusești (disambiguation)
