= Nedo Nadi =

Italian fencer

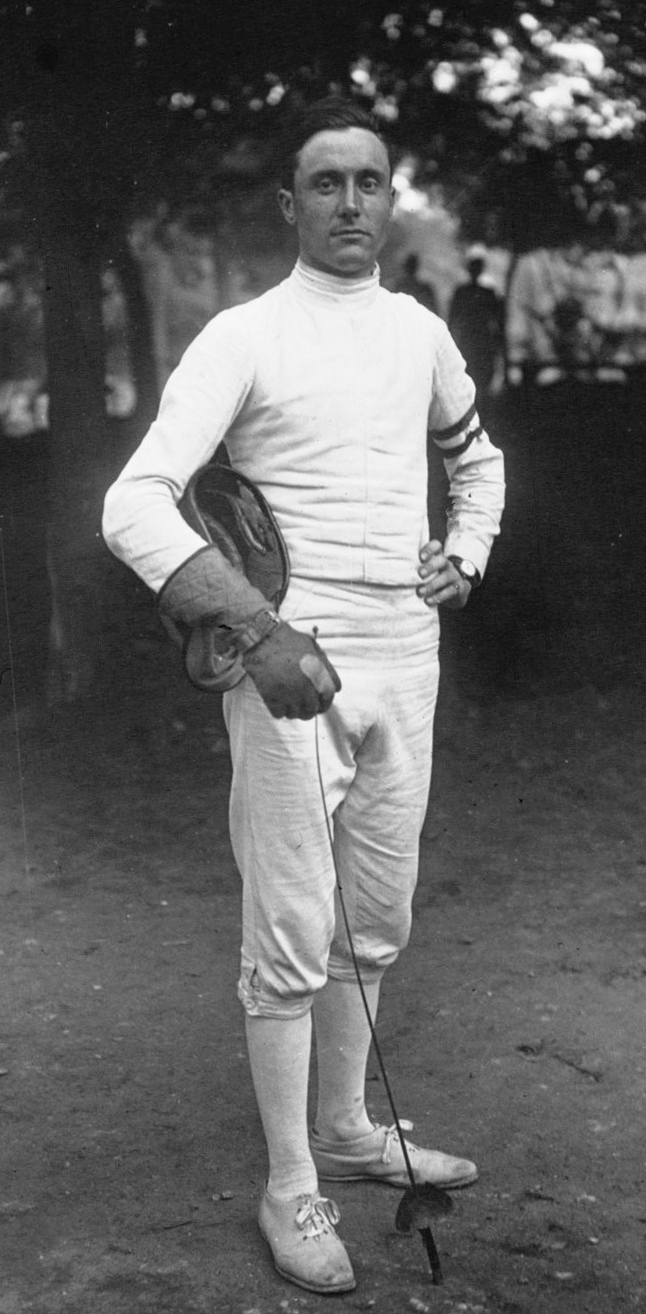
- Nedo Nadi in 1919

Personal information
- Born: 9 June 1894 Livorno, Tuscany, Italy
- Died: 29 January 1940 (aged 45) Portofino, Italy
- Height: 1.88 m (6 ft 2 in)

Sport
- Sport: Fencing
- Club: C. S. Fides, Livorno
Medal record
Men's fencing
Representing Italy
Olympic Games
Gold medal – first place	1912 Stockholm	Foil individual
Gold medal – first place	1920 Antwerp	Foil individual
Gold medal – first place	1920 Antwerp	Sabre individual
Gold medal – first place	1920 Antwerp	Foil team
Gold medal – first place	1920 Antwerp	Épée team
Gold medal – first place	1920 Antwerp	Sabre team

Nedo Nadi (9 June 1894 – 29 January 1940) was an Italian fencer. He is the only fencer to win a gold medal in each of the three weapons at a single Olympic Games and won the most fencing gold medals ever at a single Games—five. Nadi won six Olympic gold medals in total.

== Biography ==
=== Early life ===
Nedo Nadi was born in Livorno, Italy, the elder son of famous Italian fencing master, Giuseppe (Beppe) Nadi. He had a younger brother, Aldo who was an Olympic gold medallist in his own right. Nedo had his first fencing lesson with a foil at the age of seven in his father's gymnasium at Livorno. His father taught him foil and sabre but believed the épée to be an "undisciplined" weapon and refused to teach it. The brothers therefore used to go and practice by themselves and were essentially self-taught on épée. At the age of fourteen Nedo won a solid silver trophy for his three weapon work during the Jubilee celebration of Emperor Franz Joseph at Vienna.

=== 1912 Olympic Games ===
Competing for his country at 1912 Stockholm Olympics, Nadi became the youngest fencer to win a foil gold medal. Aged 18 years and 29 days, he beat teammate Pietro Speciale and Richard Verderber of Austria for the individual gold with seven straight victories in the final pool.

=== World War I ===
Nadi served in the Italian Army during World War I and was decorated for bravery.

=== 1920 Olympic Games ===
Nadi resumed his competitive career after World War I was over. Defeated central European countries and the Soviet Union did not attend the Antwerp games. This meant that Hungary, one of the strongest fencing nations, would be absent. Nadi therefore decided to expand his chances for gold and entered all three fencing disciplines in the team events, as well as the individual foil and sabre.

Nedo Nadi's 1920 Olympic performances were acclaimed as near to perfection as a fencer could execute. Nadi won the individual foil gold medal with a record 10 wins in the final pool.

Nadi's entry in the team épée event annoyed his father, who regarded the épée as "a crude and undisciplined weapon”. Unlike the foil, where a fencer could only score off a hit which landed on the trunk of the opponent's body, or the sabre where the upper torso and face mask count as scoring hits, in épée any part of the body is a legitimate hit. Nevertheless, Nedo Nadi led the Italian épée team, which included his brother Aldo, to the Olympic gold medal.

Nadi's perfect balance, timing and rapid reflexes were an advantage in any style of fencing, so without much difficulty he won the individual sabre gold medal by 11 victories to 9. His brother Aldo won the silver medal. In the team sabre event, the Italian team supported their star fencer and cruised to an easy victory.

Nadi, carried in triumph by his opponents, added three team victories to his tally of two individual golds and his younger brother Aldo won three team gold and one silver to make the family total a record for any sport in one Olympic Games.

=== Later life ===
After his Antwerp Olympic victories Nadi turned professional and took up coaching at the Buenos Aires Jockey Club. He returned to Rome some years later and was reinstated as an amateur. In 1932 he retired from actively fencing. From 1935 to his death in January 1940 he served as president of the Italian Fencing Federation. Italian Prime Minister Benito Mussolini called upon Nadi to coach the Italian fencing team to be entered in the 1936 Summer Olympics, a challenge Nadi accepted. His teams performed well, dominating the games, with Italian fencers sweeping gold, silver, and bronze in the individual épée competitions and easily claiming the team épée gold; collecting the individual gold and bronze and team gold in foil; and the individual and team silver medals in sabre. He died in 1940 in Portofino.

The Nadisee of Munich, a small bathing lake that was built in the Olympic Village for the 1972 Summer Olympics, is named after him.

== See also ==
- Legends of Italian sport - Walk of Fame
- List of multiple Olympic gold medalists at a single Games
- List of multiple Olympic gold medalists
- Italy national fencing team – Multiple medallist
- Nadisee

Summer Olympics
Preceded by Alberto Braglia	Flag bearer for Italy; 1920 Antwerp	Succeeded by Ugo Frigerio
