= Rusești =

Ruseşti may refer to several villages in Romania:

- Ruseşti, a village in Albac Commune, Alba County
- Ruseşti, a village in Bulzeștii de Sus Commune, Hunedoara County
- Ruseştii Noi, a commune in Ialoveni district, Moldova

== See also ==
- Rus (surname)
- Rusu (disambiguation)
- Rusca (disambiguation)
- Ruseni (disambiguation)
- Rusciori (disambiguation)
