= Rus (surname) =

Rus is a Romanian, Slovene, Dutch, and Spanish/Catalan surname. Notable people with the surname include:

- Arantxa Rus (born 1990), Dutch professional tennis player residing in Spain
- Alfonso Rus (born 1950), Spanish politician
- Daniela L. Rus, Romanian-born, working in US as a roboticist
- Ioan Rus (born 1955), Romanian politician
- Iosif Rus, Romanian general and politician, chief of Securitate
- Laura Rus (born 1987), Romanian footballer
- Laurențiu Rus (born 1985), Romanian footballer
- Maria Rus (born 1983), Romanian sprinter
- Miloš Rus (born 1962), Slovenian footballer
- Mircea Rus (born 1978), Romanian football player
- Pepa Rus (born 1985), Spanish actress
- Teodor Rus (born 1974), Romanian football player
- Veljko Rus (1929–2018), Slovenian sociologist
- Viorel Rus (born 1952), Romanian water polo player

== See also ==
- Ríos (disambiguation)
- Rusu (disambiguation)
- Rusca (disambiguation)
- Ruseni (disambiguation)
- Rusești (disambiguation)
- Rusciori (disambiguation)
