= Rusu =

Rusu or RUSU may refer to:

== People ==
- Rusu clan in Japan
- Rusu Masakage, Japanese samurai
- Rusu (surname)

== Places ==
- Rusu River, tributary of Valea lui Manole River in Romania
- Pârâul Stâna lui Rusu, tributary of the Pârâul Bradului in Romania
- Rusu de Jos, town in Bistriţa-Năsăud County, Romania
- Rusu de Sus, commune in Bistriţa-Năsăud County, Romania

== Organizations ==
- RUSU, acronym for Reading University Students' Union
- RUSU, acronym for RMIT University Student Union

== See also ==
- Rus (surname)
- Rusca (disambiguation)
- Ruseni (disambiguation)
- Rusești (disambiguation)
- Rusciori (disambiguation)
