= Rusca (Bistrița, right bank) =

- Location within Romania

Location
- Country: Romania
- Counties: Suceava County

Physical characteristics
- Mouth: Bistrița
  - location: Rusca
  - coordinates: 47.3688°N 25.4547°E

Basin features
- Progression: Bistrița→ Siret→ Danube→ Black Sea
- River code: XII.1.53.21

The Rusca is a right bank, north-flowing tributary of the river Bistrița in Romania. It flows into the Bistrița in the village Rusca. There is another Bistrița tributary named Rusca less than 200 metres upstream, on the opposite bank. Its length is 12 km (7.5 mi) and its basin size is 11 km^{2} (4.2 sq mi).
