= Ruseni =

Ruseni or Ruşeni may refer to the following places:

== Romania ==
- Ruseni, a village in Borlești Commune, Neamţ County
- Ruseni, a village in Poiana Teiului Commune, Neamţ County
- Ruşeni, a village in Păulești, Satu Mare Commune, Satu Mare County
- Rusenii Noi and Rusenii Vechi, villages in Holboca Commune, Iaşi County

== Moldova ==
- Ruseni, a village administered by Anenii Noi city, Anenii Noi District
- Ruseni, Edineţ, a commune in Edineţ District

== See also ==
- Rus (surname)
- Rusu (disambiguation)
- Rusca (disambiguation)
- Rusești (disambiguation)
- Rusciori (disambiguation)
