= 1983 European Fencing Championships =

The 1983 European Fencing Championships were held in Lisbon, Portugal. The competition consisted of exclusively individual events.

== Medal summary ==
=== Men's events ===
Event	Gold	Silver	Bronze
Foil	Andrea Borella (ITA)	Klaus Reichert (FRG)	Angelo Scuri (ITA)
Épée	Alexander Pusch (FRG)	Angelo Mazzoni (ITA)	Leszek Swornowski (POL)
Sabre	Giovanni Scalzo (ITA)	Marin Ivanov (BUL)	Georgi Chomakov (BUL)

=== Women's events ===
Event	Gold	Silver	Bronze
Foil	Cornelia Hanisch (FRG)	Carola Cicconetti (ITA)	Linda Ann Martin (GBR)

=== Medal table ===
Rank	Nation	Gold	Silver	Bronze	Total
1	Italy (ITA)	2	2	1	5
2	West Germany (FRG)	2	1	0	3
3	Bulgaria (BUL)	0	1	1	2
4	Great Britain (GBR)	0	0	1	1
4	Poland (POL)	0	0	1	1
Totals (5 entries)		4	4	4	12
