= Marcel Servent =

French fencer

Personal information
- Full name: Marcel Antoine Joseph Servent
- Born: 29 May 1877 Montpellier, France
- Died: 3 August 1962 (aged 85) Marseille, France

Sport
- Sport: Fencing

Marcel Antoine Joseph Servent (29 May 1877 – 3 August 1962) was a French fencer. He competed in the individual sabre event at the 1920 Summer Olympics.
