= Bradford Fraley =

American fencer

Charles Sidney Bradford Fraley
Personal information
- Born: September 8, 1878 Philadelphia, Pennsylvania, United States
- Died: January 14, 1942 (aged 63) Chestnut Hill, Pennsylvania, United States

Sport
- Sport: Fencing

Charles Sidney Bradford Fraley (September 8, 1878 – January 14, 1942) was an American fencer. He competed in the team sabre event at the 1920 Summer Olympics. He committed suicide by shooting himself in 1942.
