= USS McCormick =

Clemson-class destroyer

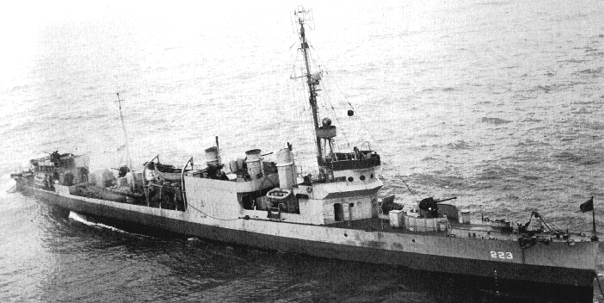
- USS McCormick (DD-223)

History

United States
- Namesake: Alexander McCormick, Jr.
- Builder: William Cramp & Sons, Philadelphia
- Yard number: 489
- Laid down: 11 August 1919
- Launched: 14 February 1920
- Commissioned: 30 August 1920
- Decommissioned: 14 October 1938
- Recommissioned: 26 September 1939
- Reclassified: Miscellaneous auxiliary, AG-118, 30 June 1945
- Decommissioned: 4 October 1945
- Stricken: 24 October 1945
- Fate: Sold for scrap 15 December 1946

General characteristics
- Class & type: Clemson-class destroyer
- Displacement: 1,190 tons
- Length: 314 feet 5 inches (95.83 m)
- Beam: 31 feet 9 inches (9.68 m)
- Draft: 9 feet 3 inches (2.82 m)
- Propulsion: 26,500 shp (20 MW); geared turbines, 2 screws
- Speed: 35 knots (65 km/h)
- Complement: 101 officers and enlisted
- Armament: 4 x 4 in (100 mm) guns, 1 x 3 in (76 mm) gun, 12 x 21 inch (533 mm) tt.

USS McCormick (DD-223/AG-118) was a Clemson-class destroyer in the United States Navy during World War II. She was named for Lieutenant, junior grade Alexander McCormick Jr.

== Construction and commissioning ==
McCormick was laid down 11 August 1919 by William Cramp & Sons; launched 14 February 1920; sponsored by Miss Katherine McCormick, sister of Lieutenant (jg.) McCormick; and commissioned 30 August 1920.

== Service history ==
Following shakedown, McCormick served a year with Destroyer Squadron 5, Pacific Fleet. She then returned to the United States East Coast for deployment with Destroyer Detachment, U. S. Naval Forces in European Waters. There she served in a quasi-diplomatic capacity in the eastern Mediterranean until the spring of 1924, after successful negotiations for a peace treaty between the Allies and Turkey.

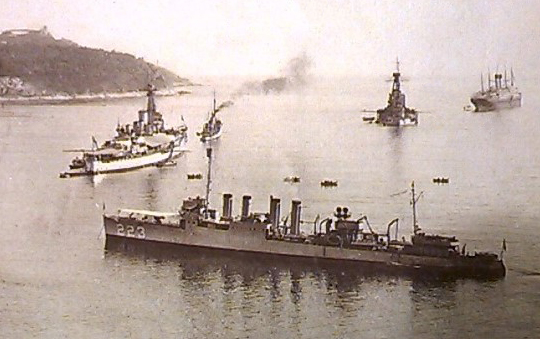
Destroyer USS McCormick at anchor in the Bay of Villefranche, France, 1923 or 1924.

The following year, she was assigned to the Asiatic Fleet. Operating from Cavite, she served as flagship for DesDiv 39, later 14, in support of the Yangtze River Patrol and South China Patrol until 1932. On 15 March she was ordered back to the United States and home ported at San Diego, where she decommissioned 14 October 1938.

=== World War II ===
The following year, as hostilities in Europe broke out; McCormick was brought out of the Inactive Reserve. Recommissioned 26 September 1939, she was assigned to Neutrality Patrol in the Atlantic. The entry of the U.S. into the worldwide conflict brought only an increase in antisubmarine activities for the destroyer as she continued her voyages to Iceland and across the Atlantic.

Through the end of 1942, McCormick plied the North Atlantic on runs to Halifax, NS Argentia, and Londonderry Port. Shifting southward, 7 February 1943, she escorted convoys bound for Casablanca. On 12 July, on a return voyage, Santee, providing air cover for the convoy, was relieved by Core. But before Santee departed the area, four U-boats were discovered in the convoy's vicinity. For the next 4 days, planes from the carriers scouted and destroyed all four: Santee, Hovey U-160 on the 14th and U-509 on the 15th; Core, U-487 on the 13th and U-67 on the 16th. On the last date, McCormick picked up three survivors from U-67 for later transferral.

McCormick returned to New York 24 July and continued to escort convoys until 5 December. She then joined Croatan, TG 27.4, for a quick voyage to Casablanca and back, before overhaul at New York.

The destroyer's next assignment sent her to Natal, Brazil, and then Casablanca, escorting Albemarle. On 1 April 1944, she was ordered to Boston, Massachusetts to resume escort and antisubmarine patrol duties. In May, McCormick returned to transatlantic convoy duty with a run to North Africa. During the next 4 months, she touched at various ports, including Bizerte, Oran, Cherbourg, Falmouth, Belfast, and Milford Haven. Upon her return to Boston, 1 October, she spent 3 months in convoy and patrol operations off the U.S. East Coast and in the Caribbean before shifting back to the Casablanca run in January 1945.

== Convoys escorted ==
Convoy	Escort Group	Dates	Notes
HX 158		5-13 Nov 1941	from Newfoundland to Iceland prior to US declaration of war
ON 37		22-30 Nov 1941	from Iceland to Newfoundland prior to US declaration of war
HX 165		17-24 Dec 1941	from Newfoundland to Iceland
ON 51		2-11 Jan 1942	from Iceland to Newfoundland
HX 172		28 Jan-4 Feb 1942	from Newfoundland to Iceland
ON 65		12-19 Feb 1942	from Iceland to Newfoundland
HX 183	MOEF group A1	6-14 April 1942	from Newfoundland to Northern Ireland
ON 89	MOEF group A1	24-26 April 1942	from Northern Ireland to Newfoundland

== Auxiliary service ==
On 31 March, McCormick departed Norfolk for temporary duty with SubRon 3 at Balboa, Panama Canal Zone. On 30 June 1945, she was reclassified miscellaneous auxiliary, AG-118, while at the Canal Zone. Two weeks later, she got underway for overhaul at Boston, arriving 21 July. Still undergoing repairs when peace came, McCormick decommissioned 4 October 1945. Her name was struck from the Navy list 24 October 1945 and her hulk was sold for scrapping to Boston Metals Company, Baltimore, Maryland, 15 December 1946.

As of 2005, no other U.S. Navy ship has been named McCormick. The USS Lynde McCormick DDG(8), a Charles F. Adams-Class destroyer was commissioned 3 June 1961. It was named after Admiral Lynde D. McCormick.
