= Paul Rusconi =

American contemporary artist (born 1965)

- Born: Paul Rusconi; 1965 (age 60–61); California
- Known for: Painting

Paul Rusconi (born 1965, in California) is an American contemporary artist who began as a post-war and contemporary art dealer based in Los Angeles.

== Life and work ==
Rusconi was born in California. He studied at Pepperdine University and is now a contemporary artist living and working in Los Angeles.

Rusconi investigates the portrait with his own photo-based images as well as found or sourced images from popular culture. His work is a digital screening process often combined with nail polish, oil paint, engine enamel and monochromatic photography. The work is layered and framed. The shadow image on the monochromatic photographic is a simple projection through the Plexiglas. There is no image on the actual photograph until one is projected on it by the digital screen. His own photography is used for images that create a grey scale from blue, magenta, yellow and black. Up close all that is evident are colorful dots – and from about 12 feet away – those dots turn into a grey scale or what looks to be a black-and-white image. This notion came from the observation that a grey-scale could be created from color and therefore such a grey-scale could be broken down into color. The subjects have included artists, musicians, politicians and currently with his fascination of pop-culture and its huge and wide-reaching skate sub-culture Rusconi focuses his current group of portraits on today's 14 most influential skateboarders in the world.

Untitled (No Way Out) features an image of Tom Cruise and wife Katie Holmes from a magazine cover. The solid background reflects the shadow of the silkscreen. Untitled (Tyra) is a contemporary glamour portrait featuring a vignette of model Tyra Banks.

Works by Rusconi are included in the collections of numerous private homes and public art institutions, including The Frederick R. Weisman Art Foundation, the Interface Foundation, the Castilla Foundation, Madrid and the Carnegie Art Museum, Photos and Phantasy: Selections from the Frederick R. Weisman Art Foundation, March 8, 2008 – May 18, 2008.

On June 17, 2011, Rusconi was arrested on suspicion of committing lewd acts on his 20-month-old twin daughters and using them to create child pornography. The children's nanny and her husband made the allegations after seeing photos that Rusconi had taken of himself with his daughters in a bathtub. On May 11, 2012, Rusconi was cleared of all charges. He filed suit against his accusers who he believed targeted him because he is a gay single father.
