= Stefan Rusconi =

Swiss pianist

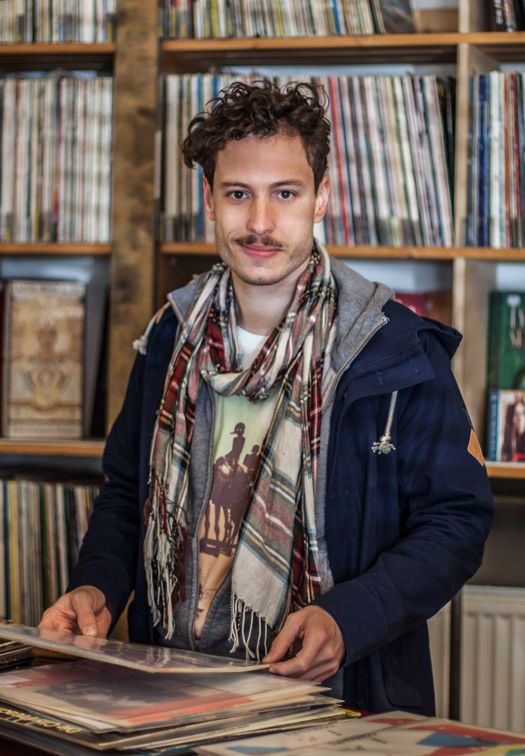
- Rusconi in 2012

Background information
- Born: 14 February 1979 (age 47)
- Origin: Zurich, Switzerland
- Genres: Avant-garde, jazz
- Years active: 2001–present
- Labels: Sony, Qilin, Bee Jazz, Unit
- Formerly of: Rusconi
- Website: stefanrusconi.com

Stefan Rusconi (born 14 February 1979) is a Swiss pianist and composer.

== Work ==
Since 2004, along with Fabian Gisler (bass) and Claudio Strüby (drums), Rusconi is playing with his band Rusconi across the world. So far, they release six records on indie and major labels such as Bee Jazz Records and Sony Music Entertainment. Since 2012, they are running their own boutique label Qilin Records on which they release their music and the music of other musician friends.

In 2011, Rusconi composed the music for the film documentary Tinguely directed by Thomas Thümena. Also in 2011, together with pianist und producer Ephrem Lüchinger, Rusconi founded the experimental electronica duo Whistler & Hustler, which released the album The Whistler & Hustler Session via Qilin Records in 2013.

Rusconi wrote the music for the stage play Kinder der Sonne by Maxim Gorki, which premiered 2015 at the opera Basel. Also in 2015, along with Paul Lemp (bass) and Marc Lohr (drums), he composed the music for Until our Hearts Stop directed by American choreographer Meg Stuart, which was coproduced by Münchner Kammerspiele and the Ruhrtriennale. The production in which he plays electronics, trumpet and piano has been touring Europe.

Rusconi has collaborated with Fred Frith, Thomas Wydler, Pipilotti Rist, Norma Winstone, Tobias Preisig, Dieter Meier, the ARTE Quartett, and Till Brönner.

== Discography ==
- Rusconi: Stop & Go, Unit Records/Sony Music Entertainment; 2006
- Rusconi: It's a Sonic Life, CD Sony Music Entertainment, 2010; LP Qilin Records; 2013
- Rusconi: Revolution, LP Qilin Records 2012; CD Bee Jazz; 2012
- Rusconi: History Sugar Dream, LP/CD Qilin Records; 2014
- Whistler & Hustler: The Whistler & Hustler Session; Qilin Records, limited key edition; 2013

== Awards ==
- Cultural grant from the city of Zurich 2013
- Pro Helvetia "High Priority Jazz Promotion" between 2010 and 2012
- Echo Jazz as best pianist (Germany), 2011
