= Aldo Montano (fencer born 1978) =

Italian fencer

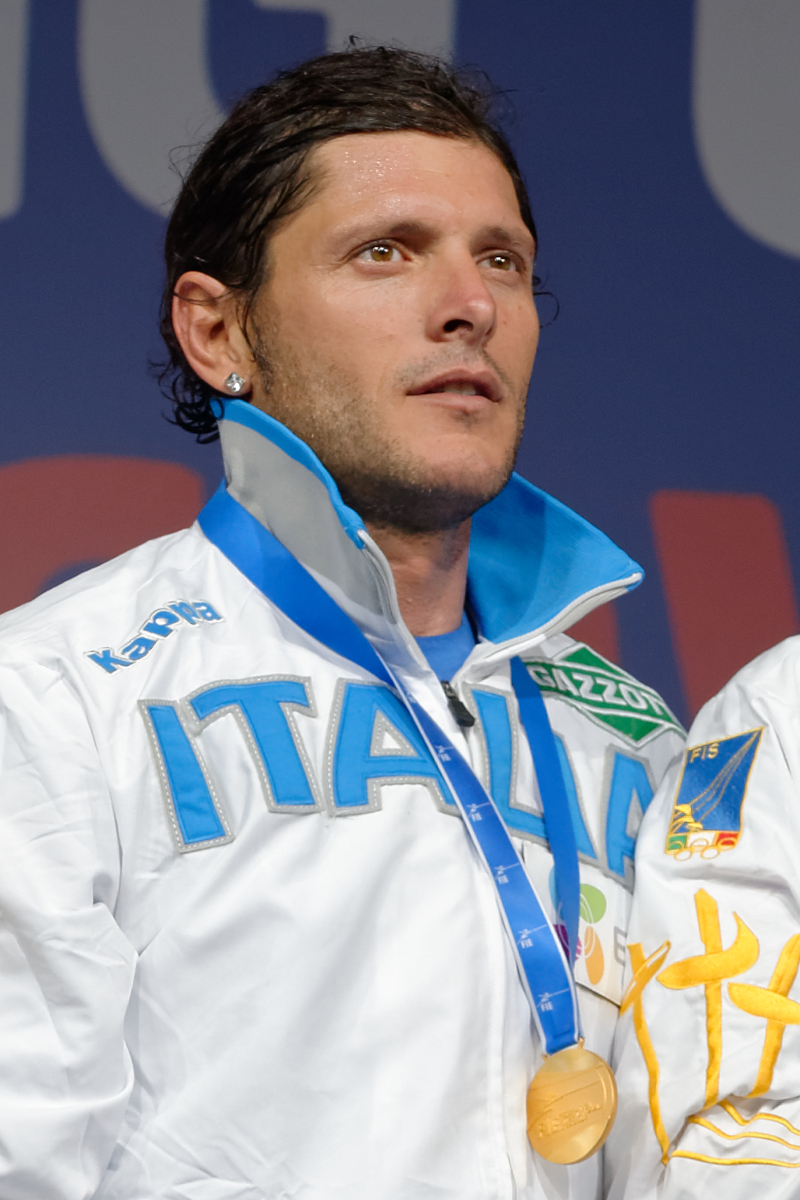
- Montano in 2015

Personal information
- Born: 18 November 1978 (age 47) Livorno, Italy
- Height: 1.84 m (6 ft 0 in)
- Weight: 82 kg (181 lb)

Fencing career
- Sport: Fencing
- Country: Italy
- Weapon: Sabre
- Hand: right-handed
- National coach: Giovanni Sirovich
- Club: G.S. Fiamme Azzurre
- Head coach: Andrea Terenzio
- FIE ranking: current ranking
Medal record
Men's fencing
Representing Italy
Olympic Games
Gold medal – first place	2004 Athens	Individual sabre
Silver medal – second place	2004 Athens	Team sabre
Silver medal – second place	2020 Tokyo	Team sabre
Bronze medal – third place	2008 Beijing	Team sabre
Bronze medal – third place	2012 London	Team sabre
World Championships
Gold medal – first place	2011 Catania	Individual sabre
Gold medal – first place	2015 Moscow	Team sabre
Silver medal – second place	2002 Lisbon	Team sabre
Silver medal – second place	2005 Leipzig	Team sabre
Silver medal – second place	2007 St Petersburg	Individual sabre
Silver medal – second place	2009 Antalya	Team sabre
Silver medal – second place	2010 Paris	Team sabre
Silver medal – second place	2018 Wuxi	Team sabre
Bronze medal – third place	2003 Havana	Individual sabre
Bronze medal – third place	2007 St Petersburg	Team sabre
Bronze medal – third place	2011 Catania	Team sabre
Bronze medal – third place	2019 Budapest	Team sabre
European Championships
Gold medal – first place	2005 Zalaegerszeg	Individual sabre
Gold medal – first place	2009 Plovdiv	Team sabre
Gold medal – first place	2010 Leipzig	Team sabre
Gold medal – first place	2011 Sheffield	Team sabre
Gold medal – first place	2013 Zagreb	Team sabre
Silver medal – second place	2002 Moskov	Team sabre
Silver medal – second place	2003 Bourges	Team sabre
Silver medal – second place	2015 Montreaux	Team sabre
Silver medal – second place	2017 Tbilisi	Team sabre
Silver medal – second place	2018 Novi Sad	Team sabre
Bronze medal – third place	2019 Düsseldorf	Team sabre
Mediterranean Games
Gold medal – first place	2005 Almería	Individual sabre

Aldo Montano III (born 18 November 1978) is an Italian fencer and a five-time Olympic medalist.

He received a gold medal in sabre individual at the 2004 Summer Olympics in Athens. On 11 October 2011, he won the gold medal at the World Championships in Catania, Italy. He won a silver medal in Men's team sabre at the 2020 Summer Olympics.

== Biography ==
Montano is the third generation of his family to win a fencing medal for Italy at the Olympic Games. He initially took up foil, but switched to sabre so he could follow in the footsteps of his grandfather and father. His grandfather, Aldo Montano, won silver medals on the team event in sabre at the 1936 Summer Olympics and the 1948 Summer Olympics. Aldo's father, Mario Aldo Montano, was part of the Italian sabre team that won the gold medal at the 1972 Summer Olympics, and the team silver medals for sabre at the 1976 Summer Olympics, and again at the 1980 Summer Olympics. His uncles (Mario Tullio Montano and Tommaso Montano) were also on the same team as his father (at both the 1972 and 1976 Olympic events). Another uncle, Carlo Montano, won silver in team foil in 1976.

Since 2015 he was in a relationship with the Russian track and field athlete Olga Plachina, born in 1996. They got married in 2016 and as of December 2016 are expecting their first child, a girl, who they want to name Olimpia.

== Achievements ==
Montano is one of the most successful Italian sabre fencers of all time, surpassing the success of his father and grandfather as fencers. He has five Olympic medals, one gold for the individual event in 2004 Summer Olympics, 2 silver medals for the team event in 2004 Summer Olympics and 2020 Summer Olympics and 2 bronze medals for the team events in 2008 Summer Olympics and 2012 Summer Olympics.

The gold medal bout in 2004 was a "thrilling" final against Hungary's Zsolt Nemcsik, with a final score of 15–14. Nemcsik established an early lead of 5–1, while Montano struggled with a leg cramp. The score remained close during the entire bout, with many close calls, but the final touch by Aldo demonstrated his strength on offense with a powerful redoublement attack.

Aldo Montano has also been very successful at the World Championships, having one gold medal, five silver medals and three bronze medals for individual and team events. He also has seven European Championships medals, five of them gold, as well as a gold medal from the 2005 Mediterranean Games.

== Tribute ==
The five circles will accompany you endlessly, together with the victories that have illuminated your fantastic career. You have increased the fame of a dynasty that has made Italian sport great. Proud to have given you the ovation you deserve. Thanks for everything, Aldo Montano

— The president of the CONI Giovanni Malagò, 29 July 2021
