= Henri de Saint Germain =

French fencer (1878–1951)

Personal information
- Born: 30 June 1878 Saint-Malo, France
- Died: 19 December 1951 (aged 73)

Sport
- Sport: Fencing
Medal record
Men's fencing
Representing France
Olympic Games
Silver medal – second place	1920 Antwerp	Sabre, team

Henri de Saint Germain (30 June 1878 – 19 December 1951) was a French fencer. He won a silver medal in the team sabre competition at the 1920 Summer Olympics.
