= Jean Margraff =

French fencer

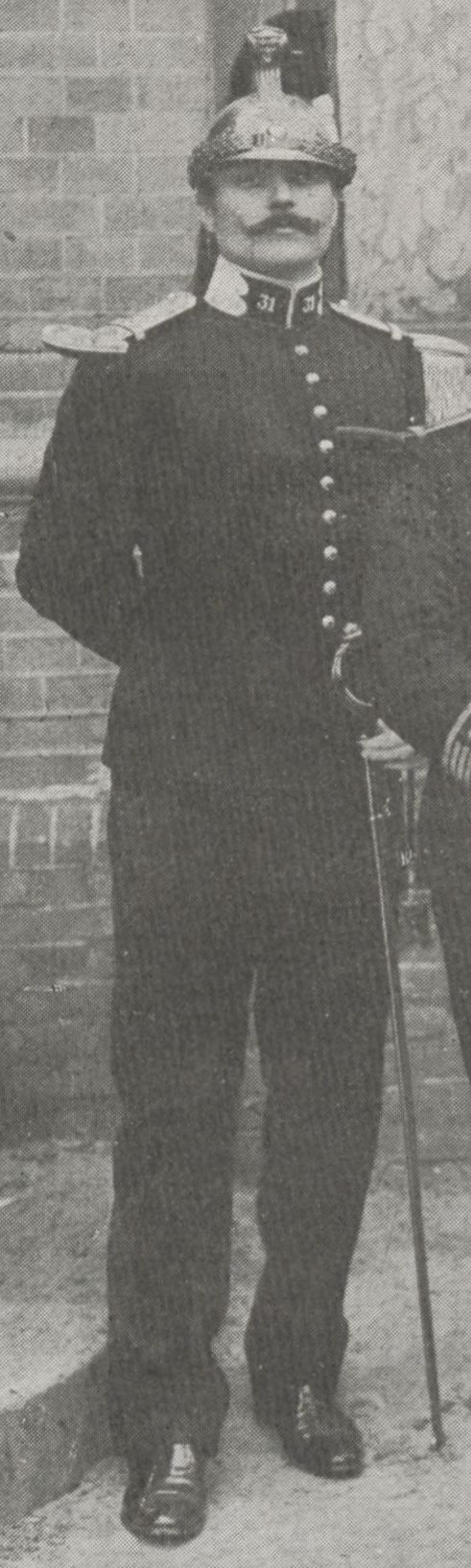

Personal information
- Born: 17 February 1876 Graçay, France
- Died: 11 February 1959 (aged 82) Lunéville, France
- Height: 172 cm (5 ft 8 in)

Sport
- Sport: Fencing
Medal record
Men's fencing
Representing France
Olympic Games
Silver medal – second place	1920 Antwerp	Sabre, team

Jean Alphonse Margraff (17 February 1876 – 11 February 1959) was a French fencer. He won a silver medal in the team sabre event at the 1920 Summer Olympics.
