= Erica Cipressa =

Italian fencer (born 1996)

Personal information
- Born: 18 May 1996 (age 30) Mirano, Italy

Sport
- Country: Italy
- Sport: Fencing
- Club: Fiamme Oro
Medal record
Olympic Games
Bronze medal – third place	2020 Tokyo	Foil team
Universiade
Gold medal – first place	2019 Naples	Foil individual
Gold medal – first place	2019 Naples	Foil team

Erica Cipressa (born 18 May 1996) is an Italian right-handed foil fencer and 2021 team Olympic bronze medalist.

She won two gold medals at the 2019 Summer Universiade.

== Biography ==
She is the daughter of the former Olympic champion Andrea Cipressa.

== Medal Record ==
=== Olympic Games ===
Year	Location	Event	Position
2021	Tokyo, Japan	Team Women's Foil	3rd

=== World Cup ===
Date	Location	Event	Position
2019-05-03	Tauberbischofsheim, Germany	Individual Women's Foil	3rd
2018-02-02	Algier, Algeria	Individual Women's Foil	2nd
2022-04-29	Tauberbischofsheim, Germany	Individual Women's Foil	3rd

== See also ==
- Italy at the 2019 Summer Universiade
