= Eric Startin =

British fencer

Personal information
- Born: 11 June 1882 Putney, England
- Died: 1955 (aged 72–73) Croydon, England

Sport
- Sport: Fencing

Eric Charles Startin (11 June 1882 – 1955) was a British fencer. He competed in the individual sabre event at the 1920 Summer Olympics.
