= Aldo Montano (fencer born 1910) =

Italian fencer

Personal information
- Born: 23 November 1910 Livorno, Kingdom of Italy
- Died: 2 September 1996 (aged 85) Livorno, Italy

Sport
- Sport: Fencing
Medal record
Men's fencing
Representing Italy
Olympic Games
| Silver medal – second place | 1936 Berlin | Sabre, team |
| Silver medal – second place | 1948 London | Sabre, team |

Aldo Montano (23 November 1910 – 2 September 1996) was an Italian fencer. He won a silver medal in the team sabre event at the 1936 and 1948 Summer Olympics. His son, Mario Aldo Montano, and grandson Aldo Montano, also competed at the Olympic Games for Italy as fencers.

== See also ==
- Italy national fencing team - Multiple medallist
