= Marc Perrodon =

French fencer (1878–1939)

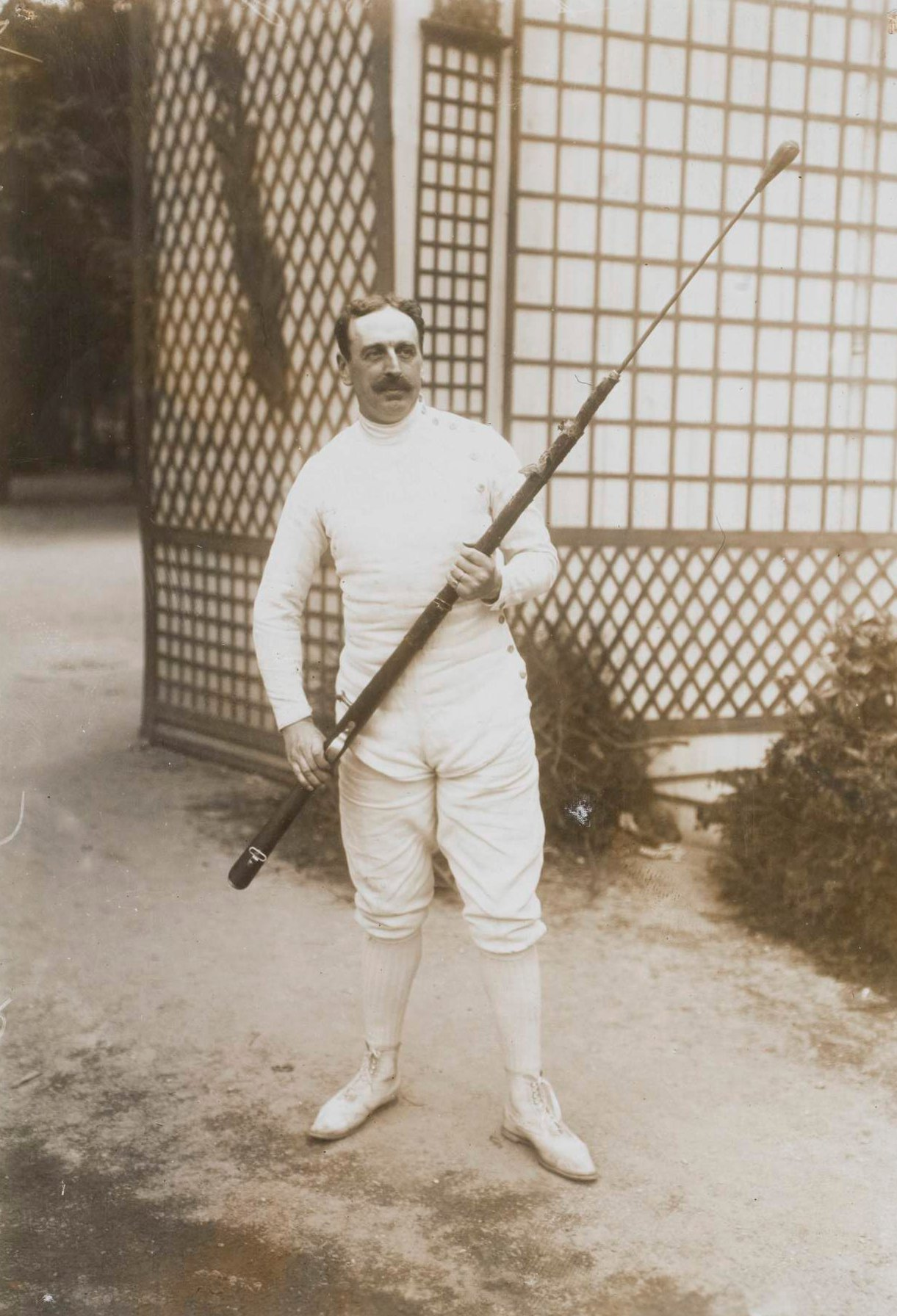

Personal information
- Born: 31 August 1878 Vendôme, France
- Died: 22 February 1939 (aged 60)

Sport
- Sport: Fencing
Medal record
Men's fencing
Representing France
Olympic Games
| Silver medal – second place | 1920 Antwerp | Sabre, team |

Marc Perrodon (31 August 1878 – 22 February 1939) was a French fencer. He won a silver medal in the team sabre competition at the 1920 Summer Olympics. A 1924 Pathé-Revue newsreel shows him in action. He is described as a champion French sabre fencer.
