= Rusconi (band) =

Swiss jazz band

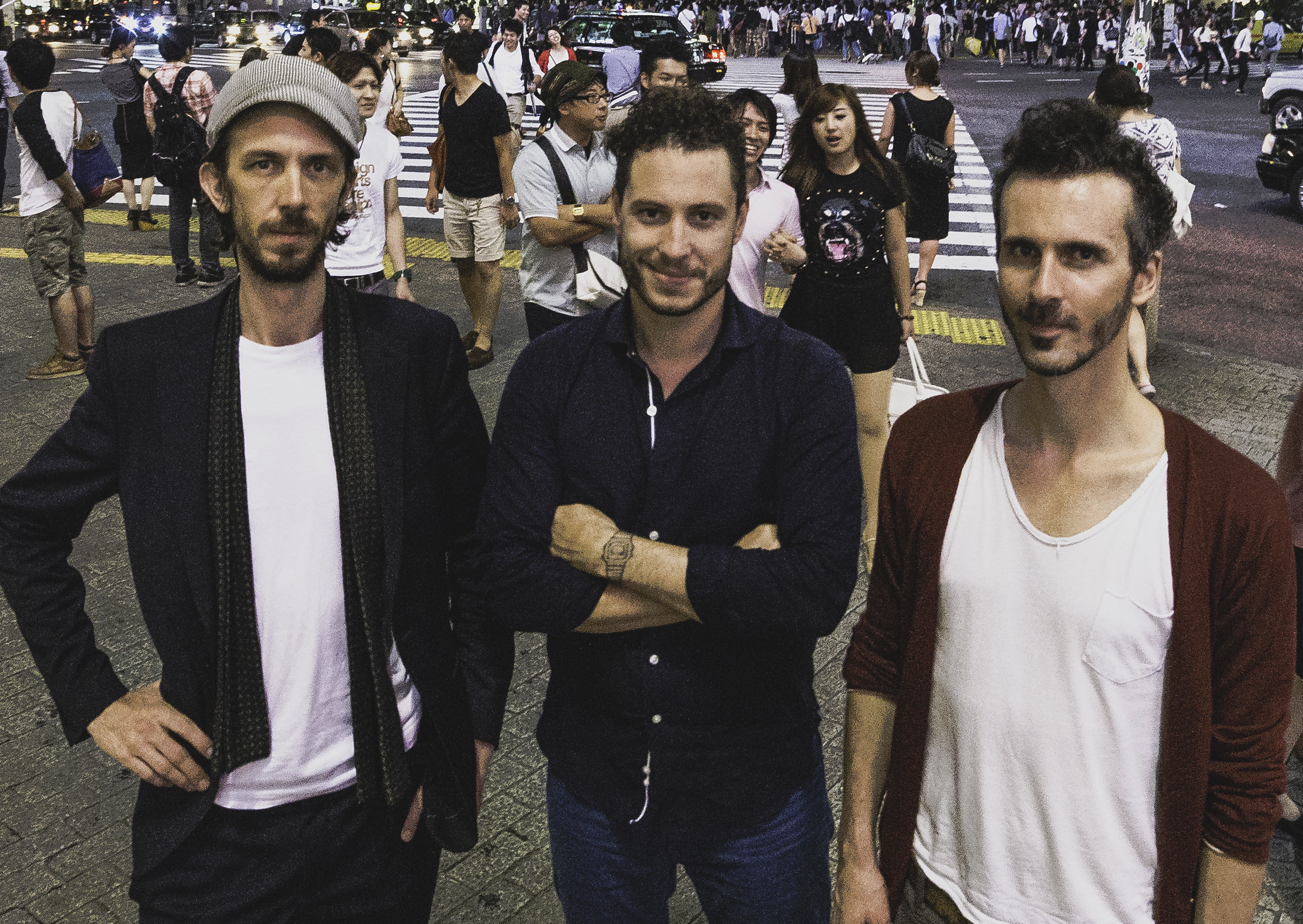
Rusconi in 2013

Rusconi was a Swiss jazz band. It was one of the most successful contemporary representatives of free rock, noise, new improvisational music, groove, and electronica in Switzerland.

== History ==
Stefan Rusconi (piano), Claudio Strüby (drums), and Richard Pechota (bass) founded Rusconi in 2001. In 2004, Fabian Gisler succeeded Pechota on the bass.

Rusconi issued their first two albums with independent Swiss labels and then got into an agreement with Sony Music Germany which in 2009 issued the album One Up Down Left Right. For all three albums mainly Stefan Rusconi wrote the music. In 2010, they dealt in their album It’s a Sonic Life with the works of Sonic Youth. The artwork is made out of video stills by Pipilotti Rist.

In 2012, Rusconi terminated the agreement with Sony Music Entertainment and founded their own label Qilin Records. With this step Rusconi wanted to enable their fans - in the age of free downloads - to support them more directly than it would have been possible with a major label. Rusconi issued their recordings on CD, and partly or exclusively on LP. With their 'Manifest' Rusconi adapted to the changed market situation.

- On 2 March 2012, they released the well known album Revolution for free downloads with Bandcamp.
- In parallel, they produced LPs of the last two albums and released them also for free downloads.
- Since December 2012, the French label BEEJAZZ distributes the album Revolution as CD.
- In 2014, the band released the album History Sugar Dream on their own label Qilin Record
- Their Live-album Rusconi + Fred Frith - live in Europe was released on Qilin Records in 2016. This was also their last album. End of 2017 Rusconi parted by mutual consent. On their website the band thanks everyone for their interest and support over the last 14 years.

Rusconi gave concerts in Switzerland, Germany, Austria, Turkey, Czech Republic, Spain, France, Italy, Sweden, Belgium, Malaysia, Indonesia, China, Japan and Korea.

=== Music videos ===
Rusconi did various video clips for their albums. In 2008, they cooperated for the first time with the Winterthur Movie Collective zweihund and produced the video clip One Up Down Left Right, which was shown at movie festivals the world over. Rusconi received three awards, e.g. the Audience Award and the Jury Award of the Solothurn Movie Days in 2010.

- In 2011, the video clip The Destroyed Room (also produced by zweihund and Rusconi) received the Jury Award of the Solothurn Movie Days.
- In 2013, the newest product of zweihund and Rusconi Alice in the sky received the award for the 'Best Swiss Video Clip' of the Solothurn Movie Days, m4music and the SUISA Foundation.

== Style and influences ==
Rusconi fused ideas from jazz, rock and pop. Styles and influences reached from the avant-garde of the electronic music (e.g. Aphex Twin) to noise rock (e.g. Sonic Youth) and to the stars of pop (Radiohead).

== Awards ==
Rusconi are the winners of several awards and rewards.

- 2009: Jury Award and Audience Award of the Solothurn Movie Days for the video clip "One up down left right" of zweihund and Rusconi
- 2010: Jury Award of the Solothurn Movie Days for the video clip Destroyed Room of zweihund and Rusconi
- 2010...2012: Support of the foundation Pro Helvetia for Stefan Rusconi and his band Rusconi within its main scope of jazz promotion
- 2013: Jury Award of the Solothurn Movie Days for the video clip "Alice in the sky" of zweihund and Rusconi
- 2013: Nomination for Prix Walo (best known Swiss award) as 'Jazz Trio of the year'
- 2013: Rusconi is winner of the Echo Jazz Award for 'Best live act 2012'

== Discography ==
- 2004: Scenes & Sceneries (Brambus Records; als Rusconi Trio)
- 2006: Stop & Go (Unit Records / Sony)
- 2009: One Up Down Left Right (Sony Music Germany)
- 2010: It's a Sonic Life (Sony Music Germany)
- 2012: Revolution (LP Qilin Records; CD BEEJAZZ)
- 2013: It's A Sonic Life (LP Qilin Records)
- 2014: History Sugar Dream (CD, LP Qilin Records)

== Bibliography ==
- - Stefan Künzli: Rusconi: Ein Schweizer Jazztrio sprengt Grenzen (A Swiss Jazz Trio Breaks Boundaries); Sonntag, February 15, 2009
- Inhaltsverzeichnis März + April 2010 - Franz X.A. Zipperer: Rusconi; Jazzthetik 3/4 2010: 20-21
- Auch ohne Kim Gordon gut - Musikblog - Volker Schmidt: Tonträger - Auch ohne Kim Gordon gut (Sound Carrier - Good Performance Even Without Kim Gordon); ZEIT Online, 2010
- Der Gewinn der Freiheit | NZZ - Uely Bernays: Der Gewinn der Freiheit - Taufe des Albums 'Revolution' (The Winner Of Freedom - Baptism Of The Album 'Revolution'); NZZ, 2012
- Hielscher, Hans (2013). "Schweizer Jazz: Die Groove-Grossmacht". Spiegel Online. (Swiss Jazz: A Great Power Of Groove)
