= 1981 European Fencing Championships =

The first European Fencing Championships were held in 1981 in Foggia, Italy. The competition consisted of individual events only.

== Medal summary ==
=== Men's events ===
| Event | Gold | Silver | Bronze |
|---|---|---|---|
| Foil | Andrea Borella (ITA) | Angelo Scuri (ITA) | Petru Kuki (ROU) |
| Épée | Angelo Mazzoni (ITA) | Stéphane Ganeff (BEL) | Zoltán Székely (HUN) |
| Sabre | Imre Gedővári (HUN) | Jacek Bierkowski (POL) | Ferdinando Meglio (ITA) |

=== Women's events ===
| Event | Gold | Silver | Bronze |
|---|---|---|---|
| Foil | Anna Rita Sparaciari (ITA) | Dorina Vaccaroni (ITA) | Cornelia Hanisch (FRG) |

=== Medal table ===
| Rank | Nation | Gold | Silver | Bronze | Total |
|---|---|---|---|---|---|
| 1 | Italy (ITA) | 3 | 2 | 1 | 6 |
| 2 | Hungary (HUN) | 1 | 0 | 1 | 2 |
| 3 | Belgium (BEL) | 0 | 1 | 0 | 1 |
| 3 | Poland (POL) | 0 | 1 | 0 | 1 |
| 5 | Romania (ROU) | 0 | 0 | 1 | 1 |
| 5 | West Germany (FRG) | 0 | 0 | 1 | 1 |
| Totals (6 entries) | | 4 | 4 | 4 | 12 |
