= European Fencing Championships =

International fencing event

- Status: active
- Frequency: annual
- Inaugurated: 1981
- Most recent: 2026
- Organiser: European Fencing Confederation
- Website: eurofencing.info

The European Fencing Championships is an annual top-level European fencing competition organized by the European Fencing Confederation.

== History ==
The first competition bearing the name of "European Fencing Championships" was held in Paris in 1921. The International Fencing Federation (FIE) comprised only European federations at the time, with the exception of the United States. In 1936, on the 25th anniversary of the FIE and at the request of the Italian federation, the FIE congress decided to open the European Championships to all countries and granted retroactive recognition of the European Championships as World Championships.

After 1937 the FIE focused on the organisation of the World Fencing Championships. Demand for European Championships appeared at the 1979 congress, but it was rejected on the ground that they would either belittle the World Championships or offer a poor fencing level. The question was put forth again the following year by the Yugoslav federation, with the support of the Italian federation, which offered to organize the first competition. The congress agreed to authorize such championships, on the condition that they would be held only when the World Championships were organized in a non-European country. The first edition took place in Foggia, Italy on 11 and 12 November 1981. They proved to cause no interference with the 1981 World Championships and the restriction was lifted.

== Formula ==
Contrary to the World Championships and the World Cup, no exemption is granted to Top 16 fencers: all fence a round of pools, which eliminates 20% to 30% of participants. The remaining fencers compete in a direct elimination table.

== Editions ==
=== Editions of European Fencing Championships ===
Number	Edition	City	Country	Events
1	1981	Foggia	Italy	4
2	1982	Mödling	Austria	4
3	1983	Lisbon	Portugal	4
4	1991	Vienna	Austria	10
5	1992	Lisbon	Portugal	5
6	1993	Linz	Austria	5
7	1994	Kraków	Poland	5
8	1995	Keszthely	Hungary	5
9	1996	Limoges	France	5
10	1997	Gdańsk	Poland	5
11	1998	Plovdiv	Bulgaria	10
12	1999	Bolzano	Italy	11
13	2000	Funchal	Portugal	12
14	2001	Koblenz	Germany	12
15	2002	Moscow	Russia	12
16	2003	Bourges	France	12
17	2004	Copenhagen	Denmark	12
18	2005	Zalaegerszeg	Hungary	12
19	2006	İzmir	Turkey	12
20	2007	Ghent	Belgium	12

Number	Edition	City	Country	Events
21	2008	Kyiv	Ukraine	12
22	2009	Plovdiv	Bulgaria	12
23	2010	Leipzig	Germany	12
24	2011	Sheffield	Great Britain	12
25	2012	Legnano	Italy	12
26	2013	Zagreb	Croatia	12
27	2014	Strasbourg	France	12
28	2015	Montreux	Switzerland	12
29	2016	Toruń	Poland	12
30	2017	Tbilisi	Georgia	12
31	2018	Novi Sad	Serbia	12
32	2019	Düsseldorf	Germany	12
33	2022	Antalya	Turkey	12
34	2023	Plovdiv	Bulgaria	6
34	2023	Kraków	Poland	6
35	2024	Basel	Switzerland	12
36	2025	Genoa	Italy	12
37	2026	Antony	France	12

^{1} 2020 and 2021 European Fencing Championships were cancelled due to COVID-19 pandemic.

== Medal table ==
Last updated after the 2026 European Fencing Championships.

Rank	Nation	Gold	Silver	Bronze	Total
1	Italy	89	66	103	258
2	Russia	76	67	66	209
3	France	55	56	75	186
4	Hungary	37	42	58	137
5	Germany	33	30	63	126
6	Poland	17	26	49	92
7	Ukraine	17	20	36	73
8	Romania	16	18	27	61
9	Switzerland	7	7	13	27
10	Estonia	5	10	10	25
11	Spain	4	2	10	16
12	Austria	3	5	10	18
13	Georgia	3	0	3	6
14	Belarus	2	2	5	9
15	West Germany	2	2	1	5
–	Individual Neutral Athletes (Note: At the 2023, 2025 and 2026 European Championships, in accordance with sanctions imposed following by the 2022 Russian invasion of Ukraine, fencers from Russia were not permitted to use the name, flag, or anthem of Russia. They instead participated as "Individual Neutral Athletes (AIN)", their medals were not included in the official medal table.)	2	1	4	7
16	Azerbaijan	2	0	3	5
17	Great Britain	1	4	9	14
18	Israel	1	2	1	4
19	Portugal	1	1	2	4
20	Greece	0	3	3	6
21	Netherlands	0	3	1	4
22	Belgium	0	2	1	3
22	Bulgaria	0	2	1	3
24	Sweden	0	1	5	6
25	Denmark	0	1	1	2
26	Czech Republic	0	0	4	4
27	Turkey	0	0	3	3
28	Czechoslovakia	0	0	2	2
Totals (28 entries)		373	373	569	1,315

== Multiple gold medalists ==
Boldface denotes active fencers and highest medal count among all fencers (including these who not included in these tables) per type.

=== Men ===
==== All events ====
Rank	Fencer	Country	Weapon	From	To	Gold	Silver	Bronze	Total
1	Aleksey Yakimenko	Russia	Sabre	2003	2017	**13**	5	5	**23**
2	Stanislav Pozdnyakov	Russia	Sabre	1994	2008	**13**	–	4	17
3	Andrea Cassarà	Italy	Foil	2002	2019	10	4	1	15
4	Andrea Baldini	Italy	Foil	2004	2016	8	2	5	15
5	Gábor Boczkó	Hungary	Épée	1997	2015	7	5	3	15
6	**Áron Szilágyi**	Hungary	Sabre	2011	2026	6	4	3	13
7	Géza Imre	Hungary	Épée	1998	2013	6	4	2	12
8	Aleksey Frosin	Russia	Sabre	1997	2008	6	1	2	9
9	**Yannick Borel**	France	Épée	2011	2022	6	1	1	8
10	Aldo Montano	Italy	Sabre	2002	2019	5	5	1	11

==== Individual events ====
Rank	Fencer	Country	Weapon	From	To	Gold	Silver	Bronze	Total
1	Aleksey Yakimenko	Russia	Sabre	2003	2016	**5**	**4**	3	**12**
2	Stanislav Pozdnyakov	Russia	Sabre	1994	2007	**5**	–	2	7
3	Andrea Cassarà	Italy	Foil	2002	2015	4	1	–	5
4	**Yannick Borel**	France	Épée	2016	2022	4	–	–	4
5	Gábor Boczkó	Hungary	Épée	1997	2015	3	1	2	6
6	Andrea Baldini	Italy	Foil	2005	2013	3	–	3	6
7	Pavel Kolobkov	Russia	Épée	1996	2006	2	3	**4**	9
8	Daniele Garozzo	Italy	Foil	2015	2022	2	3	–	5
9	Aleksey Cheremisinov	Russia	Foil	2011	2019	2	2	2	6
10	Max Hartung	Germany	Sabre	2011	2019	2	1	2	5

=== Women ===
==== All events ====
Rank	Fencer	Country	Weapon	From	To	Gold	Silver	Bronze	Total
1	**Arianna Errigo**	Italy	Foil	2009	2026	**16**	4	4	**24**
2	**Sofya Velikaya**	Russia	Sabre	2003	2019	14	6	3	23
3	Valentina Vezzali	Italy	Foil	1993	2015	13	4	4	21
4	Elisa Di Francisca	Italy	Foil	2004	2019	13	2	3	18
5	**Olha Kharlan**	Ukraine	Sabre	2005	2024	8	**8**	6	22
6	Ana Maria Popescu (Brânză)	Romania	Épée	2006	2016	7	4	2	13
7	**Martina Batini**	Italy	Foil	2014	2026	7	2	1	10
8	**Yana Egorian**	Russia; Individual Neutral Athletes	Sabre	2013	2026	7	2	–	9
9	Simona Gherman (Alexandru)	Romania	Épée	2008	2016	7	1	2	10
10	Yekaterina Dyachenko	Russia	Sabre	2006	2016	6	4	1	11

==== Individual events ====
Rank	Fencer	Country	Weapon	From	To	Gold	Silver	Bronze	Total
1	**Olha Kharlan**	Ukraine	Sabre	2006	2019	**6**	1	1	8
2	Valentina Vezzali	Italy	Foil	1993	2014	5	**3**	2	**10**
3	**Sofya Velikaya**	Russia	Sabre	2005	2019	5	**3**	1	9
4	Elisa Di Francisca	Italy	Foil	2006	2019	5	1	1	7
5	**Arianna Errigo**	Italy	Foil	2009	2024	3	2	3	8
6	Laura Badea-Cârlescu	Romania	Foil	1993	2004	3	2	2	7
7	Sylwia Gruchała	Poland	Foil	2000	2005	3	–	–	3
8	**Inna Deriglazova**	Russia	Foil	2010	2019	2	2	1	5
9	Sabine Bau	Germany	Foil	1992	2001	2	1	1	4
9	Yekaterina Fedorkina	Russia	Sabre	2004	2008	2	1	1	4

== See also ==
- Fencing at the Summer Olympics
- World Fencing Championships
- other zone championships: African Fencing Championships, Asian Fencing Championships, Pan American Fencing Championships
