= Mario Aldo Montano =

Italian fencer

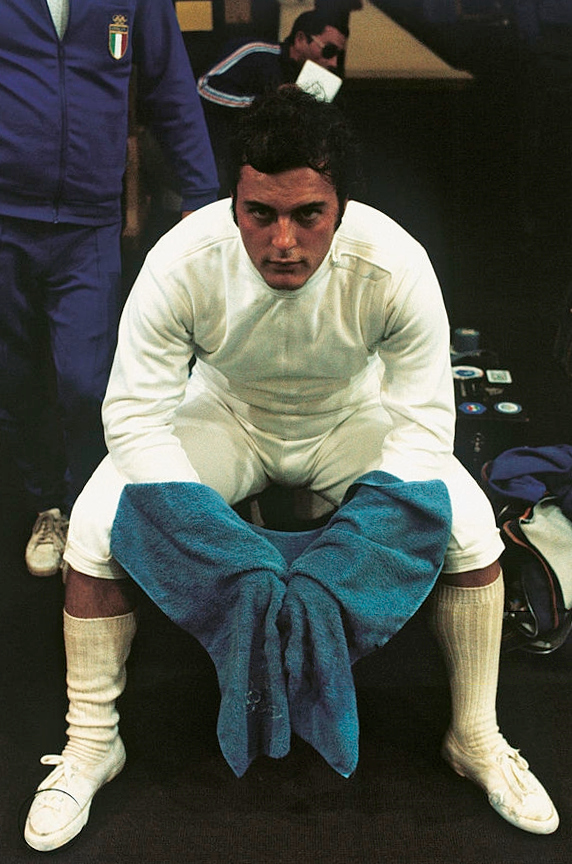
- Mario Aldo Montano at the 1972 Olympics

Personal information
- Born: 1 May 1948 (age 78) Livorno, Italy
- Height: 1.81 m (5 ft 11 in)
- Weight: 93 kg (205 lb)

Sport
- Sport: Fencing
Medal record
Representing Italy
Olympic Games
Gold medal – first place	1972 Munich	Team sabre
Silver medal – second place	1976 Montréal	Team sabre
Silver medal – second place	1980 Moscow	Team sabre
Mediterranean Games
Silver medal – second place	1975 Algiers	Individual sabre
Silver medal – second place	1979 Split	Individual sabre
Bronze medal – third place	1971 Izmir	Individual sabre

Mario Aldo Montano (born 1 May 1948) is an Italian fencer. He won a gold and two silver medals in the team sabre at three Olympic Games. He also competed at the Mediterranean Games in the individual sabre event where he won silver medals in 1975 and 1979 and a bronze medal in 1971.

He is the son of fencer Aldo Montano who competed for Italy at the 1936 and 1948 Summer Olympics. His son, also called Aldo Montano, competed at the 2004, 2008 and 2012 Summer Olympics.

== See also ==
- Italy national fencing team – Multiple medallist
