= Italian Fencing Federation =

Italian fencing governing body

Federazione Italiana Scherma
- Sport: Fencing
- Jurisdiction: Italy
- Abbreviation: FIS
- Founded: 1909
- Affiliation: FIE
- Affiliation date: 1913
- Headquarters: Rome
- Location: Italy
- President: Giorgio Scarso

Official website
- www.federscherma.it

The Italian Fencing Federation (Italian: Federazione Italiana Scherma, FIS) is the national governing body for the fencing sport in Italy. The FIS is currently based in Rome. The FIS was founded in 1909 and was one of the nine founding nations of The Fédération Internationale d'Escrime (FIE) in 1913. The FIS has in total achieved 219 medals at Euro Championships, 319 medals at the World Championships and 123 Olympic medals. FIS is funded mainly by sponsors among which are Kinder.

== Ruling body ==
The Italian Fencing Federation has been overseen by President Giorgio Scarso since 2001. The two VPs are Vice President Paolo Azzi and Vice President Giampiero Pastore. Alberto Ancarani, Other board members are Giuseppe Cafiero, Renato Buratti, Luigi Campofreda, Vincenzo De Bartolomeo, Salvatore Lauria, and Elisa Uga. The ruling body oversees 273 clubs within Italy. The regulating body is responsible for organizing all tournaments in Italy, enforcing rules set by both itself and the FIE. and reaching out to other nations to expand and grow the sport. President Giorgio Scarso first started his work in the FIS in 1973 and in 1974 sent the first team to compete internationally in small tournaments to El Salvador.

== Ratings ==
The FIS ranking system gives each competitor one score per tournament based on their performance. Each score from each tournament is added together to become each player's total rank. This ranking system determines which players can go to which tournaments, the top players going to the Olympics. The FIS also has four different age groupings. Which group a person is in is based on their age at the start of each year. The youngest age group Giovanissimi meaning "very young" are ages 11 to 14. The second group Giovani, also meaning "young", are ages 15 to 19. The majority of people competing fall into the group Assoluti, meaning "absolute", being over age 15. The oldest age group is Master which consists of everyone over the age of 24. Anyone In the Assoluti group can be pulled to go to the Olympics.

== Performance of fencers ==
According to the Italian National Fencing Team wiki page, Italian fencers hold the most medals in The Olympic Games, The World Championships, and the European Championships. For more detailed lists for all major tournaments ever participated in by Italian fencers see here.

Event	Gold medal	Silver medal	Bronze medal	Total
Olympic Games	50	49	36	135
World Championships	122	112	137	371
European Championships	82	63	93	238

== Tournaments ==
The Italian Fencing Federation host competitions for men and women's Épée, Foil, and Sabre year round each year a ranking scores are refreshed. The FIS's most successful players in major tournaments use the Épée fencing style. The FIS also hosts tournaments for those with varying physical abilities, but they do not receive rankings. The FIS also is known for sending competitors abroad to compete in other countries.

== Top fencers ==
The top fencers in the FIS as of the last Olympic Games are.

1. Valentina Vezzali
2. Nedo Nadi
3. Edoardo Mangiarotti
4. Giovanna Trillini
5. Giulio Gaudini

== See also ==
- Italy national fencing team
