= Robert Feyerick =

Belgian fencer

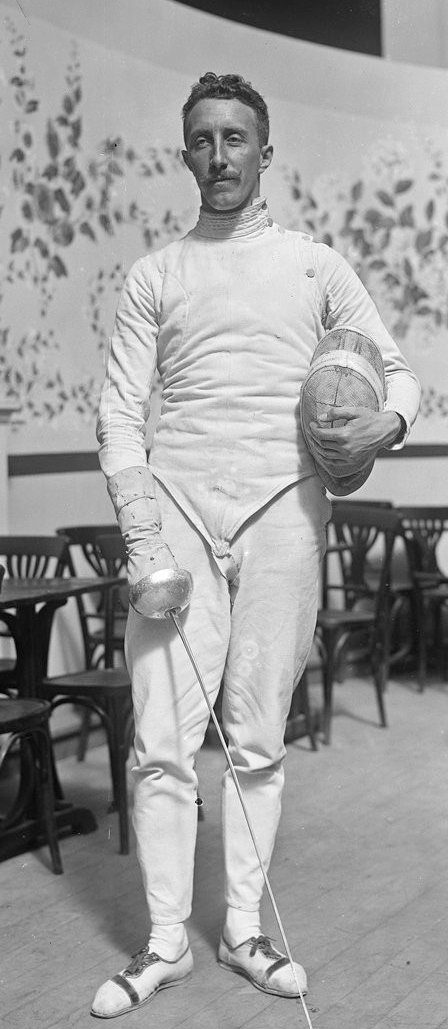
- Robert Feyerick at the 1922 European Championships

Personal information
- Born: 18 January 1892 Ghent, Belgium
- Died: 18 June 1940 (aged 48) Sint-Andries, West Flanders, Belgium

Sport
- Sport: Fencing

Robert Léon Feyerick (18 January 1892 – 18 June 1940) was a Belgian fencer. He competed in the individual and team sabre events at the 1920 and the 1924 Summer Olympics with the best result of fourth place in the team competition in 1920. His father Ferdinand was also an Olympic fencer.

He was killed in action during World War II.
