= Giulio Rusconi =

Italian fencer (1885–1968)

Personal information
- Born: 3 October 1885 Florence, Italy
- Died: 30 November 1968 (aged 83) Florence, Italy

Sport
- Sport: Fencing

Giulio Francesco Raffaele Maria Rusconi (3 October 1885 – 30 November 1968) was an Italian fencer. He competed in the individual sabre event at the 1920 Summer Olympics.
