= Herbert Huntington (fencer) =

British fencer (1888–1968)

Herbert Huntington OBE
Personal information
- Born: 15 January 1888 Penarth Vale of Glamorgan, Wales
- Died: Q2, 1968 (aged 80) Ealing, London

Sport
- Sport: Fencing

Herbert Francis Searancke Huntington OBE (15 January 1888 – 1968) was a British fencer. He competed in the individual and team sabre events at the 1920 Summer Olympics.

In addition to fencing, Huntington was a boxer and, in 1912, the Army and Navy Officers' middleweight champion. During World War I, Huntington served as a superintendent of physical training and was mentioned in dispatches while serving with the 2nd Welsh Regiment in France. In 1920, in addition to competing in the Summer Olympics, he was the Services middleweight and heavyweight boxing champion.

In 1921, he won the épée title at the British Fencing Championships and won the Services heavyweight boxing title. He served at command headquarters before he retired in 1923 and later received an OBE.
