= Aldo Nadi =

Italian fencer

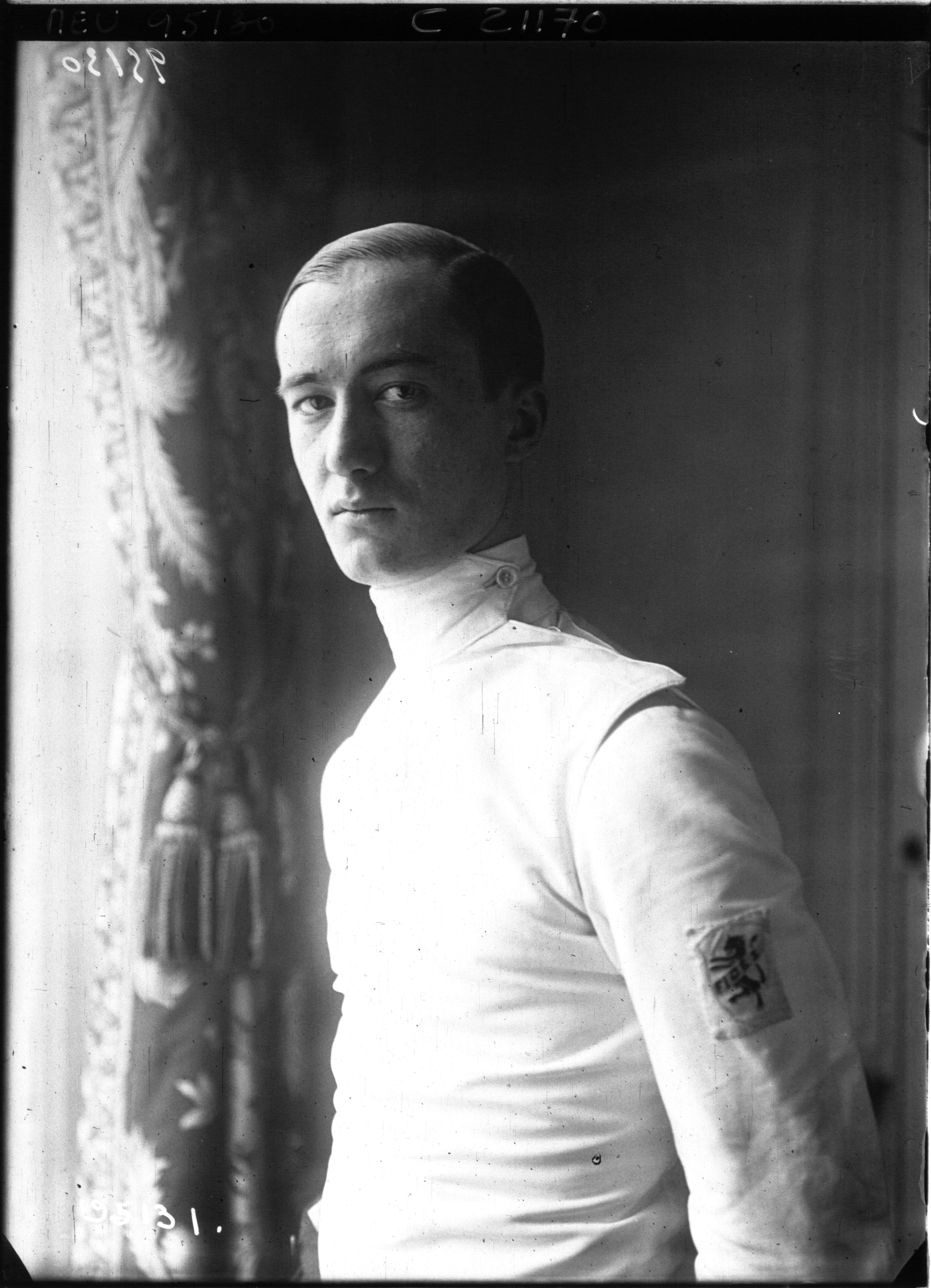
- Nadi in 1922

Personal information
- Born: 29 April 1899 Livorno, Tuscany, Italy
- Died: 10 November 1965 (aged 66) Los Angeles, California, U.S.
- Height: 1.83 m (6 ft 0 in)
- Weight: 69 kg (152 lb)

Sport
- Sport: Fencing
Medal record
Representing Italy
Olympic Games
| Gold medal – first place | 1920 Antwerp | Team foil |
| Gold medal – first place | 1920 Antwerp | Team épée |
| Gold medal – first place | 1920 Antwerp | Team sabre |
| Silver medal – second place | 1920 Antwerp | Individual sabre |

Aldo Nadi (29 April 1899 – 10 November 1965) was an Italian fencing champion.

== Biography ==
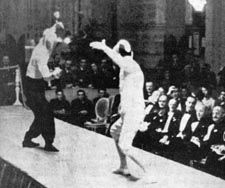
Aldo and Nedo Nadi

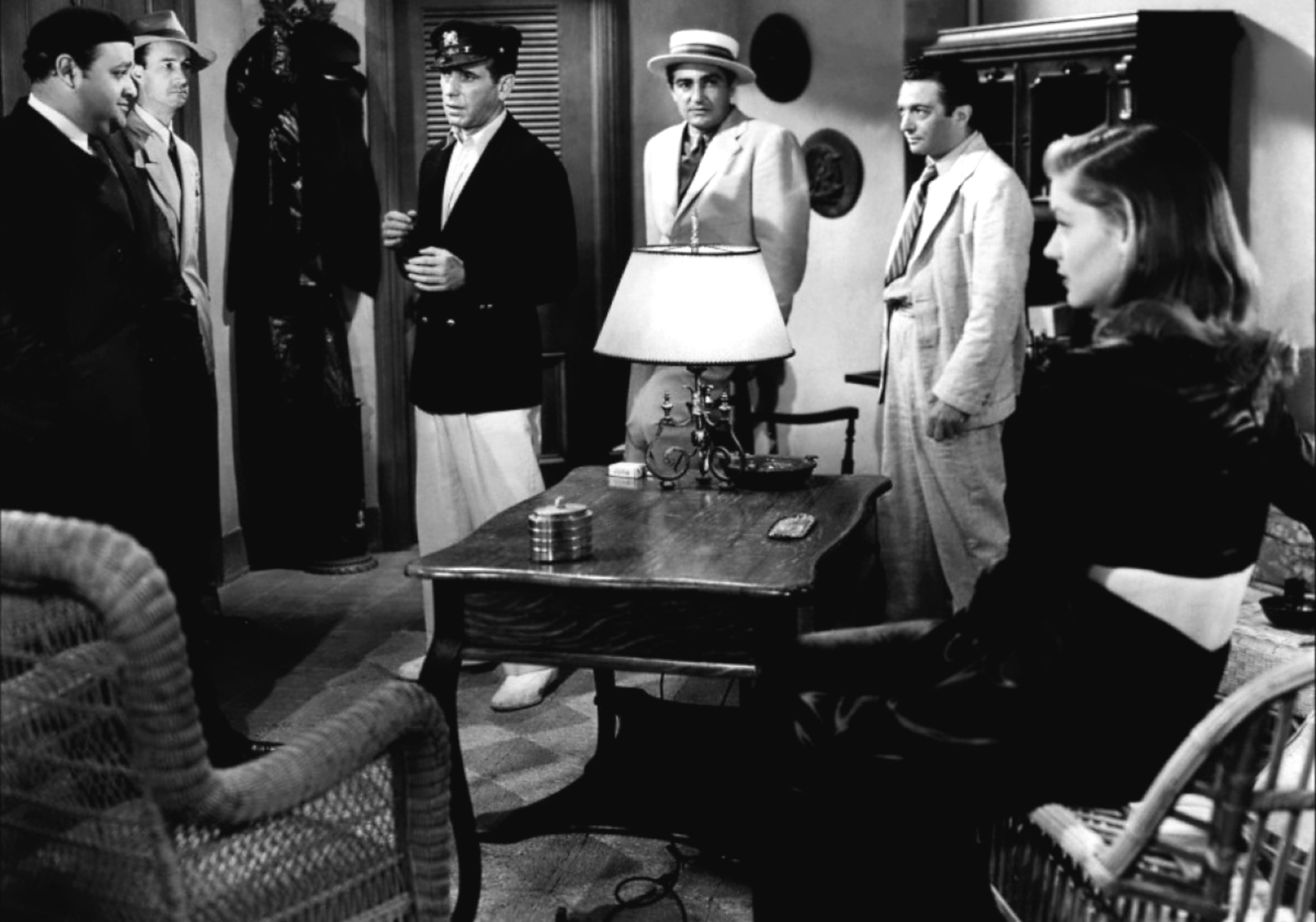
Aldo Nadi (second from left) in To Have and Have Not (1944)

Aldo was born into a fencing family in Livorno, Italy, and both Aldo and his brother Nedo Nadi were fencers from a very young age. They were both taught foil and sabre in the classical Italian school of swordsmanship by their father, Beppe Nadi, who believed the épée to be an "undisciplined" weapon and refused to teach it. The brothers therefore practiced épée by themselves.

In 1920, at the age of 21, Nadi won gold medals at the Olympics in team foil, team épée, and team sabre. He also won a silver medal in individual sabre, second only to his brother Nedo.

Nadi emigrated to the United States in 1935. He taught fencing in New York City from 1935 to 1943, and in 1943 published a book On Fencing. Also in 1943, he relocated to Los Angeles, California, where he continued to teach fencing in his own school, in addition to occasionally coaching actors for fencing scenes in films. He made a film appearance, as a bodyguard in To Have and Have Not (1944), starring Humphrey Bogart.

Nadi was known for his real-life duels. At the 1920 Olympics, he fought Italian weightlifter Filippo Bottino with a riding whip, while Bottino used a wooden beam. The duel ended very quickly as Nadi struck Bottino's hand, causing him to drop the weapon. Later Nadi fought and severely injured a journalist who had mocked him. He also challenged a fellow fencing champion Edoardo Mangiarotti because he felt that Mangiarotti was favored over him by the Italian Olympic Committee. Nadi proposed to use pistols, which Mangiarotti declined.

In 1955, Nadi wrote his autobiography (The Living Sword: A Fencer's Autobiography), which was published 30 years after his death.

Nadi died in his sleep, at his home in Los Angeles, on 10 November 1965.

== Filmography ==
| Year | Title | Role | Notes |
|---|---|---|---|
| 1928 | Le Tournoi dans la cité | François de Baynes | |
| 1944 | To Have and Have Not | Renard's Bodyguard | (final film role) |

== Bibliography ==
- Nadi, Aldo (1994). On Fencing. Sunrise, FL: Laureate Press. ISBN 1-884528-04-X.
- Nadi, Aldo (April 1995). The Living Sword: A Fencer's Autobiography. Sunrise, FL: Laureate Press. ISBN 1-884528-20-1.

== See also ==
- List of USFA Hall of Fame members
