= Frederick Cunningham =

American fencer

Personal information
- Born: July 6, 1898 Boston, Massachusetts, United States
- Died: December 17, 1978 (aged 80) Bethesda, Maryland, United States

Sport
- Sport: Fencing

Frederick John Cunningham (July 6, 1898 – December 17, 1978) was an American fencer. He competed in the individual and team sabre events at the 1920 Summer Olympics.
