= Edwin Fullinwider =

American fencer

Personal information
- Full name: Edwin Gaines Fullinwider
- Nickname: Fully
- Born: December 11, 1900 Raton, New Mexico, US
- Died: February 8, 1982 (aged 81) Washington, D.C., US
- Resting place: Arlington National Cemetery; Sec. 30, Grave 654-4
- Military career
- Allegiance: United States of America
- Branch: United States Navy
- Rank: Rear admiral
- Conflicts: World War II

Sport
- Country: United States of America
- Sport: Fencing

Edwin Gaines Fullinwider (December 11, 1900–February 8, 1982) was an American sabre fencer. He competed at the 1920 and 1924 Summer Olympics.
