= Roscoe Bowman =

American fencer (1900–1964)

Personal information
- Born: March 21, 1900 Carroll, Iowa, United States
- Died: September 24, 1964 (aged 64) Washington, District of Columbia, United States

Sport
- Sport: Fencing

Roscoe Leroy Bowman (March 21, 1900 – September 24, 1964) was an American fencer. He competed in the individual and team sabre events at the 1920 Summer Olympics.
