= Dorna-Arini =

- Commune
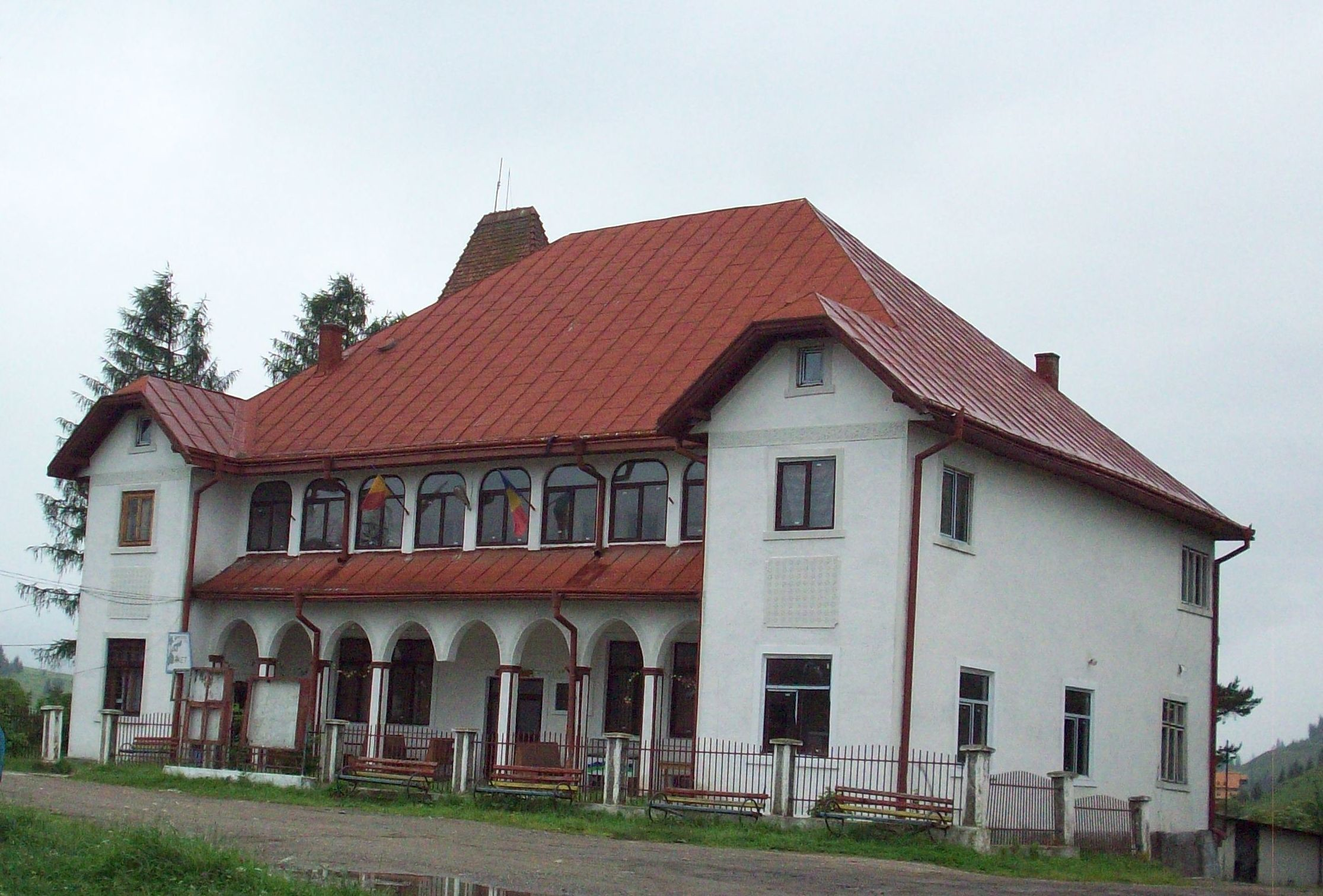
- The cultural house in Dorna-Arini

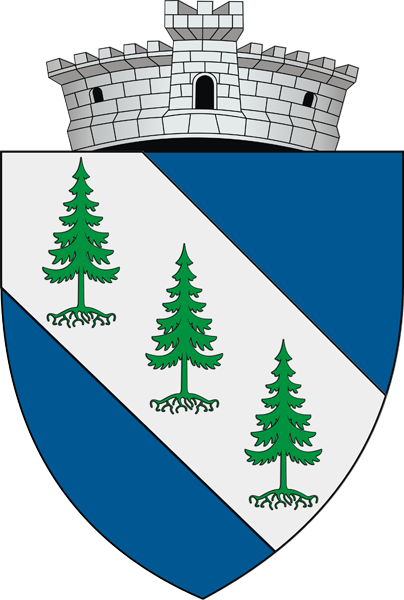
- Coat of arms

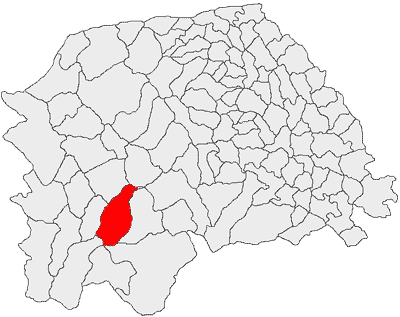
- Location in Suceava County

- Location in Romania
- Coordinates: 47°20′N 25°27′E
- Country: Romania
- County: Suceava
- Subdivisions: Dorna-Arini, Cozănești, Gheorghițeni, Ortoaia, Rusca, Sunători

Government
  - Mayor (2024–2028): Andrei Ștefăniță Mazăre (PNL)
- Area: 147 km^{2} (57 sq mi)
- Elevation: 800 m (2,600 ft)
- Population (2021-12-01): 2,828
  - Density: 19.2/km^{2} (49.8/sq mi)
- Time zone: UTC+02:00 (EET)
  - Summer (DST): UTC+03:00 (EEST)
- Postal code: 727200
- Area code: (+40) x30
- Vehicle reg.: SV
- Website: dornaarinisv.ro

Dorna-Arini is a commune located in Suceava County, mainly in the historical region of Western Moldavia, northeastern Romania. It is composed of six villages, more specifically: Cozănești (the commune center), Dorna-Arini, Gheorghițeni, Ortoaia, Rusca, and Sunători. The former Dorna pe Giumalău commune (today part of Dorna-Arini) is located in Bukovina.

== Administration and local politics ==
=== Communal council ===
The commune's current local council has the following political composition, according to the results of the 2020 Romanian local elections:

Party	Seats	Current Council
National Liberal Party (PNL)	6	
Social Democratic Party (PSD)	3	
PRO Romania (PRO)	1	
Save Romania Union (USR)	1	

== Gallery ==
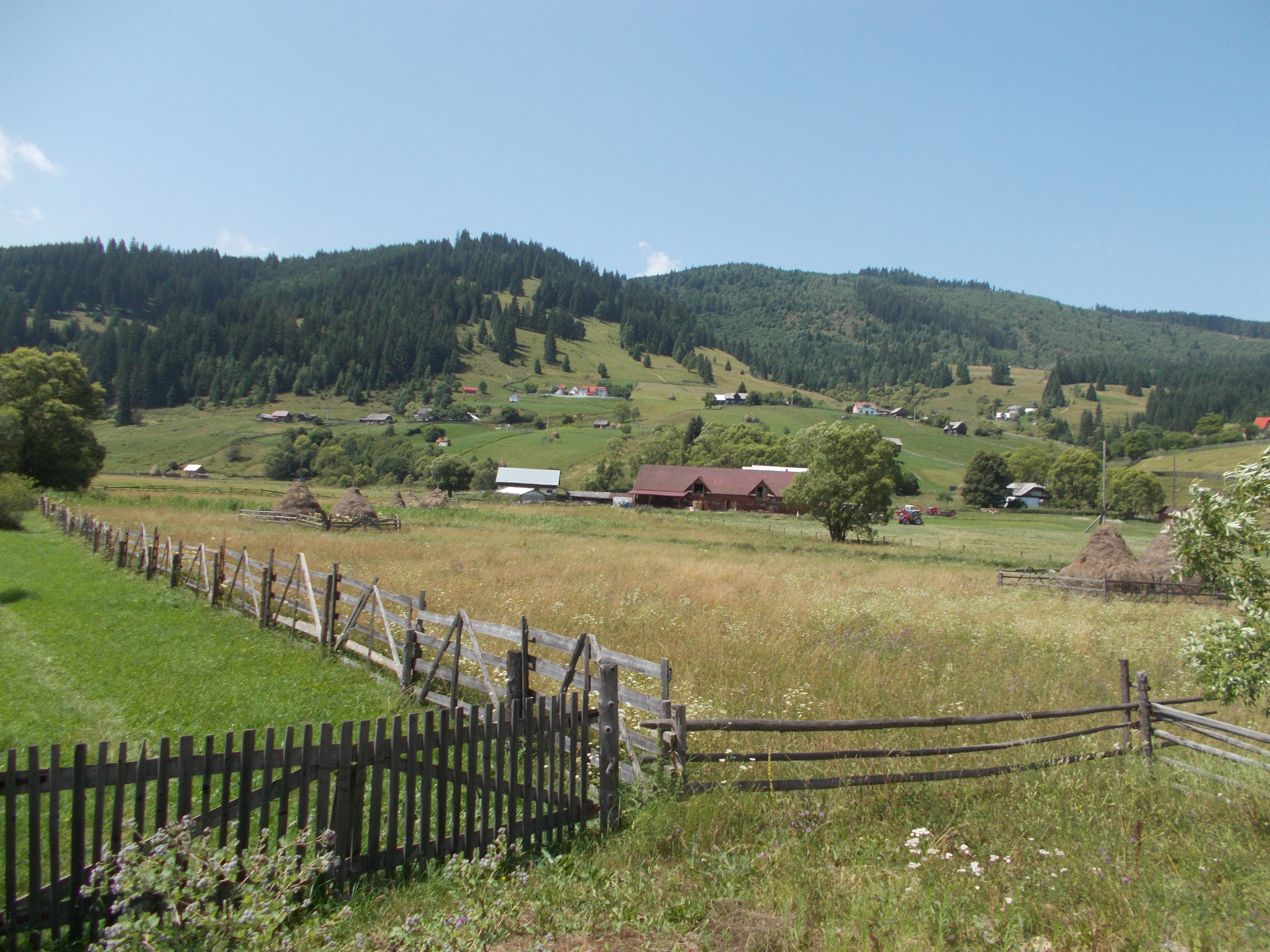
Gheorghițeni village

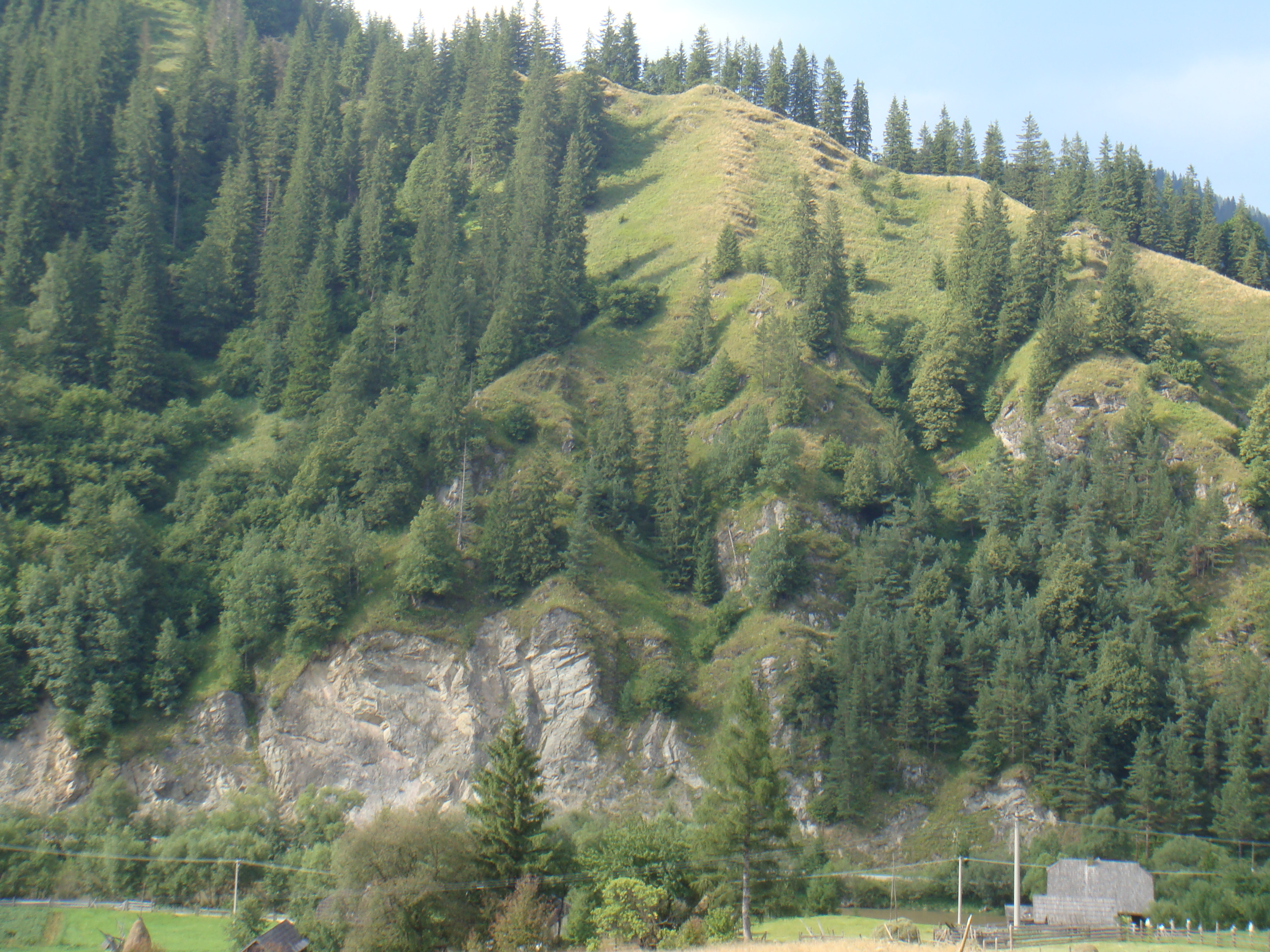
Sunători village

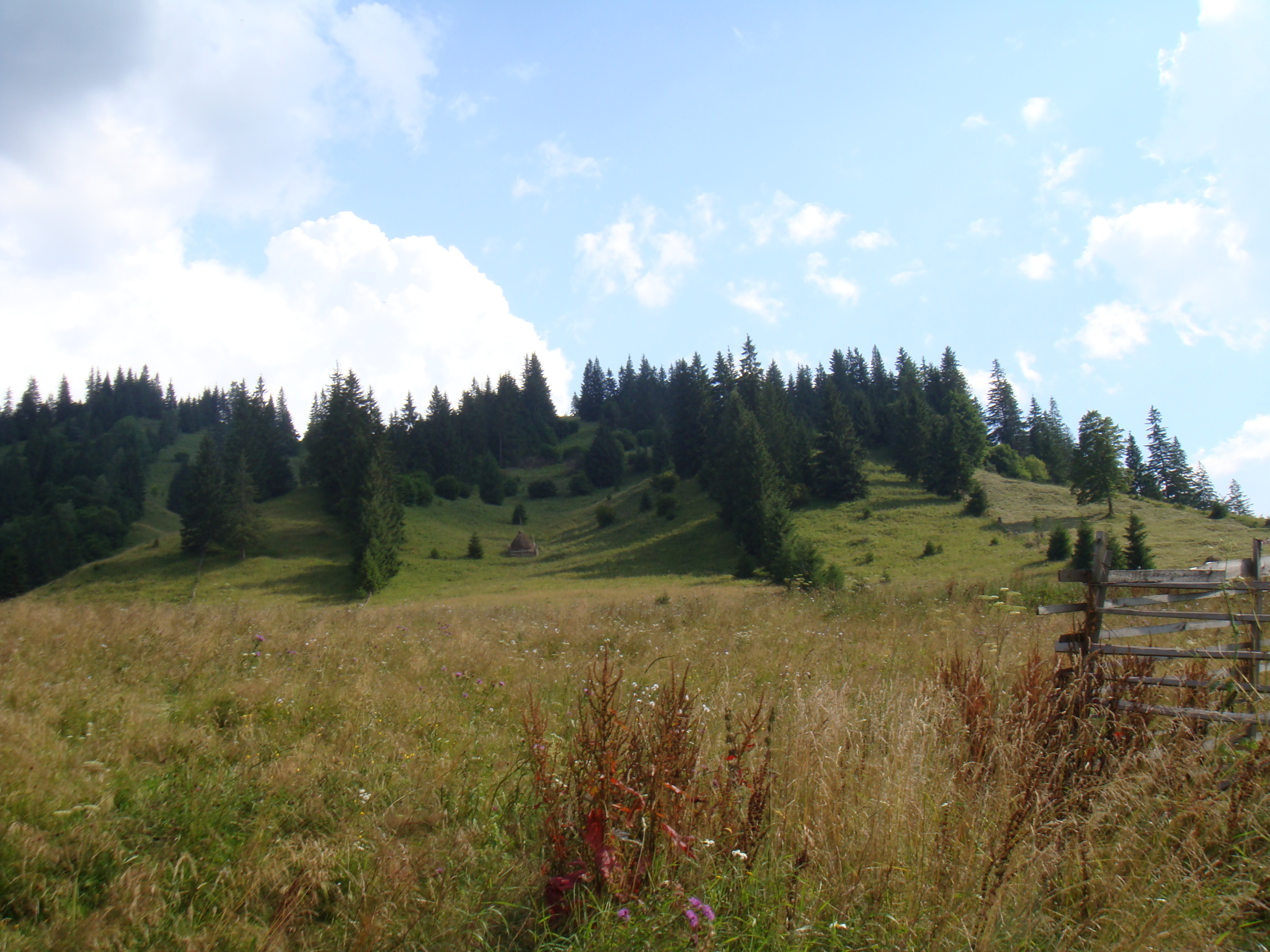
Sunători village
