= Fencing at the 1936 Summer Olympics – Men's team épée =

Men's team épée at the Games of the XI Olympiad
- Venue: Imperial Sports Field, Berlin
- Dates: 7–8 August 1936
- Competitors: 108 from 21 nations

Medalists
1st place, gold medalist(s)		Edoardo Mangiarotti; Giancarlo Cornaggia-Medici; Saverio Ragno; Franco Riccardi; Giancarlo Brusati; Alfredo Pezzana	Italy
2nd place, silver medalist(s)		Hans Granfelt; Gösta Almgren; Hans Drakenberg; Birger Cederin	Sweden
3rd place, bronze medalist(s)		Philippe Cattiau; Bernard Schmetz; Georges Buchard; Michel Pécheux; Henri Dulieux; Paul Wormser	France

The men's team épée was one of seven fencing events on the fencing at the 1936 Summer Olympics programme. It was the seventh appearance of the event. The competition was held from 7 August 1936 to 8 August 1936. 108 fencers from 21 nations competed. Each team could have a maximum of six fencers, with four participating in any given match.

The competition format continued the pool play round-robin from prior years. Each of the four fencers from one team would face each of the four from the other, for a total of 16 bouts per match. Individual bouts were to 3 touches. Individual bouts awarded 2 points to the victor's team, or 1 point to each team if the individual bout was a 3–3 tie. The team with more points won the match, with competition potentially stopping when one team reached 17 points out of the possible 32, if further competition was not necessary to determine tie-breakers for advancement. If the points were tied at 16, touches received was used to determine the winning team. Pool matches unnecessary to the result were not played.

== Rosters ==
Argentina

- Raúl Saucedo
- Luis Lucchetti
- Antonio Villamil
- Roberto Larraz
- Héctor Lucchetti

Austria

- Karl Hanisch
- Hans Schönbaumsfeld
- Roman Fischer
- Hugo Weczerek
- Rudolf Weber

Belgium

- Raymond Stasse
- Robert T'Sas
- Charles Debeur
- Hervé, Count du Monceau de Bergendael
- Jean Plumier
- Marcel Heim

Brazil

- Moacyr Dunham
- Ricardo Vagnotti
- Henrique de Aguilar
- Ennio de Oliveira

Canada

- Don Collinge
- Ernest Dalton
- Charles Otis
- George Tully

Chile

- Ricardo Romero
- César Barros
- Tomas Barraza
- Julio Moreno
- Tomás Goyoaga

Czechoslovakia

- Robert Bergmann
- František Vohryzek
- Bohuslav Kirchmann
- Josef Kunt
- Alfred Klausnitzer
- Václav Rais

Denmark

- Erik Hammer Sørensen
- Caspar Schrøder
- Aage Leidersdorff
- Preben Christiansen

Egypt

- Mahmoud Abdin
- Marcel Boulad
- Mauris Shamil
- Hassan Hosni Tawfik
- Anwar Tawfik

France

- Philippe Cattiau
- Bernard Schmetz
- Georges Buchard
- Michel Pécheux
- Henri Dulieux
- Paul Wormser

Germany

- Siegfried Lerdon
- Sepp Uhlmann
- Hans Esser
- Eugen Geiwitz
- Ernst Röthig
- Otto Schröder

Great Britain

- Charles de Beaumont
- Douglas Dexter
- Bert Pelling
- Ian Campbell-Gray
- Terry Beddard
- Bertie Childs

Greece

- Khristos Zalokostas
- Konstantinos Botasis
- Tryfon Triantafyllakos
- Konstantinos Bembis

Hungary

- Jenő Borovszki
- Tibor Székelyhidy
- Béla Bay
- Pál Dunay
- István Bezegh-Huszágh

Italy

- Edoardo Mangiarotti
- Giancarlo Cornaggia-Medici
- Saverio Ragno
- Franco Riccardi
- Giancarlo Brusati
- Alfredo Pezzana

Netherlands

- Nicolaas van Hoorn
- Jan Schepers
- Willem Driebergen
- Cornelis Weber

Poland

- Alfred Staszewicz
- Teodor Zaczyk
- Rajmund Karwicki
- Roman Kantor
- Kazimierz Szempliński
- Antoni Franz

Portugal

- Henrique da Silveira
- Paulo Leal
- António de Menezes
- João Sassetti
- Gustavo Carinhas

Sweden

- Hans Granfelt
- Gösta Almgren
- Hans Drakenberg
- Birger Cederin

Switzerland

- Jean Hauert
- Édouard Fitting
- Frédéric Fitting
- Edmond Göldlin
- Paul de Graffenried
- Charles Hauert

United States

- Frank Righeimer
- Thomas Sands
- Tracy Jaeckel
- Gustave Heiss
- Joe de Capriles
- Andrew Boyd

== Results ==
=== Round 1 ===
The top two teams in each pool advanced to round 2.

==== Pool 1 ====
Poland defeated Portugal, 18 points to 14 (9–7). Switzerland defeated Poland on touches received, 32–35, after the points were tied at 16–16 with bouts won 8–8. Portugal defeated Switzerland 9–7 (18–14 on points). Switzerland was eliminated.

Rank	Country	Points	MW	ML	BW	BL	BT	Notes
1	Poland	2	1	1	17	15	0	Q
2	Portugal	2	1	1	16	16	0	Q
3	Switzerland	2	1	1	15	17	0	

==== Pool 2 ====
The Netherlands defeated Denmark, 18 points to 14, with an 8–6–2 individual bout result. The United States–Denmark match was stopped after 12 of 16 bouts when the Americans reached 18 points, 9–3. The United States did not play the Netherlands, as both advanced while Denmark was eliminated.

Rank	Country	Points	MW	ML	BW	BL	BT	Notes
1	United States	2	1	0	9	3	0	Q
2	Netherlands	2	1	0	8	6	2	Q
3	Denmark	0	0	2	9	17	2	

==== Pool 3 ====
Great Britain defeated Chile, 26 points to 6, with a 12–2–2 individual bout result. The France–Chile match was stopped after 9 of 16 bouts when the French team reached 17 points, 8–0–1. France did not play Great Britain, as both advanced while Chile was eliminated.

Rank	Country	Points	MW	ML	BW	BL	BT	Notes
1	Great Britain	2	1	0	12	2	2	Q
2	France	2	1	0	8	0	1	Q
3	Chile	0	0	2	2	20	3	

==== Pool 4 ====
Egypt defeated Austria, 18 points to 14, with a 9–7 individual bout result. The Sweden–Austria match was stopped after 10 of 16 bouts when the Swedes reached 18 points, 9–1. Sweden did not play Egypt, as both advanced while Austria was eliminated.

Rank	Country	Points	MW	ML	BW	BL	BT	Notes
1	Sweden	2	1	0	9	1	0	Q
2	Egypt	2	1	0	9	7	0	Q
3	Austria	0	0	2	8	18	0	

==== Pool 5 ====
Argentina defeated Greece, 26 points to 6, with an 11–1–4 individual bout result. The Belgium–Greece match was stopped after 11 of 16 bouts when the Belgians reached 17 points, 8–2–1. Belgium did not play Argentina, as both advanced while Greece was eliminated.

Rank	Country	Points	MW	ML	BW	BL	BT	Notes
1	Argentina	2	1	0	11	1	4	Q
2	Belgium	2	1	0	8	2	1	Q
3	Greece	0	0	2	3	19	5	

==== Pool 6 ====
Czechoslovakia defeated Hungary, 17 points to 15, with an 8–7–1 individual bout result. The Italy–Hungary match was stopped after 11 of 16 bouts when the Italians reached 17 points, 8–2–1. Italy did not play Czechoslovakia, as both advanced while Hungary was eliminated.

Rank	Country	Points	MW	ML	BW	BL	BT	Notes
1	Italy	2	1	0	8	2	1	Q
2	Czechoslovakia	2	1	0	8	7	1	Q
3	Hungary	0	0	2	9	16	2	

==== Pool 7 ====
Germany defeated Canada, 22 points to 10, with an 11–5 individual bout result. Canada then defeated Brazil, 17–15 points (8–7–1 bouts). The Germany–Brazil match resulted in a German win, 19–13 on points (9–6–1 bouts). This put Germany in first place at 2–0, Canada second at 1–1, and Brazil eliminated in third place at 0–2.

Rank	Country	Points	MW	ML	BW	BL	BT	Notes
1	Germany	4	2	0	20	11	1	Q
2	Canada	2	1	1	13	18	1	Q
3	Brazil	0	0	2	13	17	2	

=== Round 2 ===
The top two teams in each pool advanced to the semifinals.

==== Pool 1 ====
The United States defeated Czechoslovakia, 20 points to 12 (10–6). Italy also defeated Czechoslovakia, with the match stopped when Italy reached 17 points as it was then clear that Czechoslovakia was eliminated and the other two teams advanced.

Rank	Country	Points	MW	ML	BW	BL	BT	Notes
1	Italy	2	1	0	8	3	1	Q
2	United States	2	1	0	10	6	0	Q
3	Czechoslovakia	0	0	2	9	18	1	

==== Pool 2 ====
Sweden and Egypt were from the same first-round pool, but had not played each other yet. Both of those teams won their first matches, over the Netherlands and Germany, respectively (with Egypt winning on touches received 34–36 in a very close match). Both teams then lost their second matches, with the Sweden–Germany match also very close (Germany winning this time, 17 points to 15 in an 8–7–1 result). This left all four teams at 1–1, with the Sweden–Egypt and Netherlands–Germany matches both being winner-advances. Egypt was unable to win a single bout, with Sweden prevailing at 8–0–1; Germany defeated Netherlands with 9 wins in the first 13 bouts.

Rank	Country	Points	MW	ML	BW	BL	BT	Notes
1	Sweden	4	2	1	24	15	2	Q
2	Germany	4	2	1	25	19	1	Q
3	Netherlands	2	1	2	22	22	1	
4	Egypt	2	1	2	12	27	2	

==== Pool 3 ====
Belgium and Argentina advanced from the same first-round pool, but had not yet faced each other. They did so in the first match of this round, with Belgium prevailing on touches received (34–35) after the individual bouts were 8–8. Argentina then lost to Portugal, with the match stopped when Portugal reached 18 points (9–5).

Rank	Country	Points	MW	ML	BW	BL	BT	Notes
1	Portugal	2	1	1	9	5	0	Q
2	Belgium	2	1	0	8	8	0	Q
3	Argentina	2	1	0	13	17	0	

==== Pool 4 ====
The Poland–Canada match came down to touches received after the bouts were 8–8, which Poland won 35–36. France defeated Great Britain 19 points to 13 (9–6–1). The victors in the first matches also won the second matches, with Poland beating Great Britain 18 points to 8 (13 bouts, 8–3–2) and France prevailing over Canada 26 points to 6 (13–3).

Rank	Country	Points	MW	ML	BW	BL	BT	Notes
1	France	4	2	0	22	9	1	Q
2	Poland	4	2	0	16	11	2	Q
3	Great Britain	0	0	2	9	17	3	
4	Canada	0	0	2	11	21	0	

=== Semifinals ===
The top two teams in each pool advanced to the final.

==== Semifinal 1 ====
France and Poland advanced from the same second-round pool, but had not faced each other. France beat Germany and Belgium beat Poland in the first pair of matches. Germany defeated Belgium while France beat Poland in the second pair, putting France at 2–0, Germany and Belgium at 1–1, and Poland at 0–2. Poland's best hope was for a three-way tie for second at 1–2, but was unable to defeat Germany (falling 17 points to 5). France defeated Belgium, eliminating the latter team as well.

Rank	Country	Points	MW	ML	BW	BL	BT	Notes
1	France	6	3	0	33	12	0	Q
2	Germany	4	2	1	20	21	2	Q
3	Belgium	2	1	0	25	19	1	
4	Poland	0	0	3	8	34	1	

==== Pool 2 ====
Italy and the United States were from the same second-round pool, but had not played each other yet. Italy won in the match between them in the first pairing, with Sweden prevailing over Portugal in the other first pairing. Sweden then defeated the United States and Italy beat Portugal. This left Italy and Sweden at 2–0 while Portugal and the United States were at 0–2, so the third set of matches was not played as unnecessary to determine advancement.

Rank	Country	Points	MW	ML	BW	BL	BT	Notes
1	Italy	4	2	0	20	6	0	Q
2	Sweden	4	2	0	17	14	1	Q
3	Portugal	0	0	2	9	17	0	
4	United States	0	0	2	11	20	1	

=== Final ===
France defeated Germany again, while Italy faced Sweden for the first time and won. In the second set of pairings, Sweden defeated Germany and Italy beat France. This put Italy at 2–0, Sweden and France at 1–1, and Germany at 0–2 (and out of contention for the gold medal). In the final matches, Italy bested Germany without much difficulty (17 points to 4) to give the former the gold medal and the latter fourth place. The match between Sweden and France then became a silver/bronze match. It was as close as could be, with the individual bouts finishing 8–8. Sweden just barely prevailed on touches received, however, winning 31–32 to take silver and give France bronze.

Rank	Country	Points	MW	ML	BW	BL	BT
1st place, gold medalist(s)	Italy	6	3	0	26	11	6
2nd place, silver medalist(s)	Sweden	4	2	1	21	22	5
3rd place, bronze medalist(s)	France	2	1	2	21	23	4
4	Germany	0	0	3	11	23	9
