= Fencing at the 1936 Summer Olympics – Men's épée =

Fencing at the Olympics

Men's épée at the Games of the XI Olympiad
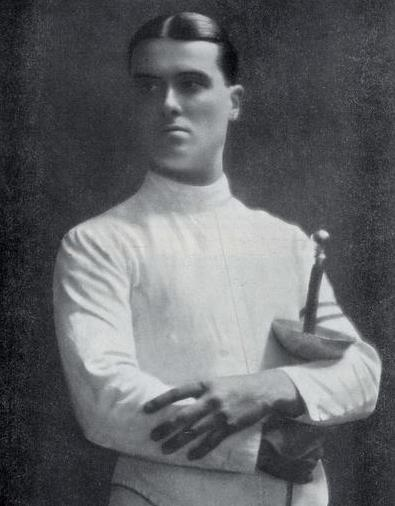
- Gold medalist Franco Riccardi (1928)
- Venue: Imperial Sports Field, Berlin
- Dates: 9–11 August 1936
- Competitors: 68 from 26 nations

Medalists
1st place, gold medalist(s)		Franco Riccardi; Italy
2nd place, silver medalist(s)		Saverio Ragno; Italy
3rd place, bronze medalist(s)		Giancarlo Cornaggia-Medici; Italy

The men's épée was one of seven fencing events on the fencing at the 1936 Summer Olympics programme. It was the ninth appearance of the event. The competition was held from 9 August 1936 to 11 August 1936. 68 fencers from 26 nations competed. Nations were limited to three fencers. The event was won by Franco Riccardi of Italy, the nation's second consecutive victory in the men's épée (matching Cuba and Belgium for second-most all-time among nations). Riccardi's teammates Saverio Ragno and Giancarlo Cornaggia-Medici took silver and bronze, respectively, to give Italy a medal sweep—Italy's first and the fourth overall in the event (Cuba in 1904, France in 1908 and 1920). Cornaggia-Medici, who had won gold in 1932, became the fourth man to win multiple medals in the individual épée. For the first time, France competed in the event but did not win any medals (snapping a four-Games podium streak).

== Background ==
This was the ninth appearance of the event, which was not held at the first Games in 1896 (with only foil and sabre events held) but has been held at every Summer Olympics since 1900.

Three of the 12 finalists from the 1932 Games returned: gold medalist Giancarlo Cornaggia-Medici of Italy, fourth-place finisher Saverio Ragno of Italy, and tenth-place finisher Raúl Saucedo of Argentina. Hans Drakenberg of Sweden was the reigning (1935) World Champion as well as European champion; Pál Dunay of Hungary had been World Champion in 1934.

Brazil, Poland, and Yugoslavia each made their debut in the event. Belgium and the United States each appeared for the eighth time, tied for most among nations.

== Competition format ==
The competition format was pool play round-robin, with bouts to three touches (unlike foil and sabre, but continuing the format from 1932). The format returned to four rounds. Not all bouts were played in some pools if not necessary to determine advancement. Two points were awarded for each bout won; if both fencers scored a hit simultaneously to make the bout 3–3, each received one point for the "null match". Ties were broken through fence-off bouts in early rounds if necessary for determining advancement, but by touches received in final rounds (and for non-advancement-necessary placement in earlier rounds).

- Round 1: 8 pools of between 7 and 10 fencers each. The top 5 fencers in each pool advanced to the quarterfinals.
- Quarterfinals: 4 pools of 10 fencers each. The top 5 fencers in each pool advanced to the semifinals.
- Semifinals: 2 pools of 10 fencers each. The top 5 fencers in each pool advanced to the final.
- Final: 1 pool of 10 fencers.

== Schedule ==
Date	Time	Round
Sunday, 9 August 1936	9:00	Round 1
Monday, 10 August 1936	9:00; 15:00	Quarterfinals; Semifinals
Tuesday, 11 August 1936	13:00	Final

== Results ==
=== Round 1 ===
The top five finishers in each pool advanced to the quarterfinals.

==== Pool 1 ====
De Beaumont is listed in 8th place and Schröder in 9th place in the official report, but Schröder had more points than de Beaumont.

Rank	Fencer	Nation	Points	Wins	Losses	Ties	TS	TR	Notes
1	Nicolae Marinescu	Romania	12	6	3	0	22	17	Q
2	Hans Drakenberg	Sweden	10	5	1	0	17	9	Q
3	Antonio Villamil	Argentina	10	5	1	0	17	10	Q
4	Béla Bay	Hungary	10	5	2	0	19	13	Q
5	Roman Kantor	Poland	10	5	4	0	21	22	Q
6	Mahmoud Abdin	Egypt	8	4	5	0	20	21	
7	Nicolaas van Hoorn	Netherlands	6	3	5	0	19	18	
8	Otto Schröder	Germany	5	2	5	1	17	21	
9	Charles de Beaumont	Great Britain	4	2	6	0	12	20	
10	Bertrand Boissonnault	Canada	3	1	6	1	8	23	

==== Pool 2 ====
Rank	Fencer	Nation	Points	Wins	Losses	Ties	TS	TR	Notes
1	Henrique de Aguilar	Brazil	12	6	0	0	18	5	Q
2	Preben Christiansen	Denmark	9	4	1	1	16	12	Q
3	Gustaf Dyrssen	Sweden	8	4	2	0	14	10	Q
4	Pál Dunay	Hungary	7	3	2	1	14	14	Q
5	Khristos Zalokostas	Greece	6	3	3	0	13	11	Q
6	Antoni Franz	Poland	5	2	4	1	15	19	
7	Robert Bergmann	Czechoslovakia	3	1	4	1	11	17	
8	Karl Hanisch	Austria	0	0	8	0	8	21	

==== Pool 3 ====
Rank	Fencer	Nation	Points	Wins	Losses	Ties	TS	TR	Notes
1	Hans Granfelt	Sweden	12	6	2	0	22	12	Q
2	Hervé, Count du Monceau de Bergendael	Belgium	12	6	2	0	20	15	Q
3	François Duret	Switzerland	10	5	2	0	18	11	Q
4	Egill Knutzen	Norway	10	5	3	0	18	14	Q
5	Marcel Boulad	Egypt	8	4	4	0	15	16	Q
6	Gustave Heiss	United States	6	3	5	0	13	20	
7	Henri Dulieux	France	4	2	5	0	14	18	
8	František Vohryzek	Czechoslovakia	4	2	5	0	12	19	
9	Douglas Dexter	Great Britain	2	1	6	0	12	19	

==== Pool 4 ====
Rank	Fencer	Nation	Points	Wins	Losses	Ties	TS	TR	Notes
1	Raymond Stasse	Belgium	12	6	1	0	19	8	Q
2	Paulo Leal	Portugal	11	5	1	1	19	11	Q
3	Ian Campbell-Gray	Great Britain	10	5	2	0	17	12	Q
4	Saverio Ragno	Italy	10	5	3	0	18	15	Q
5	Rezső von Bartha	Hungary	10	5	3	0	19	16	Q
6	Josef Kunt	Czechoslovakia	6	3	4	0	14	17	
7	Denis Dolecsko	Romania	4	2	5	0	9	16	
8	Roman Fischer	Austria	3	1	6	1	15	21	
9	Ernest Dalton	Canada	0	0	7	0	7	21	

==== Pool 5 ====
Rank	Fencer	Nation	Points	Wins	Losses	Ties	TS	TR	Notes
1	Franco Riccardi	Italy	14	7	0	0	21	8	Q
2	Siegfried Lerdon	Germany	8	4	1	0	13	6	Q
3	Aage Leidersdorff	Denmark	8	4	2	0	13	10	Q
4	Cornelis Weber	Netherlands	6	3	2	0	13	8	Q
5	Ioan Miclescu-Prăjescu	Romania	6	3	3	0	13	12	Q
6	Ricardo Romero	Chile	4	2	5	0	10	18	
7	Ivan Vladimir Mažuranić	Yugoslavia	2	1	5	0	8	16	
8	Moacyr Dunham	Brazil	0	0	6	0	5	18	

==== Pool 6 ====
Rank	Fencer	Nation	Points	Wins	Losses	Ties	TS	TR	Notes
1	Antonio Haro	Mexico	9	4	1	1	17	7	Q
2	Charles Debeur	Belgium	8	4	2	0	15	13	Q
3	Gustavo Carinhas	Portugal	6	3	2	0	11	10	Q
4	Tomas Barraza	Chile	6	3	2	0	10	12	Q
5	George Tully	Canada	5	2	3	1	14	14	Q
6	Frank Righeimer	United States	4	2	4	0	11	13	
7	Dimitar Vasilev	Bulgaria	2	1	5	0	6	15	

==== Pool 7 ====
In the three-way tie for fourth, Martínez came last to da Silveira and Guthe, with the latter two advancing.

Rank	Fencer	Nation	Points	Wins	Losses	Ties	TS	TR	Notes
1	Frédéric Fitting	Switzerland	12	6	2	0	21	12	Q
2	Willem Driebergen	Netherlands	11	5	2	1	21	15	Q
3	Giancarlo Cornaggia-Medici	Italy	11	5	2	1	22	16	Q
4	Henrique da Silveira	Portugal	10	5	3	0	19	14	Q
5	Thorstein Guthe	Norway	10	5	3	0	20	17	Q
6	José Martínez	Mexico	10	5	3	0	18	18	
7	Ennio de Oliveira	Brazil	4	2	6	0	13	19	
8	Mauris Shamil	Egypt	2	1	7	0	11	22	
9	Rudolf Weber	Austria	0	1	7	0	11	23	

==== Pool 8 ====
In the three-way tie for fourth, Martínez came last to da Silveira and Guthe, with the latter two advancing.

Rank	Fencer	Nation	Points	Wins	Losses	Ties	TS	TR	Notes
1	Frederick Weber	United States	12	6	0	0	18	8	Q
2	Michel Pécheux	France	10	5	1	0	15	9	Q
3	Jean Hauert	Switzerland	8	4	2	0	15	9	Q
4	Erik Hammer Sørensen	Denmark	7	3	3	1	15	18	Q
5	Raúl Saucedo	Argentina	6	3	4	0	16	13	Q
6	Ernst Röthig	Germany	6	2	3	2	16	17	
7	Konstantinos Bembis	Greece	2	1	6	0	7	20	
8	Krešo Tretinjak	Yugoslavia	1	0	5	1	10	18	

=== Quarterfinals ===
The top five finishers in each pool advanced to the semifinals.

==== Quarterfinal 1 ====
In the four-way tie for third place, Knutzen finished last in the play-off with Debeur, da Silveira, and Granfelt, with the latter three advancing.

Rank	Fencer	Nation	Points	Wins	Losses	Ties	TS	TR	Notes
1	Michel Pécheux	France	12	6	3	0	21	19	Q
2	Charles Debeur	Belgium	11	5	2	1	20	16	Q
3	Henrique da Silveira	Portugal	10	5	4	0	18	16	Q
4	Hans Granfelt	Sweden	10	5	4	0	21	18	Q
5	Jean Hauert	Switzerland	10	5	4	0	20	19	Q
6	Egill Knutzen	Norway	10	5	4	0	24	21	
7	Frederick Weber	United States	9	4	4	1	20	20	
8	George Tully	Canada	6	3	6	0	18	21	
9	Pál Dunay	Hungary	5	1	5	3	20	26	
10	Aage Leidersdorff	Denmark	3	1	6	1	15	21	

==== Quarterfinal 2 ====
Campbell-Gray defeated Miclescu-Prăjescu in a play-off bout to break to the tie for fifth and last advancement spot. The official report lists Weber 9th and Duret 8th, though the scoring system would put Weber in 8th with fewer touches received.

Rank	Fencer	Nation	Points	Wins	Losses	Ties	TS	TR	Notes
1	Hans Drakenberg	Sweden	15	7	1	1	26	13	Q
2	Roman Kantor	Poland	14	7	2	0	23	12	Q
3	Raymond Stasse	Belgium	14	7	2	0	23	15	Q
4	Saverio Ragno	Italy	12	6	2	0	21	12	Q
5	Ian Campbell-Gray	Great Britain	8	4	5	0	19	18	Q
6	Ioan Miclescu-Prăjescu	Romania	8	3	4	2	21	21	
7	Preben Christiansen	Denmark	4	2	6	0	7	21	
8	Cornelis Weber	Netherlands	4	1	5	2	13	22	
9	François Duret	Switzerland	4	1	6	2	17	26	
10	Thorstein Guthe	Norway	3	1	5	1	13	23	

==== Quarterfinal 3 ====
It is unclear why Villamil did not face Barraza, Driebergen did not face Leal, and Boulad did not face Bay. In general, bouts unnecessary to advancement were not played, but each of the three men eliminated in 6th through 8th place were within 2 points of the 5th-place finisher Zalokostas and could have caught him with an additional win (or even tie for Villamil), though Zalokostas himself had an unplayed bout against Hammer Sørensen and could have added to his point total.

Rank	Fencer	Nation	Points	Wins	Losses	Ties	TS	TR	Notes
1	Franco Riccardi	Italy	12	6	1	0	20	9	Q
2	Béla Bay	Hungary	11	5	2	1	21	14	Q
3	Paulo Leal	Portugal	10	5	2	0	16	11	Q
4	Frédéric Fitting	Switzerland	10	5	3	0	22	13	Q
5	Khristos Zalokostas	Greece	8	4	2	2	20	19	Q
6	Antonio Villamil	Argentina	7	3	4	1	17	17	
7	Willem Driebergen	Netherlands	6	3	5	0	14	16	
8	Marcel Boulad	Egypt	6	3	5	0	15	21	
9	Erik Hammer Sørensen	Denmark	2	1	6	0	8	19	
10	Tomas Barraza	Chile	0	0	7	0	7	21	

==== Quarterfinal 4 ====
Rank	Fencer	Nation	Points	Wins	Losses	Ties	TS	TR	Notes
1	Antonio Haro	Mexico	12	6	2	0	20	11	Q
2	Siegfried Lerdon	Germany	10	5	2	0	17	9	Q
3	Giancarlo Cornaggia-Medici	Italy	10	5	3	0	21	14	Q
4	Henrique de Aguilar	Brazil	10	5	3	0	18	14	Q
5	Hervé, Count du Monceau de Bergendael	Belgium	10	5	4	0	21	20	Q
6	Raúl Saucedo	Argentina	6	3	5	0	15	19	
6	Gustavo Carinhas	Portugal	6	3	5	0	14	19	
6	Rezső von Bartha	Hungary	6	3	5	0	12	19	
9	Nicolae Marinescu	Romania	6	3	5	0	12	21	
10	Gustaf Dyrssen	Sweden	4	2	6	0	15	19	

=== Semifinals ===
The top five finishers in each pool advanced to the semifinals.

==== Semifinal 1 ====
In the four-way tie for third place, Pécheux finished last in the play-off with Debeur, Zalokostas, and Cornaggia-Medici, with the latter three advancing.

Rank	Fencer	Nation	Points	Wins	Losses	Ties	TS	TR	Notes
1	Ian Campbell-Gray	Great Britain	18	9	0	0	27	9	Q
2	Saverio Ragno	Italy	12	6	3	0	20	20	Q
3	Giancarlo Cornaggia-Medici	Italy	10	5	4	0	19	13	Q
4	Khristos Zalokostas	Greece	10	5	4	0	19	19	Q
5	Charles Debeur	Belgium	10	5	4	0	23	22	Q
6	Michel Pécheux	France	10	5	4	0	23	19	
7	Hans Granfelt	Sweden	8	4	5	0	20	21	
8	Antonio Haro	Mexico	5	2	6	1	15	24	
9	Paulo Leal	Portugal	5	2	6	1	15	25	
10	Jean Hauert	Switzerland	2	1	8	0	15	26	

==== Semifinal 2 ====
In the four-way tie for fifth place, Drakenberg won the play-off pool against Kantor, Fitting, and Lerdon.

Rank	Fencer	Nation	Points	Wins	Losses	Ties	TS	TR	Notes
1	Raymond Stasse	Belgium	15	7	1	1	26	13	Q
2	Franco Riccardi	Italy	13	6	1	1	23	13	Q
3	Henrique da Silveira	Portugal	10	5	3	0	18	11	Q
4	Béla Bay	Hungary	10	5	4	0	20	16	Q
5	Hans Drakenberg	Sweden	8	3	4	2	19	22	Q
6	Roman Kantor	Poland	8	4	5	0	17	22	
7	Frédéric Fitting	Switzerland	8	4	5	0	19	23	
7	Siegfried Lerdon	Germany	8	3	4	2	20	23	
9	Hervé, Count du Monceau de Bergendael	Belgium	4	2	7	0	15	22	
10	Henrique de Aguilar	Brazil	4	2	7	0	13	25	

=== Final ===
The Italian fencers swept the medals. Ties in the final were broken by touches received, including Ragno taking silver to Cornaggia-Medici's bronze by a touches received score of 15–16 (Ragno had beaten Cornaggia-Medici head-to-head in the final after losing to him in the semifinal). Riccardi beat both of his countrymen in their bouts, ultimately taking gold with 1 point more than either despite winning 1 fewer bout due to his 3 ties.

Rank	Fencer	Nation	Points	Wins	Losses	Ties	TS	TR
1st place, gold medalist(s)	Franco Riccardi	Italy	13	5	1	3	25	18
2nd place, silver medalist(s)	Saverio Ragno	Italy	12	6	3	0	24	15
3rd place, bronze medalist(s)	Giancarlo Cornaggia-Medici	Italy	12	6	3	0	22	16
4	Hans Drakenberg	Sweden	10	4	3	2	20	20
5	Charles Debeur	Belgium	9	4	4	1	21	21
6	Henrique da Silveira	Portugal	8	4	5	0	18	19
7	Raymond Stasse	Belgium	8	3	4	2	21	21
8	Ian Campbell-Gray	Great Britain	8	3	4	2	18	24
9	Béla Bay	Hungary	7	3	5	1	18	22
10	Khristos Zalokostas	Greece	3	1	7	1	15	26
