= Austria at the 1936 Summer Olympics =

- IOC code: AUT
- NOC: Austrian Olympic Committee

in Berlin
- Competitors: 234 (217 men and 17 women) in 19 sports
- Flag bearer: Friedrich Wurmböck
- Medals Ranked 11th: Gold 4 Silver 6 Bronze 3 Total 13

Summer Olympics appearances (overview)
- 1896; 1900; 1904; 1908; 1912; 1920; 1924; 1928; 1932; 1936; 1948; 1952; 1956; 1960; 1964; 1968; 1972; 1976; 1980; 1984; 1988; 1992; 1996; 2000; 2004; 2008; 2012; 2016; 2020; 2024

Other related appearances
- 1906 Intercalated Games

Austria competed at the 1936 Summer Olympics in Berlin, Germany. 234 competitors, 217 men and 17 women, took part in 105 events in 19 sports.

== Medalists ==
Medal	Name	Sport	Event
Gold	Gregor Hradetzky	Canoeing	Men's Folding K-1 10000m
Gold	Gregor Hradetzky	Canoeing	Men's K-1 1000m
Gold	Adolf Kainz; Alfons Dorfner	Canoeing	Men's K-2 1000m
Gold	Robert Fein	Weightlifting	Men's Lightweight
Silver	Fritz Landertinger	Canoeing	Men's K-1 10000m
Silver	Rupert Weinstabl; Karl Proisl	Canoeing	Men's C-2 1000m
Silver	Viktor Kalisch; Karl Steinhuber	Canoeing	Men's K-2 10000m
Silver	Men's Football Squad	Football	Men's Football Competition
Silver	Men's Handball Squad	Handball	Men's Handball Competition
Silver	Josef Hasenöhrl	Rowing	Men's Single Sculls
Bronze	Rupert Weinstabl; Karl Proisl	Canoeing	Men's C-2 10000m
Bronze	Alois Podhajsky	Equestrian	Individual Dressage
Bronze	Ellen Preis	Fencing	Women's Individual Foil

== Athletics ==
Key

- Note–Ranks given for track events are within the athlete's heat only
- Q = Qualified for the next round

Men
Track & road events

Athlete	Event	Heat		Quarterfinal		Semifinal		Final	
Athlete	Event	Result	Rank	Result	Rank	Result	Rank	Result	Rank
Robert Struckl	100 m	Unknown	4	Did not advance					
Felix Rinner	200 m	22.4	3 Q	Unknown	5	Did not advance			
Alfred König	200 m	Unknown	6	Did not advance					
Johann Baptist Gudenus	400 m	52.9	5	Did not advance					
Alfred König	400 m	49.4	4	Did not advance					
Emil Hübscher	800 m	1:57.3	4 Q	—N/a		Unknown	7	Did not advance	
Franz Eichberger	800 m	1:56.3	3 Q	—N/a		1:56.2	6	Did not advance	
Emil Hübscher	1500 m	—N/a				Unknown	8	Did not advance	
Franz Eichberger	1500 m	—N/a				3:59.2	6	Did not advance	
Friedrich Fischer	5000 m	Unknown	11	—N/a				Did not advance	
Rudolf Wöber	10,000 m	—N/a						32:22.0	15
Johann Langmayr	110 m hurdles	15.1	3	—N/a		Did not advance			
Ernst Leitner	110 m hurdles	15.3	3	—N/a		Did not advance			
Ernst Leitner	400 m hurdles	54.9	3	—N/a		Did not advance			
Ladislaus Simacek	3000 m steeple	Unknown	9	—N/a				Did not advance	
Franz Tuschek	Marathon	—N/a						2:46:29.0	14
Rudolf Wöber	Marathon	—N/a						2:51:28.0	22
Wilhelm Rothmayer	Marathon	—N/a						3:02:32.0	32

Field events

Athlete	Event	Qualification		Final	
Athlete	Event	Result	Rank	Result	Rank
Karl Kotratschek	Triple jump	Unknown	Q	13.15	23
Fritz Flachberger	High jump	1.80	23	Did not advance	
Fritz Neuruhrer	High jump	1.70	32	Did not advance	
Alfred Proksch	Pole vault	3.80	1 Q	4.00	6
Josef Haunzwickel	Pole vault	3.80	1 Q	4.00	6
Johann Wotapek	Discus throw	45.00	6 Q	46.05	9
Emil Janausch	Discus throw	Unknown	13–31	Did not advance	
Emil Janausch	Hammer throw	<46.00	18–27	Did not advance	

Combined events – Decathlon

Athlete	Event	100 m	LJ	SP	HJ	400 m	110H	DT	PV	JT	1500 m	Final	Rank
Franz Sterzl	Result	11.7	6.52	10.98	1.75	53.3	16.5	35.33	3.20	NM	—N/a	DNF	
Franz Sterzl	Points	662	681	530	727	701	710	578	575		—N/a	DNF	

Women
Track & road events

Athlete	Event	Heat		Semifinal		Final	
Athlete	Event	Result	Rank	Result	Rank	Result	Rank
Johanna Vancura	100 m	12.5	2 Q	Unknown	6	Did not advance	
Grete Neumann	100 m	12.9	3	Did not advance			
Charlotte Machmer	100 m	Unknown	4	Did not advance			
Mathilde Puchberger	80 m hurdles	Unknown	4	Did not advance			
Veronika Kohlbach	80 m hurdles	Unknown	5	Did not advance			
Charlotte Machmer	80 m hurdles	Unknown	6	Did not advance			
Charlotte Machmer; Johanna Vancura; Grete Neumann; Veronika Kohlbach	4 × 100 m relay	49.9	4	—N/a		Did not advance	

Field events

Athlete	Event	Qualification		Final	
Athlete	Event	Result	Rank	Result	Rank
Wanda Nowak	High jump	—N/a		1.50	9
Margarethe Held	Discus throw	—N/a		34.05	11
Veronika Kohlbach	Discus throw	—N/a		34.00	13
Herma Bauma	Javelin throw	—N/a		41.66	4

== Cycling ==
Ten cyclist, all male, represented Austria in 1936.

Individual road race

- Virgilius Altmann
- Hans Höfner
- Eugen Schnalek
- Karl Kühn

Team road race

- Virgilius Altmann
- Hans Höfner
- Eugen Schnalek
- Karl Kühn

Sprint

- Franz Dusika

Time trial

- Alfred Mohr

Tandem

- Franz Dusika
- Alfred Mohr

Team pursuit

- Josef Genschieder
- Josef Moser
- Karl Schmaderer
- Karl Wölfl

== Diving ==
Men

Athlete	Event	Final	
Athlete	Event	Points	Rank
Karl Steiner	3 m springboard	109.54	17

Women

Athlete	Event	Final	
Athlete	Event	Points	Rank
Magdalene Epply-Staudinger	3 m springboard	65.76	12
Magdalene Epply-Staudinger	10 m platform	25.04	21
Therese Rampel	10 m platform	27.16	16

== Fencing ==
15 fencers, 12 men and 3 women, represented Austria in 1936.

Men's foil

- Josef Losert
- Karl Sudrich
- Josef Ritz

Men's team foil

- Hans Lion, Roman Fischer, Hans Schönbaumsfeld, Ernst Baylon, Josef Losert, Karl Sudrich

Men's épée

- Karl Hanisch
- Roman Fischer
- Rudolf Weber

Men's team épée

- Karl Hanisch, Hans Schönbaumsfeld, Roman Fischer, Hugo Weczerek, Rudolf Weber

Men's sabre

- Josef Losert
- Hubert Loisel
- Karl Sudrich

Men's team sabre

- Josef Losert, Hugo Weczerek, Karl Sudrich, Hubert Loisel, Karl Hanisch, Karl Kaschka

Women's foil

- Ellen Müller-Preis
- Elisabeth Grasser
- Friedrieke Wenisch-Filz

== Football ==
5 August 1936 Round of 16	Austria	3–1	Egypt	Berlin
17:30	Steinmetz 4', 65'; Laudon 7'	Report	Sakr 85'	Stadium: Mommsenstadion; Attendance: 6,000; Referee: Arthur James Jewell (England)

8 August 1936 Quarterfinals	Peru	4–2 (a.e.t.)	Austria	Berlin
17:30	Alcalde 75'; Villanueva 81', 117'; Fernández 119'	Report	Wergin 23'; Steinmetz 37'	Stadium: Hertha-BSC Field; Attendance: 5,000; Referee: Thoralf Kristiansen (Norway)
Note: The match was suspended on extra time due to pitch invasion. FIFA scheduled a replay match on closed grounds.

11 August 1936 Quarterfinals Replay	Peru	Walkover	Austria	Berlin
				Stadium: Hertha-BSC Field
Note: Peru refused to play the match and forfeited the tournament.

11 August 1936 Semifinals	Poland	1–3	Austria	Berlin
17:00	Gad 73'	Report	Kainberger 14'; Laudon 55'; Mandl 88'	Stadium: Olympiastadion; Attendance: 82,000; Referee: Arthur W. Barton (England)

15 August 1936 Gold Medal Match	Italy	2–1 (a.e.t.)	Austria	Berlin
16:00	Frossi 70', 92'	Report	Kainberger 79'	Stadium: Olympiastadion; Attendance: 85,000; Referee: Peco Bauwens (Germany)

=== Men's team competition ===
- Eduard Kainberger
- Josef Lagofsky
- Martin Kargl
- Ernst Kuenz
- Anton Krenn
- Karl Wahlmueller
- Max Hofmeister
- Walter Werginz
- Adolf Laudon
- Klement Steinmetz
- Josef Kitzmueller
- Franz Fuchsberger
- Franz Mandl
- Karl Kainberger
- Josef Ksander
- Ernst Bacher
- Alois Homschak
- Anton Kleindienst
- Leo Schaffelhofer
- Karl Schreiber

== Modern pentathlon ==
Two male pentathletes represented Austria in 1936.

- Karl Leban
- Alfred Guth

== Rowing ==
Austria had nine rowers participate in four out of seven rowing events in 1936.

Men's single sculls

- Josef Hasenöhrl

Men's double sculls

- Fritz Moser
- Hermann Kubik

Men's coxless pair

- Heinz Gattringer
- Max Colli

Men's coxless four

- Rudolf Höpfler
- Camillo Winkler
- Wilhelm Pichler
- Hans Binder

== Sailing ==
Open

Athlete	Event	Race							Net points	Final rank
Athlete	Event	1	2	3	4	5	6	7	Net points	Final rank
Dietz Angerer	O-Jolle	8	17	~~DSQ~~	12	5	DSQ	2	86	15

== Shooting ==
Three shooters represented Austria in 1936.

Men

Athlete	Event	Final	
Athlete	Event	Score	Rank
Alfred Hämmerle	50 m rifle, prone	281	61
Theodor Janisch	50 m rifle, prone	291	32
Alois Navratil	50 m rifle, prone	289	40

== Swimming ==
Ranks given are within the heat.

Men

Athlete	Event	Heat		Semifinal		Final	
Athlete	Event	Time	Rank	Time	Rank	Time	Rank
Günther Zobernig	100 m freestyle	1:03.9	6	Did not advance			
Edmund Pader	400 m freestyle	5:16.9	5	Did not advance			
Franz Seltenheim	400 m freestyle	5:38.3	7	Did not advance			
Edmund Pader	1500 m freestyle	21:13.9	4	Did not advance			
Herbert Hnatek; Franz Seltenheim; Edmund Pader; Günther Zobernig	4 × 200 m freestyle relay	—N/a		10:58.4	5	Did not advance	

Women

Athlete	Event	Heat		Semifinal		Final	
Athlete	Event	Time	Rank	Time	Rank	Time	Rank
Roma Wagner	100 m backstroke	1:28.4	7	Did not advance			
Roma Wagner; Franziska Mally; Grete Ittlinger; Elli von Kropiwnicki	4 × 100 m freestyle relay	—N/a		5:16.6	5	Did not advance	
