= Czechoslovakia at the 1936 Summer Olympics =

- IOC code: TCH
- NOC: Czechoslovak Olympic Committee

in Berlin
- Competitors: 190 in 17 sports
- Flag bearer: Josef Klapuch
- Medals Ranked 12th: Gold 3 Silver 5 Bronze 0 Total 8

Summer Olympics appearances (overview)
- 1920; 1924; 1928; 1932; 1936; 1948; 1952; 1956; 1960; 1964; 1968; 1972; 1976; 1980; 1984; 1988; 1992

Other related appearances
- Bohemia (1900–1912); Czech Republic (1994–pres.); Slovakia (1994–pres.)

Czechoslovakia competed at the 1936 Summer Olympics in Berlin, Germany. 190 competitors, 175 men and 15 women, took part in 102 events in 17 sports.

== Medalists ==
Medal	Name	Sport	Event
Gold	Jan Brzák-Felix; Vladimír Syrovátka	Canoeing	Men's C-2 1000 m
Gold	Václav Mottl; Zdeněk Škrland	Canoeing	Men's C-2 10000 m
Gold	Alois Hudec	Gymnastics	Men's rings
Silver	Bohuslav Karlík	Canoeing	Men's C-1 1000 m
Silver	Jaroslava Bajerová; Vlasta Děkanová; Božena Dobešová; Vlasta Foltová; Anna Hřebřinová; Matylda Pálfyová; Zdeňka Veřmiřovská; Marie Větrovská	Gymnastics	Women's team all-around
Silver	Václav Pšenička	Weightlifting	Men's heavyweight
Silver	Jozef Herda	Wrestling	Men's Greco-Roman lightweight
Silver	Josef Klapuch	Wrestling	Men's freestyle heavyweight

== Athletics ==
Men:

- 400 metres – Karel Kněnický (6th place in heat 4, round 2 of 4)
- 800 metres – Evžen Rošický (5th place in heat 4, round 1 of 3); Stanislav Otáhal (7th place in heat 3, round 1 of 3)
- 1500 metres – Bedřich Hošek (5th place in heat 3, round 1 of 2)
- 10,000 metres – Ludvík Bombík (17th place)
- Marathon – Miloslav Luňák (19th place); Ján Takáč (21st place); Josef Šulc (38th place)
- 110 metres hurdles – Ludvík Kománek (5th place in heat 3, round 1 of 3)
- 400 metres hurdles – Ernst Berndt (4th place in heat 6, round 1 of 3)
- 3000 metres steeplechase – Bedřich Hošek (7th place in heat 1, round 1 of 2); Václav Hošek (8th place in heat 2, round 1 of 2); Josef Hušek (8th place, round 1 of 2)
- 4 × 100 metres relay – Czechoslovakia did not start

Ladislav Fišer, Jan Hanč, Rudolf Huml, Jiří Juranka, Karel Kněnický, Břetislav Krátký

- 4 × 400 metres relay – Czechoslovakia (5th place in heat 3, round 1 of 2)

Heinz Lorenz, Evžen Rošický, Břetislav Krátký, Karel Kněnický, Ernst Berndt (did not start), Ladislav Fišer (did not start)

- 50 kilometres walk – Jaroslav Štork (4th place); Václav Balšán (did not start); František Jirásek (did not start)
- High jump – Břetislav Krátký (=32nd place, round 1 of 2); Zdeněk Sobotka (=32nd place, round 1of 2), Vladimír Galanda (did not start)
- Pole vault – Jan Korejs (=6th place), Miroslav Klásek (=17th place)
- Long jump – Josef Vosolsobě (13th place), Jiří Hoffmann (not placed, round 1 of 2), Rudolf Polame (not placed, round 1 of 2)
- Shot put – František Douda (7th place), Karel Hoplíček (15th place), Miroslav Vítek (not placed, round 1 of 2)
- Discus throw – Miroslav Vítek (not placed, round 1 of 2), Valér Barač (not placed, round 1 of 2), Július Viktorý (did not start)
- Hammer throw – Jaroslav Eliáš (not placed, round 1 of 2), Jaroslav Knotek (not placed, round 1 of 2)
- Javelin throw – Josef Klein (=22nd place, round 1 of 2), Pavol Mal'a (=26th place, round 1 of 2)
- Decathlon – Josef Klein (16th place)

Women:

- Discus throw – Margaréta Schieferová (12th place)
- Javelin throw – Štefánie Pekarová (did not start)

== Canoeing ==
13 male canoeists represented Czechoslovakia.

Men's C-1 1,000 metres
Bohuslav Karlík Silver

Men's C-2 1,000 metres
Vladimír Syrovátka, Jan Brzák-Felix Gold

Men's C-2 10,000 metres
Václav Mottl, Zdeněk Škrland Gold

Men's K-1 1,000 metres
Emil Šmatlák (7th place, heat 1)

Men's K-1 10,000 metres
František Brzák (6th place)

Men's folding K-1 10,000 metres
František Svoboda (5th place)

Men's K-2 1,000 metres
František Brzák, Josef Dusil (4th place)

Men's K-2 10,000 metres
Zdeněk Černický, Jaroslav Humpál (8th place)

Men's folding K-2 10,000 metres
Otakar Kouba, Ludvík Klíma (5th place)

== Cycling ==
Five cyclists, all men, represented Czechoslovakia in 1936.

Individual road race

- Josef Lošek
- Vilém Jakl
- Miroslav Jung
- Hans Leutelt
- Miloslav Loos

Team road race

- Josef Lošek
- Vilém Jakl
- Miroslav Jung
- Hans Leutelt
- Miloslav Loos

== Diving ==
Men

Athlete	Event	Final	
Athlete	Event	Points	Rank
František Leikert	3 m springboard	131.98	9
Josef Nesvadba	3 m springboard	111.44	=15
Václav Kacl	10 m platform	80.04	19
František Leikert	10 m platform	86.72	16
Josef Nesvadba	10 m platform	60.02	26

== Fencing ==
13 fencers, 11 men and 2 women, represented Czechoslovakia in 1936.

Men's foil

- Jiří Jesenský
- Bohuslav Kirchmann
- Hervarth Frass von Friedenfeldt

Men's team foil

- Hervarth Frass von Friedenfeldt, František Vohryzek, Jiří Jesenský, Bohuslav Kirchmann, Josef Hildebrand

Men's épée

- Josef Kunt
- Robert Bergmann
- František Vohryzek

Men's team épée

- Robert Bergmann, František Vohryzek, Bohuslav Kirchmann, Josef Kunt, Alfred Klausnitzer, Václav Rais

Men's sabre

- Jozef Benedik
- Hervarth Frass von Friedenfeldt
- Bohuslav Kirchmann

Men's team sabre

- Josef Jungmann, Jozef Benedik, Hervarth Frass von Friedenfeldt, Bohuslav Kirchmann, Josef Hildebrand

Women's foil

- Marie Šedivá
- Carmen Raisová

== Rowing ==
Czechoslovakia had 17 rowers participate in four out of seven rowing events in 1936.

Men's single sculls

- Jiří Zavřel

Men's double sculls

- Vladimír Vaina
- Josef Straka

Men's coxed four

- František Maloň
- Alfred Lerbretier
- Jan Matoušek
- Jaroslav Mysliveček
- Josef Jabor (cox)

Men's eight

- Karel Brandstätter
- Pavel Parák
- Jan Holobrádek
- Ladislav Smolík
- František Kšír
- František Kobzík
- Rudolf Baránek
- Antonín Hrstka
- Bedřich Procházka (cox)

== Shooting ==
Seven shooters represented Czechoslovakia in 1936.

25 m rapid fire pistol

- Jan Gasche
- František Pokorný
- Josef Kopecký

50 m pistol

- Václav Krecl
- Jan Koller

50 m rifle, prone

- František Čermák
- Jaroslav Mach
- František Pokorný

== Swimming ==
Eric Lansky

Ranks given are within the heat.

Men

Athlete	Event	Heat		Semifinal		Final	
Athlete	Event	Time	Rank	Time	Rank	Time	Rank
Felix Erbert	200 m breaststroke	2:55.7	3 Q	2.53.5	7	Did not advance	

Women

Athlete	Event	Heat		Semifinal		Final	
Athlete	Event	Time	Rank	Time	Rank	Time	Rank
Irma Schrameková	100 m freestyle	1:11.8	4	Did not advance			
Irma Schrameková	400 m freestyle	5:47.5	2 Q	5:46.0	5	Did not advance	
Eliška Boubelová	200 m breaststroke	3:25.8	5	Did not advance			
