= Romania at the 1936 Summer Olympics =

- IOC code: ROU
- NOC: Romanian Olympic Committee

in Berlin
- Competitors: 54 in 9 sports
- Flag bearer: Șerban Manciulescu
- Medals Ranked 25th: Gold 0 Silver 1 Bronze 0 Total 1

Summer Olympics appearances (overview)
- 1900; 1904–1920; 1924; 1928; 1932; 1936; 1948; 1952; 1956; 1960; 1964; 1968; 1972; 1976; 1980; 1984; 1988; 1992; 1996; 2000; 2004; 2008; 2012; 2016; 2020; 2024

Romania competed at the 1936 Summer Olympics in Berlin, Germany. The nation returned to the Olympic Games after having missed the 1932 Summer Olympics. 54 competitors, 52 men and 2 women, took part in 33 events in 9 sports.

== Medalists ==
Medal	Person	Event	Date
Silver			

Medals by sport
Sport	1st place, gold medalist(s)	2nd place, silver medalist(s)	3rd place, bronze medalist(s)	Total
Equestrian				
Total	0	1	0	1

Medals by gender
Gender	1st place, gold medalist(s)	2nd place, silver medalist(s)	3rd place, bronze medalist(s)	Total
Male				
Female				
Total	0	1	0	1

=== Silver ===
- Henri Rang — Equestrian, Jumping Individual

== Athletics ==
Men's Long Jump

- Bogdan Ionescu-Crum — did not qualify → no ranking

Men's Discus Throw

- Ioan Havaleţ — did not qualify → no ranking

50 km Walk

- Gheorghe Firea — 5:09:39 → 20th place

== Boxing ==
Flyweight

- Dumitru Panaitescu — lost to Nunag (Philippines) → no ranking

Bantamweight

- Ioan Gaşpar — lost to Stasch (Germany) → no ranking

Featherweight

- Nicolae Berechet — lost to Seeberg (Estonia) → no ranking

Lightweight

- Gheorghe David — lost to Facchin (Italy) → no ranking

== Equestrian ==
Grand Prix des Nations Show Jumping Event, individual

- Henri Rang — on "Delfis" 4 penalty points in 144,2 seconds (→ Silver Medal)
- Ion Apostol — on "Dracu Ştie" 28 penalty points in 191 seconds (→ 29th place)
- Toma Tudoran — on "Hunter" — DNF → no ranking

Grand Prix des Nations Show Jumping Event, Team

- Team roster: Henri Rang on "Delfis", Ion Apostol on ""Dracu Ştie", Toma Tudoran on "Hunter"
- Romania disqualified, because of Tudoran not finishing the course (→ no ranking)

== Fencing ==
Seven fencers, five men and two women, represented Romania in 1936.

Men's épée

- Nicolae Marinescu — qualified from the 1st round (4 v,1 d), eliminated in 2nd round (2 v, 4 d)
- Denis Dolecsko — eliminated in the 1st round (1 v, 4 d)
- Ioan Miclescu-Prăjescu — qualified from the 1st round (4v, 2 d), eliminated in the 2nd round (3v,2 d, lost barrage to Campbell-Gray, Great Britain)

Men's sabre

- Denis Dolecsko — qualified from the 1st round (4 v, 1 d), eliminated in 2nd round (1 v, 4 d)
- Nicolae Marinescu — qualified from the first round (4 v, 2 d), eliminated in 2nd round (0 v, 5 d)
- Kamilló Szathmáry — eliminated in the 1st round (3v, 3d, lost barrage to Harry, Great Britain)

Men's team sabre

- Team roster: Nicolae Marinescu, Gheorghe Man, Denis Dolecsko, Kamilló Szathmáry.
- Romania eliminated in 1st round:
- lost to Germany (6-10)
- lost to Uruguay (8-8, 57-60 td)

Women's foil

- Thea Kellner — eliminated in Pool Stage (0 v, 5 d)
- Gerda Gantz — eliminated in Pool Stage (1 v, 5 d)

== Gymnastics ==
Men's team

- Team roster:Drăghici, Matuşek, Ludu, Abraham, Dan, Schmidt, Albert, Moldoveanu.
- Romania — 71.566 p. (→ 14th place)

Individual all-around

- Ludu — 11.966 p. (→ 93rd place)
- Abraham — 10.093 p. (→ 98th place)
- Albert — 9.900 p. (→ 99th place)
- Matuşek — 9.050 p. (→ 101st place)
- Dan — 9.037 p. (→ 103rd place)
- Drăghici — 8.500 p. (→ 105th place)
- Schmidt — 8.370 p. (→ 107th place)
- Moldoveanu — did not complete the all-around competition (→ no ranking)

== Handball ==
- Team roster: Fesci, Zoller, Carl Haffer, Franz Haffer, Zickeli, Höchsmann, Speck, Zacharias, Kirschner, Halmen, Halder, Hermannstädter, Schorsten, Holzträger, Herzog.
- Lost to Austria (3-18)
- Lost to Switzerland (6-8)
- Defeated U.S.A. (10-3) (→ Fifth place)

== Shooting ==
Four shooters represented Romania in 1936.

50 m pistol

- Vasile Crişan

50 m rifle, prone

- Mihai Ionescu-Călineşti
- Gheorghe Mirea
- Eduard Grand

== Wrestling ==
Bantamweight

- József Tõzsér — defeated Bayle (France) (throw 11:58), defeated Tóth (Yugoslavia) (decision 3-0), defeated Bertoli (Italy) (throw 2:50, lost to Brendel (Germany) (throw 16:24), lost to Perttunen (Finland) (decision 2-1) (→ Fifth place)

Featherweight

- Dezsõ Horváth — lost to Hering (Germany) (throw 11:36), defeated Janda (Czechoslovakia) (decision 3-0), defeated Kracher (France) (throw 6:28), lost to Reini (Finland) (throw 5:28) (→no ranking)

Lightweight

- Ilie Borlovan — defeated Kálmán (Hungary) (decision 2-1), defeated Arikan (Turkey) (decision 2-1), lost to Koskela (Finland)(throw 8:51) (→no ranking)

Middleweight

- Marin Cocoş — defeated Gogel (Switzerland) (throw 5:30), lost to Schweikert (Germany) (throw 8:28), defeated Pointner (Austria)(throw 2:21), lost to Kokkinen (Finland) (throw 3:00) (→ Fifth place)

Heavyweight

- Tibor Kondorossy — lost to Nyman (Sweden) (throw 6:51), lost to Palusalu (Estonia) (throw 10:36 ) (→no ranking)
