= Jozef Benedik =

Slovak fencer (1898–1977)

Personal information
- Nationality: Czechoslovak
- Born: 10 March 1898 Veselí nad Moravou, Austria-Hungary
- Died: 11 October 1977 (aged 79) Nitra, Czechoslovakia

Sport
- Country: Czechoslovakia
- Sport: Fencing
- Event: Sabre
- Club: ŠOD Levoča
Medal record
Representing (Slovakia) Slovak krajina
Czechoslovak Fencing Championships
Gold medal – first place	1929 Prague	Sabre
Gold medal – first place	1930 Prague	Sabre
Silver medal – second place	1935 Prague	Sabre
Bronze medal – third place	1934 Prague	Sabre
Bronze medal – third place	1936 Prague	Sabre

Jozef Benedik (10 March 1898 – 11 October 1977) was a Czechoslovak fencer. He competed in the individual and team sabre events at the 1936 Summer Olympics.

== Biography ==
He was born in Moravia and, as a young soldier of the Austro-Hungarian Army, graduated from a cadet school in Kraków. He later came as a captain of the Czechoslovak army to serve in Levoča, Slovakia.

He soon became a stable and inseparable part of the ŠOD Levoča club. He became a two-time champion of Czechoslovakia in the sabre in 1929 and 1930. In the following years he was a regular participant and finalist of the Czechoslovak Championships.

His biggest rivals in the sabre at many championships, including the republican ones, were another Slovak Tibor Klein, from the competing club KAC Košice and Josef Jungmann from Bohemia.

He was part of the Czechoslovak team, At the Olympic Games in Berlin, a team consisting of Jungmann, Benedik, von Friedenfeldt, Kirchmann and Hildebrand ended up in the second round in the team competition in the sabre. He also fenced the individual competition in the sabre, but like the Czechoslovak team, he was eliminated in the 2nd round.

In 1939, he acquired Slovak citizenship. In the years 1939-1944, during the First Slovak Republic, he was the chairman of the Slovak Fencing Association (In Slovak: Slovenský šermovnícky zväz).

As an officer of the Slovak Army, he took part in the war with Poland during the Second World War and also in the war against Soviet Union, for which he was also awarded. After the war, he was promoted to colonel of the restored Czechoslovak Army (1947), but retired two years later in 1949. Later he lived in Nitra and trained young Slovak fencers.

== International competitions ==
Year	Competition	Venue	Position	Event	Notes
Representing Czechoslovakia
1936	Olympic Games	Berlin, Germany	23rd	Sabre	Men
1936	Olympic Games	Berlin, Germany	11th	Sabre team	Men

== National titles ==
Czechoslovak Fencing Championships:

- 1929 Prague: (gold) (Sabre)
- 1930 Prague: (gold) (Sabre)
- 1934 Prague: (bronze) (Sabre)
- 1935 Prague: (silver) (Sabre)
- 1936 Prague: (bronze) (Sabre)

Dr. Gádor Memorial:

- 1929 Košice: 4th (Sabre)

Dr. Heil Cup

- 1929 Košice: (silver) (Team)

Tatra Fencing Tournament:

- 1929 Piešťany: (silver) (Sabre)
