= Shooting at the 1936 Summer Olympics – Men's 25 metre rapid fire pistol =

Olympic shooting event

Men's 25 metre rapid fire pistol at the Games of the XI Olympiad
- Shooting pictogram
- Venue: Wannsee Shooting Range
- Date: 6 August
- Competitors: 53 from 22 nations
- Winning score: 36

Medalists
| 1st place, gold medalist(s) | | Cornelius van Oyen; Germany |
| 2nd place, silver medalist(s) | | Heinrich Hax; Germany |
| 3rd place, bronze medalist(s) | | Torsten Ullman; Sweden |

The men's ISSF 25 meter rapid fire pistol was a shooting sports event held as part of the Shooting at the 1936 Summer Olympics programme. It was the seventh appearance of the event. The competition was held on 6 August 1936 at the shooting ranges at Wannsee. 53 shooters from 22 nations competed. Nations were limited to three shooters each, as they had been since the 1932 Games. The top two places were taken by the hosts, as Germans Cornelius van Oyen and Heinrich Hax won gold and silver, respectively. Hax was the first man to earn multiple medals in the event, repeating his silver performance from 1932. Torsten Ullman of Sweden earned bronze.

== Background ==
This was the seventh appearance of what would become standardised as the men's ISSF 25 meter rapid fire pistol event, the only event on the 2020 programme that traces back to 1896. The event has been held at every Summer Olympics except 1904 and 1928 (when no shooting events were held) and 1908; it was open to women from 1968 to 1980. The first five events were quite different, with some level of consistency finally beginning with the 1932 event—which, though it had differences from the 1924 competition, was roughly similar. The 1936 competition followed the 1932 one quite closely.

Of the 12 men who scored a perfect score on the first round in 1932, two returned in 1936: silver medalist Heinrich Hax of Germany and fourth-place finisher Walter Boninsegni of Italy. Boninsegni was the reigning (1935) world champion.

Latvia, Monaco, the Philippines, and Yugoslavia each made their debut in the event. The United States made its fifth appearance in the event, most of any nation.

The German and Swedish teams used a new Walther autoloader.

== Competition format ==
The competition format was very similar to the 1932 competition. All shooting was done at 25 metres. The first round consisted of 18 shots in 3 series of 6 shots each. For each series, there were six separate, 1.63 metre tall, standing silhouette targets that appeared for 8 seconds; the score for the series was how many targets were hit (there were no scoring rings). Maximum score was thus 18, 1 per shot.

Additional rounds were used as tie-breakers, with each round consisting of a single series of 6 shots. The time kept shortening: 6 seconds for the second round, 4 for the third, 3 for the fourth, and 2 for the fifth.

Shooters could use automatic pistols or revolvers of any calibre.

== Schedule ==
| Date | Time | Round |
|---|---|---|
| Thursday, 6 August 1936 | 8:30; 15:00 | First round Subsequent rounds |

== Results ==
Starting order and times were decided by draw. The competition started at 8.30 a.m.

Weather: Dry and fairly overcast. The first round was affected at times by the wind.

After the first round 25 competitors who were not able to hit all 18 targets were eliminated. After the second round another eleven shooters were eliminated, because they were unable to achieve all six hits. Twelve marksmen were eliminated after round three. Five shooters were left to compete in round four to determine their final position. The fourth round forced an issue and the final shoot off determined the bronze medal.

The five shooters who had hit 5 of the 6 targets in round 3 went to a tie-breaker under the same rules as round 4 (and when 2 were perfect there, another tie-breaker at round 5 rules). The Official Report also gives round 4 tie-breaker scores for 2 of the 5 shooters who scored 4 in the third round, but not the other shooters.

Cornelius van Oyen won the contest without missing any target.

The results of the competitors which were eliminated in the first round are unknown. They are listed in the order they appear in the official report.

| Rank | Shooter | Nation | Round 1 | Round 2 | Round 3 | Round 4 | Round 5 | Total |
|---|---|---|---|---|---|---|---|---|
| 1st place, gold medalist(s) | Cornelius van Oyen | Germany | 18 | 6 | 6 | 6 | — | 36 |
| 2nd place, silver medalist(s) | Heinrich Hax | Germany | 18 | 6 | 6 | 5 | — | 35 |
| 3rd place, bronze medalist(s) | Torsten Ullman | Sweden | 18 | 6 | 6 | 4 | 4* | 34 |
| 4 | Angelos Papadimas | Greece | 18 | 6 | 6 | 4 | 1* | 34 |
| 5 | Helge Meuller | Sweden | 18 | 6 | 6 | 3 | — | 33 |
| 6 | Walter Boninsegni | Italy | 18 | 6 | 5 | 6* | 3* | 29 |
| 7 | Kazimierz Suchorzewski | Poland | 18 | 6 | 5 | 6* | 1* | 29 |
| 8 | Haralds Marvē | Latvia | 18 | 6 | 5 | 3* | — | 29 |
| 9 | Hans Aasnæs | Norway | 18 | 6 | 5 | 2* | — | 29 |
| 10 | László Vadnay | Hungary | 18 | 6 | 5 | 1* | — | 29 |
| 11 | Bruno Giacconi | Italy | 18 | 6 | 4 | did not advance | — | 28 |
| 12 | Marcel Lafortune | Belgium | 18 | 6 | 4 | did not advance | — | 28 |
| 13 | Jaakko Rintanen | Finland | 18 | 6 | 4 | 4* | — | 28 |
| 14 | Jan Gasche | Czechoslovakia | 18 | 6 | 4 | 2* | — | 28 |
| 15 | Ingals Fisher | United States | 18 | 6 | 4 | did not advance | — | 28 |
| 16 | Élie Monnier | France | 18 | 6 | 2 | did not advance | — | 26 |
| 17 | Guillermo Huet | Mexico | 18 | 6 | 2 | did not advance | — | 26 |
| 18 | Michelangelo Borriello | Italy | 18 | 5 | did not advance | | — | 23 |
| 19 | Carlos Balestrini | Argentina | 18 | 5 | did not advance | | — | 23 |
| 20 | Christos Zalokostas | Greece | 18 | 5 | did not advance | | — | 23 |
| 21 | Ville Elo | Finland | 18 | 5 | did not advance | | — | 23 |
| 22 | Erik Sætter-Lassen | Denmark | 18 | 4 | did not advance | | — | 22 |
| 23 | Kārlis Kļava | Latvia | 18 | 4 | did not advance | | — | 22 |
| 24 | Morris Doob | United States | 18 | 4 | did not advance | | — | 22 |
| 25 | František Pokorný | Czechoslovakia | 18 | 4 | did not advance | | — | 22 |
| 26 | Sulo Cederström | Finland | 18 | 3 | did not advance | | — | 21 |
| 27 | Zenon Piątkowski | Poland | 18 | 3 | did not advance | | — | 21 |
| 28 | Lorenzo Amaya | Argentina | 18 | 1 | did not advance | | — | 19 |
| — | François Lafortune | Belgium | Unknown | Did not advance | | | — | Unknown |
| — | Axel Lerche | Denmark | Unknown | Did not advance | | | — | Unknown |
| — | Christen Møller | Denmark | Unknown | Did not advance | | | — | Unknown |
| — | Krikor Agathon | Egypt | Unknown | Did not advance | | | — | Unknown |
| — | Charles des Jammonières | France | Unknown | Did not advance | | | — | Unknown |
| — | Édouard Lambert | France | Unknown | Did not advance | | | — | Unknown |
| — | Georg Dern | Germany | Unknown | Did not advance | | | — | Unknown |
| — | Dimitrios Stathis | Greece | Unknown | Did not advance | | | — | Unknown |
| — | Jakab Kőszegi | Hungary | Unknown | Did not advance | | | — | Unknown |
| — | Dezső von Zirthy | Hungary | Unknown | Did not advance | | | — | Unknown |
| — | Carlos Acosta | Mexico | Unknown | Did not advance | | | — | Unknown |
| — | Roger Abel | Monaco | Unknown | Did not advance | | | — | Unknown |
| — | Michel Ravarino | Monaco | Unknown | Did not advance | | | — | Unknown |
| — | Herman Schultz | Monaco | Unknown | Did not advance | | | — | Unknown |
| — | Dirk van den Bosch | Netherlands | Unknown | Did not advance | | | — | Unknown |
| — | Martin Gison | Philippines | Unknown | Did not advance | | | — | Unknown |
| — | Otoniel Gonzaga | Philippines | Unknown | Did not advance | | | — | Unknown |
| — | Wojciech Bursa | Poland | Unknown | Did not advance | | | — | Unknown |
| — | Alberto Andressen | Portugal | Unknown | Did not advance | | | — | Unknown |
| — | Joaquim da Mota | Portugal | Unknown | Did not advance | | | — | Unknown |
| — | Carlos Queiroz | Portugal | Unknown | Did not advance | | | — | Unknown |
| — | Henrik Lönnberg | Sweden | Unknown | Did not advance | | | — | Unknown |
| — | Josef Kopecký | Czechoslovakia | Unknown | Did not advance | | | — | Unknown |
| — | Dean Hudnutt | United States | Unknown | Did not advance | | | — | Unknown |
| — | Lazar Jovanović | Yugoslavia | Unknown | Did not advance | | | — | Unknown |
