= Shooting at the 1936 Summer Olympics – Men's 50 metre rifle prone =

Men's 50 metre rifle, prone at the Games of the XI Olympiad
- Venue: Wannsee, Berlin, Germany
- Date: 8 August
- Competitors: 66 from 25 nations

Medalists
| 1st place, gold medalist(s) | | Willy Røgeberg | Norway |
| 2nd place, silver medalist(s) | | Ralph Berzsenyi | Hungary |
| 3rd place, bronze medalist(s) | | Władysław Karaś | Poland |

The men's 50 metre rifle, prone was a shooting sports event held as part of the Shooting at the 1936 Summer Olympics programme. It was the fifth appearance of the event. The competition was held on 8 August 1936 at the shooting ranges at Wannsee. 66 shooters from 25 nations competed.

== Medalists ==
| Gold | Silver | Bronze |
|---|---|---|
| Willy Røgeberg; Norway | Ralph Berzsenyi; Hungary | Władysław Karaś; Poland |

== Records ==
These were the standing world and Olympic records prior to the 1936 Summer Olympics.

| World record | - | none | - | - |
| Olympic record | 294(*) | (Sweden) Bertil Rönnmark | Los Angeles (USA) | August 13, 1932 |
| Olympic record | 398(**) | (France) Pierre Coquelin de Lisle | Paris (FRA) | June 23, 1924 |

There was no official world record registered.

(*) Olympic record according to the conditions of this Games - 300 rings possible

(**) 400 rings possible

== Results ==
Starting order: The competitors were divided into three groups after draw.

Starting times: First group 8.30 to 10.30 a.m., second group 11 a.m. to 1 p.m., and third group 3 to 5 p.m.

Weather: The first group started to shoot in the rain. But the rain stopped after half an hour. The overcast sky cleared up in the afternoon and brought occasional sunshine. The wind refreshed in the afternoon and disturbed occasionally.

The competition was held over 15 series of two shots, so every shooter had 30 shots. The maximum score was 300.

Willy Røgeberg won the contest with the maximum of 300 and set a new Olympic record. 12 shooters finished with a better score than the standing Olympic record prior the Games.

| Place | Shooter | Total |
|---|---|---|
| 1 | Willy Røgeberg (NOR) | 300 OR |
| 2 | Ralph Berzsenyi (HUN) | 296 |
| 3 | Władysław Karaś (POL) | 296 |
| 4 | Martin Gison (PHI) | 296 |
| 5 | José Mello (BRA) | 296 |
| 6 | Jacques Mazoyer (FRA) | 296 |
| 7 | Gustavo Huet (MEX) | 296 |
| 8 | Bertil Rönnmark (SWE) | 295 |
| 8 | Mario Zorzi (ITA) | 295 |
| 8 | Bruno Frietsch (FIN) | 295 |
| 8 | Vilhelm Johansen (DEN) | 295 |
| 8 | Zoltán Soós-Ruszka Hradetzky (HUN) | 295 |
| 13 | Alvaro García (MEX) | 294 |
| 13 | Tibor Tary (HUN) | 294 |
| 15 | Erland Koch (SWE) | 293 |
| 15 | Raymond Durand (FRA) | 293 |
| 15 | Olavi Elo (FIN) | 293 |
| 15 | Eduardo Santos (POR) | 293 |
| 15 | Erik Sætter-Lassen (DEN) | 293 |
| 15 | Mihai Ionescu-Călineşti (ROU) | 293 |
| 15 | Marcel Fitoussi (FRA) | 293 |
| 15 | Viljo Leskinen (FIN) | 293 |
| 23 | Antônio Guimarães (BRA) | 292 |
| 23 | Carlos Queiroz (POR) | 292 |
| 23 | Mauritz Amundsen (NOR) | 292 |
| 23 | Johann Schulz (GER) | 292 |
| 23 | Carlo Varetto (ITA) | 292 |
| 23 | Hakon Aasnæs (NOR) | 292 |
| 23 | Konstantinos Loudaros (GRE) | 292 |
| 23 | Erich Hotopf (GER) | 292 |
| 23 | Athanasios Aravositas (GRE) | 292 |
| 32 | Otoniel Gonzaga (PHI) | 291 |
| 32 | Karl August Larsson (SWE) | 291 |
| 32 | Rudolfs Baumanis (LAT) | 291 |
| 32 | Theodor Janisch (AUT) | 291 |
| 36 | Michel Ravarino (MON) | 290 |
| 36 | František Čermák (TCH) | 290 |
| 36 | Lodovico Nulli (ITA) | 290 |
| 36 | Julius Hansen (DEN) | 290 |
| 40 | Gheorghe Mirea (ROU) | 289 |
| 40 | Alois Navratil (AUT) | 289 |
| 40 | Jan Wrzosek (POL) | 289 |
| 40 | François Lafortune (BEL) | 289 |
| 44 | Georgios Vikhos (GRE) | 288 |
| 44 | Augustin Hilty (LIE) | 288 |
| 44 | Antonio García (MEX) | 288 |
| 44 | Antoni Pachla (POL) | 288 |
| 44 | Guillermo Canciani (ARG) | 288 |
| 44 | Arran Hoffmann (GER) | 288 |
| 44 | Jaroslav Mach (TCH) | 288 |
| 51 | Manoel Braga (BRA) | 287 |
| 51 | Jan Hendrik Brussaard (NED) | 287 |
| 51 | Jorge Patiño (PER) | 287 |
| 51 | Christiaan Both (NED) | 287 |
| 55 | Paul Van Asbroeck (BEL) | 285 |
| 55 | Marcel Lafortune (BEL) | 285 |
| 57 | Roger Abel (MON) | 284 |
| 58 | Boris Khristov (BUL) | 283 |
| 58 | Francisco António Real (POR) | 283 |
| 60 | Tieleman Vuurman (NED) | 282 |
| 61 | Alfred Hämmerle (AUT) | 281 |
| 61 | Rudolf Senti (LIE) | 281 |
| 63 | Rudolf Jehle (LIE) | 280 |
| 64 | Eduard Grand (ROU) | 279 |
| 65 | Pierre Marsan (MON) | 275 |
| – | František Pokorný (TCH) | DNF |

The places two to seven were established by comparison of the hits on target.
