= Shooting at the 1936 Summer Olympics =

Shooting at the Games of the XI Olympiad
- Dates: 6–8 August 1936

Shooting at the 1936 Summer Olympics in Berlin saw the reintroduction of 50 metre pistol (then called Free Pistol) but still only had three events. The competitions were held from 6 to 8 August 1936 at the shooting ranges at Wannsee. Germany succeeded only in winning one of the three gold medals; the others went to Scandinavians after great accomplishments: Torsten Ullman won Free Pistol with a margin of 15 points and a new world record, and Willy Røgeberg achieved the maximum score in the Prone event.

== Medal summary ==
Event	Gold	Silver	Bronze
rapid fire pistol	Cornelius van Oyen; Germany	Heinz Hax; Germany	Torsten Ullman; Sweden
pistol	Torsten Ullman; Sweden	Erich Krempel; Germany	Charles des Jammonières; France
rifle prone	Willy Røgeberg; Norway	Ralph Berzsenyi; Hungary	Władysław Karaś; Poland

== Participating nations ==
A total of 141 shooters from 29 nations competed at the Berlin Games:

- Argentina (5)
- Austria (3)
- Belgium (3)
- Brazil (4)
- Bulgaria (1)
- Chile (3)
- Czechoslovakia (7)
- Denmark (6)
- Egypt (1)
- Finland (8)
- France (8)
- Germany (9)
- Greece (8)
- Hungary (8)
- Italy (9)

- Latvia (3)
- Liechtenstein (3)
- Mexico (5)
- Monaco (6)
- Netherlands (4)
- Norway (4)
- Peru (1)
- Philippines (2)
- Poland (6)
- Portugal (6)
- Romania (4)
- Sweden (7)
- United States (6)
- Yugoslavia (1)

== Medal table ==
Rank	Nation	Gold	Silver	Bronze	Total
1	Germany	1	2	0	3
2	Sweden	1	0	1	2
3	Norway	1	0	0	1
4	Hungary	0	1	0	1
5	France	0	0	1	1
5	Poland	0	0	1	1
Totals (6 entries)		3	3	3	9
