= Duret =

Duret is a French surname. Notable people with the surname include:

- Claude Duret, (c. 1570–1611), French judge, botanist, historiographer and linguist
- Francisque Joseph Duret, (1804–1865), French sculptor
- François Duret, (1911-unknown), Swiss fencer
- François-Joseph Duret, (1732–1816), French sculptor
- Henri Duret, (1849–1921), French neurologist
- Théodore Duret, (1838–1927), French journalist, author and art critic

== See also ==
- Duret (grape), another name for the French wine grape Dureza
  - Peloursin, another French wine grape that is also known as Duret
- Durrette, disambiguation
