= Portugal at the 1936 Summer Olympics =

- IOC code: POR
- NOC: Olympic Committee of Portugal

in Berlin
- Competitors: 19 in 5 sports
- Flag bearer: Fasette
- Officials: 3
- Medals Ranked 30th: Gold 0 Silver 0 Bronze 1 Total 1

Summer Olympics appearances (overview)
- 1912; 1920; 1924; 1928; 1932; 1936; 1948; 1952; 1956; 1960; 1964; 1968; 1972; 1976; 1980; 1984; 1988; 1992; 1996; 2000; 2004; 2008; 2012; 2016; 2020; 2024

Portugal competed at the 1936 Summer Olympics in Berlin, Germany.

A delegation of nineteen competitors participated in five sports, with the equestrian team winning a bronze medal, Portugal's third since 1912.

== Medalists ==
=== Bronze ===
- Domingos de Sousa Coutinho, José Beltrão and Luís Mena e Silva — Equestrian, Team Jumping.

== Athletics ==
Men's Marathon

- Manuel Dias — 17th (2:49.00,0)
- Jaime Mendes — DNF

== Equestrian ==
Men's Individual Jumping

- Domingos de Sousa Coutinho — 16th (20 faults)
- José Beltrão — 6th (12 faults)
- Luís Mena e Silva — 21st (24 faults)

Men's Team Jumping

- Domingos de Sousa Coutinho, José Beltrão and Luís Mena e Silva — 3rd

== Fencing ==
Five fencers, all men, represented Portugal in 1936.

Men's épée

- Gustavo Carinhas — 1st round: 3rd (poule 6)
- Henrique da Silveira — 6th
- Paulo d'Eça Leal — semi-final: 9th (poule 1)

Men's team épée

- Gustavo Carinhas, António Mascarenhas de Menezes, Henrique da Silveira, João Sassetti and Paulo d'Eça Leal — semi-final: 5th - 8th (poule 2)

== Sailing ==
Men's Olympic Monotype

- Ernesto Vieira de Mendonça — 21st (62 points)

Men's Star

- Joaquim Mascarenhas de Fiúza and António Guedes de Herédia — 10th (28 points)

== Shooting ==
Men's 25m Rapid Fire Pistol (60 shots)

- Alberto Andressen — 1st round
- Joaquim da Mota — 1st round
- Carlos Queiroz — 1st round

Men's 50m Pistol (60 shots)

- Moysés Cardoso — 40th (490 rings)

Men's 50m Rifle Prone (60 shots)

- Carlos Queiroz — 11th (292 rings)
- Francisco António Real — 19th (283 rings)
- Eduardo Santos — 10th (293 rings)

== Officials ==
- César de Melo (chief of mission)
- António Mascarenhas de Menezes (fencing)
- Manuel da Costa Latino (equestrian)
- R. I. de Noronha (fencing)
