= Vadnay =

Vadnay is a surname. Notable people with the surname include:

- Endre A. Vadnay (1902–1969), Hungarian-born writer
- László Vadnay (1904–1967), Hungarian screenwriter
- László Vadnay (sport shooter) (1898–1972), Hungarian sports shooter
