= Clarence Fisher =

Clarence Fisher may refer to:

- Clarence Fisher (baseball) (1898–1965), American baseball player
- Clarence Stanley Fisher (1876–1941), American archaeologist
- Clarence L. Fisher (1877–1959), American businessman and politician from New York
- Clarence Ingals Fisher (1909–1942), American sports shooter
