= Lazar Jovanović =

Lazar Jovanović may refer to:

- Lazar Jovanović (sport shooter) (born 1904), Yugoslav sport shooter
- Lazar Jovanović (writer) (fl. 1835–1853), Serb manuscript writer from Ottoman Bosnia
- Lazar Jovanović (footballer, born 1993), Serbian football forward
- Lazar Jovanović (footballer, born 2006), Serbian football midfielder
