= Eduardo Santos =

Eduardo Santos may refer to:

- Eduardo Santos Montejo (1888–1974), Colombian publisher and president of Colombia
- Eduardo Santos (judoka) (born 1983), Brazilian judoka
- Eduardo Yudy Santos (born 1994), Brazilian judoka
- Eduardo Santos (sport shooter) (1899–?), Portuguese sports shooter
- Eduardo Santos (footballer) (born 1997), Brazilian footballer
- Eduardo Santos Itoiz (born 1973), Navarrese politician
