= Hämmerle =

Hämmerle is a German surname. Notable people with the surname include:

- Alessandro Hämmerle (born 1993), Swiss-born Austrian snowboarder
- Alfred Hämmerle, Austrian sports shooter
- Elisa Hämmerle (born 1995), Austrian artistic gymnast
