= Carlos Queiroz (disambiguation) =

Carlos Queiroz is a Portuguese football coach.

Carlos Queiroz may also refer to:

- Carlos de Sousa Queirós, Angolan football coach
- Carlos Queiroz (sport shooter), Portuguese Olympic shooter
