= Giacconi =

Giacconi may refer to:

- Bruno Giacconi (1889–1957), Italian sports shooter
- Riccardo Giacconi (1931–2018), Italian-American Nobel Prize-winning astrophysicist

- 3371 Giacconi, an asteroid
