= Carlos Costa =

Carlos Costa may refer to:

- Carlos Costa (banker) (born 1949), governor of the Portuguese central bank
- Carlos Costa (footballer) (born 1966), Portuguese football player and coach
- Carlos Costa (pilot) (1966–1996), American private pilot
- Carlos Costa (tennis) (born 1968), Spanish former tennis player
- Carlos Costa (swimmer) (born 1973), Canadian swimmer in the Canadian Disability Hall of Fame
- Carlos Azpiroz Costa (born 1956), Argentine Dominican friar, Archbishop of Bahia Costa

== See also ==
- Carlos Acosta (born 1973), Cuban-born British ballet dancer
- Carlos Acosta (sport shooter) (born 1908), Mexican Olympic shooter
