= Vuurman =

Vuurman is a surname. Notable people with the surname include:

- Tieleman Vuurman (1899–1991), Dutch sport shooter and Olympian, son of Uilke
- Uilke Vuurman (1872–1955), Dutch sport shooter and Olympian, father of Tieleman
