= Roman Fischer =

Roman Fischer may refer to:

- Roman Fischer (fencer) (born 1915), Austrian fencer
- Roman Fischer (footballer) (born 1983), Czech footballer
