= Mirea =

Mirea is a Romanian surname. Notable people with the surname include:

- Cornel Mirea (born 1963), Romanian footballer
- Florinel Mirea (born 1974), Romanian footballer
- George Demetrescu Mirea (1852–1934), Romanian painter
- Gheorghe Mirea (1908–?), Romanian sports shooter
- Ioan Mirea, Romanian painter and graphic artist
