= Jakl =

Jakl and Jákl (feminines: Jaklová, Jáklová) are Czech surnames. Notable people with the surname include:

- Ladislav Jakl (born 1959), Czech musician and journalist
- Petr Jákl (born 1973), Czech actor, director, producer and judo fighter
- Petr Jákl Sr. (born 1941), Czech judo fighter
- Vilém Jakl (1915–?), Czech cyclist

== See also ==
- Antal Jäkl (born 1971), Hungarian footballer
