= Baumanis =

Baumanis (feminine: Baumane) is a Latvian surname of German origin (from German surname Baumann). Individuals with the surname include:

- Arnolds Baumanis, Latvian sport wrestler
- Herberts Baumanis, Latvian sprinter
- Jānis Baumanis (born 1992), Latvian racing driver
- Jānis Frīdrihs Baumanis (1834–1891), Latvian architect
- Kārlis Baumanis (1835–1905), Latvian classical composer
- Rudolfs Baumanis (1909–1998), Latvian sport shooter
- Valdemārs Baumanis (1905–1992), Latvian basketball player and coach
