= Julius Hansen =

Danish sports shooter (1896–1989)

Personal information
- Born: 10 July 1896 Sundby, Copenhagen, Denmark
- Died: 11 March 1989 (aged 92) Slangerup, Denmark

Sport
- Sport: Sports shooting

Julius Hansen (10 July 1896 – 11 March 1989) was a Danish sports shooter. He competed in the 50 m rifle event at the 1936 Summer Olympics.
