= Kazimierz Suchorzewski =

Polish sports shooter

Personal information
- Born: 14 January 1895 Goworowo, Russian Empire
- Died: 13 October 1965 (aged 70)

Sport
- Sport: Sports shooting

Kazimierz Suchorzewski (14 January 1895 – 13 October 1965) was a Polish sports shooter. He competed in the 25 m pistol event at the 1936 Summer Olympics.
