= Guillermo Huet =

Mexican sports shooter

Personal information
- Full name: Guillermo Huet Bobadilla
- Born: 31 July 1897 Mexico City, Mexico

Sport
- Sport: Sports shooting

Guillermo Huet (born 31 July 1897, date of death unknown) was a Mexican sports shooter. He competed in the 25 m pistol event at the 1936 Summer Olympics.
