= Ville Elo =

Finnish sports shooter

Personal information
- Born: 27 June 1895 Tampere, Finland
- Died: 3 February 1947 (aged 51) Helsinki, Finland

Sport
- Sport: Sports shooting

Ville Elo (27 June 1895 – 3 February 1947) was a Finnish sports shooter. He competed in the 25 m pistol event at the 1936 Summer Olympics.
