= Birger Cederin =

Swedish fencer (1895–1942)

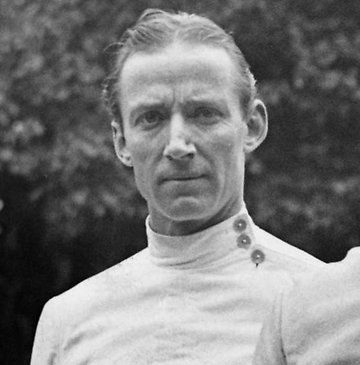

Personal information
- Born: 20 April 1895 Jönköping, Sweden
- Died: 22 March 1942 (aged 46)

Sport
- Sport: Fencing
Medal record
Men's fencing
Representing Sweden
Olympic Games
Silver medal – second place	1936 Berlin	Épée, team

Birger Cederin (20 April 1895 – 22 March 1942) was a Swedish fencer. He won a silver medal in the team épée event at the 1936 Summer Olympics.
