= Alvaro García (sport shooter) =

Mexican sports shooter

Personal information
- Born: 16 September 1894 Pánuco, Zacatecas, Mexico
- Died: 22 September 1983 (aged 89) Mexico City, Mexico

Sport
- Sport: Sports shooting

Alvaro García (16 September 1894 – 22 September 1983) was a Mexican sports shooter. He competed in the 50 m rifle event at the 1936 Summer Olympics.
