= José Mello =

Brazilian sports shooter

Personal information
- Full name: José Salvador da Trinidade Mello
- Born: 20 May 1895 Nova Friburgo, Brazil

Sport
- Sport: Sports shooting

José Mello (born 20 May 1895, date of death unknown) was a Brazilian sports shooter. He competed in the 50 m rifle event at the 1936 Summer Olympics.
