= Guillermo Canciani =

Argentine sports shooter (born 1918)

Personal information
- Born: 18 November 1918

Sport
- Sport: Sports shooting

Guillermo Canciani (born 18 November 1918, date of death unknown) was an Argentine sports shooter. He competed in the 50 m rifle event at the 1936 Summer Olympics. Canciani is deceased.
