= Morris Doob =

American sports shooter

Personal information
- Born: March 22, 1907 Cincinnati, Ohio, United States
- Died: March 26, 1966 (aged 59) Cook County, Illinois, United States

Sport
- Sport: Sports shooting

Morris Doob (March 22, 1907 – March 26, 1966) was an American sports shooter. He competed in the 25 m pistol event at the 1936 Summer Olympics.
