= 1938 World Fencing Championships =

International fencing competition

1938 World Championships in Fencing
- Host city: Piešťany, Czechoslovakia

The 1938 World Fencing Championships were held in Piešťany, Czechoslovakia (present-day Slovakia).

== Medal table ==
* Host nation (Czechoslovakia)

Rank	Nation	Gold	Silver	Bronze	Total
1	Italy (ITA)	4	3	2	9
2	France (FRA)	2	2	2	6
3	Czechoslovakia (TCH)*	1	1	1	3
4	Sweden (SWE)	0	1	0	1
5	Belgium (BEL)	0	0	1	1
5	Netherlands (NED)	0	0	1	1
Totals (6 entries)		7	7	7	21

== Medal summary ==
=== Men's events ===
Event	Gold	Silver	Bronze
Individual Foil	(Kingdom of Italy) Gioacchino Guaragna	(Kingdom of Italy) Giorgio Bocchino	(France) Edward Gardère
Team Foil	(Kingdom of Italy) Italy	France	Czechoslovakia
Individual Sabre	(Kingdom of Italy) Aldo Montano	(Kingdom of Italy) Aldo Masciotta	(Kingdom of Italy) Giuseppe Perenno
Team Sabre	(Kingdom of Italy) Italy	France	Netherlands
Individual Épée	(France) Michel Pécheux	(Kingdom of Italy) Edoardo Mangiarotti	(France) Bernard Schmetz
Team Épée	France	Sweden	(Kingdom of Italy) Italy

=== Women's events ===
Event	Gold	Silver	Bronze
Individual Foil	(Czechoslovakia) Marie Šedivá	(Czechoslovakia) Carmen Slabochová	(Belgium) Jenny Addams
