= Arran Hoffmann =

German sports shooter

Personal information
- Born: 28 August 1902
- Died: 18 June 1990 (aged 87) Honolulu, United States

Sport
- Sport: Sports shooting

Arran Hoffmann (28 August 1902 – 18 June 1990) was a German sports shooter. He competed in the 50 m rifle event at the 1936 Summer Olympics.
