= Dimitrios Stathis =

Greek sports shooter

Personal information
- Born: 1909

Sport
- Sport: Sports shooting

Dimitrios Stathis (born 1909, date of death unknown) was a Greek sports shooter. He competed in the 25 m pistol event at the 1936 Summer Olympics.
