= Konstantinos Loudaros =

Greek sports shooter

Personal information
- Born: 1912

Sport
- Sport: Sports shooting

Konstantinos Loudaros (born 1912, date of death unknown) was a Greek sports shooter. He competed in the 50 m rifle event at the 1936 Summer Olympics.
