= Saverio Ragno =

Italian fencer (1902–1969)

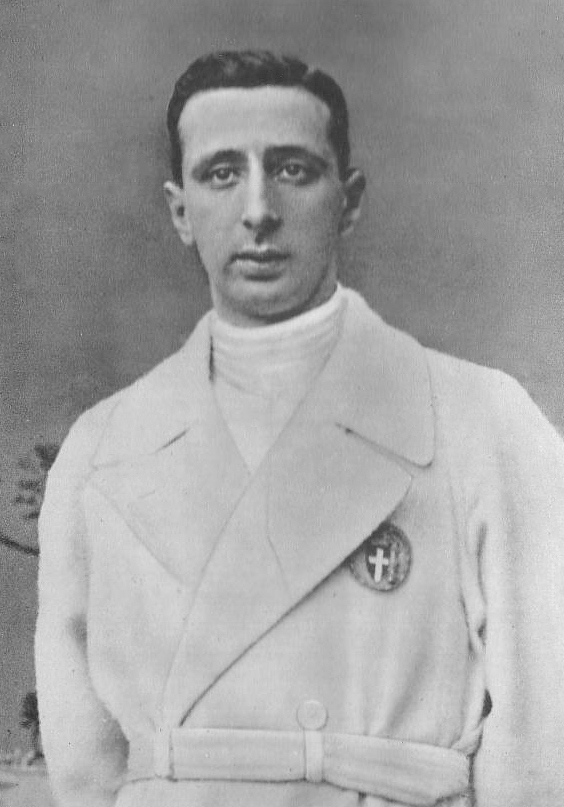
- Ragno c. 1937

Personal information
- Born: 6 December 1902 Trani, Italy
- Died: 22 April 1969 (aged 66) Sacile, Italy
- Height: 167 cm (5 ft 6 in)

Sport
- Sport: Fencing
- Event(s): Épée, foil
Medal record
Representing Italy
Olympic Games
Silver medal – second place	1932 Los Angeles	Épée, team
Gold medal – first place	1936 Berlin	Épée, team
Silver medal – second place	1936 Berlin	Épée, ind.
Silver medal – second place	1948 London	Foil, team
World Fencing Championships
Gold medal – first place	1930 Liège	Foil, team
Silver medal – second place	1930 Liège	Épée, team
Gold medal – first place	1931 Vienna	Foil, team
Gold medal – first place	1931 Vienna	Épée, team
Gold medal – first place	1933 Budapest	Foil, team
Gold medal – first place	1933 Budapest	Épée, team
Silver medal – second place	1933 Budapest	Épée, ind.
Silver medal – second place	1934 Warsaw	Épée, team
Bronze medal – third place	1935 Lausanne	Épée, ind.
Gold medal – first place	1937 Paris	Épée, team
Bronze medal – third place	1938 Piešťany	Épée, team
Silver medal – second place	1947 Lisbon	Foil, team
Bronze medal – third place	1947 Lisbon	Épée, team
Gold medal – first place	1950 Monte Carlo	Foil, team

Saverio Ragno (6 December 1902 – 22 April 1969) was an Italian fencer. He competed at the 1932, 1936 and 1948 Olympics and won a gold and three silver medals. He also won 14 medals at the world championships and five Italian titles. His daughter Antonella Ragno-Lonzi became an Olympic champion in fencing in 1972.
