= Paul Wormser =

French fencer (1905–1944)

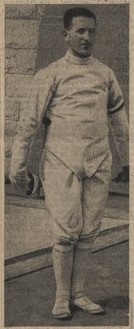
- 1936

Personal information
- Born: 11 June 1905 Colmar, Germany
- Died: 17 August 1944 (aged 39) Sainte-Radegonde, Aveyron, France

Sport
- Sport: Fencing
Medal record
Men's fencing
Representing France
Olympic Games
Bronze medal – third place	1936 Berlin	Épée, team

Paul Wormser (11 June 1905 – 17 August 1944) was a French fencer. He won a bronze medal in the team épée event at the 1936 Summer Olympics.
