= Antoni Pachla =

Polish sports shooter

Personal information
- Born: 21 March 1901 Lemberg, Austria-Hungary
- Died: 20 April 1962 (aged 61) Piotrków Trybunalski, Poland

Sport
- Sport: Sports shooting

Antoni Pachla (21 March 1901 – 20 April 1962) was a Polish sports shooter. He competed in the 50 m rifle event at the 1936 Summer Olympics.
