= Roman Kantor =

Polish fencer (1912–1943)

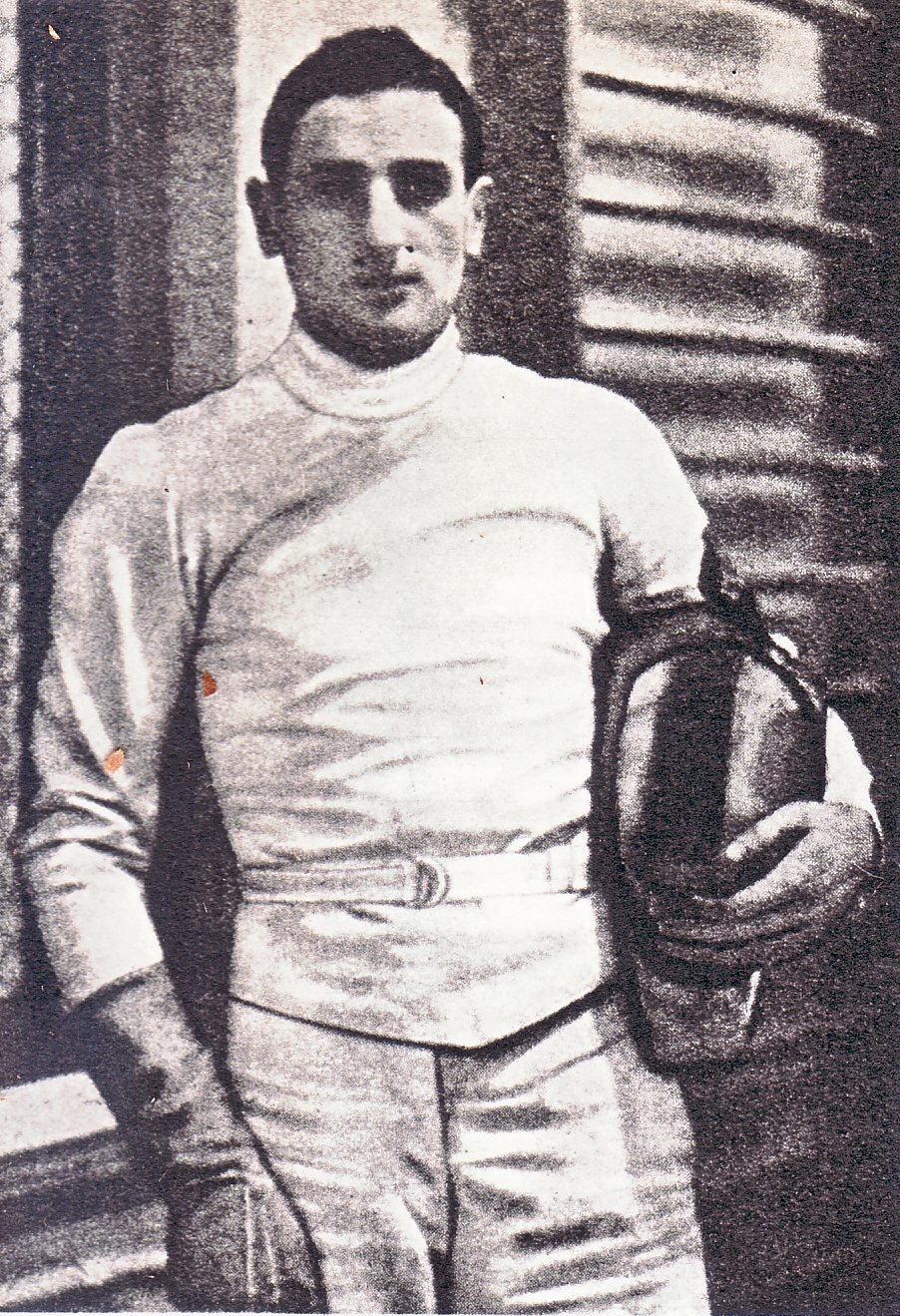
- Kantor c. 1930s

Personal information
- Full name: Roman Józef Kantor
- Born: 15 March 1912 Łódź, Congress Poland, Russian Empire
- Died: 1943 (aged 30–31) Majdanek concentration camp, Poland

Sport
- Country: Poland
- Sport: Fencing

Roman Józef Kantor (15 March 1912 – 1943) was a Polish Olympic épée fencer.

== Early life ==
Kantor was born in Łódź, Poland, and was Jewish. He was the son of Elchanan and Barbara (née Bekier) Kantor. After finishing local primary school, he left for Paris in 1924 to continue his education. He played tennis and was captain of the school soccer team.

== Fencing career ==
He also started to train in fencing. Shortly after, he received 3rd place in fencing at the academic championship of Paris, and 6th place at the Open Championship of France in 1929.

He then trained in England from 1931–32 under the supervision of fencer Lefevre’a, and in Germany under the supervision of Italian coach Gatzera. In 1934 he returned to Łódź and joined the fencing section of the Army Sport Club, twice winning the team title of City Champion. In 1935 he won the title of Warsaw and contributed to the Polish victory over Germany.

After receiving 2nd place at the Open Championship in Lviv, he was nominated a member of the Olympic delegation for the 1936 Summer Olympics in Berlin in 1936. There, at the age of 24, he won seven bouts in the quarterfinals in épée (defeating eventual silver medal winner Saverio Ragno) and four in the semifinals (defeating eventual gold medal winner Franco Riccardi), but did not get to the finals. He did, however, contributed to receiving an 8th spot finish by the Polish épée team.

In December 1936, he moved to Łódzki Klub Sportowy. He was twice champion of the city, both in individual and team fencing (1938 and 1939). He won the Nordic countries championship in 1938 and received a 2nd place in 1939 in the last Championship of Poland before the outbreak of World War II. On 14 May 1939, he took the Olympic oath with other Łódź Olympians before the planned 1940 12th Summer Olympic Games.

When the Germans took over Poland, however, he escaped to Lviv, where in 1940, in Kharkiv, he won the Championship of the Soviet Union.

== Concentration camp and death ==
When Lviv was taken over by the Germans, to escape the Nazis because he was Jewish, he obtained a passport and citizenship of a South American country, and waited for the German authorities' permit to leave for a neutral country. In this time, he lived in a building on Sapieha Street. It turned out that the Germans were misleading the inhabitants of the building, and they were all later arrested and transported in 1942 to the Majdanek concentration and extermination camp. There, Kantor was forced to do work for Ostindustrie, and was mentioned in the 1943 register of prisoners.

He was murdered there in 1943. The Jewish Polish swimmer Ilja Szrajbman, who had also participated in the 1936 Berlin Olympics, was also murdered by the Nazis that year. Kantor was one of approximately three million Polish Jews murdered during the Holocaust.

== See also ==
- List of select Jewish fencers
