= Zenon Piątkowski =

Polish sports shooter

Personal information
- Born: 17 February 1902 Nasielsk, Congress Poland
- Died: 12 April 1967 (aged 65) Warsaw, Poland

Sport
- Sport: Sports shooting

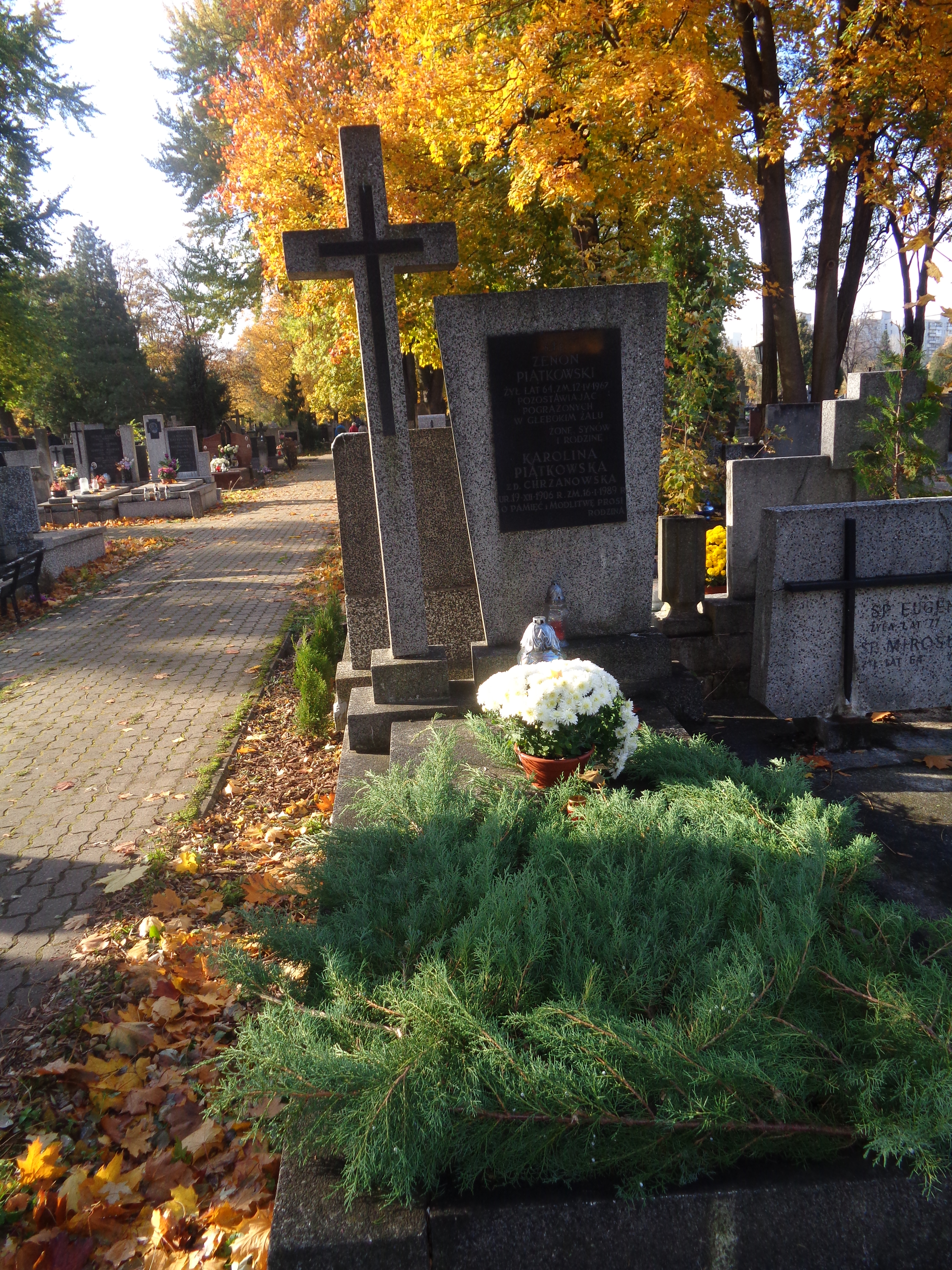
Grave Zenon Piątkowski on Bródno Cemetery

Zenon Piątkowski (17 February 1902 – 12 April 1967) was a Polish sports shooter. He competed in the 25 m pistol event at the 1936 Summer Olympics.
