= Johann Schulz (sport shooter) =

Sports shooter

Personal information
- Born: 22 April 1897

Sport
- Sport: Sports shooting

Johann Schulz (born 22 April 1897, date of death unknown) was a German sports shooter. He competed in the 50 m rifle event at the 1936 Summer Olympics.
