= Georg Dern =

German sports shooter

Personal information
- Born: 9 April 1901

Sport
- Sport: Sports shooting

Georg Dern (born 9 April 1901, date of death unknown) was a German sports shooter. He competed in the 25 m pistol event at the 1936 Summer Olympics.
