= Erich Hotopf =

German sports shooter

Personal information
- Born: 14 October 1909

Sport
- Sport: Sports shooting

Erich Hotopf (born 14 October 1909, date of death unknown) was a German sports shooter. He competed in the 50 m rifle event at the 1936 Summer Olympics.
