= Élie Monnier =

French sports shooter

Personal information
- Born: 24 June 1908 Paris, France
- Died: 12 May 1941 (aged 32) Mers El Kébir, Algeria

Sport
- Sport: Sports shooting

Élie Monnier (24 June 1908 – 12 May 1941) was a French sports shooter. He competed in the 25 m pistol event at the 1936 Summer Olympics. An engineer in the French Navy during World War II, Monnier drowned while exploring the wreckage of the battleship Bretagne in 1941.
