= Antonio García (sport shooter) =

Mexican sports shooter

Personal information
- Born: 17 January 1909 Mexico City, Mexico
- Died: 15 July 1993 (aged 84) Mexico City, Mexico

Sport
- Sport: Sports shooting

Antonio García (17 January 1909 – 15 July 1993) was a Mexican sports shooter. He competed in the 50 m rifle event at the 1936 Summer Olympics.
