= Cornelius van Oyen =

German sport shooter (1886–1954)

Personal information
- Born: 28 November 1886 Brandenburg an der Havel, Germany
- Died: 19 January 1954 (aged 67) Berlin, Germany

Sport
- Sport: Sports shooting
Medal record
Men's shooting
Representing Germany
Olympic Games
Gold medal – first place	1936 Berlin	25 m rapid fire pistol

Cornelius van Oyen (28 November 1886 – 19 January 1954) was a German sport shooter who competed in the 1936 Summer Olympics. In 1936 he won the gold medal in the 25 metre rapid fire pistol event.
