= Jan Wrzosek =

Polish sports shooter (1895–1939)

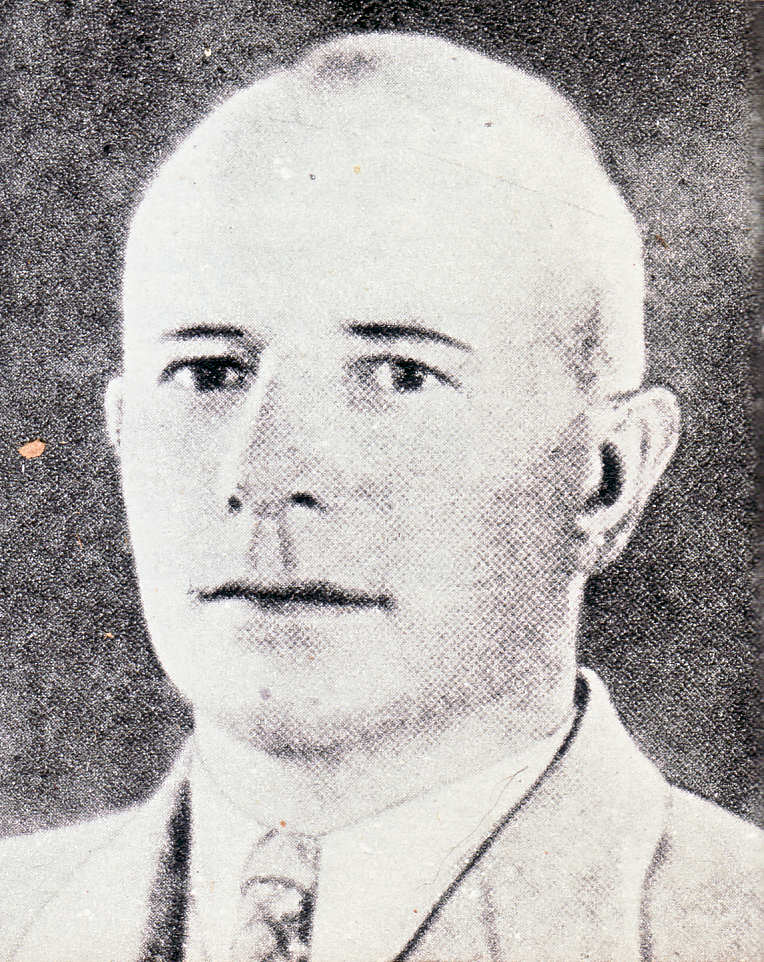

Personal information
- Born: 6 March 1895 Stavropol, Russian Empire
- Died: 3 September 1939 (aged 44) Złoty Potok, Poland

Sport
- Sport: Sports shooting

Jan Wrzosek (6 March 1895 – 3 September 1939) was a Polish sports shooter. He competed in the 50 m rifle event at the 1936 Summer Olympics. He was killed in action during the September Campaign in 1939.
