= Lodovico Nulli =

Italian sports shooter

Personal information
- Born: 20 February 1891 Brescia, Italy
- Died: 20 March 1962 (aged 71)

Sport
- Sport: Sports shooting

Lodovico Nulli (20 February 1891 – 20 March 1962) was an Italian sports shooter. He competed in the 50 m rifle event at the 1936 Summer Olympics.
