= Vilhelm Johansen =

Danish sports shooter (1898–1993)

Personal information
- Born: 16 September 1898 Frederikssund, Denmark
- Died: 21 December 1993 (aged 95) Gentofte, Denmark

Sport
- Sport: Sports shooting

Vilhelm Johansen (16 September 1898 – 21 December 1993) was a Danish sports shooter. He competed in the 50 m rifle event at the 1936 Summer Olympics.
