= Dirk van den Bosch =

Dutch sports shooter

Personal information
- Born: 14 August 1906 The Hague, Netherlands
- Died: 20 December 1994 (aged 88) Eelde, Netherlands

Sport
- Sport: Sports shooting

Dirk van den Bosch (14 August 1906 – 20 December 1994) was a Dutch sports shooter. He competed in the 25 m pistol event at the 1936 Summer Olympics.
