= Boris Khristov =

Bulgarian sports shooter

Personal information
- Born: 6 February 1897

Sport
- Sport: Sports shooting

Boris Khristov (born 6 February 1897, date of death unknown) was a Bulgarian sports shooter. He competed in the 50 m rifle event at the 1936 Summer Olympics.
