= Gustav Almgren =

Swedish fencer (1906–1936)

Personal information
- Born: 6 November 1906
- Died: 31 August 1936 (aged 29) Gothenburg, Sweden

Sport
- Sport: Fencing
Medal record
Men's fencing
Representing Sweden
Olympic Games
Silver medal – second place	1936 Berlin	Épée, team

Gustav Almgren (6 November 1906 – 31 August 1936) was a Swedish fencer. He won a silver medal in the team épée event at the 1936 Summer Olympics.
