= Sulo Cederström =

Finnish sports shooter

Personal information
- Full name: Sulo Elis Cederström
- Born: 11 February 1903 Kouvola, Finland
- Died: 26 June 1944 (aged 41)

Sport
- Sport: Sports shooting

Sulo Elis Cederström (11 February 1903 – 26 June 1944) was a Finnish sports shooter. He competed in the 25 m pistol event at the 1936 Summer Olympics. He was killed on the Karelian Isthmus, during the Winter War.
