= Jakab Kőszegi =

Hungarian sports shooter

Personal information
- Born: 22 August 1888 Budakeszi, Austria-Hungary
- Died: 31 August 1982 (aged 94) Pfarrkirchen, Germany

Sport
- Sport: Sports shooting

Jakab Kőszegi (22 August 1888 – 31 August 1982) was a Hungarian sports shooter. He competed in the 25 m pistol event at the 1936 Summer Olympics.
