= Wojciech Bursa =

Polish sports shooter

Personal information
- Born: 23 April 1895
- Died: April 1940 (aged 44–45)

Sport
- Sport: Sports shooting

Wojciech Bursa (23 April 1895 – April 1940) was a Polish sports shooter. He competed in the 25 m pistol event at the 1936 Summer Olympics. He was killed during the Katyn massacre, in the month of his 45th birthday in April 1940.
