= Dezső von Zirthy =

Hungarian sports shooter (1902–1985)

Personal information
- Full name: Dezső Sándor Miklós Zirthy
- Born: 5 December 1902 Budapest, Austria-Hungary
- Died: 6 September 1985 (aged 82) Budapest, Hungary

Sport
- Sport: Sports shooting

Dezső von Zirthy (5 December 1902 – 6 September 1985) was a Hungarian sports shooter. He competed in the 25 m pistol event at the 1936 Summer Olympics.
