= Henrik Lönnberg =

Swedish sports shooter

Personal information
- Born: 27 April 1896 Ljusdal, Sweden
- Died: 28 December 1974 (aged 78) Stockholm, Sweden

Sport
- Sport: Sports shooting

Henrik Lönnberg (27 April 1896 – 28 December 1974) was a Swedish sports shooter. He competed in the 25 m pistol event at the 1936 Summer Olympics.
