= Jorge Patiño =

Peruvian sports shooter

Personal information
- Born: 18 December 1911 Lima, Peru

Sport
- Sport: Sports shooting

Jorge Patiño (born 18 December 1911) was a Peruvian sports shooter. He competed in the 50 m rifle event at the 1936 Summer Olympics.
