= Grete Neumann =

Austrian sprinter 1912–1946

Personal information
- Nationality: Austrian
- Born: Margarethe Antonia Berta "Grete" Neumann; 19 June 1912 Vienna, Austria-Hungary
- Died: 14 September 1946 (aged 34) Vienna, Austria

Sport
- Sport: Sprinting
- Event: 100 metres

Grete Neumann (19 June 1912 – 14 September 1946) was an Austrian sprinter. She competed in the women's 100 metres at the 1936 Summer Olympics.
