= František Jirásek =

Czech footballer

Personal information
- Date of death: 10 May 1941 (aged 56)
- Place of death: Prague, Bohemia and Moravia
- Position: Midfielder

Senior career*
Years	Team	Apps	(Gls)
- Smíchov

International career
1906–1907	Bohemia	2	(0)
- * Club domestic league appearances and goals

František Jirásek (died 10 May 1941) was a Czech footballer who played as a midfielder.

== Club career ==
During his playing career, Jirásek played for Smíchov.

== International career ==
On 1 April 1906, Jirásek made his debut for Bohemia in Bohemia's second game, (Note: The April 1906 meeting is regarded as the first official game for Bohemia by the Football Association of the Czech Republic (FAČR), with a meeting between Hungary and Bohemia on 5 April 1903 subsequently being recognised as a Prague representative team by the FAČR. The Hungarian Football Federation recognises the April 1903 meeting as official for Bohemia.) starting in a 1–1 draw against Hungary. Jirásek would later make one final appearance for Bohemia on 7 April 1907.

== Post-playing career ==
Following his playing career, Jirásek went into breeding livestock. Before his death in 1941, Jirásek was also honorary chairman of SK Libeň.
