= Charlotte Machmer =

Austrian sprinter

Personal information
- Nationality: Austrian
- Born: 13 August 1905
- Died: June 1997 (aged 91)

Sport
- Sport: Sprinting
- Event: 100 metres

Charlotte Machmer (13 August 1905 – June 1997) was an Austrian sprinter. She competed in the women's 100 metres at the 1936 Summer Olympics.
