= Ralph Berzsenyi =

Hungarian sport shooter (1909–1978)

Personal information
- Born: 26 February 1909 Fiume, Austria-Hungary
- Died: 10 June 1978 (aged 69) Budapest, Hungary

Sport
- Sport: Sports shooting
Medal record
Men's shooting
Representing Hungary
Olympic Games
Silver medal – second place	1936 Berlin	50 m rifle, prone

Ralph Berzsenyi (German: Erich Beusterien; 26 February 1909 – 10 June 1978) was a Hungarian sport shooter who competed in the 1936 Summer Olympics.

He was born in Fiume and died in Budapest.

In 1936 he won the silver medal in the 50 metre rifle, prone event.
