= Alfred Staszewicz =

Polish fencer

Personal information
- Born: 30 January 1896
- Died: 20 October 1973 (aged 77) Vienna, Austria

Sport
- Sport: Fencing

Alfred Staszewicz (30 January 1896 – 20 October 1973) was a Polish fencer. He competed in the team épée event at the 1936 Summer Olympics. He was also the only Pole who competed in the Inter-Allied Games in 1919.
