= Jan Gasche =

Czech sport shooter

Personal information
- Born: 29 December 1906

Sport
- Sport: Sport shooting

Jan Gasche (29 December 1906 – ?) was a Czech sport shooter. He competed for Czechoslovakia in the 25 m pistol event at the 1936 Summer Olympics.
