= Eduard Grand =

Romanian sports shooter

Eduard Grant
Personal information
- Born: 15 December 1898
- Died: April 1978 (aged 79)

Sport
- Sport: Sports shooting

Eduard Grand (15 December 1898 – April 1978) was a Romanian sports shooter. He competed in the 50 m rifle event at the 1936 Summer Olympics.
