= Carmen Raisová =

Czechoslovak fencer

Personal information
- Born: 7 February 1908

Sport
- Sport: Fencing

Carmen Raisová (born 7 February 1908, date of death unknown) was a Czechoslovak fencer. She competed in the women's individual foil event at the 1936 Summer Olympics. At the 1938 World Fencing Championships in Piešťany, she finished second in the women's individual foil competition.

Her brother, Václav Rais, was also a fencer.

== See also ==
- 1938 World Fencing Championships
