= Rudolf Wöber =

Austrian long-distance runner

Personal information
- Nationality: Austrian
- Born: 10 November 1911
- Died: 14 February 1982 (aged 70)

Sport
- Sport: Long-distance running
- Event: Marathon

Rudolf Wöber (10 November 1911 – 14 February 1982) was an Austrian long-distance runner. He competed in the marathon at the 1936 Summer Olympics.
