= Rudolfs Baumanis =

Latvian sports shooter (1909–1998)

Rūdolfs Baumanis
Personal information
- Born: 14 August 1909 Olaine parish, Livonian Governorate, Russian Empire
- Died: 15 May 1998 (aged 88) Portage, Indiana, United States

Sport
- Sport: Sports shooting

Rūdolfs Reinhards Baumanis (14 August 1909 – 15 May 1998) was a Latvian sports shooter. He competed in the 50 m rifle event at the 1936 Summer Olympics.
