= Tieleman Vuurman =

Dutch sports shooter

Personal information
- Born: 22 June 1899 Rotterdam, Netherlands
- Died: 11 August 1991 (aged 92) Amsterdam, Netherlands

Sport
- Sport: Sports shooting

Tieleman Vuurman (22 June 1899 – 11 August 1991) was a Dutch sports shooter. He competed in the 50 metre rifle event at the 1936 Summer Olympics.
