= Tibor Klein =

Slovak fencer

Personal information
- Nationality: Slovak
- Born: Unknown Kassa, Austria-Hungary
- Died: Unknown Unknown

Sport
- Country: Czechoslovakia
- Sport: Fencing
- Event: Sabre
- Club: KAC Košice
- Coached by: Šándor Salamon, Samuel Pečenovský
Medal record
Representing (Slovakia) Slovak krajina
Czechoslovak Fencing Championships
Gold medal – first place	1928 Prague	Sabre
Gold medal – first place	1934 Prague	Sabre
Silver medal – second place	1930 Prague	Sabre

Tibor Klein (Unknown; Unknown) was a Slovak fencer. He was a two-time champion of Czechoslovakia in sabre. His brother A. Klein was also a famous Košice fencer and Slovak champion in Épée.

== Biography ==
In 1929, the KAC Košice club organized a memorial to Dr. Gádor, which met the clubs KAC Košice and ŠOD Levoča. This tournament Klein won and his brother Eng. A. Klein was second in Épée.

== National titles ==
Czechoslovak Fencing Championships:

- 1928 Prague: (gold) (Sabre)
- 1930 Prague: (silver) (Sabre)
- 1934 Prague: (gold) (Sabre)

Dr. Gádor Memorial

- 1929 Košice: (gold) (Sabre)

Dr. Heil Cup

- 1929 Košice: (gold) (Team)
