= Otoniel Gonzaga (sport shooter) =

Filipino sports shooter

Personal information
- Born: September 30, 1913
- Died: c. 1941–1946

Sport
- Sport: Sports shooting

Otoniel Gonzaga (born September 30, 1913, date of death unknown) was a Filipino sports shooter. He competed in three events at the 1936 Summer Olympics. He was killed during World War II.
