= Eugen Geiwitz =

German fencer (1901–1984)

Personal information
- Born: 14 December 1901
- Died: 14 April 1984 (aged 82)

Sport
- Sport: Fencing

Eugen Geiwitz (14 December 1901 – 14 April 1984) was a German fencer. He competed in the team épée event at the 1936 Summer Olympics.
