= Władysław Karaś =

Polish sport shooter (1893–1942)

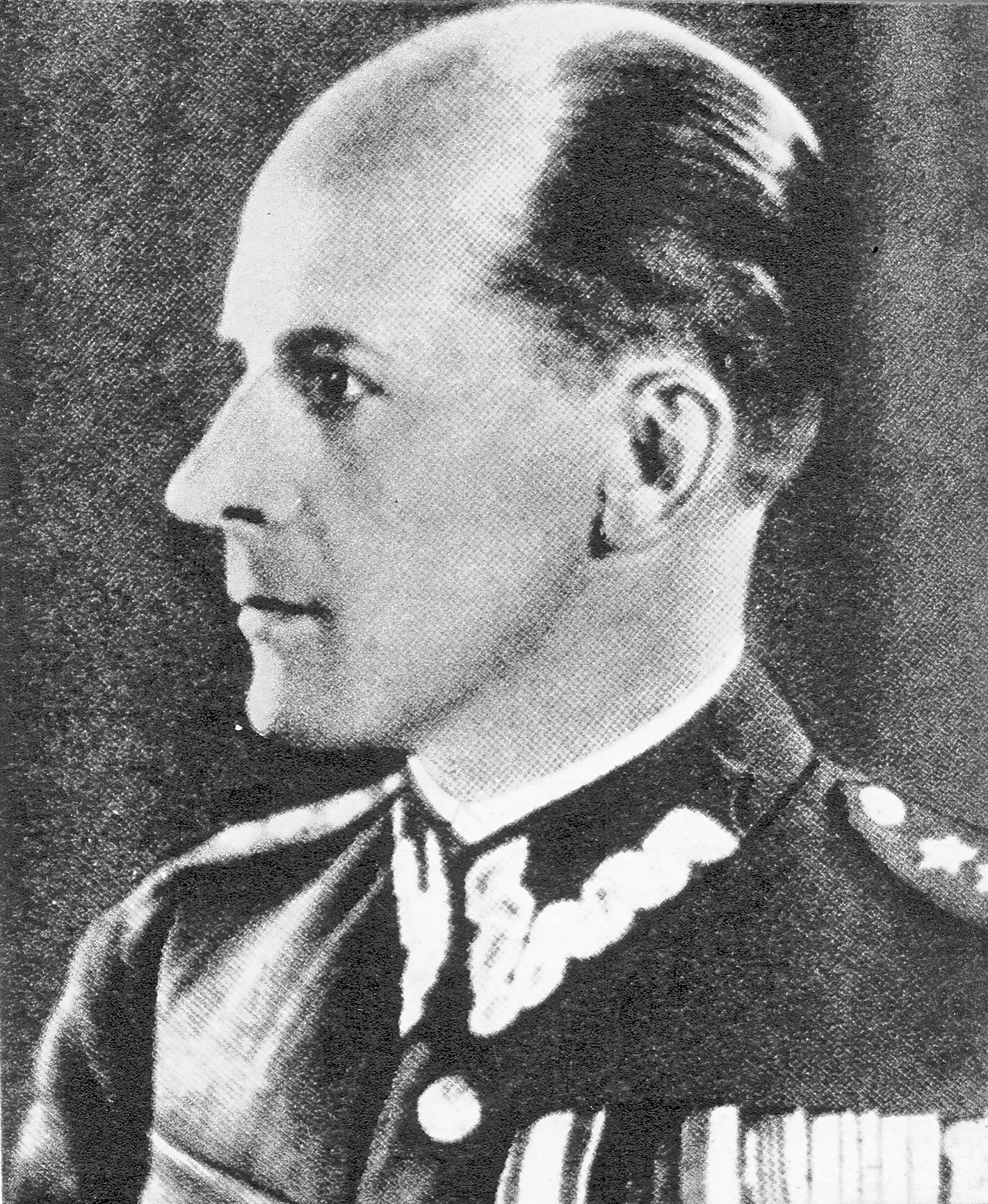

Personal information
- Born: 31 August 1893 Kielce, Russian Empire
- Died: 28 May 1942 (aged 48) Magdalenka, Poland

Sport
- Sport: Sports shooting
Medal record
Men's shooting
Representing Poland
Olympic Games
Bronze medal – third place	1936 Berlin	50 m rifle, prone

Władysław Karaś (31 August 1893 – 28 May 1942) was a Polish military officer and sport shooter who competed in the 1936 Summer Olympics. In 1936 he won the bronze medal in the 50 metre rifle prone event.

He was born in Kielce and died in Magdalenka. He was part of the Polish Resistance Army and was executed by the Germans.
