= Jenő Borovszki =

Hungarian fencer (1899–1969)

Personal information
- Born: 24 October 1899
- Died: April 1969 (aged 69)

Sport
- Sport: Fencing

Jenő Borovszki (24 October 1899 – April 1969) was a Hungarian fencer. He competed in the team épée event at the 1936 Summer Olympics.
