= Carlos Acosta (sport shooter) =

Mexican sports shooter

Personal information
- Born: 2 April 1908

Sport
- Sport: Sports shooting

Carlos Acosta (2 April 1908 – 2 November 1968) was a Mexican sports shooter. He competed in the 25 m pistol event at the 1936 Summer Olympics.
