= László Vadnay (sport shooter) =

Hungarian sports shooter

Personal information
- Born: 12 June 1898 Ungvár, Austria-Hungary
- Died: 1 December 1972 (aged 74) New York City, New York, USA

Sport
- Sport: Sports shooting

László Vadnay (12 June 1898 - 1 December 1972) was a Hungarian sports shooter. He competed in the 25 m pistol event at the 1936 Summer Olympics.
