= Ingals Fisher =

American sports shooter

Personal information
- Born: August 21, 1909 Lyons, Colorado, United States
- Died: September 1, 1942 (aged 33) Camp Lee, Virginia, United States

Sport
- Sport: Sports shooting

Clarence Ingals Fisher (August 21, 1909 – September 1, 1942) was an American sports shooter. He competed in the 25 m pistol event at the 1936 Summer Olympics.

Outside sport, Fisher became manager of a timber estate. He was a captain in the US Army during the Second World War, when he contracted meningo-encephalitis, which led to his death.
