= Alois Navratil =

Austrian sports shooter

Personal information
- Born: 17 June 1896

Sport
- Sport: Sports shooting

Alois Navratil (born 17 June 1896, date of death unknown) was an Austrian sports shooter. He competed in the 50 m rifle event at the 1936 Summer Olympics.
