= Alberto Andressen =

Portuguese sports shooter

Personal information
- Born: 30 June 1897

Sport
- Sport: Sports shooting

Alberto Andressen (born 30 June 1897, date of death unknown) was a Portuguese sports shooter. He competed in the 25 m pistol event at the 1936 Summer Olympics.
