= Andrei Abraham =

Romanian gymnast

- Alternative names: András Ábrahám; Andrew
- Born: 7 October 1916 Kolozsvár, Austria-Hungary
- Died: 20 February 1980 (aged 63) Islington, England

Gymnastics career
- Discipline: Men's artistic gymnastics
- Country represented: Romania

Andrei Abraham (7 October 1916 – 20 February 1980) was a Romanian gymnast. He competed in the 1936 Summer Olympics.
