= Edmund Pader =

Austrian swimmer (1914–1942)

Personal information
- Born: 8 March 1914 Koper, Austria-Hungary
- Died: 19 March 1942 (aged 28) Vnukovo, Oryol, Russian SSR, USSR

Sport
- Sport: Swimming

Edmund Pader (8 March 1914 – 19 March 1942) was an Austrian freestyle swimmer. He competed in three events at the 1936 Summer Olympics. A Waffen-SS Untersturmführer, Pader was killed in action on the Eastern Front of World War II.
