= Joaquim da Mota =

Portuguese sports shooter

Personal information
- Born: 29 May 1903

Sport
- Sport: Sports shooting

Joaquim da Mota (born 29 May 1903, date of death unknown) was a Portuguese sports shooter. He competed in the 25 m pistol event at the 1936 Summer Olympics.
