= Willy Røgeberg =

Norwegian sport shooter (1905–1969)

Personal information
- Born: 1 December 1905 Oslo, Norway
- Died: 15 December 1969 (aged 64) Oslo, Norway

Sport
- Sport: Sports shooting
Medal record
Men's shooting
Representing Norway
Olympic Games
Gold medal – first place	1936 Berlin	50 m rifle, prone
Bronze medal – third place	1948 London	300 m rifle, three positions
ISSF World Shooting Championships
Bronze medal – third place	1935 Roma	50 m rifle, standing
Bronze medal – third place	1935 Roma	300 m rifle, standing
Bronze medal – third place	1935 Roma	50 m rifle, kneeling

Willy Røgeberg (1 December 1905 – 15 December 1969) was a Norwegian rifle shooter who competed before and after World War II.

== Career ==
After his Olympic medal in 1936 he started his own guns and sporting equipment business in Oslo.

=== Medals and awards ===
He won two Olympic medals. He won his first Olympic medal in 50 m Rifle, prone at the 1936 Summer Olympics in Berlin. After the war he won a bronze medal at the 1948 Summer Olympics in London, this time in 300 m Rifle, Three positions. He also won several medals in the ISSF World Shooting Championships.

== Imprisonment ==
During the Second World War German occupation of Norway, Røgeberg was arrested by the Germans on 29 May 1942 on weapons related charges. He was imprisoned at Møllergata 19 from 29 May to 5 October, 1942, and then at Grini concentration camp as prisoner no. 4776 from 5 October 1942 to 22 December 1943.
