= Lazar Jovanović (sport shooter) =

Yugoslav sports shooter

Personal information
- Born: 1898 Belgrade, Kingdom of Serbia
- Died: 28 January 1975 (aged 76–77) Belgrade, SFR Yugoslavia

Sport
- Sport: Sports shooting

Lazar Jovanović (1898 – 28 January 1975) was a Yugoslav sport shooter. He competed in the 25 m pistol event at the 1936 Summer Olympics.
