= Günther Zobernig =

Austrian swimmer (1915–1945)

Günther Karl Ernst Zobernig
Personal information
- Born: 5 December 1915 Klagenfurt, Austria-Hungary
- Died: 8 May 1945 (aged 29) Klagenfurt, Allied-occupied Austria

Sport
- Sport: Swimming

Günther Zobernig (5 December 1915 – 8 May 1945) was an Austrian freestyle swimmer. He competed in two events at the 1936 Summer Olympics. He was killed in action during World War II.
