= Theodor Janisch =

Austrian sports shooter

Personal information
- Born: 1 February 1902

Sport
- Sport: Sports shooting

Theodor Janisch (1 February 1902 – 1940) was an Austrian sports shooter. He competed in the 50 m rifle event at the 1936 Summer Olympics.
