= Giancarlo Brusati =

Italian fencer (1910–2001)

Personal information
- Born: 6 March 1910 Milan, Italy
- Died: 30 June 2001 (aged 91) Barlassina, Italy

Sport
- Sport: Fencing
Medal record
Men's fencing
Representing Italy
Olympic Games
Gold medal – first place	1936 Berlin	Épée, team

Giancarlo Brusati (6 March 1910 – 30 June 2001) was an Italian fencer. He won a gold medal in the team épée event at the 1936 Summer Olympics. He was the President of the Fédération Internationale d'Escrime from 1981 to 1984.
