= Durrette =

Durrette is a surname. It may refer to:

- Mike Durrette (born 1957), American football player (offensive lineman) in the NFL
- Wyatt Durrette (politician) (born 1938), American attorney and politician, who served in the Virginia House of Representatives
- Wyatt Durrette (songwriter), born Wyatt B. Durrette III, American country music songwriter
