= Endre A. Vadnay =

Hungarian-American writer (1902–1969)

Endre A. Vadnay (August 3, 1902 – December 3, 1969) was a Hungarian-born writer and the brother of Hollywood screenwriter László Vadnay. A Budapest native and University of Agriculture alumnus who later became owner-editor of the newspaper Reggeli Vjsag, Vadnay left Hungary after the Revolution of 1956. He did work for Radio Free Europe and, in 1958, founded the Hungarian Theatre in New York. Also that year, one of his stories formed the basis for his brother's screenplay for "War Against War," a critically acclaimed episode of ABC's anthology series Telephone Time, starring Hume Cronyn and Jessica Tandy as Alfred Nobel and Bertha von Suttner. (Note: Although both the New York Times' and the Record's obituaries maintain that Vadnay received an Emmy nomination for "War Against War", there appears to be no evidence, whether in contemporaneous news reports or via https://www.emmys.com/awards/nominees-winners/, to support that claim.)

On December 3, 1969, Vadnay died at Holy Name Hospital in Teaneck, New Jersey at age 67.
