= Marie Šedivá =

Czech fencer (1908–1975)

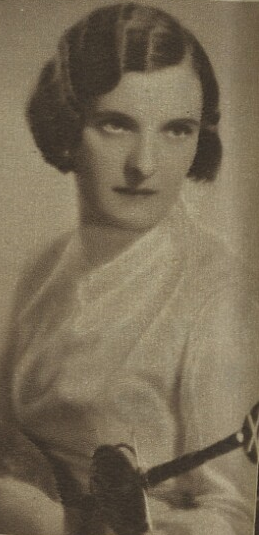

Personal information
- Born: 12 October 1908
- Died: 13 December 1975 (aged 67) Prague, Czechoslovakia

Sport
- Sport: Fencing

Marie Šedivá (née Krůbová; 12 October 1908 – 13 December 1975) was a Czechoslovak fencer. She competed in the women's individual foil event at the 1936 Summer Olympics. At the 1938 World Fencing Championships in Piešťany, she won the women's individual foil competition.
