= Franz Seltenheim =

Austrian swimmer

Personal information
- Born: 4 June 1914
- Died: 1 April 1997 (aged 82)

Sport
- Sport: Swimming

Franz Seltenheim (4 June 1914 – 1 April 1997) was an Austrian freestyle swimmer. He competed in two events at the 1936 Summer Olympics.
