= Mihai Ionescu-Călinești =

Romanian sports shooter

Personal information
- Born: 5 February 1897

Sport
- Sport: Sports shooting

Mihai Ionescu-Călinești (born 5 February 1897, date of death unknown) was a Romanian sports shooter. He competed in the 50 m rifle event at the 1936 Summer Olympics.
