= Alfredo Pezzana =

Italian fencer (1893–1986)

Personal information
- Born: 31 March 1893 Turin, Italy
- Died: 7 May 1986 (aged 93) Turin, Italy

Sport
- Sport: Fencing
Medal record
Men's fencing
Representing Italy
Olympic Games
Gold medal – first place	1936 Berlin	Épée, team

Alfredo Pezzana (31 March 1893 – 7 May 1986) was an Italian fencer. He won a gold medal in the team épée event at the 1936 Summer Olympics.
