= Bruno Giacconi =

Italian sports shooter

Personal information
- Born: 20 November 1889 Osimo, Italy
- Died: 25 February 1957 (aged 67) Sondrio, Italy

Sport
- Sport: Sports shooting

Bruno Giacconi (20 November 1889 – 25 February 1957) was an Italian sports shooter. He competed in the 25 m pistol event at the 1936 Summer Olympics. He was also active in politics and supported the Italian Social Republic, becoming president of the Province of Sondrio in 1944.
