= Raymond Stasse =

Belgian fencer

Personal information
- Born: 30 April 1913 Mbandaka, Democratic Republic of Congo
- Died: 9 July 1987 (aged 74)

Sport
- Sport: Fencing

Raymond Stasse (30 April 1913 – 9 July 1987) was a Belgian Olympic fencer. He competed at the 1936 and 1948 Summer Olympics.
