= Hervé du Monceau de Bergendael =

Belgian fencer

Personal information
- Full name: Hervé, Count du Monceau de Bergendael
- Born: 13 April 1910 Izegem, Belgium
- Died: 20 January 1977 (aged 66) Uccle, Belgium

Sport
- Sport: Fencing

Hervé du Monceau de Bergendael (13 April 1910 – 20 January 1977) was a Belgian fencer. He competed in the individual and team épée events at the 1936 Summer Olympics.
