= Carlos Queiroz (sport shooter) =

Portuguese sports shooter (1902–1978)

Personal information
- Full name: Carlos Botelho Machado de Queirós
- Born: 12 April 1902 Porto, Portugal
- Died: 8 May 1978 (aged 76) Porto, Portugal

Sport
- Country: Portugal
- Sport: Sports shooting

Carlos Botelho Machado de Queirós (12 April 1902 – 8 May 1978) was a Portuguese sports shooter. He competed at the 1936 Summer Olympics and 1948 Summer Olympics. Queiroz died in Porto on 8 May 1978, at the age of 76.

== Olympic career ==
Event	Place	Hits	Score
1936 Summer Olympics
25 metre pistol	Did not advance past first round	Unknown	Unknown
50 metre rifle	11th	Unknown	292
1948 Summer Olympics
25 metre pistol	54th	55	489
50 metre pistol	46th	Unknown	482
50 metre rifle	63rd	Unknown	572
