= Ioan Miclescu-Prăjescu =

Romanian fencer

Personal information
- Born: 17 June 1892

Sport
- Sport: Fencing

Ioan Miclescu-Prăjescu (17 June 1892 – 1973) was a Romanian fencer. He competed in the individual épée event at the 1936 Summer Olympics.
