= Vilém Jakl =

Czech cyclist

Personal information
- Born: 22 February 1915

Cycling career
- Sport: Cycling

Vilém Jakl (born 22 February 1915, date of death unknown) was a Czechoslovak cyclist. He competed in the individual and team road race events at the 1936 Summer Olympics.
