= Alfred Klausnitzer =

Czech fencer

Personal information
- Born: 4 July 1900 Litvínov, Austria-Hungary
- Died: 30 December 1958 (aged 58) Munich, West Germany

Sport
- Country: Czechoslovakia
- Sport: Fencing
- Event: Épée

Alfred Klausnitzer (4 July 1900 – 30 December 1958) was a Czech fencer. He competed for Czechoslovakia in the team épée event at the 1936 Summer Olympics.
