= Cornelis Weber =

Dutch fencer (1899–1995)

Personal information
- Born: 7 December 1899 Banda Aceh, Dutch East Indies
- Died: 28 May 1995 (aged 95) Heemstede, Kingdom of the Netherlands

Sport
- Sport: Fencing

Cornelis Weber (7 December 1899 – 28 May 1995) was a Dutch fencer. He competed in the individual and team épée events at the 1936 Summer Olympics.
