= Hervarth Frass von Friedenfeldt =

Czechosloak fencer

Personal information
- Born: 26 May 1913 Austria-Hungary
- Died: 20 September 1941 (aged 28) Protectorate of Bohemia and Moravia

Sport
- Country: Czechoslovakia
- Sport: Fencing
- Event(s): Sabre, Foil

Hervarth Frass von Friedenfeldt (26 May 1913 – 20 September 1941) was a Czechoslovak fencer and an Olympian. He competed in the individual and team foil and sabre events at the 1936 Summer Olympics.
