= Josef Hildebrand (fencer) =

Czech fencer

Personal information
- Born: 7 May 1895

Sport
- Sport: Fencing

Josef Hildebrand (born 7 May 1895, date of death unknown) was a Czech fencer. He competed in the team foil and sabre events at the 1936 Summer Olympics.
