= Alfred Hämmerle =

Austrian sports shooter

Personal information
- Born: 26 July 1892

Sport
- Sport: Sports shooting

Alfred Hämmerle (26 July 1892 – 2 April 1959) was an Austrian sports shooter. He competed in the 50 m rifle event at the 1936 Summer Olympics.
