= Eduardo Santos (sport shooter) =

Portuguese sports shooter

Personal information
- Born: 29 June 1899

Sport
- Sport: Sports shooting

Eduardo Santos (born 29 June 1899, date of death unknown) was a Portuguese sports shooter. He competed in the 50 m rifle event at the 1936 Summer Olympics.
