= František Pokorný =

Czech sport shooter

Personal information
- Born: 4 June 1905

Sport
- Sport: Sport shooting

František Pokorný (4 June 1905 – ?) was a Czech sport shooter. He competed for Czechoslovakia in two events at the 1936 Summer Olympics.
