= Jean Hauert =

Swiss fencer

Personal information
- Born: 30 October 1911
- Died: March 1988 (aged 76)

Sport
- Sport: Fencing

Jean Hauert (30 October 1911 – March 1988) was a Swiss épée fencer. He competed at the 1936 and 1948 Summer Olympics.
