= Václav Rais =

Czech fencer

Personal information
- Born: 20 April 1910 Litvínov, Austria-Hungary
- Died: 20 August 1985 (aged 75) Janová, Czechoslovakia

Sport
- Sport: Fencing

Václav Rais (20 April 1910 – 20 August 1985) was a Czech fencer. He competed in the team épée event at the 1936 Summer Olympics.

His sister, Carmen Raisová, was also a fencer.
