= François Duret =

Swiss fencer

Personal information
- Born: 10 January 1911

Sport
- Sport: Fencing

François Duret (born 10 January 1911, date of death unknown) was a Swiss fencer. He competed in the individual épée event at the 1936 Summer Olympics.
