= Gheorghe Mirea =

Romanian sports shooter (1908–1980)

Personal information
- Born: 7 March 1908
- Died: October 1980 (aged 72)

Sport
- Sport: Sports shooting

Gheorghe Mirea (7 March 1908 – October 1980) was a Romanian sports shooter. He competed in the 50 m rifle event at the 1936 Summer Olympics.
