= Denis Dolecsko =

Romanian fencer

Personal information
- Born: 5 December 1903
- Died: 6 April 1938 (aged 34)

Sport
- Sport: Fencing

Denis Dolecsko (5 December 1903 – 6 April 1938) was a Romanian fencer. He competed at the 1928 and 1936 Summer Olympics.
