= Michel Pécheux =

French fencer (1911–1985)

Olympic medal record

Men's fencing

Representing France
Gold medal – first place	1948 London	Team épée
Bronze medal – third place	1936 Berlin	Team épée

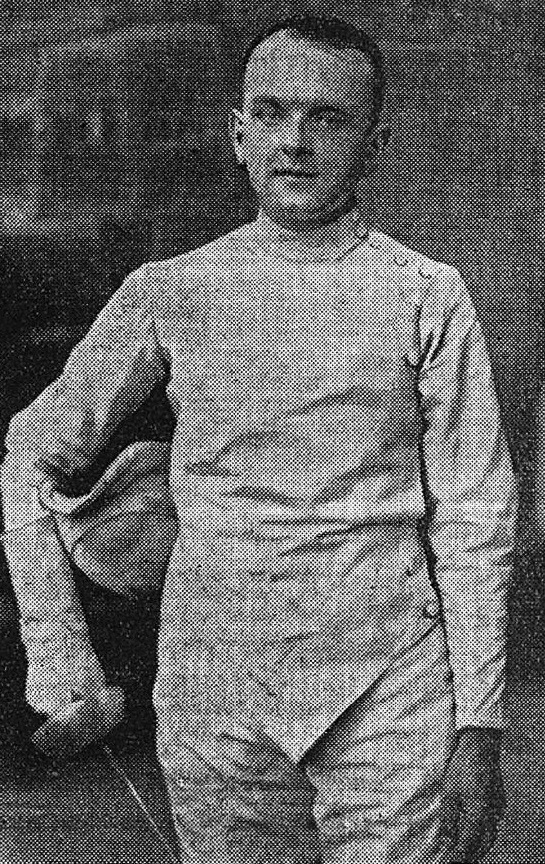
Michel Pécheux in 1938.

Michel Pécheux (24 May 1911 – 29 August 1985) was a French fencer.

Pécheux competed in the Men's Team Épée event at the 1936 Summer Olympics, winning a bronze medal for France. He was a team gold medalist at London in 1948, once again in épée.
