= Hans Schönbaumsfeld =

Austrian fencer

Personal information
- Born: 5 March 1900
- Died: March 1972 (aged 71–72)

Sport
- Sport: Fencing

Hans Schönbaumsfeld (5 March 1900 – March 1972) was an Austrian fencer. He competed at the 1928 and 1936 Summer Olympics.
