= Hugo Weczerek =

Austrian fencer

Personal information
- Born: 17 December 1909
- Died: 14 December 1984 (aged 74)

Sport
- Sport: Fencing

Hugo Weczerek (17 December 1909 – 14 December 1984) was an Austrian fencer. He competed in the team épée and sabre events at the 1936 Summer Olympics. He also represented Klagenfurter AC.
