= Gustavo Carinhas =

Portuguese fencer

Personal information
- Born: 4 July 1908
- Died: 12 November 1980 (aged 72)

Sport
- Sport: Fencing

Gustavo Carinhas (4 July 1908 – 12 November 1980) was a Portuguese fencer. He competed in the individual and team épée events at the 1936 Summer Olympics.
