= František Vohryzek =

Czech fencer

Personal information
- Born: 9 January 1907 Prague, Austria-Hungary
- Died: 27 January 1997 (aged 90) Montréal, Québec, Canada

Sport
- Sport: Fencing

František Vohryzek (9 January 1907 – 27 January 1997) was a Czechoslovak fencer. He competed in the individual and team épée and the team foil events at the 1936 Summer Olympics.
