= Josef Kunt =

Czech fencer

Personal information
- Born: 4 June 1904
- Died: 4 October 1982 (aged 78)

Sport
- Sport: Fencing

Josef Kunt (4 June 1904 – 4 October 1982) was a Czechoslovak fencer. He competed in the individual and team épée events at the 1936 Summer Olympics.
