= Karl Hanisch =

Austrian fencer

Personal information
- Born: 20 January 1900
- Died: 5 March 1957 (aged 57)

Sport
- Sport: Fencing

Karl Hanisch (20 January 1900 – 5 March 1957) was an Austrian Olympic fencer. He competed in the individual and team épée and team sabre events at the 1936 Summer Olympics.
