= Robert Bergmann =

Czech fencer

Personal information
- Born: 17 February 1905

Sport
- Sport: Fencing

Robert Bergmann (born 17 February 1905, date of death unknown) was a Czechoslovak fencer. He competed in the individual and team épée events at the 1936 Summer Olympics.
