= Franco Riccardi =

Italian fencer

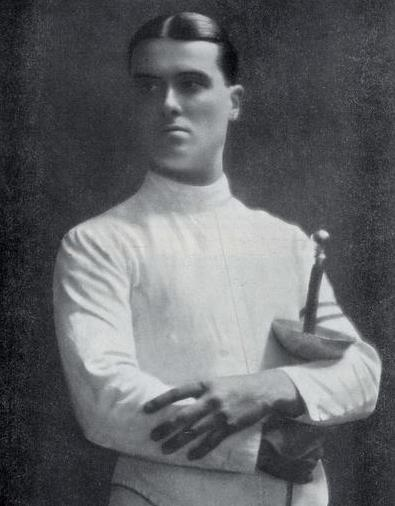

Personal information
- Born: 13 June 1905 Milano
- Died: 23 May 1968 (aged 62)
Medal record
Representing Italy
Men's Fencing
Olympic Games
Gold medal – first place	1928 Amsterdam	Épée Team
Gold medal – first place	1936 Berlin	Épée Individual
Gold medal – first place	1936 Berlin	Épée Team
Silver medal – second place	1932 Los Angeles	Épée Team

Franco Riccardi (13 June 1905 – 23 May 1968) was an Italian fencer and Olympic champion in the épée competition.

== Biography ==
He received a gold medal in épée individual at the 1936 Summer Olympics in Berlin. He received a gold medal in épée team in 1928 and in 1936, and a silver medal in 1932.
