= Bohuslav Kirchmann =

Czech fencer (1902–1990)

Personal information
- Born: 15 April 1902 Slezská Ostrava, Austria-Hungary
- Died: 24 January 1990 (aged 87) Prague, Czechoslovakia

Sport
- Sport: Fencing

Bohuslav Kirchmann (15 April 1902 – 24 January 1990) was a Czech military officer and fencer. He competed in five events at the 1936 Summer Olympics, representing Czechoslovakia.

== Biography ==
Kirchmann was born on 15 April 1902 in Slezská Ostrava, Austria-Hungary (now Ostrava, Czech Republic). He died on 24 January 1990 in Prague.
