= Rudolf Weber (fencer) =

Austrian fencer

Personal information
- Full name: Rudolf Franz Weber
- Born: 4 April 1903 Vienna, Austria-Hungary

Sport
- Sport: Fencing

Rudolf Weber (born 4 April 1903, date of death unknown) was an Austrian fencer. He competed in the individual and team épée events at the 1936 Summer Olympics.
