= Roman Fischer (fencer) =

Austrian fencer

Personal information
- Born: 3 August 1915

Sport
- Sport: Fencing

Roman Fischer (born 3 August 1915, date of death unknown) was an Austrian fencer. He competed in the individual and team épée and the team foil events at the 1936 Summer Olympics. Fischer was also the Austrian national foil champion in 1937, and a year later, he also became the German foil champion.
