= Fencing at the 1936 Summer Olympics – Women's foil =

Olympic fencing tournament

Women's foil at the Games of the XI Olympiad
- Venue: Imperial Sports Field, Berlin
- Dates: 4 – 5 August 1936
- Competitors: 41 from 17 nations

Medalists
1st place, gold medalist(s)		Ilona Elek-Schacherer	Hungary
2nd place, silver medalist(s)		Helene Mayer	Germany
3rd place, bronze medalist(s)		Ellen Müller-Preis	Austria

The women's foil was one of seven fencing events on the fencing at the 1936 Summer Olympics programme. It was the fourth appearance of the event. The competition was held from 4 August 1936 to 5 August 1936. 41 fencers from 17 nations competed, with one additional fencer entered but withdrawing. Nations were limited to three fencers.

The competition format was pool play round-robin, with bouts to five touches. Not all bouts were played in some pools if not necessary to determine advancement. Two points were awarded for each bout won. Ties were broken through fence-off bouts in early rounds if necessary for determining advancement, but by touches received in final rounds (and for non-advancement-necessary placement in earlier rounds).

== Results ==
=== Round 1 ===
The top 4 finishers in each pool advanced to round 2.

==== Pool 1 ====
Rank	Fencer	Nation	Points	Wins	Losses	TS	TR	Notes
1	Ilona Elek-Schacherer	Hungary	8	4	0	20	5	Q
2	Elisabeth Grasser	Austria	8	4	1	24	13	Q
3	Denise Kramer-Scholer	Switzerland	8	4	1	21	15	Q
4	Toos van der Klaauw	Netherlands	6	3	2	16	15	Q
5	Joanna de Tuscan	United States	2	1	4	15	21	
6	Carmen Raisová	Czechoslovakia	2	1	4	15	23	
7	Andrée Boisson	France	0	0	5	6	25	

==== Pool 2 ====
Rank	Fencer	Nation	Points	Wins	Losses	TS	TR	Notes
1	Helene Mayer	Germany	12	6	0	30	6	Q
2	Erna Bogen-Bogáti	Hungary	10	5	1	27	18	Q
3	Margit Kristian	Yugoslavia	8	4	2	25	21	Q
4	Hilda von Puttkammer	Brazil	6	3	3	19	20	Q
5	Berit Granquist	Sweden	4	2	4	20	26	
6	Betty Carnegy-Arbuthnott	Great Britain	0	0	5	12	25	
6	Nancy Archibald	Canada	0	0	5	8	25	

==== Pool 3 ====
Rank	Fencer	Nation	Points	Wins	Losses	TS	TR	Notes
1	Karen Lachmann	Denmark	8	4	1	21	11	Q
2	Marion Lloyd	United States	6	3	2	19	15	Q
3	Adèle Christiaens	Belgium	6	3	2	19	17	Q
4	Olga Oelkers	Germany	6	3	2	20	18	Q
5	Marie Šedivá	Czechoslovakia	4	2	3	14	20	
6	Marguerite Reuche	Great Britain	0	0	5	13	25	

==== Pool 4 ====
Scheel won the play-off between herself, Aşani, and Thomas. It is unclear why Aşani did not face Vargha; in general, matches unnecessary to determine qualification were not played (and this reason is given in the official report, but Aşani would have advanced without the need for a play-off pool had she had the opportunity to, and successfully did, beat Vargha.

Rank	Fencer	Nation	Points	Wins	Losses	TS	TR	Notes
1	Hedwig Haß	Germany	12	6	0	30	5	Q
2	Ulla Barding-Poulsen	Denmark	8	4	1	21	11	Q
3	Ilona Vargha	Hungary	6	3	1	17	9	Q
4	Ingeborg Scheel	Switzerland	4	2	4	14	24	Q
5	Suat Aşani	Turkey	4	2	3	16	18	
6	Aileen Thomas	Canada	4	2	4	20	28	
7	Thea Kellner	Romania	0	0	6	7	30	

==== Pool 5 ====
Rank	Fencer	Nation	Points	Wins	Losses	TS	TR	Notes
1	Ellen Müller-Preis	Austria	10	5	0	25	7	Q
2	Agathe Turgis	France	6	3	1	19	12	Q
3	Madeleine Scrève	Belgium	6	3	1	17	12	Q
4	Grete Olsen	Denmark	6	3	1	17	15	Q
5	Yvonne Bornand	Switzerland	2	1	4	13	21	
6	Ebba Gripenstedt	Sweden	4	2	4	18	28	
7	Halet Çambel	Turkey	0	0	5	10	25	

==== Pool 6 ====
Rank	Fencer	Nation	Points	Wins	Losses	TS	TR	Notes
1	Fritzi Wenisch-Filz	Austria	10	5	0	25	9	Q
2	Jenny Addams	Belgium	8	4	1	24	14	Q
3	Judy Guinness	Great Britain	6	3	3	22	23	Q
4	Dorothy Locke	United States	6	3	3	22	24	Q
5	Ivka Tavčar	Yugoslavia	4	2	4	22	24	
6	Gerda Gantz	Romania	4	2	4	15	24	
7	Kathleen Hughes-Hallett	Canada	2	1	5	16	27	

=== Round 2 ===
The top 3 finishers in each pool advanced to the semifinals.

==== Pool 1 ====
Locke defeated Bogen-Bogáti in the tie-breaker bout, repeating the result of the pool bout between the two.

Rank	Fencer	Nation	Points	Wins	Losses	TS	TR	Notes
1	Elisabeth Grasser	Austria	10	5	0	25	15	Q
2	Jenny Addams	Belgium	8	4	1	24	14	Q
3	Dorothy Locke	United States	4	2	3	20	20	Q
4	Erna Bogen-Bogáti	Hungary	4	2	3	19	21	
5	Ulla Barding-Poulsen	Denmark	2	1	4	16	24	
5	Ingeborg Scheel	Switzerland	2	1	4	14	24	

==== Pool 2 ====
Rank	Fencer	Nation	Points	Wins	Losses	TS	TR	Notes
1	Ellen Müller-Preis	Austria	10	5	0	25	11	Q
2	Judy Guinness Penn-Hughes	Great Britain	8	4	1	24	19	Q
3	Olga Oelkers	Germany	6	3	2	23	16	Q
4	Grete Olsen	Denmark	4	2	3	19	22	
5	Margit Kristian	Yugoslavia	2	1	4	13	22	
6	Adèle Christiaens	Belgium	0	0	5	11	25	

==== Pool 3 ====
Rank	Fencer	Nation	Points	Wins	Losses	TS	TR	Notes
1	Helene Mayer	Germany	8	4	0	20	2	Q
2	Marion Lloyd	United States	6	3	1	16	12	Q
3	Ilona Vargha	Hungary	6	3	1	18	15	Q
4	Madeleine Scrève	Belgium	2	1	3	10	15	
5	Fritzi Wenisch-Filz	Austria	2	1	3	13	16	
6	Hilda von Puttkammer	Brazil	0	0	5	11	25	

==== Pool 4 ====
Elek-Schacherer won the play-off against van der Klaauw. The bout between Elek-Schacherer and Kramer-Scholer is shown in the official report as a 5–5 bout with neither given credit for a win; this score is generally not possible under the competition format in use but the official report contains no explanation of the result.

Rank	Fencer	Nation	Points	Wins	Losses	TS	TR	Notes
1	Hedwig Haß	Germany	10	5	0	25	6	Q
2	Karen Lachmann	Denmark	8	4	1	21	9	Q
3	Ilona Elek-Schacherer	Hungary	4	2	3	20	19	Q
4	Toos van der Klaauw	Netherlands	4	2	3	15	23	
5	Denise Kramer-Scholer	Switzerland	2	1	4	15	21	
6	Agathe Turgis	France	0	0	5	7	25	

=== Semifinals ===
The top 4 finishers in each pool advanced to the final.

==== Semifinal 1 ====
Locke defeated Bogen-Bogáti in the tie-breaker bout, repeating the result of the pool bout between the two.

Rank	Fencer	Nation	Points	Wins	Losses	TS	TR	Notes
1	Jenny Addams	Belgium	6	3	1	18	10	Q
2	Ellen Müller-Preis	Austria	6	3	1	19	13	Q
2	Ilona Vargha	Hungary	6	3	1	17	13	Q
4	Hedwig Haß	Germany	4	2	2	16	16	Q
5	Marion Lloyd	United States	2	1	4	19	20	
6	Olga Oelkers	Germany	2	1	4	7	24	

==== Semifinal 2 ====
Rank	Fencer	Nation	Points	Wins	Losses	TS	TR	Notes
1	Ilona Elek-Schacherer	Hungary	10	5	0	25	10	Q
2	Helene Mayer	Germany	8	4	1	21	11	Q
3	Elisabeth Grasser	Austria	4	2	3	19	17	Q
3	Karen Lachmann	Denmark	4	2	3	17	17	Q
5	Dorothy Locke	United States	2	1	4	8	21	
6	Judy Guinness Penn-Hughes	Great Britain	2	1	4	10	24	

=== Final ===
The final eight fencers competed in a round-robin. Ties, including the three-way tie for second, were broken by touches received in this round rather than play-off bouts as in previous rounds.

Rank	Fencer	Nation	Points	Wins	Losses	TS	TR
1st place, gold medalist(s)	Ilona Elek-Schacherer	Hungary	12	6	1	33	17
2nd place, silver medalist(s)	Helene Mayer	Germany	10	5	2	33	19
3rd place, bronze medalist(s)	Ellen Müller-Preis	Austria	10	5	2	32	20
4	Hedwig Haß	Germany	10	5	2	30	23
5	Karen Lachmann	Denmark	6	3	4	23	24
6	Jenny Addams	Belgium	4	2	5	18	28
7	Ilona Vargha	Hungary	4	2	5	17	31
8	Elisabeth Grasser	Austria	0	0	7	11	35
