= Fencing at the 1924 Summer Olympics – Women's foil =

Women's foil at the Games of the VIII Olympiad
- Venue: Vélodrome d'hiver
- Dates: July 2–4, 1924
- Competitors: 25 from 9 nations

Medalists
1st place, gold medalist(s)		Ellen Osiier	Denmark
2nd place, silver medalist(s)		Gladys Davis	Great Britain
3rd place, bronze medalist(s)		Grete Heckscher	Denmark

The women's foil was one of seven fencing events on the Fencing at the 1924 Summer Olympics programme. It was the first time an Olympic fencing competition was held for women.

The competition was held from Tuesday July 2, 1924, to Thursday July 4, 1924. 25 fencers from 9 nations competed.

== Results ==
=== Quarterfinals ===
The top three fencers in each pool advanced. Bouts were to five touches. Times touched was the first tie-breaker if fencers had equal records for their bouts.

==== Pool A ====
Pos	Fencer	W	L	TF	TA	Qual.	EO	GD	EF	EH	YC	IH	JS-dJ
1	Ellen Osiier (DEN)	6	0	30	10	Q		5–2	5–4	5–0	5–3	5–1	5–0
2	Gladys Davis (GBR)	4	2	24	17	Q	2–5		5–2	5–3	5–2	2–5	5–0
3	Emma Fitting (SUI)	3	3	24	22	Q	4–5	2–5		3–5	5–2	5–4	5–1
4	Elsa Hellquist (SWE)	3	3	22	23		0–5	3–5	5–3		4–5	5–4	5–1
5	Yvonne Conte (FRA)	3	3	22	25		3–5	2–5	2–5	5–4		5–4	5–2
6	Irma Hopper (USA)	2	4	23	24		1–5	5–2	4–5	4–5	4–5		5–2
7	Johanna Stokhuyzen-de Jong (NED)	0	6	6	30		0–5	0–5	1–5	1–5	2–5	2–5	

==== Pool B ====
Pos	Fencer	W	L	TF	TA	Qual.	LP	MF	HO	IB	AA-M	JM
1	Lucie Prost (FRA)	4	1	24	10	Q		4–5	5–2	5–0	5–2	5–1
2	Muriel Freeman (GBR)	4	1	24	12	Q	5–4		4–5	5–1	5–1	5–3
3	Hanna Olsen (SWE)	3	2	18	17	Q	2–5	5–4		1–5	5–1	5–2
4	Ingeborg Buhl (DEN)	2	3	15	20		0–5	1–5	5–1		5–4	4–5
5	Adriana Admiraal-Meijerink (NED)	1	4	13	22		2–5	1–5	1–5	4–5		5–2
6	Jeanne Morgenthaler (SUI)	1	4	13	24		1–5	3–5	2–5	5–4	2–5	

==== Pool C ====
Pos	Fencer	W	L	TF	TA	Qual.	GD	EH	JB	MB	JdB	WD
1	Gladys Daniell (GBR)	5	0	25	6	Q		5–1	5–3	5–0	5–2	5–0
2	Ellen Hamilton (SWE)	3	2	19	14	Q	1–5		3–5	5–2	5–1	5–1
3	Yutta Barding (DEN)	3	2	22	15	Q	3–5	5–3		4–5	5–2	5–0
4	Marcelle Bory (FRA)	3	2	17	18		0–5	2–5	5–4		5–3	5–1
5	Johanna de Boer (NED)	1	4	13	20		2–5	1–5	2–5	3–5		5–0
6	Wanda Dubieńska (POL)	0	5	2	25		0–5	1–5	0–5	1–5	0–5	

==== Pool D ====
Pos	Fencer	W	L	TF	TA	Qual.	GH	FT	GT	AG	SB	AW
1	Grete Heckscher (DEN)	5	0	25	10	Q		5–1	5–0	5–4	5–3	5–2
2	Fernande Tassy (FRA)	3	2	20	17	Q	1–5		4–5	5–2	5–2	5–3
3	Gizella Tary (HUN)	3	2	17	20	Q	0–5	5–4		5–4	2–5	5–2
4	Adelaide Gehrig (USA)	2	3	20	22		4–5	2–5	4–5		5–4	5–3
5	S. Bonnard (SUI)	1	4	17	22		3–5	2–5	5–2	4–5		3–5
6	Alice Walker (GBR)	1	4	15	23		2–5	3–5	2–5	3–5	5–3	

=== Semifinals ===
The top three fencers in each pool advanced. Bouts were to five touches. Times touched was the first tie-breaker if fencers had equal records for their bouts.

==== Pool A ====
Pos	Fencer	W	L	TF	TA	Qual.	EO	MF	YB	HO	GD	FT
1	Ellen Osiier (DEN)	5	0	25	10	Q		5–2	5–1	5–2	5–3	5–2
2	Muriel Freeman (GBR)	4	1	22	15	Q	2–5		5–1	5–2	5–4	5–3
3	Yutta Barding (DEN)	2	3	16	19	Q	1–5	1–5		5–3	5–1	4–5
4	Hanna Olsen (SWE)	2	3	17	20		2–5	2–5	3–5		5–4	5–1
5	Gladys Daniell (GBR)	1	4	17	20		3–5	4–5	1–5	4–5		5–0
6	Fernande Tassy (FRA)	1	4	11	24		2–5	3–5	5–4	1–5	0–5	

==== Pool B ====
Pos	Fencer	W	L	TF	TA	Qual.	GD	GH	GT	LP	EF	EH
1	Gladys Davis (GBR)	5	0	25	15	Q		5–4	5–2	5–4	5–3	5–2
2	Grete Heckscher (DEN)	4	1	24	10	Q	4–5		5–1	5–2	5–1	5–1
3	Gizella Tary (HUN)	3	2	18	18	Q	2–5	1–5		5–3	5–4	5–1
4	Lucie Prost (FRA)	2	3	19	18		4–5	2–5	3–5		5–3	5–0
5	Emma Fitting (SUI)	1	4	16	23		3–5	1–5	4–5	3–5		5–3
6	Ellen Hamilton (SWE)	0	5	6	25		1–5	1–5	1–5	0–5	3–5	

=== Final ===
Bouts were to five touches.

Pos	Fencer	W	L	TF	TA	EO	GD	GH	MF	YB	GT
1st place, gold medalist(s)	Ellen Osiier (DEN)	5	0	25	14		5–3	5–3	5–2	5–4	5–2
2nd place, silver medalist(s)	Gladys Davis (GBR)	4	1	23	16	3–5		5–4	5–2	5–4	5–1
3rd place, bronze medalist(s)	Grete Heckscher (DEN)	3	2	22	16	3–5	4–5		5–3	5–3	5–0
4	Muriel Freeman (GBR)	2	3	17	19	2–5	2–5	3–5		5–3	5–1
5	Yutta Barding (DEN)	1	4	19	22	4–5	4–5	3–5	3–5		5–2
6	Gizella Tary (HUN)	0	5	6	25	2–5	1–5	0–5	1–5	2–5	
