= Fencing at the 1928 Summer Olympics – Women's foil =

Olympic fencing event

Women's foil at the Games of the IX Olympiad
- Venue: Schermzaal
- Dates: 31 July–1 August 1928
- Competitors: 27 from 11 nations

Medalists
1st place, gold medalist(s)		Helene Mayer	Germany
2nd place, silver medalist(s)		Muriel Freeman	Great Britain
3rd place, bronze medalist(s)		Olga Oelkers	Germany

The women's foil was one of seven fencing events on the Fencing at the 1928 Summer Olympics programme. It was the second appearance of the event. The competition was held from 31 July 1928 to 1 August 1928. 27 fencers from 11 nations competed.

== Results ==
Source: Official results; De Wael

=== Round 1 ===
Each pool was a round-robin. Bouts were to five touches. The top four fencers in each pool advanced to the semifinals.

==== Pool A ====
Rank	Fencer	Nation	Wins	Notes
1	Muriel Freeman	Great Britain	5	Q
2	Helene Mayer	Germany	5	Q
3	Marion Lloyd	United States	4	Q
4	Jeanne Morgenthaler	Switzerland	3	Q
5	Edith Addams	Belgium	3	
6	Marguerite Reuche	France	1	
7	Hanna Olsen	Sweden	0	

==== Pool B ====
Rank	Fencer	Nation	Wins	Notes
1	Erna Sondheim	Germany	5	Q
2	Margit Danÿ	Hungary	5	Q
3	Peggy Butler	Great Britain	3	Q
4	Adriana Admiraal-Meijerink	Netherlands	3	Q
5	Hilda Deswarte	Belgium	2	
6	Inger Klint	Denmark	2	
7	Oda Mahaut	France	1	

==== Pool C ====
Rank	Fencer	Nation	Wins	Notes
1	Jo de Boer	Netherlands	5	Q
2	Jarmila Chalupová	Czechoslovakia	5	Q
3	Jenny Addams	Belgium	4	Q
4	Erna Bogen-Bogáti	Hungary	4	Q
5	Ebba Gripenstedt	Sweden	2	
6	Irma Hopper	United States	1	
7	Else Ahlmann-Ohlsen	Denmark	0	

==== Pool D ====
Rank	Fencer	Nation	Wins	Notes
1	Olga Oelkers	Germany	4	Q
2	Lucie Prost	France	4	Q
3	Gladys Daniell	Great Britain	3	Q
4	Gizella Tary	Hungary	2	Q
5	Margot Bærentzen	Denmark	2	
6	Friederike Koderitsch	Netherlands	0	

=== Semifinals ===
Each pool was a round-robin. Bouts were to five touches. The top four fencers in each pool advanced to the final.

==== Semifinal A ====
Rank	Fencer	Nation	Wins	Notes
1	Helene Mayer	Germany	6	Q
2	Muriel Freeman	Great Britain	4	Q
3	Olga Oelkers	Germany	4	Q
4	Gladys Daniell	Great Britain	4	Q
5	Gizella Tary	Hungary	3	
6	Marion Lloyd	United States	3	
7	Lucie Prost	France	2	
8	Adriana Admiraal-Meijerink	Netherlands	2	

==== Semifinal B ====
Rank	Fencer	Nation	Wins	Notes
1	Jo de Boer	Netherlands	7	Q
2	Margit Danÿ	Hungary	5	Q
3	Erna Sondheim	Germany	4	Q
4	Jenny Addams	Belgium	4	Q
5	Jeanne Morgenthaler	Switzerland	3	
6	Peggy Butler	Great Britain	3	
7	Jarmila Chalupová	Czechoslovakia	1	
8	Erna Bogen-Bogáti	Hungary	1	

=== Final ===
The final was a round-robin. Bouts were to five touches.

Rank	Fencer	Nation	Wins
1st place, gold medalist(s)	Helene Mayer	Germany	7
2nd place, silver medalist(s)	Muriel Freeman	Great Britain	6
3rd place, bronze medalist(s)	Olga Oelkers	Germany	4
4	Erna Sondheim	Germany	3
5	Gladys Daniell	Great Britain	2
6	Jenny Addams	Belgium	2
6	Margit Danÿ	Hungary	2
8	Jo de Boer	Netherlands	2
