= British Fencing Championships =

- Frequency: annual
- Inaugurated: 1889
- Organiser: British Fencing
- Website: www.britishfencing.com

The British Fencing Championships are held annually to determine the British champion. The Championships are currently held at the English Institute of Sport, Sheffield or the Lee Valley Athletics Centre. These championships (known as the Nationals) are not to be confused with a new Championship introduced in 2023 called the British Open Championships, where any athlete can compete and are not restricted to British athletes.

The championships were not held during World War I, World War II and in 2020 due to the COVID-19 pandemic.

== Past winners ==
=== Men's foil ===
Year	Winner
1898	Holmes Turner
1899	Bulkley Praed
1900	Thomas Hobbins
1901	Harry Evan James
1902	John Jenkinson
1903	John Jenkinson
1904	John Jenkinson
1905	Robert Montgomerie
1906	Edgar Seligman
1907	Edgar Seligman
1908	Robert Montgomerie
1909	Robert Montgomerie
1910	Robert Montgomerie
1911	Edgar Amphlett
1912	Geoffrey Doyne
1913	Gordon Alexander
1914	Roland Willoughby
1915-19	No Competition
1920	Geoffrey Doyne
1921	Ralph Sutton
1922	Ralph Sutton
1923	Ernest Stenson-Cooke
1924	George Sherriff
1925	George Sherriff
1926	S R Bousfield
1927	Denis Pearce
1928	Emrys Lloyd
1929	Jack Evan James
1930	Emrys Lloyd
1931	Emrys Lloyd
1932	Emrys Lloyd
1933	Emrys Lloyd
1934	David Bartlett
1935	David Bartlett
1936	Christopher Hammersley
1937	Emrys Lloyd
1938	Emrys Lloyd
1939	Harry Cooke
1940-46	No Competition
1947	René Paul
1948	Arthur Smith
1949	René Paul

Year	Winner
1950	René Paul
1951	Harry Cooke
1952	Luke Wendon
1953	Raymond Paul
1954	John Fethers
1955	Raymond Paul
1956	René Paul
1957	Raymond Paul
1958	Raymond Paul
1959	Bill Hoskyns
1960	Derrick Cawthorne
1961	Sandy Leckie
1962	René Paul
1963	Allan Jay
1964	Bill Hoskyns
1965	Sandy Leckie
1966	Graham Paul
1967	Sandy Leckie
1968	Graham Paul
1969	Mike Breckin
1970	Bill Hoskyns
1971	Graham Paul
1972	Tony Power
1973	Graham Paul
1974	Barry Paul
1975	Barry Paul
1976	Barry Paul
1977	Nick Bell
1978	Pierre Harper
1979	Barry Paul
1980	Barry Paul
1981	Rob Bruniges
1982	Pierre Harper
1983	Pierre Harper
1984	Bill Gosbee
1985	Bill Gosbee
1986	Pierre Harper
1987	Pierre Harper
1988	Pierre Harper
1989	Donnie McKenzie
1990	Bill Gosbee
1991	Bill Gosbee

Year	Winner
1992	Bill Gosbee
1993	Laurent Harper
1994	Laurent Harper
1995	Paul Walsh
1996	Harry Lancaster
1997	Paul Walsh
1998	Sam Johnson
1999	James Beevers
2000	James Beevers
2001	Richard Kruse
2002	James Beevers
2003	David Mansoor
2004	James Beevers
2005	Jamie Kenber
2006	Richard Kruse
2007	Richard Kruse
2008	David Riseley
2009	Laurence Halsted
2010	Keith Cook
2011	Husayn Rosowsky
2012	Rhys Melia
2013	Alex Tofalides
2014	No Competition
2015	Richard Kruse
2016	Marcus Mepstead
2017	Richard Kruse
2018	Richard Kruse
2019	James-Andrew Davis
2020	No competition
2021	Kamal Minott
2022	Dominic De Almeida
2023	Jamie Cook
2024	Kamal Minott
2025	Jamie Cook
2026	Mohammed Belbouab

=== Men's épée ===
Year	Winner
1904	Edgar Seligman
1905	Robert Montgomerie
1906	Edgar Seligman
1907	Robert Montgomerie
1908	Leaf Daniell
1909	Robert Montgomerie
1910	Edgar Amphlett
1911	John Blake
1912	Robert Montgomerie
1913	Gordon Vereker
1914	Robert Montgomerie
1915-19	No Competition
1920	Martin Holt
1921	Herbert Huntington
1922	George Burt
1923	Martin Holt
1924	Charles Biscoe
1925	Barry Notley
1926	Ian Campbell-Gray
1927	Barry Notley
1928	Bertie Childs
1929	Luke Fildes
1930	Ian Campbell-Gray
1931	Bertie Childs
1932	Ian Campbell-Gray
1933	Bert Pelling
1934	Bert Pelling
1935	Ian Campbell-Gray
1936	Charles de Beaumont
1937	Charles de Beaumont
1938	Charles de Beaumont
1939	Terry Beddard
1940-46	No Competition
1947	Peter Dix
1948	Ron Parfitt
1949	Peter Dix
1950	Ron Parfitt
1951	Bert Pelling
1952	Allan Jay
1953	Charles de Beaumont

Year	Winner
1954	Peter Greenhalgh
1955	Ray Harrison
1956	Bill Hoskyns
1957	Bill Hoskyns
1958	Bill Hoskyns
1959	Allan Jay
1960	Allan Jay
1961	John Pelling
1962	Peter Jacobs
1963	John Glasswell
1964	Peter Jacobs
1965	John Pelling
1966	Teddy Bourne
1967	Bill Hoskyns
1968	Ralph Johnson
1969	Graham Paul
1970	Peter Jacobs
1971	Graham Paul
1972	Teddy Bourne
1973	Ted Hudson
1974	Teddy Bourne
1975	Tim Belson
1976	Teddy Bourne
1977	Teddy Bourne
1978	Teddy Bourne
1979	Tim Belson
1980	Steven Paul
1981	John Llewellyn
1982	Ralph Johnson
1983	Steven Paul
1984	Ralph Johnson
1985	Ralph Johnson
1986	Dominic Mahony
1987	Ralph Johnson
1988	John Llewellyn
1989	Hugh Kernohan
1990	Ralph Johnson
1991	John Llewellyn
1992	John Llewellyn
1993	Steven Paul

Year	Winner
1994	John Llewellyn
1995	Quentin Berriman
1996	Quentin Berriman
1997	Quentin Berriman
1998	Quentin Berriman
1999	Quentin Berriman
2000	Simon Austin
2001	Greg Allen
2002	Quentin Berriman
2003	Tristan Lane
2004	Tom Cadman
2005	Chris Howser
2006	Alastair Gerrard
2007	Jon Willis
2008	Jon Willis
2009	Tom Bennett
2010	Jon Willis
2011	Philip Marsh
2012	Dudley Tredger
2013	David Gregory
2014	No Competition
2015	Tom Edwards
2016	Calum Johnston
2017	Greg Allen
2018	Calum Johnston
2019	James Frewin
2020	No competition
2021	Calum Johnston
2022	Benjamin Andrews
2023	Calum Johnston
2024	Benjamin Andrews
2025	Tristan Lumineau
2026	Benjamin Andrews

=== Men's sabre ===
Year	Winner
1898	Walter Edgeworth-Johnstone
1899	Thomas Hobbins
1900	Walter Edgeworth-Johnstone
1901	Thomas Hobbins
1902	Thomas Hobbins
1903	Harry Evan-James
1904	Charles Wilson
1905	Charles Wilson
1906	Charles Wilson
1907	Ferdinand Fielmann
1908	William Marsh
1909	William Marsh
1910	Alfred Ridley-Martin
1911	Bill Hammond
1912	Charles Van Der Byl
1913	Alfred Ridley-Martin
1914	Bill Hammond
1915-19	No Competition
1920	Cecil Kershaw
1921	Bill Hammond
1922	Archie Corble
1923	Edgar Seligman
1924	Edgar Seligman
1925	Cecil Kershaw
1926	Cecil Kershaw
1927	Archie Corble
1928	Guy Harry
1929	Ronald Campbell
1930	Geoffrey Trinder
1931	Geoffrey Trinder
1932	Gordon Pilbrow
1933	Geoffrey Trinder
1934	Geoffrey Trinder
1935	Gordon Pilbrow
1936	Robin Brook
1937	Roger Tredgold
1938	Gordon Pilbrow
1939	Roger Tredgold
1940-46	No Competition
1947	Roger Tredgold
1948	Roger Tredgold

Year	Winner
1949	Roger Tredgold
1950	Gordon Pilbrow
1951	Pierre Turquet
1952	Richard Porebski
1953	Richard Porebski
1954	Ralph Cooperman
1955	Roger Tredgold
1956	Richard Porebski
1957	Mike Amberg
1958	Mike Amberg
1959	Mike Amberg
1960	Ralph Cooperman
1961	Ralph Cooperman
1962	Clive Fisher
1963	Sandy Leckie
1964	Sandy Leckie
1965	Sandy Leckie
1966	Bill Hoskyns
1967	Sandy Leckie
1968	Sandy Leckie
1969	David Acfield
1970	David Acfield
1971	David Acfield
1972	David Acfield
1973	Peter Mather
1974	Richard Cohen
1975	John Deanfield
1976	Jim Philbin
1977	Jim Philbin
1978	Jim Philbin
1979	Mark Slade
1980	Richard Cohen
1981	Jim Philbin
1982	Richard Cohen
1983	Jim Philbin
1984	Paul Klenerman
1985	Mark Slade
1986	Richard Cohen
1987	Richard Cohen
1988	Mark Slade
1989	Ian Williams

Year	Winner
1990	Gary Fletcher
1991	Ian Williams
1992	Ian Williams
1993	Amin Zahir
1994	Nick Fletcher
1995	Amin Zahir
1996	James Williams
1997	Nick Fletcher
1998	Ian Williams
1999	Robin Knight
2000	James Williams
2001	Chris Jamieson
2002	David Sach
2003	Mike Johnson
2004	Chris Farren
2005	Alex O'Connell
2006	Alex O'Connell
2007	Chris Buxton
2008	Chris Buxton
2009	Chris Buxton
2010	Alex O'Connell
2011	Alex Crutchett
2012	James Honeybone
2013	James Honeybone
2014	No Competition
2015	James Honeybone
2016	Jonathan Webb
2017	James Honeybone
2018	James Honeybone
2019	William Deary
2020	No competition
2021	William Deary
2022	William Deary
2023	William Deary
2024	Curtis Miller
2025	Samuel Allen
2026	William Deary

=== Women's foil ===
Year	Winner
1907	Millicent Hall
1908	Millicent Hall
1909	Cecilia Elizabeth Martin-Edmunds
1910	Julia Johnstone
1911	Gladys Daniell
1912	Gladys Daniell
1913	Alice Walker
1914	Alice Walker
1915-19	No Competition
1920	Charlotte Agnes Walker
1921	Gladys Daniell
1922	Millicent Hall
1923	Gladys Davis
1924	Gladys Daniell
1925	Gladys Davis
1926	Gladys Davis
1927	Muriel Freeman
1928	Peggy Butler
1929	Muriel Freeman
1930	Peggy Butler
1931	Peggy Butler
1932	Peggy Butler
1933	Judy Guinness
1934	Gwendoline Neligan
1935	Gwendoline Neligan
1936	Gwendoline Neligan
1937	Gwendoline Neligan
1938	Judy Penn-Hughes
1939	Betty Arbuthnott
1940-46	No Competition
1947	Betty Arbuthnott
1948	Mary Glen-Haig
1949	Gillian Sheen
1950	Mary Glen-Haig
1951	Gillian Sheen
1952	Gillian Sheen

Year	Winner
1953	Gillian Sheen
1954	Gillian Sheen
1955	Gillian Sheen
1956	Gillian Sheen
1957	Gillian Sheen
1958	Gillian Sheen
1959	Margaret Stafford
1960	Gillian Sheen
1961	Theresa Offredy
1962	Theresa Offredy
1963	Mary Ann Pritchard
1964	Shirley Netherway
1965	Janet Bewley-Cathie
1966	Shirley Parker
1967	Janet Wardell-Yerburgh
1968	Sue Green
1969	Janet Wardell-Yerburgh
1970	Janet Wardell-Yerburgh
1971	Janet Wardell-Yerburgh
1972	Janet Wardell-Yerburgh
1973	Clare Halsted
1974	Wendy Ager
1975	Sue Wrigglesworth
1976	Linda Ann Martin
1977	Hilary Cawthorne
1978	Liz Wood
1979	Liz Wood
1980	Wendy Grant
1981	Liz Thurley
1982	Linda Ann Martin
1983	Liz Thurley
1984	Linda Ann Martin
1985	Linda Ann Martin
1986	Liz Thurley
1987	Liz Thurley
1988	Linda Ann Martin
1989	Fiona McIntosh

Year	Winner
1990	Linda Strachan
1991	Fiona McIntosh
1992	Lucy Harris
1993	Fiona McIntosh
1994	Fiona McIntosh
1995	Linda Strachan
1996	Lucy Harris
1997	Linda Strachan
1998	Linda Strachan
1999	Linda Strachan
2000	Linda Strachan
2001	Linda Strachan
2002	Camille Datoo
2003	Dominique Stowell
2004	Camille Datoo
2005	Camille Datoo
2006	Dominique Stowell
2007	Anna Bentley
2008	Anna Bentley
2009	Anna Bentley
2010	Natalia Sheppard
2011	Martina Emanuel
2012	Elizabeth Ng
2013	Dominique Szokolovics
2014	No Competition
2015	Ayesha Fihosy
2016	Hannah Bryars
2017	Kate Beardmore
2018	Chloe Dixon
2019	Teagan Williams-Stewart
2020	No competition
2021	Carolina Stuchbury
2022	Kate Beardmore
2023	Amelie Tsang
2024	Amelie Tsang
2025	Amelie Tsang
2026	Amelie Tsang

=== Women's épée ===
Year	Winner
1986	Alda Milner-Barry
1987	Maureen Lloyd
1988	Kate Smith
1989	Penny Tomlinson
1990	Nicky Twigg
1991	Georgina Usher
1992	Georgina Usher
1993	Nicola Cain
1994	Carol Greenway
1995	Kate Houston
1996	Sheila Pearce
1997	Georgina Usher
1998	Georgina Usher
1999	Val Cramb

Year	Winner
2000	Georgina Usher
2001	Georgina Usher
2002	Georgina Usher
2003	Georgina Usher
2004	Jo Beadsworth
2005	Kate Allenby
2006	Georgina Usher
2007	Mary Cohen
2008	Hannah Lawrence
2009	Corinna Lawrence
2010	Elisa Albini
2011	Mary Cohen
2012	Georgina Usher
2013	Corinna Lawrence

Year	Winner
2014	No Competition
2015	Hannah Lawrence
2016	Hannah Lawrence
2017	Hannah Lawrence
2018	Mary Cohen
2019	Susan Maria Sica
2020	No competition
2021	Alexandra Powell
2022	Susan Maria Sica
2023	Julia Caron
2024	Susan Maria Sica
2025	Susan Maria Sica
2026	Susan Maria Sica

=== Women's sabre ===
Year	Winner
1989	Sally Claxton
1990	Sue Benney
1991	Sheelagh Baines
1992	Sue Benney
1993	Sue Benney
1994	Sue Benney
1995	Sue Benney
1996	Sue Benney
1997	Louise Bond-Williams
1998	Caroline Stevenson
1999	Louise Bond-Williams
2000	Louise Bond-Williams
2001	Louise Bond-Williams
2002	Louise Bond-Williams

Year	Winner
2003	Louise Bond-Williams
2004	Louise Bond-Williams
2005	Chrystall Nicoll
2006	Louise Bond-Williams
2007	Jo Hutchison
2008	Chrystall Nicoll
2009	Louise Bond-Williams
2010	Chrystall Nicoll
2011	Louise Bond-Williams
2012	Kira Roberts
2013	Sophie Williams
2014	No Competition

Year	Winner
2015	Jo Hutchison
2016	Caitlin Maxwell
2017	Caitlin Maxwell
2018	Caitlin Maxwell
2019	Caitlin Maxwell
2020	No competition
2021	Caitlin Maxwell
2022	Caitlin Maxwell
2023	Maria Chart
2024	Maria Chart
2025	Caitlin Maxwell
2026	Kate Daykin
