= Alice Walker (fencer) =

British fencer (1876–1954)

Personal information
- Full name: Alice Barringer Walker
- Born: 10 April 1876 Brixton, London
- Died: 10 March 1954 (aged 77) Royal Tunbridge Wells, Kent

Sport
- Country: Great Britain
- Sport: Fencing

Alice Barringer Walker (10 April 1876 – 10 March 1954) was a British fencer. She was a two-time British champion, and competed in the 1924 Summer Olympics. Walker was also the vice-president of the Ladies' Amateur Fencing Association.

== Fencing ==
Walker was the British champion in women's foil in 1913 and 1914. She was a winner of the Alfred Hutton Challenge Cup in the Ladies International Fencing Competition final, held at Bertand's School of Arms.

She competed in the women's individual foil at the 1924 Summer Olympics, alongside fellow British fencers Gladys Davis, Gladys Daniell, and Muriel Freeman, as one of 28 women on the British Olympic team and 26 women fencers from all countries at that Olympics. In Olympic pool play, she beat Suzanne Bonnard (Switzerland), but lost to Adelaide Gehrig (US), Grete Heckscher (Denmark), Gizella Tary (Hungary), and Fernande Tassy (France), and did not advance out of her pool.

In 1930, when the Ladies' Amateur Fencing Association held its first meeting, she was elected as its vice-president. Millicent Spong (formerly Millicent Hathaway Hall), the 1908 British champion and one of the first women to fence at an Olympics, though not in a medal sport, was president.

== Personal life ==
Walker was born in Brixton, London, the daughter of John Walker, a well known stationer in the city specialising in diaries. Her sister, Charlotte Agnes, was also an accomplished fencer who won the 1920 British title. During World War I, the sisters worked as cooks with the French Red Cross.
