= Ellen Osiier =

Danish fencer (1890–1962)

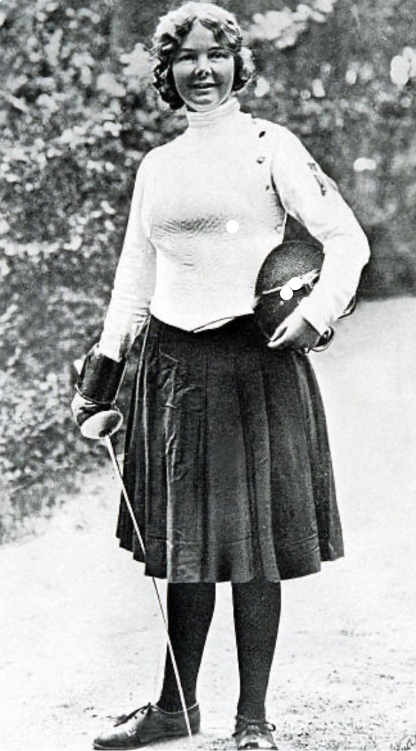
- Ellen Osiier at the 1924 Summer Olympics

Personal information
- Full name: Ellen Ottilia Osiier-Thomsen
- Nationality: Danish
- Born: Ellen Ottilia Thomsen; 13 August 1890 Hjørring, Nordjylland, Denmark
- Died: 6 September 1962 (aged 72) København, Denmark
- Occupation: Fencing
- Height: 168 cm (5 ft 6 in)
- Spouse: Ivan Joseph Martin Osiier
Medal record
Representing Denmark
Fencing
Gold medal – first place	1924 Summer Olympics	Individual foil

Ellen Osiier (13 August 1890 – 6 September 1962) was a Danish foil fencer and the first woman to be awarded a gold medal in fencing at the Olympic Games. As of 2026, she remains the only Dane to win a gold medal in fencing at the Olympics.

== Fencing career ==
Osiier studied with Leonce Mahaut, a French fencing instructor who was in high demand in Denmark at the time. He frequently held fencing socials at his "Salle d'Armes Mahaut" which were widely discussed in the papers of Copenhagen. In 1917, she joined the women's fencing club in Copenhagen, Damernes Fægte-Klub.

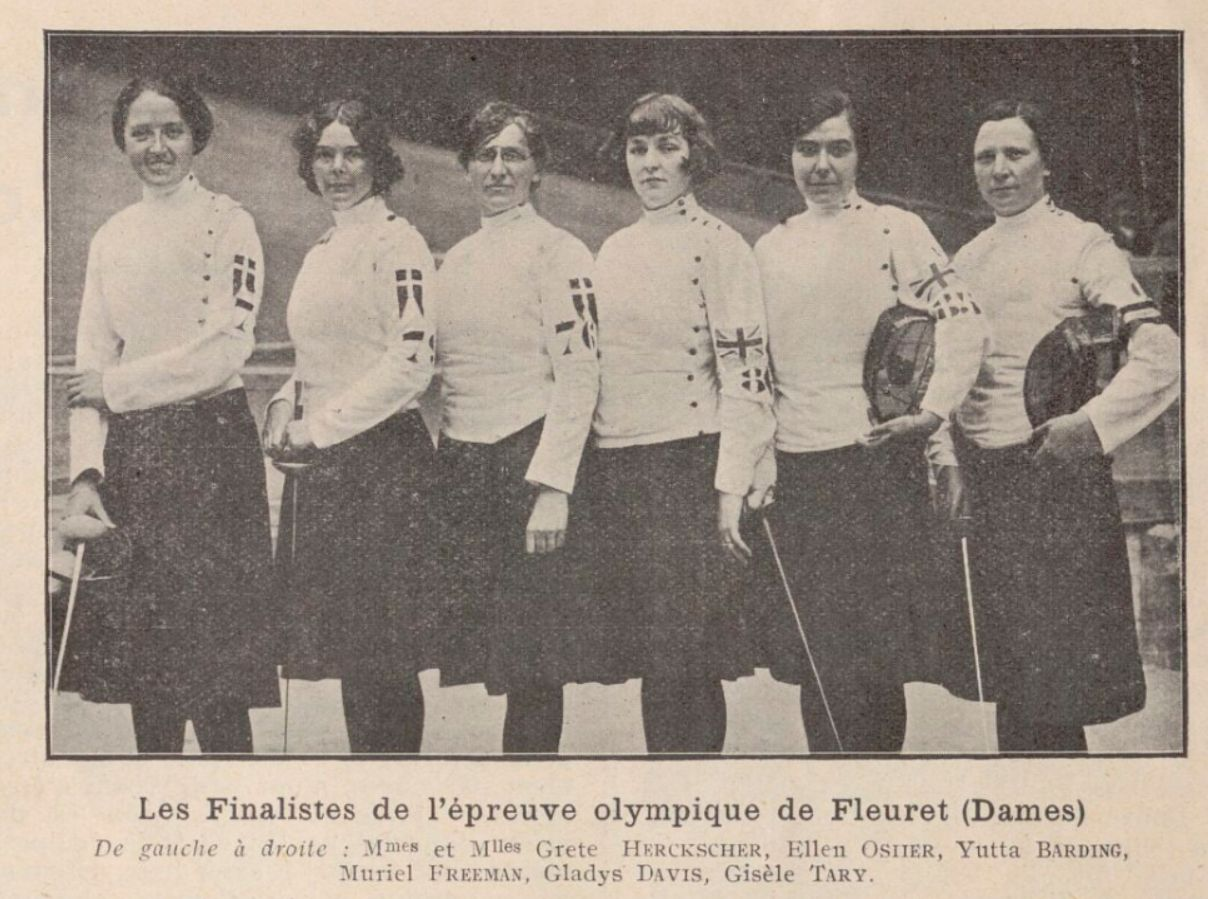
The finalists of the women's foil competition at the 1924 Summer Olympics (from left to right): Grete Hercksher, Ellen Osiier, Yutta Barding, Muriel Freeman, Gladys Davis, and Gisèle Tary.

The 1924 Summer Olympics in Paris were the first Olympic Games to include women's fencing. Osiier, then 33, went undefeated in the 16 matches she fenced in the event. She defeated Gladys Davis in the final to win the gold medal. With this victory, Osiier became the Olympics' first woman fencing champion.

As there were no official international fencing championships for women at the time, Osiier's career was relatively short and there is very little evidence that Osiier competitively fenced following the 1924 Olympics. In 1932, she had been asked to judge for the Summer Olympics, but claims of favoritism by a former teammate led her to be removed from the roster very shortly beforehand. She subsequently won a defamation lawsuit related to those claims.

== Personal life ==
Ellen Ottilia Thomsen was born on 13 August 1890 in Hjørring, Denmark. Her mother was Ane Kristine Jensen (1845–1902) and her father, Jens Christian Thomsen (1842–1918), was a master bricklayer and fire inspector.

On 2 May 1919, she married Jewish physician Ivan Joseph Martin Osiier, who was also a fencer. The couple had been engaged for five years, but were forced to delay their wedding due to World War I. He had competed for Denmark at the 1912 Olympics where he won a silver medal in individual épée. Ivan went on to compete in 7 olympic games and win 25 Danish national championships in three weapons.

In 1943, she and her husband fled to Stockholm when Denmark came under direct military control of Nazi Germany. They returned to Copenhagen after the end of World War II. Ellen Osiier died on 8 September 1962 in Copenhagen. She and her husband were buried at Bispebjerg Cemetery.

== See also ==
- Fencing at the 1924 Summer Olympics
- List of select Jewish fencers
- List of Jewish Olympic medalists
