= Ole Poulsen =

Danish sailor

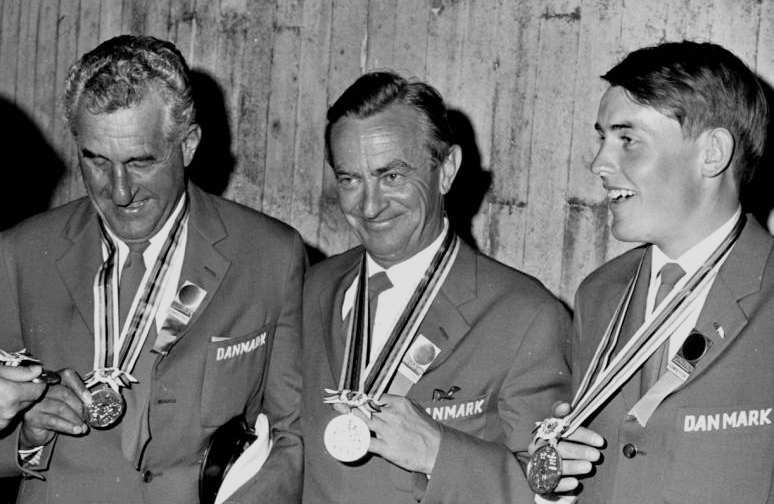
- Berntsen, Von Bülow & Poulsen – 1964 Olympics

Personal information
- Nationality: Danish
- Born: 16 December 1941 (age 84) Maglegård, Denmark
- Height: 176 cm (5 ft 9 in)
- Weight: 75 kg (165 lb)

Sailing career
- Sport: Sailing
- Club: Royal Danish Yacht Club
- Class: Dragon
Medal record
Sailing
Representing Denmark
Olympic Games
Gold medal – first place	1964 Tokyo	Dragon
Dragon World Championship
Gold medal – first place	1965 Sandhamn	Dragon

Ole Poulsen (born 16 December 1941) is a Danish retired sailor. Competing in the dragon class he won gold medals at the 1964 Olympics and 1965 World Championships, both times with Ole Berntsen. His mother Ulla Barding-Poulsen and grandmother Yutta Barding were Olympic fencers.

He represented Hellerup Sejlklub.

His grandmother, Yutta Barding, and his mother Ulla Barding-Poulsen were also olympic athletes in 1936 and 1952 respectively.
