= Treadgold =

Treadgold is a surname. Notable people with the surname include:

- John Treadgold (1931–2015), British Anglican priest
- Mary Treadgold (1910–2005), British author, literary editor, and television producer
- Warren Treadgold (born 1949), American historian

== See also ==
- Tredgold
