= Tavčar =

Tavčar is a Slovene surname. Notable people with the surname include:

- Anže Tavčar (born 1994), Slovene swimmer
- Ivan Tavčar (1851–1923), Slovene writer and politician
- Ivka Tavčar (1909–unknown), Slovene fencer
- Rajko Tavčar (born 1974), Slovene footballer
- Stanko Tavčar (1898–1945), Slovene footballer
- Zora Tavčar (born 1928), Slovene writer
