= Thurley =

Thurley is an English surname. Notable people with the surname include:

- Cameron Thurley (born 1981), Australian rules footballer
- John Thurley (born 1947), British swimmer
- Liz Thurley (born 1959), British fencer
- Simon Thurley (born 1962), British academic and architectural historian
