= Tredger =

Tredger is a surname. Notable people with this surname include:

- Dudley Tredger (born 1984), British fencer
- Jim Tredger, Canadian politician
- Lane Tredger, Canadian politician
