= Neligan =

Neligan is a surname. Notable people with the surname include:

- David Neligan (1899–1983), "The Spy in the Castle"
- David M Neligan (1935–2025), Irish diplomat
- Dorinda Neligan (1833–1914), Irish-born English headmistress and suffragette
- Gwendoline Neligan (1905–1972), British fencer
- Moore Richard Neligan (1863–1922), Anglican Bishop
- Maurice Neligan (1937–2010), Irish heart surgeon, activist, newspaper columnist and media commentator
- Maurice Wilder-Neligan (1886–1923), born Maurice Neligan, British-born Australian soldier

== Fictional characters ==
- John Hopley Neligan, a character in The Adventure of Black Peter, a Sherlock Holmes story by Sir Arthur Conan Doyle
