= Alex O'Connell =

Alex O'Connell may refer to:

- Alex O'Connell (fencer) (born 1988), British Olympic fencer
- Alex O'Connell (character), a character in The Mummy film series
- Alex O'Connell (basketball) (born 1999), American basketball player
