= Sir Ian =

Sir Ian may refer to:

- Sir Ian Anstruther, writer
- Sir Ian Blair, Head of the Metropolitan Police Service
- Sir Ian Botham, cricketer
- Sir Ian Campbell-Gray, soldier
- Sir Ian Hamilton, general
- Sir Ian Holm, actor
- Sir Ian Kennedy, lawyer
- Sir Ian Kershaw, historian
- Sir Ian Lloyd, politician
- Sir Ian McKellen, actor
- Sir Ian McLennan, businessman
- Sir Ian Malcolm, politician
- Sir Ian Potter, businessman
- Sir Ian Wrigglesworth, politician
