= Hellqvist =

Hellqvist is a Swedish surname. Notable people with the surname include:

- Carl Gustaf Hellqvist (1851–1890), Swedish painter
- Sofia Hellqvist (now Princess Sofia, Duchess of Värmland; born 1984), Swedish model and wife of Prince Carl Philip, Duke of Värmland

== See also ==
- Hellquist
