= Tredgold =

Tredgold is a surname, and may refer to:

- A. F. Tredgold (1870–1952), British mental health expert and author
- John Harfield Tredgold (1798–1842), English chemist
- Nye Tredgold, pseudonym of Nigel Tranter
- Robert Clarkson Tredgold (1899–1977), British barrister and judge
- Roger Tredgold (1911–1975), British Olympic fencer
- Thomas Tredgold (1788–1829), English engineer and author
