= Derrick Cawthorne =

British fencer (1931–2024)

Personal information
- Born: 24 April 1931 St Pancras, London, England
- Died: 30 December 2024 (aged 93)

Sport
- Sport: Fencing

Derrick Cawthorne (24 April 1931 – 30 December 2024) was a British fencer. He competed in the team foil event at the 1964 Summer Olympics. In 1960, he won the foil title at the British Fencing Championships.

Cawthorne died on 30 December 2024, aged 93. His daughter is Hilary Cawthorne. He also had 4 grandchildren: Susie, Zoe, Christopher and Phoebe.
