= Hellquist =

Hellquist is a Swedish surname. Notable people with the surname include:

- Adolf Hellquist, Swedish diver
- Carl Gustaf Hellquist (1893–1973), Swedish jurist
- Elof Hellquist (1864–1933), Swedish scientist
- Elsa Hellquist (1886–1983), Swedish fencer
- Gens Hellquist (1946–2013), Canadian activist and publisher
- Hanna Hellquist (born 1980), Swedish journalist, television host and writer
- Ole Hellequist, guitarist and singer in Lowrider (Swedish band)
- Philip Hellquist (born 1991), Swedish footballer
- Solveig Hellquist (born 1949), Swedish politician
