= William Deary =

British fencer (born 1997)

Personal information
- Nationality: British (English)
- Born: 27 June 1997 (age 29) Cheltenham, England
- Website: http://willdeary.co.uk

Fencing career
- Sport: Fencing
- Weapon: Sabre
- Hand: right-handed
- Club: Truro Fencing Club
- Head coach: Jon Salfield
- FIE ranking: 30th Senior in World (Jan 2023)
Medal record
Men's Sabre
Representing Great Britain
European Games
Bronze medal – third place	2023 Kraków–Małopolska	Individual sabre
Representing England
British Championships
Gold medal – first place	2019	sabre
Gold medal – first place	2021	sabre
Gold medal – first place	2022	sabre
Gold medal – first place	2023	sabre
Gold medal – first place	2026	sabre

William Deary (born 27 June 1997) is an English sabre fencer who is a five-time British champion.

== Biography ==
He began fencing at the age of 10, at Truro School. In 2015, he moved to London which enabled him to join British Fencing's World Class Programme.

He won the British sabre national title at the British Fencing Championships in 2019, 2021 and 2022. In 2023, he won his fourth consecutive British Sabre title.

In 2023 Deary won Great Britain's first ever medal in the sabre at the European Games after claiming a bronze. Deary won a fifth British title in 2026.
