= Jon Willis =

Personal information
- Nationality: British (English)
- Born: Q1, 1981 Walsall, England

Sport
- Sport: Professional fencing

Jonathan Robert James Willis is an épée fencer. In 2007, he became the first British fencer since 1981, to win an event during the 2006–07 Fencing World Cup. He is also a three times British champion.

== Biography ==
=== Fencing career ===
Willis began fencing at Hazel Grove High School after meeting Bob Merry, a fencing coach who encouraged him to take up the sport. His father, a postman, was also keen on sport. Willis joined an after-school club, where he won a team foil competition. Following this he took part in three Under-15s competitions: he won two and came second in the other. At this point Willis still considered fencing to be "a bit of fun", although he continued it because of his height. He decided that épée was the weapon best suited to him and entered a North-West Under-16s event, which he won. The first senior competition Willis took part in was the Merseyside Open, in which he reached the quarter-finals.

After this Willis approached Stockport Sword Club's head coach, Professor Andrew Vincent. Andy offered to coach Willis for free because Willis could not afford it. Willis has been training with Vincent for 13 years. During this time he has gone through a variety of jobs, got a degree in mechanical engineering and obtained accountancy qualifications. He has won two Commonwealth Fencing Championship medals: a silver medal in 2002 and a bronze medal in 2006.

In March 2007, under the coaching of Vincent, Willis took part in a World Cup event in Germany, where he won gold, becoming the first British fencer to win a World Cup event since 1981. Also in 2007 Willis won the first of his three epee titles at the British Fencing Championships. In 2007, Willis worked for and was sponsored by B&Q. Their backing allowed Willis to train almost full-time and to travel over-seas for competitions. He was contracted to work 12 hours a week but was given time-off for sporting events.

In 2008, he won his second British epee title before the British Olympic Pathway Programme dropped Willis from funding for 12 months in April 2009. However, he continued to compete on the World Cup circuit through self funding and was put back on funding and won his second World Cup in Kish Island in Iran during January 2010. In 2010, he won his third and final epee title at the British Fencing Championships. In March 2010, Jon left his home town club of Stockport and moved to live and train in Heidenheim, Germany.

He retired from international fencing after failing to be selected for Team GB and a failed appeal during 2012.

== Post-retirement ==
Willis lived in London and became the club director of the Salle Paul Fencing Club. He continues to run competitions all over the country and continues coaching.
