= Christopher Hammersley =

British fencer (1903–1994)

Personal information
- Born: 4 January 1903 Chelsea, London, England
- Died: January 1994 (aged 90–91)

Sport
- Sport: Fencing

Christopher Ralph Hammersley (4 January 1903 – January 1994) was a British fencer. He competed in the team foil event at the 1936 Summer Olympics. In 1936, he won the foil title at the British Fencing Championships.
