= James Honeybone =

British fencer (born 1991)

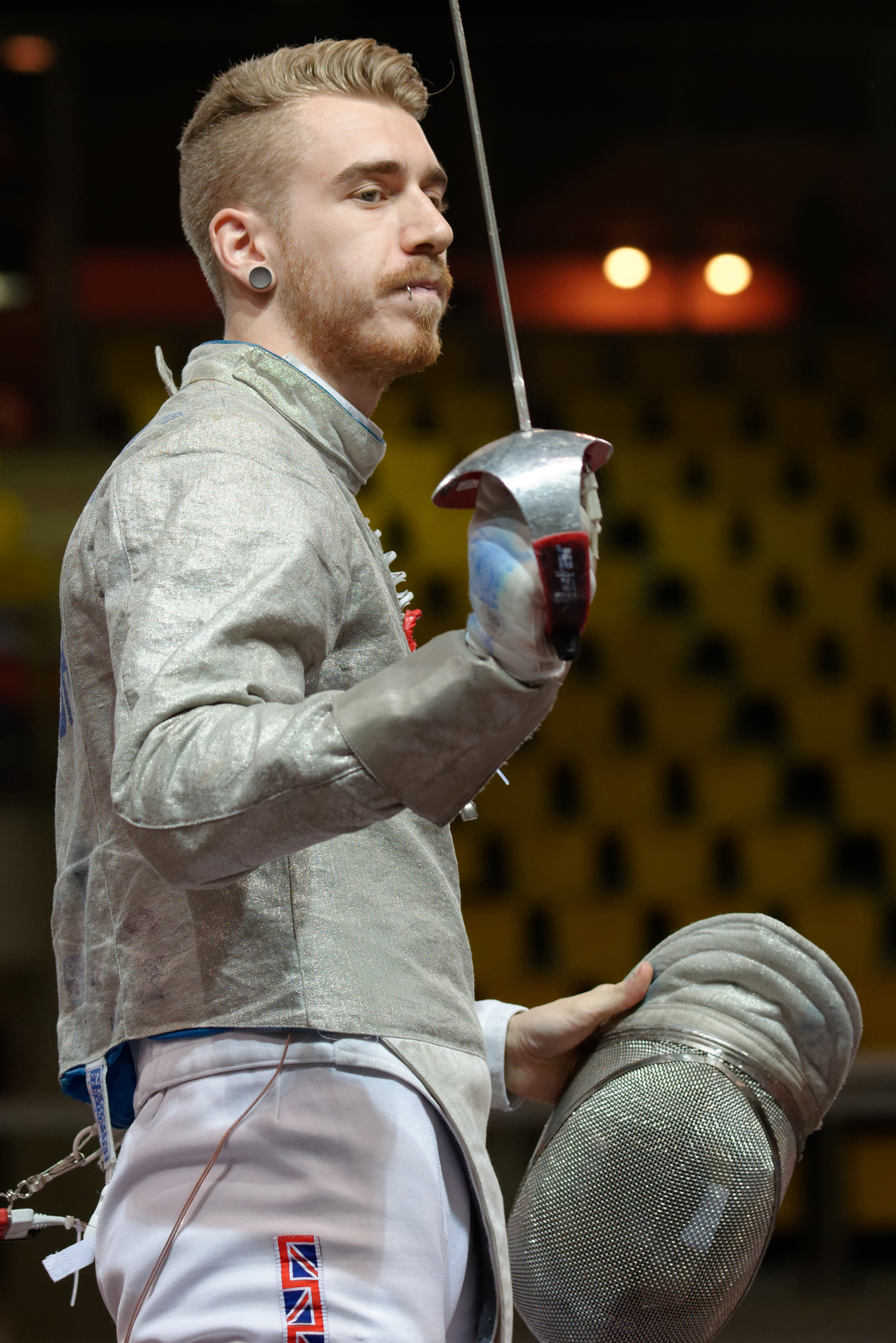
- Honeybone at the 2014 European Fencing Championships

Personal information
- Nationality: British (English)
- Born: 11 January 1991 (age 35) Truro, Cornwall
- Height: 1.92 m (6 ft 3 1/2 in)
- Weight: 81 kg (179 lb; 12.8 st)

Fencing career
- Sport: Fencing
- Weapon: Sabre
- Hand: right-handed
- Club: Truro Fencing Club
- Head coach: Jon Salfield
- FIE ranking: current ranking
Medal record
Men's Sabre
Representing England
British Championships
Gold medal – first place	2012	sabre
Gold medal – first place	2013	sabre
Gold medal – first place	2015	sabre
Gold medal – first place	2017	sabre
Gold medal – first place	2018	sabre

James Honeybone (born 11 January 1991) is a five times British champion fencer. At the 2012 Summer Olympics, he competed in the Men's sabre, but was defeated in the first round.

He began fencing at the age of 9, and trained in Hungary for two years.

He won the British sabre national title at the British Fencing Championships in 2012, 2013, 2015, 2017 and 2018.
