= Jim Philbin =

British fencer (born 1950)

Personal information
- Born: 22 July 1950 (age 75) Manchester, England

Sport
- Sport: Fencing

James Philbin (born 22 July 1950) is a British fencer. He competed in the team sabre event at the 1984 Summer Olympics.

== Fencing career ==
Philbin was a five times British fencing champion, winning the sabre title at the British Fencing Championships in 1976, 1977, 1978, 1981 and 1983. In 1984, he was selected to represent Great Britain at the 1984 Summer Olympics in Los Angeles. He participated in the men's team sabre event. He was a member of the British team from 1973 until 1984, winning his first major Home International event in 1977.

== Personal life ==
In 1985 he married fellow fencing Champion Hilary Cawthorne.
