= James Beevers =

British fencer (born 1979)

Personal information
- Full name: James Alexander Beevers
- Born: 31 January 1979 (age 47) Southend-on-Sea, England

Sport
- Sport: Fencing

James Alexander Beevers (born 31 January 1979) is a British fencer. He competed in the individual foil event at the 2000 Summer Olympics. He was a four times British fencing champion, winning four foil titles at the British Fencing Championships, from 1999 to 2004.
