= Charles Wilson (fencer) =

British fencer

Personal information
- Born: 3 September 1864 Leeds, England
- Died: 22 January 1950 (aged 85) Windermere, Cumbria, England

Sport
- Sport: Fencing
- Club: Leeds Fencing Club

Charles Albert Wilson (3 September 1864 – 22 January 1950) was a British fencer. He competed in the individual and team sabre events at the 1908 Summer Olympics. He was a three times British fencing champion, winning the sabre title at the British Fencing Championships in 1904, 1905 and 1906.
