= Bill Hammond (fencer) =

British fencer (1872–1935)

Personal information
- Born: 30 January 1872 Purley, London, England
- Died: 24 March 1935 (aged 63) Worthing, West Sussex, England

Sport
- Sport: Fencing

William Hammond (30 January 1872 – 24 March 1935) was a British fencer. He competed at two Olympic Games. He was a three times British fencing champion, winning the sabre title at the British Fencing Championships in 1911, 1914 and 1921.
