= Calum Johnston =

British fencer

Personal information
- Nationality: British (Scottish)
- Born: 13 January 1992 (age 34) Newcastle-upon-Tyne, England

Fencing career
- Sport: Fencing
- Weapon: Épée
- Head coach: Bert Bracewell / Andrew Alderman
Medal record
Men's Épée
Representing Scotland
British Championships
Gold medal – first place	2016	épée
Gold medal – first place	2018	épée
Gold medal – first place	2021	épée
Gold medal – first place	2023	épée
Silver medal – second place	2025	épée
Commonwealth Championships
Silver medal – second place	2018	épée individual
Bronze medal – third place	2018	épée team
Silver medal – second place	2022	épée team

Calum Johnston (born 13 January 1992) is a Scottish épée fencer.

== Career ==
Johnston started fencing aged 11 at the Linlithgow Academy school club.

Johnston captained the Edinburgh University team while at University and helped them become British BUCS league champions. He has won the British épée national title at the British Fencing Championships on four occasions in 2016, 2018, 2021 and 2023. He also came second at the 2025 British Fencing Championships. When he won the title in 2016, he became the first Scotsman for 27 years to win the épée title.

Johnston has also won three medals at the Commonwealth fencing championships. At the 2018 championships in Canberra, Australia, he won silver in the individual championships, losing by a single point in the final, and won bronze in the team championships. At the 2022 championships in London, England, he won silver in the team championships, making him the most successful Scottish male épéeist at the Commonwealth championships.
