= Ruth Gilligan =

Irish writer, journalist and university lecturer

- Born: 1 February 1988 (age 38); Dublin, Ireland
- Occupations: Novelist, actress
- Writing career
- Period: 2006–present
- Genres: Literary fiction; historical fiction
- Notable works: Nine Folds Make a Paper Swan, played Laura Halpin in Fair City

Ruth Gilligan (born 12 March 1988) is an Irish writer, journalist and university lecturer, born in Dublin.

== Early life ==
Gilligan's father was an accountant and her mother a speech therapist. Her brother David is ten years her senior, and the family hail from Blackrock, where she grew up.

== Career and studies ==
Gilligan studied acting at the Betty Ann Norton Theatre School in Dublin from the age of six, and later secured theatre, TV commercial and short film roles. Her first professional role was at the Gaiety Theatre in Dublin, at the age of 11.

At second level, Gilligan attended St. Andrew's College, Booterstown, and while there, from age 12 to age 16, she played Laura Halpin in the Irish soap opera Fair City, and wrote her first novel, Forget, as a Transition Year secondary school project. After reading and editing by successful novelist Patricia Scanlan, and extensive rewriting, the novel was published in 2006 in the UK and Ireland, reaching number one on the Irish Bestsellers' List, making her the youngest person in Ireland ever to have done so.

Achieving eight Higher-Level A1 grades in her Leaving Certificate examinations, Gilligan continued her studies at Cambridge University achieving a double First Class Honours degree in English literature from Gonville and Caius College. While in second year there she published her second novel, Somewhere in Between, which was also translated into German.

In January 2009, Gilligan was announced as the youngest ever recipient of an O'Reilly Foundation Scholarship to pursue advanced studies in English literature. Her third book was launched in Blackrock, County Dublin in August 2009, following which she discussed her work, scholarship and GB Olympic fencing boyfriend Alex O'Connell, to whom the book is dedicated, in a live TV interview.

From 2009-2010 she attended Yale University, earning an MA in English literature. From 2010-2011 she was enrolled on the Creative Writing MA at the University of East Anglia. In 2014 she earned her PhD in English from the University of Exeter.

Having set aside a new novel, her fourth published book, Nine Folds Make a Paper Swan, is based around the history of Irish Jews, and was published by Atlantic Books in July 2016 (UK / Ireland). It received very favourable reviews, including numerous comparisons to James Joyce and Colum McCann. In 2017, it was published in the US by Tin House, and in Israel by Penn Israel.

The Butchers (also published under the title The Butchers' Blessing), was published in 2020. Set in the 1990s, it tells of a group of men, known as The Butchers, who travel around Ireland to farmers who follow the "old ways", slaughtering cattle according to a traditional ritual which stems from an ancient curse; the BSE outbreak in Ireland forms a background. Gilligan has said that readers are often shocked or hurt to find out that both the ritual and the curse are made up. The Butchers won the 2021 Royal Society of Literature Ondaatje Prize.

Gilligan took up a post as a lecturer at the University of Birmingham, and in 2021 was made their first ever Professor of Creative Writing.

She reviews books for the Times Literary Supplement, Guardian, LA Review of Books and Irish Independent, where she was a columnist for a number of years.

Gilligan also works with Colum McCann's storytelling charity Narrative 4 - an international organisation devoted to fostering radical empathy amongst diverse teens - for whom she has organised a number of projects.

== Books ==
- Forget (Number 1 bestseller) (2006)
- Somewhere in Between (2007)
- Can You See Me? (2009)
- Nine Folds Make a Paper Swan (2017)
- The Butchers (also published as The Butchers' Blessing) (winner of the RSL Ondaatje Prize 2021) (2020)

== Personal life ==
Gilligan is married to lawyer and former Olympic fencer on the Great Britain team, Alex O'Connell. They met in 2008, became engaged in 2016, and married in County Wicklow in 2017. They now live in Highbury, London.

== Sources ==
- "Tubridy Tonight: Ruth Gilligan (television interview)". RTÉ. 23 September 2006.
