= Susan Maria Sica =

British épée fencer

Personal information
- Born: January 22, 1998 (age 28)

Fencing career
- Sport: Fencing
- Country: Great Britain
- Weapon: Épée
- Hand: left-handed
- Club: S.S. Lazio Scherma Ariccia
- FIE ranking: current ranking
Medal record
National Championships
Gold medal – first place	2019	épée
Gold medal – first place	2022	épée
Gold medal – first place	2024	épée
Gold medal – first place	2025	épée
Gold medal – first place	2026	épée
Commonwealth Championships
Gold medal – first place	2022	Individual
Bronze medal – third place	2022	Team
European Olympic Qualification Tournament
Bronze medal – third place	2021 Madrid	Individual
European U23 Circuit
Bronze medal – third place	2018 Busto Arsizio	Individual
Bronze medal – third place	2019 Busto Arsizio	Individual

Susan Maria Sica (born 22 January 1998) is an Italian-born épée fencer, competing for Great Britain and five-times British national champion.

== Biography ==
Sica's club was S.S. Lazio Scherma Ariccia.

In her first season competing for Great Britain, Sica finished 24th in the World Championships in Budapest, Hungary, losing to Violetta Kolobova. In addition, Sica has competed for Great Britain at numerous World Cups, Satellites and European Circuit events.

In 2026 Sica won her fifth title at the British Fencing Championships after winning previous titles in 2019, 2022, 2024 and 2025.
