= Amin Zahir =

British fencer

Personal information
- Nationality: British
- Born: 17 September 1970 (age 56) Chelmsford, Essex, England

Sport
- Sport: Fencing

Amin Zahir (born 17 September 1970) is a British fencer. He was educated at Highgate School. He competed in the team sabre event at the 1992 Summer Olympics. In 1993 and 1995, he won the sabre title at the British Fencing Championships.
