= Raymond Paul =

British fencer (1928–2013)

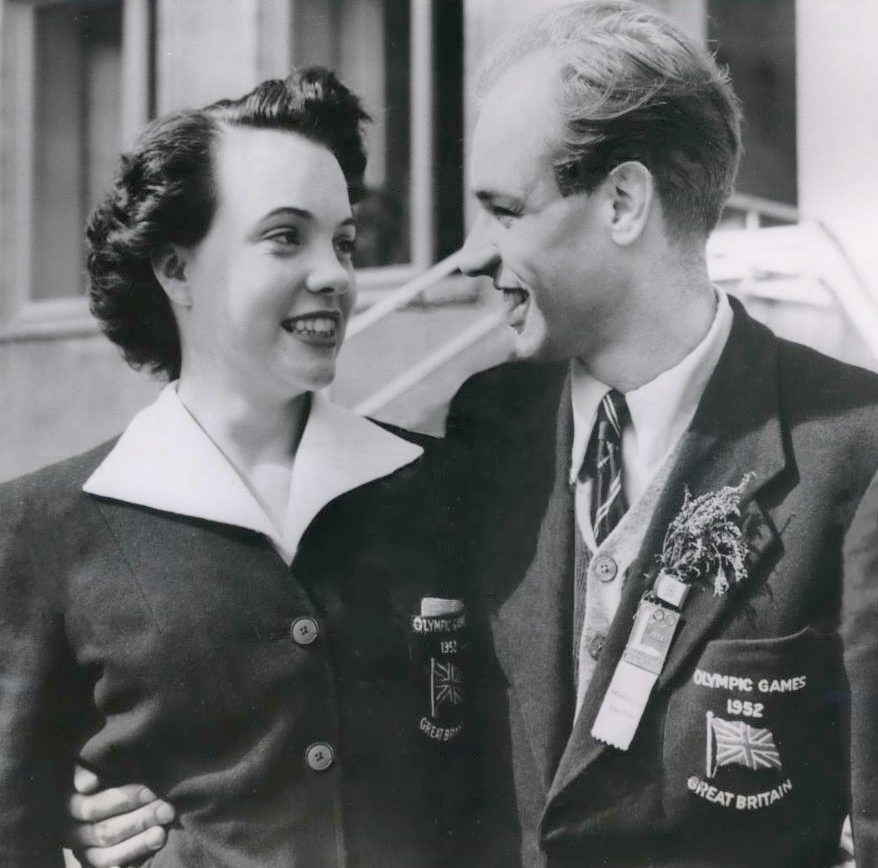
- Paul and Foulds in 1952

Personal information
- Born: 21 November 1928 Romford, London, England
- Died: 23 December 2013 (aged 85) London, England

Sport
- Sport: Fencing
- Event(s): Foil, sabre, épée
Medal record
Representing United Kingdom
World Championships
Bronze medal – third place	1955 Rome	Team foil
Representing England
British Empire and Commonwealth Games
Gold medal – first place	1958 Cardiff	Ind. foil
Gold medal – first place	1958 Cardiff	Team foil

Raymond Rudolf Valentine Paul (21 November 1928 – 23 December 2013) was a British fencer.

== Fencing career ==
Paul competed at the 1952 and 1956 Summer Olympics with the best individual result of eighth place in the foil in 1956. He won four national foil titles at the British Fencing Championships, from 1953 to 1958. and a bronze medal in the team foil at the 1955 World Championships.

He represented the England team and won a double gold in the foil individual and team events at the 1958 British Empire and Commonwealth Games in Cardiff, Wales.

== Personal life ==
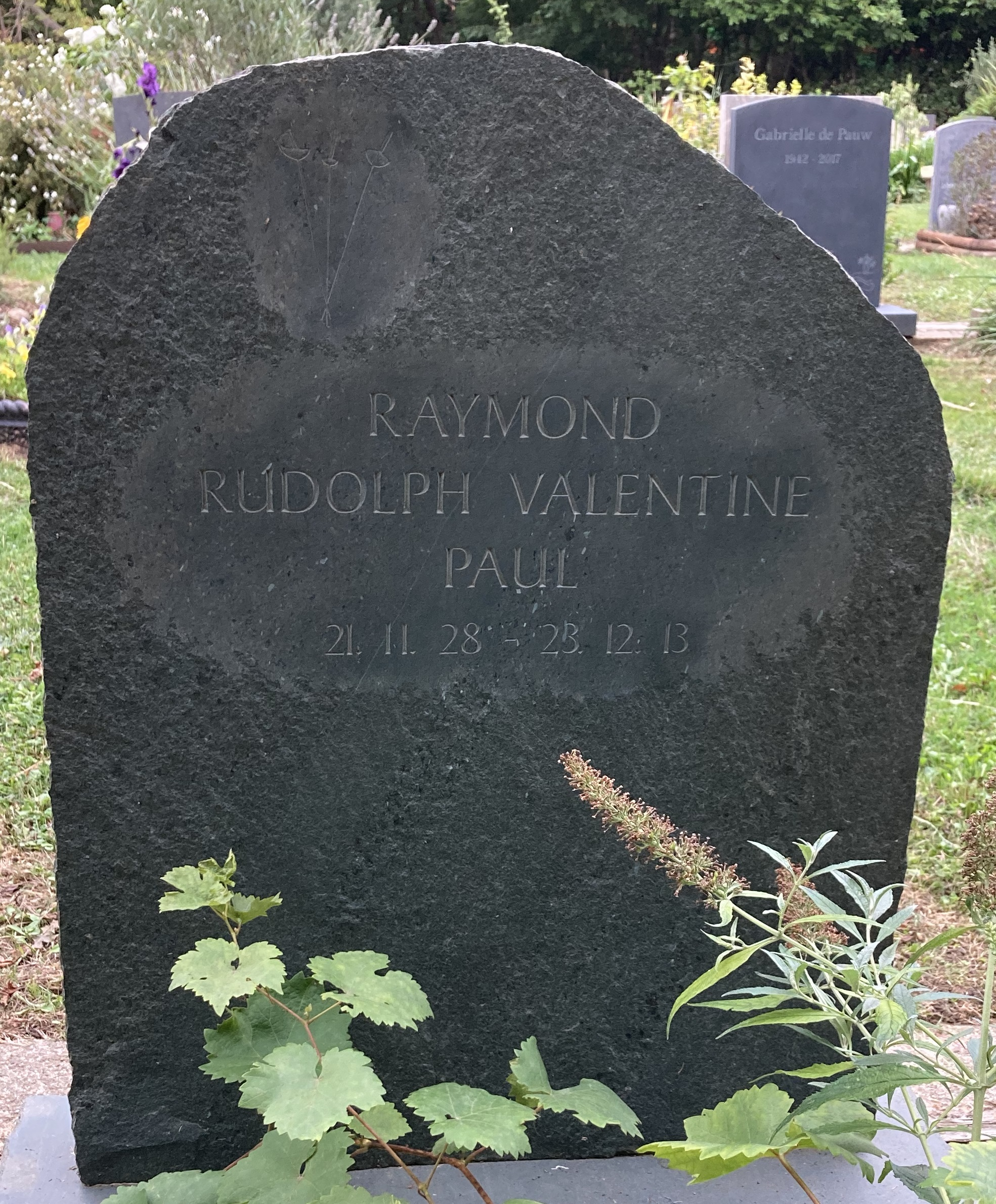
Grave of Raymond Paul in Highgate Cemetery

Paul was the son of a French fencing master, who settled in London. He was the brother of René Paul, ex-husband of June Foulds-Paul, uncle of Barry Paul and Graham Paul and father of Steven Paul.

In the 1955 film The Dark Avenger, Raymond Paul doubled for Errol Flynn during one sword duel, due to Flynn's taking ill at the time.

Paul died on 23 December 2013 and was buried on the eastern side of Highgate Cemetery.
