= Steven Paul (fencer) =

British fencer (1954–2019)

Personal information
- Born: 28 September 1954 London, England
- Died: 26 April 2019 (aged 64)

Sport
- Sport: Fencing

Steven Paul (28 September 1954 – 26 April 2019) was a British international fencer. He competed at the 1980, 1984 and 1992 Summer Olympics. He also appeared as Pierce Brosnan's stunt-double in the film Die Another Day.

== Fencing career ==
In addition to competing at three Olympic Games he was a three times British fencing champion, winning the épée title at the British Fencing Championships in 1980, 1983 and 1993.

== Personal life ==
Steven Paul's family heritage was as part of a famous fencing and athletics family, including father Raymond Paul, uncle René Paul, Mother June Paul (Foulds), cousins Graham Paul and Barry Paul, grandson of Leon Paul. In later life he became the Head Coach and Chairman of the Royal Tunbridge Wells Fencing Club, as well as coaching at several other prestigious fencing clubs such as the Lansdowne Club and Haverstock Fencing Club.

In 2015, he was diagnosed with Motor Neurone Disease, which caused him to give up many but not all of his coaching positions. At age 64, Paul unexpectedly died following a fall on an Easter family holiday in Spain, 26 April 2019. His body was repatriated to the UK by partner Karen, who subsequently organised a justgiving crowdfunding appeal which raised £16,900 towards the associated costs. The Annual SPITFIRE match is held in his memory to raise money for Motor Neurone Disease Association.
