= Terry Beddard =

British fencer (1901–1966)

Personal information
- Born: 30 October 1901 Suva, Fiji
- Died: 21 August 1966 (aged 64) Ealing, London

Sport
- Sport: Fencing

Terence Elliott Beddard (30 October 1901 – 21 August 1966) was a British fencer. He competed at the 1936 and 1948 Summer Olympics. In 1939, he won the épée title at the British Fencing Championships.
