= Archibald Corble =

British fencer (1883–1944)

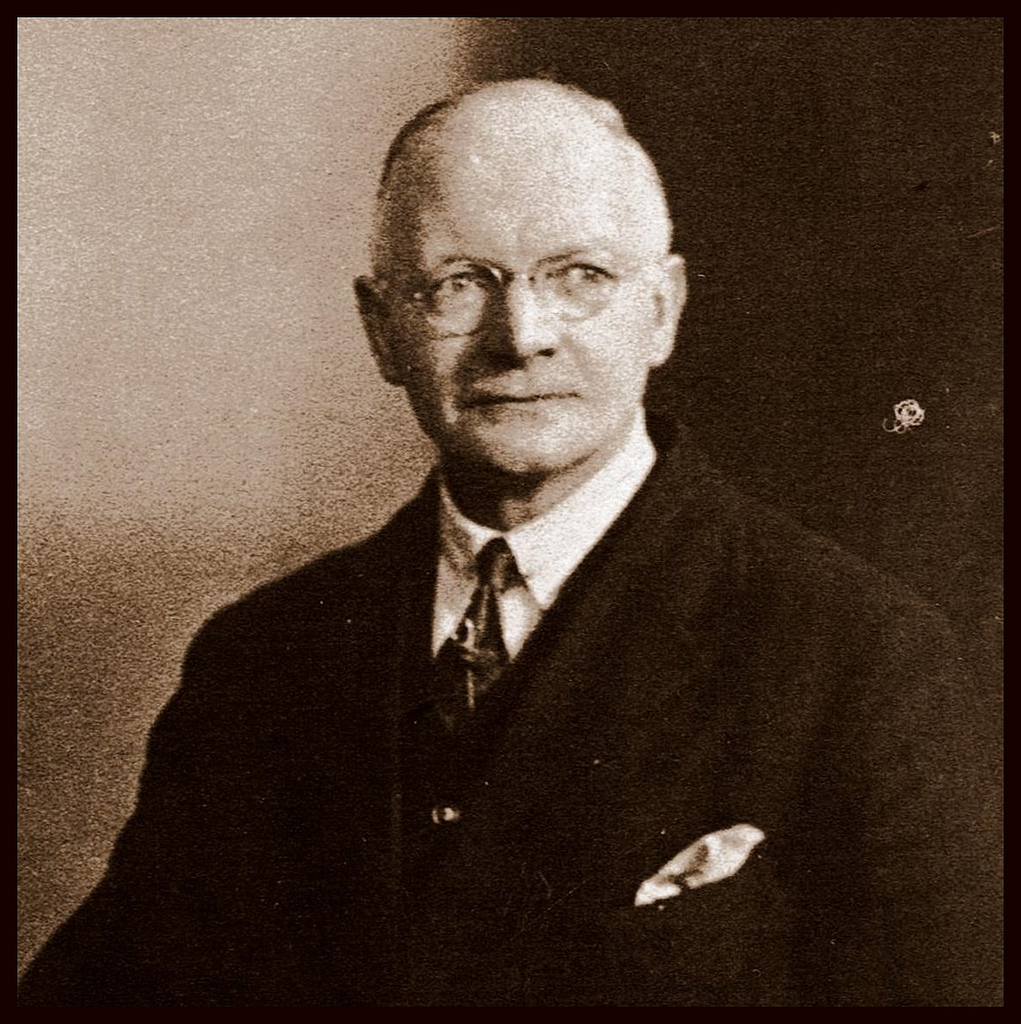

Personal information
- Full name: Archibald Harrison Corble
- Nationality: British
- Born: 26 May 1883 Waltham Abbey, Essex, England
- Died: 22 January 1944 (aged 60) Wandsworth, London, England

Sport
- Sport: Fencing

Archibald Corble (26 May 1883 – 22 January 1944) was a British fencer. His weapon was the sabre. He competed at three Olympic Games - 1912, 1924 and 1928. He was twice British Sabre Champion at the British Fencing Championships, in 1922 and 1927. He was the great-uncle of the playwright and director Simon Corble.

The Corble Cup is now competed for annually as the British national sabre trophy.

Corble was a great collector of both swords and books on fencing. At the end of his life he donated most of his vast collection to the Catholic University of Leuven. The collection contains around 1,900 items, dating from the 15th to the 20th century, mainly from France, England, South America, Italy and Germany. Notable are the personal details, such as letters addressed to Corble, photographs of fencers, notes and comments, which are an integral part of the collection. Corble, as well as the previous owners, such as Cyril Matthey, Alfred Hutton, JR Garcia Donnell, Frederick Pollock and Jacopo Gelli, opted for new personal bindings, added ex-libri to their copies.
