= H. Evan James =

British fencer

Harry Evan James
Personal information
- Full name: Harry Evan James
- Born: 20 November 1865 Holborn, London, England
- Died: 13 March 1951 (aged 85) Lewisham, London, England

Sport
- Sport: Fencing

Harry Evan James (20 November 1865 – 13 March 1951) was a British fencer. He competed at the 1908 and 1920 Summer Olympics. His son Jack was also an accomplished fencer who competed in the 1928 Summer Olympics. In 1901, he won the men's foil title at the British Fencing Championships.
