= Simon Corble =

English playwright, director and performer

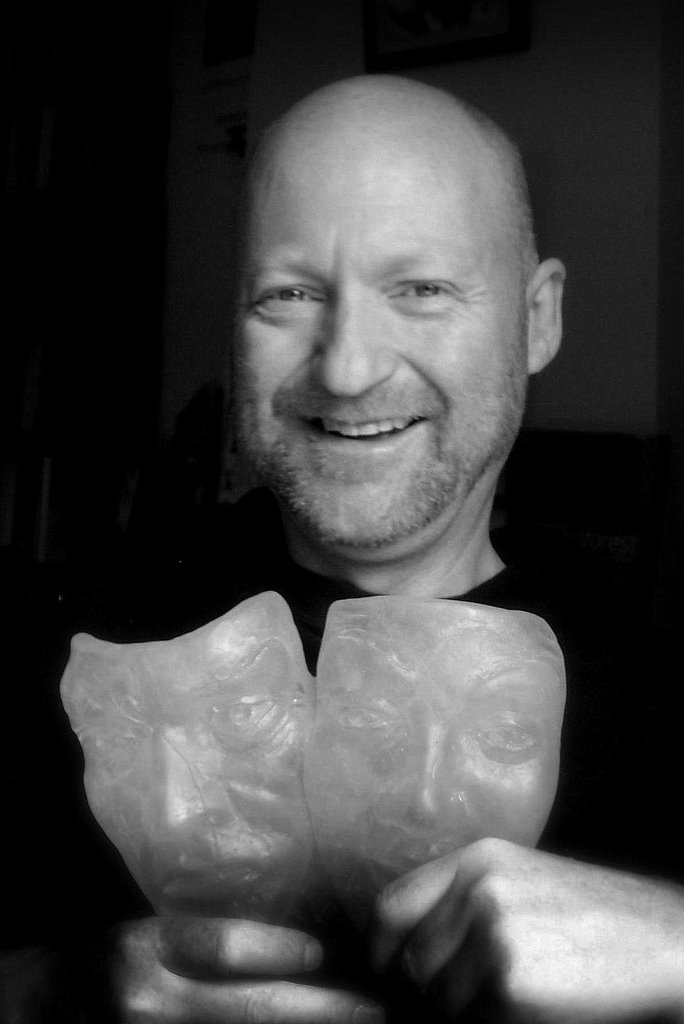
- Corble receiving the Manchester Evening News award 1997 for his 1997 season with Midsommer Actor's Company
- Writing career
- Notable work: The 39 Steps (play) The Hound of the Baskervilles (play) White Light White Peak (poetry)

Simon Corble is an English playwright, poet and theatre director. He is the great-nephew of Archibald Corble, the British fencer. He grew up in rural Oxfordshire, the son of a country vicar. The family moved north in 1974, and at the age of sixteen he played Hamlet at Lymm Grammar School, Cheshire and "never looked back". After training as an actor at Manchester Polytechnic (now Manchester Metropolitan University) he went on to create his own dramatic works. He has explored the potential of site-specific theatre in both his own works and those of others. On his website he writes that his strengths lie in "comedy, site-specific and promenade theatre, audio work, directing Shakespeare, and in creating unique theatrical experiences". His first full collection of poetry, White Light White Peak, was published by Fly on the Wall Press in 2019.

== Writing ==
According to Tony Craze and Katie Brannigan, Corble writes "in obeyance of the unities of time and space – applying realistic and parallel scales between worlds of performance and real environment (short promenades for short distances traveled in a fictional world, careful allotment of time at each stationary point).

Temporal and spatial settings for his work were seen to be of paramount importance. For The Woodlanders, this writer's research included a close study of the North of England countryside, focusing on a site with the largest, most remote wooded area, accessible only by a mile and a half trek."

Simon Corble has always preferred to work alongside actors in creating scripts, using improvisations on given events and themes and working in the physical aspects of performance at the same time. This was how he and Nobby Dimon created the original script and concept for The 39 Steps.

Poetry has always been a part of Simon Corble's creative output; many of his plays, in particular, SWARD!, The Hound of the Baskervilles and the alliterative script of Sir Gawain and the Green Knight, are written partly or wholly in verse. It was his move into the rural Peak District of England, followed by the loss of two close friends who took their own lives within six months of each other which expanded his poetic output.

Much of Simon Corble's poetry is lyrical in form and inspired by the natural world.

== Midsommer Actors' Company ==
Corble was the founder and artistic director of the Midsommer Actors' Company (1990–1999) which created open-air site-specific theatre with an emphasis on the actor's performance and the influence of working in a natural environment has had on this.

Productions were both site-specific and promenade, (for which Corble also used the term 'Walkabout') with the audience moving some distance across a given landscape. For the company's first production, The Tempest, the actors and audience were stranded by the tide on Hilbre Island in the Dee estuary for six hours at a stretch.

The company moved indoors in 1997 to stage The 39 Steps, a play Corble co-wrote with Nobby Dimon which, proved to have a long life in theatres all over the world, with runs in London's West End and in Broadway. The adaptation, written for a cast of four actors and funded by a £1,000 Yorkshire Arts Grant, premiered in 1995 before an audience of 90 people at the Georgian Theatre Royal in Richmond, North Yorkshire, before embarking on a tour of village halls across the north of England.

== Major Productions ==
- The Tempest, 1990, Hilbre Island
- The Woodlanders, 1991, Hardcastle Crags, W. Yorks and Royden Park, Wirral
- Treasure Island, 1991, Hilbre Island
- Sir Gawain and the Green Knight, 1992, tour of Northern England
- Macbeth, 1993, toured to diverse locations, including inner-city Manchester
- The Wonderland Adventures of Alice, 1994, Heaton Park and national tour
- As You Like It, 1995, tour of Northern England and the Arundel Festival
- The Hound of the Baskervilles, 1995/6, Brimham Rocks, N. Yorks and on tour
- A Midsommer Night's Dreame, 1997, tour of Northern England
- The 39 Steps, 1997/8, Manchester and the London fringe
- Of Mice and Men, 1997/8, national tour
- Dracula the Undead, 1998, national tour
- Much Ado About Nothing, 1999

== Found Theatre ==
Simon Corble created Found Theatre in 2005, with the aim of telling powerful stories through simple means.

The company's first production was The Fisherman and his Soul, in 2005, which began with improvisational workshops and then early rehearsals with the four actors in the environment of the mountainous Greek island of Ikaria. Here, Simon Corble had previously taken time out from the theatre-world, leading walking-tour groups. His aim was to experiment with an 'environment to black box' approach, almost the reverse to the process that had been his method with Midsommer. This approach was inspired by obsersvations on the power of actors' performances after they had been performing in natural locations, often on a lengthy tour with Midsommer and had then given a final performance in a neutral, indoor setting.

Found Theatre's second major production (2007) was a revival of Simon Corble's 'The Hound of the Baskervilles' funded by the Isle of Man Arts Council and performed around the town and castle of Peel.

This was followed by an adaptation of The Signalman, from the Charles Dickens ghost story, in 2008-10, paired with Dicken's disturbing early monologue, The Madman. which appears in The Pickwick Papers.

Found Theatre's final production, created in 2019 was Simon Corble's one-man, multimedia performance, with the stage performance directed by Alice Bartlett, of White Light White Peak, combining his poetry with his black-and-white photography and sound recordings from the field.

== Playscripts ==
- The Woodlanders, 1991
- Sir Gawain and the Green Knight, 1992 (a dramatisation of the 14th-century Arthurian romance); it was originally written for The Midsommer Actors' Company in 1992 and played in eight outdoor venues.; Corble later substantially revised the play, which was produced indoors by Cardboard Menagerie at the O'Reilly Theatre, Oxford in February 2014.
- The Wonderland Adventures of Alice
- The Fisherman and his Soul, 1995-2007
- The 39 Steps, 1996
- Dracula, 1998
- The Hound of the Baskervilles
- The Signalman, 2008
- Operation Mincemeat, 2008 (based on the successful British deception plan of the same name in the Second World War)
- Sward! – The Story of a Meadow, 2010

== Publications ==
- The Hound of the Baskervilles
- White Light White Peak
