= Cecil Kershaw =

England international rugby union player & Olympic fencer

Personal information
- Born: Cecil Ashworth Kershaw; 3 February 1895 Dacca, Dhaka, Bangladesh
- Died: 1 November 1972 (aged 77) Worthing, West Sussex, England

Rugby union career
- Position: Scrum-half
Senior career
Years	Team	Apps	(Points)
- United Services Portsmouth RFC
–	Navy		
International career
Years	Team	Apps	(Points)
1920–1923	England	16	(6)

Sport
- Sport: Fencing

Cecil Ashworth Kershaw (3 February 1895 – 1 November 1972) was a British Olympian and England rugby international during the 1920s.

== Fencing career ==
Kershaw was an Olympic fencer who competed for Great Britain at two Olympic Games He was a three times British fencing champion, winning the sabre title at the British Fencing Championships in 1920, 1925 and 1926.

== Rugby ==
He was also a rugby union player who represented the Royal Navy as a scrum-half and was capped 16 times by England between 1920 and 1923. Kershaw formed a notable half-back partnership with W. J. A. Davies for both the Navy and England; in their 14 matches together for England, they never finished on the losing side.
