= Quentin Berriman =

British fencer

Personal information
- Nationality: British (Welsh)
- Born: 12 May 1964 (age 62) Cwmbran, Wales

Fencing career
- Sport: Fencing
- Weapon: épée
- Hand: right
Medal record
Men's épée
Representing Wales
British Championships
Gold medal – first place	1995	epee
Gold medal – first place	1996	epee
Gold medal – first place	1997	epee
Gold medal – first place	1998	epee
Gold medal – first place	1999	epee
Gold medal – first place	2002	epee

Nigel Quentin Berriman (born 1964) is a Welsh former épée fencer.

He won the British épée national title on six occasions at the British Fencing Championships in 1995, 1996, 1997, 1998, 1999 and 2002. He was captain of both the Welsh and British teams.
