= Philip Marsh =

British fencer

Personal information
- Born: October 23, 1994 (age 31)

Fencing career
- Sport: Fencing
- Country: United Kingdom
- Weapon: Épée
- Hand: left-handed
- Club: Brixton Fencing Club
- FIE ranking: current ranking
Medal record
World Junior Championships
Gold medal – first place	2011 Dead Sea	Individual
Junior World Cup
Gold medal – first place	2012 Gothenburg	Individual

Philip Marsh (born 23 October 1994) is a British épée fencer and former junior world champion. His clubs are Brixton Fencing Club and Grenoble Parmentier.

He participated at the 2011 Junior World Fencing Championships for the United Kingdom, winning the gold medal. In addition, he has competed for the United Kingdom at numerous World Cups, winning a silver medal in Gothenburg, Sweden, in 2012.

In 2011, he won the épée title at the British Fencing Championships.
