= Ilona Vargha =

Hungarian fencer

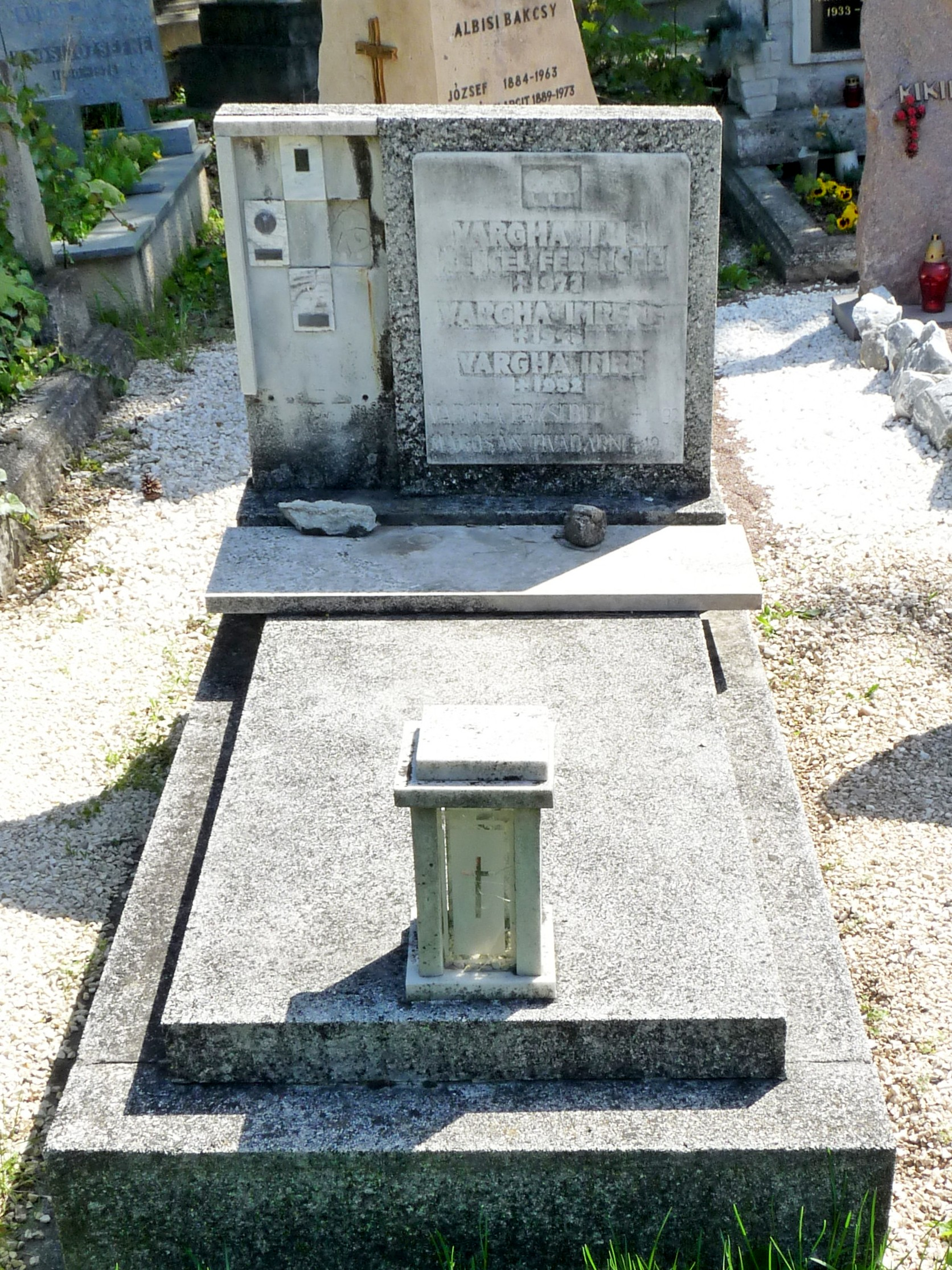
- Grave of Ilona

Personal information
- Born: 11 June 1907 Budapest, Austria-Hungary
- Died: 19 April 1973 (aged 62) Budapest, Hungary

Sport
- Sport: Fencing

Ilona Vargha (11 June 1907 – 19 April 1973) was a Hungarian fencer. She competed in the women's individual foil event at the 1936 Summer Olympics.
