= Hedwig Haß =

German fencer

Personal information
- Born: 28 July 1902 Frankfurt, German Empire
- Died: 2 January 1992 (aged 89)

Sport
- Sport: Fencing

Hedwig Haß (28 July 1902 – 2 January 1992) was a German fencer. She competed in the women's individual foil event at the 1936 Summer Olympics.
