= Ingeborg Scheel =

Swiss fencer

Personal information
- Born: 15 October 1907

Sport
- Sport: Fencing

Ingeborg Scheel (born 15 October 1907, date of death unknown) was a Swiss fencer. She competed in the women's individual foil event at the 1936 Summer Olympics.
