= Ellen Hamilton =

Swedish fencer

Personal information
- Born: 16 December 1889 Karlskrona, Sweden
- Died: 1 November 1970 (aged 80) Stockholm, Sweden

Sport
- Sport: Fencing

Ellen Hamilton (16 December 1889 – 1 November 1970) was a Swedish fencer. She competed in the women's individual foil event at the 1924 Summer Olympics.
