= Yvonne Conte =

French fencer (1893–1959)

Personal information
- Born: 6 February 1893
- Died: 3 September 1959 (aged 66)

Sport
- Sport: Fencing

Yvonne Conte (6 February 1893 – 3 September 1959) was a French fencer. She competed in the individual women's foil competition at the 1924 Summer Olympics.
