= Alex O'Connell (fencer) =

British fencer (born 1988)

Personal information
- Full name: Alexander James O'Connell
- Nationality: British (English)
- Born: 17 April 1988 (age 38)
- Height: 1.9 m (6 ft 3 in)

Sport
- Sport: Fencing

Alexander James O'Connell (born 17 April 1988) is a sabre fencer who competed for Great Britain at the 2008 Olympic Games.

== Sporting career ==
In 2005, O’Connell won the cadet world championship in Austria. In the following year, he was selected for the England under-20 Commonwealth team in India, where he won gold in the individual and team events. In 2007, he placed second at the Junior Men's Sabre World Cup in Göppingen, Germany.

He competed for Great Britain at the 2008 Olympic Games, where he seeded 39th, and was eliminated by Nikolay Kovalev in the first round of competition, narrowly losing 15-14.

He was a three times British fencing champion, winning the sabre title at the British Fencing Championships in 2005, 2006 and 2010.

O'Connell was one of a group of four fencers who unsuccessfully appealed their rejection from the British team at the London 2012 Olympics.

== Personal life ==
O'Connell grew up in Brentwood, Essex, with a brother three years older, and a sister four years younger; both siblings also fenced. His parents, of Irish descent, are a solicitor and property developer, and a part-time teacher.

Educated at Brentwood School in Essex and Churchill College, Cambridge, where he studied Classics, O'Connell is now a lawyer with Freshfields Bruckhaus Derringer in London.

In 2017, O'Connell married author Ruth Gilligan in Ireland, after they met in college in 2008, and became engaged in 2016.
