= Roger Tredgold =

British fencer (1911–1975)

Personal information
- Born: 23 October 1911 Guildford, England
- Died: 24 December 1975 (aged 64) Heathfield, East Sussex, England

Sport
- Sport: Fencing

Roger Francis Tredgold (23 October 1911 – 24 December 1975) was a British fencer. He competed at the 1936, 1948 and 1952 Summer Olympics. He was a six times British fencing champion, winning the sabre title at the British Fencing Championships in 1937, 1939, 1947, 1948, 1949 and 1955.

He was the son of the neurologist A. F. Tredgold and his wife Zoe Hanbury. He was educated at Winchester College and Trinity College, Cambridge. In his professional life he was a distinguished psychiatrist and writer.
