= Gerda Gantz =

Romanian fencer (born 1915)

Personal information
- Born: 17 December 1914

Sport
- Sport: Fencing

Gerda Gantz (born 17 December 1914, date of death unknown) was a Romanian fencer. She competed in the women's individual foil event at the 1936 Summer Olympics.
