= Olga Oelkers =

German fencer (1887–1969)

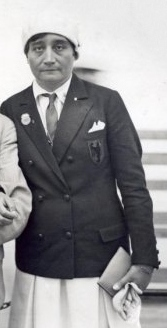
- Olga Oelkers at the 1928 Olympics

Personal information
- Born: 21 May 1887 Berlin, German Empire
- Died: 10 January 1969 (aged 81) Frankfurt, West Germany

Sport
- Sport: Fencing
- Event: Foil
- Club: FC Offenbach
- Coached by: Arturo Gazzera
Medal record
Representing Germany
Olympic Games
Bronze medal – third place	1928 Amsterdam	Foil, Individual

Olga Oelkers (21 May 1887 – 10 January 1969) was a German foil fencer. She competed at the 1928 and 1936 Olympics and won a bronze medal in 1928, behind her teammate Helene Mayer who won gold. At the European championships Oelkers won a team gold medal in 1936, a silver in 1934, and a bronze in 1935. After retiring from fencing Oelkers became a housewife and raised five children.
