= Yvonne Bornand =

Swiss fencer

Personal information
- Born: 16 May 1907
- Died: 19 May 1988 (aged 81)

Sport
- Sport: Fencing

Yvonne Bornand (16 May 1907 – 19 May 1988) was a Swiss fencer. She competed in the women's individual foil event at the 1936 Summer Olympics.
