= Adèle Christiaens =

Belgian fencer (1909–1977)

Personal information
- Born: Adèle Eléanore Adolphine Christiaens; 28 January 1909 Ixelles, Belgium
- Died: 12 February 1977 (aged 68) Liège, Belgium

Sport
- Sport: Fencing

Adèle Eléanore Adolphine Christiaens (28 January 1909 – 12 February 1977) was a Belgian fencer. She competed in the women's individual foil event at the 1936 and 1948 Summer Olympics. Christiaens died in Liège on 12 February 1977, at the age of 68.
