= Linda Strachan =

British fencer (born 1961)

Personal information
- Born: 18 October 1961 (age 64) Forest Gate, London, England

Sport
- Sport: Fencing

Linda Strachan BEM (born 18 October 1961) is a British fencer. She competed in the women's foil events at the 1988 and 1992 Summer Olympics. In June 2015, she was awarded with the British Empire Medal in the Queen's Birthday Honours.
