= Marcelle Bory =

French fencer (1908–1929)

Personal information
- Full name: Marcelle Marie Bory
- Born: 22 March 1908 Paris, France
- Died: 14 February 1929 (aged 20) Paris, France

Sport
- Sport: Fencing

Marcelle Bory (22 March 1908 – 14 February 1929) was a French fencer. She competed in the individual women's foil competition at the 1924 Summer Olympics.
