= Thea Kellner =

Romanian fencer

Personal information
- Born: 6 March 1914

Sport
- Sport: Fencing

Thea Kellner (born 6 March 1914) was a Romanian fencer. She competed in the women's individual foil event at the 1936 Summer Olympics.
