= Erna Sondheim =

German fencer (1904–2008)

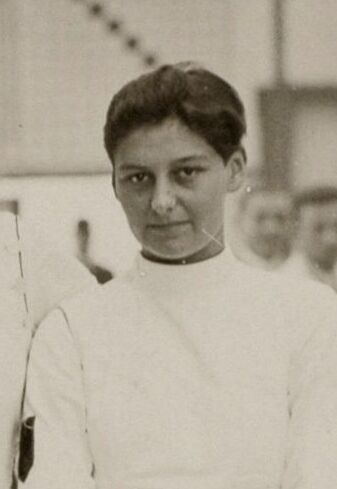
- Sondheim in 1928

Personal information
- Born: 17 February 1904 Gauting, Germany
- Died: 9 January 2008 (aged 103)

Sport
- Sport: Fencing

Erna Sondheim (17 February 1904 – 9 January 2008) was a German fencer. She competed in the women's individual foil event at the 1928 Summer Olympics.

== See also ==
- List of centenarians (sportspeople)
