= Hilary Cawthorne =

British fencer (born 1951)

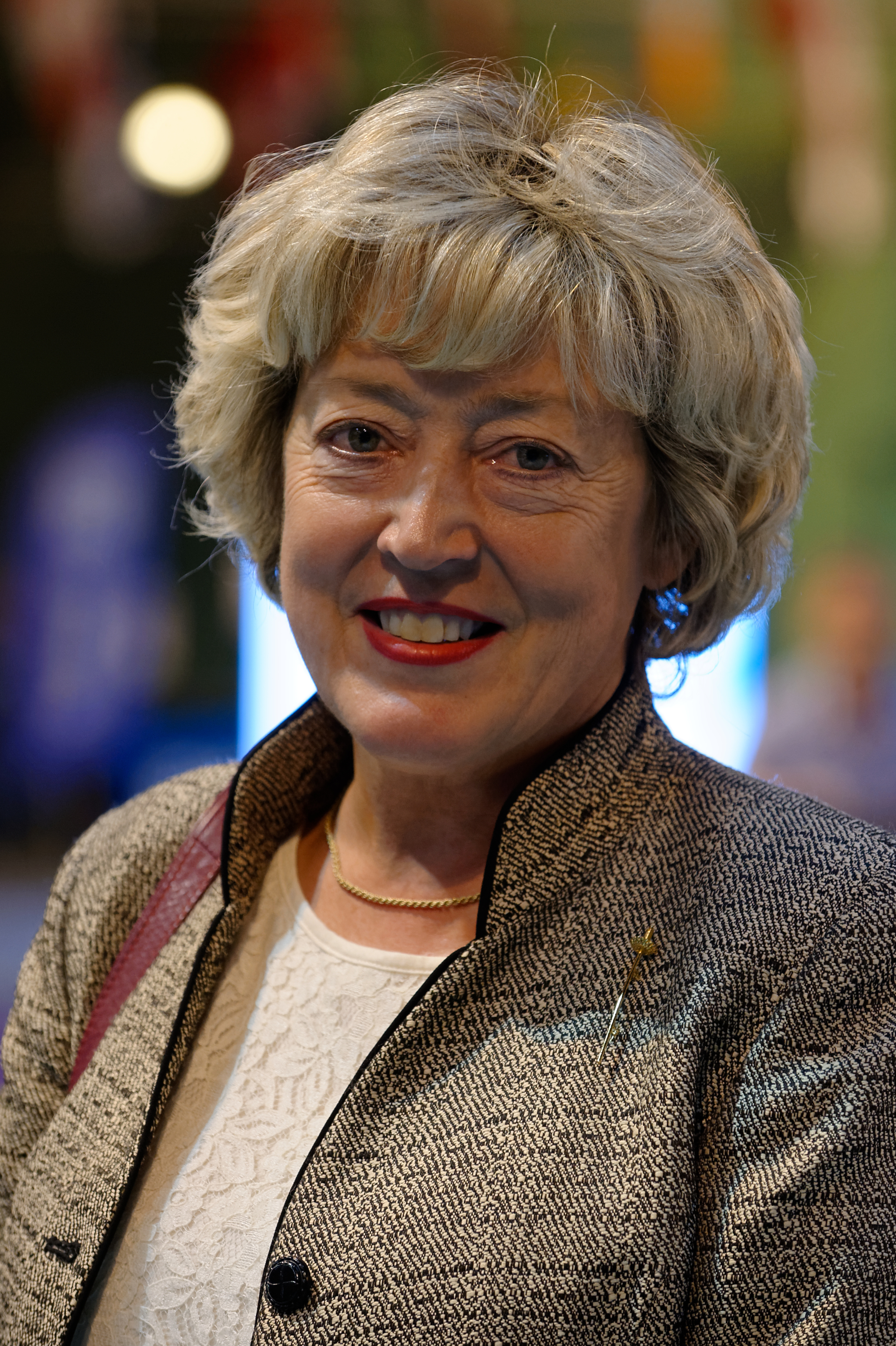
- Hilary Philbin in 2015

Personal information
- Born: 31 December 1951 (age 74) Islington, England
- Height: 1.62 m (5 ft 4 in)
- Weight: 52 kg (115 lb)

Fencing career
- Sport: Fencing
- Weapon: Foil
- Club: Allen Fencing Club

Hilary Cawthorne MBE (born 31 December 1951) is a British fencer. She competed in the women's individual foil events at the 1976 and 1980 Summer Olympics.

In 2013, she was appointed president of British Fencing.

As Hilary Fredricke Cawthorne, she was appointed Member of the Order of the British Empire (MBE) in the 2017 New Year Honours for services to fencing.

== Personal life ==
Her father is Derrick Cawthorne and in 1985 married British Sabre Champion Jim Philbin.
