= A. F. Tredgold =

British neurologist (1870–1952)

A. F. Tredgold TD FRSE FRCP
- Born: Alfred Frank Tredgold; 5 November 1870; Derby, England, United Kingdom
- Died: 17 September 1952 (aged 81); Guildford, England, United Kingdom
- Occupations: Neurologist, psychiatris

Alfred Frank Tredgold (5 November 1870 – 17 September 1952) was a British neurologist and psychiatrist and expert in Amentia. He also wrote on eugenics from the early 20th century. He was a member of the Eugenics Education Society.

== Life ==
He was born at 49 Liversage Street in Derby on 5 November 1870, the son of Joseph Tredgold, a builder's foreman, and his wife Bessie Smith. He studied medicine at Durham University and graduated in 1899. He immediately began to specialise in mental health, working mainly in London hospitals. He won a scholarship from London County Council to study mental deficiency and worked for two years in London's asylums. This included a period working at the innovative Claybury Hospital under Dr F. W. Mott.

He worked as a GP for two years then in 1905 as physician to the Littleton Home for Defective Children gave evidence to the Royal Commission on the Feeble Minded. His findings came to fruition in the Mental Deficiency Act 1913.

In 1914, he was elected a Fellow of the Royal Society of Edinburgh. His proposers were Sir Thomas Clouston, Sir German Sims Woodhead, Sir James Barr, and Edwin Bramwell.

From 1905, he had served as an officer in the Territorial Force, so at the outbreak of the First World War he was immediately required to serve. He served with the 2nd Battalion, Queen's Royal Regiment (West Surrey) in Gallipoli, Egypt and Sinai. The authorities rejected his offer to serve in the Royal Army Medical Corps advising on mental health as the usefulness of this was yet to be recognised. He was invalided out of active service in 1916 due to dysentery.

He received his doctorate (MD) in 1919. He remained linked to the Territorial Army for most of his life.

He became a neurologist to the Royal Surrey County Hospital. He lectured at the Bethlem Hospital (the legendary Bedlam) and Maudsley Hospital. He served on the Brock Committee on forced sterilisation, but advocated voluntary sterilisation.

In 1947, he developed glaucoma and lost his sight in one eye.

He died at home, "St Martins" on Clandon Road in Guildford on 17 September 1952.

== Family ==
In 1899, he was married to Zoe Hanbury (d.1947) daughter of F A Hanbury, a barrister.

His children included Roger Francis Tregold (1911–1975) who aided in his later publications. He was also an Olympic fencer.

His daughter Joan Alison Tregold (1903–1989) was Principal of Cheltenham Ladies' College from 1953 to 1964.

== Publications ==
- Mental Deficiency: Amentia (1908)
- Moral Imbecility (1921)
- Inheritance and Educability
- A Manual of Psychological Medicine (1943)
- A Textbook of Mental Deficiency (1956)
- The Problem of the Feeble-Minded
- Mental Retardation
