= Hanna Olsen =

Swedish fencer

Personal information
- Born: 23 June 1889 Karlskrona, Sweden
- Died: 10 June 1990 (aged 100) Kristinehamn, Sweden

Sport
- Sport: Fencing

Hanna Olsen (23 June 1889 – 10 June 1990) was a Swedish fencer who competed at the 1924 and 1928 Summer Olympics. In Paris in 1924 she competed in the women's foil event, but was eliminated in the semi-finals, placing fourth in her pool. Four years later she competed in the same event, but did not win any bouts. She was born in Karlskrona and was a member of the Stockholm's Kvinnliga Fäktklubb. She was a six-time Swedish national champion in the women's individual foil, winning the title in 1918, 1919, 1923, 1925, 1926, and 1931. She died in Kristinehamn less than two weeks before her 101st birthday.
