= Madeleine Scrève =

Belgian fencer

Personal information
- Born: 28 August 1912
- Died: 27 March 2006 (aged 93)

Sport
- Sport: Fencing

Madeleine Scrève (28 August 1912 – 27 March 2006) was a Belgian fencer. She competed in the women's individual foil event at the 1936 Summer Olympics.
