= Emma Fitting =

Swiss fencer

Personal information
- Born: 21 November 1900
- Died: 13 November 1986 (aged 85)

Sport
- Sport: Fencing

Emma Fitting-Ramel (21 November 1900 – 13 November 1986) was a Swiss fencer. She competed in the women's individual foil at the 1924 Summer Olympics.
