= Dudley Tredger =

Personal information
- Nationality: British (English)
- Born: 15 November 1980 (age 45) London, England

Sport
- Sport: Fencing
- Event: Épée

Dudley Charles Tredger (born 15 November 1980 in London, England) is an épée fencer, and Commonwealth Épée Champion, winning gold at Largs in 2014.

== Career ==
Dudley fenced for England at the 2002 and 2010 Commonwealth Fencing Championships in Newcastle, Australia, winning gold and silver medals in the team event and two bronze medals as an individual.

In 2012, he won the épée title at the British Fencing Championships and his other fencing achievements include the final 8 at Luxembourg A Grade, 1st Bristol Open 2001, 1st Sussex Open 2001, 3rd Welsh Open 2002 and best young fencer on two occasions during his schooling at Hazelwick School.

== Personal life ==
He works as an economics teacher at Whitgift School
