= Agathe Turgis =

French fencer

Personal information
- Born: 19 January 1892
- Died: 20 August 1980 (aged 88)

Sport
- Sport: Fencing

Agathe Turgis (19 January 1892 – 20 August 1980) was a French fencer. She competed in the women's individual foil event at the 1936 Summer Olympics.
