= Catharina Maria van der Klaauw =

Dutch fencer (1915–2011)

Personal information
- Born: 4 December 1915 The Hague, Netherlands
- Died: 11 August 2011 (aged 95) The Hague, Netherlands

Sport
- Sport: Fencing

Catharina "Toos" Maria van der Klaauw (4 December 1915 – 11 August 2011) was a Dutch fencer. She competed in the women's individual foil event at the 1936 Summer Olympics.
