= Oda Mahaut =

French fencer

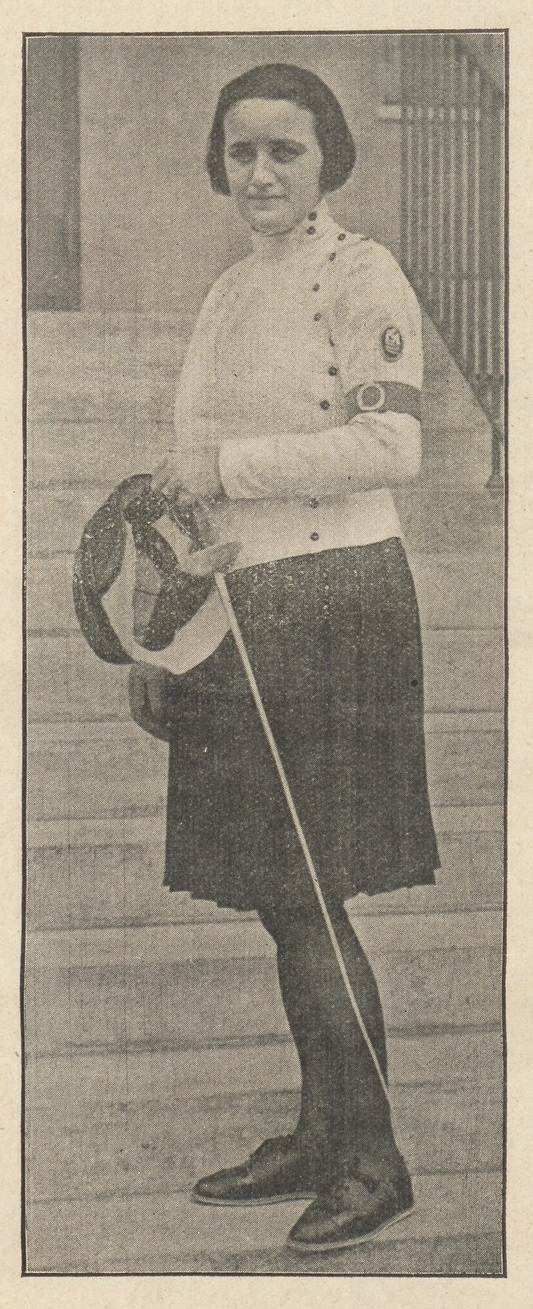

Personal information
- Born: 16 October 1887
- Died: 19 May 1955 (aged 67)

Sport
- Sport: Fencing

Oda Mahaut (16 October 1887 – 19 May 1955) was a French fencer. She competed in the women's individual foil event at the 1928 Summer Olympics.
