= Margit Danÿ =

Hungarian fencer

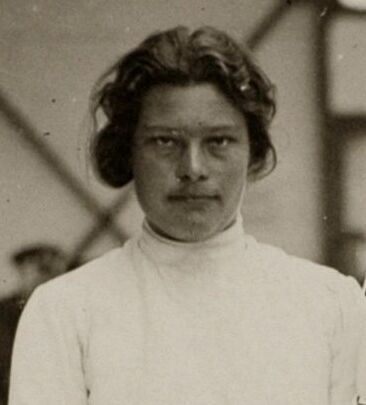
- Margit Danÿ (1928)

Personal information
- Born: 5 February 1906 Arad, Austria-Hungary
- Died: 22 January 1975 (aged 68) Athens, Greece

Sport
- Sport: Fencing

Margit Danÿ (5 February 1906 – 22 January 1975) was a Hungarian fencer. She competed in the women's individual foil at the 1928 and 1932 Summer Olympics.
