= Liz Thurley =

British fencer (born 1959)

Liz Thurley (née Wood)
Personal information
- Born: 6 January 1959 (age 67) Wanstead, London, England

Sport
- Sport: Fencing

Liz Thurley (née Wood) (born 6 January 1959) is a British fencer. She competed in the women's individual and team foil events at the 1984 and 1988 Summer Olympics.

She was a six times British champion in the foil at the British Fencing Championships, twice under her maiden name of Liz Wood and four times as Liz Thurley.
