= Elisabeth Grasser =

Austrian fencer

Personal information
- Born: 7 May 1904
- Died: 14 August 2002 (aged 98)

Sport
- Sport: Fencing

Elisabeth Grasser (7 May 1904 – 14 August 2002) was an Austrian fencer. She competed in the women's individual foil event at the 1936 Summer Olympics, finishing eighth.
