= Denise Kramer-Scholer =

Swiss fencer

Personal information
- Born: 9 September 1910
- Died: 30 January 1993 (aged 82)

Sport
- Sport: Fencing

Denise Kramer-Scholer (9 September 1910 – 30 January 1993) was a Swiss fencer. She competed in the women's individual foil event at the 1936 Summer Olympics.
