= Ian Campbell-Gray =

British soldier & international fencer (1901-1946)

- Campbell-Gray in 1924

Personal information
- Born: 14 July 1901 London, England
- Died: 2 October 1946 (aged 45)

Sport
- Sport: Fencing

Lieutenant-Colonel Sir Ian Douglas Campbell-Gray (14 July 1901 – 21 March 1946) was a British soldier serving in the Royal Engineers and an international fencer.

== Biography ==
He competed in the individual and team épée fencing events at the 1936 Summer Olympics. He was a four times British fencing champion, winning the épée title at the British Fencing Championships, in 1926, 1930, 1932 and 1935.

His parents were Henry Tufnell Campbell and Ethel Evely Gray Campbell, Baroness Gray. He married Lady Diana Cavendish on 7 July 1942.
