= Margit Kristian =

Yugoslav fencer (1913–2008)

Personal information
- Born: 27 June 1913
- Died: 20 January 2008 (aged 94)

Sport
- Sport: Fencing

Margit Kristian (27 June 1913 – 20 January 2008) was a Yugoslav fencer. She competed in the women's individual foil event at the 1936 Summer Olympics.
