= Hilda von Puttkammer =

Brazilian fencer

Personal information
- Born: August 13, 1912

Sport
- Sport: Fencing

Hilda von Puttkammer (born 13 August 1912, date of death unknown) was a Brazilian fencer. She competed in the women's individual foil event at the 1936 Summer Olympics.
