= Gwendoline Neligan =

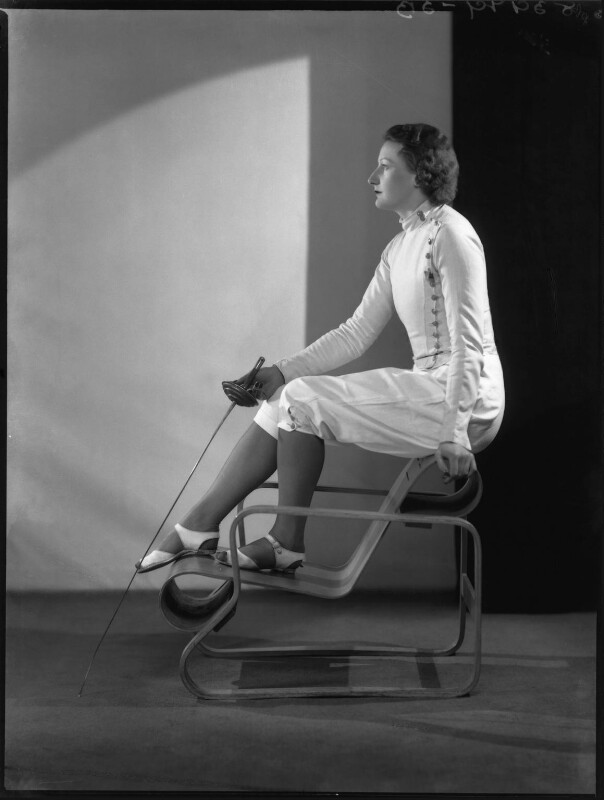
The foil fencer Gwendoline Neligan in 1938

Gwendoline Neligan (23 November 1905 – 10 April 1972) was a British foil fencer, and winner of the 1933 World Fencing Championships.

== Fencing career ==
By winning the 1933 European Championship in Budapest, Gwen Neligan became Britain’s first ‘World’ Champion, as the European Championships were renamed the World Championships in 1937 and retrospectively recognised as such. She was promoted second from her first-round pool and again from her semi-final, losing both times to the Hungarian Erna Bogen-Bogáti. In the final pool of nine she won six fights, but once again lost to Bogen, as well as to With (DEN); however, those two both lost three fights, leaving Neligan clear at the head of the table. At the same championships, she won a silver medal as part of the British women’s team that came second to Hungary, a feat that was repeated the following year.

Neligan reached the final of the European Championship three years in succession. From 1934 to 1938 she was British Champion and would have been a strong contender for the 1936 Olympic title had she not been struck down by appendicitis a fortnight before the Games.

She started fencing with Leon 'Punch' Bertrand and made little progress until, in a fit of inspiration, Bertrand decided to adapt her strong physique to the requirements of the Italian foil. She then began to meet with greater success. Tall and athletic, she had a boisterous nature and enormous determination. Using her reach to dominate her opponents, she became known for making progressive attacks covering the length of the piste.
