= Adelaide Gehrig =

American fencer

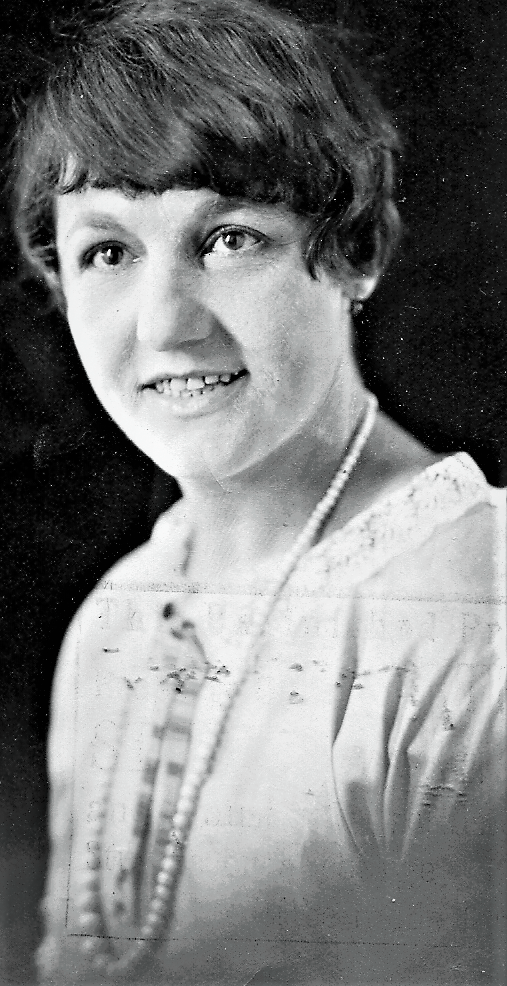

Personal information
- Full name: Adelaide Josephine Pilke née Gehrig
- Nickname: Adeline
- Born: June 11, 1887 Newark, New Jersey, United States
- Died: December 20, 1943 (aged 56) Bronx, New York City, United States

Sport
- Sport: Fencing
- Coached by: Julio Martinez Castello

Adelaide Gehrig (June 11, 1887 – December 20, 1943) was an American fencer.

Gehrig was the only woman in United States foil history to win four consecutive titles. She was born in 1887 in Newark, New Jersey, to German immigrants John Gehrig (a blacksmith) and Maria Gehrig née Lang. Representing the New York Turnverein, Gehrig was AFLA Women's Foil Champion four years in a row (1920 to 1923), a feat unmatched by any other American woman. In 1924, she represented the United States in Paris, in the first Olympic Games in which women competed. She was no relation to Yankees First Baseman Lou Gehrig, although Lou used to work out at the New York Turnverein as a youth.
