= Fernande Tassy =

French fencer

Personal information
- Born: 18 December 1903
- Died: 19 April 1952 (aged 48)

Sport
- Sport: Fencing

Fernande Tassy (18 December 1903 – 19 April 1952) was a French fencer. She competed in the individual women's foil competition at the 1924 Summer Olympics.
