= Elsa Hellquist =

Swedish fencer

Personal information
- Born: 15 June 1886 Stockholm, Sweden
- Died: 7 May 1983 (aged 96) Stockholm, Sweden

Sport
- Sport: Fencing

Elsa Hellquist (15 June 1886 – 7 May 1983) was a Swedish fencer. She competed in the women's individual foil event at the 1924 Summer Olympics.
