= Betty Carnegy-Arbuthnott =

British fencer (1906–1985)

Personal information
- Full name: Elizabeth Carnegy-Arbuthnott
- Born: 4 February 1906 Kensington, England
- Died: 24 January 1985 (aged 78) Richmond, England

Sport
- Sport: Fencing

Elizabeth Carnegy-Arbuthnott (4 February 1906 – 24 January 1985) was a British fencer. She competed at the 1936 and 1948 Summer Olympics.

She was president of the Soroptimist International of London Mayfair in 1969–70.
