= Grete Heckscher =

Danish fencer

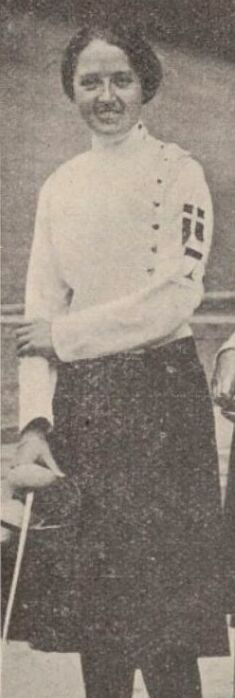

Personal information
- Born: 8 November 1901 Copenhagen, Denmark
- Died: 6 October 1987 (aged 85) Syddanmark, Denmark

Sport
- Sport: Fencing
Medal record
Women's fencing
Representing Denmark
Olympic Games
Bronze medal – third place	1924 Paris	Foil, individual

Grete Heckscher (8 November 1901 – 6 October 1987) was a Danish fencer. She won a bronze medal in the women's individual foil competition at the 1924 Summer Olympics.
