= Ulla Barding-Poulsen =

Danish fencer

Personal information
- Nationality: Danish
- Born: 1 July 1912 Copenhagen, Denmark
- Died: 15 August 2000 (aged 88) Gentofte, Denmark

Sport
- Sport: Fencing
- Team: Akademisk Fægteklub

Ulla Barding-Poulsen (1 July 1912 – 15 August 2000) was a Danish fencer. She competed in the women's individual foil event at the 1936 and 1952 Summer Olympics. In the 1936 Summer Olympics, she made it to the quarter-finals where she was eliminated after winning one bout and losing four bouts. In the 1952 Summer Olympics, at the age of 40, she was eliminated in round one after winning two bouts and losing three bouts.

She was the daughter of foil fencer Yutta Barding.
