= Jeanne Morgenthaler =

Swiss fencer

Personal information
- Born: 1885
- Died: 1974 (aged 88–89)

Sport
- Sport: Fencing

Jeanne Morgenthaler (1885–1974) was a Swiss fencer. She competed in the women's individual foil at the 1924 and 1928 Summer Olympics.
