= Irma Hopper =

American fencer

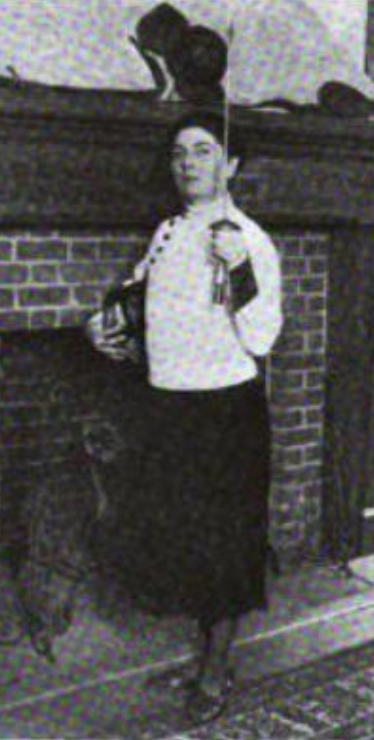
- Irma Hopper in fencing gear, from a 1926 publication

Personal information
- Born: Hennetta Irma Prichard; July 14, 1890 Galesburg, Illinois, United States
- Died: January 29, 1963 (aged 72) New York, New York, United States

Sport
- Sport: Fencing

Hennetta Irma Prichard Hopper (July 14, 1890 – January 29, 1963) was an American fencer, singer, and songwriter. She competed in the women's individual foil events at the 1924 and 1928 Summer Olympics.

== Early life and education ==
Irma Prichard was born in Galesburg, Illinois, the daughter of James R. Prichard and stepdaughter of Etta Stephens Prichard. Her father was a judge. She was a singer, and trained for a stage career, earning her diploma at the American Academy of Dramatic Arts in 1917.

== Career ==
=== Wartime service ===
Hopper served in the Women's Motor Corps during World War I. She was one of the first relief workers on the scene at a munitions plant explosion in Morgan, New Jersey, in 1918.

=== Music and writing ===
Hopper wrote music and lyrics for songs, often for stage use. Among her songs were "Just Like a Violin" (1922), "Just Around the Corner" (1922), "We're in Love" (1922), "The Gold Fish" (1922), "I'm in Love with a Maid" (1922), "The Days of Long Ago" (1922), "Just Try and Weather the Storm" (1922), "A Warning" (1922), "When I'm Near You (1922), "Aladdin's Lamp" (1922), "When Love Will Not Die" (1922), "Wild Rose" (1922), "Will o the Wisp" (1922), "Rose of the Cabaret" (1923), "Under a Thousand Eyes" (1923), "When the Time to Say Goodnight Comes" (1924), "Old Fashioned Days" (1926), and "Somebody You'll Pass This Way Again" (1928). Her song "Paris" was in a musical comedy, Say When (1928), but cut before the show appeared on Broadway.

Hopper wrote and recited a poem at a 1919 event at the Plaza Hotel, to benefit the American Committee for Armenian and Syrian Relief. She performed her songs on radio programs in 1924. In 1925, she went to Paris as "envoy" of the Metropolitan Opera Company, to secure several noted singers for the opera's new season.

=== Sports ===
Hopper was a competitive golfer as a young woman, and was the United States women's champion in fencing in 1924. She represented the United States at two Summer Olympics events, in 1924 and 1928. She also won a tournament in 1926. "I believe that every woman, be she housekeeper, business woman or society leader, should have some form of exercise that she enjoys and engages in regularly," she said in a 1924 interview. "Exercise done to music is most valuable, since rhythm and concentration go hand in hand." She was still fencing competitively in Europe in 1931, but she did not qualify for the United States team for the 1932 Summer Olympics.

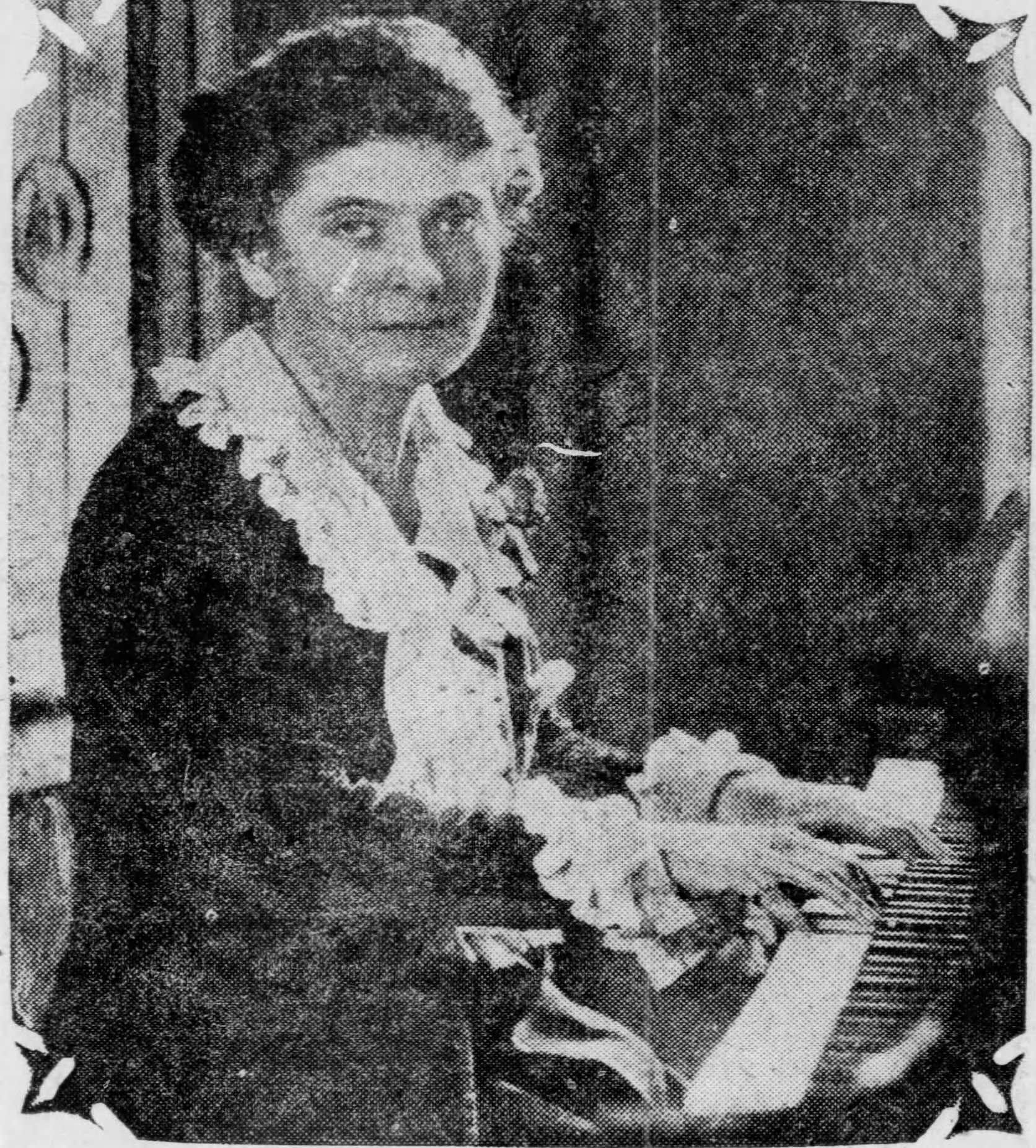
Hopper in 1924, with piano

== Legal issues ==
In 1920, Hopper and socialite Grace Carley Harriman testified in a lawsuit against Pierce-Arrow Renting Company after an acquaintance was struck by a car. In the 1920s she was the plaintiff in an Ohio lawsuit concerning her husband's estate. She was arrested and convicted of conspiracy in 1940, in a case involving Grace Carley Harriman and a fraudulent charity sweepstakes. She was sentenced to a year and a day in prison.

== Personal life ==
Prichard married an actor, Charles H. Hopper, in 1911; he died in 1916. She died in 1963, at the age of 72, in New York City.
