= Peggy Butler =

British fencer

Personal information
- Born: 23 September 1897 London, England
- Died: 15 December 1971 (aged 74)

Sport
- Sport: Fencing

Peggy Butler (23 September 1897 – 15 December 1971) was a British fencer. She competed at the 1928 and 1932 Summer Olympics.
