= Ivka Tavčar =

Yugoslav fencer

Personal information
- Born: 11 May 1909 Ljubljana, Austria-Hungary

Sport
- Sport: Fencing

Ivka Tavčar (born 11 May 1909, date of death unknown) was a Yugoslav fencer. She competed in the women's individual foil event at the 1936 Summer Olympics.
