= Jenny Addams =

Belgian fencer (1909–1990)

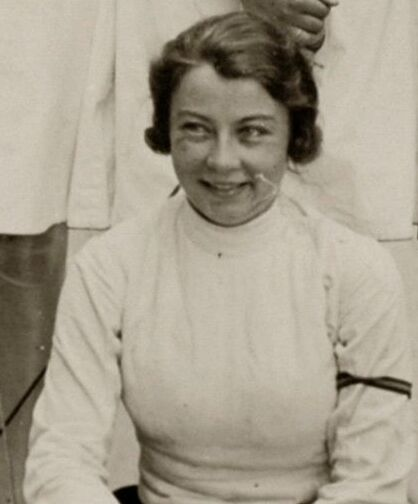
- Jenny Addams (1928)

Personal information
- Born: 15 February 1909 Brussels, Belgium
- Died: 10 January 1990 (aged 80) Wavre, Belgium

Sport
- Sport: Fencing

Jenny Marie Beatrice Addams (15 February 1909 – 10 January 1990) was a Belgian fencer. She competed at four Olympic Games. Addams died in Wavre on 10 January 1990, at the age of 80.
