= Johanna de Boer =

Dutch fencer (1901–1984)

Personal information
- Born: 6 January 1901 Amsterdam, Netherlands
- Died: 7 August 1984 (aged 83) Amsterdam, Netherlands

Sport
- Sport: Fencing

Johanna de Boer (6 January 1901 – 7 August 1984) was a Dutch fencer. She competed in the women's individual foil at three Olympic Games.
