= Marion Lloyd =

American fencer

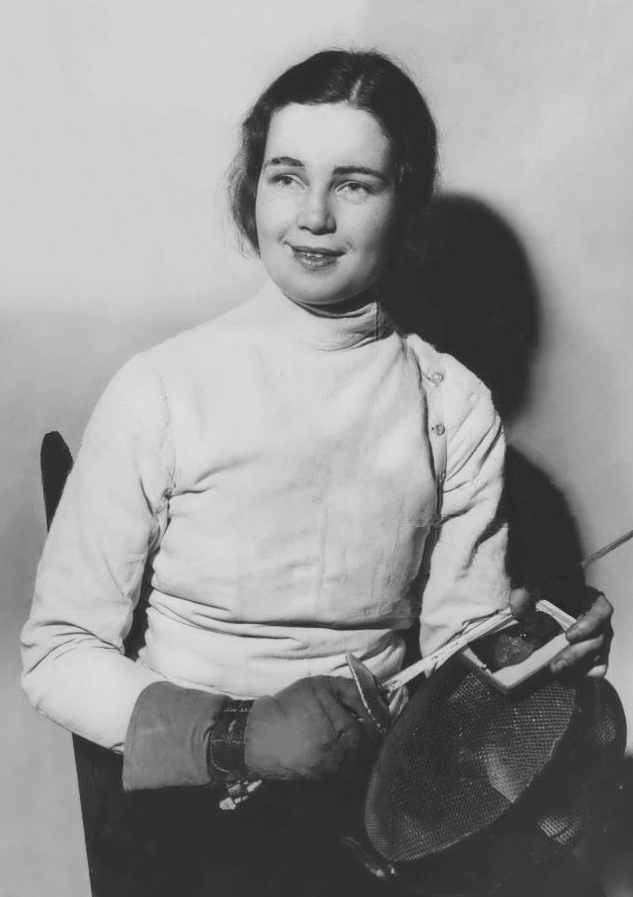
- Lloyd in 1931

Personal information
- Born: April 16, 1906 Brooklyn, United States
- Died: November 2, 1969 (aged 63) Beverly Hills, California, United States

Sport
- Sport: Fencing
- Event: Foil
- Club: Salle d' Armes Vince, Manhattan

Marion Lloyd (later Vince; April 16, 1906 – November 2, 1969) was an American foil fencer. She competed at the 1928, 1932, and 1936 Summer Olympics, placing eighth in 1932. Lloyd won the American junior title in 1926 and the senior AFLA title in 1928 and 1931. During her fencing career, she worked as a secretary at National City Corp.
