= Lucie Prost =

French fencer

Personal information
- Born: 2 April 1905
- Died: 28 June 1970 (aged 65)

Sport
- Sport: Fencing

Lucie Prost (2 April 1905 – 28 June 1970) was a French fencer. She competed in the individual women's foil competition at the 1924 and 1928 Summer Olympics.
