= Adriana Admiraal-Meijerink =

Dutch fencer (1893–1992)

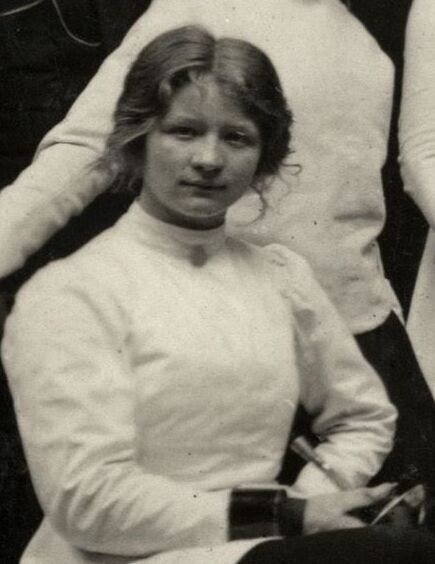
- Meijerink in 1914

Personal information
- Born: 13 June 1893 Haarlem, Netherlands
- Died: 5 May 1992 (aged 98) Heemskerk, Netherlands

Sport
- Sport: Fencing

Adriana Johanna Jacoba Admiraal-Meijerink (13 June 1893 – 5 May 1992) was a Dutch fencer. She competed in the women's individual foil at the 1924 and 1928 Summer Olympics.
