= Yutta Barding =

Danish fencer (1880–1976)

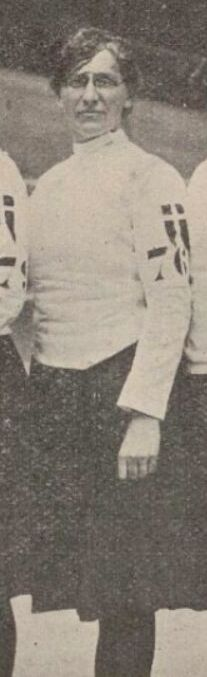

Personal information
- Nationality: Danish
- Born: 26 December 1880 Frederiksberg, Denmark
- Died: 12 March 1976 (aged 95) Gentofte, Denmark

Sport
- Sport: Fencing

Yutta Barding (26 December 1880 – 12 March 1976) was a Danish fencer. She competed in the women's foil competition at the 1924 Summer Olympics.

She is the mother of Ulla Barding-Poulsen, fellow Danish fencer.
