= Gladys Daniell =

British fencer

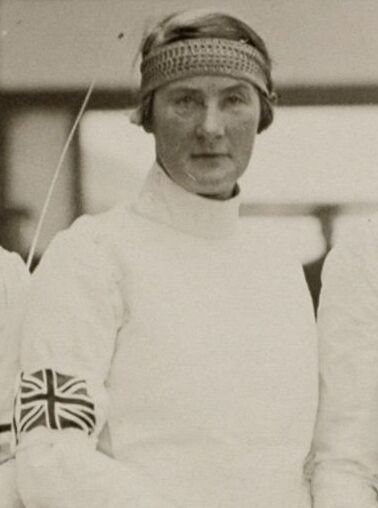

Personal information
- Born: 8 November 1884 Wandsworth, London, England
- Died: 26 July 1962 (aged 77) Bournemouth, England

Sport
- Sport: Fencing

Gladys Daniell (8 November 1884 – 26 July 1962) was a British fencer. She competed at the 1924 and 1928 Summer Olympics.

== Fencing career ==
Daniell was a member of the Ladies' London Fencing Club and a member of Queen Alexandra's House Gymnasium in London.

In 1911, Daniell won the Amateur Fencing Association's Ladies' Fencing Championship. In 1912, Daniell won the third International Championship of the Stockholm Ladies' Fencing Club. The same year, she competed again at the Ladies' Fencing Championship, defending her title after a tie with A. B. Walker and C. A. Walker. She was awarded a gold and platinum brooch as her prize.

Daniell entered the Ladies' Fencing Championship again in 1921, gaining her third title in the competition. She competed in the championship again in 1923.

=== Fencing style ===
Daniell was a left-handed fencer.
