= Gladys Davis (fencer) =

British fencer

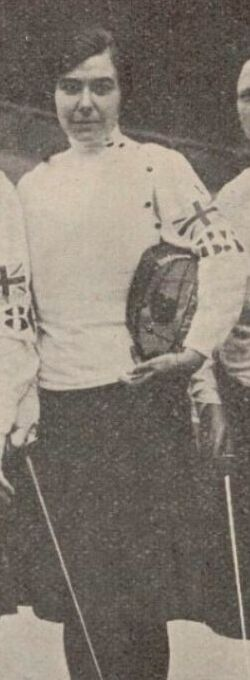

Personal information
- Born: 29 July 1893
- Died: 23 May 1965 (aged 71)

Sport
- Sport: Fencing
Medal record
Women's fencing
Representing United Kingdom
Olympic Games
Silver medal – second place	1924 Paris	Foil, individual

Gladys Davis (29 July 1893 – 23 May 1965) was a British fencer. She won a silver medal in the women's individual foil competition at the 1924 Summer Olympics.
