= Gizella Tary =

Hungarian fencer

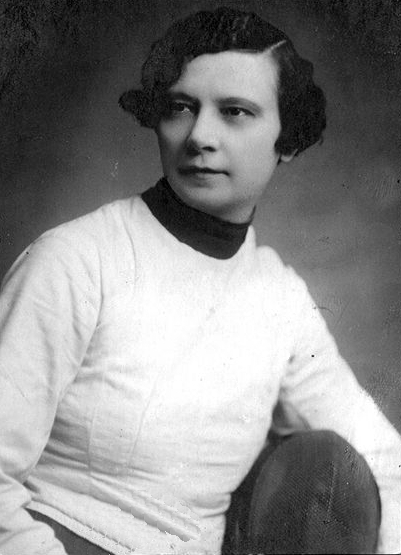
- Gizella Tary in 1924

Personal information
- Born: 19 November 1884 Szolnok, Hungary
- Died: 8 February 1960 (aged 75) Budapest, Hungary

Sport
- Sport: Fencing

Gizella Tary (19 November 1884 – 8 February 1960) was a Hungarian fencer. She competed in the women's individual foil at the 1924 and 1928 Summer Olympics. She was the first woman to represent Hungary at the Olympics.
