= Muriel Freeman =

English fencer (1897–1980)

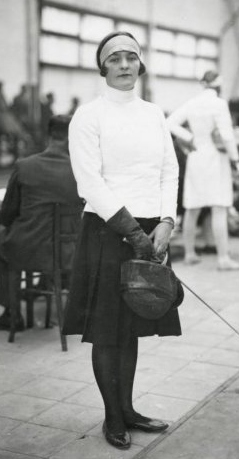
- Freeman at the 1928 Olympics

Personal information
- Born: 9 September 1897 Worcester, England
- Died: 1980 (aged 82–83) Northampton, England

Sport
- Sport: Fencing
- Event: Foil
Medal record
Representing United Kingdom
Olympic Games
Silver medal – second place	1928 Amsterdam	Foil, individual

Muriel Bolton Freeman (9 September 1897 – 1980) was an English foil fencer. She competed at the 1924 and 1928 Olympics and won a silver medal in 1928, placing fourth in 1924.
