= Fencing at the 1936 Summer Olympics – Men's team foil =

Men's team foil at the Games of the XI Olympiad
- Venue: Imperial Sports Field, Berlin
- Dates: 2–4 August 1936
- Competitors: 99 from 17 nations

Medalists
1st place, gold medalist(s)		Manlio Di Rosa; Giulio Gaudini; Gioacchino Guaragna; Gustavo Marzi; Giorgio Bocchino; Ciro Verratti	Italy
2nd place, silver medalist(s)		André Gardère; Edward Gardère; René Lemoine; René Bondoux; Jacques Coutrot; René Bougnol	France
3rd place, bronze medalist(s)		Siegfried Lerdon; August Heim; Julius Eisenecker; Erwin Casmir; Stefan Rosenbauer; Otto Adam	Germany

The men's team foil was one of seven fencing events on the fencing at the 1936 Summer Olympics programme. It was the sixth appearance of the event. The competition was held from 2 to 4 August 1936. 99 fencers from 17 nations competed. Each team could have a maximum of six fencers, with four participating in any given match.

The competition format continued the pool play round-robin from prior years. Each of the four fencers from one team would face each of the four from the other, for a total of 16 bouts per match. The team that won more bouts won the match, with competition potentially stopping when one team reached 9 points out of the possible 16 (this did not always occur and matches sometimes continued). If the bouts were 8–8, touches received was used to determine the winning team. Pool matches unnecessary to the result were not played; this rule affected all 10 of the pools in the first two rounds, which stopped after 2 of 3 possible matches when one team lost both.

== Rosters ==
Argentina

- Roberto Larraz
- Héctor Lucchetti
- Ángel Gorordo
- Luis Lucchetti
- Rodolfo Valenzuela
- Manuel Torrente

Austria

- Hans Lion
- Roman Fischer
- Hans Schönbaumsfeld
- Ernst Baylon
- Josef Losert
- Karl Sudrich

Belgium

- Georges de Bourguignon
- André Van De Werve De Vorsselaer
- Henri Paternóster
- Raymond Bru
- Jean Heeremans
- Paul Valcke

Brazil

- Moacyr Dunham
- Ennio de Oliveira
- Ricardo Vagnotti
- Lodovico Alessandri

Canada

- Bertrand Boissonnault
- Don Collinge
- George Tully
- Charles Otis
- Ernest Dalton

Czechoslovakia

- Hervarth Frass von Friedenfeldt
- František Vohryzek
- Jiří Jesenský
- Bohuslav Kirchmann
- Josef Hildebrand

Denmark

- Erik Hammer Sørensen
- Kim Bærentzen
- Aage Leidersdorff
- Caspar Schrøder
- Svend Jacobsen

Egypt

- Mahmoud Abdin
- Mauris Shamil
- Hassan Hosni Tawfik
- Anwar Tawfik

France

- André Gardère
- Edward Gardère
- René Lemoine
- René Bondoux
- Jacques Coutrot
- René Bougnol

Germany

- Siegfried Lerdon
- August Heim
- Julius Eisenecker
- Erwin Casmir
- Stefan Rosenbauer
- Otto Adam

Great Britain

- Denis Pearce
- David Bartlett
- Emrys Lloyd
- Geoffrey Hett
- Christopher Hammersley
- Roger Tredgold

Greece

- Konstantinos Botasis
- Spyridon Ferentinos
- Konstantinos Bembis
- Nikolaos Manolesos
- Menelaos Psarrakis

Hungary

- József Hátszeghy
- Lajos Maszlay
- Aladár Gerevich
- Béla Bay
- Ottó Hátszeghy
- Antal Zirczy

Italy

- Manlio Di Rosa
- Giulio Gaudini
- Gioacchino Guaragna
- Gustavo Marzi
- Giorgio Bocchino
- Ciro Verratti

Norway

- Nils Jørgensen
- Jens Frølich
- Johan Falkenberg
- Thorstein Guthe

Switzerland

- Michel Fauconnet
- Édouard Fitting
- Jean Rubli
- Gottfried von Meiss
- Constantin Antoniades

United States

- Joe Levis
- Hugh Alessandroni
- John Potter
- John Hurd
- Warren Dow
- Bill Pecora

Yugoslavia

- Branko Tretinjak
- Edo Marion
- Mirko Koršič
- Marjan Pengov
- Aleksandar Nikolić
- Ivan Vladimir Mažuranić

== Results ==
=== Round 1 ===
The top two teams in each pool advanced to round 2.

==== Pool 1 ====
Switzerland defeated Greece on touches received (64–68) after the bouts were tied at 8 apiece. Belgium also defeated Greece. This resulted in Greece's elimination and the match between Belgium and Switzerland not being played.

Rank	Country	Points	MW	ML	BW	BL	Notes
1	Belgium	2	1	0	9	2	Q
2	Switzerland	2	1	0	8	8	Q
3	Greece	0	0	2	10	17	

==== Pool 2 ====
France and Yugoslavia each defeated Brazil. This resulted in Brazil being eliminated and the match between France and Yugoslavia not being played.

Rank	Country	Points	MW	ML	BW	BL	Notes
1	France	2	1	0	16	0	Q
2	Yugoslavia	2	1	0	9	7	Q
3	Brazil	0	0	2	7	25	

==== Pool 3 ====
Argentina and Czechoslavkia each defeated Denmark. This resulted in Denmark being eliminated and the match between Argentina and Czechoslavkia not being played.

Rank	Country	Points	MW	ML	BW	BL	Notes
1	Argentina	2	1	0	14	2	Q
2	Czechoslovakia	2	1	0	13	3	Q
3	Denmark	0	0	2	5	27	

==== Pool 4 ====
Germany and Great Britain each defeated Canada. This resulted in Canada being eliminated and the match between Germany and Great Britain not being played.

Rank	Country	Points	MW	ML	BW	BL	Notes
1	Germany	2	1	0	15	1	Q
2	Great Britain	2	1	0	14	2	Q
3	Canada	0	0	2	3	29	

==== Pool 5 ====
Italy and Austria each defeated Egypt. This resulted in Egypt being eliminated and the match between Italy and Austria not being played.

Rank	Country	Points	MW	ML	BW	BL	Notes
1	Italy	2	1	0	13	1	Q
2	Austria	2	1	0	11	5	Q
3	Egypt	0	0	2	6	24	

==== Pool 6 ====
The United States and Hungary each defeated Norway. This resulted in Norway being eliminated and the match between the United States and Hungary not being played.

Rank	Country	Points	MW	ML	BW	BL	Notes
1	United States	2	1	0	12	4	Q
2	Hungary	2	1	0	10	6	Q
3	Norway	0	0	2	10	22	

=== Round 2 ===
The top two teams in each pool advanced to the semifinals.

==== Pool 1 ====
Germany and Great Britain advanced from the same first-round group, but had not played each other yet. Great Britain was defeated after losing to both Argentina and Germany, who did not play each other. The match between Argentina and Great Britain was decided on touches received, 57–62, after being tied on individual bouts 8–8.

Rank	Country	Points	MW	ML	BW	BL	Notes
1	Germany	2	1	0	9	2	Q
2	Argentina	2	1	0	8	8	Q
3	Great Britain	0	0	2	10	17	

==== Pool 2 ====
Italy and the United States each defeated Switzerland. This resulted in Switzerland being eliminated and the match between Italy and the United States not being played.

Rank	Country	Points	MW	ML	BW	BL	Notes
1	Italy	2	1	0	15	1	Q
2	United States	2	1	0	13	3	Q
3	Switzerland	0	0	2	4	28	

==== Pool 3 ====
France and Hungary each defeated Yugoslavia. This resulted in Yugoslavia being eliminated and the match between France and Hungary not being played.

Rank	Country	Points	MW	ML	BW	BL	Notes
1	France	2	1	0	9	1	Q
2	Hungary	2	1	0	14	2	Q
3	Yugoslavia	0	0	2	3	23	

==== Pool 4 ====
Austria and Belgium each defeated Czechoslovakia. This resulted in Czechoslovakia being eliminated and the match between Austria and Belgium not being played.

Rank	Country	Points	MW	ML	BW	BL	Notes
1	Austria	2	1	0	12	4	Q
2	Belgium	2	1	0	11	5	Q
3	Czechoslovakia	0	0	2	9	23	

=== Semifinals ===
The top two teams in each pool advanced to the final.

==== Semifinal 1 ====
Italy and the United States advanced from the same second-round group, but had not played each other yet. Italy defeated each of the three other teams. Austria had a decisive 12–4 win against the United States, but fell to Hungary on touches received 53–63 after the individual bouts were 8–8. Hungary in turn lost to the United States, 9–7, creating a three-way tie for second place. Austria had lost the fewest individual bouts and advanced.

Rank	Country	Points	MW	ML	BW	BL	Notes
1	Italy	6	3	0	25	10	Q
2	Austria	2	1	2	24	24	Q
3	Hungary	2	1	2	18	30	
4	United States	2	1	2	16	32	

==== Semifinal 2 ====
Germany and Argentina advanced from the same second-round group, but had not played each other yet. France remained undefeated, beating each of the other three teams. Germany defeated Belgium and Argentina to advance as well, with Belgium finishing third in the group with a win over Argentina.

Rank	Country	Points	MW	ML	BW	BL	Notes
1	France	6	3	0	29	19	Q
2	Germany	4	2	1	28	20	Q
3	Belgium	2	1	2	25	23	
4	Argentina	0	0	3	14	34	

=== Final ===
In the first pairings, Italy beat Austria while France defeated Germany. In the second, France defeated Austria while Italy beat Germany. The third and final pairings of the round-robin became effectively a gold-medal final between Italy and France (both of whom were undefeated to that point) as well as a bronze-medal match featuring Germany and Austria. Italy reached 9 wins after 13 individual bouts, securing the gold medal while France took silver. Germany accumulated 9 wins in 14 bouts, earning bronze.

Rank	Country	Points	MW	ML	BW	BL
1st place, gold medalist(s)	Italy	6	3	0	38	8
2nd place, silver medalist(s)	France	6	3	0	29	19
3rd place, bronze medalist(s)	Germany	4	2	1	28	20
4	Austria	2	1	2	24	24
