= Fencing at the 1936 Summer Olympics – Men's foil =

Olympic fencing tournament

Men's foil at the Games of the XI Olympiad
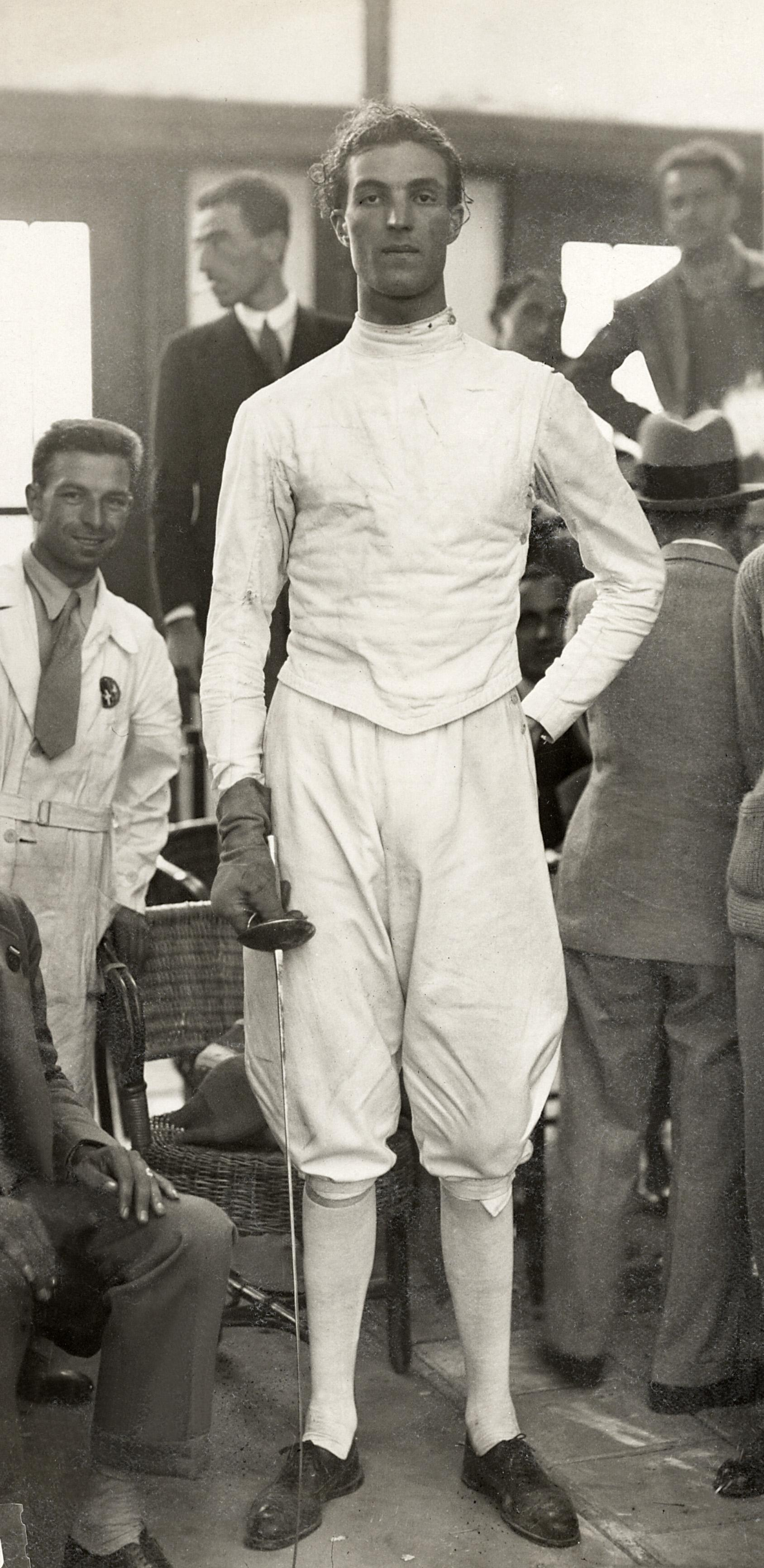
- Giulio Gaudini (1928)
- Venue: Imperial Sports Field, Berlin
- Dates: 5–6 August 1936
- Competitors: 62 from 22 nations

Medalists
| 1st place, gold medalist(s) | | Giulio Gaudini | Italy |
| 2nd place, silver medalist(s) | | Edward Gardère | France |
| 3rd place, bronze medalist(s) | | Giorgio Bocchino | Italy |

The men's foil was one of seven fencing events on the fencing at the 1936 Summer Olympics programme. It was the ninth appearance of the event. The competition was held from 5 August 1936 to 6 August 1936. 62 fencers from 22 nations competed. Nations were limited to three fencers. The event was won by Giulio Gaudini of Italy, the nation's second consecutive and fourth overall victory in the men's foil (matching France for most all-time). Gaudini, who had won bronze medals in 1928 and 1932, was the first man to win three medals in the event. His countryman Giorgio Bocchino took bronze. Edward Gardère put France back on the podium after a one-Games absence.

== Background ==
This was the ninth appearance of the event, which has been held at every Summer Olympics except 1908 (when there was a foil display only rather than a medal event). Seven of the ten 1932 finalists returned: silver medalist (and 1928 finalist) Joe Levis of the United States, two-time bronze medalist Giulio Gaudini and fourth-place finisher Gioacchino Guaragna of Italy, fifth-place finisher Erwin Casmir of Germany, sixth-place finisher Emrys Lloyd of Great Britain, and seventh-place finisher Roberto Larraz and tenth-place finisher Ángel Gorordo of Argentina. Gaudini, the 2.00 metres tall Italian, was one of the best fencers of the 1920s and 1930s and was one of the favorites in Berlin. His main competition were his fellow Italians and the French team, particularly European champion André Gardère and his brother Edward Gardère.

Brazil and Bulgaria each made their debut in the men's foil. The United States made its eighth appearance, most of any nation, having missed only the inaugural 1896 competition.

== Competition format ==
The event used a five-round format. In each round, the fencers were divided into pools to play a round-robin within the pool. Bouts were to five touches. Not all bouts were played in some pools if not necessary to determine advancement. Two points were awarded for each bout won. Ties were broken through fence-off bouts in early rounds if necessary for determining advancement, but by touches received in final rounds (and for non-advancement-necessary placement in earlier rounds). Standard foil rules were used, including that touches had to be made with the tip of the foil, the target area was limited to the torso, and priority determined the winner of double touches.

- Round 1: There were 9 pools of 6–8 fencers each. The top 4 fencers in each pool advanced to round 2.
- Round 2: There were 6 pools of 6 fencers each. The top 4 fencers in each pool advanced to the quarterfinals.
- Quarterfinals: There were 4 pools of 6 fencers each. The top 4 fencers in each quarterfinal advanced to the semifinals.
- Semifinals: There were 2 pools of 8 fencers each. The top 4 fencers in each semifinal advanced to the final.
- Final: The final pool had 8 fencers.

== Schedule ==
| Date | Time | Round |
|---|---|---|
| Wednesday, 5 August 1936 | 9:00; 17:50; 21:00 | Round 1 Round 2 Quarterfinals |
| Thursday, 6 August 1936 | 9:00; 15:00 | Semifinals; Final |

== Results ==
=== Round 1 ===
The top 4 finishers in each pool advanced to round 2.

==== Pool 1 ====
| Rank | Fencer | Nation | Points | Wins | Losses | TS | TR | Notes |
|---|---|---|---|---|---|---|---|---|
| 1 | Giulio Gaudini | Italy | 10 | 5 | 1 | 29 | 12 | Q |
| 2 | Bengt Ljungquist | Sweden | 8 | 4 | 2 | 26 | 14 | Q |
| 3 | Paul Valcke | Belgium | 8 | 4 | 2 | 26 | 20 | Q |
| 4 | Bohuslav Kirchmann | Czechoslovakia | 8 | 4 | 2 | 24 | 22 | Q |
| 5 | Ángel Gorordo | Argentina | 6 | 3 | 3 | 20 | 18 | |
| 6 | César Barros | Chile | 2 | 1 | 5 | 7 | 29 | |
| 7 | Spyridon Ferentinos | Greece | 0 | 0 | 6 | 13 | 30 | |

==== Pool 2 ====
| Rank | Fencer | Nation | Points | Wins | Losses | TS | TR | Notes |
|---|---|---|---|---|---|---|---|---|
| 1 | André Gardère | France | 10 | 5 | 0 | 25 | 8 | Q |
| 2 | Roberto Larraz | Argentina | 8 | 4 | 1 | 24 | 13 | Q |
| 3 | Konstantinos Bembis | Greece | 6 | 3 | 2 | 20 | 15 | Q |
| 4 | Gottfried von Meiss | Switzerland | 4 | 2 | 3 | 17 | 19 | Q |
| 5 | Ricardo Vagnotti | Brazil | 2 | 1 | 4 | 10 | 22 | |
| 6 | Mirko Koršič | Yugoslavia | 0 | 0 | 5 | 7 | 25 | |

==== Pool 3 ====
Pecora defeated Pearce in a play-off for the fourth qualification spot.

| Rank | Fencer | Nation | Points | Wins | Losses | TS | TR | Notes |
|---|---|---|---|---|---|---|---|---|
| 1 | Erwin Casmir | Germany | 12 | 6 | 0 | 30 | 10 | Q |
| 2 | Lajos Maszlay | Hungary | 10 | 5 | 1 | 27 | 16 | Q |
| 3 | Aage Leidersdorff | Denmark | 10 | 5 | 2 | 30 | 26 | Q |
| 4 | Bill Pecora | United States | 8 | 4 | 3 | 25 | 24 | Q |
| 5 | Denis Pearce | Great Britain | 8 | 4 | 3 | 26 | 25 | |
| 6 | Hervarth Frass von Friedenfeldt | Czechoslovakia | 4 | 2 | 5 | 21 | 28 | |
| 7 | Mauris Shamil | Egypt | 2 | 1 | 6 | 21 | 32 | |
| 8 | Hubert de Bèsche | Sweden | 0 | 0 | 7 | 16 | 35 | |

==== Pool 4 ====
The three-way tie for third was determined by play-off, with Goyoaga coming last against Tingdahl and Jesenský resulting in the latter two fencers advancing.

| Rank | Fencer | Nation | Points | Wins | Losses | TS | TR | Notes |
|---|---|---|---|---|---|---|---|---|
| 1 | Emrys Lloyd | Great Britain | 10 | 5 | 0 | 25 | 7 | Q |
| 2 | Josef Losert | Austria | 8 | 4 | 1 | 22 | 15 | Q |
| 3 | Ivar Tingdahl | Sweden | 4 | 2 | 3 | 18 | 19 | Q |
| 4 | Jiří Jesenský | Czechoslovakia | 4 | 2 | 3 | 16 | 22 | Q |
| 5 | Tomás Goyoaga | Chile | 4 | 2 | 3 | 17 | 18 | |
| 6 | Marjan Pengov | Yugoslavia | 0 | 0 | 5 | 8 | 25 | |

==== Pool 5 ====
| Rank | Fencer | Nation | Points | Wins | Losses | TS | TR | Notes |
|---|---|---|---|---|---|---|---|---|
| 1 | József Hátszeghy | Hungary | 10 | 5 | 0 | 25 | 10 | Q |
| 2 | René Lemoine | France | 8 | 4 | 1 | 23 | 14 | Q |
| 3 | August Heim | Germany | 6 | 3 | 1 | 19 | 8 | Q |
| 4 | Johan Falkenberg | Norway | 6 | 3 | 1 | 18 | 10 | Q |
| 5 | Svend Jacobsen | Denmark | 2 | 1 | 4 | 11 | 21 | |
| 6 | Jean Rubli | Switzerland | 0 | 0 | 4 | 8 | 20 | |
| 7 | Hermogenes Valdebenito | Chile | 0 | 0 | 5 | 4 | 25 | |

==== Pool 6 ====
The three-way tie for third was determined by play-off, with Valenzuela coming last against Bay and Frølich resulting in the latter two fencers advancing.

| Rank | Fencer | Nation | Points | Wins | Losses | TS | TR | Notes |
|---|---|---|---|---|---|---|---|---|
| 1 | Joe Levis | United States | 12 | 6 | 0 | 30 | 13 | Q |
| 2 | Mahmoud Abdin | Egypt | 10 | 5 | 1 | 26 | 20 | Q |
| 3 | Béla Bay | Hungary | 6 | 3 | 3 | 25 | 20 | Q |
| 4 | Jens Frølich | Norway | 6 | 3 | 3 | 26 | 23 | Q |
| 5 | Rodolfo Valenzuela | Argentina | 6 | 3 | 3 | 23 | 22 | |
| 6 | Lodovico Alessandri | Brazil | 2 | 1 | 5 | 18 | 29 | |
| 7 | Ernest Dalton | Canada | 0 | 0 | 6 | 9 | 30 | |

==== Pool 7 ====
| Rank | Fencer | Nation | Points | Wins | Losses | TS | TR | Notes |
|---|---|---|---|---|---|---|---|---|
| 1 | Georges de Bourguignon | Belgium | 10 | 5 | 0 | 25 | 15 | Q |
| 2 | Giorgio Bocchino | Italy | 8 | 4 | 0 | 20 | 9 | Q |
| 3 | Michel Fauconnet | Switzerland | 6 | 3 | 1 | 19 | 10 | Q |
| 4 | Josef Ritz | Austria | 6 | 3 | 3 | 21 | 24 | Q |
| 5 | Caspar Schrøder | Denmark | 4 | 2 | 4 | 19 | 26 | |
| 6 | Moacyr Dunham | Brazil | 0 | 0 | 4 | 10 | 20 | |
| 7 | Nils Jørgensen | Norway | 0 | 0 | 5 | 15 | 25 | |

==== Pool 8 ====
Alessandroni defeated Bartlett in a tie-breaker play-off.

| Rank | Fencer | Nation | Points | Wins | Losses | TS | TR | Notes |
|---|---|---|---|---|---|---|---|---|
| 1 | Edward Gardère | France | 10 | 5 | 1 | 28 | 14 | Q |
| 2 | Julius Eisenecker | Germany | 8 | 4 | 2 | 28 | 17 | Q |
| 3 | Karl Sudrich | Austria | 8 | 4 | 1 | 22 | 16 | Q |
| 4 | Hugh Alessandroni | United States | 6 | 3 | 3 | 23 | 25 | Q |
| 5 | David Bartlett | Great Britain | 6 | 3 | 3 | 22 | 23 | |
| 6 | Dimitar Vasilev | Bulgaria | 2 | 1 | 5 | 6 | 26 | |
| 7 | Don Collinge | Canada | 0 | 0 | 5 | 12 | 25 | |

==== Pool 9 ====
| Rank | Fencer | Nation | Points | Wins | Losses | TS | TR | Notes |
|---|---|---|---|---|---|---|---|---|
| 1 | Gioacchino Guaragna | Italy | 10 | 5 | 0 | 25 | 7 | Q |
| 2 | Nikolaos Manolesos | Greece | 8 | 4 | 1 | 21 | 17 | Q |
| 3 | Raymond Bru | Belgium | 6 | 3 | 2 | 21 | 16 | Q |
| 4 | Edo Marion | Yugoslavia | 6 | 3 | 2 | 18 | 19 | Q |
| 5 | Charles Otis | Canada | 2 | 1 | 4 | 13 | 24 | |
| 5 | Paul Kunze | Netherlands | 2 | 1 | 4 | 9 | 24 | |
| 7 | Anwar Tawfik | Egypt | 2 | 1 | 5 | 20 | 28 | |

=== Round 2 ===
The top 4 finishers in each pool advanced to round 3.

==== Pool 1 ====
| Rank | Fencer | Nation | Points | Wins | Losses | TS | TR | Notes |
|---|---|---|---|---|---|---|---|---|
| 1 | Joe Levis | United States | 8 | 4 | 1 | 24 | 16 | Q |
| 2 | Paul Valcke | Belgium | 8 | 4 | 1 | 24 | 18 | Q |
| 3 | Julius Eisenecker | Germany | 4 | 2 | 3 | 19 | 19 | Q |
| 4 | Giorgio Bocchino | Italy | 4 | 2 | 3 | 16 | 22 | Q |
| 5 | Michel Fauconnet | Switzerland | 4 | 2 | 3 | 17 | 20 | |
| 6 | Karl Sudrich | Austria | 2 | 1 | 4 | 17 | 22 | |

==== Pool 2 ====
| Rank | Fencer | Nation | Points | Wins | Losses | TS | TR | Notes |
|---|---|---|---|---|---|---|---|---|
| 1 | Giulio Gaudini | Italy | 6 | 3 | 1 | 19 | 9 | Q |
| 2 | József Hátszeghy | Hungary | 6 | 3 | 1 | 16 | 12 | Q |
| 3 | Josef Losert | Austria | 6 | 3 | 1 | 17 | 17 | Q |
| 4 | Johan Falkenberg | Norway | 4 | 2 | 1 | 12 | 10 | Q |
| 5 | Ivar Tingdahl | Sweden | 2 | 1 | 4 | 15 | 24 | |
| 6 | Gottfried von Meiss | Switzerland | 0 | 0 | 4 | 13 | 20 | |

==== Pool 3 ====
| Rank | Fencer | Nation | Points | Wins | Losses | TS | TR | Notes |
|---|---|---|---|---|---|---|---|---|
| 1 | Edward Gardère | France | 8 | 4 | 0 | 20 | 8 | Q |
| 2 | Lajos Maszlay | Hungary | 6 | 3 | 1 | 18 | 11 | Q |
| 3 | Georges de Bourguignon | Belgium | 6 | 3 | 1 | 19 | 13 | Q |
| 4 | Jiří Jesenský | Czechoslovakia | 4 | 2 | 3 | 15 | 21 | Q |
| 5 | August Heim | Germany | 2 | 1 | 4 | 17 | 23 | |
| 6 | Josef Ritz | Austria | 0 | 0 | 4 | 7 | 20 | |

==== Pool 4 ====
It is unclear why Marion did not face at least one of Bembis and Lloyd; two additional wins would have placed Marion even with Leidersdorff and Abdin in points (though they each had additional bouts that could have earned them more, if necessary).

| Rank | Fencer | Nation | Points | Wins | Losses | TS | TR | Notes |
|---|---|---|---|---|---|---|---|---|
| 1 | Emrys Lloyd | Great Britain | 6 | 3 | 0 | 15 | 6 | Q |
| 2 | Roberto Larraz | Argentina | 6 | 3 | 1 | 18 | 11 | Q |
| 3 | Aage Leidersdorff | Denmark | 4 | 2 | 1 | 11 | 9 | Q |
| 4 | Mahmoud Abdin | Egypt | 4 | 2 | 1 | 11 | 10 | Q |
| 5 | Edo Marion | Yugoslavia | 0 | 0 | 3 | 4 | 15 | |
| 6 | Konstantinos Bembis | Greece | 0 | 0 | 4 | 10 | 20 | |

==== Pool 5 ====
| Rank | Fencer | Nation | Points | Wins | Losses | TS | TR | Notes |
|---|---|---|---|---|---|---|---|---|
| 1 | André Gardère | France | 8 | 4 | 1 | 24 | 13 | Q |
| 2 | Raymond Bru | Belgium | 6 | 3 | 1 | 18 | 12 | Q |
| 3 | Gioacchino Guaragna | Italy | 6 | 3 | 1 | 17 | 12 | Q |
| 4 | Jens Frølich | Norway | 4 | 2 | 3 | 16 | 23 | Q |
| 5 | Hugh Alessandroni | United States | 2 | 1 | 4 | 17 | 22 | |
| 5 | Nikolaos Manolesos | Greece | 2 | 1 | 4 | 12 | 22 | |

==== Pool 6 ====
Ljungquist defeated Pecora in a tie-breaker play-off.

| Rank | Fencer | Nation | Points | Wins | Losses | TS | TR | Notes |
|---|---|---|---|---|---|---|---|---|
| 1 | Erwin Casmir | Germany | 10 | 5 | 0 | 25 | 14 | Q |
| 2 | Béla Bay | Hungary | 6 | 3 | 2 | 18 | 13 | Q |
| 3 | René Lemoine | France | 8 | 3 | 2 | 20 | 21 | Q |
| 4 | Bengt Ljungquist | Sweden | 4 | 2 | 3 | 18 | 19 | Q |
| 5 | William Thomas Pecora | United States | 4 | 2 | 3 | 16 | 20 | |
| 6 | Bohuslav Kirchmann | Czechoslovakia | 0 | 0 | 5 | 15 | 25 | |

=== Quarterfinals ===
The top 4 finishers in each pool advanced to the semifinals.

==== Quarterfinal 1 ====
| Rank | Fencer | Nation | Points | Wins | Losses | TS | TR | Notes |
|---|---|---|---|---|---|---|---|---|
| 1 | Giulio Gaudini | Italy | 8 | 4 | 0 | 20 | 5 | Q |
| 2 | André Gardère | France | 6 | 3 | 1 | 17 | 12 | Q |
| 2 | Julius Eisenecker | Germany | 6 | 3 | 1 | 15 | 12 | Q |
| 4 | Béla Bay | Hungary | 4 | 2 | 2 | 13 | 17 | Q |
| 5 | Johan Falkenberg | Norway | 0 | 0 | 4 | 6 | 20 | |
| 5 | Roberto Larraz | Argentina | 0 | 0 | 4 | 15 | 20 | |

==== Quarterfinal 2 ====
The three-way tie for third was determined by play-off, with Maszlay coming last against Bru and Losert resulting in the latter two fencers advancing.

| Rank | Fencer | Nation | Points | Wins | Losses | TS | TR | Notes |
|---|---|---|---|---|---|---|---|---|
| 1 | Joe Levis | United States | 10 | 5 | 0 | 25 | 16 | Q |
| 2 | Edward Gardère | France | 6 | 3 | 1 | 18 | 9 | Q |
| 3 | Raymond Bru | Belgium | 4 | 2 | 3 | 21 | 22 | Q |
| 4 | Josef Losert | Austria | 4 | 2 | 3 | 17 | 18 | Q |
| 5 | Lajos Maszlay | Hungary | 4 | 2 | 3 | 17 | 20 | |
| 6 | Bengt Ljungquist | Sweden | 0 | 0 | 4 | 7 | 20 | |

==== Quarterfinal 3 ====
| Rank | Fencer | Nation | Points | Wins | Losses | TS | TR | Notes |
|---|---|---|---|---|---|---|---|---|
| 1 | Erwin Casmir | Germany | 8 | 4 | 1 | 23 | 13 | Q |
| 2 | Gioacchino Guaragna | Italy | 6 | 3 | 1 | 18 | 10 | Q |
| 3 | József Hátszeghy | Hungary | 6 | 3 | 2 | 20 | 19 | Q |
| 4 | Georges de Bourguignon | Belgium | 4 | 2 | 2 | 18 | 15 | Q |
| 5 | Jens Frølich | Norway | 2 | 1 | 4 | 15 | 24 | |
| 5 | Jiří Jesenský | Czechoslovakia | 2 | 1 | 4 | 11 | 24 | |

==== Quarterfinal 4 ====
| Rank | Fencer | Nation | Points | Wins | Losses | TS | TR | Notes |
|---|---|---|---|---|---|---|---|---|
| 1 | Giorgio Bocchino | Italy | 6 | 3 | 1 | 17 | 11 | Q |
| 2 | René Lemoine | France | 6 | 3 | 1 | 17 | 12 | Q |
| 3 | Paul Valcke | Belgium | 6 | 3 | 1 | 16 | 13 | Q |
| 4 | Emrys Lloyd | Great Britain | 6 | 3 | 2 | 19 | 14 | Q |
| 5 | Mahmoud Abdin | Egypt | 2 | 1 | 4 | 17 | 22 | |
| 6 | Aage Leidersdorff | Denmark | 0 | 0 | 4 | 6 | 20 | |

=== Semifinals ===
The top 4 finishers in each pool advanced to the final.

==== Semifinal 1 ====
| Rank | Fencer | Nation | Points | Wins | Losses | TS | TR | Notes |
|---|---|---|---|---|---|---|---|---|
| 1 | Giulio Gaudini | Italy | 12 | 6 | 1 | 34 | 20 | Q |
| 2 | Giorgio Bocchino | Italy | 10 | 5 | 1 | 28 | 18 | Q |
| 3 | André Gardère | France | 8 | 4 | 2 | 26 | 19 | Q |
| 4 | Raymond Bru | Belgium | 8 | 4 | 3 | 25 | 26 | Q |
| 5 | Emrys Lloyd | Great Britain | 6 | 3 | 4 | 28 | 24 | |
| 6 | Paul Valcke | Belgium | 4 | 2 | 5 | 19 | 28 | |
| 7 | József Hátszeghy | Hungary | 4 | 2 | 5 | 20 | 31 | |
| 8 | Julius Eisenecker | Germany | 2 | 1 | 6 | 20 | 34 | |

==== Semifinal 2 ====
The three-way tie for third was determined by play-off, with Maszlay coming last against Bru and Losert resulting in the latter two fencers advancing.

| Rank | Fencer | Nation | Points | Wins | Losses | TS | TR | Notes |
|---|---|---|---|---|---|---|---|---|
| 1 | Gioacchino Guaragna | Italy | 12 | 6 | 0 | 30 | 12 | Q |
| 2 | Erwin Casmir | Germany | 10 | 5 | 1 | 28 | 18 | Q |
| 3 | Edward Gardère | France | 10 | 5 | 1 | 29 | 21 | Q |
| 4 | Georges de Bourguignon | Belgium | 8 | 4 | 3 | 28 | 29 | Q |
| 5 | Béla Bay | Hungary | 6 | 3 | 4 | 27 | 28 | |
| 6 | René Lemoine | France | 4 | 2 | 5 | 19 | 32 | |
| 7 | Joe Levis | United States | 2 | 1 | 5 | 19 | 25 | |
| 8 | Josef Losert | Austria | 0 | 0 | 6 | 15 | 30 | |

=== Final ===
In the final pool, ties—including the tie for the bronze medal—were broken by touches received rather than by play-offs as in previous rounds.

| Rank | Fencer | Nation | Points | Wins | Losses | TS | TR |
|---|---|---|---|---|---|---|---|
| 1st place, gold medalist(s) | Giulio Gaudini | Italy | 14 | 7 | 0 | 35 | 20 |
| 2nd place, silver medalist(s) | Edward Gardère | France | 12 | 6 | 1 | 33 | 25 |
| 3rd place, bronze medalist(s) | Giorgio Bocchino | Italy | 8 | 4 | 3 | 28 | 22 |
| 4 | Erwin Casmir | Germany | 8 | 4 | 3 | 31 | 29 |
| 5 | Gioacchino Guaragna | Italy | 6 | 3 | 4 | 30 | 28 |
| 6 | Raymond Bru | Belgium | 6 | 3 | 4 | 25 | 31 |
| 7 | André Gardère | France | 2 | 1 | 6 | 23 | 32 |
| 8 | Georges de Bourguignon | Belgium | 0 | 0 | 7 | 17 | 35 |
