= Fencing at the 1932 Summer Olympics – Men's foil =

Fencing at the Olympics

Men's foil at the Games of the X Olympiad
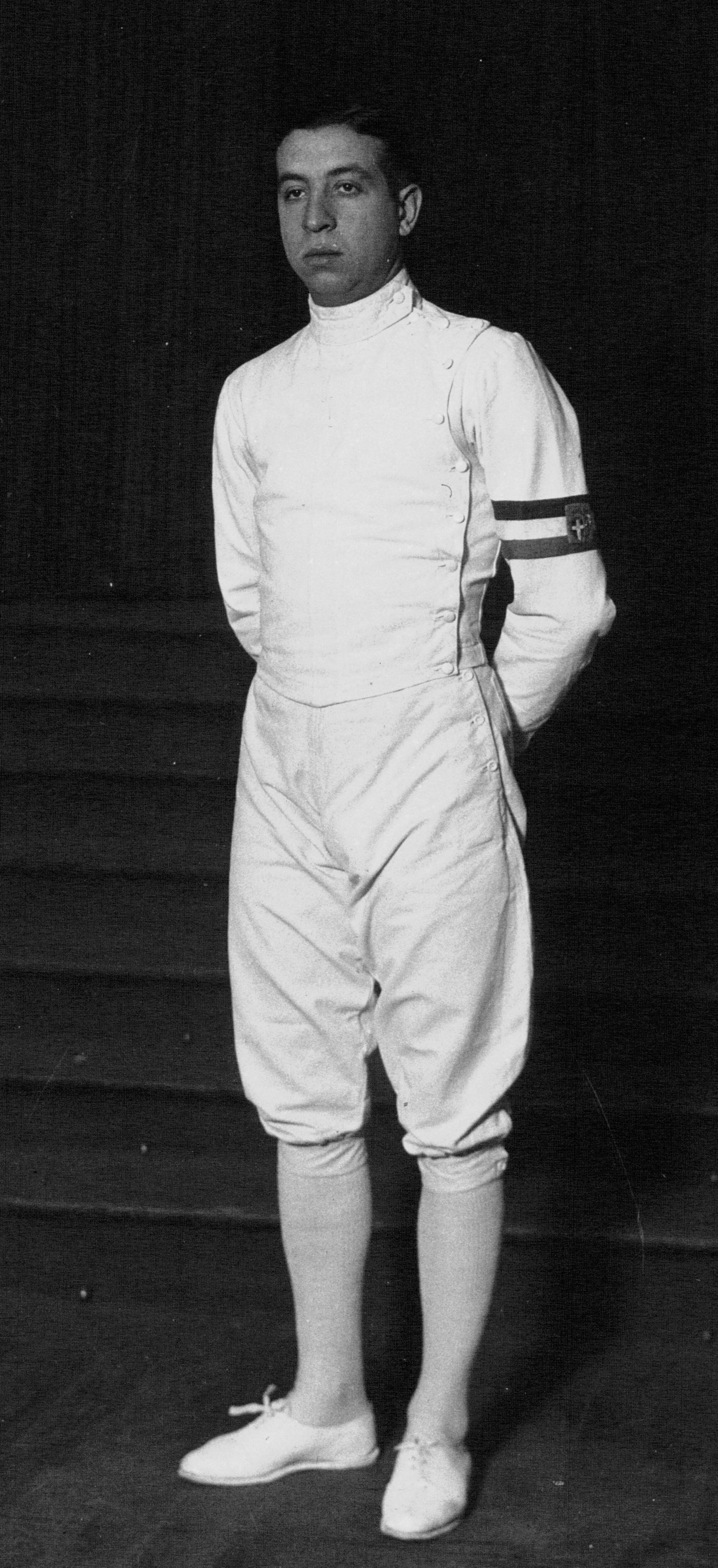
- Gustavo Marzi (1933)
- Venue: 160th Regiment State Armory
- Dates: 2–4 August 1932
- Competitors: 26 from 12 nations

Medalists
1st place, gold medalist(s)		Gustavo Marzi	Italy
2nd place, silver medalist(s)		Joe Levis	United States
3rd place, bronze medalist(s)		Giulio Gaudini	Italy

The men's foil was one of seven fencing events on the fencing at the 1932 Summer Olympics programme. It was the eighth appearance of the event. The competition was held from 2 to 4 August 1932. 26 fencers from 12 nations competed, with one other entered but not starting. Each nation was limited to three fencers. The event was won by Gustavo Marzi of Italy, the nation's third victory in the men's foil (and first since 1920). His countryman Giulio Gaudini took bronze for the second consecutive Games, becoming the fourth man to win multiple medals in the event. Joe Levis gave the United States its first men's foil medal with his silver.

== Background ==
This was the eighth appearance of the event, which has been held at every Summer Olympics except 1908 (when there was a foil display only rather than a medal event). Four of the 1928 finalists returned: silver medalist Erwin Casmir of Germany, bronze medalist Giulio Gaudini of Italy, fifth-place finisher (and 1920 and 1924 silver medalist) Philippe Cattiau of France, and eleventh-place finisher Joe Levis of the United States. Another significant Olympic veteran was 1928 semifinalist Ivan Joseph Martin Osiier of Denmark; Osiier was competing in the Games for the sixth time of his eventual seven. The favorite was Gustavo Marzi of Italy. Gaudini, who had won the world championship in 1930, was also a significant contender. The 1931 world champion, René Lemoine, had failed to make the French team.

Canada and Mexico each made their debut in the men's foil. The United States made its seventh appearance, most of any nation, having missed only the inaugural 1896 competition.

== Competition format ==
The event used a three-round format. In each round, the fencers were divided into pools to play a round-robin within the pool. Bouts were to five touches. Not all bouts were played in some pools if not necessary to determine advancement. Bout wins were used for placement, regardless of losses if fencers had competed in a different number of bouts (e.g., 3–3 Gorordo and 3–2 Every were tied in the first round). Touches against was used as the tie-breaker. Standard foil rules were used, including that touches had to be made with the tip of the foil, the target area was limited to the torso, and priority determined the winner of double touches.

- Quarterfinals: There were 3 pools of 8–9 fencers each. The top 6 fencers in each quarterfinal advanced to the semifinals.
- Semifinals: There were 2 pools of 9 fencers each. The top 5 fencers in each semifinal advanced to the final.
- Final: The final pool had 10 fencers.

== Schedule ==
Date	Time	Round
Tuesday, 2 August 1932	13:00	Quarterfinals
Wednesday, 3 August 1932	13:00	Semifinals
Thursday, 4 August 1932	13:00	Final

== Results ==
=== Quarterfinals ===
The top 6 finishers in each pool advanced to the semifinals.

==== Quarterfinal 1 ====
Rank	Fencer	Nation	Wins	Losses	TS	TR	Notes
1	Emrys Lloyd	Great Britain	5	0	25	8	Q
2	Gioacchino Guaragna	Italy	5	0	25	9	Q
3	René Bougnol	France	3	2	21	13	Q
4	Ángel Gorordo	Argentina	3	3	26	21	Q
4	Dernell Every	United States	3	2	20	21	Q
6	Axel Bloch	Denmark	3	3	17	23	Q
7	Ernest Dalton	Canada	0	6	14	30	
7	Leobardo Candiani	Mexico	0	6	7	30	
—	Barbier	Belgium	DNS				

==== Quarterfinal 2 ====
Rank	Fencer	Nation	Wins	Losses	TS	TR	Notes
1	Gustavo Marzi	Italy	7	0	35	18	Q
2	Philippe Cattiau	France	6	1	34	14	Q
3	Joe Levis	United States	5	2	33	23	Q
4	Ivan Osiier	Denmark	4	1	22	11	Q
5	Paul de Graffenried	Switzerland	3	4	19	27	Q
6	Werner Mund	Belgium	3	5	25	32	Q
7	Eduardo Prieto	Mexico	2	6	24	36	
8	Rodolfo Valenzuela	Argentina	1	6	23	31	
9	Bertram Markus	Canada	1	7	14	37	

==== Quarterfinal 3 ====
Rank	Fencer	Nation	Wins	Losses	TS	TR	Notes
1	Giulio Gaudini	Italy	7	0	35	16	Q
2	Roberto Larraz	Argentina	5	2	32	21	Q
3	Edward Gardère	France	5	3	35	27	Q
4	Erwin Casmir	Germany	4	2	28	14	Q
5	Georges de Bourguignon	Belgium	4	3	23	21	Q
6	Doris de Jong	Netherlands	3	4	23	28	Q
7	Theodore Lorber	United States	2	6	24	35	
8	Raymundo Izcoa	Mexico	2	6	19	36	
9	Erik Kofoed-Hansen	Denmark	1	7	17	38	

=== Semifinals ===
The top 5 finishers in each semifinal advanced to the final.

==== Semifinal 1 ====
Rank	Fencer	Nation	Wins	Losses	TS	TR	Notes
1	Erwin Casmir	Germany	7	1	37	16	Q
2	Roberto Larraz	Argentina	6	2	36	16	Q
3	Philippe Cattiau	France	6	2	34	24	Q
4	Giulio Gaudini	Italy	5	2	32	19	Q
5	Joe Levis	United States	4	3	23	18	Q
6	Edward Gardère	France	4	4	29	24	
7	Axel Bloch	Denmark	2	6	18	37	
8	Werner Mund	Belgium	1	7	12	38	
9	Doris de Jong	Netherlands	0	8	11	40	

==== Semifinal 2 ====
Rank	Fencer	Nation	Wins	Losses	TS	TR	Notes
1	Emrys Lloyd	Great Britain	7	1	37	19	Q
2	Gioacchino Guaragna	Italy	6	1	33	23	Q
3	Gustavo Marzi	Italy	5	2	30	21	Q
4	Ángel Gorordo	Argentina	4	2	25	19	Q
5	René Bougnol	France	4	4	30	26	Q
6	Georges de Bourguignon	Belgium	3	5	29	27	
7	Ivan Osiier	Denmark	3	5	27	33	
8	Dernell Every	United States	2	6	27	36	
9	Paul de Graffenried	Switzerland	0	8	6	40	

=== Final ===
Rank	Fencer	Nation	Wins	Losses	TS	TR
1st place, gold medalist(s)	Gustavo Marzi	Italy	9	0	45	17
2nd place, silver medalist(s)	Joe Levis	United States	6	3	38	35
3rd place, bronze medalist(s)	Giulio Gaudini	Italy	5	4	33	27
4	Gioacchino Guaragna	Italy	5	4	37	33
5	Erwin Casmir	Germany	5	4	36	34
6	Emrys Lloyd	Great Britain	5	4	35	34
7	Roberto Larraz	Argentina	3	6	33	31
8	René Bougnol	France	3	6	28	41
9	Philippe Cattiau	France	2	7	27	41
10	Ángel Gorordo	Argentina	2	7	26	42
