= Fencing at the 1932 Summer Olympics – Men's team foil =

Men's team foil at the Games of the X Olympiad
- Venue: 160th Regiment State Armory
- Dates: 31 July – 1 August 1932
- Competitors: 30 from 6 nations

Medalists
1st place, gold medalist(s)		Edward Gardère; René Lemoine; René Bondoux; René Bougnol; Philippe Cattiau; Jean Piot	France
2nd place, silver medalist(s)		Giulio Gaudini; Gioacchino Guaragna; Gustavo Marzi; Ugo Pignotti; Rodolfo Terlizzi; Giorgio Pessina	Italy
3rd place, bronze medalist(s)		George Calnan; Joe Levis; Dernell Every; Hugh Alessandroni; Frank Righeimer; Richard Steere	United States

The men's team foil was one of seven fencing events on the fencing at the 1932 Summer Olympics programme. It was the fifth appearance of the event. The competition was held from 31 July 1932 to 1 August 1932. 30 fencers from 6 nations competed. Each team could have a maximum of six fencers, with four participating in any given match. Belgium and Cuba entered, but withdrew before competition.

The competition format continued the pool play round-robin from prior years. Each of the four fencers from one team would face each of the four from the other, for a total of 16 bouts per match. The team that won more bouts won the match. Pool matches unnecessary to the result were not played (both pools resulted in one team losing both of the first two matches, so the matches between the winners were not necessary and were not played).

== Rosters ==
Argentina

- Raúl Saucedo
- Roberto Larraz
- Rodolfo Valenzuela
- Ángel Gorordo

Denmark

- Axel Bloch
- Aage Leidersdorff
- Erik Kofoed-Hansen
- Ivan Osiier

France

- Edward Gardère
- René Lemoine
- René Bondoux
- René Bougnol
- Philippe Cattiau
- Jean Piot

Italy

- Giulio Gaudini
- Gioacchino Guaragna
- Gustavo Marzi
- Ugo Pignotti
- Rodolfo Terlizzi
- Giorgio Pessina

Mexico

- Raymundo Izcoa
- Leobardo Candiani
- Eduardo Prieto
- Jesús Sánchez

United States

- George Calnan
- Joe Levis
- Dernell Every
- Hugh Alessandroni
- Frank Righeimer
- Richard Steere

== Results ==
=== Round 1 ===
The top two teams in each pool advanced to the final. Cuba and Belgium both withdrew, leaving both pools with only three teams each.

==== Pool 1 ====
Rank	Country	MW	ML	BW	BL	Notes
1	France	1	0	12	4	Q
2	United States	1	0	10	6	Q
3	Argentina	0	2	10	22	
–	Cuba	DNS	DNS	DNS	DNS	

==== Pool 2 ====
Rank	Country	MW	ML	BW	BL	Notes
1	Italy	1	0	16	0	Q
2	Denmark	1	0	11	5	Q
3	Mexico	0	2	5	27	
–	Belgium	DNS	DNS	DNS	DNS	

=== Final ===
With three teams tied at 2–1, a fence-off barrage was required.

Rank	Country	MW	ML	BW	BL	Notes
1	France	2	1	26	22	Barrage
1	Italy	2	1	31	17	Barrage
1	United States	2	1	22	26	Barrage
4	Denmark	0	3	17	31	

==== Barrage ====
The United States, which had defeated France 8–8 (54–60) in the final round, lost to France 11–5 in the barrage. The other results (Italy defeating the United States, France defeating Italy) were repeated. The Italy-France matches in both the final and barrage were 8–8 and decided on touches.

Rank	Country	MW	ML	BW	BL
1st place, gold medalist(s)	France	2	0	19	13
2nd place, silver medalist(s)	Italy	1	1	17	19
3rd place, bronze medalist(s)	United States	0	2	6	20
