= Fencing at the 1936 Summer Olympics =

Fencing at the Games of the XI Olympiad

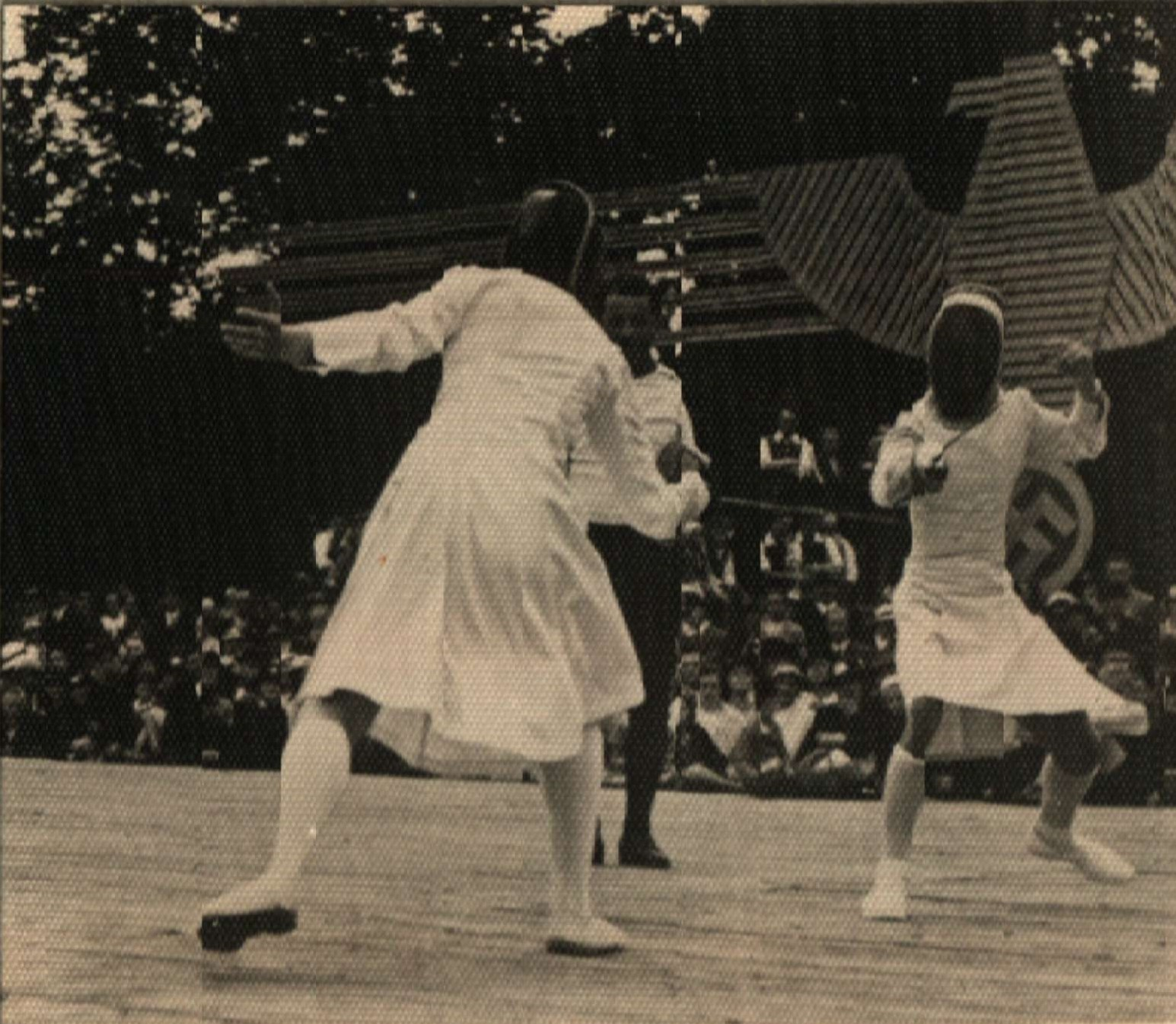
Fencing at the 1936 Summer Olympics

At the 1936 Summer Olympics, seven fencing events were contested, six for men and one for women.

== Medal summary ==
=== Men's events ===
Event	Gold	Silver	Bronze
Foil, Individual	Giulio Gaudini; Italy	Edward Gardère; France	Giorgio Bocchino; Italy
Foil, Team	Italy; Giorgio Bocchino; Manlio Di Rosa; Gioachino Guaragna; Ciro Verratti; Giulio Gaudini; Gustavo Marzi	France; Edward Gardère; André Gardere; Jacques Coutrot; René Bougnol; René Bondoux; René Lemoine	Germany; Siegfried Lerdon; August Heim; Erwin Casmir; Julius Eisenecker; Stefan Rosenbauer; Otto Adam
Épée, Individual	Franco Riccardi; Italy	Saverio Ragno; Italy	Giancarlo Cornaggia Medici; Italy
Épée, Team	Italy; Alfredo Pezzana; Edoardo Mangiarotti; Saverio Ragno; Giancarlo C. Cornaggia-Medici; Giancarlo Brusati; Franco Riccardi	Sweden; Hans Drakenberg; Hans Granfelt; Gustaf Dyrssen; Gustav Almgren; Birger Cederin; Sven Thofelt	France; Henri Dulieux; Philippe Cattiau; Georges Buchard; Paul Wormser; Michel Pécheux; Bernard Schmetz
Sabre, Individual	Endre Kabos; Hungary	Gustavo Marzi; Italy	Aladár Gerevich; Hungary
Sabre, Team	Hungary; Pál Kovács; Tibor Berczelly; Imre Rajczy; Aladár Gerevich; Endre Kabos; László Rajcsányi	Italy; Vincenzo Pinton; Aldo Masciotta; Athos Tanzini; Aldo Montano; Gustavo Marzi; Giulio Gaudini	Germany; Hans Jörger; Julius Eisenecker; August Heim; Erwin Casmir; Richard Wahl; Hans Esser

=== Women's events ===
Event	Gold	Silver	Bronze
Foil, Individual	Ilona Elek; Hungary	Helene Mayer; Germany	Ellen Preis; Austria

== Medal table ==
Rank	Nation	Gold	Silver	Bronze	Total
1	Italy	4	3	2	9
2	Hungary	3	0	1	4
3	France	0	2	1	3
4	Germany	0	1	2	3
5	Sweden	0	1	0	1
6	Austria	0	0	1	1
Totals (6 entries)		7	7	7	21

== Participating nations ==
A total of 311 fencers (270 men and 41 women) from 29 nations competed at the Berlin Games:

- Argentina (11)
- Austria (15)
- Belgium (20)
- Brazil (6)
- Bulgaria (1)
- Canada (8)
- Chile (7)
- Costa Rica (1)
- Czechoslovakia (13)
- Denmark (9)
- Egypt (6)
- France (19)
- Germany (16)
- Great Britain (18)
- Greece (8)
- Hungary (19)
- Italy (16)
- Mexico (2)
- Netherlands (11)
- Norway (5)
- Poland (11)
- Portugal (5)
- Romania (7)
- Sweden (13)
- Switzerland (18)
- Turkey (7)
- United States (22)
- Uruguay (5)
- Yugoslavia (12)
