= Fencing at the 1928 Summer Olympics – Men's foil =

Olympic fencing event

Men's foil at the Games of the IX Olympiad
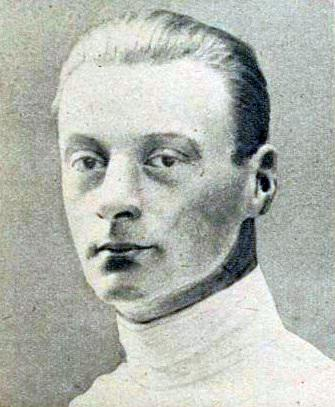
- Lucien Gaudin (1922)
- Venue: Schermzaal
- Dates: 31 July–1 August 1928
- Competitors: 54 from 22 nations

Medalists
1st place, gold medalist(s)		Lucien Gaudin	France
2nd place, silver medalist(s)		Erwin Casmir	Germany
3rd place, bronze medalist(s)		Giulio Gaudini	Italy

The men's foil was one of seven fencing events on the Fencing at the 1928 Summer Olympics programme. It was the seventh appearance of the event. The competition was held from 31 July 1928 to 1 August 1928. 54 fencers from 22 nations competed. For the third straight Games, the limit of fencers per nation was reduced (from 12 to 8 in 1920, from 8 to 4 in 1924, and from 4 to 3 in 1928). The event was won by Lucien Gaudin of France, the nation's second consecutive and fourth overall victory in the men's foil. Erwin Casmir earned silver to give Germany its first medal in the event. Giulio Gaudini of Italy took bronze.

== Background ==
This was the seventh appearance of the event, which has been held at every Summer Olympics except 1908 (when there was a foil display only rather than a medal event). Three of the 1924 finalists returned: gold medalist (and 1920 bronze medalist) Roger Ducret and two-time silver medalist Philippe Cattiau of France, along with sixth-place finisher Ivan Joseph Martin Osiier of Denmark. Osiier was competing in the Games for the fifth time of his eventual seven. The favorite was 1927 world champion Oreste Puliti of Italy, whose Olympic ban resulting from his withdrawal in the 1924 sabre competition had been lifted.

Chile, Finland, Romania, and Yugoslavia each made their debut in the men's foil. The United States made its sixth appearance, most of any nation, having missed only the inaugural 1896 competition.

== Competition format ==
The event used a three-round format. In each round, the fencers were divided into pools to play a round-robin within the pool. Bouts were to five touches. Standard foil rules were used, including that touches had to be made with the tip of the foil, the target area was limited to the torso, and priority determined the winner of double touches.

- Quarterfinals: There were 6 pools of 6–8 fencers each. The top 3 fencers in each quarterfinal advanced to the semifinals.
- Semifinals: There were 3 pools of 8 fencers each. The top 4 fencers in each semifinal advanced to the final.
- Final: The final pool had 12 fencers.

== Schedule ==
Date	Time	Round
Tuesday, 31 July 1928		Quarterfinals
Wednesday, 1 August 1928		Semifinals; Final

== Results ==
Source: Official results; De Wael

=== Round 1 ===
Each pool was a round-robin. Bouts were to five touches. The top three fencers in each pool advanced to the semifinals.

==== Pool A ====
Rank	Fencer	Nation	Wins	Notes
1	Albert De Roocker	Belgium	4	Q
2	Zoltán Schenker	Hungary	4	Q
3	George Calnan	United States	3	Q
4	Frans Mosman	Netherlands	3	
5	Jens Berthelsen	Denmark	1	
6	Mahmoud Abdin	Egypt	0	

==== Pool B ====
Rank	Fencer	Nation	Wins	Notes
1	Ivan Osiier	Denmark	5	Q
2	Erwin Casmir	Germany	4	Q
3	Giulio Gaudini	Italy	3	Q
4	Johan Falkenberg	Norway	2	
5	Gusztáv Kálniczky	Hungary	1	
6	Fernando García	Spain	0	

==== Pool C ====
Rank	Fencer	Nation	Wins	Notes
1	Lucien Gaudin	France	5	Q
2	Fritz Gazzera	Germany	3	Q
3	Joe Levis	United States	3	Q
4	Eugène Empeyta	Switzerland	2	
5	Denis Pearce	Great Britain	1	
6	Konstantinos Botasis	Greece	1	

==== Pool D ====
Rank	Fencer	Nation	Wins	Notes
1	Ugo Pignotti	Italy	7	Q
2	Oscar Viñas	Argentina	5	Q
3	Pierre Pêcher	Belgium	5	Q
4	Paul Kunze	Netherlands	3	
5	Sebastião Herédia	Portugal	3	
6	Robert Montgomerie	Great Britain	3	
7	John Albaret	Switzerland	1	
8	Konstantinos Nikolopoulos	Greece	1	

==== Pool E ====
Rank	Fencer	Nation	Wins	Notes
1	Oreste Puliti	Italy	6	Q
2	Saul Moyal	Egypt	4	Q
3	Nicolaas Nederpeld	Netherlands	4	Q
4	Thomas Wand-Tetley	Great Britain	3	
5	Frithjof Lorentzen	Norway	2	
6	Frédéric Fitting	Switzerland	1	
7	Tomás Goyoaga	Chile	1	

==== Pool F ====
Rank	Fencer	Nation	Wins	Notes
1	György Rozgonyi	Hungary	5	Q
2	Hans Lion	Austria	4	Q
3	Bertil Uggla	Sweden	3	Q
4	Domingo García	Spain	2	
5	Władysław Segda	Poland	1	
6	Ðuro Freund	Yugoslavia	0	

==== Pool G ====
Rank	Fencer	Nation	Wins	Notes
1	Philippe Cattiau	France	6	Q
2	Kurt Ettinger	Austria	5	Q
3	Raymond Bru	Belgium	4	Q
4	Kim Bærentzen	Denmark	3	
5	Jacob Bergsland	Norway	2	
6	Torvald Appelroth	Finland	1	
7	Gheorghe Caranfil	Romania	0	

==== Pool H ====
Rank	Fencer	Nation	Wins	Notes
1	Roger Ducret	France	7	Q
2	Dernell Every	United States	5	Q
3	Mihai Savu	Romania	4	Q
4	Ivar Tingdahl	Sweden	4	
5	Richard Brünner	Austria	3	
6	Joseph Misrahi	Egypt	3	
7	Julius Thomson	Germany	2	
8	Armando Alemán	Spain	0	

=== Semifinals ===
Each pool was a round-robin. Bouts were to five touches. The top four fencers in each pool advanced to the final.

==== Semifinal A ====
Rank	Fencer	Nation	Wins	Notes
1	Erwin Casmir	Germany	6	Q
2	Ugo Pignotti	Italy	5	Q
3	Philippe Cattiau	France	4	Q
4	Joe Levis	United States	3	Q
5	Hans Lion	Austria	2	
6	Zoltán Schenker	Hungary	1	
7	Nicolaas Nederpeld	Netherlands	0	
–	Albert De Roocker	Belgium	DNF	

==== Semifinal B ====
Rank	Fencer	Nation	Wins	Notes
1	Oreste Puliti	Italy	7	Q
2	Roger Ducret	France	5	Q
3	György Rozgonyi	Hungary	5	Q
4	Bertil Uggla	Sweden	3	Q
5	Mihai Savu	Romania	3	
6	Saul Moyal	Egypt	2	
7	Pierre Pêcher	Belgium	2	
8	Dernell Every	United States	1	

==== Semifinal C ====
Rank	Fencer	Nation	Wins	Notes
1	Lucien Gaudin	France	7	Q
2	Giulio Gaudini	Italy	5	Q
3	Raymond Bru	Belgium	5	Q
4	Fritz Gazzera	Germany	4	Q
5	Ivan Osiier	Denmark	3	
6	Kurt Ettinger	Austria	2	
7	George Calnan	United States	1	
8	Oscar Viñas	Argentina	1	

=== Final ===
The final was a round-robin. Bouts were to five touches. The top three finishers all ended with nine wins, and the tie was broken with a barrage.

Rank	Fencer	Nation	Wins	Notes
1	Lucien Gaudin	France	9	B
1	Giulio Gaudini	Italy	9	B
1	Erwin Casmir	Germany	9	B
4	Oreste Puliti	Italy	8	
5	Philippe Cattiau	France	7	
6	Raymond Bru	Belgium	7	
7	Ugo Pignotti	Italy	4	
8	Fritz Gazzera	Germany	4	
9	Roger Ducret	France	3	
10	György Rozgonyi	Hungary	3	
11	Joe Levis	United States	2	
12	Bertil Uggla	Sweden	1	

==== Barrage ====
The barrage was a round-robin among the three top finalists. Each of three had lost twice in the final round-robin, once to another of the three finalists and once to a fencer who did not place as well. Gaudin, who had lost to Casmir in the final, beat him in the barrage and notched his second head-to-head victory against Gaudini to win gold.

Rank	Fencer	Nation	Wins
1st place, gold medalist(s)	Lucien Gaudin	France	2
2nd place, silver medalist(s)	Erwin Casmir	Germany	1
3rd place, bronze medalist(s)	Giulio Gaudini	Italy	0
