= Yugoslavia at the 1936 Summer Olympics =

- Flag of the Kingdom of Yugoslavia
- IOC code: YUG
- NOC: Yugoslav Olympic Committee

in Berlin, Nazi Germany 1–16 August 1936
- Competitors: 93 in 13 sports
- Flag bearer: Milan Stepišnik
- Medals Ranked 25th: Gold 0 Silver 1 Bronze 0 Total 1

Summer Olympics appearances (overview)
- 1920; 1924; 1928; 1932; 1936; 1948; 1952; 1956; 1960; 1964; 1968; 1972; 1976; 1980; 1984; 1988; 1992; 1996; 2000

Other related appearances
- Serbia (1912, 2008–pres.); Croatia (1992–pres.); Slovenia (1992–pres.); Bosnia and Herzegovina (1992 S–pres.); Independent Olympic Participants (1992 S); North Macedonia (1996–pres.); Serbia and Montenegro (1996–2006); Montenegro (2008–pres.); Kosovo (2016–pres.)

The Kingdom of Yugoslavia competed at the 1936 Summer Olympics in Berlin, Germany. 93 competitors, 78 men and 15 women, took part in 59 events in 13 sports.

== Medalists ==
| Medal | Name | Sport | Event |
|---|---|---|---|
| Silver | Leon Štukelj | Gymnastics | Men's rings |

== Athletics ==
Yugoslavia's athletics team had 21 athletes (16 men and 5 women).

Men's 100 metres

- Julije Bauer

Men's 800 metres

- Emil Goršek
- Karlo Nikhazi

Men's 1500 metres

- Emil Goršek
- Ivan Krevs

Men's 5000 metres

- Ivan Krevs

Men's 110 metres hurdles

- Vane Ivanović

Men's 400 metres hurdles

- August Banščak
- Vane Ivanović

Men's marathon

- Stane Šporn

Men's long jump

- Ivo Buratović

Men's triple jump

- Jovan Mikić

Men's high jump

- Hans Mohr

Men's pole vault

- Jaša Bakov

Men's shot put

- Aleksa Kovačević

Men's discus throw

- Veljko Narančić

Men's javelin throw

- Rudolf Markušić

Men's hammer throw

- Pedro Goić
- Milan Stepišnik

Women's 100 metres

- Flora Hofman
- Vera Romanić

Women's 80 metres hurdles

- Zulejka Stefanini

Women's discus throw

- Vera Neferović

Women's javelin throw

- Jelica Stanojević

== Cycling ==
Four cyclists, all men, represented Yugoslavia in 1936.

Individual road race

- August Prosenik
- Franjo Gartner
- Josip Pokupec
- Ivan Valant

Team road race

- August Prosenik
- Franjo Gartner
- Josip Pokupec
- Ivan Valant

== Diving ==
Men

| Athlete | Event | Final | |
| Athlete | Event | Points | Rank |
|---|---|---|---|
| Branko Ziherl | 3 m springboard | 125.26 | 10 |
| Branko Ziherl | 10 m platform | 78.28 | 20 |

== Fencing ==
12 fencers, 10 men and 2 women, represented Yugoslavia in 1936.

Men's foil

- Edo Marion
- Mirko Koršič
- Marjan Pengov

Men's team foil

- Branko Tretinjak, Edo Marion, Mirko Koršič, Marjan Pengov, Aleksandar Nikolić, Vlado Mažuranić

Men's épée

- Vladimir Mažuranić
- Krešo Tretinjak

Men's sabre

- Pavao Pintarić
- Milivoj Radović
- Krešo Tretinjak

Men's team sabre

- Krešo Tretinjak, Milivoj Radović, Eugen Jakobčič, Edo Marion, Pavao Pintarić

Women's foil

- Margit Kristian
- Ivka Tavčar

== Rowing ==
Yugoslavia had 14 rowers participate in five out of seven rowing events in 1936.

Men's single sculls

- Davor Jelaska

Men's double sculls

- Vid Fašaić
- Drago Matulaj

Men's coxed pair

- Ivo Fabris
- Elko Mrduljaš
- Pavao Ljubičić (cox)

Men's coxed four

- Stipe Krnčević
- Rade Sunara
- Vice Jurišić
- Ćiril Ban
- Pavao Ljubičić (cox)

Men's eight

- Leonardo Bujas
- Rade Sunara
- Vice Jurišić
- Marjan Zaninović
- Ante Krnčević
- Špiro Grubišić
- Stipe Krnčević
- Ćiril Ban
- Pavao Ljubičić (cox)

== Shooting ==
One shooter represented Yugoslavia in 1936.

25 m rapid fire pistol

- Lazar Jovanović

== Swimming ==
Ranks given are within the heat.

Men

| Athlete | Event | Heat | | Semifinal | | Final | |
| Athlete | Event | Time | Rank | Time | Rank | Time | Rank |
|---|---|---|---|---|---|---|---|
| Draško Vilfan | 100 m freestyle | 1:00.5 | 1 Q | 1:00.5 | =5 | Did not advance | |
| Draško Vilfan | 100 m backstroke | 1:11.7 | 3 Q | 1:13.3 | 6 | Did not advance | |
| Draško Vilfan; Tone Gazzari; Zmaj Defilipis; Tone Cerer | 4 × 200 m freestyle relay | —N/a | | 9:40.3 | 4 | Did not advance | |
