= Egypt at the 1936 Summer Olympics =

- IOC code: EGY
- NOC: Egyptian Olympic Committee

in Berlin, Nazi Germany 1–16 August 1936
- Competitors: 53 in 10 sports
- Flag bearer: Moukhtar Hussein
- Medals Ranked 15th: Gold 2 Silver 1 Bronze 2 Total 5

Summer Olympics appearances (overview)
- 1912; 1920; 1924; 1928; 1932; 1936; 1948; 1952; 1956; 1960–1964; 1968; 1972; 1976; 1980; 1984; 1988; 1992; 1996; 2000; 2004; 2008; 2012; 2016; 2020; 2024

Other related appearances
- 1906 Intercalated Games –––– United Arab Republic (1960, 1964)

Egypt competed at the 1936 Summer Olympics in Berlin, Germany. 53 competitors, all men, took part in 30 events in 10 sports.

== Medalists ==
=== Gold ===
- Anwar Mesbah – Weightlifting, Lightweight
- Khadr Sayed El-Touni – Weightlifting, Middleweight

=== Silver ===
- Saleh Soliman – Weightlifting, Featherweight

=== Bronze ===
- Ibrahim Shams – Weightlifting, Featherweight
- Ibrahim Wasif – Weightlifting, Light Heavyweight

== Diving ==
Men

Athlete	Event	Final	
Athlete	Event	Points	Rank
Ahmed Ibrahim Kamel	3 m springboard	105.02	19
Ismael Ramzi	3 m springboard	121.67	11
Rauf Abu Al-Seoud	10 m platform	88.78	12
Ibrahim Khalil	10 m platform	88.08	13

== Fencing ==
Six fencers, all men, represented Egypt in 1936.

Men's foil

- Mahmoud Abdin
- Mauris Shamil
- Anwar Tawfik

Men's team foil

- Mahmoud Abdin, Mauris Shamil, Hassan Hosni Tawfik, Anwar Tawfik

Men's épée

- Marcel Boulad
- Mahmoud Abdin
- Mauris Shamil

Men's team épée

- Mahmoud Abdin, Marcel Boulad, Mauris Shamil, Hassan Hosni Tawfik, Anwar Tawfik

Men's sabre

- Mohamed Abdel Rahman

== Football ==

First Round

5 August 1936
17:30

Austria	3–1	Egypt
Steinmetz 4' 65'; Laudon 7'	Report	Sakr 85'

Berlin Mommsenstadion
Attendance: 6.000
Referee: Arthur James Jewell (GBR)

== Shooting ==
One shooter represented Egypt in 1936.

25 m rapid fire pistol

- Krikor Agathon

== Swimming ==
Men

Ranks given are within the heat.

Athlete	Event	Heat		Semifinal		Final	
Athlete	Event	Time	Rank	Time	Rank	Time	Rank
Mahmoud Kadri	100 m freestyle	1:03.8	6	Did not advance			
Zaki Saad al-Dine	100 m freestyle	1:03.7	4	Did not advance			
Mohamed Hassanein	200 m breaststroke	2:58.9	5	Did not advance			
Higazi Said; Ibrahim Fadl; Mahmoud Kadri; Zaki Saad al-Dine	4 × 200 m freestyle relay	—N/a		10:05.3	5	Did not advance	
