= Robert Dow =

Robert Dow may refer to:

- Robert Michael Dow Jr. (born 1965), United States federal judge
- Robert Dow (fencer) (born 1945), American Olympic fencer
- Robert Dow (music copyist) (1553–1588), English Renaissance academic from Oxford, author of the Dow Partbooks
- Robert Dow (poet), American poet with a work included in The Best American Poetry 1997
- Rob Dow, head coach of the Penn State Nittany Lions men's soccer team
