= Gorordo =

Gorordo is a surname. Notable people with the surname include:

- Ángel Gorordo (1904–1974), Argentine fencer
- Juan Gorordo, Filipino appointed bishop
- L. Felice Gorordo, American entrepreneur
