= Verratti =

Verratti is an Italian surname. Notable people with the surname include:

- Ciro Verratti (1907–1971), Italian fencer
- Marco Verratti (born 1992), Italian footballer
