= Jiří Jesenský =

Czechoslovak fencer

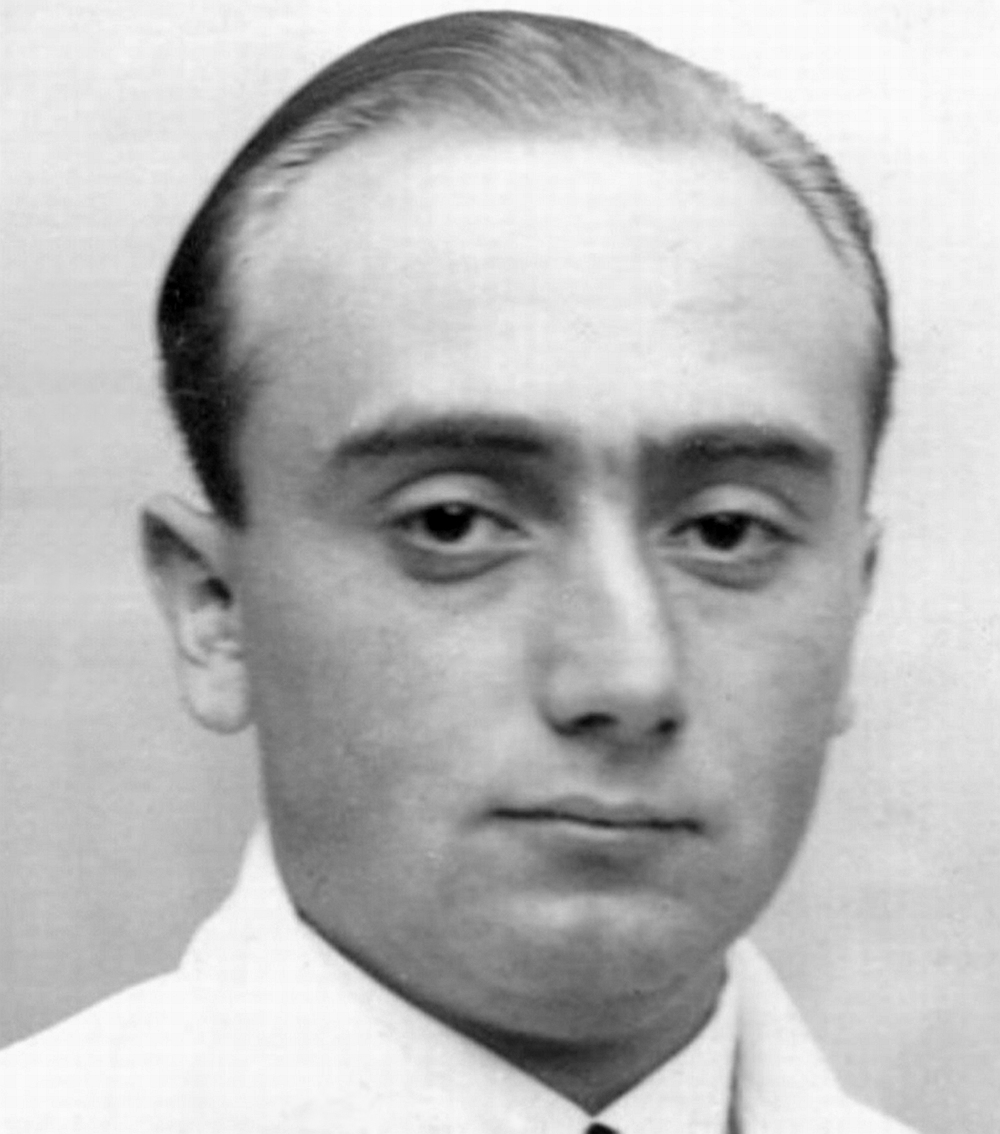

Personal information
- Born: 27 September 1905 Prague, Austria-Hungary
- Died: 24 October 1942 (aged 37) Mauthausen, Nazi Germany

Sport
- Sport: Fencing

Jiří Jesenský (27 September 1905 – 24 October 1942) was a Czechoslovak fencer and a member of the Resistance during World War II. He was executed by firing squad in the Mauthausen concentration camp.

== Life ==
Jesenský was born in Prague to Milada and František Jesenský. He was a cousin of the writer Milena Jesenská.

He competed in the individual (19th place) and team (10th place) foil events at the 1936 Summer Olympics.

He was an active member of the resistance movement in Czechoslovakia during World War II.

In 1942 he was arrested by the Gestapo; his wife Žofia, brother Jan and sister-in-law Alžběta were also arrested and taken to the Mauthausen concentration camp, Austria where all four of them died on October 24, 1942.
