= Emrys Lloyd =

British fencer (1905–1987)

Emrys Lloyd OBE
Personal information
- Full name: John Emrys Lloyd
- Born: 8 September 1905 Edmonton, London, England
- Died: 28 June 1987 (aged 81) Henley-on-Thames, England

Sport
- Sport: Fencing

John Emrys Lloyd OBE (8 September 1905 – 28 June 1987) was a British fencer. He competed at four Olympic Games, as well as being an official at four Olympics, and the flag bearer for Great Britain at the 1948 Summer Olympics. He was later appointed an OBE.

== Biography ==
Lloyd was born in Edmonton, London, in 1905 and attended Winchester College and King's College, Cambridge. In 1924, Lloyd won the Public Schools Championship in fencing. He also won the foil title at the British Fencing Championships seven times from 1928 to 1938, and three bronze medals at the World Fencing Championships in the 1930s.

Lloyd's first Olympic Games were the 1932 Summer Olympics in Los Angeles, where he finished in sixth place in the men's individual foil. Lloyd was also selected as the reserve cox for the men's eight rowing, but he did not compete in the event. Four years later, at the 1936 Summer Olympics in Berlin, Lloyd took part in the individual foil and team foil events.

In the 1946 New Year Honours, Lloyd was appointed Officer of the Order of the British Empire (OBE) for his work in the Royal Air Force, where he had held the rank of Acting Wing Commander with the Auxiliary Air Force.

After World War II, Lloyd competed at his home Games at the 1948 Summer Olympics in London. He competed in the team foil and team sabre events, as well as the individual foil event where he recorded his best finish at the Olympics, with fourth place. The Times said that it was the "finest achievement in the history of British fencing". At the 1948 Summer Olympics, Lloyd was also the flag bearer for Great Britain at the Opening Ceremony.

Lloyd's final Olympics as a competitor was the 1952 Summer Olympics in Helsinki, where he took part in the team foil.

Lloyd was also the President of the Amateur Fencing Association, and in 1978, Lloyd was a recipient of the Silver Olympic Order. He was also the President of the Welsh Fencing Union, with the Emrys Lloyd Welsh Intermediate Foil Trophy named after him. Outside of fencing, Lloyd was also a commercial lawyer and was a legal adviser to the British Olympic Association.
