= Stefan Rosenbauer =

German fencer and photographer

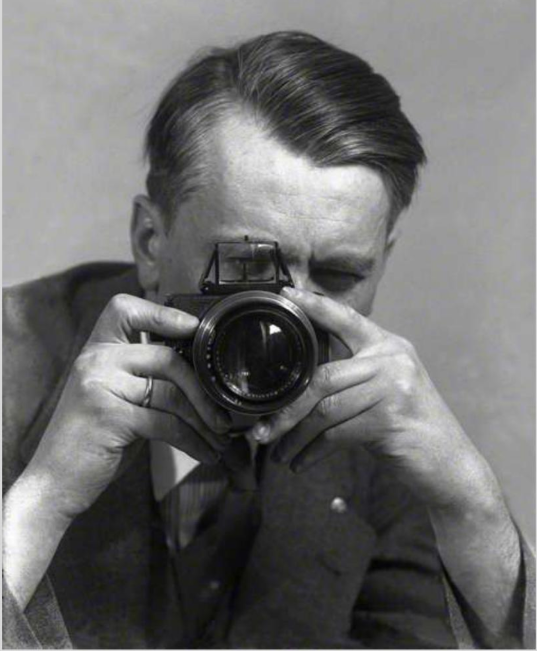

Personal information
- Born: 24 March 1896 Biberach an der Riss, German Empire
- Died: 18 August 1967 (aged 71) Rio de Janeiro, Brazil

Sport
- Sport: Fencing
Medal record
Men's fencing
Representing Germany
Olympic Games
Bronze medal – third place	1936 Berlin	Foil, team

Stefan Rosenbauer (24 March 1896 – 18 August 1967) was a German fencer and photographer. He won a bronze medal in the team foil event at the 1936 Summer Olympics.
