= René Bondoux =

French fencer (1905–2001)

- De gauche à droite : Jacques Croquez, Michel Levesque, René Bondoux et Fabry, escrimeurs français.

Personal information
- Born: 26 May 1905 Bar-sur-Seine, France
- Died: 6 May 2001 (aged 95) Neuilly-sur-Seine, France

Sport
- Sport: Fencing
Medal record
Men's fencing
Representing France
Olympic Games
Gold medal – first place	1932 Los Angeles	Team foil
Silver medal – second place	1936 Berlin	Team foil

René Bondoux (26 May 1905 – 6 May 2001) was a French fencer. He won a gold medal in the team foil event at the 1932 Summer Olympics and a silver in the same event at the 1936 Summer Olympics.
