= Giorgio Bocchino =

Italian fencer (1913–1995)

Personal information
- Born: 14 July 1913 Florence, Italy
- Died: 4 December 1995 (aged 82) Florence, Italy

Sport
- Sport: Fencing
Medal record
Men's fencing
Representing Italy
Olympic Games
Gold medal – first place	1936 Berlin	Foil, team
Bronze medal – third place	1936 Berlin	Foil, individual

Giorgio Bocchino (14 July 1913 – 4 December 1995) was an Italian fencer. He won a gold and bronze medal at the 1936 Summer Olympics.
