= Richard Steere (fencer) =

American fencer (1909–2001)

Personal information
- Born: March 5, 1909 Kansas City, Missouri, United States
- Died: March 17, 2001 (aged 92) Lanham, Maryland, United States

Sport
- Sport: Fencing
Medal record
Men's fencing
Representing United States
Olympic Games
Bronze medal – third place	1932 Los Angeles	Foil, team

Richard Clarke Steere (5 March 1909 – 17 March 2001) was an American Olympic fencer. He won a bronze medal in the team foil event at the 1932 Summer Olympics.

Steere was born in Kansas City, Missouri, and raised in Chicago. Steere studied at the United States Naval Academy, where he was on the medalist foil team. He served in the United States Navy and worked as a meteorologist under George S. Patton.
