= Mahmoud Kadri =

Egyptian swimmer (born 1917)

Personal information
- Born: 8 October 1917

Sport
- Sport: Swimming

Mahmoud Kadri (born 8 October 1917, date of death unknown) was an Egyptian swimmer. He competed in two events at the 1936 Summer Olympics. Kadri is deceased.
