= Robert Dow (fencer) =

American fencer

Robert Stanley Dow
Personal information
- Born: March 8, 1945 New York, New York, United States
- Died: August 23, 2024 (aged 79)

Sport
- Sport: Fencing

Robert Stanley Dow (March 8, 1945 – August 23, 2024) was an American fencer. He competed in the team sabre event at the 1972 Summer Olympics.

He received his Bachelor of Science in Civil and Environmental Engineering from the Newark College of Engineering (now New Jersey Institute of Technology (NJIT)), a Masters of Science in Civil and Environment Engineering from NYU and an MBA from Columbia University. He is the retired senior managing partner of Lord Abbett.

Raised in Westwood and Washington Township, Bergen County, New Jersey, Dow is the son of Olympic fencers Warren Dow and Helen Mrocckowska, who both competed at the 1948 Summer Olympics in London.
