= György Rozgonyi (fencer) =

Hungarian fencer

Personal information
- Born: 17 June 1890 Budapest, Hungary
- Died: 30 June 1967 (aged 77)

Sport
- Sport: Fencing

György Rozgonyi (17 June 1890 – 30 June 1967) was a Hungarian fencer. He competed in the individual and team foil events at the 1928 Summer Olympics.
