= Siegfried Lerdon =

German fencer

Personal information
- Born: 8 August 1905 Frankfurt, German Empire
- Died: 9 October 1964 (aged 59) Frankfurt, West Germany

Sport
- Sport: Fencing
Medal record
Men's fencing
Representing Germany
Olympic Games
Bronze medal – third place	1936 Berlin	Foil, team

Siegfried Lerdon (8 August 1905 – 9 October 1964) was a German fencer. He won a bronze medal in the team foil event at the 1936 Summer Olympics.
