= Krešo Tretinjak =

Yugoslav fencer (1905–1987)

Personal information
- Born: 4 July 1905
- Died: 22 September 1987 (aged 82)

Sport
- Sport: Fencing

Krešo Tretinjak (4 July 1905 – 22 September 1987) was a Yugoslav épée and sabre fencer. He competed in the three events at the 1936 Summer Olympics.
