= Otto Adam =

German fencer (1909–1977)

Personal information
- Born: 24 November 1909 Wiesbaden, Germany
- Died: 2 December 1977 (aged 68) Ottweiler, West Germany

Sport
- Sport: Fencing
Medal record
Men's fencing
Representing Germany
Olympic Games
Bronze medal – third place	1936 Berlin	Foil, team

Otto Adam (24 November 1909 – 2 December 1977) was a German fencer. He won a bronze medal in the team foil event at the 1936 Summer Olympics.

Adam was born on 24 November 1909 in Wiesbaden. He died on 2 December 1977 in Ottweiler, at the age of 68.
