= Marcel Boulad =

Egyptian fencer

Personal information
- Born: 1 March 1905 Cairo, Egypt
- Died: 5 April 1977 (aged 72) Southampton, New York, United States

Sport
- Sport: Fencing

Marcel Boulad (Arabic: مارسيل بولاد) (1 March 1905 – 5 April 1977) was an Egyptian fencer. He competed in the individual and team épée events at the 1936 Summer Olympics.
