= Warren Dow =

American fencer (1905–1965)

Personal information
- Born: Warren Alvin Dow; January 12, 1905 Paterson, New Jersey, U.S.
- Died: November 22, 1965 (aged 60) Westwood, New Jersey, U.S.

Sport
- Sport: Fencing

Warren Alvin Dow (January 12, 1905 – November 22, 1965) was an American fencer. He competed in the team foil event at the 1936 Summer Olympics.

Dow competed at the 1936 Summer Olympics in Berlin and after the war at the 1948 Summer Olympics in London, together with his wife, the former Helen Mrocckowska. Their son, Robert Dow, competed in the team sabre event at the 1972 Summer Olympics in Munich.
