= Jesús Sánchez (fencer) =

Mexican fencer

Sport
- Sport: Fencing

Jesús Sánchez was a Mexican fencer. He competed in the team foil event at the 1932 Summer Olympics.
