= Oscar Viñas =

Argentine fencer

Personal information
- Born: 1877
- Died: Unknown

Sport
- Sport: Fencing

Oscar Viñas (born 1877, date of death unknown) was an Argentine Olympic fencer. He competed in the individual foil event at the 1928 Summer Olympics.
