= Josef Ritz =

Austrian fencer

Personal information
- Born: 14 December 1899 Vienna, Austria
- Died: 31 July 1943 (aged 43) Kharkiv, Ukraine

Sport
- Sport: Fencing

Josef Ritz (14 December 1899 – 31 July 1943) was an Austrian fencer. He competed in the individual foil event at the 1936 Summer Olympics.

He fought in the Wehrmacht and was killed on the Eastern Front, near Kharkov in 1943 during World War II.
