= Pavao Pintarić =

Yugoslav fencer (1913–1990)

Personal information
- Full name: Mladen Pavao Pintarić
- Born: 4 April 1913 Nova Gradiška
- Died: 21 April 1990 (aged 77) Zagreb

Sport
- Sport: Fencing
- Event: Sabre

Mladen Pavao Pintarić (4 April 1913 – 21 April 1990) was a Yugoslav fencer. He competed in the individual and team sabre events at the 1936 Summer Olympics.
