= Fritz Gazzera =

German fencer

Personal information
- Born: 4 December 1907 Offenbach am Main, Germany
- Died: 5 January 1996 (aged 88) Bonn, Germany

Sport
- Sport: Fencing

Fritz Gazzera (4 December 1907 – 5 January 1996) was a German fencer. He competed in the individual and team foil and team épée events at the 1928 Summer Olympics.
