= Ðuro Freund =

Yugoslav fencer

Sport
- Sport: Fencing

Ðuro Freund was a Yugoslav fencer. He competed in the individual foil event at the 1928 Summer Olympics. Freund is deceased.
