= Zaki Saad al-Dine =

Egyptian swimmer

Personal information
- Full name: Zaki Saad al-Dine

Sport
- Sport: Swimming

Zaki Saad al-Dine was an Egyptian swimmer. He competed in two events at the 1936 Summer Olympics.
