= Milivoj Radović =

Yugoslav fencer (1915–1987)

Personal information
- Born: 22 February 1915
- Died: 17 February 1987 (aged 71)

Sport
- Sport: Fencing

Milivoj Radović (22 February 1915 – 17 February 1987) was a Yugoslav fencer. He competed in the individual and team sabre events at the 1936 Summer Olympics.
