= René Bougnol =

French fencer (1911–1956)

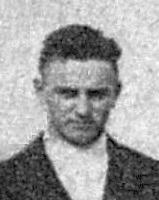

Personal information
- Born: 7 January 1911 Montpellier, France
- Died: 20 June 1956 (aged 45) Montpellier, France

Sport
- Sport: Fencing
Medal record
Men's fencing
Representing France
Olympic Games
Gold medal – first place	1932 Los Angeles	Team foil
Gold medal – first place	1948 London	Team foil
Silver medal – second place	1936 Berlin	Team foil
Mediterranean Games
Gold medal – first place	1951 Alexandria	Individual épée
Silver medal – second place	1951 Alexandria	Team épée
Silver medal – second place	1951 Alexandria	Team foil

René Bougnol (7 January 1911 – 20 June 1956) was a French fencer. He won two gold medals and a silver at three different Olympics in the team foil event. He competed at the 1951 Mediterranean Games where he won a gold medal in the individual épée event and silver medals in the épée and foil team events.
