= Karl Sudrich =

Austrian fencer

Personal information
- Born: 7 October 1895 Hodschein, Austria
- Died: 18 September 1944 (aged 48) Hungary

Sport
- Sport: Fencing

Karl Sudrich (7 October 1895 – 18 September 1944) was an Austrian fencer. He competed in the individual and team foil and sabre events at the 1936 Summer Olympics.

He fought in the Wehrmacht and died from his wounds in a military hospital in Hungary during World War II.
