= Julius Eisenecker =

German fencer (1903–1981)

Personal information
- Born: 21 March 1903 Frankfurt, German Empire
- Died: 12 October 1981 (aged 78) Frankfurt, West Germany

Sport
- Sport: Fencing
Medal record
Men's fencing
Representing Germany
Olympic Games
Bronze medal – third place	1936 Berlin	Foil, team
Bronze medal – third place	1936 Berlin	Sabre, team

Julius Eisenecker (21 March 1903 – 12 October 1981) was a German fencer. He won two bronze medals at the 1936 Summer Olympics.
