= André Gardère =

French fencer (1913–1977)

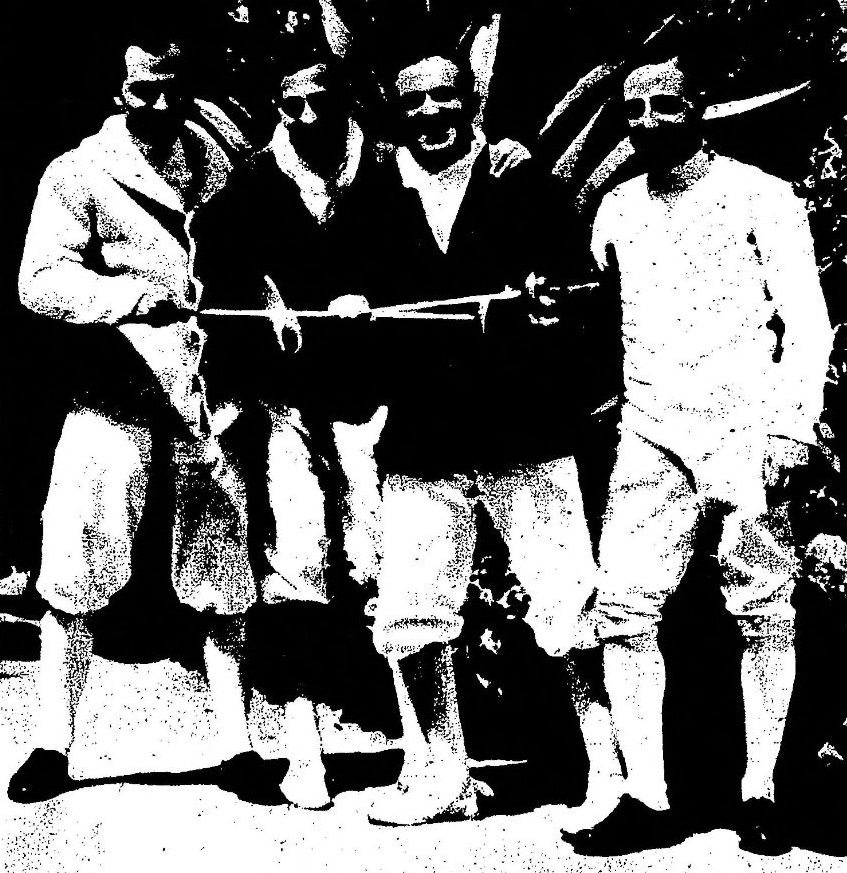
- René Lemoine, André et Edward Gardère, and Jacques Coutrot

Personal information
- Born: 8 May 1913 Gérardmer, France
- Died: 16 February 1977 (aged 63)

Sport
- Sport: Fencing
Medal record
Men's fencing
Representing France
Olympic Games
Silver medal – second place	1936 Berlin	Foil, team

André Gardère (8 May 1913 – 16 February 1977) was a French foil and sabre fencer. He won a silver medal in the team foil event at the 1936 Summer Olympics.
