= Branko Tretinjak =

Yugoslav fencer (1907–1989)

Personal information
- Born: 16 May 1907
- Died: 27 December 1989 (aged 82)

Sport
- Sport: Fencing

Branko Tretinjak (16 May 1907 – 27 December 1989) was a Yugoslav fencer. He competed in the team foil event at the 1936 Summer Olympics.
