= Michel Fauconnet =

Swiss fencer

Personal information
- Born: 6 September 1909
- Died: 1 November 1988 (aged 79)

Sport
- Sport: Fencing

Michel Fauconnet (6 September 1909 – 1 November 1988) was a Swiss foil fencer. He competed at the 1928 and 1936 Summer Olympics.
