= Ivan Vladimir Mažuranić =

Croatian fencer (1915–1985)

Personal information
- Full name: Ivan Vladimir Mažuranić
- Nationality: Croatian

Sport
- Sport: Fencing

Ivan Vladimir Mažuranić was a Yugoslav fencer. He competed in the team foil and individual épée events at the 1936 Summer Olympics.
