= Ciro Verratti =

Italian fencer (1907–1971)

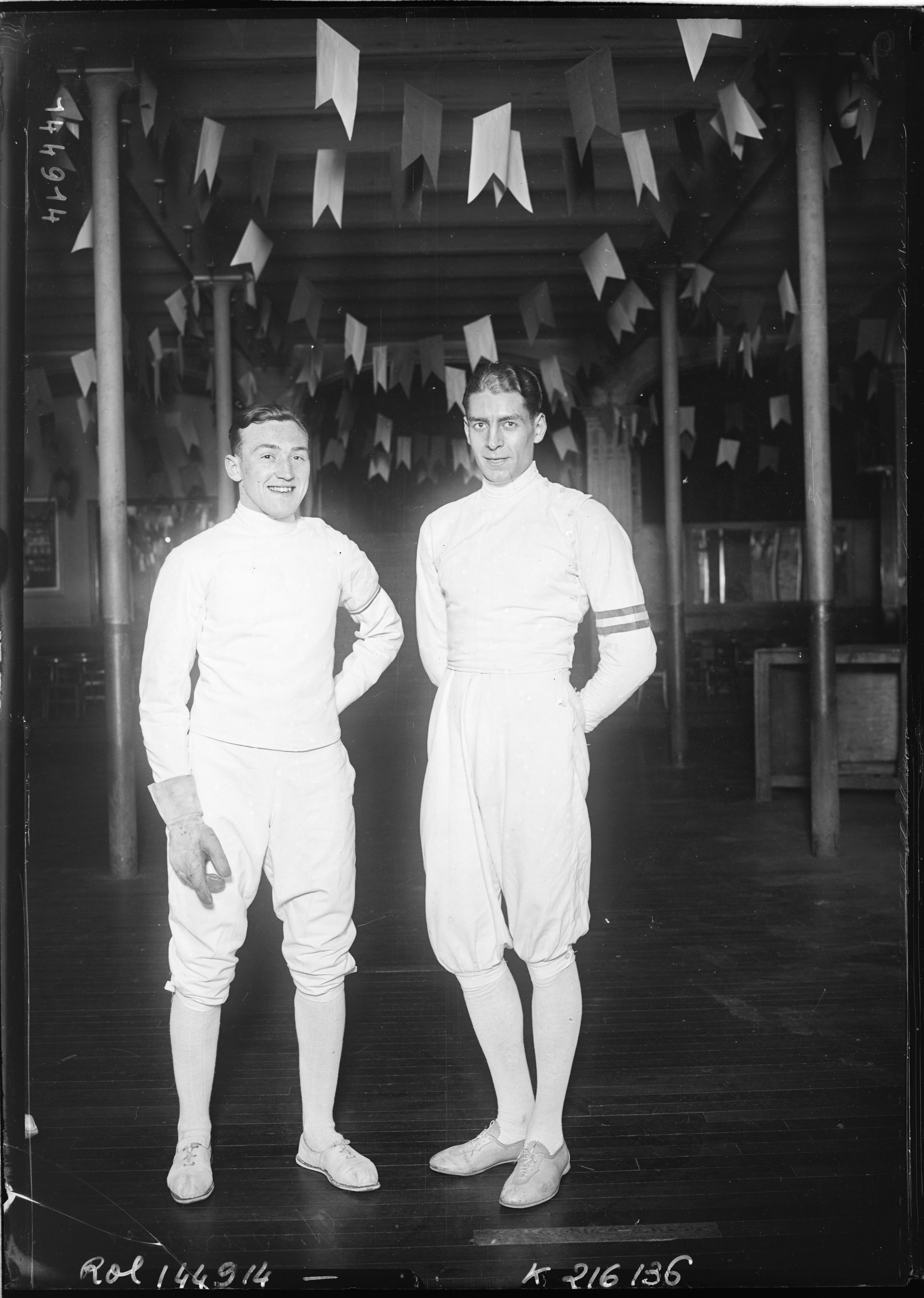

Personal information
- Born: 17 August 1907 Archi, Italy
- Died: 6 July 1971 (aged 63) Milan, Italy

Sport
- Sport: Fencing
Medal record
Men's fencing
Representing Italy
Olympic Games
Gold medal – first place	1936 Berlin	Foil, team

Ciro Verratti (17 August 1907 – 6 July 1971) was an Italian fencer. He won a gold medal in the team foil event at the 1936 Summer Olympics. He was cast as the lead in the 1937 pirate swashbuckler The Black Corsair, his only film role.
