= Nils Jørgensen =

Norwegian fencer

Personal information
- Born: 19 June 1911 Oslo, Norway
- Died: 15 January 1996 (aged 84) Oslo, Norway

Sport
- Sport: Fencing

Nils Jørgensen (19 June 1911 – 15 January 1996) was a Norwegian fencer. He competed in the individual and team foil events at the 1936 Summer Olympics.
