= Raymundo Izcoa =

Mexican fencer

Personal information
- Born: 15 March 1891 Mexico City, Mexico
- Died: 7 May 1970 (aged 79)

Sport
- Sport: Fencing

Raymundo Izcoa (15 March 1891 – 7 May 1970) was a Mexican fencer. He competed in the individual and team foil events at the 1932 Summer Olympics.
