= József Hátszeghy =

Hungarian fencer

Personal information
- Born: 13 January 1904 Arač, Austria-Hungary (today Vojvodina, Serbia)
- Died: 18 January 1988 (aged 84) Budapest, Hungary

Sport
- Sport: Fencing

József Hátszeghy (13 January 1904 – 18 January 1988) was a Hungarian foil fencer and coach. He competed at the 1936 and 1948 Summer Olympics.

== Family ==
He was born in Arač, Austria-Hungary. His father, Adolf Hatz, and his mother, Anna Reimann, wanted a military career for all four of their sons. His brother Ottó Hátszeghy also became a Hungarian military officer and an Olympic fencer.
