= Béla Bay =

Hungarian fencer

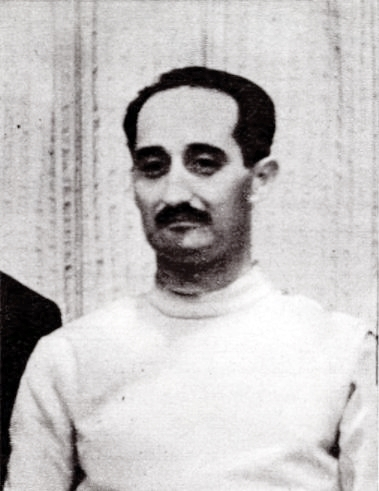
- Béla Bay in 1941.

Personal information
- Born: 8 February 1907 Szinérváralja, Austria-Hungary
- Died: 26 July 1999 (aged 92) Budapest, Hungary

Sport
- Sport: Fencing

Béla Bay (8 February 1907 – 26 July 1999) was a Hungarian épée and foil fencer. He competed at the 1936 and 1948 Summer Olympics.
