= Leobardo Candiani =

Mexican fencer

Personal information
- Born: 28 December 1904 Salina Cruz, Mexico
- Died: 16 September 1986 (aged 81)

Sport
- Sport: Fencing

Leobardo Candiani (28 December 1904 – 16 September 1986) was a Mexican fencer. He competed in the individual and team foil events at the 1932 Summer Olympics.
