= Aleksandar Nikolić (fencer) =

Yugoslav fencer

Personal information
- Born: 12 May 1919

Sport
- Sport: Fencing

Aleksandar Nikolić (born 12 May 1919, date of death unknown) was a Yugoslav fencer. He competed in the team foil event at the 1936 Summer Olympics.
