= Nikolaos Manolesos =

Greek fencer

Personal information
- Born: 1908

Sport
- Sport: Fencing

Nikolaos Manolesos (Greek: Νικόλαος Μανωλέσος; born 1908, date of death unknown) was a Greek fencer. He competed in the individual and team foil and sabre events at the 1936 Summer Olympics.
