= Edward Gardère =

French fencer (1909–1997)

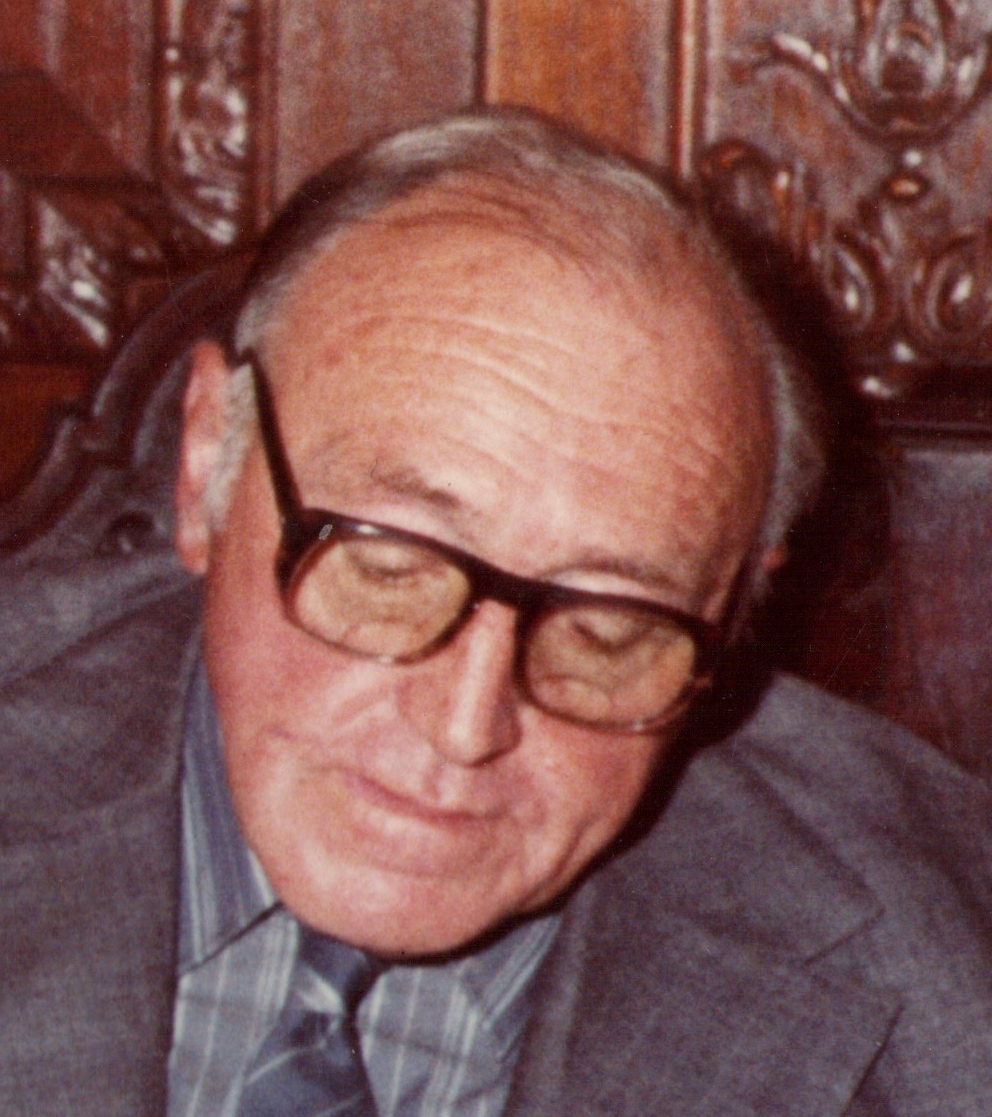
- Edward Gardère

Personal information
- Born: 25 February 1909 Gérardmer, France
- Died: 24 July 1997 (aged 88)

Sport
- Sport: Fencing
Medal record
Men's fencing
Representing France
Olympic Games
Gold medal – first place	1932 Los Angeles	Team foil
Silver medal – second place	1936 Berlin	Individual foil
Silver medal – second place	1936 Berlin	Team foil

Edward Gardère (25 February 1909 – 24 July 1997) was a French foil and sabre fencer. He won a gold medal at the 1932 Summer Olympics and two silvers at the 1936 Summer Olympics.
