= Jean Rubli =

Swiss fencer

Personal information
- Born: 19 August 1910
- Died: 6 September 1976 (aged 66)

Sport
- Sport: Fencing

Jean Rubli (19 August 1910 – 6 September 1976) was a Swiss fencer. He competed at the 1936 and 1948 Summer Olympics.
