= August Heim =

German fencer (1904–1976)

Personal information
- Born: 13 March 1904 Offenbach am Main, German Empire
- Died: 8 May 1976 (aged 72) Offenbach am Main, West Germany

Sport
- Sport: Fencing
Medal record
Men's fencing
Representing Germany
Olympic Games
Bronze medal – third place	1936 Berlin	Foil, team
Bronze medal – third place	1936 Berlin	Sabre, team

August Heim (13 March 1904 – 8 May 1976) was a German fencer. He won two bronze medals at the 1936 Summer Olympics.
