= Gottfried von Meiss =

Swiss fencer

Personal information
- Born: 22 September 1909
- Died: 22 December 2000 (aged 91)

Sport
- Sport: Fencing

Gottfried von Meiss (22 September 1909 – 22 December 2000) was a Swiss fencer. He competed at the 1936 and 1948 Summer Olympics.
