= Jens Frølich =

Norwegian fencer (1914–1938)

Personal information
- Born: 28 April 1914 Oslo, Norway
- Died: 27 December 1938 (aged 24) Oslo, Norway

Sport
- Sport: Fencing

Jens Frølich (28 April 1914 – 27 December 1938) was a Norwegian fencer. He competed in the individual and team foil events at the 1936 Summer Olympics.
