= Georges de Bourguignon =

Belgian fencer

Personal information
- Born: 25 February 1910 Sint-Lambrechts-Woluwe, Belgium
- Died: 31 December 1989 (aged 79) Kraainem

Sport
- Sport: Fencing
Medal record
Men's fencing
Representing Belgium
Olympic Games
Bronze medal – third place	1948 London	Foil, team

Georges de Bourguignon (25 February 1910 – 31 December 1989) was a Belgian fencer. He won a bronze medal in the team foil event at the 1948 Summer Olympics.
