= Marjan Pengov =

Yugoslav fencer (1913–1991)

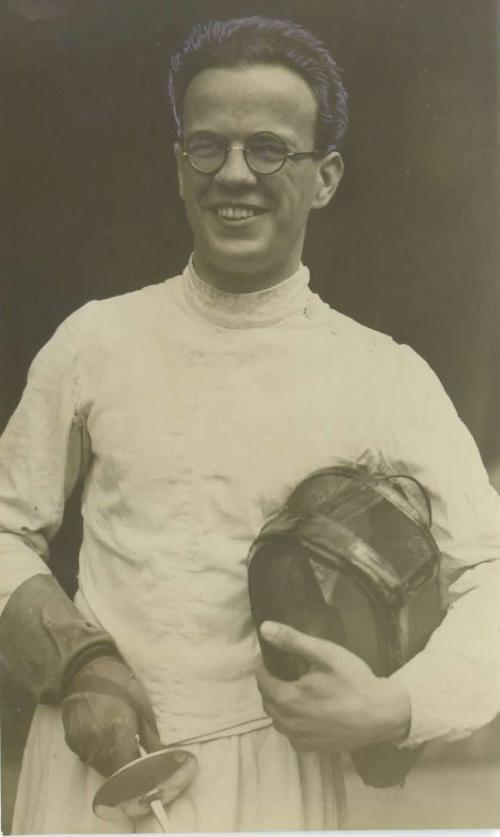

Personal information
- Born: 19 April 1913 Laibach, Austria-Hungary
- Died: April 1991 (aged 77–78)

Sport
- Sport: Fencing

Marjan Pengov (19 April 1913 – April 1991) was a Yugoslav fencer. He competed in the individual and team foil events at the 1936 Summer Olympics.
