= Hugh Alessandroni =

American fencer

Personal information
- Born: January 15, 1908 New York, New York, United States
- Died: March 31, 1989 (aged 81) Little Silver, New Jersey, United States

Sport
- Sport: Fencing
Medal record
Men's fencing
Representing United States
Olympic Games
Bronze medal – third place	1932 Los Angeles	Foil, team

Hugh Alessandroni (August 2, 1908 – December 8, 1977) was an American fencer. He fenced for the Columbia Lions fencing team. He won a bronze medal in the team foil event at the 1932 Summer Olympics.

== See also ==
- List of USFA Hall of Fame members
