= Aage Leidersdorff =

Danish fencer

Personal information
- Born: 10 April 1910 Copenhagen, Denmark
- Died: 19 February 1970 (aged 59) Gentofte, Denmark

Sport
- Sport: Fencing

Achievements and titles
- Olympic finals: Foil, Team – 4th (1932) Sabre, Team – 5th (1932) Épée, Team – 5th (tie) (1932)

Aage Leidersdorff (10 April 1910 – 19 February 1970) was a Danish fencer and referee. He competed at the 1932, 1936 and 1948 Summer Olympics. Leidersdorff, a Jewish sportsman, received the B.T. Gold medal in 1945 as Danish sportsperson of the year. He appeared in a short documentary film, Olympiadetræning (also known as Training for the Olympics in 1948). Described by the Nordisk familjeboks sportlexikon as the Nordic countries foremost foil and sabre fencer, he won multiple national and Nordic championships in fencing.

He operated a fur shop, Aage Leidersdorff Pelse, in Copenhagen at Østergade 15. The business was founded in 1908 by his father, also named Aage Leidersdorff (born 1882). During the Second World War, he was evacuated to Sweden along with other Danish Jews.
