= Mauris Shamil =

Egyptian fencer

Hassan Mauris Shamil
Personal information
- Born: 1906

Sport
- Sport: Fencing

Hassan Mauris Shamil (born 1906, date of death unknown) was an Egyptian fencer. He competed in the individual and team foil and épée events at the 1936 Summer Olympics.
