= Anwar Tawfik =

Egyptian fencer (born 1914)

Personal information
- Born: 31 July 1914

Sport
- Sport: Fencing

Anwar Tawfik (born 31 July 1914, date of death unknown) was an Egyptian fencer. He competed in the individual and team foil and team épée events at the 1936 Summer Olympics.
