= Dernell Every =

American fencer (1906–1994)

Personal information
- Born: August 18, 1906 Athens, New York, U.S.
- Died: September 11, 1994 (aged 88) Mount Kisco, New York, U.S.

Sport
- Sport: Fencing
Medal record
Men's fencing
Representing United States
Olympic Games
Bronze medal – third place	1932 Los Angeles	Foil, team

Dernell Every (August 18, 1906 – September 11, 1994) was an American fencer. He won a bronze medal in the team foil event at the 1932 Summer Olympics.
