= Raymond Bru =

Belgian fencer (1906–1989)

Personal information
- Born: Raymond Jean Bru; 30 March 1906
- Died: December 1989 (aged 83)

Sport
- Sport: Fencing
Medal record
Men's fencing
Representing Belgium
Olympic Games
Bronze medal – third place	1948 London	Foil, team

Raymond Jean Bru (30 March 1906 – December 1989) was a Belgian fencer. He won a bronze medal in the team foil event at the 1948 Summer Olympics.
