= Denis Pearce =

British fencer

Personal information
- Born: 8 April 1896 Birmingham, West Midlands, England
- Died: 3 July 1968 (aged 72)

Sport
- Sport: Fencing

Alfred Denison Pearce (8 April 1896 – 3 July 1968) was a British fencer. He competed at the 1928 and 1936 Summer Olympics. In 1927, he won the foil title at the British Fencing Championships.
