= René Lemoine =

French fencer (1905–1995)

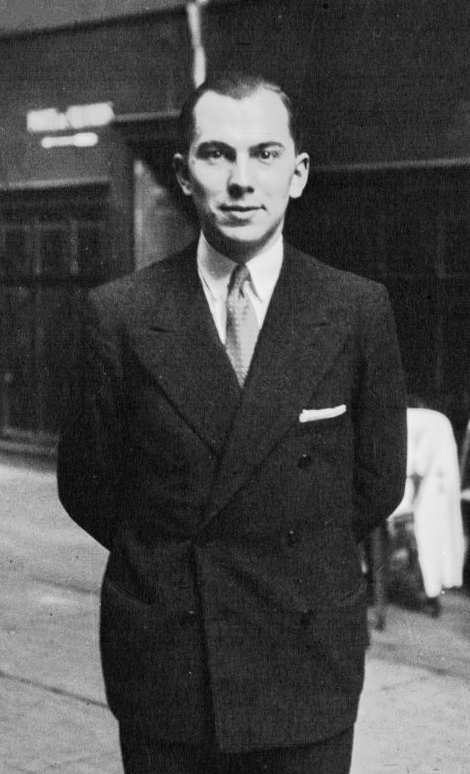
- René Lemoine in 1931

Personal information
- Born: 29 December 1905 Meurthe-et-Moselle, France
- Died: 19 December 1995 (aged 89) Paris, France

Sport
- Sport: Fencing
Medal record
Representing France
Olympic Games
Gold medal – first place	1932 Los Angeles	Team foil
Silver medal – second place	1936 Berlin	Team foil

René Alphonse Lemoine (29 December 1905 – 19 December 1995) was a French fencer. He won a gold medal in the team foil event at the 1932 Summer Olympics and a silver in the same event at the 1936 Summer Olympics.

At the world championships, official and unofficial, Lemoine won an individual gold in 1931 and a bronze in 1937. He also won team silver medals in 1930, 1934, 1935 and 1937.

Lemoine was the son of a general manager of Peugeot and was trained in mathematics and law. After briefly studying in Chad, he went to Equatorial Africa in 1938 and became a coffee farmer and exporter of colonial goods. During World War II, he headed the civil and military resistance in Central African Republic and supported French forces of Charles de Gaulle. In 1940, he was jailed by the Vichy authorities, but released after 1.5 months. He then fought in Madagascar and Northern Africa. After the war Lemoine resumed trading agricultural products. He was made an Officer of the Legion of Honour and was awarded the Croix de Guerre, among other military decorations. Until 1981 he served as a French representative for the Central High Council of French Abroad.
