= Gustavo Marzi =

Italian fencer

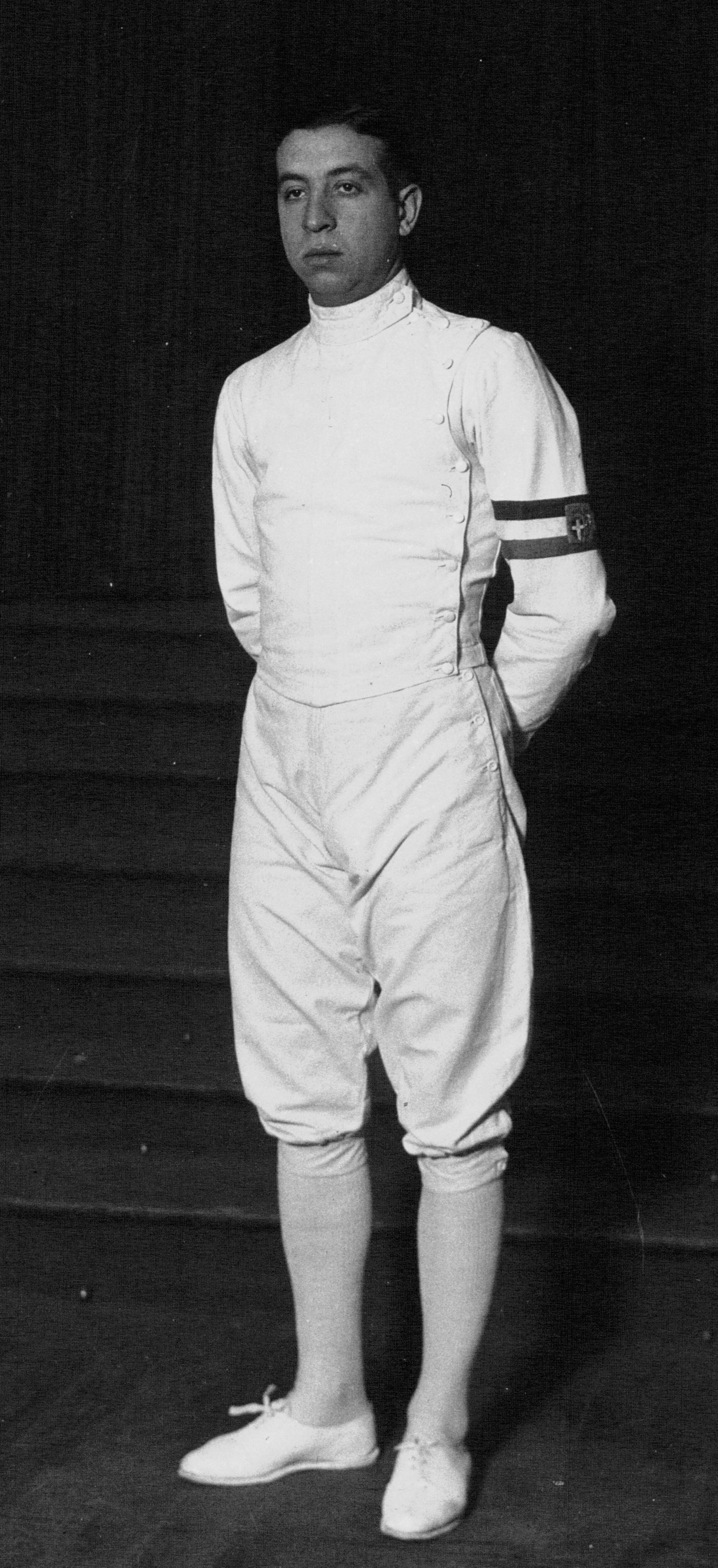
- Marzi in 1933

Personal information
- Born: 25 November 1908 Livorno, Italy
- Died: 14 November 1966 (aged 57) Trieste, Italy

Sport
- Sport: Fencing
- Event(s): Foil, sabre
Medal record
Representing Italy
Olympic Games
Silver medal – second place	1928 Amsterdam	Sabre team
Gold medal – first place	1932 Los Angeles	Foil individual
Silver medal – second place	1932 Los Angeles	Foil team
Silver medal – second place	1932 Los Angeles	Sabre team
Gold medal – first place	1936 Berlin	Foil team
Silver medal – second place	1936 Berlin	Sabre individual
Silver medal – second place	1936 Berlin	Sabre team

Gustavo Marzi (25 November 1908 – 14 November 1966) was an Italian fencer. He competed in foil and sabre events at the 1928, 1932 and 1936 Olympics and won a gold or silver medal in every event he entered, except for individual sabre in 1928, in which he finished fourth. In total, he won two gold and five silver medals.

At the world championships, which were unofficial through 1935, he won 10 titles: two in the individual foil (1935, 1937), seven in team foil (1929–31, 1934–35, 1937–38) and one in team sabre (1938). He died from a lung cancer, aged 57.

== See also ==
- Italy national fencing team – Multiple medallist
