= Edo Marion =

Yugoslav fencer (1910–2002)

Personal information
- Born: 12 April 1910 Ljubljana, Austria-Hungary
- Died: 1 December 2002 (aged 92) Boston, Massachusetts, United States

Sport
- Sport: Fencing

Edo Marion (1 April 1910 – 1 December 2002) was a Slovenian foil and sabre fencer. He competed in three events at the 1936 Summer Olympics.
