= Mirko Koršič =

Yugoslav fencer (1914–1981)

Personal information
- Born: 18 January 1914 Laibach, Austria-Hungary
- Died: 12 December 1981 (aged 67)

Sport
- Sport: Fencing

Mirko Koršič (18 January 1914 – 12 December 1981) was a Yugoslav fencer. He competed in the individual and team foil events at the 1936 Summer Olympics.
