= Erwin Casmir =

German fencer (1895–1982)

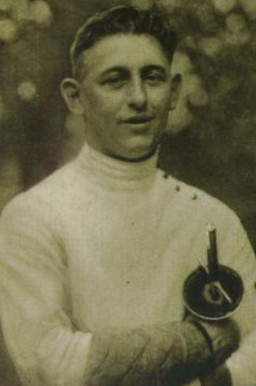

Personal information
- Born: 2 December 1895 Berlin, German Empire
- Died: 19 April 1982 (aged 86) Frankfurt, West Germany

Sport
- Sport: Fencing
Medal record
Men's fencing
Representing Germany
Olympic Games
Silver medal – second place	1928 Amsterdam	Foil, individual
Bronze medal – third place	1936 Berlin	Foil, team
Bronze medal – third place	1936 Berlin	Sabre, team

Erwin Casmir (2 December 1895 – 19 April 1982) was a German fencer. He won a silver medal at the 1928 Summer Olympics and two bronze medals at the 1936 Summer Olympics.
