= Ernest Dalton =

Canadian fencer (1885–1963)

Personal information
- Born: 17 August 1885 Toronto, Ontario, Canada
- Died: 12 April 1963 (aged 77) Toronto, Ontario, Canada

Sport
- Sport: Fencing

Ernest Alfred Dalton (17 August 1885 – 12 April 1963) was a Canadian fencer. He competed at the 1932 and 1936 Summer Olympics.
