= Rodolfo Valenzuela =

Argentine fencer

Personal information
- Born: 12 November 1904 San Pedro, Buenos Aires Province, Argentina
- Died: 5 March 1967 (aged 61) Monrovia, Montserrado, Liberia

Sport
- Sport: Fencing

Rodolfo Valenzuela (12 November 1904 – 5 March 1967) was an Argentine fencer. He competed in the individual and team foil events at the 1932 and 1936 Summer Olympics.
