= Roberto Larraz =

Argentine fencer

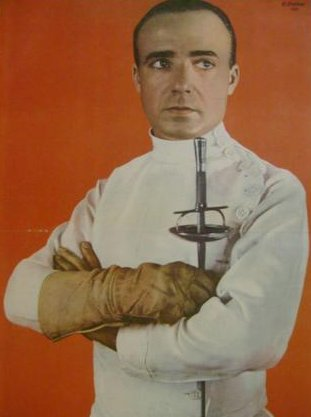

Personal information
- Born: 20 August 1898 Buenos Aires, Argentina
- Died: 27 November 1978 (aged 80) Buenos Aires, Argentina

Sport
- Sport: Fencing
Medal record
Men's fencing
Representing Argentina
Olympic Games
Bronze medal – third place	1928 Amsterdam	Foil, team

Roberto Larraz (20 August 1898 – 27 November 1978) was an Argentine fencer. He won a bronze medal in the team foil competition at the 1928 Summer Olympics.
