= Mahmoud Abdin =

Egyptian fencer (1906–1954)

Personal information
- Full name: Mahmoud Ahmed Abdin
- Nationality: Egyptian
- Born: 4 October 1906
- Died: 4 June 1954 (aged 47) Cairo, Egypt

Sport
- Country: Egypt
- Sport: Fencing
- Club: Cercle Royal d’Escrime

Mahmoud Ahmed Abdin (4 October 1906 – 4 June 1954) was an Egyptian épée and foil fencer. He competed at the 1928, 1936 and 1948 Summer Olympics. In 1928 he reached the first round in both Men's Foil Team and Individual, in 1936 he reached in foil individual the third round and with the team he lost in the first round. The same year he also competed in épée in which in individual he reached the first round and with the team the second. In 1948 he only competed in the men's foil team.
