= Joseph Levis =

American fencer (1905–2005)

Personal information
- Born: July 20, 1905 Boston, Massachusetts, United States
- Died: May 20, 2005 (aged 99) Brighton, Massachusetts, United States

Sport
- Sport: Fencing
Medal record
Men's fencing
Representing United States
Olympic Games
Silver medal – second place	1932 Los Angeles	Foil, individual
Bronze medal – third place	1932 Los Angeles	Foil, team

Joseph Levis (July 20, 1905, in Boston, MA – May 20, 2005) was an American foil fencer. He won nine national fencing championships, and participated in three Olympic Games representing the United States. The Roll of Honor at the US Fencing Hall of Fame (USFA) credits his individual Olympic silver medal in foil (1932) as the finest accomplishment ever by an American fencer and his victory in the 1954 nationals, after a 16-year layoff from competition, as the greatest comeback in the history of American fencing.

== Early life ==
Levis was an Italian-American, born and raised in Boston, Massachusetts, to Albert W. Levis, a painter and sculptor from Florence, Italy, and Rosa M. Finocchietti, daughter of Italian immigrants from Genoa and a prominent activist for the suffragette movement of the 1920s.

As a teenager, he first learned the basics of fencing from his father, who had won several championships in his home country of Italy. But it was not until Levis joined the fencing team at the Massachusetts Institute of Technology (MIT) in 1922 that he began to develop the skills that would lead him to greatness. Often during his career, Levis credited US Hall of Fame fencer George C. Calnan, his teammate at MIT, as his greatest influence and most important teacher. Under his tutelage, Levis won the Intercollegiate Fencing Championship in foil in 1926, after placing second the previous year.

== National fencing championships ==
Levis won nine individual National Championships conducted by the Amateur Fencers League of America (AFLA), including National Foil Championships in 1929, 1932, 1933, 1935, 1937, and 1954 and National Outdoor Foil Championships in 1929 and 1933. In addition, he also won the National Three-Weapon Championship in 1929.

== Olympic records ==
Levis participated in three Olympic Games; specifically, the 1928 Amsterdam, 1932 Los Angeles, and 1936 Berlin Olympics. He was captain of the 1936 team. In the 1932 Los Angeles Olympics, he won the silver medal in Individual Foil, defeating the famously tall (6 foot 7 inch) Giulio Gaudini of Italy in the crucial bout for the silver medal. In that same Olympics, he won the bronze medal in Team Foil alongside his mentor, George C. Calnan.

== Coaching career ==
Levis retired from competition in 1937 and became a fencing instructor for the MIT fencing team. He was named head coach of the team in 1939 and served in that capacity during two tenures, 1939–43 and 1946–49. His 1947 team finished undefeated in the regular season and won the Eastern Intercollegiate Team Championship.

== The Comeback ==
In 1949, Levis, desirous of competing seriously once again, applied to the AFLA for reinstatement as amateur (in the sport of fencing, professionals are not allowed to compete). Reinstatement was granted five years later, in 1954. On June 17, 1954, at the age of 48 and 16 years after last competing in a major competition, Levis won his ninth and last AFLA National Championship in the individual foil class. The accomplishment was hailed by some sportswriters of the era as one of the greatest comebacks in amateur sports history.

== Later years ==
After his final retirement from competitive fencing in 1955, Levis dedicated himself to what he loved most, teaching and developing young fencers, especially, at his alma mater. Until he was in his late eighties, he would spend many hours each week assisting the coaching staff at MIT in the training of its fencers.

He also became very proficient in ballroom dancing, winning with his wife, Yvonne, scores of amateur championships in his age class throughout the United States and Canada. He continued competing in dancing competitions until just a year before his death.

Levis died in his sleep on May 20, 2005, at age 99.

== Miscellaneous ==
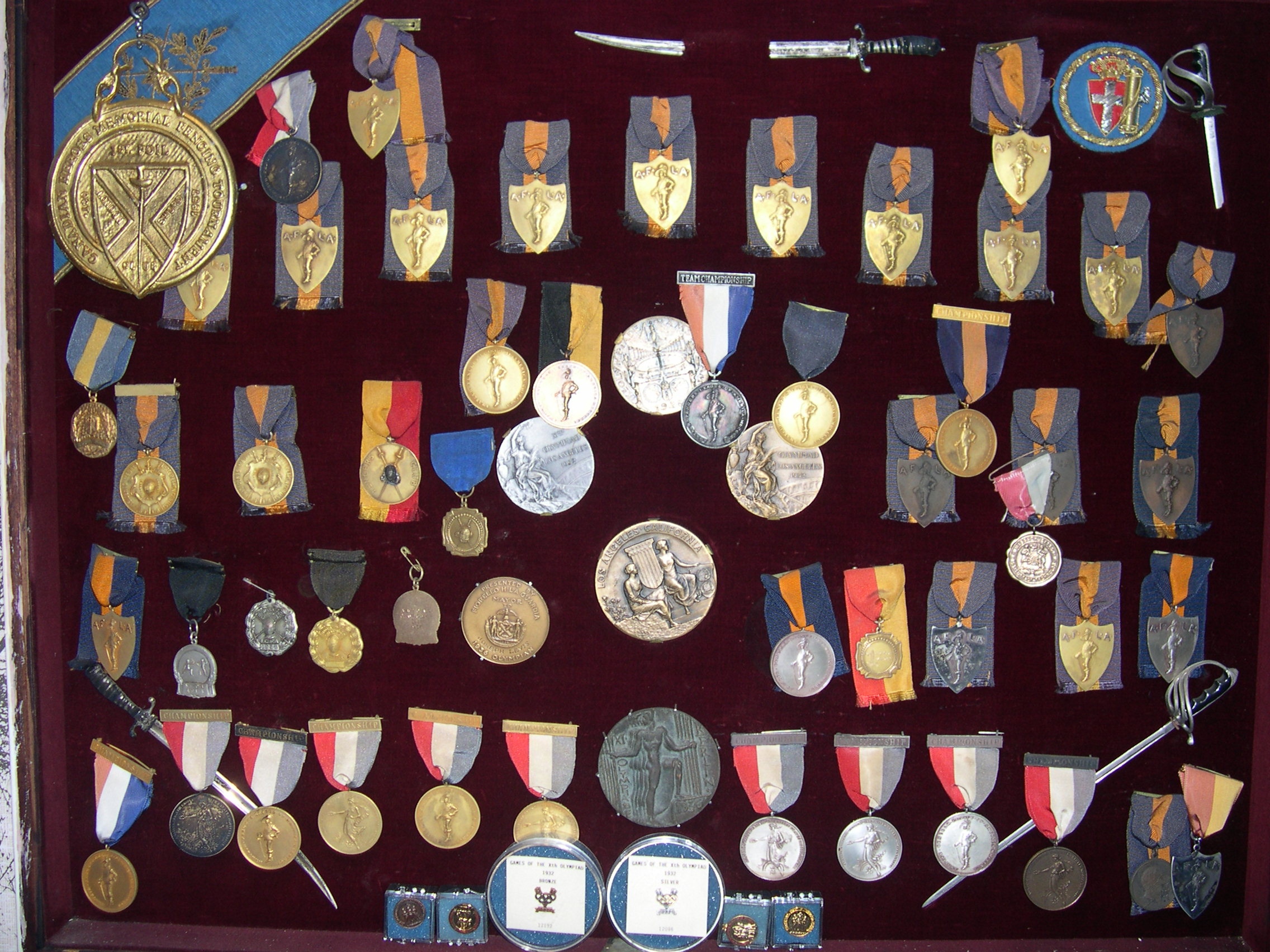
Medals won by Joseph Levis. 1932 Olympic silver and bronze medals at center of display

Levis received his civil engineering degree from MIT. He took over ownership of his father's marble-tile-terrazo business in Boston and, over the years, made it into the largest business of its kind in the New England area.

He developed a unique grip for his foil. He would replace the regular foil handle and pommel with a saber handle and pommel, which would be considerably shorter, and use adhesive tape to firmly secure the foil to his wrist. This handle system was known as the "Levis Grip". Levis attributed his success to the shorter, faster, stronger hand movements that the lighter Levis Grip would provide.

Levis' oldest son, Robert, is also an Olympian fencer, having competed in the 1972 Munich Olympics representing Puerto Rico.

== See also ==
- List of USFA Division I National Champions
- List of USFA Hall of Fame members
