= Gioacchino Guaragna =

Italian fencer (1908–1971)

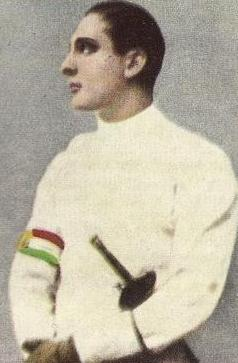

Personal information
- Born: 14 June 1908 Milan, Italy
- Died: 19 April 1971 (aged 62) Milan, Italy

Sport
- Sport: Fencing
Medal record
Men's fencing
Representing Italy
Olympic Games
Gold medal – first place	1928 Amsterdam	Foil, team
Silver medal – second place	1932 Los Angeles	Foil, team
Gold medal – first place	1936 Berlin	Foil, team

Gioacchino Guaragna (14 June 1908 – 19 April 1971) was an Italian fencer. He won two gold medals and a silver in the team foil event at three different Olympic games.
