= Ángel Gorordo =

Argentine fencer

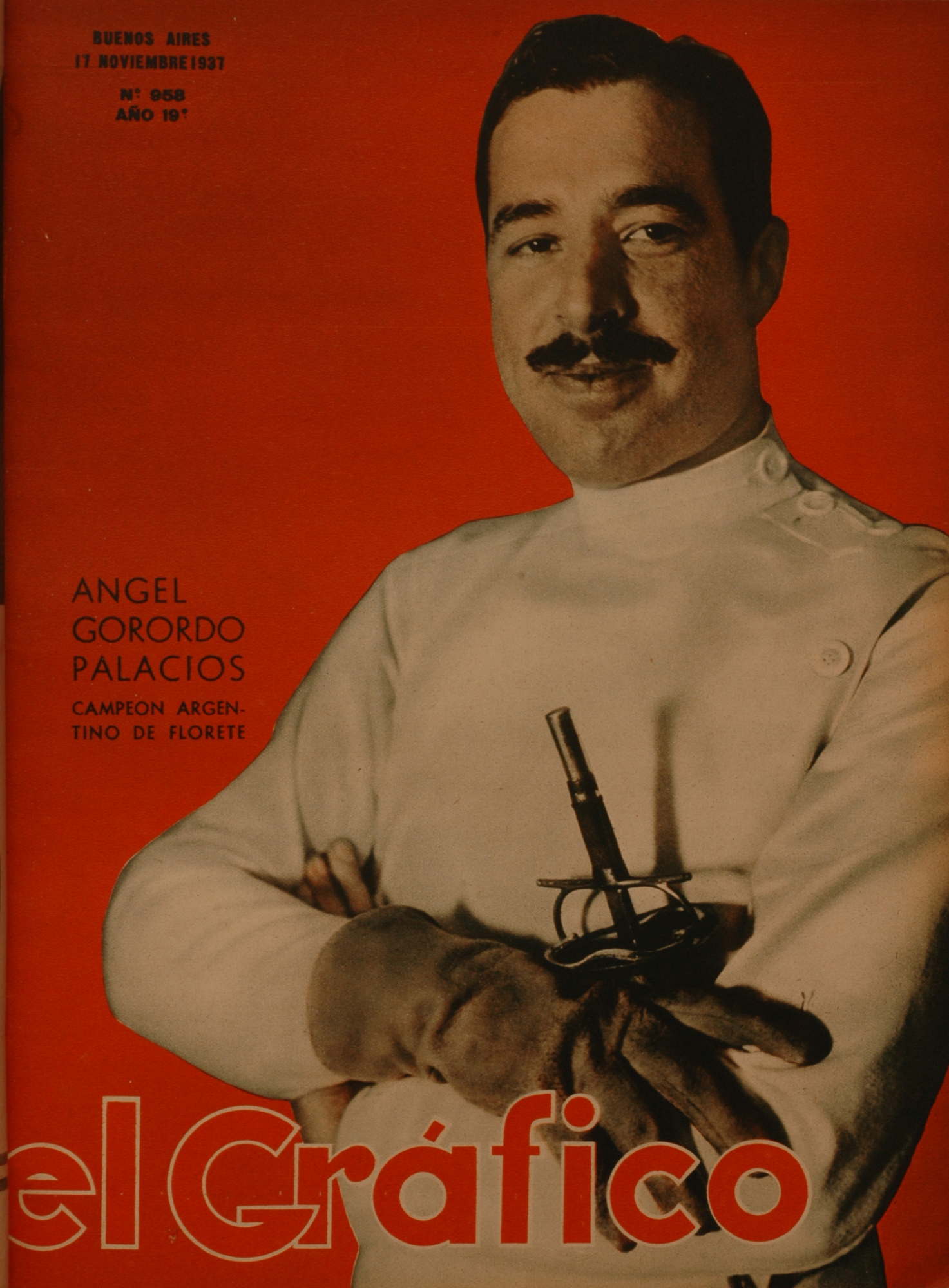

Personal information
- Born: 6 March 1904 Buenos Aires, Argentina
- Died: 12 June 1974 (aged 70)

Sport
- Sport: Fencing

Ángel Gorordo (6 March 1904 – 12 June 1974) was an Argentine fencer. He competed in the individual and team foil events at the 1932 and 1936 Summer Olympics.
