= Giulio Gaudini =

Italian fencer (1904–1948)

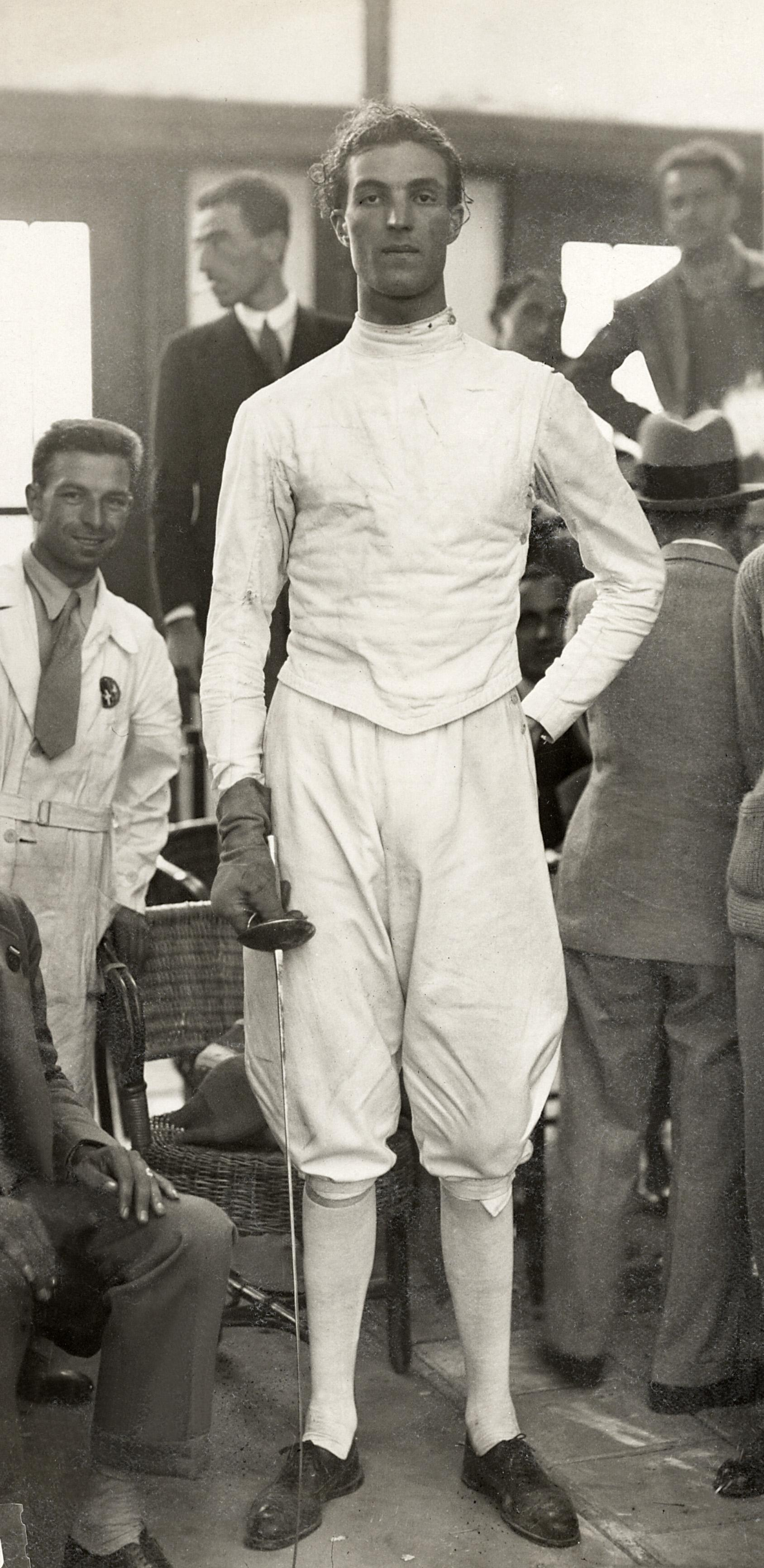
- Giulio Gaudini at the 1928 Olympics

Personal information
- Born: 28 September 1904 Rome, Italy
- Died: 6 January 1948 (aged 43) Rome, Italy
- Height: 2.00 m (6 ft 7 in)

Sport
- Sport: Fencing
Medal record
Representing Italy
Olympic Games
Gold medal – first place	1928 Amsterdam	Team foil
Bronze medal – third place	1928 Amsterdam	Individual foil
Silver medal – second place	1932 Los Angeles	Team foil
Silver medal – second place	1932 Los Angeles	Team sabre
Silver medal – second place	1932 Los Angeles	Individual sabre
Bronze medal – third place	1932 Los Angeles	Individual foil
Gold medal – first place	1936 Berlin	Individual foil
Gold medal – first place	1936 Berlin	Team foil
Silver medal – second place	1936 Berlin	Team sabre
World Fencing Championships
Gold medal – first place	1929 Naples	Team foil
Bronze medal – third place	1929 Naples	Individual foil
Gold medal – first place	1930 Liège	Team foil
Gold medal – first place	1930 Liège	Individual foil
Silver medal – second place	1930 Liège	Team sabre
Gold medal – first place	1931 Vienna	Team foil
Silver medal – second place	1931 Vienna	Team sabre
Silver medal – second place	1933 Budapest	Individual foil
Silver medal – second place	1933 Budapest	Team sabre
Bronze medal – third place	1933 Budapest	Individual sabre
Gold medal – first place	1934 Warsaw	Team foil
Silver medal – second place	1934 Warsaw	Team sabre
Silver medal – second place	1934 Warsaw	Individual sabre
Gold medal – first place	1934 Warsaw	Individual foil
Gold medal – first place	1935 Lausanne	Team foil
Silver medal – second place	1935 Lausanne	Team sabre
Gold medal – first place	1938 Piešťany	Team sabre

Giulio Gaudini (28 September 1904 – 6 January 1948) was an Italian foil and sabre fencer. He competed at the 1924, 1928, 1932 and 1936 Olympics and won three gold, four silver, and two bronze medals. He was the flag bearer for Italy at the 1936 Games. At the world championships, he earned 17 medals between 1929 and 1938. He died of cancer, aged 43.

== See also ==
- Legends of Italian sport - Walk of Fame
- List of multiple Olympic medalists
- Italy national fencing team – Multiple medallist
- List of multiple Summer Olympic medalists

Summer Olympics
Preceded by Ugo Frigerio	Flag bearer for Italy; 1936 Berlin	Succeeded by Gianni Rocca
