= List of Wrestling Observer Newsletter awards =

This is a list of both active and inactive Wrestling Observer Newsletter awards created by professional wrestling and mixed martial arts (MMA) journalist Dave Meltzer. The first fourteen awards were created in 1980 as an informal poll between Meltzer and his friends and others he corresponded with on the subject of professional wrestling at the time. After starting the Wrestling Observer in 1982, the awards took on a greater life, with an increasing number of awards given out every year.

The awards were created to recognize the individual achievements of a select few wrestlers who exemplified a specified criterion. The awards are given every year in various categories such as Wrestler of the Year, Most Outstanding Wrestler, Tag Team of the Year, Most Improved, Pro Wrestling Match of the Year, etc.; there are also a handful of awards to recognize the dubious distinctions in the business during that year such as Most Overrated and Worst Match. There are currently forty-five categories that are actively assessed every year and twenty that are no longer active. The awards are voted for by the newsletter's paying readership, primarily wrestling fans, although it is claimed that some industry workers also vote.

The awards are organized into two categories. For "Category A" awards, voters indicate their top three choices. First choices are awarded five points, second places three points, and third places two points. The choice with the most points overall wins. For "Category B" awards, voters simply indicate their top choice. For the "Category B" Shad Gaspard/Jon Huber Memorial Award, the recipients are chosen by a committee headed by Meltzer.

Over the years, various MMA promotions or individual mixed martial artists were deemed eligible to win some awards when it seemed as though they were more deserving to win than the conventional wrestler or wrestling promotion. This led to, in 1997, the creation of Shootfighter of the Year and Shoot Match of the Year to recognize MMA achievement specifically. Still, some primarily professional wrestling-focused awards remained intact for MMA promotions/fighters to win, due to the similar business aspect between both sports (i.e. Best Box Office Draw and Promotion of the Year). In the December 3, 2007 edition of the Wrestling Observer Newsletter, it was announced that from that year onwards, mixed martial artists are no longer eligible for the Lou Thesz/Ric Flair Award, thus reserving it for professional wrestlers only. Shootfighter of the Year was renamed to Most Outstanding Fighter and Shoot Match of the Year was renamed to MMA Match of the Year to match a new award called Mixed Martial Arts Most Valuable, which is similar to the Lou Thesz/Ric Flair Award except it is for mixed martial artists.

== Current awards ==
=== "Category A" awards ===
==== Lou Thesz/Ric Flair Award (Wrestler of the Year) ====
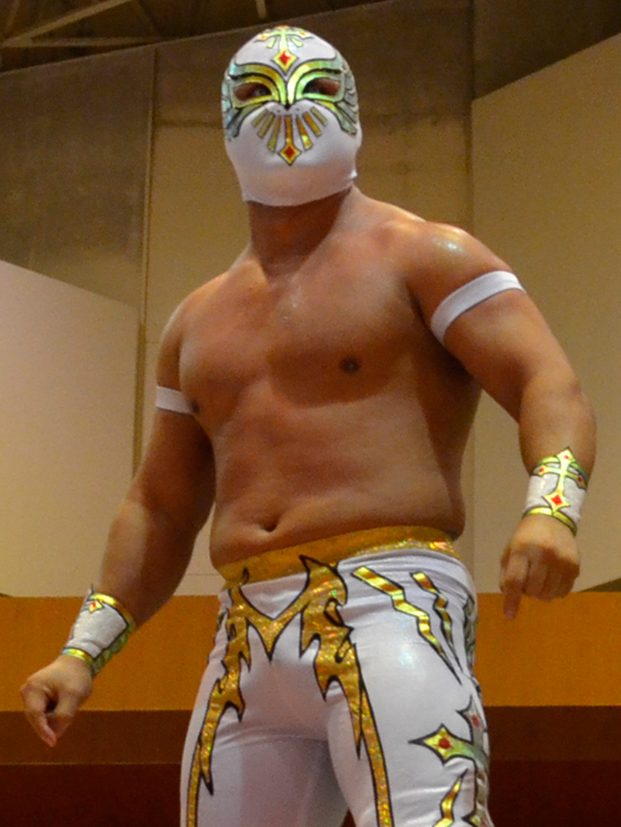
Místico is the most recent winner of the award in 2025, his second after winning in 2006.

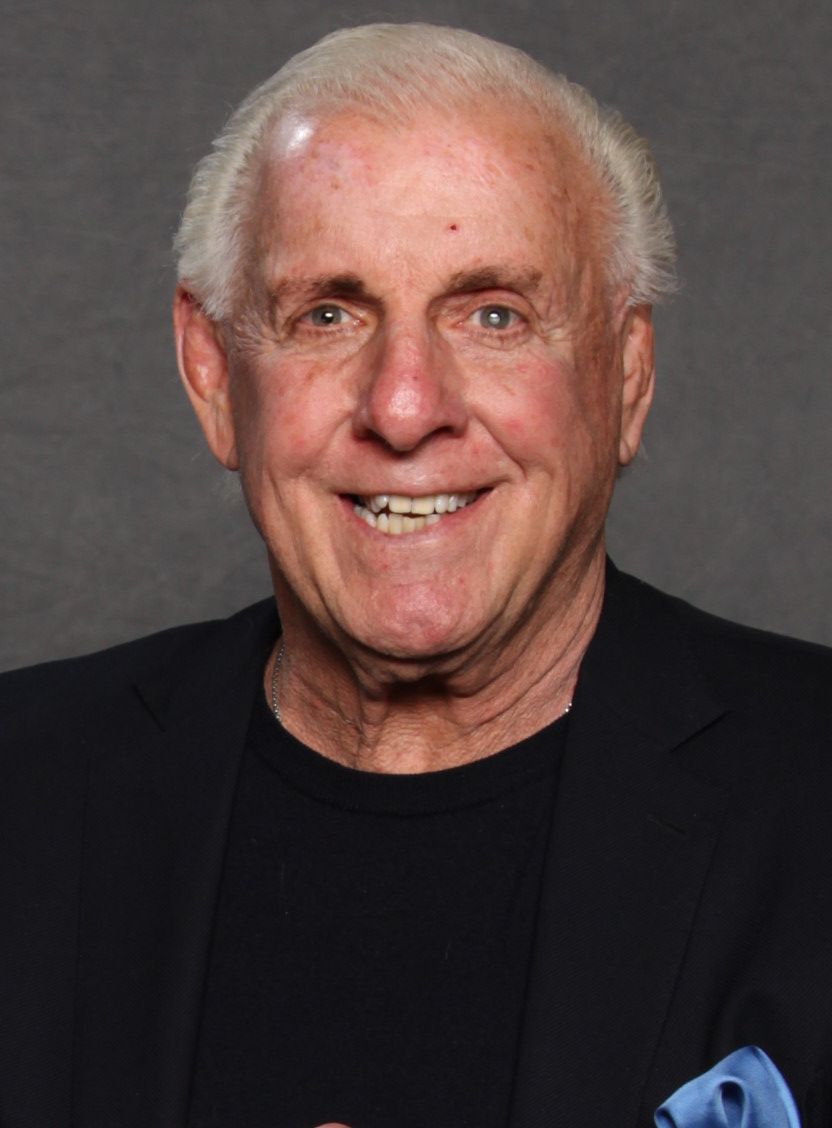
Ric Flair is a nine-time winner and co-namesake of the category.

Year	Wrestler	Promotion(s)
1980	Harley Race	National Wrestling Alliance
1981	Ric Flair	National Wrestling Alliance
1982	Ric Flair	National Wrestling Alliance
1983	Ric Flair	National Wrestling Alliance
1984	Ric Flair	National Wrestling Alliance
1985	Ric Flair	Jim Crockett Promotions
1986	Ric Flair	Jim Crockett Promotions
1987	Riki Choshu	New Japan Pro-Wrestling; All Japan Pro Wrestling
1988	Akira Maeda	Universal Wrestling Federation
1989	Ric Flair	World Championship Wrestling
1990	Ric Flair	World Championship Wrestling
1991	Jumbo Tsuruta	All Japan Pro Wrestling
1992	Ric Flair	World Wrestling Federation
1993	Big Van Vader	World Championship Wrestling
1994	Toshiaki Kawada	All Japan Pro Wrestling
1995	Mitsuharu Misawa	All Japan Pro Wrestling
1996	Kenta Kobashi	All Japan Pro Wrestling
1997	Mitsuharu Misawa	All Japan Pro Wrestling
1998	Stone Cold Steve Austin	World Wrestling Federation
1999	Mitsuharu Misawa	All Japan Pro Wrestling
2000	Triple H	World Wrestling Federation
2001	Keiji Muto	New Japan Pro-Wrestling
2002	Kurt Angle	World Wrestling Entertainment
2003	Kenta Kobashi	Pro Wrestling Noah
2004	Kenta Kobashi	Pro Wrestling Noah
2005	Kenta Kobashi	Pro Wrestling Noah
2006	Místico	Consejo Mundial de Lucha Libre
2007	John Cena	World Wrestling Entertainment
2008	Chris Jericho	World Wrestling Entertainment
2009	Chris Jericho	World Wrestling Entertainment
2010	John Cena	World Wrestling Entertainment
2011	Hiroshi Tanahashi	New Japan Pro-Wrestling
2012	Hiroshi Tanahashi	New Japan Pro-Wrestling
2013	Hiroshi Tanahashi	New Japan Pro-Wrestling
2014	Shinsuke Nakamura	New Japan Pro-Wrestling
2015	AJ Styles	New Japan Pro-Wrestling; Ring of Honor
2016	AJ Styles	WWE
2017	Kazuchika Okada	New Japan Pro-Wrestling
2018	Kenny Omega	New Japan Pro-Wrestling; Ring of Honor
2019	Chris Jericho	New Japan Pro-Wrestling; All Elite Wrestling
2020	Jon Moxley	New Japan Pro-Wrestling; All Elite Wrestling
2021	Kenny Omega	All Elite Wrestling; Impact Wrestling
2022	Jon Moxley	All Elite Wrestling
2023	Will Ospreay	New Japan Pro-Wrestling
2024	Cody Rhodes	WWE
2025	Místico	Consejo Mundial de Lucha Libre

==== Mixed Martial Arts Most Valuable ====
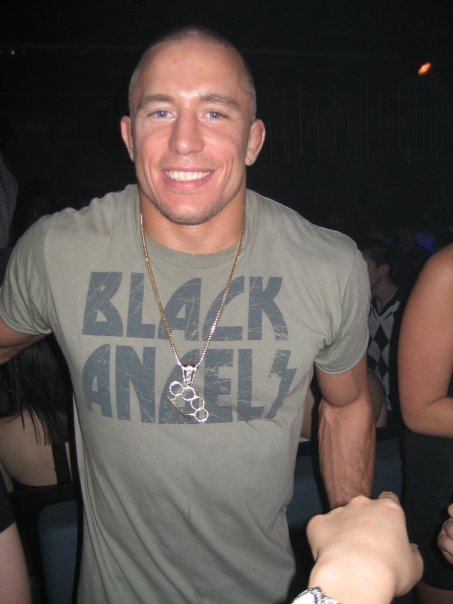
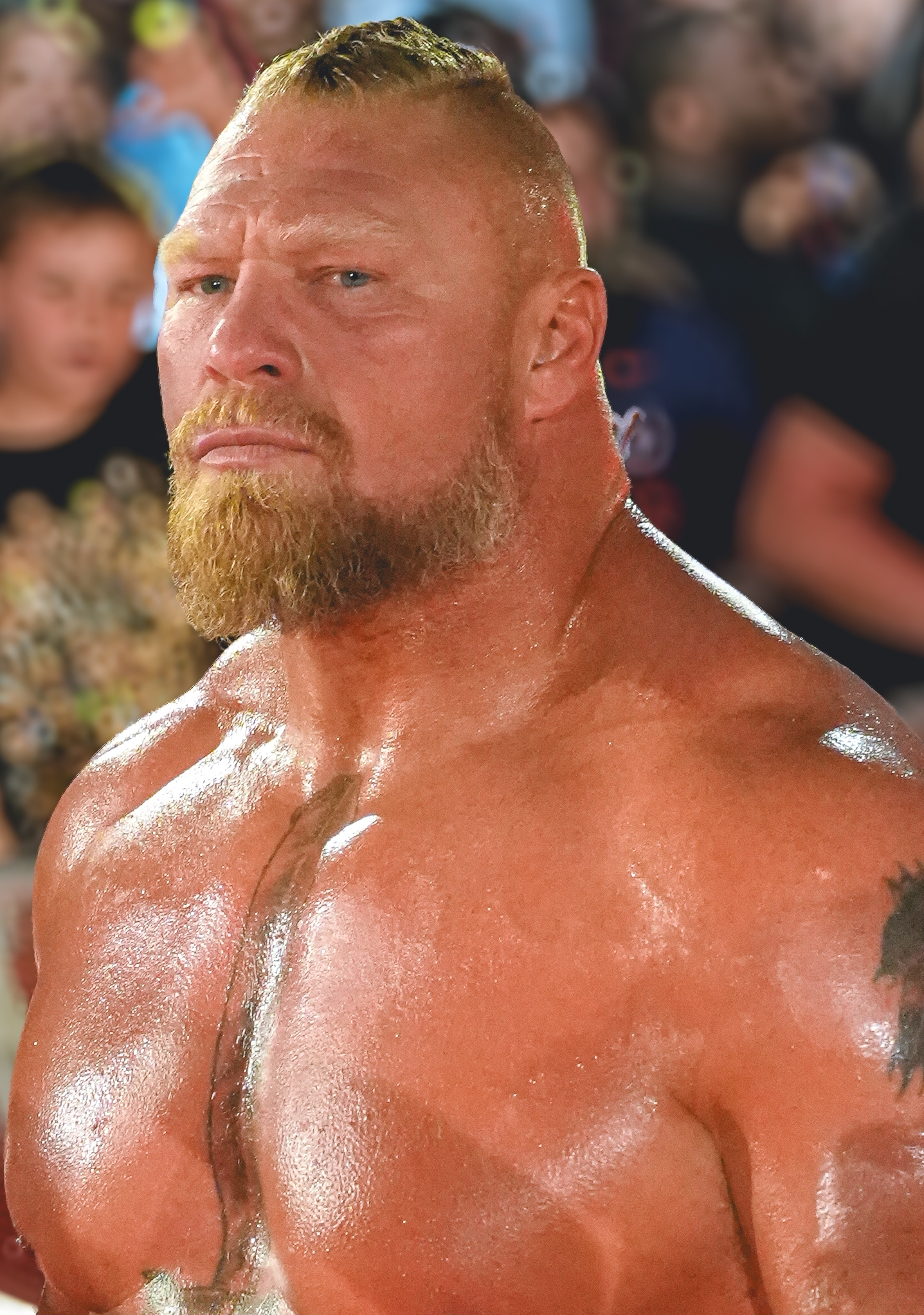
Georges St-Pierre and Brock Lesnar are three-time winners of the category.

Year	Fighter	Promotion(s)
2007	Randy Couture	Ultimate Fighting Championship
2008	Brock Lesnar	Ultimate Fighting Championship
2009	Brock Lesnar	Ultimate Fighting Championship
2010	Brock Lesnar	Ultimate Fighting Championship
2011	Georges St-Pierre	Ultimate Fighting Championship
2012	Anderson Silva	Ultimate Fighting Championship
2013	Georges St-Pierre	Ultimate Fighting Championship
2014	Ronda Rousey	Ultimate Fighting Championship
2015	Ronda Rousey	Ultimate Fighting Championship
2016	Conor McGregor	Ultimate Fighting Championship
2017	Georges St-Pierre	Ultimate Fighting Championship
2018	Conor McGregor	Ultimate Fighting Championship
2019	Jorge Masvidal	Ultimate Fighting Championship
2020	Khabib Nurmagomedov	Ultimate Fighting Championship
2021	Kamaru Usman	Ultimate Fighting Championship
2022	Israel Adesanya	Ultimate Fighting Championship
2023	Jon Jones	Ultimate Fighting Championship
2024	Alex Pereira	Ultimate Fighting Championship
2025	Islam Makhachev	Ultimate Fighting Championship

==== Most Outstanding Wrestler ====
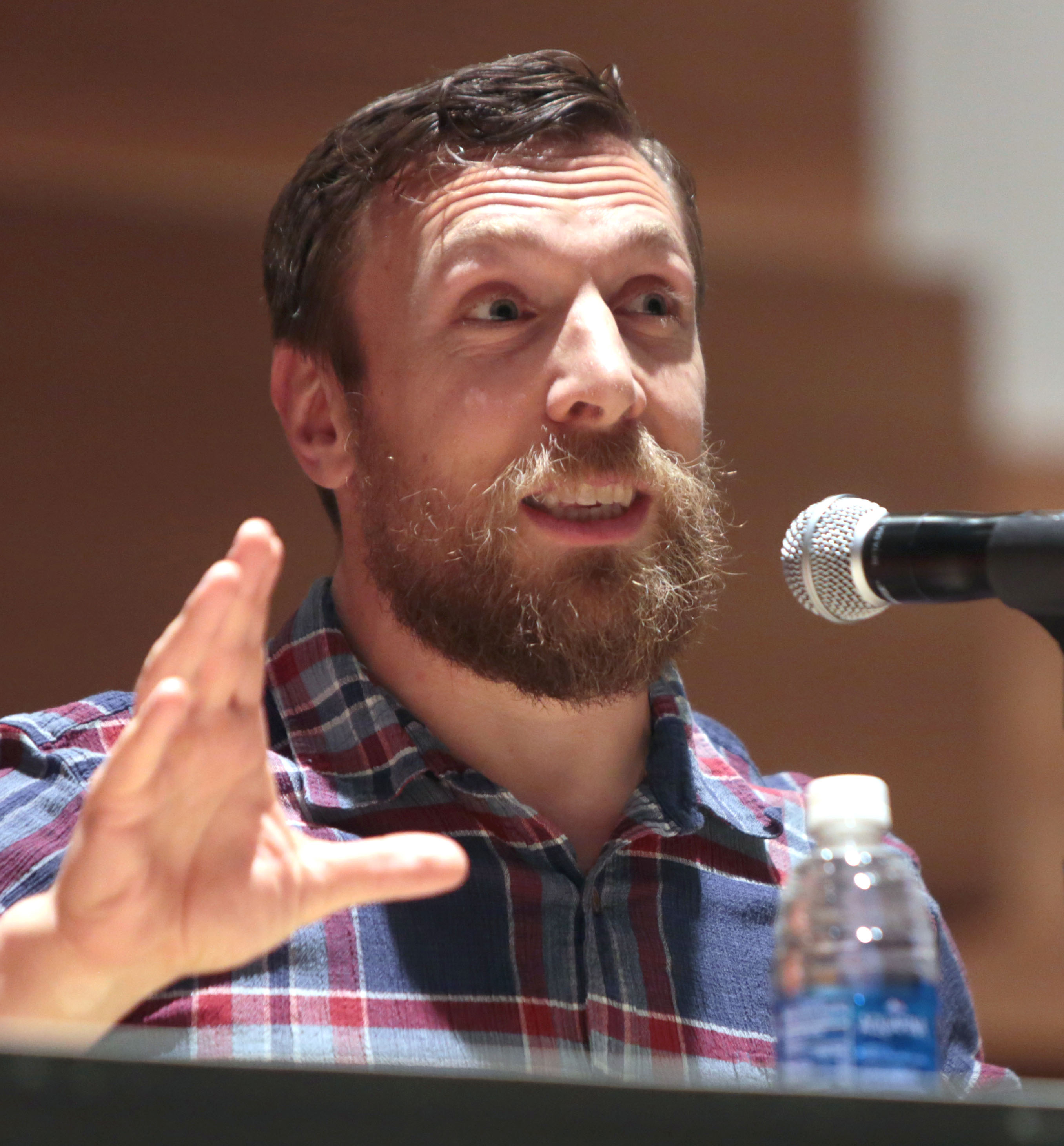
Bryan Danielson/Daniel Bryan is a record five-time winner of the category.

Year	Wrestler	Promotion
1986	Ric Flair	Jim Crockett Promotions
1987	Ric Flair	Jim Crockett Promotions
1988	Tatsumi Fujinami	New Japan Pro-Wrestling
1989	Ric Flair	World Championship Wrestling
1990	Jushin Thunder Liger	New Japan Pro-Wrestling
1991	Jushin Thunder Liger	New Japan Pro-Wrestling; World Championship Wrestling
1992	Jushin Thunder Liger	New Japan Pro-Wrestling; World Championship Wrestling
1993	Kenta Kobashi	All Japan Pro Wrestling
1994	Kenta Kobashi	All Japan Pro Wrestling
1995	Manami Toyota	All Japan Women's Pro-Wrestling
1996	Rey Misterio Jr.	Extreme Championship Wrestling; World Championship Wrestling
1997	Mitsuharu Misawa	All Japan Pro Wrestling
1998	Koji Kanemoto	New Japan Pro-Wrestling
1999	Mitsuharu Misawa	All Japan Pro Wrestling
2000	Chris Benoit	World Championship Wrestling; World Wrestling Federation
2001	Kurt Angle	World Wrestling Federation/Entertainment
2002	Kurt Angle	World Wrestling Federation/Entertainment
2003	Kurt Angle	World Wrestling Federation/Entertainment
2004	Chris Benoit	World Wrestling Federation/Entertainment
2005	Samoa Joe	Ring of Honor; Total Nonstop Action Wrestling
2006	Bryan Danielson/Daniel Bryan	Ring of Honor
2007	Bryan Danielson/Daniel Bryan	Ring of Honor
2008	Bryan Danielson/Daniel Bryan	Ring of Honor
2009	Bryan Danielson/Daniel Bryan	Dragon Gate USA; Ring of Honor
2010	Bryan Danielson/Daniel Bryan	Chikara; Dragon Gate USA; Evolve; World Wrestling Entertainment
2011	Davey Richards	Pro Wrestling Guerrilla; Ring of Honor
2012	Hiroshi Tanahashi	New Japan Pro-Wrestling
2013	Hiroshi Tanahashi	New Japan Pro-Wrestling
2014	AJ Styles	New Japan Pro-Wrestling; Ring of Honor
2015	AJ Styles	New Japan Pro-Wrestling; Ring of Honor
2016	AJ Styles	WWE
2017	Kazuchika Okada	New Japan Pro-Wrestling
2018	Kenny Omega	New Japan Pro-Wrestling
2019	Will Ospreay	New Japan Pro-Wrestling
2020	Kenny Omega	All Elite Wrestling; Lucha Libre AAA Worldwide
2021	Shingo Takagi	New Japan Pro-Wrestling
2022	Will Ospreay	New Japan Pro-Wrestling
2023	Will Ospreay	New Japan Pro-Wrestling
2024	Will Ospreay	New Japan Pro-Wrestling; All Elite Wrestling
2025	Konosuke Takeshita	All Elite Wrestling; New Japan Pro-Wrestling; DDT Pro-Wrestling

==== Most Outstanding Fighter of the Year ====
Note: Was known as "Shootfighter of the Year" until 2008.

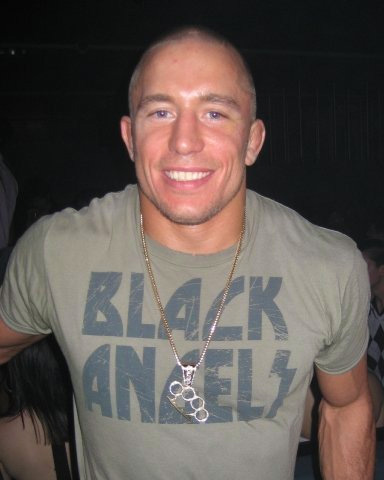
Georges St-Pierre is a three-time winner of the category.

Year	Fighter	Promotion(s)
1997	Maurice Smith	Ultimate Fighting Championship
1998	Frank Shamrock	Ultimate Fighting Championship
1999	Frank Shamrock	Ultimate Fighting Championship
2000	Kazushi Sakuraba	Pride Fighting Championships
2001	Wanderlei Silva	Pride Fighting Championships
2002	Antônio Rodrigo Nogueira	Pride Fighting Championships
2003	Randy Couture	Ultimate Fighting Championship
2004	Wanderlei Silva	Pride Fighting Championships
2005	Fedor Emelianenko	Pride Fighting Championships
2006	Mirko Filipović	Pride Fighting Championships
2007	Quinton Jackson	Ultimate Fighting Championship
2008	Georges St-Pierre	Ultimate Fighting Championship
2009	Georges St-Pierre	Ultimate Fighting Championship
2010	Georges St-Pierre	Ultimate Fighting Championship
2011	Jon Jones	Ultimate Fighting Championship
2012	Anderson Silva	Ultimate Fighting Championship
2013	Cain Velasquez	Ultimate Fighting Championship
2014	Ronda Rousey	Ultimate Fighting Championship
2015	Conor McGregor	Ultimate Fighting Championship
2016	Conor McGregor	Ultimate Fighting Championship
2017	Demetrious Johnson	Ultimate Fighting Championship
2018	Daniel Cormier	Ultimate Fighting Championship
2019	Israel Adesanya	Ultimate Fighting Championship
2020	Israel Adesanya	Ultimate Fighting Championship
2021	Kamaru Usman	Ultimate Fighting Championship
2022	Alexander Volkanovski	Ultimate Fighting Championship
2023	Islam Makhachev	Ultimate Fighting Championship
2024	Alex Pereira	Ultimate Fighting Championship
2025	Islam Makhachev	Ultimate Fighting Championship

==== Tag Team of the Year ====
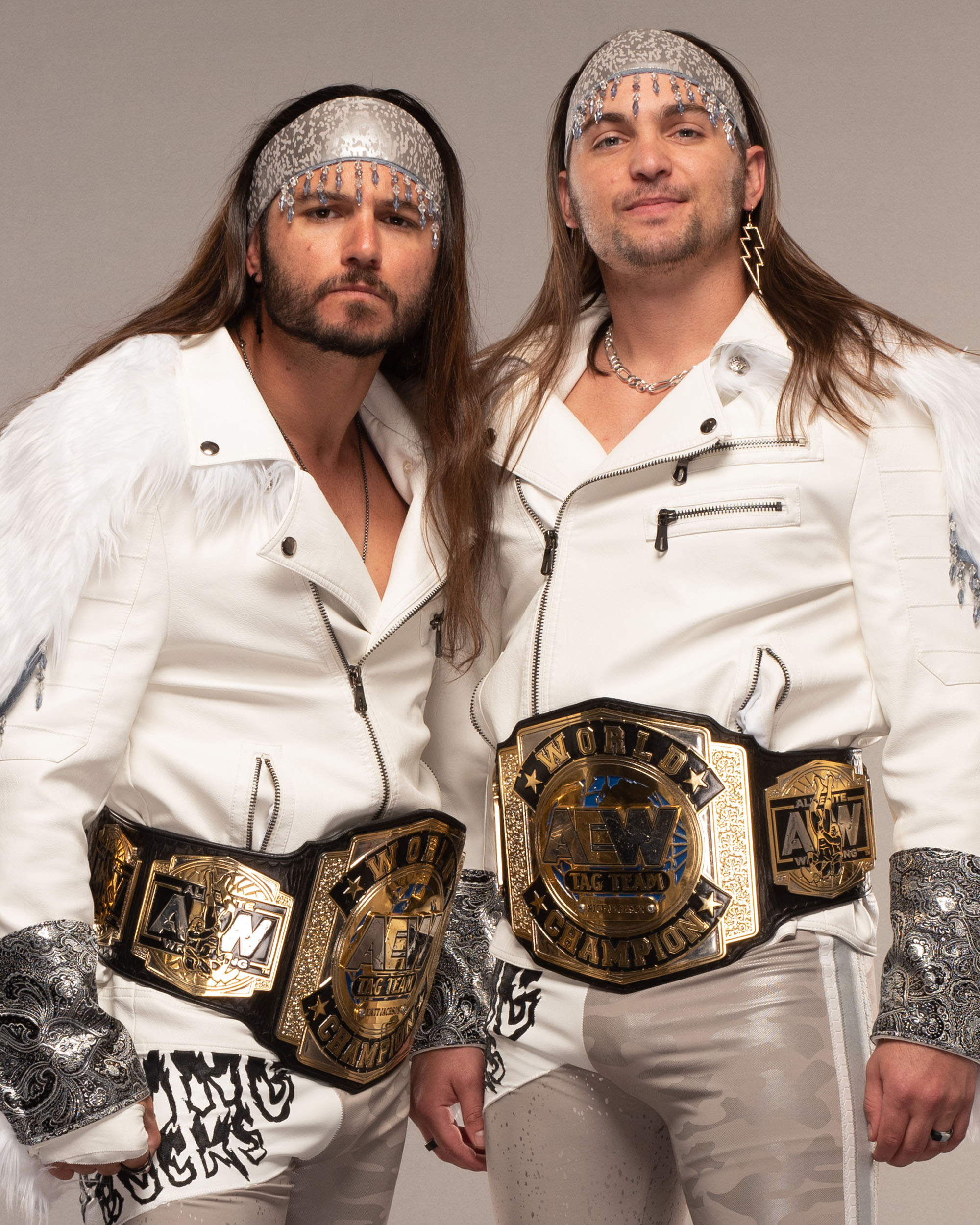
The Young Bucks are the record nine-time winners of the category.

Year	Tag Team	Promotion(s)
1980	The Fabulous Freebirds (Terry Gordy and Buddy Roberts)	Mid-South Wrestling; Georgia Championship Wrestling
1981	Jimmy Snuka and Terry Gordy	All Japan Pro Wrestling; National Wrestling Alliance
1982	Stan Hansen and Ole Anderson	National Wrestling Alliance
1983	Ricky Steamboat and Jay Youngblood	Jim Crockett Promotions
1984	The Road Warriors (Hawk and Animal)	American Wrestling Association; National Wrestling Alliance
1985	The British Bulldogs (Dynamite Kid and Davey Boy Smith)	World Wrestling Federation; All Japan Pro Wrestling; Stampede Wrestling
1986	The Midnight Express (Dennis Condrey and Bobby Eaton)	Universal Wrestling Federation
1987	The Midnight Express (Bobby Eaton and Stan Lane)	Universal Wrestling Federation; Jim Crockett Promotions
1988	The Midnight Express (Bobby Eaton and Stan Lane)	Jim Crockett Promotions
1989	The Rockers (Shawn Michaels and Marty Jannetty)	World Wrestling Federation
1990	The Steiner Brothers (Rick Steiner and Scott Steiner)	World Championship Wrestling
1991	Mitsuharu Misawa and Toshiaki Kawada	All Japan Pro Wrestling
1992	The Miracle Violence Connection (Terry Gordy and Steve Williams)	All Japan Pro Wrestling; World Championship Wrestling
1993	The Hollywood Blonds (Steve Austin and Brian Pillman)	World Championship Wrestling
1994	La Pareja del Terror (Eddy Guerrero and Art Barr)	Asistencia Asesoría y Administración
1995	Mitsuharu Misawa and Kenta Kobashi	All Japan Pro Wrestling
1996	Mitsuharu Misawa and Jun Akiyama	All Japan Pro Wrestling
1997	Mitsuharu Misawa and Jun Akiyama	All Japan Pro Wrestling
1998	Shinjiro Otani and Tatsuhito Takaiwa	New Japan Pro-Wrestling
1999	Kenta Kobashi and Jun Akiyama	All Japan Pro Wrestling
2000	Edge and Christian	World Wrestling Federation
2001	Tencozy (Satoshi Kojima and Hiroyoshi Tenzan)	New Japan Pro-Wrestling
2002	Los Guerreros (Eddie Guerrero and Chavo Guerrero)	World Wrestling Federation/Entertainment
2003	Kenta and Naomichi Marufuji	Pro Wrestling Noah
2004	Kenta and Naomichi Marufuji	Pro Wrestling Noah
2005	America's Most Wanted (Chris Harris and James Storm)	Total Nonstop Action Wrestling
2006	The Latin American Exchange (Homicide and Hernandez)	Total Nonstop Action Wrestling
2007	The Briscoe Brothers (Jay Briscoe and Mark Briscoe)	Ring of Honor
2008	John Morrison and The Miz	World Wrestling Entertainment
2009	The American Wolves (Davey Richards and Eddie Edwards)	Ring of Honor
2010	The Kings of Wrestling (Chris Hero and Claudio Castagnoli)	Ring of Honor
2011	Bad Intentions (Giant Bernard and Karl Anderson)	New Japan Pro-Wrestling
2012	Bad Influence (Christopher Daniels and Kazarian)	Total Nonstop Action Wrestling
2013	The Shield (Seth Rollins and Roman Reigns)	WWE
2014	The Young Bucks (Matt Jackson and Nick Jackson)	New Japan Pro-Wrestling; Pro Wrestling Guerrilla; Ring of Honor
2015	The Young Bucks (Matt Jackson and Nick Jackson)	New Japan Pro-Wrestling; Pro Wrestling Guerrilla; Ring of Honor
2016	The Young Bucks (Matt Jackson and Nick Jackson)	New Japan Pro-Wrestling; Pro Wrestling Guerrilla; Ring of Honor
2017	The Young Bucks (Matt Jackson and Nick Jackson)	New Japan Pro-Wrestling; Pro Wrestling Guerrilla; Ring of Honor
2018	The Young Bucks (Matt Jackson and Nick Jackson)	New Japan Pro-Wrestling; Pro Wrestling Guerrilla; Ring of Honor
2019	Lucha Brothers (Pentagón Jr. and Rey Fénix)	All Elite Wrestling; Impact Wrestling; Lucha Libre AAA Worldwide
2020	The Young Bucks (Matt Jackson and Nick Jackson)	All Elite Wrestling
2021	The Young Bucks (Matt Jackson and Nick Jackson)	All Elite Wrestling
2022	FTR (Cash Wheeler and Dax Harwood)	All Elite Wrestling; Ring of Honor
2023	FTR (Cash Wheeler and Dax Harwood)	All Elite Wrestling; Ring of Honor
2024	The Young Bucks (Matt Jackson and Nick Jackson)	All Elite Wrestling
2025	The Young Bucks (Matt Jackson and Nick Jackson)	All Elite Wrestling

==== Best on Interviews ====
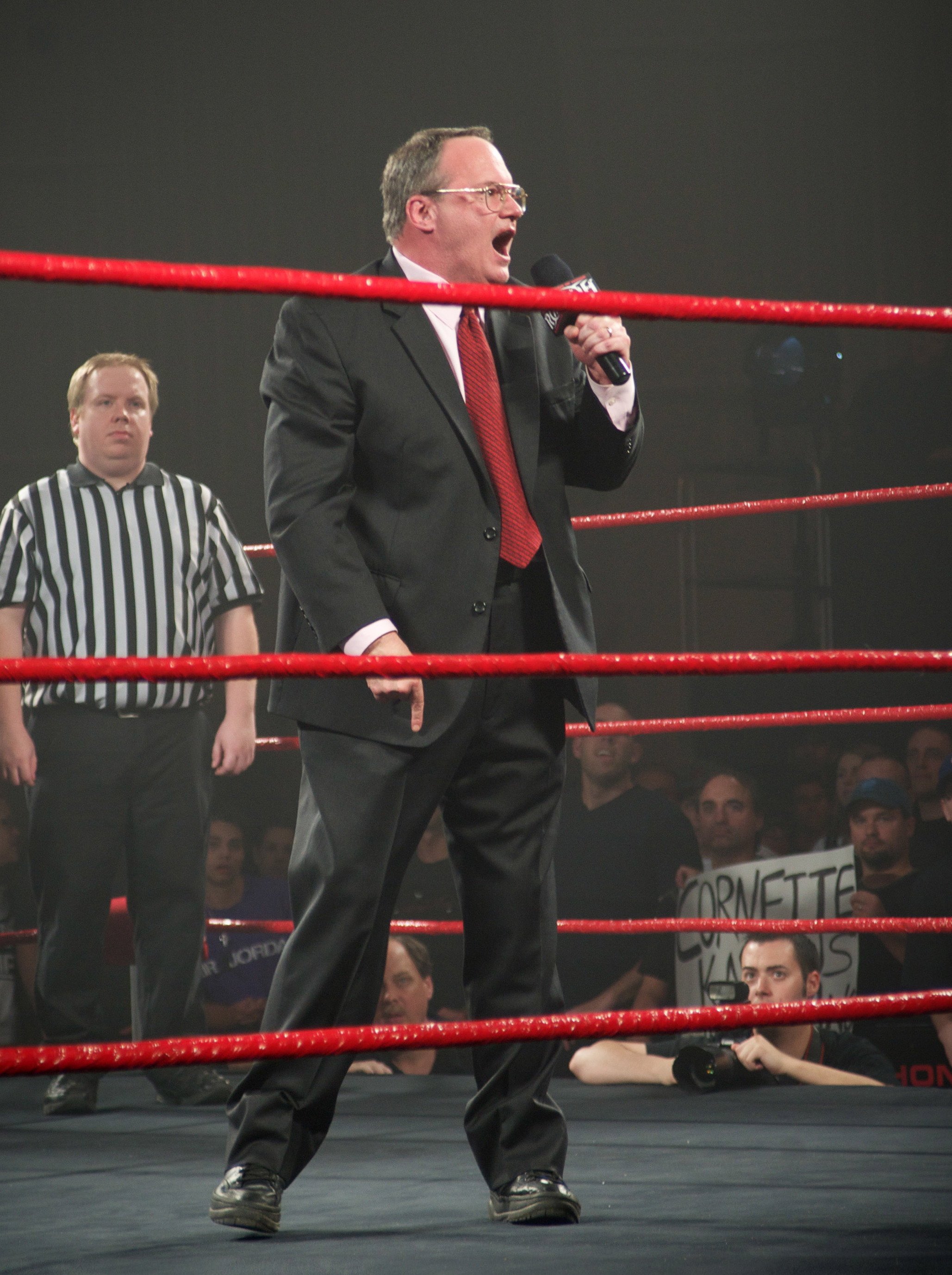
Jim Cornette is a record five-time winner of the category.

Year	Performer	Promotion(s)
1981	Lou Albano	World Wrestling Federation
1981	Roddy Piper	National Wrestling Alliance
1982	Roddy Piper	National Wrestling Alliance
1983	Roddy Piper	National Wrestling Alliance
1984	Jimmy Hart	Continental Wrestling Association
1985	Jim Cornette	Mid-South Wrestling; World Class Championship Wrestling
1986	Jim Cornette	Jim Crockett Promotions
1987	Jim Cornette	Jim Crockett Promotions
1988	Jim Cornette	Jim Crockett Promotions
1989	Terry Funk	World Championship Wrestling
1990	Arn Anderson	World Championship Wrestling
1991	Ric Flair	World Championship Wrestling
1992	Ric Flair	World Wrestling Federation
1993	Jim Cornette	Smoky Mountain Wrestling
1994	Ric Flair	World Championship Wrestling
1995	Cactus Jack	Extreme Championship Wrestling
1996	Stone Cold Steve Austin	World Wrestling Federation/Entertainment
1997	Stone Cold Steve Austin	World Wrestling Federation/Entertainment
1998	Stone Cold Steve Austin	World Wrestling Federation/Entertainment
1999	The Rock	World Wrestling Federation/Entertainment
2000	The Rock	World Wrestling Federation/Entertainment
2001	Stone Cold Steve Austin	World Wrestling Federation/Entertainment
2002	Kurt Angle	World Wrestling Federation/Entertainment
2003	Chris Jericho	World Wrestling Federation/Entertainment
2004	Mick Foley	World Wrestling Entertainment; Hustle; Ring of Honor
2005	Eddie Guerrero	World Wrestling Entertainment
2006	Mick Foley	World Wrestling Entertainment
2007	John Cena	World Wrestling Entertainment
2008	Chris Jericho	World Wrestling Entertainment
2009	Chris Jericho	World Wrestling Entertainment
2010	Chael Sonnen	Ultimate Fighting Championship
2011	CM Punk	WWE
2012	CM Punk	WWE
2013	Paul Heyman	WWE
2014	Paul Heyman	WWE
2015	Conor McGregor	Ultimate Fighting Championship
2016	Conor McGregor	Ultimate Fighting Championship
2017	Conor McGregor	Ultimate Fighting Championship
2018	Daniel Bryan	WWE
2019	Chris Jericho	All Elite Wrestling; New Japan Pro-Wrestling
2020	Eddie Kingston	All Elite Wrestling
2021	MJF	All Elite Wrestling
2022	MJF	All Elite Wrestling
2023	Eddie Kingston	All Elite Wrestling
2024	Drew McIntyre	WWE
2025	"Hangman" Adam Page	All Elite Wrestling

==== Promotion of the Year ====
Year	Promotion
1983	Jim Crockett Promotions
1984	New Japan Pro-Wrestling
1985	All Japan Pro Wrestling
1986	Mid-South Wrestling/Universal Wrestling Federation
1987	New Japan Pro-Wrestling
1988	New Japan Pro-Wrestling
1989	Universal Wrestling Federation
1990	All Japan Pro Wrestling
1991	All Japan Pro Wrestling
1992	New Japan Pro-Wrestling
1993	All Japan Pro Wrestling
1994	Asistencia Asesoría y Administración
1995	New Japan Pro-Wrestling
1996	New Japan Pro-Wrestling
1997	New Japan Pro-Wrestling
1998	New Japan Pro-Wrestling
1999	World Wrestling Federation
2000	World Wrestling Federation
2001	Pride Fighting Championships
2002	Pride Fighting Championships
2003	Pride Fighting Championships
2004	Pro Wrestling Noah
2005	Pro Wrestling Noah
2006	Ultimate Fighting Championship
2007	Ultimate Fighting Championship
2008	Ultimate Fighting Championship
2009	Ultimate Fighting Championship
2010	Ultimate Fighting Championship
2011	Ultimate Fighting Championship
2012	New Japan Pro-Wrestling
2013	New Japan Pro-Wrestling
2014	New Japan Pro-Wrestling
2015	New Japan Pro-Wrestling
2016	New Japan Pro-Wrestling
2017	New Japan Pro-Wrestling
2018	New Japan Pro-Wrestling
2019	New Japan Pro-Wrestling
2020	All Elite Wrestling
2021	All Elite Wrestling
2022	All Elite Wrestling
2023	WWE
2024	WWE
2025	Consejo Mundial de Lucha Libre

==== Best Weekly TV Show ====
The Ultimate Fighter is the only non-wrestling TV show to win the category.

Year	Program	Promotion
1983	World Pro-Wrestling	New Japan Pro-Wrestling
1984	World Pro-Wrestling	New Japan Pro-Wrestling
1985	Mid-South Wrestling	Mid-South Wrestling
1986	Universal Wrestling Federation	Universal Wrestling Federation
1987	90 Minute Memphis Live Wrestling	Continental Wrestling Association
1988	World Pro-Wrestling	New Japan Pro-Wrestling
1989	All Japan Pro Wrestling	All Japan Pro Wrestling
1990	All Japan Pro Wrestling	All Japan Pro Wrestling
1991	All Japan Pro Wrestling	All Japan Pro Wrestling
1992	All Japan Pro Wrestling	All Japan Pro Wrestling
1993	All Japan Pro Wrestling	All Japan Pro Wrestling
1994	Hardcore TV	Extreme Championship Wrestling
1995	Hardcore TV	Extreme Championship Wrestling
1996	Hardcore TV	Extreme Championship Wrestling
1997	World Pro-Wrestling	New Japan Pro-Wrestling
1998	Raw is War	World Wrestling Federation
1999	Raw is War	World Wrestling Federation
2000	Raw is War	World Wrestling Federation
2001	World Pro-Wrestling	New Japan Pro-Wrestling
2002	SmackDown!	World Wrestling Entertainment
2003	Power Hours	Pro Wrestling Noah
2004	Monday Night Raw	World Wrestling Entertainment
2005	The Ultimate Fighter	Ultimate Fighting Championship
2006	The Ultimate Fighter	Ultimate Fighting Championship
2007	The Ultimate Fighter	Ultimate Fighting Championship
2008	The Ultimate Fighter	Ultimate Fighting Championship
2009	Friday Night SmackDown	World Wrestling Entertainment
2010	Ring of Honor Wrestling	Ring of Honor
2011	Friday Night SmackDown	WWE
2012	Impact Wrestling	Total Nonstop Action Wrestling
2013	NXT	WWE
2014	NXT	WWE
2015	NXT	WWE
2016	New Japan Pro-Wrestling on AXS	New Japan Pro-Wrestling
2017	New Japan Pro-Wrestling on AXS	New Japan Pro-Wrestling
2018	NXT	WWE
2019	Dynamite	All Elite Wrestling
2020	Dynamite	All Elite Wrestling
2021	Dynamite	All Elite Wrestling
2022	Dynamite	All Elite Wrestling
2023	Dynamite	All Elite Wrestling
2024	Dynamite	All Elite Wrestling
2025	Dynamite	All Elite Wrestling

==== Pro Wrestling Match of the Year ====
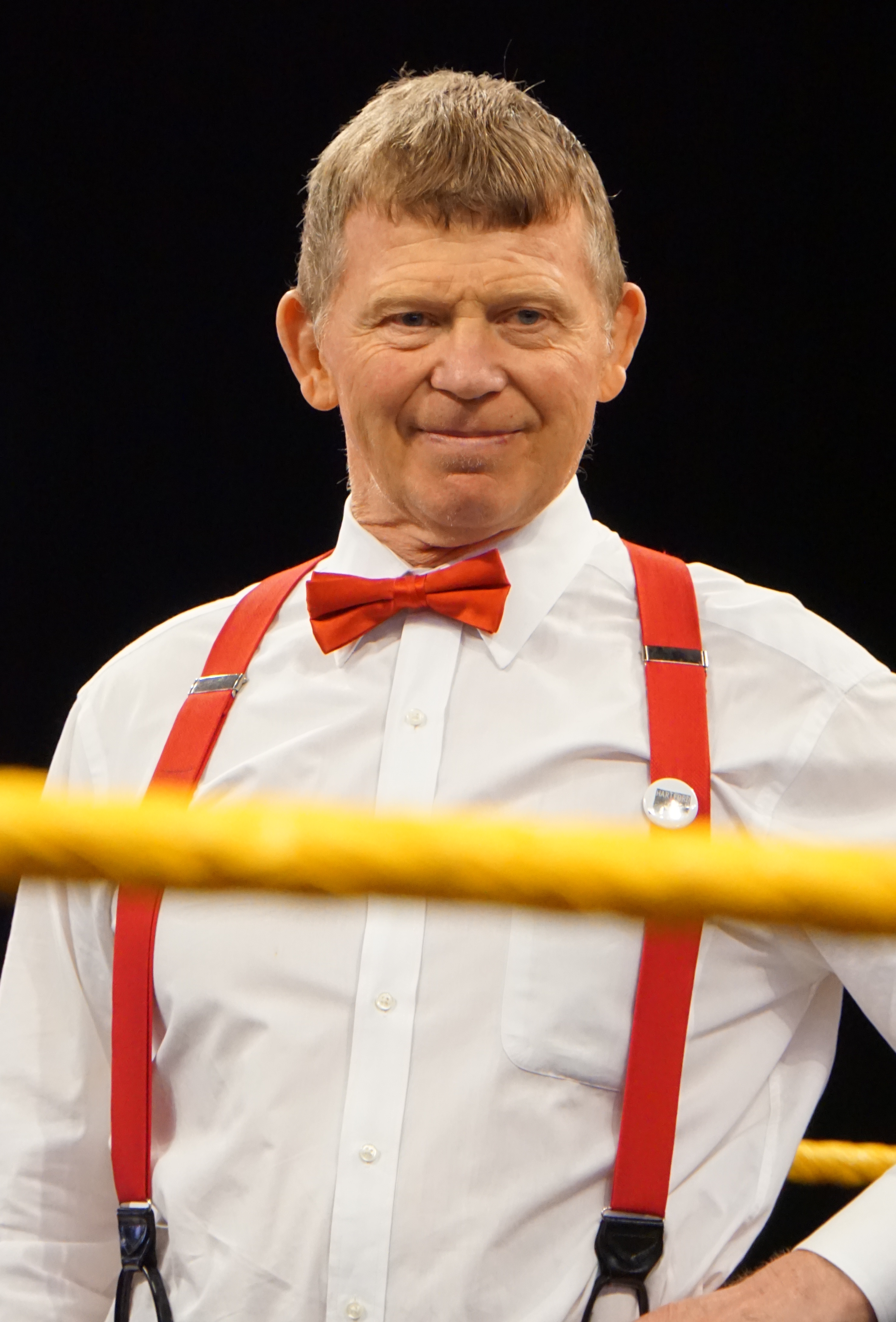
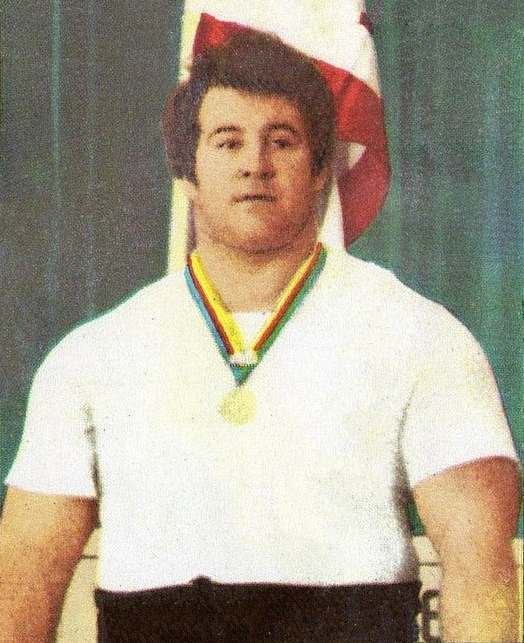
Bob Backlund and Ken Patera were the inaugural winners of the category, for their 1980 Texas Death Match in WWF.

Year	Match	Promotion	Show and venue
1980	Bob Backlund vs. Ken Patera; Texas Death Match	World Wrestling Federation	WWF on MSG Network; New York, New York; May 19
1981	Pat Patterson vs. Sgt. Slaughter; Alley Fight	World Wrestling Federation	WWF on MSG Network; New York, New York; May 4
1982	Tiger Mask vs. Dynamite Kid	New Japan Pro-Wrestling	Summer Fight Series II Night 19; Tokyo, Japan; August 5
1983	Ricky Steamboat and Jay Youngblood vs. Sgt. Slaughter and Don Kernodle; Steel Cage match	Jim Crockett Promotions	The Final Conflict; Greensboro, North Carolina; March 12
1984	The Freebirds vs. The Von Erichs; Anything Goes match	World Class Championship Wrestling	Independence Day Star Wars; Fort Worth, Texas; July 4
1985	Tiger Mask II vs. Kuniaki Kobayashi	All Japan Pro Wrestling	AJPW Special Wars in Budokan; Tokyo, Japan; June 21
1986	Ric Flair vs. Barry Windham	Championship Wrestling from Florida	Battle of the Belts II; Orlando, Florida; February 14
1987	Ricky "The Dragon" Steamboat vs. Randy "Macho Man" Savage	World Wrestling Federation	WrestleMania III; Pontiac, Michigan; March 29
1988	Sting vs. Ric Flair	Jim Crockett Promotions	Clash of the Champions I Greensboro, North Carolina; March 27
1989	Ricky Steamboat vs. Ric Flair; Two out of three falls match	World Championship Wrestling	Clash of the Champions VI; New Orleans, Louisiana; April 2
1990	Jushin Thunder Liger vs. Naoki Sano	New Japan Pro-Wrestling	New Spring Gold Series; Osaka, Japan; January 31
1991	Hiroshi Hase and Kensuke Sasaki vs. Steiner Brothers	New Japan Pro-Wrestling World Championship Wrestling	Starrcade in Tokyo Dome; Tokyo, Japan; March 21
1992	Kenta Kobashi and Tsuyoshi Kikuchi vs. Doug Furnas and Dan Kroffat	All Japan Pro Wrestling	Super Power Series Night 8 Sendai, Japan; May 25
1993	Manami Toyota and Toshiyo Yamada vs. Dynamite Kansai and Mayumi Ozaki	All Japan Women's Pro-Wrestling	Dream Slam II; Osaka, Japan; April 11
1994	Razor Ramon vs. Shawn Michaels; Ladder match	World Wrestling Federation	WrestleMania X New York, New York; March 20
1995	Manami Toyota vs. Kyoko Inoue	All Japan Women's Pro-Wrestling	G*Top 2nd Tokyo, Japan; May 7
1996	Mitsuharu Misawa and Jun Akiyama vs. Steve Williams and Johnny Ace	All Japan Pro Wrestling	Super Power Series Night 15; Tokyo, Japan; June 7
1997	Bret Hart vs. Stone Cold Steve Austin; Submission match	World Wrestling Federation	WrestleMania 13; Rosemont, Illinois; March 23
1998	Kenta Kobashi vs. Mitsuharu Misawa	All Japan Pro Wrestling	October Giant Series Night 18; Tokyo, Japan; October 31
1999	Kenta Kobashi vs. Mitsuharu Misawa	All Japan Pro Wrestling	Super Power Series Night 14; Tokyo, Japan; June 11
2000	Atlantis vs. Villano III	Consejo Mundial de Lucha Libre	Juicio Final; Mexico City, Mexico; March 17
2001	Keiji Muto vs. Genichiro Tenryu	All Japan Pro Wrestling	Super Power in Budokan; Tokyo, Japan; June 8
2002	Kurt Angle and Chris Benoit vs. Edge and Rey Mysterio	World Wrestling Entertainment	No Mercy; North Little Rock, Arkansas; October 20
2003	Kenta Kobashi vs. Mitsuharu Misawa	Pro Wrestling Noah	Navigate for Evolution Night 9 Tokyo, Japan; March 1
2004	Kenta Kobashi vs. Jun Akiyama	Pro Wrestling Noah	Departure; Tokyo, Japan; July 10
2005	Kenta Kobashi vs. Samoa Joe	Ring of Honor	Joe vs. Kobashi; Manhattan, New York; October 1
2006	Dragon Kid, Ryo Saito and Genki Horiguchi vs. Cima, Masato Yoshino and Naruki Doi	Ring of Honor	Supercard of Honor; Chicago Ridge, Illinois; March 31
2007	Takeshi Morishima vs. Bryan Danielson	Ring of Honor	Manhattan Mayhem II; Manhattan, New York; August 25
2008	Chris Jericho vs. Shawn Michaels; Ladder match	World Wrestling Entertainment/WWE	No Mercy; Portland, Oregon; October 5
2009	The Undertaker vs. Shawn Michaels	World Wrestling Entertainment/WWE	WrestleMania XXV; Houston, Texas; April 5
2010	The Undertaker vs. Shawn Michaels	World Wrestling Entertainment/WWE	WrestleMania XXVI; Glendale, Arizona; March 28
2011	CM Punk vs. John Cena	World Wrestling Entertainment/WWE	Money in the Bank; Rosemont, Illinois; July 17
2012	Hiroshi Tanahashi vs. Minoru Suzuki	New Japan Pro-Wrestling	King of Pro-Wrestling; Tokyo, Japan; October 8
2013	Hiroshi Tanahashi vs. Kazuchika Okada	New Japan Pro-Wrestling	Invasion Attack; Tokyo, Japan; April 7
2014	AJ Styles vs. Minoru Suzuki	New Japan Pro-Wrestling	G1 Climax 24 Night 7 Tokyo, Japan; August 1
2015	Shinsuke Nakamura vs. Kota Ibushi	New Japan Pro-Wrestling	Wrestle Kingdom 9 Tokyo, Japan; January 4
2016	Kazuchika Okada vs. Hiroshi Tanahashi	New Japan Pro-Wrestling	Wrestle Kingdom 10; Tokyo, Japan; January 4
2017	Kazuchika Okada vs. Kenny Omega	New Japan Pro-Wrestling	Wrestle Kingdom 11; Tokyo, Japan; January 4
2018	Kenny Omega vs. Kazuchika Okada; Two out of three falls match	New Japan Pro-Wrestling	Dominion 6.9 in Osaka-jo Hall; Osaka, Japan; June 9
2019	Will Ospreay vs. Shingo Takagi	New Japan Pro-Wrestling	Best of the Super Juniors 26 Final; Tokyo, Japan; June 5
2020	Kenny Omega and "Hangman" Adam Page vs. The Young Bucks	All Elite Wrestling	Revolution; Chicago, Illinois; February 29
2021	The Young Bucks vs. The Lucha Brothers; Steel Cage match	All Elite Wrestling	All Out; Chicago, Illinois; September 5
2022	Kazuchika Okada vs. Will Ospreay	New Japan Pro-Wrestling	G1 Climax 32 Final; Tokyo, Japan; August 18
2023	Kenny Omega vs. Will Ospreay	New Japan Pro-Wrestling	Wrestle Kingdom 17; Tokyo, Japan; January 4
2024	Bryan Danielson vs. Will Ospreay	All Elite Wrestling	Dynasty; St. Louis, Missouri; April 21
2025	Kenny Omega vs. Gabe Kidd	All Elite Wrestling; Consejo Mundial de Lucha Libre; New Japan Pro-Wrestling; Ring of Honor; World Wonder Ring Stardom	Wrestle Dynasty; Tokyo, Japan; January 5

==== MMA Match of the Year ====
Note: Was previously known as the "Shoot Match of the Year" and is sometimes referred to as "Fight of the Year".

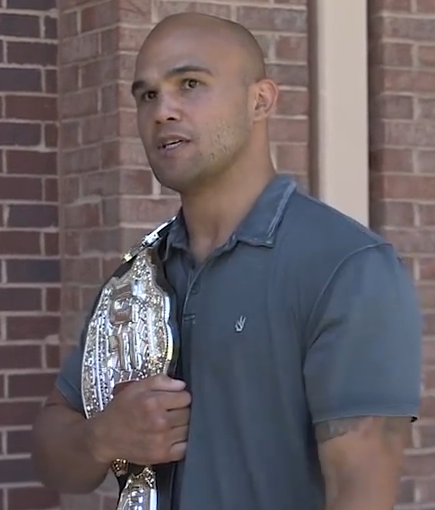
Robbie Lawler is a three-time winner of the category.

Year	Fight	Promotion	Show and venue
1997	Maurice Smith vs. Mark Coleman	Ultimate Fighting Championship	UFC 14; Birmingham, Alabama; July 27
1998	Jerry Bohlander vs. Kevin Jackson	Ultimate Fighting Championship	UFC 16; New Orleans, Louisiana; March 13
1999	Frank Shamrock vs. Tito Ortiz	Ultimate Fighting Championship	UFC 22; Lake Charles, Louisiana; September 24
2000	Kazushi Sakuraba vs. Royce Gracie	Pride Fighting Championships	Grand Prix 2000 Finals; Tokyo Dome; May 1
2001	Randy Couture vs. Pedro Rizzo	Ultimate Fighting Championship	UFC 31; Atlantic City, New Jersey; May 4
2002	Don Frye vs. Yoshihiro Takayama	Pride Fighting Championships	Pride 21; Saitama, Japan; June 23
2003	Wanderlei Silva vs. Hidehiko Yoshida	Pride Fighting Championships	Final Conflict; Tokyo, Japan; November 9
2004	Wanderlei Silva vs. Quinton Jackson	Pride Fighting Championships	Pride 28; Saitama, Japan; October 31
2005	Forrest Griffin vs. Stephan Bonnar	Ultimate Fighting Championship	The Ultimate Fighter 1 Finale; Las Vegas, Nevada; April 9
2006	Diego Sanchez vs. Karo Parisyan	Ultimate Fighting Championship	Fight Night: Sanchez vs. Parisyan; Las Vegas, Nevada; August 17
2007	Randy Couture vs. Tim Sylvia	Ultimate Fighting Championship	UFC 68; Columbus, Ohio; March 3
2008	Forrest Griffin vs. Quinton Jackson	Ultimate Fighting Championship	UFC 86; Las Vegas, Nevada; July 5
2009	Diego Sanchez vs. Clay Guida	Ultimate Fighting Championship	The Ultimate Fighter: United States vs. United Kingdom Finale; Las Vegas, Nevada; June 20
2010	Leonard Garcia vs. Chan Sung Jung	World Extreme Cagefighting	WEC 48; Sacramento, California; April 24
2011	Dan Henderson vs. Shogun Rua	Ultimate Fighting Championship	UFC 139; San Jose, California; November 19
2012	Chan Sung Jung vs. Dustin Poirier	Ultimate Fighting Championship	UFC on Fuel TV: Korean Zombie vs. Poirier; Fairfax, Virginia; May 15
2013	Gilbert Melendez vs. Diego Sanchez	Ultimate Fighting Championship	UFC 166; Houston, Texas; October 19
2014	Johny Hendricks vs. Robbie Lawler	Ultimate Fighting Championship	UFC 171; Dallas, Texas; March 15
2015	Robbie Lawler vs. Rory MacDonald	Ultimate Fighting Championship	UFC 189; Las Vegas, Nevada; July 11
2016	Robbie Lawler vs. Carlos Condit	Ultimate Fighting Championship	UFC 195; Las Vegas, Nevada; January 2
2017	Cub Swanson vs. Doo Ho Choi	Ultimate Fighting Championship	UFC 206; Toronto, Ontario; December 10, 2016
2018	Dustin Poirier vs. Justin Gaethje	Ultimate Fighting Championship	UFC on Fox: Poirier vs. Gaethje; Glendale, Arizona; April 14
2019	Israel Adesanya vs. Kelvin Gastelum	Ultimate Fighting Championship	UFC 236; Atlanta, Georgia; April 13
2020	Zhang Weili vs. Joanna Jędrzejczyk	Ultimate Fighting Championship	UFC 248; Las Vegas, Nevada; March 7
2021	Justin Gaethje vs. Michael Chandler	Ultimate Fighting Championship	UFC 268; New York City, New York; November 6
2022	Jiří Procházka vs. Glover Teixeira	Ultimate Fighting Championship	UFC 275; Kallang, Singapore; June 11
2023	Alexander Volkanovski vs. Islam Makhachev	Ultimate Fighting Championship	UFC 284; Perth, Australia; February 12
2024	Max Holloway vs. Justin Gaethje	Ultimate Fighting Championship	UFC 300; Las Vegas, Nevada; April 13
2025	Brandon Royval vs. Joshua Van	Ultimate Fighting Championship	UFC 317; Las Vegas, Nevada; June 28

=== "Category B" awards ===
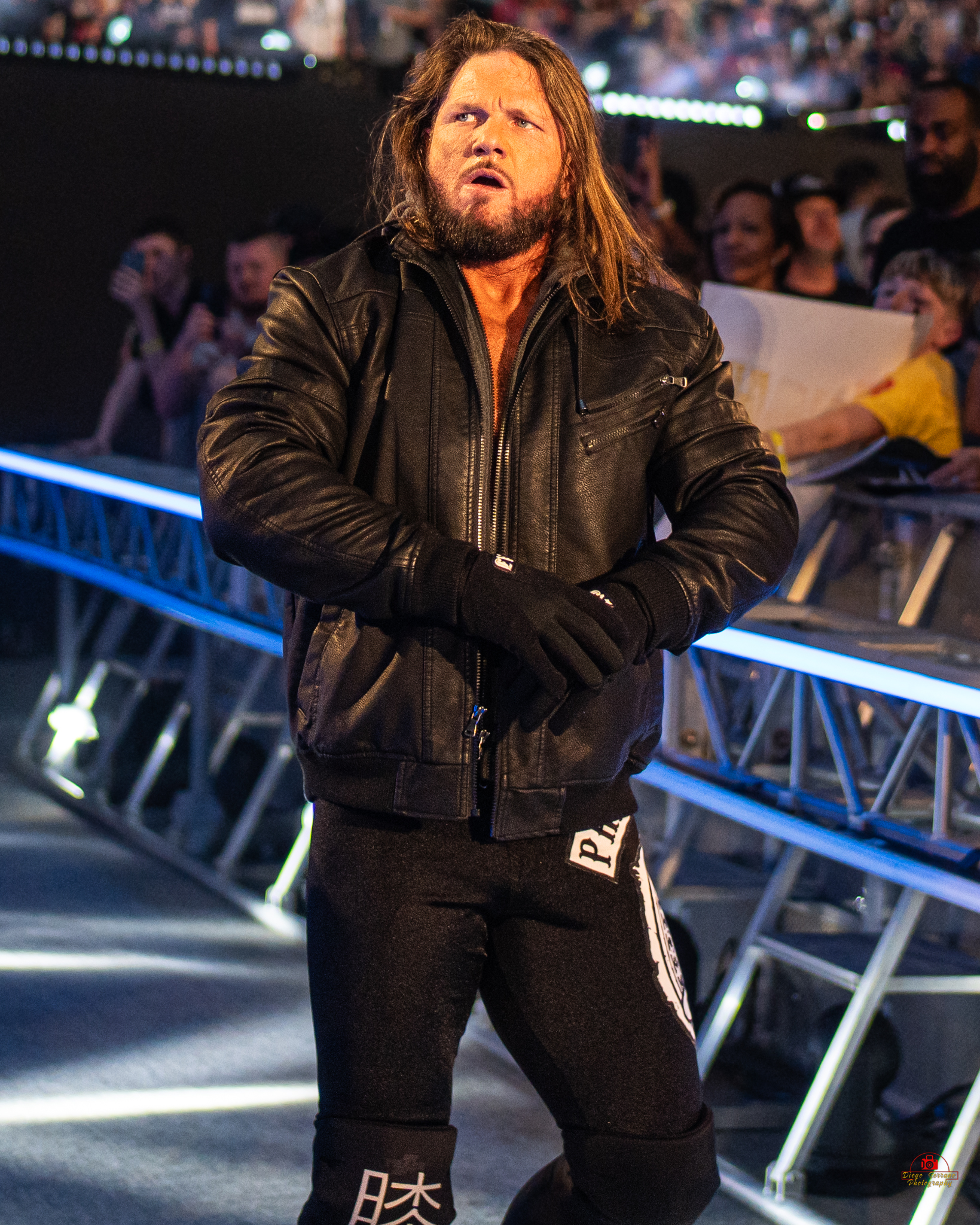
AJ Styles was the inaugural United States/Canada MVP.

==== United States/Canada MVP ====
Year	Wrestler	Promotion(s)
2018	AJ Styles	WWE
2019	Chris Jericho	All Elite Wrestling; New Japan Pro-Wrestling
2020	Jon Moxley	All Elite Wrestling; New Japan Pro-Wrestling
2021	Kenny Omega	All Elite Wrestling
2022	Jon Moxley	All Elite Wrestling; New Japan Pro-Wrestling
2023	Cody Rhodes	WWE
2024	Cody Rhodes	WWE
2025	Jon Moxley	All Elite Wrestling

==== Koichi Yoshizawa Award (Japan MVP) ====
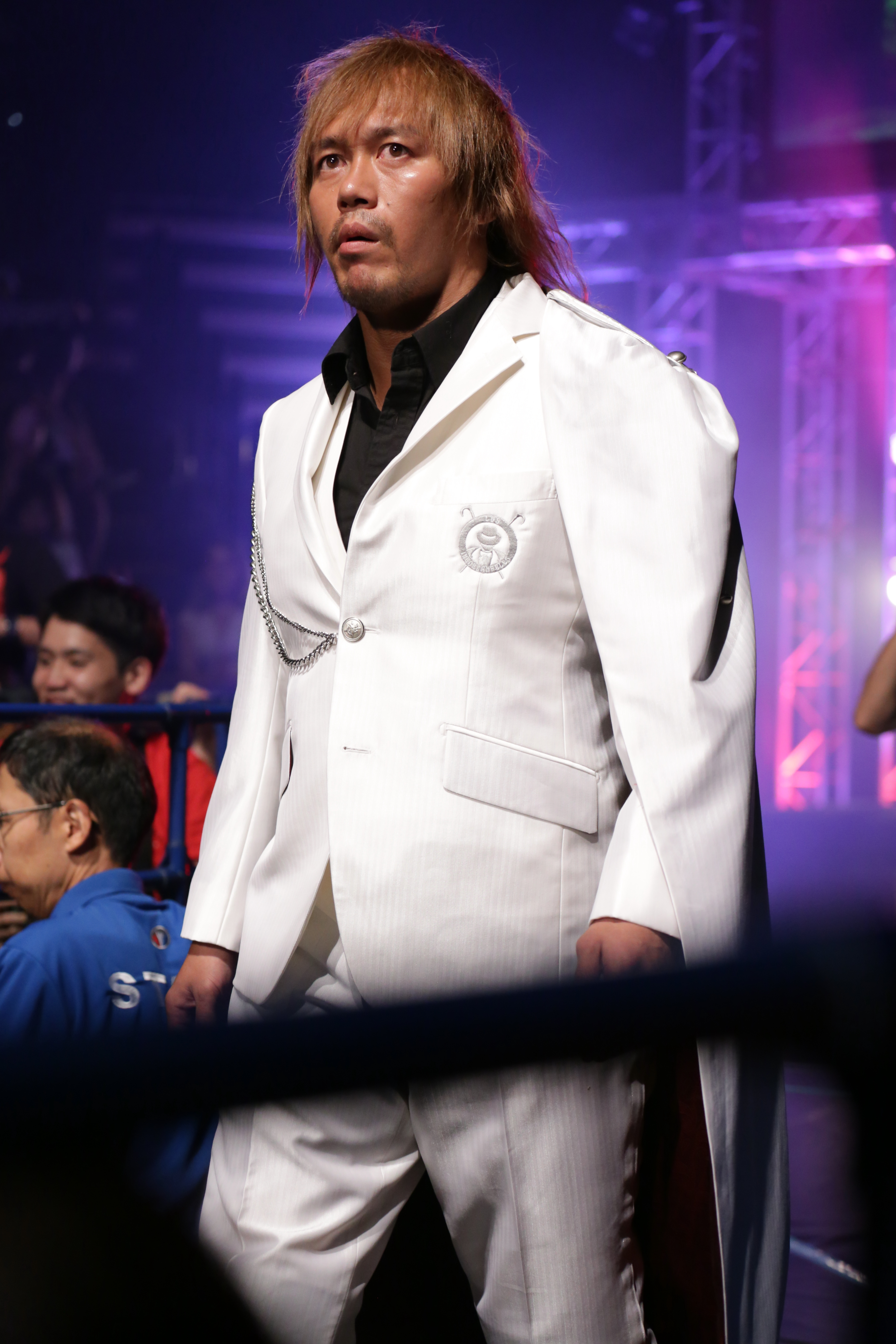
Tetsuya Naito is one of seven New Japan Pro-Wrestling wrestlers to be named Japan MVP.

Year	Wrestler	Promotion(s)
2018	Kenny Omega	New Japan Pro-Wrestling
2019	Kazuchika Okada	New Japan Pro-Wrestling
2020	Tetsuya Naito	New Japan Pro-Wrestling
2021	Shingo Takagi	New Japan Pro-Wrestling
2022	Kazuchika Okada	New Japan Pro-Wrestling
2023	Will Ospreay	New Japan Pro-Wrestling
2024	Zack Sabre Jr.	New Japan Pro-Wrestling
2025	Saya Kamitani	World Wonder Ring Stardom

==== Mexico MVP ====
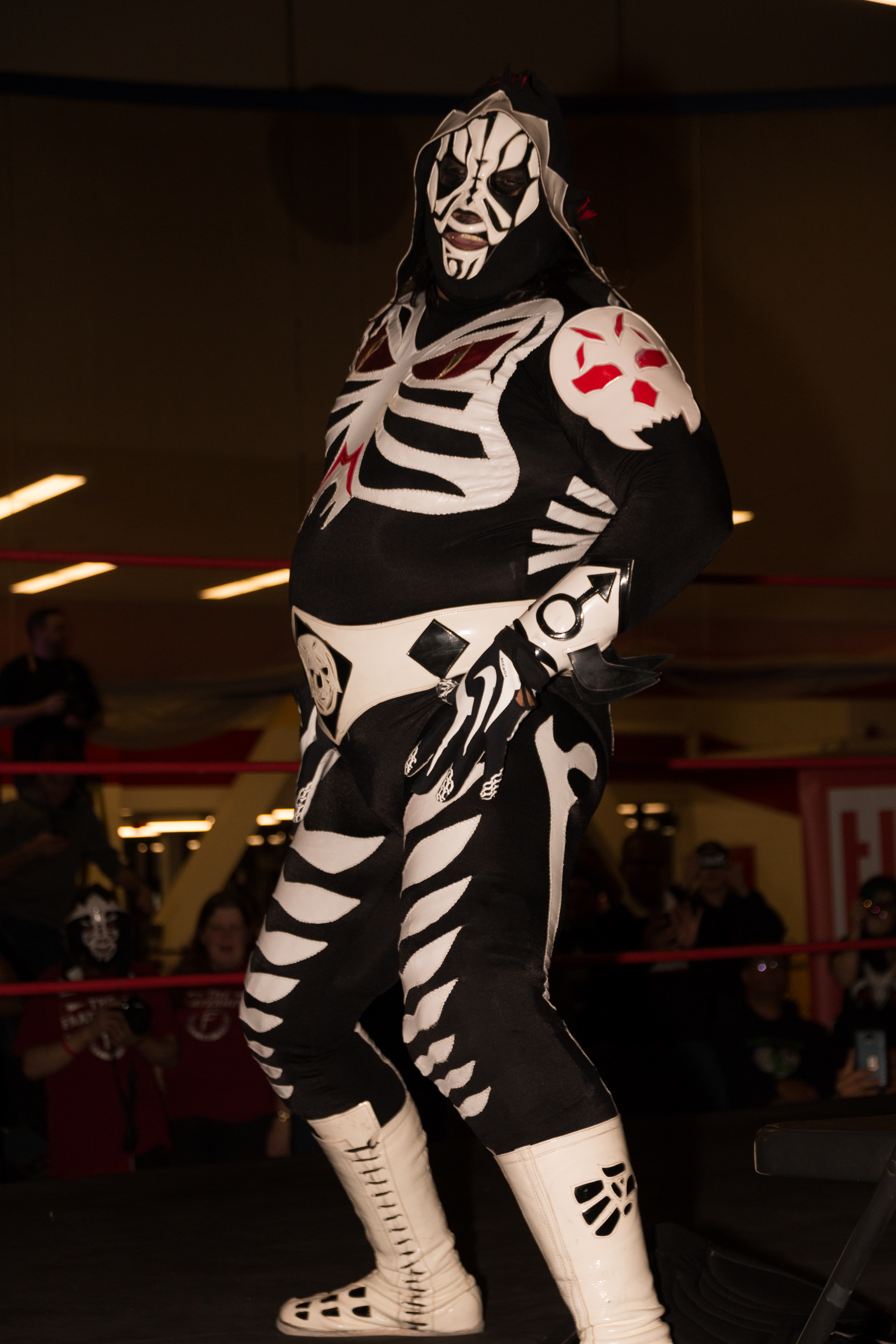
L. A. Park was the inaugural Mexico MVP.

Year	Wrestler	Promotion(s)
2018	L.A. Park	Consejo Mundial de Lucha Libre; Lucha Libre AAA Worldwide
2019	Rey Fénix	All Elite Wrestling; Impact Wrestling; Lucha Libre AAA Worldwide
2020	Rey Fénix	All Elite Wrestling; Lucha Libre AAA Worldwide
2021	El Hijo del Vikingo	Lucha Libre AAA Worldwide
2022	El Hijo del Vikingo	Lucha Libre AAA Worldwide
2023	Místico	Consejo Mundial de Lucha Libre
2024	Místico	Consejo Mundial de Lucha Libre
2025	Místico	Consejo Mundial de Lucha Libre

==== Europe MVP ====
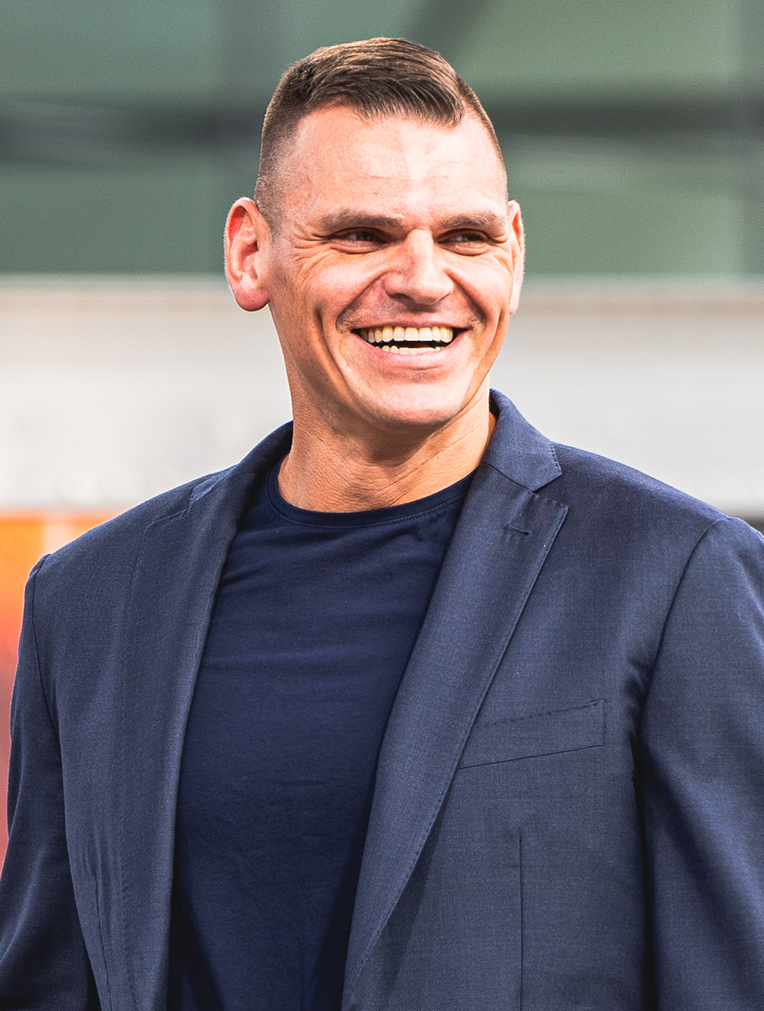
Walter, better known as Gunther, was the inaugural Europe MVP, and overall is a record three-time winner.

Year	Wrestler	Promotion(s)
2018	Walter	Over the Top Wrestling; Progress Wrestling; Westside Xtreme Wrestling
2019	Walter	WWE
2020	Walter	WWE
2021	Will Ospreay	Revolution Pro Wrestling; New Japan Pro-Wrestling
2022	Will Ospreay	Revolution Pro Wrestling; New Japan Pro-Wrestling
2023	Will Ospreay	Revolution Pro Wrestling; New Japan Pro-Wrestling
2024	Michael Oku	Revolution Pro Wrestling
2025	Michael Oku	Revolution Pro Wrestling

==== Danny Hodge Memorial Award (Non-Heavyweight MVP) ====
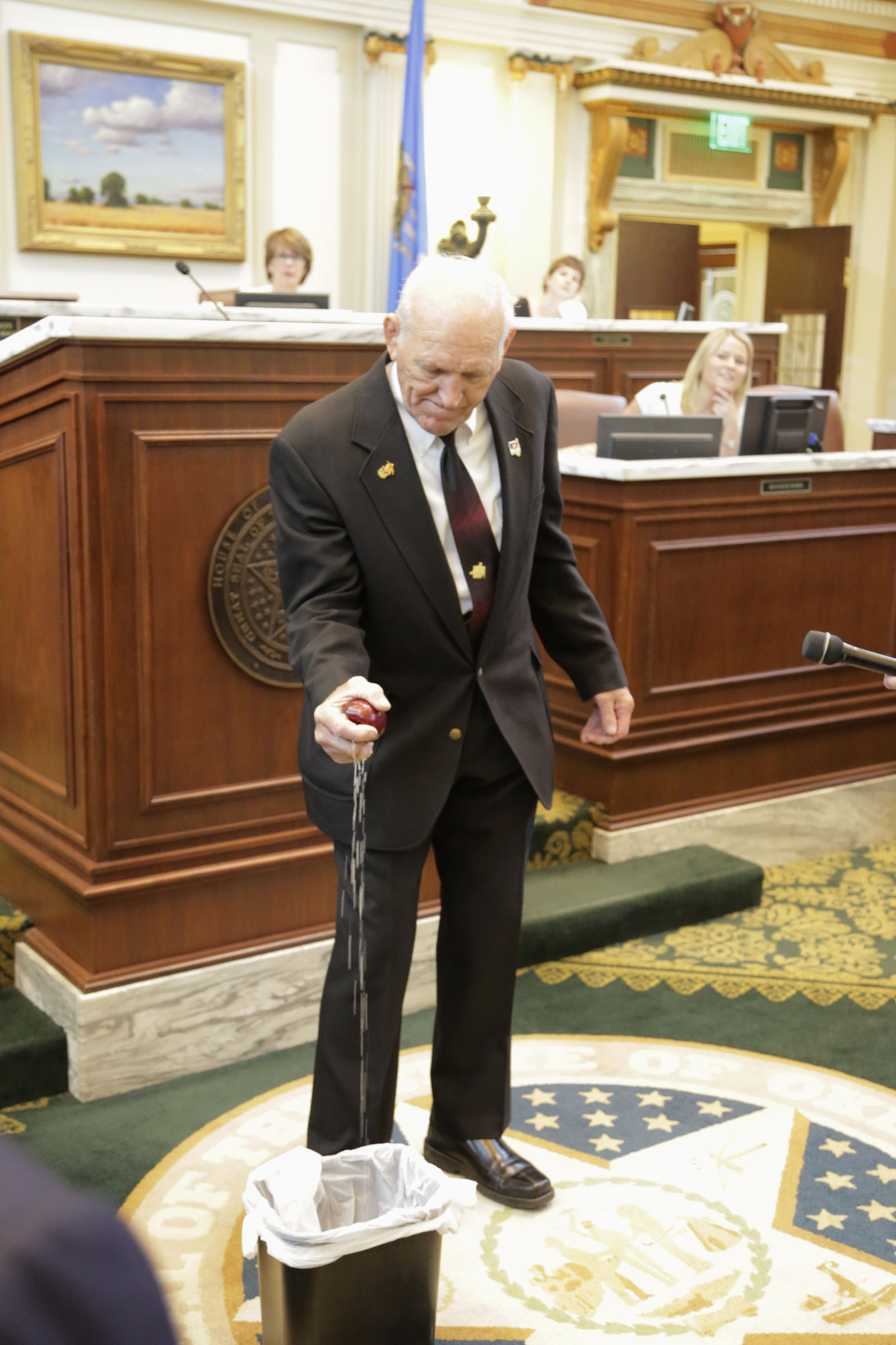
Danny Hodge was the namesake for the award, a multi-time amateur and professional champion.

Year	Wrestler	Promotion(s)
2018	Will Ospreay	New Japan Pro-Wrestling; Progress Wrestling; Revolution Pro Wrestling; Ring of Honor
2019	Will Ospreay	New Japan Pro-Wrestling; Progress Wrestling; Revolution Pro Wrestling; Ring of Honor
2020	Hiromu Takahashi	New Japan Pro-Wrestling
2021	Darby Allin	All Elite Wrestling
2022	El Hijo del Vikingo	Lucha Libre AAA Worldwide
2023	El Hijo del Vikingo	Lucha Libre AAA Worldwide
2024	Darby Allin	All Elite Wrestling
2025	Místico	Consejo Mundial de Lucha Libre

==== Women's Wrestling MVP ====
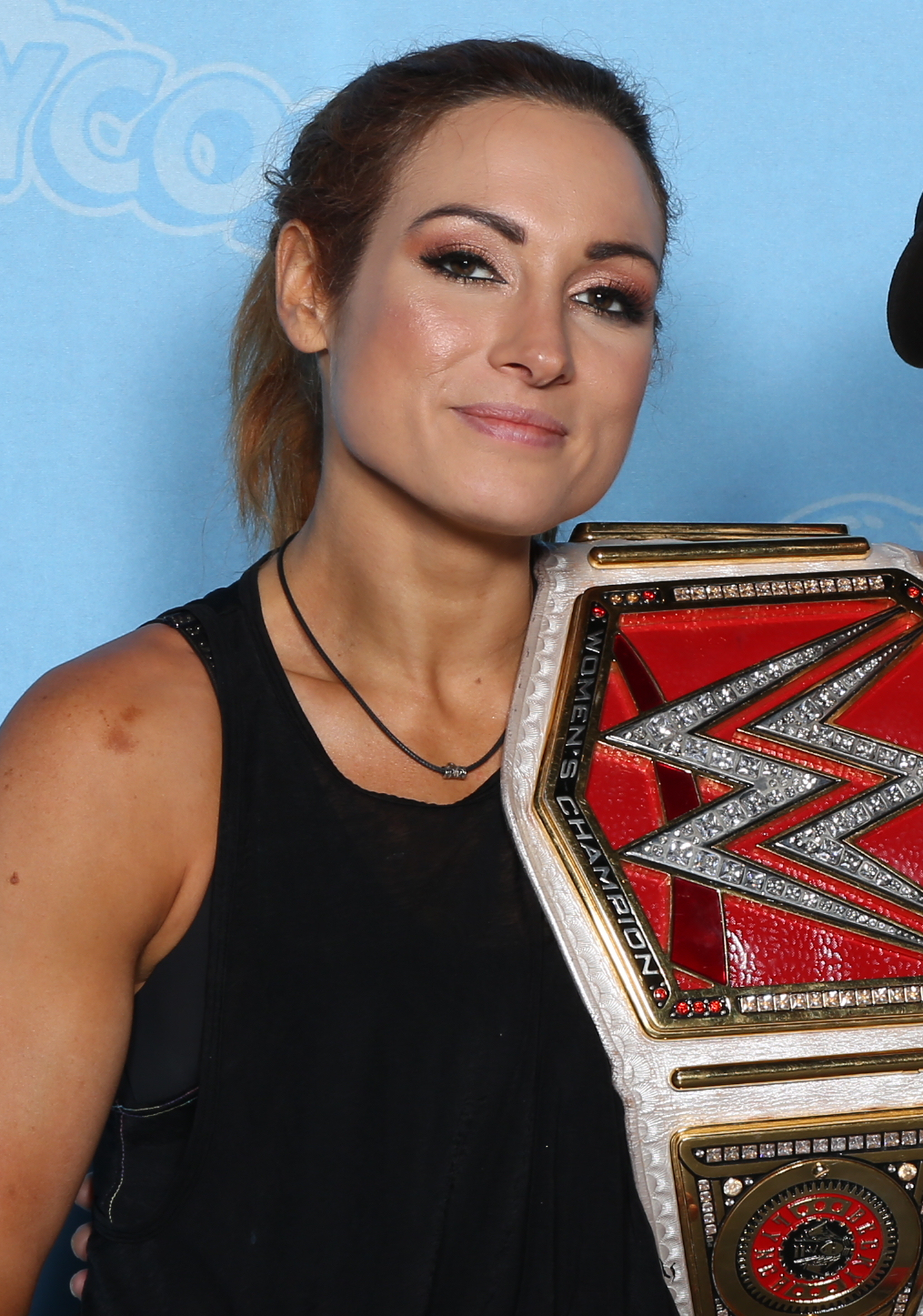
Becky Lynch was the inaugural winner of the award, and is a record two-time winner.

Year	Wrestler	Promotion(s)
2018	Becky Lynch	WWE
2019	Becky Lynch	WWE
2020	Bayley	WWE
2021	Utami Hayashishita	World Wonder Ring Stardom
2022	Syuri	World Wonder Ring Stardom
2023	Rhea Ripley	WWE
2024	Sareee	Sareee-ISM
2025	Saya Kamitani	World Wonder Ring Stardom

==== Women's MMA MVP ====
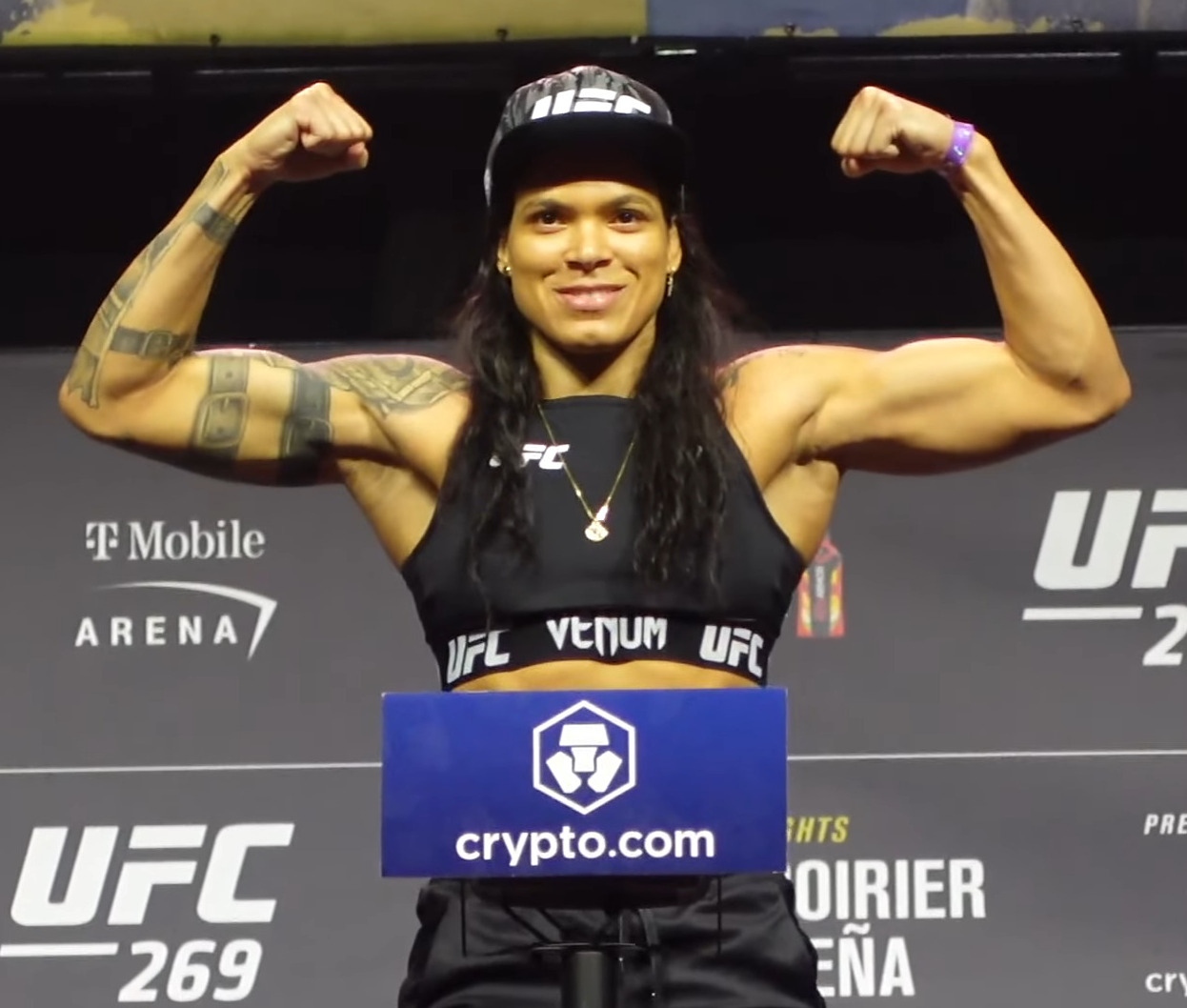
Amanda Nunes is a record three-time winner.

Year	Wrestler	Promotion(s)
2018	Amanda Nunes	Ultimate Fighting Championship
2019	Amanda Nunes	Ultimate Fighting Championship
2020	Amanda Nunes	Ultimate Fighting Championship
2021	Rose Namajunas	Ultimate Fighting Championship
2022	Zhang Weili	Ultimate Fighting Championship
2023	Alexa Grasso	Ultimate Fighting Championship
2024	Zhang Weili	Ultimate Fighting Championship
2025	Valentina Shevchenko	Ultimate Fighting Championship

==== Best Box Office Draw ====
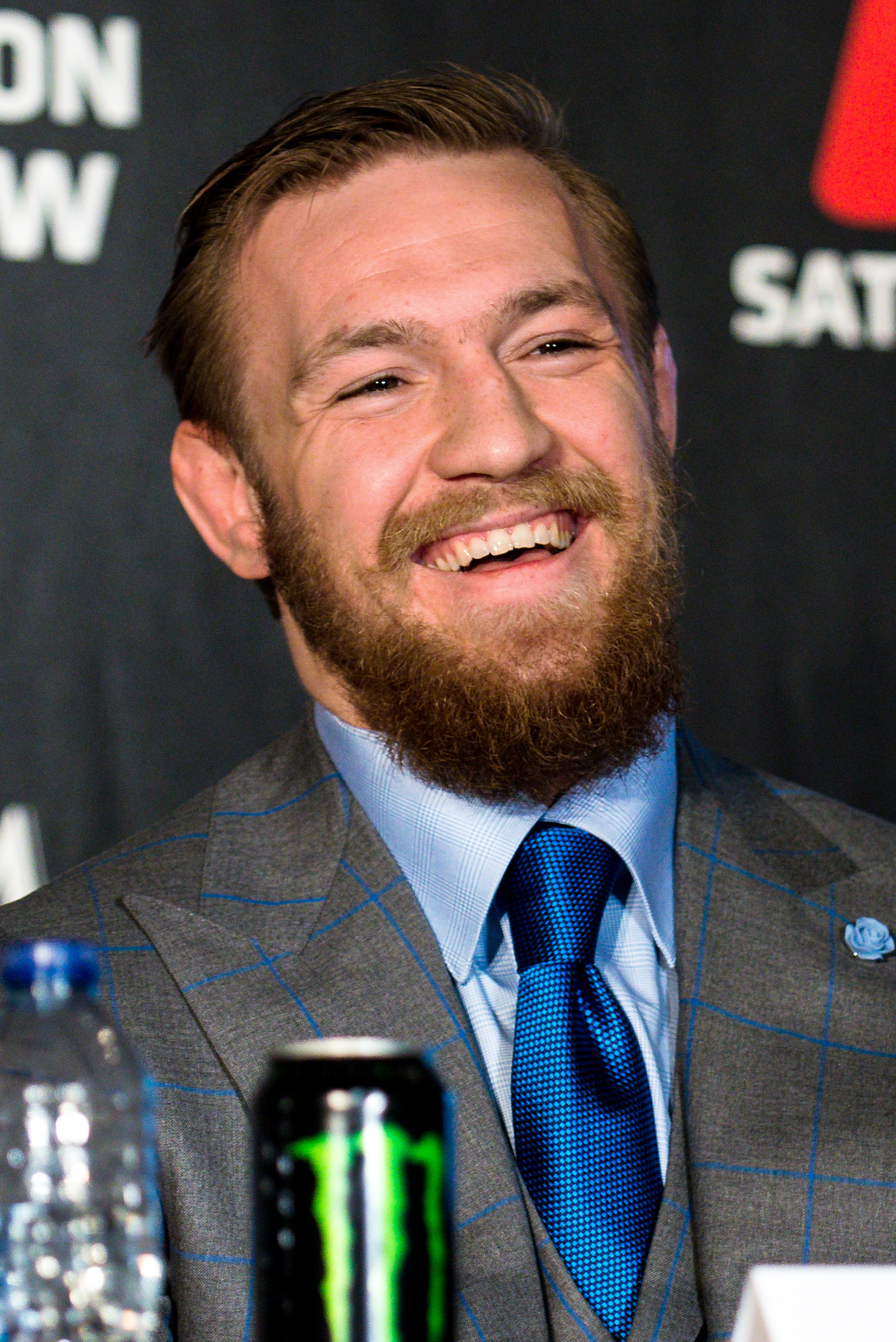
Conor McGregor is a record five-time winner as Best Box Office Draw, and is the only person to have won both before and after it was split into separate MMA and pro wrestling awards.

Year	Performer	Promotion(s)
1997	Hollywood Hogan	World Championship Wrestling
1998	Stone Cold Steve Austin	World Wrestling Federation
1999	Stone Cold Steve Austin	World Wrestling Federation
2000	The Rock	World Wrestling Federation
2001	Kazushi Sakuraba	Pride Fighting Championships
2002	Bob Sapp	K-1; Pride Fighting Championships; New Japan Pro-Wrestling
2003	Bob Sapp	K-1; Pride Fighting Championships; New Japan Pro-Wrestling
2004	Kenta Kobashi	Pro Wrestling Noah
2005	Kenta Kobashi	Pro Wrestling Noah
2006	Místico	Consejo Mundial de Lucha Libre
2007	John Cena	World Wrestling Entertainment
2008	Brock Lesnar	Ultimate Fighting Championship
2009	Brock Lesnar	Ultimate Fighting Championship
2010	Brock Lesnar	Ultimate Fighting Championship
2011	The Rock	WWE
2012	The Rock	WWE
2013	Georges St-Pierre	Ultimate Fighting Championship
2014	Ronda Rousey	Ultimate Fighting Championship
2015	Ronda Rousey	Ultimate Fighting Championship
2016	Conor McGregor	Ultimate Fighting Championship
2017	Conor McGregor	Ultimate Fighting Championship
2018	Conor McGregor	Ultimate Fighting Championship
2019	Chris Jericho	All Elite Wrestling; New Japan Pro-Wrestling
2020	Conor McGregor	Ultimate Fighting Championship
2021	MMA: Conor McGregor	Ultimate Fighting Championship
2021	Pro Wrestling: CM Punk	All Elite Wrestling
2022	MMA: Israel Adesanya	Ultimate Fighting Championship
2022	Pro Wrestling: Roman Reigns	WWE
2023	MMA: Jon Jones	Ultimate Fighting Championship
2023	Pro Wrestling: Roman Reigns	WWE
2024	MMA: Alex Pereira	Ultimate Fighting Championship
2024	Pro Wrestling: Cody Rhodes	WWE
2025	MMA: Merab Dvalishvili	Ultimate Fighting Championship
2025	Pro Wrestling: John Cena	WWE

==== Feud of the Year ====
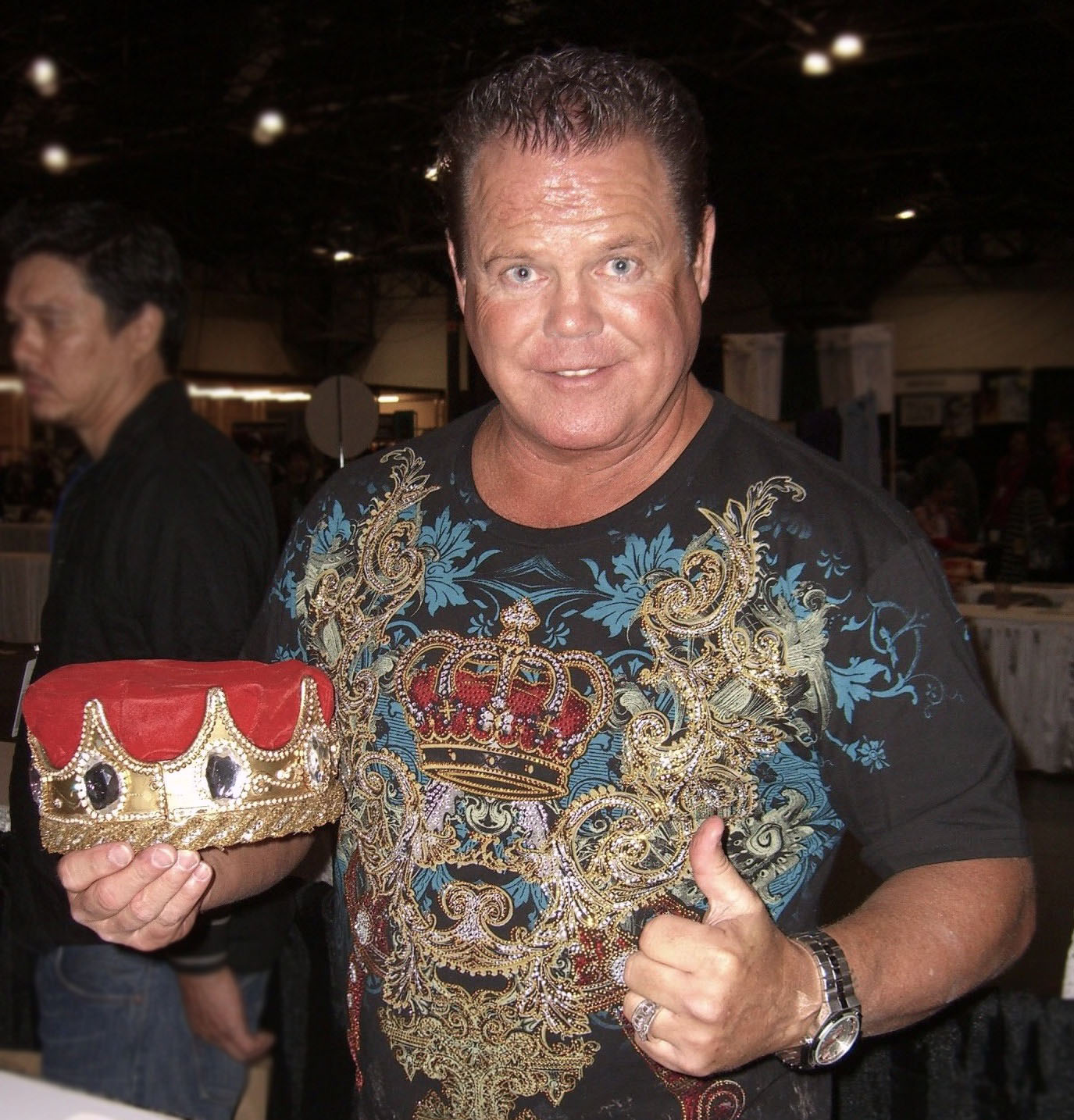
Jerry Lawler was the first wrestler to win the category three different times.
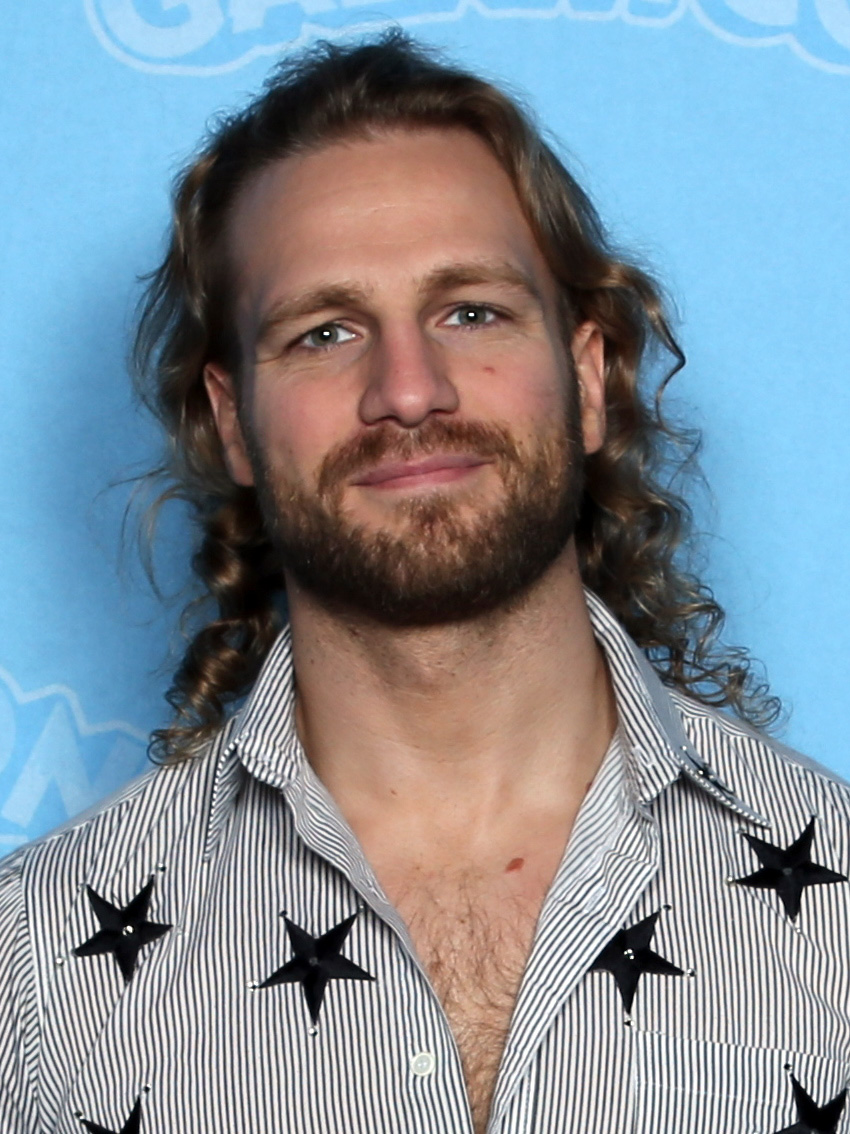
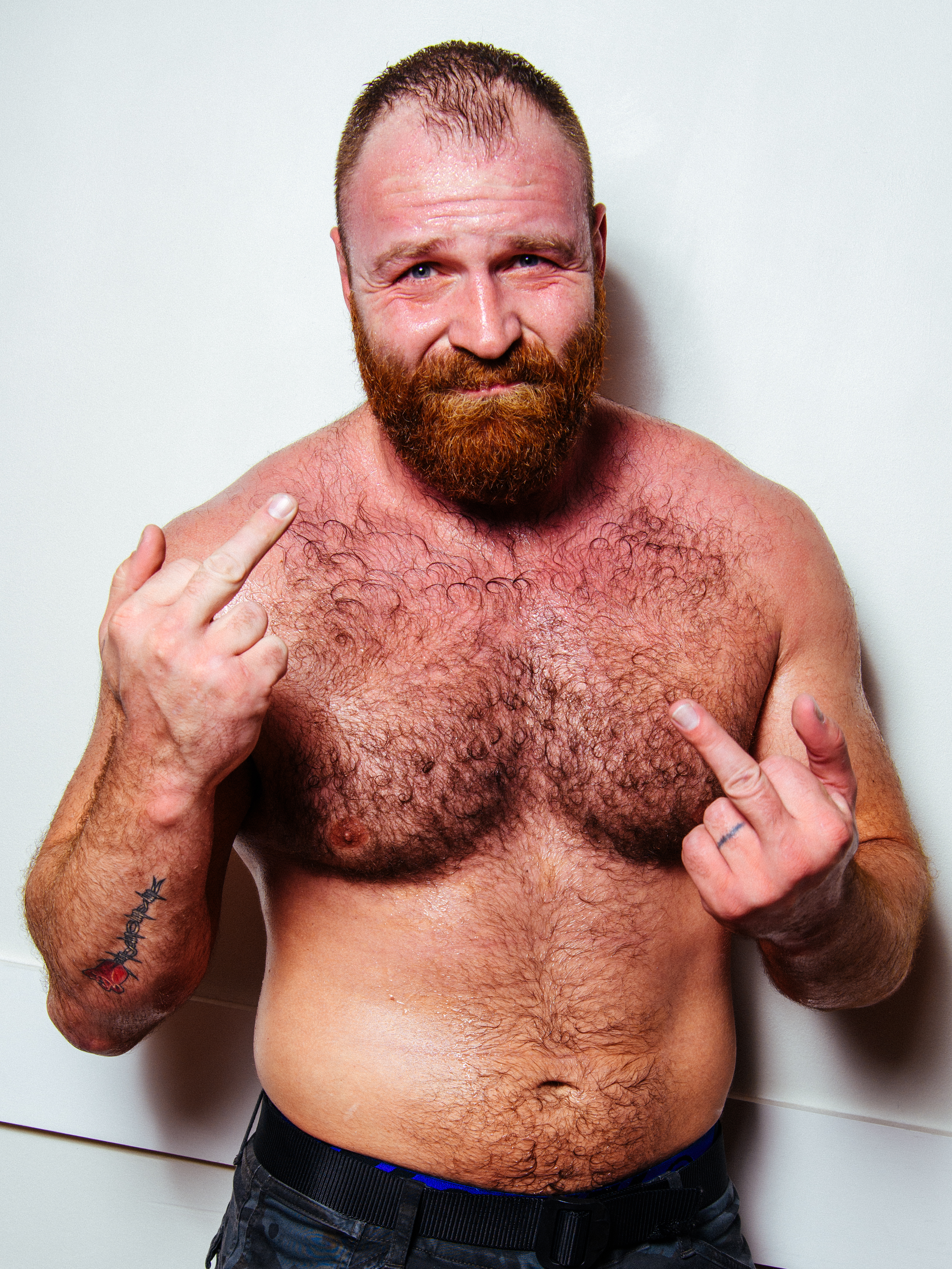
"Hangman" Adam Page & Jon Moxley are the most recent winners of the award.

Year	Feud	Promotion(s)
1980	Bruno Sammartino vs. Larry Zbyszko	World Wrestling Federation
1981	André the Giant vs. Killer Khan	World Wrestling Federation
1982	Ted DiBiase vs. Junkyard Dog	Mid-South Wrestling
1983	The Freebirds vs. The Von Erichs	World Class Championship Wrestling
1984	The Freebirds vs. The Von Erichs	World Class Championship Wrestling; National Wrestling Alliance
1985	Ted DiBiase vs. Jim Duggan	Mid-South Wrestling
1986	Hulk Hogan vs. Paul Orndorff	World Wrestling Federation
1987	Austin Idol & Tommy Rich vs. Jerry Lawler	Continental Wrestling Association
1988	The Fantastics vs. The Midnight Express	Jim Crockett Promotions
1989	Ric Flair vs. Terry Funk	World Championship Wrestling
1990	Mitsuharu Misawa vs. Jumbo Tsuruta	All Japan Pro Wrestling
1991	Mitsuharu Misawa and company vs. Jumbo Tsuruta and company	All Japan Pro Wrestling
1992	Jeff Jarrett & Jerry Lawler vs. The Moondogs	United States Wrestling Association
1993	Bret Hart vs. Jerry Lawler	World Wrestling Federation
1994	Los Gringos Locos vs. Asistencia Asesoría y Administración	Asistencia Asesoría y Administración
1995	Eddie Guerrero vs. Dean Malenko	Extreme Championship Wrestling
1996	New World Order vs. World Championship Wrestling	World Championship Wrestling
1997	Stone Cold Steve Austin vs. The Hart Foundation	World Wrestling Federation
1998	Stone Cold Steve Austin vs. Vince McMahon	World Wrestling Federation
1999	Stone Cold Steve Austin vs. Vince McMahon	World Wrestling Federation
2000	Mick Foley vs. Triple H	World Wrestling Federation
2001	Kazushi Sakuraba vs. Wanderlei Silva	Pride Fighting Championships
2002	Tito Ortiz vs. Ken Shamrock	Ultimate Fighting Championship
2003	Kurt Angle vs. Brock Lesnar	World Wrestling Entertainment
2004	Chris Benoit vs. Shawn Michaels vs. Triple H	World Wrestling Entertainment
2005	Batista vs. Triple H	World Wrestling Entertainment
2006	Tito Ortiz vs. Ken Shamrock	Ultimate Fighting Championship
2007	Batista vs. The Undertaker	World Wrestling Entertainment
2008	Chris Jericho vs. Shawn Michaels	World Wrestling Entertainment
2009	Jeff Hardy vs. CM Punk	World Wrestling Entertainment
2010	El Generico vs. Kevin Steen	Ring of Honor
2011	John Cena vs. CM Punk	World Wrestling Entertainment
2012	Hiroshi Tanahashi vs. Kazuchika Okada	New Japan Pro-Wrestling
2013	Hiroshi Tanahashi vs. Kazuchika Okada	New Japan Pro-Wrestling
2014	Jon Jones vs. Daniel Cormier	Ultimate Fighting Championship
2015	José Aldo vs. Conor McGregor	Ultimate Fighting Championship
2016	Conor McGregor vs. Nate Diaz	Ultimate Fighting Championship
2017	Kazuchika Okada vs. Kenny Omega	New Japan Pro-Wrestling
2018	Johnny Gargano vs. Tommaso Ciampa	WWE
2019	Adam Cole vs. Johnny Gargano	WWE
2020	Jon Moxley vs. Eddie Kingston	All Elite Wrestling
2021	Kenny Omega vs. "Hangman" Adam Page	All Elite Wrestling
2022	FTR vs. The Briscoes	Ring of Honor
2023	Kevin Owens and Sami Zayn vs. The Bloodline	WWE
2024	CM Punk vs. Drew McIntyre	WWE
2025	"Hangman" Adam Page vs. Jon Moxley	All Elite Wrestling

==== Most Improved ====
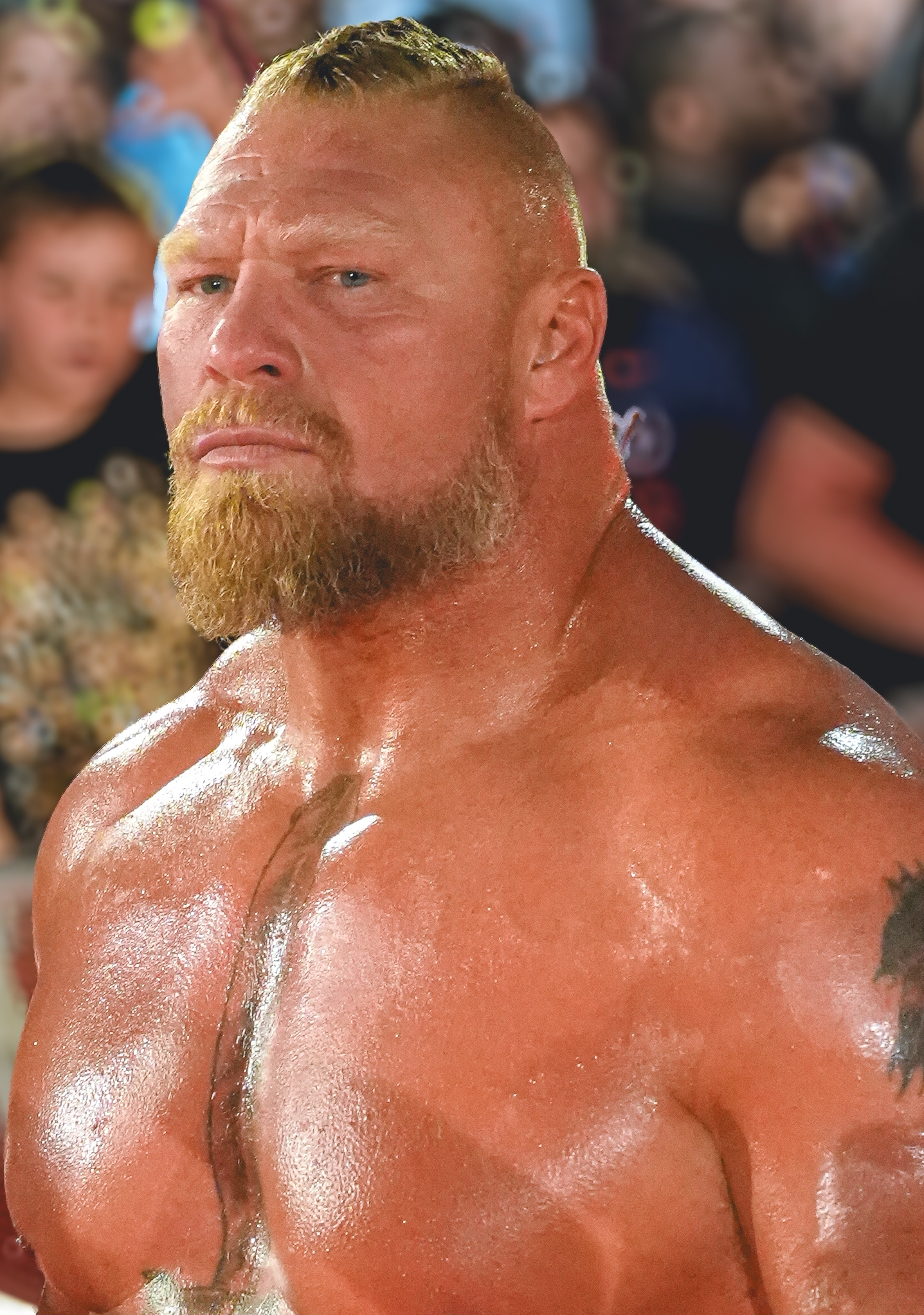
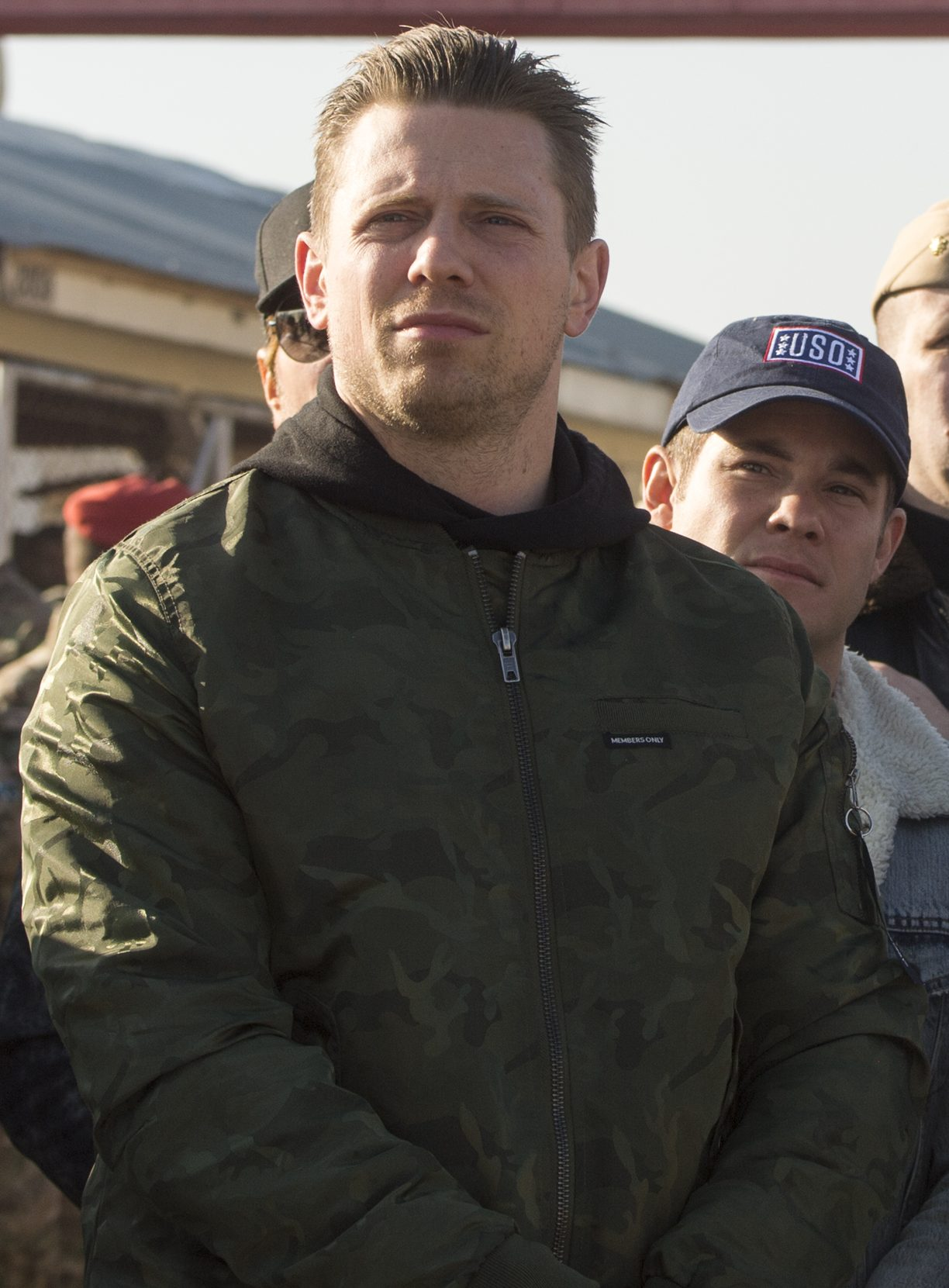
Brock Lesnar and The Miz are record two-time winners of the category.

Year	Wrestler	Promotion(s)
1980	Larry Zbyszko	World Wrestling Federation
1981	Adrian Adonis	American Wrestling Association
1982	Jim Duggan	Mid-South Wrestling
1983	Curt Hennig	American Wrestling Association; Pacific Northwest Wrestling; World Wrestling Federation
1984	The Cobra	New Japan Pro-Wrestling; Stampede Wrestling
1985	Steve Williams	Mid-South Wrestling
1986	Rick Steiner	Mid-South Wrestling
1987	Big Bubba Rogers	Universal Wrestling Federation
1988	Sting	Jim Crockett Promotions
1989	Lex Luger	World Championship Wrestling
1990	Kenta Kobashi	All Japan Pro Wrestling
1991	Dustin Rhodes	World Championship Wrestling
1992	El Samurai	New Japan Pro-Wrestling
1993	Tracy Smothers	Smoky Mountain Wrestling
1994	Diesel	World Wrestling Federation
1995	Johnny B. Badd	World Championship Wrestling
1996	Diamond Dallas Page	World Championship Wrestling
1997	Tatsuhito Takaiwa	New Japan Pro-Wrestling
1998	The Rock	World Wrestling Federation
1999	Vader	All Japan Pro Wrestling
2000	Kurt Angle	World Wrestling Federation
2001	Keiji Muto	New Japan Pro-Wrestling; All Japan Pro Wrestling
2002	Brock Lesnar	World Wrestling Entertainment
2003	Brock Lesnar	World Wrestling Entertainment
2004	Randy Orton	World Wrestling Entertainment
2005	Roderick Strong	Ring of Honor
2006	Takeshi Morishima	Pro Wrestling Noah
2007	Montel Vontavious Porter	World Wrestling Entertainment/WWE
2008	The Miz	World Wrestling Entertainment/WWE
2009	The Miz	World Wrestling Entertainment/WWE
2010	Sheamus	World Wrestling Entertainment/WWE
2011	Dolph Ziggler	World Wrestling Entertainment/WWE
2012	Kazuchika Okada	New Japan Pro-Wrestling
2013	Roman Reigns	WWE
2014	Rusev	WWE
2015	Bayley	WWE
2016	Matt Riddle	Evolve; Pro Wrestling Guerrilla
2017	Braun Strowman	WWE
2018	Adam Page	New Japan Pro-Wrestling; Ring of Honor
2019	Lance Archer	New Japan Pro-Wrestling
2020	Britt Baker	All Elite Wrestling
2021	Tay Conti	All Elite Wrestling
2022	The Acclaimed	All Elite Wrestling
2023	Julia Hart	All Elite Wrestling
2024	Kyle Fletcher	All Elite Wrestling
2025	Harley Cameron	All Elite Wrestling

==== Most Charismatic ====
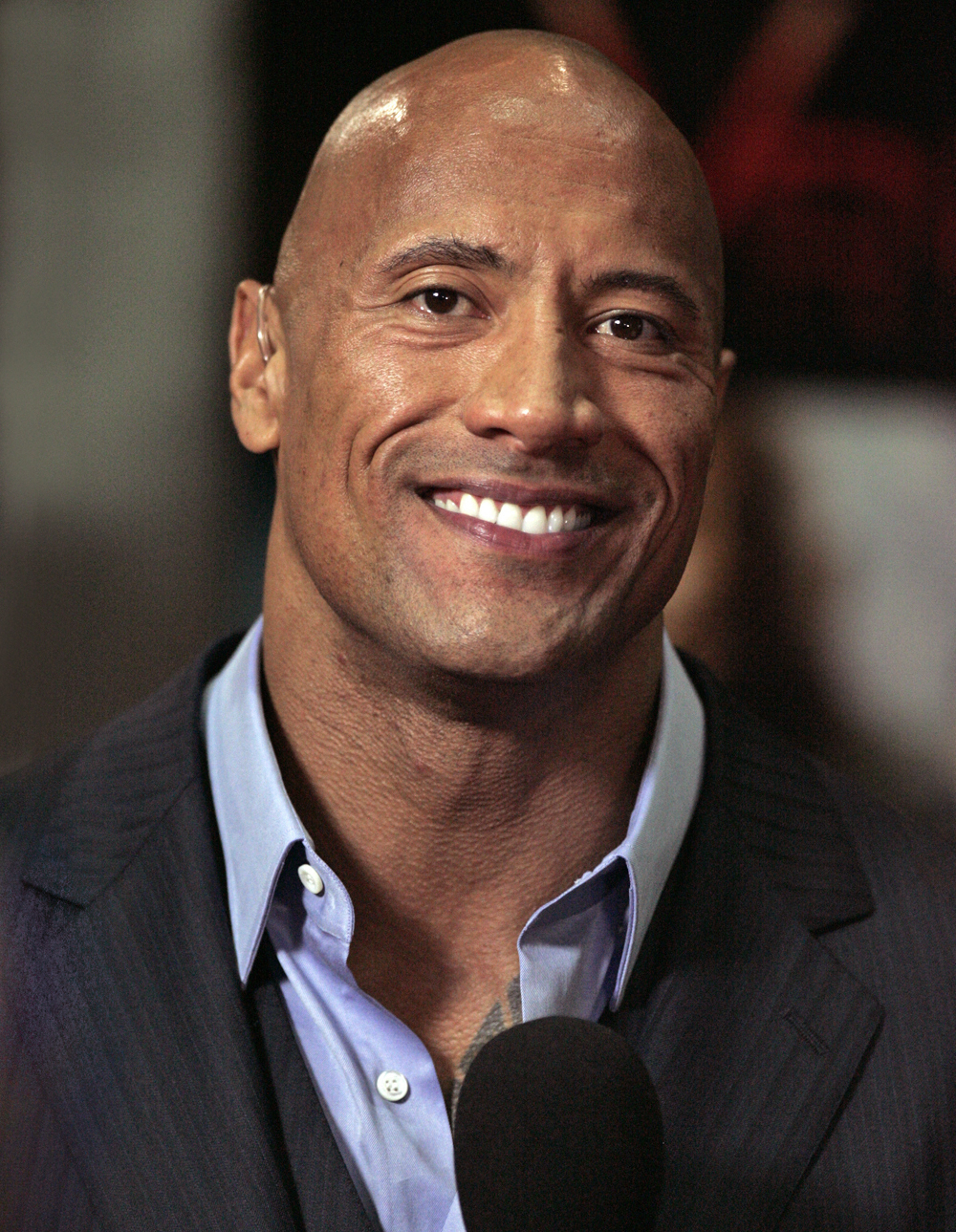
The Rock is a seven-time winner of the category.

Year	Performer	Promotion(s)
1980	Ric Flair	National Wrestling Alliance
1981	Michael Hayes	World Class Championship Wrestling
1982	Ric Flair	National Wrestling Alliance
1982	Dusty Rhodes	National Wrestling Alliance
1983	Ric Flair	National Wrestling Alliance
1984	Ric Flair	National Wrestling Alliance
1985	Hulk Hogan	World Wrestling Federation
1986	Hulk Hogan	World Wrestling Federation
1987	Hulk Hogan	World Wrestling Federation
1988	Sting	World Championship Wrestling
1989	Hulk Hogan	World Wrestling Federation
1990	Hulk Hogan	World Wrestling Federation
1991	Hulk Hogan	World Wrestling Federation
1992	Sting	World Championship Wrestling
1993	Ric Flair	World Wrestling Federation; World Championship Wrestling
1994	Atsushi Onita	Frontier Martial-Arts Wrestling
1995	Shawn Michaels	World Wrestling Federation/Entertainment
1996	Shawn Michaels	World Wrestling Federation/Entertainment
1997	Stone Cold Steve Austin	World Wrestling Federation/Entertainment
1998	Stone Cold Steve Austin	World Wrestling Federation/Entertainment
1999	The Rock	World Wrestling Federation/Entertainment
2000	The Rock	World Wrestling Federation/Entertainment
2001	The Rock	World Wrestling Federation/Entertainment
2002	The Rock	World Wrestling Federation/Entertainment
2003	Bob Sapp	New Japan Pro-Wrestling; K-1
2004	Eddie Guerrero	World Wrestling Entertainment/WWE
2005	Eddie Guerrero	World Wrestling Entertainment/WWE
2006	John Cena	World Wrestling Entertainment/WWE
2007	John Cena	World Wrestling Entertainment/WWE
2008	John Cena	World Wrestling Entertainment/WWE
2009	John Cena	World Wrestling Entertainment/WWE
2010	John Cena	World Wrestling Entertainment/WWE
2011	The Rock	World Wrestling Entertainment/WWE
2012	The Rock	World Wrestling Entertainment/WWE
2013	Hiroshi Tanahashi	New Japan Pro-Wrestling
2014	Shinsuke Nakamura	New Japan Pro-Wrestling
2015	Shinsuke Nakamura	New Japan Pro-Wrestling
2016	Conor McGregor	Ultimate Fighting Championship
2017	Tetsuya Naito	New Japan Pro-Wrestling
2018	Tetsuya Naito	New Japan Pro-Wrestling
2019	Chris Jericho	All Elite Wrestling; New Japan Pro-Wrestling
2020	MJF	All Elite Wrestling
2021	CM Punk	All Elite Wrestling
2022	MJF	All Elite Wrestling
2023	MJF	All Elite Wrestling
2024	The Rock	WWE
2025	John Cena	WWE

==== Bryan Danielson Award (Best Technical Wrestler) ====
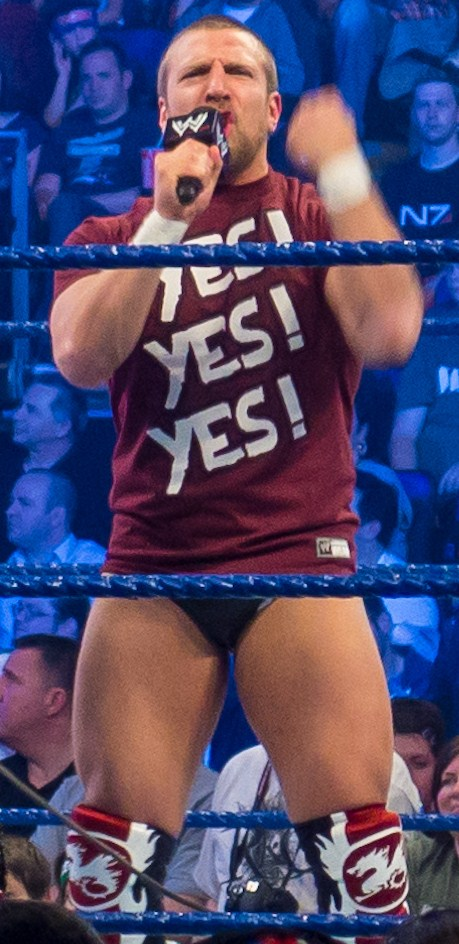
Bryan Danielson/Daniel Bryan is a 12-time winner and namesake of this category.

Year	Wrestler	Promotion(s)
1980	Bob Backlund	World Wrestling Federation
1981	Ted DiBiase	Mid-South Wrestling
1982	Tiger Mask	New Japan Pro-Wrestling; World Wrestling Federation
1983	Tiger Mask	New Japan Pro-Wrestling; World Wrestling Federation
1984	Dynamite Kid	Stampede Wrestling; New Japan Pro-Wrestling; World Wrestling Federation
1984	Masa Saito	American Wrestling Association; New Japan Pro-Wrestling
1985	Tatsumi Fujinami	New Japan Pro-Wrestling; World Wrestling Federation
1986	Tatsumi Fujinami	New Japan Pro-Wrestling; World Wrestling Federation
1987	Nobuhiko Takada	New Japan Pro-Wrestling
1988	Tatsumi Fujinami	New Japan Pro-Wrestling
1989	Jushin Liger/Jushin Thunder Liger	New Japan Pro-Wrestling
1990	Jushin Liger/Jushin Thunder Liger	New Japan Pro-Wrestling
1991	Jushin Liger/Jushin Thunder Liger	New Japan Pro-Wrestling; World Championship Wrestling
1992	Jushin Liger/Jushin Thunder Liger	New Japan Pro-Wrestling; World Championship Wrestling
1993	Hiroshi Hase	New Japan Pro-Wrestling
1994	Chris Benoit	Extreme Championship Wrestling; New Japan Pro-Wrestling
1995	Chris Benoit	Extreme Championship Wrestling; New Japan Pro-Wrestling; World Championship Wrestling
1996	Dean Malenko	New Japan Pro-Wrestling; World Championship Wrestling
1997	Dean Malenko	New Japan Pro-Wrestling; World Championship Wrestling
1998	Kiyoshi Tamura	Fighting Network Rings
1999	Shinjiro Otani	New Japan Pro-Wrestling
2000	Chris Benoit	World Championship Wrestling; World Wrestling Federation
2001	Minoru Tanaka	New Japan Pro-Wrestling
2002	Kurt Angle	World Wrestling Entertainment
2003	Chris Benoit	World Wrestling Entertainment
2004	Chris Benoit	World Wrestling Entertainment
2005	Bryan Danielson/Daniel Bryan	Ring of Honor
2006	Bryan Danielson/Daniel Bryan	Ring of Honor
2007	Bryan Danielson/Daniel Bryan	Ring of Honor
2008	Bryan Danielson/Daniel Bryan	Ring of Honor
2009	Bryan Danielson/Daniel Bryan	Dragon Gate USA; Ring of Honor
2010	Bryan Danielson/Daniel Bryan	Chikara; Dragon Gate USA; Evolve; World Wrestling Entertainment
2011	Bryan Danielson/Daniel Bryan	WWE
2012	Bryan Danielson/Daniel Bryan	WWE
2013	Bryan Danielson/Daniel Bryan	WWE
2014	Zack Sabre Jr.	Progress Wrestling; Pro Wrestling Guerrilla; Pro Wrestling Noah; Westside Xtreme Wrestling
2015	Zack Sabre Jr.	Progress Wrestling; Pro Wrestling Guerrilla; Pro Wrestling Noah; Westside Xtreme Wrestling
2016	Zack Sabre Jr.	Progress Wrestling; Pro Wrestling Guerrilla; Revolution Pro Wrestling; Westside Xtreme Wrestling
2017	Zack Sabre Jr.	New Japan Pro-Wrestling; Progress Wrestling; Pro Wrestling Guerrilla; Revolution Pro Wrestling
2018	Zack Sabre Jr.	New Japan Pro-Wrestling; Progress Wrestling; Pro Wrestling Guerrilla; Revolution Pro Wrestling
2019	Zack Sabre Jr.	New Japan Pro-Wrestling; Revolution Pro Wrestling
2020	Zack Sabre Jr.	New Japan Pro-Wrestling
2021	Daniel Bryan/Bryan Danielson	WWE; All Elite Wrestling
2022	Daniel Bryan/Bryan Danielson	All Elite Wrestling
2023	Daniel Bryan/Bryan Danielson	All Elite Wrestling
2024	Zack Sabre Jr.	New Japan Pro-Wrestling
2025	Zack Sabre Jr.	New Japan Pro-Wrestling

==== Bruiser Brody Memorial Award (Best Brawler) ====
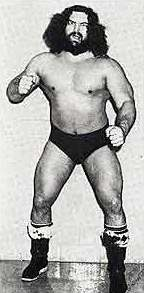
Bruiser Brody is the inaugural recipient, seven-time winner and namesake of the category.

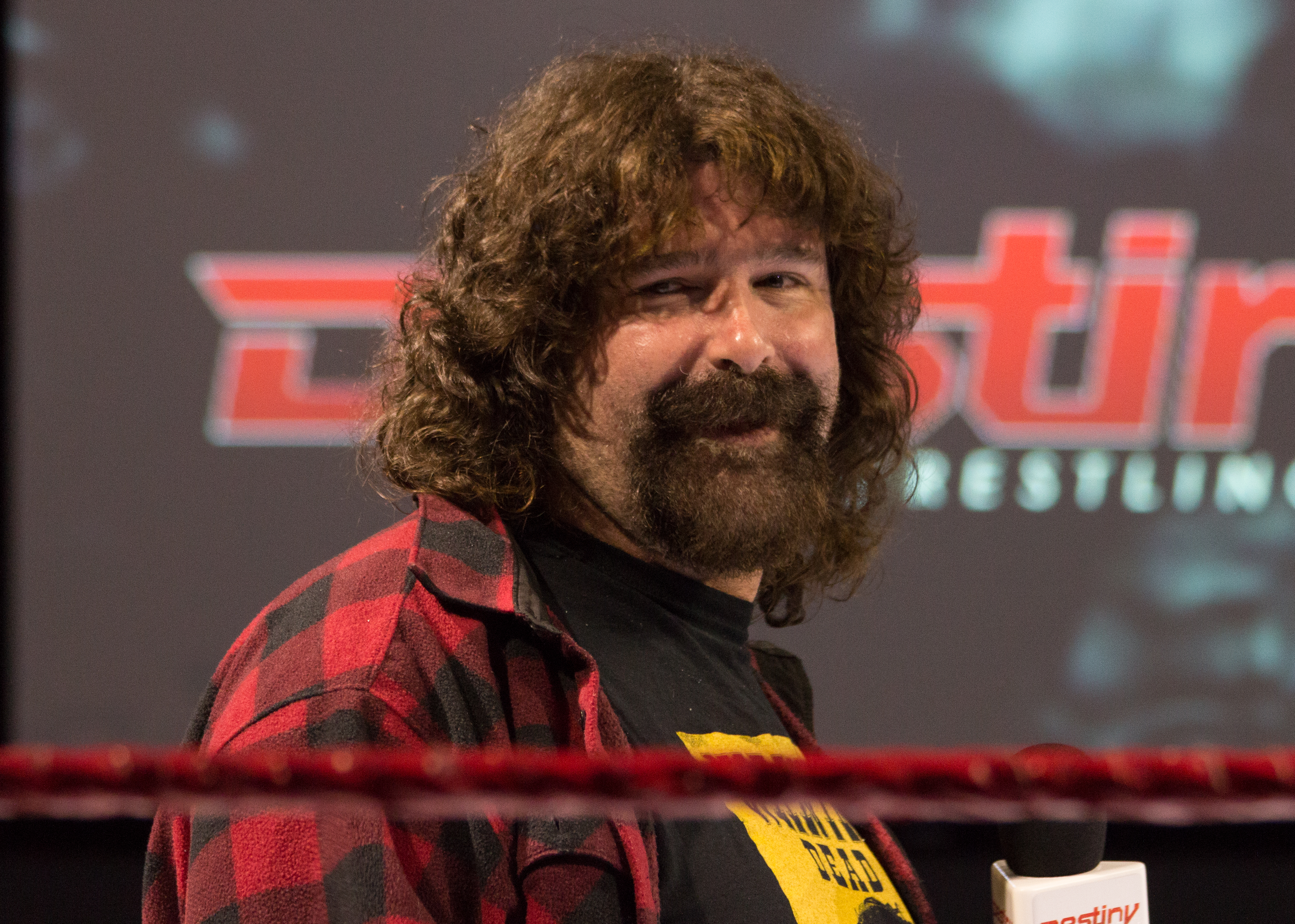
Mick Foley is 10-time winner of the category in a 10 year streak from 1991 to 2000.

Year	Wrestler	Promotion(s)
1980	Bruiser Brody	All Japan Pro Wrestling; World Wrestling Council/Capitol Sports Promotions; National Wrestling Association
1981	Bruiser Brody	All Japan Pro Wrestling; World Wrestling Council/Capitol Sports Promotions; National Wrestling Association
1982	Bruiser Brody	All Japan Pro Wrestling; World Wrestling Council/Capitol Sports Promotions; National Wrestling Association
1983	Bruiser Brody	All Japan Pro Wrestling; World Wrestling Council/Capitol Sports Promotions; National Wrestling Association
1984	Bruiser Brody	All Japan Pro Wrestling; World Wrestling Council/Capitol Sports Promotions; National Wrestling Association
1985	Stan Hansen	All Japan Pro Wrestling; National Wrestling Alliance
1986	Terry Gordy	All Japan Pro Wrestling; Universal Wrestling Federation
1987	Bruiser Brody	World Wrestling Council; World Class Championship Wrestling
1988	Bruiser Brody	World Wrestling Council; World Class Championship Wrestling
1989	Terry Funk	World Championship Wrestling
1990	Stan Hansen	All Japan Pro Wrestling
1991	Cactus Jack/Dude Love/Mankind/Mick Foley	World Championship Wrestling
1992	Cactus Jack/Dude Love/Mankind/Mick Foley	World Championship Wrestling
1993	Cactus Jack/Dude Love/Mankind/Mick Foley	World Championship Wrestling; Extreme Championship Wrestling
1994	Cactus Jack/Dude Love/Mankind/Mick Foley	Extreme Championship Wrestling; International Wrestling Association of Japan
1995	Cactus Jack/Dude Love/Mankind/Mick Foley	Extreme Championship Wrestling; International Wrestling Association of Japan
1996	Cactus Jack/Dude Love/Mankind/Mick Foley	World Wrestling Federation
1997	Cactus Jack/Dude Love/Mankind/Mick Foley	World Wrestling Federation
1998	Cactus Jack/Dude Love/Mankind/Mick Foley	World Wrestling Federation
1999	Cactus Jack/Dude Love/Mankind/Mick Foley	World Wrestling Federation
2000	Cactus Jack/Dude Love/Mankind/Mick Foley	World Wrestling Federation
2001	Stone Cold Steve Austin	World Wrestling Federation
2002	Yoshihiro Takayama	Pro Wrestling Noah
2003	Brock Lesnar	World Wrestling Entertainment
2004	Chris Benoit	World Wrestling Entertainment
2005	Samoa Joe	Ring of Honor; Total Nonstop Action Wrestling
2006	Samoa Joe	Ring of Honor; Total Nonstop Action Wrestling
2007	Takeshi Morishima	Ring of Honor; Pro Wrestling Noah
2008	Necro Butcher	Ring of Honor; Combat Zone Wrestling
2009	Necro Butcher	Ring of Honor; Combat Zone Wrestling
2010	Kevin Steen	Ring of Honor; Pro Wrestling Guerrilla
2011	Kevin Steen	Pro Wrestling Guerrilla
2012	Kevin Steen	Ring of Honor; Pro Wrestling Guerrilla
2013	Katsuyori Shibata	New Japan Pro-Wrestling
2014	Tomohiro Ishii	New Japan Pro-Wrestling
2015	Tomohiro Ishii	New Japan Pro-Wrestling
2016	Tomohiro Ishii	New Japan Pro-Wrestling
2017	Tomohiro Ishii	New Japan Pro-Wrestling
2018	Tomohiro Ishii	New Japan Pro-Wrestling
2019	Tomohiro Ishii	New Japan Pro-Wrestling
2020	Jon Moxley	All Elite Wrestling; New Japan Pro-Wrestling
2021	Jon Moxley	All Elite Wrestling; New Japan Pro-Wrestling
2022	Jon Moxley	All Elite Wrestling; New Japan Pro-Wrestling
2023	Jon Moxley	All Elite Wrestling; New Japan Pro-Wrestling
2024	"Hangman" Adam Page	All Elite Wrestling
2025	Jon Moxley	All Elite Wrestling

==== Best Flying Wrestler ====
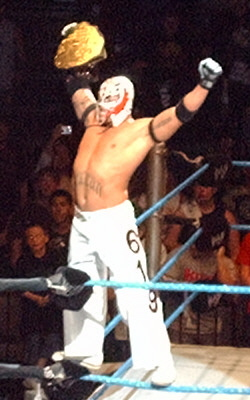
Rey Mysterio (aka Rey Misterio Jr.) is a six-time winner of the category.

Year	Wrestler	Promotion(s)
1981	Jimmy Snuka	World Wrestling Federation
1982	Tiger Mask	New Japan Pro-Wrestling; National Wrestling Alliance; World Wrestling Federation
1983	Tiger Mask	New Japan Pro-Wrestling; National Wrestling Alliance; World Wrestling Federation
1984	Dynamite Kid	New Japan Pro-Wrestling; National Wrestling Alliance; World Wrestling Federation
1985	Tiger Mask II	All Japan Pro Wrestling
1986	Tiger Mask II	All Japan Pro Wrestling
1987	Owen Hart	New Japan Pro-Wrestling; Stampede Wrestling; World Wrestling Federation
1988	Owen Hart	New Japan Pro-Wrestling; Stampede Wrestling; World Wrestling Federation
1989	Jushin Liger/Jushin Thunder Liger	New Japan Pro-Wrestling; All Star Wrestling; BWF
1990	Jushin Liger/Jushin Thunder Liger	New Japan Pro-Wrestling; All Star Wrestling; BWF
1991	Jushin Liger/Jushin Thunder Liger	New Japan Pro-Wrestling; All Star Wrestling; BWF
1992	Jushin Liger/Jushin Thunder Liger	New Japan Pro-Wrestling; World Championship Wrestling
1993	Jushin Liger/Jushin Thunder Liger	New Japan Pro-Wrestling; World Championship Wrestling
1994	The Great Sasuke	Michinoku Pro Wrestling; New Japan Pro-Wrestling
1995	Rey Misterio Jr.	Asistencia Asesoría y Administración; Extreme Championship Wrestling
1996	Rey Misterio Jr.	Extreme Championship Wrestling; World Championship Wrestling
1997	Rey Misterio Jr.	World Championship Wrestling
1998	Juventud Guerrera	World Championship Wrestling; AAA
1999	Juventud Guerrera	World Championship Wrestling; AAA
2000	Jeff Hardy	World Wrestling Federation
2001	Dragon Kid	Toryumon Japan
2002	Rey Mysterio	World Wrestling Entertainment
2003	Rey Mysterio	World Wrestling Entertainment
2004	Rey Mysterio	World Wrestling Entertainment
2005	AJ Styles	Ring of Honor; Total Nonstop Action Wrestling
2006	Místico	Consejo Mundial de Lucha Libre
2007	Místico	Consejo Mundial de Lucha Libre
2008	Evan Bourne	World Wrestling Entertainment
2009	Kota Ibushi	DDT Pro-Wrestling
2010	Kota Ibushi	DDT Pro-Wrestling
2011	Ricochet	Dragon Gate; Pro Wrestling Guerrilla
2012	Kota Ibushi	DDT Pro-Wrestling
2013	Kota Ibushi	DDT Pro-Wrestling; New Japan Pro-Wrestling
2014	Ricochet	Dragon Gate; Lucha Underground; Pro Wrestling Guerrilla
2015	Ricochet	Dragon Gate; Lucha Underground; Pro Wrestling Guerrilla
2016	Will Ospreay	Progress Wrestling; Revolution Pro Wrestling; New Japan Pro-Wrestling; Ring of Honor
2017	Will Ospreay	Progress Wrestling; Revolution Pro Wrestling; New Japan Pro-Wrestling; Ring of Honor
2018	Will Ospreay	Progress Wrestling; Revolution Pro Wrestling; New Japan Pro-Wrestling; Ring of Honor
2019	Will Ospreay	New Japan Pro-Wrestling
2020	Rey Fénix	All Elite Wrestling; Lucha Libre AAA Worldwide
2021	Rey Fénix	All Elite Wrestling
2022	El Hijo del Vikingo	Lucha Libre AAA Worldwide
2023	El Hijo del Vikingo	Lucha Libre AAA Worldwide
2024	Will Ospreay	New Japan Pro-Wrestling; All Elite Wrestling
2025	Máscara Dorada	Consejo Mundial de Lucha Libre

==== Most Overrated ====
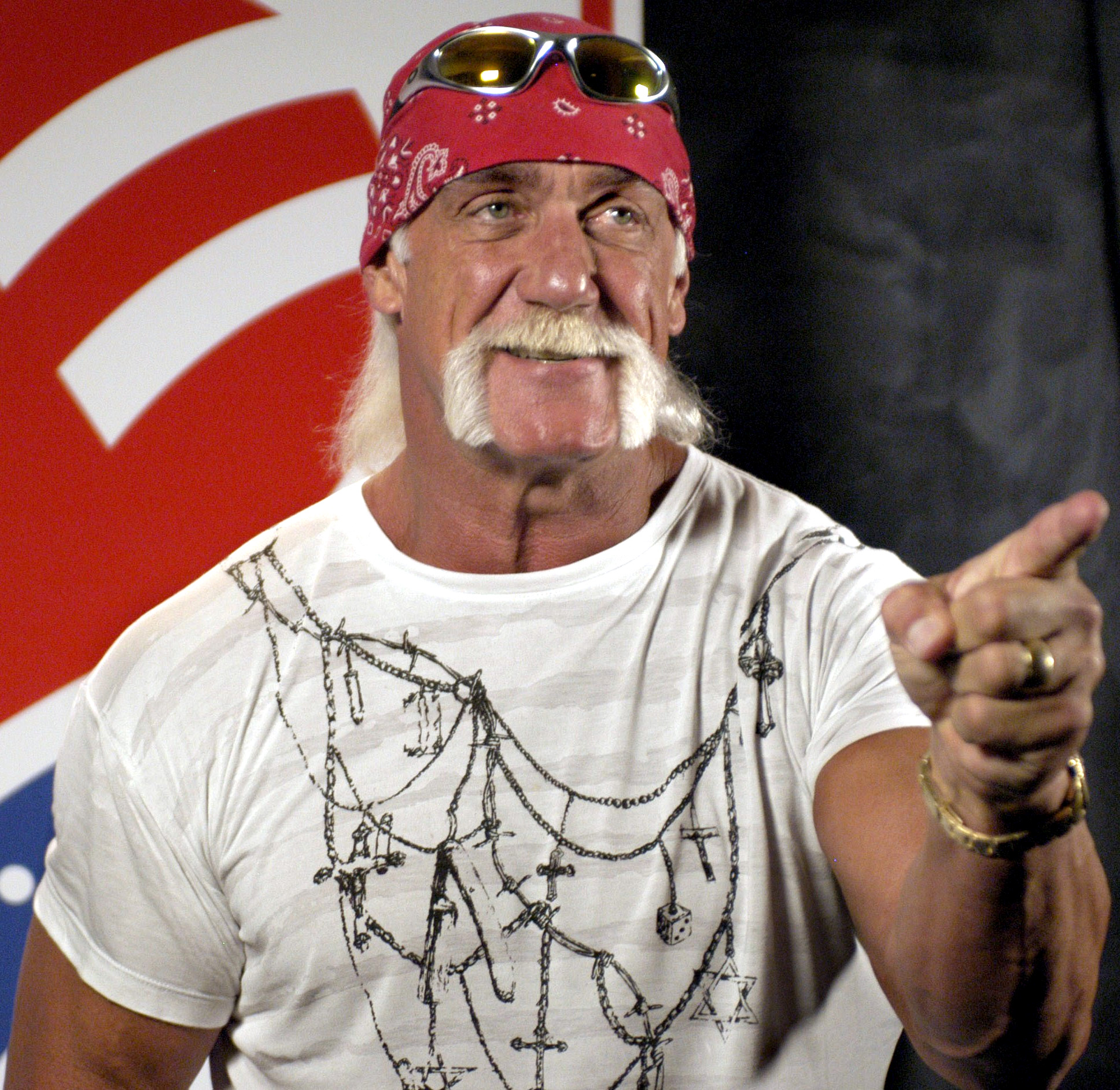
Hulk Hogan is a seven-time winner of the category.

Year	Wrestler	Promotion(s)
1980	Mr. Wrestling II	National Wrestling Alliance
1981	Pedro Morales	World Wrestling Federation
1982	Pedro Morales	World Wrestling Federation
1983	Bob Backlund	World Wrestling Federation
1984	Big John Studd	World Wrestling Federation
1985	Hulk Hogan	World Wrestling Federation
1986	Hulk Hogan	World Wrestling Federation
1987	Dusty Rhodes	Jim Crockett Promotions
1988	Dusty Rhodes	Jim Crockett Promotions
1989	Ultimate Warrior	World Wrestling Federation
1990	Ultimate Warrior	World Wrestling Federation
1991	Ultimate Warrior	World Wrestling Federation
1992	Erik Watts	World Championship Wrestling
1993	Sid Vicious	World Championship Wrestling
1994	Hulk/Hollywood Hogan	World Championship Wrestling
1995	Hulk/Hollywood Hogan	World Championship Wrestling
1996	Hulk/Hollywood Hogan	World Championship Wrestling
1997	Hulk/Hollywood Hogan	World Championship Wrestling
1998	Hulk/Hollywood Hogan	World Championship Wrestling
1999	Kevin Nash	World Championship Wrestling
2000	Kevin Nash	World Championship Wrestling
2001	The Undertaker	World Wrestling Federation/Entertainment
2002	Triple H	World Wrestling Federation/Entertainment
2003	Triple H	World Wrestling Federation/Entertainment
2004	Triple H	World Wrestling Federation/Entertainment
2005	Jeff Jarrett	Total Nonstop Action Wrestling
2006	Batista	World Wrestling Entertainment
2007	The Great Khali	World Wrestling Entertainment
2008	Vladimir Kozlov	World Wrestling Entertainment
2009	Triple H	World Wrestling Entertainment
2010	Kane	World Wrestling Entertainment
2011	Crimson	Total Nonstop Action Wrestling
2012	Ryback	WWE
2013	Randy Orton	WWE
2014	Kane	WWE
2015	Kane	WWE
2016	Roman Reigns	WWE
2017	Jinder Mahal	WWE
2018	Baron Corbin/King Corbin	WWE
2019	Baron Corbin/King Corbin	WWE
2020	Bray Wyatt	WWE
2021	Evil	New Japan Pro-Wrestling
2022	Ronda Rousey	WWE
2023	Sanada	New Japan Pro-Wrestling
2024	Nia Jax	WWE
2025	Jey Uso	WWE

==== Most Underrated ====
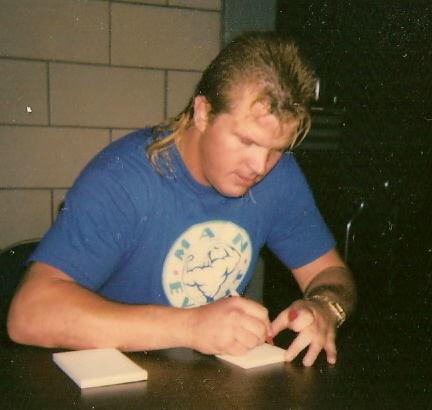
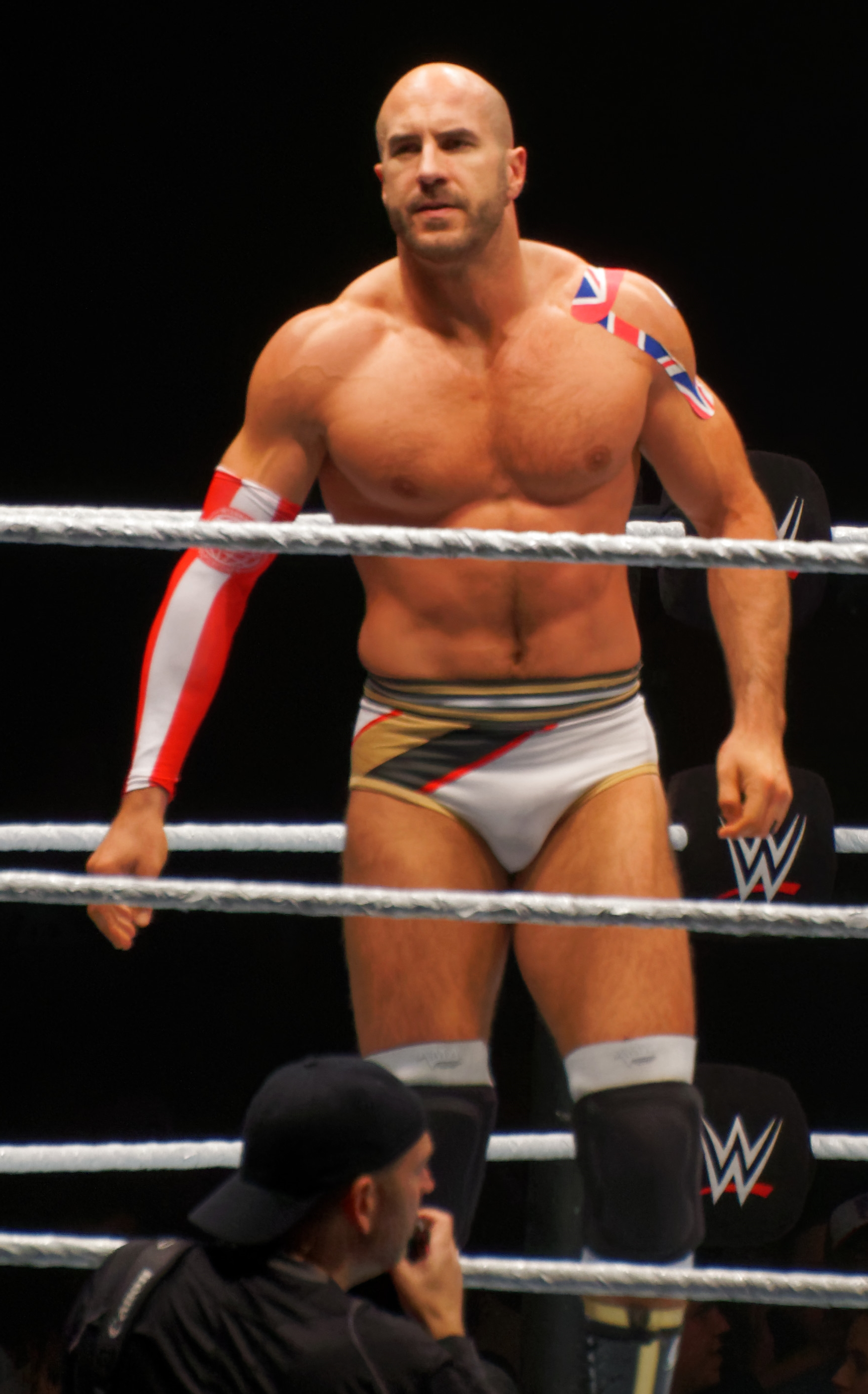
Bobby Eaton and Cesaro, the latter now known as Claudio Castagnoli, are four-time winners each of the category consecutively.

Year	Wrestler	Promotion(s)
1980	Hossein Arab	National Wrestling Alliance; World Wrestling Federation
1981	Buzz Sawyer	National Wrestling Alliance
1982	Adrian Adonis	American Wrestling Association
1983	Dynamite Kid	New Japan Pro-Wrestling; Stampede Wrestling; World Wrestling Federation
1984	B. Brian Blair	World Wrestling Federation
1985	Bobby Eaton	Jim Crockett Promotions
1986	Bobby Eaton	Jim Crockett Promotions
1987	Brad Armstrong	Jim Crockett Promotions
1988	Tiger Mask II	All Japan Pro Wrestling
1989	Dan Kroffat	All Japan Pro Wrestling
1990	Bobby Eaton	World Championship Wrestling
1991	Terry Taylor	World Championship Wrestling
1992	Terry Taylor	World Championship Wrestling
1993	Bobby Eaton	World Championship Wrestling
1994	Brian Pillman	World Championship Wrestling
1995	Skip	World Wrestling Federation
1996	Leif Cassidy	World Wrestling Federation
1997	Flash Funk	World Wrestling Federation
1998	Chris Benoit	World Championship Wrestling
1999	Chris Jericho	World Championship Wrestling; World Wrestling Federation
2000	Chris Jericho	World Wrestling Federation
2001	Lance Storm	World Wrestling Federation; World Championship Wrestling
2002	Booker T	World Wrestling Entertainment/WWE
2003	Último Dragón	World Wrestling Entertainment/WWE
2004	Paul London	World Wrestling Entertainment/WWE
2005	Shelton Benjamin	World Wrestling Entertainment/WWE
2006	Shelton Benjamin	World Wrestling Entertainment/WWE
2007	Shelton Benjamin	World Wrestling Entertainment/WWE
2008	Montel Vontavious Porter	World Wrestling Entertainment/WWE
2009	Evan Bourne	World Wrestling Entertainment/WWE
2010	Kaval	World Wrestling Entertainment/WWE
2011	Dolph Ziggler	World Wrestling Entertainment/WWE
2012	Tyson Kidd	World Wrestling Entertainment/WWE
2013	(Antonio) Cesaro	World Wrestling Entertainment/WWE
2014	(Antonio) Cesaro	World Wrestling Entertainment/WWE
2015	(Antonio) Cesaro	World Wrestling Entertainment/WWE
2016	(Antonio) Cesaro	World Wrestling Entertainment/WWE
2017	Rusev	World Wrestling Entertainment/WWE
2018	Finn Bálor	World Wrestling Entertainment/WWE
2019	Shorty G	World Wrestling Entertainment/WWE
2020	Ricochet	World Wrestling Entertainment/WWE
2021	Ricochet	World Wrestling Entertainment/WWE
2022	Konosuke Takeshita	All Elite Wrestling; DDT Pro Wrestling
2023	Chad Gable	WWE
2024	Konosuke Takeshita	All Elite Wrestling; DDT Pro Wrestling
2025	The Beast Mortos	All Elite Wrestling; Ring of Honor

==== Rookie of the Year ====
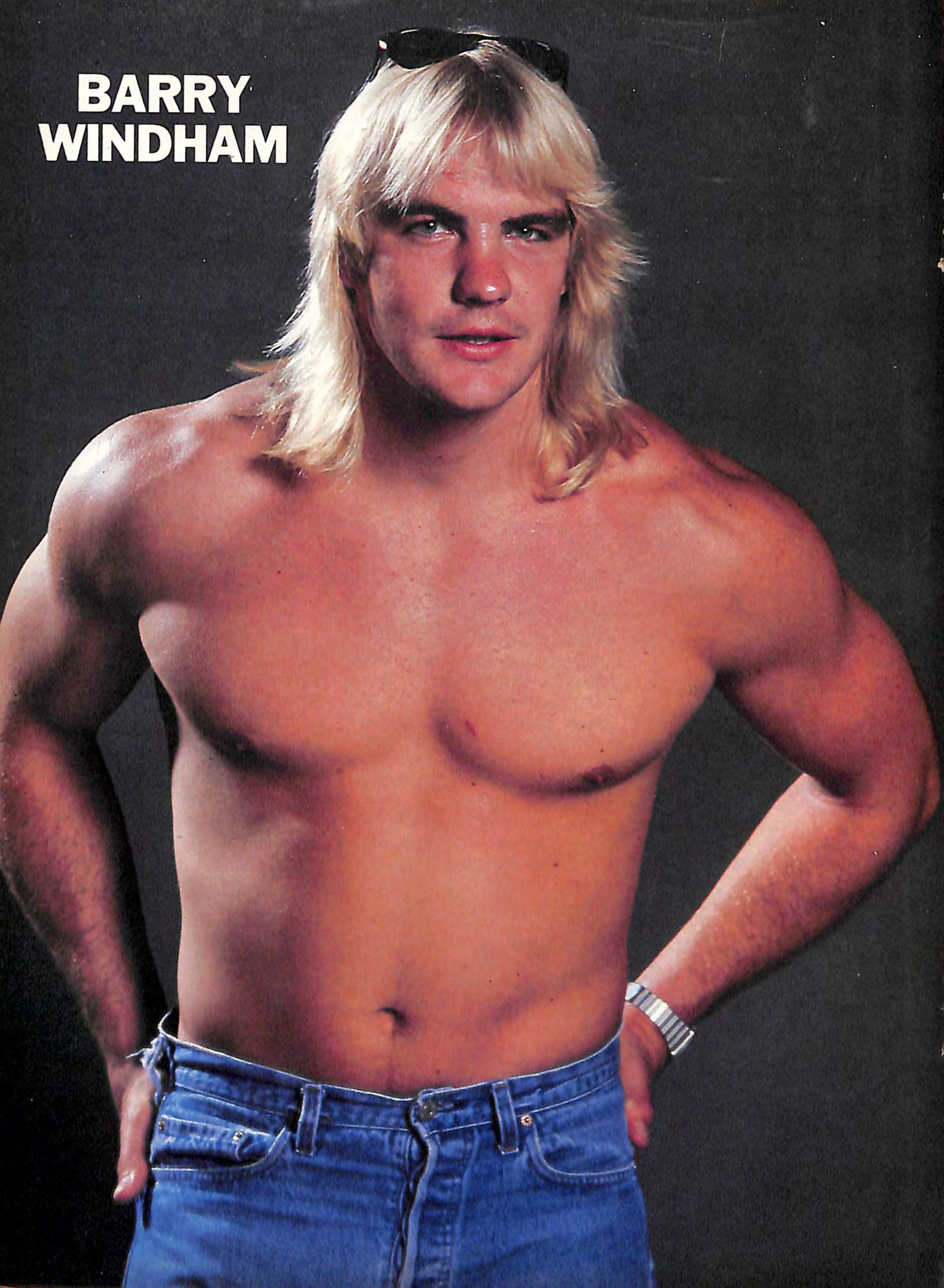
Barry Windham was the inaugural winner of the award in 1980.

Year	Wrestler	Promotion(s)
1980	Barry Windham	National Wrestling Alliance
1981	Brad Armstrong	National Wrestling Alliance
1981	Brad Rheingans	National Wrestling Alliance
1982	Steve Williams	National Wrestling Alliance
1983	The Road Warriors	National Wrestling Alliance
1984	Tom Zenk	AWA
1984	Keiichi Yamada	New Japan Pro-Wrestling
1985	Jack Victory	National Wrestling Alliance
1986	Bam Bam Bigelow	Continental Wrestling Association
1987	Brian Pillman	Stampede Wrestling
1988	Gary Albright	Stampede Wrestling
1989	Dustin Rhodes	World Championship Wrestling
1990	Steve Austin	United States Wrestling Association
1991	Johnny B. Badd	World Championship Wrestling
1992	Rey Misterio Jr.	Asistencia Asesoría y Administración
1993	Jun Akiyama	All Japan Pro Wrestling
1994	Mikey Whipwreck	Extreme Championship Wrestling
1995	Perro Aguayo Jr.	Consejo Mundial de Lucha Libre
1996	The Giant	World Championship Wrestling
1997	Mr. Águila	Consejo Mundial de Lucha Libre
1998	Goldberg	World Championship Wrestling
1999	Blitzkrieg	World Championship Wrestling
2000	Sean O'Haire	World Championship Wrestling
2001	El Hombre Sin Nombre	Consejo Mundial de Lucha Libre
2002	Bob Sapp	K-1
2003	Chris Sabin	Total Nonstop Action Wrestling; Ring of Honor; Pro Wrestling Zero-One Max
2004	Petey Williams	Total Nonstop Action Wrestling
2005	Shingo Takagi	Dragon Gate
2006	Atsushi Aoki	Pro Wrestling Noah
2007	Erick Stevens	Ring of Honor
2008	Kai	All Japan Pro Wrestling
2009	Frightmare	Chikara
2010	Adam Cole	Ring of Honor; Combat Zone Wrestling
2011	Daichi Hashimoto	Pro Wrestling Zero1
2012	Dinastía	Lucha Libre AAA Worldwide
2013	Yohei Komatsu	New Japan Pro-Wrestling
2014	Dragon Lee	Consejo Mundial de Lucha Libre
2015	Chad Gable	WWE
2016	Matt Riddle	Evolve; Pro Wrestling Guerrilla
2017	Katsuya Kitamura	New Japan Pro-Wrestling
2018	Ronda Rousey	WWE
2019	Jungle Boy	All Elite Wrestling
2020	Pat McAfee	WWE
2021	Jade Cargill	All Elite Wrestling
2022	Bron Breakker	WWE
2023	Yuma Anzai	All Japan Pro Wrestling
2024	Je'Von Evans	WWE
2025	Seri Yamaoka	Dream Star Fighting Marigold

==== Best Non-Wrestler ====
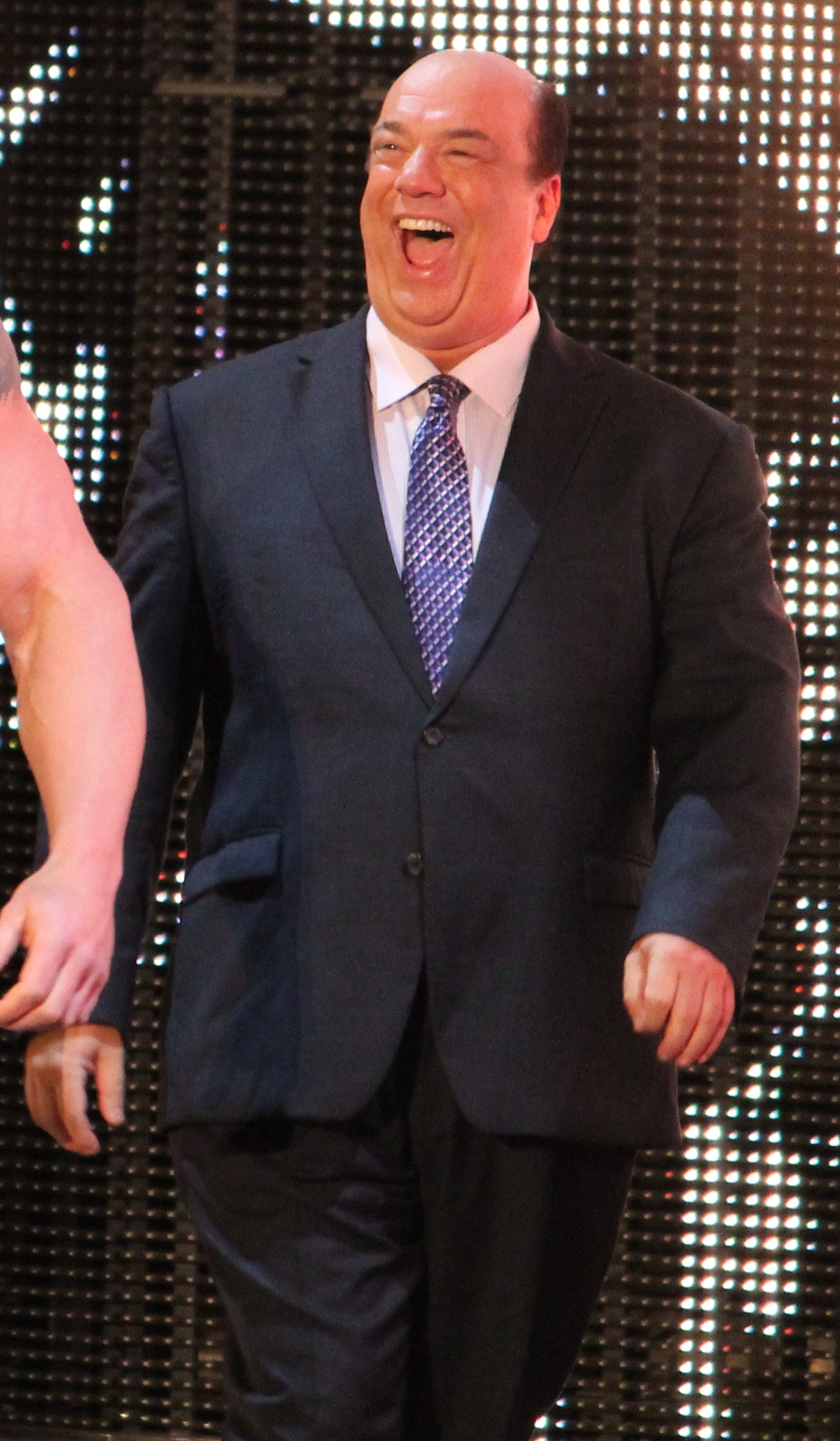
Paul Heyman is an eleven-time winner of the category.

Year	Performer	Promotion(s)
1999	Vince McMahon	World Wrestling Federation/Entertainment
2000	Vince McMahon	World Wrestling Federation/Entertainment
2001	Paul Heyman	World Wrestling Federation/Entertainment
2002	Paul Heyman	World Wrestling Federation/Entertainment
2003	Stone Cold Steve Austin	World Wrestling Federation/Entertainment
2004	Paul Heyman	World Wrestling Federation/Entertainment
2005	Eric Bischoff	World Wrestling Federation/Entertainment
2006	Jim Cornette	Total Nonstop Action Wrestling; Ring of Honor
2007	Larry Sweeney	Ring of Honor
2008	Larry Sweeney	Ring of Honor
2009	Vickie Guerrero	World Wrestling Entertainment/WWE
2010	Vickie Guerrero	World Wrestling Entertainment/WWE
2011	Ricardo Rodriguez	World Wrestling Entertainment/WWE
2012	Paul Heyman	World Wrestling Entertainment/WWE
2013	Paul Heyman	World Wrestling Entertainment/WWE
2014	Paul Heyman	World Wrestling Entertainment/WWE
2015	Dario Cueto	Lucha Underground
2016	Dario Cueto	Lucha Underground
2017	Daniel Bryan	WWE
2018	Paul Heyman	WWE
2019	Paul Heyman	WWE
2020	Taz	All Elite Wrestling
2021	Paul Heyman	WWE
2022	Paul Heyman	WWE
2023	Don Callis	All Elite Wrestling
2024	Paul Heyman	WWE
2025	Don Callis	All Elite Wrestling

==== Jim Ross Award (Best Television Announcer) ====
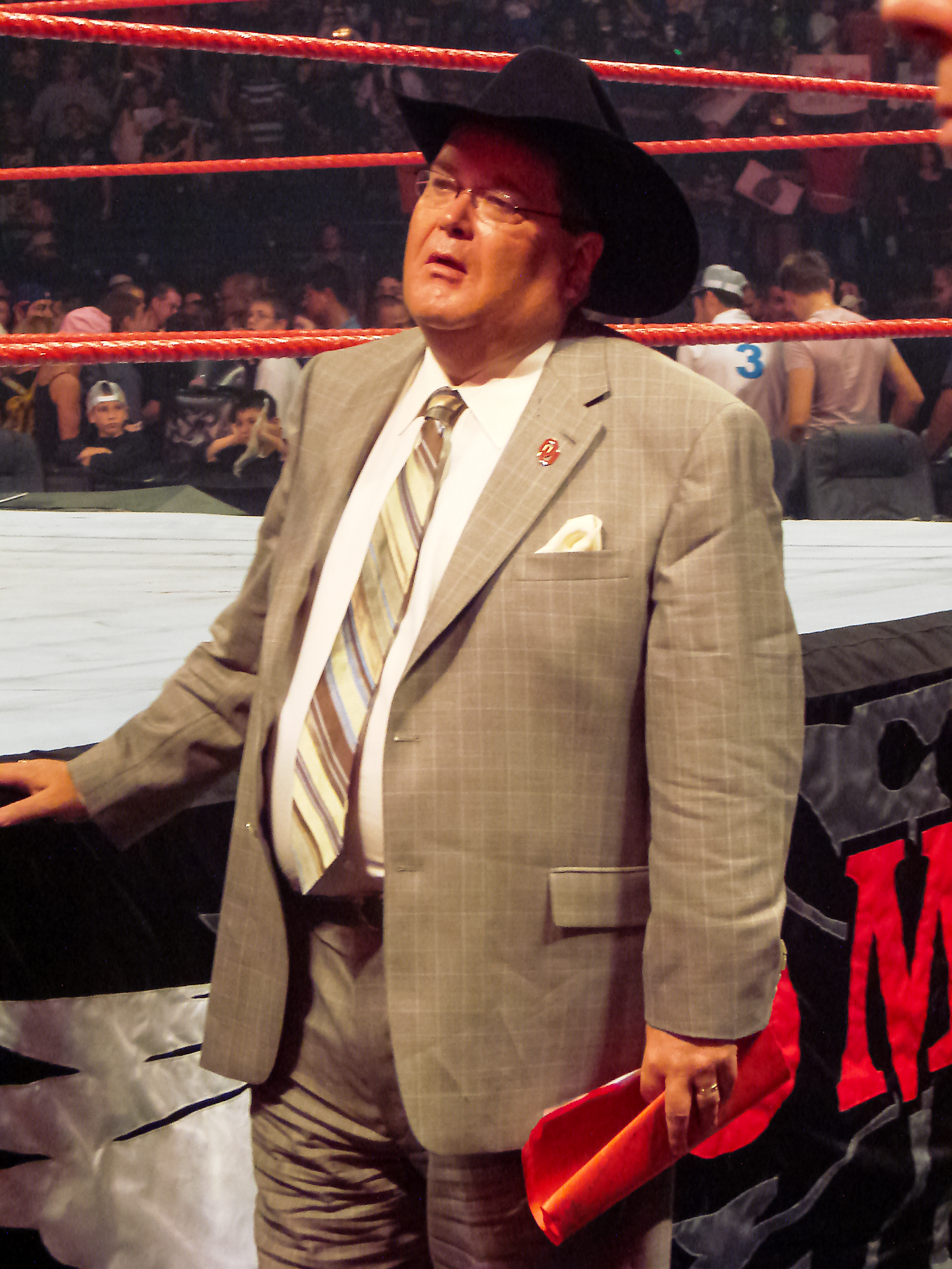
Jim Ross, namesake of this category, is a 14-time winner of the category.

Year	Announcer	Promotion(s)
1981	Gordon Solie	National Wrestling Alliance
1982	Gordon Solie	National Wrestling Alliance
1983	Gordon Solie	National Wrestling Alliance
1984	Lance Russell	Continental Wrestling Association
1985	Lance Russell	Continental Wrestling Association
1986	Lance Russell	Continental Wrestling Association
1987	Lance Russell	Continental Wrestling Association
1988	Jim Ross	World Championship Wrestling
1989	Jim Ross	World Championship Wrestling
1990	Jim Ross	World Championship Wrestling
1991	Jim Ross	World Championship Wrestling
1992	Jim Ross	World Championship Wrestling
1993	Jim Ross	World Championship Wrestling; World Wrestling Federation
1994	Joey Styles	Extreme Championship Wrestling
1995	Joey Styles	Extreme Championship Wrestling
1996	Joey Styles	Extreme Championship Wrestling
1997	Mike Tenay	World Championship Wrestling
1998	Jim Ross	World Wrestling Federation
1999	Jim Ross	World Wrestling Federation
2000	Jim Ross	World Wrestling Federation
2001	Jim Ross	World Wrestling Federation
2002	Mike Tenay	Total Nonstop Action Wrestling
2003	Mike Tenay	Total Nonstop Action Wrestling
2004	Mike Tenay	Total Nonstop Action Wrestling
2005	Mike Tenay	Total Nonstop Action Wrestling
2006	Jim Ross	World Wrestling Entertainment
2007	Jim Ross	World Wrestling Entertainment
2008	Matt Striker	World Wrestling Entertainment
2009	Jim Ross	World Wrestling Entertainment
2010	Joe Rogan	Ultimate Fighting Championship
2011	Joe Rogan	Ultimate Fighting Championship
2012	Jim Ross	WWE
2013	William Regal	WWE
2014	William Regal	WWE
2015	Mauro Ranallo	New Japan Pro-Wrestling
2016	Mauro Ranallo	New Japan Pro-Wrestling; WWE
2017	Mauro Ranallo	WWE; Bellator MMA
2018	Kevin Kelly	New Japan Pro-Wrestling
2019	Kevin Kelly	New Japan Pro-Wrestling
2020	Excalibur	All Elite Wrestling
2021	Excalibur	All Elite Wrestling
2022	Kevin Kelly	New Japan Pro-Wrestling
2023	Excalibur	All Elite Wrestling
2024	Nigel McGuinness	All Elite Wrestling; Ring of Honor
2025	Bryan Danielson	All Elite Wrestling

==== Worst Television Announcer ====
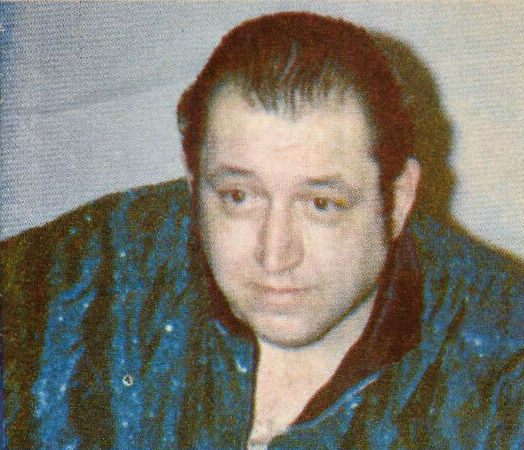
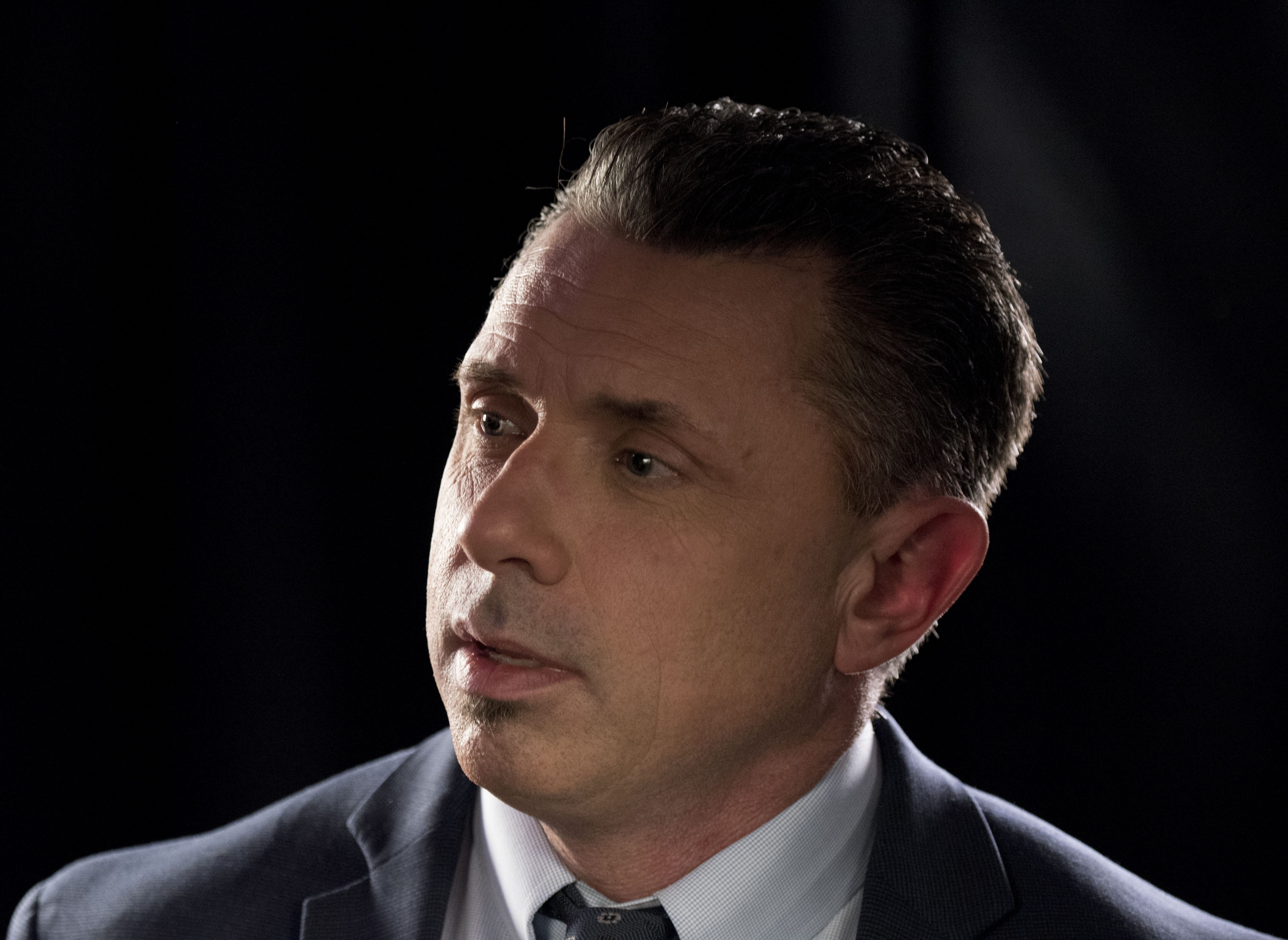
Gorilla Monsoon and Michael Cole are six-time winners of the category.

Year	Announcer	Promotion(s)
1984	Angelo Mosca	World Wrestling Federation
1985	Gorilla Monsoon	World Wrestling Federation
1986	David Crockett	Jim Crockett Promotions
1987	David Crockett	Jim Crockett Promotions
1988	David Crockett	Jim Crockett Promotions
1989	Ed Whalen	Stampede Wrestling
1990	Herb Abrams	Universal Wrestling Federation
1991	Gorilla Monsoon	World Wrestling Federation
1992	Gorilla Monsoon	World Wrestling Federation
1993	Gorilla Monsoon	World Wrestling Federation
1994	Gorilla Monsoon	World Wrestling Federation
1995	Gorilla Monsoon	World Wrestling Federation
1996	Steve McMichael	World Championship Wrestling
1997	Dusty Rhodes	World Championship Wrestling
1998	Lee Marshall	World Championship Wrestling
1999	Tony Schiavone	World Championship Wrestling
2000	Tony Schiavone	World Championship Wrestling
2001	Michael Cole	World Wrestling Federation/Entertainment
2002	Jerry Lawler	World Wrestling Federation/Entertainment
2003	Jonathan Coachman	World Wrestling Federation/Entertainment
2004	Todd Grisham	World Wrestling Federation/Entertainment
2005	Jonathan Coachman	World Wrestling Federation/Entertainment
2006	Todd Grisham	World Wrestling Federation/Entertainment
2007	Don West	Total Nonstop Action Wrestling
2008	Mike Adamle	World Wrestling Entertainment/WWE
2009	Michael Cole	World Wrestling Entertainment/WWE
2010	Michael Cole	World Wrestling Entertainment/WWE
2011	Michael Cole	World Wrestling Entertainment/WWE
2012	Michael Cole	World Wrestling Entertainment/WWE
2013	Taz	Total Nonstop Action Wrestling
2014	John "Bradshaw" Layfield	WWE
2015	John "Bradshaw" Layfield	WWE
2016	David Otunga	WWE
2017	Booker T	WWE
2018	Jonathan Coachman	WWE
2019	Corey Graves	WWE
2020	Michael Cole	WWE
2021	Corey Graves	WWE
2022	Corey Graves	WWE
2023	Booker T	WWE
2024	Booker T	WWE
2025	Booker T	WWE

==== Best Major Wrestling Show ====
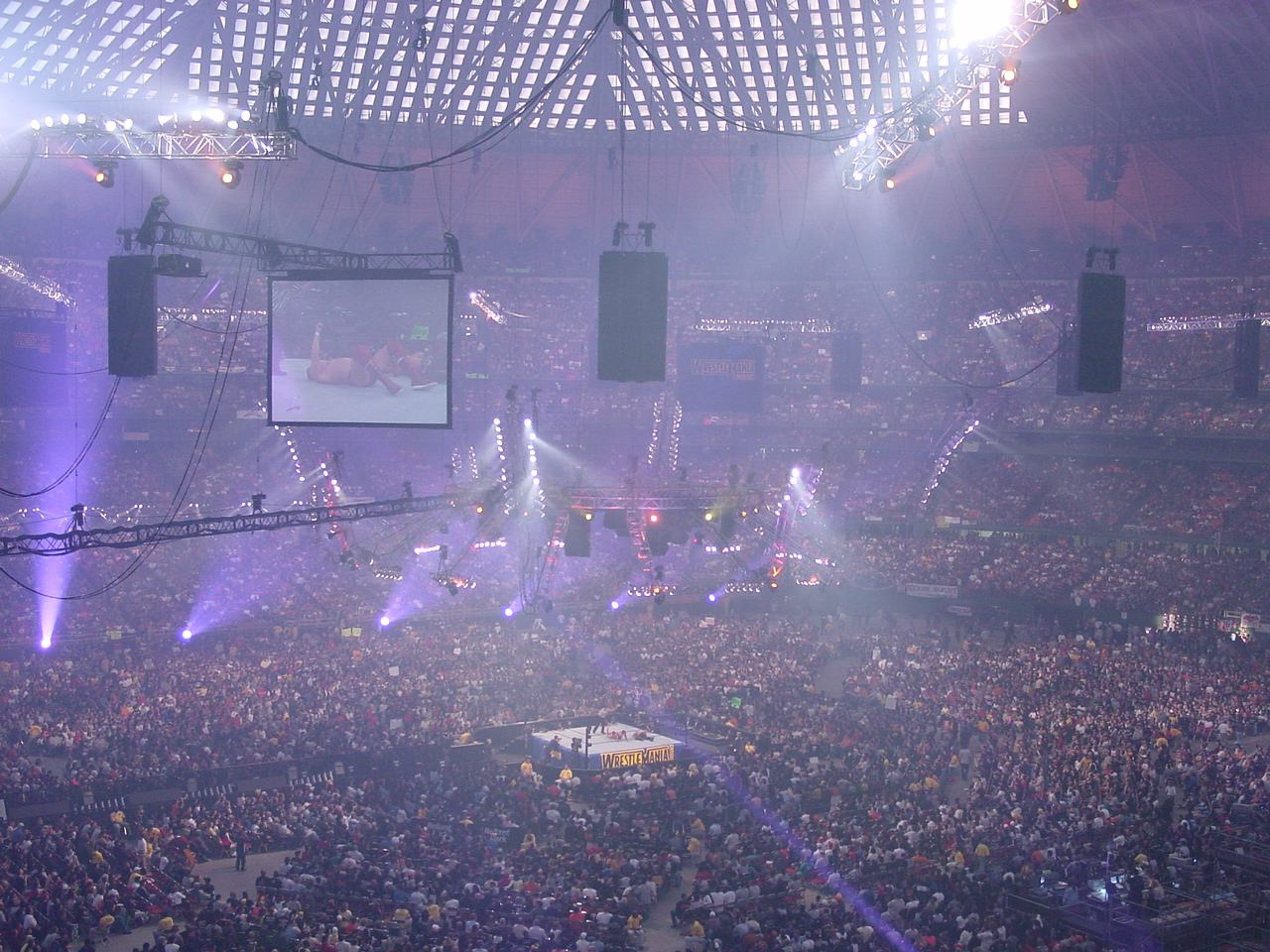
WrestleMania X-Seven, the first of two editions of WrestleMania to win this award.

Year	Show	Promotion
1989	The Great American Bash	World Championship Wrestling
1990	Wrestling Summit	World Wrestling Federation/New Japan Pro-Wrestling/All Japan Pro Wrestling
1991	WrestleWar	World Championship Wrestling
1992	Wrestlemarinpiad	All Japan Women's Pro-Wrestling
1993	Dream Slam I	All Japan Women's Pro-Wrestling
1994	Super J-Cup	New Japan Pro-Wrestling
1995	Bridge of Dreams	Weekly Pro Wrestling
1996	Super J-Cup: 2nd Stage	Wrestle Association R
1997	In Your House 16: Canadian Stampede	World Wrestling Federation
1998	Heat Wave	Extreme Championship Wrestling
1999	Anarchy Rulz	Extreme Championship Wrestling
2000	Juicio Final	Consejo Mundial de Lucha Libre
2001	WrestleMania X-Seven	World Wrestling Federation/World Wrestling Entertainment
2002	SummerSlam	World Wrestling Federation/World Wrestling Entertainment
2003	Final Conflict	Pride Fighting Championships
2004	Departure	Pro Wrestling Noah
2005	Destiny	Pro Wrestling Noah
2006	Glory By Honor V: Night 2	Ring of Honor
2007	Man Up	Ring of Honor
2008	WrestleMania XXIV	World Wrestling Entertainment
2009	Open the Historic Gate	Dragon Gate USA
2010	UFC 116	Ultimate Fighting Championship
2011	Money in the Bank	WWE
2012	King of Pro-Wrestling	New Japan Pro-Wrestling
2013	G1 Climax 23: Day 4	New Japan Pro-Wrestling
2014	G1 Climax 24: Day 7	New Japan Pro-Wrestling
2015	Wrestle Kingdom 9	New Japan Pro-Wrestling
2016	Wrestle Kingdom 10	New Japan Pro-Wrestling
2017	Wrestle Kingdom 11	New Japan Pro-Wrestling
2018	Dominion 6.9 in Osaka-jo Hall	New Japan Pro-Wrestling
2019	Double or Nothing	All Elite Wrestling
2020	Revolution	All Elite Wrestling
2021	All Out	All Elite Wrestling
2022	Forbidden Door	All Elite Wrestling; New Japan Pro-Wrestling
2023	Revolution	All Elite Wrestling
2024	Revolution	All Elite Wrestling
2025	All In	All Elite Wrestling

==== Worst Major Wrestling Show ====
Year	Show	Promotion
1989	WrestleMania V	World Wrestling Federation
1990	Clash of the Champions XII	World Championship Wrestling
1991	The Great American Bash	World Championship Wrestling
1992	Halloween Havoc	World Championship Wrestling
1993	Fall Brawl	World Championship Wrestling
1994	Blackjack Brawl	Universal Wrestling Federation
1995	Uncensored	World Championship Wrestling
1996	Uncensored	World Championship Wrestling
1997	nWo Souled Out	World Championship Wrestling
1998	Fall Brawl	World Championship Wrestling
1999	Heroes of Wrestling	Heroes of Wrestling
2000	Halloween Havoc	World Championship Wrestling
2001	Unleashed	Women of Wrestling
2002	King of the Ring	World Wrestling Entertainment
2003	Backlash	World Wrestling Entertainment
2004	The Great American Bash	World Wrestling Entertainment
2005	The Great American Bash	World Wrestling Entertainment
2006	UFC 61	Ultimate Fighting Championship
2007	December to Dismember	World Wrestling Entertainment
2008	Survivor Series	World Wrestling Entertainment
2009	Victory Road	Total Nonstop Action Wrestling
2010	Hardcore Justice	Total Nonstop Action Wrestling
2011	Victory Road	Total Nonstop Action Wrestling
2012	UFC 149	Ultimate Fighting Championship
2013	Battleground	WWE
2014	Battleground	WWE
2015	Triplemanía XXIII	Lucha Libre AAA Worldwide
2016	WrestleMania 32	WWE
2017	Battleground	WWE
2018	Crown Jewel	WWE
2019	Super Showdown	WWE
2020	Super Showdown	WWE
2021	Survivor Series	WWE
2022	Royal Rumble	WWE
2023	Crown Jewel	WWE
2024	Triplemanía XXXII: Monterrey	Lucha Libre AAA Worldwide
2025	Wrestlepalooza	WWE

==== Best Wrestling Maneuver ====
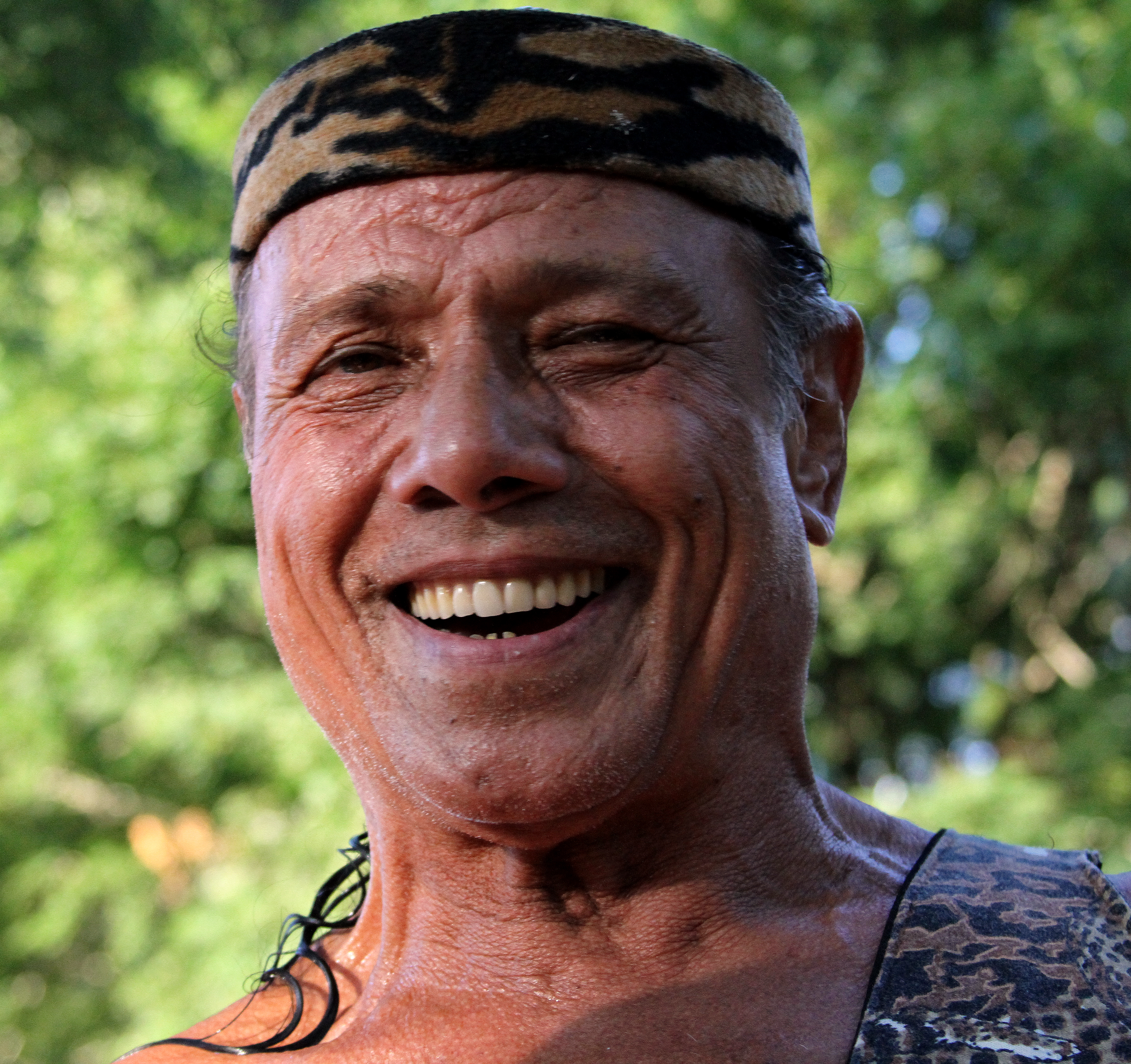
Jimmy Snuka was the first winner of the award, winning in 1981

Year	Wrestler	Maneuver	Promotion(s)
1981	Jimmy Snuka	Superfly splash Diving splash	World Wrestling Federation
1982	Super Destroyer	Superplex; Suplex from ring ropes	National Wrestling Alliance
1983	Jimmy Snuka	Superfly splash	World Wrestling Federation
1984	British Bulldogs	Military press followed by a missile dropkick	World Wrestling Federation
1985	Tiger Mask II	Topé con giro Suicide dive through the ropes into senton	All Japan Pro Wrestling
1986	Chavo Guerrero	Moonsault block	World Wrestling Association
1987	Keiichi Yamada	Shooting star press	Stampede Wrestling; New Japan Pro-Wrestling; All Star Promotions
1988	Keiichi Yamada	Shooting star press	Stampede Wrestling; New Japan Pro-Wrestling; All Star Promotions
1989	Scott Steiner	Frankensteiner; Headscissors takedown	World Championship Wrestling; New Japan Pro-Wrestling
1990	Scott Steiner	Frankensteiner; Headscissors takedown	World Championship Wrestling; New Japan Pro-Wrestling
1991	Masao Orihara	Top-rope moonsault to the outside of the ring	New Japan Pro-Wrestling
1992	2 Cold Scorpio	450° splash	World Championship Wrestling
1993	Vader	Moonsault	World Championship Wrestling
1994	The Great Sasuke	Sasuke Special; Cartwheel moonsault over the top rope	Michinoku Pro Wrestling; New Japan Pro-Wrestling
1995	Rey Misterio Jr.	Flip dive into a frankensteiner on the floor	Extreme Championship Wrestling
1996	Último Dragón	Running Liger bomb Running sitout powerbomb	World Championship Wrestling; Wrestle Association R
1997	Diamond Dallas Page	Diamond Cutter; Jumping cutter	World Championship Wrestling
1998	Kenta Kobashi	Burning Hammer; Inverted Death Valley driver	All Japan Pro Wrestling
1999	Dragon Kid	Dragonrana; Somersault into hurricanrana	Toryumon Japan
2000	Dragon Kid	Dragonrana; Somersault into hurricanrana	Toryumon Japan
2001	Keiji Muto/The Great Muta	Shining Wizard; Knee strike onto kneeling opponent	New Japan Pro-Wrestling; All Japan Pro Wrestling
2002	Brock Lesnar	F-5; Fireman's carry facebuster	World Wrestling Entertainment
2003	AJ Styles	Styles Clash; Belly-to-back inverted mat slam	Total Nonstop Action Wrestling; Ring of Honor
2004	Petey Williams	Canadian Destroyer; Flip piledriver	Total Nonstop Action Wrestling
2005	Petey Williams	Canadian Destroyer; Flip piledriver	Total Nonstop Action Wrestling
2006	Kenta	Go 2 Sleep; Fireman's carry drop into knee strike	Pro Wrestling Noah; Ring of Honor
2007	Kenta	Go 2 Sleep; Fireman's carry drop into knee strike	Pro Wrestling Noah; Ring of Honor
2008	Evan Bourne	Air Bourne; Shooting star press	World Wrestling Entertainment
2009	The Young Bucks	More Bang for Your Buck; Rolling fireman's carry slam, followed by 450° splash, followed by moonsault	Chikara; Dragon Gate USA; Pro Wrestling Guerrilla; Ring of Honor; Total Nonstop Action Wrestling
2010	Ricochet	Double rotation moonsault	Dragon Gate USA; Pro Wrestling Guerrilla
2011	Ricochet	Double rotation moonsault	Dragon Gate USA; Pro Wrestling Guerrilla
2012	Kazuchika Okada	Rainmaker; Short-arm lariat	New Japan Pro-Wrestling
2013	Kazuchika Okada	Rainmaker; Short-arm lariat	New Japan Pro-Wrestling
2014	The Young Bucks	Meltzer Driver; Springboard somersault senton spike into kneeling belly-to-belly piledriver	New Japan Pro-Wrestling; Pro Wrestling Guerrilla; Ring of Honor
2015	AJ Styles	Styles Clash	New Japan Pro-Wrestling; Ring of Honor
2016	Kenny Omega	One-Winged Angel; One-handed electric chair driver	New Japan Pro-Wrestling
2017	Kenny Omega	One-Winged Angel; One-handed electric chair driver	New Japan Pro-Wrestling
2018	Kenny Omega	One-Winged Angel; One-handed electric chair driver	New Japan Pro-Wrestling
2019	Will Ospreay	Storm Breaker; Double underhook Canadian backbreaker rack into a modified corkscrew neckbreaker	New Japan Pro-Wrestling
2020	Kenny Omega	One Winged Angel	All Elite Wrestling; Lucha Libre AAA Worldwide
2021	"Hangman" Adam Page	Buckshot Lariat; Slingshot flipping lariat	All Elite Wrestling
2022	Will Ospreay	Hidden Blade; Running elbow strike to the back of a kneeling opponent's head	New Japan Pro-Wrestling; All Elite Wrestling
2023	Will Ospreay	Hidden Blade; Running elbow strike to the back of a kneeling opponent's head	New Japan Pro-Wrestling; All Elite Wrestling
2024	Will Ospreay	Hidden Blade; Running elbow strike to the back of a kneeling opponent's head	New Japan Pro-Wrestling; All Elite Wrestling
2025	"Hangman" Adam Page	Buckshot Lariat	All Elite Wrestling

==== Most Disgusting Promotional Tactic ====
Year	Promotional Tactic	Promotion(s)
1981	Monster character (Tony Hernandez)	LeBelle Promotions
1982	Bob Backlund as WWF Champion	World Wrestling Federation
1983	Eddie Gilbert re-breaking his neck in an angle after having done so legitimately	World Wrestling Federation
1984	Blackjack Mulligan fake heart attack	Championship Wrestling from Florida
1985	Usage of Mike Von Erich's near-death to sell tickets	World Class Championship Wrestling
1986	Comparing Chris Adams' blindness angle with the death of Gino Hernandez	World Class Championship Wrestling
1987	Exploitation of the death of Mike Von Erich	World Class Championship Wrestling
1988	Fritz Von Erich's fake heart attack	World Class Championship Wrestling
1989	José González's babyface push one year after Bruiser Brody stabbing case	World Wrestling Council/Capitol Sports Promotions
1990	Atsushi Onita stabbing José González, two years after Bruiser Brody stabbing case	Frontier Martial-Arts Wrestling
1991	Exploiting the Persian Gulf War (Sgt. Slaughter Iraqi sympathizer angle)	World Wrestling Federation
1992	Pushing Erik Watts	World Championship Wrestling
1993	Cactus Jack gets amnesia	World Championship Wrestling
1994	Ric Flair retirement angle	World Championship Wrestling
1995	Gene Okerlund's 900 hotline announcement of the death of Jerry Blackwell	World Championship Wrestling
1996	Fake Diesel and Razor Ramon	World Wrestling Federation
1997	Melanie Pillman interview on Raw the day after Brian Pillman's death	World Wrestling Federation
1998	Exploiting Scott Hall's alcoholism	World Championship Wrestling
1999	Over the Edge pay-per-view continuing after the death of Owen Hart	World Wrestling Federation
2000	David Arquette wins the WCW World Heavyweight Championship	World Championship Wrestling
2001	Stephanie McMahon comparing her father's indictment to September 11 attacks	World Wrestling Federation/World Wrestling Entertainment
2002	Triple H accusing Kane of murder and necrophilia (Katie Vick)	World Wrestling Federation/World Wrestling Entertainment
2003	McMahons all over the product	World Wrestling Federation/World Wrestling Entertainment
2004	Kane and Lita pregnancy/wedding/miscarriage angle	World Wrestling Federation/World Wrestling Entertainment
2005	Not editing out a terrorist angle (Muhammad Hassan attacking The Undertaker) for air on day of London bombings	World Wrestling Federation/World Wrestling Entertainment
2006	Exploitation of the death of Eddie Guerrero	World Wrestling Federation/World Wrestling Entertainment
2007	Signing of Adam "Pacman" Jones and having him "Make It Rain" on television, when his doing so in a strip club led to the paralysis of a wrestler	Total Nonstop Action Wrestling
2008	Teasing a Jeff Hardy drug overdose to garner late interest in a PPV show	World Wrestling Entertainment/WWE
2009	Mickie James' "Piggy James" angle making fun of her weight	World Wrestling Entertainment/WWE
2010	Stand Up For WWE campaign, launched in conjunction with Linda McMahon's US Senate run	World Wrestling Entertainment/WWE
2011	Promoting an anti-bullying campaign despite blatant mistreatment of Jim Ross	World Wrestling Entertainment/WWE
2012	CM Punk and Paul Heyman exploiting Jerry Lawler's real-life heart attack, playing footage of him near death	World Wrestling Entertainment/WWE
2013	Exploitation of the death of Bill Moody	World Wrestling Entertainment/WWE
2014	Insulting fans who purchased PPVs	World Wrestling Entertainment/WWE
2015	Using Reid Fliehr's death in an angle	World Wrestling Entertainment/WWE
2016	Kimbo Slice vs. Dada 5000 fight	Bellator MMA
2017	Promoting Jimmy Snuka as a hero in death not long after his trial over the death of Nancy Argentino	WWE
2018	Relationship with Saudi Arabia	WWE
2019	Relationship with Saudi Arabia	WWE
2020	Firing people during a global pandemic while setting profit records	WWE
2021	Firing people during a global pandemic while setting profit records	WWE
2022	Vince McMahon appearing on television for a crowd pop after sexual misconduct allegations came out	WWE
2023	WWE enabling Vince McMahon and him being back in power, and TKO keeping him in a position of power	WWE
2024	Continued relationship with Saudi Arabia	WWE
2025	WWE bringing back Brock Lesnar	WWE

==== Worst Television Show ====
Year	Program	Promotion
1984	All-Star Wrestling	World Wrestling Federation
1985	Championship Wrestling from Florida	Championship Wrestling from Florida
1986	California Championship Wrestling	California Championship Wrestling
1987	World Class Championship Wrestling	World Class Championship Wrestling
1988	Championship Wrestling	American Wrestling Association
1989	ICW Wrestling	International Championship Wrestling
1990	Championship Wrestling	American Wrestling Association
1991	Fury Hour	Universal Wrestling Federation
1992	Global Wrestling Federation on ESPN	Global Wrestling Federation
1993	Global Wrestling Federation on ESPN	Global Wrestling Federation
1994	Saturday Night	World Championship Wrestling
1995	Saturday Night	World Championship Wrestling
1996	Warriors of Wrestling	American Wrestling Federation
1997	United States Wrestling Association	United States Wrestling Association
1998	Monday Nitro	World Championship Wrestling
1999	Thunder	World Championship Wrestling
2000	Thunder	World Championship Wrestling
2001	Excess	World Wrestling Federation/Entertainment
2002	Monday Night Raw	World Wrestling Federation/Entertainment
2003	Monday Night Raw	World Wrestling Federation/Entertainment
2004	Friday Night SmackDown!	World Wrestling Federation/Entertainment
2005	Friday Night SmackDown!	World Wrestling Federation/Entertainment
2006	Monday Night Raw	World Wrestling Federation/Entertainment
2007	Impact!/Impact Wrestling	Total Nonstop Action Wrestling
2008	Impact!/Impact Wrestling	Total Nonstop Action Wrestling
2009	Impact!/Impact Wrestling	Total Nonstop Action Wrestling
2010	Impact!/Impact Wrestling	Total Nonstop Action Wrestling
2011	Impact!/Impact Wrestling	Total Nonstop Action Wrestling
2012	Monday Night Raw	WWE
2013	Impact Wrestling	Total Nonstop Action Wrestling
2014	Monday Night Raw	WWE
2015	Monday Night Raw	WWE
2016	Monday Night Raw	WWE
2017	Monday Night Raw	WWE
2018	Monday Night Raw	WWE
2019	Monday Night Raw	WWE
2020	Monday Night Raw	WWE
2021	Monday Night Raw	WWE
2022	Monday Night Raw	WWE
2023	NWA Powerrr	National Wrestling Alliance
2024	Rampage	All Elite Wrestling
2025	NXT	WWE

==== Worst Match of the Year ====
Note: Named "Worst Worked Match of the Year" until 2018.

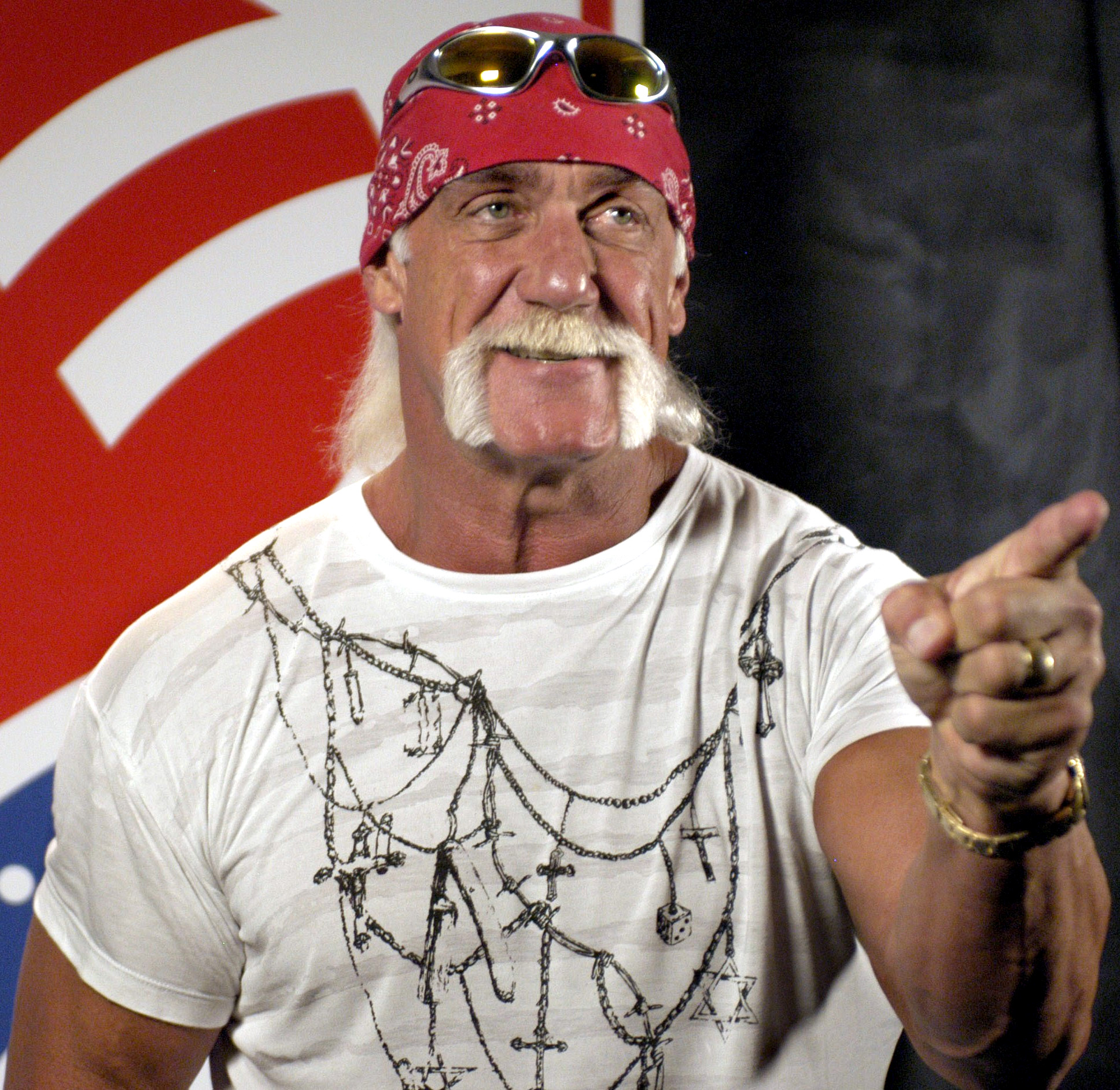
Hulk Hogan won the award for a record three straight years.

Year	Match	Promotion	Show and venue
1984	Wendi Richter vs. The Fabulous Moolah	World Wrestling Federation	The Brawl to End It All; New York, New York; July 23
1985	Freddie Blassie vs. Lou Albano; Steel Cage match	World Wrestling Federation	WWF House Show; Uniondale, New York; September 20
1986	Mr. T vs. Roddy Piper; Boxing match	World Wrestling Federation	WrestleMania 2 Uniondale, New York; April 7
1987	Hulk Hogan vs. André the Giant	World Wrestling Federation	WrestleMania III; Pontiac, Michigan; March 29
1988	Hiroshi Wajima vs. Tom Magee	All Japan Pro Wrestling	Champion Carnival; Kawasaki, Japan; April 21
1989	André the Giant vs. Ultimate Warrior	World Wrestling Federation	Saturday Night's Main Event XXIV; Topeka, Kansas; October 31
1990	Sid Vicious vs. The Nightstalker	World Championship Wrestling	Clash of the Champions XIII; Jacksonville, Florida; November 20
1991	Bobby Eaton and P. N. News vs. Terrance Taylor and Steve Austin; Capture the Flag scaffold match	World Championship Wrestling	The Great American Bash; Baltimore, Maryland; July 14
1992	Rick Rude vs. Masahiro Chono	World Championship Wrestling	Halloween Havoc; Philadelphia, Pennsylvania; October 25
1993	The Bushwhackers and Men on a Mission vs. Bam Bam Bigelow, Bastion Booger, and The Headshrinkers	World Wrestling Federation	Survivor Series; Boston, Massachusetts; November 24
1994	The Royal Court vs. Clowns R' Us	World Wrestling Federation	Survivor Series; San Antonio, Texas; November 23
1995	Sting vs. Tony Palmore	New Japan Pro-Wrestling	Battle 7 Tokyo, Japan; January 4
1996	Hulk Hogan and Randy Savage vs. Ric Flair, Arn Anderson, Meng, The Barbarian, Lex Luger, Kevin Sullivan, Z-Gangsta and The Ultimate Solution; Doomsday Cage match	World Championship Wrestling	Uncensored; Tupelo, Mississippi; March 24
1997	Hollywood Hogan vs. "Rowdy" Roddy Piper	World Championship Wrestling	SuperBrawl; Daly City, California; February 23
1998	Hollywood Hogan vs. The Warrior	World Championship Wrestling	Halloween Havoc; Las Vegas, Nevada; October 25
1999	Al Snow vs. Big Boss Man; Kennel from Hell match	World Wrestling Federation/Entertainment	Unforgiven; Charlotte, North Carolina; September 26
2000	Pat Patterson vs. Gerald Brisco; Hardcore Evening Gown match	World Wrestling Federation/Entertainment	King of the Ring; Boston, Massachusetts; June 25
2001	The Brothers of Destruction vs. KroniK	World Wrestling Federation/Entertainment	Unforgiven; Pittsburgh, Pennsylvania; September 23
2002	Bradshaw and Trish Stratus vs. Christopher Nowinski and Jackie Gayda	World Wrestling Federation/Entertainment	Monday Night Raw; Philadelphia, Pennsylvania; July 8
2003	Triple H vs. Scott Steiner	World Wrestling Federation/Entertainment	Royal Rumble; Boston, Massachusetts; January 19
2004	Tyson Tomko vs. Stevie Richards	World Wrestling Federation/Entertainment	Unforgiven; Portland, Oregon; September 12
2005	Eric Bischoff vs. Theodore Long	World Wrestling Federation/Entertainment	Survivor Series; Detroit, Michigan; November 27
2006	Reverse Battle Royal	Total Nonstop Action Wrestling	Impact! Orlando, Florida; October 26
2007	James Storm vs. Chris Harris; Six Sides of Steel blindfold match	Total Nonstop Action Wrestling	Lockdown; St. Louis, Missouri; April 15
2008	Edge vs. Triple H vs. Vladimir Kozlov	World Wrestling Entertainment	Survivor Series; Boston, Massachusetts; November 23
2009	Jenna Morasca vs. Sharmell	Total Nonstop Action Wrestling	Victory Road; Orlando, Florida; July 19
2010	Kaitlyn vs. Maxine	World Wrestling Entertainment	NXT; Edmonton, Alberta, Canada; October 19
2011	Sting vs. Jeff Hardy	Total Nonstop Action Wrestling	Victory Road; Orlando, Florida; March 13
2012	John Cena vs. John Laurinaitis; No Disqualification match	WWE	Over the Limit; Raleigh, North Carolina; May 20
2013	Brie Bella, Nikki Bella, Natalya, Naomi, Cameron, Eva Marie, and JoJo vs. AJ Lee, Tamina Snuka, Kaitlyn, Alicia Fox, Aksana, Rosa Mendes, and Summer Rae; Survivor Series match	WWE	Survivor Series; Boston, Massachusetts; November 24
2014	John Cena vs. Bray Wyatt; Steel Cage match	WWE	Extreme Rules; East Rutherford, New Jersey; May 4
2015	Los Psycho Circus (Monster Clown, Murder Clown and Psycho Clown) vs. Los Villanos (Villano III, Villano IV and Villano V)	Lucha Libre AAA Worldwide	Triplemanía XXIII; Mexico City, Mexico; August 9
2016	Shelly Martinez vs. Rebel	Total Nonstop Action Wrestling	One Night Only: Knockouts Knockdown; Orlando, Florida; March 17
2017	Bray Wyatt vs. Randy Orton	WWE	WrestleMania 33; Orlando, Florida; April 2
2018	D-Generation X vs. Brothers of Destruction	WWE	Crown Jewel; Riyadh, Saudi Arabia; November 2
2019	Seth Rollins vs. "The Fiend" Bray Wyatt; Hell in a Cell match	WWE	Hell in a Cell; Sacramento, California; October 6
2020	Braun Strowman vs. "The Fiend" Bray Wyatt; Wyatt Swamp Fight	WWE	The Horror Show at Extreme Rules; Orlando, Florida; July 19
2021	The Miz vs. Damian Priest; Zombie lumberjack match	WWE	WrestleMania Backlash; Tampa, Florida; May 16
2022	Pat McAfee vs. Mr. McMahon	WWE	Wrestlemania 38 Night 2 Arlington, Texas; April 3
2023	Bray Wyatt vs. LA Knight; Mountain Dew Pitch Black match	WWE	Royal Rumble; San Antonio, Texas; January 28
2024	Jey Uso vs. Jimmy Uso	WWE	WrestleMania XL Night 1 Philadelphia, Pennsylvania; April 6
2025	John Cena vs. Cody Rhodes	WWE	WrestleMania 41 Night 2 Las Vegas, Nevada; April 20

==== Worst Feud of the Year ====
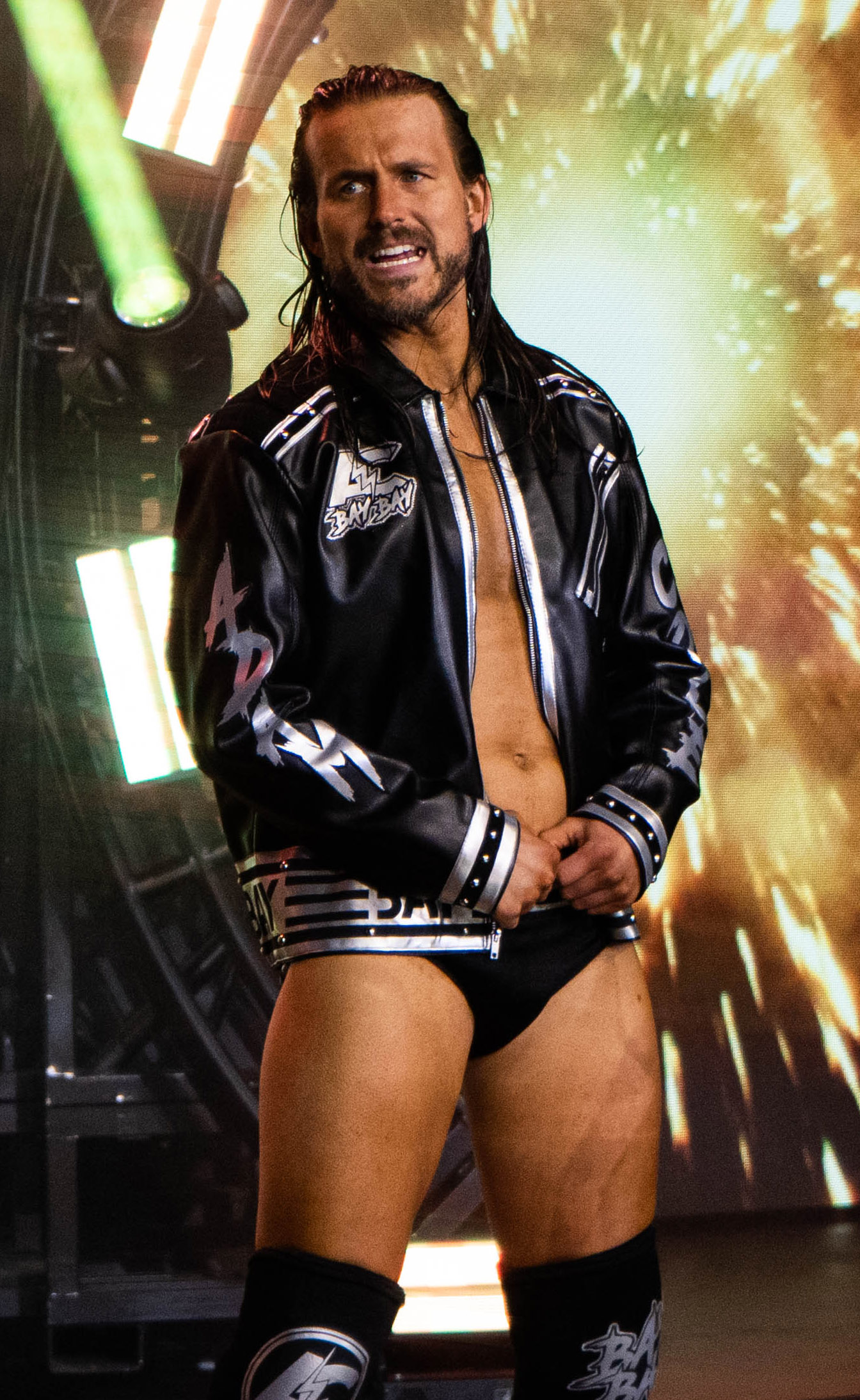
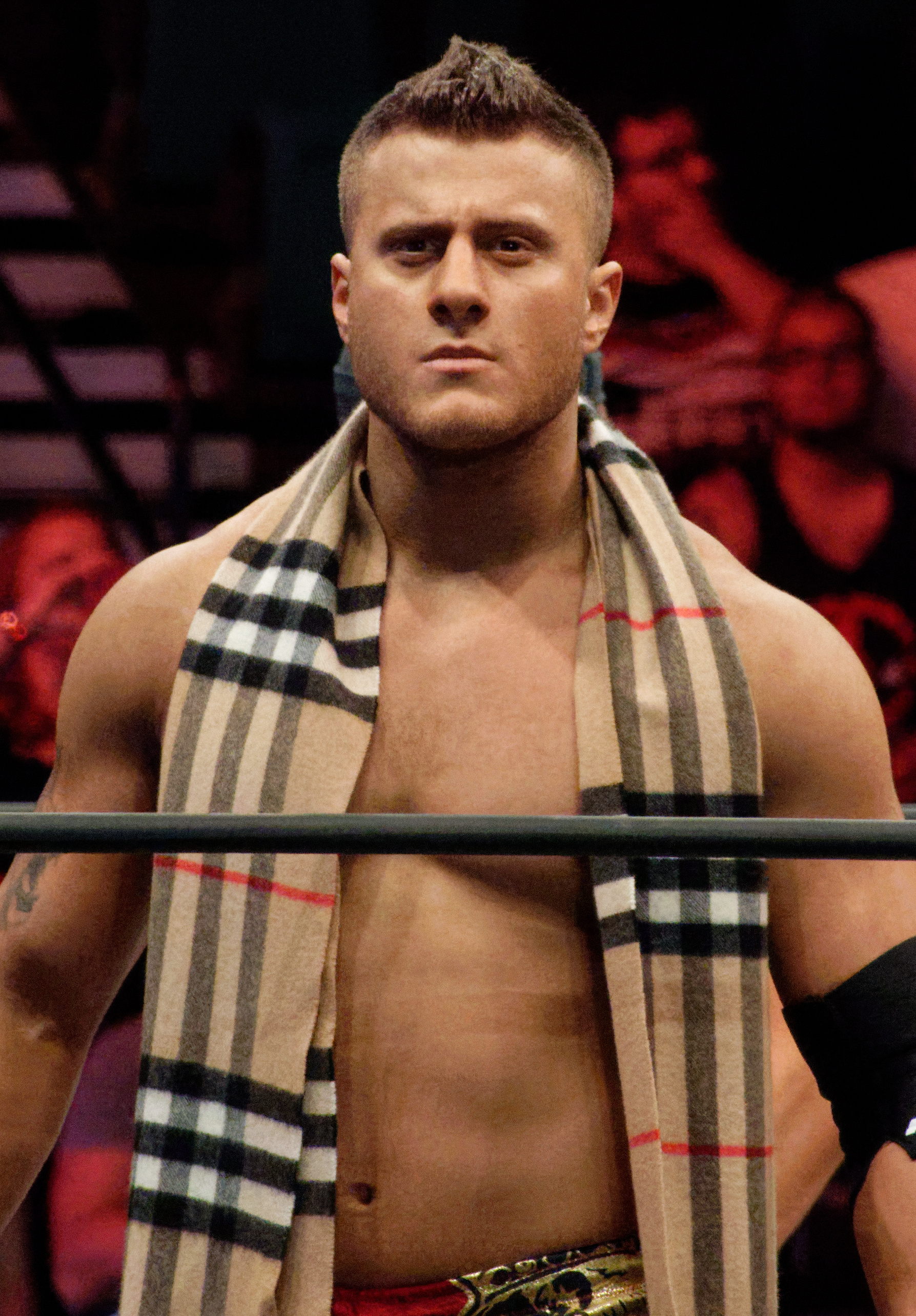
Adam Cole/The Devil vs. MJF won the award twice.

Year	Feud	Promotion
1984	André the Giant vs. Big John Studd	World Wrestling Federation
1985	Sgt. Slaughter vs. Boris Zhukov	American Wrestling Association
1986	The Machines vs. King Kong Bundy and John Studd	World Wrestling Federation
1987	George Steele vs. Danny Davis	World Wrestling Federation
1988	The Midnight Rider vs. Tully Blanchard	Jim Crockett Promotions
1989	André the Giant vs. Ultimate Warrior	World Wrestling Federation
1990	Ric Flair vs. The Junkyard Dog	World Championship Wrestling
1991	Hulk Hogan vs. Sgt. Slaughter	World Wrestling Federation
1992	Ultimate Warrior vs. Papa Shango	World Wrestling Federation
1993	The Undertaker vs. Giant González	World Wrestling Federation
1994	Jerry Lawler vs. Doink the Clown	World Wrestling Federation
1995	Hulk Hogan vs. The Dungeon of Doom	World Championship Wrestling
1996	Big Bubba vs. John Tenta	World Championship Wrestling
1997	The D.O.A. vs. Los Boricuas	World Wrestling Federation
1998	Hollywood Hogan vs. The Warrior	World Championship Wrestling
1999	Big Boss Man vs. Big Show	World Wrestling Federation
2000	Hulk Hogan vs. Billy Kidman	World Championship Wrestling
2001	WWF vs. The Alliance; The Invasion storyline	World Wrestling Federation/Entertainment/WWE
2002	Triple H vs. Kane	World Wrestling Federation/Entertainment/WWE
2003	Kane vs. Shane McMahon	World Wrestling Federation/Entertainment/WWE
2004	Kane vs. Matt Hardy and Lita	World Wrestling Federation/Entertainment/WWE
2005	McMahon Family vs. Jim Ross	World Wrestling Federation/Entertainment/WWE
2006	McMahon Family vs. D-Generation X	World Wrestling Federation/Entertainment/WWE
2007	Kane vs. Big Daddy V	World Wrestling Federation/Entertainment/WWE
2008	Kane vs. Rey Mysterio	World Wrestling Federation/Entertainment/WWE
2009	Hornswoggle vs. Chavo Guerrero	World Wrestling Federation/Entertainment/WWE
2010	Edge vs. Kane	World Wrestling Federation/Entertainment/WWE
2011	Triple H vs. Kevin Nash	World Wrestling Federation/Entertainment/WWE
2012	John Cena vs. Kane	World Wrestling Federation/Entertainment/WWE
2013	Big Show vs. The Authority	World Wrestling Federation/Entertainment/WWE
2014	Brie Bella vs. Nikki Bella	World Wrestling Federation/Entertainment/WWE
2015	Team PCB vs. Team B.A.D. vs. Team Bella	World Wrestling Federation/Entertainment/WWE
2016	Titus O'Neil vs. Darren Young	World Wrestling Federation/Entertainment/WWE
2017	Bray Wyatt vs. Randy Orton	World Wrestling Federation/Entertainment/WWE
2018	Sasha Banks vs. Bayley	World Wrestling Federation/Entertainment/WWE
2019	Seth Rollins vs. "The Fiend" Bray Wyatt	World Wrestling Federation/Entertainment/WWE
2020	Braun Strowman vs. "The Fiend" Bray Wyatt	World Wrestling Federation/Entertainment/WWE
2021	Randy Orton vs. The Fiend & Alexa Bliss	World Wrestling Federation/Entertainment/WWE
2022	The Miz vs. Dexter Lumis	World Wrestling Federation/Entertainment/WWE
2023	MJF vs. The Devil/Adam Cole	All Elite Wrestling
2024	MJF vs. The Devil/Adam Cole	All Elite Wrestling
2025	Anthony Bowens vs. Max Caster	All Elite Wrestling

==== Worst Promotion of the Year ====
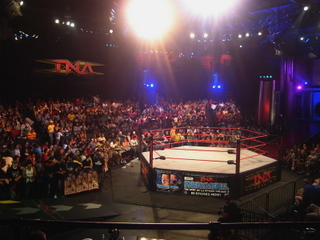
Impact Wrestling, formerly and currently known as Total Nonstop Action Wrestling, is an 11-time winner of the category, having won every year from 2007 to 2017.

Year	Promotion
1986	American Wrestling Association
1987	World Class Championship Wrestling
1988	American Wrestling Association
1989	American Wrestling Association
1990	American Wrestling Association
1991	Universal Wrestling Federation
1992	Global Wrestling Federation
1993	World Championship Wrestling
1994	World Championship Wrestling
1995	World Championship Wrestling
1996	American Wrestling Federation
1997	United States Wrestling Association
1998	World Championship Wrestling
1999	World Championship Wrestling
2000	World Championship Wrestling
2001	World Championship Wrestling
2002	Xtreme Pro Wrestling
2003	Fighting World of Japan Pro Wrestling
2004	New Japan Pro-Wrestling
2005	New Japan Pro-Wrestling
2006	World Wrestling Entertainment
2007	Total Nonstop Action Wrestling/Impact Wrestling
2008	Total Nonstop Action Wrestling/Impact Wrestling
2009	Total Nonstop Action Wrestling/Impact Wrestling
2010	Total Nonstop Action Wrestling/Impact Wrestling
2011	Total Nonstop Action Wrestling/Impact Wrestling
2012	Total Nonstop Action Wrestling/Impact Wrestling
2013	Total Nonstop Action Wrestling/Impact Wrestling
2014	Total Nonstop Action Wrestling/Impact Wrestling
2015	Total Nonstop Action Wrestling/Impact Wrestling
2016	Total Nonstop Action Wrestling/Impact Wrestling
2017	Total Nonstop Action Wrestling/Impact Wrestling
2018	WWE
2019	WWE
2020	WWE
2021	WWE
2022	WWE
2023	National Wrestling Alliance
2024	National Wrestling Alliance
2025	WWE

==== Best Booker ====
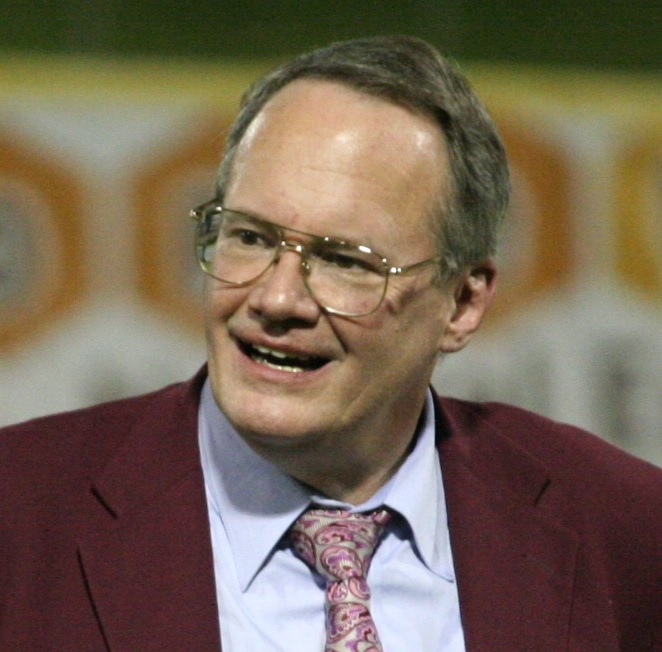
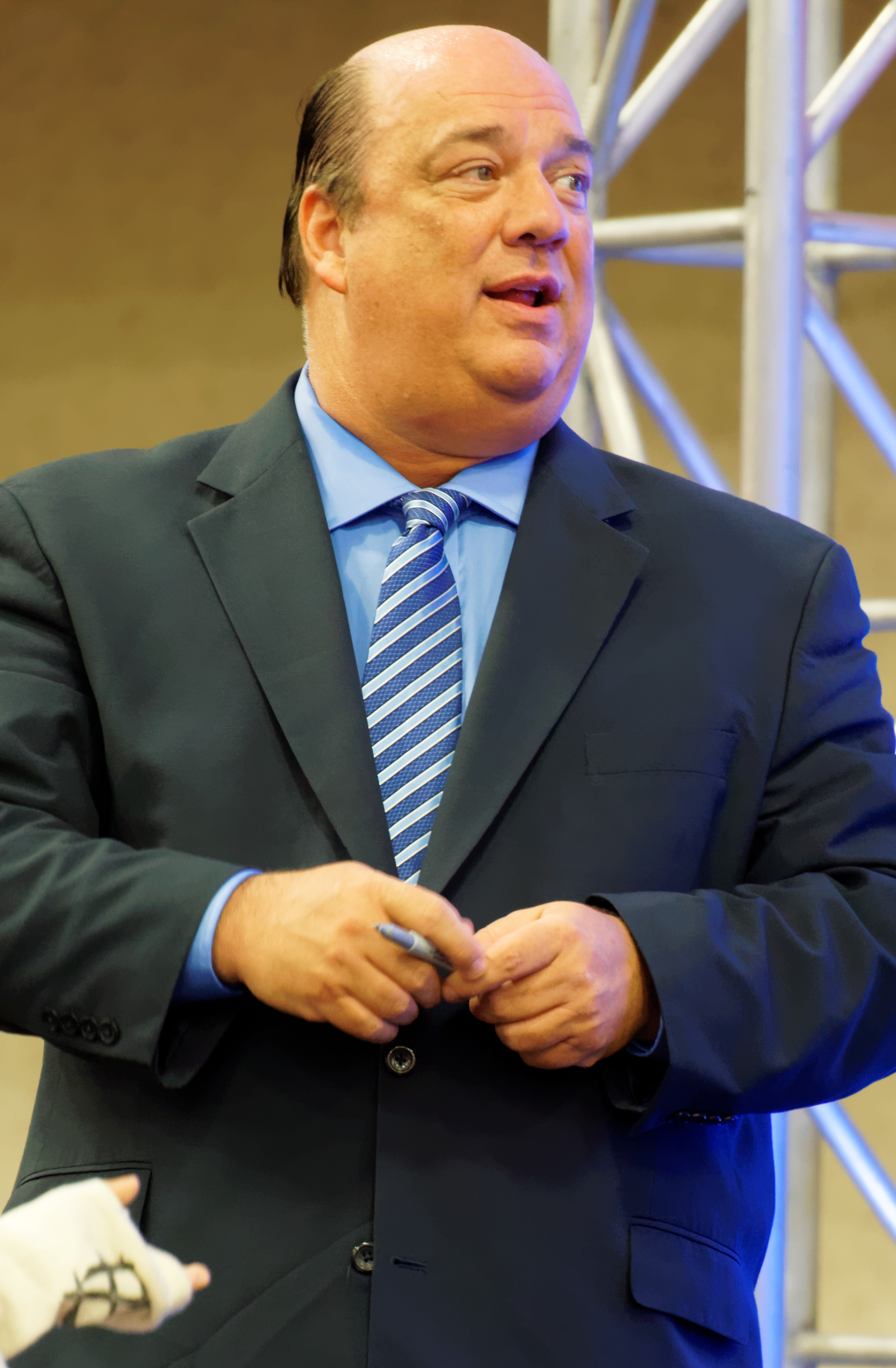
Jim Cornette (top) and Paul Heyman (bottom) are the only winners of the category who won the award for work in two separate promotions.

Year	Booker	Promotion(s)
1986	Dusty Rhodes	Jim Crockett Promotions
1987	Vince McMahon	World Wrestling Federation
1988	Eddie Gilbert	Continental Wrestling Federation
1989	Shohei Baba	All Japan Pro Wrestling
1990	Shohei Baba	All Japan Pro Wrestling
1991	Shohei Baba	All Japan Pro Wrestling
1992	Riki Choshu	New Japan Pro-Wrestling
1993	Jim Cornette	Smoky Mountain Wrestling
1994	Paul Heyman	Extreme Championship Wrestling
1995	Paul Heyman	Extreme Championship Wrestling
1996	Paul Heyman	Extreme Championship Wrestling
1997	Paul Heyman	Extreme Championship Wrestling
1998	Vince McMahon	World Wrestling Federation
1999	Vince McMahon	World Wrestling Federation
2000	Vince McMahon	World Wrestling Federation
2001	Jim Cornette	Ohio Valley Wrestling
2002	Paul Heyman	World Wrestling Entertainment
2003	Jim Cornette	Ohio Valley Wrestling
2004	Gabe Sapolsky	Ring of Honor; Full Impact Pro
2005	Gabe Sapolsky	Ring of Honor; Full Impact Pro
2006	Gabe Sapolsky	Ring of Honor; Full Impact Pro
2007	Gabe Sapolsky	Ring of Honor; Full Impact Pro
2008	Joe Silva	Ultimate Fighting Championship
2009	Joe Silva	Ultimate Fighting Championship
2010	Joe Silva	Ultimate Fighting Championship
2011	Gedo and Jado	New Japan Pro-Wrestling
2012	Gedo and Jado	New Japan Pro-Wrestling
2013	Gedo and Jado	New Japan Pro-Wrestling
2014	Gedo and Jado	New Japan Pro-Wrestling
2015	Paul Levesque and Ryan Ward	WWE (NXT)
2016	Gedo	New Japan Pro-Wrestling
2017	Gedo	New Japan Pro-Wrestling
2018	Gedo	New Japan Pro-Wrestling
2019	Gedo	New Japan Pro-Wrestling
2020	Tony Khan	All Elite Wrestling
2021	Tony Khan	All Elite Wrestling
2022	Tony Khan	All Elite Wrestling
2023	Paul Levesque	WWE
2024	Paul Levesque	WWE
2025	Tony Khan	All Elite Wrestling

==== Promoter of the Year ====
Year	Promoter	Promotion(s)
1988	Vince McMahon	World Wrestling Federation
1989	Akira Maeda	Universal Wrestling Federation
1990	Shohei Baba	All Japan Pro Wrestling
1991	Shohei Baba	All Japan Pro Wrestling
1992	Shohei Baba	All Japan Pro Wrestling
1993	Shohei Baba	All Japan Pro Wrestling
1994	Shohei Baba	All Japan Pro Wrestling
1995	Riki Choshu	New Japan Pro-Wrestling
1996	Riki Choshu	New Japan Pro-Wrestling
1997	Riki Choshu	New Japan Pro-Wrestling
1998	Vince McMahon	World Wrestling Federation
1999	Vince McMahon	World Wrestling Federation
2000	Vince McMahon	World Wrestling Federation
2001	Antonio Inoki	New Japan Pro-Wrestling
2002	Kazuyoshi Ishii	K-1
2003	Nobuyuki Sakakibara	Pride Fighting Championships
2004	Nobuyuki Sakakibara	Pride Fighting Championships
2005	Dana White	Ultimate Fighting Championship
2006	Dana White	Ultimate Fighting Championship
2007	Dana White	Ultimate Fighting Championship
2008	Dana White	Ultimate Fighting Championship
2009	Dana White	Ultimate Fighting Championship
2010	Dana White	Ultimate Fighting Championship
2011	Dana White	Ultimate Fighting Championship
2012	Dana White	Ultimate Fighting Championship
2013	Dana White	Ultimate Fighting Championship
2014	Takaaki Kidani	New Japan Pro-Wrestling
2015	Dana White	Ultimate Fighting Championship
2016	Dana White	Ultimate Fighting Championship
2017	Takaaki Kidani	New Japan Pro-Wrestling
2018	Takaaki Kidani	New Japan Pro-Wrestling
2019	Tony Khan	All Elite Wrestling
2020	Tony Khan	All Elite Wrestling
2021	Tony Khan	All Elite Wrestling
2022	Tony Khan	All Elite Wrestling
2023	Nick Khan	WWE
2024	Nick Khan	WWE
2025	Salvador Lutteroth III	Consejo Mundial de Lucha Libre

==== Best Gimmick ====
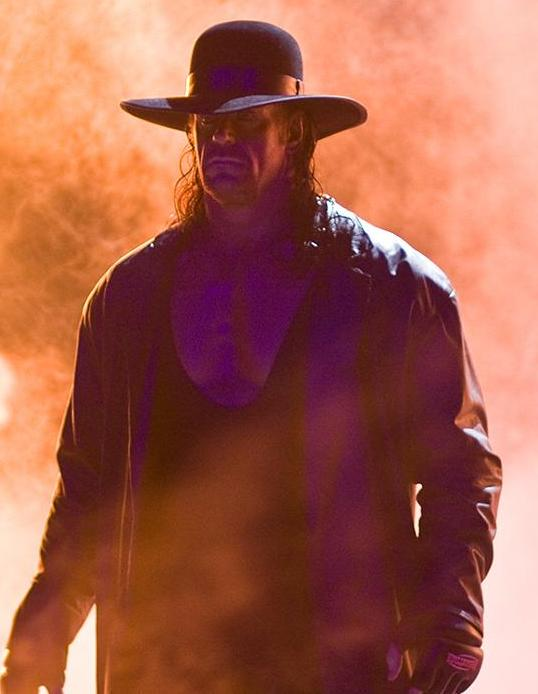
The Undertaker is a five-time winner of the category.

Year	Wrestler	Promotion(s)
1986	Adrian Street	Continental Championship Wrestling
1987	Ted DiBiase	World Wrestling Federation
1988	Rick Steiner	Jim Crockett Promotions
1989	Jushin Liger	New Japan Pro-Wrestling
1990	The Undertaker	World Wrestling Federation
1991	The Undertaker	World Wrestling Federation
1992	The Undertaker	World Wrestling Federation
1993	The Undertaker	World Wrestling Federation
1994	The Undertaker	World Wrestling Federation
1995	Disco Inferno	World Championship Wrestling
1996	nWo	World Championship Wrestling
1997	Stone Cold Steve Austin	World Wrestling Federation/World Wrestling Entertainment
1998	Stone Cold Steve Austin	World Wrestling Federation/World Wrestling Entertainment
1999	The Rock	World Wrestling Federation/World Wrestling Entertainment
2000	Kurt Angle	World Wrestling Federation/World Wrestling Entertainment
2001	The Hurricane	World Wrestling Federation/World Wrestling Entertainment
2002	Matt Hardy	World Wrestling Federation/World Wrestling Entertainment
2003	John Cena	World Wrestling Federation/World Wrestling Entertainment
2004	John "Bradshaw" Layfield	World Wrestling Federation/World Wrestling Entertainment
2005	Mr. Kennedy	World Wrestling Federation/World Wrestling Entertainment
2006	The Latin American Xchange	Total Nonstop Action Wrestling
2007	Santino Marella	World Wrestling Entertainment/WWE
2008	Santino Marella	World Wrestling Entertainment/WWE
2009	CM Punk	World Wrestling Entertainment/WWE
2010	Alberto Del Rio	World Wrestling Entertainment/WWE
2011	CM Punk	World Wrestling Entertainment/WWE
2012	Joseph Park	Total Nonstop Action Wrestling
2013	The Wyatt Family	WWE
2014	Rusev and Lana	WWE
2015	The New Day	WWE
2016	"Broken" Matt Hardy	Total Nonstop Action Wrestling
2017	Los Ingobernables de Japón	New Japan Pro-Wrestling
2018	Velveteen Dream	WWE
2019	"The Fiend" Bray Wyatt	WWE
2020	Orange Cassidy	All Elite Wrestling
2021	Roman Reigns	WWE
2022	Sami Zayn	WWE
2023	"Timeless" Toni Storm	All Elite Wrestling
2024	"Timeless" Toni Storm	All Elite Wrestling
2025	"Timeless" Toni Storm	All Elite Wrestling

==== Worst Gimmick ====
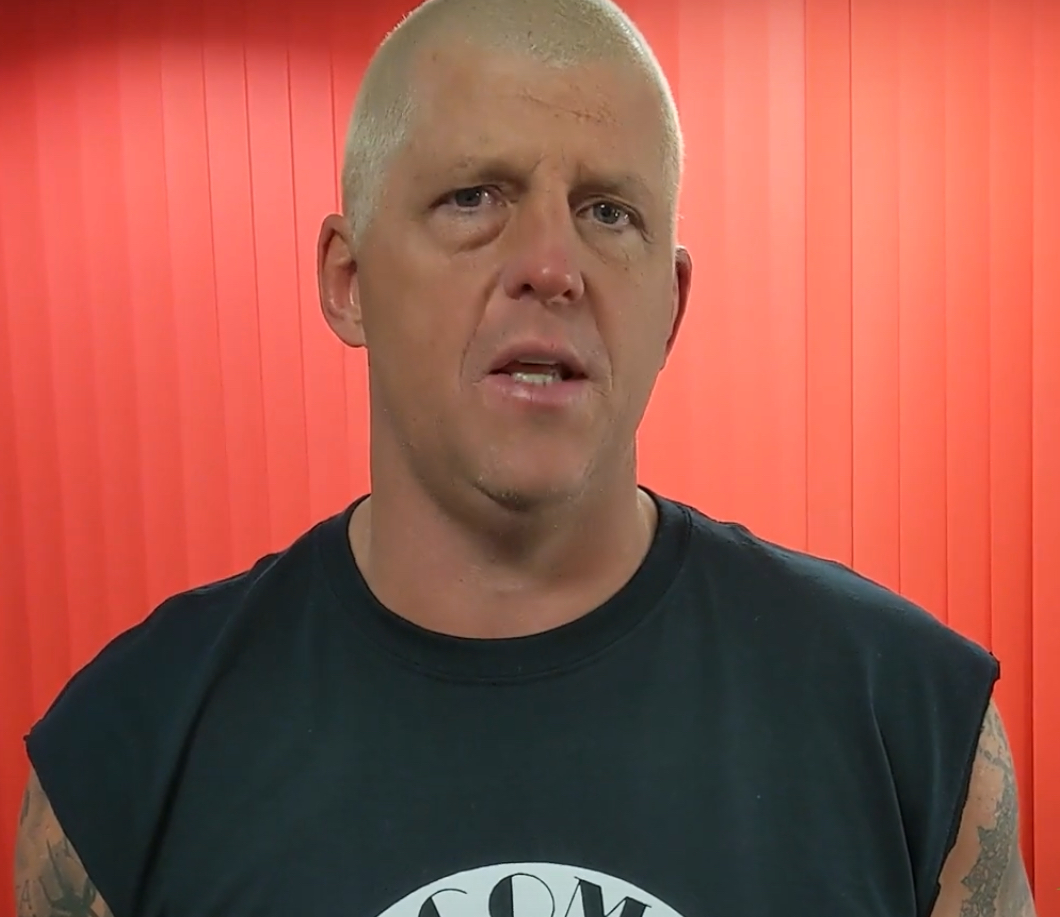
Dustin Runnels is a three-time winner of the category under three different gimmicks (Goldust, The Artist Formerly Known As Goldust and Black Reign).

Year	Wrestler	Promotion(s)
1986	Adrian Adonis	World Wrestling Federation
1987	Adrian Adonis	World Wrestling Federation
1988	Midnight Rider	Jim Crockett Promotions
1989	The Ding Dongs	World Championship Wrestling
1990	The Gobbledy Gooker	World Wrestling Federation
1991	Oz	World Championship Wrestling
1992	Papa Shango	World Wrestling Federation
1993	The Shockmaster	World Championship Wrestling
1994	Dave Sullivan	World Championship Wrestling
1995	Goldust	World Wrestling Federation
1996	Fake Diesel; Fake Razor Ramon; The Real Double J	World Wrestling Federation
1997	The Artist Formerly Known As Goldust	World Wrestling Federation
1998	The Oddities	World Wrestling Federation
1999	The Powers That Be	World Championship Wrestling
2000	Mike Awesome	World Championship Wrestling
2001	Diamond Dallas Page	World Wrestling Federation
2002	The Johnsons	NWA: Total Nonstop Action
2003	Rico Constantino	World Wrestling Entertainment
2004	Mordecai	World Wrestling Entertainment
2005	Jillian Hall	World Wrestling Entertainment
2006	Vito	World Wrestling Entertainment
2007	Black Reign	Total Nonstop Action Wrestling
2008	The Great Khali	World Wrestling Entertainment
2009	Hornswoggle	World Wrestling Entertainment
2010	Orlando Jordan	Total Nonstop Action Wrestling
2011	Michael Cole	WWE
2012	Aces & Eights	Total Nonstop Action Wrestling
2013	Aces & Eights	Total Nonstop Action Wrestling
2014	Adam Rose	WWE
2015	Stardust	WWE
2016	Bone Soldier	New Japan Pro-Wrestling
2017	Bray Wyatt/Sister Abigail	WWE
2018	Constable Corbin	WWE
2019	Shorty G	WWE
2020	"The Fiend" Bray Wyatt	WWE
2021	Alexa Bliss	WWE
2022	Maximum Male Models	WWE
2023	The Devil	All Elite Wrestling
2024	The Learning Tree	All Elite Wrestling
2025	Heel John Cena	WWE

==== Best Pro Wrestling Book ====
Year	Book	Author(s)
2005	The Death of WCW	Bryan Alvarez and R.D. Reynolds
2006	Tangled Ropes	"Superstar" Billy Graham and Keith Elliot Greenberg
2007	Hitman: My Real Life in the Cartoon World of Wrestling	Bret Hart
2008	Gorgeous George: The Bad Boy Wrestler Who Created American Pop Culture	John Capouya
2009	Midnight Express 25th Anniversary Scrapbook	Jim Cornette
2010	Countdown to Lockdown	Mick Foley
2011	Undisputed: How to Become the World Champion in 1,372 Easy Steps	Chris Jericho
2012	Shooters: The Toughest Men in Professional Wrestling	Jonathan Snowden
2013	Mad Dogs, Midgets and Screw Jobs: The Untold Story of How Montreal Shaped the World of Wrestling	Pat Laprade and Bertrand Hébert
2014	The Death of WCW – 10th Anniversary Edition	Bryan Alvarez and R.D. Reynolds
2015	Yes!: My Improbable Journey to the Main Event of WrestleMania	Daniel Bryan and Craig Tello
2016	Ali vs. Inoki	Josh Gross
2017	Crazy Like a Fox: The Definitive Chronicle of Brian Pillman 20 Years Later	Liam O'Rourke
2018	Eggshells: Pro Wrestling in the Tokyo Dome	Chris Charlton
2019	100 Things a WWE Fan Should Know & Do Before They Die	Bryan Alvarez
2020	Killing the Business	The Young Bucks
2021	Mox	Jon Moxley
2022	Blood and Fire: The Unbelievable Real-Life Story of Wrestling's Original Sheik	Brian Solomon
2023	The Last Real World Champion: The Legacy of "Nature Boy" Ric Flair	Tim Hornbaker
2024	Becky Lynch: The Man: Not Your Average Average Girl	Rebecca Quin
2025	The Irresistible Force: The Life and Times of Gorilla Monsoon	Brian Solomon

==== Best Pro Wrestling Documentary ====
Note: Was previously known as the "Best Pro Wrestling DVD" and "Best Wrestling DVD/Streaming Documentary" award.

WWE has won the award a record 11 times.

Year	Documentary	Publisher(s)
2005	The Rise and Fall of ECW	World Wrestling Entertainment/WWE
2006	Bret "Hit Man" Hart: The Best There Is, The Best There Was, The Best There Ever Will Be	World Wrestling Entertainment/WWE
2007	Ric Flair and the Four Horsemen	World Wrestling Entertainment/WWE
2008	"Nature Boy" Ric Flair: The Definitive Collection	World Wrestling Entertainment/WWE
2009	Macho Madness: The Randy Savage Ultimate Collection	World Wrestling Entertainment/WWE
2010	Breaking the Code: Behind the Walls of Chris Jericho	World Wrestling Entertainment/WWE
2011	Shawn Michaels vs. Bret Hart: WWE's Greatest Rivalries	World Wrestling Entertainment/WWE
2012	CM Punk: Best in the World	World Wrestling Entertainment/WWE
2013	Jim Crockett Promotions: The Good Old Days	EllBow Productions; Highspots.com
2014	Ladies and Gentlemen, My Name Is Paul Heyman	WWE
2015	Daniel Bryan: Just Say Yes! Yes! Yes!	WWE
2016	WWE 24: Seth Rollins (Redesign, Rebuild, Reclaim)	WWE
2017	30 for 30: Nature Boy	ESPN
2018	André the Giant	HBO
2019	Dark Side of the Ring	Viceland
2020	Dark Side of the Ring: Owen Hart	Viceland
2021	Dark Side of the Ring: Brian Pillman	Viceland
2022	Tales From the Territories: Lawler/Kaufman	Viceland
2023	Dark Side of the Ring: Chris and Tammy	Viceland
2024	Mr. McMahon	Netflix
2025	Dark Side of the Ring: Daffney	Viceland

==== Shad Gaspard/Jon Huber Memorial Award ====
Note: This award is given to participants in professional wrestling and mixed martial arts who make contributions outside the ring for the betterment of society.

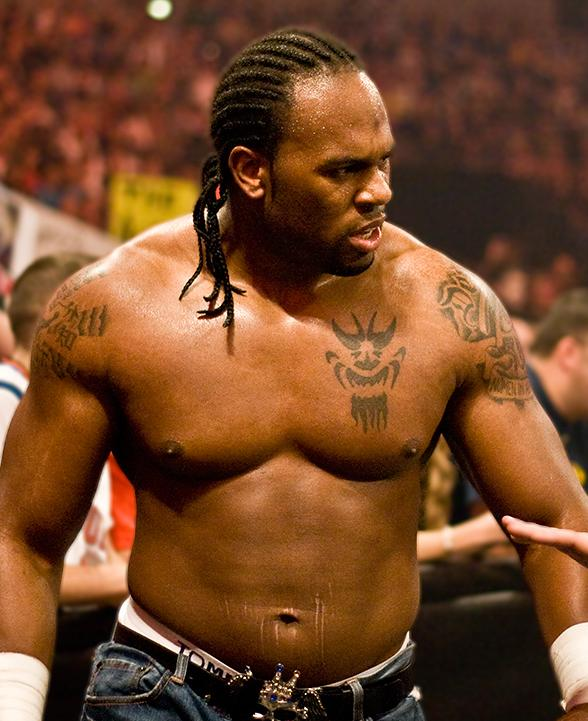
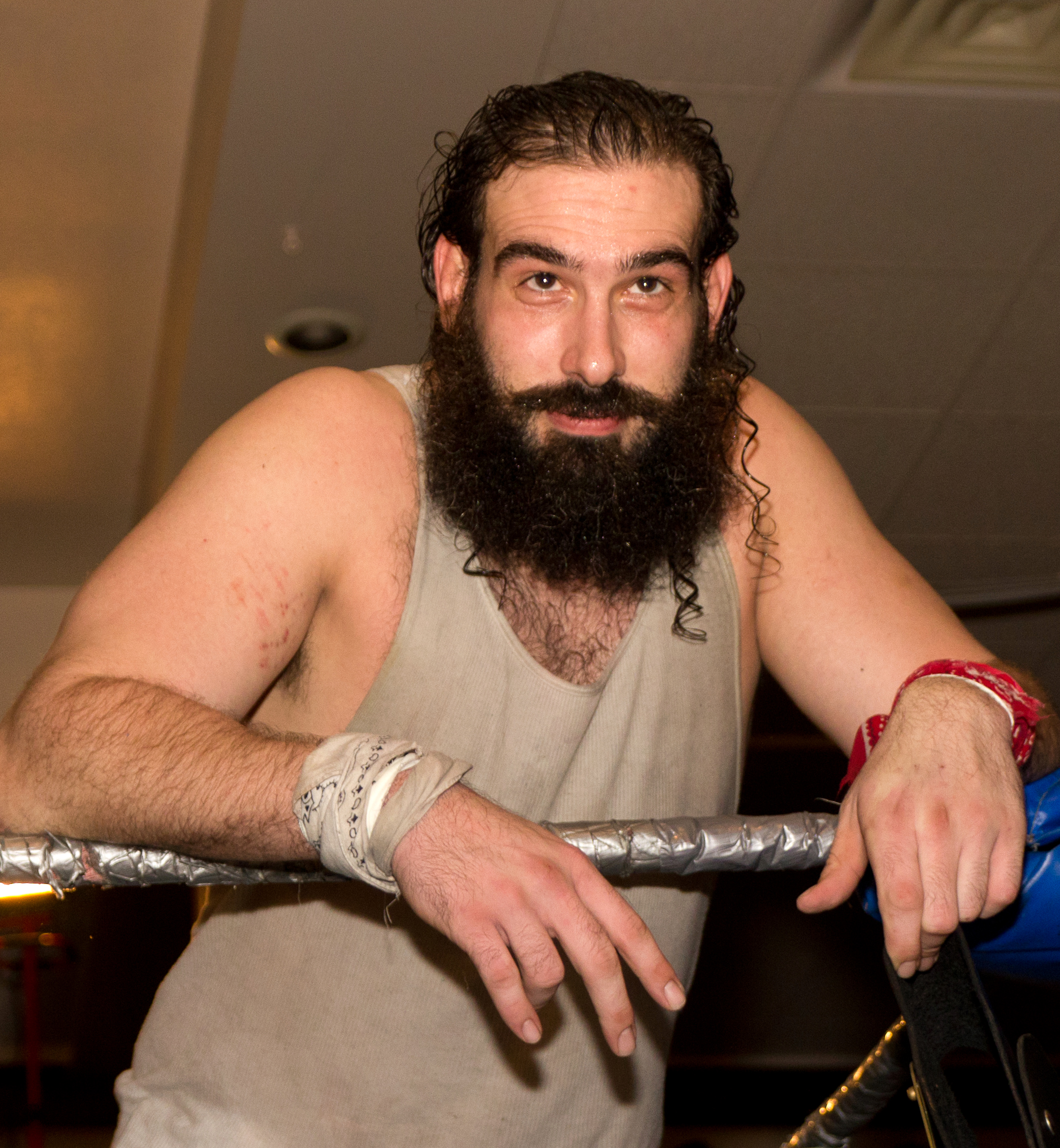
Shad Gaspard and Jon Huber are the co-namesakes of the category.

Year	Recipient(s)	Contribution(s)
2020	Shad Gaspard	Sacrificed himself to save his son's life after being swept out to sea
2020	Ettore Ewen; Big E	Contributed to racial justice during the Black Lives Matter movement and following the murder of George Floyd
2020	Rami Sebei; Sami Zayn	Runs Sami for Syria, a medical relief organization assisting ill and injured people during the Syrian civil war
2020	Tracy Smothers	Assisted young independent wrestlers
2020	Margaret Stalvey	Assisted the Huber family during Jon Huber's illness and after his death
2020	Megha Parekh	Assisted the Huber family during Jon Huber's illness and after his death
2021	Jon Moxley	Chose to step away from professional wrestling to enter into a rehabilitation program for alcoholism
2021	Thaddeus Bullard; Titus O'Neil	The child of a rape victim, O'Neil went on to help underprivileged children through his charitable work, especially in his hometown of Tampa, Florida
2022	Dustin Poirier	Through his Good Fight Foundation, Poirier provided assistance to underserved and vulnerable communities in South Louisiana
2023	Steve McMichael	McMichael, who has been battling amyotrophic lateral sclerosis since 2021, has provided inspiration to those battling illnesses due to his continued determination to attend the Pro Football Hall of Fame induction ceremony after being elected to the hall
2023	Pugh family	The family showed class and resiliency after the death of Jamin Pugh in a car accident; despite the driver of the other car being at fault for the accident, they publicly asked people to stop attacking them on social media and fundraised for the driver's family
2023	Valerie Coleman	The widow of late Wrestling Observer Newsletter Hall of Famer "Superstar" Billy Graham, Coleman is credited with saving Graham's life on multiple occasions
2024	Mark Coleman	Saved his parents from a house fire, at the risk of his own life
2024	Daquan Johnson-Bey; Chris Bey	Showed resilience after suffering a career-threatening neck injury in the ring

== Defunct awards ==
=== Class A awards ===
==== Most Impressive Wrestler ====
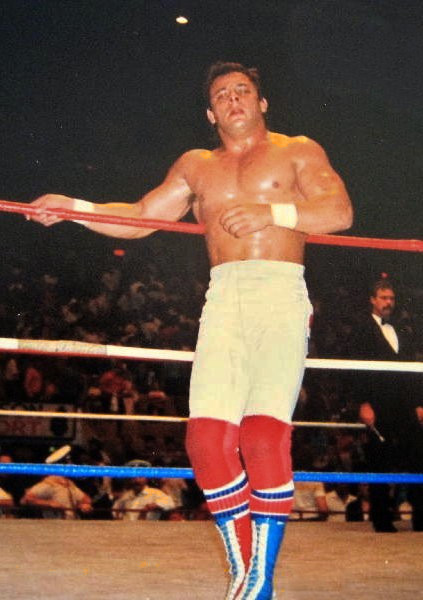
Dynamite Kid is a three-time winner of the category.

Year	Wrestler	Promotion(s)
1980	Ken Patera	World Wrestling Federation
1981	Don Muraco	World Wrestling Federation
1982	Tiger Mask	New Japan Pro-Wrestling; World Wrestling Federation; Empresa Mexicana de la Lucha Libre
1983	Dynamite Kid	Stampede Wrestling; National Wrestling Alliance
1984	Dynamite Kid	Stampede Wrestling; New Japan Pro-Wrestling; All Japan Pro Wrestling
1985	Dynamite Kid	World Wrestling Federation; All Japan Pro Wrestling

==== Most Washed Up Wrestler ====
Year	Wrestler	Promotion(s)
1980	Baron Scicluna	World Wrestling Federation
1981	Peter Maivia	National Wrestling Alliance
1982	"Superstar" Billy Graham	World Wrestling Federation; New Japan Pro-Wrestling
1983	Chief Jay Strongbow	World Wrestling Federation
1984	Jimmy Snuka	World Wrestling Federation
1985	Sgt. Slaughter	American Wrestling Association

==== Strongest Wrestler ====
Year	Wrestler	Promotion(s)
1981	Tony Atlas	World Wrestling Federation; National Wrestling Alliance
1982	Ken Patera	World Wrestling Federation
1983	Hulk Hogan	American Wrestling Association; New Japan Pro-Wrestling
1984	Butch Reed	Mid-South Wrestling; National Wrestling Alliance
1985	Road Warrior Animal	American Wrestling Association; National Wrestling Alliance; All Japan Pro Wrestling
1986	Road Warrior Animal	American Wrestling Association; National Wrestling Alliance; All Japan Pro Wrestling
1987	Steve Williams	Jim Crockett Promotions; Universal Wrestling Federation
1988	Steve Williams	Jim Crockett Promotions/World Championship Wrestling
1989	Steve Williams	Jim Crockett Promotions/World Championship Wrestling
1990	Steve Williams	All Japan Pro Wrestling

==== Best Three-Man Team ====
Year	Team	Promotion(s)
1983	The Fabulous Freebirds (Michael Hayes, Terry Gordy & Buddy Roberts)	World Class Championship Wrestling; National Wrestling Alliance

==== Most Unimproved ====
Year	Wrestler	Promotion(s)
1984	Jimmy Snuka	World Wrestling Federation
1985	Sgt. Slaughter	American Wrestling Association
1986	Bob Orton	World Wrestling Federation
1987	Butch Reed	World Wrestling Federation
1988	Bam Bam Bigelow	World Wrestling Federation
1989	Jim Duggan	World Wrestling Federation
1990	Sting	World Championship Wrestling
1991	Davey Boy Smith	World Wrestling Federation
1992	Randy Savage	World Wrestling Federation
1993	Rick Rude	World Championship Wrestling
1994	Hulk Hogan	World Championship Wrestling
1995	Hulk Hogan	World Championship Wrestling

==== Most Obnoxious ====
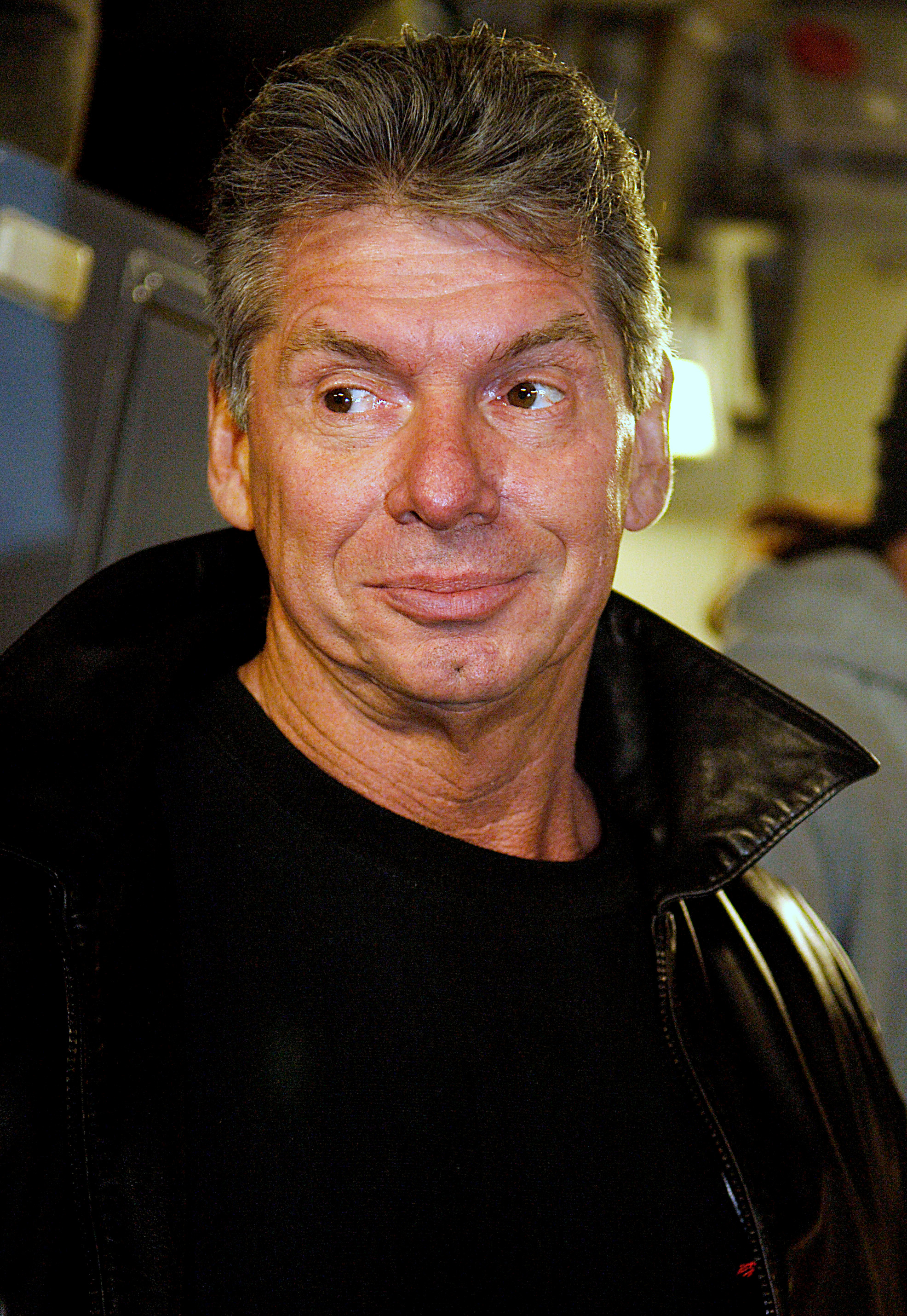
Vince McMahon is a six-time winner of the category.

Year	Performer	Promotion(s)
1981	Gene LeBell	National Wrestling Alliance
1982	David Crockett	National Wrestling Alliance
1983	Vince McMahon	World Wrestling Federation
1984	Vince McMahon	World Wrestling Federation
1985	Vince McMahon	World Wrestling Federation
1986	Vince McMahon	World Wrestling Federation
1987	David Crockett	Jim Crockett Promotions
1988	Dusty Rhodes	Jim Crockett Promotions
1989	Dusty Rhodes	World Championship Wrestling
1990	Vince McMahon	World Wrestling Federation
1991	Herb Abrams	Universal Wrestling Federation
1992	Bill Watts	World Championship Wrestling
1993	Vince McMahon	World Wrestling Federation
1994	Hulk Hogan	World Championship Wrestling
1995	Hulk Hogan	World Championship Wrestling

==== Best Babyface ====
Note: "Best Babyface" and "Best Heel" were combined in 1997 to create "Best Box Office Draw"

Year	Wrestler	Promotion(s)
1980	Dusty Rhodes	National Wrestling Alliance
1981	Tommy Rich	National Wrestling Alliance
1982	Hulk Hogan	American Wrestling Association; New Japan Pro-Wrestling
1983	Hulk Hogan	American Wrestling Association; New Japan Pro-Wrestling
1984	Hulk Hogan	World Wrestling Federation
1985	Hulk Hogan	World Wrestling Federation
1986	Hulk Hogan	World Wrestling Federation
1987	Hulk Hogan	World Wrestling Federation
1988	Hulk Hogan	World Wrestling Federation
1989	Hulk Hogan	World Wrestling Federation
1990	Hulk Hogan	World Wrestling Federation
1991	Hulk Hogan	World Wrestling Federation
1992	Sting	World Championship Wrestling
1993	Atsushi Onita	Frontier Martial-Arts Wrestling
1994	Atsushi Onita	Frontier Martial-Arts Wrestling
1995	Perro Aguayo	Asistencia Asesoría y Administración
1996	Shawn Michaels	World Wrestling Federation

==== Best Heel ====
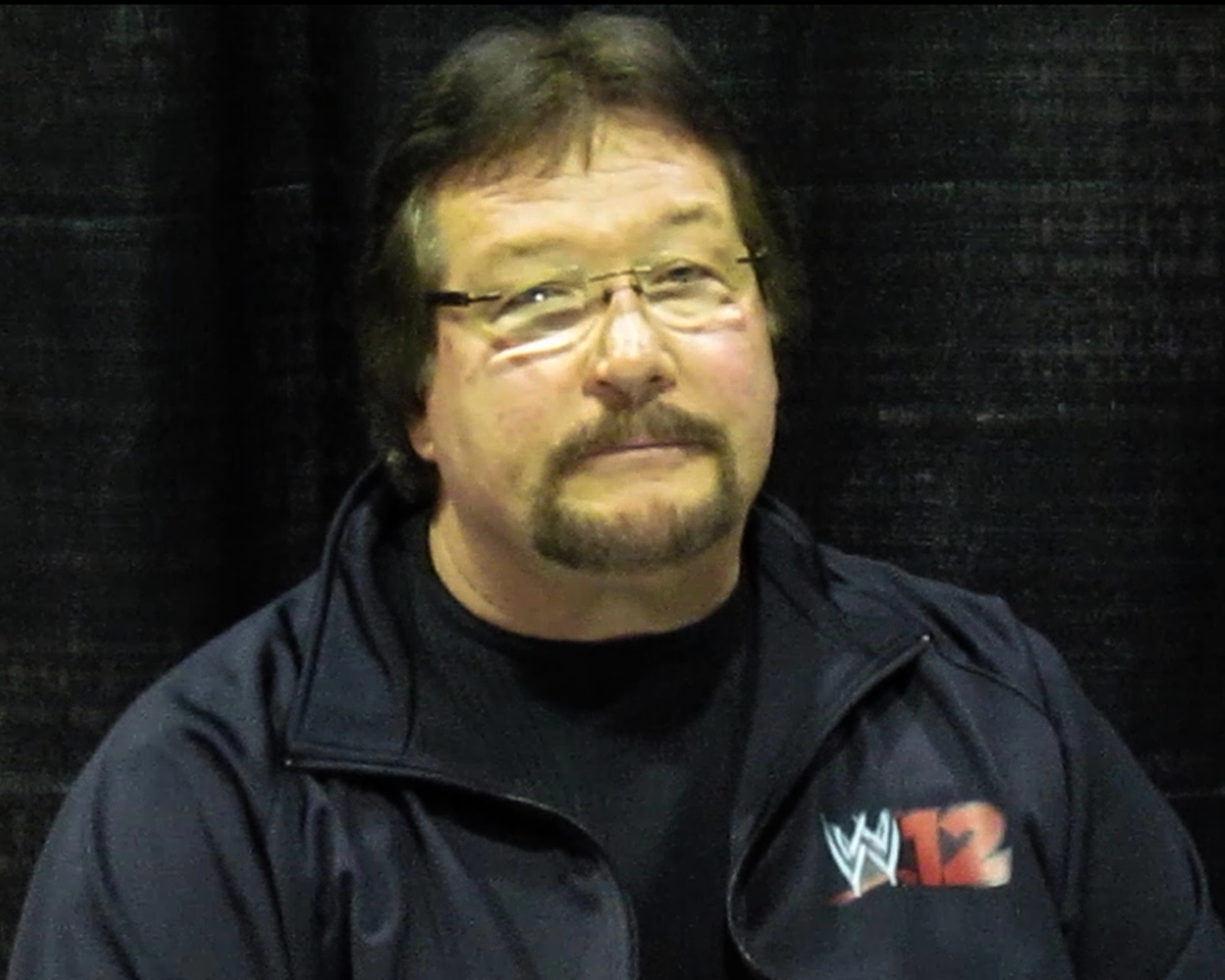
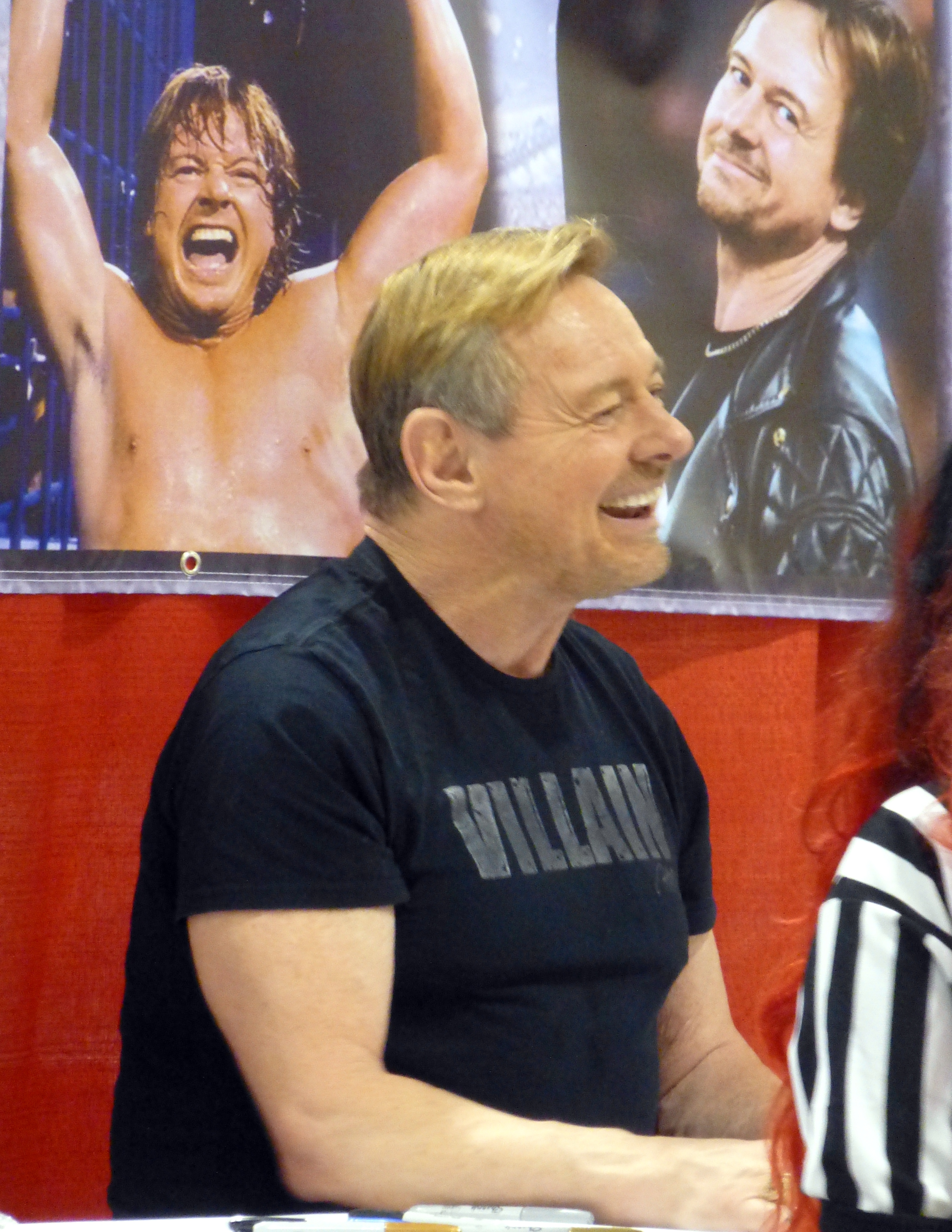
Ted DiBiase and Roddy Piper are two-time winners of the category.

Year	Wrestler	Promotion(s)
1980	Larry Zbyszko	World Wrestling Federation
1981	Don Muraco	World Wrestling Federation
1982	Buzz Sawyer	Georgia Championship Wrestling
1983	Michael Hayes	World Class Championship Wrestling
1984	Roddy Piper	World Wrestling Federation
1985	Roddy Piper	World Wrestling Federation
1986	Michael Hayes	World Class Championship Wrestling
1987	Ted DiBiase	World Wrestling Federation
1988	Ted DiBiase	World Wrestling Federation
1989	Terry Funk	World Championship Wrestling
1990	Ric Flair	World Championship Wrestling
1991	The Undertaker	World Wrestling Federation
1992	Rick Rude	World Championship Wrestling
1993	Vader	World Championship Wrestling
1994	Art Barr	Asistencia Asesoría y Administración
1995	Masahiro Chono	New Japan Pro-Wrestling
1996	Stone Cold Steve Austin	World Wrestling Federation

==== Biggest Shock of the Year ====
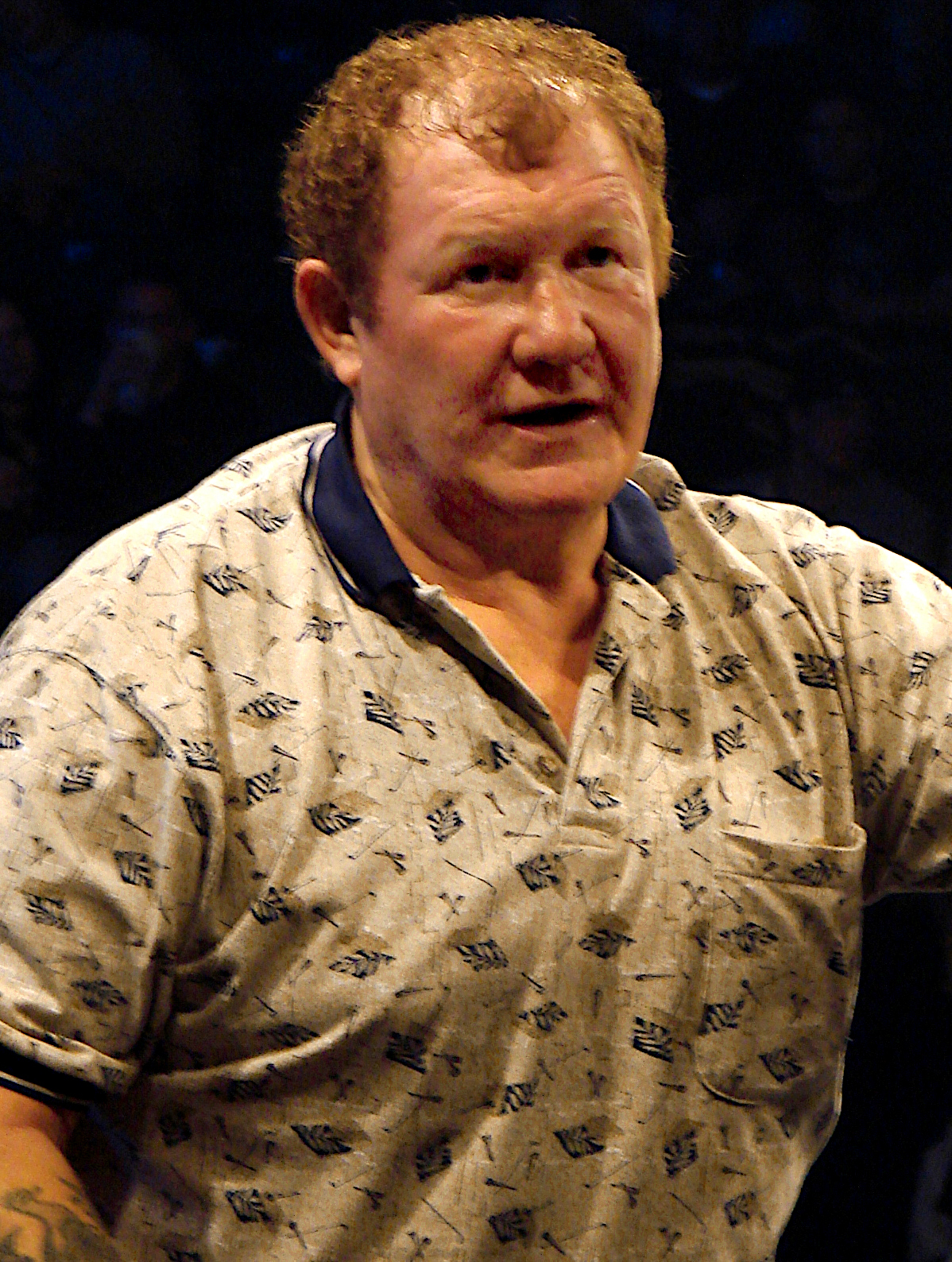
Harley Race has been named in two Biggest Shock of the Year.

Year	Event
1981	Tommy Rich winning the NWA World Championship from Harley Race
1982	Otto Wanz winning the AWA World Heavyweight Championship
1983	Ric Flair losing the NWA Championship to Harley Race
1984	The death of David Von Erich
1985	WWF getting on network television
1986	Magnum T. A.'s car accident
1987	Jim Crockett Jr. purchasing the Universal Wrestling Federation
1988	The murder of Bruiser Brody
1989	Dusty Rhodes joining the WWF

==== Hardest Worker ====
Year	Wrestler	Promotion(s)
1982	Ric Flair	National Wrestling Alliance
1983	Dynamite Kid	Stampede Wrestling; National Wrestling Alliance
1984	Ric Flair	National Wrestling Alliance
1985	Ric Flair	Jim Crockett Promotions
1986	Ric Flair	Jim Crockett Promotions
1987	Ric Flair	Jim Crockett Promotions
1988	Ric Flair	Jim Crockett Promotions
1989	Terry Funk	World Championship Wrestling

==== Manager of the Year ====
Year	Manager	Promotion(s)
1983	Jimmy Hart	Continental Wrestling Association
1984	Jim Cornette	Mid-South Wrestling; World Class Championship Wrestling
1985	Jim Cornette	Jim Crockett Promotions
1986	Jim Cornette	Jim Crockett Promotions
1987	Jim Cornette	Jim Crockett Promotions
1988	Jim Cornette	Jim Crockett Promotions
1989	Jim Cornette	World Championship Wrestling
1990	Jim Cornette	World Championship Wrestling
1991	Sherri Martel	World Wrestling Federation
1992	Jim Cornette	Smoky Mountain Wrestling
1993	Jim Cornette	Smoky Mountain Wrestling
1994	Jim Cornette	Smoky Mountain Wrestling
1995	Jim Cornette	World Wrestling Federation; Smoky Mountain Wrestling
1996	Jim Cornette	World Wrestling Federation; Smoky Mountain Wrestling

=== Class B awards ===
==== Best Color Commentator ====
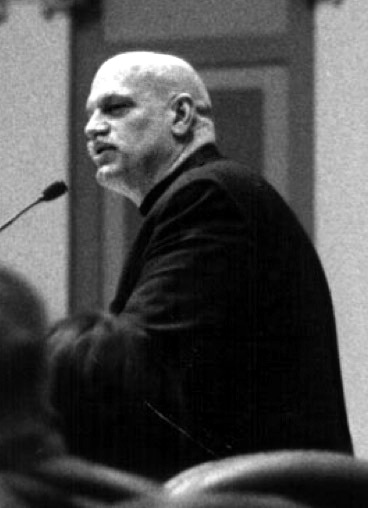
Jesse Ventura is a four-time winner of the category.

Year	Commentator	Promotion(s)
1986	Michael Hayes	Universal Wrestling Federation
1987	Jesse Ventura	World Wrestling Federation
1988	Jesse Ventura	World Wrestling Federation
1989	Jesse Ventura	World Wrestling Federation
1990	Jesse Ventura	World Wrestling Federation
1991	Paul E. Dangerously	World Championship Wrestling
1992	Bobby Heenan	World Wrestling Federation
1993	Bobby Heenan	World Wrestling Federation
1994	Bobby Heenan	World Championship Wrestling
1995	Jerry Lawler	World Wrestling Federation
1996	Jerry Lawler	World Wrestling Federation

==== Readers' Favorite Wrestler ====
Year	Wrestler	Promotion(s)
1984	Ric Flair	Jim Crockett Promotions
1985	Ric Flair	Jim Crockett Promotions
1986	Ric Flair	Jim Crockett Promotions
1987	Ric Flair	Jim Crockett Promotions
1988	Ric Flair	Jim Crockett Promotions
1989	Ric Flair	World Championship Wrestling
1990	Ric Flair	World Championship Wrestling
1991	Ric Flair	World Championship Wrestling; World Wrestling Federation
1992	Ric Flair	World Wrestling Federation
1993	Ric Flair	World Wrestling Federation; World Championship Wrestling
1994	Sabu	Extreme Championship Wrestling; Frontier Martial-Arts Wrestling
1995	Manami Toyota	All Japan Women's Pro-Wrestling
1996	Ric Flair	World Championship Wrestling
1997	Chris Benoit	World Championship Wrestling
1998	Mick Foley	World Wrestling Federation
1999	Chris Jericho	World Championship Wrestling; World Wrestling Federation
2000	Chris Benoit	World Championship Wrestling; World Wrestling Federation
2001	Keiji Muto	New Japan Pro-Wrestling; All Japan Pro Wrestling
2002	Kurt Angle	World Wrestling Entertainment
2003	Kurt Angle	World Wrestling Entertainment

==== Readers' Least Favorite Wrestler ====
Year	Wrestler	Promotion(s)
1984	Ivan Putski	World Wrestling Federation
1985	Hulk Hogan	World Wrestling Federation
1986	Hulk Hogan	World Wrestling Federation
1987	Dusty Rhodes	Jim Crockett Promotions
1988	Dusty Rhodes	Jim Crockett Promotions
1989	Ultimate Warrior	World Wrestling Federation
1990	Ultimate Warrior	World Wrestling Federation
1991	Hulk Hogan	World Wrestling Federation
1992	Erik Watts	World Championship Wrestling
1993	Sid Vicious	World Championship Wrestling
1994	Hulk Hogan	World Championship Wrestling
1995	Hulk Hogan	World Championship Wrestling
1996	Hulk Hogan	World Championship Wrestling
1997	Hulk Hogan	World Championship Wrestling
1998	Hulk Hogan	World Championship Wrestling
1999	Hulk Hogan	World Championship Wrestling
2000	Kevin Nash	World Championship Wrestling
2001	The Undertaker	World Wrestling Federation/Entertainment
2002	Triple H	World Wrestling Federation/Entertainment
2003	Triple H	World Wrestling Federation/Entertainment

==== Worst Wrestler ====
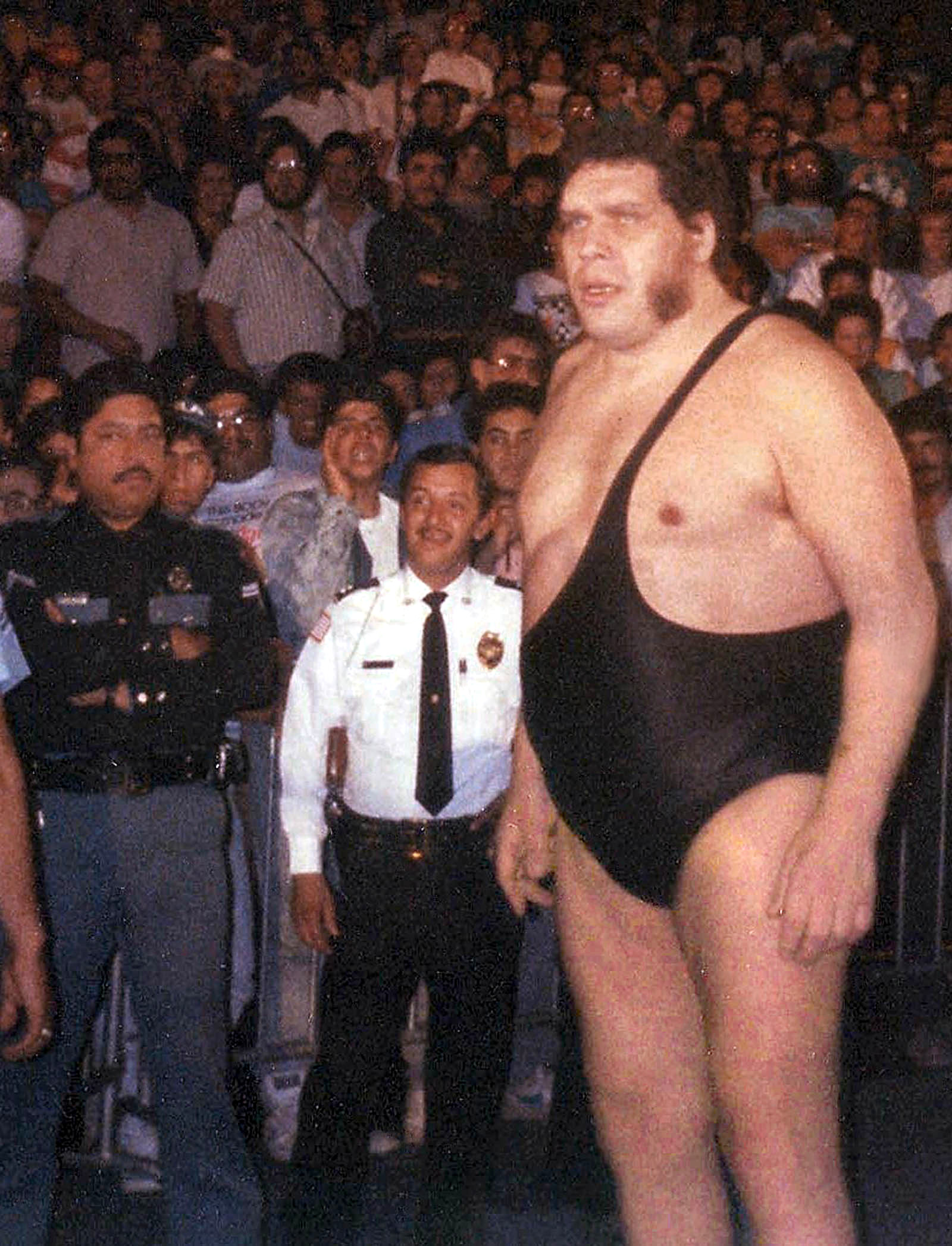
André the Giant is a three-time winner of the category.

Year	Wrestler	Promotion(s)
1984	Ivan Putski	World Wrestling Federation
1985	Uncle Elmer	World Wrestling Federation
1986	Mike Von Erich	World Class Championship Wrestling
1987	Junkyard Dog	World Wrestling Federation
1988	Ultimate Warrior	World Wrestling Federation
1989	André the Giant	World Wrestling Federation
1990	Junkyard Dog	World Championship Wrestling
1991	André the Giant	All Japan Pro Wrestling
1992	André the Giant	All Japan Pro Wrestling
1993	The Equalizer	World Championship Wrestling
1994	Dave Sullivan	World Championship Wrestling
1995	The Renegade	World Championship Wrestling
1996	Loch Ness	World Championship Wrestling
1997	Hulk Hogan	World Championship Wrestling
1998	Warrior	World Championship Wrestling
1999	Kevin Nash	World Championship Wrestling
2000	Kevin Nash	World Championship Wrestling
2001	Big Show	World Wrestling Federation/Entertainment
2002	Big Show	World Wrestling Federation/Entertainment
2003	Nathan Jones	World Wrestling Federation/Entertainment

==== Worst Tag Team ====
Year	Tag Team	Promotion(s)
1984	The Crusher and Baron von Raschke	American Wrestling Association
1985	The Hillbillies (Uncle Elmer and Cousin Junior)	World Wrestling Federation
1986	George Steele and Junkyard Dog	World Wrestling Federation
1987	Jimmy Valiant and Bugsy McGraw	National Wrestling Alliance
1988	The Bolsheviks (Nikolai Volkoff and Boris Zhukov)	World Wrestling Federation
1989	The Powers of Pain (The Barbarian and The Warlord)	World Wrestling Federation
1990	Giant Baba and André the Giant	All Japan Pro Wrestling
1991	Giant Baba and André the Giant	All Japan Pro Wrestling
1992	The Bushwhackers (Luke Williams and Butch Miller)	World Wrestling Federation
1993	The Colossal Kongs (King Kong and Awesome Kong)	World Championship Wrestling
1994	The Bushwhackers	World Wrestling Federation
1995	Dick Slater and Bunkhouse Buck	World Championship Wrestling
1996	The Godwinns (Henry Godwinn and Phineas Godwinn)	World Wrestling Federation
1997	The Godwinns (Henry Godwinn and Phineas Godwinn)	World Wrestling Federation
1998	The Oddities (Golga and Kurrgan)	World Wrestling Federation
1999	The Corporate Ministry (Viscera and Mideon)	World Wrestling Federation
2000	KroniK (Brian Adams and Bryan Clark)	World Championship Wrestling
2001	KroniK (Brian Adams and Bryan Clark)	World Championship Wrestling; World Wrestling Federation
2002	3-Minute Warning (Rosey and Jamal)	World Wrestling Entertainment
2003	La Résistance (René Duprée and Sylvain Grenier)	World Wrestling Entertainment

==== Worst Manager ====
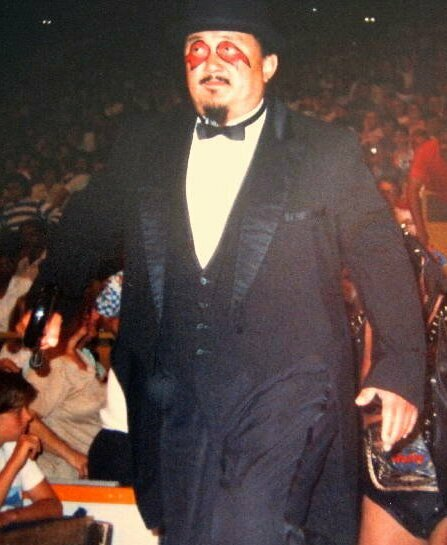
Mr. Fuji is an eleven-time winner of the category.

Year	Manager	Promotion(s)
1984	Mr. Fuji	World Wrestling Federation
1985	Mr. Fuji	World Wrestling Federation
1986	Paul Jones	Jim Crockett Promotions
1987	Mr. Fuji	World Wrestling Federation
1988	Mr. Fuji	World Wrestling Federation
1989	Mr. Fuji	World Wrestling Federation
1990	Mr. Fuji	World Wrestling Federation
1991	Mr. Fuji	World Wrestling Federation
1992	Mr. Fuji	World Wrestling Federation
1993	Mr. Fuji	World Wrestling Federation
1994	Mr. Fuji	World Wrestling Federation
1995	Mr. Fuji	World Wrestling Federation
1996	Sonny Onoo	World Championship Wrestling
1997	Sonny Onoo	World Championship Wrestling
1998	Sonny Onoo	World Championship Wrestling
1999	Sonny Onoo	World Championship Wrestling

==== Worst on Interviews ====
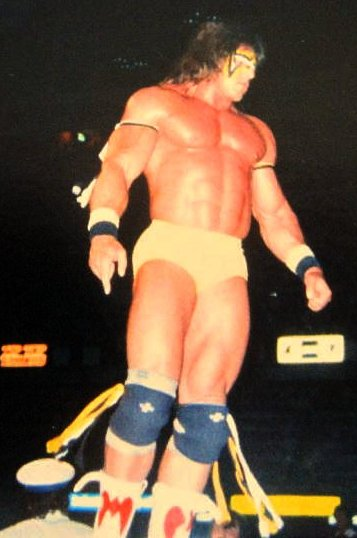
Ultimate Warrior is a five-time winner of the category.

Year	Performer	Promotion(s)
1984	Jimmy Snuka	World Wrestling Federation
1985	Thunderbolt Patterson	National Wrestling Alliance
1986	Mike Von Erich	World Class Championship Wrestling
1987	Bugsy McGraw	Jim Crockett Promotions
1988	Steve Williams	Jim Crockett Promotions
1989	Ultimate Warrior	World Wrestling Federation
1990	Ultimate Warrior	World Wrestling Federation
1991	Ultimate Warrior	World Wrestling Federation
1992	Ultimate Warrior	World Wrestling Federation
1993	Mr. Fuji	World Wrestling Federation
1994	Dave Sullivan	World Championship Wrestling
1995	Hulk Hogan	World Championship Wrestling
1996	Ahmed Johnson	World Wrestling Federation
1997	Ahmed Johnson	World Wrestling Federation
1998	Warrior	World Championship Wrestling
1999	Sid Vicious	World Championship Wrestling
2000	Vince Russo	World Championship Wrestling
2001	Stephanie McMahon	World Wrestling Federation/Entertainment
2002	Stephanie McMahon	World Wrestling Federation/Entertainment
2003	Stephanie McMahon	World Wrestling Federation/Entertainment

==== Most Embarrassing Wrestler ====
Year	Wrestler	Promotion(s)
1986	Adrian Adonis	World Wrestling Federation
1987	George Steele	World Wrestling Federation
1988	George Steele	World Wrestling Federation
1989	André the Giant	World Wrestling Federation
1990	Dusty Rhodes	World Wrestling Federation
1991	Van Hammer	World Championship Wrestling
1992	Papa Shango	World Wrestling Federation
1993	Bastion Booger	World Wrestling Federation
1994	Doink the Clown	World Wrestling Federation
1995	Hulk Hogan	World Championship Wrestling
1996	Hulk Hogan	World Championship Wrestling
1997	The Artist Formerly Known As Goldust	World Wrestling Federation
1998	Warrior	World Championship Wrestling
1999	Hulk Hogan	World Championship Wrestling
2000	Hulk Hogan	World Championship Wrestling
2001	Buff Bagwell	World Championship Wrestling; World Wrestling Federation
2002	Big Show	World Wrestling Federation/Entertainment
2003	Nathan Jones	World Wrestling Federation/Entertainment

==== Worst Non-Wrestling Personality ====
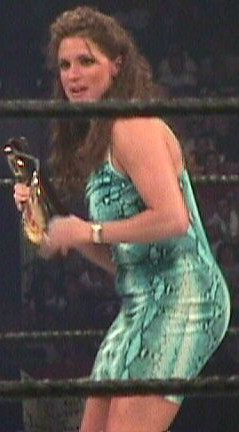
Stephanie McMahon is a three-time winner of the category.

Year	Personality	Promotion
2000	Vince Russo	World Championship Wrestling
2001	Stephanie McMahon	World Wrestling Federation/Entertainment
2002	Stephanie McMahon	World Wrestling Federation/Entertainment
2003	Stephanie McMahon	World Wrestling Federation/Entertainment

== Wrestling Observer Decade Awards ==
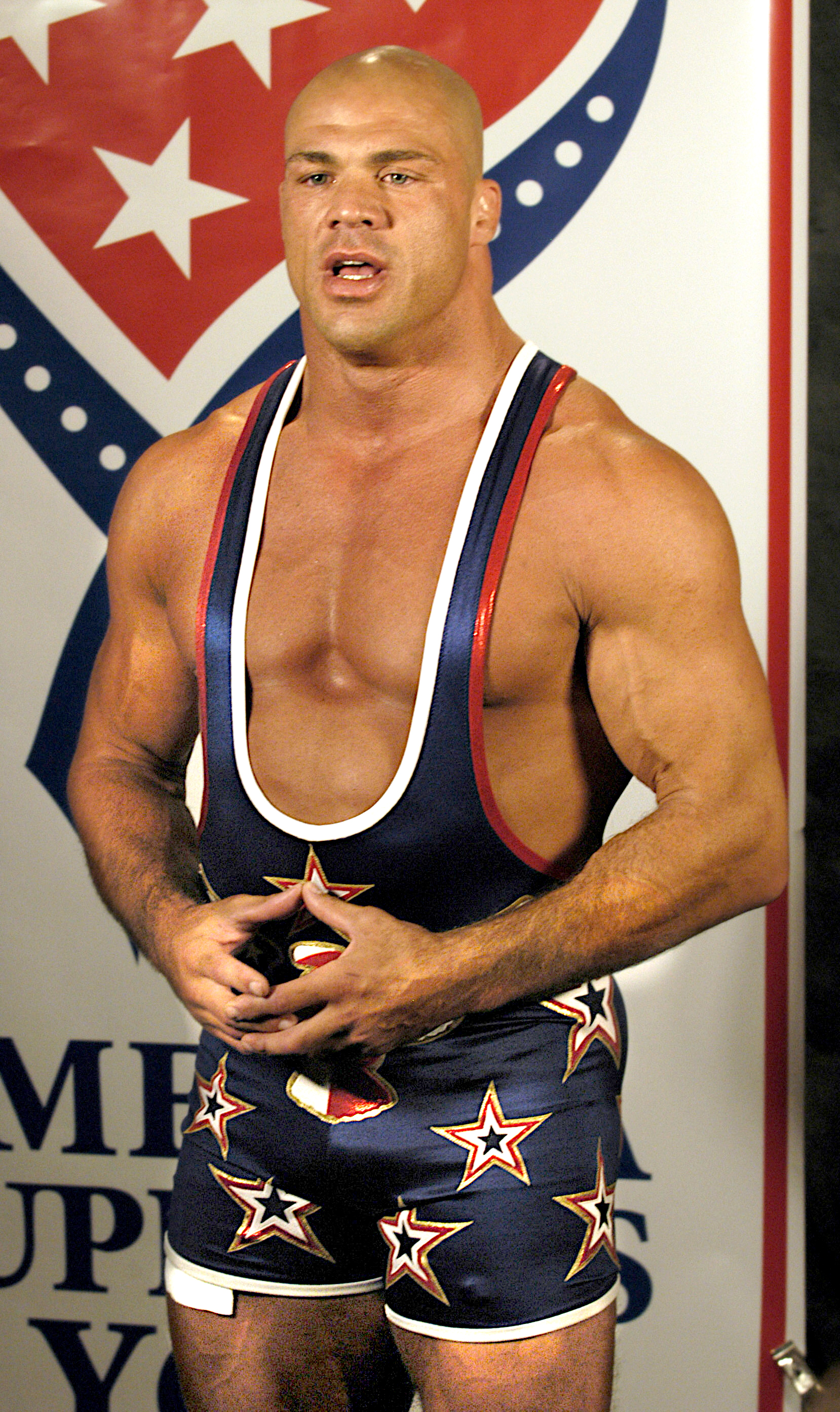
Kurt Angle, best wrestler of the 2000s

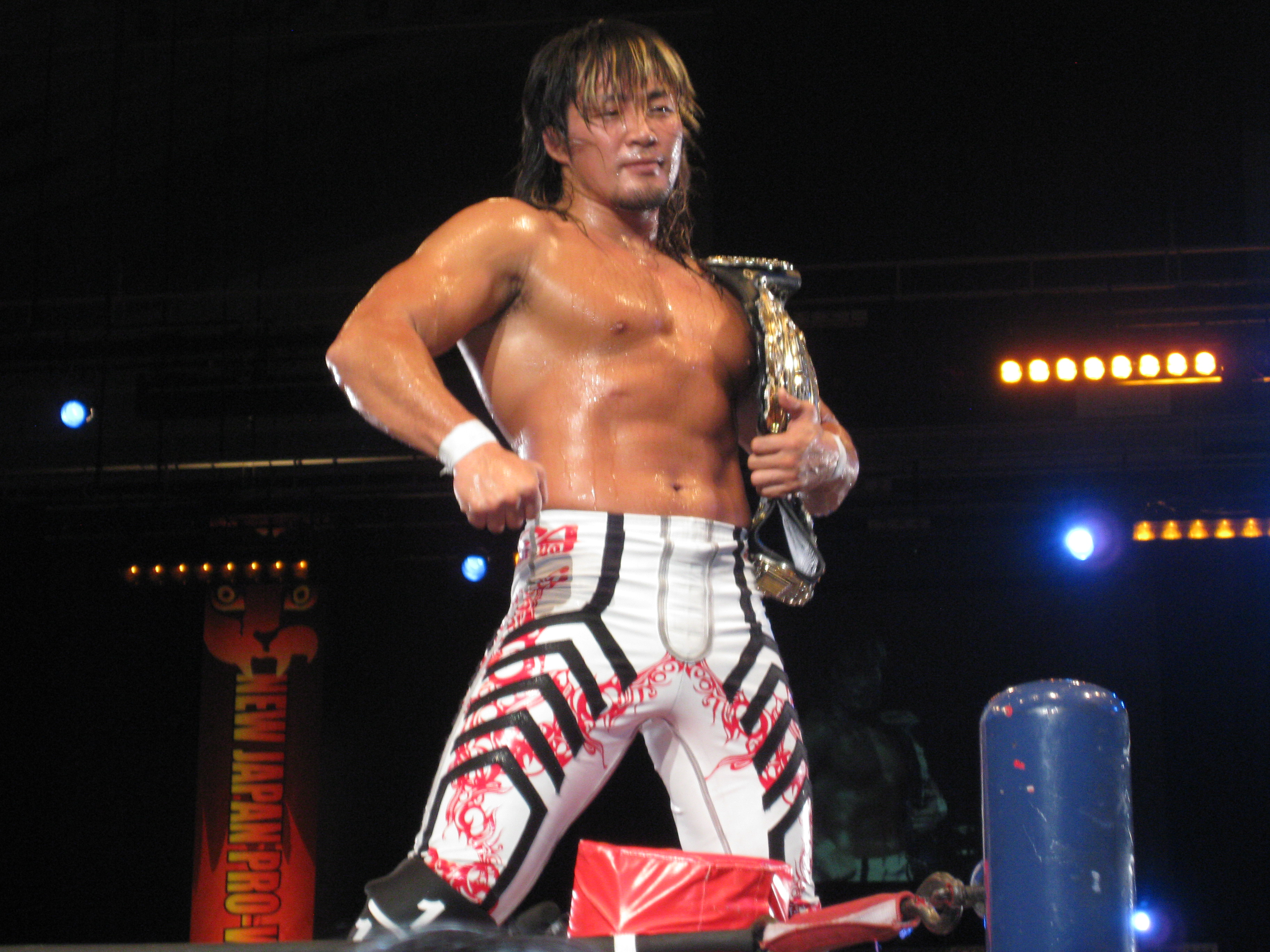
Hiroshi Tanahashi, best wrestler of the 2010s

=== 1990s ===
- Fighter of the Decade: Frank Shamrock

=== 2000s ===
- Best Wrestler: Kurt Angle
- Most Outstanding Wrestler: Bryan Danielson/Daniel Bryan
- Best Box Office Draw: Místico
- Best Tag Team: Rey Bucanero and Último Guerrero
- Best Interviews: Chris Jericho
- Most Charismatic: John Cena
- MMA Most Valuable: Randy Couture

=== 2010s ===
- Best Wrestler: Hiroshi Tanahashi
- Most Outstanding Wrestler: Kazuchika Okada
- Best Box Office Draw: Brock Lesnar
- Best Tag Team: The Young Bucks
- Best Interviews: Paul Heyman
- Most Charismatic: Hiroshi Tanahashi
- Best Technical Wrestler: Zack Sabre Jr.
- Best Brawler: Tomohiro Ishii
- Best Flyer: Ricochet
- Best Promotion: New Japan Pro-Wrestling
- Best Matches: Kazuchika Okada
- Best Non-Wrestler: Paul Heyman
- Best Television Announcer: Kevin Kelly

== See also ==
- Wrestling Observer Newsletter Hall of Fame
- List of professional wrestling awards
- List of Pro Wrestling Illustrated awards
- Slammy Award

== Sources ==
- Meltzer, Dave (January 26, 2011). "The 2011 Wrestling Observer Newsletter Awards Issue". Wrestling Observer Newsletter (5). Campbell, California: 1–40. ISSN 1083-9593. "The following are the results of the 31st annual Wrestling Observer Newsletter readership awards, along with a listing of the previous winners in the various categories."
- Meltzer, Dave (January 30, 2012). "Jan 30 Wrestling Observer Newsletter: Gigantic year-end awards issue, best and worst in all categories plus UFC on FX 1, death of Savannah Jack, ratings, tons and tons of news". Wrestling Observer Newsletter. Campbell, California: 1–29. ISSN 1083-9593.
- Meltzer, Dave (January 23, 2013). "The 2012 Wrestling Observer Newsletter Annual Awards Issue". Wrestling Observer Newsletter. Campbell, California: 1–52. ISSN 1083-9593.
- Meltzer, Dave (January 27, 2014). "The 2013 Wrestling Observer Newsletter Annual Awards Issue". Wrestling Observer Newsletter. Campbell, California: 1–36. ISSN 1083-9593.
- Meltzer, Dave (January 26, 2015). "2014 Wrestling Observer Newsletter awards". Wrestling Observer Newsletter. Campbell, California: 1–35. ISSN 1083-9593.
- Meltzer, Dave (January 25, 2016). "January 25, 2016 Wrestling Observer Newsletter: 2015 Observer Awards Issue". Wrestling Observer Newsletter. Campbell, California: 1–49. ISSN 1083-9593.
