= Deaths in December 1995 =

The following is a list of notable deaths in December 1995.

Entries for each day are listed alphabetically by surname. A typical entry lists information in the following sequence:

- Name, age, country of citizenship at birth, subsequent country of citizenship (if applicable), reason for notability, cause of death (if known), and reference.

== December 1995 ==
=== 1 ===
- Dennis Allen, 55, American actor and comedian.
- Emil Banjavic, 80, American football player (Detroit Lions).
- O. Roy Chalk, 88, American entrepreneur.
- Vaman Krushna Chorghade, 81, Indian writer and educator.
- John Dylan, 17, Thai actor.
- Luigi Giacobbe, 88, Italian cyclist.
- Henry Holbert, 68, American football player and coach.
- Martti Liimo, 54, Finnish basketball player and Olympian (1964).
- Sergio Pesce, 79, Italian cinematographer.
- Colin Tapley, 88, New Zealand actor.
- Maxwell R. Thurman, 64, American Army general, leukemia.

=== 2 ===
- Robertson Davies, 82, Canadian novelist, heart attack.
- Art Herring, 89, American baseball player.
- Roxie Roker, 66, American actress (The Jeffersons), breast cancer.
- Mária Telkes, 94, Hungarian-American biophysicist, scientist and inventor.
- Biem Dudok van Heel, 77, Dutch Olympic sailor (1948, 1952, 1960).
- Pekka Viljanen, 74, Finnish Olympic racewalker (1952).
- Ira Wallach, 82, American screenwriter and novelist, pneumonia.

=== 3 ===
- Hans Aardal, 74, Norwegian politician.
- Josep Bartolí, 85, Spanish painter, cartoonist and writer.
- Genni Batterham, 40, Australian film maker, writer and disability rights activist, multiple sclerosis.
- James Colgate Cleveland, 75, American politician, member of the United States House of Representatives (1963-1981).
- Jimmy Jewel, 85, British comedic actor.
- Alexander Kaidanovsky, 49, Soviet/Russian actor, film director and screenwriter, heart attack.
- Louise Lenormand, 94, French Olympic diver (1924).
- Lautaro Murúa, 68, Chilean-Argentine actor, film director, and screenwriter, lung cancer.
- Rodney Paavola, 56, American Olympic ice hockey player (1960).
- Gerard John Schaefer, 49, American murderer, serial killer, and police officer, stabbed.

=== 4 ===
- Warren Ambrose, 81, American mathematician.
- Little Beaver, 61, Canadian midget wrestler, pulmonary emphysema.
- Leonidas Berry, 93, American pioneer in gastroscopy and endoscopy.
- Giorgio Bocchino, 82, Italian Olympic fencer (1936).
- Petar Gligorovski, 57, Yugoslav and Macedonian animated film director and artist.
- Rudolf Hruska, 80, Austrian automobile designer and engineer.
- Robert Parrish, 79, American film director, editor, writer, and child actor.
- Jerry White, 47, American convicted murderer, execution by electrocution.

=== 5 ===
- Keith Aitken, 73, Australian rugby league footballer.
- Desmond Flower, 10th Viscount Ashbrook, 90, Irish peer and soldier.
- Ilio Bosi, 92, Italian communist politician and trade unionist.
- Reiner Bredemeyer, 66, German composer.
- Bill Bruton, 70, American Major League Baseball player (Milwaukee Braves, Detroit Tigers), traffic accident.
- L. B. Cole, 77, American comic book artist.
- Charles Evans, 77, British mountaineer, surgeon, and educator.
- Davor Jelaska, 88, Yugoslavian Olympic rower (1936).
- Victor Matthews, Baron Matthews, 76, British peer and proprietor of the Daily Express.
- Lisa McPherson, 36, American member of the Church of Scientology, pulmonary embolism.
- Clair Cameron Patterson, 73, American geochemist.
- Keith Runcorn, 73, British geophysicist.

=== 6 ===
- Yvonne Chauffin, 90, French writer and critic.
- Gerard Cowhig, 74, American gridiron football player (Los Angeles Rams, Chicago Cardinals, Philadelphia Eagles).
- Cosslett Ó Cuinn, 88, Irish Anglican priest and biblical scholar.
- Busta Jones, 44, American musician.
- John Kenerson, 57, American football player (Los Angeles Rams, Pittsburgh Steelers, New York Titans).
- Trevor Key, 48, British photographer, brain tumour.
- Melvin Kranzberg, 78, American historian.
- Margaret Mayall, 93, American astronomer.
- Jack Milne, 88, American speedway rider.
- Robert Earl O'Neal, 34, American white supremacist and convicted murderer, execution by lethal injection.
- Robert Phalen, 58, American actor (Halloween, Starman, Three Days of the Condor), complications from AIDS.
- Claire Polin, 69, American composer, flautist and musicologist.
- Luis Regueiro, 87, Spanish football player and Olympian (1928).
- James Reston, 86, American journalist.
- Mario Vicini, 82, Italian road bicycle racer.
- Dmitri Volkogonov, 67, Russian historian and Colonel general, brain cancer.

=== 7 ===
- James Derek Birchall, 65, English chemist, materials scientist, and inventor, traffic accident.
- Edmund D. Campbell, 96, American lawyer and politician.
- Harry Cavers, 85, Canadian politician.
- Nick Connor, 91, American politician.
- Mildred Adams Fenton, 96, American paleontologist and geologist.
- Kathleen Harrison, 103, English actress.
- Stella Inda, 71, Mexican film actress, pneumonia.
- Joe Kelly, 90, Australian politician.
- Sabahattin Kuruoğlu, 57, Turkish footballer.
- Johnny Mowers, 79, Canadian ice hockey player (Detroit Red Wings).
- Benn John Valsø, 68, Norwegian Olympic bobsledder (1948).
- Masashi Watanabe, 59, Japanese football player, manager, and Olympian (1964, 1968).

=== 8 ===
- James Austin, 82, American football player (Brooklyn Dodgers, Detroit Lions).
- Arthur Birch, 80, Australian organic chemist.
- Ernest L. Boyer, 67, American educator and United States Commissioner of Education.
- Tom Burns, 89, British-Chilean publisher and editor.
- Bill Coldwell, 63, English football manager and scout.
- John Gillett, 69–70, British film critic and researcher.
- George J. Lewis, 91, Mexican actor, stroke.
- Robert Manuel, 79, French actor and film director.
- Maino Neri, 71, Italian football player, manager, and Olympian (1948, 1952).
- Ding Shande, 84, Chinese composer.

=== 9 ===
- Severo Antonelli, 88, American photographer.
- Toni Cade Bambara, 56, American author, documentary film-maker, and social activist, colorectal cancer.
- Vivian Blaine, 74, American actress (Guys and Dolls) and singer, heart failure.
- Mario Brini, 87, Italian prelate.
- George Brown, 80, British Olympic sailor (1948).
- Pierre-Georges Castex, 80, French academic, literary critic and author.
- Hugh Clegg, 75, British academic and director, stroke.
- Tom Cole, 88–89, Australian labourer, outdoorsman and author.
- Benoit Comeau, 79, Canadian politician.
- Douglas Corrigan, 88, American aviator.
- Gwen Harwood, 75, Australian poet.
- Benny Lee, 79, Scottish comedy actor and singer.
- Gillian Rose, 48, British philosopher and non-fiction writer, ovarian cancer.
- Katharine Way, 93, American physicist.
- Hubert Louis Will, 81, American district judge (United States District Court for the Northern District of Illinois).

=== 10 ===
- Godfrey Agnew, 82, British civil servant.
- Alex Aronson, 83, German author.
- Kamal Bhattacharya, 80, Indian cricketer.
- Bonvi, 54, Italian comic book artist, car accident.
- Saša Božović, 83, Yugoslav partisan, physician, and author.
- Sarvadaman Chowla, 88, British-Indian American mathematician.
- Mary Lascelles, 95, British literary scholar.
- Paul Lohmann, 69, American cinematographer (Coffy, Nashville, Mommie Dearest).
- Lavinia Fitzalan-Howard, Duchess of Norfolk, 79, British noblewoman.
- Phil Piratin, 88, British communist politician.
- Darren Robinson, 28, American rapper, cardiac arrest, heart attack.

=== 11 ===
- Greg Bahnsen, 47, American Calvinist philosopher, apologist, and debater, complications following surgery.
- Étienne Becker, 59, French cinematographer.
- Allene Jeanes, 89, American chemical researcher.
- Arthur Mullard, 85, English actor, comedian and singer.
- Euan Robertson, 47, New Zealand distance runner and Olympian (1976), heart attack.
- Samuel Murray Rosenstein, 86, American judge (United States Court of International Trade).
- Abolhassan Sadighi, 101, Iranian sculptor and painter .
- Robert Shelton, 69, American music and film critic.
- Miko Tripalo, 69, Croatian politician.
- Woody Wheaton, 81, American baseball player (Philadelphia Athletics).

=== 12 ===
- Roberto Agramonte, 91, Cuban ambassador, philosopher, and politician.
- Ike Altgens, 76, American photojournalist, photo editor, and field reporter, carbon monoxide poisoning.
- Evangeline Bruce, 81, American society hostess and writer.
- R. Ramanathan Chettiar, 82, Indian businessman and politician.
- Ángel Crespo, 69, Spanish poet and translator.
- Princess Caroline-Mathilde of Denmark, 83, Danish princess.
- Jack Friel, 97, American college basketball coach (Washington State Cougars).
- Giovanni Giacomazzi, 67, Italian football player.
- Sanusi Hardjadinata, 81, Indonesian politician.
- Oles Honchar, 77, Ukrainian writer and public figure.
- Danny Kelleher, 29, English cricketer.
- Lyudmil Kirkov, 61, Bulgarian film director and actor.
- David Lightbown, 63, British politician.
- Andrew Nelson Lytle, 92, American novelist, dramatist, and essayist.
- David Marshall, 87, Singaporean politician and first Chief Minister, lung cancer.
- Mike Modak, 73, American baseball player (Cincinnati Reds).
- Moshe-Zvi Neria, 82, Israeli Orthodox writer and politician.
- Andrew Olle, 47, Australian radio and television presenter, brain cancer.
- Hugh Stewart, 88, Scottish cricketer.
- Homer Thornberry, 86, American politician and judge.

=== 13 ===
- Gerda Bengtsson, 95, Danish textile artist who specialized in embroidery.
- Chrysanthos Mentis Bostantzoglou, 76–77, Greek political cartoonist, playwright, lyricist and painter.
- Ernie Case, 75, American quarterback for UCLA Bruins football and the Baltimore Colts.
- Ann Nolan Clark, 99, American writer who won the Newbery Medal.
- René Cloërec, 84, French composer and conductor.
- Anatoly Dyatlov, 64, Soviet engineer in charge during the Chernobyl disaster, heart attack.
- Nancy LaMott, 43, American singer, uterine cancer.
- Eloy de Menezes, 85, Brazilian Olympic equestrian (1948, 1952, 1956).

=== 14 ===
- Gustavus Hamilton-Russell, 10th Viscount Boyne, 64, Irish peer, soldier and banker.
- Eddie Clamp, 61, English footballer.
- G. C. Edmondson, 73, American science fiction author .
- Rob Harris, 28, American skysurfer, accident.
- Bob Rogers, 72, American Olympic bobsledder (1964).
- Eduardo Simian, 80, Chilean football player and politician.
- Constance Tipper, 101, English metallurgist and crystallographer.

=== 15 ===
- János Adorján, 57, Hungarian handball player and Olympian (1972).
- Calvin Clarke, 79, American baseball player in the Negro leagues.
- Mano Dayak, 45, Nigerien Tuareg freedom fighter, activist and politician, plane crash.
- Crawford Douglas, 64, Canadian politician, member of the House of Commons of Canada (1974-1979).
- Marion Holley, 85, American track and field athlete and Olympian (1928).
- Dave Holliday, 91, Australian rules footballer.
- Sariamin Ismail, 86, Indonesian novelist.
- Miroslav Katětov, 77, Czech mathematician, chess master, and psychologist.
- Johnny Lytle, 63, American vibraphone player.
- Manuel Gutiérrez Mellado, 83, Spanish politician and minister, traffic collision.
- Diana Poulton, 92, English lutenist.
- Jan Říha, 80, Czech football player.

=== 16 ===
- Albert Alberts, 84, Dutch writer, translator, and journalist.
- Edith Bonlieu, 61, French Olympic alpine skier (1956).
- Giulio Cappelli, 84, Italian footballer and Olympian (1936).
- John A. Field Jr., 85, American judge.
- Simone Genevois, 83, French film actress.
- Shui Hua, 79, Chinese film director and screenwriter.
- Anthony Ingrassia, 51, American director, producer, and playwright.
- Bert Marcelo, 59, Filipino television personality.
- Johnny Moss, 88, American poker player.
- Charles Sauriol, 91, Canadian naturalist.
- Mariele Ventre, 56, Italian musician and singer, breast cancer.

=== 17 ===
- Isa Alptekin, 94, Chinese Uyghur nationalist and pan-Turkic politician.
- Hendrikus Berkhof, 81, Dutch theologian.
- Cliff Blackmon, 81, American baseball player.
- Alfred Bula, 87, Swiss racing cyclist.
- Alfa Castaldi, 68, Italian photographer.
- Arthur Cirilli, 80, American lawyer, politician, and judge.
- George Cox, 91, American baseball player (Chicago White Sox).
- Franklin Taylor Dupree Jr., 82, American district judge (United States District Court for the Eastern District of North Carolina).
- Lawrence Tupper Lydick, 79, American district judge (United States District Court for the Central District of California).
- David Nichol, 81, Scottish cricketer.
- Dorothy B. Porter, 90, American librarian, bibliographer and curator.
- Uwe Schmitt, 34, German track and field athlete and Olympian (1984).
- Olivette Thibault, 81, Canadian actress from Quebec.
- Peter Warlock, 91, British magician.
- Takuma Yasui, 86, Japanese economist.

=== 18 ===
- Panchito Alba, 70, Filipino film actor.
- Brian Brockless, 69, English organist and composer.
- Maurie Fields, 70, Australian vaudeville performer, actor and stand-up comedian.
- Yelena Miroshina, 21, Russian diver and Olympian (1988, 1992), fall.
- António Roquete, 89, Portuguese football goalkeeper and Olympian (1928).
- Nathan Rosen, 86, Israeli physicist.
- Martin Růžek, 77, Czech actor.
- Ross Thomas, 69, American writer of crime fiction, lung cancer.
- Mohammad Yeganeh, 72, Iranian economist.
- Konrad Zuse, 85, German engineer.

=== 19 ===
- Nita Barrow, 79, Governor-General of Barbados, stroke.
- Max Beer, 83, Swiss Olympic long-distance runner (1936).
- Céline Figard, 19, French murder victim, strangulation.
- Linda Hayes, 77, American actress.
- Jack Hively, 85, American film editor and film and television director.
- René Lemoine, 89, French fencer and Olympian (1932, 1936).
- Masako Shinpo, 82, Japanese Olympic javelin thrower (1932).
- Henri Virlogeux, 71, French actor.
- Harold Watkinson, 85, British businessman and politician.

=== 20 ===
- Suzanne Baron, 68, French film editor.
- Alexina Duchamp, 89, American art dealer and wife of Marcel Duchamp.
- John Jacques, Baron Jacques, 90, British businessman and politician.
- Eggy Ley, 67, British jazz musician, heart attack.
- Allan Mackintosh, 59, Danish physicist.
- Mario Procaccino, 83, Italian-American lawyer and politician.
- Maan Sassen, 84, Dutch politician.
- Madge Sinclair, 57, Jamaican-American actress (Trapper John, M.D., Coming to America, The Lion King), Emmy winner (1991), leukemia.
- Notable people killed in American Airlines Flight 965:
  - Paris Kanellakis, 42, Greek American computer scientist.
  - Benny Ramírez, 63, Colombian professional wrestler.

=== 21 ===
- Trenchard Cox, 90, British museum director.
- Sammy Creason, 51, American session drummer, brain aneurism.
- R. F. V. Heuston, 72, British professor of law.
- Adalbert Iordache, 76, Romanian Olympic water polo player (1952).
- Roddy Lamb, 96, American gridiron football player (Chicago Cardinals).
- Boris Ponomarev, 90, Soviet politician, ideologist, and historian.

=== 22 ===
- Max Alwin, 56, Dutch Olympic rower (1964).
- Jean Aubry, 82, French Olympic gymnast (1936).
- Lawrence Berk, 87, American composer, pianist, and music educator.
- Ted Carroll, 56, Irish hurler.
- Pierre Cour, 79, French songwriter and lyricist.
- Ferris Jennings, 82, American gridiron football player.
- Takuzo Kawatani, 54, Japanese film actor, lung cancer.
- Osvald Käpp, 90, Estonian wrestler and Olympian (1924, 1928, 1932).
- David Land, 77, British impresario and theatre producer.
- Basil Malcolm, 83, English cricketer.
- Butterfly McQueen, 84, American actress (Gone with the Wind, The Mosquito Coast, Duel in the Sun).
- James Meade, 88, English economist.
- Tom Pettit, 64, American journalist.

=== 23 ===
- Helen Andersen, 76, Canadian artist, cancer.
- Attilio Bulgheri, 82, Italian football player.
- Ralph H. Demmler, 91, American lawyer.
- René Jutras, 82, Canadian politician, member of the House of Commons of Canada (1940-1957).
- Gabrielle Keiller, 87, Scottish socialite, golfer, art collector and archaeological photographer.
- Karl Jamshed Khandalavala, 91, Indian Air Force officer, Parsi art connoisseur, and lawyer.
- Patric Knowles, 84, English actor, cerebral hemorrhage.
- Olof Rydbeck, 82, Swedish diplomat.
- John Shaw, 58, Australian Olympic sailor (1972).

=== 24 ===
- Phillip E. Areeda, 65, American lawyer and legal scholar, leukemia.
- Aharon Becker, 90, Israeli politician.
- Lojze Krakar, 69, Slovene poet, literary historian, and essayist.
- Carlos Lapetra, 57, Spanish football player.
- Geoffrey Pinnington, 76, British journalist.
- Jo Schouwenaar-Franssen, 86, Dutch politician .
- Jack Siggins, 86, Irish rugby player.

=== 25 ===
- Frederick Becton, 87, United States Navy officer and destroyer commander during World War II.
- James Boucher, 85, Irish cricketer.
- Chang Kee-ryo, 84, South Korean surgeon, educator, and philanthropist.
- Akira Kono, 66, Japanese Olympic gymnast (1956).
- Emmanuel Levinas, 89, French-Lithuanian philosopher.
- Marijan Lipovšek, 85, Slovenian pianist, composer and writer on music.
- Dean Martin, 78, American singer ("Ain't That a Kick in the Head?", "That's Amore"), comedian and actor (The Dean Martin Show), pulmonary emphysema.
- Henri Patrelle, 77, French football player and executive.
- Allen Russell Patrick, 85, Canadian politician .
- Víctor Peralta, 87, Argentine Olympic boxer (1928).
- Nicolas Slonimsky, 101, Russian-American musicologist.

=== 26 ===
- Hüsamettin Böke, 85, Turkish footballer and referee.
- Al DeRogatis, 68, American gridiron football player (New York Giants), cancer.
- Dudar Hahanov, 74, Soviet composer, violinist and conductor.
- Walter Horn, 87, German-American medievalist scholar.
- Ángel Sauce, 84, Venezuelan composer, conductor and teacher.
- Bob Veselic, 40, American professional baseball player (Minnesota Twins).

=== 27 ===
- Ferdinand Auth, 81, German politician.
- Al Barlick, 80, American umpire in Major League Baseball.
- Jeremy John Beadle, 39, British critic, writer and broadcaster, AIDS-related complications.
- Edgar Bischoff, 83, Romanian-French composer and lyricist.
- Henk Bouwman, 69, Dutch Olympic field hockey player (1948).
- Lois Bulley, 94, British county councillor, philanthropist and political activist.
- Thomas C. Chalmers, 78, American physician and medical researcher.
- Shura Cherkassky, 86, Ukrainian-American concert pianist.
- William Campbell Gault, 85, American writer.
- Boris Gnedenko, 83, Soviet/Ukrainian mathematician.
- Winslow Hall, 83, American Olympic rower (1932).
- Syd Herlong, 86, American politician, member of the United States House of Representatives (1949-1969).
- Oscar Judd, 87, Canadian-American baseball player (Boston Red Sox, Philadelphia Phillies).
- Genrikh Kasparyan, 85, Soviet chess player.
- Enzo Serafin, 83, Italian cinematographer.

=== 28 ===
- Hipolito Arenas, 88, American baseball player.
- Madeleine Barot, 86, French activist and theologian.
- Virginius Dabney, 94, American teacher, journalist, and writer.
- Maxwell Street Jimmy Davis, 70, American electric blues musician, heart attack.
- Walther Killy, 78, German literary scholar.
- Michel Michelet, 101, Ukrainian composer of film scores.
- Howard C. Petersen, 85, American government official and banker.
- Jim Robinson, 49, American racing driver.
- Massimo Rosi, 51, Italian Olympic swimmer (1960).
- Bill Sharpe, 63, American triple jumper and Olympian (1956, 1960, 1964).

=== 29 ===
- Shirley Ascott, 65, British Olympic sprint canoer (1952).
- Gordon Cameron, 73, Australian rules footballer.
- Nello Celio, 81, President of Switzerland.
- Harold Collison, 86, British trade unionist.
- Harry Cripps, 54, English football player.
- Lita Grey, 87, American actress, cancer.
- Hans Henkemans, 82, Dutch pianist, teacher, composer of classical music and psychiatrist.
- Philippus Jacobus Idenburg, 94, Dutch statistician.
- Johan Manusama, 85, Dutch Schoolteacher and Moluccan independence activist.
- Hazel Sanders, 69, English cricketer.

=== 30 ===
- Poul Andersen, 65, Danish footballer and Olympian (1960).
- Hubert Clompe, 85, Romanian Olympic ski jumper (1936).
- Ralph Flanagan, 81, American big band leader, pianist, composer, and arranger.
- Doris Grau, 71, American script supervisor and voice actress (The Simpsons, The Critic, DuckTales), lung disease.
- Richard Hornung, 45, American costume designer (Barton Fink, Miller's Crossing, Young Guns), AIDS.
- Aleksandre Machavariani, 82, Georgian composer and conductor.
- Heiner Müller, 66, German poet and playwright, laryngeal cancer.
- Suzanne Prou, 75, French novelist.
- Nestor Redondo, 67, Filipino comics artist.
- Katarina Taikon, 63, Swedish civil rights activist, writer and actor.

=== 31 ===
- David Anderson, 79, Scottish judge, politician and Solicitor General for Scotland.
- Francis Woodman Cleaves, 84, American sinologist, linguist, and historian.
- Gabriel d'Aubarède, 97, French novelist, literary critic and journalist.
- Fritz Eckhardt, 88, Austrian actor, director, and writer.
- Daniel O. Graham, 70, American Army officer.
- Ak'ak'i Meipariani, 77, Soviet Georgian Olympic fencer (1952).
- Eduardo Hernández Moncada, 96, Mexican composer and conductor.
- Bill Nyrop, 43, American ice hockey player (Montreal Canadiens, Minnesota North Stars), colon cancer.
- Elisabeth Pinajeff, 95, Russian-German actress.
