= Athletics at the 1936 Summer Olympics – Men's marathon =

Men's marathon at the Games of the XI Olympiad
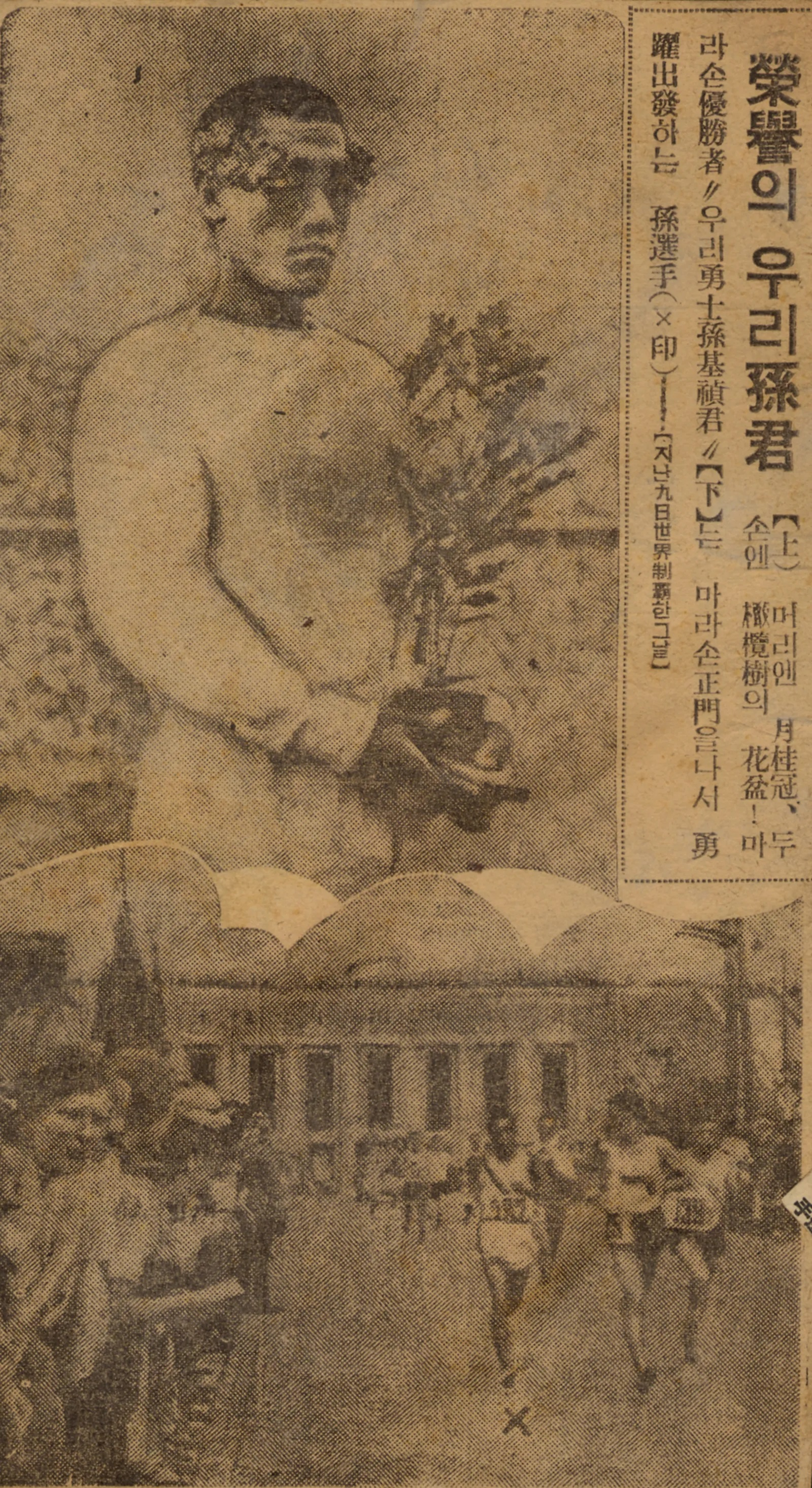
- The Dong-a Ilbo ran this picture of Sohn at the victory ceremony with the Japanese rising sun on his uniform obscured, leading to repercussions from the Japanese government
- Venue: Start and finish at Olympiastadion
- Dates: August 9, 1936
- Competitors: 56 from 27 nations
- Winning time: 2:29:19.2

Medalists
1st place, gold medalist(s)		Kitei Son; Japan
2nd place, silver medalist(s)		Ernest Harper; Great Britain
3rd place, bronze medalist(s)		Shōryū Nan; Japan

The men's marathon event at the 1936 Summer Olympic Games took place August 9. Fifty-six athletes from 27 nations competed. The maximum number of athletes per nation had been set at 3 since the 1930 Olympic Congress. The race was won by Sohn Kee-chung, a Korean athlete competing for Japan as the country was under Japanese occupation; Sohn refused to acknowledge the Japanese anthem at the victory ceremony. Sohn was the first Korean athlete to win an Olympic gold medal, though the medal remains credited as Japan's first victory in the Olympic marathon. Finland (barely) missed the marathon podium for the first time since World War I, with its top two runners placing 4th and 5th.

== Korean athletes ==
During the time of the competition, Korea was a colony of Japan, therefore Korean sportsmen competed as members of Japanese team and were using their Japanese names. The Korean names of Son Kitei and Nan Shōryū are Sohn Kee-chung and Nam Sung-yong respectively. After Sohn's victory, he bowed his head during the Japanese anthem at his medal ceremony and remarked that he was ashamed to compete for Japan, an occupying power, rather than an independent Korea. A Korean newspaper, The Dong-a Ilbo, obscured the Japanese rising sun symbol on Sohn's uniform in a photograph of the victory ceremony, resulting in the Japanese government suspending the newspaper and jailing some of its employees.

== Background ==
This was the tenth appearance of the event, which is one of 12 athletics events to have been held at every Summer Olympics. Returning runners from 1932 included the defending champion, Juan Carlos Zabala of Argentina, and tenth-place finisher Anders Hartington Andersen of Denmark. Sohn Kee-chung had broken the world record in 1935, won 9 of the 12 marathons he had run since 1933, and finished in the top three in the other 3.

Bulgaria, the Republic of China, Peru, Poland, and Switzerland each made their first appearance in Olympic marathons. The United States made its tenth appearance, the only nation to have competed in each Olympic marathon to that point.

== Competition format and course ==
As all Olympic marathons, the competition was a single race. The now-standard marathon distance of 26 miles, 385 yards was run over a course that started in the Olympic Stadium. After going around the stadium, the starting field left the stadium through the Marathon Gate. The runners crossed the Maifeld and then turned right into the Angerburger Avenue. Shortly thereafter, it was then left into Glockenturmstraße and the first checkpoint after 4 km on the Havelchaussee. They went on the banks of the Havel along the Grunewald to the left side. The second checkpoint was 6 kilometers on Rupenhorn, at kilometer 8 of the third control point followed on Schildhorn. The Grunewaldturm was reached after 10 km, at the level of the island Lindwerder sending the runners southeast. At the end of Havelchaussee runners then turned left on the long, straight AVUS. The course went on the race track to the Nordschleife, there returned to the rotor field and the previous route ran back to the Olympic Stadium. The athletes came through the Marathon Gate back to the stadium and then ran for about 150 meters to the finish line.

This route differs from the present-day Berlin Marathon.

== Records ==
These were the standing world and Olympic records prior to the 1936 Summer Olympics per the IAAF. The ARRS lists Sohn as having run 2:26:14 on 21 March 1935.

World record	Kitei Son (JPN)	2:26:42	Tokyo, Japan	3 November 1935
Olympic record	Juan Carlos Zabala (ARG)	2:31:36	Los Angeles, United States	7 August 1932

Sohn Kee-chung set a new Olympic best with a time of 2:29:19.2.

== Schedule ==
The day was "dry and clear" and 22 °C (72 °F).

Date	Time	Round
Sunday, 9 August 1936	15:00	Final

== Results ==
Rank	Athlete	Nation	Time	Notes
1st place, gold medalist(s)	Kitei Son	Japan	2:29:19.2	OR
2nd place, silver medalist(s)	Ernest Harper	Great Britain	2:31:23.2	
3rd place, bronze medalist(s)	Shōryū Nan	Japan	2:31:42.0	
4	Erkki Tamila	Finland	2:32:45.0	
5	Väinö Muinonen	Finland	2:33:46.0	
6	Johannes Coleman	South Africa	2:36:17.0	
7	Donald Robertson	Great Britain	2:37:06.2	
8	Jackie Gibson	South Africa	2:38:04.0	
9	Mauno Tarkiainen	Finland	2:39:33.0	
10	Thore Enochsson	Sweden	2:43:12.0	
11	Stylianos Kyriakides	Greece	2:43:20.0	
12	Nouba Khaled	France	2:45:34.0	
13	Henry Palmé	Sweden	2:46:08.4	
14	Franz Tuschek	Austria	2:46:29.0	
15	Jimmy Bartlett	Canada	2:48:21.4	
16	Émile Duval	France	2:48:39.8	
17	Manuel Dias	Portugal	2:49:00.0	
18	Johnny Kelley	United States	2:49:32.4	
19	Miloslav Luňák	Czechoslovakia	2:50:26.0	
20	Felix Meskens	Belgium	2:51:19.0	
21	Ján Takáč	Czechoslovakia	2:51:20.0	
22	Rudolf Wöber	Austria	2:51:28.0	
23	Ludovic Gall	Romania	2:55:02.0	
24	Robert Nevens	Belgium	2:55:51.0	
25	Anders Hartington Andersen	Denmark	2:56:31.0	
26	Gabriel Mendoza	Peru	2:57:17.8	
27	Tommy Lalande	South Africa	2:57:20.0	
28	Artūrs Motmillers	Latvia	2:58:02.0	
29	Eduard Braesecke	Germany	2:59:33.4	
30	Percy Wyer	Canada	3:00:11.0	
31	Fernand Le Heurteur	France	3:01:11.0	
32	Wilhelm Rothmayer	Austria	3:02:32.0	
33	Bronisław Gancarz	Poland	3:03:11.0	
34	Max Beer	Switzerland	3:06:26.0	
35	Guillermo Suárez	Peru	3:08:18.0	
36	Boris Kharalampiev	Bulgaria	3:08:53.8	
37	Arul Swami	India	3:10:44.0	
38	Josef Šulc	Czechoslovakia	3:11:47.4	
39	Franz Eha	Switzerland	3:18:17.0	
40	Wang Zhenglin	Republic of China	3:25:36.4	
41	Stane Šporn	Yugoslavia	3:30:47.0	
42	José Farías	Peru	3:33:24.0	
—	Juan Acosta	Chile	DNF	
—	Franz Barsicke	Germany	DNF	
—	Ellison Brown	United States	DNF	
—	Giannino Bulzone	Italy	DNF	
—	Paul de Bruyn	Germany	DNF	
—	Kazimierz Fiałka	Poland	DNF	
—	Aurelio Genghini	Italy	DNF	
—	Billy McMahon	United States	DNF	
—	Jaime Mendes	Portugal	DNF	
—	Bert Norris	Great Britain	DNF	
—	Luis Oliva	Argentina	DNF	
—	Tamao Shiwaku	Japan	DNF	
—	Harold Webster	Canada	DNF	
—	Juan Carlos Zabala	Argentina	DNF	
—	Vincent Callard	Canada	DNS	
—	Jean Chapelle	Belgium	DNS	
—	Ernst Hirt	Switzerland	DNS	
—	Jorge Perry	Colombia	DNS	
