= Canoeing at the 1960 Summer Olympics – Women's K-1 500 metres =

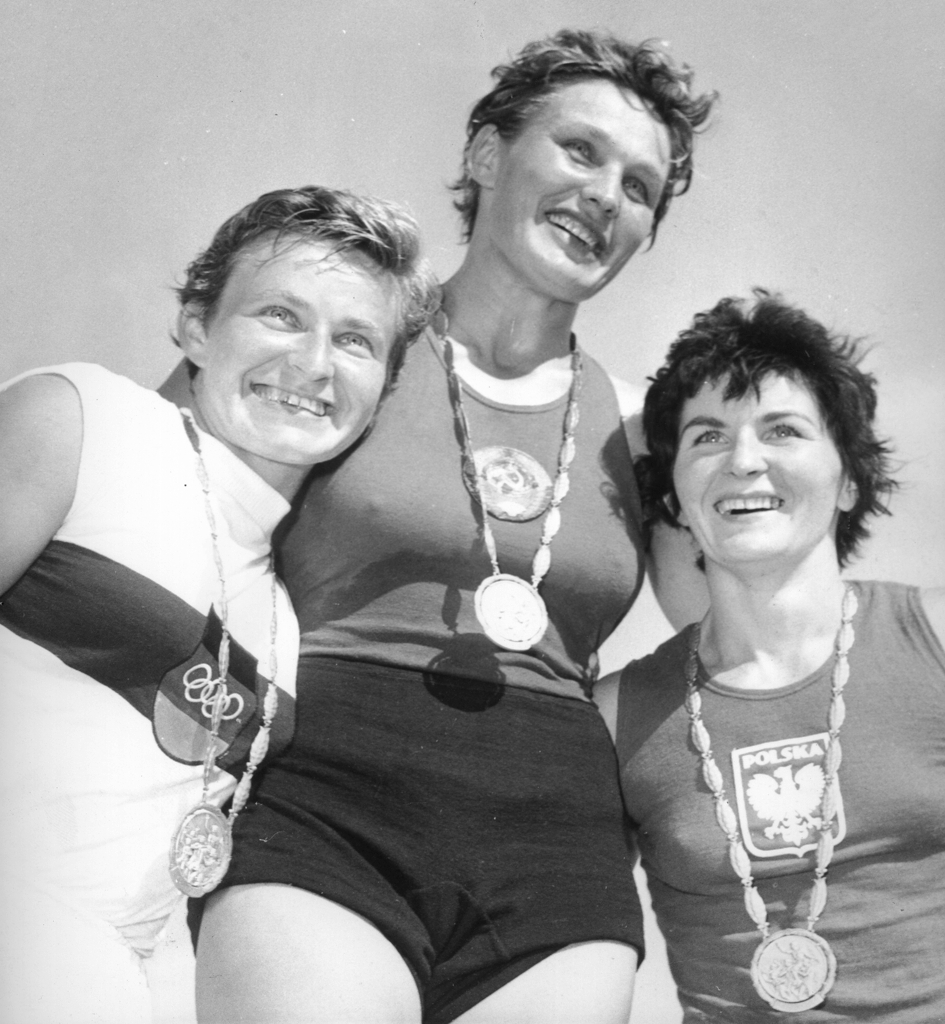
Left-right: Therese Zenz, Antonina Seredina, Daniela Walkowiak

The women's K-1 500 metres event was an individual kayaking event conducted as part of the Canoeing at the 1960 Summer Olympics program on Lake Albano.

== Medalists ==
Gold	Silver	Bronze
Antonina Seredina (URS)	Therese Zenz (EUA)	Daniela Walkowiak (POL)

== Results ==
=== Heats ===
15 competitors entered, but only 13 competed. They first raced in two heats on August 26. The top three finishers from each of the heats advanced directly to the semifinal on the 27th while the rest competed in the repechages the 26th.

Heat 1
1.	Daniela Walkowiak (POL)	2:15.34	QS
2.	Alberta Zanardi (ITA)	2:17.14	QS
3.	Klára Fried-Bánfalvi (HUN)	2:17.39	QS
4.	Marianne Tucker (GBR)	2:21.06	QR
5.	Gabrielle Lutz (FRA)	2:22.05	QR
6.	Eila Kyröläinen (FIN)	2:22.33	QR
-	Helga Wiedermann (AUT)	Did not start
Heat 2
1.	Antonina Seredina (URS)	2:08.82	QS
2.	Therese Zenz (EUA)	2:09.73	QS
3.	Else-Marie Lindmark (SWE)	2:13.37	QS
4.	Annemarie Werner-Hansen (DEN)	2:14.04	QR
5.	Eva Kutová (TCH)	2:16.35	QR
6.	Heidi Sager (AUS)	2:19.75	QR
7.	Glorianne Perrier (USA)	2:23.00	QR
-	E. Dumitrasku (ROU)	Did not start

=== Repechages ===
The seven competitors raced in two repechages on August 26. The top three finishers from each of the repechages advanced directly to the semifinal on the following day.

Repechage 1
1.	Eva Kutová (TCH)	2:17.87	QS
2.	Eila Kyröläinen (FIN)	2:18.54	QS
3.	Marianne Tucker (GBR)	2:21.04	QS
4.	Glorianne Perrier (USA)	2:21.20
Repechage 2
1.	Annemarie Werner-Hansen (DEN)	2:13.76	QS
2.	Heidi Sager (AUS)	2:15.27	QS
3.	Gabrielle Lutz (FRA)	2:19.28	QS

=== Semifinal ===
The top three finishers in the semifinal (raced on August 27) advanced to the final.

Semifinal 1
1.	Daniela Walkowiak (POL)	2:11.07	QF
2.	Else-Marie Lindmark (SWE)	2:13.19	QF
3.	Annemarie Werner-Hansen (DEN)	2:17.87	QF
4.	Marianne Tucker (GBR)	2:18.96
Semifinal 2
1.	Antonina Seredina (URS)	2:07.20	QF
2.	Klára Fried-Bánfalvi (HUN)	2:15.51	QF
3.	Eila Kyröläinen (FIN)	2:17.28	QF
4.	Heidi Sager (AUS)	2:18.42
Semifinal 3
1.	Therese Zenz (EUA)	2:08.51	QF
2.	Alberta Zanardi (ITA)	2:15.58	QF
3.	Eva Kutová (TCH)	2:16.90	QF
4.	Gabrielle Lutz (FRA)	2:22.51

=== Final ===
The final was held on August 29.

Gold	Antonina Seredina (URS)	2:08.08
Silver	Therese Zenz (EUA)	2:08.22
Bronze	Daniela Walkowiak (POL)	2:10.46
4.	Annemarie Werner-Hansen (DEN)	2:13.88
5.	Klára Fried-Bánfalvi (HUN)	2:14.02
6.	Else-Marie Lindmark (SWE)	2:14.17
7.	Alberta Zanardi (ITA)	2:14.31
8.	Eva Kutová (TCH)	2:15.30
9.	Eila Kyröläinen (FIN)	2:17.28
