= Canoeing at the 1956 Summer Olympics – Women's K-1 500 metres =

The women's K-1 500 metres was a competition in canoeing at the 1956 Summer Olympics. The K-1 event is raced by single-person canoe sprint kayaks. Heat and finals took place on December 1.

== Medalists ==
Gold	Silver	Bronze
Yelizaveta Dementyeva (URS)	Therese Zenz (EUA)	Tove Søby (DEN)

== Heats ==
The ten competitors first raced in three heats. The top four finishers in each heat moved directly to the final.

Heat 1
1.	Therese Zenz (EUA)	2:17.6	QF
2.	Yelizaveta Dementyeva (URS)	2:20.9	QF
3.	Edith Cochrane (AUS)	2:24.0	QF
4.	Patricia Moody (GBR)	2:26.7	QF
5.	Helga Hellebrand (AUT)	2:27.5
Heat 2
1.	Tove Søby (DEN)	2:23.7	QF
2.	Cecilia Berkes (HUN)	2:25.3	QF
3.	Daniela Walkowiak (POL)	2:25.8	QF
4.	Eva Marion (FRA)	2:29.4	QF
5.	Eila Eskola (FIN)	2:31.4

== Final ==
Gold	Yelizaveta Dementyeva (URS)	2:18.9
Silver	Therese Zenz (EUA)	2:19.6
Bronze	Tove Søby (DEN)	2:22.3
4.	Cecilia Berkes (HUN)	2:23.5
5.	Edith Cochrane (AUS)	2:23.8
6.	Daniela Walkowiak (POL)	2:24.1
7.	Patricia Moody (GBR)	2:25.3
8.	Eva Marion (FRA)	2:27.9

Dementyeva false-started once, then won the event by two meters after spurting to the lead after the start. Fifth-place finisher Cochrane never trained with or competed against women prior to the Olympics.
