= Canoeing at the 1960 Summer Olympics – Women's K-2 500 metres =

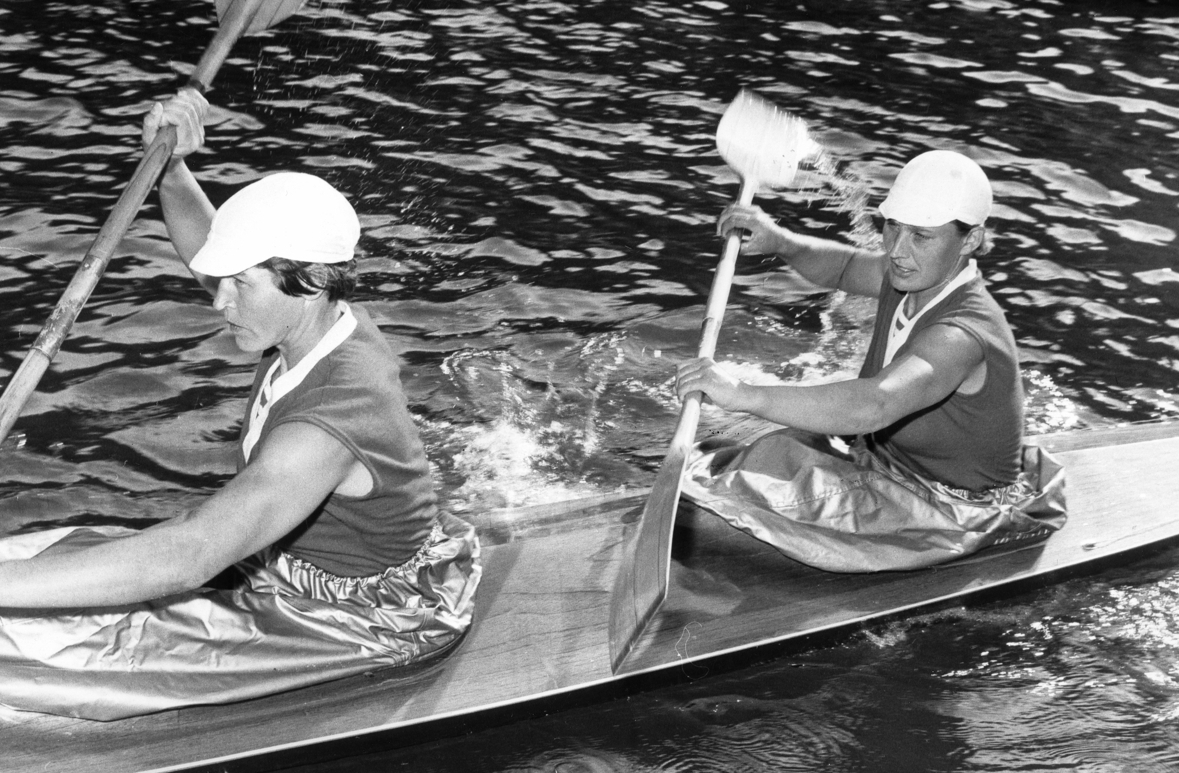
Mariya Shubina and Antonina Seredina at the Olympics

The women's K-2 500 metres event was a pairs kayaking event conducted as part of the Canoeing at the 1960 Summer Olympics program on Lake Albano. This event debuted at these Olympics though it is one of two events that has been at every ICF Canoe Sprint World Championships (the other is the men's K-4 1000 m event which debuted at the 1964 Games in Tokyo and ran until the 2016 Games in Rio de Janeiro.

== Medalists ==
Gold	Silver	Bronze
Mariya Shubina and Antonina Seredina (URS)	Therese Zenz and Ingrid Hartmann (EUA)	Klára Fried-Bánfalvi and Vilma Egresi (HUN)

== Results ==
=== Heats ===
The 11 crews first raced in two heats on August 26. The top three finishers from each of the heats advanced directly to the final; the remaining five teams were relegated to the repechage.

Heat 1
1.	Mariya Shubina and Antonina Seredina (URS)	1:55.93	QF
2.	Therese Zenz and Ingrid Hartmann (EUA)	1:59.01	QF
3.	Klára Fried-Bánfalvi and Vilma Egresi (HUN)	2:01.86	QF
4.	Gabriella Cotta Ramusino and Luciana Guindani (ITA)	2:05.40	QR
5.	Helga Hellebrand-Wiedermann and Lisa Schindler (AUT)	2:06.30	QR
6.	Heidi Sager and Cynthia Nicholas (AUS)	2:12.20	QR
Heat 2
1.	Daniela Walkowiak-Pilecka and Janina Mendalska (POL)	2:01.03	QF
2.	Annemarie Werner-Hansen and Birgit Jensen (DEN)	2:03.98	QF
3.	Eva Kutová and Eva Kolinská (TCH)	2:04.22	QF
4.	Maria Szkeli and Elena Lipalit (ROU)	2:04.32	QR
5.	Mary Ann DuChai and Diane Jerome (USA)	2:15.51	QR

=== Repechage ===
The top three finishers in the repechage (raced on August 27) advanced to the final.

Repechage
1.	Gabriella Cotta Ramusino and Luciana Guindani (ITA)	2:08.85	QF
2.	Helga Hellebrand-Wiedermann and Lisa Schindler (AUT)	2:10.00	QF
3.	Maria Szkeli and Elena Lipalit (ROU)	2:10.17	QF
4.	Heidi Sager and Cynthia Nicholas (AUS)	2:14.11
5.	Mary Ann DuChai and Diane Jerome (USA)	2:21.13

=== Final ===
The final was held on August 29.

Gold	Mariya Shubina and Antonina Seredina (URS)	1:54.76
Silver	Therese Zenz and Ingrid Hartmann (EUA)	1:56.66
Bronze	Klára Fried-Bánfalvi and Vilma Egresi (HUN)	1:58.22
4.	Daniela Walkowiak-Pilecka and Janina Mendalska (POL)	1:59.03
5.	Annemarie Werner-Hansen and Birgit Jensen (DEN)	2:01.36
6.	Maria Szkeli and Elena Lipalit (ROU)	2:01.68
7.	Gabriella Cotta Ramusino and Luciana Guindani (ITA)	2:02.47
8.	Eva Kutová and Eva Kolinská (TCH)	2:02.76
9.	Helga Hellebrand-Wiedermann and Lisa Schindler (AUT)	2:02.85
