= Tove Søby =

Danish canoeist

Medal record

Women's canoe sprint

Representing Denmark

World Championships
Bronze medal – third place	1954 Mâcon	K-1 500 m

Olympic Games
Bronze medal – third place	1956 Melbourne	K-1 500 m

Tove Goltermann Søby (née Nielsen, born 23 January 1933) is a Danish sprint canoeist who competed in the 1950s.

She won a silver medal in the K-1 500 m event at the 1954 ICF Canoe Sprint World Championships in Mâcon.

She won a bronze medal in the K-1 500 m event at the 1956 Summer Olympics in Melbourne behind Yelizaveta Dementyeva from the Soviet Union and Therese Zenz from Germany. Shortly afterwards she retired.
