= Haralampiev =

Haralampiev or Kharalampiev (Bulgarian: Харалампиев) is a surname. Notable people with the surname include:

- Boris Kharalampiev (1908 – ?), Bulgarian long-distance runner
- Georgi Haralampiev (born 1942), Bulgarian footballer
- Ivan Haralampiev (1946–2025), Bulgarian linguist
