= Mauno =

Mauno is a Finnish and Estonian masculine given name. Notable people with the name include:

- Mauno Castrén (1931–2021), Finnish diplomat
- Mauno Forsman (1928–2006), Finnish politician (Social Democrat), Member of Parliament 1971–1983
- Mauno Hartman (1930–2017), Finnish sculptor
- Mauno Järvelä (born 1949), Finnish fiddler, violinist and music pedagogue
- Mauno Jokipii (1924–2007), Finnish professor of history at the University of Jyväskylä specializing in World War II
- Mauno Jussila (1908–1988), Finnish farmer and politician
- Mauno Kling, second governor of the 17th century colony of New Sweden administrated from Fort Christina, now Wilmington, Delaware
- Mauno Koivisto GOIH (1923–2017), Finnish politician who served as the ninth President of Finland from 1982 to 1994
- Mauno Kurppa (1927–1999), Finnish farmer, business executive and politician
- Mauno Kuusisto (1917–2010), Finnish vocalist, opera singer (tenor) and actor
- Mauno Maisala (1933–2009), Finnish rower
- Mauno Mäkelä (1916–1987), Finnish film producer
- Mauno Manninen (1915–1969), Finnish poet, painter and theatre director
- Mauno Meesit (born 1983), Estonian musician, composer, record producer, and visual artist
- Mauno Nurmi (1936–2018), Finnish footballer and ice hockey player
- Mauno Pekkala (1890–1952), Finnish politician and Prime Minister from 1946 to 1948
- Mauno Tarkiainen (1904–1971), Finnish long-distance runner
- Mauno Uusivirta (born 1948), Finnish racing cyclist
- Mauno Valkeinen (1930–2015), Finnish swimmer
- Mauno Wilkkinen (1910–1995), Finnish world traveller

== See also ==
- Mano (disambiguation)
- Maun (disambiguation)
- Maunoury
