= Athletics at the 1938 British Empire Games – Men's marathon =

Men's marathon at the Commonwealth Games

The men's marathon event at the 1938 British Empire Games was held on 7 February in Sydney, Australia with the start and finish at the Sydney Cricket Ground.

The winning margin was 7 minutes 42 seconds which as of 2024 remains the only time the men's marathon has been won by more than 5 minutes at these games.

== Results ==
Rank	Name	Nationality	Time	Notes
1st place, gold medalist(s)	Johannes Coleman	South Africa	2:30:49	GR
2nd place, silver medalist(s)	Bert Norris	England	2:37:57	
3rd place, bronze medalist(s)	Jackie Gibson	South Africa	2:38:20	
4	Donald Robertson	Scotland	2:42:40	
5	Jimmy Bartlett	Canada	2:50:41	
6	Lloyd Longman	Canada	2:54.54	
7	Walter Young	Canada	2:59:05	
8	Dick Crossley	Australia	3:12:50	
9	John Wood	Australia	3:19:47	
	Alfred Hayes	Australia	DNF	
	James Patterson	Australia	DNF	
	William Liddle	Australia	DNF	
	Ernest Jolly	Australia	DNF	
	Noel Stanford	Trinidad and Tobago	DNF	
	Scotty Rankine	Canada	DNS	

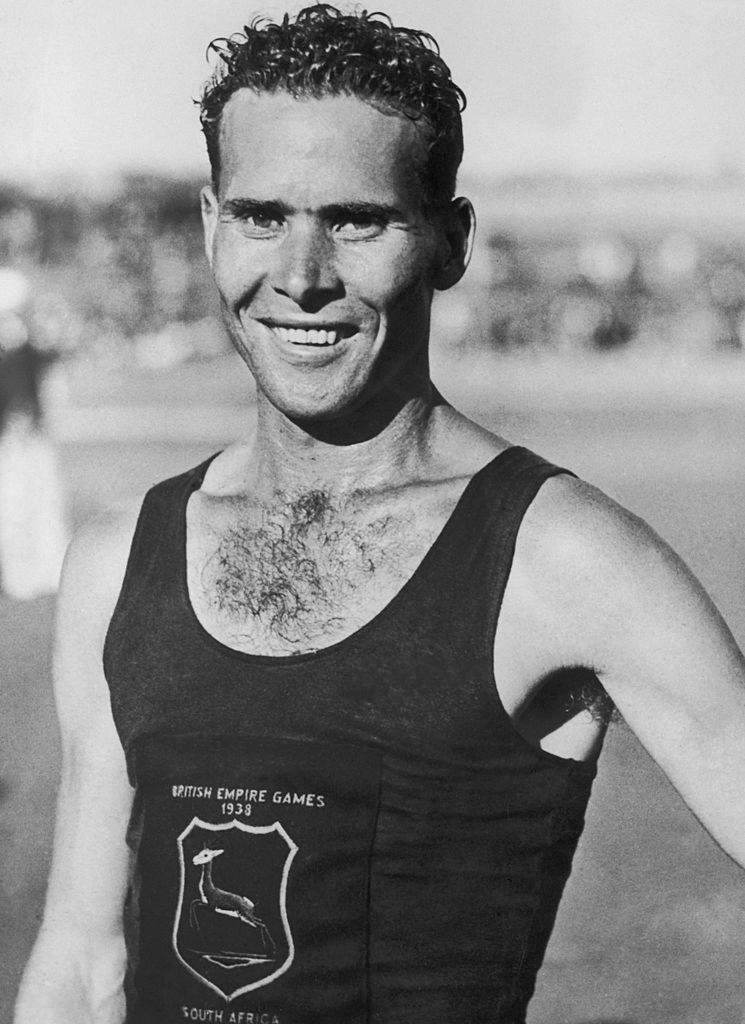
The gold medal winner Johannes Coleman
