= Cynthia Nicholas =

Cynthia Nicholas may refer to:

- Cindy Nicholas (1957–2016), Canadian swimmer and politician
- Cynthia Nicholas (canoeist) (born 1937), Australian canoer
