= Muinonen =

Muinonen is a Finnish surname. Notable people with the surname include:

- Väinö Muinonen (1898–1978), Finnish long-distance runner
- Eetu Muinonen (born 1986), Finnish footballer

== See also ==
- 4665 Muinonen, a main-belt asteroid
