= Zanardi =

Zanardi could refer to:

- Zanardi (surname), Italian surname
- Zanardi (comics), comics character
- Via Zanardi 33, Italian television series
