= Nina Savina =

Nina Savina may refer to:

- Nina Savina (canoeist) (1915–1965), Soviet sprint canoer
- Nina Savina (runner) (born 1993), Belarusian distance runner
