= Kroutil =

Kroutil (feminine: Kroutilová) is a Czech surname. Notable people with the surname include:

- Marta Kroutilová (1925–2017), Czechoslovak sprint canoeist
- Ota Kroutil (1921–1997), Czech sprint canoer
- Petr Kroutil (born 1973), Czech musician and actor
