= 1938 European Athletics Championships – Men's marathon =

Men's marathon at the European Athletics Championships

The men's marathon at the 1938 European Athletics Championships was held in Paris, France, on 4 September 1938.

== Medalists ==
Gold	Väinö Muinonen; Finland
Silver	Squire Yarrow; Great Britain
Bronze	Henry Palme; Sweden

== Results ==
=== Final ===
4 September

Rank	Name	Nationality	Time	Notes
1st place, gold medalist(s)	Väinö Muinonen	Finland	2:37:28.8	CR
2nd place, silver medalist(s)	Squire Yarrow	Great Britain	2:39:03.0	
3rd place, bronze medalist(s)	Henry Palme	Sweden	2:42:13.6	
4	Maurice Waltispurger	France	2:44:28.0	
5	Erich Puch	Germany	2:45:08.8	
6	Eugen Bertsch	Germany	2:45:21.0	
7	Desire Leriche	France	2:48:21.6	
8	Umberto De Florentis	Italy	2:49:29.6	
9	Giovanni Balbusse	Italy	2:50:40.4	
10	Felix Meskens	Belgium	2:51:15.0	
11	Ernst Meier	Switzerland	2:54:28.0	
12	József Mucsi	Hungary	3:03:14.6	
13	Francis O'Sullivan	Great Britain	3:05:06.4	
14	Jean Mutti	Switzerland	3:07:25.4	
	Robert Nevens	Belgium	DNF	

== Participation ==
According to an unofficial count, 15 athletes from 9 countries participated in the event.

- Belgium (2)
- Finland (1)
- France (2)
- Germany (2)
- Hungary (1)
- Italy (2)
- Sweden (1)
- Switzerland (2)
- Great Britain (2)
