= Mariana Vassileva =

Bulgarian artist

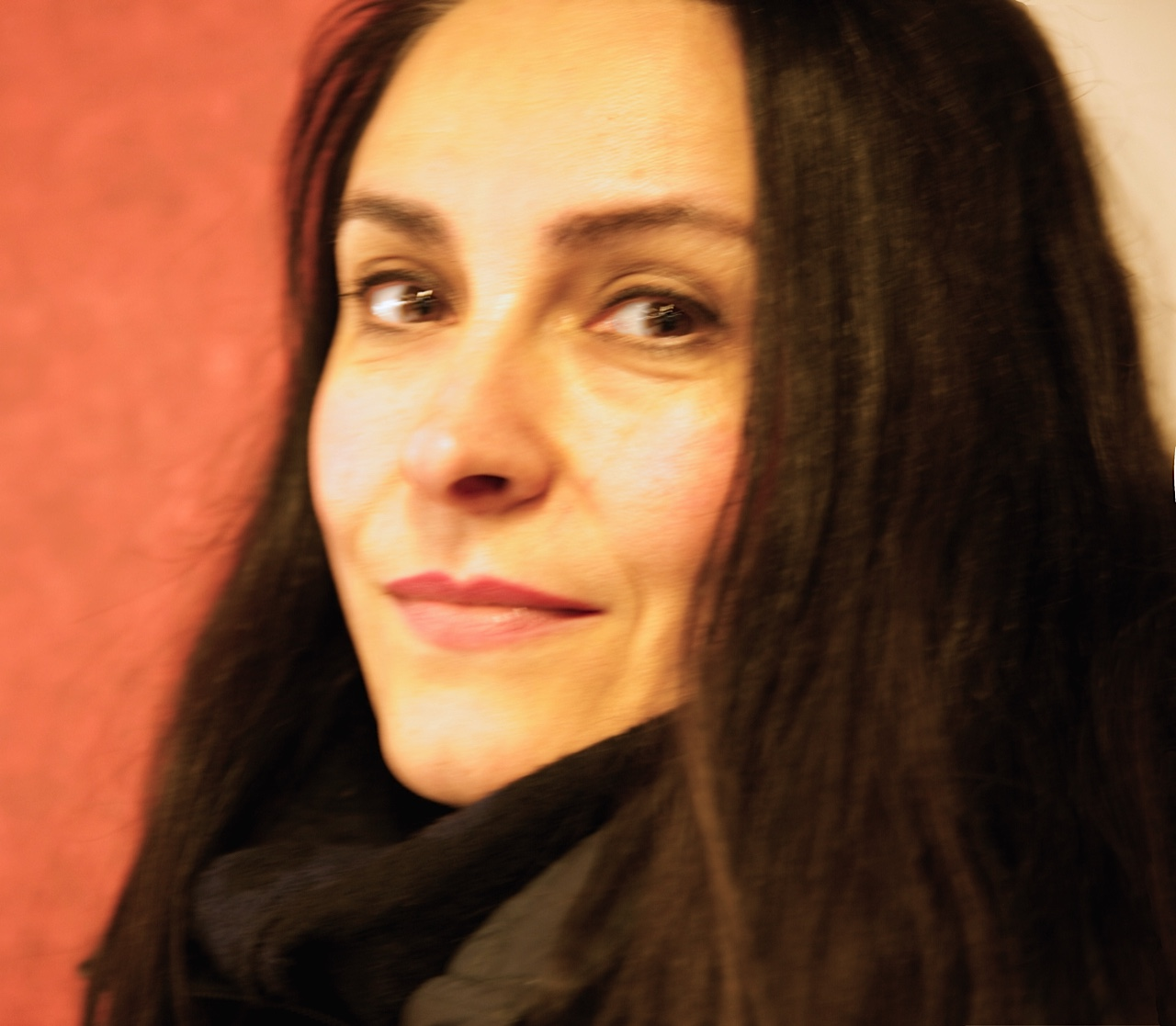
Mariana Vassileva in 2014.

Mariana Vassileva (Bulgarian: Марияна Василева) is a Bulgarian born (born 1964) visual artist living and working in Germany. Her works covers the fields of photography, drawing, sculpture and video.

== Biography ==
Mariana Vassileva was born in 1964 in Antonovo. She studied pedagogy at Veliko Tarnovo University and art at the Hochschule der Künste Berlin. Mariana Vassileva currently lives and works in Berlin.

=== Public collections ===
- Kunsthalle Emden
- Kunstmuseum Wolfsburg
- La Colección de Arte Contemporáneo del Ayuntamiento de Pamplona
- Museum for Contemporary Art Scopje
- Sofia City Art Gallery
- The Israel Museum, Jerusalem

== Bibliography ==
- Mariana Vassileva, Solo video 2000-2012, Casal Solleric, Febrer-April 2012, ISBN 978-84-95267-55-9
- Komm und sieh, Sammlung von Kelterborn, HatjeCantz, ISBN 978-3-7757-3941-2
- Garten Eden: Die Gärten in der Kunst seit 1900, DuMont 2007, ISBN 9783832190088
