= Sung-yong =

- Hangul: 성용
- RR: Seongyong
- MR: Sŏngyong

Sung-yong, also spelled Seng-yong in the Yale transcription system or Seong-yong in Revised Romanization, is a Korean given name.

== People ==
People with this name include:

- Yu Sŏngnyong (1542–1607), Joseon Dynasty scholar-official
- Woo Sung-yong (born 1974), South Korean football coach and former forward
- Choi Sung-yong (born 1975), South Korean football midfielder
- Jung Sung-ryong (born 1985), South Korean football goalkeeper
- Kim Seng-yong (born 1987), Zainichi Korean football striker with North Korean citizenship
- Ki Sung-yueng (born 1989), South Korean football midfielder

== See also ==
- List of Korean given names
- Nam Sung-yong (1912–2001), Korean marathon runner of the Japanese colonial period, whose given name is spelled "Seung-ryong" (승룡) in Revised Romanisation
