= Tamao =

Tamao (written: 玉緒, 玉男 or 珠緒) is a feminine Japanese given name. Notable people with the name include:

- Tamao Akae (赤江 珠緒, born 1975), Japanese freelance announcer
- Tamao Nakamura (中村 玉緒, born 1939), Japanese actress
- Tamao Ozawa (小沢 珠緒, born 1985), Japanese retired professional boxer
- Tamao Satō (さとう 珠緒, born 1973), Japanese actress and voice actress
- Tamao Shiwaku (塩飽 玉男, 1906–1990), Japanese runner
- Tamao Yoshida (吉田 玉男, 1919–2006), Japanese puppeteer

== Fictional characters ==
- Tamao Mitsurugi, a character in the Variable Geo series
- Tamao Suzumi, a character in the Strawberry Panic! anime
- Tamao Tamamura, a character from Shaman King
- Tamao Tomoe, a character from the Revue Starlight franchise

== See also ==
- 31061 Tamao, an asteroid discovered on October 10, 1996
- Tamão, 16th-century Portuguese settlement in today's Hong Kong
