= Lipalit =

Lipalit is a surname. Notable people with the surname include:

- Elena Lipalit (born 1936), Romanian sprint canoer
- Igor Lipalit (1940–2021), Romanian sprint canoer
