= Canoeing at the 1952 Summer Olympics – Women's K-1 500 metres =

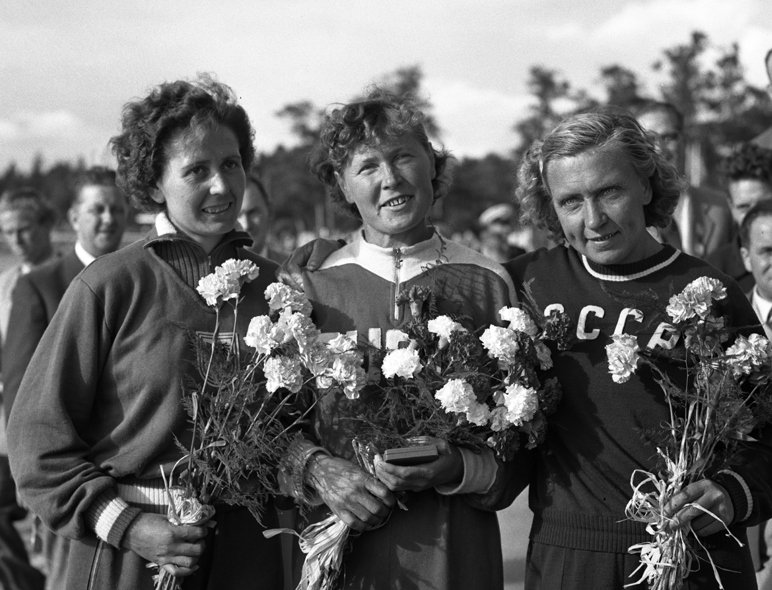
Left-right: Gertrude Liebhart, Sylvi Saimo and Nina Savina

This is a listing of the results for the women's K-1 500 metres competition in canoeing at the 1952 Summer Olympics. The K-1 event is raced by single-person canoe sprint kayaks. Heat and semifinals took place on July 28.

== Medalists ==
Gold	Silver	Bronze
Sylvi Saimo (FIN)	Gertrude Liebhart (AUT)	Nina Savina (URS)

== Heats ==
The 13 competitors first raced in three heats. The top three finishers in each heat moved directly to the final.

Heat 1
1.	Sylvi Saimo (FIN)	2:20.1	QF
2.	Gertrude Liebhart (AUT)	2:20.6	QF
3.	Cecilia Hartmann (HUN)	2:23.8	QF
4.	Eva Marion (FRA)	2:24.8
5.	Anna-Lisa Ohlsson (SWE)	2:28.3
Heat 2
1.	Nina Savina (URS)	2:22.1	QF
2.	Bodil Svendsen (DEN)	2:24.9	QF
3.	Marta Kroutilová (TCH)	2:27.1	QF
4.	Shirley Ascott (GBR)	2:34.4
Heat 3
1.	Alida van der Anker-Doedens (NED)	2:24.4	QF
2.	Josefa Köster (GER)	2:26.2	QF
3.	Therese Zenz (SAA)	2:26.9	QF
4.	Elisa Sidler (SUI)	2:43.1

== Final ==
Gold	Sylvi Saimo (FIN)	2:18.4
Silver	Gertrude Liebhart (AUT)	2:18.8
Bronze	Nina Savina (URS)	2:21.6
4.	Alida van der Anker-Doedens (NED)	2:22.3
5.	Bodil Svendsen (DEN)	2:22.7
6.	Cecilia Hartmann (HUN)	2:23.0
7.	Marta Kroutilová (TCH)	2:23.8
8.	Josefa Köster (GER)	2:25.9
9.	Therese Zenz (SAA)	2:27.9
