= Vilma Egresi =

Hungarian canoeist

Medal record

Women's canoe sprint

Olympic Games
Bronze medal – third place	1960 Rome	K-2 500 m

World Championships
Silver medal – second place	1954 Mâcon	K-2 500 m

Vilma Egresi (May 7, 1936 – January 7, 1979) is a Hungarian sprint canoer who competed from the mid-1950s to the early 1960s. She won a bronze medal in the K-2 500 m event at the 1960 Summer Olympics in Rome.

Egresi also won a silver medal in the K-2 500 m event at the 1954 ICF Canoe Sprint World Championships in Mâcon.
