= Franz Tuschek =

Austrian long-distance runner

Personal information
- Nationality: Austrian
- Born: 27 March 1899
- Died: 7 January 1967 (aged 67)

Sport
- Sport: Long-distance running
- Event: Marathon

Franz Tuschek (27 March 1899 – 7 January 1967) was an Austrian long-distance runner. He competed in the marathon at the 1936 Summer Olympics.
