= Franz Barsicke =

German long-distance runner (1905–1944)

Personal information
- Nationality: German
- Born: 15 May 1908 Breslau, Germany
- Died: 1944 (aged 38–39) Leningrad, Soviet Union

Sport
- Sport: Long-distance running
- Event: Marathon

Franz Barsicke (15 May 1908 – 1944) was a German long-distance runner. He competed in the marathon at the 1936 Summer Olympics. He was killed in action during World War II.
