= Patricia Moody =

British sprint canoer (born 1934)

Patricia Moody (13 November 1934 – 18 March 2020) was a British canoe sprinter who competed in the late 1950s. She finished seventh in the K-1 500 m event at the 1956 Summer Olympics in Melbourne.
