= Guillermo Suárez (athlete) =

Peruvian long-distance runner

Personal information
- Born: 8 September 1912 Lima, Peru
- Died: 31 May 1947 (aged 34)

Sport
- Sport: Long-distance running
- Event: Marathon

Guillermo Suárez (8 September 1912 – 31 May 1947) was a Peruvian long-distance runner. He competed in the marathon at the 1936 Summer Olympics.
