= Anna-Lisa Ohlsson =

Swedish canoeist (1925–2015)

Anna-Lisa Ohlsson-Nilsson (5 October 1925 – 13 April 2015) was a Swedish sprint canoeist who competed in the early 1950s. She was eliminated in heats of the K-1 500 m event at the 1952 Summer Olympics in Helsinki.
