= Lisa Schindler =

Austrian canoeist

Lisa Schindler (born 30 July 1929) is an Austrian sprint canoeist, born in Hamburg, Germany, who competed in the early 1960s. She finished ninth in the K-2 500 m event at the 1960 Summer Olympics in Rome.
