= Giannino Bulzone =

Italian long-distance runner

Personal information
- Nationality: Italian
- Born: Giovanni Bulzone; 9 May 1911 Gaeta, Italy
- Died: 7 July 1987 (aged 76) Rome, Italy

Sport
- Sport: Long-distance running
- Event: Marathon

Giannino Bulzone (9 May 1911 – 7 July 1987) was an Italian long-distance runner. He competed in the marathon at the 1936 Summer Olympics.
