= Wang Zhenglin =

Chinese long-distance runner

Personal information
- Nationality: Chinese
- Born: 21 October 1912 Shanghai, China
- Died: 30 April 2001 (aged 88) United States of America

Sport
- Sport: Long-distance running
- Event: Marathon

Wang Zhenglin (21 October 1912 – 30 April 2001; Chinese: 王正林; pinyin: Wáng Zhènglín) was a Chinese long-distance runner. He competed in the marathon at the 1936 Summer Olympics.
