= Bronisław Gancarz =

Polish long-distance runner

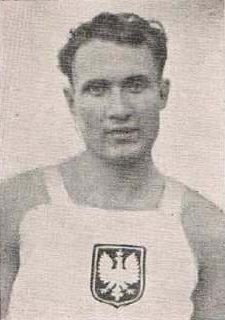
Bronisław Gancarz

Bronisław Gancarz (October 31, 1906 in Rudnik nad Sanem - September 30, 1960 in Nisko) was a Polish track and field athlete. Gancarz competed in the men's marathon for Poland at the 1936 Summer Olympics. He finished in 33rd place.

During World War II, he fought in the Polish Army in the September Campaign.
