= Maria Szkeli =

Romanian sprint canoer (born 1941)

Maria Szkeli (born 25 August 1941 in Târgu Mureș) is a Romanian sprint canoer who competed in the early 1960s. She finished sixth in the K-2 500 m event at the 1960 Summer Olympics in Rome.
