= Wilhelm Rothmayer =

Austrian long-distance runner

Personal information
- Nationality: Austrian
- Born: 18 December 1910
- Died: 2 March 1985 (aged 74)

Sport
- Sport: Long-distance running
- Event: Marathon

Wilhelm Rothmayer (18 December 1910 – 2 March 1985) was an Austrian long-distance runner. He competed in the marathon at the 1936 Summer Olympics.
