= Erkki Tamila =

Finnish long-distance runner

Personal information
- Nationality: Finnish
- Born: 5 May 1911 Nummi, Finland
- Died: 25 February 2004 (aged 92) Kauniainen, Finland

Sport
- Sport: Long-distance running
- Event: Marathon

Erkki Tamila (5 May 1911 – 25 February 2004) was a Finnish long-distance runner. He competed in the marathon at the 1936 Summer Olympics.

Tamila set two world records. He ran in Joensuu, Finland, on 30 August 1937 the 15 miles (24 km) race in 1h 19m 48.6s. Seven days later, on 6 September 1937, in the same city, he ran 25 kilometres (16 mi) in 1h 21.7m .
