= Ingrid Hartmann =

German canoeist

Medal record

Women's canoe sprint

Olympic Games
| Silver medal – second place | 1960 Rome | K-2 500 m |

World Championships
| Silver medal – second place | 1963 Jajce | K-4 500 m |
| Bronze medal – third place | 1958 Prague | K-2 500 m |

Ingrid Hartmann (23 July 1930 – 9 November 2006) was a German sprint canoer who competed in the late 1950s and early 1960s. She was born in Bad Salzuflen, Free State of Lippe. She won the K-2 500 m silver medal at the 1960 Summer Olympics in Rome. Hartmann also won two medals at the ICF Canoe Sprint World Championships with a silver (K-4 500 m: 1963) and a bronze (K-2 500 m: 1958).
