= Gabriella Cotta Ramusino =

Italian canoeist (born 1942)

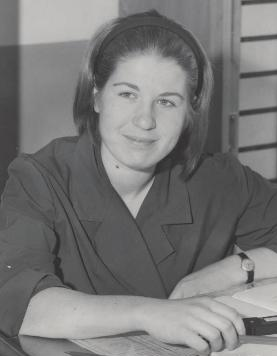
Cotta Ramusino at her workplace in 1963

Gabriella Cotta Ramusino (born 3 April 1942 in Pallanza) is an Italian former sprint canoer who competed in the early 1960s. She finished seventh in the K-2 500 m event at the 1960 Summer Olympics in Rome, in couple with Luciana Guindani.

Cotta Ramusino worked at a chemical plant in her hometown. After the end of her competitive sports career, she toured the world by bicycle alongside her husband. She suffered from intestinal cancer between the 1980s and 1990s.

== Sources ==
- Evans, Hilary; Gjerde, Arild; Heijmans, Jeroen; Mallon, Bill; et al. "Gabriella Cotta Ramusino". Olympics at Sports-Reference.com. Sports Reference LLC. Archived from the original on 22 October 2012.
