= Gertrude Liebhart =

Austrian canoeist (1928–2008)

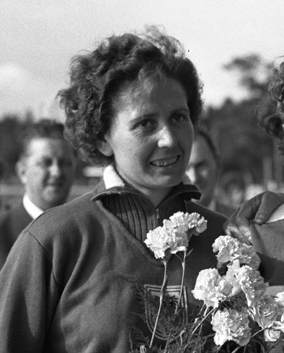
- Liebhart at the 1952 Olympics

Personal information
- Born: 26 October 1928 Langenzersdorf, Austria
- Died: 27 November 2008 (aged 80)

Sport
- Sport: Canoe sprint
Medal record
Representing Austria
Olympic Games
Silver medal – second place	1952 Helsinki	K-1 500 m
World Championships
Silver medal – second place	1950 Copenhagen	K-2 500 m
Bronze medal – third place	1948 London	K-2 500 m

Gertrude Liebhart (also Gertrude Liebhardt or Trude Liebhardt; 26 October 1928 – 27 November 2008) was an Austrian retired canoe sprinter who won a silver medal in the K-1 500 m event at the 1952 Olympics. She also won two medals in the K-2 500 m event at the ICF Canoe Sprint World Championships with a silver in 1950 and a bronze in 1948.

She was the sister of Kurt Liebhart, who represented Austria as a canoeist in the Summer Olympics of 1952 and 1960, and the niece of Karl Molnar, also a canoeist, who represented Austria at the Summer Olympics of 1948.
