= Eduard Braesecke =

German long-distance runner (1905–1989)

Personal information
- Full name: Eduard Theodor Georg Braesecke
- Nationality: German
- Born: 30 November 1905 Berlin, Germany
- Died: 12 February 1989 (aged 83) Zehdenick, East Germany

Sport
- Sport: Long-distance running
- Event: Marathon

Eduard Braesecke (30 November 1905 – 12 February 1989) was a German long-distance runner. He competed in the marathon at the 1936 Summer Olympics.
