= Franz Eha =

Swiss long-distance runner

Personal information
- Nationality: Swiss
- Born: 7 February 1907 Basel, Switzerland
- Died: August 1974 Lausanne, Switzerland

Sport
- Sport: Long-distance running
- Event: Marathon

Franz Eha (7 February 1907 – August 1974) was a Swiss long-distance runner. He competed in the marathon at the 1936 Summer Olympics.
