= Heidi Sager =

Australian canoeist

Heidi Annemarie Sager (29 September 1939 – 17 May 2004, married name Heidi Beard) was a German-born, Australian sprint canoeist who competed from c.1957-1960. At the 1960 Summer Olympics in Rome, she was eliminated in the semifinals both in the K-1 500 m event and the K-2 500 m event.
