= Josefa Köster =

German canoeist (1918–2011)

Josefa Köster (16 June 1918 – 17 April 2011) was a West German sprint canoeist who competed in the early 1950s. She finished eighth in the K-1 500 m event at the 1952 Summer Olympics in Helsinki.
