= Eva Kutová =

Czechoslovak sprint canoer (born 1935)

Eva Kutová (May 15, 1935 - September 4, 2016) standing at 173 cm tall and weighing 61 kg during her competitive years, was a Czechoslovak sprint canoeist who competed in the early 1960s. At the 1960 Summer Olympics in Rome, she finished eighth both in the K-1 500 m event and the K-2 500 m event.
