= Diane Jerome =

American canoeist (born 1941)

Diane Jerome (born February 1, 1941) is an American sprint canoer who competed in the early 1960s. She was eliminated in the repechage of the K-2 500 m event at the 1960 Summer Olympics in Rome.
