= Stane Šporn =

Yugoslav long-distance runner

Personal information
- Nationality: Yugoslav
- Born: 1 April 1904 Ljubljana, Austria-Hungary
- Died: 31 December 1944 (aged 40)

Sport
- Sport: Long-distance running
- Event: Marathon

Stane Šporn (1 April 1904 – 31 December 1944) was a Yugoslav long-distance runner. He competed in the marathon at the 1936 Summer Olympics.
