= Elisa Sidler =

Swiss canoeist

Elisa Sidler (born 23 January 1932) is a Swiss sprint canoer who competed in the early 1950s. She competed in the K-1 500 m event at the 1952 Summer Olympics in Helsinki, but was eliminated in the heats.
