= Mary Ann DuChai =

American sprint canoer (born 1939)

Mary Ann DuChai (born September 3, 1939) is an American sprint canoer who competed in the early 1960s. She was eliminated in the repechage of the K-2 500 m event at the 1960 Summer Olympics in Rome.
