= Gabrielle Lutz =

French canoeist

Gabrielle Lutz (4 February 1935 – 3 August 2011) was a French sprint canoeist who competed in the 1960s. She was born in Mulhouse. Lutz competed in the women's K-1 500 m event at the 1960 Summer Olympics in Rome, but was eliminated in the semifinals.
