= Miloslav Luňák =

Czech long-distance runner

Personal information
- Nationality: Czech
- Born: 2 February 1902 Most, Austria-Hungary

Sport
- Sport: Long-distance running
- Event: Marathon

Miloslav Luňák (born 2 February 1902) was a Czech long-distance runner. He competed in the marathon at the 1936 Summer Olympics.
