= Zanardi (surname) =

Zanardi is a surname. Notable people with the surname include:

- Alberta Zanardi (born 1940), Italian sprint canoer
- Alex Zanardi (1966–2026), Italian racing driver and paracyclist
- Caio Zanardi (born 1973), Brazilian football manager, brother of Márcio
- Gentile Zanardi (late 17th century), Italian painter
- Giovanni Zanardi (1700–1769), Italian painter
- Márcio Zanardi (born 1978), Brazilian football manager
- Silvia Zanardi (born 2000), Italian professional racing cyclist
