= Luciana Guindani =

Italian canoeist (1937–2020)

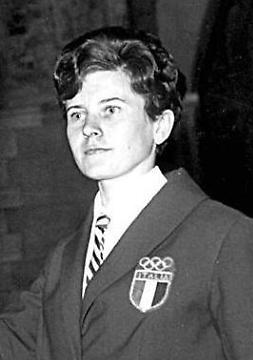
Guindani at the 1960 Olympics

Luciana Guindani (July 27, 1937 in Cremona – January 2, 2020 in Cremona) was an Italian sprint canoer who competed in the early 1960s. She finished seventh in the K-2 500 m event at the 1960 Summer Olympics in Rome, in couple with Gabriella Cotta Ramusino.

Guindani's father, Piero, was a cyclist and a car mechanic. She was married to fellow Cremonese canoer Giancarlo Cauzzi.
