= Jaime Mendes =

Portuguese long-distance runner

Personal information
- Nationality: Portuguese
- Born: 20 August 1913
- Died: 2 October 1990 (aged 77)

Sport
- Sport: Long-distance running
- Event: Marathon

Jaime Mendes (20 August 1913 – 2 October 1990) was a Portuguese long-distance runner. He competed in the marathon at the 1936 Summer Olympics.
