= Émile Duval =

French long-distance runner

Personal information
- Nationality: French
- Born: 5 July 1907 Berck, France
- Died: 13 April 1965 (aged 57)

Sport
- Sport: Long-distance running
- Event: Marathon

Émile Duval (5 July 1907 – 13 April 1965) was a French long-distance runner. He competed in the marathon at the 1936 Summer Olympics.
