= Janina Mendalska =

Polish canoeist

Janina Mendalska (10 January 1937 – 23 May 1999) was a Polish sprint canoeist who competed in the early 1960s. She finished fourth in the K-2 500 m event at the 1960 Summer Olympics in Rome.
