= Gabriel Mendoza (athlete) =

Peruvian long-distance runner

Personal information
- Nationality: Peruvian
- Born: 22 June 1906

Sport
- Sport: Long-distance running
- Event: Marathon

Gabriel Mendoza (born 22 June 1906, date of death unknown) was a Peruvian long-distance runner. He competed in the marathon at the 1936 Summer Olympics.
