= Josef Šulc =

Czech long-distance runner

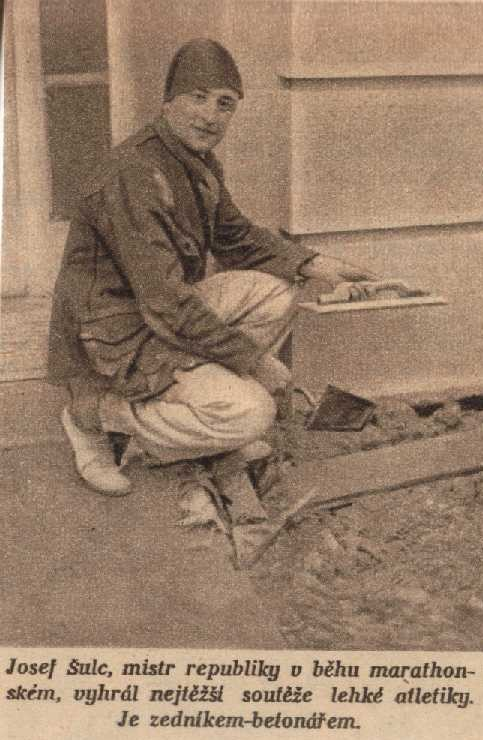
- Šulc ca. 1932.

Personal information
- Nationality: Czechoslovak
- Born: 12 September 1907 Pardubický kraj, Austria-Hungary
- Died: 10 July 1977 (aged 69)

Sport
- Sport: Long-distance running
- Event: Marathon

Josef Šulc (12 September 1907 – 10 July 1977) was a Czechoslovak long-distance runner. He competed in the marathon at the 1936 Summer Olympics.
