= Eva Kolínská =

Czechoslovak canoeist (1940–2020)

Eva Kolínská (24 July 1940 in Bohemia and Moravia, Germany – 21 April 2020) was a Czechoslovak sprint canoer who competed in the early 1960s. She finished eighth in the K-2 500 m event at the 1960 Summer Olympics in Rome.
