= Edith Cochrane =

Australian sprint canoeist

Edith Cochrane (born 8 September 1935) is an Australian sprint canoeist who competed in the late 1950s. She finished fifth in the K-1 500 m event at the 1956 Summer Olympics in Melbourne.
