= C. S. A. Swami =

Indian long-distance runner

Personal information
- Nationality: Indian
- Born: 31 December 1913 Ootacamund (Ooty), Madras Presidency, India
- Died: 22 October 1997 (aged 84) Coimbatore, Tamil Nadu, India
- Height: 165 cm (5 ft 5 in)
- Weight: 54 kg (119 lb)

Sport
- Sport: Long-distance running
- Event: Marathon
- Club: Indian National Olympic Team

Christopher Sebastian Arul Swami (31 December 1913 – 22 October 1997), better known as C. S. A. Swami, was an Indian journalist and athlete. He competed in the marathon at the 1936 Summer Olympics. Aged 22 in 1936, he was the youngest participant for India at the 1936 Berlin Summer Games.

At the time of the Olympics, Swami had a personal best of 2 hours and 47 seconds in the marathon. During the journey to Berlin, Swami caught paratyphoid in Malta. In Berlin, he was stretchered to the Olympic Village and then stayed in a hospital for three weeks. The 100-pound Swami was described as the "smallest athlete in the games" by Lawson Robertson, the head coach of the American athletics team.

Despite being frail, Swami started the Olympic marathon. Halfway through the race, he became ill. He collapsed at the finish and was carried back to the hospital. Swami had a time of 3:10:44.0 and he was 37th among the 42 runners who completed the course. A further 18 runners, including the defending champion Juan Carlos Zabala, did not complete the race.

Besides being a runner over several distances, Swami was a shooter, football coach and referee. He had a journalistic career in the Free Press Journal, Times of India and Indian Express. He joined Indian Express in 1947 and retired as the Chief Sports Editor in 1984.
