= Nouba Khaled =

French long-distance runner

Personal information
- Nationality: French
- Born: 11 December 1905
- Died: 1943 (aged 37–38)

Sport
- Sport: Long-distance running
- Event: Marathon

Nouba Khaled (11 December 1905 – 1943) was a French long-distance runner. He competed in the marathon at the 1936 Summer Olympics. He was killed on the Eastern Front during World War II.
