= Birgit Jensen =

Danish canoeist (born 1940)

Birgit Jensen (born January 9, 1940) is a Danish sprint canoer who competed in the early 1960s. Finishing fifth in the K-2 500 m event at the 1960 Summer Olympics in Rome; it was her one and only ever Olympic appearance.
