= Yelizaveta Dementyeva =

Soviet sprint canoer (1928–2022)

Medal record

Women's canoe sprint

Olympic Games
Gold medal – first place	1956 Melbourne	K-1 500 m

World Championships
Gold medal – first place	1958 Prague	K-1 500 m
Silver medal – second place	1958 Prague	K-2 500 m

Yelizaveta Dementyeva (née Kislova; 5 March 1928 – 27 July 2022) was a Russian canoe sprinter who competed in the late 1950s. At the 1956 Summer Olympics in Melbourne, she won a gold medal in the K-1 500 m event. Dementyeva also won two medals at the 1958 ICF Canoe Sprint World Championships in Prague with a gold in the K-1 500 m and a silver in the K-2 500 m events.
