= Eila Eskola-Kyröläinen =

Finnish canoeist

Eila Eskola-Kyröläinen (28 June 1931 – 20 July 2015) was a Finnish sprint canoeist who competed in the late 1950s and early 1960s. Competing in two Summer Olympics, she earned her best finish of ninth in the K-1 500 m event at Rome in 1960. She was born in Ruovesi.
