= Klára Fried-Bánfalvi =

Hungarian canoeist (1931–2009)

Medal record

Women's canoe sprint

Representing Hungary

Olympic Games
Bronze medal – third place	1960 Rome	K-2 500 m

World Championships
Gold medal – first place	1954 Mâcon	K-2 500 m

Klára Fried-Bánfalvi (9 May 1931 – 15 July 2009) was a Hungarian sprint canoeist who competed from the late 1940s to the early 1960s.

Competing in two Summer Olympics, she won a bronze medal in the K-2 500 m event at Rome in 1960. Fried-Bánfalvi also won a gold medal in the K-2 500 m event at the 1954 ICF Canoe Sprint World Championships in Mâcon.

She was Jewish.

== See also ==
- List of select Jewish canoeists
