= Sabahattin Kuruoğlu =

Turkish footballer

Personal information
- Date of birth: 9 January 1938
- Date of death: December 7, 1995 (aged 57)

International career
| Years | Team | Apps | (Gls) |
| 1961–1965 | Turkey | 9 | (0) |

Sabahattin Kuruoğlu (9 January 1938 – 7 December 1995) was a Turkish footballer. He played in nine matches for the Turkey national football team from 1961 to 1965.
