= Marianne Tucker =

British canoeist

Marianne Tucker (born 23 October 1937) is a British former sprint canoeist who competed in the early to mid-1960s. She represented Great Britain at two Summer Olympics, participating in the K-1 500 metres event. At the 1960 Summer Olympics in Rome, she reached the semifinals, finishing in fourth place. Four years later, at the 1964 Summer Olympics in Tokyo, she again advanced to the semifinals, placing fifth.
