= Nam Sung-yong =

Korean marathon runner

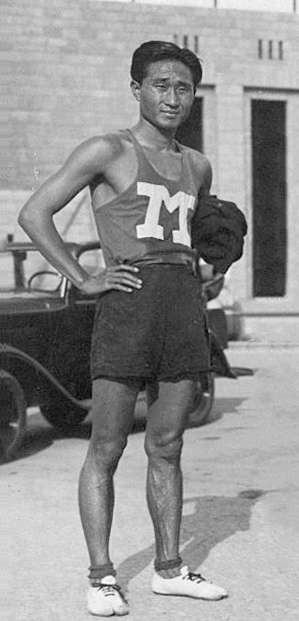
- Nam Sung-yong at the 1936 Olympics

Personal information
- Nationality: Japan (1912–1945); South Korea (1945–2001)
- Born: Nan Shōryū; November 23, 1912 Junten, South Zenra, Korea (now Suncheon, South Korea)
- Died: February 20, 2001 (aged 88)
- Height: 1.65 m (5 ft 5 in)
- Weight: 56 kg (123 lb)
Medal record
Representing Japan
Olympic Games
Bronze medal – third place	1936 Berlin	Marathon

- Nam Sung-yong
- Hangul: 남승룡
- Hanja: 南昇龍
- RR: Nam Seungryong
- MR: Nam Sŭngnyong

Nam Sung-yong (November 23, 1912 – February 20, 2001) was a Korean Olympian who won a bronze medal in the marathon at the 1936 Summer Olympics, completing the run in 2 hours, 31 minutes, and 42 seconds.

== Early life and education ==
He was born in Junten (now Suncheon, South Korea), in Korea, then a part of the Empire of Japan's Zenranan Province. He received higher education in Japan.

== Career ==
He won a bronze medal in the marathon at the 1936 Summer Olympics, completing the run in 2 hours, 31 minutes, and 42 seconds. Since Korea at the time was a part of the Empire of Japan, making him a Japanese subject, the IOC credits the medal to Japan.

Like the gold medalist Sohn Kee-chung, Nam Sung-yong used the Japanese pronunciation of his name, Nan Shōryū as Korea was then a part of the Empire of Japan.

After the Olympics, Nam Sung-yong worked at the Korean Sporting Association with Sohn Kee-chung.
