= Nina Savina (canoeist) =

Soviet canoeist

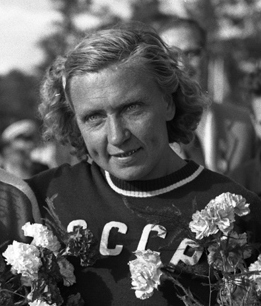
- Savina at the 1952 Olympics

Personal information
- Born: 29 September 1915 Petrograd, Russian Empire
- Died: 1965 (aged 49-50) Leningrad, Russian SFSR, Soviet Union

Sport
- Sport: Canoe sprint
- Club: Pishchevik Leningrad
Medal record
Representing the Soviet Union
Olympic Games
| Bronze medal – third place | 1952 Helsinki | K-1 500 m |

Nina Vasilyevna Savina (Russian: Нина Васильевна Савина; 29 September 1915 – 1965) was a Russian canoe sprinter who won a bronze medal in the K-1 500 m event at the 1952 Summer Olympics. Savina won 18 Soviet titles in various rowing events. She held a PhD in pedagogy.
