= Max Beer (athlete) =

Swiss long-distance runner

Personal information
- Nationality: Swiss
- Born: 15 September 1912 Hosenruck, Switzerland
- Died: 19 December 1995 Bern, Switzerland

Sport
- Sport: Long-distance running
- Event: Marathon

Max Beer (15 September 1912 – 19 December 1995) was a Swiss long-distance runner. He competed in the marathon at the 1936 Summer Olympics.
