= Henry Palmé =

Swedish marathon runner

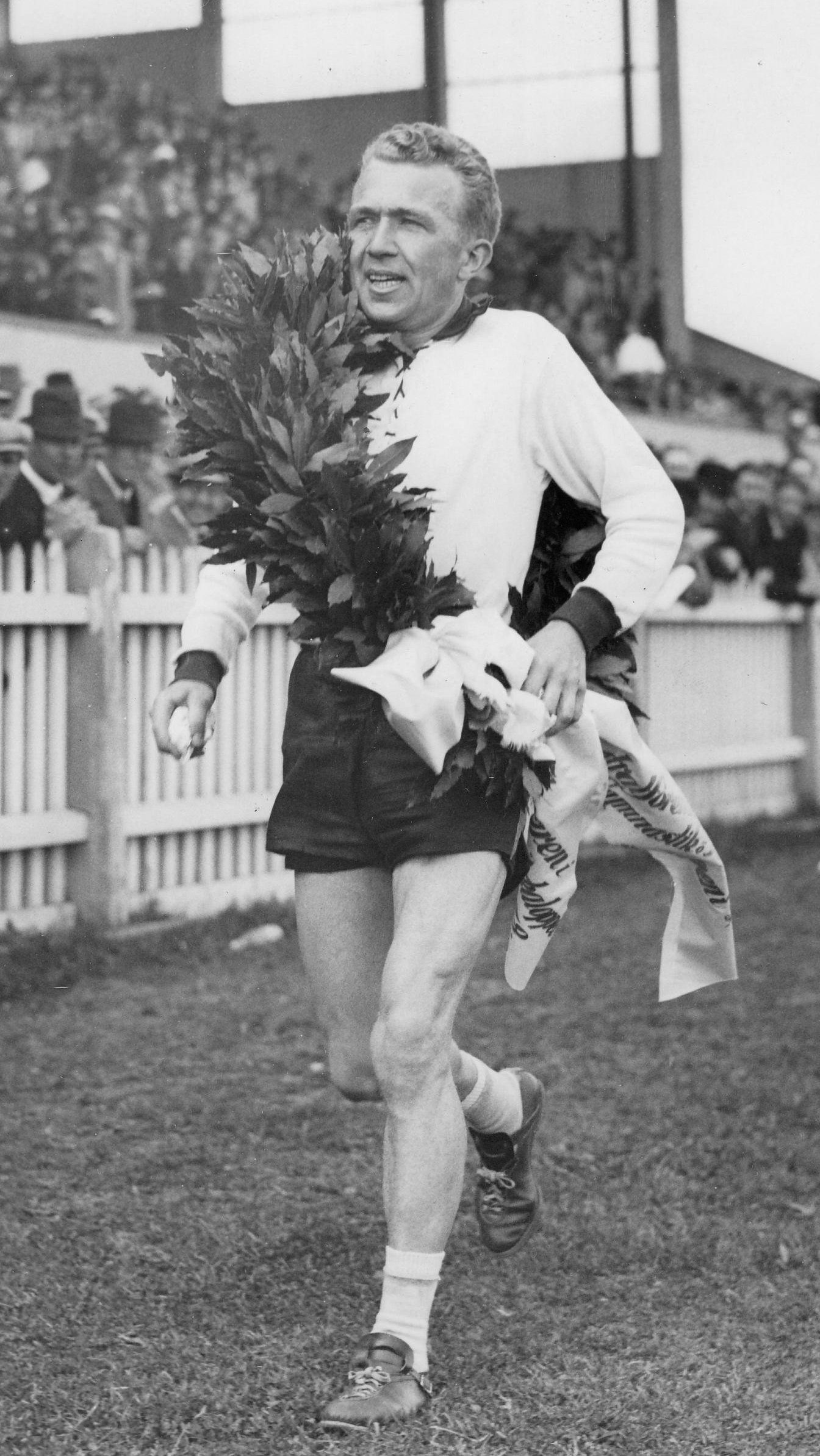

Personal information
- Born: 4 September 1907 Flädie, Sweden
- Died: 2 June 1987 (aged 79) Enskede, Sweden
- Height: 1.69 m (5 ft 7 in)
- Weight: 57 kg (126 lb)

Sport
- Sport: Athletics
- Event: Marathon
- Club: Fredrikshofs IF, Stockholm

Achievements and titles
- Personal best: 2:36:56 (1939)
Medal record
Men's athletics
Representing Sweden
European Championships
Bronze medal – third place	1938 Paris	Marathon

Henry Artur Palmé (4 September 1907 – 2 June 1987) was a Swedish marathon runner. He finished 13th at the 1936 Summer Olympics and won a bronze medal at the 1938 European Athletics Championships.

Palmé held national titles in the marathon (1934 to 1944) and 8 km cross country (1934 and 1941). He won the Sporting Life's marathon in London in 1938 and 1939.
