= Alberta Zanardi =

Italian canoeist (born 1940)

Alberta Zanardi (born January 6, 1940 in Mantua) is an Italian sprint canoer who competed in the early 1960s. She finished seventh in the K-1 500 m event at the 1960 Summer Olympics in Rome.
