= Anders Hartington Andersen =

Danish long-distance runner

Personal information
- Nationality: Danish
- Born: 1 February 1907 Ringsted, Denmark
- Died: 10 January 1996 (aged 88) Himmelev, Denmark

Sport
- Sport: Long-distance running
- Event: Marathon

Anders Hartington Andersen (1 February 1907 – 10 January 1996) was a Danish long-distance runner. He competed in the marathon at the 1932 Summer Olympics and the 1936 Summer Olympics.
