= Felix Meskens =

Belgian long-distance runner (1906–1973)

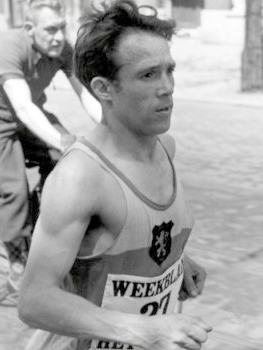
- Felix Meskens in 1938

Personal information
- Nationality: Belgian
- Born: 14 November 1906 Molenbeek-Saint-Jean
- Died: 10 January 1973 (aged 66) Brussels

Sport
- Sport: Long-distance running
- Event: Marathon

Felix Meskens (14 November 1906 – 10 January 1973) was a Belgian long-distance runner. He competed in the marathon at the 1936 Summer Olympics.
