= Therese Zenz =

West German canoeist

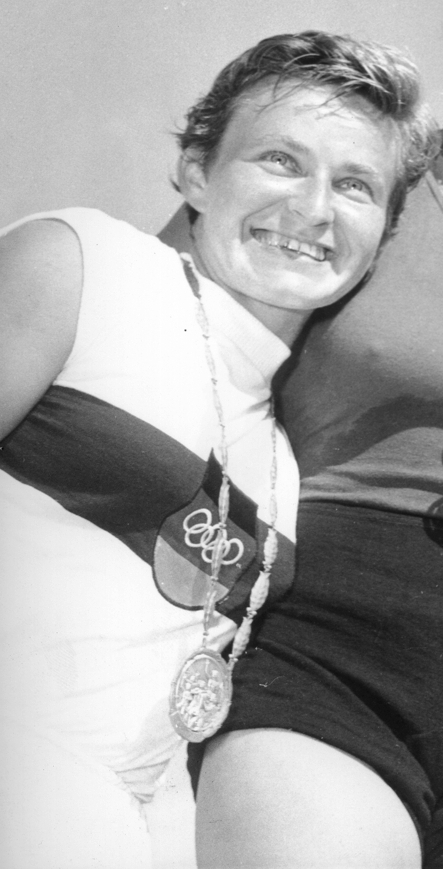
- Zenz at the 1960 Olympics

Personal information
- Born: 15 October 1932 Merzig, Germany
- Died: 22 October 2019 (aged 87) Merzig
- Height: 165 cm (5 ft 5 in)
- Weight: 65 kg (143 lb)

Sport
- Sport: Canoeing
- Club: Kanufreunde Mettlach
Medal record
Representing Saar
World Championships
Gold medal – first place	1954 Mâcon	K-1 500 m
Representing Germany
Olympic Games
Silver medal – second place	1956 Melbourne	K-1 500 m
Silver medal – second place	1960 Rome	K-1 500 m
Silver medal – second place	1960 Rome	K-2 500 m
Representing West Germany
World Championships
Bronze medal – third place	1958 Prague	K-1 500 m
Bronze medal – third place	1958 Prague	K-2 500 m

Theresia Maria "Therese" Zenz (15 October 1932 – 22 October 2019) was a Saar-born German canoe sprinter. She took part in the 1952, 1956 and 1960 Olympics and won three silver medals for the United Team of Germany in 1956 and 1960. At the 1952 games she competed for Saar and finished ninth in the K-1 500 metres event. She later became a coach for the West German team.

Zenz won three medals at the ICF Canoe Sprint World Championships with a gold (K-1 500 m: 1954 for Saar) and two bronzes (K-1 500 m and K-2 500 m: both 1958 for West Germany).
