= Dave Holliday =

Australian rules footballer, born 1904

Personal information
- Full name: Dave Holliday
- Born: 11 February 1904
- Died: 15 December 1995 (aged 91)
- Height: 173 cm (5 ft 8 in)
- Weight: 80 kg (176 lb)

Playing career^{1}
Years	Club	Games (Goals)
1931	North Melbourne	3 (1)
- ^{1} Playing statistics correct to the end of 1931.

Dave Holliday (11 February 1904 – 15 December 1995) was an Australian rules footballer who played with North Melbourne in the Victorian Football League (VFL).
