= Éva Marion =

French canoeist (1925–2019)

Éva Jeanne Marion (5 March 1925 – 10 February 2019) was a French sprint canoeist who competed in the 1950s. Competing in two Summer Olympics, she earned her best finish of eighth in the K-1 500 m event at Melbourne in 1956.
