= Veliko Tarnovo University =

Educational institution in Veliko Tarnovo, Bulgaria

Coordinates: 43°4′42″N 25°38′57″E

St. Cyril and St. Methodius University of Veliko Tarnovo
- Великотърновски университет „Св. св. Кирил и Методий“
- Type: Public
- Established: 1963
- Rector: Prof. Dr. Dimiter Dimitrov
- Students: over 18,000
- Location: Veliko Tarnovo, Bulgaria
- Website: www.uni-vt.bg

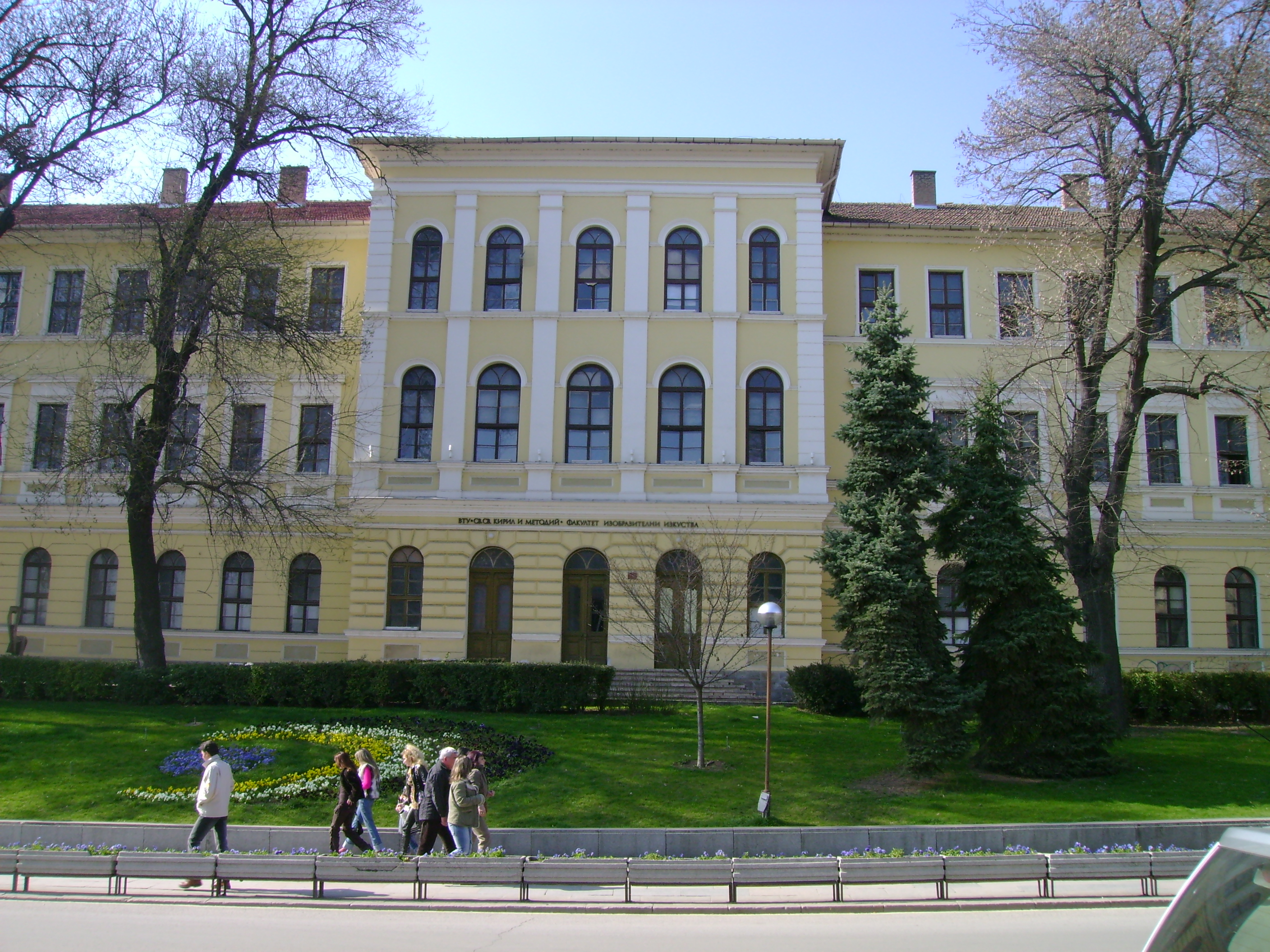
The Faculty of Fine Arts building

The St. Cyril and St. Methodius University of Veliko Tarnovo (Bulgarian Великотърновски университет „Св. св. Кирил и Методий“) is a Bulgarian university based in Veliko Tarnovo.

== History ==
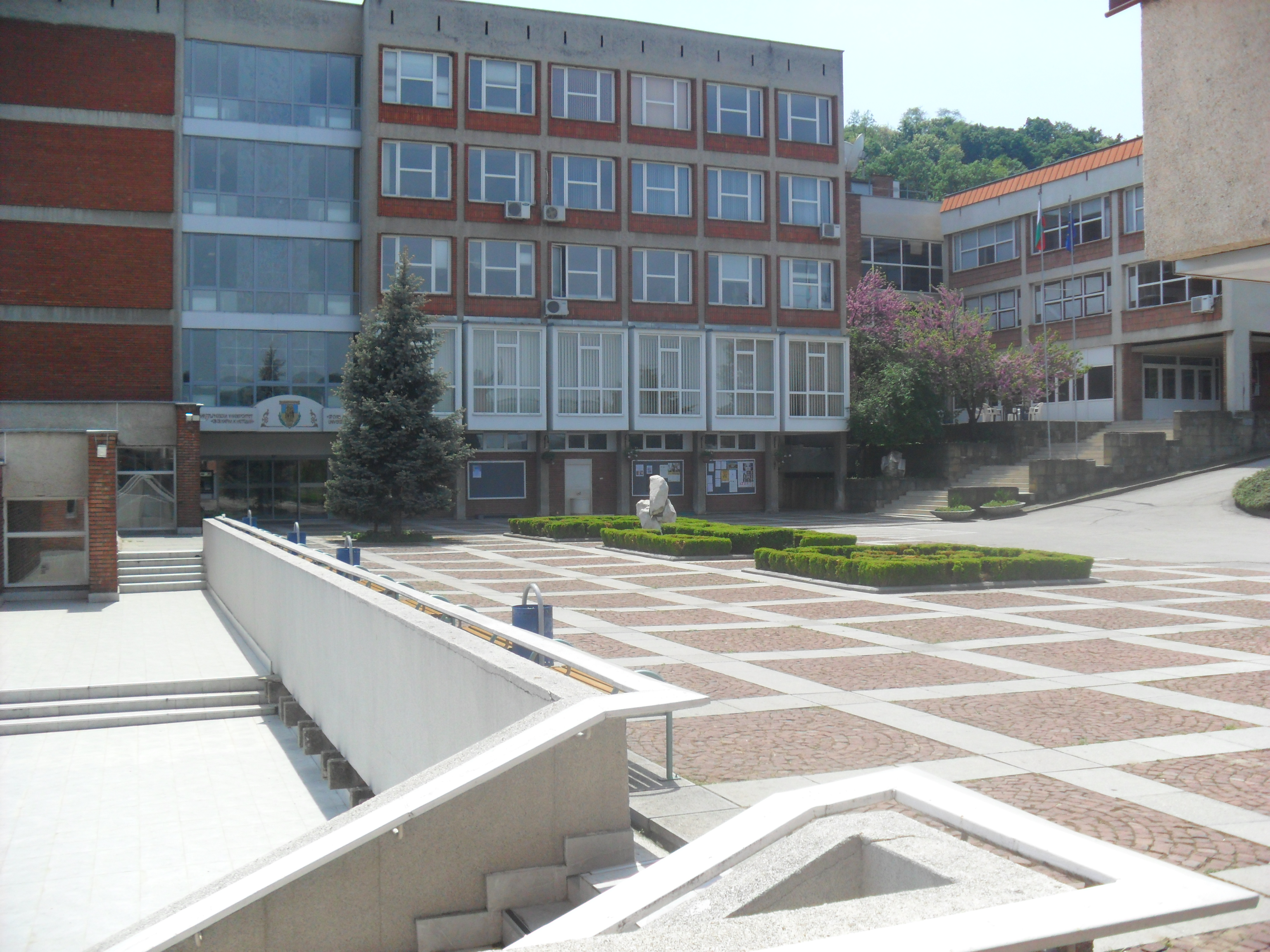
The Rectorate of the university on hill Sveta Gora

The university was established on 15 September 1963. It inherited the cultural and education traditions of Turnovo Literary School. In the first academic year, 25 professors, assistants and teachers came from universities in Sofia and the Bulgarian Academy of Science. The first subjects were Bulgarian Philology, Russian Philology, History and Art. The university was founded by Aleksandar Burmov and Penio Rusev.

In 1971 the school was accredited as Veliko Tarnovo University "St. Cyril and St. Methodius".

== Structure ==
The university is divided into 9 faculties:

- Faculty of Economics
- Faculty of Education
- Faculty of Fine Arts
- Faculty of History
- Faculty of Law
- Faculty of Modern Languages
- Faculty of Orthodox Theology
- Faculty of Philosophy
- Faculty of Mathematics and Informatics

== Rectors ==
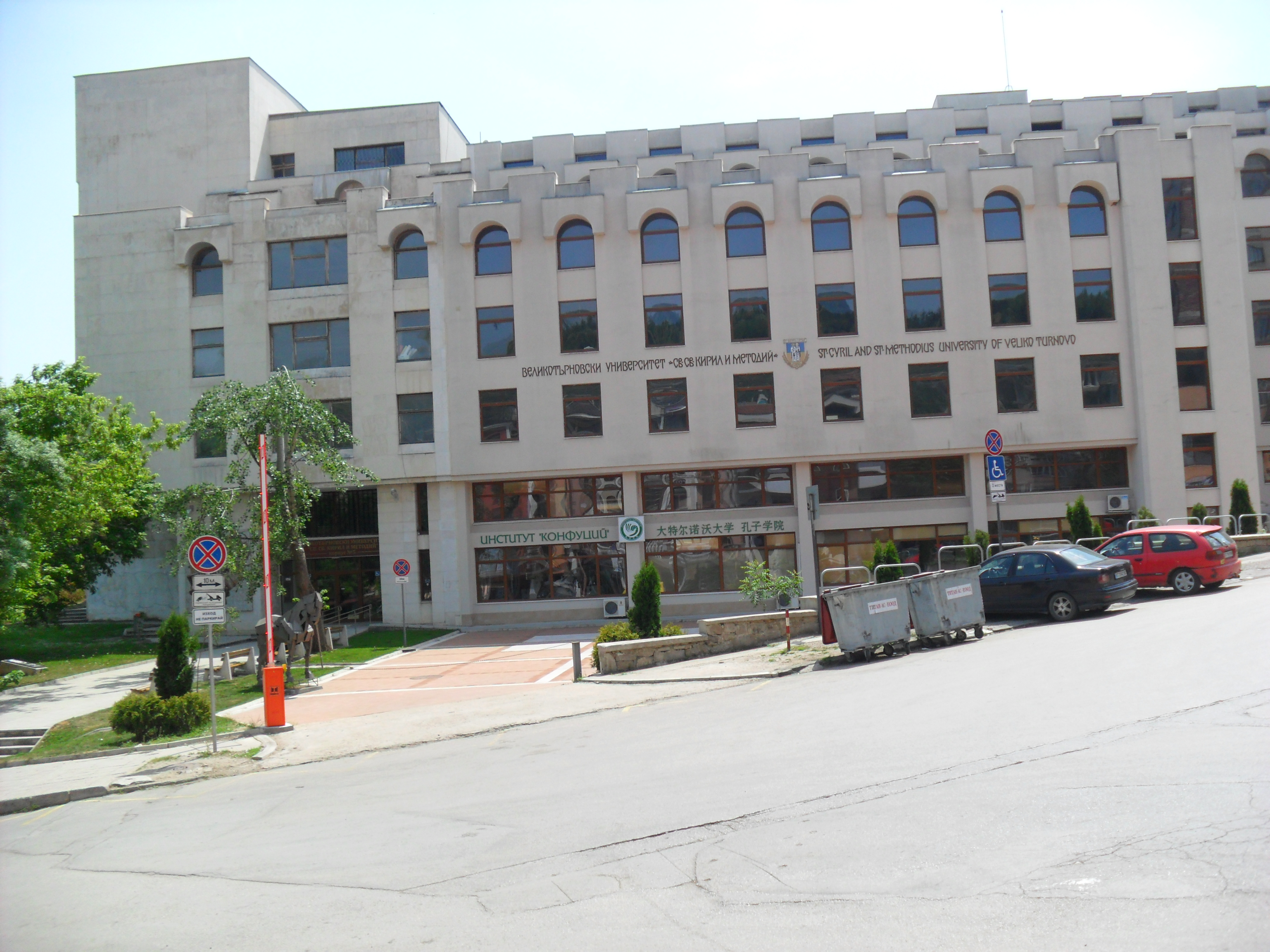
Housing structure 5 in the center of Veliko Tarnovo

- Alexander Burmov
- Jelyo Avdjiev
- Vladimir Popov
- Stanio Georgiev
- Ivan Stoyanov
- Ivan Haralampiev
- Plamen Anatoliev Legkostup
- Dimitar Yordanov Dimitrov

== See also ==
- Balkan Universities Network
- List of colleges and universities
