= Maunoury =

Maunoury is a surname. Notable people with the surname include:

- Auguste-François Maunoury (born 1811), Catholic Hellenist and exegete
- Catherine Maunoury, French aerobatic pilot
- Ernest Maunoury (1894–1921), French World War I flying ace
- Maurice Bourgès-Maunoury (1914–1993), French Radical politician, Prime Minister in the Fourth Republic during 1957
- Maurice Maunoury (1863–1925), French politician born in Egypt, Minister of the Colonies, Minister of the Interior
- Michel-Joseph Maunoury (1847–1923), commander of French forces in the early days of World War I
- Simon Maunoury, male badminton player from France
