= Shirley Ascott =

British sprint canoer

Ascott in 1952.

Shirley Ascott (10 December 1930 – 29 December 1995) was a British canoe sprinter who competed in the early 1950s. She competed in the K-1 500 m event at the 1952 Summer Olympics in Helsinki, but was eliminated in the heats.

== Biography ==
Ascott was from Hounslow, Middlesex. During the Second World War, she was evacuated, and studied at Fleetwood Grammar School. She worked in an aircraft factory, and started canoeing in 1950. In 1952, Ascott was one of two British women who attempted to qualify for the 1952 Summer Olympics; after winning the trial event, she was selected for the Games. At the Games, she was eliminated in the heats.
