= Marta Kroutilová =

Czechoslovak sprint canoeist

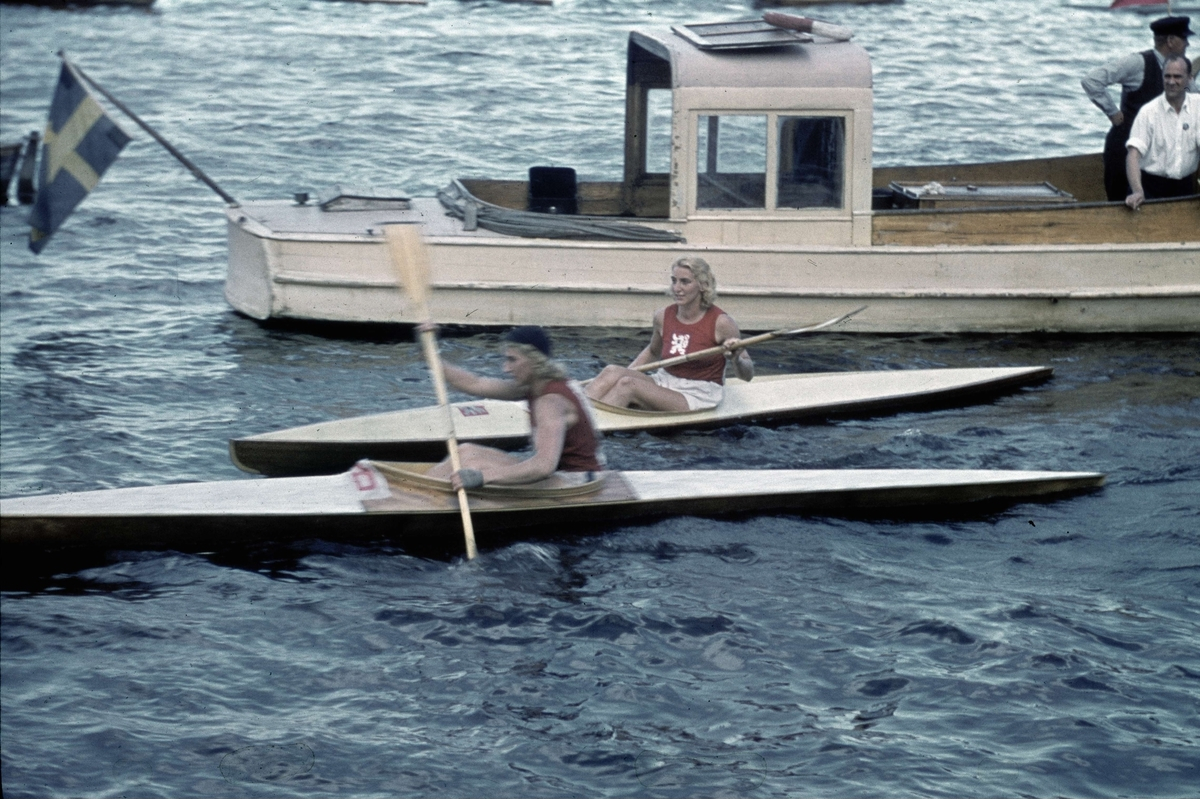

Marta Kroutilová (21 September 1925 – 17 April 2017) is a Czechoslovak sprint canoeist who competed in the early 1950s. She finished seventh in the K-1 500 m event at the 1952 Summer Olympics in Helsinki.

She married and her full surname is Kroutilová-Pavlisová.
