= Boris Kharalampiev =

Bulgarian long-distance runner

Personal information
- Nationality: Bulgarian
- Born: 8 February 1908
- Died: Unknown

Sport
- Sport: Long-distance running
- Event: Marathon

Boris Kharalampiev (Bulgarian: Борис Харалампиев; 8 February 1908 – ?) was a Bulgarian long-distance runner. He competed in the marathon at the 1936 Summer Olympics.
