= Annemarie Werner-Hansen =

Danish canoeist

Annemarie Werner-Hansen (21 July 1939 – 11 October 1993) was a Danish canoe sprinter who competed in the early to mid-1960s. Competing two Summer Olympics, she earned her best finish of fourth in the K-1 500 m event at Rome in 1960.
