= John Dylan =

Thai actor (1978–1995)

- จอห์น ดีแลน
- Born: John Dylan Postlethwaite; August 15, 1978; Bangkok, Thailand
- Died: December 1, 1995 (aged 17); Si Racha District, Chonburi Province, Thailand
- Occupations: Actor; model; television host
- Years active: 1995–1996
- Agent: Poj Arnon

John Dylan Postlethwaite (Thai: จอห์น ดีแลน โพสเตอร์เวท; 15 August 1978 – 1 December 1995) was a British-Thai actor, model, and television host. He is known for being starred in Muer Mok Salai, as Tasha.

== Life and career ==
John Dylan Postlethwaite was born on August 15, 1978, in Bangkok. His father, Jeffrey Postlethwaite, was an English man, and his wife, a Thai Mother. He grew up in Bang Lamung District, Chonburi Province. He finished high school at Aksorn Suksa School. John started his acting career when he founded Poj Arnon at Siam Square. He gained popularity from magazine and a prominent Fujifilm commercial. In 1995, he starred in Five Star Production films Sati Taek Sut Kualok and Goodbye Summer. He made a TV debut in the Channel 7HD drama Muer Mok Salai with Sarocha Watitapun.

== Death ==
On 1 December, 1995, at approximately 9:20 p.m., John died in a car accident at the age of 17, when he was driving in Sukhumvit Road in Thung Sukhla, Si Racha District, when his Porsche car he was traveling flipped over and caught fire with a tire blowout. Both John and the driver, Samkhans Sangkhawanich, died at the scene. While other reports claimed he was traveling home to Chonburi with a relative.
