= Dudar Hahanov =

Soviet Ossetian conductor and composer (1921–1995)

Dudar Solomonovich Hahanov PhD (Russian: Дудар Соломонович Хаханов; Iron Ossetic: Хаханты Соломоны фырт Дудар; 4 July 1921 – 26 December 1995) was a Soviet Ossetian composer, violinist and conductor. Honored art worker of the RSFSR (1974). A member of the CPSU(b) since 1942.

== Biography ==
Dudar Hahanov was born 4 July 1921 in Tskhinvali.

In 1940–1942, he was a student of Tbilisi state Conservatoire in violin (class of Professor O. Lednik).

In 1942-1947 he was the head of the musical part of the South Ossetian drama theatre, teacher at children's music school.

In 1947 he graduated from the theoretical composition faculty of the Tbilisi Conservatory, composition class (teacher Professor I. I. Tuskiya).

In 1952-1954 he was the artistic Director of the North Ossetian state song and dance ensemble.

In 1964–1965, the artistic Director of the North Ossetian state Philharmonic.

In 1961-1968 he was the Chairman of the Board of the Union of composers of the North Ossetian ASSR.

Member of composers Union of the USSR since 1953

Died 26 December 1995 in Tbilisi. He was buried in Tskhinvali.

== Music ==
Ballets:

- "Khetag" in 2 acts, libretto by A. Hadarceva based on the eponymous poem by Kosta Khetagurov (1963, set in 1979);
- "Atsamaz and Agunda", one act, libretto by D. Tuaeva based Nart sagas (1961)

Opera:

- "Khanty Zagd", in 2 acts, libretto by S. Kaitukov (1975),
- "Ossetian melody" (1976),
- "Lights in the mountains", in 2 acts, libretto by M. Tsagaraev and I. Sharoev based on the novel by M. Tsagaraev "Shepherd of the Black mountains" (1980),
- The "Caucasian Gorlinka", libretto by D. Temiryaev (1985);

Operetta:

- "Handzarifa", in 3 acts, libretto by M. Shavlohov (1948),
- "Wrestling", in 2 acts, libretto by G. Khugaev (1962),
- "Hamat and Zarina", in 2 acts, libretto by N. Kadzov (1963),
- "Our children and daughter-in-law", in 2 acts, libretto by N. Areshidze (1966),
- "Agrimony", in 3 acts, libretto by S. Hachirov (1967),
- "A girl of marriageable age", libretto by G. K. Bitsoev and K. Chodov (1980);

For orchestra:

- Symphony No. 1 "Youth" in 4 parts
- Symphony No. 2 "Vladimir Ilyich Lenin" (1969)
- Symphony No. 3
- Symphony No. 4
- Symphony No. 5 "Kosta Kheetagurov" (1979)
- Symphony No. 6 (1982)
- Symphony No. 7
- Symphony No. 8
- Symphony No. 9
- Symphony-Concerto No. 10 for piano and Symphony orchestra
- Symphony No. 11
- Symphony No. 12 "The Tragedy Of South Ossetia"

Vocal-symphonic:

- Cantata for soloists, choir and orchestra "Glory to labor" in the words of G. Dzugaev (1954),
- Cantata "Live and Hello Iriston"
- Cantata "a Solemn song", for soloists, chorus and orchestra, words by G. Pliev
- Oratorio "the Singer of the people", for soloists, chorus and orchestra of folk instruments at the words G. Dzugaev (1959)

Concerts:

- Concerto for ossetian harmonica and orchestra
- Concert for voice and orchestra
- Concerto for violin and orchestra
- Concerto for cello and orchestra
- Concerto for trumpet and orchestra

== Awards & titles ==
- Honored art worker of the RSFSR (1974).
- Honored art worker of the Georgian SSR (1957).
- Honored art worker of the North Ossetian ASSR (1960).
- State prize of North-Ossetian ASSR name Khetagurov (1969, for the Symphony No. 2).
- PhD (1973).
- Medal For the defense of the Caucasus.
- Medal For valiant labor.
