= Cecilia Hartmann =

Hungarian canoeist

Cecília Hartmann-Berkes (born 14 February 1931) is a Hungarian sprint canoeist who competed in the 1950s. Competing in two Summer Olympics, she earned her best finish of fourth in the K-1 500 m event at Melbourne in 1956. She was born in Budapest, Kingdom of Hungary.
