= Cynthia Nicholas (canoeist) =

Australian sprint canoeist (born 1937)

Cynthia Nicholas (born 5 September 1937) is an Australian sprint canoeist who competed in the early 1960s. She was eliminated in the repechage of the K-2 500 m event at the 1960 Summer Olympics in Rome.
