= Ivan Haralampiev =

Bulgarian linguist (1946–2025)

- Born: Ivan Haralampiev; 11 November 1946; Kyustendil, Bulgaria
- Died: 29 January 2025 (aged 78)
- Other names: Иван Харалампиев
- Occupation: Linguist
- Notable work: History of the Bulgarian Literary Language until the Bulgarian National Revival

Ivan Haralampiev (11 November 1946 – 29 January 2025) was a Bulgarian linguist.

== Life and career ==
Haralampiev was born in Kyustendil, Bulgaria on 11 November 1946. He graduated with a degree in Bulgarian Philology from the Veliko Tarnovo University "St. Cyril and St. Methodius" in 1973 and in 1999 defended his professorship.

Haralampiev was Rector of Veliko Tarnovo University, as well as a full member and full professor of the Public Academy on Security, Defense and Legal Issues in Moscow. He was awarded the Russian Order "Lomonosov".

He was regarded among the world's top specialists and scholars in the history and periodization of the Bulgarian literary language. He wrote over 150 scientific publications, including 12 books, textbooks and teaching aids.

Haralampiev died on 29 January 2025, at the age of 78.
