= Elena Lipalit =

Romanian canoeist (born 1936)

Elena Lipalit (born March 22, 1936 in Tulcea) is a Romanian sprint canoer who competed in the early 1960s. She finished sixth in the K-2 500 m event at the 1960 Summer Olympics in Rome.
