= Adalbert Iordache =

Romanian water polo player

Personal information
- Nationality: Romanian
- Born: 28 January 1919; Cluj-Napoca, Romania
- Died: 21 December 1995 (aged 76); Bucharest, Romania

Sport
- Sport: Water polo

Adalbert Iordache (28 January 1919 – 21 December 1995) was a Romanian water polo player. He competed in the men's tournament at the 1952 Summer Olympics.
