= Mauno Tarkiainen =

Finnish long-distance runner

Personal information
- Nationality: Finnish
- Born: 18 August 1904 Haukivuori, Finland
- Died: 8 December 1971 (aged 67) Pieksämäki, Finland

Sport
- Sport: Long-distance running
- Event: Marathon

Mauno Tarkiainen (18 August 1904 – 8 December 1971) was a Finnish long-distance runner. He competed in the marathon at the 1936 Summer Olympics.
