= Jean Aubry =

French gymnast

- Full name: Jean Robert Raymond Aubry
- Born: 18 March 1913 Chartres, France
- Died: 22 December 1995 (aged 82) Le Coudray, France

Gymnastics career
- Discipline: Men's artistic gymnastics
- Country represented: France

Jean Robert Raymond Aubry (18 March 1913 – 22 December 1995) was a French gymnast. He competed in eight events at the 1936 Summer Olympics.
