= Jimmy Bartlett =

Canadian long-distance runner (1908–1971)

Personal information
- Full name: James Alfred Bartlett
- Born: 1 May 1908 Oshawa, Ontario, Canada
- Died: 30 July 1971 (aged 63) Bowmanville, Ontario, Canada

Sport
- Sport: Long-distance running
- Event: Marathon

Jimmy Bartlett (1 May 1908 – 30 July 1971) was a Canadian long-distance runner. He competed in the marathon at the 1936 Summer Olympics.
