= Jackie Gibson (athlete) =

South African long-distance runner

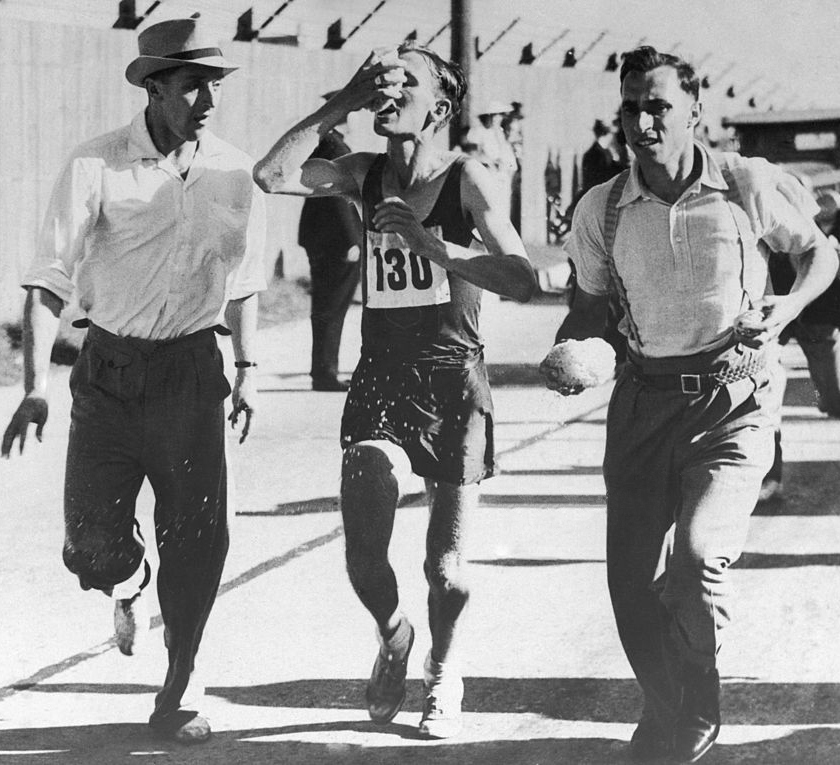
- Gibson (center) running marathon at the 1938 British Empire Games

Personal information
- Born: 31 March 1914 Johannesburg, South Africa
- Died: 15 January 1944 (aged 29) Eshowe, South Africa

Sport
- Sport: Athletics
- Event: Marathon

Achievements and titles
- Personal best: 2:30:45 (1937)
Medal record
Representing South Africa
British Empire Games
Bronze medal – third place	1938 Sydney	Marathon

Henry Alfred "Jackie" Gibson (31 March 1914 – 15 January 1944) was a South African long-distance runner. He finished eighth in the marathon at the 1936 Summer Olympics. At the 1938 Empire Games he won the bronze medal in the marathon and placed sixth in the 6 miles contest.

Gibson served in the South African Air Force where he reached the rank of Lieutenant in the 25 Squadron. He died along with the rest of the crew in an aircraft accident when their Lockheed B-34 Ventura II #6026 flew into a hilltop near Eshowe, Natal during bad weather. He was buried in the Stellawood Cemetery in Durban.

In commemoration of his success in athletics, the Jackie Gibson Memorial Marathon was inaugurated in 1946 and is the oldest marathon in Johannesburg.
