= Tamao Shiwaku =

Japanese runner (1906–1990)

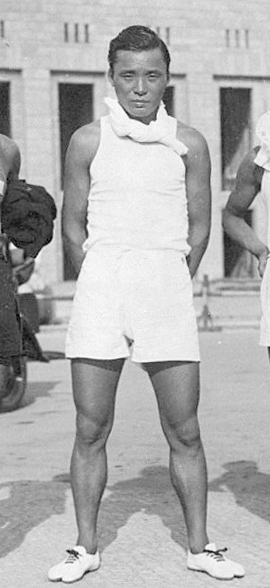
- Tamao Shiwaku at the 1936 Olympics

Personal information
- Born: May 12, 1906 Japan Sakaide, Kagawa
- Died: December 15, 1990 (aged 84) Japan Sakaide, Kagawa

Sport
- Sport: Long-distance running

Tamao Shiwaku (塩飽 玉男, May 12, 1906 – December 15, 1990) was a Japanese runner. He competed at the 1936 Olympics in the marathon but did not finish the race.

He died in Sakaide, Kagawa on December 15, 1990.
