= Helga Hellebrand-Wiedermann =

Austrian canoeist

Helga Hellebrand-Wiedermann (Vienna, 29 December 1930 – Pöttsching, 8 February 2013) was an Austrian sprint canoeist who competed in the late 1950s and early 1960s. Competing in two Summer Olympics, she earned her best finish of ninth in the K-2 500 m event at Rome in 1960.
