= Väinö Muinonen =

Finnish long-distance runner

Medal record

Men's athletics

Representing Finland

European Championships
Gold medal – first place	1938 Paris	Marathon
Silver medal – second place	1946 Oslo	Marathon

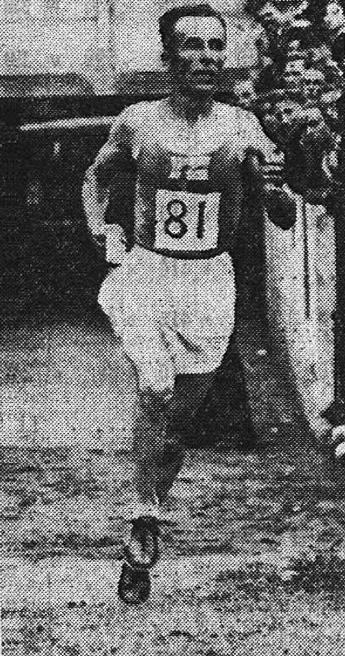
Finnish Väinö Muinonen, winner of the 1938 European Championships marathon, entering the Colombes stadium

Viktor "Väinö" Muinonen (30 December 1898, in Lappeenranta – 10 June 1978) was a Finnish long-distance runner, who competed for his native country at the 1936 Summer Olympics in Berlin, Germany.

Born in Imatra, Muinonen is best known for winning the gold medal in the men's marathon at the 1938 European Championships in Paris, France. He set his personal best of 2:33:03 in 1946, at the age of 47.
