= Daniela Walkowiak-Pilecka =

Polish canoeist

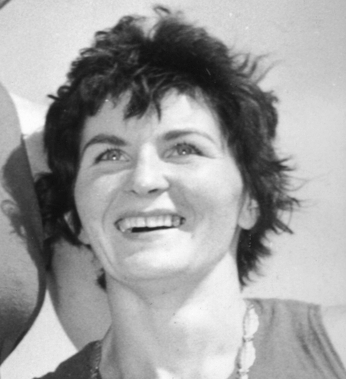
- Walkowiak-Pilecka at the 1960 Olympics

Personal information
- Born: 24 May 1935 (age 91) Łąki Wielkie, Poland
- Height: 160 cm (5 ft 3 in)
- Weight: 60 kg (132 lb)

Sport
- Sport: Canoe sprint
- Event: 500 m
- Club: Spójnia Warszawa; Zawisza Bydgoszcz
Medal record
Representing Poland
Olympic Games
Bronze medal – third place	1960 Rome	K-1 500 m

Daniela Walkowiak-Pilecka (born 24 May 1935) is a retired Polish canoe sprinter who competed in the 500 m singles and doubles at the 1956, 1960 and 1964 Olympics. She won an individual bronze medal in 1960 and placed fourth-eighth in all her other events.
