= Canoeing at the 1964 Summer Olympics – Women's K-2 500 metres =

The women's K-2 500 metres event was a pairs kayaking event conducted as part of the Canoeing at the 1964 Summer Olympics programme on Lake Sagami, Japan.

The preliminary heats were held on 20 October 1964; 10 pairs entered and were split into two heats of 5 each. The top three placers in each heat advanced to the final, while the remaining four crews were relegated to the semifinal the next day. Those four competed together, with the top three joining the initial six finalists and the last-place pair being eliminated. The final, which included 9 of the original 10 crews, was held on 22 October.

== Medalists ==
| Gold | Silver | Bronze |
| Roswitha Esser and Annemarie Zimmermann (EUA) | Francine Fox and Glorianne Perrier (USA) | Hilde Lauer and Cornelia Sideri (ROU) |

== Results ==
=== Heats ===
The 10 crews first raced in two heats on 20 October. The top three finishers from each of the heats advanced directly to the final; the remaining 4 teams were relegated to the semifinal.

Heat 1
| 1. | Birthe Hansen and Anni Werner-Hansen (DEN) | 1:58.99 | QF |
| 2. | Francine Fox and Glorianne Perrier (USA) | 1:59.69 | QF |
| 3. | Else-Marie Ljungdahl and Eva Sisth (SWE) | 2:00.16 | QF |
| 4. | Margaret Buck and Lynette Wagg (AUS) | 2:08.43 | QS |
| 5. | Hiroko Oshima and Keiko Okamoto (JPN) | 2:14.53 | QS |
Heat 2
| 1. | Roswitha Esser and Annemarie Zimmermann (EUA) | 1:56.66 | QF |
| 2. | Hilde Lauer and Cornelia Sideri (ROU) | 1:57.69 | QF |
| 3. | Nina Gruzintseva and Antonina Seredina (URS) | 1:58.81 | QF |
| 4. | Katalin Benkő and Maria Roka (HUN) | 2:02.19 | QS |
| 5. | Izabella Antonowicz and Daniela Pilecka (POL) | 2:05.86 | QS |

=== Semifinal ===
The top three finishers in the semifinal (raced on 21 October) advanced to the final. The host nation's team became the first to be eliminated.

Semifinal
| 1. | Katalin Benkő and Maria Roka (HUN) | 2:06.90 | QF |
| 2. | Izabella Antonowicz and Daniela Pilecka (POL) | 2:11.02 | QF |
| 3. | Margaret Buck and Lynette Wagg (AUS) | 2:14.61 | QF |
| 4. | Hiroko Oshima and Keiko Okamoto (JPN) | 2:18.39 |

=== Final ===
The final was held on 22 October.

| Gold | Roswitha Esser and Annemarie Zimmermann (EUA) | 1:56.95 |
| Silver | Francine Fox and Glorianne Perrier (USA) | 1:59.16 |
| Bronze | Hilde Lauer and Cornelia Sideri (ROU) | 2:00.25 |
| 4. | Nina Gruzintseva and Antonina Seredina (URS) | 2:00.69 |
| 5. | Birthe Hansen and Anni Werner-Hansen (DEN) | 2:00.88 |
| 6. | Else-Marie Ljungdahl and Eva Sisth (SWE) | 2:02.24 |
| 7. | Katalin Benkő and Maria Roka (HUN) | 2:03.67 |
| 8. | Izabella Antonowicz and Daniela Pilecka (POL) | 2:04.31 |
| 9. | Margaret Buck and Lynette Wagg (AUS) | 2:10.70 |
