= Washington Canoe Club =

- U.S. National Register of Historic Places
- D.C. Inventory of Historic Sites
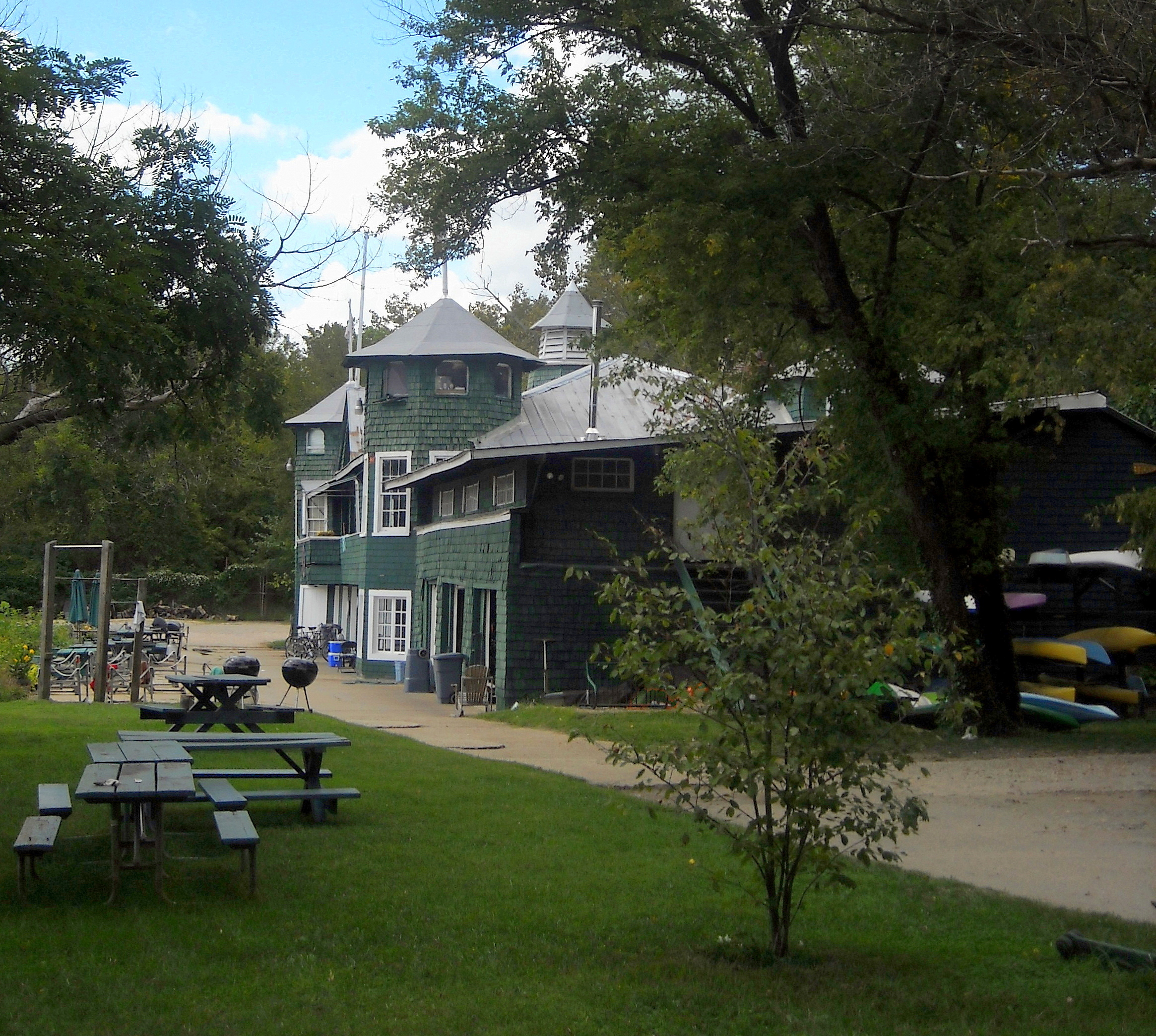
- Washington Canoe Club in 2008

- Location within Washington, D.C.
- Location: 3700 K Street, N.W., Washington, D.C.
- Coordinates: 38°54′16″N 77°4′20″W
- Built: 1904
- Architectural style: Shingle style
- NRHP reference No.: 90002151

Significant dates
- Added to NRHP: March 19, 1991
- Designated DCIHS: January 23, 1973

The Washington Canoe Club is a boat club on the Potomac River. It is located at 3700 K Street, Northwest, Washington, D.C., in the Georgetown neighborhood. It was established in 1904. The Canoe Club was listed in the National Register of Historic Places in on March 19, 1991.

== History ==
The Washington Canoe Club was originally built on pilings facing the Potomac River. During the 1960s, the Army Corps of Engineers demolished the piers of the Potomac Aqueduct Bridge. The bank under the Canoe Club became stagnant and was subsequently filled with concrete. Shortly thereafter the area north of the Canoe Club was paved. The club leased the land from the Baltimore & Ohio Railroad, and now the National Park Service.

The club has produced national champions and Olympic medalists.

== Olympic medalists ==
- Frank Havens – 1948 Silver medal; 1952 Gold medal
- Francine Fox and Glorianne Perrier – 1964 Silver medal
- Norman Bellingham – 1988 Gold medal
