= Chad Gable =

American professional wrestler (born 1986)

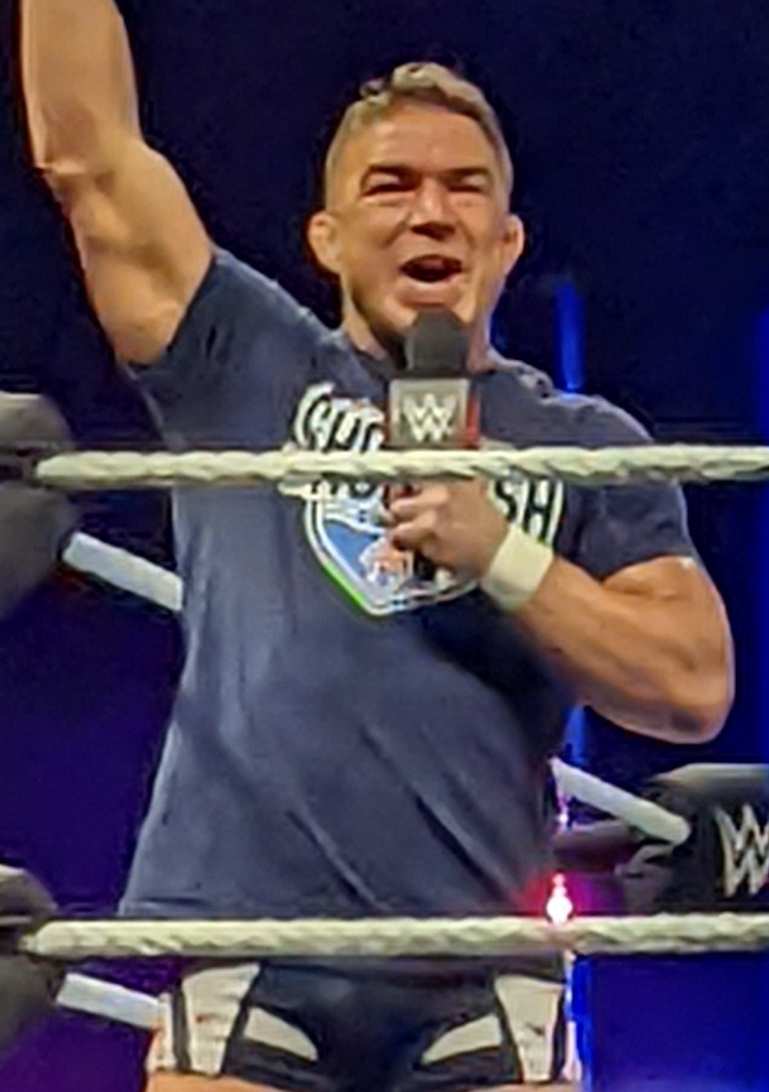
- Gable in 2022

Personal information
- Born: Charles Edward Betts; March 8, 1986 (age 40) Minneapolis, Minnesota, U.S.
- Education: Northern Michigan University; Full Sail University (MA)
- Spouse: Kristi Oliver (m. 2011)
- Children: 3

Professional wrestling career
- Ring name(s): Chas Betts; Chad Gable; El Grande Americano (I); Shorty G Shorty Gable
- Billed height: 5 ft 8 in (173 cm)
- Billed weight: 202 lb (92 kg)
- Billed from: Minneapolis, Minnesota; Gulf of Mexico; Gulf of America
- Trained by: Arik Cannon; Bill DeMott; Billy Gunn; Dusty Rhodes; Joey Mercury; Matt Bloom; Mike Quackenbush; Norman Smiley
- Debut: September 8, 2003

Charles Edward Betts (born March 8, 1986) is an American professional wrestler and former amateur wrestler. As of November 2013, he is signed to WWE, where he performs on the Raw brand under the ring name Chad Gable.

A prolific amateur wrestler who competed at the 2012 Summer Olympics in London, Betts signed with WWE in November 2013 and tested training before he was deployed to WWE's developmental branch, NXT. Working as a tag team wrestler, he won the NXT Tag Team Championship with his partner Jason Jordan as American Alpha, before being called up to the main roster in July 2016, where they won the SmackDown Tag Team Championship before disbanding in July 2017. He formed a tag team with Shelton Benjamin before being traded to Raw in the 2018 Superstar Shake-up and then forming a team with Bobby Roode, winning the Raw Tag Team Championship with him in December 2018. With this win, he became the second man (after Jordan) to have won the NXT, SmackDown, and Raw Tag Team Championships. In January 2022, Gable won the Raw Tag Team Championship for a second time with Alpha Academy tag partner, Otis.

In early 2025, he began simultaneously portraying the masked luchador El Grande Americano. Under this persona, he won his first singles championship, the WWE Speed Championship. Due to injury, Ludwig Kaiser took over the role of Americano in June 2025; Gable returned as Americano in 2026 before reverting to Chad Gable at Noche de Los Grandes. Later in 2026, he won the WWE Intercontinental Championship.

== Early life ==
Charles Edward Betts was born on March 8, 1986 in Minneapolis, Minnesota. He is a graduate of Northern Michigan University. He received his master's degree from Full Sail University in October 2021.

== Amateur wrestling career ==
Betts competed primarily in Greco-Roman wrestling throughout high school and college. He was a 2004 Minnesota high school state champion as a student at St. Michael-Albertville High School. He was coached as an amateur wrestler by Dan Chandler and Gregg Greeno.

Betts attended Northern Michigan University in Marquette, Michigan, on a scholarship specifically designed to train Olympic athletes at the U.S. Olympic Education Center. He trained for eight years pursuing his Olympic wrestling dream, being coached in Marquette by Ivan Ivanov (a prominent Greco-Roman wrestling coach and inventor of the Suples Bulgarian Bag).

He defeated Jordan Holm 2-0 in the final of the 2012 U.S. Olympic Trials in the 84 kg category. He progressed to the 2012 Summer Olympics, where he competed in the Greco-Roman style 84kg event. He defeated Keitani Graham from the Federated States of Micronesia in the qualification round. He was eliminated from the competition in the next round by Pablo Shorey of Cuba, losing 3–0.

== Professional wrestling career ==
=== Pre-WWE ===
Under the ring name "Chase Hasty", Betts started wrestling in a homemade 14-foot backyard ring built by his father. He was an active member of online message boards and traded wrestling tapes from Japan, Mexico, and Europe.

In 2003, he entered and won a local wrestling promotion’s $50 WWE Tough Enough-style contest. This win earned him free professional wrestling training. Betts had his first official independent pro wrestling match in September 2003 in Wisconsin. He then stepped away from pro wrestling during his senior year high school amateur wrestling season and subsequent Olympic training.

=== WWE ===
==== Discovery ====
Betts was scouted by Gerald Brisco around the 2012 Olympic era. He later secured a formal WWE tryout in May 2013 at Florida Championship Wrestling (FCW) in Tampa, Florida, participating in the final tryout class before the facility transitioned to the WWE Performance Center.

==== Training (2013–2015) ====
In November 2013, Betts signed a contract with the professional wrestling promotion WWE. He was assigned to the WWE Performance Center in Orlando, Florida, and adopted the ring name Chad Gable (a nod to Olympian Dan Gable). He made his in-ring debut at an NXT house show in Cocoa Beach, Florida on September 5, 2014, defeating Troy McClain. He had a match against then debuting Braun Strowman at an NXT Live event in Jacksonville, Florida on December 19, 2014, in a losing effort. He made his television debut on the January 8, 2015, episode of NXT, losing to Tyler Breeze.

==== American Alpha (2015–2017) ====
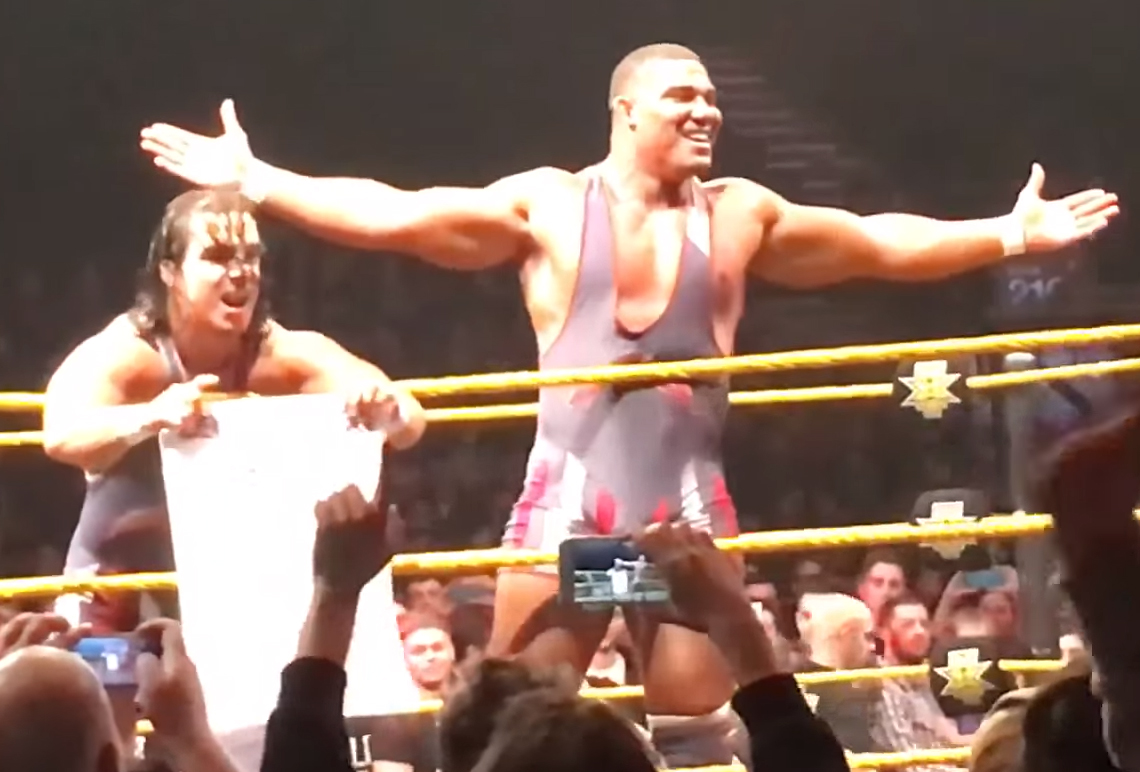
Gable (left) with Jason Jordan as American Alpha in March 2016

Starting in May 2015, NXT newcomer Chad Gable began a storyline with Jason Jordan, in which he tried to convince Jordan to form a new partnership, following the dissolution of Jordan's team with Tye Dillinger. After nearly two months of coaxing, Jordan finally agreed to a tag team match with Gable as his teammate. On the July 15 episode of NXT, Jordan and Gable were successful in their official debut together against the team of Elias Samson and Steve Cutler. On September 2, Jordan and Gable competed in the first round of the Dusty Rhodes Tag Team Classic tournament, beating the team of Neville and Solomon Crowe. After defeating the Hype Bros, they were eliminated from the tournament by the team of Baron Corbin and Rhyno. Originally villains, the duo turned into fan favorites even in defeat, when they showed fighting spirit and resiliency throughout the match. At NXT TakeOver: London, Gable and Jordan were successful in a fatal four-way tag team match, which was taped for the December 23 episode of NXT. During the January 8 tapings of NXT, the team of Jordan and Gable began using the name American Alpha.

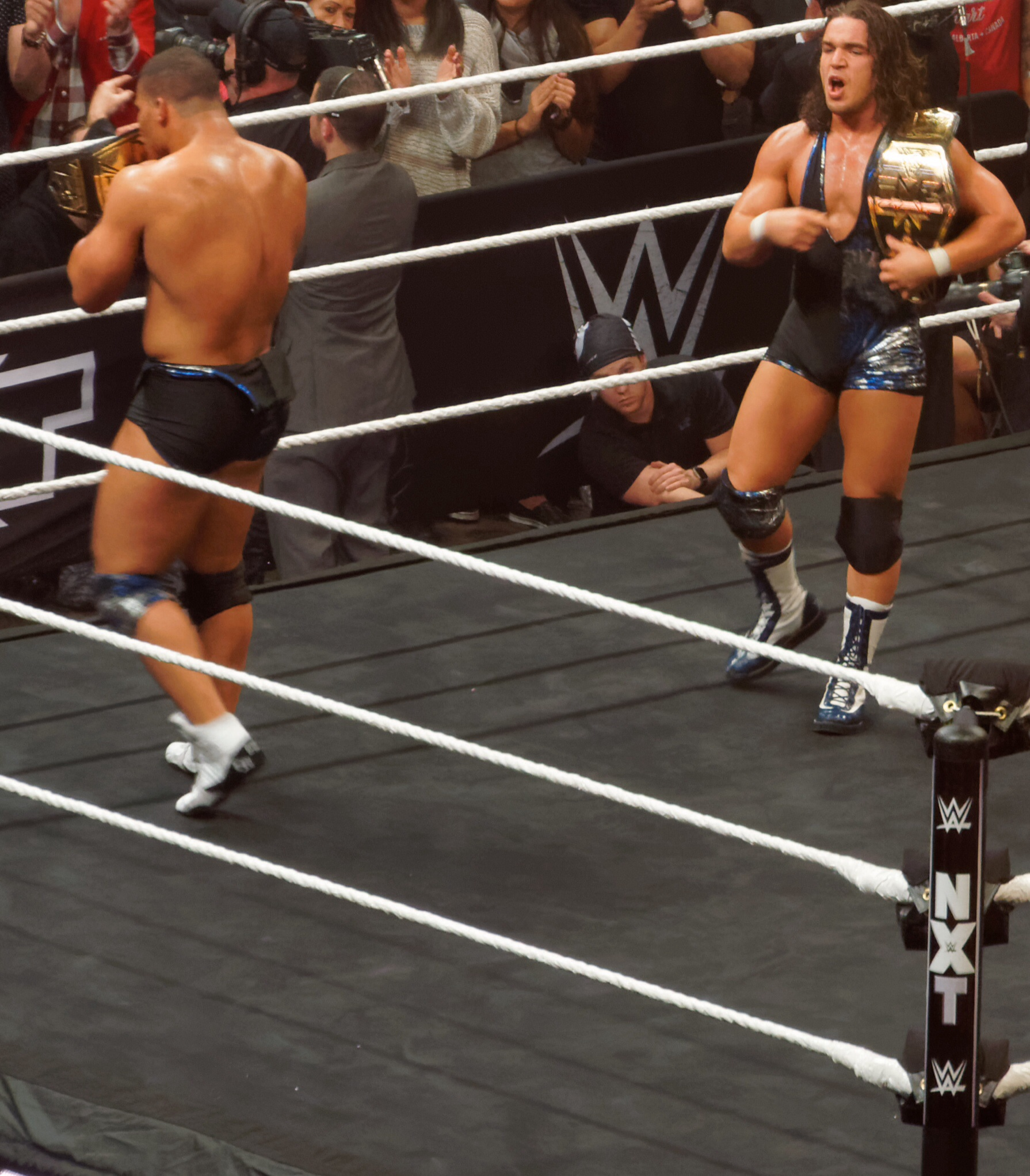
American Alpha after winning the NXT Tag Team Championship at the NXT TakeOver: Dallas event in April 2016

American Alpha faced off with the Vaudevillains on the March 16 episode of NXT in a number one contender's match where they emerged victorious, earning them an NXT Tag Team Championship match against Dash Wilder and Scott Dawson, now called "The Revival", at NXT TakeOver: Dallas. The pair won the NXT Tag Team Championship at the event. On June 8 at NXT TakeOver: The End, American Alpha lost the title back to The Revival, ending their reign at 68 days. After the match, they were assaulted by the debuting Authors of Pain (Akam and Rezar), who were managed by the legendary manager, Paul Ellering. The pair subsequently failed to win back the NXT Tag Team Championship after being defeated by the Revival in a two out of three falls match on the July 6 episode of NXT, before wrestling their final match on the brand on July 20, where they were defeated by the Authors of Pain.

As a result of the 2016 WWE Draft on July 19, the team was drafted to the SmackDown brand, being their first tag team pick overall. On the August 2 episode of SmackDown, American Alpha made their debut, defeating the Vaudevillains. The pair teamed with The Usos and the Hype Bros at SummerSlam to defeat the team of The Ascension, Breezango (Tyler Breeze and Fandango), and The Vaudevillains. The pair then entered an eight-team tournament which would determine the inaugural SmackDown Tag Team Champions, defeating Breezango in the first round to advance to the semi-finals where they faced The Usos. Despite defeating The Usos quickly on the September 6 episode of SmackDown, Gable's knee was kayfabe injured during a post-match assault when the Usos turned heel, rendering American Alpha unable to compete at Backlash and undoing their attempts to become the inaugural champions.

They returned on the September 20 episode to face the Usos in a number one contender's match to establish who would face inaugural Smackdown Tag Team Champions Heath Slater and Rhyno at No Mercy, where they were defeated due to Gable's injury, marking their first loss on the main roster. At the event, they instead teamed with the Hype Bros to face the Ascension and the Vaudevillians where they were successful. On the November 1 episode of SmackDown, American Alpha defeated the Spirit Squad to qualify for Team SmackDown for the 10-on-10 Survivor Series tag team elimination match at Survivor Series. Team SmackDown was defeated by Team Raw at the event, with American Alpha being eliminated by Luke Gallows and Karl Anderson after eliminating The Shining Stars.

On the December 27 episode of SmackDown Live, they defeated Randy Orton and Luke Harper of The Wyatt Family, Heath Slater and Rhyno, and The Usos in a four corners elimination match to become the new SmackDown Tag Team Champions, celebrating with their families afterward. After defeating The Wyatt Family (Orton and Harper) in a rematch to retain their title on January 10, the pair went on to defend their title in a tag team turmoil match at Elimination Chamber successfully against The Ascension, Usos, Vaudevillians, Breezango, and Heath Slater and Rhyno, entering fourth and eliminating the Usos and Ascension, despite an attack by the Usos after their elimination, continuing their feud. On the March 21 episode of SmackDown Live, American Alpha lost the SmackDown Tag Team Championship to The Usos after suffering a non-title match loss to the pair the prior week. After making their WrestleMania debut at WrestleMania 33 where both were unsuccessful in winning the André the Giant Memorial Battle Royal, they failed in their championship rematch with the Usos, being attacked by Primo and Epico afterward, who defeated them the following week.

On the June 20 episode of SmackDown, Chad Gable answered the United States Championship Open Challenge put forward by champion Kevin Owens where he was ultimately unsuccessful. In a July interview, Gable spoke about going solo, citing his will to fight against top competition. On the July 17 episode of Raw, Jason Jordan was moved to the Raw brand. This effectively disbanded the team.

==== Tag team specialist (2017–2019) ====
On the August 22 episode of SmackDown Live, General Manager Daniel Bryan announced that he had signed a returning Shelton Benjamin to team up with Gable, therefore creating a tag team between the two. The following week on SmackDown Live, Gable and Benjamin picked up a win over The Ascension in their first match as a tag team; this was also Benjamin's first WWE match since 2010. On the September 12 episode of SmackDown Live, Benjamin and Gable defeated The Hype Bros, before defeating them again in a rematch at Hell in a Cell. On the October 10 episode of SmackDown Live, Benjamin and Gable defeated The Hype Bros, The Ascension, and Breezango in a fatal four-way match to become the number one contenders for The Usos's SmackDown Tag Team Championship. On the November 7 episode of SmackDown Live, they received their title opportunity and won the match by count-out, however, the Usos retained their championships as titles do not change hands by count out unless stipulated. After trading victories with The Usos the following weeks, they competed in a fatal four-way match for the SmackDown Tag Team Championships against defending champions The Usos, The New Day, and the team of Rusev and Aiden English at Clash of Champions, but failed to win the title. Two days later on SmackDown Live, Gable and Benjamin defeated The Usos in a non-title match. They had quietly turned heel during the period of time where they had been challenging The Usos for the SmackDown Tag Team Championships by showing more villainous tactics.

On the January 2, 2018, episode of SmackDown Live, they defeated The New Day and Rusev and English in a triple threat match to earn another shot at the SmackDown Tag Team titles, which they lost the following week after pinning the wrong twin for the apparent victory and then losing the impromptu rematch. The following week on SmackDown Live, the duo confirmed their heel turn when they insulted the referee of their title match the week before, demoralized the fans, and accused General Manager Daniel Bryan of being biased, which resulted in Bryan booking them for a two out of three falls match against The Usos at the Royal Rumble, where they lost in two straight falls. That following week, Gable and Benjamin interrupted an episode of Fashion Files, and traded insults with Breezango, challenging them to a match, Gable and Benjamin eventually won the match. The next week, Gable and Benjamin mocked The New Day and faced them in a losing effort. On March 27 episode of SmackDown Live, he accompanied Benjamin to a match against Shinsuke Nakamura in a losing effort, after which, they attacked WWE Champion AJ Styles before being fought off by Nakamura.

On April 16, Gable was moved to Raw as part of the 2018 WWE Superstar Shake-Up, thus disbanding with Benjamin. On the April 23 episode of Raw, Gable turned face after he took offense at Jinder Mahal insulting Raw General Manager Kurt Angle. Gable defeated Mahal on his first match on the brand. On the September 3 episode of Raw, Gable formed a tag team with Bobby Roode and went on to defeat The Ascension. At Survivor Series, they became captains for Team Raw, but lost to Team SmackDown in the 10-on-10 Survivor Series tag team elimination match. During this time, Gable changed his attire to trunks and began wearing a robe in his entrance, mirroring Roode's look. On the December 10 episode of Raw, Gable and Roode defeated AOP and their manager Drake Maverick in a three-on-two handicap to capture the Raw Tag Team Championship. With the win, Gable became the second man (after his former partner Jason Jordan) to have won the NXT, SmackDown, and Raw Tag Team Championships.

At the Royal Rumble kick-off show, Gable and Roode defeated Rezar and Scott Dawson in a non-title match. The match stipulation stated that if Rezar and Dawson were to win, their respective teams (AOP and The Revival) would both receive tag team championship matches. The Revival eventually received their title match on the February 11 episode of Raw, in which Gable and Roode lost the championship. Gable and Roode failed to regain the championship from The Revival in a triple threat tag-team match also involving Ricochet and Aleister Black at Fastlane on March 11.

==== Shorty G (2019–2020) ====
During the 2019 WWE Superstar Shake-up, Gable was drafted to SmackDown, while Roode remained on Raw, effectively ending the team. In August, Gable was announced as one of the competitors in the King of the Ring tournament. On the August 27 episode of SmackDown Live, Gable defeated Shelton Benjamin in the first round of the tournament. He lost in the finals against Baron Corbin. At Hell in a Cell on October 6, Gable defeated Corbin, with the announcer announcing him as "Shorty Gable" (upon Corbin's request, making fun of his height), which officially became his ring name. Later, his name was truncated to "Shorty G".

At Crown Jewel on October 31, Shorty G competed in a 10-man tag team match as a part of Team Hogan, defeating Team Flair. At Survivor Series, Shorty G was a part of Team SmackDown; he was eliminated by Kevin Owens, but his team won the match. After this event, Shorty G continued to wrestle in the tag team division with Mustafa Ali as his partner. On the January 3, 2020, episode of SmackDown, Sheamus returned from injury, appearing to save Shorty G from an attack by The Revival, but then delivered a Brogue Kick to him. Sheamus then defeated Shorty G at the Royal Rumble, and on the January 31 episode of SmackDown. After three months away from television, Shorty G made his return on the May 29 episode of SmackDown in a 10-man battle royal for a spot in the Intercontinental Championship tournament but was eliminated by Cesaro. Later that night, Shorty G defeated Cesaro. On the July 31 episode of SmackDown, Shorty G turned heel by attacking Matt Riddle from behind and aligning himself with King Corbin, however, the alliance storyline was dropped. In 2024, Gable described the Shorty G character as the lowest point of his career.

==== Alpha Academy (2020–2024) ====
On the October 23 episode of SmackDown, after losing to Lars Sullivan, he announced that he had quit being "Shorty G" and reverted to the ring name Chad Gable. On the November 13 episode of SmackDown, Gable turned face when he opened the Alpha Academy and attempted to recruit Otis as his client. The team made their debut on the December 11 episode of SmackDown, losing to Cesaro and Shinsuke Nakamura. On the February 19 episode of SmackDown, Gable ordered Otis to attack Rey Mysterio after their tag team match, reverting back to a heel.

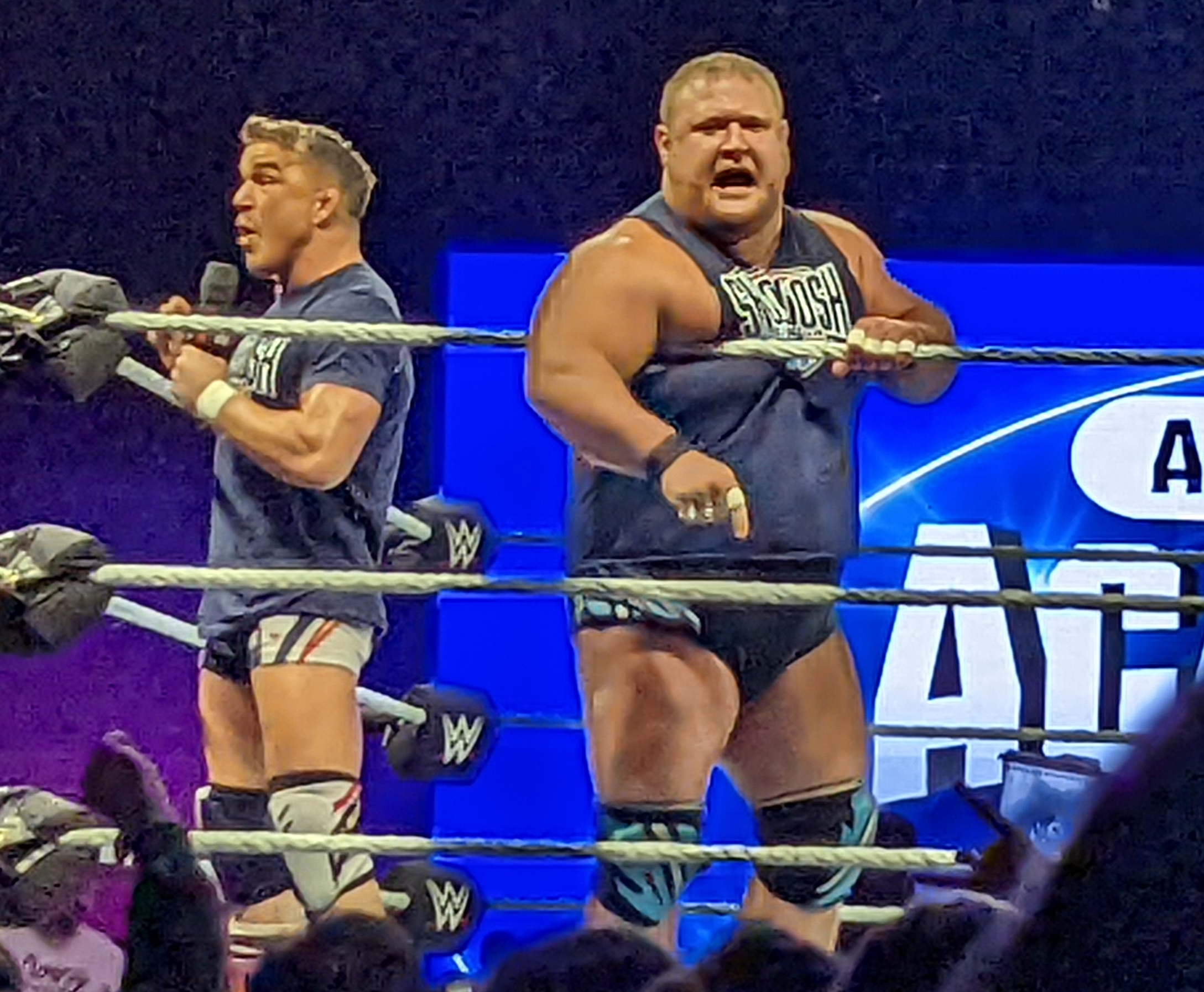
Gable (left) with Otis as Alpha Academy in March 2022

As part of the 2021 Draft, both Gable and Otis were drafted to the Raw brand. On the January 10, 2022 episode of Raw, Alpha Academy defeated RK-Bro (Randy Orton and Riddle) to win the Raw Tag Team Championship. They dropped the titles back to RK-Bro on the March 7 episode of Raw, ending their reign at 55 days. On Night 2 of WrestleMania 38 on April 3, Alpha Academy failed to regain the titles from RK-Bro in a triple threat match also involving The Street Profits.

On the March 13, 2023 episode of Raw, Gable found Otis backstage taking part in a photo shoot with Maximum Male Models (ma.çé and mån.sôör, managed by Maxxine Dupri). Otis then decided to leave with Maximum Male Models instead of Gable, which began a series of segments between Gable and Dupri, who both wanted Otis to be on their respective teams. Dupri officially sided with the Alpha Academy on the May 15 episode of Raw when she cheered on Otis and Gable eliminating ma.çé and mån.sôör in the Intercontinental Championship number one contenders' battle royal. During this time, both Gable and Otis turned face after increasing crowd support, and Dupri trained with Alpha Academy. Dupri made her in-ring debut on the July 3 episode of Raw in a mixed six-person tag team match with Gable and Otis, defeating The Viking Raiders (Erik, Ivar and Valhalla) when Dupri pinned Valhalla. On the July 10 episode of Raw, Alpha Academy held a graduation ceremony for Dupri. At the end of the ceremony, Gable presented Dupri with her own Alpha Academy letterman's jacket. As Dupri was about to put on the jacket, The Viking Raiders appeared on the ramp to distract the team, and Valhalla attacked Dupri from behind and stole her jacket. On the following episode of Raw, Gable and Otis lost to Erik and Ivar in a "Viking Rules" match, but Dupri managed to take back her jacket.

Gable subsequently feuded with Intercontinental Champion Gunther and won a fatal four-way match on the August 7 episode of Raw to become the number one contender. Two weeks later on Raw, Gable won his title match against Gunther by countout, ending Gunther’s undefeated singles streak on the main roster; however, as championships do not change hands by countout unless otherwise stipulated, Gunther remained champion. On the September 4 episode of Raw, Gable failed to win the Intercontinental Championship from Gunther.

During the build to WrestleMania XL, Gable was involved in a storyline where he trained Sami Zayn for his Intercontinental Championship match against Gunther. After Zayn won the title on Night 1 of the event, Zayn gave Gable a title shot on the April 15 episode of Raw, but Gable failed to win the title. After the match, Gable attacked Zayn as he was celebrating with his wife at ringside, turning heel in the process. The following week, Gable said that he had spent too much time training "losers" such as Zayn and his stablemates, declaring that the stable's focus would now be on Gable winning the Intercontinental Championship. On the April 29 episode of Raw, Zayn defended his title against Bronson Reed, winning the match by disqualification after Gable attacked him. The following week, Zayn attacked Gable during his match with Reed, leading to a triple threat match at King and Queen of the Ring on May 25, where Zayn retained his title. At Clash at the Castle: Scotland on June 15, Gable failed to win the title from Zayn after Otis and Dupri refused to interfere on Gable's behalf, ending their feud. Two nights later on Raw, Otis, Dupri and Akira Tozawa walked out on Gable, who in turn left Alpha Academy. Later that night, he was attacked by the debuting Wyatt Sicks stable.

==== American Made and El Grande Americano (2024–2026) ====
On the June 24 episode of Raw, Gable defeated Braun Strowman and Reed to qualify for the Money in the Bank ladder match at the titular event on July 6, which was won by Drew McIntyre. After continuously being hounded by The Wyatt Sicks, Gable called out Bo Dallas, who was walking to the ring when The Creed Brothers (Brutus Creed and Julius Creed) attacked him from behind, aligning themselves with Gable in the process. They continued to attack Dallas in the ring before being fended off by the rest of The Wyatt Sicks. On the August 5 episode of Raw, Gable teamed with The Creed Brothers for the first time as American Made, losing to The Wyatt Sicks (Erick Rowan, Dexter Lumis and Joe Gacy) in their in-ring debut. On the September 9 episode of Raw, The Wyatt Sicks defeated American Made in a Street Fight, ending their feud.

After losing to a debuting Penta on the January 13, 2025 episode of Raw, Gable started a comedic storyline in which he underwent a "quest" to discover the ways of lucha libre. In March, he began to portray a traditional luchador under the name El Grande Americano, a character that denied being the same person as Gable and garnered some negative reception from WWE's Mexican audience. On April 19, at Night 1 of WrestleMania 41, Gable, as El Grande Americano, defeated Rey Fenix, who replaced an injured Rey Mysterio. Also as El Grande Americano, he defeated Dragon Lee to win his first singles championship, the WWE Speed Championship, during the May 5 tapings of Speed (aired May 7). On June 7, Gable challenged El Hijo del Vikingo for the AAA Mega Championship at the WWE and Lucha Libre Asistencia Asesoría y Administración (AAA) event Worlds Collide in a losing effort. Later that night, Gable, as Americano, participated in the Money in the Bank ladder match, which was won by Seth Rollins. In the same month, it was reported that Gable sustained a legitimate shoulder injury, leaving him out of action, and the role of Americano was taken over by Ludwig Kaiser.

At the Royal Rumble on January 31, 2026, Gable made his return from injury as the original El Grande Americano and entered the match at #13 eliminating his successor El Grande Americano (II) before being eliminated by Trick Williams. On the February 2 episode of Raw, he appeared to help the referee Chad Patton catch El Grande Americano (II) trying to sneak a metal plate into his mask costing him the match against Je'Von Evans, turning the Original El Grande Americano face on Raw. Later that same week, however, Gable appeared on AAA on Fox, attacking El Grande Americano (II) and re-establishing himself as a heel on the AAA brand in Mexico. On April 11, Gable challenged El Grande Americano (II) to a máscara contra máscara match at Noche de Los Grandes on May 30, 2026, which he lost and was forced to unmask ending their feud. Dave Meltzer of the Wrestling Observer Newsletter rated the match 5 3/4 stars, making it the highest-rated match produced by WWE in history.

==== Intercontinental Champion (2026–present) ====
When Gable came back to WWE unmasked, he sought forgiveness from several luchadores, including Fenix, Penta, Mysterio, and Lee. Following Penta's successful defense of the Intercontinental Championship against Mysterio, Ethan Page and Rusev launched an attack, with Lee unsuccessfully attempting to aid Penta and Mysterio. After Rusev tore off Mysterio's mask, Gable saved the luchadores and returned Mysterio's mask, turning face in the process. On the July 13 episode of Raw, Gable was victorious in a seven-man gauntlet match to earn a Intercontinental Championship match against Penta at SummerSlam. At Night 2 of SummerSlam on August 2 in his hometown of Minneapolis, Gable defeated Penta to win the Intercontinental Championship. On the November 2 episode of Raw, Gable lost the title to Ethan Page, ending his reign at 92 days.

== Personal life ==
Betts married Kristi Oliver, whom he had been dating for nine years, on June 19, 2011. The couple have three children together.

He operates a highly curated private home gym named "The Shackk", named by his longtime tag partner Otis, who trained there daily with Gable. Betts works with strength and conditioning coach Jay Ferruggia, focusing on joint-friendly machine movements, lower training volume, and strict nutritional consistency.

Betts is a member of the Comanche Nation.

== Other media ==
Betts, as Chad Gable, made his video game debut as a playable character in WWE 2K17 and has since appeared in WWE 2K18, WWE 2K19, WWE 2K20, WWE 2K Battlegrounds, WWE 2K22, WWE 2K23, WWE 2K24, WWE 2K25, and WWE 2K26. Betts's El Grande Americano persona was added as DLC for WWE 2K25 and returned, as "Original El Grande Americano", in WWE 2K26.

== Luchas de Apuestas record ==
Winner (wager)	Loser (wager)	Location	Event	Date	Notes
El Grande Americano (mask)	"The Original" El Grande Americano (mask)	Monterrey, Nuevo León, Mexico	Noche de Los Grandes	May 30, 2026	This was a No Disqualification match.

== Championships and accomplishments ==
=== Amateur wrestling ===
- High school
  - Minnesota State Wrestling Champion (2004)
  - Minnesota State Wrestling 4th Place (2003)
- International Medals
  - World University Games Silver medal (2006)
  - Pan-American Championships Gold medal (2012)
  - Gedza International Silver medal (2012)
  - Pan-American Olympic Qualifier Silver medal (2012)
  - Granma Cup Bronze medal (2012)
  - Dave Schultz Memorial International Gold medal (2012)
- Olympic Games
  - U.S. Olympic Trials Champion (2012)

=== Professional wrestling ===
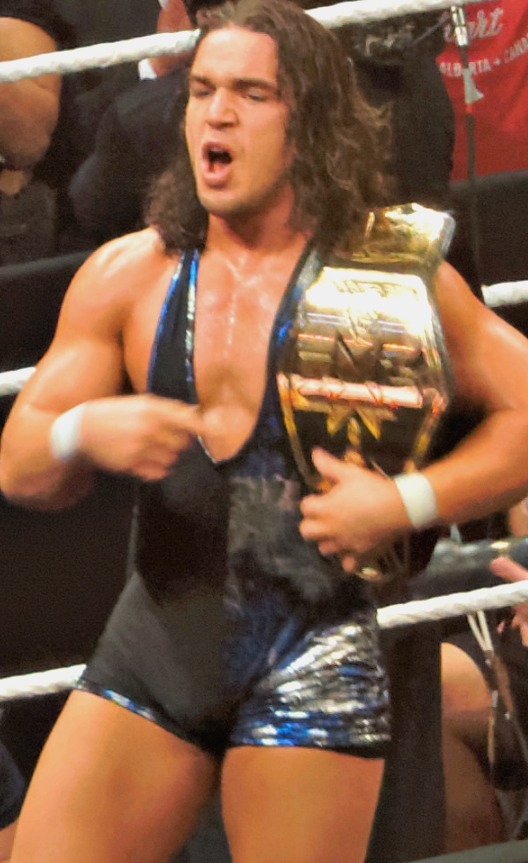
Gable is a former one-time NXT Tag Team Champion.

- Pro Wrestling Battleground
  - PWB Battleground Championship (1 time)
- Pro Wrestling Illustrated
  - Ranked No. 83 of the top 500 singles wrestlers in the PWI 500 in 2019
- Rolling Stone
  - Most Promising Youngster of the Year (2017)
- Wrestling Observer Newsletter
  - Rookie of the Year (2015)
  - Most Underrated (2019, 2023)
  - Worst Gimmick (2019)
- WWE
  - WWE Intercontinental Championship (1 time)
  - WWE Raw Tag Team Championship (2 times) – with Bobby Roode (1) and Otis (1)
  - WWE SmackDown Tag Team Championship (1 time) – with Jason Jordan
  - NXT Tag Team Championship (1 time) – with Jason Jordan
  - WWE Speed Championship (1 time) (Note: as El Grande Americano.)
  - WWE Speed Championship #1 Contender Tournament (2 times)
    - January 15–February 1, 2025
    - April 18–May 7, 2025
