= Canoeing at the 1964 Summer Olympics – Women's K-1 500 metres =

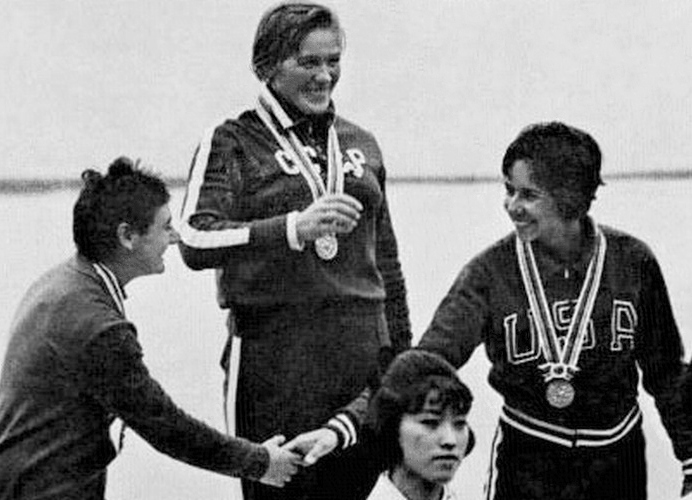
Left-right: Lauer, Khvedosiuk (Pinayeva), Jones 1964.jpg

The women's K-1 500 metres event was an individual kayaking event conducted as part of the Canoeing at the 1964 Summer Olympics programme on Lake Sagami, Japan.

The preliminary heats were held on 20 October 1964; 13 kayakers entered and were split into two heats of 7 and 6. The top three placers in each heat advanced to the semifinal, while the remaining 7 competitors were relegated to the semifinal held the next day. All 7 competed in the same semifinal, with the top 3 placers joining the 6 winners of the heats in the final. The final was held on 22 October.

== Medalists ==
Gold	Silver	Bronze
Lyudmila Khvedosiuk (URS)	Hilde Lauer (ROU)	Marcia Jones (USA)

== Results ==
=== Heats ===
The 13 competitors first raced in two heats on 20 October. The top three finishers from each of the heats advanced directly to the final; the rest competed in the semifinal the next day.

Heat 1
1.	Hilde Lauer (ROU)	2:10.91	QF
2.	Elke Felten (EUA)	2:11.94	QF
3.	Hanneliese Spitz (AUT)	2:12.14	QF
4.	Zdenka Hradilova (TCH)	2:13.56	QS
5.	Maria Roka (HUN)	2:13.74	QS
6.	Marianne Tucker (GBR)	2:14.37	QS
7.	Margaret Buck (AUS)	2:31.91	QS
Heat 2
1.	Lyudmila Khvedosiuk (URS)	2:10.38	QF
2.	Marcia Jones (USA)	2:11.50	QF
3.	Else-Marie Ljungdahl (SWE)	2:12.82	QF
4.	Nikolina Ruseva (BUL)	2:13.26	QS
5.	Daniela Pilecka (POL)	2:13.38	QS
6.	Birthe Hansen (DEN)	2:14.02	QS

=== Semifinal ===
The top three finishers in the semifinal (raced on 21 October) advanced to the final. All other kayakers were eliminated.

Semifinal
1.	Maria Roka (HUN)	2:14.63	QF
2.	Daniela Pilecka (POL)	2:14.71	QF
3.	Birthe Hansen (DEN)	2:15.28	QF
4.	Nikolina Ruseva (BUL)	2:15.49
5.	Marianne Tucker (GBR)	2:16.56
6.	Zdenka Hradilova (TCH)	2:16.63
7.	Margaret Buck (AUS)	2:21.00

=== Final ===
The final was held on 22 October.

Gold	Lyudmila Khvedosiuk (URS)	2:12.87
Silver	Hilde Lauer (ROU)	2:15.35
Bronze	Marcia Jones (USA)	2:15.68
4.	Elke Felten (EUA)	2:15.94
5.	Else-Marie Ljungdahl (SWE)	2:16.00
6.	Hanneliese Spitz (AUT)	2:16.11
7.	Daniela Pilecka (POL)	2:17.52
8.	Maria Roka (HUN)	2:17.85
9.	Birthe Hansen (DEN)	2:18.21
