= Keiko Okamoto =

Japanese sprint canoer (born 1945)

Keiko Okamoto (岡本 敬子, Okamoto Keiko; born June 13, 1945) is a Japanese sprint canoer who competed in the mid-1960s. At the 1964 Summer Olympics, she was eliminated in the semifinals of the K-2 500 m event.
