= Hiroko Oshima =

Japanese sprint canoer (born 1943)

Hiroko Oshima (大島 裕子, Ōshima Hiroko; born November 3, 1943) is a Japanese sprint canoer who competed in the mid-1960s. At the 1964 Summer Olympics, she was eliminated in the semifinals of the K-2 500 m event.
