= Hilde Lauer =

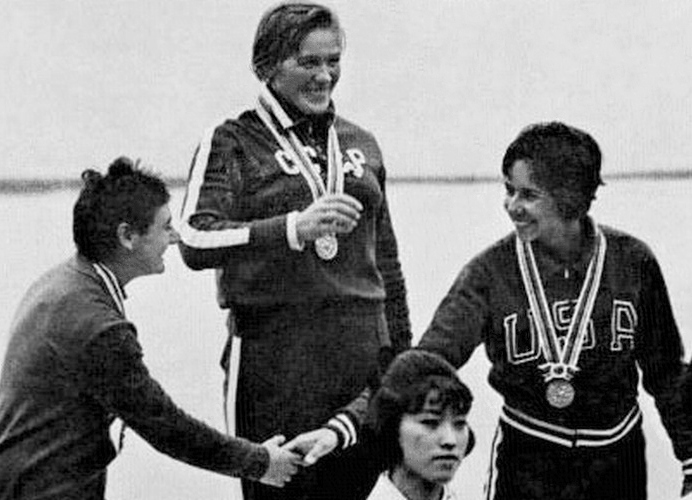
- Lauer (left) at the 1964 Olympics

Personal information
- Born: 24 March 1943 (age 83) Orţişoara, Romania
- Height: 160 cm (5 ft 3 in)
- Weight: 63 kg (139 lb)

Sport
- Sport: Canoe sprint
- Club: Steaua Bucuresti
Medal record
Representing Romania
Olympic Games
Silver medal – second place	1964 Tokyo	K-1 500 m
Bronze medal – third place	1964 Tokyo	K-2 500 m

Hilde Lauer (later Tătaru, born 24 March 1943) is a Romanian retired canoe sprinter. She won two medals at the 1964 Olympics with a silver in the K-1 500 m and a bronze in the K-2 500 m event. Domestically she won ten national titles between 1961 and 1969. In 1970 she immigrated to Germany.
