= Lynette Wagg =

Australian sprint canoer (born 1939)

Personal information
- Nationality: Australian
- Born: 5 June 1939 (age 85)

Sport
- Country: Australia
- Sport: Sprint canoe
- Event: K-2 500 m

Achievements and titles
- Olympic finals: 9th (1964)
- Updated on 23 February 2017

Lynette Wagg (born 5 June 1939) is an Australian canoe sprinter who competed in the mid-1960s. At the 1964 Summer Olympics, she finished ninth in the K-2 500 m event.
