= Rusev =

Rusev (Bulgarian: Русев pronounced [ˈrusɛf]), female version Ruseva (Bulgarian: Русева pronounced [ˈrusɛvɐ]) is a Bulgarian language surname derived from the first name Rusi and it may refer to:

- Rusev (wrestler) (formerly known as Miro), ring name of Bulgarian professional wrestler Miroslav Barnyashev.
- Angel Rusev (footballer), Bulgarian footballer
- Desislav Rusev, Bulgarian footballer
- Dilma Rousseff, 36th President of Brazil
- Georgi Rusev, Bulgarian actor
- Ivan Rusev (footballer), Bulgarian footballer
- Ivan Rusev (badminton), Bulgarian badminton player
- Nikolay Rusev, Bulgarian footballer
- Nikolina Ruseva, Bulgarian sprint canoer
- Svetlin Rusev, Bulgarian artist
- Yanko Rusev, Bulgarian weightlifter
