= Birthe Hansen =

Danish sprint canoer (born 1944)

Birthe Hansen (born 8 June 1944) is a Danish sprint canoeist who competed in the mid-1960s. At the 1964 Summer Olympics in Tokyo, she finished fifth in the K-2 500 m event and ninth in the K-1 500 m event.
