= Eva Sisth =

Swedish canoeist (1940–2019)

Eva Sisth (October 16, 1940 – October 7, 2019) was a Swedish sprint canoer who competed in the mid-1960s. At the 1964 Summer Olympics, she finished sixth in the K-2 500 m event.
