= Cornelia Sideri =

Romanian sprint canoer

Medal record

Women's canoe sprint

Representing Romania

Olympic Games
Bronze medal – third place	1964 Tokyo	K-2 500 m

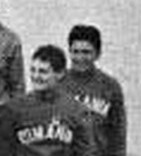
Tokyo 1964: Hilde Lauer and Cornelia Sideri, K-2 500 m

Cornelia Sideri (29 December 1938 – 11 November 2017) was a Romanian canoe sprinter who competed in the mid-1960s. She won a bronze medal in the K-2 500 m event at the 1964 Summer Olympics in Tokyo.
