= Katalin Benkő =

Hungarian canoeist (1941–2023)

Personal information
- National team: Hungary
- Born: 12 May 1941 Budapest, Hungary
- Died: 16 March 2023 (aged 81) Budapest, Hungary
Medal record
Women's canoe sprint
World Championships
| Bronze medal – third place | 1966 East Berlin | K-2 500 m |

Katalin Benkő (12 May 1941 – 16 March 2023) was a Hungarian sprint canoeist who competed in the mid to late 1960s. She won a bronze medal in the K-2 500 m event at the 1966 ICF Canoe Sprint World Championships in East Berlin.

Benkő also finished seventh in the K-2 500 m event at the 1964 Summer Olympics in Tokyo.

Benkő died in Budapest on 16 March 2023, at the age of 81.
