= Aqueduct Bridge (Potomac River) =

Bridge between Georgetown, Washington, D.C., and Rosslyn, Virginia

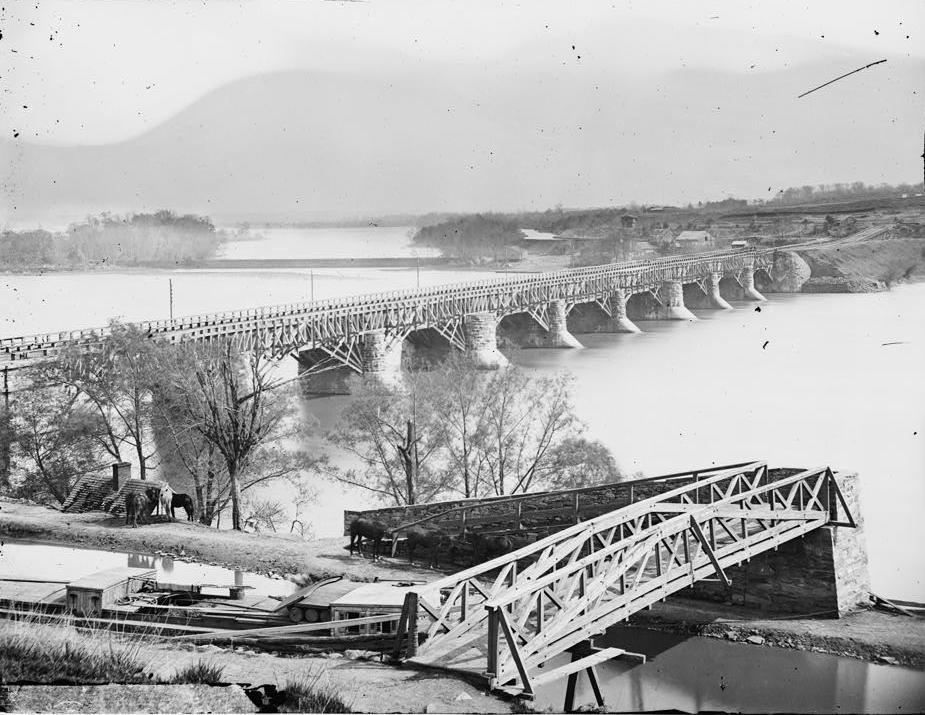
- First Aqueduct Bridge between 1860 and 1865
- Coordinates: 38°54′15″N 77°04′14″W
- Carried: Cargo-carrying boats
- Crossed: Potomac River
- Locale: Georgetown, Washington, D.C., U.S.
- Other name: Alexandria Aqueduct
- Named for: The Alexandria Canal Aqueduct
- Heritage status: Historic American Engineering Record
- Followed by: Key Bridge

Characteristics
- Material: Wood
- Width: 110 ft (34 m)
- Height: 30 ft (9.1 m)
- No. of spans: 9

History
- Designer: Brevet Major William Turnbull, Superintending Topographical Engineer of the construction of the Potomac Aqueduct at Georgetown, D. C., 1832‑43
- Engineering design by: United States Army Corps of Topographical Engineers
- Construction start: 1833
- Construction end: 1843
- Construction cost: $1,150,000
- Opened: 1843
- Rebuilt: 1868, 1888
- Closed: 1923
- Demolished: 1933

Location
- Interactive map of Aqueduct Bridge

The Aqueduct Bridge, also called the Alexandria Aqueduct, was a bridge that carried traffic between the Georgetown neighborhood of Washington, D.C. and Rosslyn, Virginia. The bridge existed from 1843 to 1923.

It was built to transport cargo-carrying boats on the Chesapeake and Ohio Canal in Georgetown across the Potomac River to the Alexandria Canal. The same eight piers supported two bridges: a wooden canal bridge and an iron truss bridge carrying a roadway and an electric trolley line. The canal was later topped with a wooden roadway bridge. The bridge was closed in 1923 after the construction of the nearby Key Bridge, and demolished in 1933.

One arched stone abutment on the Georgetown (north) end survives; it is overseen by the National Park Service as an historic site.

== History ==
=== First Canal Bridge ===
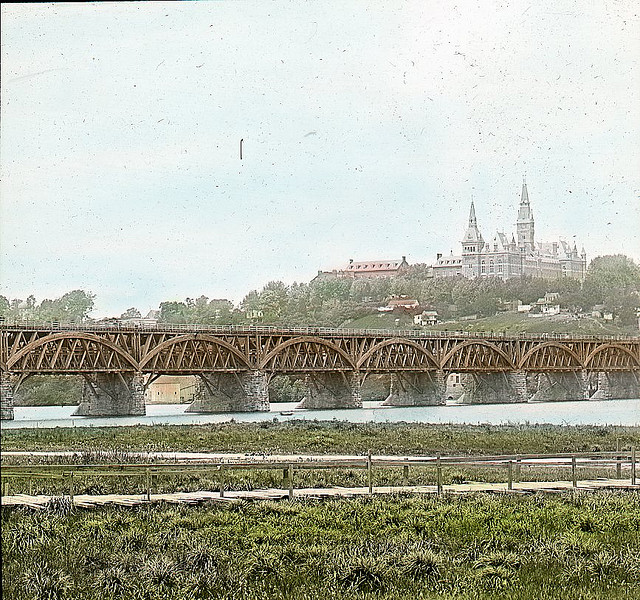
Second Aqueduct Bridge after addition of superstructure and roadway. Note the Howe trusses and arches added for strength.

In 1830, merchants from Alexandria, Virginia, which was still part of the District of Columbia at the time, proposed linking their city to Georgetown to capitalize on the new Chesapeake and Ohio Canal. Congress granted a charter to the Alexandria Canal Company in 1830, and construction soon began on the Aqueduct Bridge that would carry canal boats across the Potomac River and downriver on the south side without unloading in Georgetown.

The bridge was designed by Major William Turnbull. It was originally designed to be a stone bridge with 9 arches, but due to limited funding only the piers and abutments were built of stone and it was spanned by a wooden truss bridge. Construction of the bridge and Alexandria Canal began in 1833, and both were completed in 1843. To withstand Potomac ice floes, the piers were made of gneiss, with icebreakers made of granite. The water-filled bridge was a weatherproofed-timber, queen-post truss (elsewhere described as a Burr Truss) construction. The bridge was 110 feet (33.5 m) wide across the top. It had eight piers, each set on riverbottom bedrock and 7 feet (2.1 m) wide at the top. The third and sixth piers were 16 feet (4.9 m) wide at the top. Each pier was designed so that its top was 30 feet (9.1 m) above the mean high water level. A narrow carriageway ran alongside the bridge. The

During the American Civil War, the canal was drained to make a roadway for military troops.

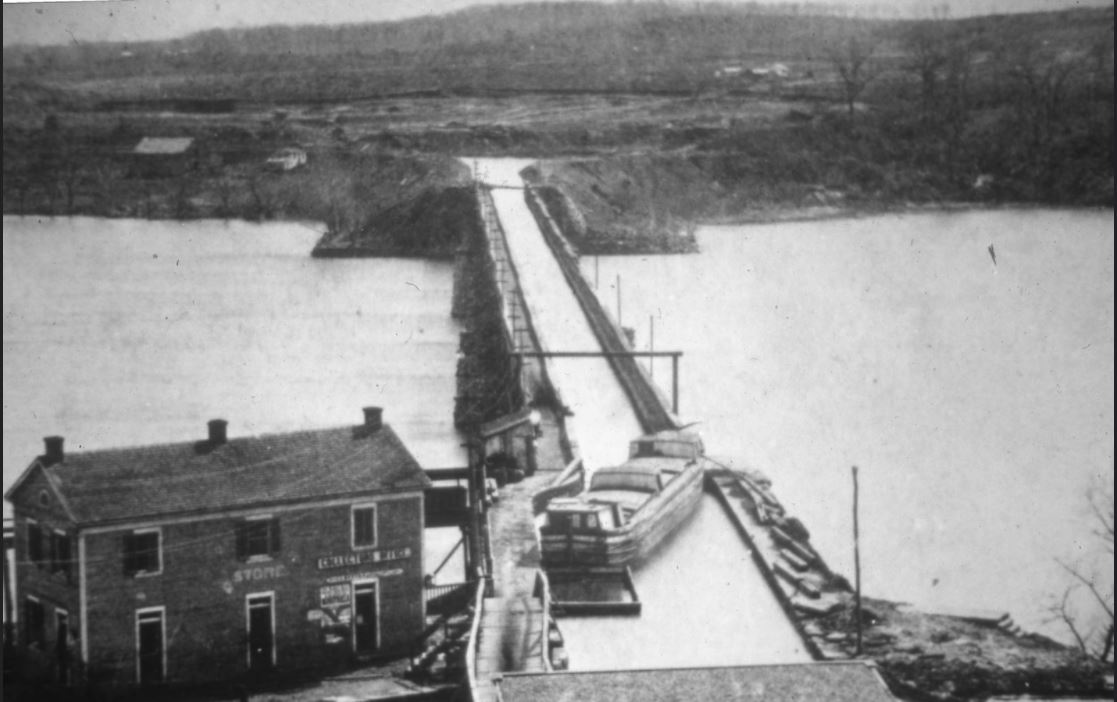
View of the Potomac Aqueduct Bridge from Georgetown into Rosslyn, Virginia

In 1866, the Alexandria Canal Company leased the bridge for 99 years to three local businessmen. It reopened for a few months in 1867, but the existing wooden superstructure had so badly decayed that it was torn down and replaced with Howe trusses.

=== Second Canal Bridge ===
The new canal bridge opened on May 30, 1868 and soon after it did they began to design and have authorized the construction of a bridge over the canal, on the same piers, that could hold a wagonway and a railroad line. They received permission for the addition in late September and started work by mid-November 1868. A wooden floor was placed atop the Howe trusses, and wooden trestles built on both ends to provide approaches to the bridge. The toll bridge over the canal opened on January 12, 1869.

To support this construction, the lessees were authorized to charge a toll. Wooden arches were later added to strengthen the Howe trusses. The tolls from the addition inhibited trade between Georgetown and Virginia, thus benefiting Alexandrian businessmen who retained Virginian trade.

=== The Free Bridge ===
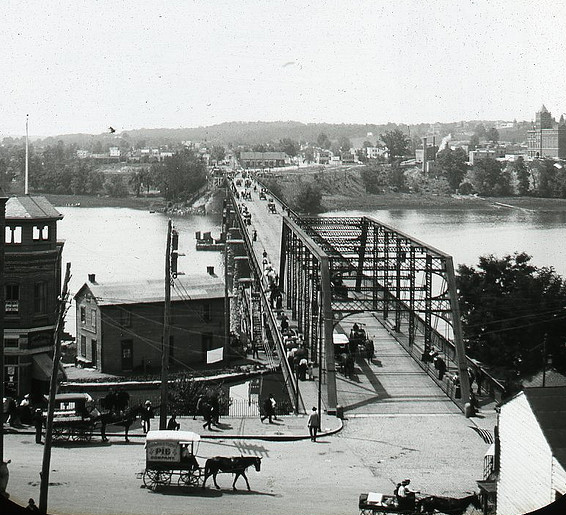
Aqueduct Bridge from Georgetown, ca. 1900

In 1882, legislation was introduced in Congress to purchase the Aqueduct Bridge and open it to the public. That bill did not pass, but a new one introduced in January 1884 did. At issue, however, was who would bear the cost of buying the bridge. Congress initially proposed that the District of Columbia shoulder the entire cost, but the city did not have the funds. Citizens in Virginia demanded that Congress pick up the cost, arguing this was an interstate bridge and therefore a national concern. Congress passed the legislation, and appropriated $240,000 to purchase the bridge. The Alexandria Canal Company sold the bridge's piers for $85,000 and its deck for $50,000, and the deed was conveyed to the federal government on August 15, 1884. Almost immediately, a dispute broke out among the canal company's shareholders as to the distribution of the funds, which suspended the transfer of deed.

The safety of the bridge was quickly called into question. In December 1885, just a year after the bridge was purchased, the United States Army Corps of Engineers conducted a study that found the wooden bridge so unsafe that it should be removed. Again, cost considerations came to the fore. Legislation was introduced in Congress in May 1886 to have a new bridge built, with the D.C. government picking up half the cost. A D.C. engineering study of the bridge was conducted in September 1886 to again determine the bridge's safety. This report for the bridge so unsafe that it recommended immediate closure. The District government did so on October 5, 1886.

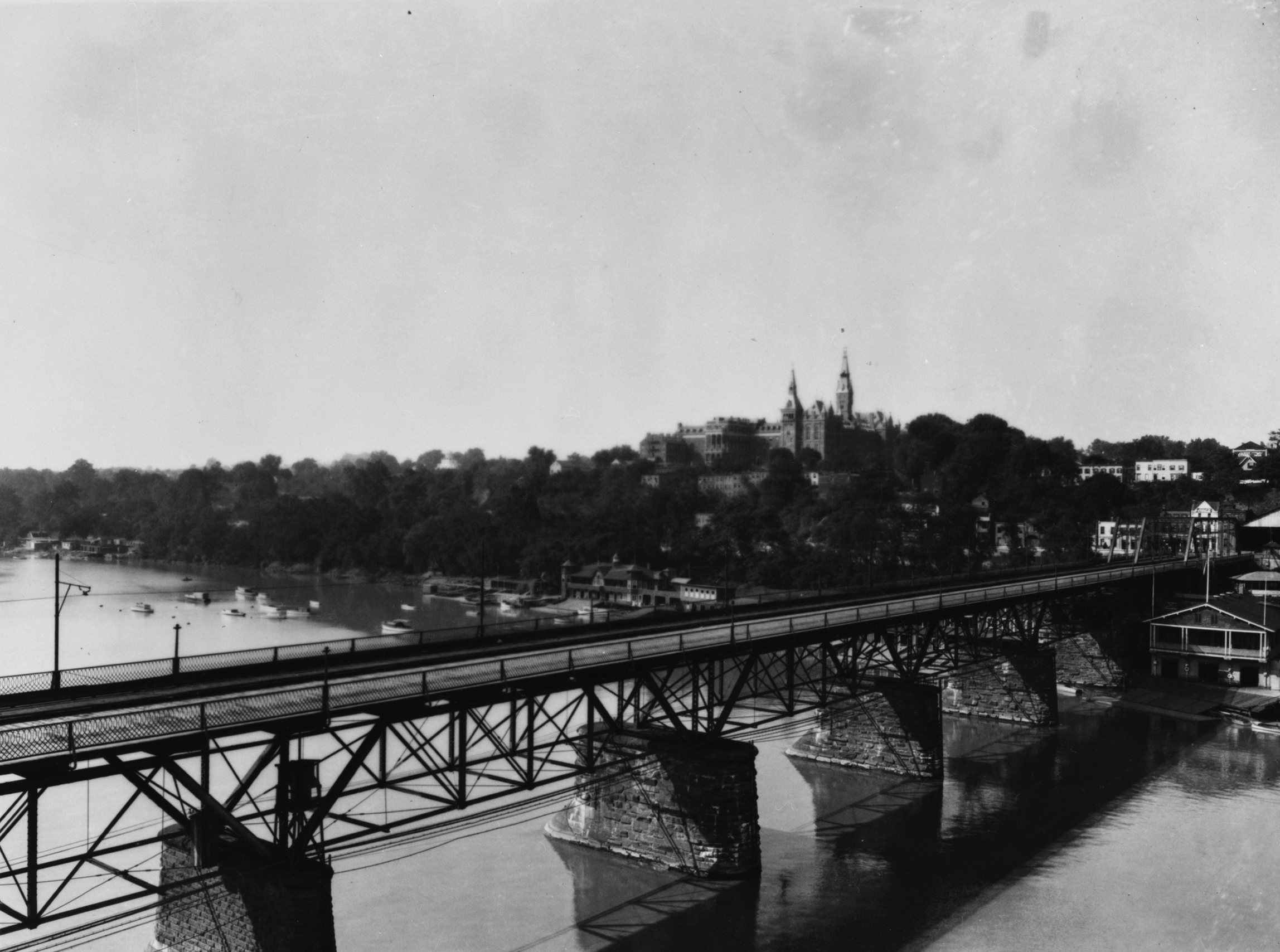
Second Aqueduct Bridge, some time between 1924 and 1933.

On October 20, 1886, the canal company shareholders finally decided how to divide up the proceeds from their sale of the bridge. The District government then asked the Secretary of War (who supervised the Corps of Engineers) whether the federal government intended to repair the bridge or build a new one. But issues concerning the sale still plagued the bridge. Although a new deed of transfer was prepared in mid-November 1886, the Alexandria Canal Company sued the federal government within weeks, seeking to receive the full sale price all at once rather than in installments. Another Corps engineering report on the bridge was made in January 1887. With the bridge again found to be unsafe to open, the federal government sued the canal company. The deed of sale, the government said, required the company to maintain a bridge that is open to travel for 20 years. This condition had not been met, and the government sought $84,500 in reimbursements to cover construction of a new deck.

Meanwhile, the Corps of Engineers reported in January 1887 that a new bridge could be constructed for $105,000 (the sum of money left over from the 1884 appropriation). With this money already in hand, no new legislation was needed. Bids for construction of the new bridge were received in March 1887, and a contract awarded to the Mt. Vernon Bridge Company. Work began in August. But extensive delays plagued the bridge. One reason for the delay was the need to obtain a new right-of-way from the Chesapeake and Ohio Canal, which the bridge would cross. Suit for the right-of-way was filed in December 1887, and the Chesapeake and Ohio Canal agreed to provide it (pending an appraisal) in January 1888. Meanwhile, the contractor proved inefficient, delaying the opening until at least January 1888. A month later, about 600 feet (183 m) of substructure had been laid, and 75 feet (23 m) of superstructure. The bridge was informally opened in early March and formally opened, with an extensive parade and celebration, on April 11, 1888.

In 1889, the northern arch in the Washington abutment was enlarged so that the Georgetown Branch of the Baltimore and Ohio Railroad could pass underneath. One of the piers was replaced in 1900.

In 1906, the Great Falls and Old Dominion Railroad (GF&OD) began to operate a single-track electric trolley line on a cantilever structure that the railroad had constructed on the bridge's west (upstream) side. In 1912, the GF&OD became the Great Falls Division of the new Washington and Old Dominion Railway.

== Building Key Bridge ==
Proposals were made to replace Aqueduct Bridge as early as 1901. But these proposals were delayed when the McMillan Plan was issued in 1902. Congress approved the construction of a wooden superstructure that extended outward from the upstream side of the bridge's deck to carry electric trolleys between Georgetown and Rosslyn in 1902. Construction began in May 1903, and involved reconstruction of one of the bridge's piers. Built by the Great Falls and Old Dominion Railroad, trolleys of the railroad and its successor, the Washington and Old Dominion Railway, traversed the bridge until its closure in 1923.

Ice jams were a routine hazard on the Potomac River into the 1960s. Although the jams often stuck against the bridge, it weathered them well until 1908. Ice damaged some of the bridge's piers, requiring reconstruction of Pier No. 1 in the summer. Engineers discovered that many of the bridge's piers had been undermined by water, and rush repairs were made. But the aging structure continued to suffer damage, and by September 1912 the bridge was leaning dangerously to the west. Fears that the bridge would give way during the spring ice jams worsened. The bridge piers were extensively repaired again in 1913.

=== The Carlin bill ===
In March 1914, Representative Charles Creighton Carlin of Virginia sponsored legislation to replace Aqueduct Bridge with a new, $1 million structure. The Commissioners of the District of Columbia (the city's appointed government) approved of the new bridge in June. Controversy over the new bridge immediately broke out. Senator Claude A. Swanson, chairman of the Senate Committee on Public Works, wanted the new bridge built about 3,000 feet (910 m) downstream at the mouth of Rock Creek (at about 30th Street NW), where it would cross Analostan Island and the Potomac River to Rosslyn. Georgetown merchants strongly opposed this plan. There were some in Congress who wanted to repair the existing bridge, but a study by the United States Army Corps of Engineers in August 1914 showed that the existing structure was inadequate for the amount of traffic and too unstable to be saved. Secretary of War Lindley Miller Garrison, who oversaw the Corps, agreed that a new bridge was necessary in December. Rep. William C. Adamson, chairman of the House Committee on Public Works, challenged Swanson and declared that the new bridge should be placed where the old one was.

The Carlin bill began moving through the House in January 1915. But House members balked at the cost. Garrison tried to break the deadlock on January 9 by issuing a report that declared the existing bridge unsafe, and requesting that the new one be built in the same location. The D.C. Commissioners said the location of the bridge was up to them, and the Corps warned that not only could the existing bridge not be enlarged but agreed with Garrison that it was structurally unsound. Swanson changed his mind, and agreed in January 1916 that the new bridge should be built on the existing site. Garrison endorsed the Carlin bill on January 27. On February 3, 1916, vehicular traffic over Aqueduct Bridge was limited by the city to a single automobile at a time due to its dangerous nature. The House passed legislation appropriating $1.175 million for construction of a new bridge on March 6. D.C. commissioners held hearings on the bridge site in late March, and approved the site in early April. The Senate passed some minor amendments to the House bill, and after some legislative discussions and a conference committee, the Carlin bill passed Congress on May 2, 1916. President Woodrow Wilson signed the legislation on May 19.

=== Demolition of Aqueduct Bridge ===
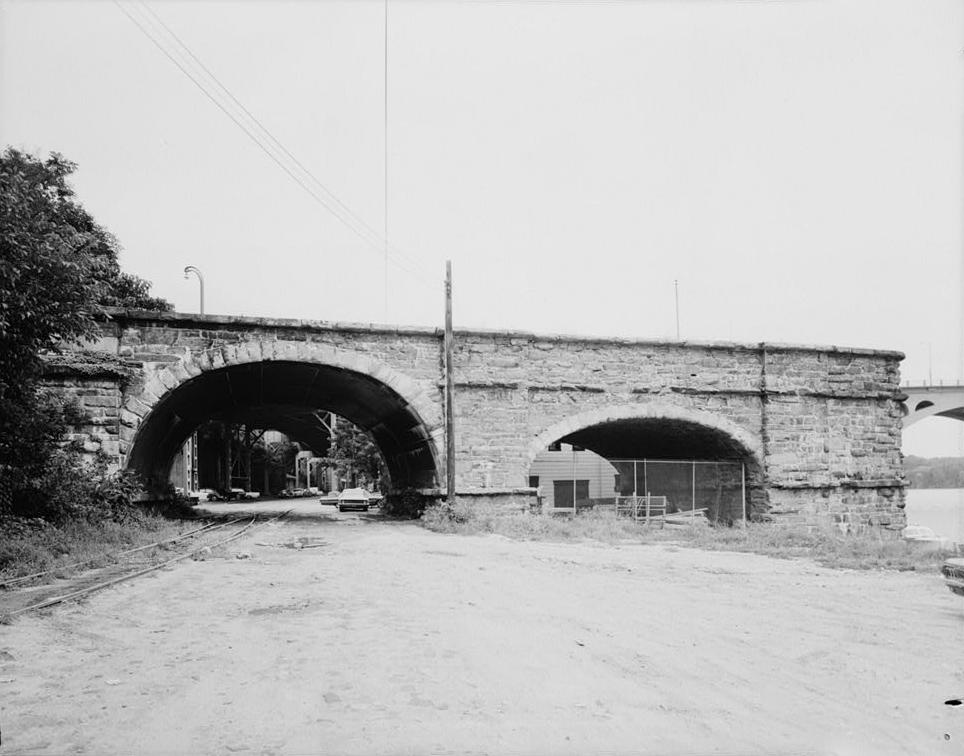
Side view of second Aqueduct Bridge abutment, with Water Street and Whitehurst Freeway visible through the arch.

On June 1, 1916, the Army Corps of Engineers named the new bridge "Francis Scott Key Bridge," in honor of the man who had written the lyrics to the Star Spangled Banner, whose home sat in between the new "Key" bridge and the aqueduct bridge. Originally a water bridge connecting directly into the C&O canal, its final raised roadbed extending to "M" street had brought the old bridge even closer (roughly 150 feet) to the mansion where Francis Scott Key had lived. Plans for the new bridge began to be drawn in early summer, 1916 and were nearly complete by September. When repairs on Aqueduct Bridge were made in October 1916 to prepare the structure for winter, the Corps discovered even more deterioration than before.

In January 1917, the Corps of Engineers found that inflation in the price of construction materials made it necessary to ask for $300,000 more in funding from Congress. Congress balked at paying. But citizen pressure and the danger of collapse due to ice flows in the spring convinced Congress to pay the money. Construction contracts were drawn up in late February, and excavation work on the D.C. abutments began in March. The first coffer dam for construction of the piers was sunk in May 1918, and, in July 1921, the Aqueduct Bridge was ordered to be closed. The new $2.35 million Key Bridge opened on January 17, 1923, whereupon the Aqueduct Bridge was closed to traffic.

Although Georgetown citizens pressed to keep the Aqueduct Bridge open for recreation, demolition began in December 1933. The superstructure and most of the above-water portions of its piers were removed in 1933. The bases of the piers were retained to protect the Key Bridge's piers from ice floe damage.

By mid-century, the piers had come to be viewed by recreational boaters (particularly rowers from nearby Georgetown University) as an obstacle to enjoyment of the river and a navigational hazard. Army engineers and Rep. Joel Broyhill refused to remove the piers, citing their value to protecting Key Bridge and the cost of their removal. But in August 1962, these groups agreed that seven of the piers would be removed, with one remaining as a historical marker. Dismantling of the piers began on September 11, 1962. The pilings were blasted out to a depth of 12 feet (3.7 m) below the waterline.

== Remnants ==
The Aqueduct Bridge's Washington abutment and a remnant of the bridge's Virginia abutment still survive. Both are located a short distance west (upstream) of the Key Bridge. The southern arch of the Washington abutment shelters rowing shells belonging to members of the Potomac Boat Club. Between the abutments, the preserved pier remains in place near the river's Virginia shoreline.

After the B&O's Georgetown Branch was abandoned in 1985, Water Street NW was extended west through the passageway to the Washington Canoe Club. The empty lot before the canoe club had previously been occupied by Dempsey's Canoe Livery. The rest of the Georgetown Branch right-of-way is now occupied by the Capital Crescent Trail.

A coalition of Georgetown business groups and residents have joined with Georgetown University to advocate the construction of a gondola that would cross the river along the former path of the Aqueduct Bridge. Conceptual images show that a pole supporting the gondola's cables would rise from the bridge's remaining pier.

== Images ==
=== First bridge ===
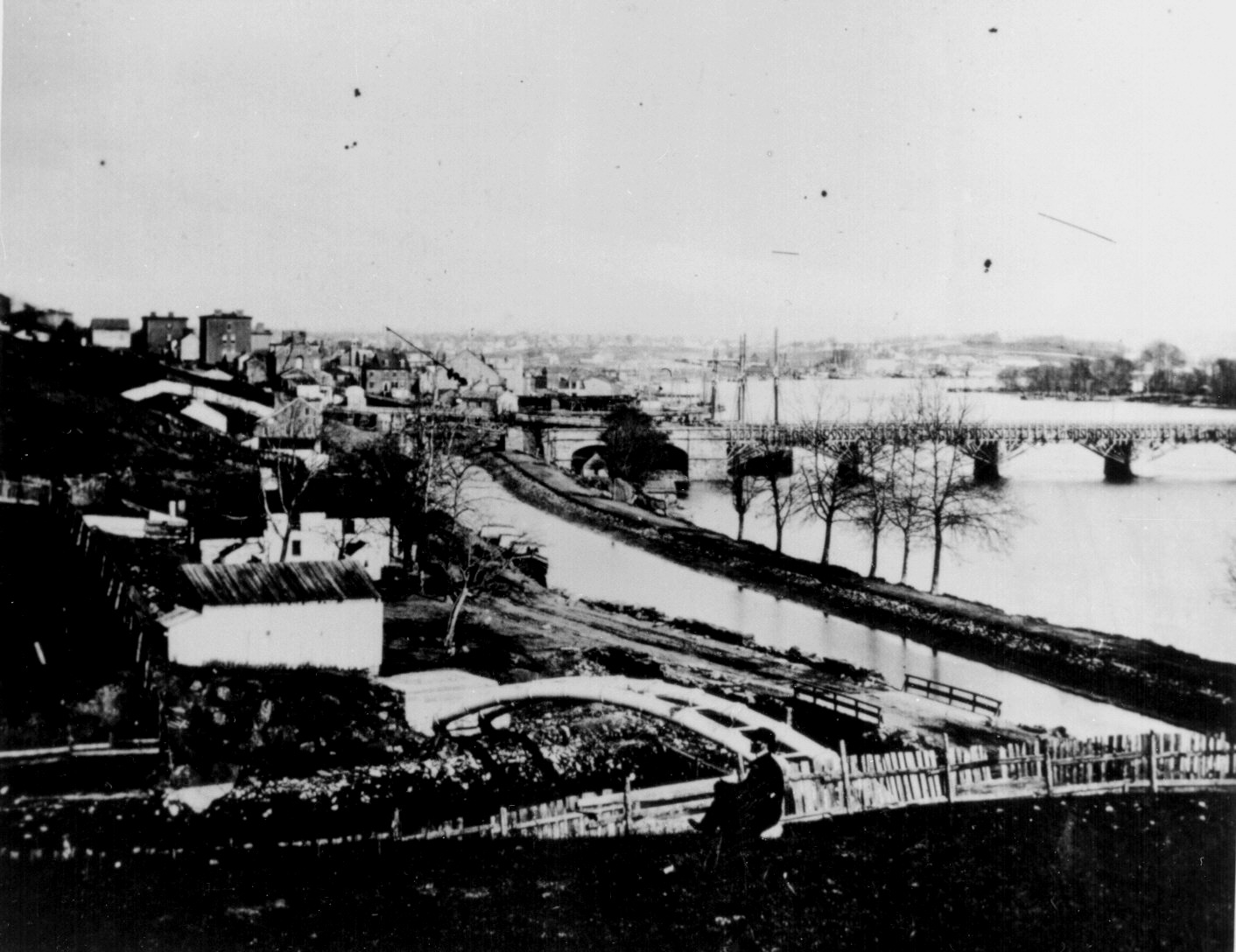
Canal bridge

=== First bridge after superstructure built ===
Photograph of first bridge with new superstructure

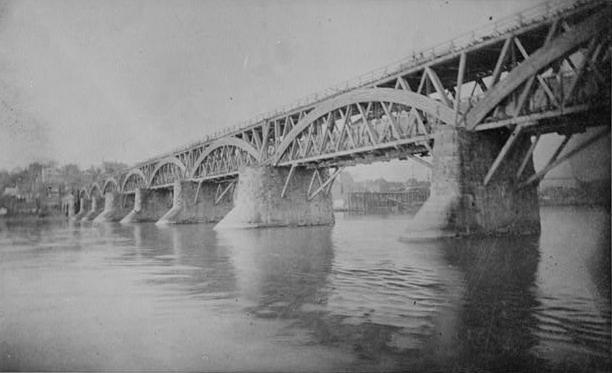
Close-up photo of first bridge with new superstructure

=== Second bridge ===
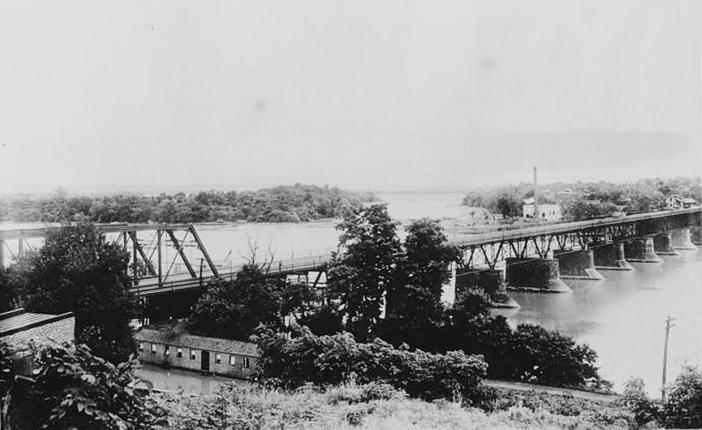
Downstream view (towards Roosevelt Island) of second bridge

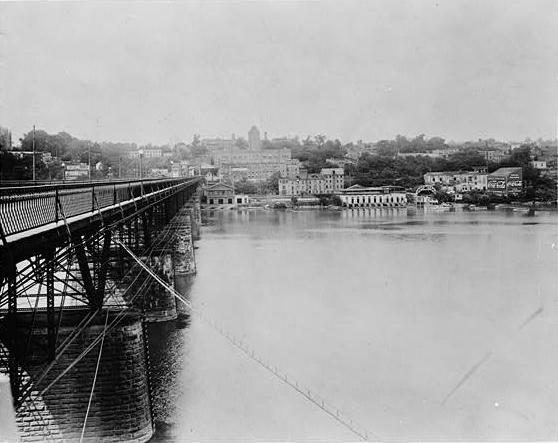
View of second bridge from Virginia towards Georgetown

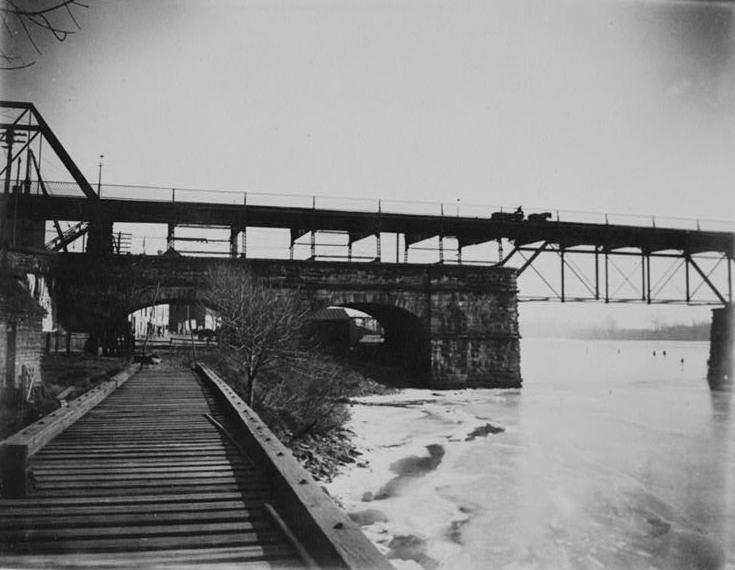
Side view of second bridge abutment, before enlargement to allow the Georgetown Branch to pass beneath

=== Remnants ===
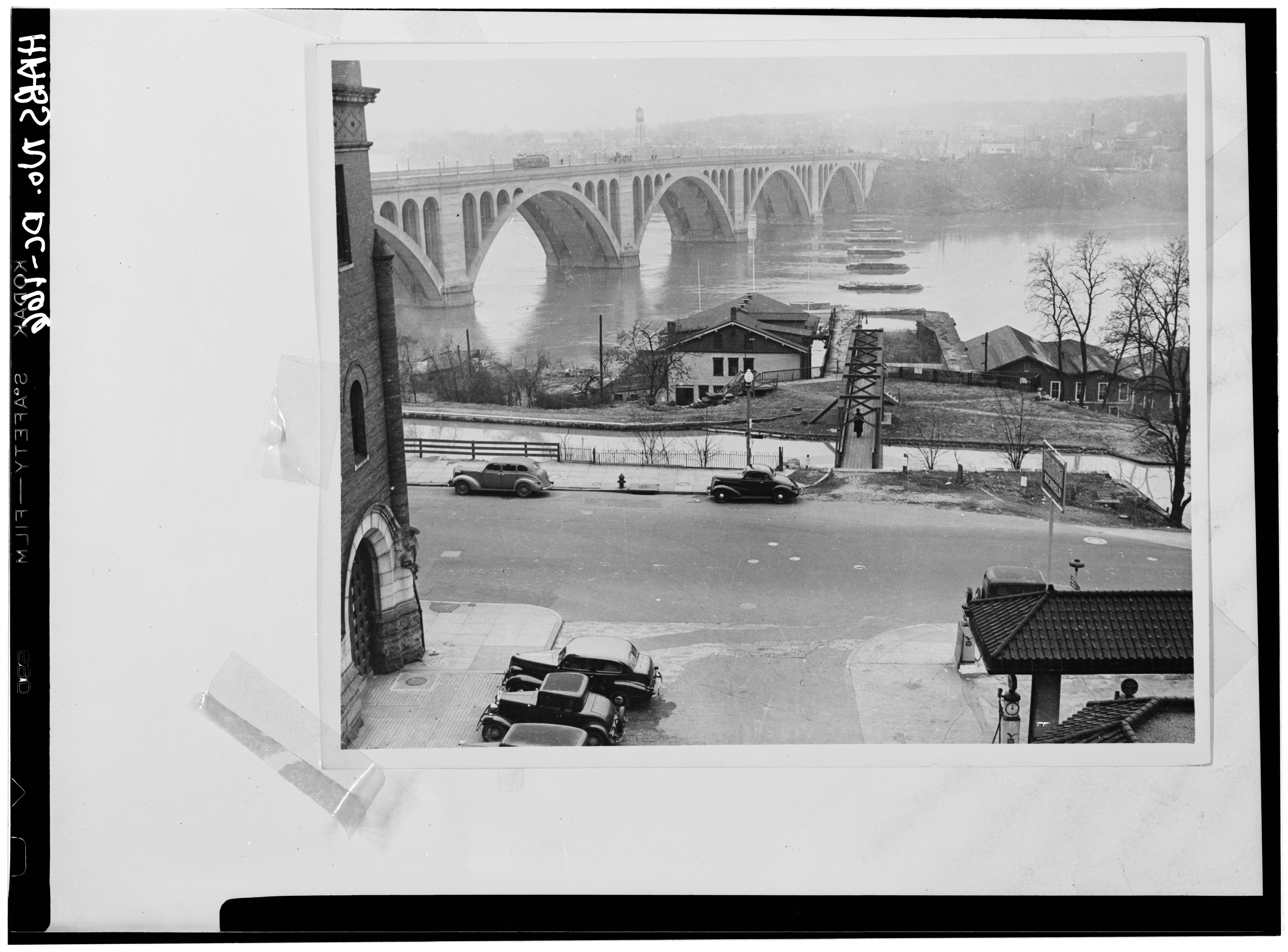
Aqueduct Bridge's Georgetown abutment and piers in Potomac river upstream of Key Bridge (c. 1940)

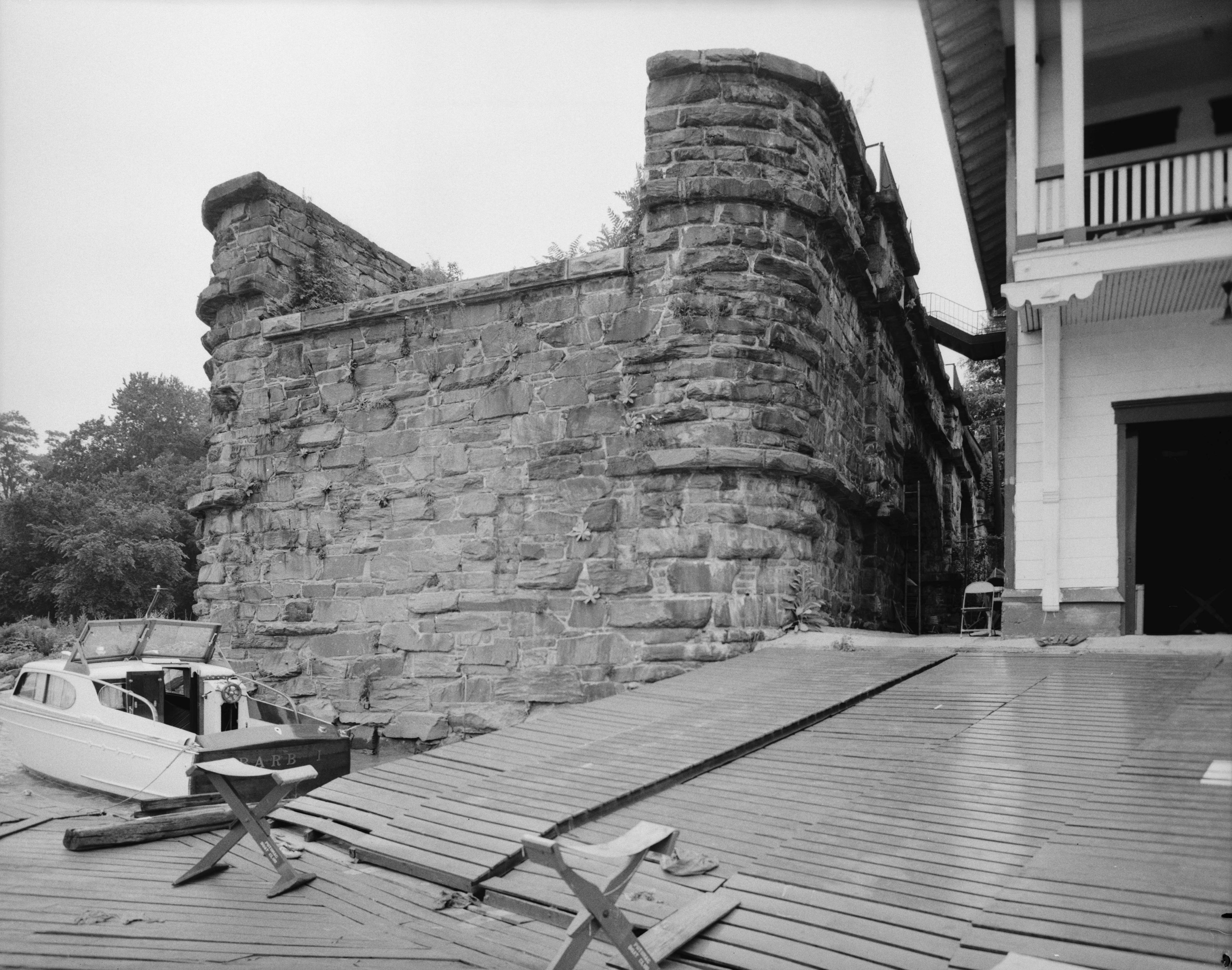
Second bridge's Georgetown abutment and Potomac Boat Club (1967)

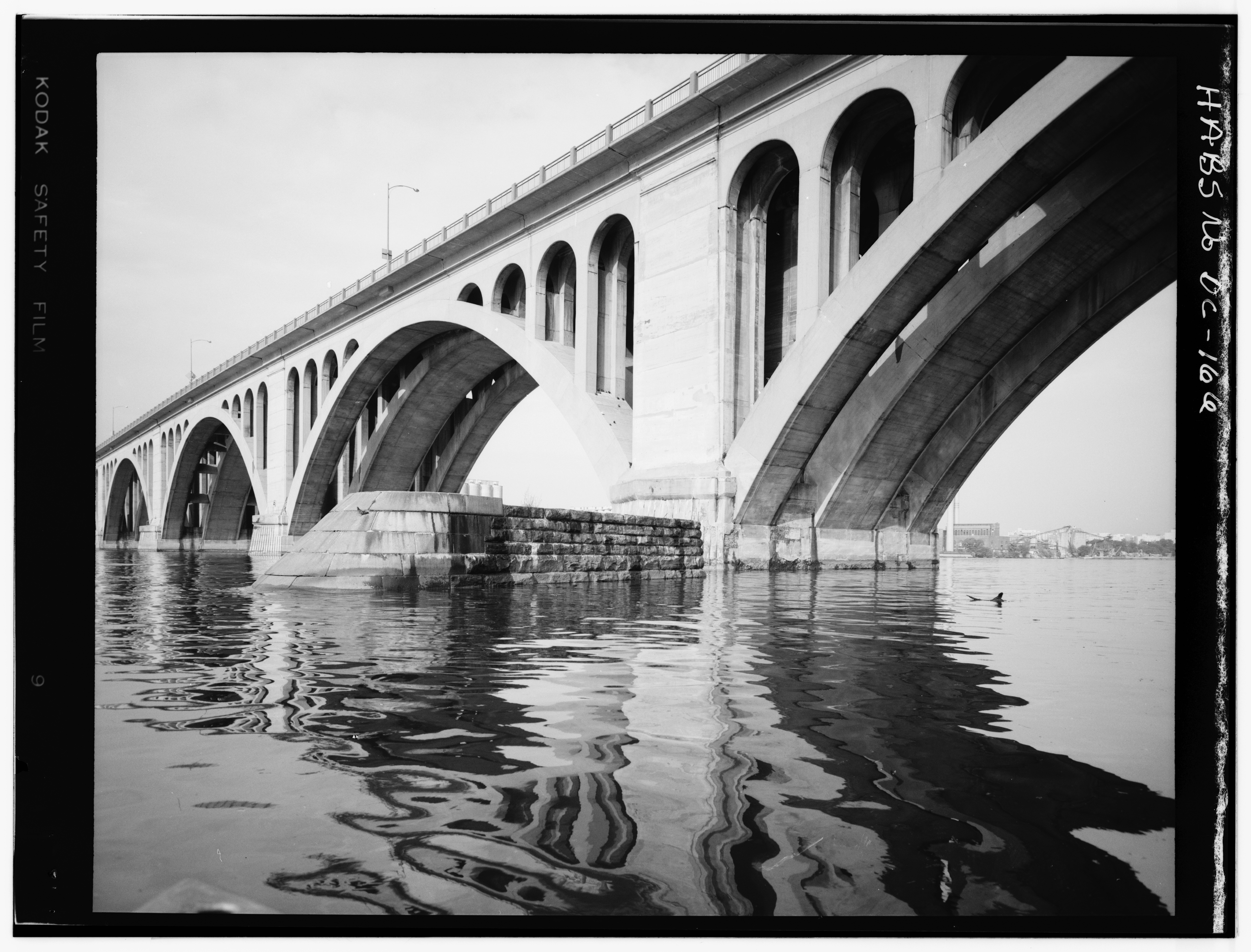
Aqueduct Bridge pier, from Virginia shore upstream of Key Bridge (1967)

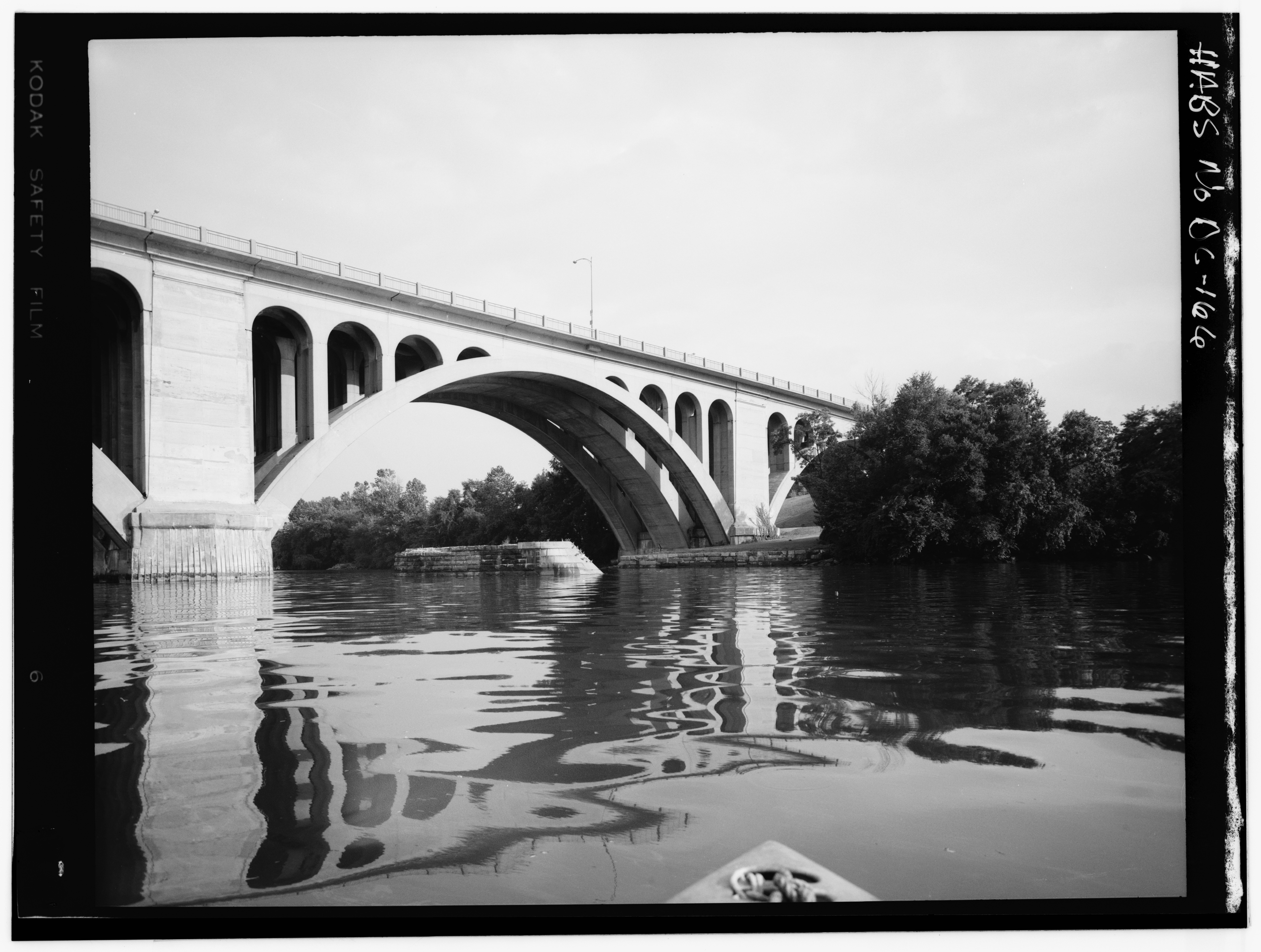
Pier and remnant of Virginia abutment of Aqueduct Bridge upstream of Key Bridge (1967)

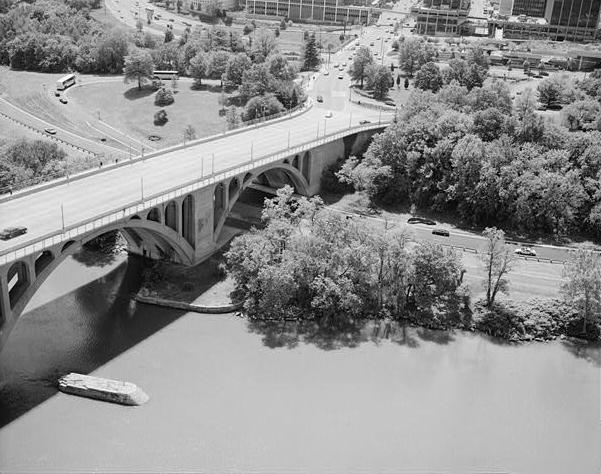
Aerial view of Key Bridge and George Washington Memorial Parkway, with pier of Aqueduct Bridge visible in the foreground and remnant of Aqueduct Bridge abutment visible on the Virginia shoreline (c. 1990)

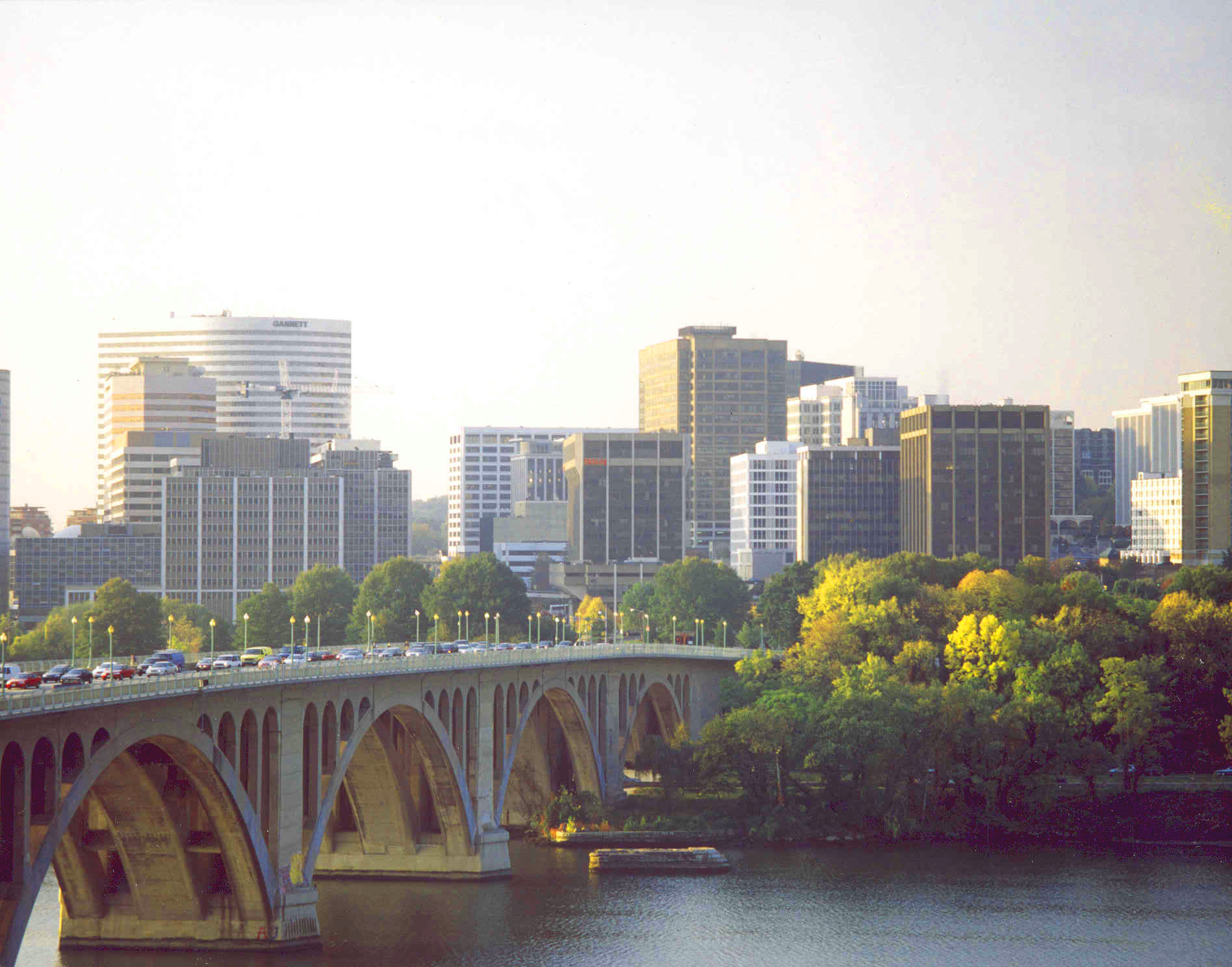
Pier and remnant of Virginia abutment of the Aqueduct Bridge upstream of Key Bridge (2005)

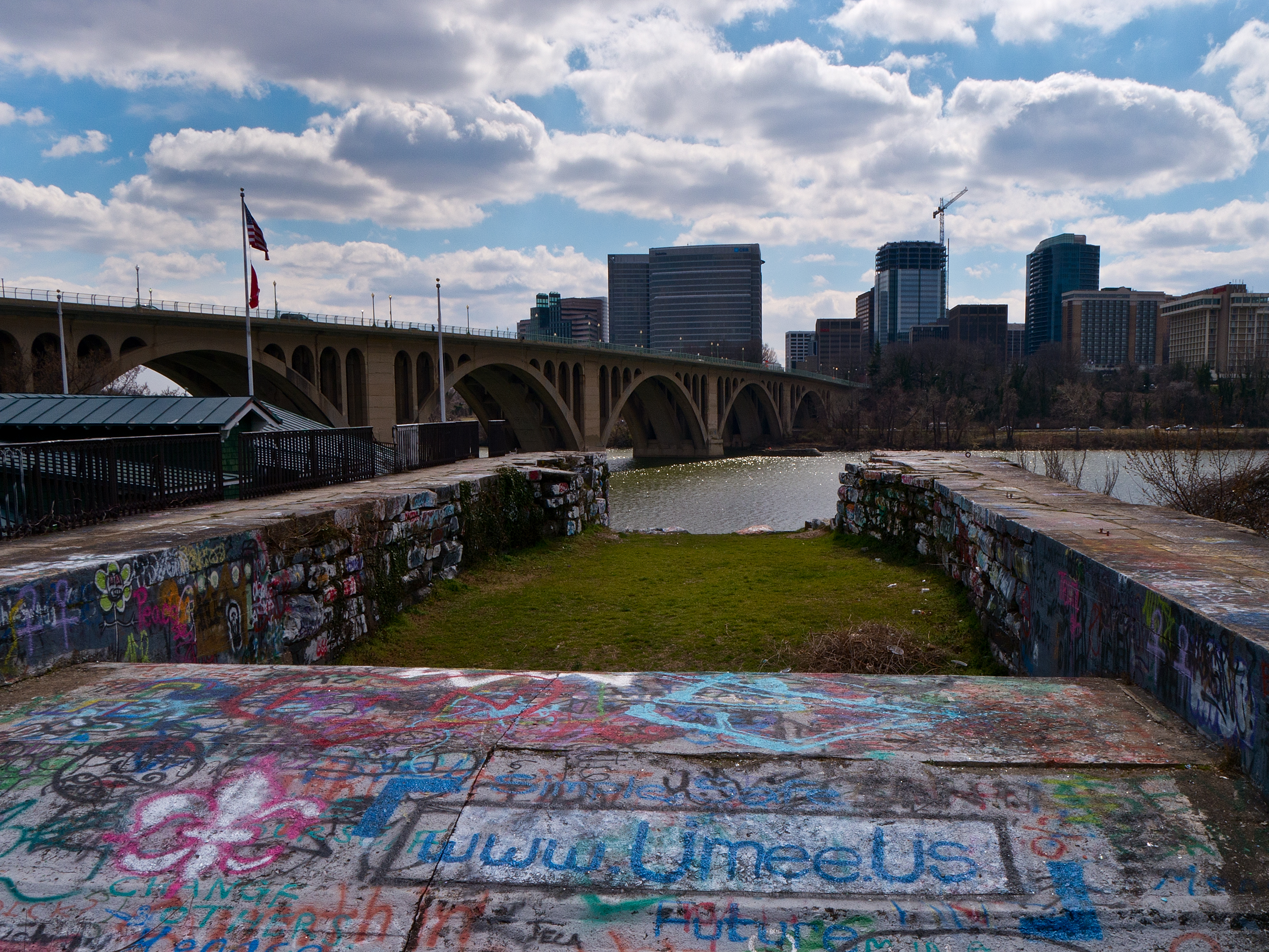
Georgetown abutment and pier of Aqueduct Bridge, seen from the Chesapeake and Ohio Canal towpath (2013)

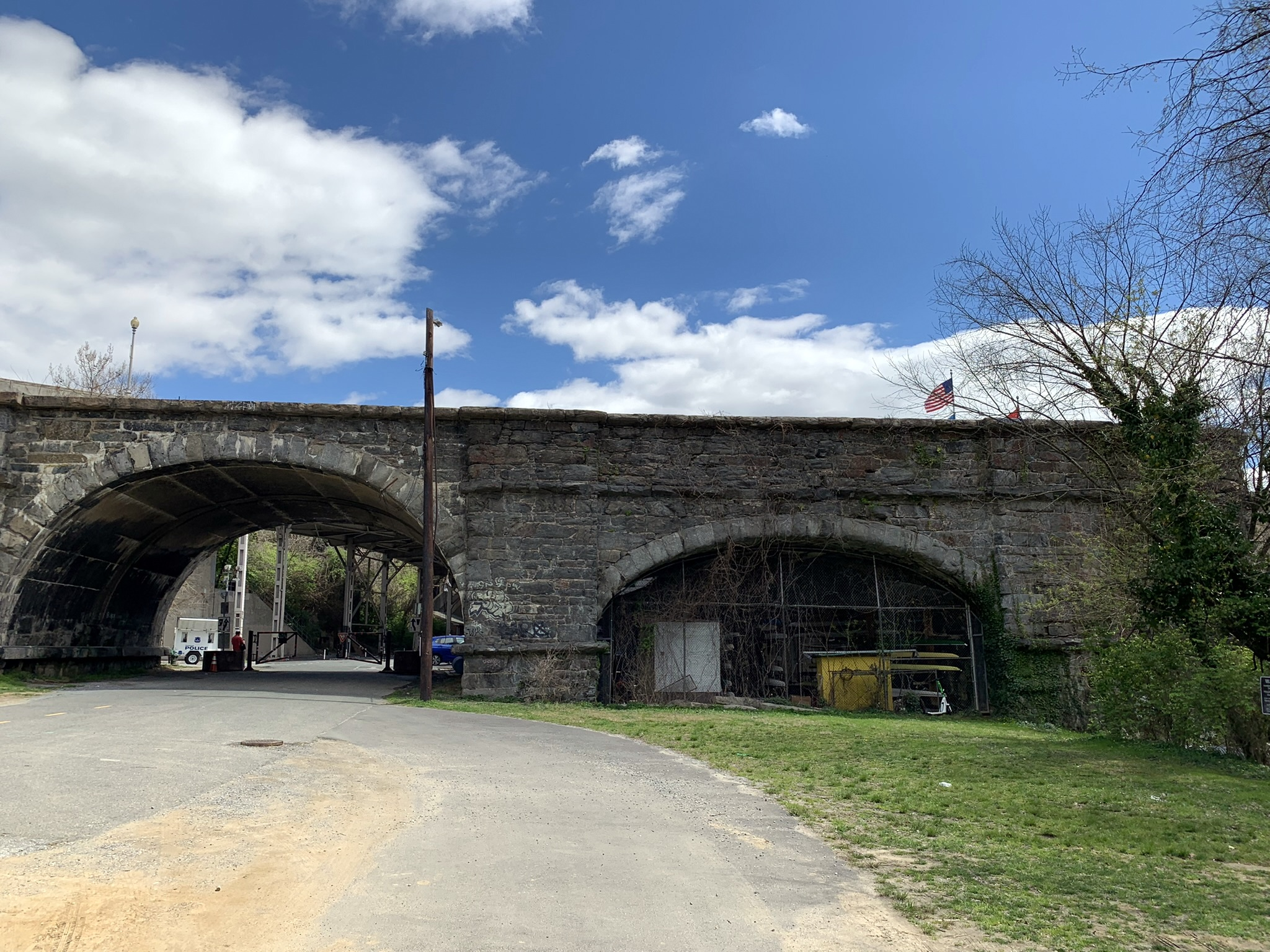
Aqueduct Bridge remnants seen from below (2022)

== See also ==
- List of bridges documented by the Historic American Engineering Record in Washington, D.C.
