= Hanneliese Spitz =

Austrian canoeist (born 1941)

Medal record

Women's canoe sprint

World Championships
Bronze medal – third place	1963 Jajce	K-1 500 m

Hanneliese Spitz (born 24 November 1941) is an Austrian sprint canoer who competed in the mid-1960s. She won a bronze medal in the K-1 500 m event at the 1963 ICF Canoe Sprint World Championships in Jajce.

Spitz also finished sixth in the K-1 500 m event at the 1964 Summer Olympics in Tokyo.
