= Zdenka Hradilová =

Czech sprint canoer (1938–2023)

Zdenka Hradilová (married Počtová; 27 April 1938 – 26 January 2023) was a Czech sprint canoer who competed for Czechoslovakia in the mid-1960s. She was eliminated in the semifinals of the K-1 500 m event at the 1964 Summer Olympics in Tokyo.
