= Edmund Lindmark =

Swedish artistic gymnast

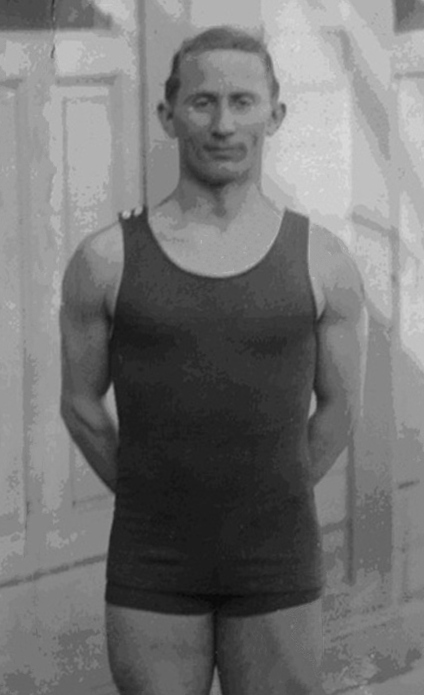
- Full name: Karl Edmund Lindmark
- Born: 6 July 1894 Umeå, United Kingdoms of Sweden and Norway
- Died: 11 February 1968 (aged 73) Stockholm, Sweden
- Relatives: Else-Marie Ljungdahl (daughter)

Gymnastics career
- Discipline: Men's artistic gymnastics
- Country represented: Sweden
- Club: Gymnastikklubben Gymnos; Stockholms KK
Medal record
Representing Sweden
Men's artistic gymnastics
Olympic Games
Gold medal – first place	1920 Antwerp	Team, Swedish system
Men's diving
European Championships
Silver medal – second place	1927 Bologna	3 m springboard

Karl Edmund Lindmark (6 July 1894 – 11 February 1968) was a Swedish gymnast and diver who participated in the 1920, 1924 and 1928 Summer Olympics. In 1920 he was part of the Swedish team that won the gold medal in the Swedish system event. In 1924 and 1928 he competed in 3 m springboard diving and finished fourth in 1924. In this event he won national titles in 1926 and 1928 and a European silver medal at the 1927 European Championships.

His daughter Else-Marie Ljungdahl became an Olympic canoe sprinter.
