= Margaret Buck =

Australian canoeist

Margaret Buck (born 10 December 1940) is an Australian sprint canoeist who competed in the mid-1960s. At the 1964 Summer Olympics in Tokyo, she finished ninth in the K-2 500 m event while being eliminated in the semifinals of the K-1 500 m event.
