= Maria Roka =

Hungarian canoeist (1940–2021)

Mária Róka (15 September 1940 – 28 September 2021) was a Hungarian canoe sprinter who competed in the mid-1960s. At the 1964 Summer Olympics in Tokyo, she finished seventh in the K-2 500 m event and eighth in the K-1 500 m event.
