= Nikolina Ruseva =

Bulgarian canoeist

Nikolina Ruseva (Bulgarian: Николина Русева) (12 May 1943 – 18 February 2021) was a Bulgarian sprint canoeist who competed in the mid-1960s. At the 1964 Summer Olympics in Tokyo, she was eliminated in the semifinals of the K-1 500 m event.
