= Glorianne Perrier =

American canoeist (1929–2015)

Olympic medal record

Women's canoe sprint
Silver medal – second place	1964 Tokyo	K-2 500 m

Glorianne Aurore "Gloria" Perrier (March 21, 1929 – March 7, 2015) was an American sprint canoer who competed in the 1960s. Competing in two Summer Olympics, she won a silver medal in the K-2 500 m event at Tokyo in 1964 with her K-2 partner Francine Fox.
