= Francine Fox =

American sprint canoer

Personal information
- Born: March 16, 1949 (age 77) Washington, D.C.
Medal record
Women's canoe sprint
Representing United States
Olympic Games
Silver medal – second place	1964 Tokyo	K-2 500 m

Francine Fox (born March 16, 1949) is an American sprint canoer who competed in the mid-1960s. She won a silver medal in the K-2 500 m event at the 1964 Summer Olympics in Tokyo with her K-2 partner Glorianne Perrier.

Fox was born in Washington, D.C. She later taught German in a suburban high school in Falls Church, Virginia, and introduced many high school women to kayaking.
