= Nina Gruzintseva =

Soviet canoeist (1934–2021)

Personal information
- Full name: Nina Aleksandrovna Gruzintseva
- Born: 7 April 1934 Leningrad, Russian SFSR, Soviet Union (now Saint Petersburg, Russian Federation)
- Died: 17 October 2021 (aged 87)
- Height: 1.68 m (5 ft 6 in)
- Weight: 70 kg (154 lb)

Sport
- Sport: Canoe racing
- Club: Spartak Novgorod
Medal record
Representing the Soviet Union
WorldChampionships
Gold medal – first place	1958 Prague	K-2 500 m
European Championships
Gold medal – first place	1957 Ghent	K-2 500 m
Silver medal – second place	1959 Dusiburg	K-2 500 m
Silver medal – second place	1961 Poznan	K-1 500 m
Gold medal – first place	1961 Poznan	K-2 500 m
Gold medal – first place	1961 Poznan	K-4 500 m

Nina Aleksandrovna Gruzintseva (Russian: Нина Александровна Грузинцева; 7 April 1934 – 17 October 2021) was a Russian Soviet canoe sprinter who had her best achievements on the 500 m distance in doubles (K-2 500 m). In this event she won a world title in 1958 and two European titles in 1957 and 1961; she finished fifth at the 1964 Summer Olympics. She also won European medals in the single and quad kayak events. Between 1955 and 1968 she won 18 national titles. After retiring from competitions she worked as a referee, particularly at the 1980 Summer Olympic Games.
