= Else-Marie Ljungdahl =

Swedish canoeist

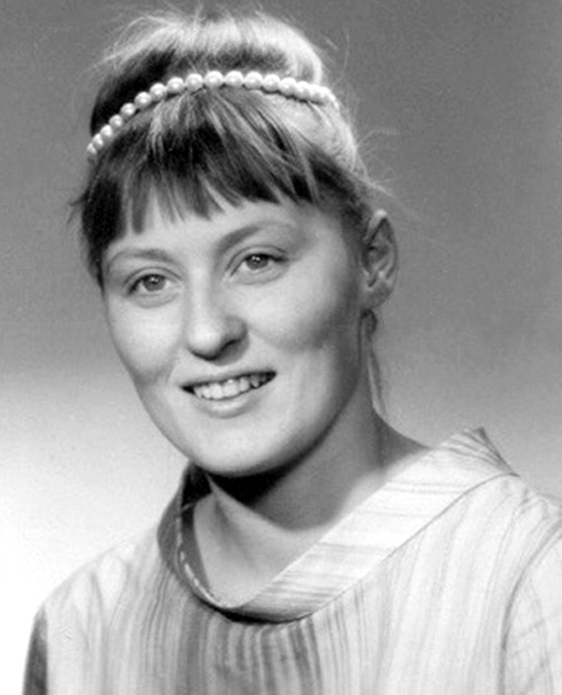

Personal information
- Born: 11 June 1942 (age 84) Solna Municipality, Stockholm, Sweden
- Height: 1.61 m (5 ft 3 in)
- Weight: 59 kg (130 lb)

Sport
- Sport: Canoe racing
- Club: Stockholms KK

Else-Marie Lindmark-Ljungdahl (born 11 June 1942) is a Swedish canoe sprinter. She competed at the 1960 and 1964 Olympics in the 500m kayak events, individual and doubles, and finished in 5–6 place. Her father, Edmund Lindmark, was an Olympic gymnast and diver.
