= Estonia at the 1936 Summer Olympics =

- IOC code: EST
- NOC: Estonian Olympic Committee

in Berlin
- Competitors: 37 (men) in 8 sports
- Flag bearer: Erich Altosaar
- Medals Ranked 13th: Gold 2 Silver 2 Bronze 3 Total 7

Summer Olympics appearances (overview)
- 1920; 1924; 1928; 1932; 1936; 1948–1988; 1992; 1996; 2000; 2004; 2008; 2012; 2016; 2020; 2024; 2028

Other related appearances
- Russian Empire (1908–1912); Soviet Union (1952–1988)

Estonia competed at the 1936 Summer Olympics in Berlin, Germany. It was the nation's fifth consecutive appearance at the Games since 1920, and also the last time prior to World War II. As the country was, after 1940, occupied by the Soviet Union, Nazi Germany, and the subsequent re-annexation by the Soviet Union, the next time Estonia was able to participate in the Summer Olympics as an independent nation came only with the 1992 Summer Olympics.

== Medals ==
Medal	Name	Sport	Event
Gold	Kristjan Palusalu	Wrestling	Men's Greco-Roman Heavyweight
Gold	Kristjan Palusalu	Wrestling	Men's Freestyle Heavyweight
Silver	Nikolai Stepulov	Boxing	Men's Lightweight
Silver	August Neo	Wrestling	Men's Freestyle Light Heavyweight
Bronze	Arnold Luhaäär	Weightlifting	Men's Heavyweight
Bronze	Voldemar Väli	Wrestling	Men's Greco-Roman Lightweight
Bronze	August Neo	Wrestling	Men's Greco-Roman Light Heavyweight

== The 1936 Estonian Olympic Team ==
Estonia sent 37 athletes and 13 representatives to the 1936 Summer games.

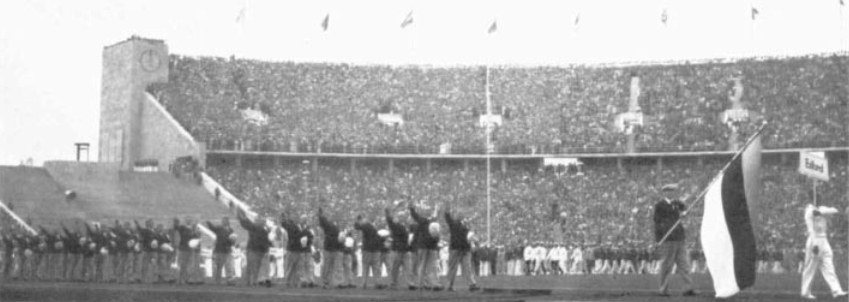
Estonian team at the opening ceremony of the 1936 Summer Olympics in Berlin

Representatives

The Estonian National Olympic Committee representative was Konrad Mauritz. Estonian team representatives were delegation heads: NOC secretary Ado Anderkopp and Harald Tammer, attaché Councillor at the Legation Georg Meri, Officer of the Honorary Service Lieutenant Refior, manager Johannes Villemson, Aleksander Paluvere in athletics, Nikolai Kursman in wrestling, Eduard Kõppo in weightlifting, Peeter Matsov in boxing, Gustav Laanekõrb in sailing, Richard Mast in swimming, Edgar Kolmpere in basketball, Aleksander Praks – massage therapist, Valentin Purre – team chef, dr. Arnold Roomere-Rõmmer – medical doctor. There were also 30 Estonian youths, led by Johan Meimer, taking part of The International Youth Encampment and 28 students took part of The International Physical Education Students' Encampment in Berlin.

Team coaches

Aleksander Kolmpere – athletics, Nikolai Kursman – wrestling, Herbert Niiler – basketball.

Judges

Aleksei Selenoi in basketball, Peeter Matsov in boxing; Johannes Kauba, Karl Kullisaar and Johannes Villemson in wrestling

Other delegations

Estonians in other delegations were Kalev Kotkas (from 1936 fi: Kalevi Kotkas) for Finland in athletics – high jump, Leonard Einsaar for Australia in rowing – Men's eight, Valentin Klõšeiko (pl: Walenty Kłyszejko) coach for Polish basketball team.

Press

Aleksander Antson (Eesti Spordipressi Klubi and Uusi Suomi), Oskar Lõvi alias Toomas Kivi (Postimees, Päevaleht and Eesti Raadio), Aadu Adari-Adorf (Uudisleht), Vladimir Raudsepp (Uus Eesti), Ilmar Peterson (Päevaleht), Aksel Vaik (Vaba Maa), Harald Nõmmik (Rahvaleht). Newspaper columnists Artur Reisner, Eevald Äärma, Johannes Villemson, Ernst Idla etc. The International Youth Encampment coverage by R. Uustal and The International Physical Education Students' Encampment coverage by Arved Ojari.

Olympic Identity Cards

The Organizing Committee issued 126 Olympic Identity Cards for Estonian participants.

== Athletics ==
Men
Track & road events

Athlete	Event	Heat		Quarterfinal		Semifinal		Final	
Athlete	Event	Result	Rank	Result	Rank	Result	Rank	Result	Rank
Ruudi Toomsalu	Men's 100 m	11.0	3	Did not advance					
Reginald Uba	Men's 1500 metres	4.26,2	8	Did not advance					

Field events

Athlete	Event	Heat		Final	
Athlete	Event	Result	Rank	Result	Rank
Eevald Äärma	Men's pole vault	3.70	26	Did not advance	
Koit Annamaa	Men's hammer throw	50.46	8 Q	50.46	8
Aksel Kuuse	Men's high jump	1.85	1 Q	1.90	10
Gustav Sule	Men's javelin throw	64.90	5 Q	63.26	11
Ruudi Toomsalu	Men's long jump	7.15	20	Did not advance	
Arnold Viiding	Men's shot put	15.23	8 Q	15.23	8

== Basketball ==
Men

- Estonian Team: (Artur Amon, Aleksander Illi, Robert Keres, Vladimir Kärk, Evald Mahl, Heino Veskila, Erich Altosaar, Aleksander Margiste, Bernhard Nooni, Leonid Saar, Georg Vinogradov, Coach: Herbert Niiler)

=== First round ===
Winners advanced to the second round. Losers competed in the first consolation round for another chance to move on.

7 August 1936	Estonia	34–29	France	Berlin, Germany
	Scoring by half: 16–17, 18–12

=== Second round ===
Winners advanced to the third round. Losers competed in the second consolation round for another chance to move on.

9 August 1936	United States	52–28	Estonia	Berlin, Germany

=== Third round ===
Winners advanced to the third round. Losers competed in the second consolation round for another chance to move on.

11 August 1936	Philippines	39–22	Estonia	Berlin, Germany

== Boxing ==
Men

Athlete	Event	Round of 32	Round of 16	Quarterfinals	Semifinals	Final	
Athlete	Event	Opposition Result	Opposition Result	Opposition Result	Opposition Result	Opposition Result	Rank
Evald Seeberg	Featherweight	Nicolae Berechet (ROU); W PTS	Theodore Kara (USA); L PTS	Did not advance			
Nikolai Stepulov	Lightweight	André Wollscheidt (LUX); W PTS	Hidekichi Nagamatsu (JPN); W PTS	Carlos Lillo (CHI); W PTS	Erik Ågren (SWE); W PTS	Imre Harangi (HUN); L PTS	Silver

== Rowing ==
Estonia had one rower participate in one out of seven rowing events in 1936.

Men

Athlete	Event	Heats		Repechage		Semifinals		Final	
Athlete	Event	Time	Rank	Time	Rank	Time	Rank	Time	Rank
Elmar Korko	Single sculls	7.40,4	3 q	7.44,1	3	Did not advance			13

== Sailing ==
Open

Athlete	Event	Race														Final rank	
Athlete	Event	1		2		3		4		5		6		7		Final rank	
Athlete	Event	Score	Rank	Score	Rank	Score	Rank	Score	Rank	Score	Rank	Score	Rank	Score	Rank	Score	Rank
Erik von Holst	O-Jolle	DNF	0	6	20	7	19	21	5	13	13	9	17	22	4	78	17

- Harald Tammik – reserve, Boat name: Brandenburg No. O/G 304

== Swimming ==
Men

Athlete	Event	Heat		Semifinal		Final	
Athlete	Event	Time	Rank	Time	Rank	Time	Rank
Boris Roolaid	100 metre backstroke	1.21,1	29	Did not advance			
Egon Roolaid	100 metre freestyle	1.01,5	20	Did not advance			

== Weightlifting ==
Men

Athlete	Event	Military Press		Snatch		Clean & Jerk		Total	Rank
Athlete	Event	Result	Rank	Result	Rank	Result	Rank	Total	Rank
Erm Lund	60 kg	72,5	16	85	11	112,5	8	270	13
Peeter Mürk	67.5 kg	75	16	95	10	115	11	285	11
Karl Oole	82.5 kg	87,5	13	100	11	132,5	13	320	14
Arnold Luhaäär	+82.5 kg	115	6	120	6	165 OR	1	400	Bronze

== Wrestling ==
Men's Freestyle

Athlete	Event	Elimination Pool							Final round	
Athlete	Event	Round 1 Result	Round 2 Result	Round 3 Result	Round 4 Result	Round 5 Result	Round 6 Result	Rank	Final round Result	Rank
Adalbert Toots	−66 kg	BYE	Eiichi Kazama (JPN); L 0–3	Howard Thomas (CAN); W 3–0	Charles Delporte (FRA); L F 4:00	—N/a		8	Did not advance	
August Kukk	−72 kg	Willy Angst (SUI); L F 5.40	Kálmán Sóvári (HUN); L 1–2	—N/a				13	Did not advance	
August Neo	−87 kg	Knut Fridell (SWE); L 0–3	Ede Virág-Ébner (HUN); W F 9.22	Ray Clemons (USA); W F 8.09	Paul Dätwyler (SUI); W 3–0	Erich Siebert (GER); W 3–0	—N/a	2	Erich Siebert (GER); W 3–0	Silver
Kristjan Palusalu	+87 kg	Josef Klapuch (TCH); W F 10.50	Robert Herland (FRA); W F 6.45	Mehmet Çoban (TUR); W 3–0	Werner Bürki (SUI); W F 6.15	Hjalmar Nyström (FIN); W 3–0	BYE	1	Hjalmar Nyström (FIN); W 3–0	Gold

Men's Greco-Roman

Athlete	Event	Elimination Pool							Final round	
Athlete	Event	Round 1 Result	Round 2 Result	Round 3 Result	Round 4 Result	Round 5 Result	Round 6 Result	Rank	Final round Result	Rank
Evald Sikk	−56 kg	Dante Bertoli (ITA); L 0–3	Josef Buemberger (AUT); W F 12.30	Ali Erfan (EGY); W 3–0	Márton Lõrincz (HUN); W 3–0	—N/a		6	Did not advance	
Voldemar Väli	−66 kg	Arild Dahl (NOR); W F 4.53	Heinrich Nettesheim (GER); W 3–0	Saim Arikan (TUR); W 3–0	Zbigniew Szajewski (POL); W F 15:21	Herbert Olofsson (SWE); W F 13.14	Lauri Koskela (FIN); L 1–2	3	Jozef Herda (TCH); L 0–3	Bronze
Edgar Puusepp	−72 kg	Fritz Schäfer (GER); L 0–3	Gyula Vincze (HUN); W F 13.40	Jean de Feu (BEL); W F 6.58	Rudolf Svedberg (SWE); L 0–3	—N/a		4	Did not advance	
Voldemar Mägi	−79 kg	Väinö Kokkinen (FIN); L 1–2	Ercole Gallegati (ITA); L 0–3	—N/a				11	Did not advance	
August Neo	−87 kg	BYE	Axel Cadier (SWE); L 0–3	Franz Foidl (AUT); W F 4.59	Umberto Silvestri (ITA); W F 12.19	Edvīns Bietags (LAT); L 1–2	—N/a	3	Did not advance	Bronze
Kristjan Palusalu	+87 kg	Eduard Schöll (AUT); W F 8.41	Zoltán Kondorossy (ROU); W F 10.36	John Nyman (SWE); W 3–0	Mehmet Çoban (TUR); W 3–0	Kurt Hornfischer (GER); W 3–0	BYE	1	Kurt Hornfischer (GER); W 3–0	Gold
