= Wrestling at the 1936 Summer Olympics – Men's Greco-Roman light heavyweight =

Men's Greco-Roman light heavyweight at the Games of the XI Olympiad
- Venue: Deutschlandhalle
- Dates: 6–9 August 1936
- Competitors: 13 from 13 nations

Medalists
1st place, gold medalist(s)		Axel Cadier	Sweden
2nd place, silver medalist(s)		Edvīns Bietags	Latvia
3rd place, bronze medalist(s)		August Neo	Estonia

The men's Greco-Roman light heavyweight competition at the 1936 Summer Olympics in Berlin took place from 6 August to 9 August at the Deutschlandhalle. Nations were limited to one competitor. This weight class was limited to wrestlers weighing up to 87kg.

This Greco-Roman wrestling competition continued to use the "bad points" elimination system introduced at the 1928 Summer Olympics, with a slight modification. Each round featured all wrestlers pairing off and wrestling one bout (with one wrestler having a bye if there were an odd number). The loser received 3 points if the loss was by fall or unanimous decision and 2 points if the decision was 2-1 (this was the modification from prior years, where all losses were 3 points). The winner received 1 point if the win was by decision and 0 points if the win was by fall. At the end of each round, any wrestler with at least 5 points was eliminated.

== Schedule ==
Date	Event
6 August 1936	Round 1
7 August 1936	Round 2
8 August 1936	Round 3 Round 4
9 August 1936	Round 5 Round 6

== Results ==
=== Round 1 ===
Of the six bouts, five were won by fall giving the winners 0 points. Neo also had 0 points after a first-round bye. Avcioglu was the only wrestler with a win by decision and 1 point. All six losers were defeated by fall or unanimous decision, so each had 3 points.

Bouts

Winner	Nation	Victory Type	Loser	Nation
Axel Cadier	Sweden	Fall	Edvard Westerlund	Finland
Umberto Silvestri	Italy	Fall	Jean Houdry	France
Olaf Knudsen	Norway	Fall	František Mrášek	Czechoslovakia
Mustafa Avcioğlu-Çakmak	Turkey	Decision, 3–0	Gyula Bóbis	Hungary
Edvīns Bietags	Latvia	Fall	Werner Seelenbinder	Germany
Franz Foidl	Austria	Fall	Georg Argast	Switzerland
August Neo	Estonia	Bye	N/A	N/A

Points

Rank	Wrestler	Nation	Start	Earned	Total
1	Axel Cadier	Sweden	0	0	0
1	Umberto Silvestri	Italy	0	0	0
1	Olaf Knudsen	Norway	0	0	0
1	Edvīns Bietags	Latvia	0	0	0
1	Franz Foidl	Austria	0	0	0
1	August Neo	Estonia	0	0	0
7	Mustafa Avcioglu	Turkey	0	1	1
8	Edvard Westerlund	Finland	0	3	3
8	Jean Houdry	France	0	3	3
8	František Mrášek	Czechoslovakia	0	3	3
8	Gyula Bóbis	Hungary	0	3	3
8	Werner Seelenbinder	Germany	0	3	3
8	Georg Argast	Switzerland	0	3	3

=== Round 2 ===
Four men were eliminated with a second loss; Mrášek had the best result among them as one of his losses was by split decision. Bietags, Foidl, and Silvestri maintained their 0 point scores, with Cadier earning a point but still immune from elimination in the following round. Avcioglu's second win was also by decision, leaving him with 2 points. The remaining four wrestlers advanced with 3 points.

Bouts

Winner	Nation	Victory Type	Loser	Nation
Axel Cadier	Sweden	Decision, 3–0	August Neo	Estonia
Edvard Westerlund	Finland	Fall	Jean Houdry	France
Umberto Silvestri	Italy	Fall	Olaf Knudsen	Norway
Mustafa Avcioglu	Turkey	Decision, 2–1	František Mrášek	Czechoslovakia
Edvīns Bietags	Latvia	Fall	Gyula Bóbis	Hungary
Werner Seelenbinder	Germany	Fall	Georg Argast	Switzerland
Franz Foidl	Austria	Bye	N/A	N/A

Points

Rank	Wrestler	Nation	Start	Earned	Total
1	Edvīns Bietags	Latvia	0	0	0
1	Franz Foidl	Austria	0	0	0
1	Umberto Silvestri	Italy	0	0	0
4	Axel Cadier	Sweden	0	1	1
5	Mustafa Avcioglu	Turkey	1	1	2
6	Olaf Knudsen	Norway	0	3	3
6	August Neo	Estonia	0	3	3
6	Werner Seelenbinder	Germany	3	0	3
6	Edvard Westerlund	Finland	3	0	3
10	František Mrášek	Czechoslovakia	3	2	5
11	Georg Argast	Switzerland	3	3	6
11	Gyula Bóbis	Hungary	3	3	6
11	Jean Houdry	France	3	3	6

=== Round 3 ===
All four bouts were won by fall; the winners stayed on their starting point totals (Bietags at 0, Cadier at 1, Knudsen and Neo at 3) as did Seelenbinder (3 points) with a bye. Two of the losers had started with 0 points. They ended with 3 as well. Avcioglu's first loss was enough to eliminate him, as he had 2 points from wins by decision before. Westerlund had his second loss and was also eliminated.

Bouts

Winner	Nation	Victory Type	Loser	Nation
August Neo	Estonia	Fall	Franz Foidl	Austria
Axel Cadier	Sweden	Fall	Umberto Silvestri	Italy
Olaf Knudsen	Norway	Fall	Edvard Westerlund	Finland
Edvīns Bietags	Latvia	Fall	Mustafa Avcioglu	Turkey
Werner Seelenbinder	Germany	Bye	N/A	N/A

Points

Rank	Wrestler	Nation	Start	Earned	Total
1	Edvīns Bietags	Latvia	0	0	0
2	Axel Cadier	Sweden	1	0	1
3	Franz Foidl	Austria	0	3	3
3	Olaf Knudsen	Norway	3	0	3
3	August Neo	Estonia	3	0	3
3	Werner Seelenbinder	Germany	3	0	3
3	Umberto Silvestri	Italy	0	3	3
8	Mustafa Avcioglu	Turkey	2	3	5
9	Edvard Westerlund	Finland	3	3	6

=== Round 4 ===
Again each bout was won by fall. Beitags (0 points) and Cadier (1 point) were the only two wrestlers who could afford to lose without being eliminated; neither did. All three losers were eliminated. Seelenbinder and Neo stayed in contention at 3 points. The official report assigns individual ranking through 6th place, leaving Foidl in 7th by default.

Bouts

Winner	Nation	Victory Type	Loser	Nation
Werner Seelenbinder	Germany	Fall	Franz Foidl	Austria
August Neo	Estonia	Fall	Umberto Silvestri	Italy
Axel Cadier	Sweden	Fall	Olaf Knudsen	Norway
Edvīns Bietags	Latvia	Bye	N/A	N/A

Points

Rank	Wrestler	Nation	Start	Earned	Total
1	Edvīns Bietags	Latvia	0	0	0
2	Axel Cadier	Sweden	1	0	1
3	August Neo	Estonia	3	0	3
3	Werner Seelenbinder	Germany	3	0	3
5	Umberto Silvestri	Italy	3	3	6
6	Olaf Knudsen	Norway	3	3	6
7	Franz Foidl	Austria	3	3	6

=== Round 5 ===
Both matches featured one wrestler who could not be eliminated and one who could; in both cases, the vulnerable wrestler lost. Neo finished with the bronze medal over Seelenbinder as his split-decision loss put him at 5 points to Seelenbinder's 6. Bietags and Cadier moved on to face each other in a de facto final.

Bouts

Winner	Nation	Victory Type	Loser	Nation
Edvīns Bietags	Latvia	Decision, 2–1	August Neo	Estonia
Axel Cadier	Sweden	Decision, 3–0	Werner Seelenbinder	Germany

Points

Rank	Wrestler	Nation	Start	Earned	Total
1	Edvīns Bietags	Latvia	0	1	1
2	Axel Cadier	Sweden	1	1	2
3rd place, bronze medalist(s)	August Neo	Estonia	3	2	5
4	Werner Seelenbinder	Germany	3	3	6

=== Round 6 ===
Cadier won the round 6 bout that effectively served as a gold medal final, with only two wrestlers left.

Bouts

Winner	Nation	Victory Type	Loser	Nation
Axel Cadier	Sweden	Decision, 3–0	Edvīns Bietags	Latvia

Points

Rank	Wrestler	Nation	Start	Earned	Total
1st place, gold medalist(s)	Axel Cadier	Sweden	2	1	3
2nd place, silver medalist(s)	Edvīns Bietags	Latvia	1	3	4
