= 1939 European Wrestling Championships =

- Host city: Norway, Oslo
- Dates: 24–27 April 1939

Champions
- Greco-Roman: Sweden

The 1939 European Wrestling Championships were held in 24–27 April 1939 Oslo, Norway. The competitions were held only in Greco-Roman wrestling.

== Medal table ==
Rank	Nation	Gold	Silver	Bronze	Total
1	Sweden	3	2	0	5
2	Finland	2	0	3	5
3	Germany	1	2	0	3
4	Estonia	1	1	1	3
5	Turkey	0	2	0	2
6	Norway	0	1	0	1
7	Hungary	0	0	2	2
Totals (7 entries)		7	8	6	21

== Medal summary ==
=== Men's Greco-Roman ===
Event	Gold	Silver	Bronze
Bantamweight; 56 kg	Kauko Kiiseli; Finland	Ivar Stokke; Norway; Kurt Pettersén; Sweden	None awarded [[|]]
Featherweight; 61 kg	Kustaa Pihlajamäki; Finland	Ferdinand Schmitz; Germany	Ferenc Tóth; Hungary
Lightweight; 66 kg	Gösta Andersson; Sweden	Yaşar Doğu; Turkey	Lauri Koskela; Finland
Welterweight; 72 kg	Fritz Schäfer; Germany	Edgar Puusepp; Estonia	Eino Virtanen; Finland
Middleweight; 79 kg	Ivar Johansson; Sweden	Ludwig Schweickert; Germany	Arvi Pikkusaari; Finland
Light heavyweight 87 kg	Nils Åkerlindh; Sweden	Mustafa Çakmak; Turkey	August Neo; Estonia
Heavyweight +87 kg	Johannes Kotkas; Estonia	John Nyman; Sweden	Gyula Bóbis; Hungary
