= Wrestling at the 1936 Summer Olympics – Men's Greco-Roman heavyweight =

Men's Greco-Roman heavyweight at the Games of the XI Olympiad
- Venue: Deutschlandhalle
- Dates: 6–9 August 1936
- Competitors: 12 from 12 nations

Medalists
1st place, gold medalist(s)		Kristjan Palusalu	Estonia
2nd place, silver medalist(s)		John Nyman	Sweden
3rd place, bronze medalist(s)		Kurt Hornfischer	Germany

The men's Greco-Roman heavyweight competition at the 1936 Summer Olympics in Berlin took place from 6 August to 9 August at the Deutschlandhalle. Nations were limited to one competitor. This weight class allowed wrestlers weighing over 87kg.

This Greco-Roman wrestling competition continued to use the "bad points" elimination system introduced at the 1928 Summer Olympics, with a slight modification. Each round featured all wrestlers pairing off and wrestling one bout (with one wrestler having a bye if there were an odd number). The loser received 3 points if the loss was by fall or unanimous decision and 2 points if the decision was 2-1 (this was the modification from prior years, where all losses were 3 points). The winner received 1 point if the win was by decision and 0 points if the win was by fall. At the end of each round, any wrestler with at least 5 points was eliminated.

== Schedule ==
Date	Event
6 August 1936	Round 1
7 August 1936	Round 2
8 August 1936	Round 3
9 August 1936	Round 4 Round 5

== Results ==
=== Round 1 ===
Of the six bouts, five were won by fall giving the winners 0 points and the losers 3 points. The remaining bout was a split decision, giving Donati 1 point for winning and Çoban 2 points for losing.

Bouts

Winner	Nation	Victory Type	Loser	Nation
Josef Klapuch	Czechoslovakia	Fall	Alberts Zvejnieks	Latvia
Kurt Hornfischer	Germany	Fall	Stevan Nagy	Yugoslavia
Aleardo Donati	Italy	Decision, 2–1	Mehmet Çoban	Turkey
Hjalmar Nyström	Finland	Fall	Peter Larsen	Denmark
Kristjan Palusalu	Estonia	Fall	Eduard Schöll	Austria
John Nyman	Sweden	Fall	Zoltan Kondorossy	Romania

Points

Rank	Wrestler	Nation	Start	Earned	Total
1	Kurt Hornfischer	Germany	0	0	0
1	Josef Klapuch	Czechoslovakia	0	0	0
1	John Nyman	Sweden	0	0	0
1	Hjalmar Nyström	Finland	0	0	0
1	Kristjan Palusalu	Estonia	0	0	0
6	Aleardo Donati	Italy	0	1	1
7	Mehmet Çoban	Turkey	0	2	2
8	Zoltan Kondorossy	Romania	0	3	3
8	Peter Larsen	Denmark	0	3	3
8	Stevan Nagy	Yugoslavia	0	3	3
8	Eduard Schöll	Austria	0	3	3
8	Alberts Zvejnieks	Latvia	0	3	3

=== Round 2 ===
Four of the first round winners won again, with two finishing the second round at 0 points and two finishing the round at 1 point. Four of the first round losers lost again and were eliminated. Çoban, the loser of the split decision in the first round, won by fall to stay at 2 points. Donati, the winner of that first-round decision, fell to 4 points after losing in the second round. The remaining two men had 3 points after the round.

Bouts

Winner	Nation	Victory Type	Loser	Nation
Alberts Zvejnieks	Latvia	Fall	Stevan Nagy	Yugoslavia
Kurt Hornfischer	Germany	Decision, 3–0	Josef Klapuch	Czechoslovakia
Hjalmar Nyström	Finland	Decision, 3–0	Aleardo Donati	Italy
Mehmet Çoban	Turkey	Fall	Peter Larsen	Denmark
Kristjan Palusalu	Estonia	Fall	Zoltan Kondorossy	Romania
John Nyman	Sweden	Fall	Eduard Schöll	Austria

Points

Rank	Wrestler	Nation	Start	Earned	Total
1	John Nyman	Sweden	0	0	0
1	Kristjan Palusalu	Estonia	0	0	0
3	Kurt Hornfischer	Germany	0	1	1
3	Hjalmar Nyström	Finland	0	1	1
5	Mehmet Çoban	Turkey	2	0	2
6	Josef Klapuch	Czechoslovakia	0	3	3
6	Alberts Zvejnieks	Latvia	3	0	3
8	Aleardo Donati	Italy	1	3	4
9	Zoltan Kondorossy	Romania	3	3	6
9	Peter Larsen	Denmark	3	3	6
9	Stevan Nagy	Yugoslavia	3	3	6
9	Eduard Schöll	Austria	3	3	6

=== Round 3 ===
The two 0-point wrestlers faced each other; Palusalu won by decision, so both received their first points (1 for Palusalu, 3 for Nyman). Çoban beat Nyström in a split decision, which resulted in both finishing the round at 3 points. Hornfischer received his second point in a win by decision over Zvejnieks, who was eliminated with the second loss. Klapuch arrived late, being eliminated by losing by default to Donati (who, at 4 points going into the round, needed the 0 to stay in contention).

Bouts

Winner	Nation	Victory Type	Loser	Nation
Kurt Hornfischer	Germany	Decision, 3–0	Alberts Zvejnieks	Latvia
Aleardo Donati	Italy	Default	Josef Klapuch	Czechoslovakia
Mehmet Çoban	Turkey	Decision, 2–1	Hjalmar Nyström	Finland
Kristjan Palusalu	Estonia	Decision, 3–0	John Nyman	Sweden

Points

Rank	Wrestler	Nation	Start	Earned	Total
1	Kristjan Palusalu	Estonia	0	1	1
2	Kurt Hornfischer	Germany	1	1	2
3	Mehmet Çoban	Turkey	2	1	3
3	John Nyman	Sweden	0	3	3
3	Hjalmar Nyström	Finland	1	2	3
6	Aleardo Donati	Italy	4	0	4
7	Josef Klapuch	Czechoslovakia	3	3	6
7	Alberts Zvejnieks	Latvia	3	3	6

=== Round 4 ===
This round eliminated half of the remaining wrestlers, with each bout's loser going over 5 points. Palusalu and Hornfischer ended the round with 2 points, Nyman with 3. The official report lists Çoban as 4th and Nyström as 5th.

Bouts

Winner	Nation	Victory Type	Loser	Nation
Kurt Hornfischer	Germany	Fall	Aleardo Donati	Italy
Kristjan Palusalu	Estonia	Decision, 3–0	Mehmet Çoban	Turkey
John Nyman	Sweden	Fall	Hjalmar Nyström	Finland

Points

Rank	Wrestler	Nation	Start	Earned	Total
1	Kristjan Palusalu	Estonia	1	1	2
1	Kurt Hornfischer	Germany	2	0	2
3	John Nyman	Sweden	3	0	3
4	Mehmet Çoban	Turkey	3	3	6
5	Hjalmar Nyström	Finland	3	3	6
6	Aleardo Donati	Italy	4	3	7

=== Round 5 ===
Palusalu's win ended the competition, eliminating Hornfischer. Palusalu had previously defeated Nyman, so any win for Palusalu in this round would secure the gold. Hornfischer had not faced Nyman, so a Hornfischer win here would have set up that match as a final round (with Palusalu still eligible for silver or even gold if the loss to Hornfischer had been by split decision).

Bouts

Winner	Nation	Victory Type	Loser	Nation
Kristjan Palusalu	Estonia	Decision, 3–0	Kurt Hornfischer	Germany
John Nyman	Sweden	Bye	N/A	N/A

Points

Rank	Wrestler	Nation	Start	Earned	Total
1st place, gold medalist(s)	Kristjan Palusalu	Estonia	2	1	3
2nd place, silver medalist(s)	John Nyman	Sweden	3	0	3
3rd place, bronze medalist(s)	Kurt Hornfischer	Germany	2	3	5
