= 1933 European Wrestling Championships =

- Host city: France Paris, Freestyle; Finland Helsinki, Greco-Roman
- Dates: 26–30 November 1933; 17–21 March 1933

Champions
- Freestyle: Switzerland
- Greco-Roman: Finland

The 1933 European Wrestling Championships were held in the men's Freestyle style in Paris 26–30 November 1933; the Greco-Romane style and in Helsinki 17–21 March 1933.

== Medal table ==
Rank	Nation	Gold	Silver	Bronze	Total
1	Hungary	4	0	0	4
2	Finland	3	2	1	6
3	Germany	2	3	1	6
3	Sweden	2	3	1	6
5	Switzerland	2	2	0	4
6	France	1	2	3	6
7	Belgium	0	2	1	3
8	Estonia	0	0	2	2
8	Norway	0	0	2	2
10	Austria	0	0	1	1
10	Great Britain	0	0	1	1
Totals (11 entries)		14	14	13	41

== Medal summary ==
=== Men's freestyle ===
Event	Gold	Silver	Bronze
56 kg	Ödön Zombori; Hungary	Hermann Fischer; Germany	Joseph Reid; Great Britain
61 kg	Ferenc Tóth; Hungary	Jean Vordermann; Switzerland	Leborre; France
66 kg	Wolfgang Ehrl; Switzerland	Anders Swansson; France	Not Awarded
72 kg	Jean Földeák; Germany	Hans Minder; Switzerland	P. Arnaud; France
79 kg	Jean Jourlin; France	René Vanderveeken; Belgium	Fritz Oberlander; Austria
87 kg	László Papp; Hungary	Henri Deniel; France	Julien Cammaert; Belgium
87+ kg	Willy Bürki; Switzerland	Léon Charlier; Belgium	L. Ghevaert; France

=== Men's Greco-Roman ===
Event	Gold	Silver	Bronze
56 kg	Ödön Zombori; Hungary	Herman Tuvesson; Sweden	Robert Voigt; Germany
61 kg	Kustaa Pihlajamäki; Finland	Wolfgang Ehrl; Germany	Sven Martinsen; Norway
66 kg	Aarne Reini; Finland	Einar Karlsson; Sweden	Arild Dahl; Norway
72 kg	Mikko Nordling; Finland	Gunnar Glans; Sweden	Albert Kusnets; Estonia
79 kg	Axel Cadier; Sweden	Jean Földeák; Germany	Edvard Westerlund; Finland
87 kg	Rudolf Svensson; Sweden	Väinö Kokkinen; Finland	Olaf Luiga; Estonia
87+ kg	Kurt Hornfischer; Germany	Arvo Niemelä; Finland	Carl Westergren; Sweden
