= Wrestling at the 1936 Summer Olympics – Men's freestyle light heavyweight =

Men's freestyle light heavyweight at the Games of the XI Olympiad
- Venue: Deutschlandhalle
- Dates: 3–4 August 1936
- Competitors: 12 from 12 nations

Medalists
1st place, gold medalist(s)		Knut Fridell	Sweden
2nd place, silver medalist(s)		August Neo	Estonia
3rd place, bronze medalist(s)		Erich Siebert	Germany

The men's freestyle light heavyweight competition at the 1936 Summer Olympics in Berlin took place from 3 August to 4 August at the Deutschlandhalle. Nations were limited to one competitor. This weight class was limited to wrestlers weighing up to 87kg.

This freestyle wrestling competition continued to use the "bad points" elimination system introduced at the 1928 Summer Olympics for Greco-Roman and at the 1932 Summer Olympics for freestyle wrestling, with a slight modification. Each round featured all wrestlers pairing off and wrestling one bout (with one wrestler having a bye if there were an odd number). The loser received 3 points if the loss was by fall or unanimous decision and 2 points if the decision was 2-1 (this was the modification from prior years, where all losses were 3 points). The winner received 1 point if the win was by decision and 0 points if the win was by fall. At the end of each round, any wrestler with at least 5 points was eliminated.

== Schedule ==
Date	Event
3 August 1936	Round 1
4 August 1936	Round 2 Round 3 Round 4 Round 5

== Results ==
=== Round 1 ===
Of the winners, two won by fall and advanced with 0 points while four won by decision and moved to the second round with 1 point. All six losers received 3 points for defeats by fall or unanimous decision.

Bouts

Winner	Nation	Victory Type	Loser	Nation
Knut Fridell	Sweden	Decision, 3–0	August Neo	Estonia
Ede Virág-Ébner	Hungary	Decision, 3–0	Matti Lahti	Finland
Mustafa Avcioglu	Turkey	Decision, 3–0	Thomas Ward	Great Britain
Ray Clemons	United States	Fall	Paul Dätwyler	Switzerland
Eddie Scarf	Australia	Fall	Maurice Beke	Belgium
Erich Siebert	Germany	Decision, 3–0	Hubert Prokop	Czechoslovakia

Points

Rank	Wrestler	Nation	Start	Earned	Total
1	Ray Clemons	United States	0	0	0
1	Eddie Scarf	Australia	0	0	0
3	Mustafa Avcioglu	Turkey	0	1	1
3	Knut Fridell	Sweden	0	1	1
3	Erich Siebert	Germany	0	1	1
3	Ede Virág-Ébner	Hungary	0	1	1
7	Maurice Beke	Belgium	0	3	3
7	Paul Dätwyler	Switzerland	0	3	3
7	Matti Lahti	Finland	0	3	3
7	August Neo	Estonia	0	3	3
7	Hubert Prokop	Czechoslovakia	0	3	3
7	Thomas Ward	Great Britain	0	3	3

=== Round 2 ===
Clemons and Siebert were the best wrestlers through the first two rounds, each with 1 point for a win by decision and a win by fall. Fridell was also 2–0, but both wins were by decision and he had 2 points. Scarf finished the round at 2 points as well, with a 1–1 record (win by fall, loss by split decision). Six other wrestlers had a 1–1 record and finished the round with 3 or 4 points. Three had lost both the first two rounds and were eliminated.

Bouts

Winner	Nation	Victory Type	Loser	Nation
August Neo	Estonia	Fall	Ede Virág-Ébner	Hungary
Knut Fridell	Sweden	Decision, 3–0	Matti Lahti	Finland
Ray Clemons	United States	Decision, 3–0	Thomas Ward	Great Britain
Paul Dätwyler	Switzerland	Fall	Mustafa Avcioglu	Turkey
Erich Siebert	Germany	Fall	Maurice Beke	Belgium
Hubert Prokop	Czechoslovakia	Decision, 2–1	Eddie Scarf	Australia

Points

Rank	Wrestler	Nation	Start	Earned	Total
1	Ray Clemons	United States	0	1	1
1	Erich Siebert	Germany	1	0	1
3	Knut Fridell	Sweden	1	1	2
4	Eddie Scarf	Australia	0	2	2
5	Paul Dätwyler	Switzerland	3	0	3
5	August Neo	Estonia	3	0	3
7	Mustafa Avcioglu	Turkey	1	3	4
7	Hubert Prokop	Czechoslovakia	3	1	4
7	Ede Virág-Ébner	Hungary	1	3	4
10	Maurice Beke	Belgium	3	3	6
10	Matti Lahti	Finland	3	3	6
10	Thomas Ward	Great Britain	3	3	6

=== Round 3 ===
Clemons fell from first to fifth with a loss to Neo. Siebert picked up a second point but stayed in the lead along with Fridell. Dätwyler and Neo had 3 points apiece after the third round. The three losers other than Clemons were eliminated, as was Avcioglu, who withdrew.

Bouts

Winner	Nation	Victory Type	Loser	Nation
August Neo	Estonia	Fall	Ray Clemons	United States
Knut Fridell	Sweden	Fall	Ede Virág-Ébner	Hungary
Paul Dätwyler	Switzerland	Fall	Hubert Prokop	Czechoslovakia
Erich Siebert	Germany	Decision, 3–0	Eddie Scarf	Australia
N/A	N/A	Withdrew	Mustafa Avcioglu	Turkey

Points

Rank	Wrestler	Nation	Start	Earned	Total
1	Knut Fridell	Sweden	2	0	2
1	Erich Siebert	Germany	1	1	2
3	Paul Dätwyler	Switzerland	3	0	3
3	August Neo	Estonia	3	0	3
5	Ray Clemons	United States	1	3	4
6	Eddie Scarf	Australia	2	3	5
7	Mustafa Avcioglu	Turkey	4	3	7
7	Hubert Prokop	Czechoslovakia	4	3	7
7	Ede Virág-Ébner	Hungary	4	3	7

=== Round 4 ===
Dätwyler and Clemons were eliminated with losses, leaving three wrestlers in competition. Fridell and Siebert each stayed at 2 points, winning by fall and having a bye, respectively. Neo received his fourth point in the win by decision.

Bouts

Winner	Nation	Victory Type	Loser	Nation
August Neo	Estonia	Decision, 3–0	Paul Dätwyler	Switzerland
Knut Fridell	Sweden	Fall	Ray Clemons	United States
Erich Siebert	Germany	Bye	N/A	N/A

Points

Rank	Wrestler	Nation	Start	Earned	Total
1	Knut Fridell	Sweden	2	0	2
1	Erich Siebert	Germany	2	0	2
3	August Neo	Estonia	3	1	4
4	Paul Dätwyler	Switzerland	3	3	6
5	Ray Clemons	United States	4	3	7

=== Round 5 ===
Fridell had previously defeated Neo, but Siebert had not faced either other wrestler. Fridell received the bye in this round, with Neo and Siebert wrestling. Had Siebert earned fewer than 3 points in the round, another bout would have been contested with Fridell and Siebert facing off. However, Neo defeated Siebert by unanimous decision. This put both wrestlers at 5 points—Neo adding 1 point to his starting 4 and Siebert adding 3 to his 2. Neo earned silver based on the head-to-head result in this round breaking the tie. Fridell won the gold medal.

Bouts

Winner	Nation	Victory Type	Loser	Nation
August Neo	Estonia	Decision, 3–0	Erich Siebert	Germany
Knut Fridell	Sweden	Bye	N/A	N/A

Points

Rank	Wrestler	Nation	Start	Earned	Total
1st place, gold medalist(s)	Knut Fridell	Sweden	2	0	2
2nd place, silver medalist(s)	August Neo	Estonia	4	1	5
3rd place, bronze medalist(s)	Erich Siebert	Germany	2	3	5
