= Wrestling at the 1936 Summer Olympics – Men's Greco-Roman welterweight =

Men's Greco-Roman welterweight at the Games of the XI Olympiad
- Venue: Deutschlandhalle
- Dates: 6–9 August 1936
- Competitors: 14 from 14 nations

Medalists
1st place, gold medalist(s)		Rudolf Svedberg	Sweden
2nd place, silver medalist(s)		Fritz Schäfer	Germany
3rd place, bronze medalist(s)		Eino Virtanen	Finland

The men's Greco-Roman welterweight competition at the 1936 Summer Olympics in Berlin took place from 6 August to 9 August at the Deutschlandhalle. Nations were limited to one competitor. This weight class was limited to wrestlers weighing up to 72kg.

This Greco-Roman wrestling competition continued to use the "bad points" elimination system introduced at the 1928 Summer Olympics, with a slight modification. Each round featured all wrestlers pairing off and wrestling one bout (with one wrestler having a bye if there were an odd number). The loser received 3 points if the loss was by fall or unanimous decision and 2 points if the decision was 2-1 (this was the modification from prior years, where all losses were 3 points). The winner received 1 point if the win was by decision and 0 points if the win was by fall. At the end of each round, any wrestler with at least 5 points was eliminated.

== Schedule ==
Date	Event
6 August 1936	Round 1
7 August 1936	Round 2
8 August 1936	Round 3 Round 4
9 August 1936	Round 5 Round 6 Round 7

== Results ==
=== Round 1 ===
Of the seven bouts, five were won by fall giving the winners 0 points. The two other bouts were by unanimous decision, giving the winners 1 point apiece. All 7 losers received 3 points, as none of the losses was by split decision. Hametner withdrew after the first round.

Bouts

Winner	Nation	Victory Type	Loser	Nation
Silvio Tozzi	Italy	Fall	Dimitrios Zakharias	Greece
Karel Zvonař	Czechoslovakia	Decision, 3–0	Nurettin Baytorun	Turkey
Adolf Rieder	Switzerland	Fall	Maxime Lubat	France
Rudolf Svedberg	Sweden	Fall	Antun Fischer	Yugoslavia
Fritz Schäfer	Germany	Decision, 3–0	Edgar Puusepp	Estonia
Jean de Feu	Belgium	Fall	Franz Hametner	Austria
Eino Virtanen	Finland	Fall	Gyula Vincze	Hungary

Points

Rank	Wrestler	Nation	Start	Earned	Total
1	Jean de Feu	Belgium	0	0	0
1	Adolf Rieder	Switzerland	0	0	0
1	Rudolf Svedberg	Sweden	0	0	0
1	Silvio Tozzi	Italy	0	0	0
1	Eino Virtanen	Finland	0	0	0
6	Fritz Schäfer	Germany	0	1	1
6	Karel Zvonał	Czechoslovakia	0	1	1
8	Nurettin Baytorun	Turkey	0	3	3
8	Antun Fischer	Yugoslavia	0	3	3
8	Maxime Lubat	France	0	3	3
8	Edgar Puusepp	Estonia	0	3	3
8	Gyula Vincze	Hungary	0	3	3
8	Dimitrios Zakharias	Greece	0	3	3
14	Franz Hametner	Austria	0	3	3r

=== Round 2 ===
The number of wrestlers with 0 points dropped from five to two; Virtanen had a bye and Svedberg won by fall again. Tozzi's second win was by decision, giving him 1 point. Schäfer also stayed at 1 point, winning by fal in this round. Three wrestlers ended the round with 3 points (win by fall and loss, in either order). Similarly, three continued to the next round with 4 points (win by decision and loss, in either order). There were three wrestlers who had lost twice in the first two rounds; these men were eliminated.

Bouts

Winner	Nation	Victory Type	Loser	Nation
Nurettin Baytorun	Turkey	Decision, 3–0	Dimitrios Zakharias	Greece
Silvio Tozzi	Italy	Decision, 3–0	Karel Zvonał	Czechoslovakia
Rudolf Svedberg	Sweden	Fall	Maxime Lubat	France
Antun Fischer	Yugoslavia	Decision, 3–0	Adolf Rieder	Switzerland
Fritz Schäfer	Germany	Fall	Jean de Feu	Belgium
Edgar Puusepp	Estonia	Fall	Gyula Vincze	Hungary
Eino Virtanen	Finland	Bye	N/A	N/A

Points

Rank	Wrestler	Nation	Start	Earned	Total
1	Rudolf Svedberg	Sweden	0	0	0
1	Eino Virtanen	Finland	0	0	0
3	Fritz Schäfer	Germany	1	0	1
3	Silvio Tozzi	Italy	0	1	1
5	Jean de Feu	Belgium	0	3	3
5	Edgar Puusepp	Estonia	3	0	3
5	Adolf Rieder	Switzerland	0	3	3
8	Nurettin Baytorun	Turkey	3	1	4
8	Antun Fischer	Yugoslavia	3	1	4
8	Karel Zvonał	Czechoslovakia	1	3	4
11	Maxime Lubat	France	3	3	6
11	Gyula Vincze	Hungary	3	3	6
11	Dimitrios Zakharias	Greece	3	3	6

=== Round 3 ===
All five bouts were won by fall in this round. The winners stayed on the same score as before (two at 0, one each at 1, 3, and 4 points). Tozzi was the only loser in the round to avoid elimination, as the 3 points of the loss moved him only to a total of 4. The other four losers in the round were eliminated.

Bouts

Winner	Nation	Victory Type	Loser	Nation
Eino Virtanen	Finland	Fall	Silvio Tozzi	Italy
Nurettin Baytorun	Turkey	Fall	Adolf Rieder	Switzerland
Rudolf Svedberg	Sweden	Fall	Karel Zvonał	Czechoslovakia
Fritz Schäfer	Germany	Fall	Antun Fischer	Yugoslavia
Edgar Puusepp	Estonia	Fall	Jean de Feu	Belgium

Points

Rank	Wrestler	Nation	Start	Earned	Total
1	Rudolf Svedberg	Sweden	0	0	0
1	Eino Virtanen	Finland	0	0	0
3	Fritz Schäfer	Germany	1	0	1
4	Edgar Puusepp	Estonia	3	0	3
5	Nurettin Baytorun	Turkey	4	0	4
5	Silvio Tozzi	Italy	1	3	4
7	Jean de Feu	Belgium	3	3	6
7	Adolf Rieder	Switzerland	3	3	6
9	Antun Fischer	Yugoslavia	4	3	7
9	Karel Zvonał	Czechoslovakia	4	3	7

=== Round 4 ===
Svedberg and Virtanen each picked up their first point, winning by decision. Schäfer stayed at 1 point, winning by fall. The three losers in the round were each eliminated. This left three remaining wrestlers, none of whom had faced each other and each of whom had 1 point. This effectively turned the remaining competition into a round-robin. The official report places Baytorun 5th and Tozzi 6th.

Bouts

Winner	Nation	Victory Type	Loser	Nation
Eino Virtanen	Finland	Decision, 3–0	Nurettin Baytorun	Turkey
Fritz Schäfer	Germany	Fall	Silvio Tozzi	Italy
Rudolf Svedberg	Sweden	Decision, 3–0	Edgar Puusepp	Estonia

Points

Rank	Wrestler	Nation	Start	Earned	Total
1	Fritz Schäfer	Germany	1	0	1
1	Rudolf Svedberg	Sweden	0	1	1
1	Eino Virtanen	Finland	0	1	1
4	Edgar Puusepp	Estonia	3	3	6
5	Nurettin Baytorun	Turkey	4	3	7
6	Silvio Tozzi	Italy	4	3	7

=== Round 5 ===
Svedberg and Virtanen were the first pair to compete, with Svedberg winning by decision.

Bouts

Winner	Nation	Victory Type	Loser	Nation
Rudolf Svedberg	Sweden	Decision, 3–0	Eino Virtanen	Finland
Fritz Schäfer	Germany	Bye	N/A	N/A

Points

Rank	Wrestler	Nation	Start	Earned	Total
1	Fritz Schäfer	Germany	1	0	1
2	Rudolf Svedberg	Sweden	1	1	2
3	Eino Virtanen	Finland	1	3	4

=== Round 6 ===
Round 6 was the second pairing among the group of medalists. Virtanen again was up, this time against Schäfer. Virtanen again lost, finishing with the bronze medal.

Bouts

Winner	Nation	Victory Type	Loser	Nation
Fritz Schäfer	Germany	Fall	Eino Virtanen	Finland
Rudolf Svedberg	Sweden	Bye	N/A	N/A

Points

Rank	Wrestler	Nation	Start	Earned	Total
1	Fritz Schäfer	Germany	1	0	1
2	Rudolf Svedberg	Sweden	2	0	2
3rd place, bronze medalist(s)	Eino Virtanen	Finland	4	3	7

=== Round 7 ===
In the de facto gold medal final, Svedberg defeated Schäfer by split decision to take the Olympic victory. Each man had 3 points, but the result of this round was itself the head-to-head tie-breaker that gave Svedberg the gold.

Bouts

Winner	Nation	Victory Type	Loser	Nation
Rudolf Svedberg	Sweden	Decision, 2–1	Fritz Schäfer	Germany

Points

Rank	Wrestler	Nation	Start	Earned	Total
1st place, gold medalist(s)	Rudolf Svedberg	Sweden	2	1	3
2nd place, silver medalist(s)	Fritz Schäfer	Germany	1	2	3
