= Wrestling at the 1936 Summer Olympics – Men's Greco-Roman lightweight =

Men's Greco-Roman lightweight at the Games of the XI Olympiad
- Venue: Deutschlandhalle
- Dates: 6–9 August 1936
- Competitors: 18 from 18 nations

Medalists
1st place, gold medalist(s)		Lauri Koskela	Finland
2nd place, silver medalist(s)		Jozef Herda	Czechoslovakia
3rd place, bronze medalist(s)		Voldemar Väli	Estonia

The men's Greco-Roman lightweight competition at the 1936 Summer Olympics in Berlin took place from 6 August to 9 August at the Deutschlandhalle. Nations were limited to one competitor. This weight class was limited to wrestlers weighing up to 66kg.

This Greco-Roman wrestling competition continued to use the "bad points" elimination system introduced at the 1928 Summer Olympics, with a slight modification. Each round featured all wrestlers pairing off and wrestling one bout (with one wrestler having a bye if there were an odd number). The loser received 3 points if the loss was by fall or unanimous decision and 2 points if the decision was 2-1 (this was the modification from prior years, where all losses were 3 points). The winner received 1 point if the win was by decision and 0 points if the win was by fall. At the end of each round, any wrestler with at least 5 points was eliminated.

== Schedule ==
Date	Event
6 August 1936	Round 1
7 August 1936	Round 2
8 August 1936	Round 3 Round 4
9 August 1936	Round 5 Round 6 Round 7

== Results ==
=== Round 1 ===
Four wrestlers made it through the first round with 0 bad points with wins by fall. The five other winners by decision each received 1 point. Three of those decisions were split decisions, with the losers earning 2 points. The other two decisions, and the four bouts determined by fall, resulted in six men finishing the round with 3 points. Of that last group, Scheitler was injured and unable to continue.

Bouts

Winner	Nation	Victory Type	Loser	Nation
Alberto Molfino	Italy	Fall	Sotirios Vatanidis	Greece
Herbert Olofsson	Sweden	Decision, 3–0	Josef Grahsl	Austria
Zbigniew Szajewski	Poland	Decision, 2–1	Imam Hassan Ali	Egypt
Aage Meyer	Denmark	Fall	Metty Scheitler	Luxembourg
Voldemar Väli	Estonia	Fall	Arild Dahl	Norway
Lauri Koskela	Finland	Decision, 2–1	Heini Nettesheim	Germany
Saim Arikan	Turkey	Decision, 3–0	Adolphe Osselaer	Belgium
Filip Borlovan	Romania	Decision, 2–1	József Kálmán	Hungary
Jozef Herda	Czechoslovakia	Fall	Oskar Holinger	Switzerland

Points

Rank	Wrestler	Nation	Start	Earned	Total
1	Jozef Herda	Czechoslovakia	0	0	0
1	Aage Meyer	Denmark	0	0	0
1	Alberto Molfino	Italy	0	0	0
1	Voldemar Väli	Estonia	0	0	0
5	Saim Arikan	Turkey	0	1	1
5	Filip Borlovan	Romania	0	1	1
5	Lauri Koskela	Finland	0	1	1
5	Herbert Olofsson	Sweden	0	1	1
5	Zbigniew Szajewski	Poland	0	1	1
10	Imam Hassan Ali	Egypt	0	2	2
10	József Kálmán	Hungary	0	2	2
10	Heini Nettesheim	Germany	0	2	2
13	Arild Dahl	Norway	0	3	3
13	Josef Grahsl	Austria	0	3	3
13	Oskar Holinger	Switzerland	0	3	3
13	Adolphe Osselaer	Belgium	0	3	3
13	Sotirios Vatanidis	Greece	0	3	3
18	Metty Scheitler	Luxembourg	0	3	3r

=== Round 2 ===
No wrestler was able to maintain a 0-point score through the second round. Four finished the round with 1 point (one win by fall, one win by decision). Borlovan had 2 points (both wins by decision). Five men had achieved 3 points, by various means; three had 4 points. Half of the eight bouts eliminated the losers with a second loss.

Bouts

Winner	Nation	Victory Type	Loser	Nation
Herbert Olofsson	Sweden	Fall	Alberto Molfino	Italy
Josef Grahsl	Austria	Decision, 2–1	Sotirios Vatanidis	Greece
Imam Hassan Ali	Egypt	Decision, 3–0	Aage Meyer	Denmark
Arild Dahl	Norway	Decision, 3–0	Zbigniew Szajewski	Poland
Voldemar Väli	Estonia	Decision, 3–0	Heini Nettesheim	Germany
Lauri Koskela	Finland	Fall	Adolphe Osselaer	Belgium
Filip Borlovan	Romania	Decision, 2–1	Saim Arikan	Turkey
Jozef Herda	Czechoslovakia	Decision, 3–0	József Kálmán	Hungary
Oskar Holinger	Switzerland	Bye	N/A	N/A

Points

Rank	Wrestler	Nation	Start	Earned	Total
1	Jozef Herda	Czechoslovakia	0	1	1
1	Lauri Koskela	Finland	1	0	1
1	Herbert Olofsson	Sweden	1	0	1
1	Voldemar Väli	Estonia	0	1	1
5	Filip Borlovan	Romania	1	1	2
6	Imam Hassan Ali	Egypt	2	1	3
6	Saim Arikan	Turkey	1	2	3
6	Oskar Holinger	Switzerland	3	0	3
6	Aage Meyer	Denmark	0	3	3
6	Alberto Molfino	Italy	0	3	3
11	Arild Dahl	Norway	3	1	4
11	Josef Grahsl	Austria	3	1	4
11	Zbigniew Szajewski	Poland	1	3	4
14	József Kálmán	Hungary	2	3	5
14	Heini Nettesheim	Germany	2	3	5
14	Sotirios Vatanidis	Greece	3	2	5
17	Adolphe Osselaer	Belgium	3	3	6

=== Round 3 ===
Herda and Koskela continued in the lead with 1 point each, winning by bye or fall to maintain their scores. The other two men who started the round with one point each won by decision, moving to 2 points. Molfino was the only one of the wrestlers who started with 3 points to win (by fall, staying at 3 points); the other four were eliminated after losing in this round. The wrestlers who started with 4 points fared better, with two winning by fall to stay alive, one losing to be eliminated, and none suffering the misfortune of being eliminated by winning via decision. Borlovan, who started the round with 2 points, was eliminated by Koskela in a loss by fall.

Bouts

Winner	Nation	Victory Type	Loser	Nation
Alberto Molfino	Italy	Fall	Oskar Holinger	Switzerland
Herbert Olofsson	Sweden	Decision, 3–0	Imam Hassan Ali	Egypt
Zbigniew Szajewski	Poland	Fall	Josef Grahsl	Austria
Arild Dahl	Norway	Fall	Aage Meyer	Denmark
Voldemar Väli	Estonia	Decision, 3–0	Saim Arikan	Turkey
Lauri Koskela	Finland	Fall	Filip Borlovan	Romania
Jozef Herda	Czechoslovakia	Bye	N/A	N/A

Points

Rank	Wrestler	Nation	Start	Earned	Total
1	Jozef Herda	Czechoslovakia	1	0	1
1	Lauri Koskela	Finland	1	0	1
3	Herbert Olofsson	Sweden	1	1	2
3	Voldemar Väli	Estonia	1	1	2
5	Alberto Molfino	Italy	3	0	3
6	Arild Dahl	Norway	4	0	4
6	Zbigniew Szajewski	Poland	4	0	4
8	Filip Borlovan	Romania	2	3	5
9	Imam Hassan Ali	Egypt	3	3	6
9	Saim Arikan	Turkey	3	3	6
9	Oskar Holinger	Switzerland	3	3	6
9	Aage Meyer	Denmark	3	3	6
13	Josef Grahsl	Austria	4	3	7

=== Round 4 ===
The top four wrestlers coming into the round either won by fall or had a bye and therefore there was no change to their scores of 1 or 2 points. The bottom three wrestlers each lost by fall and were eliminated. The official report awards Dahl 6th place, so Szajewski takes 7th by default.

Bouts

Winner	Nation	Victory Type	Loser	Nation
Jozef Herda	Czechoslovakia	Fall	Alberto Molfino	Italy
Herbert Olofsson	Sweden	Fall	Arild Dahl	Norway
Voldemar Väli	Estonia	Fall	Zbigniew Szajewski	Poland
Lauri Koskela	Finland	Bye	N/A	N/A

Points

Rank	Wrestler	Nation	Start	Earned	Total
1	Jozef Herda	Czechoslovakia	1	0	1
1	Lauri Koskela	Finland	1	0	1
3	Herbert Olofsson	Sweden	2	0	2
3	Voldemar Väli	Estonia	2	0	2
5	Alberto Molfino	Italy	3	3	6
6	Arild Dahl	Norway	4	3	7
7	Zbigniew Szajewski	Poland	4	3	7

=== Round 5 ===
The bout between Koskela and Herda matched up a pair of wrestlers who started with 1 point and thus neither could be eliminated; Koskela took a split decision, resulting in him advancing with 2 points and Herda going to 3 points. Väli and Olofsson each started with 2 points, meaning a fall or unanimous decision would eliminate the loser but a split decision would not. Väli won by fall, staying at 2 points and eliminating Olofsson.

Bouts

Winner	Nation	Victory Type	Loser	Nation
Lauri Koskela	Finland	Decision, 2–1	Jozef Herda	Czechoslovakia
Voldemar Väli	Estonia	Fall	Herbert Olofsson	Sweden

Points

Rank	Wrestler	Nation	Start	Earned	Total
1	Lauri Koskela	Finland	1	1	2
1	Voldemar Väli	Estonia	2	0	2
3	Jozef Herda	Czechoslovakia	1	2	3
4	Herbert Olofsson	Sweden	2	3	5

=== Round 6 ===
Koskela defeated Väli to secure the gold medal. The split decision kept Väli from elimination at 4 points (a fall or unanimous decision would have given Väli 5, eliminating him and ending the competition after this round with Herda as the silver medalist). Koskela and Herda finished the round at 3 points each, but Koskela had already defeated Herda in round 5 and thus held the tie-breaker even if Herda made it through his bout with Väli in the next round without earning any more bad points.

Bouts

Winner	Nation	Victory Type	Loser	Nation
Lauri Koskela	Finland	Decision, 2–1	Voldemar Väli	Estonia
Jozef Herda	Czechoslovakia	Bye	N/A	N/A

Points

Rank	Wrestler	Nation	Start	Earned	Total
1st place, gold medalist(s)	Lauri Koskela	Finland	2	1	3
2	Jozef Herda	Czechoslovakia	3	0	3
3	Voldemar Väli	Estonia	2	2	4

=== Round 7 ===
The round 7 bout between Väli and Herda was for silver and bronze. Herda prevailed by decision.

Bouts

Winner	Nation	Victory Type	Loser	Nation
Jozef Herda	Czechoslovakia	Decision, 3–0	Voldemar Väli	Estonia

Points

Rank	Wrestler	Nation	Start	Earned	Total
2nd place, silver medalist(s)	Jozef Herda	Czechoslovakia	3	1	4
3rd place, bronze medalist(s)	Voldemar Väli	Estonia	4	3	7
