= Wrestling at the 1936 Summer Olympics – Men's freestyle heavyweight =

Men's freestyle heavyweight at the Games of the XI Olympiad
- Venue: Deutschlandhalle
- Dates: 3–4 August 1936
- Competitors: 11 from 11 nations

Medalists
1st place, gold medalist(s)		Kristjan Palusalu	Estonia
2nd place, silver medalist(s)		Josef Klapuch	Czechoslovakia
3rd place, bronze medalist(s)		Hjalmar Nyström	Finland

The men's freestyle heavyweight competition at the 1936 Summer Olympics in Berlin took place from 3 August to 4 August at the Deutschlandhalle. Nations were limited to one competitor. This weight class allowed wrestlers over 87kg.

This freestyle wrestling competition continued to use the "bad points" elimination system introduced at the 1928 Summer Olympics for Greco-Roman and at the 1932 Summer Olympics for freestyle wrestling, with a slight modification. Each round featured all wrestlers pairing off and wrestling one bout (with one wrestler having a bye if there were an odd number). The loser received 3 points if the loss was by fall or unanimous decision and 2 points if the decision was 2-1 (this was the modification from prior years, where all losses were 3 points). The winner received 1 point if the win was by decision and 0 points if the win was by fall. At the end of each round, any wrestler with at least 5 points was eliminated.

== Schedule ==
Date	Event
3 August 1936	Round 1
4 August 1936	Round 2 Round 3 Round 4 Round 5

== Results ==
=== Round 1 ===
Of the winners, three won by fall and advanced with 0 points (as did Herland, who had a bye) while two won by decision and moved to the second round with 1 point. Of the losers, Gehring lost by split decision and received 2 points while the other five received 3 points for losses by fall or unanimous decision.

Bouts

Winner	Nation	Victory Type	Loser	Nation
Kristjan Palusalu	Estonia	Fall	Josef Klapuch	Czechoslovakia
Mehmet Çoban	Turkey	Decision, 3–0	Léon Charlier	Belgium
Willy Bürki	Switzerland	Decision, 2–1	Georg Gehring	Germany
Nils Åkerlindh	Sweden	Fall	Roy Dunn	United States
Hjalmar Nyström	Finland	Fall	George Chiga	Canada
Robert Herland	France	Bye	N/A	N/A

Points

Rank	Wrestler	Nation	Start	Earned	Total
1	Nils Akerlindh	Sweden	0	0	0
1	Robert Herland	France	0	0	0
1	Hjalmar Nyström	Finland	0	0	0
1	Kristjan Palusalu	Estonia	0	0	0
5	Willy Bürki	Switzerland	0	1	1
5	Mehmet Çoban	Turkey	0	1	1
7	Georg Gehring	Germany	0	2	2
8	Léon Charlier	Belgium	0	3	3
8	George Chiga	Canada	0	3	3
8	Roy Dunn	United States	0	3	3
8	Josef Klapuch	Czechoslovakia	0	3	3

=== Round 2 ===
The four men who started the round with 0 points all ended with a different number of points: Palusalu won by fall, staying at 0; Akerlindh won by decision, earning 1 point; Nyström lost by split decision, accumulating 2 points; and Herland lost by fall, getting 3 points. With four of the five bouts ending by fall, Bürki stayed at 1 point, Gehring stayed at 2, and Klapuch stayed at 3 (as did Chiga, who had a bye). Çoban's loss moved him to 4 points; Charlier's and Dunn's eliminated them.

Bouts

Winner	Nation	Victory Type	Loser	Nation
Kristjan Palusalu	Estonia	Fall	Robert Herland	France
Josef Klapuch	Czechoslovakia	Fall	Léon Charlier	Belgium
Georg Gehring	Germany	Fall	Mehmet Çoban	Turkey
Willy Bürki	Switzerland	Fall	Roy Dunn	United States
Nils Akerlindh	Sweden	Decision, 2–1	Hjalmar Nyström	Finland
George Chiga	Canada	Bye	N/A	N/A

Points

Rank	Wrestler	Nation	Start	Earned	Total
1	Kristjan Palusalu	Estonia	0	0	0
2	Nils Akerlindh	Sweden	0	1	1
2	Willy Bürki	Switzerland	1	0	1
4	Georg Gehring	Germany	2	0	2
4	Hjalmar Nyström	Finland	0	2	2
6	George Chiga	Canada	3	0	3
6	Robert Herland	France	0	3	3
6	Josef Klapuch	Czechoslovakia	3	0	3
9	Mehmet Çoban	Turkey	1	3	4
10	Léon Charlier	Belgium	3	3	6
11	Roy Dunn	United States	3	3	6

=== Round 3 ===
Palusalu picked up his first point, winning by decision to eliminate Çoban. Akerlindh also finished the round with 1 point, defeating Bürki (who stayed in competition with 4 points) by fall. Nyström stayed at 2 points with a bye; Herland stayed at 3 with a win by fall. Klapuch received his fourth point. Gehring and Chiga were eliminated.

Bouts

Winner	Nation	Victory Type	Loser	Nation
Robert Herland	France	Fall	George Chiga	Canada
Kristjan Palusalu	Estonia	Decision, 3–0	Mehmet Çoban	Turkey
Josef Klapuch	Czechoslovakia	Decision, 3–0	Georg Gehring	Germany
Nils Akerlindh	Sweden	Fall	Willy Bürki	Switzerland
Hjalmar Nyström	Finland	Bye	N/A	N/A

Points

Rank	Wrestler	Nation	Start	Earned	Total
1	Kristjan Palusalu	Estonia	0	1	1
1	Nils Akerlindh	Sweden	1	0	1
3	Hjalmar Nyström	Finland	2	0	2
4	Robert Herland	France	3	0	3
5	Willy Bürki	Switzerland	1	3	4
5	Josef Klapuch	Czechoslovakia	3	1	4
7	Georg Gehring	Germany	2	3	5
8	George Chiga	Canada	3	3	6
9	Mehmet Çoban	Turkey	4	3	7

=== Round 4 ===
All three bouts were won by fall, with the winners staying on their starting point totals (Palusalu at 1, Nyström at 2, Klapuch at 4). The loss was not enough to eliminate Akerlindh, who started with 1 point and ended with 4; he withdrew after the round anyway. Herland and Bürki, however, were eliminated.

Bouts

Winner	Nation	Victory Type	Loser	Nation
Hjalmar Nyström	Finland	Fall	Robert Herland	France
Kristjan Palusalu	Estonia	Fall	Willy Bürki	Switzerland
Josef Klapuch	Czechoslovakia	Fall	Nils Akerlindh	Sweden

Points

Rank	Wrestler	Nation	Start	Earned	Total
1	Kristjan Palusalu	Estonia	1	0	1
2	Hjalmar Nyström	Finland	2	0	2
3	Josef Klapuch	Czechoslovakia	4	0	4
4	Nils Akerlindh	Sweden	1	3	4r
5	Robert Herland	France	3	3	6
6	Willy Bürki	Switzerland	4	3	7

=== Round 5 ===
Palusalu had previously defeated Klapuch, but Nyström had not faced either other wrestler. Klapuch received the bye in this round, with Nyström and Palusalu wrestling. Had Nyström earned fewer than 3 points in the round, another bout would have been contested with Nyström and Klapuch facing off.

Klapuch could not earn the gold medal regardless of the result. A Palusalu win would result in him taking gold with fewer points than either other remaining wrestler and no possible bouts left for the Estonian. A Palusalu loss by split decision would still place him at fewer points than Klapuch, keeping Klapuch from the gold. Even a Palusalu loss by fall or unanimous decision, leaving Palusalu and Klapuch tied on points, would not be enough for Klapuch, as Palusalu had the head-to-head tie-breaker.

Nyström still had a chance at the gold medal. A win by fall or unanimous decision over Palusalu followed by any win over Klapuch would earn gold for Nyström. A win by split decision over Palusalu would leave the men tied on points and give Nyström the head-to-head tie-breaker, but Nyström would still need to face Klapuch and therefore would need to go scoreless in that final bout—that is, win by fall, to take the gold.

Palusalu defeated Nyström by unanimous decision. This gave Nyström 5 points, eliminating him with the bronze medal. Klapuch and Palusalu were not eliminated, but could not face each other again, so the competition was over with Palusalu taking gold with 2 points and Klapuch silver with 4.

Bouts

Winner	Nation	Victory Type	Loser	Nation
Kristjan Palusalu	Estonia	Decision, 3–0	Hjalmar Nyström	Finland
Josef Klapuch	Czechoslovakia	Bye	N/A	N/A

Points

Rank	Wrestler	Nation	Start	Earned	Total
1st place, gold medalist(s)	Kristjan Palusalu	Estonia	1	1	2
2nd place, silver medalist(s)	Josef Klapuch	Czechoslovakia	4	0	4
3rd place, bronze medalist(s)	Hjalmar Nyström	Finland	2	3	5
