= Oskar Holinger =

Swiss wrestler (born 1918)

Personal information
- Nationality: Swiss
- Born: 22 July 1918 Basel, Switzerland

Sport
- Sport: Wrestling

Oskar Holinger (born 22 July 1918, date of death unknown) was a Swiss wrestler. He competed in the men's Greco-Roman lightweight at the 1936 Summer Olympics.

== Wrestling at the 1936 Summer Olympics ==
Event	Preliminary rounds			Final ranking
Event	Opponent I	Opponent II	Opponent III	Place
Lightweight, Greco-Roman	(Czechoslovakia) Jozef Herda (TCH); L	Bye; W	(Kingdom of Italy) Alberto Molfino (ITA); L	9th
