= Roolaid =

Family name

Roolaid is an Estonian surname. Notable people with the surname include:

- Boris Roolaid (1917–c.1942), Estonian swimmer
- Egon Roolaid (1918–c.1943), Estonian swimmer, brother of Boris
- Virve Roolaid (born 1933), Estonian javelin thrower
