= Antun Fischer =

Serbian wrestler

Personal information
- Nationality: Serbian
- Born: 12 April 1911 Szabadka, Kingdom of Hungary, Austria-Hungary
- Died: 27 July 1985 (aged 74) Subotica, SR Serbia, SFR Yugoslavia

Sport
- Sport: Wrestling

Antun Fischer (Serbian: Антун Фишер, romanized: Antun Fišer; 12 April 1911 – 27 July 1985) was a Serbian wrestler. He competed in the men's Greco-Roman welterweight at the 1936 Summer Olympics.
