= Roy Dunn =

Roy Dunn may refer to:

- Roy Dunn (wrestler) (1910–2000), American wrestler
- Roy Emery Dunn (1886–1985), American businessman and politician
