= Hubert Prokop =

Hubert Prokop may refer to:

- Hubert Prokop (basketball)
- Hubert Prokop (wrestler)
