= Argast =

Argast is a surname. Notable people with the surname include:

- Ed Argast, American football coach and player
- Georg Argast (1899–?), Swiss wrestler
