= Imam Hassan Ali =

Egyptian wrestler

Personal information
- Nationality: Egyptian
- Born: 12 August 1911

Sport
- Sport: Wrestling

Imam Hassan Ali (born 12 August 1911, date of death unknown) was an Egyptian wrestler. He competed in the men's Greco-Roman lightweight at the 1936 Summer Olympics.
