= Filip Borlovan =

Romanian wrestler

Personal information
- Nationality: Romanian
- Born: 25 November 1909
- Died: 1980 (aged 70–71)

Sport
- Sport: Wrestling

Filip Borlovan (25 November 1909 – 1980) was a Romanian wrestler. He competed in the men's Greco-Roman lightweight at the 1936 Summer Olympics.
