= Adolf Rieder =

Swiss wrestler

Personal information
- Nationality: Swiss
- Born: 30 January 1915

Sport
- Sport: Wrestling

Adolf Rieder (born 30 January 1915, date of death unknown) was a Swiss wrestler. He competed in the men's Greco-Roman welterweight at the 1936 Summer Olympics.
