= Joseph Reid (wrestler) =

British wrestler (1905–1968)

Personal information
- Nationality: British (English)
- Born: 17 March 1905 Leigh, Lancashire, England
- Died: 8 February 1968 (aged 62)

Sport
- Sport: Wrestling
- Club: Leigh Athletic Club
Medal record
Men's freestyle wrestling
Representing the Great Britain
European Championships
Bronze medal – third place	1933 Paris	56 kg
Representing England
British Empire Games
Silver medal – second place	1930 Hamilton	56 kg
Bronze medal – third place	1934 London	56 kg

Joseph Reid (17 March 1905 – 8 February 1968) was an English wrestler. In freestyle wrestling, he was a six-time British champion at the British Wrestling Championships, a two-time British Empire Games medallist, European Championships bronze medallist, and represented Great Britain at the 1932 Summer Olympics. Reid was also a champion in Lancashire catch-as-catch-can wrestling.

== Biography ==
Reid was born in Leigh, Lancashire and worked as a collier. Trained by fellow Leigh native, Harry Pennington, Reid became skilled in amateur and catch wrestling. He was a champion in Lancashire style wrestling (9 stone) and a six-time British bantamweight champion (58 kg) from 1930–1935.

In 1932, Reid competed in the freestyle bantamweight tournament of the Olympic Games. He was eliminated after losing two of his three matches in the freestyle bantamweight division and finished fifth over all.

At the 1930 Empire Games, Reid won the silver medal in the bantamweight class. He placed third at the 1933 European Championships and at the 1934 Empire Games. Shortly afterwards, he turned professional and continued wrestling well into the 1960s.

Reid served in the Second World War, and spent time as a prisoner of war in a Japanese-run internment camp. He later helped to train Scottish wrestler George Kidd. Reid's wrestling boots are now on display at the Leigh Harriers athletic club.
