= Dimitrios Zakharias =

Greek wrestler

Personal information
- Nationality: Greek
- Born: 1910

Sport
- Sport: Wrestling

Dimitrios Zakharias (born 1910, date of death unknown) was a Greek wrestler. He competed in the men's Greco-Roman welterweight at the 1936 Summer Olympics.
