= Sotirios Vatanidis =

Greek wrestler (born 1914)

Personal information
- Nationality: Greek
- Born: 1914

Sport
- Sport: Wrestling

Sotirios Vatanidis (born 1914, date of death unknown) was a Greek wrestler. He competed in the men's Greco-Roman lightweight at the 1936 Summer Olympics.
