= Adolphe Osselaer =

Belgian wrestler

Personal information
- Nationality: Belgian
- Born: 14 December 1912
- Died: 5 january 1955 in a car accident Afsnee near Ghent

Sport
- Sport: Wrestling

Adolphe Osselaer (born 14 December 1912, died in a car accident in Afsnee near Ghent on January 5, 1955) was a Belgian wrestler. He competed in the men's Greco-Roman lightweight at the 1936 Summer Olympics.
