= Matti Lahti =

Finnish wrestler

Personal information
- Nationality: Finnish
- Born: 23 April 1905 Isokyrö, Finland
- Died: 12 April 1970 (aged 64) Isokyrö, Finland

Sport
- Sport: Wrestling

Matti Lahti (23 April 1905 – 12 April 1970) was a Finnish wrestler. He competed in the men's freestyle light heavyweight at the 1936 Summer Olympics.
