= Eino Virtanen (wrestler) =

Finnish wrestler (1908–1980)

Eino Mauno Virtanen (19 August 1908 in Uskela – 3 December 1980 in Helsinki) was a Finnish wrestler who took part in the 1936 Olympic Games in Berlin and 1948 Games in London.

Virtanen won an Olympic bronze in wrestling at the 1936 Summer Olympics in Berlin. He came in third in the welterweight class up to 72.0 kg, in Greco-Roman style, behind Rudolf Svedberg from Sweden and Fritz Schäfer from Germany.

Virtanen became European champion in wrestling in 1946 in Stockholm.

== Olympic medals ==
- 1936 Berlin - Bronze in wrestling, Greco-Roman style, welterweight Finland
