= Josef Grahsl =

Austrian wrestler

Personal information
- Nationality: Austrian
- Born: 2 May 1908
- Died: 14 September 1981 (aged 73)

Sport
- Sport: Wrestling

Josef Grahsl (2 May 1908 – 14 September 1981) was an Austrian wrestler. He competed in the men's Greco-Roman lightweight at the 1936 Summer Olympics.
