= George Chiga =

Canadian wrestler

Personal information
- Born: 28 October 1913 Regina, Saskatchewan, Canada
- Died: 8 December 2007 (aged 94) Tulsa, Oklahoma, U.S.

Sport
- Sport: Wrestling
- Events: Freestyle and Folkstyle
- College team: Oklahoma A&M
- Coached by: Edward C. Gallagher
Medal record
Collegiate Wrestling
Representing Oklahoma A&M
NCAA Championships
| Silver medal – second place | 1940 Champaign | Heavyweight |

George Chiga (28 October 1913 – 8 December 2007) was a Canadian wrestler. He competed in the men's freestyle heavyweight at the 1936 Summer Olympics.
