= Maxime Lubat =

French wrestler

Personal information
- Nationality: French
- Born: 6 June 1914

Sport
- Sport: Wrestling

Maxime Lubat (6 June 1914 - 1942) was a French wrestler. He competed in the men's Greco-Roman welterweight at the 1936 Summer Olympics.
