= Karel Zvonař =

Czech wrestler

Personal information
- Nationality: Czech
- Born: 25 October 1912
- Died: February 1994 Prague, Czech Republic

Sport
- Sport: Wrestling

Karel Zvonař (25 October 1912 – February 1994) was a Czech wrestler. He competed in the men's Greco-Roman welterweight at the 1936 Summer Olympics.
