= Harry Pennington (wrestler) =

British wrestler

Personal information
- Born: 20 August 1902 Leigh, England
- Died: 11 April 1995 (aged 92) Leigh, England

Sport
- Sport: Amateur wrestling

Harry Pennington (20 August 1902 – 11 April 1995) was a British amateur wrestler in the 1920s.

== Biography ==
In 1926, Pennington was the bantamweight freestyle champion of Great Britain after winning the title at the British Wrestling Championships.

He also taught Joe Reid and was the inaugural winner of the Lancashire Championship in 1925.

By profession Pennington was a miner and was selected to represent England against France in February 1927 and defeated the French wrestler Dueayla in match where he was the only British winner.
