= František Mráček =

Czech wrestler

Personal information
- Nationality: Czech
- Born: 13 April 1914

Sport
- Sport: Wrestling

František Mráček (born 13 April 1914, date of death unknown) was a Czech wrestler. He competed in the men's Greco-Roman light heavyweight at the 1936 Summer Olympics.
