= Franz Hametner =

Austrian wrestler

Personal information
- Nationality: Austrian
- Born: 15 November 1900

Sport
- Sport: Wrestling

Franz Hametner (born 15 November 1900, date of death unknown) was an Austrian wrestler. He competed in the men's Greco-Roman welterweight at the 1936 Summer Olympics.
