= Maurice Beke =

Belgian wrestler

Personal information
- Nationality: Belgian
- Born: 1 November 1907

Sport
- Sport: Wrestling

Maurice Beke (1 November 1907 – 15 July 1993) was a Belgian wrestler. He competed in the men's freestyle light heavyweight at the 1936 Summer Olympics.
