= József Kálmán =

Hungarian wrestler (1910–?)

Personal information
- Nationality: Hungarian
- Born: 1 March 1910

Sport
- Sport: Wrestling

József Kálmán (born 1 March 1910, date of death unknown) was a Hungarian wrestler. He competed in the men's Greco-Roman lightweight at the 1936 Summer Olympics.
