= Jean Houdry =

French wrestler

Personal information
- Full name: Jean Daniel Houdry
- Nationality: French
- Born: 23 February 1914 Nanterre, France
- Died: 10 January 1994 (aged 79) Nanterre, France

Sport
- Sport: Wrestling

Jean Daniel Houdry (23 February 1914 – 10 January 1994) was a French wrestler. He competed in the men's Greco-Roman light heavyweight at the 1936 Summer Olympics.
