= Peter Larsen (wrestler) =

Danish wrestler (1904–1985)

Personal information
- Nationality: Danish
- Born: 4 March 1904 Guldborgsund, Denmark
- Died: 13 November 1985 (aged 81) Guldborgsund, Denmark

Sport
- Sport: Wrestling

Peter Larsen (4 March 1904 – 13 November 1985) was a Danish wrestler. He competed in the men's Greco-Roman heavyweight at the 1936 Summer Olympics.
