= Jean de Feu =

Belgian wrestler

Personal information
- Nationality: Belgian
- Born: 23 December 1910

Sport
- Sport: Wrestling

Jean de Feu (23 December 1910 – 20 January 2004) was a Belgian wrestler. He competed in the men's Greco-Roman welterweight at the 1936 Summer Olympics.
