= Stevan Nađ =

Yugoslav wrestler (1903–1982)

- Born: 23 July 1903
- Died: 15 December 1982 (aged 79)

Stevan Nađ (23 July 1903 – 15 December 1982) was a Yugoslav wrestler. He competed at the 1924 and the 1936 Summer Olympics.
