= Ede Virág-Ébner =

Hungarian wrestler

Personal information
- Nationality: Hungarian
- Born: 12 August 1912 Budapest, Austria-Hungary
- Died: 22 October 1951 (aged 39) Thessaloniki, Greece

Sport
- Sport: Wrestling

Ede Virág-Ébner (12 August 1912 – 22 October 1951) was a Hungarian wrestler. He competed in the men's freestyle light heavyweight at the 1936 Summer Olympics.

Virag was also a professional wrestler working in Hungary, Germany, France, Switzerland, and for the National Wrestling Alliance in North America. He worked in Canada, New York City, Mid-Atlantic, St. Louis, Minnesota, Chicago and Kansas.
