= Robert Herland =

French wrestler

Personal information
- Nationality: French
- Born: 10 May 1910

Sport
- Sport: Wrestling

Robert Herland (3 November 1909 – 10 March 1984) was a French wrestler. He competed in the men's freestyle heavyweight at the 1936 Summer Olympics.
