= Ray Clemons (wrestler) =

American wrestler (1912–1980)

Personal information
- Born: June 4, 1912 East Duke, Oklahoma, U.S.
- Died: November 26, 1980 (aged 68) Lincoln Park, Michigan, U.S.

Sport
- Country: United States
- Sport: Wrestling
- Events: Freestyle and Folkstyle
- College team: Central Oklahoma
- Team: USA
Medal record
Collegiate Wrestling
Representing the Central Oklahoma Bronchos
NCAA Championships
Gold medal – first place	1936 Lexington	191 lb

Ray Clemons (June 4, 1912 – November 26, 1980) was an American wrestler and professional football player. He competed in the men's freestyle light heavyweight at the 1936 Summer Olympics. Clemons won the NCAA Championship in wrestling at 191 pounds in 1936. He also played professional football for the Detroit Lions in 1939.
