= Nils Åkerlindh =

Swedish wrestler

Personal information
- Nationality: Swedish
- Born: 31 April 1913 Stockholm, Sweden
- Died: 23 April 1992 (aged 79) Stockholm, Sweden

Sport
- Sport: Wrestling

Nils Åkerlindh (31 March 1913 – 23 April 1992) was a Swedish wrestler. He competed in the men's freestyle heavyweight at the 1936 Summer Olympics.
