= Zoltan Kondorossy =

Romanian wrestler

Personal information
- Nationality: Romanian
- Born: 28 January 1906 Arad, Romania
- Died: 4 December 1979 (aged 73)

Sport
- Sport: Wrestling

Zoltan Kondorossy (28 January 1906 – 4 December 1979) was a Romanian wrestler. He competed in the men's Greco-Roman heavyweight at the 1936 Summer Olympics.
