= Silvio Tozzi =

Italian wrestler

Personal information
- Nationality: Italian
- Born: 14 April 1908 Piombino Dese, Italy
- Died: 31 January 1986 (aged 77) Pietra Ligure

Sport
- Sport: Wrestling

Silvio Tozzi (14 April 1908 – 31 January 1986) was an Italian wrestler. He competed at the 1932 Summer Olympics and the 1936 Summer Olympics.
