= Olaf Knudsen =

Norwegian sport wrestler

Personal information
- Nationality: Norwegian
- Born: 28 March 1911 Halden, Norway
- Died: 17 November 1966 (aged 55)

Sport
- Sport: Wrestling

Olaf Knudsen (28 March 1911 – 17 November 1966) was a Norwegian sport wrestler.

He was born in Halden, and represented the club Halden AK. He competed at the 1936 Summer Olympics, where he placed sixth in Greco-Roman wrestling, the light heavyweight class.
