= Roy Dunn (wrestler) =

American wrestler

Personal information
- Born: August 4, 1910 Knowles, Oklahoma, U.S.
- Died: June 10, 2000 (aged 89) Holly, Colorado, U.S.

Sport
- Country: United States
- Sport: Wrestling
- Events: Freestyle and Folkstyle
- College team: Oklahoma A&M; Northwestern Oklahoma
- Team: USA
- Coached by: Edward C. Gallagher

Roy Dunn (August 4, 1910 – June 10, 2000) was an American wrestler. He competed in the men's freestyle heavyweight at the 1936 Summer Olympics.

Following retirement, he participated in professional wrestling, notably holding the wrestling in the NWA.
