= Alberto Molfino =

Italian wrestler

Personal information
- Nationality: Italian
- Born: 11 July 1906 Genoa, Italy
- Died: 18 July 1977 (aged 71) Terni, Italy

Sport
- Sport: Wrestling

Alberto Molfino (11 July 1906 – 18 July 1977) was an Italian wrestler. He competed in the men's Greco-Roman lightweight at the 1936 Summer Olympics.
