= Edgar Puusepp =

Estonian wrestler (1911–1982)

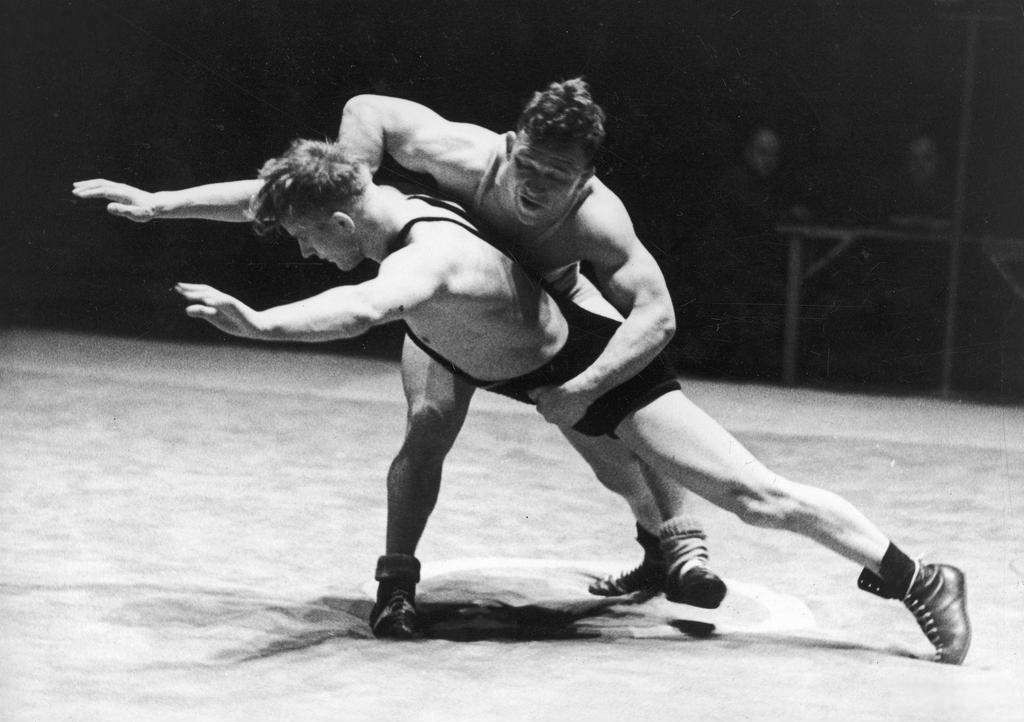
- Edgar Puusepp (top) wrestling Fritz Schäfer in Berlin in 1939

Personal information
- Nationality: Estonian
- Born: 11 September 1911 Tallinn, Estonia
- Died: 19 December 1982 (aged 71) Tallinn, then part of Estonian SSR, Soviet Union

Sport
- Sport: Wrestling

Edgar Puusepp (11 September 1911 – 19 December 1982) was an Estonian wrestler and wrestling coach. He competed in the men's Greco-Roman welterweight at the 1936 Summer Olympics, achieving 4th place. He won a silver medal in Greco-Roman wrestling at the 1939 European Wrestling Championships.

== Career ==
Edgar Puusepp was born in Tallinn to Kaarel and Mai Puusepp (née Luhe). He began training as a wrestler at Kalev Tallinn in 1928 under the guidance of Osvald Käpp. He won a silver medal in the men's welterweight event at the 1939 European Wrestling Championships, and achieved 5th place at both the 1937 and 1938 European Wrestling Championships. He won the gold medal at the 1945 and 1947 USSR Championships, bronze in 1945, and silver in the men's freestyle event in 1947. Puusepp was an 11-time Estonian champion: in 1938, 1940 and 1945-1951 in Greco-Roman wrestling, and 1948 and 1951 in freestyle wrestling.

Prior to the outbreak of World War II, Puusepp worked as a baker in Tallinn. He was mobilized into the Red Army in 1941. After the war, he taught physical education and coached wrestling at Kalev Tallinn. From 1945 until 1959, he was the senior coach of the Estonian Greco-Roman wrestling team and from 1951 until 1957, he was a coach of the USSR team. Later in life, he wrote articles for the sports newspaper Spordileht and the sports and physical fitness magazine Kehakultuur and daily newspapers.

== Personal life and death ==
Edgar Puusepp married Agathe Helene Priidemann. Their son was the cyclist and cycling coach Toomas Puusepp. He died in Tallinn in 1982, aged 71, and is buried in Tallinn's Forest Cemetery.
