= Gyula Vincze =

Hungarian wrestler

Personal information
- Nationality: Hungarian
- Born: 27 January 1914 Budapest, Hungary
- Died: 4 February 2002 (aged 88)

Sport
- Sport: Wrestling

Gyula Vincze (27 January 1914 – 4 February 2002) was a Hungarian wrestler. He competed in the men's Greco-Roman welterweight at the 1936 Summer Olympics.
