= Herbert Olofsson =

Swedish wrestler

Personal information
- Nationality: Swedish
- Born: 8 April 1910 Landskrona, Sweden
- Died: 1 December 1978 (aged 68) Stockholm, Sweden

Sport
- Sport: Wrestling

Herbert Olofsson (8 April 1910 – 1 December 1978) was a Swedish wrestler. He competed in the men's Greco-Roman lightweight at the 1936 Summer Olympics.
