= Franz Foidl =

Austrian wrestler

Personal information
- Nationality: Austrian
- Born: 25 October 1906

Sport
- Sport: Wrestling

Franz Foidl (born 25 October 1906, date of death unknown) was an Austrian wrestler. He competed in the men's Greco-Roman light heavyweight at the 1936 Summer Olympics.
