= Hubert Prokop (wrestler) =

Czech wrestler

Personal information
- Nationality: Czech
- Born: 13 September 1909

Sport
- Sport: Wrestling

Hubert Prokop (born 13 September 1909, date of death unknown) was a Czech wrestler. He competed in the men's freestyle light heavyweight at the 1936 Summer Olympics.
