= Hermann Fischer (athlete) =

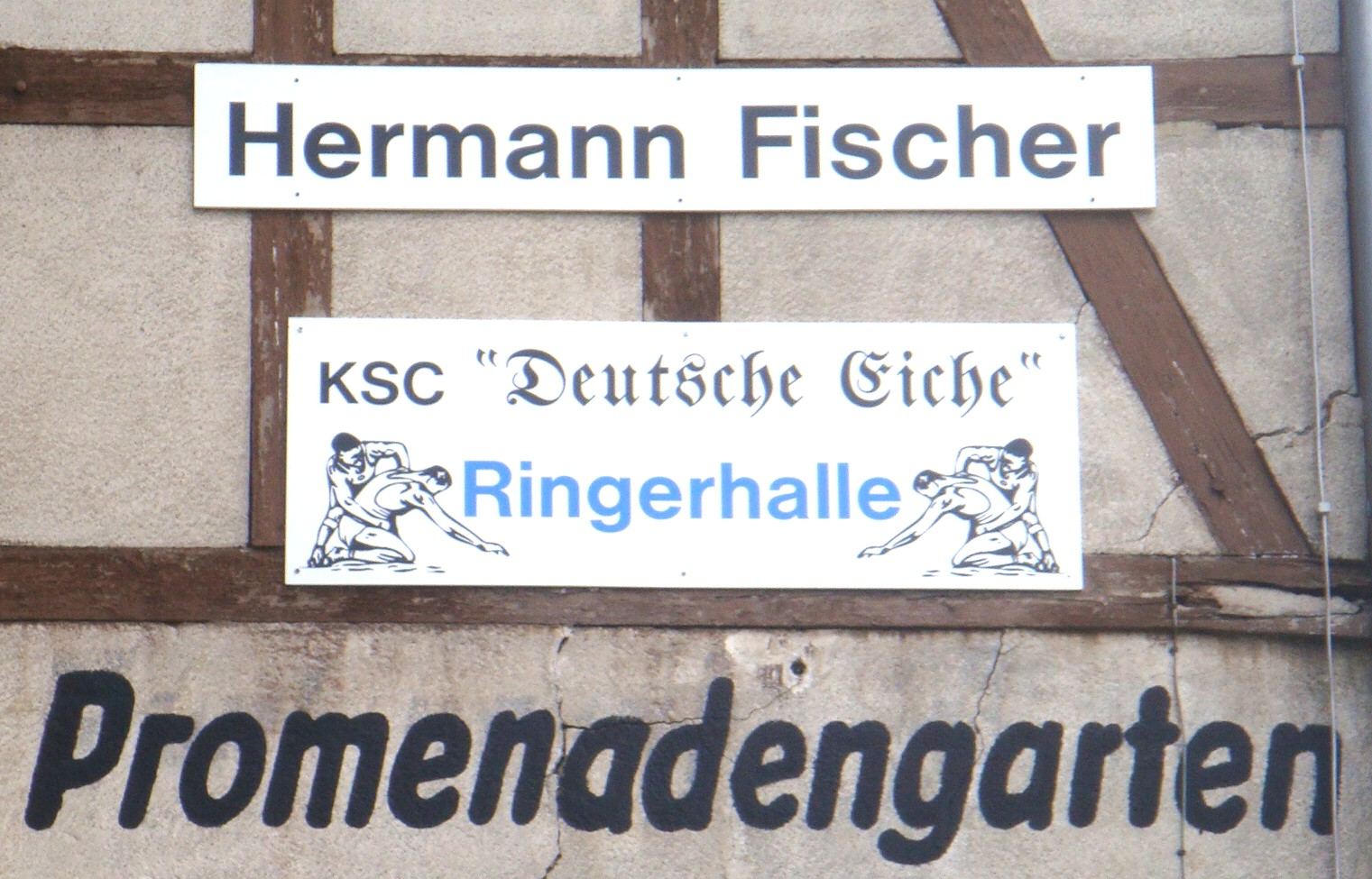
Namensgeber für die Trainingshalle der Apoldaer Ringer

Hermann Fischer (18 January 1912 in Asch, Austria-Hungary (now Aš, Czech Republic) – 23 November 1984 in Merseburg, East Germany) was a German athlete and Communist resistance fighter against Nazism.

== Life ==
His parents, a round knitter and his wife, moved from Asch to Apolda in 1914, where he attended the Volksschule. His early recognizable tendency to woodwork made him take on the profession of a carpenter. Already as a youth, he worked as a wrestler in the Apolda sports clubs "Blau-Gold" and "Olympia". During the period of the Great Depression, he joined the Rote Hilfe, the German branch of the International Red Aid. When the sports associations were banned in 1933, he secretly continued to train. In the same year, he was imprisoned for several weeks because of political resistance. From 1935 onward, he belonged to the regional resistance group Brümmer-Kleine. In 1936 he was condemned to two years in a House of correction with loss of honor. He spent his time in the "Roter Ochse" of Halle. After his dismissal, he continued to work for the Red Aid, and was arrested again in 1941 and was forced into the Buchenwald concentration camp, where he had to work in the quarry, weighing only 40 kg.

After being liberated from the concentration camp, he was recognized as a persecutor of the Nazi regime (VdN). He joined the KPD and organized the Apolda Criminal Police, and then took over the management of a dispossessed room operator. From 1947 to 1953, he belonged to the wrestling national team of the GDR. Since 1951, he worked as a sports and trainer in Berlin, Artern, and Leuna, where he trained young recruits for the GDR national wrestling team. His son Lothar also became a successful wrestler, who won a bronze medal for the GDR in 1958 World Wrestling Championships in Budapest. In 1968, he and Hans Bachmann were appointed as the chief trainers of the team. In 1970, he had to give up his professional activities because of illness, but he continued to volunteer for sports.

== Services ==
- 1949 in Zella-Mehlis 2nd place at the German championship in the Greco-Roman-style as flyweight.

== Honors ==
- Verdienter Meister des Sports
- Ehrennadel des DTSB der DDR in Gold
- Ehrennadel des Ringerverbandes der DDR in Gold
- Medaille „Kämpfer gegen den Faschismus“
- Verleihung seines Namens am 7. Oktober 1986 an die Trainingshalle der Apoldaer Ringer

== Literature ==
- Udo Wohlfeld, Peter Franz: Das Netz. Die Konzentrationslager in Thüringen 1933–1937. Weimar 2000, ISBN 3-935275-02-1.
