= Eduard Schöll =

Austrian wrestler

Personal information
- Nationality: Austrian
- Born: 15 July 1904
- Died: 23 April 1989 (aged 84)

Sport
- Sport: Wrestling

Eduard Schöll (15 July 1904 – 23 April 1989) was an Austrian wrestler. He competed in the men's Greco-Roman heavyweight at the 1936 Summer Olympics.
