= Georg Argast =

Swiss wrestler

Personal information
- Nationality: Swiss
- Born: 2 September 1899

Sport
- Sport: Wrestling

Georg Argast (born 2 September 1899, date of death unknown) was a Swiss wrestler. He competed in the men's Greco-Roman light heavyweight at the 1936 Summer Olympics.
