= Arild Dahl =

Norwegian wrestler

Personal information
- Born: 7 October 1902 Trondheim, Norway
- Died: 28 March 1984 (aged 81) Narvik, Norway

Sport
- Sport: Wrestling
- Club: Narvik Atletklubb
Medal record
Representing Norway
European championships
Bronze medal – third place	1931 Prague	Greco-Roman, 66 kg
Bronze medal – third place	1933 Helsinki	Greco-Roman, 66 kg

Arild Dahl (7 October 1902 – 28 March 1984) was a Norwegian sport wrestler.

He won ten national titles, won two bronze medals in European championships, and represented Norway in two Summer Olympic Games.

== Career ==
Born in Trondheim on 7 October 1902, Dahl represented the club Narvik Atletklubb. He competed at the 1936 Summer Olympics, where he placed sixth in Greco-Roman wrestling, the lightweight class. He also competed at the 1932 Olympics. He won bronze medals at the 1931 and 1933 European Wrestling Championships. He was Norwegian champion ten times, and was awarded the Kongepokal trophy three times, in 1931, 1932 and 1939.

Dahl died in Narvik on 28 March 1984.
