= Erich Siebert =

German wrestler (1910–1947)

Medal record

Men's freestyle wrestling

Representing Germany

Olympic Games
Bronze medal – third place	1936 Berlin	Light heavyweight

Erich Siebert (7 May 1910 – 1947) was a German wrestler who competed in the 1936 Summer Olympics. He died in a prison camp following World War II.
