= Boris Roolaid =

Estonian swimmer

Boris Rosenberg
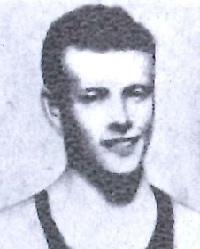

Personal information
- Born: 3 February 1917 Tallinn, Governorate of Estonia, Russian Empire
- Died: 1942 (aged 24–25) Kotlas, Russian SFSR, Soviet Union

Sport
- Sport: Swimming
- Event: 100 m backstroke
- Club: Kalev Tallinn

Achievements and titles
- Personal best: 100 m – 1:20.0 (1936)

Boris Roolaid (born Rosenberg, 3 February 1917 – c. 1942) was an Estonian backstroke swimmer. He competed in the 100 m event at the 1936 Summer Olympics, alongside his younger brother Egon, but failed to reach the final. Roolaid took up swimming in 1932, and between 1935 and 1937 won three national titles. In 1941 both brothers were sent to Soviet labor camps, where they died in 1942–43.
