= Léon Charlier =

Belgian wrestler

Personal information
- Full name: Léon Henri Jules Charlier
- Nationality: Belgian
- Born: 27 October 1902 Waremme, Belgium
- Died: 2 May 1952 (aged 49)

Sport
- Sport: Wrestling

Léon Charlier (27 October 1902 – 2 May 1952) was a Belgian wrestler. He competed at the 1928 Summer Olympics and the 1936 Summer Olympics.
