= Zbigniew Szajewski =

Polish wrestler

Personal information
- Nationality: Polish
- Born: 10 June 1914; Warsaw, Poland
- Died: 13 April 1997 (aged 82); Szczecin, Poland

Sport
- Sport: Wrestling

Zbigniew Szajewski (10 June 1914 – 13 April 1997) was a Polish wrestler. He competed at the 1936 Summer Olympics and the 1952 Summer Olympics.
