= Edvīns Bietags =

Latvian wrestler (1908–1983)

Medal record

Men's Greco-Roman wrestling

Representing Latvia

Olympic Games
Silver medal – second place	1936 Berlin	Light heavyweight

European Championships
Gold medal – first place	1934 Rome	Light heavyweight

Edvīns Bietags (28 February 1908, in Rūjiena – 29 September 1983, in Jūrmala) was a Latvian wrestler and Olympic medalist.

Edvīns competed at the 1936 Summer Olympics in Berlin, Germany, and won a silver medal in Greco-Roman Light Heavyweight wrestling.
