= Wrestling at the 1936 Summer Olympics =

Wrestling at the Games of the XI Olympiad
- Venue: Deutschlandhalle
- Dates: 2 – 9 August 1936
- No. of events: 14 (14 men, 0 women)
- Competitors: 200 from 29 nations

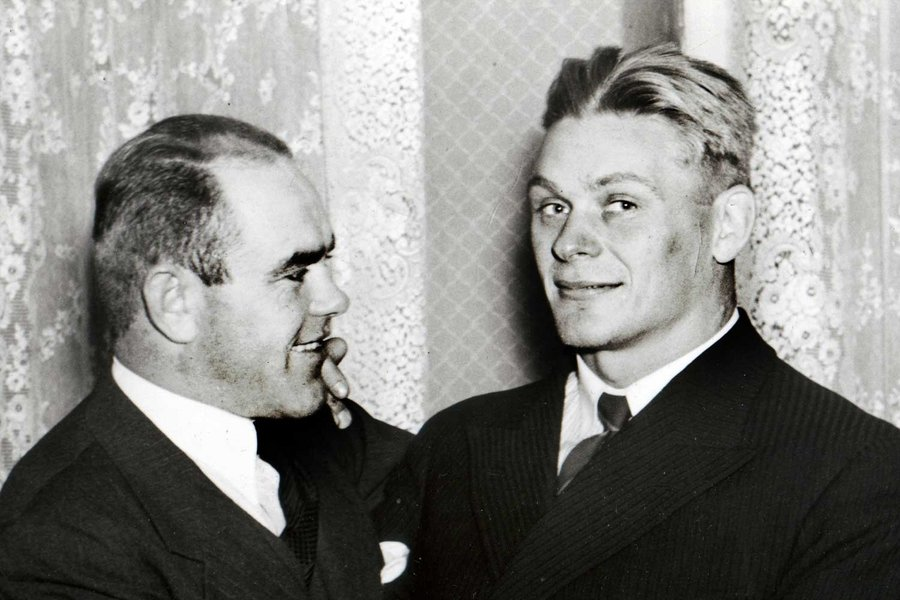
Estonians August Neo (left) and Kristjan Palusalu won medals in both wrestling styles at the 1936 Olympics

At the 1936 Summer Olympics, 14 wrestling events were contested, all for men. There were seven weight classes in Greco-Roman wrestling and seven classes in freestyle wrestling.

== Medal table ==
Rank	Nation	Gold	Silver	Bronze	Total
1	Sweden	4	3	2	9
2	Hungary	3	0	1	4
3	Finland	2	1	3	6
4	Estonia	2	1	2	5
5	United States	1	3	0	4
6	Turkey	1	0	1	2
7	France	1	0	0	1
8	Germany	0	3	4	7
9	Czechoslovakia	0	2	0	2
10	Latvia	0	1	0	1
11	Canada	0	0	1	1
Totals (11 entries)		14	14	14	42

== Medal summary ==
=== Freestyle ===
Games	Gold	Silver	Bronze
Bantamweight	Ödön Zombori; Hungary	Ross Flood; United States	Johannes Herbert; Germany
Featherweight	Kustaa Pihlajamäki; Finland	Francis Millard; United States	Gösta Frändfors; Sweden
Lightweight	Károly Kárpáti; Hungary	Wolfgang Ehrl; Germany	Hermanni Pihlajamäki; Finland
Welterweight	Frank Lewis; United States	Thure Andersson; Sweden	Joe Schleimer; Canada
Middleweight	Emile Poilvé; France	Richard Voliva; United States	Ahmet Kireççi; Turkey
Light Heavyweight	Knut Fridell; Sweden	August Neo; Estonia	Erich Siebert; Germany
Heavyweight	Kristjan Palusalu; Estonia	Josef Klapuch; Czechoslovakia	Hjalmar Nyström; Finland

=== Greco-Roman ===
Games	Gold	Silver	Bronze
Bantamweight	Márton Lõrincz; Hungary	Egon Svensson; Sweden	Jakob Brendel; Germany
Featherweight	Yaşar Erkan; Turkey	Aarne Reini; Finland	Einar Karlsson; Sweden
Lightweight	Lauri Koskela; Finland	Jozef Herda; Czechoslovakia	Voldemar Väli; Estonia
Welterweight	Rudolf Svedberg; Sweden	Fritz Schäfer; Germany	Eino Virtanen; Finland
Middleweight	Ivar Johansson; Sweden	Ludwig Schweickert; Germany	József Palotás; Hungary
Light Heavyweight	Axel Cadier; Sweden	Edvīns Bietags; Latvia	August Neo; Estonia
Heavyweight	Kristjan Palusalu; Estonia	John Nyman; Sweden	Kurt Hornfischer; Germany

== Participating nations ==
A total of 200 wrestlers from 29 nations competed at the Berlin Games:

- Australia (3)
- Austria (7)
- Belgium (11)
- Canada (5)
- Czechoslovakia (13)
- Denmark (5)
- Egypt (3)
- Estonia (8)
- Finland (13)
- France (10)
- Germany (14)
- Great Britain (6)
- Greece (4)
- Hungary (12)
- India (3)
- Italy (10)
- Japan (5)
- Latvia (3)
- Luxembourg (1)
- Norway (3)
- Philippines (1)
- Poland (3)
- Romania (5)
- South Africa (2)
- Sweden (14)
- Switzerland (13)
- Turkey (11)
- United States (7)
- Yugoslavia (5)

== See also ==
- List of World and Olympic Champions in men's freestyle wrestling
- List of World and Olympic Champions in Greco-Roman wrestling
