= Willy Bürki =

Swiss wrestler (1909–1979)

Personal information
- Nationality: Swiss
- Born: 4 July 1909 Bern, Switzerland
- Died: 15 February 1979 (aged 69) Bern, Switzerland

Sport
- Sport: Wrestling

Willy Bürki (4 July 1909 – 15 February 1979) was a Swiss wrestler. He competed in the men's freestyle heavyweight at the 1936 Summer Olympics.
