= Knut Fridell =

Swedish wrestler (1908–1992)

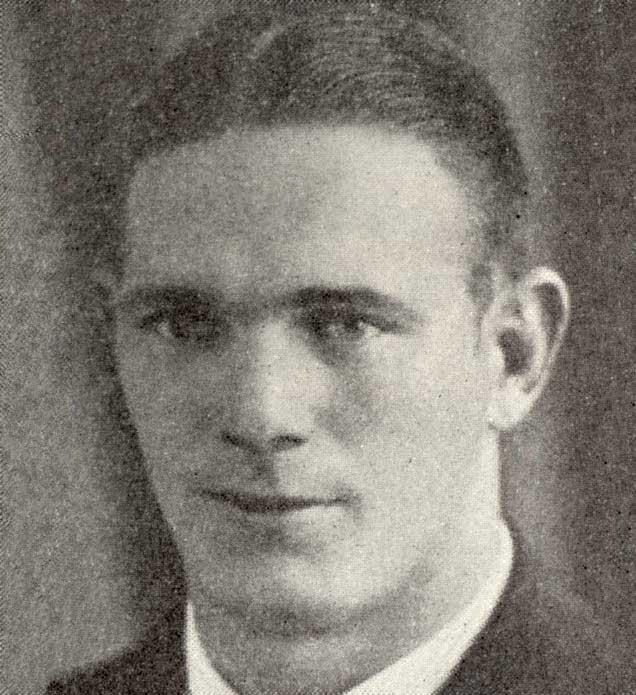

Personal information
- Born: 8 September 1908 Uddevalla, Sweden
- Died: 3 February 1992 (aged 83) Uddevalla, Sweden

Sport
- Sport: Freestyle wrestling
- Club: Uddevalla IS
Medal record
Men's freestyle wrestling
Representing Sweden
Olympic Games
Gold medal – first place	1936 Berlin	87 kg
European Championships
Gold medal – first place	1934 Stockholm	87 kg

Knut Hilding Fridell (8 September 1908 – 3 February 1992) was a Swedish light-heavyweight freestyle wrestler. He won gold medals at the 1934 European Championships and 1936 Summer Olympics.
