= Paul Dätwyler =

Swiss wrestler

Personal information
- Nationality: Swiss
- Born: 16 March 1916
- Died: 25 July 1984 (aged 68)

Sport
- Sport: Wrestling

Paul Dätwyler (13 March 1916 – 25 July 1984) was a Swiss wrestler. He competed at the 1936 Summer Olympics and the 1948 Summer Olympics.
