= Umberto Silvestri =

Italian wrestler

Personal information
- Nationality: Italian
- Born: 6 September 1915; Rome, Italy
- Died: 29 May 2009 (aged 93); Rome, Italy

Sport
- Sport: Wrestling

Umberto Silvestri (6 September 1915 – 29 May 2009) was an Italian wrestler and rugby union international. He competed at the 1936 Summer Olympics, the 1948 Summer Olympics and the 1952 Summer Olympics.

== Filmography ==
| Year | Title | Role | Notes |
|---|---|---|---|
| 1941 | The Iron Crown | Farka | Uncredited |
| 1942 | La pantera nera | | |
| 1943 | Harlem | | |
| 1945 | Tutta la città canta | Leonardo | |
| 1947 | Dove sta Zaza? | | |
| 1949 | Fabíola | | |
| 1950 | La figlia del mendicante | | |
| 1950 | The Lion of Amalfi | | |
| 1951 | Tizio, Caio, Sempronio | Spartaco | |
| 1952 | The Queen of Sheba | Isachar, companion of Rehoboam | |
| 1953 | Sins of Rome | Lentulus | |
| 1954 | Theodora, Slave Empress | L'atleta cieco | |
| 1954 | Ulysses | Polyphemus / Krakos | |
| 1959 | Ben-Hur | Guard on ship | Uncredited |
| 1962 | Gladiator of Rome | Gladiator Trainer | Uncredited |
| 1962 | Colossus of the Arena | Brutus | |
| 1963 | I Am Semiramis | Wrestler | |
| 1970 | The Conformist | Hired Killer | (final film role) |
