= Egon Roolaid =

Estonian swimmer

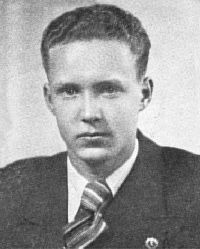

Personal information
- Born: Egon Rosenberg; 26 September 1918 Tallinn, Estonia
- Died: 1943 (aged 24–25) Chelyabinsk Oblast, Russia
- Height: 177 cm (5 ft 10 in)
- Weight: 75 kg (165 lb)

Sport
- Sport: Swimming
- Event: 100–400 m freestyle
- Club: Kalev Tallinn

Achievements and titles
- Personal best(s): 100 m 1:01.1 (1939); 200 m – 2:21.4 (1939); 400 m – 5:06.8 (1938)

Egon Roolaid (born Rosenberg, 26 September 1918 – c. 1943) was an Estonian freestyle swimmer. He competed in the 100 m event at the 1936 Summer Olympics, alongside his brother Boris, but failed to reach the final.

Roolaid took up swimming in 1932, and between 1934 and 1940 won 19 national titles. In 1941 both brothers were sent to Soviet labor camps, where they died in 1942–43. Egon was rehabilitated in 1989.
