= John Nyman =

Swedish wrestler (1908–1977)

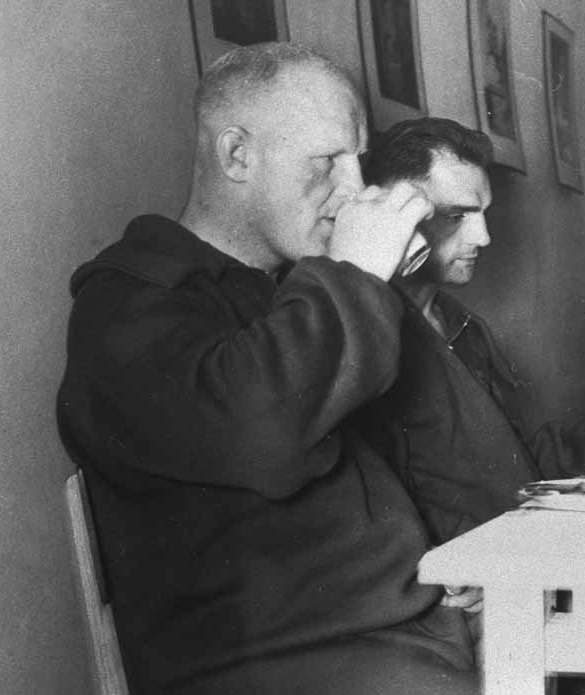
- Nyman at the 1936 Olympics

Personal information
- Born: 25 April 1908 Sundsvall, Sweden
- Died: 19 October 1977 (aged 69) Sundsvall, Sweden

Sport
- Sport: Greco-Roman wrestling
- Club: SAIK, Sundsvall
Medal record
Men's Greco-Roman wrestling
Representing Sweden
Olympic Games
Silver medal – second place	1936 Berlin	+87 kg
European Championships
Silver medal – second place	1937 Paris	+87 kg
Silver medal – second place	1938 Tallinn	+87 kg
Silver medal – second place	1939 Oslo	+87 kg

John Emanuel Nyman (25 April 1908 – 19 October 1977) was a Swedish heavyweight Greco-Roman wrestler.

He was the national champion in 1935–42 and won silver medals at the 1936 Summer Olympics, again in 1937 and at the 1938 European championships.

In retirement, he worked as a wrestling coach and physical education teacher at his club SAIK.
