= Lauri Koskela =

Finnish wrestler (1907–1944)

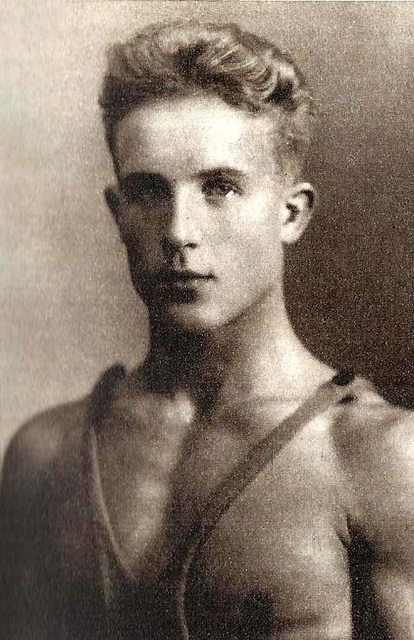

Personal information
- Born: 16 May 1907 Lapua, Finland
- Died: 3 August 1944 (aged 37) Baryshevo, Leningrad, Russia
- Height: 167 cm (5 ft 6 in)
- Weight: 62–68 kg (137–150 lb)

Sport
- Sport: Greco-Roman wrestling
- Club: Lapuan Virkiä
Medal record
Men's Greco-Roman wrestling
Representing Finland
Olympic Games
Gold medal – first place	1936 Berlin	66 kg
Bronze medal – third place	1932 Los Angeles	61 kg
European championships
Gold medal – first place	1935 Copenhagen	66 kg
Gold medal – first place	1937 Paris	66 kg
Gold medal – first place	1938 Tallinn	66 kg
Bronze medal – third place	1939 Oslo	66 kg

Lauri Koskela (16 May 1907 – 3 August 1944) was a Greco-Roman wrestler from Finland. He competed at the 1932 and 1936 Olympics and won a bronze and a gold medal, respectively. Koskela was the European champion in 1935, 1937 and 1938 and placed third in 1939. Domestically, he won seven titles in 1932–33, 1936 and 1940–43.

== Kidnapping and death ==
Koskela lived in Lapua, South Ostrobothnia, where he worked at the State Cartridge Factory. Koskela was a member of the local trade union branch and the Communist Party of Finland. In 1930, he was kidnapped by the fascist Lapua Movement. Koskela represented the left-wing club Ponnistus until the fall of 1930, when he joined the right-wing Virkiä in order to make it to the Olympics, as the Finnish Workers' Sports Federation did not participate in the games. Koskela was killed in action during the Continuation War in 1944.

== See also ==
- List of kidnappings
- List of solved missing person cases (pre-1950)
