= Kurt Hornfischer =

German wrestler (1910–1958)

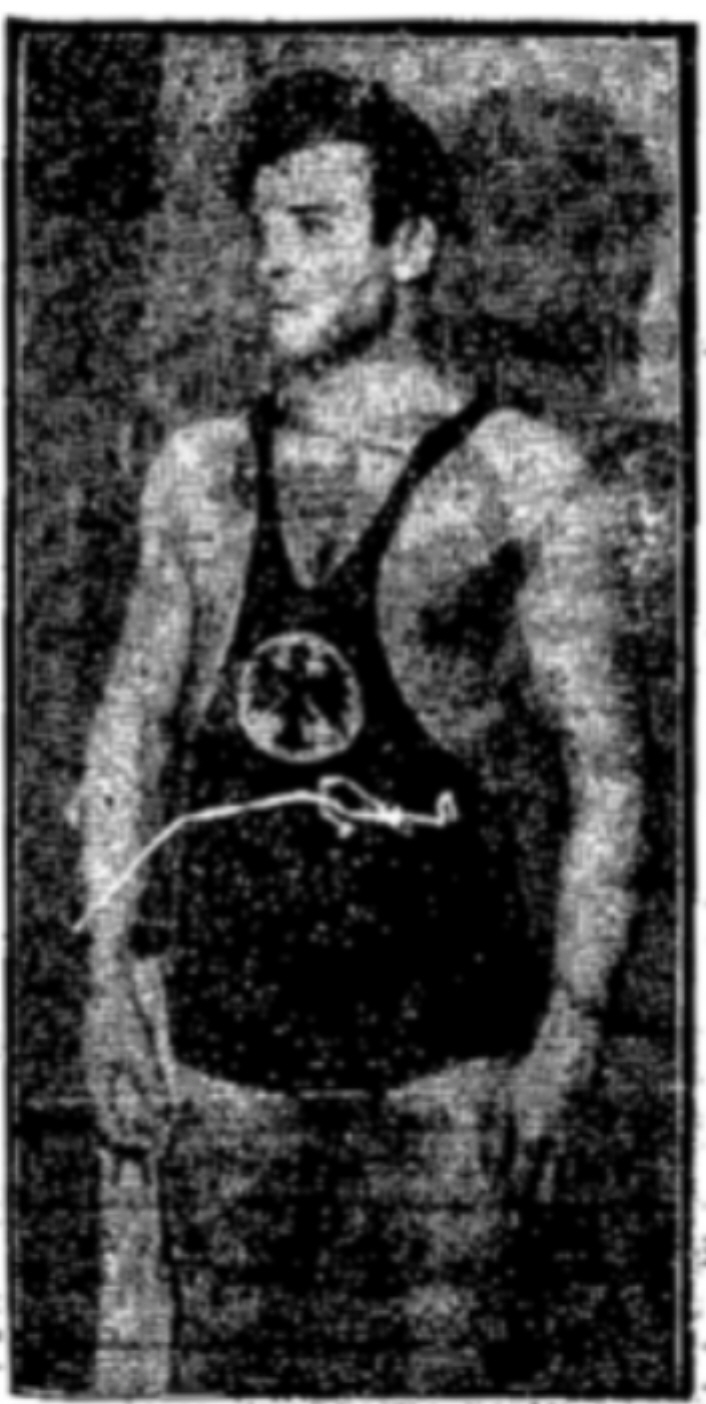

Medal record

Men's Greco-Roman wrestling

Representing Germany

Olympic Games
Bronze medal – third place	1936 Berlin	Heavyweight

Kurt Hornfischer (1 February 1910 in Gera – 18 January 1958 in Nuremberg) was a German wrestler who competed in the 1936 Summer Olympics.
