= Rudolf Svedberg =

Swedish wrestler (1910–1992)

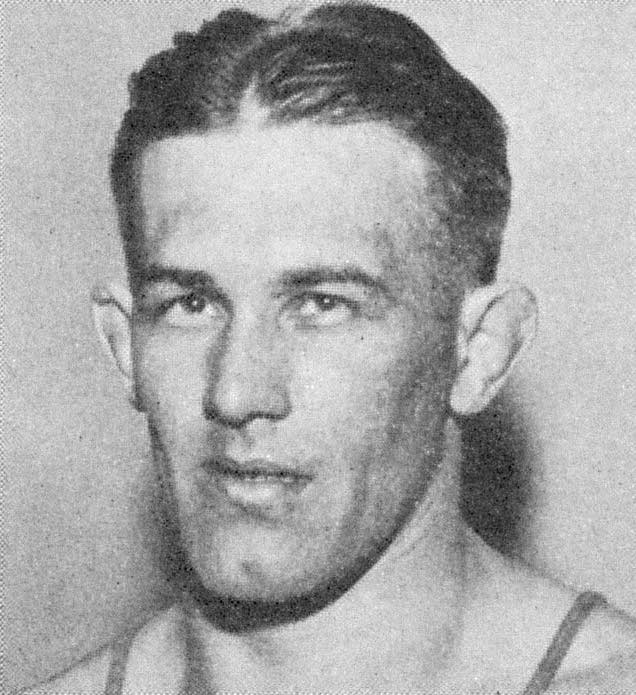

Personal information
- Born: 19 August 1910 Njurunda, Sweden
- Died: 24 June 1992 (aged 81) Eskilstuna, Sweden

Sport
- Sport: Greco-Roman wrestling
- Club: Sundsvalls AIK
Medal record
Men's Greco-Roman wrestling
Representing Sweden
Olympic Games
| Gold medal – first place | 1936 Berlin | 75 kg |
European Championships
| Gold medal – first place | 1935 Copenhagen | 75 kg |
| Silver medal – second place | 1938 Tallinn | 75 kg |
- Updated on 18 April 2024

Per Vilhelm Rudolf "Preven" Svedberg (19 August 1910 – 24 June 1992) was a welterweight Greco-Roman wrestler from Sweden. He won gold medals at the 1936 Summer Olympics and 1935 European Championships, finishing second in 1938. Between 1934 and 1944 he won ten national titles.

After retiring from competitions Svedberg worked with the national team, first as an assistant coach, in 1945–56 under Robert Oksa, and then as the head coach from 1956 to 1972.
