= Josef Klapuch =

Czechoslovak wrestler

Medal record

Men's freestyle wrestling

Representing Czechoslovakia

Olympic Games
Silver medal – second place	1936 Berlin	Heavyweight

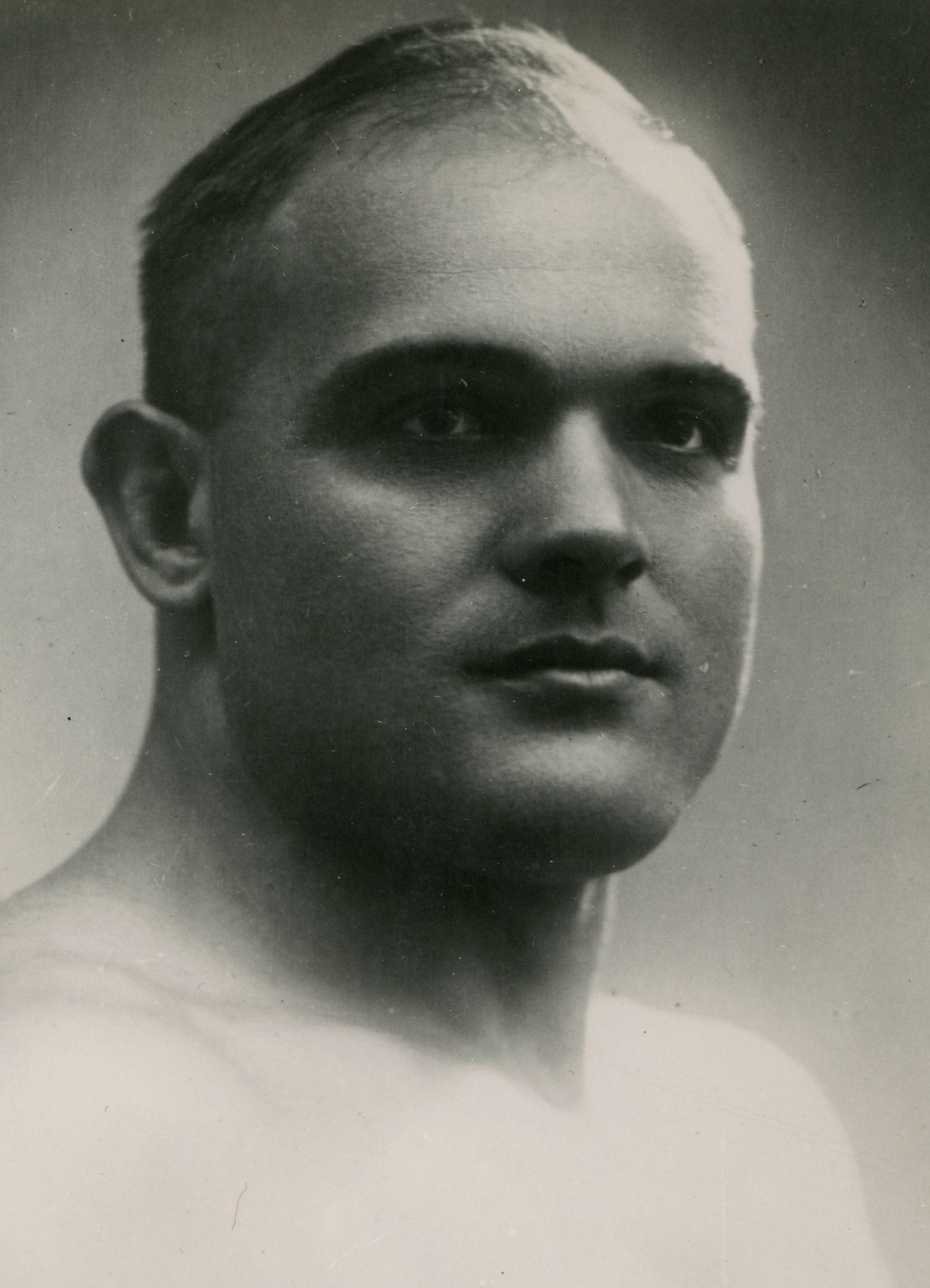
Klapuch in 1937

Josef Klapuch (10 February 1906 – 18 December 1985) was a Czechoslovak wrestler. He was born in Zbyslavice in February 1906. He won an Olympic silver medal in Freestyle wrestling in 1936. Klapuch died on 18 December 1985, at the age of 79.
