= Mustafa Avcioğlu-Çakmak =

Turkish wrestler

Personal information
- Nationality: Turkish
- Born: 19 December 1909; Sivas, Turkey
- Died: 30 November 2009 (aged 99); Istanbul, Turkey

Sport
- Sport: Wrestling

Mustafa Avcioğlu-Çakmak (19 December 1909 – 30 November 2009) was a Turkish wrestler. He competed at the 1936 Summer Olympics and the 1948 Summer Olympics.
