= Axel Cadier =

Swedish wrestler (1906–1974)

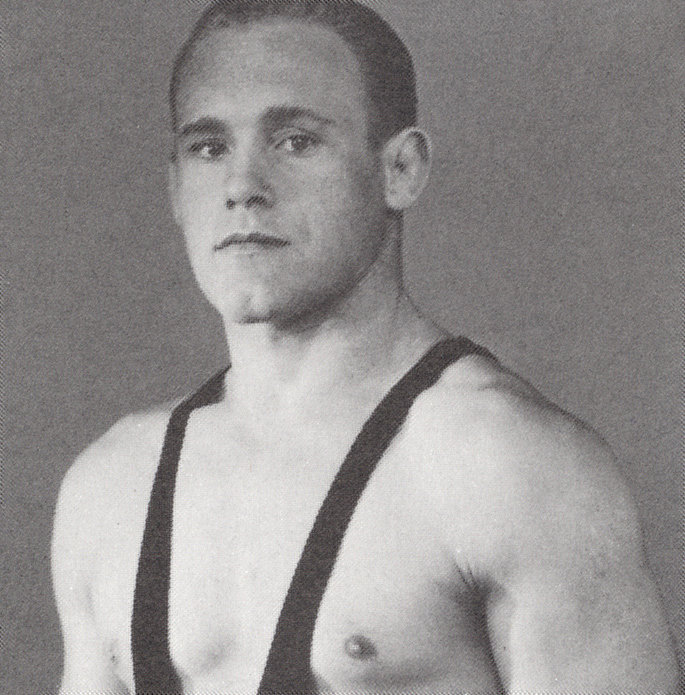

Personal information
- Born: 13 September 1906 Varberg, Sweden
- Died: 29 October 1974 (aged 68) Gothenburg, Sweden

Sport
- Sport: Wrestling
- Club: Borås AK
Medal record
Representing Sweden
Olympic Games
Gold medal – first place	1936 Berlin	Greco-Roman 87 kg
Bronze medal – third place	1932 Los Angeles	Greco-Roman 79 kg
World Championships
Gold medal – first place	1933 Helsinki	Greco-Roman 79 kg
Gold medal – first place	1935 Copenhagen	Greco-Roman 87 kg
Gold medal – first place	1937 Munich	Freestyle 87 kg
Gold medal – first place	1938 Tallinn	Greco-Roman 87 kg
Silver medal – second place	1935 Brussels	Freestyle 87 kg

Axel Vilhelm Teodor Cadier (13 September 1906 – 29 October 1974) was a Swedish wrestler. He competed in Greco-Roman events at the 1932 and 1936 Summer Olympics and won a bronze and a gold medal, respectively.

Cadier first trained in swimming and boxing, but changed to wrestling at the age 21. Besides his Olympic medals he won four European and 11 national titles in Greco-Roman and freestyle wrestling (1934–1942; 6 in Greco-Roman, 5 in freestyle). In the 1940s–1950s he wrestled professionally in North America. After that he trained the Norwegian national team and worked as an instructor at the French State Sports Institute.
