= August Neo =

Estonian wrestler (1908–1982)

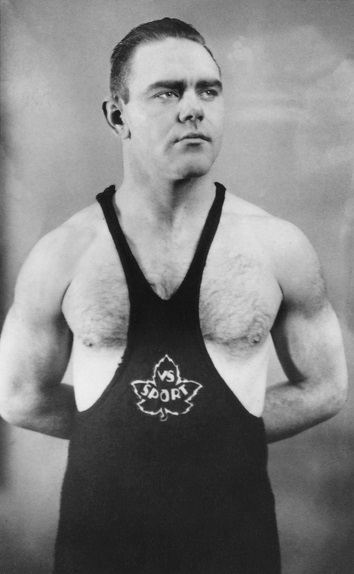
- August Neo c. 1936

Personal information
- Born: 12 February 1908 Vihterpalu, Governorate of Estonia, Russian Empire
- Died: 19 August 1982 (aged 74) Århus, Denmark

Sport
- Sport: Wrestling
- Club: Sport Tallinn
Medal record
Representing Estonia
Olympic Games
| Silver medal – second place | 1936 Berlin | Freestyle 87 kg |
| Bronze medal – third place | 1936 Berlin | Greco-Roman 87 kg |
European Championships
| Silver medal – second place | 1934 Rome | Greco-Roman 79 kg |
| Bronze medal – third place | 1935 Copenhagen | Greco-Roman 87 kg |
| Bronze medal – third place | 1935 Brussels | Freestyle 87 kg |
| Silver medal – second place | 1937 Paris | Greco-Roman 87 kg |
| Bronze medal – third place | 1939 Oslo | Greco-Roman 87 kg |

August "Ago" Neo (12 February 1908 – 19 August 1982) was an Estonian wrestler who won two medals at the 1936 Summer Olympics: a silver medal in the freestyle wrestling and a bronze in Greco-Roman wrestling. His achievements were underscored by teammate Kristjan Palusalu, who won two gold medals in wrestling at the same games. Neo also won five medals in both wrestling styles at the European championships in 1934–1939.

Neo took up wrestling in 1928 and in 1931 placed fourth at European championships. He missed the 1932 Olympics because Estonia did not send an ample team to Los Angeles due to the Great Depression. During World War II he retired from wrestling and emigrated to Sweden. There he founded a small transport company and worked as a truck driver. He died in 1982 in Denmark, on the way from Germany to Sweden. Neo was first buried at Stockholm, but in 1998 reburied at the Metsakalmistu cemetery in Tallinn, Estonia.
