= Jozef Herda =

Czechoslovak wrestler (1910–1985)

Medal record

Men's Greco-Roman wrestling

Representing Czechoslovakia

Olympic Games
Silver medal – second place	1936 Berlin	Lightweight

Jozef Herda (21 April 1910 – 4 October 1985) was a Czechoslovak wrestler. He was born in Trnava. He won an Olympic silver medal in Greco-Roman wrestling in 1936.
