= Kristjan Palusalu =

Estonian wrestler (1908–1987)

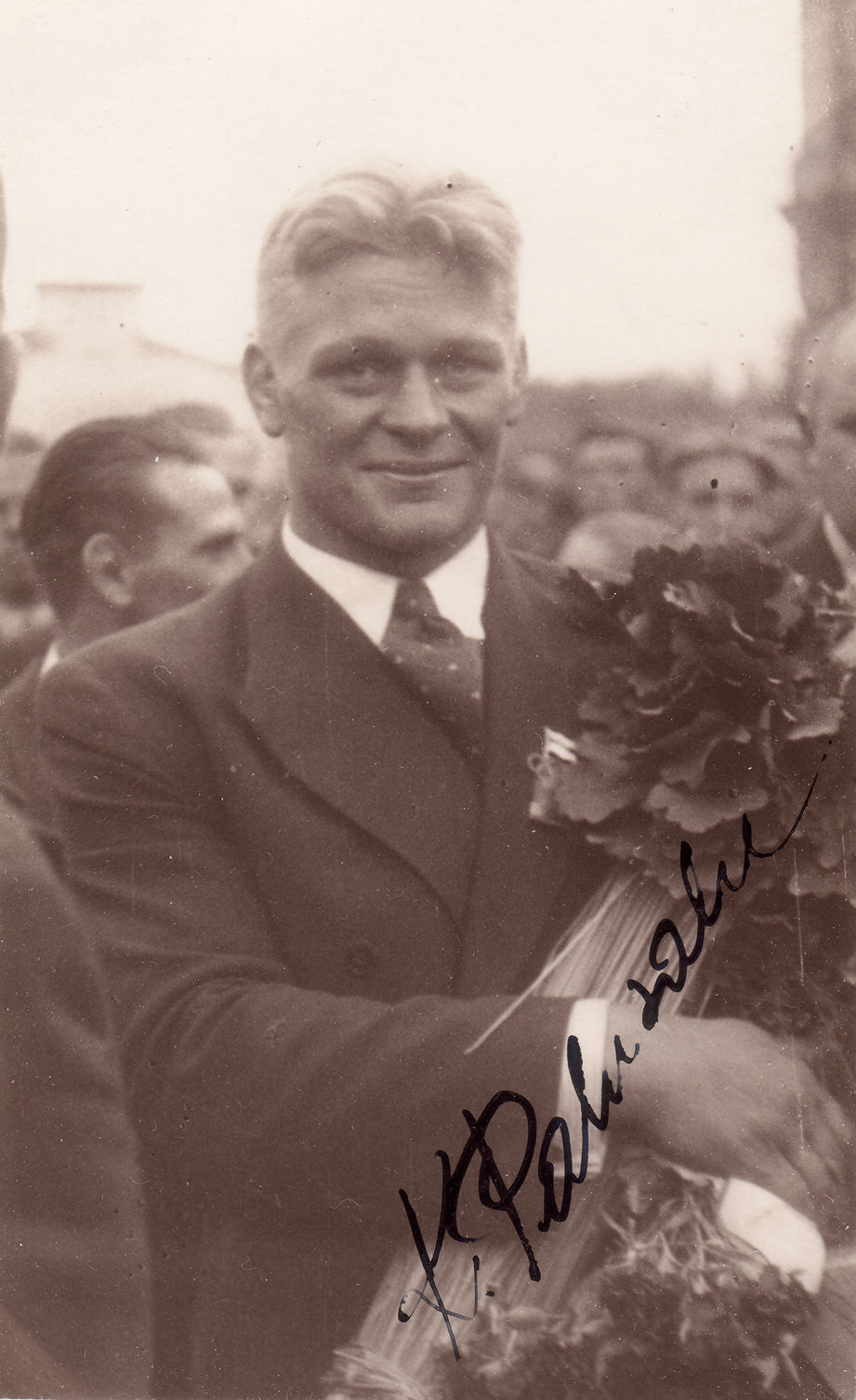

Personal information
- Born: 10 March 1908 Varemurru (now Matsi, Pärnu County), Estonia (then Russian Empire)
- Died: 17 July 1987 (aged 79) Tallinn, then part of Estonian SSR, Soviet Union
- Height: 1.85 m (6 ft 1 in)
- Weight: 110 kg (243 lb)

Sport
- Sport: Wrestling
- Events: Greco-Roman; Freestyle
- Club: Sport Tallinn
- Coached by: Anton Ohaka
Medal record

Men's Greco-Roman wrestling
Representing Estonia
Olympic Games
Gold medal – first place	1936 Berlin	Heavyweight
European Championships
Gold medal – first place	1937 Paris	Heavyweight
Men's freestyle wrestling
Representing Estonia
Olympic Games
Gold medal – first place	1936 Berlin	Heavyweight

Kristjan Palusalu (until 1935 Kristjan Trossmann, 10 March [O.S. 26 February] 1908 – 17 July 1987) was an Estonian heavyweight wrestler and Olympic winner. Palusalu became the first and only wrestler in Olympic history ever to win both the Greco-Roman and freestyle heavyweight events.

Palusalu was born in Varemurru village, Saulepi Parish, Lääne County (now Matsi village, Lääneranna Parish, Pärnu County) as one of eight children to Jüri and Liisu Trossmann. He is best remembered for winning two gold medals at the 1936 Summer Olympics in Berlin. He was given the honor of carrying the Estonian flag to the Olympiastadion. The triumph was celebrated across Estonia with Palusalu and other Estonian athletes touring the country by rail giving speeches. A third of the inhabitants of Tallinn turned out to greet him and the Estonian government granted him a farm.

After the Soviet Union occupied Estonia in 1940, Palusalu was sent to hard labour in Kotlas, Russia in 1941. He tried to escape with other prisoners but was captured after a few days. He was then sentenced to death together with his fellow fugitives but was given the chance to go to the front line to fight against Finland in the Continuation War. He deserted to the Finnish side in Northern Karelia, northwest of Lake Onega. According to one Finnish soldier, Mr. Suuperko, Palusalu and his friends shouted "Finnish boys do not shoot Estonians", when they crossed the lines. Palusalu was soon recognized by a person in the Finnish army, who had sports background (Heikki Savolainen).

He was imprisoned, but then was allowed to return to his homeland, which was then under German occupation. After the return of the Soviet army in 1945 he was arrested again, but was later allowed to work as a trainer and a referee, he also participated in some competitions in Estonia. He was not forgotten by the Estonian people. As one of the most popular sportsmen in Estonia throughout history, Kristjan Palusalu is one of the few who have become synonymous with the Estonian nation itself.

Palusalu was married to Ellen Saidla. The couple had a son, Jüri Palusalu.

== Legacy ==
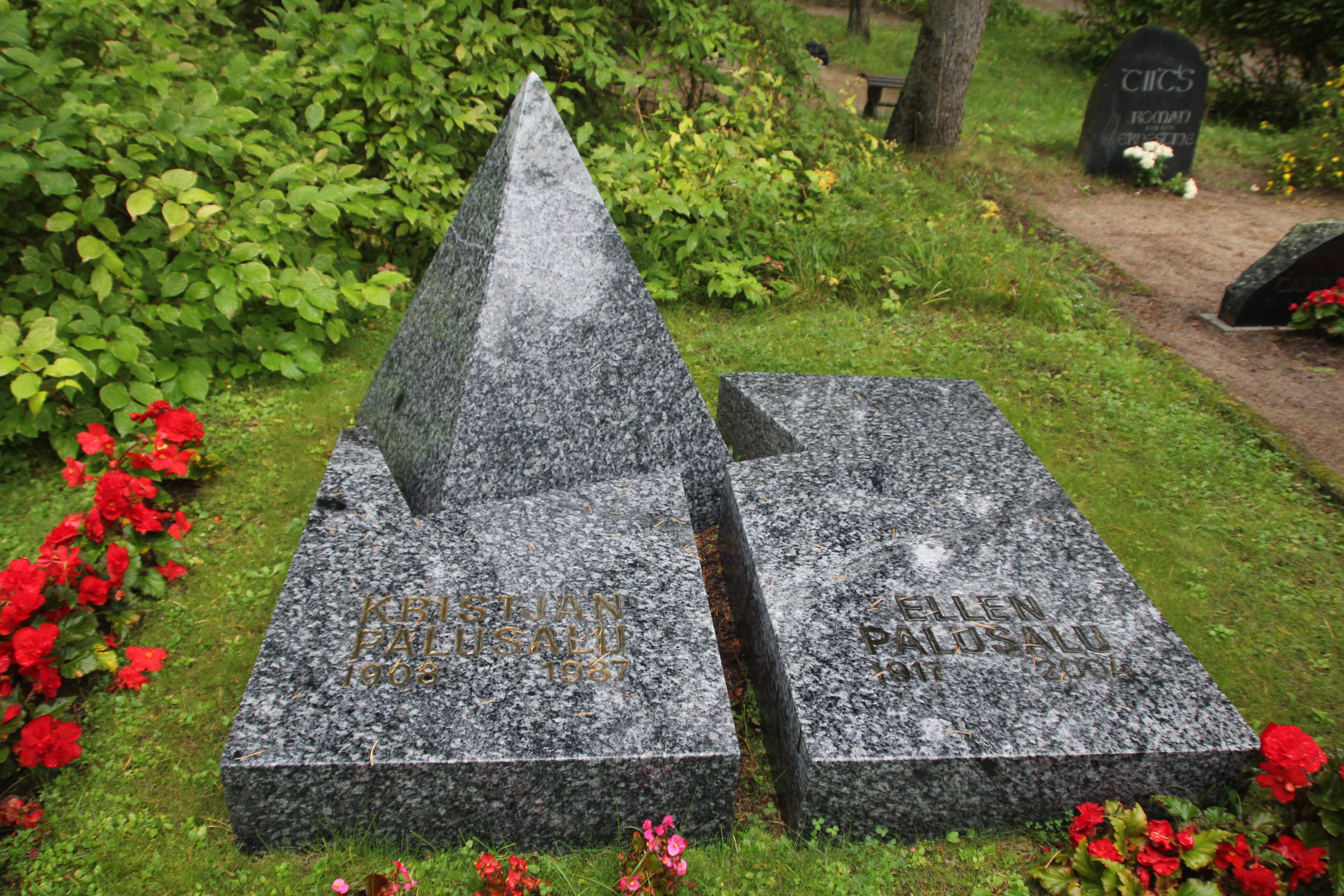
Kristjan and Ellen Palusalu's graves at Tallinn's Forest Cemetery

.

The international Kristjan Palusalu Memorial in Greco-Roman wrestling is held in Estonia from 1988.
