= Fritz Schäfer =

German wrestler (1912–1973)

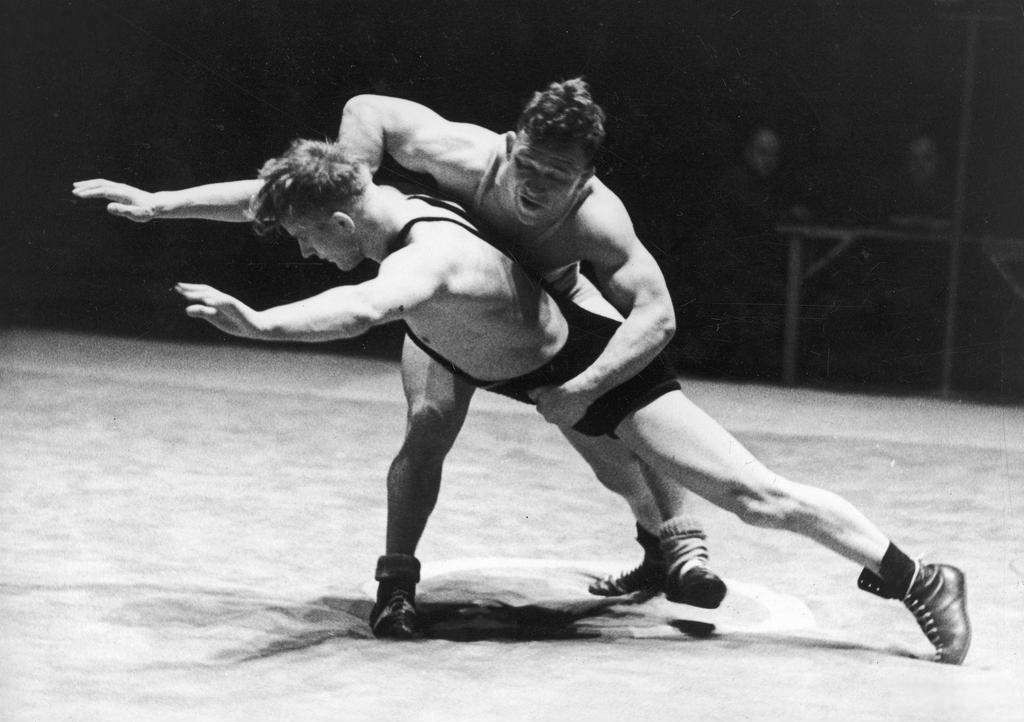
- Schäfer (bottom) wrestling Edgar Puusepp in Berlin in 1939

Medal record

Men's Greco-Roman wrestling

Representing Germany

Olympic Games
Silver medal – second place	1936 Berlin	Welterweight

Fritz Schäfer (7 September 1912 in Pirmasens – 15 October 1973 in Ludwigshafen am Rhein) was a German wrestler who competed in the 1936 Summer Olympics.
