= Latvia at the 1936 Summer Olympics =

- IOC code: LAT
- NOC: Latvian Olympic Committee

in Berlin
- Competitors: 24 (Note: Art competitions were held as part of the 1928 Summer Olympics, and Latvia had five participants in these competitions. However, the International Olympic Committee later classified these art competitions as unofficial Olympic events, and these do not appear in the IOC database. The medals were not counted towards the final medal tally.) in 5 sports
- Flag bearer: Haralds Marvē
- Medals Ranked 24th: Gold 0 Silver 1 Bronze 1 Total 2

Summer Olympics appearances (overview)
- 1924; 1928; 1932; 1936; 1948–1988; 1992; 1996; 2000; 2004; 2008; 2012; 2016; 2020; 2024

Other related appearances
- Russian Empire (1908–1912); Soviet Union (1952–1988)

Latvia participated at the 1936 Summer Olympics in Berlin, Germany held between 1 and 16 August 1936. The country's participation in the Games marked its fourth appearance at the Summer Olympics since its debut in the 1924 Games.

The Latvian team consisted of 24 athletes who competed across five sports. Haralds Marvē served as the country's flag-bearer during the opening ceremony. Latvia won two medals including a silver and a bronze, and was ranked 24th in the medal table.

== Background ==
The 1924 Summer Olympics marked Latvia's first participation in the Olympic Games. After the nation made its debut in the Summer Olympics at the 1924 Games, this edition of the Games in 1936 marked the nation's fourth appearance at the Summer Games.

The 1936 Summer Olympics was held in Berlin between 1 and 16 August 1936. The Latvian team consisted of 24 athletes who competed across five sports. Haralds Marvē served as the country's flag-bearer during the opening ceremony.

== Medalists ==
Latvia won two medals including a silver and a bronze. It was the country's first ever multiple medal haul. The nation had previously won a lone silver medal at the 1932 Summer Olympics. Latvia was ranked 24th in the medal table.

Medal	Name	Sport	Event
Silver	Edvīns Bietags	Wrestling	Men's Greco-Roman -87 kg
Bronze	Adalberts Bubenko	Athletics	Men's 50 km Walk

== Competitors ==
Latvia sent 15 athletes who competed in five sports at the Games.

Sport	Men	Women	Athletes
Athletics	7	0	7
Basketball	7	0	7
Cycling	4	0	4
Shooting	3	0	3
Wrestling	3	0	3
Total	24	0	24

== Athletics ==
Athletics competitions were held between 2 and 9 August 1936 at the Olympiastadion, Reichssportfeld, Berlin. Latvia had six participants in the Games.

Adalberts Bubenko participated in the men's 50 km racewalk event, which was conducted for the first time in Summer Olympics. This was the first and only Olympic participation for Bubenko. He won a bronze medal after completing the course in over four hours and 32 minutes. In the Marathon event, Artūrs Motmillers was classified in 28th place. Voldemārs Vītols finished in seventh place in the 3000 m steeplechase event. In the field events, Oto Jurģis was ranked 13th in the Javelin throw event. None of the other athletes advanced to the final in their respective competitions.

Track & road events

Athlete	Event	Heat		Final	
Athlete	Event	Result	Rank	Result	Rank
Adalberts Bubenko	Men's 50 km walk	—N/a		4:32:42.2	3rd place, bronze medalist(s)
Jānis Daliņš	Men's 50 km walk	—N/a		DNF	
Arnolds Krūkliņš	Men's 50 km walk	—N/a		DNF	
Artūrs Motmillers	Men's marathon	—N/a		2:58:02.0	28
Voldemārs Vītols	3000 m steeplechase	9:28.8	3 Q	9:18.8	7

Field events

Athlete	Event	Heat		Final	
Athlete	Event	Result	Rank	Result	Rank
Oto Jurģis	Men's javelin throw	61.9	11 q	60.71	13

Combined events

Athlete	Event	Competition	100	LJ	SP	HJ	400 m	100H	JT	PV	JT	1500 m	Final	Rank
Jānis Dimza	Men's decathlon	Result	11.9	6.36	13.66	1.70	DNS						DNF	
Jānis Dimza	Men's decathlon	Points	624	666	708	544	DNF						DNF	

== Basketball ==
Basketball competitions were held at Tennisplätze, Berlin. This was the official debut for the sport at the Olympics. Latvia won the first round against Uruguay by a score of 20–17. It lost the second round match to Canada. Winners advanced to the third round. Losers competed in the second consolation round for another chance to move on. In the repechage rounds, the team lost to Poland to crash out of the competition.

7 August 1936	Uruguay	17–20	Latvia	Berlin, Germany

9 August 1936	Canada	34–23	Latvia	Berlin, Germany

10 August 1936	Poland	28–23	Latvia	Berlin, Germany

== Cycling ==
Cycling competitions were held at the Avus-Nordschleife in Berlin. Four cyclists, all men, represented Latvia in two events at the Games. In both the events, Latvia did not win a medal.

Road

Athlete	Event	Time	Rank
Aleksejs Jurjevs	Men's road race	2:52:08.0	AC
Arvīds Immermanis	Men's road race	2:52:08.0	AC
Jānis Vītols	Men's road race	2:52:08.0	AC
Mārtiņš Mazūrs	Men's road race	2:37:08.0	AC
Mārtiņš Mazūrs; Arvīds Immermanis; Aleksejs Jurjevs; Jānis Vītols	Team time trial	8:21:24.0 ET	AC

== Shooting ==
Shooting competitions were held at the Schießstände in Berlin. Three shooters, all men, represented Latvia in two events at the Games. In both the events, Latvia did not win a medal.

Athlete	Event	Round 1	Round 2	Round 3	Round 4	Shoot off	Final	
Athlete	Event	Score	Score	Score	Score	Score	Score	Rank
Rūdolfs Baumanis	Men's 50 metre rifle prone	—N/a					291	32
Kārlis Kļava	Men's 25 m rapid fire pistol	18	4	Did not advance			22	23
Haralds Marvē	Men's 25 m rapid fire pistol	18	6	5	3	-	29	8

== Wrestling ==
Wrestling competitions were held at Krachtsportgebouw in Amsterdam. Latvia had three participants in the event. Alberts Zvejnieks did not make it out of the elimination rounds in the heavyweight category. In the featherweight category, Krisjānis Kundziņš won two out of his four bouts to be ranked fifth in the final classification. In the light heavyweight category, Edvīns Bietags won a silver medal after losing to Axel Cadier in the finals. This was Latvia's second ever silver medal at the Olympics, and the first ever wrestling medal.

Greco-Roman

Athlete	Event	Elimination Pool							Final round	
Athlete	Event	Round 1	Round 2	Round 3	Round 4	Round 5	Round 6	Rank	Final	Rank
Krisjānis Kundziņš	Men's −66 kg	August Scherpenisse (BEL); W F 8.10	Valentino Borgia (ITA); L 0–3	Nikolaos Biris (GRE); W F 14:11	—N/a	Yaşar Erkan (TUR); L 0–3	—N/a	5	Did not advance	
Edvīns Bietags	Men's −87 kg	Werner Seelenbinder (GER); L F 10.00	Gyula Bóbis (HUN); W F 3.46	Mustafa Avcioglu (TUR); W F 11.36	—N/a	August Neo (EST); W 2–1	—N/a	2	Axel Cadier (SWE); L 0–3	2nd place, silver medalist(s)
Alberts Zvejnieks	Men's +87 kg	Josef Klapuch (TCH); L F 3.05	Stevan Nagy (YUG); W F 15.44	Kurt Hornfischer (GER); L 0–3	Did not advance			AC	Did not advance	

== Art competitions ==
The art competitions consisted a competition between various art entries to be sent by the National Olympic Committees across the specified categories except the music competition. Physical exhibits were displayed at the Kaiserdamm. Latvia had five competitors in the art competitions.

Art competitions were awarded medals as part of the Games. However, the International Olympic Committee later classified these art competitions as unofficial Olympic events, and these do not appear in the IOC database. The medals were not counted towards the final medal tally.

Athlete	Event	Title	Rank
Wilfried Strik-Strikfeldt	Literature	Olympische Briefe	Not Awarded
Augusts Annuss	Painting	Struggle and Goal	Not Awarded
Konstantīns Visotskis	Painting	Weg ist er!	Not Awarded
Rūdolfs Mazūrs	Painting	Vier Aquarelle	Not Awarded
Voldemārs Vimba	Painting	Finish!	Not Awarded
