= Chile at the 1936 Summer Olympics =

- IOC code: CHI
- NOC: Chilean Olympic Committee

in Berlin
- Competitors: 40 in 8 sports
- Flag bearer: Rafael Zúñiga
- Medals: Gold 0 Silver 0 Bronze 0 Total 0

Summer Olympics appearances (overview)
- ~~1896~~; 1900–1908; 1912; 1920; 1924; 1928; 1932; 1936; 1948; 1952; 1956; 1960; 1964; 1968; 1972; 1976; 1980; 1984; 1988; 1992; 1996; 2000; 2004; 2008; 2012; 2016; 2020; 2024; 2028

Chile at the 1936 Summer Olympics in Berlin, Germany was the nation's seventh appearance out of ten editions of the Summer Olympic Games. This was the first time that the nation was represented by a team under the auspices of the Chilean Olympic Committee of 39 males and 1 female athletes that competed in 27 events in 8 sports. The previous six teams that represented the nation were either walk-ons to the competitions or under the auspices of the Chilean Athletics Federation (FEDACHI) founded in 1914.

== Athletics ==
Men
Track events

Athlete	Event	Heat		Quarterfinal		Semifinal		Final	
Athlete	Event	Time	Rank	Time	Rank	Time	Rank	Time	Rank
Raúl Muñoz	400 m	50.5	5	did not advance					
Miguel Castro	1500 metres	?:??.?	10	—N/a				did not advance	
Walter Fritsch	400 m hurdles	58.3	6	—N/a		did not advance			

Road events

Athlete	Event	Final	
Athlete	Event	Time	Rank
Juan Acosta	Marathon	DNF	—

Field events

Athlete	Event	Qualification		Semifinal		Final	
Athlete	Event	Distance	Position	Distance	Position	Distance	Position
Juan Reccius	Triple jump	<14.0	DNQ	did not advance			
Adolfo Schlegel	Pole vault	>3.80	Q	3.60	24	did not advance	
Anton Barticevic	Hammer throw	>46.0	Q	45.23	17	did not advance	

Combined events – Decathlon

Athlete	Event	100 m	LJ	SP	HJ	400 m	110H	DT	PV	JT	1500 m	Final	Rank
Erwin Reimer	Result	12.0	5.92	—	—	—	—	—	—	—	—	DNF	
Erwin Reimer	Points	597	538	—	—	—	—	—	—	—	—	DNF	
Osvaldo Wenzel	Result	12.2	6.25	12.43	1.65	55.3	18.2	37.11	3.20	54.93	4:34.6	6058	15
Osvaldo Wenzel	Points	556	615	661	616	614	529	628	575	680	584	6058	15

Women
Track events

Athlete	Event	Heat		Semifinal		Final	
Athlete	Event	Time	Rank	Time	Rank	Time	Rank
Raquel Martínez	100 m	??.?	5	did not advance			

== Basketball ==
7 August 1936 First Round	Chile	30–16	Turkey	Berlin
16:00	Scoring by half: 15–5, 15–11
		Report, p. 1078		Arena: Tennis Courts, Court 2 Referees: E. Ghirimoldi (Italy), Ch. Perschon (Germany), W. Balzereit (Germany)

9 August 1936 Second Round	Chile	23–18	Brazil	Berlin
18:00	Scoring by half: 10–4, 13–14
		Report, p. 1080		Arena: Tennis Courts, Court 2 Referees: E. Powers (Canada), F. Becker (Germany), H. Hammes (Germany)

11 August 1936 Third Round	Italy	27–19	Chile	Berlin
16:00	Scoring by half: 16–12, 11–7
		Report, p. 1080		Arena: Tennis Courts, Court 2 Referees: A. Selenoi (Estonia), Ch. Perschon (Germany), W. Balzereit (Germany)

== Boxing ==
Athlete	Event	Round of 32	Round of 16	Quarterfinals	Semifinals	Final	
Athlete	Event	Opposition Result	Opposition Result	Opposition Result	Opposition Result	Opposition Result	Rank
Guillermo López	Flyweight	Bye	Kaiser (GER); L RSC at Round 3	did not advance			
José Vergara	Bantamweight	Bye	Cornelis (BEL); L Points	did not advance			
Carlos Lillo	Lightweight	Hamilton-Brown (RSA); W Points	Hakim (EGY); W Points	Stepulov (EST); L Points	did not advance		
Enrique Giaverini	Welterweight	Pedersen (DEN); L Points	did not advance				

== Cycling ==
Four cyclists, all men, represented Chile in 1936.

Individual road race

- Jesús Chousal
- Jorge Guerra
- Rafael Montero
- Manuel Riquelme

Team road race

- Jesús Chousal
- Jorge Guerra
- Rafael Montero
- Manuel Riquelme

Sprint

- Manuel Riquelme

== Fencing ==
Seven fencers, all men, represented Chile in 1936.

Men's foil

- Tomás Goyoaga
- César Barros
- Hermogenes Valdebenito

Men's épée

- Tomas Barraza
- Ricardo Romero

Men's team épée

- Ricardo Romero, César Barros, Tomas Barraza, Julio Moreno, Tomás Goyoaga

Men's sabre

- Julio Moreno
- Efrain Díaz
- Tomás Goyoaga

Men's team sabre

- Efrain Díaz, Tomas Barraza, Ricardo Romero, Julio Moreno, Tomás Goyoaga

== Sailing ==
Athlete	Event	Race							Net points	Final rank
Athlete	Event	1	2	3	4	5	6	7	Net points	Final rank
Erich Wichmann-Harbeck	O-Jolle	3	8	4	23	6	7	1	130	4

== Shooting ==
Three shooters represented Chile in 1936.

50 m pistol

- Roberto Müller
- Carlos Lalanne
- Enrique Ojeda

== Swimming ==
Athlete	Event	Heat		Semifinal		Final	
Athlete	Event	Time	Rank	Time	Rank	Time	Rank
Washington Guzmán	Men's 400 m freestyle	5:19.1	6	did not advance			
Alfonso Casasempere	Men's 100 m backstroke	1:21.0	6	did not advance			
Jorge Berroeta	Men's 200 m breaststroke	DSQ	—	did not advance			
Carlos Reed	Men's 200 m breaststroke	DSQ	—	did not advance			
