= Bulgaria at the 1936 Summer Olympics =

- IOC code: BUL
- NOC: Bulgarian Olympic Committee

in Berlin, Nazi Germany 1–16 August 1936
- Competitors: 26 in 7 sports
- Flag bearer: Lyuben Doychev
- Medals: Gold 0 Silver 0 Bronze 0 Total 0

Summer Olympics appearances (overview)
- 1896; 1900–1920; 1924; 1928; 1932; 1936; 1948; 1952; 1956; 1960; 1964; 1968; 1972; 1976; 1980; 1984; 1988; 1992; 1996; 2000; 2004; 2008; 2012; 2016; 2020; 2024; 2028

Bulgaria competed at the 1936 Summer Olympics in Berlin, Germany. The nation returned to the Olympic Games after having missed the 1932 Summer Olympics due to high travel costs. 26 competitors, all men, took part in 22 events in 7 sports.

== Athletics ==
Track and Road Events

Athlete	Event	Result	Rank
Boris Haralampiev	Marathon	3:08:53.8	36

Combined Events - Decathlon

Athlete	Event	100 m	LJ	SP	HJ	400 m	110H	DT	PV	JT	1500 m	Final	Rank
Lyuben Doychev	Result	11.5	6.35	12.26	1.70	54.1	16.3	38.25	3.70	48.43	5:34.2	6307	14
Lyuben Doychev	Points	710	639	645	671	665	736	660	775	559	247	6307	14

== Cycling ==
Ten cyclists, all male, represented Bulgaria in 1936.

Road Cycling

Athlete	Event	Time	Rank
Aleksandar Nikolov	Road Race, Individual	Finished	—N/a
Kanyo Dzhambazov	Road Race, Individual	2:33:08.0	16
Nikola Nenov	Road Race, Individual	Finished	—N/a
Gennadi Simov	Road Race, Individual	Finished	—N/a
Dzhambazov; Nenov; Nikolov; Simov	Road Race, Team	Finished	—N/a

Track Cycling

Athlete	Event	Round 1		Round 2		Semi-Final		Semi-Final	
Athlete	Event	Result	Rank	Result	Rank	Result	Rank	Result	Rank
Boris Dimitrov	1km Time Trial	DNS							
Sava Gerchev; Marin Nikolov; Georgi Velinov; Bogdan Yanchev	Team Pursuit	5:10.4	13	did not advance					

Sprint

Athlete	1/16 Final	1/16 Rep	1/8 Final	1/8 Rep	Quarterfinals	Semifinals	Final	Rank
Athlete	Opposition Result	Opposition Result	Opposition Result	Opposition Result	Opposition Result	Opposition Result	Opposition Result	Rank
Nedyu Rachev	Chaillot (FRA); L	Sellinger (USA); Györffy (HUN); 3	did not advance					—N/a

== Equestrian ==
At the 1936 Summer Olympics Bulgaria participated with three competitors only in the Three-Day-Event as at the time the Eventing discipline of Equestrian Sports was a military sports competition, meaning that only military people could participate in it and the Bulgarian military had earned Olympic quotas.

Three-Day-Event (Military)
Individual

Athlete	Horse	Dressage		Cross-Country		Jumping			Rank
Athlete	Horse	Pts Lost	Rank	Pts Gained/Lost	Pen	Pts Lost	Pen	Total	Rank
Hristo Malakchiev	Mageremlek	136.8	14	30/-	20	-	10	156.8	10
Petar Angelov	Liquidator	146.6	17	9/85	40	-	30	263.7	17
Todor Semov	Lovak	DSQ							

Team

Athlete	Horse	Penalties	Total	Rank
Hristo Malakchiev; Petar Angelov; Todor Semov	Mageremlek; Liquidator; Lovak	DNF		

== Fencing ==
One male fencer represented Bulgaria in 1936 - Dimitar Vasilev.

Fencing Events

Athlete	Event	Round 1		Round 2		Semifinal		Final	
Athlete	Event	Result	Rank	Result	Rank	Result	Rank	Result	Rank
Dimitar Vasilev	Men's Foil	1/2/26	6	did not advance					
Dimitar Vasilev	Men's Épée	1/2/15	7	did not advance					
Dimitar Vasilev	Men's Sabre	4/8/17	2 Q	2/4/16	3 Q	0/0/20	6	Did not advance	—N/a

== Gymnastics ==
At the 1936 Summer Olympics the members of the Bulgarian Gymnastics Men's Team participated in all the Gymnastics Events to be eligible for the team ranking.

Individual

Athlete	Event	PB	LH	PH	Rings	FX	HB	Final
Mirchev	Points	14.133	17.300	12.800	16.467	16.300	16.933	93.933
Mirchev	Rank	78	27	86	49	54	46	66
G Dimitrov	Points	13.300	16.500	5.334	13.733	14.300	14.100	77.267
G Dimitrov	Rank	88	49	109	86	91	86	93
J Hristov	Points	13.100	13.800	10.700	16.467	16.300	16.933	93.933
J Hristov	Rank	91	93	59	84	98	99	96
Ivan Chureshki	Points	10.566	14.733	7.334	14.867	13.300	10.800	71.600
Ivan Chureshki	Rank	99	85	108	74	98	95	98
Sidov	Points	9.500	11.900	10.100	13.834	13.500	10.333	69.167
Sidov	Rank	103	99	97	85	96	97	99
Obretenov	Points	11.033	13.600	9.000	10.866	13.600	7.833	65.932
Obretenov	Rank	97	95	104	102	95	104	101
Stoychev	Points	7.567	7.200	9.800	12.900	11.833	7.657	50.867
Stoychev	Rank	108	108	100	90	105	106	106

Team

Team All-Around	Ttl Pts	Adj Pts	Rank
Bulgaria	509.200	452.333	13

== Shooting ==
Men

Athlete	Event	Final	
Athlete	Event	Score	Rank
Boris Khristov	50 m Rifle Prone	238	58
