= Cycling at the 1936 Summer Olympics – Men's individual road race =

Cycling – Men's individual road race at the Games of the XI Olympiad
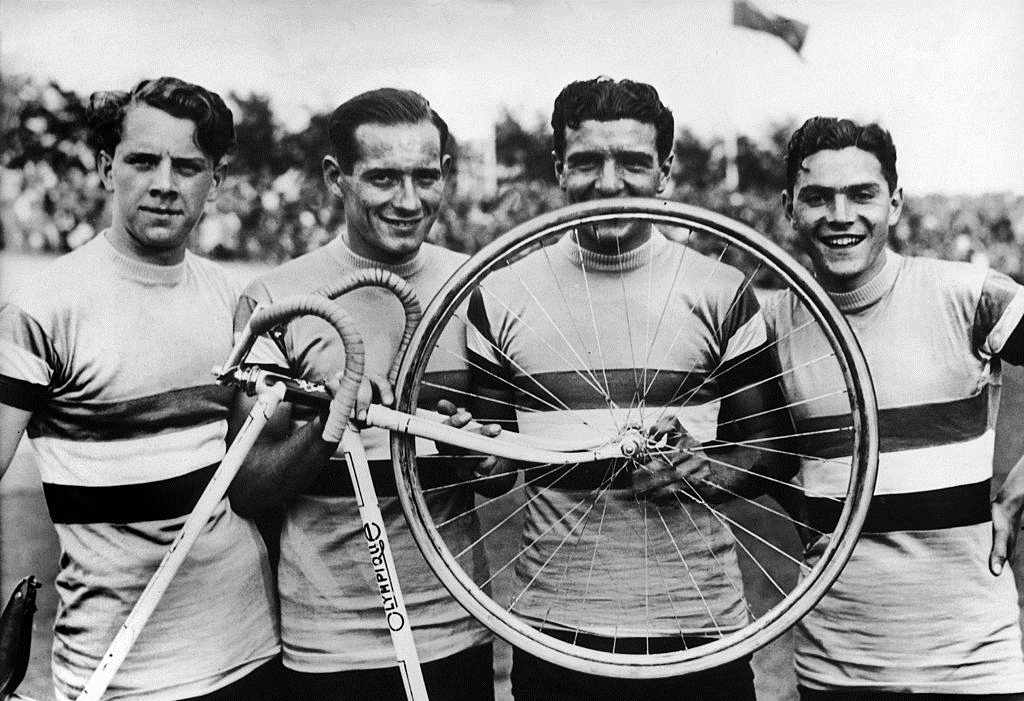
- The French team: Robert Charpentier, Guy Lapébie, Jean Goujon, Robert Dorgebray
- Venue: Avus North Curve, Berlin
- Date: 10 August 1936
- Competitors: 99 from 28 nations
- Winning time: 2:33:05.0

Medalists
1st place, gold medalist(s)		Robert Charpentier; France
2nd place, silver medalist(s)		Guy Lapébie; France
3rd place, bronze medalist(s)		Ernst Nievergelt; Switzerland

The men's individual road race cycling event at the 1936 Summer Olympics took place on 10 August over 100 km. Ninety-nine cyclists from 28 nations competed. This was the first time that the cycling road race was conducted as a mass start event since 1896 and was one of six cycling events at the 1936 Olympics. The men's team road race was held in conjunction with this event, with teams having four riders and the team time taken as sum of the team's three best finishers. The individual event was won by Robert Charpentier of France, with his teammate Guy Lapébie in second. Ernst Nievergelt of Switzerland took bronze. They were the first men's mass-start road race medals for both nations, which had not competed in 1896.

== Background ==
This was the second appearance of the event, previously held in 1896; it would be held at every Summer Olympics after 1936. It replaced the individual time trial event that had been held from 1912 to 1932 (and which would be reintroduced alongside the road race in 1996). French cyclist Robert Charpentier was the runner-up in the 1935 UCI Road World Championships. Three-speed bikes were innovative at the time, with many riders adopting them.

Germany and Great Britain made their second appearances in the event; the other 26 nations competing in 1936 each made their debut.

== Competition format and course ==
The race was on a course that covered 100 kilometres, starting and finishing at the North Curve of the Avus motor racing circuit. It followed "relatively flat roads," with elevation shifts limited to between 32 and 80 metres above sea level and the steepest grade at 46.1 metres per kilometre.

== Schedule ==
Date	Time	Round
Monday, 10 August 1936	8:00	Final

== Results ==
Some of the cyclists with unknown times may not have finished.

Rank	Cyclist	National	Time
1st place, gold medalist(s)	Robert Charpentier	France	2:33:05.0
2nd place, silver medalist(s)	Guy Lapébie	France	2:33:05.2
3rd place, bronze medalist(s)	Ernst Nievergelt	Switzerland	2:33:05.8
4	Fritz Scheller	Germany	2:33:06.0
4	Charles Holland	Great Britain	2:33:06.0
4	Robert Dorgebray	France	2:33:06.0
7	Pierino Favalli	Italy	2:33:06.2
8	Auguste Garrebeek	Belgium	2:33:06.6
8	Armand Putzeyse	Belgium	2:33:06.6
8	Talat Tunçalp	Turkey	2:33:06.6
11	Edgar Buchwalder	Switzerland	2:33:07.0
12	Frode Sørensen	Denmark	2:33:07.2
12	August Prosenik	Yugoslavia	2:33:07.2
14	Kurt Ott	Switzerland	2:33:07.6
15	Glauco Servadei	Italy	2:33:07.8
16	Tassy Johnson	Australia	2:33:08.0
16	Virgilius Altmann	Austria	2:33:08.0
16	Hans Höfner	Austria	2:33:08.0
16	Eugen Schnalek	Austria	2:33:08.0
16	Jean-François Van Der Motte	Belgium	2:33:08.0
16	Kanyo Dzhambazov	Bulgaria	2:33:08.0
16	Arne Petersen	Denmark	2:33:08.0
16	Thor Porko	Finland	2:33:08.0
16	Jean Goujon	France	2:33:08.0
16	János Bognár	Hungary	2:33:08.0
16	István Liszkay	Hungary	2:33:08.0
16	Corrado Ardizzoni	Italy	2:33:08.0
16	Jacques Majerus	Luxembourg	2:33:08.0
16	Franz Neuens	Luxembourg	2:33:08.0
16	Nico van Gageldonk	Netherlands	2:33:08.0
16	Wacław Starzyński	Poland	2:33:08.0
16	Stanisław Zieliński	Poland	2:33:08.0
16	Hennie Binneman	South Africa	2:33:08.0
16	Gottlieb Weber	Switzerland	2:33:08.0
16	Arne Berg	Sweden	2:33:08.0
16	Josef Lošek	Czechoslovakia	2:33:08.0
16	Franc Gartner	Yugoslavia	2:33:08.0
39–94	Mārtiņš Mazūrs	Latvia	2:37:08.0
39–94	Arvīds Immermanis	Latvia	2:52:08.0
39–94	Aleksejs Jurjevs	Latvia	2:52:08.0
39–94	Jānis Vītols	Latvia	2:52:08.0
39–94	Chris Wheeler	Australia	Unknown
39–94	Karl Kühn	Austria	Unknown
39–94	Jef Lowagie	Belgium	Unknown
39–94	Dertônio Ferrer	Brazil	Unknown
39–94	José Magnani	Brazil	Unknown
39–94	Hermógenes Netto	Brazil	Unknown
39–94	Nikola Nenov	Bulgaria	Unknown
39–94	Aleksandar Nikolov	Bulgaria	Unknown
39–94	Gennadi Simov	Bulgaria	Unknown
39–94	Lionel Coleman	Canada	Unknown
39–94	George Crompton	Canada	Unknown
39–94	Rusty Peden	Canada	Unknown
39–94	George Turner	Canada	Unknown
39–94	Jesús Chousal	Chile	Unknown
39–94	Jorge Guerra	Chile	Unknown
39–94	Rafael Montero	Chile	Unknown
39–94	Manuel Riquelme	Chile	Unknown
39–94	Knud Jacobsen	Denmark	Unknown
39–94	Tage Møller	Denmark	Unknown
39–94	Tauno Lindgren	Finland	Unknown
39–94	Jackie Bone	Great Britain	Unknown
39–94	Willi Meurer	Germany	Unknown
39–94	Fritz Ruland	Germany	Unknown
39–94	Emil Schöpflin	Germany	Unknown
39–94	István Adorján	Hungary	Unknown
39–94	Károly Nemes-Nótás	Hungary	Unknown
39–94	Elio Bavutti	Italy	Unknown
39–94	Adolf Schreiber	Liechtenstein	Unknown
39–94	Paul Frantz	Luxembourg	Unknown
39–94	Rudy Houtsch	Luxembourg	Unknown
39–94	René van Hove	Netherlands	Unknown
39–94	George Giles	New Zealand	Unknown
39–94	Manuel Bacigalupo	Peru	Unknown
39–94	Gregorio Caloggero	Peru	Unknown
39–94	José Mazzini	Peru	Unknown
39–94	César Peñaranda	Peru	Unknown
39–94	Mieczysław Kapiak	Poland	Unknown
39–94	Wiktor Olecki	Poland	Unknown
39–94	Ted Clayton	South Africa	Unknown
39–94	Berndt Carlsson	Sweden	Unknown
39–94	Ingvar Ericsson	Sweden	Unknown
39–94	Vilém Jakl	Czechoslovakia	Unknown
39–94	Hans Leutelt	Czechoslovakia	Unknown
39–94	Miloslav Loos	Czechoslovakia	Unknown
39–94	Kirkor Canbazyan	Turkey	Unknown
39–94	Kazım Bingen	Turkey	Unknown
39–94	Orhan Suda	Turkey	Unknown
39–94	Albert Byrd	United States	Unknown
39–94	Charles Morton	United States	Unknown
39–94	Paul Nixon	United States	Unknown
39–94	John Sinibaldi	United States	Unknown
39–94	Josip Pokupec	Yugoslavia	Unknown
39–94	Ivan Valant	Yugoslavia	Unknown
—	Bill Messer	Great Britain	DNF
—	Alick Bevan	Great Britain	DNF
—	Gerrit Schulte	Netherlands	DNF
—	Philippus Vethaak	Netherlands	DNF
—	Sven Johansson	Sweden	DNF
