= Cycling at the 1936 Summer Olympics – Men's team road race =

Cycling - Men's team road race at the Games of the XI Olympiad
- Venue: Avus North Curve, Berlin
- Dates: 10 August 1936
- Competitors: 88 (individuals) 22 (teams) from 22 nations

Medalists
1st place, gold medalist(s)		Robert Charpentier; Robert Dorgebray; Guy Lapébie; France
2nd place, silver medalist(s)		Edgar Buchwalder; Ernst Nievergelt; Kurt Ott; Switzerland
3rd place, bronze medalist(s)		Auguste Garrebeek; Armand Putzeyse; Jean-François Van Der Motte; Belgium

The men's team road race cycling event at the 1936 Olympic Games took place on 10 August and was one of six events at the 1936 Olympics. It was competed as a 100 km massed start event in conjunction with the Men's individual road race. Teams had four riders and the team time taken as sum of the team's three best finishers. Only the first five teams across the line recorded a time, due to a failure with the timekeeping system.

== Results ==
=== Final ===
Rank	Name	Nationality	Time	Notes
1st place, gold medalist(s)	Robert Charpentier; Robert Dorgebray; Guy Lapébie; Jean Goujon	France	7:39:16.2	
2nd place, silver medalist(s)	Edgar Buchwalder; Ernst Nievergelt; Kurt Ott; Gottlieb Weber	Switzerland	7:39:20.4	
3rd place, bronze medalist(s)	Auguste Garrebeek; Armand Putzeyse; Jean-François Van Der Motte; Jef Lowagie	Belgium	7:39:21.0	
4	Pierino Favalli; Glauco Servadei; Corrado Ardizzoni; Elio Bavutti	Italy	7:39:22.0	
5	Virgilius Altmann; Hans Höfner; Eugen Schnalek; Karl Kühn	Austria	7:39:24.0	
AC	Mārtiņš Mazūrs; Arvīds Immermanis; Aleksejs Jurjevs; Jānis Vītols	Latvia	8:21:24.0e	Estimated time
AC	Kanyo Dzhambazov; Aleksandar Nikolov; Gennadi Simov; Nikola Nenov	Bulgaria	no time	
AC	Rusty Peden; George Crompton; George Turner; Lionel Coleman	Canada	no time	
AC	Jesús Chousal; Jorge Guerra; Manuel Riquelme; Rafael Montero	Chile	no time	
AC	Hans Leutelt; Josef Lošek; Miloslav Loos; Vilém Jakl	Czechoslovakia	no time	
AC	Frode Sørensen; Arne Petersen; Knud Jacobsen; Tage Møller	Denmark	no time	
AC	Fritz Scheller; Emil Schöpflin; Fritz Ruland; Willi Meurer	Germany	no time	
AC	István Liszkay; János Bognár; István Adorján; Károly Nemes-Nótás	Hungary	no time	
AC	Franz Neuens; Jacques Majerus; Paul Frantz; Rudy Houtsch	Luxembourg	no time	
AC	César Peñaranda; Gregorio Caloggero; José Mazzini; Manuel Bacigalupo	Peru	no time	
AC	Stanisław Zieliński; Wacław Starzyński; Mieczysław Kapiak; Wiktor Olecki	Poland	no time	
AC	Arne Berg; Berndt Carlsson; Ingvar Ericsson; Sven Johansson	Sweden	no time	
AC	Talat Tunçalp; Kirkor Canbazyan; Kazım Bingen; Orhan Suda	Turkey	no time	
AC	Albert Byrd; Charles Morton; John Sinibaldi; Paul Nixon	United States	no time	
AC	August Prosenik; Franc Gartner; Ivan Valant; Josip Pokupec	Yugoslavia	no time	
AC	Charles Holland; Jackie Bone; Alick Bevan; Bill Messer	Great Britain	no time	DNF
AC	Nico van Gageldonk; Gerrit Schulte; Philippus Vethaak; René van Hove	Netherlands	no time	DNF
