= Peru at the 1936 Summer Olympics =

- IOC code: PER
- NOC: Peruvian Olympic Committee

in Berlin
- Competitors: 40 (all men) in 8 sports
- Flag bearer: Víctor Flores
- Medals: Gold 0 Silver 0 Bronze 0 Total 0

Summer Olympics appearances (overview)
- 1900; 1904–1932; 1936; 1948; 1952; 1956; 1960; 1964; 1968; 1972; 1976; 1980; 1984; 1988; 1992; 1996; 2000; 2004; 2008; 2012; 2016; 2020; 2024

Peru competed in the Summer Olympic Games for the first time at the 1936 Summer Olympics in Berlin, Germany. 40 competitors, all men, took part in 16 events in 8 sports. Peru's participation in the Olympic Games forced the authorities to suspend the Peruvian football league for 1936.

== Football controversy ==
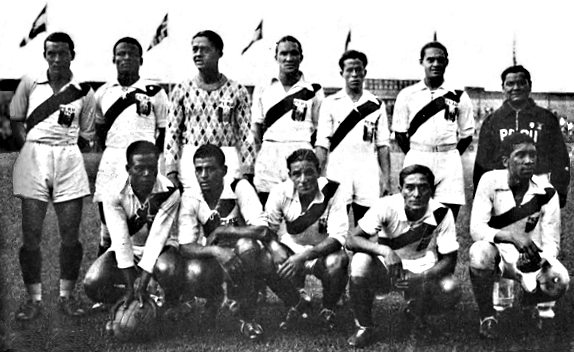
1936 Berlin Summer Olympics team. Front: Adelfo Magallanes, Jorge Alcalde, Teodoro Fernández, José Morales, and Alejandro Villanueva. Back: Carlos Tovar, Víctor Guarderas Lavalle, Juan Valdivieso, Arturo Fernández, Segundo Castillo, and Orestes Jordán.

Austria played Peru in an astonishing game leading to a huge political row.

Time Magazine reported: In Lima President Oscar Benavides of Peru last week addressed an angry crowd: "I have just received cables from Argentina, Chile, Uruguay and Mexico supporting the Peruvian attitude against the crafty Berlin decision." The crowd, which had already torn an Olympic flag, gathered to listen to more speeches at the Plaza San Martin. Later it threw stones to the German Consulate's windows until police arrived in trucks. At Callao, Lima's seaport, workmen on the docks refused to load two German vessels.

The "crafty Berlin decision" concerned a soccer game on the fortnight in which the Peruvians overturned a 2-goal deficit against Austria to take the tie into extra-time and win the match 4-2, with a goal scored in the last minute of extra-time. After the game, Austria argued that Peruvian players had manhandled them, and that spectators, one of them brandishing a revolver, had swarmed down on the field. FIFA ordered the game replayed behind closed doors, so Peru's whole Olympic team of 40 promptly withdrew from the Games in protest; the game was awarded to Austria by default. Said Miguel Dasso of the Peruvian Olympic Committee: "We've no faith in European athletics. We have come here and found a bunch of merchants."

== Athletics ==
Athlete	Events	Heat		Quarterfinal		Semifinal		Final	Rank
Athlete	Events	Result	Rank	Result	Rank	Result	Rank	Result	Rank
Antonio Cuba	Men's 100 metres		5	did not advance					
Francisco Valdez Bravo	Men's 800 metres		7	—N/a		did not advance			
Carlos Marcerano	Men's 800 metres	2:00:8	6	—N/a		did not advance			

== Basketball ==
Roster:

Miguel Godoy, Luis Jacob, Roberto Rospigliosi, Koko Cárdenas, Fernando Ruiz, "Canon" Ore, Jose Carlos Godoy, Armando Rossi, Rolando Bacigalupo, Manuel Fiestas, Willy Dasso, Antuco Flecha (Coach: Pedro Vera)

First Round

August 7
5:00 pm

Game 3

Peru	35–22	Egypt

Tennis Stadium, Berlin
Referees: T. Suvoong (China)

Second Round

August 9
5:00 pm

Game 4

Peru	29–21	(Taiwan) China

Tennis Stadium, Berlin
Referees: V. Ugolini (Italy)

Third Round

Peru was awarded a bye to the next round.

Fourth Round

Poland won by walkover and was awarded 2 points.

Poland	2–0	Peru

Tennis Stadium, Berlin

Fifth Place Match

Uruguay won by walkover and was awarded 2 points.

Uruguay	2–0	Peru

Tennis Stadium, Berlin

== Cycling ==
=== Road ===
Team

Peru finished without a time during the team road race.

Men

Rider	Event	Time	Rank
Manuel Bacigalupo	Road race	no time	
Gregorio Caloggero	Road race	no time	
José Mazzini	Road race	no time	
César Peñaranda	Road race	no time	

Times were not recorded for any of the four competing athletes because they finished after the 16th place.

=== Track ===
Sprints

Athlete	Event	Round One		Round 1 (repechage)		Round 2	Round 3	Semifinals	Final	Bronze medal race
Athlete	Event	Opposition Time Speed (km/h)	Rank	Opposition Time Speed	Rank	Opposition Time Speed	Opposition Time Speed	Opposition Time Speed	Opposition Time Speed	Opposition Time Speed
José Mazzini	Men's sprint	Karl Magnussen (DEN); L, L	2	Dunc Gray (AUS); L, L Ted Clayton (RSA); L, L	3	did not advance				

== Diving ==
Men'

Athlete	Events	Preliminary		Semifinal		Final	
Athlete	Events	Points	Rank	Points	Rank	Points	Rank
Alfredo Alvarez	3 m springboard	DNF					24

== Football ==
First round

August 6, 1936
17:30

Peru	7–3	Finland
Fernández 17' 33' 47' 49' 70'; Villanueva 21' 67'	Report	Kanerva 42' (pen.); Grönlund 75'; Larvo 80'

Berlin Hertha-BSC-Platz
Attendance: 2.500
Referee: Rinaldo Barlassina (ITA)

Quarter finals

August 8, 1936
17:30

Peru	4–2 (a.e.t.)	Austria
Alcalde 75'; Villanueva 81' 117'; Fernández 119'	Report	Wergin 23'; Steinmetz 37'

Berlin Hertha-BSC-Platz
Attendance: 5.000
Referee: Thoralf Kristiansen (NOR)

Due to a pitch invasion, the match was declared null and void, and ordered to be replayed on August 10. Peru objected to the replay decision and withdrew from the tournament.

Replay

August 10, 1936
17:30

Peru	Walkover	Austria

Berlin Poststadion
Attendance: 0
Referee: Rinaldo Barlassina (ITA)

== Modern pentathlon ==
One male pentathlete represented Peru in 1936.

Men

Athlete	Shooting (10 m air pistol)			Fencing (épée one touch)			Swimming (200 m freestyle)			Riding (show jumping)			Running (3000 m)			Total points	Final rank
Athlete	Score	Rank	MP points	Results	Rank	MP points	Time	Rank	MP points	Penalties	Rank	MP points	Time	Rank	MP points	Total points	Final rank
José Escribens	DNF																

== Shooting ==
Men

Rifle

Athlete	Event	Score	Rank
Jorge Patiño	50 m rifle prone	287	51

== Swimming ==
Athlete	Event	Heat		Semifinal		Final	
Athlete	Event	Time	Rank	Time	Rank	Time	Rank
Arturo Álvarez	100 m freestyle	1:04.9	7	did not advance			
Juan Paz	100 m freestyle	1:05.6	7	did not advance			
Walter Ledgard	400 m freestyle	5:05.5	2	DNF	7	did not advance	
