= Turkey at the 1936 Summer Olympics =

- IOC code: TUR
- NOC: Turkish National Olympic Committee

in Berlin
- Competitors: 48 in 7 sports
- Flag bearer: Saim Polatkan
- Medals Ranked 19th: Gold 1 Silver 0 Bronze 1 Total 2

Summer Olympics appearances (overview)
- 1908; 1912; 1920; 1924; 1928; 1932; 1936; 1948; 1952; 1956; 1960; 1964; 1968; 1972; 1976; 1980; 1984; 1988; 1992; 1996; 2000; 2004; 2008; 2012; 2016; 2020; 2024; 2028

Other related appearances
- 1906 Intercalated Games

Turkey competed at the 1936 Summer Olympics in Berlin, Germany. 48 competitors, 46 men and 2 women, took part in 26 events in 7 sports. Turkey won its first-ever Olympic medals at these games.

== Medalists ==
Medal	Name	Sport	Event
Gold	Yaşar Erkan	Wrestling	Men's Greco-Roman featherweight
Bronze	Ahmet Kireççi	Wrestling	Men's freestyle middleweight

== Basketball ==
First Round

7 August 1936
16:00

Report, p. 1078

Chile 30, Turkey 16
Scoring by half: 15–5, 15–11

Tennis Courts, Court 2
Referees: E. Ghirimoldi (Italy), Ch. Perschon (Germany), W. Balzereit (Germany)

First consolation round

8 August 1936
17:00

Report, p. 1079

Egypt 33, Turkey 23
Scoring by half: 19–14, 14–9

Tennis Courts, Court 1
Referees: M. Creux (France), J, Christensen (Germany), H. Kalshaus (Germany)

== Cycling ==
Four cyclists, all male, represented Turkey in 1936

Individual road race

- Kazım Bingen
- Kirkor Canbazyan
- Orhan Suda
- Talat Tunçalp

Team road race

- Kazım Bingen
- Kirkor Canbazyan
- Orhan Suda
- Talat Tunçalp

== Fencing ==
Seven fencers, five men and two women, represented Turkey in 1936.

Men's sabre

- Enver Balkan
- Orhan Adaş
- Cihat Teğin

Men's team sabre

- Ilhami Çene, Enver Balkan, Cihat Teğin, Abdul Halim Tokmakçioğlu, Orhan Adaş

Women's foil

- Suat Aşani
- Halet Çambel

== Football ==
Round of 16

3 August 1936
17:30

Turkey	0–4	Norway
	Report	Martinsen 30', 70'; Brustad 53'; Kvammen 80'

Mommsenstadion, Berlin
Attendance: 8,000
Referee: Giuseppe Scarpi (Italy)

== Wrestling ==
=== Freestyle ===
Men's bantamweight

- Ahmet Çakıryıldız 6th

Men's featherweight

- Yaşar Erkan AC

Men's lightweight

- Sadık Soğancı AC

Men's welterweight

- Hüseyin Erçetin AC

Men's middleweight

- Ahmet Kireççi Bronze

Men's light heavyweight

- Mustafa Avcioğlu AC

Men's heavyweight

- Mehmet Çoban AC

=== Greco-Roman ===
Men's bantamweight

- Hüseyin Erkmen AC

Men's featherweight

- Yaşar Erkan Gold

Men's lightweight

- Saim Arıkan AC

Men's welterweight

- Nurettin Baytorun 6th

Men's middleweight

- Adnan Yurdaer AC

Men's light heavyweight

- Mustafa Avcioğlu AC

Men's heavyweight

- Mehmet Çoban 4th
