= Cycling at the 1936 Summer Olympics – Men's sprint =

Cycling at the Olympics

Men's sprint at the Games of the XI Olympiad
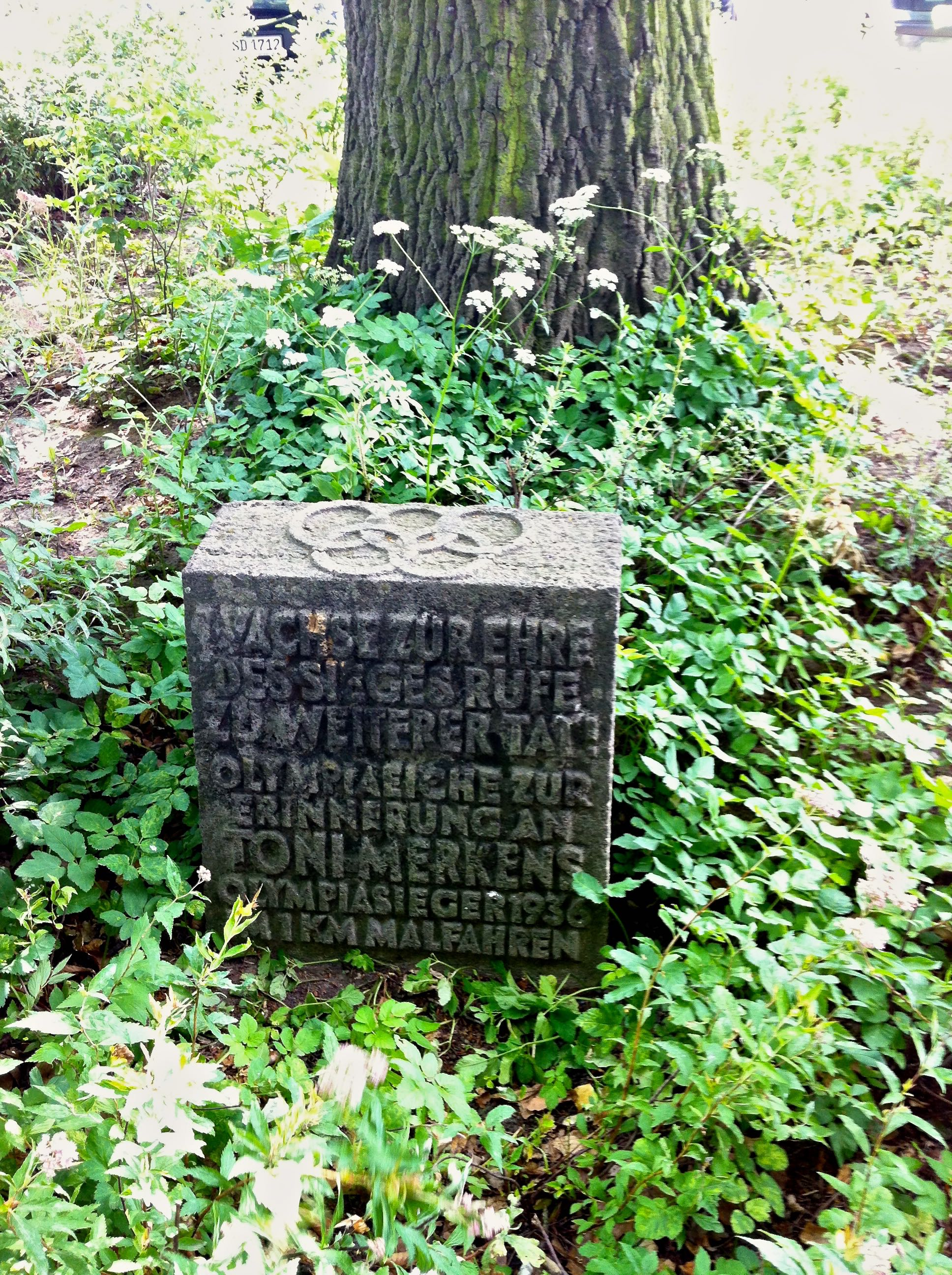
- Stone commemorating Toni Merkens
- Venue: Olympic Cycling Stadium, Berlin
- Dates: 6–7 August 1936
- Competitors: 20 from 20 nations

Medalists
1st place, gold medalist(s)		Toni Merkens; Germany
2nd place, silver medalist(s)		Arie van Vliet; Netherlands
3rd place, bronze medalist(s)		Louis Chaillot; France

The men's sprint cycling event at the 1936 Summer Olympics took place on 6 and 7 August and was one of six events at the 1936 Olympics. There were 20 competitors from 20 nations, with each nation limited to one cyclist. The event was won, in a disputed final, by Toni Merkens of Germany, the nation's first medal in the men's sprint. Arie van Vliet took the silver medal, the fifth consecutive Games that a Dutch cyclist had finished in the top two. Louis Chaillot of France became the first man to win multiple medals in the event, adding a bronze to his 1932 silver; it was the fourth consecutive podium appearance for France.

When van Vliet began to overtake Merkens in the first race of the final, Merkens swerved to the right and blatantly interfered with Van Vliet. No penalty was called, and a disconcerted van Vliet lost the second race. The Dutch team protested, but instead of being disqualified, Merkens was fined 100 marks instead.

== Background ==
This was the eighth appearance of the event, which has been held at every Summer Olympics except 1904 and 1912. Two of the semifinalists from 1932 returned: Louis Chaillot of France, who had won the silver medal, and Dunc Gray of Australia, who had not started the bronze medal race but had won the track time trial event. The favorites in 1936, however, were Toni Merkens of Germany and Arie van Vliet of the Netherlands, the winner and runner-up in the 1935 World Championship.

The Republic of China, New Zealand, Norway, and Peru each made their debut in the men's sprint. France made its eighth appearance, the only nation to have competed at every appearance of the event.

== Competition format ==
This track cycling event consisted of numerous rounds. Each race involved the riders starting simultaneously and next to each other, from a standing start. Because the early part of races tend to be slow-paced and highly tactical, only the time for the last 200 metres of the one-kilometre race is recorded.

The competition involved five main rounds and a repechage. In the first round, there were ten heats of two cyclists each. The winner of each heat advanced directly to the second round, while the loser competed in a repechage. The repechage featured four heats, two of three cyclists and two of two cyclists. The last-placed finisher in each repechage was eliminated, while the winner advanced along with the second-place rider in the three-man heats. Round 2 and the quarterfinals were each head-to-head, single-elimination races: eight heats in round 2 and four heats in the quarterfinals. The semifinals were also head-to-head competitions, with the winners advancing to the final and the losers going to a bronze medal match.

The 1932 competition had introduced the best-of-three format for the final (and only the final); the 1936 version expanded that best-of-three format to the bronze medal match as well. The two cyclists in each match competed up to three times, with the first cyclist to win two races being the winner.

== Records ==
The records for the sprint are 200 metre flying time trial records, kept for the qualifying round in later Games as well as for the finish of races.

World record	Unknown	Unknown^{*}	Unknown	Unknown
Olympic record	Thomas Johnson (GBR)	11.8	Antwerp, Belgium	9 August 1920

^{*} World records were not tracked by the UCI until 1954.

No new Olympic record was set during the competition.

== Schedule ==
Date	Time	Round
Thursday, 6 August 1936	18:00	Round 1 Repechage
Friday, 7 August 1936	18:00	Round 2 Quarterfinals; Semifinals; Finals

== Results ==
=== Round 1 ===
The winner in each heat qualified for the second round. The loser was relegated to the repechage for another chance at qualifying.

==== Round 1 heat 1 ====
Rank	Cyclist	Nation	Time	Notes
1	Henri Collard	Belgium	13.2	Q
2	Dunc Gray	Australia		R

==== Round 1 heat 2 ====
Rank	Cyclist	Nation	Time	Notes
1	Louis Chaillot	France	12.8	Q
2	Nedyu Rachev	Bulgaria		R

==== Round 1 heat 3 ====
Rank	Cyclist	Nation	Time	Notes
1	Ray Hicks	Great Britain	13.6	Q
2	Manuel Riquelme	Chile		R

==== Round 1 heat 4 ====
Rank	Cyclist	Nation	Time	Notes
1	Arie van Vliet	Netherlands	12.6	Q
2	Doug Peace	Canada		R

==== Round 1 heat 5 ====
Rank	Cyclist	Nation	Time	Notes
1	Benedetto Pola	Italy	14.0	Q
2	Howard Wing	Republic of China		R

==== Round 1 heat 6 ====
Rank	Cyclist	Nation	Time	Notes
1	Werner Wägelin	Switzerland	12.4	Q
2	Haakon Sandtorp	Norway		R

==== Round 1 heat 7 ====
Rank	Cyclist	Nation	Time	Notes
1	George Giles	New Zealand	12.6	Q
2	Imre Győrffy	Hungary		R

==== Round 1 heat 8 ====
Rank	Cyclist	Nation	Time	Notes
1	Toni Merkens	Germany	12.8	Q
2	Al Sellinger	United States		R

==== Round 1 heat 9 ====
Rank	Cyclist	Nation	Time	Notes
1	Franz Dusika	Austria	15.0	Q
2	Ted Clayton	South Africa		R

==== Round 1 heat 10 ====
Rank	Cyclist	Nation	Time	Notes
1	Karl Magnussen	Denmark	13.2	Q
2	José Mazzini	Peru		R

==== Repechage ====
The last place finisher in each repechage was eliminated. The winner of each heat advanced to the second round, along with the second place finisher in heats where there were three cyclists.

==== Repechage heat 1 ====
Rank	Cyclist	Nation	Time	Notes
1	Dunc Gray	Australia	13.0	Q
2	Ted Clayton	South Africa		Q
3	José Mazzini	Peru		

==== Repechage heat 2 ====
Rank	Cyclist	Nation	Time	Notes
1	Al Sellinger	United States	13.4	Q
2	Imre Győrffy	Hungary		Q
3	Nedyu Rachev	Bulgaria		

==== Repechage heat 3 ====
Rank	Cyclist	Nation	Time	Notes
1	Haakon Sandtorp	Norway	13.0	Q
2	Manuel Riquelme	Chile		

==== Repechage heat 4 ====
Rank	Cyclist	Nation	Time	Notes
1	Doug Peace	Canada	15.2	Q
2	Howard Wing	Republic of China		

=== Round 2 ===
The winner of each heat advanced; the loser was eliminated.

==== Round 2 heat 1 ====
Rank	Cyclist	Nation	Time	Notes
1	Karl Magnussen	Denmark	13.4	Q
2	Imre Győrffy	Hungary		

==== Round 2 heat 2 ====
Rank	Cyclist	Nation	Time	Notes
1	Toni Merkens	Germany	13.0	Q
2	Haakon Sandtorp	Norway		

==== Round 2 heat 3 ====
Rank	Cyclist	Nation	Time	Notes
1	Werner Wägelin	Switzerland	13.4	Q
2	Ted Clayton	South Africa		

==== Round 2 heat 4 ====
Rank	Cyclist	Nation	Time	Notes
1	Benedetto Pola	Italy	12.6	Q
2	George Giles	New Zealand		

==== Round 2 heat 5 ====
Rank	Cyclist	Nation	Time	Notes
1	Arie van Vliet	Netherlands	12.0	Q
2	Franz Dusika	Austria		

==== Round 2 heat 6 ====
Rank	Cyclist	Nation	Time	Notes
1	Dunc Gray	Australia	12.2	Q
2	Ray Hicks	Great Britain		

==== Round 2 heat 7 ====
Rank	Cyclist	Nation	Time	Notes
1	Louis Chaillot	France	12.0	Q
2	Doug Peace	Canada		

==== Round 2 heat 8 ====
Rank	Cyclist	Nation	Time	Notes
1	Henri Collard	Belgium	13.2	Q
2	Al Sellinger	United States		

=== Quarterfinals ===
The winners qualified for the semifinals; the losers were eliminated.

==== Quarterfinal 1 ====
Rank	Cyclist	Nation	Time	Notes
1	Louis Chaillot	France	12.6	Q
2	Karl Magnussen	Denmark		

==== Quarterfinal 2 ====
Rank	Cyclist	Nation	Time	Notes
1	Arie van Vliet	Netherlands	13.0	Q
2	Dunc Gray	Australia		

==== Quarterfinal 3 ====
Rank	Cyclist	Nation	Time	Notes
1	Benedetto Pola	Italy	12.6	Q
2	Werner Wägelin	Switzerland		

==== Quarterfinal 4 ====
Rank	Cyclist	Nation	Time	Notes
1	Toni Merkens	Germany	13.0	Q
2	Henri Collard	Belgium		

=== Semifinals ===
The semifinal winners advanced to the gold medal final, while the losers competed in the bronze medal final.

==== Semifinal 1 ====
Rank	Cyclist	Nation	Time	Notes
1	Toni Merkens	Germany	12.4	Q
2	Benedetto Pola	Italy		B

==== Semifinal 2 ====
Rank	Cyclist	Nation	Time	Notes
1	Arie van Vliet	Netherlands	12.0	Q
2	Louis Chaillot	France		B

=== Finals ===
Both the gold and bronze medal finals were conducted as best-of-three competitions. In each case, the same cyclist won both of the first two races, making a third race unnecessary. Merkens was fined for "deviating from the racing lane" in the first race of the final, though was allowed to finish the competition.

==== Bronze medal match ====
Rank	Cyclist	Nation	Race 1	Race 2	Race 3
3rd place, bronze medalist(s)	Louis Chaillot	France	12.2	12.0	—
4	Benedetto Pola	Italy			—

==== Final ====
Rank	Cyclist	Nation	Race 1	Race 2	Race 3
1st place, gold medalist(s)	Toni Merkens	Germany	11.8	11.8	—
2nd place, silver medalist(s)	Arie van Vliet	Netherlands			—
