= Wrestling at the 1936 Summer Olympics – Men's Greco-Roman featherweight =

Men's Greco-Roman featherweight at the Games of the XI Olympiad
- Venue: Deutschlandhalle
- Dates: 6–9 August 1936
- Competitors: 19 from 19 nations

Medalists
1st place, gold medalist(s)		Yaşar Erkan	Turkey
2nd place, silver medalist(s)		Aarne Reini	Finland
3rd place, bronze medalist(s)		Einar Karlsson	Sweden

The men's Greco-Roman featherweight competition at the 1936 Summer Olympics in Berlin took place from 6 August to 9 August at the Deutschlandhalle. Nations were limited to one competitor. This weight class was limited to wrestlers weighing up to 61 kg.

This Greco-Roman wrestling competition continued to use the "bad points" elimination system introduced at the 1928 Summer Olympics, with a slight modification. Each round featured all wrestlers pairing off and wrestling one bout (with one wrestler having a bye if there were an odd number). The loser received 3 points if the loss was by fall or unanimous decision and 2 points if the decision was 2-1 (this was the modification from prior years, where all losses were 3 points). The winner received 1 point if the win was by decision and 0 points if the win was by fall. At the end of each round, any wrestler with at least 5 points was eliminated.

== Schedule ==
Date	Event
6 August 1936	Round 1
7 August 1936	Round 2 Round 3
8 August 1936	Round 4
9 August 1936	Round 5 Round 6 Round 7

== Results ==
=== Round 1 ===
Six wrestlers made it through the first round with 0 bad points, 5 by wins via fall (or opponent withdrawal) and 1 through a bye. The four other winners by decision each received 1 point. Sestak lost by a split decision and received 2 points. Seven of the eight remaining losers were defeated by fall or unanimous decision and received 3 points. Nielsen was unable to finish his bout due to injury and withdrew. Scherpenisse also withdrew after his bout.

Bouts

Winner	Nation	Victory Type	Loser	Nation
Einar Karlsson	Sweden	Fall	Ernst Lehmann	Switzerland
Henryk Szlązak	Poland	Fall	Gyula Móri	Hungary
František Janda	Czechoslovakia	Decision, 2–1	Tomo Šestak	Yugoslavia
Sebastian Hering	Germany	Fall	Ion Horvath	Romania
Eugéne Kracher	France	Decision, 3–0	Norman Morrell	Great Britain
Aarne Reini	Finland	Decision, 3–0	Erich Fincsusz	Austria
Krisjānis Kundziņš	Latvia	Fall	August Scherpenisse	Belgium
Valentino Borgia	Italy	Decision, 3–0	Nikolaos Biris	Greece
Yaşar Erkan	Turkey	Withdrawal	Robert Nielsen	Denmark
Hideichi Yoshioka	Japan	Bye	N/A	N/A

Points

Rank	Wrestler	Nation	Start	Earned	Total
1	Yaşar Erkan	Turkey	0	0	0
1	Sebastian Hering	Germany	0	0	0
1	Einar Karlsson	Sweden	0	0	0
1	Krisjánis Kundsinsch	Latvia	0	0	0
1	Henryk Slazak	Poland	0	0	0
1	Hideichi Yoshioka	Japan	0	0	0
7	Valentino Borgia	Italy	0	1	1
7	František Janda	Czechoslovakia	0	1	1
7	Eugéne Kracher	France	0	1	1
7	Aarne Reini	Finland	0	1	1
11	Tomo Sestak	Yugoslavia	0	2	2
12	Nikolaos Biris	Greece	0	3	3
12	Erich Fincsusz	Austria	0	3	3
12	Ion Horvath	Romania	0	3	3
12	Ernst Lehmann	Switzerland	0	3	3
12	Gyula Móri	Hungary	0	3	3
12	Norman Morrell	Great Britain	0	3	3
18	August Scherpenisse	Belgium	0	3	3r
18	Robert Nielsen	Denmark	0	3	3r

=== Round 2 ===
The lead group of six was cut to three, with Erkan having a bye and Hering and Slazak each winning their second decision by fall to stay at 0 points. Two wrestlers finished the second round with 1 point (one win by fall and one win by decision, in either order). Borgia earned his second point with a second win by decision. Four wrestlers moved to 3 points (win by fall or bye and loss by unanimous decision or fall). Three stayed barely alive with 4 points (win by decision and loss by unanimous decision or fall). Four were eliminated with two losses; of these, Sestak had the best record with 5 points rather than 6 for the others due to his first loss coming via split decision.

Bouts

Winner	Nation	Victory Type	Loser	Nation
Einar Karlsson	Sweden	Decision, 3–0	Hideichi Yoshioka	Japan
Henryk Slazak	Poland	Fall	Ernst Lehmann	Switzerland
Gyula Móri	Hungary	Fall	Tomo Sestak	Yugoslavia
Ion Horvath	Romania	Decision, 3–0	František Janda	Czechoslovakia
Sebastian Hering	Germany	Fall	Norman Morrell	Great Britain
Aarne Reini	Finland	Fall	Eugéne Kracher	France
Nikolaos Biris	Greece	Fall	Erich Fincsusz	Austria
Valentino Borgia	Italy	Decision, 3–0	Krisjánis Kundsinsch	Latvia
Yaşar Erkan	Turkey	Bye	N/A	N/A

Points

Rank	Wrestler	Nation	Start	Earned	Total
1	Yaşar Erkan	Turkey	0	0	0
1	Sebastian Hering	Germany	0	0	0
1	Henryk Slazak	Poland	0	0	0
4	Einar Karlsson	Sweden	0	1	1
4	Aarne Reini	Finland	1	0	1
6	Valentino Borgia	Italy	1	1	2
7	Nikolaos Biris	Greece	3	0	3
7	Krisjánis Kundsinsch	Latvia	0	3	3
7	Gyula Móri	Hungary	3	0	3
7	Hideichi Yoshioka	Japan	0	3	3
11	Ion Horvath	Romania	3	1	4
11	František Janda	Czechoslovakia	1	3	4
11	Eugéne Kracher	France	1	3	4
14	Tomo Sestak	Yugoslavia	2	3	5
15	Erich Fincsusz	Austria	3	3	6
15	Ernst Lehmann	Switzerland	3	3	6
15	Norman Morrell	Great Britain	3	3	6

=== Round 3 ===
Erkan finished the round in sole possession of the lead, winning a second bout by fall (along with an earlier bye) to stay at 0 points. Hering's third win was his first by decision, moving him to 1 point. Borgia and Karlsson also each ended the round at 3–0, but they had two wins by decision and one by fall to sit at 2 points. Slazak picked up his first points in the round, earning 3 with the loss. Móri and Kundsinsch also stayed at 3 points with wins by fall in the round. Horvath avoided elimination with a win by fall to stay at 4 points; Reini joined him at 4 points by earning 3 in a loss. Four men were eliminated with their second loss this round, finishing at either 6 or 7 points depending on the quality of their wins.

Bouts

Winner	Nation	Victory Type	Loser	Nation
Yaşar Erkan	Turkey	Fall	Hideichi Yoshioka	Japan
Einar Karlsson	Sweden	Decision, 3–0	Henryk Slazak	Poland
Gyula Móri	Hungary	Fall	František Janda	Czechoslovakia
Ion Horvath	Romania	Fall	Eugéne Kracher	France
Sebastian Hering	Germany	Decision, 3–0	Aarne Reini	Finland
Krisjánis Kundsinsch	Latvia	Fall	Nikolaos Biris	Greece
Valentino Borgia	Italy	Bye	N/A	N/A

Points

Rank	Wrestler	Nation	Start	Earned	Total
1	Yaşar Erkan	Turkey	0	0	0
2	Sebastian Hering	Germany	0	1	1
3	Valentino Borgia	Italy	2	0	2
3	Einar Karlsson	Sweden	1	1	2
5	Krisjánis Kundsinsch	Latvia	3	0	3
5	Gyula Móri	Hungary	3	0	3
5	Henryk Slazak	Poland	0	3	3
8	Ion Horvath	Romania	4	0	4
8	Aarne Reini	Finland	1	3	4
10	Nikolaos Biris	Greece	3	3	6
10	Hideichi Yoshioka	Japan	3	3	6
12	František Janda	Czechoslovakia	4	3	7
12	Eugéne Kracher	France	4	3	7

=== Round 4 ===
Erkan won by fall again, maintaining his 0 point record; the loss eliminated Borgia, despite it being his first, because he had earned 2 points previously by wins via decision. Hering earned a second point in giving Slazak his second loss, eliminating the latter. Karlsson also finished the round at 2 points, staying there by defeating Móri by fall (Móri was also eliminated). Kundsinsch's bye kept him at 3 points. Reini and Horvath faced off in a potential double-elimination bout as both had 4 points and a decision would push both out, but Reini won by fall to remain in competition. Thus, all four losers in the round were eliminated while all four winners (plus the man with the bye) remained alive.

Bouts

Winner	Nation	Victory Type	Loser	Nation
Yaşar Erkan	Turkey	Fall	Valentino Borgia	Italy
Einar Karlsson	Sweden	Fall	Gyula Móri	Hungary
Sebastian Hering	Germany	Decision, 3–0	Henryk Slazak	Poland
Aarne Reini	Finland	Fall	Ion Horvath	Romania
Krisjánis Kundsinsch	Latvia	Bye	N/A	N/A

Points

Rank	Wrestler	Nation	Start	Earned	Total
1	Yaşar Erkan	Turkey	0	0	0
2	Sebastian Hering	Germany	1	1	2
2	Einar Karlsson	Sweden	2	0	2
4	Krisjánis Kundsinsch	Latvia	3	0	3
5	Aarne Reini	Finland	4	0	4
6	Valentino Borgia	Italy	2	3	5
7	Gyula Móri	Hungary	3	3	6
7	Henryk Slazak	Poland	3	3	6
9	Ion Horvath	Romania	4	3	7

=== Round 5 ===
Again, and somewhat unusually for the format, the losers were eliminated but the winners continued. Erkan received his first point, a single for beating Kundsinsch by decision. Karlsson also won by decision over Hering, receiving his third point. Reini avoided any chance of elimination with a bye in the round.

Bouts

Winner	Nation	Victory Type	Loser	Nation
Yaşar Erkan	Turkey	Decision, 3–0	Krisjánis Kundsinsch	Latvia
Einar Karlsson	Sweden	Decision, 3–0	Sebastian Hering	Germany
Aarne Reini	Finland	Bye	N/A	N/A

Points

Rank	Wrestler	Nation	Start	Earned	Total
1	Yaşar Erkan	Turkey	0	1	1
2	Einar Karlsson	Sweden	2	1	3
3	Aarne Reini	Finland	4	0	4
4	Sebastian Hering	Germany	2	3	5
5	Krisjánis Kundsinsch	Latvia	3	3	6

=== Round 6 ===
In the sixth round, Reini gave Erkan the latter's first loss, putting both men at 4 points. Karlsson had a bye, staying at 3 points.

Bouts

Winner	Nation	Victory Type	Loser	Nation
Aarne Reini	Finland	Fall	Yaşar Erkan	Turkey
Einar Karlsson	Sweden	Bye	N/A	N/A

Points

Rank	Wrestler	Nation	Start	Earned	Total
1	Einar Karlsson	Sweden	3	0	3
2	Yaşar Erkan	Turkey	1	3	4
3	Aarne Reini	Finland	4	0	4

=== Round 7 ===
Erkan secured the gold medal while idle in the seventh and final round. The loser of the match between Reini and Karlsson was guaranteed the bronze. A Reini win by fall would have put Reini and Erkan even at 4 points, with Reini winning by virtue of the head-to-head tie-breaker from round 6. A Karlsson win would have set up a final match between Karlsson and Erkan, who had not yet faced each other. The actual result, however was a Reini win by decision—which eliminated both Reini and Karlsson with 5 points (Karlsson would have had 6 if the decision were unanimous rather than split, but Reini would take silver and Karlsson bronze either way). Erkan was thus left as the lone remaining contestant at 4 points and therefore the victor.

Bouts

Winner	Nation	Victory Type	Loser	Nation
Aarne Reini	Finland	Decision, 2–1	Einar Karlsson	Sweden
Yaşar Erkan	Turkey	Bye	N/A	N/A

Points

Rank	Wrestler	Nation	Start	Earned	Total
1st place, gold medalist(s)	Yaşar Erkan	Turkey	4	3	4
2nd place, silver medalist(s)	Aarne Reini	Finland	4	1	5
3rd place, bronze medalist(s)	Einar Karlsson	Sweden	3	2	5
