= Valdebenito =

Valdebenito is a surname. Notable people with the surname include:

- Hermogenes Valdebenito (1901–1979), Chilean fencer
- Kormac Valdebenito (born 1982), Chilean footballer
