= Schöpflin =

Schöpflin is a surname. Notable people with the surname include:

- Emil Schöpflin (1910–1999), German cyclist
- György Schöpflin (1939–2021), Hungarian academic and politician
- Johann Daniel Schöpflin (1694–1771), German historian
