= César Barros =

César Barros may refer to:

- César Barros (fencer) (1912–1992), Chilean fencer
- César Barros (motorcyclist) (born 1973), Brazilian motorcycle racer
