= Starzyński =

Starzyński ([ˌstarˈzɨɲski], feminine: Starzyńska, plural form: Starzyńscy [ˌstarˈzɨɲst͡sɨ]) is a Polish surname. Notable people with the surname include:

- Filip Starzyński (born 1991), Polish footballer
- Piotr Starzyński (born 2004), Polish footballer
- Stefan Starzyński (1893–1939), Polish statesman, economist and military officer
- Wacław Starzyński (1910–1976), Polish cyclist
- Zdzisław Starzyński (1932–2003), Polish field hockey player
