= Wiktor Olecki =

Polish cyclist

Personal information
- Born: 9 September 1909 Warsaw, Poland
- Died: 1981 (aged 71–72) Warsaw, Poland

Cycling career
- Sport: Cycling

Wiktor Olecki (9 September 1909 – 1981) was a Polish cyclist. He competed in the individual and team road race events at the 1936 Summer Olympics.
