= Ivan Valant =

Yugoslav cyclist

Personal information
- Born: 21 October 1909 Blejska Dobrava, Austria-Hungary
- Died: February 1999 (aged 89)

Cycling career
- Sport: Cycling

Ivan Valant (21 October 1909 – February 1999) was a Yugoslav cyclist. He competed in the individual and team road race events at the 1936 Summer Olympics.
