= Franc Gartner =

Yugoslav cyclist

Personal information
- Born: 19 September 1904 Ljubljana, Austria-Hungary
- Died: 26 July 1992 (aged 87)

Cycling career
- Sport: Cycling

Franc Gartner (19 September 1904 – 26 July 1992) was a Yugoslav cyclist, who rode for Hermes Ljubljana. He competed in the individual and team road race events at the 1936 Summer Olympics.
