= Mieczysław Kapiak =

Polish cyclist

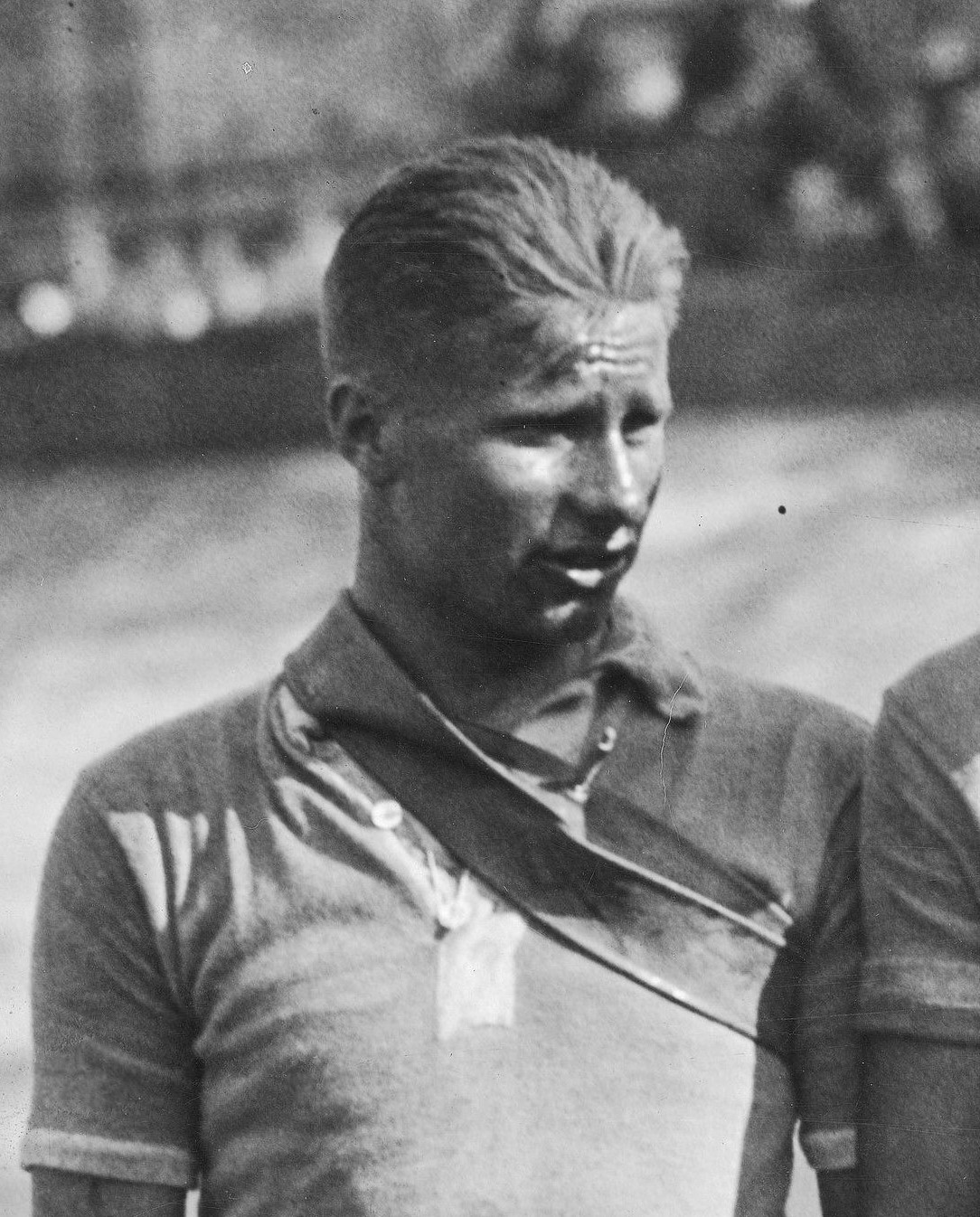

Personal information
- Born: 15 August 1911 Warsaw, Poland
- Died: 20 September 1975 (aged 64) Warsaw, Poland

Cycling career
- Sport: Cycling

Mieczysław Kapiak (15 August 1911 – 20 September 1975) was a Polish cyclist. He competed in the individual and team road race events at the 1936 Summer Olympics.
