= Arne Petersen =

Danish cyclist

Personal information
- Born: 2 April 1913 Vejen, Denmark
- Died: 28 December 1990 (aged 77) Falköping, Sweden

Cycling career
- Sport: Cycling

Arne Petersen (2 April 1913 – 28 December 1990) was a Danish cyclist. He competed in the individual and team road race events at the 1936 Summer Olympics.
