= Ernst Lehmann (wrestler) =

Swiss wrestler

Personal information
- Nationality: Swiss
- Born: 18 September 1910

Sport
- Sport: Wrestling

Ernst Lehmann (born 18 September 1910, date of death unknown) was a Swiss wrestler. He competed in the men's Greco-Roman featherweight at the 1936 Summer Olympics.
