= Paul Nixon (cyclist) =

American cyclist

Personal information
- Born: April 23, 1914 New York, New York, United States
- Died: January 18, 2008 (aged 93) Lakewood, New Jersey, United States

Cycling career
- Sport: Cycling

Paul Nixon (April 23, 1914 – January 18, 2008) was an American cyclist. He competed in the individual and team road race events at the 1936 Summer Olympics.
