= Henryk Szlązak =

Polish wrestler

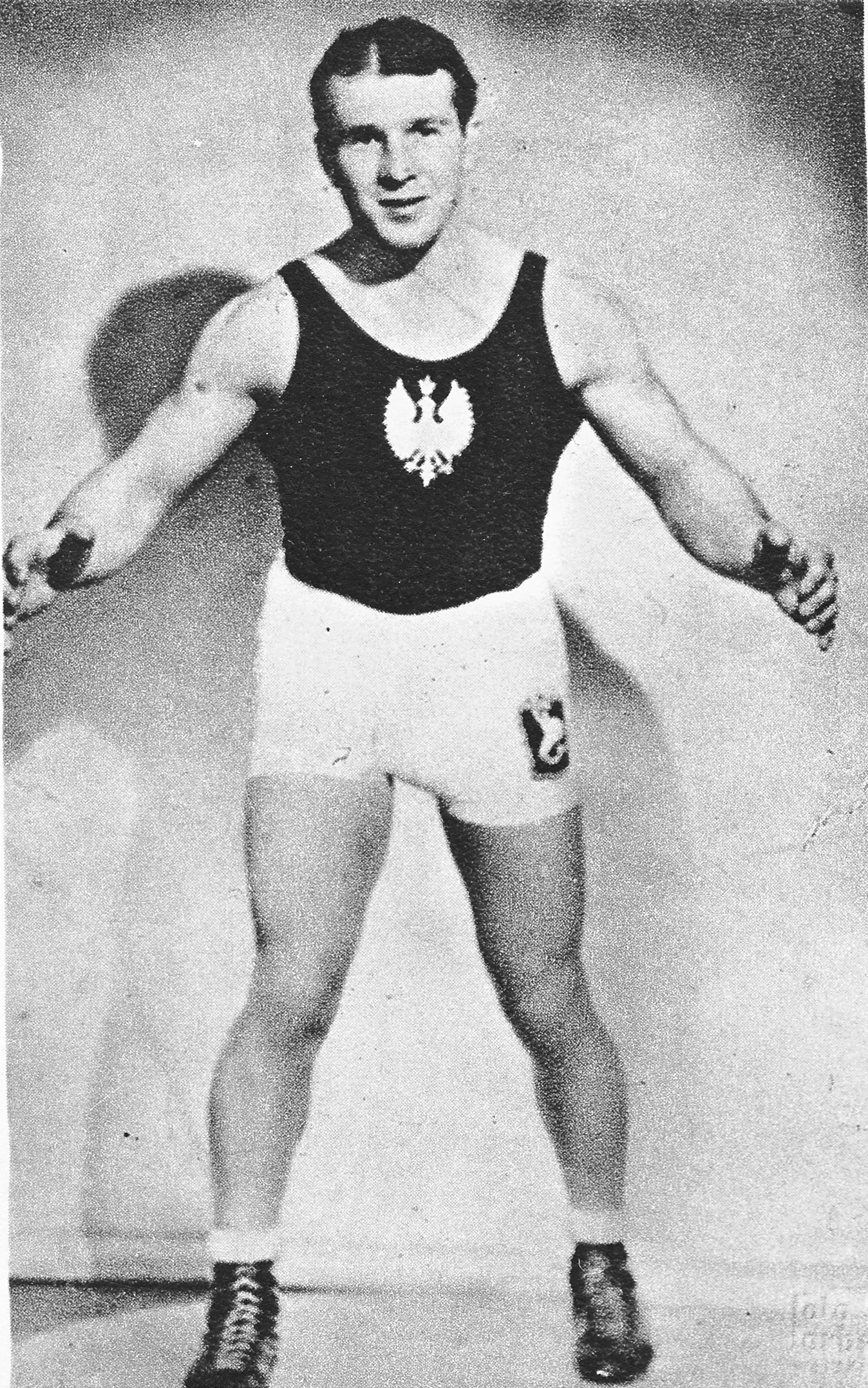
- Szlązak in the 1930s

Personal information
- Nationality: Polish
- Born: 3 March 1913 Warsaw, Russian Empire
- Died: 30 September 1944 (aged 31) Warsaw, German-occupied Poland

Sport
- Sport: Wrestling

Henryk Szlązak (3 March 1913 – 30 September 1944) was a Polish wrestler. He competed in the men's Greco-Roman featherweight at the 1936 Summer Olympics. He was killed in the Warsaw Uprising during World War II.
