= Ernst Nievergelt =

Swiss racing cyclist

Personal information
- Born: 23 March 1910 Zurich, Switzerland
- Died: 1 July 1999 (aged 89) Zürich, Switzerland

Cycling career
- Sport: Cycling
Medal record
Representing SUI
Men's cycling
Olympic Games
Silver medal – second place	1936 Berlin	Team road race
Bronze medal – third place	1936 Berlin	Individual road race

Ernst Nievergelt (23 March 1910 – 1 July 1999) was a cyclist from Switzerland. He was born in Affoltern, Zurich, Switzerland, and died in Kappel am Albis.

In 1935 Nievergelt won the amateur standings in the Championship of Zurich.

He competed for Switzerland in the 1936 Summer Olympics held in Berlin, Germany in the individual road race event where he finished in third place. He also teamed up with fellow countrymen Edgar Buchwalder and Kurt Ott to win the silver medal in the team road race, which ran over 100 kilometers on the AVUS-Nordschleife.

From 1937 to 1939 he competed in professional racing. In 1937 he took second place at Berlin. His only win as a professional was in 1938, when he won the ninth stage of the International Tour of Germany. At the Tour de Suisse, he finished on the sixth stage in second place in the standings and 19th place overall.
