= Hermógenes Netto =

Brazilian cyclist

Personal information
- Born: 14 August 1913 Santos Dumont, Minas Gerais, Brazil
- Died: 28 July 1989 (aged 75) Belo Horizonte, Minas Gerais, Brazil

Cycling career
- Sport: Cycling

Hermógenes Netto (14 August 1913 – 28 July 1989) was a Brazilian cyclist. He competed in the individual road race event at the 1936 Summer Olympics.
