= Eugen Schnalek =

Austrian cyclist

Personal information
- Born: 17 March 1911
- Died: 1944/1945

Cycling career
- Sport: Cycling

Eugen Schnalek (17 March 1911 – 1944/1945) was an Austrian cyclist. He competed in the individual and team road race events at the 1936 Summer Olympics. He was killed during World War II.
