= Dertônio Ferrer =

Brazilian cyclist

Personal information
- Born: 6 February 1913
- Died: 23 January 1948 (aged 34)

Cycling career
- Sport: Cycling

Dertônio Ferrer (6 February 1913 – 23 January 1948) was a Brazilian cyclist. He competed in the individual road race event at the 1936 Summer Olympics.
