= Josef Lošek =

Czech cyclist

Personal information
- Born: 14 March 1912
- Died: 29 May 1991 (aged 79) Prague

Cycling career
- Sport: Cycling

Josef Lošek (14 March 1912 – 29 May 1991) was a Czech cyclist. He competed in the individual and team road race events at the 1936 Summer Olympics.
