= Berndt Carlsson =

Swedish cyclist

Personal information
- Born: 7 April 1907 Ödeshög, Sweden
- Died: 30 June 1991 (aged 84) Stockholm, Sweden

Cycling career
- Sport: Cycling

Berndt Carlsson (7 April 1907 – 30 June 1991) was a Swedish cyclist. He competed in the individual and team road race events at the 1936 Summer Olympics.
