= Knud Jacobsen =

Danish cyclist

Personal information
- Born: 26 May 1914 Copenhagen, Denmark
- Died: 29 December 1987 (aged 73) Malta

Cycling career
- Sport: Cycling

Knud Jacobsen (26 May 1914 – 29 December 1987) was a Danish cyclist. He competed in the individual and team road race events at the 1936 Summer Olympics.
