= Hideichi Yoshioka =

Japanese wrestler (born 1914)

Personal information
- Nationality: Japanese
- Born: 10 September 1914

Sport
- Sport: Wrestling

Hideichi Yoshioka (born 10 September 1914, date of death unknown) was a Japanese wrestler. He competed in the men's Greco-Roman featherweight at the 1936 Summer Olympics.
