= František Janda (wrestler) =

Czech wrestler

Personal information
- Nationality: Czech
- Born: 9 January 1910
- Died: 24 October 1986 (aged 76)

Sport
- Sport: Wrestling

František Janda (9 January 1910 – 24 October 1986) was a Czech wrestler. He competed in the men's Greco-Roman featherweight at the 1936 Summer Olympics.
