= Károly Nemes-Nótás =

Hungarian cyclist

Personal information
- Born: 28 October 1911 Budapest, Austria-Hungary
- Died: 4 August 1982 (aged 70) Budapest, Hungary

Cycling career
- Sport: Cycling

Károly Nemes-Nótás (28 October 1911 – 4 August 1982) was a Hungarian cyclist. He competed in the individual and team road race events at the 1936 Summer Olympics.
