= Elio Bavutti =

Italian cyclist

Personal information
- Born: 5 May 1914 Modena, Italy
- Died: 9 February 1987 (aged 72) Modena, Italy

Cycling career
- Sport: Cycling

Elio Bavutti (5 May 1914 – 9 February 1987) was an Italian cyclist. He competed in the individual and team road race events at the 1936 Summer Olympics.
