= Rudy Houtsch =

Luxembourgish cyclist

Personal information
- Full name: Rudolf Houtsch
- Born: 8 January 1916
- Died: 20 December 2003 (aged 87)

Cycling career
- Sport: Cycling

Rudolf Houtsch (8 January 1916 – 20 December 2003) was a Luxembourgish cyclist. He competed in the individual and team road race events at the 1936 Summer Olympics.
