= Tauno Lindgren =

Finnish cyclist

Personal information
- Born: 4 December 1911 Kemi, Finland
- Died: 25 June 1991 (aged 79) Espoo, Finland

Cycling career
- Sport: Cycling

Tauno Lindgren (4 December 1911 – 25 June 1991) was a Finnish cyclist. He competed in the individual road race event at the 1936 Summer Olympics.
