= Bill Messer =

British cyclist

Personal information
- Born: 8 July 1915 Willesden, London, England

Cycling career
- Sport: Cycling

Bill Messer (born 8 July 1915, date of death unknown) was a British cyclist. He competed in the individual and team road race events at the 1936 Summer Olympics.
