= Erich Fincsusz =

Austrian wrestler

Personal information
- Nationality: Austrian
- Born: 22 December 1912
- Died: November 1976 (aged 63)

Sport
- Sport: Wrestling

Erich Fincsusz (22 December 1912 – November 1976) was an Austrian wrestler. He competed in the men's Greco-Roman featherweight at the 1936 Summer Olympics.
