= Hans Höfner =

Austrian cyclist

Personal information
- Born: 20 December 1912
- Died: 16 September 1988 (aged 75)

Cycling career
- Sport: Cycling

Hans Höfner (20 December 1912 – 16 September 1988) was an Austrian cyclist. He competed in the individual and team road race events at the 1936 Summer Olympics.
