= Jacques Majerus =

Luxembourgish cyclist

Personal information
- Born: 28 March 1916 Wiltz, Luxembourg
- Died: 18 January 1972 (aged 55) Arosa, Switzerland

Cycling career
- Sport: Cycling

Jacques Majerus (28 March 1916 – 18 January 1972) was a Luxembourgish cyclist. He competed in the individual and team road race events at the 1936 Summer Olympics. He was the brother of racing cyclist Jean Majerus.
