= Doug Peace =

Canadian cyclist

Personal information
- Born: April 4, 1919
- Died: December 12, 2000 (aged 81) Ottawa, Ontario, Canada

Cycling career
- Sport: Cycling

Douglas C. Peace (April 4, 1919 – December 12, 2000) was a Canadian cyclist who competed at the 1936 Summer Olympics. In Berlin he competed in the men's sprint event, but was eliminated in the second round against eventual bronze medalist Louis Chaillot. He competed out of the Maple Leaf Wheelmen Club of Toronto and was a four-time national cycling champion.
