= Hans Leutelt =

Czech cyclist

Personal information
- Born: 1 October 1914
- Died: 20 December 1936 (aged 22)

Cycling career
- Sport: Cycling

Hans Leutelt (1 October 1914 – 20 December 1936) was a Czech cyclist. He competed in the individual and team road race events at the 1936 Summer Olympics.
