= Willi Meurer =

German cyclist

Personal information
- Born: 10 September 1915 Cologne, German Empire
- Died: 28 September 1981 (aged 66) Dahlem, West Germany

Cycling career
- Sport: Cycling

Willi Meurer (10 September 1915 – 28 September 1981) was a German cyclist. He competed in the individual and team road race events at the 1936 Summer Olympics.
