= Corrado Ardizzoni =

Italian cyclist

Personal information
- Born: 23 February 1916 Cento, Italy
- Died: 14 March 1980 (aged 64) Cento, Italy

Cycling career
- Sport: Cycling

Corrado Ardizzoni (23 February 1916 – 14 March 1980) was an Italian cyclist. He competed in the individual and team road race events at the 1936 Summer Olympics.
