= Gottlieb Weber =

Swiss cyclist

Personal information
- Born: 26 July 1910 Zurich, Switzerland
- Died: 4 November 1996 (aged 86) Zürich, Switzerland

Cycling career
- Sport: Cycling

Gottlieb Weber (26 July 1910 – 4 November 1996) was a Swiss cyclist. He competed in the individual and team road race events at the 1936 Summer Olympics.
