= Gyula Móri =

Hungarian wrestler

Personal information
- Nationality: Hungarian
- Born: 6 March 1914
- Died: 2 October 1972 (aged 58)

Sport
- Sport: Wrestling

Gyula Móri (6 March 1914 – 2 October 1972) was a Hungarian wrestler. He competed in the men's Greco-Roman featherweight at the 1936 Summer Olympics.
