= Toni Merkens =

German cyclist (1912–1944)

- Toni Merkens

Personal information
- Full name: Nikolaus Anton Merkens
- Nickname: Toni
- Born: 21 June 1912 Cologne, German Empire
- Died: 20 June 1944 (aged 31) Wildbad, Nazi Germany

Cycling career
- Sport: Cycling
- Discipline: Track
- Role: Rider
- Rider type: Sprint, stayers
Medal record
Men's track cycling
Representing Germany
Olympic Games
Gold medal – first place	1936 Berlin	Sprint

Nikolaus Anton "Toni" Merkens (21 June 1912 – 20 June 1944) was a racing cyclist from Germany and Olympic champion. He represented his native country at the 1936 Summer Olympics in Berlin, where he won the gold medal in the men's 1000 meter match sprint event.

== Racing career ==
Merkens trained as a bicycle mechanic with Fritz Köthke. In 1933 he won his first German championship in sprint. In 1934, he was able to repeat this success and also won the British Open Championships and the Grand Prix de Paris. At the World Championships he finished fourth. In 1935 he again won the championships in Germany and the UK and the Paris Grand Prix. At the World Championships in Brussels, he also won the title in the final against Dutch cyclist Arie van Vliet 2–1.

During the first race of the 1936 Olympic final, Merkens clearly interfered with Arie van Vliet, but no foul was called by the officials. Van Vliet also lost the second race of the final and received the silver medal. After a protest by the Dutch team, Merkens, rather than being disqualified, was fined 100 marks.

Merkens turned professional immediately after the 1936 Olympics. In 1937 and 1939, he was German Vice Champion in the sprint. In 1940 he was the German champion in stayers, and was Vice Champion in 1941. In 1942 he won the German professional championship in the sprint and was Vice Champion again in the stayers.

== World War II ==
Merkens was drafted into the army in 1942. Merkens was killed in World War II fighting the Soviets on the Eastern Front. He was struck between the heart and lungs by a shell splinter, and died in a hospital in Wildbad after becoming ill with meningitis.

== Commemoration ==
In the Munich Olympiapark, the road between the main stadium and the velodrome is called Toni-Merkens-Weg (Toni Merkens Way). A memorial stone was erected in 1948 at the velodrome in Cologne.

== Literature ==
- Volker Kluge (1997). Olympische Sommerspiele. Die Chronik I, Berlin. ISBN 3-328-00715-6
- Pascal Sergent, Guy Crasset, Hervé Dauchy (2000). Mondial Encyclopedie Cyclisme. Volume 3 G-P, UCI. ISBN 90-74128-73-4
