= Miloslav Loos =

Czech cyclist

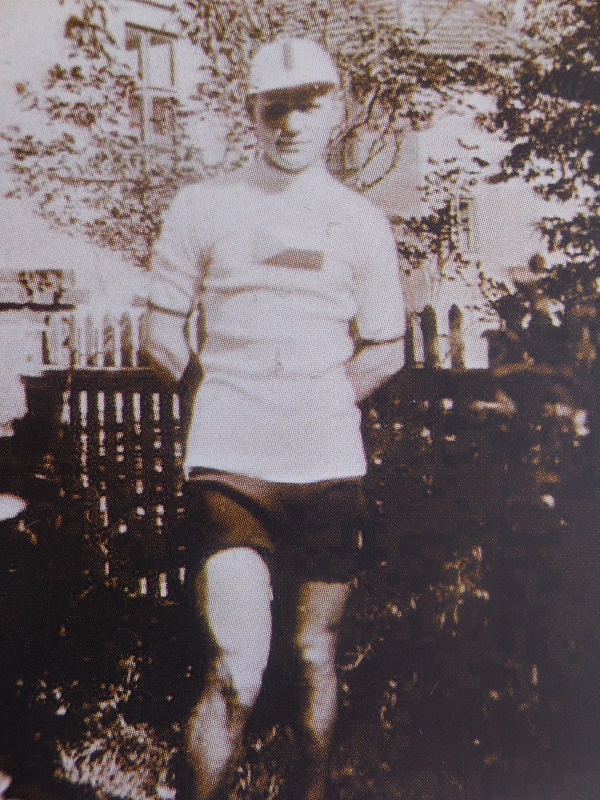

Personal information
- Born: 20 January 1914 Prague, Austria-Hungary
- Died: 2 March 2010 (aged 96)

Cycling career
- Sport: Cycling

Miloslav Loos (20 January 1914 – 2 March 2010) was a Czech cyclist. He competed in the individual and team road race events at the 1936 Summer Olympics. Before his death, he became the oldest living Czech Olympic competitor.
