= Benedetto Pola =

Italian cyclist

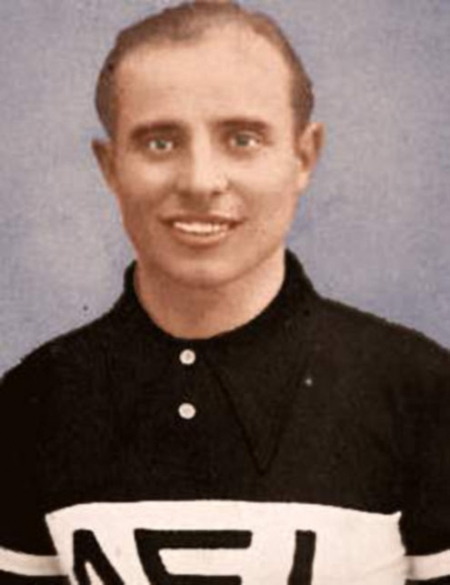

Personal information
- Born: 17 April 1915 Borgosatollo, Italy
- Died: 1 August 2000 (aged 85) Borgosatollo, Italy

Cycling career
- Sport: Cycling

Benedetto Pola (17 April 1915 – 1 August 2000) was an Italian cyclist. He competed in the sprint and the time trial events at the 1936 Summer Olympics.
