= Chris Wheeler (cyclist) =

Australian cyclist

Personal information
- Born: 26 July 1914 Woodend, Victoria, Australia
- Died: 13 November 1984 (aged 70) Oak Park, Victoria, Australia

Cycling career
- Sport: Cycling

Chris Wheeler (26 July 1914 – 13 November 1984) was an Australian cyclist. He competed in the individual road race event at the 1936 Summer Olympics.
