= István Adorján =

Hungarian cyclist (1913–1987)

Personal information
- Born: 12 November 1913 Székesfehérvár, Hungary
- Died: 7 June 1987 (aged 73) Mayfield Heights, Ohio, United States

Cycling career
- Sport: Cycling

István Adorján (12 November 1913 – 7 June 1987) was a Hungarian cyclist. He competed in the individual and team road race events at the 1936 Summer Olympics.
