= Philippus Vethaak =

Dutch cyclist

Personal information
- Born: 1 October 1914 Vlaardingen, Netherlands
- Died: 23 September 1991 (aged 76) Vlaardingen, Netherlands

Cycling career
- Sport: Cycling

Philippus Vethaak (1 October 1914 – 23 September 1991) was a Dutch cyclist. He competed in the individual and team road race events at the 1936 Summer Olympics.

== See also ==
- List of Dutch Olympic cyclists
