= Tage Møller =

Danish cyclist

Personal information
- Born: 14 March 1914 Copenhagen, Denmark
- Died: 14 February 2006 (aged 91) Glostrup, Denmark

Cycling career
- Sport: Cycling

Tage Møller (14 March 1914 – 14 February 2006) was a Danish cyclist. He competed in the individual and team road race events at the 1936 Summer Olympics.
