= Alick Bevan =

British cyclist

Personal information
- Born: 27 March 1915 Wandsworth, London, England
- Died: 24 January 1945 (aged 29) Nordrhein-Westfalen, Nazi Germany

Cycling career
- Sport: Cycling

Alick Bevan (27 March 1915 – 24 January 1945) was a British cyclist. He competed in the individual and team road race events at the 1936 Summer Olympics.

He was son of Percy and Rose Anne Bevan of Battersea, London.

He was killed in action during World War II while serving in the Western Allied invasion of Germany. He was serving as a lieutenant in the East Surrey Regiment who was attached to the 7th Battalion of the Hampshire Regiment when he was mortally wounded by a landmine while participating in an operation around the towns of Pütt and Walderath in Heinsberg, western Nazi Germany. He was buried in Brunssum War Cemetery in the Netherlands.
