= Ingvar Ericsson (cyclist) =

Swedish cyclist

Personal information
- Born: 5 January 1914 Uppsala, Sweden
- Died: 21 April 1995 (aged 81) Stockholm, Sweden

Cycling career
- Sport: Cycling

Ingvar Ericsson (5 January 1914 – 21 April 1995) was a Swedish cyclist. He competed in the individual and team road race events at the 1936 Summer Olympics.
