= Fritz Scheller =

German cyclist

Personal information
- Born: 22 September 1914 Erlangen, Germany
- Died: 22 July 1997 (aged 82) Roßtal, Germany

Cycling career
- Sport: Cycling

Fritz Scheller (22 September 1914 – 22 July 1997) was a German cyclist. He competed in the individual and team road race events at the 1936 Summer Olympics.
