= Sebastian Hering =

German wrestler

Personal information
- Nationality: German
- Born: 21 August 1910 Munich, Germany
- Died: 28 February 1978 (aged 67) Munich, Germany

Sport
- Sport: Wrestling

Sebastian Hering (21 August 1910 – 28 February 1978) was a German wrestler. He competed in the men's Greco-Roman featherweight at the 1936 Summer Olympics.
