= Tomo Šestak =

Croatian wrestler

Personal information
- Nationality: Croatian
- Born: 20 December 1914 Koprivnica, Austria-Hungary
- Died: 1 March 1984 (aged 69) Zagreb, Yugoslavia

Sport
- Sport: Wrestling

Tomo Šestak (20 December 1914 – 1 March 1984) was a Croatian wrestler. He competed in the men's Greco-Roman featherweight at the 1936 Summer Olympics.
