= Fritz Ruland =

German cyclist

Personal information
- Born: 11 January 1914 Cologne, Germany
- Died: 7 January 1999 (aged 84)

Cycling career
- Sport: Cycling

Fritz Ruland (11 January 1914 – 7 January 1999) was a German cyclist. He competed in the individual and team road race events at the 1936 Summer Olympics.
