= René van Hove =

Dutch cyclist

Personal information
- Born: 11 April 1913 Koewacht, Netherlands

Cycling career
- Sport: Cycling

René van Hove (11 April 1913 – 19 August 1997) was a Dutch cyclist. He competed in the individual and team road race events at the 1936 Summer Olympics.

== See also ==
- List of Dutch Olympic cyclists
