= Werner Wägelin =

Swiss cyclist

Personal information
- Born: 7 August 1913 Zürich, Switzerland
- Died: 28 February 1991 (aged 77) Zürich, Switzerland

Cycling career
- Sport: Cycling

Werner Wägelin (7 August 1913 – 28 February 1991) was a Swiss cyclist. He competed in the sprint and the team pursuit events at the 1936 Summer Olympics.
