= Nico van Gageldonk =

Dutch cyclist

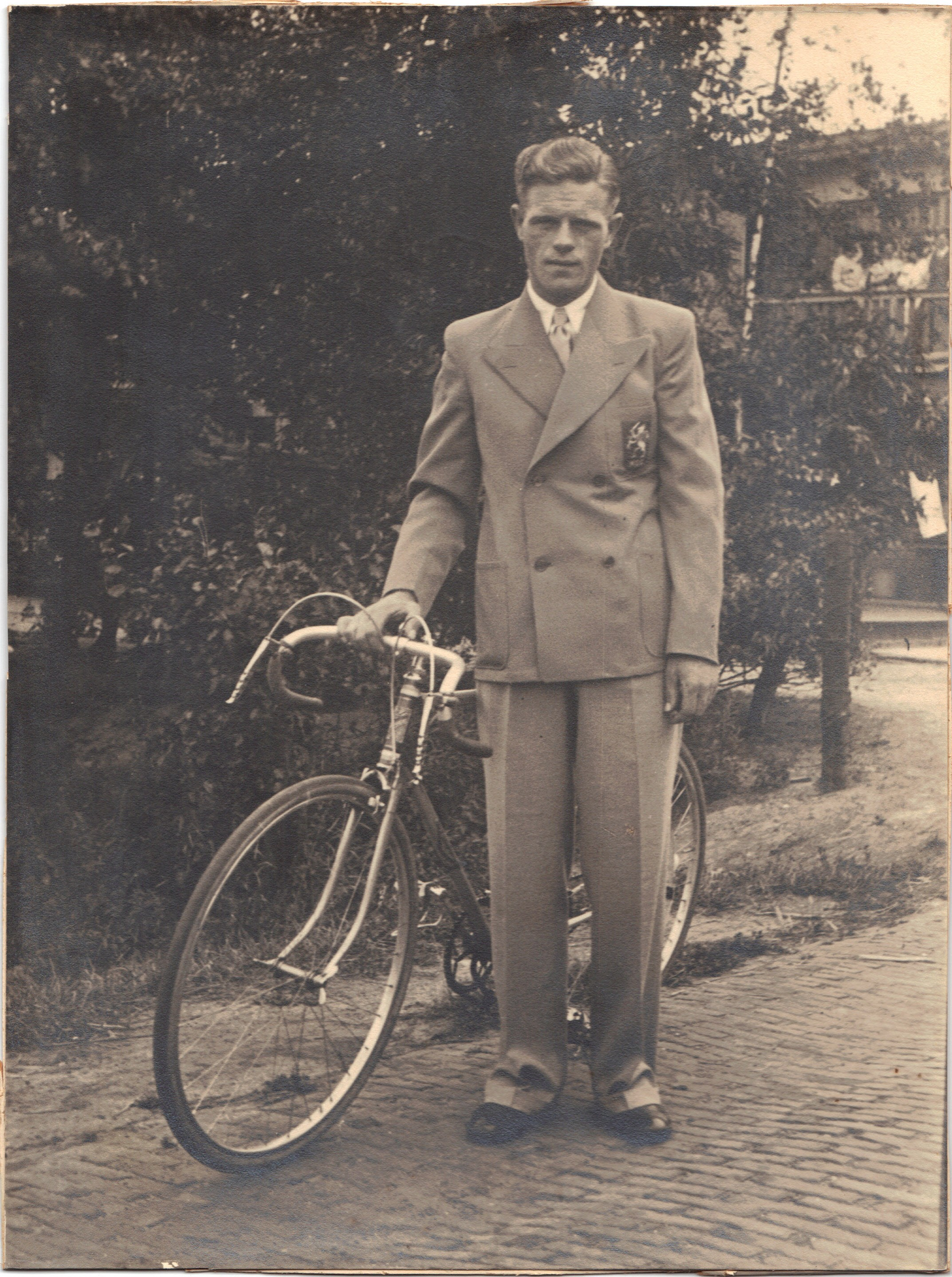
- Nico van Gageldonk in 1936

Personal information
- Born: 26 May 1913 Klundert, Netherlands
- Died: 19 May 1995 (aged 81) Breda, Netherlands

Cycling career
- Sport: Cycling

Nico van Gageldonk (26 May 1913 – 19 May 1995) was a Dutch cyclist. He competed in the individual and team road race events at the 1936 Summer Olympics.

== See also ==
- List of Dutch Olympic cyclists
