= Haakon Sandtorp =

Norwegian cyclist

Personal information
- Born: 22 August 1911 Kristiania, Norway
- Died: 9 August 1974 (aged 62) Oslo, Norway

Cycling career
- Sport: Cycling

Haakon Sandtorp (22 August 1911 – 9 August 1974) was a Norwegian cyclist who competed in both track and road races. He competed at the 1936 Summer Olympics.

He grew up in the street Torggata in central Oslo, named Kristiania at the time of his birth. Sandtorp's cycling career coincided with Oslo getting a velodrome at Dælenenga idrettspark, with himself, Bernt Evensen and Arnfinn Mortensen competing on the international stage, before the velodrome eventually was demolished. He also raced at the Ordrup velodrome in Denmark.

Sandtorp was an eight-time national champion in track cycling, and at the Nordic Championships he won two silver medals and two bronze medals. He competed at three World Championships. At the 1936 Summer Olympics he competed in the sprint event, winning one head-to-head and losing two.

Sandtorp represented the sports club IK Hero, and was proclaimed lifetime member of that club. He was a vice president of the Norwegian Cycling Federation for two years, and president from 1950 to 1952. He thus led the Norwegian cycling squad at the 1952 Summer Olympics. Outside of sport administration, he held a job in sport retail. Sandtorp died at age 62.
