= Josip Pokupec =

Yugoslav cyclist

Personal information
- Born: 20 August 1913
- Died: 2 April 1999 (aged 85)

Cycling career
- Sport: Cycling

Josip Pokupec (20 August 1913 – 2 April 1999) was a Yugoslav cyclist. He competed in the individual and team road race events at the 1936 Summer Olympics.
