= Virgilius Altmann =

Austrian cyclist

Personal information
- Born: 9 February 1913 Vienna, Austria-Hungary
- Died: 17 October 1943 (aged 30) Homel, Belarus, Reichskommissariat Ostland

Cycling career
- Sport: Cycling

Virgilius Altmann (9 February 1913 – 17 October 1943) was an Austrian cyclist. He competed in the individual and team road race events at the 1936 Summer Olympics. He was killed in action during World War II.
