= Karl Kühn =

Austrian cyclist

Personal information
- Born: 9 March 1904
- Died: 24 July 1986 (aged 82)

Cycling career
- Sport: Cycling

Karl Kühn (9 March 1904 – 24 July 1986) was an Austrian cyclist. He competed in the individual and team road race events at the 1936 Summer Olympics.
