= Stanisław Zieliński =

Polish cyclist (1912–1939)

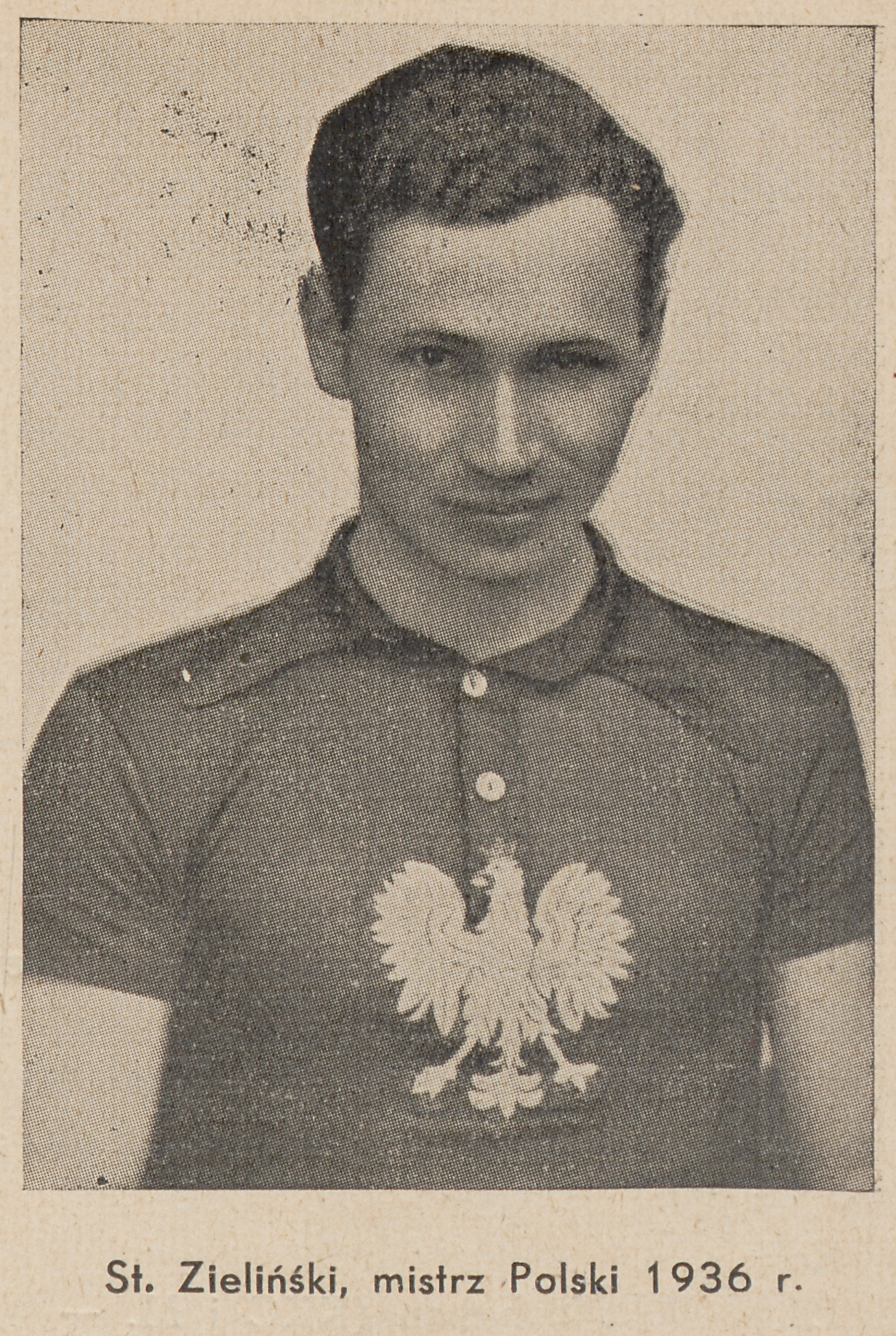

Personal information
- Born: 26 July 1912 Warsaw, Russian Empire
- Died: September 1939 (aged 27) (presumed) Poland

Cycling career
- Sport: Cycling

Stanisław Zieliński (26 July 1912 – September 1939) was a Polish cyclist. He competed in the individual and team road race events at the 1936 Summer Olympics. He disappeared while attempting to flee Warsaw during the Invasion of Poland.

== See also ==
- List of people who disappeared
