= Rusty Peden =

Canadian cyclist

Personal information
- Born: 6 January 1916 Victoria, British Columbia, Canada
- Died: 23 June 1995 (aged 79) Victoria, British Columbia, Canada

Cycling career
- Sport: Cycling

Rusty Peden (6 January 1916 – 23 June 1995) was a Canadian cyclist. He competed in the individual and team road race events at the 1936 Summer Olympics.
