= Eugène Kracher =

French wrestler

Personal information
- Nationality: French
- Born: 20 August 1909 Sélestat, France
- Died: 7 February 1995 (aged 85) Sélestat, France

Sport
- Sport: Wrestling

Eugène Kracher (20 August 1909 – 7 February 1995) was a French wrestler. He competed in the men's Greco-Roman featherweight at the 1936 Summer Olympics.
