= János Bognár =

Hungarian cyclist

Personal information
- Born: 24 April 1914 Budapest, Austria-Hungary
- Died: 8 March 2004 (aged 89) San Diego, California, United States

Cycling career
- Sport: Cycling

János Bognár (24 April 1914 – 8 March 2004) was a Hungarian cyclist. He competed in the individual and team road race events at the 1936 Summer Olympics.
