= Henri Collard =

Belgian cyclist

Personal information
- Born: 23 January 1912 Liège, Belgium
- Died: 23 February 1988 (aged 76) Liège, Belgium

Cycling career
- Sport: Cycling

Henri Collard (23 January 1912 – 23 February 1988) was a Belgian cyclist. He competed in the sprint event at the 1936 Summer Olympics.
