= Ion Horvath =

Romanian wrestler

Personal information
- Nationality: Romanian
- Born: 12 August 1912 Lugoj, Austria-Hungary

Sport
- Sport: Wrestling

Ion Horvath (12 August 1912 - October 1980) was a Romanian wrestler. He competed in the men's Greco-Roman featherweight at the 1936 Summer Olympics.
