= Paul Frantz (cyclist) =

Luxembourgish cyclist

Personal information
- Born: 4 July 1915 Mamer, Luxembourg
- Died: 12 November 1995 (aged 80) Mamer, Luxembourg

Cycling career
- Sport: Cycling

Paul Frantz (4 July 1915 – 12 November 1995) was a Luxembourgish cyclist. He competed in the individual and team road race events at the 1936 Summer Olympics.
