= August Scherpenisse =

Belgian wrestler

Personal information
- Nationality: Belgian
- Born: 6 January 1912 Antwerp, Belgium
- Died: 1988 (aged 75–76) Antwerp, Belgium

Sport
- Sport: Wrestling

August Scherpenisse (6 January 1912 – 1988) was a Belgian wrestler. He competed in the men's Greco-Roman featherweight at the 1936 Summer Olympics.
