= César Peñaranda =

Peruvian cyclist

Personal information
- Born: 14 May 1915 Lima, Peru
- Died: 22 March 2007 (aged 91)

Cycling career
- Sport: Cycling

César Augusto Peñaranda Murguira (14 May 1915 – 22 March 2007) was a Peruvian cyclist. He competed in the individual and team road race events at the 1936 Summer Olympics.
