= Aleksandar Nikolov (cyclist) =

Bulgarian cyclist

Personal information
- Born: 12 August 1912
- Died: 1991 (aged 78–79)

Cycling career
- Sport: Cycling

Aleksandar Nikolov (Bulgarian: Александър Николов, 12 August 1912 – 1991) was a Bulgarian cyclist. He competed in the individual and team road race events at the 1936 Summer Olympics.
