= Rafael Montero (cyclist) =

Chilean cyclist (1913-1962)

Personal information
- Born: 12 July 1913
- Died: 1962 (aged 48–49)

Cycling career
- Sport: Cycling

Rafael Montero (12 July 1913 – 1962) was a Chilean cyclist. He competed in the individual and team road race events at the 1936 Summer Olympics.
