= Wacław Starzyński =

Polish cyclist

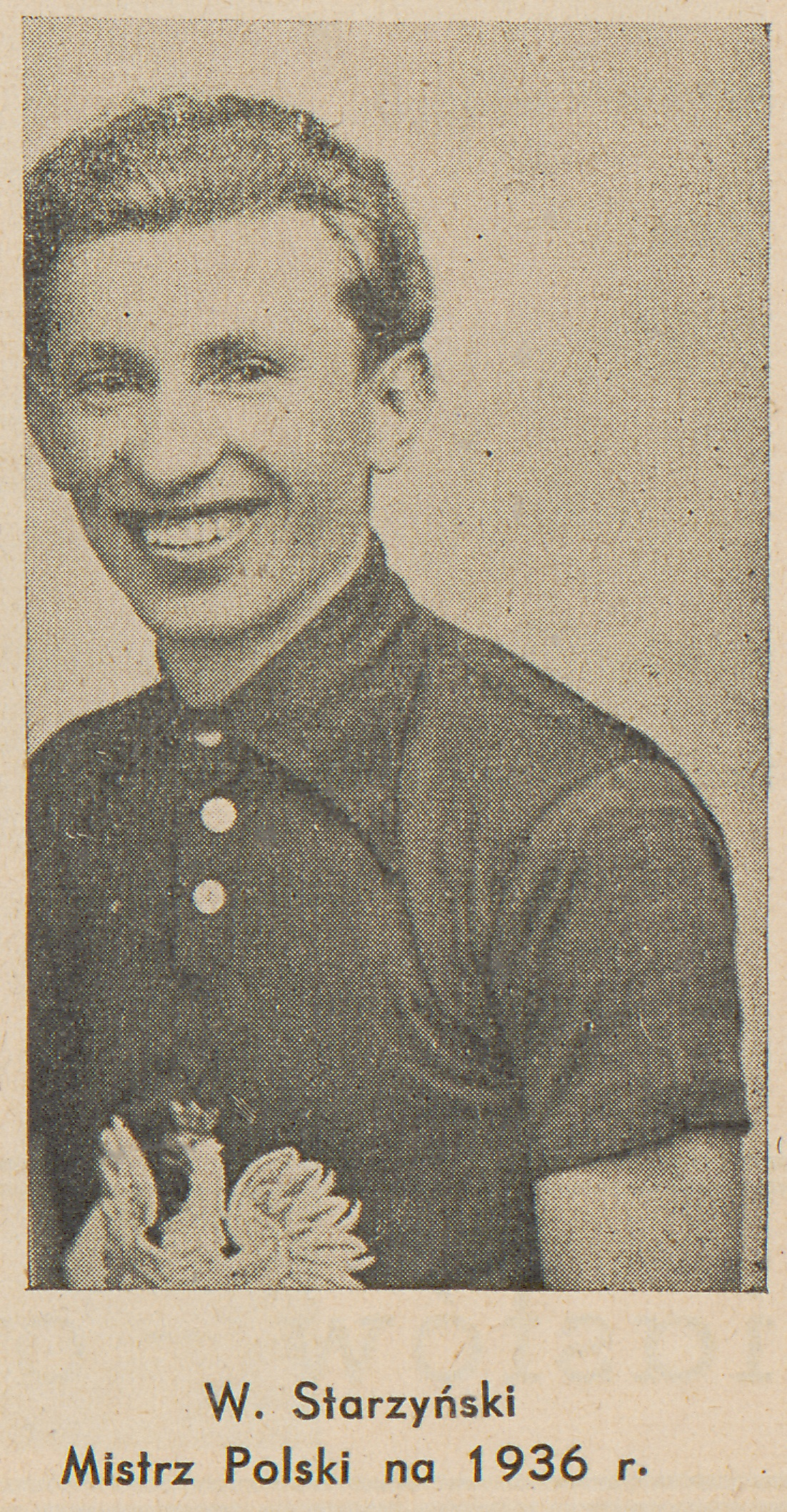

Personal information
- Born: 8 October 1910 Pułtusk, Poland
- Died: 20 August 1976 (aged 65) Warsaw, Poland

Cycling career
- Sport: Cycling
- Discipline: road race

Wacław Starzyński (8 October 1910 – 20 August 1976) was a Polish cyclist. He competed in the individual and team road race events at the 1936 Summer Olympics.
