= Nedyu Rachev =

Bulgarian cyclist

Personal information
- Born: 4 October 1915
- Died: 1958 (aged 42–43)

Cycling career
- Sport: Cycling

Nedyu Rachev (Bulgarian: Недю Рачев, 4 October 1915 – 1958) was a Bulgarian cyclist. He competed in the sprint event at the 1936 Summer Olympics.
