= Jorge Guerra (cyclist) =

Chilean cyclist

Personal information
- Born: 27 October 1913
- Died: 28 July 2003 (aged 89)

Cycling career
- Sport: Cycling

Jorge Guerra (27 October 1913 – 28 July 2003) was a Chilean cyclist who competed in the individual and team road race events at the 1936 Summer Olympics.
