= Einar Karlsson =

Swedish wrestler (1908–1980)

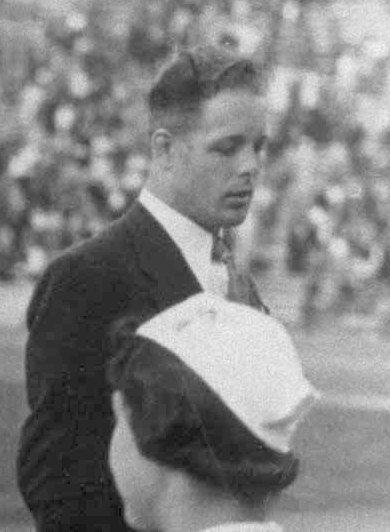
- Karlsson at the 1936 Olympics

Personal information
- Born: 1 September 1908 Stockholm, Sweden
- Died: 17 February 1980 (aged 71) Stockholm, Sweden

Sport
- Sport: Wrestling
- Club: Djurgårdens IF, Stockholm
Medal record
Men's wrestling
Representing Sweden
Olympic Games
Bronze medal – third place	1932 Los Angeles	Freestyle, 61 kg
Bronze medal – third place	1936 Berlin	Greco-Roman, 61 kg
European Championships
Silver medal – second place	1933 Helsinki	Greco-Roman, 66 kg
Bronze medal – third place	1934 Rome	Greco-Roman, 66 kg
Bronze medal – third place	1937 Paris	Greco-Roman, 61 kg

Einar Karlsson (1 September 1908 – 17 February 1980) was a Swedish wrestler. He competed at the 1932 and 1936 Summer Olympics and won two bronze medals: in the freestyle featherweight in 1932 and in the Greco-Roman featherweight in 1936. He also won seven national titles and three medals at the European Championships of 1933–1937, all in Greco-Roman events.

Karlsson represented Djurgårdens IF.
