= Aarne Reini =

Finnish wrestler (1906–1974)

Medal record

Men's Greco-Roman wrestling

Representing Finland

Olympic Games
Silver medal – second place	1936 Berlin	Featherweight

Aarne Reini (August 6, 1906 – February 23, 1974) was a Finnish wrestler and Olympic medalist in Greco-Roman wrestling.

== Olympics ==
Reini competed at the 1936 Summer Olympics in Berlin where he received a silver medal in Greco-Roman wrestling, the featherweight class. He also competed at the 1932 Summer Olympics.
