= Cihat Teğin =

Turkish fencer

Personal information
- Born: 16 November 1915

Sport
- Sport: Fencing

Cihat Teğin (born 16 November 1915, date of death unknown) was a Turkish fencer. He competed in the individual and team sabre events at the 1936 Summer Olympics.
