= Tennis Stadium (Berlin) =

Stadium in Berlin, Germany

Coordinates: 52°31′2″N 13°14′58″E

The Tennis Stadium is a stadium in the Olympiapark Berlin in Berlin, Germany. Located southwest of the Olympic Stadium in Olympiapark Berlin, it hosted the basketball competition for the 1936 Summer Olympics.
