= Valentino Borgia =

Italian wrestler

Personal information
- Nationality: Italian
- Born: 8 November 1914 Bologna, Italy
- Died: 29 August 2004 (aged 89)

Sport
- Sport: Wrestling

Valentino Borgia (8 November 1914 – 29 August 2004) was an Italian wrestler. He competed in the men's Greco-Roman featherweight at the 1936 Summer Olympics.
