= Karl Magnussen =

Danish cyclist (1915–1966)

Personal information
- Born: 21 April 1915 Hovedstaden, Denmark
- Died: 10 April 1966 (aged 50) Hovedstaden, Denmark

Cycling career
- Sport: Cycling

Karl Magnussen (21 April 1915 – 10 April 1966) was a Danish cyclist. He competed in the sprint and the team pursuit events at the 1936 Summer Olympics.
