= Gregorio Caloggero =

Peruvian cyclist

Personal information
- Born: 27 May 1917
- Died: September 1995

Cycling career
- Sport: Cycling

Gregorio Caloggero (27 May 1917 – September 1995) was a Peruvian cyclist. He competed in the individual and team road race events at the 1936 Summer Olympics.
