= Krisjānis Kundziņš =

Latvian wrestler (1905–1993)

Personal information
- Nationality: Latvian
- Born: 19 March 1905
- Died: 23 February 1993 (aged 87) Riga, Latvia

Sport
- Sport: Wrestling

Krisjānis Kundziņš (19 March 1905 – 23 February 1993) was a Latvian wrestler. He competed in the men's Greco-Roman featherweight at the 1936 Summer Olympics.
