= Ricardo Romero (fencer) =

Chilean fencer

Personal information
- Born: 1 November 1898
- Died: 23 August 1992 (aged 93)

Sport
- Sport: Fencing

Ricardo Romero (1 November 1898 – 23 August 1992) was a Chilean fencer. He competed in the individual and team épée and team sabre events at the 1936 Summer Olympics.
