= Kirkor Canbazyan =

Turkish cyclist

Personal information
- Born: 9 March 1912
- Died: 7 July 2002 (aged 90) Buenos Aires, Argentina

Cycling career
- Sport: Cycling

Kirkor Canbazyan (9 March 1912 – 7 July 2002) was a Turkish cyclist. He competed in the individual and team road race events at the 1936 Summer Olympics.
