= Kurt Ott =

Swiss cyclist

Personal information
- Born: 9 December 1912 Zurich, Switzerland
- Died: 19 April 2001 (aged 88) Schlieren, Switzerland

Cycling career
- Sport: Cycling
Medal record
Representing SUI
Men's cycling
Olympic Games
Silver medal – second place	1936 Berlin	Team road race

Kurt Ott (9 December 1912 – 19 April 2001) was a cyclist from Switzerland. He won the silver medal in the team road race at the 1936 Summer Olympics along with Ernst Nievergelt and Edgar Buchwalder.
