= Orhan Adaş =

Turkish fencer (1916–1984)

Personal information
- Born: 15 March 1916
- Died: September 1984 (aged 68)

Sport
- Sport: Fencing

Orhan Adaş (15 March 1916 – September 1984) was a Turkish fencer. He competed in the individual and team sabre events at the 1936 Summer Olympics. He pursued a career as an architect later in life.
