= Ivan Chureshki =

Bulgarian gymnast

- Иван Чурешки
- Born: 6 September 1908 Makotsevo, Bulgaria

Gymnastics career
- Discipline: Men's artistic gymnastics
- Country represented: Bulgaria

Ivan Chureshki (Bulgarian: Иван Чурешки) (born 6 September 1908, date of death unknown) was a Bulgarian gymnast. He competed in eight events at the 1936 Summer Olympics.
