= Gennadi Simov =

Bulgarian cyclist

Personal information
- Born: 3 March 1907

Cycling career
- Sport: Cycling

Gennadi Simov (Bulgarian: Генади Симов, born 3 March 1907, date of death unknown) was a Bulgarian cyclist. He competed in the individual and team road race events at the 1936 Summer Olympics.
