= Jesús Chousal =

Chilean cyclist (1911–1994)

Personal information
- Full name: Doroteo Jesús Chousal Jorquera
- Born: 7 April 1911 Valparaíso, Chile
- Died: 2 September 1994 (aged 83) Valparaiso, Chile

Cycling career
- Sport: Cycling

Jesús Chousal (7 April 1911 – 2 September 1994) was a Chilean cyclist. Chousal competed in the individual and team road race events at the 1936 Summer Olympics.
