= Kazım Bingen =

Turkish cyclist

Personal information
- Born: 5 May 1912

Cycling career
- Sport: Cycling

Kazım Bingen (born 5 May 1912, date of death unknown) was a Turkish cyclist. He competed in the individual and team road race events at the 1936 Summer Olympics.
