= Haralds Marvē =

Latvian sports shooter (1900–1983)

Personal information
- Born: 9 November 1900 Nītaure, Latvia
- Died: 11 October 1983 (aged 82) Hannover, Germany

Sport
- Sport: Sports shooting

Haralds Marvē (9 November 1900 – 11 October 1983) was a Latvian sports shooter. He competed in the 25 m pistol event at the 1936 Summer Olympics.
