= Mārtiņš Mazūrs =

Latvian cyclist

Personal information
- Born: 28 February 1908 Vircava parish, Latvia
- Died: 30 April 1995 (aged 87) Bauska, Latvia

Cycling career
- Sport: Cycling

Mārtiņš Mazūrs (28 February 1908 – 30 April 1995) was a Latvian cyclist. He competed in the individual and team road race events at the 1936 Summer Olympics.
