= Nikola Nenov =

Bulgarian cyclist

Personal information
- Born: 28 August 1907
- Died: 12 December 1996 (aged 89)

Cycling career
- Sport: Cycling

Nikola Nenov (Bulgarian: Никола Ненов, 28 August 1907 – 12 December 1996) was a Bulgarian cyclist. He competed in the individual and team road race events at the 1936 Summer Olympics.
