= Imre Győrffy =

Hungarian cyclist

Personal information
- Born: 24 December 1905 Budapest, Hungary
- Died: 1980 (aged 74–75)

Cycling career
- Sport: Cycling

Imre Győrffy (20 December 1905 – 1980) was a Hungarian cyclist. He competed in the sprint event at the 1936 Summer Olympics.
