= Emil Schöpflin =

German cyclist

Personal information
- Born: 26 July 1910 Berlin, German Empire
- Died: 20 November 1999 Rosenheim, Germany

Cycling career
- Sport: Cycling

Emil Schöpflin (26 July 1910 – 20 November 1999) was a German cyclist. He competed in the individual and team road race events at the 1936 Summer Olympics.
