= Enrique Ojeda (sport shooter) =

Chilean sports shooter

Personal information
- Born: 6 March 1904 Santiago, Chile
- Died: 29 April 1969 (aged 65) Santiago de los Caballeros, Dominican Republic

Sport
- Sport: Sports shooting

Enrique Ojeda (6 March 1904 – 29 April 1969) was a Chilean sports shooter. He competed at the 1936 Summer Olympics and 1952 Summer Olympics.
