= Edgar Buchwalder =

Swiss cyclist (1916–2009)

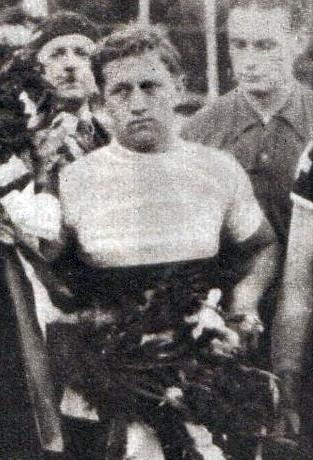

Personal information
- Born: 2 August 1916 Kleinlützel, Switzerland
- Died: 9 April 2009 (aged 92) Dornach, Switzerland
Medal record
Men's road bicycle racing
Representing Switzerland
Olympic Games
| Silver medal – second place | 1936 Berlin | Team road race |
World Championships
| Gold medal – first place | 1936 Bern | Amateur's Road Race |

Edgar Buchwalder (2 August 1916 – 9 April 2009) was a cyclist from Switzerland. He won the silver medal in the team road race at the 1936 Summer Olympics along with Ernst Nievergelt and Kurt Ott. He was the Swiss National Road Race champion in 1940 and 1942.
