= Jānis Vītols =

Latvian cyclist

Personal information
- Full name: Jānis Alfrēds Vītols
- Born: 31 January 1911 Jelgava, Latvia
- Died: 1993 (aged 81–82)

Cycling career
- Sport: Cycling

Jānis Alfrēds Vītols (31 January 1911 – 1993) was a Latvian cyclist. He competed in the individual and team road race events at the 1936 Summer Olympics.
