= Julio Moreno (fencer) =

Chilean fencer

Personal information
- Born: January 17, 1903
- Died: 19 May 1963 (aged 60)

Sport
- Sport: Fencing

Julio Moreno (17 January 1903 – 19 May 1963) was a Chilean fencer. He competed in the individual and team sabre and team épée events at the 1936 Summer Olympics.
