= Manuel Bacigalupo =

Peruvian cyclist

Personal information
- Born: 25 December 1916 Lima, Peru
- Died: 10 June 1965 (aged 48) Lima, Peru

Cycling career
- Sport: Cycling

Manuel Bacigalupo (25 December 1916 – 10 June 1965) was a Peruvian cyclist. He competed in the individual and team road race events at the 1936 Summer Olympics.
