= Tomas Barraza =

Chilean fencer

Personal information
- Born: December 20, 1907 Quellón, Chile
- Died: March 21, 1948 (aged 40)

Sport
- Sport: Fencing

Tomas Barraza (20 December 1907 – 21 March 1948) was a Chilean fencer. He competed in the individual and team épée and team sabre events at the 1936 Summer Olympics.
