= Robert Dorgebray =

French cyclist

Personal information
- Born: 16 October 1912 Nesles-la-Vallée, France
- Died: 29 September 2005 (aged 92) Paris, France

Cycling career
- Sport: Cycling
Medal record
Representing FRA
Men's cycling
Olympic Games
Gold medal – first place	1936 Berlin	Team road race

Robert Dorgebray (16 October 1915 – 29 September 2005) was a French cyclist who competed in the 1936 Summer Olympics. He won a gold medal in the team road race event. He also rode in the 1947 and 1949 Tour de France.
