= Aleksejs Jurjevs =

Latvian cyclist

Personal information
- Born: 12 October 1909 Riga, Latvia
- Died: September 1985 (aged 75–76)

Cycling career
- Sport: Cycling

Aleksejs Jurjevs (12 October 1909 – September 1985) was a Latvian cyclist. He competed in the individual and team road race events at the 1936 Summer Olympics.
