= Kanyo Dzhambazov =

Bulgarian cyclist

Personal information
- Born: 14 May 1911

Cycling career
- Sport: Cycling

Kanyo Dzhambazov (Bulgarian: Къньо Джамбазов, born 14 May 1911, date of death unknown) was a Bulgarian cyclist. He competed in the individual and team road race events at the 1936 Summer Olympics.
