= Al Sellinger =

American cyclist

Personal information
- Born: July 6, 1914 Newark, New Jersey, United States
- Died: April 1, 1986 (aged 71) Springfield, New Jersey, United States

Cycling career
- Sport: Cycling

Al Sellinger (July 6, 1914 – April 1, 1986) was an American cyclist. He competed in three events at the 1936 Summer Olympics.
