= Talat Tunçalp =

Turkish cyclist

Personal information
- Born: 1 October 1915 Istanbul, Ottoman Empire
- Died: 1 January 2017 (aged 101) Istanbul, Türkiye

Cycling career
- Sport: Cycling
- Discipline: Road
- Role: Rider

Talat Tunçalp (1 October 1915 – 1 January 2017) was a Turkish cyclist. He was born in Istanbul, Ottoman Empire in the mid-to-late 1910s, though his birth year was reported as both 1915 and 1917. He took up cycling and won his first sprint race in 1932. From 1933 through 1949, he was the Turkish National Champion in the road race 16 times and the sprint 15 times. He attended the 1936 Summer Olympics in Berlin, finishing joint eighth in the individual road race with his country failing to medal in the team version. He also participated in the 1948 Summer Olympics, but did not finish the individual race.

After retiring from active competition in 1949 he became president of the Turkish Cycling Federation in 1950 and held that position through 1968, the same year that he helped found what would become the Presidential Cycling Tour of Turkey. Upon the death of Halet Çambel on 14 January 2014, it was noted that Tunçalp was the oldest surviving Turkish Olympian. He died on 1 January 2017 at the age of 101. Tunçalp was interred at Zincirlikuyu Cemetery following the religious funeral service held at Şişli Mosque.
