= César Barros (fencer) =

Chilean fencer (1912–1992)

Personal information
- Born: 23 June 1912 Santiago, Chile
- Died: 12 March 1992 (aged 79) Santiago, Chile

Sport
- Country: Chile
- Sport: Fencing

César Jorge Barros Luther (23 June 1912 – 12 March 1992) was a Chilean fencer. He competed in the individual foil and team épée events at the 1936 Summer Olympics. Barros died in Santiago on 12 March 1992, at the age of 79.
