= Nikolaos Biris =

Greek wrestler

Personal information
- Nationality: Greek
- Born: 1911 Athens, Greece

Sport
- Sport: Wrestling

Nikolaos Biris (born 1911, date of death unknown) was a Greek wrestler. He competed at the 1936 Summer Olympics and the 1948 Summer Olympics.
