= Jef Lowagie =

Belgian cyclist

Personal information
- Born: 1 November 1903 Bredene, Belgium
- Died: 18 December 1985 (aged 82) Brussels, Belgium

Cycling career
- Sport: Cycling

Joseph "Jef" Lowagie (1 November 1903 – 18 December 1985) was a Belgian cyclist. He competed at the 1928 and 1936 Summer Olympics.
