= Dunc Gray =

Australian cyclist (1906–1996)

Personal information
- Full name: Edgar Laurence Gray
- Nickname: Dunc
- Born: 17 July 1906 Goulburn, New South Wales, Australia
- Died: 30 August 1996 (aged 90) Kiama, New South Wales, Australia

Cycling career
- Sport: Cycling
- Discipline: Track
- Role: Rider
- Rider type: Sprinter

Amateur team
- Goulburn Amateur Cycling Club
Medal record
Men's track cycling
Representing Australia
Olympic Games
Gold medal – first place	1932 Los Angeles	1000 m time trial
Bronze medal – third place	1928 Amsterdam	1000 m time trial
British Empire Games
Gold medal – first place	1934 London	1000 m time trial
Gold medal – first place	1938 Sydney	1000 m sprint

Edgar Laurence "Dunc" Gray (17 July 1906 – 30 August 1996) was an Australian track cyclist and Olympian.

Gray was born in Goulburn, New South Wales. He was called 'Dunc', which dates back to school where he was called 'Dunc' and this was later extended to 'Duncan'. He started competitive cycling with Goulburn Amateur Cycling Club around 1925. From 1926 to 1941 he won 20 Australian titles, 36 New South Wales titles, and 36 club championships. On eight occasions he was the NSW 1000m time trial and/or the 1000m sprint winner.

He won a bronze medal for the 1000m time trial at the 1928 Summer Olympics in Amsterdam. This was Australia's first Olympic Games medal in cycling. At the 1932 Summer Olympics in Los Angeles he won Australia's first cycling gold in the same event, in world record time of 1m 13s. He represented Australia at the 1934 British Empire Games and won the 1000m time trial. At the 1938 British Empire Games in Sydney, he won the 1000m sprint.

He was the flag-bearer for Australia at the 1936 Summer Olympics in Berlin and at the 1938 British Empire Games.

In his last years, Gray lived in Kiama and supported the Olympic movement, including Melbourne's bid for the 1996 Summer Olympics and then Sydney's successful bid for the 2000 Summer Olympics. The Dunc Gray Velodrome at Bass Hill, in Sydney's western suburbs, was built for the 2000 Summer Olympics in Sydney and named after him.

The Speedwell bike that Gray rode at the 1932 Summer Olympics is at the Dunc Gray velodrome. Speedwell bicycles were manufactured by Charles Bennett, a former Intercolonial Champion of Australia, who raced pennyfathings before Federation in 1901.

In 1985, Gray was inducted into the Sport Australia Hall of Fame. In 2015, he was an inaugural Cycling Australia Hall of Fame inductee.

Sporting positions
Preceded by (Finland) Ilmari Salminen	President of Organizing Committee for Summer Olympic Games; 1956	Succeeded by (Italy) Giulio Carlo Argan
