= Yaşar Erkan =

Turkish wrestler (1911–1986)

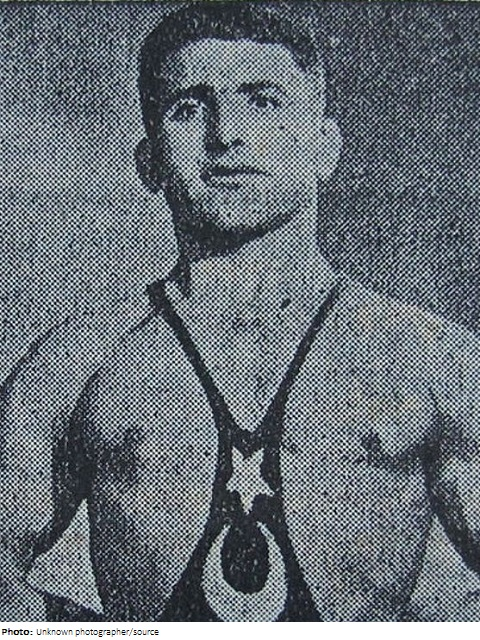
- Erkan at the 1936 Summer Olympics

Personal information
- Born: 30 April 1911 Erzincan, Ottoman Empire
- Died: 18 May 1986 (aged 75) Istanbul, Turkey
- Height: 1.68 m (5 ft 6 in)
- Weight: 62 kg (137 lb)

Sport
- Sport: Wrestling
- Events: Greco-Roman; Freestyle
Medal record
Men's Greco-Roman wrestling
Representing Turkey
Olympic Games
Gold medal – first place	1936 Berlin	Featherweight (61 kg)
Balkan Championships
Gold medal – first place	1933 Istanbul	61 kg
Gold medal – first place	1934 Istanbul	61 kg
Gold medal – first place	1935 Istanbul	61 kg
Gold medal – first place	1937 İzmir	61 kg

Yaşar Erkan (30 April 1911 – 18 May 1986) was a Turkish sports wrestler, who won the first ever Olympic gold medal for Turkey in the Featherweight class of Men's Greco-Roman Wrestling. Yaşar Erkan is the first Olympic champion in Turkish history.

== Wrestling career ==
Son of a wrestler for yağlı güreş (oil wrestling), he moved with his family from their village İspidi in the Refahiye district of Erzincan Province to Istanbul at 4 years of age. He started wrestling at Kumkapı Wrestling Club and grew up here. His father Ali Efendi was also one of the famous wrestlers of their village. Yaşar Erkan was selected to the Turkish National Wrestling Team in 1933 and won the Balkan Championship in the same year. He also held this title in 1934 and 1935. In 1936, he became the first ever Turkish sportsman to win a gold medal at the Olympics.

"You are small, but you have done an important job for the country. Now your name has gone down in Turkish sports history. Long live Yaşar!". The telegram is from Mustafa Kemal Atatürk. Later, Erkan was presented with a house by Atatürk, and the athlete's surname "Naçar", meaning helpless, was changed by Atatürk to "Erkan", meaning a prominent member of a community. Yaşar Erkan was also a tailor.

Erkan died on 18 May 1986. His grave is in Merkezefendi Cemetery in Zeytinburnu.
