= Hermogenes Valdebenito =

Chilean fencer (1901–1979)

Hermogenes Valdebenito Vargas
Personal information
- Born: 3 June 1901 Traiguén, Chile
- Died: 20 April 1979 (aged 77) San Miguel, Chile

Sport
- Sport: Fencing

Hermogenes Valdebenito (3 June 1901 – 20 April 1979) was a Chilean fencer. He competed in the individual foil event at the 1936 Summer Olympics.
