= Orhan Suda =

Turkish cyclist

Personal information
- Born: 1 July 1916 Adapazarı, Turkey
- Died: 15 December 1978 (aged 62)

Cycling career
- Sport: Cycling

Orhan Suda (1 July 1916 – 15 December 1978) was a Turkish cyclist. He competed in the two events at the 1936 Summer Olympics and two events at the 1948 Summer Olympics.
