= Manuel Riquelme (cyclist) =

Chilean cyclist

Personal information
- Born: 2 June 1912

Cycling career
- Sport: Cycling

Manuel Riquelme (2 June 1912, date of death unknown) was a Chilean cyclist. He competed in the three events at the 1936 Summer Olympics.
