= José Mazzini =

Peruvian cyclist (1909–??)

Personal information
- Born: 9 December 1909

Cycling career
- Sport: Cycling

José Mazzini (born 9 December 1909, date of death unknown) was a Peruvian cyclist. He competed in the three events at the 1936 Summer Olympics.
