= Fencing at the 1936 Summer Olympics – Men's team sabre =

Men's team sabre at the Games of the XI Olympiad
- Venue: Imperial Sports Field, Berlin
- Dates: 12 – 13 August 1936
- Competitors: 107 from 21 nations

Medalists
| 1st place, gold medalist(s) | | Aladár Gerevich, Tibor Berczelly, Pál Kovács, Endre Kabos, László Rajcsányi, Imre Rajczy | Hungary |
| 2nd place, silver medalist(s) | | Giulio Gaudini, Gustavo Marzi, Aldo Masciotta, Vincenzo Pinton, Aldo Montano, Athos Tanzini | Italy |
| 3rd place, bronze medalist(s) | | Richard Wahl, Julius Eisenecker, Erwin Casmir, August Heim, Hans Esser, Hans-Georg Jörger | Germany |

The men's team sabre was one of seven fencing events on the fencing at the 1936 Summer Olympics programme. It was the seventh appearance of the event. The competition was held from 12 August 1936 to 13 August 1936. 107 fencers from 21 nations competed. Each team could have a maximum of six fencers, with four participating in any given match.

The competition format continued the pool play round-robin from prior years. Each of the four fencers from one team would face each of the four from the other, for a total of 16 bouts per match. The team that won more bouts won the match, with competition potentially stopping when one team reached 9 points out of the possible 16 (this did not always occur and matches sometimes continued). If the bouts were 8–8, touches received was used to determine the winning team. Pool matches unnecessary to the result were not played.

== Rosters ==
Austria

- Josef Losert
- Hugo Weczerek
- Karl Sudrich
- Hubert Loisel
- Karl Hanisch
- Karl Kaschka

Belgium

- Eugène Laermans
- Georges Heywaert
- Robert Van Den Neucker
- Henri Brasseur
- Hubert Van Nerom

Canada

- Ernest Dalton
- Charles Otis
- George Tully
- Don Collinge

Chile

- Efrain Díaz
- Tomas Barraza
- Ricardo Romero
- Julio Moreno
- Tomás Goyoaga

Czechoslovakia

- Josef Jungmann
- Jozef Benedik
- Hervarth Frass von Friedenfeldt
- Bohuslav Kirchmann
- Josef Hildebrand

Denmark

- Erik Hammer Sørensen
- Preben Christiansen
- Aage Leidersdorff
- Svend Jacobsen

France

- Marcel Faure
- Maurice Gramain
- Edward Gardère
- Jean Piot
- Roger Barisien
- André Gardère

Germany

- Richard Wahl
- Julius Eisenecker
- Erwin Casmir
- August Heim
- Hans Esser
- Hans-Georg Jörger

Great Britain

- Oliver Trinder
- Arthur Pilbrow
- Guy Harry
- Robin Brook
- Roger Tredgold

Greece

- Nikolaos Manolesos
- Nikolaos Paparrodou
- Konstantinos Botasis
- Menelaos Psarrakis

Hungary

- Aladár Gerevich
- Tibor Berczelly
- Pál Kovács
- Endre Kabos
- László Rajcsányi
- Imre Rajczy

Italy

- Giulio Gaudini
- Gustavo Marzi
- Aldo Masciotta
- Vincenzo Pinton
- Aldo Montano
- Athos Tanzini

Netherlands

- Ate Faber
- Antonius Montfoort
- Frans Mosman
- Pieter van Wieringen
- Jacob Schriever

Poland

- Antoni Sobik
- Władysław Segda
- Władysław Dobrowolski
- Adam Papée
- Marian Suski
- Teodor Zaczyk

Romania

- Nicolae Marinescu
- Gheorghe Man
- Kamilló Szathmáry
- Denis Dolecsko

Sweden

- Bengt Ljungquist
- Knut Nordholm
- Hubert de Bèsche
- Ivar Tingdahl
- Carl Johan Wachtmeister

Switzerland

- Charles Glasstetter
- Alphonse Ruckstuhl
- Walter Widemann
- Adolf Stocker

Turkey

- Ilhami Çene
- Enver Balkan
- Cihat Teğin
- Abdul Halim Tokmakçioğlu
- Orhan Adaş

United States

- Peter Bruder
- Miguel de Capriles
- Bela De Nagy
- John Huffman
- Samuel Stewart
- Norman Cohn-Armitage

Uruguay

- Carmelo Bentancur
- José Julián de la Fuente
- Hildemaro Lista
- París Rodríguez
- Jorge Rolando

Yugoslavia

- Krešo Tretinjak
- Milivoj Radović
- Eugen Jakobčič
- Edo Marion
- Pavao Pintarić

== Results ==
=== Round 1 ===
The top two teams in each pool advanced to round 2.

==== Pool 1 ====
Germany and Uruguay each defeated Romania, so Romania was eliminated and Germany and Uruguay did not face each other.

| Rank | Country | Points | MW | ML | BW | BL | Notes |
|---|---|---|---|---|---|---|---|
| 1 | Germany | 2 | 1 | 0 | 10 | 6 | Q |
| 2 | Uruguay | 2 | 1 | 0 | 8 | 8 | Q |
| 3 | Romania | 0 | 0 | 2 | 14 | 18 | |

==== Pool 2 ====
Brazil withdrew before competing, leaving Austria and Sweden to advance by default.

| Rank | Country | Points | MW | ML | BW | BL | Notes |
|---|---|---|---|---|---|---|---|
| 1 | Austria | 0 | 0 | 0 | 0 | 0 | Q |
| 1 | Sweden | 0 | 0 | 0 | 0 | 0 | Q |
| – | Brazil | 0 | 0 | 0 | 0 | 0 | DNS |

==== Pool 3 ====
Hungary defeated Denmark 16–0. Belgium then defeated Denmark, with the match stopped at 9–1 when Denmark's loss (and elimination) was assured.

| Rank | Country | Points | MW | ML | BW | BL | Notes |
|---|---|---|---|---|---|---|---|
| 1 | Hungary | 2 | 1 | 0 | 16 | 0 | Q |
| 2 | Belgium | 2 | 1 | 0 | 9 | 1 | Q |
| 3 | Denmark | 0 | 0 | 2 | 1 | 25 | |

==== Pool 4 ====
Czechoslovakia defeated Greece 11–5. Poland then defeated Greece, with the match stopped at 9–3 when Greece's loss (and elimination) was assured.

| Rank | Country | Points | MW | ML | BW | BL | Notes |
|---|---|---|---|---|---|---|---|
| 1 | Poland | 2 | 1 | 0 | 9 | 3 | Q |
| 2 | Czechoslovakia | 2 | 1 | 0 | 11 | 5 | Q |
| 3 | Greece | 0 | 0 | 2 | 8 | 20 | |

==== Pool 5 ====
The Netherlands defeated Chile 13–3. Great Britain then defeated Chile, 10–6, resulting in Chile's elimination.

| Rank | Country | Points | MW | ML | BW | BL | Notes |
|---|---|---|---|---|---|---|---|
| 1 | Netherlands | 2 | 1 | 0 | 13 | 3 | Q |
| 2 | Great Britain | 2 | 1 | 0 | 10 | 6 | Q |
| 3 | Chile | 0 | 0 | 2 | 8 | 20 | |

==== Pool 6 ====
France defeated Canada 13–3. Italy then defeated Canada, 15–1, resulting in Canada's elimination.

| Rank | Country | Points | MW | ML | BW | BL | Notes |
|---|---|---|---|---|---|---|---|
| 1 | Italy | 2 | 1 | 0 | 15 | 1 | Q |
| 2 | France | 2 | 1 | 0 | 13 | 3 | Q |
| 3 | Canada | 0 | 0 | 2 | 4 | 28 | |

==== Pool 7 ====
In the first set of matches, the United States defeated Switzerland while Turkey defeated Yugoslavia. The second pair of matches saw the United States win again, this time over Turkey, while Switzerland defeated Yugoslavia. This resulted in the United States being guaranteed advancement while Yugoslavia was eliminated (and thus the two did not face each other). Turkey and Switzerland, each 1–1, faced each other for the final advancement spot, with Turkey winning on touches received 58–70 after the individual bouts were tied 8–8.

| Rank | Country | Points | MW | ML | BW | BL | Notes |
|---|---|---|---|---|---|---|---|
| 1 | United States | 4 | 2 | 0 | 26 | 6 | Q |
| 2 | Turkey | 4 | 2 | 1 | 19 | 29 | Q |
| 3 | Switzerland | 2 | 1 | 2 | 21 | 27 | |
| 4 | Yugoslavia | 0 | 0 | 2 | 14 | 18 | |

=== Round 2 ===
The top two teams in each pool advanced to the semifinals.

==== Pool 1 ====
Austria and Hungary each defeated Uruguay, so Uruguay was eliminated and Austria and Hungary did not face each other.

| Rank | Country | Points | MW | ML | BW | BL | Notes |
|---|---|---|---|---|---|---|---|
| 1 | Hungary | 2 | 1 | 0 | 14 | 2 | Q |
| 2 | Austria | 2 | 1 | 0 | 11 | 5 | Q |
| 3 | Uruguay | 0 | 0 | 2 | 7 | 25 | |

==== Pool 2 ====
Belgium defeated Germany, 9–7, while Great Britain and France each took 8 individual bouts and France won on touches received, 56–65. In the second set of matches, Germany defeated France and Great Britain defeated Belgium, each by 11–5. This left all four teams at 1–1, so the last matches were each winner-advances. Germany prevailed over Great Britain, 11–5. France had its second match of the round go to 8–8, winning again by touches received, 60–63.

| Rank | Country | Points | MW | ML | BW | BL | Notes |
|---|---|---|---|---|---|---|---|
| 1 | Germany | 4 | 2 | 1 | 29 | 19 | Q |
| 2 | France | 4 | 2 | 1 | 21 | 27 | Q |
| 3 | Great Britain | 2 | 1 | 2 | 24 | 24 | |
| 4 | Belgium | 2 | 1 | 2 | 22 | 26 | |

==== Pool 3 ====
The Netherlands defeated Czechoslovakia 14–2. Italy then defeated Czechoslovakia, with the match stopped at 9–5 when Czechoslovakia's loss (and elimination) was assured.

| Rank | Country | Points | MW | ML | BW | BL | Notes |
|---|---|---|---|---|---|---|---|
| 1 | Netherlands | 2 | 1 | 0 | 12 | 4 | Q |
| 2 | Italy | 2 | 1 | 0 | 9 | 5 | Q |
| 3 | Czechoslovakia | 0 | 0 | 2 | 9 | 21 | |

==== Pool 4 ====
Poland defeated Sweden, 15–1. The United States was supposed to face Turkey, who the Americans had defeated in the first round, but this match did not occur due to Turkey's non-competition. This was not a withdrawal from competition, as Turkey later faced Poland; nor does it seem to be a case of using the prior result again, as the official report points specifically to Turkey and states the team "did not compete." Sports-reference gives the result as a win for the United States and loss for Turkey, with 0–0 individual bouts. The second set of matches in the round featured the United States against Sweden (stopped at a 9–1 United States win) and the aforementioned Poland–Turkey match (stopped at a 9–2 Poland win). Counting the U.S.–Turkey non-match as a United States win left Poland and the United States at 2–0 and advancing to the semifinals while Sweden and Turkey were 0–2 and eliminated; the third set of matches did not take place.

| Rank | Country | Points | MW | ML | BW | BL | Notes |
|---|---|---|---|---|---|---|---|
| 1 | United States | 4 | 2 | 0 | 9 | 1 | Q |
| 2 | Poland | 4 | 2 | 0 | 24 | 3 | Q |
| 3 | Sweden | 0 | 0 | 2 | 2 | 24 | |
| 4 | Turkey | 0 | 0 | 1 | 2 | 9 | |

=== Semifinals ===
The top two teams in each pool advanced to the final.

==== Pool 1 ====
In the first set of matches, Poland defeated France (10–6) while Italy defeated Austria (9–7). In the second, the winners each won again to end the competition: Poland prevailed over Austria by touches received 56–60 (8–8 bouts) and Italy beat France with the match stopped at 9–2.

| Rank | Country | Points | MW | ML | BW | BL | Notes |
|---|---|---|---|---|---|---|---|
| 1 | Italy | 4 | 2 | 0 | 18 | 9 | Q |
| 2 | Poland | 4 | 2 | 0 | 18 | 14 | Q |
| 3 | Austria | 0 | 0 | 2 | 15 | 17 | |
| 4 | France | 0 | 0 | 2 | 8 | 19 | |

==== Pool 2 ====
Hungary defeated Germany, 15–1, while the United States beat the Netherlands, 9–7. In the second set of matches, Hungary again won 15–1, this time over the Netherlands, while Germany defeated the United States 9–7. In the final set of matches, Hungary beat the United States 14–2 and Germany defeated the Netherlands 9–3 with both of the winners earning advancement.

| Rank | Country | Points | MW | ML | BW | BL | Notes |
|---|---|---|---|---|---|---|---|
| 1 | Hungary | 6 | 3 | 0 | 44 | 4 | Q |
| 2 | Germany | 4 | 2 | 1 | 19 | 25 | Q |
| 3 | United States | 2 | 1 | 2 | 18 | 30 | |
| 4 | Netherlands | 0 | 0 | 3 | 11 | 33 | |

=== Final ===
In the first set of matches, Hungary defeated Germany (13–3) while Italy defeated Poland (10–6). In the second, the winners each won again: Hungary prevailed over Poland (10–1) and Italy beat Germany (9–2). Both matches were stopped early as it became clear that Hungary and Italy would both be 2–0 and facing each other in the last set of matches while Germany and Poland would each by 0–2 and facing each other; there would be no tie in the standings to break through bouts lost. The Hungary–Italy match was a de facto gold medal final; Hungary reached 9 wins after 15 bouts to take the victory (9–6). Germany–Poland decided the bronze medal, with Germany taking that honor (9–3).

| Rank | Country | Points | MW | ML | BW | BL |
|---|---|---|---|---|---|---|
| 1st place, gold medalist(s) | Hungary | 6 | 3 | 0 | 32 | 10 |
| 2nd place, silver medalist(s) | Italy | 4 | 2 | 1 | 25 | 17 |
| 3rd place, bronze medalist(s) | Germany | 2 | 1 | 2 | 14 | 25 |
| 4 | Poland | 0 | 0 | 3 | 10 | 29 |
