= Fencing at the 1936 Summer Olympics – Men's sabre =

Olympic fencing tournament

Men's sabre at the Games of the XI Olympiad
- Venue: Imperial Sports Field, Berlin
- Dates: 14–15 August 1936
- Competitors: 71 from 26 nations

Medalists
1st place, gold medalist(s)		Endre Kabos	Hungary
2nd place, silver medalist(s)		Gustavo Marzi	Italy
3rd place, bronze medalist(s)		Aladár Gerevich	Hungary

The men's sabre was one of seven fencing events on the fencing at the 1936 Summer Olympics programme. It was the tenth appearance of the event. The competition was held from 14 August 1936 to 15 August 1936. 71 fencers from 26 nations competed. Nations were limited to three fencers each. The event was won by Endre Kabos of Hungary, the fourth of nine straight Games in which a Hungarian would win the event. Kabos became the second man to win multiple medals in the individual sabre, adding to his 1932 bronze. Gustavo Marzi of Italy took silver, while Hungarian Aladár Gerevich earned bronze.

== Background ==
This was the 10th appearance of the event, which is the only fencing event to have been held at every Summer Olympics. Four of the ten finalists from 1932 returned: silver medalist Giulio Gaudini of Italy, bronze medalist Endre Kabos of Hungary, and sixth-place finisher John Huffman and ninth-place finisher Norman Cohn-Armitage of the United States. Hungary, dominant in the event since the 1908 Games, was expected to perform well again. Kabos had won the world championships in 1933 and 1934; teammate Aladár Gerevich had won in 1935.

Brazil and Costa Rica each made their debut in the men's sabre. Italy and Denmark each made their eighth appearance in the event, tied for most of any nation, each having missed two of the first three events but having appeared every Games since 1908.

== Competition format ==
The competition format was pool play round-robin, with bouts to five touches. Not all bouts were played in some pools if not necessary to determine advancement. Two points were awarded for each bout won. Ties were broken through fence-off bouts in early rounds if necessary for determining advancement, but by touches received in final rounds (and for non-advancement-necessary placement in earlier rounds).

- Round 1: There 9 pools of between 7 and 9 fencers each. The top 4 fencers in each pool advanced to the quarterfinals.
- Quarterfinals: There were 6 pools of 6 fencers each. The top 3 fencers in each quarterfinal advanced to the semifinals.
- Semifinals: There were 3 pools of 6 fencers each. The top 3 fencers in each semifinal advanced to the final.
- Final: The final pool had 9 fencers.

== Schedule ==
Date	Time	Round
Friday, 14 August 1936	9:00; 15:00; 17:00	Round 1 Quarterfinals; Semifinals
Saturday, 15 August 1936	15:00	Final

== Results ==
=== Round 1 ===
The top four fencers in each pool advanced to the quarterfinals.

==== Pool 1 ====
Brook defeated Bentancur in the play-off for fourth place and the last advancement spot.

Rank	Fencer	Nation	Points	Wins	Losses	TS	TR	Notes
1	Aladár Gerevich	Hungary	12	6	0	30	9	Q
2	Marcel Faure	France	10	5	1	28	14	Q
3	Władysław Segda	Poland	10	5	2	31	22	Q
4	Robin Brook	Great Britain	8	4	3	26	24	Q
5	Carmelo Bentancur	Uruguay	8	4	3	28	28	
6	José Manuel Brunet	Argentina	2	1	6	20	33	
6	Menelaos Psarrakis	Greece	2	1	6	17	33	
8	Georges Heywaert	Belgium	2	1	6	19	34	

==== Pool 2 ====
Rank	Fencer	Nation	Points	Wins	Losses	TS	TR	Notes
1	Endre Kabos	Hungary	16	8	0	40	9	Q
2	Jozef Benedik	Czechoslovakia	12	6	2	35	24	Q
3	August Heim	Germany	10	5	3	34	25	Q
4	Denis Dolecsko	Romania	10	5	3	29	29	Q
5	Efrain Díaz	Chile	8	4	4	27	28	
5	Jean Piot	France	8	4	4	28	28	
7	Bengt Ljungquist	Sweden	6	3	5	28	31	
8	Cihat Teğin	Turkey	2	1	7	22	37	
9	Charles Otis	Canada	0	0	8	8	40	

==== Pool 3 ====
Rank	Fencer	Nation	Points	Wins	Losses	TS	TR	Notes
1	Edward Gardère	France	12	6	0	30	16	Q
2	Giulio Gaudini	Italy	10	5	1	29	12	Q
3	Nicolae Marinescu	Romania	8	4	2	24	17	Q
4	Antonius Montfoort	Netherlands	8	4	2	24	19	Q
5	George Tully	Canada	4	2	4	16	21	
6	Norman Cohn-Armitage	United States	4	2	4	21	26	
7	Orhan Adaş	Turkey	2	1	5	14	28	
8	Moacyr Dunham	Brazil	0	0	6	11	30	

==== Pool 4 ====
Harry defeated Szatmary in the play-off for fourth place and the last advancement spot.

Rank	Fencer	Nation	Points	Wins	Losses	TS	TR	Notes
1	Karl Sudrich	Austria	14	7	1	39	23	Q
2	László Rajcsányi	Hungary	12	6	1	34	14	Q
3	Nikolaos Manolesos	Greece	12	6	1	33	23	Q
4	Guy Harry	Great Britain	8	4	4	30	30	Q
5	Kamilló Szathmáry	Romania	8	4	4	31	27	
6	Hubert de Bèsche	Sweden	6	3	4	22	25	
7	Adolf Stocker	Switzerland	6	3	5	28	32	
8	Krešo Tretinjak	Yugoslavia	0	0	6	13	30	
9	Ennio de Oliveira	Brazil	0	0	7	9	35	

==== Pool 5 ====
Moreno was the winner of the three-way play-off with Kirchmann and Christiansen for fourth place and the last advancement spot.

Rank	Fencer	Nation	Points	Wins	Losses	TS	TR	Notes
1	Josef Losert	Austria	10	5	1	27	15	Q
2	Antoni Sobik	Poland	10	5	2	32	20	Q
3	Robert Van Den Neucker	Belgium	10	5	2	32	22	Q
4	Julio Moreno	Chile	6	3	4	22	26	Q
5	Bohuslav Kirchmann	Czechoslovakia	6	3	4	22	27	
6	Preben Christiansen	Denmark	6	3	4	26	29	
7	Mohamed Abdel Rahman	Egypt	4	2	5	20	31	
8	Alphonse Ruckstuhl	Switzerland	2	1	5	17	28	

==== Pool 6 ====
Rank	Fencer	Nation	Points	Wins	Losses	TS	TR	Notes
1	Eugène Laermans	Belgium	10	5	1	24	18	Q
2	Aage Leidersdorff	Denmark	8	4	0	20	15	Q
3	Hubert Loisel	Austria	6	3	2	21	16	Q
3	Vicente Krause	Argentina	6	3	2	20	16	Q
5	Tomás Goyoaga	Chile	2	1	4	16	23	
5	Enver Balkan	Turkey	2	1	4	14	23	
7	Charles Glasstetter	Switzerland	0	0	4	11	20	

==== Pool 7 ====
The official report lists a three-way for second-place, but under the scoring system in use Wahl was alone due to fewest touches received.

Rank	Fencer	Nation	Points	Wins	Losses	TS	TR	Notes
1	John Huffman	United States	12	6	0	30	13	Q
2	Richard Wahl	Germany	8	4	1	21	14	Q
3	Hervarth Frass von Friedenfeldt	Czechoslovakia	8	4	2	25	18	Q
3	José Julián de la Fuente	Uruguay	8	4	2	25	18	Q
5	Konstantinos Botasis	Greece	4	2	4	24	26	
6	Don Collinge	Canada	4	2	5	20	33	
7	Bernardo de la Guardia	Costa Rica	2	1	5	17	28	
7	Erik Hammer Sørensen	Denmark	2	1	5	16	28	

==== Pool 8 ====
Rank	Fencer	Nation	Points	Wins	Losses	TS	TR	Notes
1	Vincenzo Pinton	Italy	10	5	0	25	9	Q
2	Dimitar Vasilev	Bulgaria	8	4	2	23	17	Q
3	París Rodríguez	Uruguay	8	4	2	27	18	Q
4	Pieter van Wieringen	Netherlands	6	3	3	22	24	Q
5	Ivar Tingdahl	Sweden	4	2	4	18	26	
6	Carmelo Merlo	Argentina	2	1	4	14	22	
7	Pavao Pintarić	Yugoslavia	2	1	5	16	29	

==== Pool 9 ====
Rank	Fencer	Nation	Points	Wins	Losses	TS	TR	Notes
1	Gustavo Marzi	Italy	8	4	1	22	12	Q
2	Frans Mosman	Netherlands	8	4	2	25	17	Q
3	Władysław Dobrowolski	Poland	8	4	1	22	19	Q
4	Oliver Trinder	Great Britain	8	4	2	26	20	Q
5	Peter Bruder	United States	6	3	3	22	19	
6	Lodovico Alessandri	Brazil	2	1	5	12	28	
7	Milivoj Radović	Yugoslavia	0	0	6	16	30	

=== Quarterfinals ===
The top three fencers in each pool advanced to the semifinals.

==== Quarterfinal 1 ====
Rank	Fencer	Nation	Points	Wins	Losses	TS	TR	Notes
1	Hubert Loisel	Austria	6	3	2	18	12	Q
2	László Rajcsányi	Hungary	6	3	2	21	15	Q
3	José Julián de la Fuente	Uruguay	6	3	2	16	18	Q
4	Guy Harry	Great Britain	4	2	3	19	18	
5	Eugène Laermans	Belgium	4	2	3	16	21	
5	Jozef Benedik	Czechoslovakia	4	2	3	15	21	

==== Quarterfinal 2 ====
Rank	Fencer	Nation	Points	Wins	Losses	TS	TR	Notes
1	Giulio Gaudini	Italy	6	3	1	18	10	Q
2	Pieter van Wieringen	Netherlands	6	3	1	18	13	Q
2	Władysław Segda	Poland	6	3	1	18	13	Q
4	Karl Sudrich	Austria	2	1	3	17	18	
4	Richard Wahl	Germany	2	1	3	7	18	
6	Hervarth Frass von Friedenfeldt	Czechoslovakia	2	1	3	13	19	

==== Quarterfinal 3 ====
Rank	Fencer	Nation	Points	Wins	Losses	TS	TR	Notes
1	Gustavo Marzi	Italy	10	5	0	25	13	Q
2	Oliver Trinder	Great Britain	6	3	2	22	13	Q
3	Edward Gardère	France	6	3	2	21	20	Q
4	August Heim	Germany	4	2	3	17	18	
5	Aage Leidersdorff	Denmark	2	1	4	16	23	
6	Denis Dolecsko	Romania	2	1	4	10	24	

==== Quarterfinal 4 ====
Vasilev won the three-way play-off against Krause and Montfoort for third place and the last advancement spot.

Rank	Fencer	Nation	Points	Wins	Losses	TS	TR	Notes
1	Endre Kabos	Hungary	10	5	0	25	9	Q
2	Josef Losert	Austria	6	3	2	21	14	Q
3	Dimitar Vasilev	Bulgaria	4	2	3	12	16	Q
4	Vicente Krause	Argentina	4	2	3	20	18	
5	Antonius Montfoort	Netherlands	4	2	3	16	21	
6	Nikolaos Manolesos	Greece	2	1	4	8	24	

==== Quarterfinal 5 ====
Rank	Fencer	Nation	Points	Wins	Losses	TS	TR	Notes
1	París Rodríguez	Uruguay	6	3	1	16	9	Q
2	Aladár Gerevich	Hungary	6	3	1	17	13	Q
3	Robert Van Den Neucker	Belgium	6	3	2	20	18	Q
4	Władysław Dobrowolski	Poland	4	2	3	19	19	
5	John Huffman	United States	2	1	3	12	15	
6	Julio Moreno	Chile	2	1	3	9	19	

==== Quarterfinal 6 ====
Rank	Fencer	Nation	Points	Wins	Losses	TS	TR	Notes
1	Vincenzo Pinton	Italy	8	4	0	20	11	Q
2	Marcel Faure	France	6	3	1	16	11	Q
3	Antoni Sobik	Poland	6	3	1	19	12	Q
4	Frans Mosman	Netherlands	2	1	3	16	17	
5	Robin Brook	Great Britain	2	1	3	11	18	
6	Nicolae Marinescu	Romania	0	0	4	7	20	

=== Semifinals ===
The top three fencers in each pool advanced to the final.

==== Semifinal 1 ====
Rank	Fencer	Nation	Points	Wins	Losses	TS	TR	Notes
1	Aladár Gerevich	Hungary	6	3	0	15	7	Q
2	Robert Van Den Neucker	Belgium	6	3	0	15	9	Q
3	Gustavo Marzi	Italy	6	3	1	17	11	Q
4	Oliver Trinder	Great Britain	2	1	3	12	17	
5	Marcel Faure	France	2	1	3	11	18	
6	Hubert Loisel	Austria	0	0	4	12	20	

==== Semifinal 2 ====
Rank	Fencer	Nation	Points	Wins	Losses	TS	TR	Notes
1	Endre Kabos	Hungary	8	4	0	20	11	Q
2	Antoni Sobik	Poland	8	4	1	22	14	Q
3	Giulio Gaudini	Italy	6	3	2	20	18	Q
4	París Rodríguez	Uruguay	4	2	3	19	17	
5	Pieter van Wieringen	Netherlands	2	1	3	10	15	
6	Edward Gardère	France	0	0	5	9	25	

==== Semifinal 3 ====
Rank	Fencer	Nation	Points	Wins	Losses	TS	TR	Notes
1	Vincenzo Pinton	Italy	8	4	0	20	9	Q
2	Josef Losert	Austria	6	3	1	17	11	Q
3	László Rajcsányi	Hungary	6	3	2	20	13	Q
4	Władysław Segda	Poland	4	2	3	14	22	
5	José Julián de la Fuente	Uruguay	2	1	3	12	18	
6	Dimitar Vasilev	Bulgaria	0	0	4	10	20	

=== Final ===
Ties in the final, including the tie for silver, were broken by touches received rather than play-off bouts. Thus, even though Gerevich had defeated Marzi in their bout during the pool play, Marzi took the silver and Gerevich bronze without any rematch due to the 22–26 advantage Marzi had in touches received. Kabos's loss to Marzi was his only loss in the entire tournament, as he finished 24–1 overall.

Rank	Fencer	Nation	Points	Wins	Losses	TS	TR
1st place, gold medalist(s)	Endre Kabos	Hungary	14	7	1	37	20
2nd place, silver medalist(s)	Gustavo Marzi	Italy	12	6	2	35	22
3rd place, bronze medalist(s)	Aladár Gerevich	Hungary	12	6	2	37	26
4	László Rajcsányi	Hungary	10	5	3	34	25
5	Vincenzo Pinton	Italy	10	5	3	32	28
6	Giulio Gaudini	Italy	6	3	5	27	28
7	Antoni Sobik	Poland	4	2	6	22	34
8	Josef Losert	Austria	4	2	6	20	36
9	Robert Van Den Neucker	Belgium	0	0	8	15	40
