= Modern pentathlon at the 1936 Summer Olympics =

Men's modern pentathlon at the Games of the XI Olympiad
- Venue: l
- Dates: August 2–6, 1936
- Competitors: 42 from 16 nations

Medalists
1st place, gold medalist(s)		Gotthard Handrick	Germany
2nd place, silver medalist(s)		Charles Leonard	United States
3rd place, bronze medalist(s)		Silvano Abba	Italy

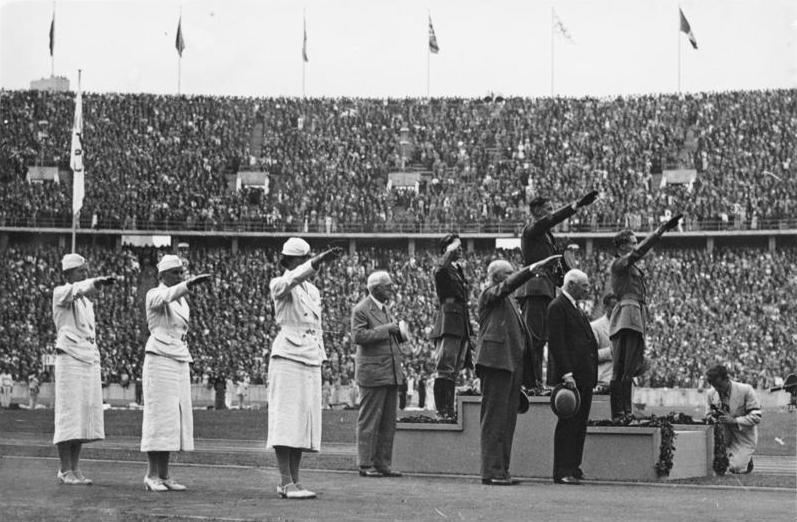
Medal ceremony for the modern pentathlon.

At the 1936 Summer Olympics in Berlin, a single modern pentathlon event was contested. The 1936 modern pentathlon marked the first time since the event was introduced in 1912 that no medals were won by Swedish athletes.

== Medalists ==
Gold	Gotthard Handrick; Germany
Silver	Charles Leonard; United States
Bronze	Silvano Abba; Italy

== Participating nations ==
A total of 42 athletes from 16 nations competed at the Berlin Games:

- Austria (2)
- Belgium (3)
- Brazil (3)
- Finland (3)
- France (3)
- Germany (3)
- Great Britain (3)
- Greece (1)
- Hungary (3)
- Italy (3)
- Mexico (2)
- Netherlands (3)
- Peru (1)
- Sweden (3)
- Switzerland (3)
- United States (3)

== Results ==
The method of scoring was point-for-place. First place received one point, second place received two, and so on. The athlete with the fewest points won the event.

=== Riding ===
Rank	Athlete	Country	Time	Penalties
1	Silvano Abba	Italy	9:02.5	0
2	Gotthardt Handrick	Germany	9:09.6	0
2	Raoul Mollet	Belgium	9:09.6	0
4	Nándor von Orbán	Hungary	9:10.3	0
5	Édouard Écuyer de le Court	Belgium	9:13.0	0
6	Luis Casíllas	Mexico	9:16.0	0
7	Hans Baumann	Switzerland	9:24.4	0
8	Sven Thofelt	Sweden	9:27.9	0
8	Alfred Starbird	United States	9:27.9	0
10	Ebbe Gyllenstierna	Sweden	9:31.7	0
11	Lauri Kettunen	Finland	9:34.0	0
12	Alexander Jonkheer van Geen	Netherlands	9:34.8	0
13	Willy Grundbacher	Switzerland	9:37.0	0
14	Karl Wyss	Switzerland	9:37.6	0
15	Charles Leonard	United States	9:47.0	0
16	Ukko Hietala	Finland	9:48.3	0
17	Jeffrey MacDougall	Great Britain	9:52.4	0
18	Humberto Anguiano	Mexico	9:52.7	0
19	Johannes van der Horst	Netherlands	10:05.3	0
20	Alexandros Baltatzis-Mavrokorlatis	Greece	10:09.7	0
21	Josephus Serré	Netherlands	10:14.6	0
22	Frederick Weber	United States	10:19.2	0
23	Herbert Bramfeldt	Germany	10:21.8	0
24	Jan Scheere	Belgium	10:25.6	0
25	Aaro Kiviperä	Finland	10:46.2	0
26	Guilherme Catramby Filho	Brazil	11:07.8	1.0
27	Rezső von Bartha	Hungary	9:33.9	3.0
28	Béchir Bouazzat	France	9:56.0	3.0
29	Percy Legard	Great Britain	10:13.9	3.0
30	Archibald Jack	Great Britain	10:14.9	3.0
31	Hermann Lemp	Germany	9:12.3	6.0
32	Franco Orgera	Italy	10:02.9	6.0
33	Georg von Boisman	Sweden	9:51.7	9.0
34	Alfred Guth	Austria	11:37.4	15.5
35	Rui Duarte	Brazil	10:57.5	18.0
36	Lajos von Sipeki-von Balás	Hungary	11:51.6	28.5
37	Karl Leban	Austria	11:57.0	55.5
38	Paul Lavanga	France	13:35.4	77.5
39	Ugo Ceccarelli	Italy	11:34.3	82.0
40	André Chrétien	France	15:46.4	155.0
41	Anísio da Rocha	Brazil	DNF	-
41	José Escribens	Peru	DNF	-

=== Fencing ===
Each athlete participated in a round-robin épée tournament. Each match lasted one minute, and the first athlete to score a hit won.

Rank	Athlete	Country	Win-Tie-Loss	Points
1	Frederick Weber	United States	26-3-11	27.5
1	Édouard Écuyer de le Court	Belgium	23-9-8	27.5
1	Hermann Lemp	Germany	25-5-10	27.5
4	Gotthardt Handrick	Germany	25-4-11	27.0
5	Jan Scheere	Belgium	22-7-11	25.5
5	Sven Thofelt	Sweden	23-5-12	25.5
7	André Chrétien	France	22-5-13	24.5
8	Alfred Starbird	United States	20-7-13	23.5
8	Franco Orgera	Italy	22-3-15	23.5
10	Charles Leonard	United States	22-2-16	23.0
11	Raoul Mollet	Belgium	17-11-12	22.5
11	Béchir Bouazzat	France	18-9-13	22.5
11	Nándor von Orbán	Hungary	19-7-14	22.5
11	Rezső von Bartha	Hungary	21-3-16	22.5
15	Silvano Abba	Italy	17-9-14	21.5
15	Georg von Boisman	Sweden	20-3-17	21.5
17	Karl Wyss	Switzerland	16-10-14	21.0
17	Luis Casíllas	Mexico	19-4-17	21.0
19	Lauri Kettunen	Finland	18-5-17	20.5
20	Ugo Ceccarelli	Italy	17-6-17	20.0
20	Alexander Jonkheer van Geen	Netherlands	17-6-17	20.0
22	Ebbe Gyllenstierna	Sweden	17-5-18	19.5
22	Lajos von Sipeki-von Balás	Hungary	17-5-18	19.5
24	Paul Lavanga	France	17-5-19	19.0
24	Johannes van der Horst	Netherlands	18-2-20	19.0
26	Alexandros Baltatzis-Mavrokorlatis	Greece	14-9-17	18.5
26	Jeffrey MacDougall	Great Britain	15-7-18	18.5
26	Anísio da Rocha	Brazil	17-3-20	18.5
29	Humberto Anguiano	Mexico	15-6-19	18.0
29	Percy Legard	Great Britain	16-4-20	18.0
31	Ukko Hietala	Finland	13-9-18	17.5
31	Guilherme Catramby Filho	Brazil	14-7-19	17.5
33	Herbert Bramfeldt	Germany	12-9-19	16.5
34	Alfred Guth	Austria	11-10-19	16.0
34	Josephus Serré	Netherlands	12-8-20	16.0
36	Rui Duarte	Brazil	14-3-23	15.5
37	Hans Baumann	Switzerland	13-2-25	14.0
38	Willy Grundbacher	Switzerland	10-6-24	13.0
39	Karl Leban	Austria	8-9-23	12.5
40	Archibald Jack	Great Britain	7-7-26	10.5
41	Aaro Kiviperä	Finland	7-4-29	9.0

=== Shooting ===
Each athlete shot 20 shots with a rapid-fire pistol.

Rank	Athlete	Country	Targets Hit	Points
1	Charles Leonard	United States	20	200
2	Frederick Weber	United States	20	194
3	Rezső von Bartha	Hungary	20	192
3	Gotthardt Handrick	Germany	20	192
5	Ugo Ceccarelli	Italy	20	190
5	Sven Thofelt	Sweden	20	190
7	Willy Grundbacher	Switzerland	20	189
7	André Chrétien	France	20	189
7	Georg von Boisman	Sweden	20	189
10	Silvano Abba	Italy	20	188
10	Hermann Lemp	Germany	20	188
10	Lauri Kettunen	Finland	20	188
13	Archibald Jack	Great Britain	20	187
13	Johannes van der Horst	Netherlands	20	187
13	Alexander Jonkheer van Geen	Netherlands	20	187
16	Aaro Kiviperä	Finland	20	185
17	Lajos von Sipeki-von Balás	Hungary	20	183
17	Karl Leban	Austria	20	183
17	Herbert Bramfeldt	Germany	20	183
17	Édouard Écuyer de le Court	Belgium	20	183
21	Nándor von Orbán	Hungary	20	182
22	Alexandros Baltatzis-Mavrokorlatis	Greece	20	181
22	Alfred Starbird	United States	20	181
24	Percy Legard	Great Britain	20	180
25	Karl Wyss	Switzerland	20	177
25	Humberto Anguiano	Mexico	20	177
27	Franco Orgera	Italy	19	175
28	Jeffrey MacDougall	Great Britain	19	173
29	Béchir Bouazzat	France	19	171
30	Josephus Serré	Netherlands	19	169
30	Jan Scheere	Belgium	19	169
32	Raoul Mollet	Belgium	19	168
33	Rui Duarte	Brazil	19	167
34	Ukko Hietala	Finland	19	165
35	Luis Casíllas	Mexico	19	162
36	Paul Lavanga	France	18	164
37	Hans Baumann	Switzerland	18	157
37	Guilherme Catramby Filho	Brazil	18	157
39	Ebbe Gyllenstierna	Sweden	18	153
40	Anísio da Rocha	Brazil	17	146
41	Alfred Guth	Austria	17	134

=== Swimming ===
Each athlete raced in a 300-meter freestyle event.

Rank	Athlete	Country	Time
1	Hermann Lemp	Germany	4:15.2
2	Nándor von Orbán	Hungary	4:23.4
3	Sven Thofelt	Sweden	4:34.9
4	Herbert Bramfeldt	Germany	4:36.0
5	Alfred Guth	Austria	4:39.2
6	Charles Leonard	United States	4:40.9
7	Ebbe Gyllenstierna	Sweden	4:51.2
8	Aaro Kiviperä	Finland	4:51.5
9	Gotthardt Handrick	Germany	4:51.9
10	Lajos von Sipeki-von Balás	Hungary	4:59.0
11	Archibald Jack	Great Britain	5:00.8
12	Rezső von Bartha	Hungary	5:04.3
13	Jeffrey MacDougall	Great Britain	5:07.3
14	Silvano Abba	Italy	5:13.8
15	Franco Orgera	Italy	5:15.4
16	Georg von Boisman	Sweden	5:19.0
17	Ugo Ceccarelli	Italy	5:20.2
18	Percy Legard	Great Britain	5:20.9
19	Béchir Bouazzat	France	5:23.3
20	Alfred Starbird	United States	5:28.5
21	Josephus Serré	Netherlands	5:29.5
22	Karl Leban	Austria	5:30.2
23	Rui Duarte	Brazil	5:30.3
24	Karl Wyss	Switzerland	5:31.5
25	Johannes van der Horst	Netherlands	5:32.8
26	Alexander Jonkheer van Geen	Netherlands	5:40.5
27	Ukko Hietala	Finland	5:40.7
28	Guilherme Catramby Filho	Brazil	5:40.9
29	Édouard Écuyer de le Court	Belgium	5:41.8
30	André Chrétien	France	5:43.1
31	Willy Grundbacher	Switzerland	5:52.2
32	Humberto Anguiano	Mexico	5:53.0
33	Lauri Kettunen	Finland	6:01.6
34	Frederick Weber	United States	6:04.1
35	Paul Lavanga	France	6:05.0
36	Jan Scheere	Belgium	6:36.2
37	Luis Casíllas	Mexico	6:58.6
38	Raoul Mollet	Belgium	7:22.2
39	Anísio da Rocha	Brazil	7:22.5
-	Hans Baumann	Switzerland	DNF

=== Running ===
Each athlete ran a 4000-meter race.

Rank	Athlete	Country	Time
1	Karl Leban	Austria	13:17.4
2	Ukko Hietala	Finland	13:25.3
3	Karl Wyss	Switzerland	13:47.7
4	Percy Legard	Great Britain	13:51.1
5	Silvano Abba	Italy	14:11.2
6	Jeffrey MacDougall	Great Britain	14:15.3
7	Charles Leonard	United States	14:15.8
7	Alfred Starbird	United States	14:15.8
9	Georg von Boisman	Sweden	14:18.2
10	Herbert Bramfeldt	Germany	14:25.0
11	Josephus Serré	Netherlands	14:30.6
12	Ugo Ceccarelli	Italy	14:36.2
13	Humberto Anguiano	Mexico	14:40.4
14	Gotthardt Handrick	Germany	14:41.7
15	Ebbe Gyllenstierna	Sweden	14:42.4
16	Nándor von Orbán	Hungary	14:46.1
17	Lauri Kettunen	Finland	14:46.3
18	Aaro Kiviperä	Finland	14:47.1
19	Alfred Guth	Austria	14:51.1
20	Frederick Weber	United States	14:56.2
21	Hermann Lemp	Germany	15:01.7
22	Rezső von Bartha	Hungary	15:09.4
23	Lajos von Sipeki-von Balás	Hungary	15:11.5
24	Sven Thofelt	Sweden	15:16.2
25	Archibald Jack	Great Britain	15:20.7
26	André Chrétien	France	15:20.9
27	Franco Orgera	Italy	15:27.8
28	Alexander Jonkheer van Geen	Netherlands	15:34.1
29	Béchir Bouazzat	France	15:36.6
30	Anísio da Rocha	Brazil	15:40.7
31	Raoul Mollet	Belgium	15:45.5
32	Willy Grundbacher	Switzerland	15:46.5
33	Rui Duarte	Brazil	15:52.0
34	Paul Lavanga	France	16:01.2
35	Johannes van der Horst	Netherlands	16:08.4
36	Guilherme Catramby Filho	Brazil	16:51.7
37	Édouard Écuyer de le Court	Belgium	17:23.6
38	Jan Scheere	Belgium	18:13.1
39	Luis Casíllas	Mexico	19:20.9

=== Final standings ===
Rank	Athlete	Country	Points
1st place, gold medalist(s)	Gotthardt Handrick	Germany	31.5
2nd place, silver medalist(s)	Charles Leonard	United States	39.5
3rd place, bronze medalist(s)	Silvano Abba	Italy	45.5
4	Sven Thofelt	Sweden	47.0
5	Nándor von Orbán	Hungary	55.5
6	Hermann Lemp	Germany	67.5
7	Alfred Starbird	United States	67.5
8	Rezső von Bartha	Hungary	76.5
9	Frederick Weber	United States	79.0
10	Georg von Boisman	Sweden	82.5
11	Karl Wyss	Switzerland	83.5
12	Herbert Bramfeldt	Germany	89.0
13	Jeffrey MacDougall	Great Britain	91.0
14	Lauri Kettunen	Finland	92.0
15	Ugo Ceccarelli	Italy	93.5
16	Ebbe Gyllenstierna	Sweden	93.5
17	Édouard Écuyer de le Court	Belgium	94.5
18	Alexander Jonkheer van Geen	Netherlands	101.5
19	Percy Legard	Great Britain	104.5
20	Aaro Kiviperä	Finland	108.0
21	Lajos von Sipeki-von Balás	Hungary	108.5
22	Franco Orgera	Italy	109.5
23	Ukko Hietala	Finland	110.5
24	André Chrétien	France	111.0
25	Raoul Mollet	Belgium	116.0
26	Karl Leban	Austria	117.0
27	Josephus Serré	Netherlands	117.5
27	Béchir Bouazzat	France	117.5
27	Johannes van der Horst	Netherlands	117.5
30	Humberto Anguiano	Mexico	118.5
31	Archibald Jack	Great Britain	119.0
32	Willy Grundbacher	Switzerland	121.0
33	Alfred Guth	Austria	133.5
34	Jan Scheere	Belgium	134.5
34	Luis Casíllas	Mexico	134.5
36	Guilherme Catramby Filho	Brazil	159.5
37	Rui Duarte	Brazil	160.0
38	Paul Lavanga	France	167.5
39	Anísio da Rocha	Brazil	177.5
-	Hans Baumann	Switzerland	DNF
-	Alexandros Baltatzis-Mavrokorlatis	Greece	DNF
-	José Escribens	Peru	DNF
