= Belgium at the 1936 Summer Olympics =

- IOC code: BEL
- NOC: Belgian Olympic Committee

in Berlin
- Competitors: 150 (145 men and 5 women) in 15 sports
- Flag bearer: Édouard Écuyer de le Court
- Medals Ranked 28th: Gold 0 Silver 0 Bronze 2 Total 2

Summer Olympics appearances (overview)
- 1900; 1904; 1908; 1912; 1920; 1924; 1928; 1932; 1936; 1948; 1952; 1956; 1960; 1964; 1968; 1972; 1976; 1980; 1984; 1988; 1992; 1996; 2000; 2004; 2008; 2012; 2016; 2020; 2024

Other related appearances
- 1906 Intercalated Games

Belgium competed at the 1936 Summer Olympics in Berlin, Germany. 150 competitors, 145 men and 5 women, participated in 72 events in 15 sports.

== Medalists ==
=== Bronze ===
- Auguste Garrebeek, Armand Putzeys, and François Vandermotte — Cycling, Men's Team Road Race
- Henri Disy, Pierre Coppieters, Albert Castelyns, Gérard Blitz, Fernand Isselé, Joseph De Combe, Henri Stoelen, Henri De Pauw and Edmond Michiels — Water polo, Men's Team Competition

== Athletics ==
Key

- Note–Ranks given for track events are within the athlete's heat only
- Q = Qualified for the next round
- q = Qualified for the next round as a fastest loser

Men
Track & road events

Athlete	Event	Heat		Quarterfinal		Semifinal		Final	
Athlete	Event	Result	Rank	Result	Rank	Result	Rank	Result	Rank
Dieudonné Devrindt	100 m	Unknown	4	Did not advance					
Dieudonné Devrindt	200 m	Unknown	4	Did not advance					
Jean Verhaert	400 m	50.7	5	Did not advance					
Jean Verhaert	800 m	1:54.3	3 Q	—N/a		Unknown	8	Did not advance	
René Geeraert	1500 m	—N/a				Unknown	7	Did not advance	
Joseph Mostert	1500 m	—N/a				3:56.6	4	Did not advance	
Oscar Van Rumst	5000 m	Unknown	12	—N/a				Did not advance	
Pierre Bajart	10,000 m	—N/a							
Juul Bosmans	110 m hurdles	Unknown	5	—N/a		Did not advance			
Juul Bosmans	400 m hurdles	53.8	2 Q	—N/a		53.4	4	Did not advance	
Oscar Van Rumst	3000 m steeple	10:05.0	6	—N/a				Did not advance	
Felix Meskens	Marathon	—N/a						2:51:19.0	20
Robert Nevens	Marathon	—N/a						2:55:51.0	24
Jean Chapelle	Marathon	—N/a						DNS	

Field events

Athlete	Event	Qualification		Final	
Athlete	Event	Result	Rank	Result	Rank
Émile Binet	Long jump	<7.15		Did not advance	

Men
Combined events – Decathlon

Athlete	Event	100m	LJ	SP	HJ	400m	110m H	DT	PV	JT	1500m	Final	Rank
Maurice Boulanger	Result	11.4	5.85	9.92	1.60	52.2	19.2	25.20	3.30	43.43	4:35.0	5097	17
Maurice Boulanger	Points	735	522	615	563	755	444	324	613	471	581	5097	17
Émile Binet	Result	12.4	6.55	8.26	1.65	55.1	16.0	26.87	NM	—N/a		Did not finish	
Émile Binet	Points	517	688	311	616	622	776	363	NM	—N/a		Did not finish	

Women
Field events

Athlete	Event	Qualification		Final	
Athlete	Event	Result	Rank	Result	Rank
Catherine Stevens	High jump	—N/a		1.40	14
Jeanne Van Kesteren	Javelin throw	—N/a		33.13	11

== Cycling ==
Eight cyclists, all male, represented Belgium in 1936.

Individual road race

- Auguste Garrebeek
- Armand Putzeyse
- Jean-François Van Der Motte
- Jef Lowagie

Team road race

- Auguste Garrebeek
- Armand Putzeyse
- Jean-François Van Der Motte
- Jef Lowagie

Sprint

- Henri Collard

Time trial

- Frans Cools

Tandem

- Frans Cools
- Roger Pirotte

Team pursuit

- Jean Alexandre
- Frans Cools
- Auguste Garrebeek
- Armand Putzeyse

== Fencing ==
20 fencers, 17 men and 3 women, represented Belgium in 1936.

Men's foil

- Raymond Bru
- Georges de Bourguignon
- Paul Valcke

Men's team foil

- Georges de Bourguignon, André Van De Werve De Vorsselaer, Henri Paternóster, Raymond Bru, Jean Heeremans, Paul Valcke

Men's épée

- Charles Debeur
- Raymond Stasse
- Hervé du Monceau de Bergendael

Men's team épée

- Raymond Stasse, Robert T'Sas, Charles Debeur, Hervé du Monceau de Bergendael, Jean Plumier, Marcel Heim

Men's sabre

- Robert Van Den Neucker
- Eugène Laermans
- Georges Heywaert

Men's team sabre

- Eugène Laermans, Georges Heywaert, Robert Van Den Neucker, Henri Brasseur, Hubert Van Nerom

Women's foil

- Jenny Addams
- Madeleine Scrève
- Adèle Christiaens

== Modern pentathlon ==
Three male pentathletes represented Belgium in 1936.

- Édouard Écuyer de le Court
- Raoul Mollet
- Jan Scheere

== Rowing ==
Belgium had seven rowers participate in two out of seven rowing events in 1936.

Men's coxless pair

- Frans Thissen
- Edmond Van Herck

Men's coxed four

- René Vingerhoet
- Paul Siebels
- Willy Collet
- Jean De Rode
- Harry Peeters (cox)

== Shooting ==
Three shooters represented Belgium in 1936.

25 m rapid fire pistol

- Marcel Lafortune
- François Lafortune

50 m pistol

- Marcel Lafortune
- Paul Van Asbroeck
- François Lafortune

50 m rifle, prone

- François Lafortune
- Paul Van Asbroeck
- Marcel Lafortune
