= Greece at the 1936 Summer Olympics =

- IOC code: GRE
- NOC: Committee of the Olympic Games

in Berlin Germany
- Competitors: 41 (40 men and 1 woman) in 7 sports
- Flag bearer: Ioannis Skiadas
- Medals: Gold 0 Silver 0 Bronze 0 Total 0

Summer Olympics appearances (overview)
- 1896; 1900; 1904; 1908; 1912; 1920; 1924; 1928; 1932; 1936; 1948; 1952; 1956; 1960; 1964; 1968; 1972; 1976; 1980; 1984; 1988; 1992; 1996; 2000; 2004; 2008; 2012; 2016; 2020; 2024

Other related appearances
- 1906 Intercalated Games

Greece competed at the 1936 Summer Olympics in Berlin, Germany. 41 competitors, 40 men and 1 woman, took part in 34 events in 7 sports. Greek athletes have competed in every Summer Olympic Games.

== Athletics ==
Women's 80 metres hurdles

- Domnitsa Lanitou

Men's marathon

- Stylianos Kyriakides

== Fencing ==
Eight fencers, all men, represented Greece in 1936.

Men's foil

- Nikolaos Manolesos
- Konstantinos Bembis
- Spyridon Ferentinos

Men's team foil

- Konstantinos Botasis, Spyridon Ferentinos, Konstantinos Bembis, Nikolaos Manolesos, Menelaos Psarrakis

Men's épée

- Khristos Zalokostas
- Konstantinos Bembis

Men's team épée

- Khristos Zalokostas, Konstantinos Botasis, Tryfon Triantafyllakos, Konstantinos Bembis

Men's sabre

- Nikolaos Manolesos
- Konstantinos Botasis
- Menelaos Psarrakis

Men's team sabre

- Nikolaos Manolesos, Nikolaos Paparrodou, Konstantinos Botasis, Menelaos Psarrakis

== Modern pentathlon ==
One male pentathlete represented Greece in 1936.

- Alexandros Baltatzis-Mavrokorlatis

== Shooting ==
Eight shooters represented Greece in 1936.

25 m rapid fire pistol

- Angelos Papadimas
- Christos Zalokostas
- Dimitrios Stathis

50 m pistol

- Georgios Stathis
- Georgios Kontogiannis

50 m rifle, prone

- Konstantinos Loudaros
- Athanasios Aravositas
- Georgios Vikhos

== Swimming ==
Men

Ranks given are within the heat.

Athlete	Event	Heat		Semifinal		Final	
Athlete	Event	Time	Rank	Time	Rank	Time	Rank
Rikhardos Brousalis	100 m freestyle	1:07.5	6	Did not advance			
Spyridon Mavrogiorgos	100 m freestyle	1:08.2	6	Did not advance			
Emmanouil Mallidis	100 m backstroke	1:21.5	5	Did not advance			
Rikhardos Brousalis; Spyridon Mavrogiorgos; Panagiotis Provatopoulos; Angelos Vlakhos	4 × 200 m freestyle relay	—N/a		10:51.0	6	Did not advance	
