= La Guardia =

La Guardia (Italian and Spanish, 'The Guard') or variants may refer to:

== Places ==
=== New York, United States ===
- LaGuardia Airport
- Fiorello H. LaGuardia High School
- LaGuardia Community College

=== South America ===
- La Guardia, Bolivia
- La Guardia, Catamarca, Argentina
- La Guardia, Nueva Esparta, Venezuela

=== Spain ===
- La Guardia, Spain, a municipality in Toledo
- La Guardia, Pontevedra, a municipality also known as A Guarda
- La Guardia de Jaén, a small city
- Laguardia, Álava, a town and municipality
- Campo de La Guardia, a wine region
- Roc de la Guàrdia (Balenyà), a mountain in Catalonia

== People ==
=== La Guardia ===
- Fiorello La Guardia (1882–1947), American politician, mayor of New York City 1934–1945
- Gemma La Guardia Gluck (1881–1962), American writer, sister of Fiorello La Guardia

=== de la Guardia ===
- Alfredo de la Guardia (fl. 1940s), Argentine screenwriter
- Bernardo de la Guardia (1900-1970), Costa Rican fencer
- Ernesto de la Guardia (1904–1983), former president of Panama
- Miguel de La Guardia, Spanish chemist
- Ponç de la Guàrdia (1154–1188), Catalan knight
- Reverter de La Guardia (died 1142 or 1144), Catalan adventurer
- Ricardo Adolfo de la Guardia Arango (1899–1969), former president of Panama
- Tony de la Guardia (1939–1989), Cuban administrator

== Other uses ==
- La Guardia (band), a Spanish pop-rock band
- Laguardia (band), American band fronted by Josh Ostrander
- LaGuardia, a 2019 graphic novel

== See also ==
- Guard (disambiguation)
- Guarda (disambiguation)
- Guardia (disambiguation)
- Guardian (disambiguation)
- Holy Child of La Guardia, a Spanish Roman Catholic saint
