= Lafortune =

Lafortune may refer to:

- Bill LaFortune (born 1957), mayor of Tulsa, Oklahoma from 2002 to 2006
- Charles Lafortune (born 1969), Quebec, Canadian actor and television and radio personality
- David Arthur Lafortune (1848–1922), Quebec, Canada lawyer and politician
- Felicity LaFortune (born 1954), American actress and singer
- François Lafortune Sr. (1896-????), Belgian rifle shooter and Olympian
- François Lafortune Jr. (1932–2020), Belgian rifle shooter and Olympian
- Hubert Lafortune (1889–????), Belgian gymnast and Olympian
- Jeanne Lafortune, Canadian economist based in Chile
- Luc Lafortune (born 1958), Canadian lighting designer
- Marcel Lafortune (1900–????), Belgian rifle shooter and Olympian
- Robert J. LaFortune (1927–2024), American Republican politician
