= Bernardo de la Guardia =

Costa Rican fencer (1900–1970)

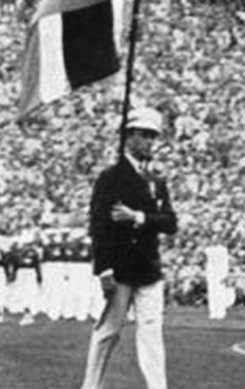
- de la Guardia at the 1936 Summer Olympics opening ceremony

Personal information
- Full name: Bernardo de los Ángeles de la Guardia y Tinoco
- Born: 14 April 1900 San José, Costa Rica
- Died: 21 February 1970 (aged 69) Red Bank, New Jersey, United States

Sport
- Sport: Fencing

Bernardo de los Ángeles de la Guardia y Tinoco (14 April 1900 – 21 February 1970) was a Costa Rican fencer. As a fencer, he competed at the 1936 Summer Olympics as part of the Costa Rican delegation. He was the first athlete to compete for the nation at an Olympic Games.

He competed in the first round of the men's sabre event. He lost six matches and won one, not advancing to the quarterfinals. At the same games, he was a judge for the men's team sabre.

== Biography ==
Bernardo de los Ángeles de la Guardia y Tinoco was born on 14 April 1900 in San José, Costa Rica, before moving to the United States at a very young age.

De la Guardia was selected to represent Costa Rica at the 1936 Summer Olympics. This marked the first time Costa Rica had participated at any edition of the games, making de la Guardia the first Costa Rican Olympian. He competed in the men's sabre event in fencing. He was also designated as the flag bearer for the nation during the opening ceremony.

He competed at the Haus des Deutschen Sports on 14 October for the first round. He competed as part of the seventh pool and fenced against seven other fencers. De la Guardia first competed against John Huffman of the United States and lost the match by just one point, 5–4. He then competed against Hervarth Frass von Friedenfeldt of Czechoslovakia and again lost, losing 5–2.

De la Guardia's following match was against José Julián de la Fuente of Uruguay. In the bout, he scored zero touches and lost 5–0. His next opponent was Richard Wahl of Germany, where de la Guardia lost again, losing 5–2. Don Collinge of Canada was his next opponent; de la Guardia nearly won, losing by one point, 5–4. His last match was against Konstantinos Botasis of Greece, there he finally won a match with a score of 3–5. He did not contest his match with Erik Hammer Sørensen of Denmark and did not advance to the quarterfinals. At the same games, he was also a judge for the quarterfinal round of United States and Sweden at the men's team sabre.

He died on 21 February 1970 in Red Bank, New Jersey, United States.
