= Heeremans =

Heeremans is a Dutch surname. Notable people with the surname include:

- Jean Heeremans (1914–1970), Belgian fencer
- Karl Heeremans (1937–2010), Belgian artist
- Thomas Heeremans (1641–1694), Dutch painter and art dealer
