= Szatmári =

Szatmári, Szathmári, Szatmáry or Szathmáry is a Hungarian-language toponymic surname literally meaning "one from Szatmár (Satu Mare)". Notable people with this surname include:

== Szatmári/Szatmari ==
- Ágnes Szatmári (born 1987), Romanian tennis player
- András Szatmári (born 1993), Hungarian sabre fencer
- Csaba Szatmári, multiple people
- Elemér Szatmári (1926–1971), Hungarian swimmer
- George Szatmári (1457–1524), prelate in the Kingdom of Hungary
- István Szatmári (born 1997), Hungarian football player
- Lajos Szatmári (born 1944), former Romanian football player of Hungarian ethnicity
- László Szatmári (born 1977), Hungarian motorcycle speedway rider
- Lóránd Szatmári (born 1988), Romanian-born Hungarian football player
- Peter Szatmari (born 1950), Canadian researcher of autism and Asperger syndrome
- Peter Szatmari (geologist), Hungarian geologist

== Szathmári/Szathmari ==
- Carol Szathmari (1812–1887), Austro-Hungarian-born painter, lithographer and photographer
- János Szathmári (born 1969), Hungarian handball goalkeeper
- Sándor Szathmári (1897–1974), Hungarian writer, mechanical engineer and Esperantist

== See also ==
- Szatmary
- Szathmary
