= François Lafortune =

François Lafortune may refer to:

- François Lafortune Sr. (1896–after 1960), Belgian rifle shooter and Olympian
- François Lafortune Jr. (1932–2020), Belgian rifle shooter and Olympian
