= Charles Leonard (athlete) =

American pentathlete and US Army general (1913–2006)

Charles F. Leonard Jr.
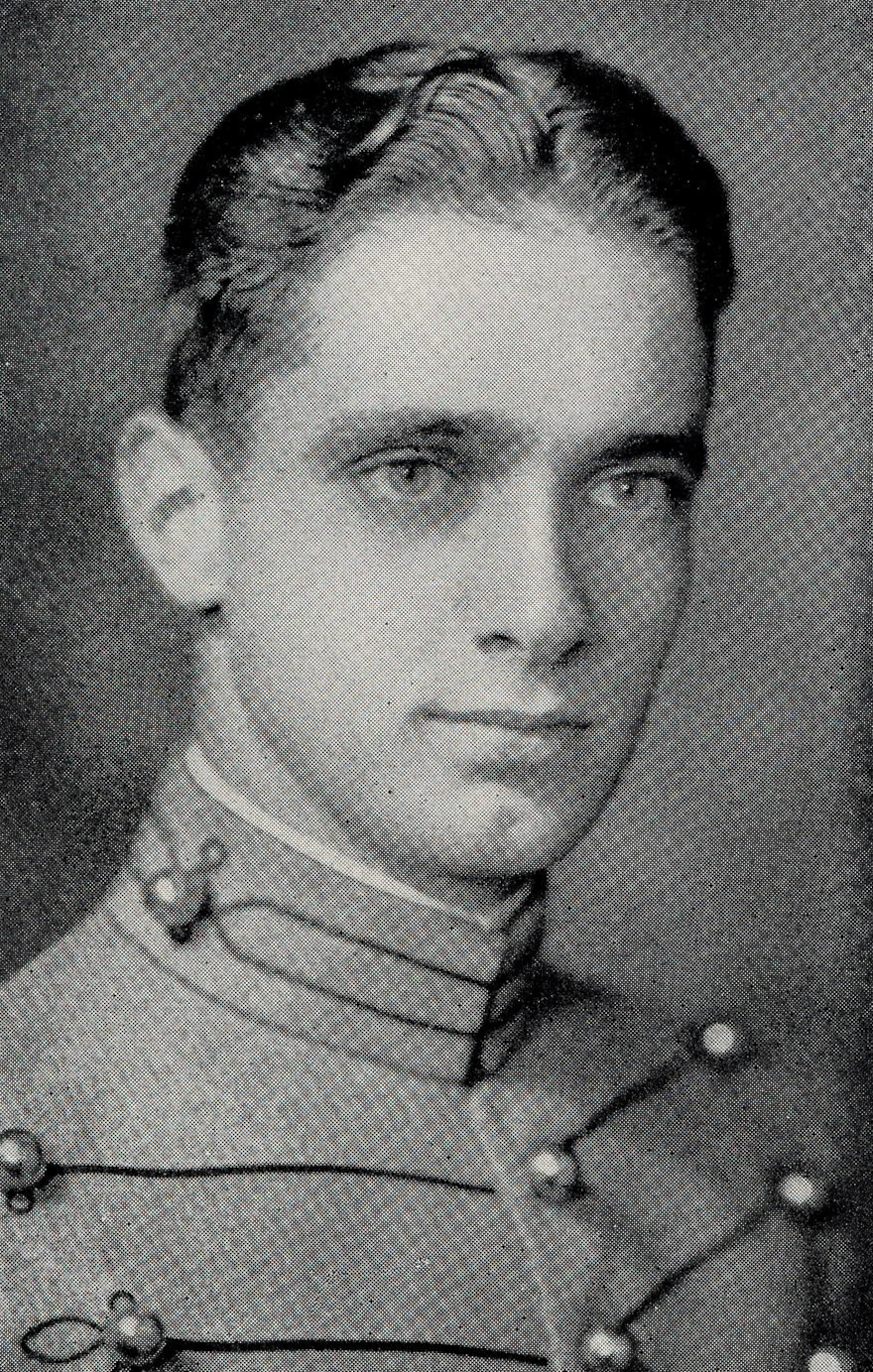
- Born: February 23, 1913; Fort Snelling, Minnesota, U.S.
- Died: February 18, 2006 (aged 92)
- Burial place: Arlington National Cemetery
- Relatives: William N. Leonard (brother)
- Military career
- Allegiance: United States
- Branch: United States Army
- Service years: 1935–1967
- Rank: Major General
- Commands: X Corps; 1st Cavalry Division; 15th Infantry Regiment; 27th Infantry Regiment
- Conflicts: World War II; Korean War
- Awards: Army Distinguished Service Medal; Legion of Merit

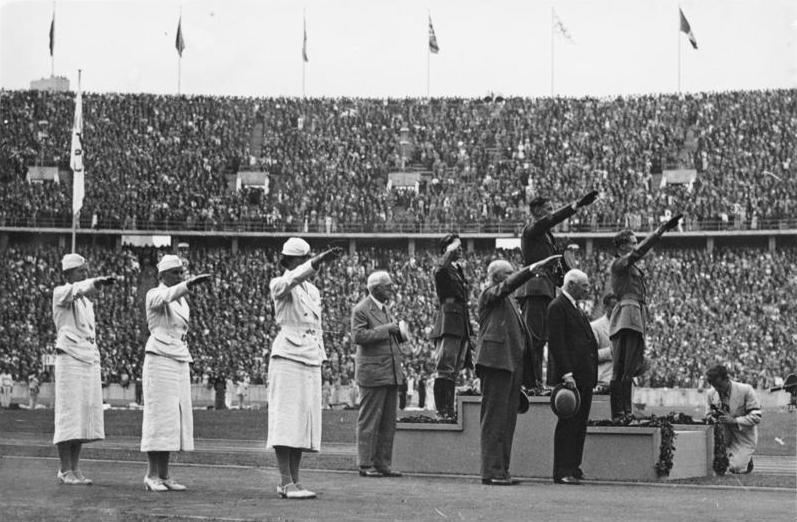
- Medal presentation at the 1936 Berlin Olympic games, Charles Leonard-USA (2nd place), Gotthard Handrick-Germany (1st place), Silvano Abbà-Italy (3rd place)

Medal record

Men's modern pentathlon

Representing the United States

Olympic Games
Silver medal – second place	1936 Berlin	Individual

Charles Frederick Leonard Jr. (February 23, 1913 – February 18, 2006) was an American pentathlete and a major general in the United States Army.

Leonard won the silver medal in the 1936 Olympic Pentathlon.

Charles Leonard's brother, William N. Leonard (1916–2005), was a World War II fighter ace. They were buried together in Arlington National Cemetery.
