= Van Wieringen =

Van Wieringen is a surname. Notable people with the surname include:

- Cornelis Claesz van Wieringen (c. 1576–1633), Dutch Golden Age painter
- Dominique Van Wieringen (born 1995), Canadian racing driver
- Pieter van Wieringen (1903–1997), Dutch fencer
