= Schriever =

Schriever may refer to:

- Schriever, Louisiana, census-designated place named for John G. Schriever
  - Schriever (Amtrak station)
- Schriever Air Force Base, a US military base near Colorado Springs, Colorado, named after General Schriever
- Schriever (surname)

== See also ==
- Schriever-Habermohl
