= Franco Orgera =

Italian modern pentathlete (1908–1979)

Personal information
- Born: 13 January 1908
- Died: 9 December 1979 (aged 71)

Sport
- Sport: Modern pentathlon

Franco Orgera (13 January 1908 – 9 December 1979) was an Italian modern pentathlete. He competed at the 1936 Summer Olympics, finishing 22nd in the individual event. His best performance was in the discipline of Fencing, where he finished 8th with 23.5 points.

He started his military career in 1923 at the Nunziatella Military School of Naples and subsequently he entered the Army Academy and became a lieutenant of Granatieri di Sardegna.

Along with his team-mates, Silvano Abbà and Ugo Ceccarelli, Orgera joined the fascist volunteer corps (Freiwilligenkorps) and took part in the Spanish Civil War. He became a lieutenant in the Frecce Nere ("Black Arrows") brigade, and wrote lyrics for the brigade song "Inno della Brigata" to the tune of the fascist marching song "Faccetta Nera" by Mario Ruccione.
