= Samuel Stewart =

Samuel Stewart may refer to:

- Samuel Stewart (boxer) (1895–1950), American Olympic boxer
- Samuel Stewart (fencer) (1912–1950), American Olympic fencer
- Samuel Alexander Stewart, Irish botanist and geologist
- Samuel Swaim Stewart banjo player, publisher, manufacturer
- Sam V. Stewart (1872–1939), sixth Governor of Montana
- Sam Stewart (rugby league), New Zealand rugby league footballer
- Sam Stewart (rugby union), New Zealand rugby union player

== See also ==
- Sammy Stewart (disambiguation)
- Samuel Steward (1909–1993), novelist and tattoo artist
