= Hans Baumann (pentathlete) =

Swiss modern pentathlete

Personal information
- Born: 14 July 1905

Sport
- Sport: Modern pentathlon

Hans Baumann (born 14 July 1905, date of death unknown) was a Swiss modern pentathlete who competed at the 1936 Summer Olympics, and was one of three competitors among 42 who did not finish the competition, alongside Alexandros Baltatzis-Mavrokorlatis of Greece and José Escribens of Peru. In the individual events, he was ranked seventh in riding and thirty-seventh in fencing and shooting prior to dropping out in the swimming event.
