= Orgera =

Orgera is a surname. Notable people with the surname include:

- Franco Orgera (1908–1979), Italian modern pentathlete
- Giovanni Orgera (1894–1967), Italian politician
