= Rajczy =

Rajczy is a surname. Notable people with the surname include:

- Imre Rajczy (1911–1978), Hungarian fencer
- Lajos Rajczy (1914–1957), Hungarian actor
