= Lauri Kettunen =

Lauri Kettunen may refer to:

- Lauri Kettunen (linguist) (1885–1963), Finnish linguist
- Lauri Kettunen (fencer) (1905–1941), Finnish fencer
