= Plumier =

Plumier is a surname. Notable people with the surname include:

- Charles Plumier (1646–1704), French botanist
- Jean Plumier (1909–?), Belgian fencer
- Pierre-Denis Plumier (1688–1721), Flemish sculptor

== See also ==
- Plumer
