= Sammy Stewart (disambiguation) =

Sammy Stewart (born 1954) is an American baseball pitcher (Baltimore Orioles)

Sammy Stewart may also refer to:

- Sammy Stewart (boxer) (born 1969), Liberian boxer
- Sammy Stewart (footballer, born 1920) (1920–1995), Scottish footballer (East Fife FC)
- Sammy Stewart (footballer, born 1991), Northern Irish footballer (Aberdeen FC)

== See also ==
- Samuel Stewart (disambiguation)
