= William N. Leonard =

United States Navy pilot and admiral (1916–2005)

- Lieutenant William Leonard during World War II
- Born: January 12, 1916; Douglas, Arizona
- Died: August 21, 2005 (aged 89); Chester, Virginia
- Burial place: Arlington National Cemetery
- Relatives: Charles F. Leonard Jr. (brother)
- Military career
- Allegiance: United States
- Branch: United States Navy
- Service years: 1938–1971
- Rank: Rear Admiral
- Commands: Naval Safety Center; USS Ranger; USS Salamonie; VF-171
- Conflicts: World War II
- Awards: Navy Cross (2); Legion of Merit (4); Distinguished Flying Cross; Bronze Star Medal; Air Medal (6)

William Nicholas Leonard (January 12, 1916 – August 21, 2005) was an American aviator, a flying ace of World War II, and a rear admiral in the United States Navy.

Leonard was born in Douglas, Arizona, the son of United States Army Colonel Charles F. Leonard and his wife Hannah M. Leonard.

Leonard graduated from the United States Naval Academy in 1938 and was designated Naval Aviator #6953 in 1940. He fought in the Pacific battles of the Coral Sea, Midway and the Solomons. He flew 170 combat missions and credited with destroying six Japanese aircraft in aerial combat, including two Mitsubishi F1M2 "Pete" seaplanes, two Nakajima B6N2 "Jill" torpedo bombers, and two Mitsubishi A6M2 "Zeke" (Zero) fighters, achieving status of ace. Awarded the Navy Cross at both Midway and Coral Sea, Leonard also was awarded the Legion of Merit (four times), the Distinguished Flying Cross, the Air Medal (six times), and Bronze Star.

Barrett Tillman, World War II aviation historian, noted, "[Leonard] is a 'national treasure' because he is so generous with his time and knowledge, records, and photos."

After the war, Leonard became a test pilot, and served as commanding officer of Fighter Squadron 17A (VF-17A, soon after redesignated VF-171), the first Navy jet squadron to operate from an aircraft carrier flying the McDonnell FH-1 Phantom. Rising through the ranks, Leonard's subsequent commands included Commander Air Group (CAG) Seventeen; Commander, VX-5; Captain, USS Salamonie (AO 26); Captain, USS Ranger (CV 61); Commander, Carrier Division 14, breaking his flag aboard USS Wasp (CV 18); and Commander, Naval Safety Center. Promoted to Rear Admiral in 1965, Leonard served on eighteen different aircraft carriers by the time he retired in 1971.

Two of Leonard's brothers also became high-ranking officers: Army Major General Charles F. Leonard, Jr. and Army Air Forces Lieutenant Colonel John Wallis Leonard, who was killed in action in World War II. William Leonard, his father and two brothers are all interred in Arlington National Cemetery.
