= Liedekerke =

- Municipality
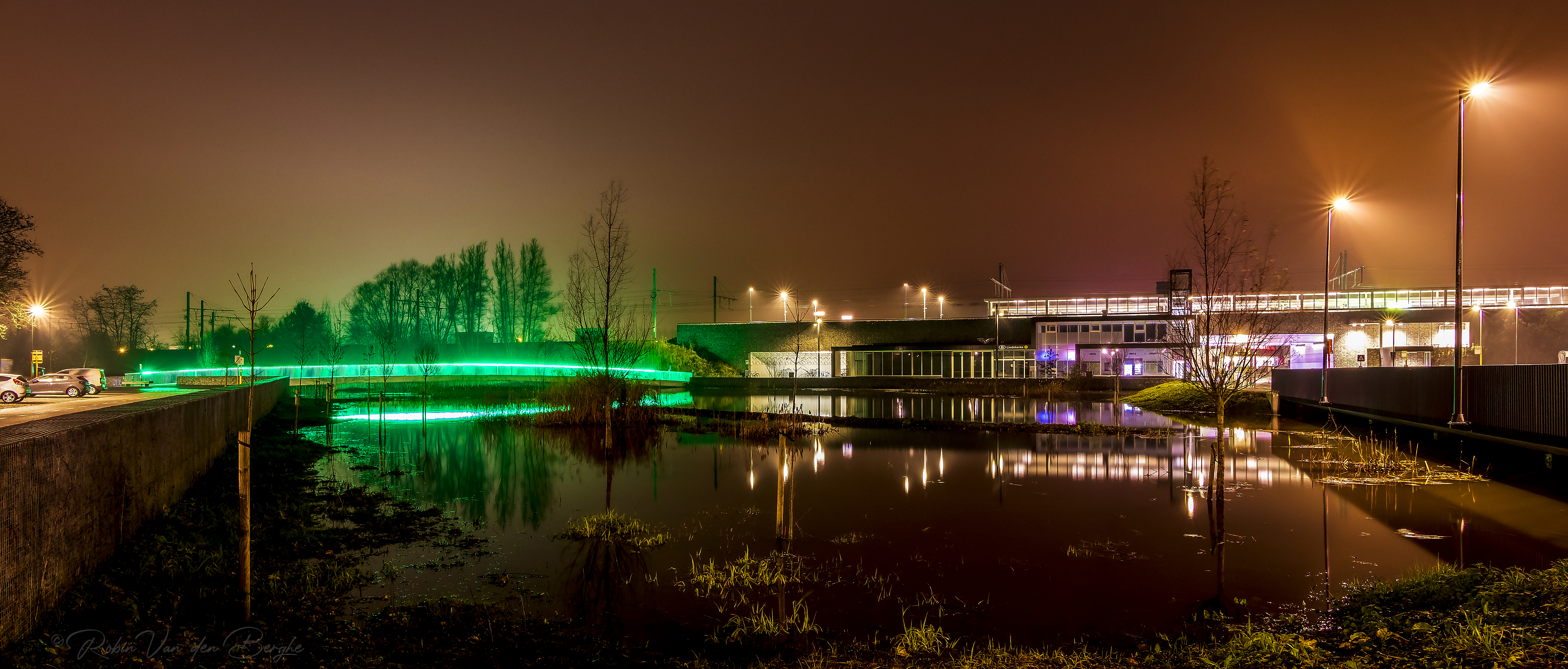

- Flag Coat of arms

- Location of Liedekerke in Flemish Brabant
- Interactive map of Liedekerke
- Location in Belgium
- Coordinates: 50°52′N 04°05′E
- Country: Belgium
- Community: Flemish Community
- Region: Flemish Region
- Province: Flemish Brabant
- Arrondissement: Halle-Vilvoorde

Government
  - Mayor: Steven Van Linthout (CD&V)
  - Governing parties: CD&V, Vooruit, OpenVld

Area
  - Total: 10.17 km^{2} (3.93 sq mi)

Population (2018-01-01)
  - Total: 13,188
  - Density: 1,297/km^{2} (3,359/sq mi)
- Postal codes: 1770
- NIS code: 23044
- Area codes: 053, 054
- Website: www.liedekerke.be

Liedekerke (Dutch pronunciation: [ˈlidəkɛrkə]) is a municipality located in the Belgian province of Flemish Brabant. On January 1, 2006, Liedekerke had a total population of 11,920. It is also situated in the Pajottenland.The total area is 10.08 km^{2} which results in a population density of 1,183 inhabitants per km^{2}. Liedekerke means "church on the little hill."

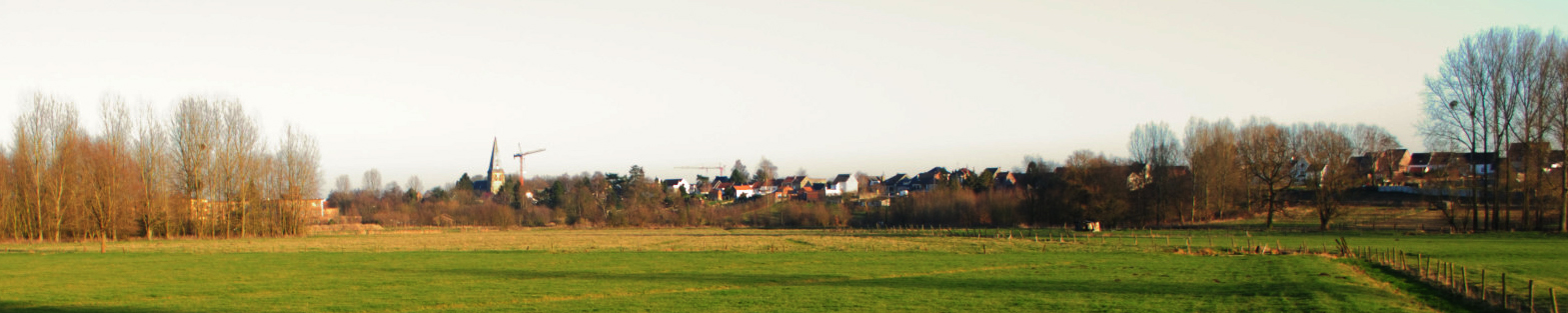
The center of Liedekerke, seen from the Dender.

== History ==
From the Carolingian era until the 11th century, Liedekerke was a part of the Shire of Brabant. Around 1056–1059, Baldwin V, Count of Flanders acquired the northwestern part of the village as a fief from the German emperor. This county ranged from the Scheldt and Dender rivers and also encompassed several other villages along the Dender, among which was Liedekerke. The name "Liekercke", which means "church on the little hill", was first drawn up as part of the county in 1092.

The fortress of the dukes of Brabant was near the Dender, on the land of Denderleeuw, with which it formed a Dominium. Through marriage of the Jacques, Marquess of Veere and Marie of Hanaert, Baronnes of Liedekercke the house of Hénin-Liétard became resident Lords of the former castle.

Between 1796 and 1815, during the French occupation, Liedekerke became part of the department of the Dyle and in 1815 it became part of South Brabant. The old castle was destroyed.

== Notable inhabitants ==
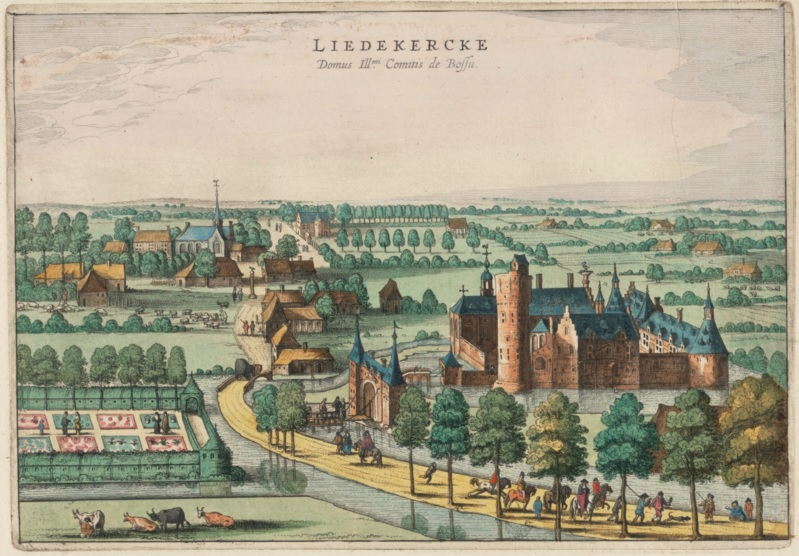
Liedekercke Castle, residence of the count of Bossu

- Maximilien II de Hénin, 5th Count of Bossu, died inside Liedekerke Castle.
- Karl Heeremans (1937–2010), painter
- Rita Deneve (1944-), singer
- Jonas Heymans (1993-), footballer
