= Szatmary =

Szatmary (or Szatmáry) is a Hungarian surname, derived from the former Szatmár County:

- Alexandru Szatmary (1894–1963), Romanian footballer
- Camil Szatmary (1909–2000), Romanian fencer
- Kristóf Szatmáry (born 1975), Hungarian politician

== See also ==
- Szathmary
