= Aldo Masciotta =

Italian fencer (1909–1996)

Personal information
- Born: 14 August 1909 Casacalenda, Italy
- Died: 24 April 1996 (aged 86) Turin, Italy

Sport
- Sport: Fencing
Medal record
Men's fencing
Representing Italy
Olympic Games
Silver medal – second place	1936 Berlin	Sabre, team

Aldo Masciotta (14 August 1909 – 24 April 1996) was an Italian fencer. He won a silver medal in the team sabre event at the 1936 Summer Olympics.
