= Schriever (surname) =

Schriever is a surname. Notable people with this surname include:

- Bernard Adolph Schriever (1910–2005), US Air Force general
- Erich Schriever, Swiss rower
- Jacob Schriever, Dutch fencer
