= Hans-Georg Jörger =

German fencer

Personal information
- Born: 26 November 1903

Sport
- Sport: Fencing
Medal record
Men's fencing
Representing Germany
Olympic Games
Bronze medal – third place	1936 Berlin	Sabre, team

Hans-Georg Jörger (born 26 November 1903, date of death unknown) was a German fencer. He won a bronze medal in the team sabre event at the 1936 Summer Olympics.
