= Roland Losert =

Austrian fencer

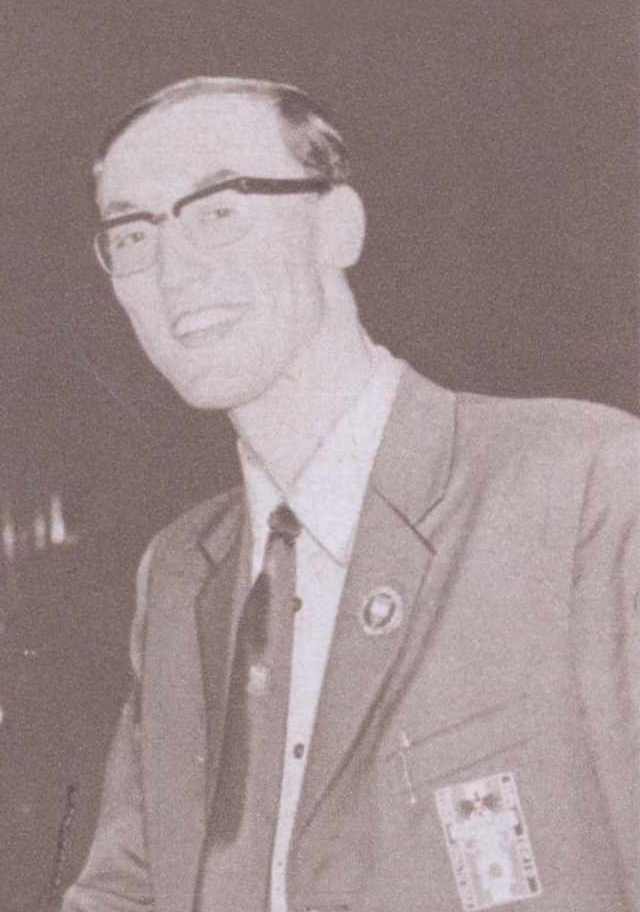

Personal information
- Born: 6 January 1945 (age 81) Vienna, Nazi Germany (now Austria)
- Height: 1.85 m (6 ft 1 in)
- Weight: 79 kg (174 lb)

Sport
- Sport: Fencing
- Club: Wiener Sport-Club
Medal record
Representing Austria
World Fencing Championships
Gold medal – first place	1963 Gdańsk	Individual épée
Summer Universiade
Bronze medal – third place	1967 Tokyo	Individual épée

Roland Losert (born 6 January 1945) is a retired Austrian fencer who won the world title in épée in 1963. He also won junior world titles in épée (1963) and foil (1964 and 1965). Losert competed at the 1964, 1968 and 1972 Summer Olympics in the individual foil and individual and team épée events (nine in total). His best achievement was fourth place in the foil in 1964.

His father Josef and sister Ingrid were also successful fencers.
