= Szathmary =

Szathmary (or Szathmáry) is a Hungarian surname:

- Elemér Szathmáry (1926–1971), Hungarian swimmer
- Emőke Szathmáry (born 1944), Hungarian anthropologist, president of The University of Manitoba
- Eörs Szathmáry (born 1959), Hungarian evolutionary biologist
- Irving Szathmary (1907–1983), American arranger and composer best known for television themes, brother of William (Bill Dana)
- Kamilló Szathmáry (1909–2000), Romanian fencer
- Louis Szathmary (1919–1996), Hungarian-American chef, restaurateur and writer
- Šimon Szathmáry (born 1995), Czech ice hockey player
- William Szathmary (1924–2017), birth name of American comedian Bill Dana, brother of Irving
- Zsigmond Szathmáry (born 1939), Hungarian organist, pianist, composer, and conductor

== See also ==
- Szatmary
