= Ingrid Losert =

German fencer

Personal information
- Born: 30 December 1958 (age 67) Freiburg, Germany

Sport
- Sport: Fencing
- Club: TS Freiburg
Medal record
Representing West Germany
World Fencing Championships
Bronze medal – third place	1979 Melbourne	Team foil
Silver medal – second place	1981 Clermont-Ferrand	Team foil
Bronze medal – third place	1982 Rome	Team foil
Silver medal – second place	1983 Vienna	Team foil

Ingrid Losert (born 30 December 1958) is a retired German fencer. She won four medals in the team foil at world championships.

Losert followed her father Joseph and brother Roland, both Olympic fencers, and started training in the age of seven. In 1975 she won a bronze medal at the World Junior Championships in Mexico. In 1978 she enrolled to the University of Freiburg to study English, French and Spanish.

In the early 1990s she spent time teaching French and German at St. Edward's Church of England School in Romford, England.
