= Hans Esser =

German fencer (1909–1988)

Personal information
- Full name: Paul Hans Esser
- Born: 15 January 1909 Essen, Germany
- Died: 26 August 1988 (aged 79) Hilden, West Germany

Sport
- Sport: Fencing
Medal record
Men's fencing
Representing Germany
Olympic Games
| Bronze medal – third place | 1936 Berlin | Sabre, team |

Hans Esser (15 January 1909 – 26 August 1988) was a German fencer. He won a bronze medal in the team sabre event at the 1936 Summer Olympics.
