= Hubert Lafortune =

Belgian artistic gymnast

- Born: 24 November 1889

Gymnastics career
- Discipline: Men's artistic gymnastics
- Country represented: Belgium
Medal record
Men's artistic gymnastics
Representing Belgium
Olympic Games
| Silver medal – second place | 1920 Antwerp | Team, European system |

Hubert Lafortune (born 24 November 1889, date of death unknown) was a Belgian gymnast who was part of the team that won silver at the 1920 Olympic Games in Antwerp.

His brothers Marcel Lafortune (4) and Jacques Lafortune (5), and nephew Frans Lafortune (7), made sixteen appearances between them at the Olympic Games for Belgium in shooting between 1924 and 1976.
