= Roger Barisien =

French fencer (1912–1969)

Personal information
- Born: 8 December 1912 Le Creusot, France
- Died: 6 December 1969 (aged 56) Saint-Maur-des-Fossés, France

Sport
- Sport: Fencing

Roger Barisien (8 December 1912 – 6 December 1969) was a French fencer. He competed in the team sabre event at the 1936 Summer Olympics.
