= Spyridon Mavrogiorgos =

Greek swimmer

Personal information
- Born: 1915

Sport
- Sport: Swimming

Spyridon Mavrogiorgos (born 1915) was a Greek swimmer. He competed in two events at the 1936 Summer Olympics.
