= Robert T'Sas =

Belgian fencer

Personal information
- Born: 11 March 1903
- Died: 29 June 1981 (aged 78)

Sport
- Sport: Fencing

Robert T'Sas (11 March 1903 – 29 June 1981) was a Belgian fencer. He competed in the team épée event at the 1936 Summer Olympics.
