= Dieudonné Devrindt =

Belgian sprinter

Personal information
- Nationality: Belgian
- Born: 24 December 1911
- Died: 31 January 1994 (aged 82)

Sport
- Sport: Sprinting
- Event: 100 metres

Dieudonné Devrindt (24 December 1911 – 31 January 1994) was a Belgian sprinter. He competed in the men's 100 metres at the 1936 Summer Olympics.
