= Vicente Krause =

Argentine fencer

Personal information
- Born: 13 September 1899
- Died: 22 April 1950 (aged 50)

Sport
- Sport: Fencing

Vicente Krause (13 September 1899 – 22 April 1950) was an Argentine fencer. He competed in the individual sabre event at the 1936 Summer Olympics.
