= Dimitar Vasilev =

Bulgarian fencer

Personal information
- Born: 20 September 1903

Sport
- Sport: Fencing

Dimitar Vasilev (Bulgarian: Димитър Василев; 20 September 1903 – ?) was a Bulgarian épée, foil and sabre fencer. He competed at the 1928 and 1936 Summer Olympics.
