= Angelos Papadimas =

Greek sports shooter

Personal information
- Born: 1893
- Died: Unknown

Sport
- Sport: Sports shooting

Angelos Papadimas (born 1893, date of death unknown) was a Greek sports shooter. He competed at the 1936 Summer Olympics and 1952 Summer Olympics.
