= Athos Tanzini =

Italian fencer

Personal information
- Born: 30 January 1913 Livorno, Italy
- Died: 28 September 2008 (aged 95) Malindi, Kenya

Sport
- Sport: Fencing
Medal record
Men's fencing
Representing Italy
Olympic Games
Silver medal – second place	1936 Berlin	Sabre, team

Athos Tanzini (30 January 1913 – 28 September 2008) was an Italian fencer. He won a silver medal in the team sabre event at the 1936 Summer Olympics.
