= Miguel de La Guardia =

Spanish chemist

Miguel de La Guardia is a Spanish chemist, who is active in the field of analytical chemistry; he is a full professor of the University of Valencia (UV). He is a member of the editorial board of Spectroscopy Letters, Ciencia (Venezuela), Journal of the Brazilian Chemical Society, Bioimpacts (Iran) and SOP Transactions on Nano-technology, and editor-in-chief of Elsevier's Microchemical Journal.

== Literature ==
- David Pozo. Entrevista a Miguel de La Guardia, catedrático de Química Analítica de la Universidad de Valencia // Interempresas. — 2009. — 16 enero.

== Web-sources ==
- "PROFESSORS: DE LA GUARDIA CIRUGEDA, MIGUEL". SOLINQUIANA, University of Valencia.
- "M. de la Guardia". Bentham Science Publishers.
