= Rezső von Bartha =

Hungarian fencer and modern pentathlete

Personal information
- Born: 26 August 1912 Budapest, Hungary
- Died: 24 July 2001 (aged 88)

Sport
- Sport: Fencing, modern pentathlon

Rezső von Bartha (26 August 1912 – 24 July 2001) was a Hungarian épée fencer and modern pentathlete. He competed at the 1936 Summer Olympics.
