= Richardos Brousalis =

Greek swimmer (born 1917)

Personal information
- Born: 1917 Smyrna, Ottoman Empire

Sport
- Sport: Swimming

Richardos Brousalis (born 1917, date of death unknown) was a Greek swimmer. He competed in two events at the 1936 Summer Olympics and the water polo tournament at the 1948 Summer Olympics. Brousalis is deceased.
