= Karl Wyss =

Swiss modern pentathlete

Personal information
- Born: 6 December 1909
- Died: 31 July 1947 (aged 37) Payerne, Vaud, Switzerland

Sport
- Sport: Modern pentathlon

Karl Wyss (6 December 1909 – 31 July 1947) was a Swiss modern pentathlete. He competed at the 1936 Summer Olympics.

Wyss died on 31 July 1947 when the Bücker Bü 133 Jungmeister plane he was piloting crashed near Payerne.
