= Karl Heeremans =

Karl Heeremans (1 June 1937 – 12 April 2010) was an artist-painter with very personal norms of colours and forms. Revolutions in contemporary art from Picasso to Kandinsky were considered to be over, and his modern approach marked late 20th-century art. His style can be described as a form of magic surrealism with cubist base and a delicate colourscale.

Karl Heeremans was born in Liedekerke, Belgium. He had private drawing and painting lessons, followed by Greek-Latin High School (1945–1955).

In 1957 he started his studies in the history of the arts and musicology at the Catholic University of Leuven, Belgium, completing his studies at the Academy of Düsseldorf, Germany with Ewald Mataré as professor(1959).

He then moved to Paris to the atelier of Anthoni Clavé, had friendships with Guiramand, Aïzpiri, Tamayo and met Picasso and Chagall (1960). In 1961 the Flemish expressionist Albert Saverijs accepted him in his atelier till his death in 1964.

From this time on, numerous awards and recognitions were presented to him, such as the 1964 – price of Namur, Belgium 1962–1967 Italian Olivetti, Knokke and Ronse, Belgium and Cannes, France.

In 1967 he finished his medical studies. The International award of Deauville was hand over to him in 1968 by André Malraux and the Anto Carte Award (1976) by Emile Langui.

On his 40th anniversary as a painter, he was honored with a retrospective of 80 paintings at the Museum "Oud Hospitaal", Aalst, Belgium.

In the community hall of Liedekerke, Belgium, there is a permanent exhibition of his works. The chapel of Liedekerke also contains a large mural he created in 1993.

Karl Heeremans died on 12 April 2010.
