= Gheorghe Man =

Romanian fencer

Personal information
- Born: 20 March 1914
- Died: 24 February 1972 (aged 57)

Sport
- Sport: Fencing

Gheorghe Man (20 March 1914 – 24 February 1972) was a Romanian fencer. He competed in the team sabre event at the 1936 Summer Olympics.
