= Hildemaro Lista =

Uruguayan fencer

Personal information
- Born: 26 January 1905 Durazno, Uruguay
- Died: 13 November 1976 (aged 71)

Sport
- Sport: Fencing

Hildemaro Lista (26 January 1905 – 13 November 1976) was a Uruguayan fencer. He competed in the team sabre event at the 1936 Summer Olympics.
