= Willy Grundbacher =

Swiss modern pentathlete

Personal information
- Born: 5 July 1907
- Died: November 1997 (aged 90)

Sport
- Sport: Modern pentathlon

Willy Fritz Grundbacher (5 July 1907 – November 1997) was a Swiss modern pentathlete. He competed at the 1936 Summer Olympics.
