= Roc de la Guàrdia (Balenyà) =

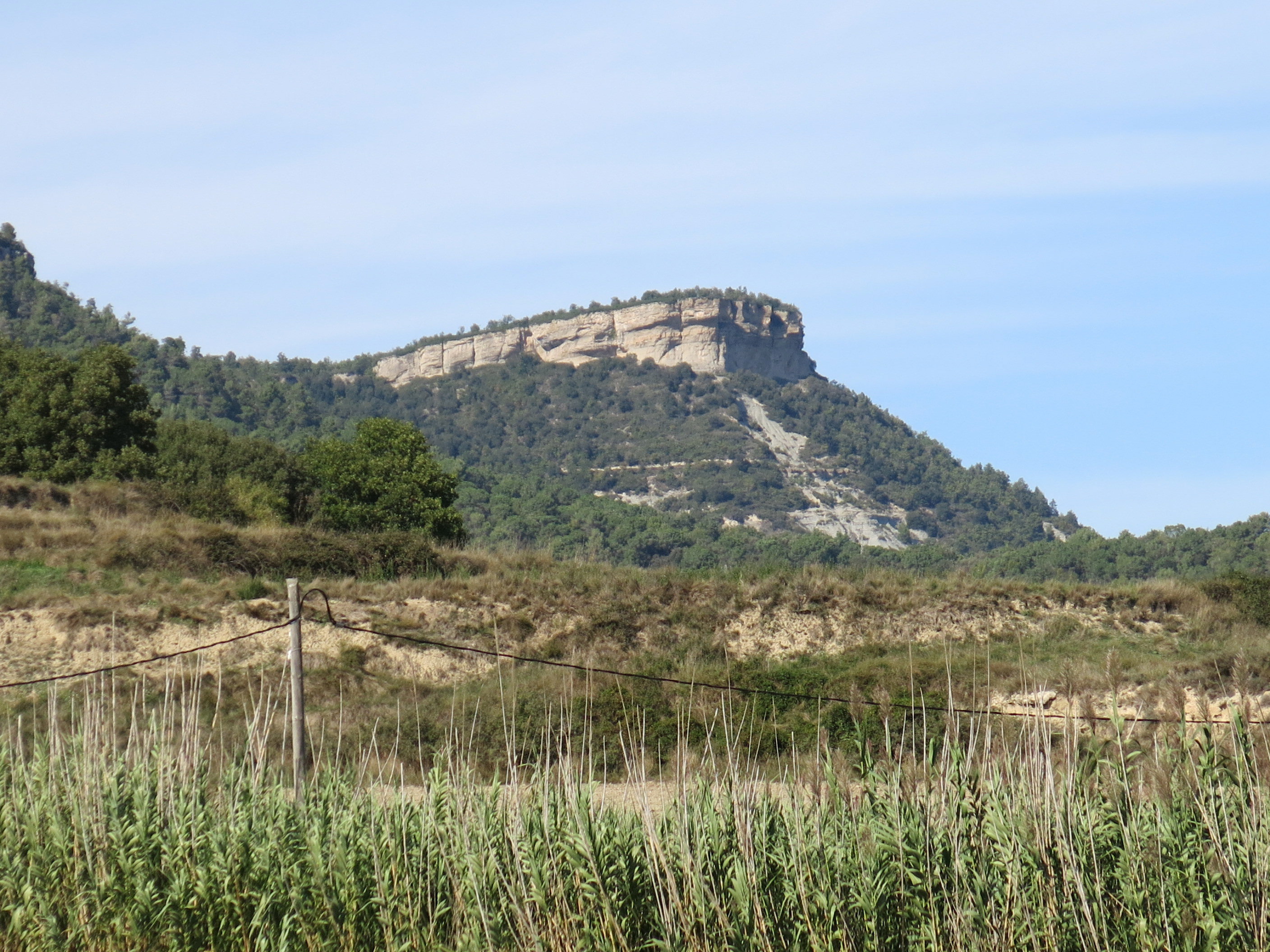

Highest point
- Elevation: 891 m (2,923 ft)
- Coordinates: 41°49′30.7″N 2°12′13.00″E

Geography
- Location: Osona, Catalonia
- Parent range: Catalan Transversal Range

Geology
- Mountain type: Limestone

Roc de la Guàrdia (Balenyà) is a mountain of Catalonia, Spain. It has an elevation of 891 metres above sea level.

It is the emblematic mountain of Els Hostalets de Balenyà town nearby.

== See also ==
- Mountains of Catalonia
