= Archibald Jack (pentathlete) =

British modern pentathlete (1903–1997)

Personal information
- Born: 21 July 1913
- Died: 13 January 1997 (aged 83)

Sport
- Sport: Modern pentathlon

Archibald Jack (21 July 1913 – 13 January 1997) was a British modern pentathlete. He competed at the 1936 Summer Olympics.
