= Imre Rajczy =

Hungarian fencer (1911–1978)

Personal information
- Born: 8 November 1911 Szombathely, Austria-Hungary
- Died: 31 March 1978 (aged 66) Buenos Aires, Argentina

Sport
- Sport: Fencing
Medal record
Men's fencing
Representing Hungary
Olympic Games
Gold medal – first place	1936 Berlin	Sabre, team

Imre Rajczy (8 November 1911 – 31 March 1978) was a Hungarian fencer. He won a gold medal in the team sabre event at the 1936 Summer Olympics. After World War II, in 1945 he immigrated to Argentina.
