= La Guardia, Nueva Esparta =

La Guardia
- Town
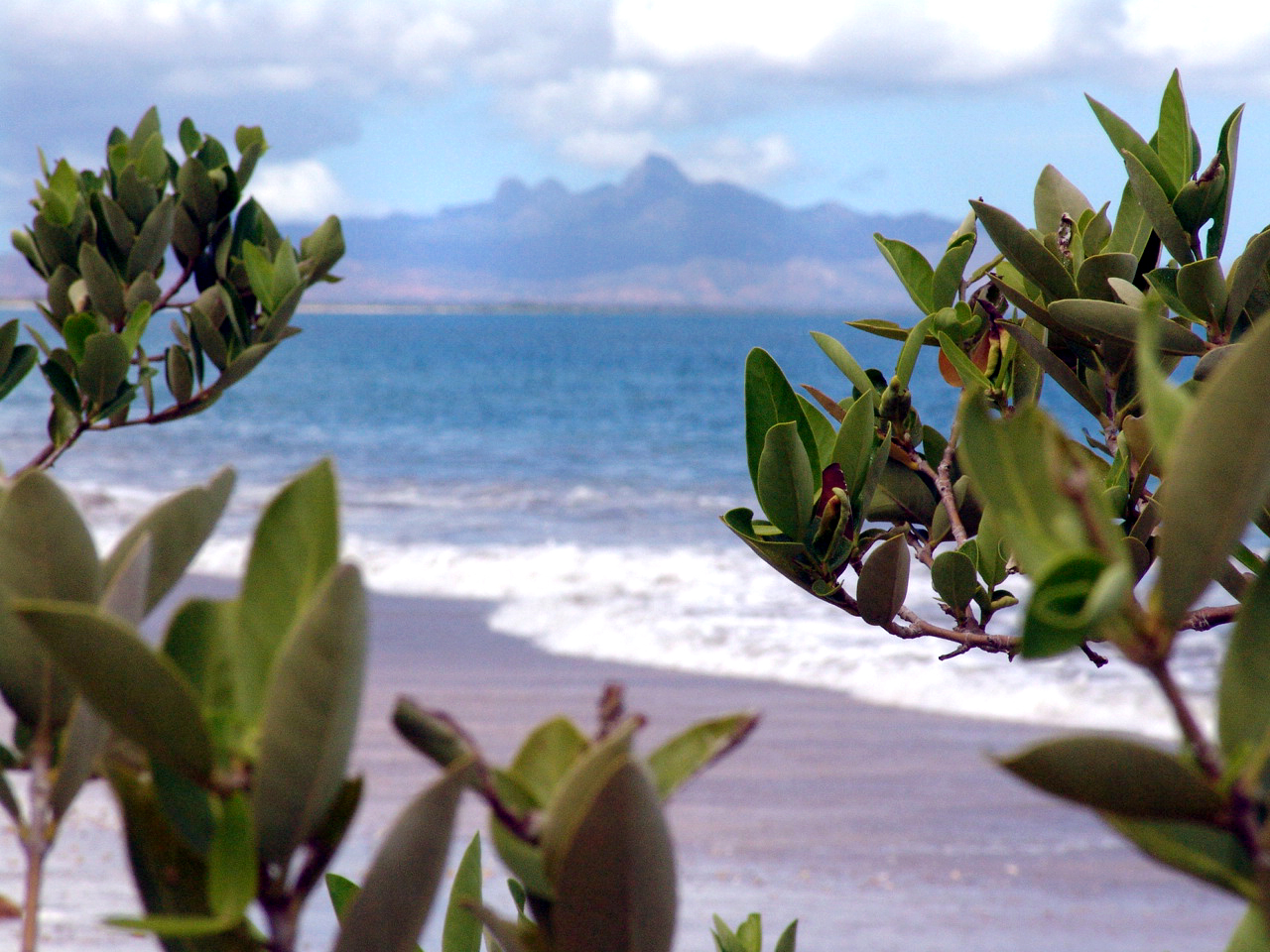
- View from La Guardia looking west to the rugged Macanao Peninsula

- Location within Venezuela
- Coordinates: 10.992°N 64.021°W
- Country: Venezuela
- State: Nueva Esparta
- Municipality: Municipio Díaz
- Climate: BSh

La Guardia is a fishing and tourist community on the northwest coast of Isla Margarita, Venezuela.

== Location ==
La Guardia lies at the eastern end of a bar, or strip of land, that stretches more than 15 miles (24 km) from the main island of Margarita to Punta Tigre on the Macanao Peninsula, running between the Laguna de la Restinga and the Caribbean Sea. The bar is made of rocks and pebbles of different sizes and huge numbers of sea shells. The bar also forms the northern shore of one of the largest bays in the world.

== History ==
The original name was Caranta-maura, which means "great bay" in the guaiquerí language. Later it was called Bufadero. The first mention of this name is in a document dated 27 September 1754, when it is mentioned as a place on the coast. José de Matos y Rabel was appointed Governor of Margarita on 5 July 1764 and took office on 3 January 1765. On 21 July 1765 he mentioned in a letter to the King of Spain that he had installed two guards at the location to protect the island from smuggling, and this is the origin of the current name. The name Bufadero still appears in a map of Isla Margarita dated 15 June 1777, and there are records of sales of cattle at Bufaderos in 1794 and in 1802.

The name "La Guardia" is relatively recent. It is mentioned in a document of 24 February 1872 that Diego Romero had built three houses near the house of La Guardia in Bufadero, and this may be the origin of today's community. In 1899 the place was officially called Caserío (hamlet) La Guardia. In 1915 it was renamed Zabala, but the official name is not widely used.

== Activities ==
Many of the people are engaged in fishing. Seafood includes mussels, oysters, octopus, mackerel and corocoro (gruntfish). The Virgin de María Auxiliadora is the patron saint of the town, and is celebrated on 24 May each year with processions, masses and events on the square in front of the church dedicated to the saint. On 16 July each year the fishermen observe the day of the Virgen del Carmen, carrying her image in the long procession along the length of the bay.

== Gallery ==
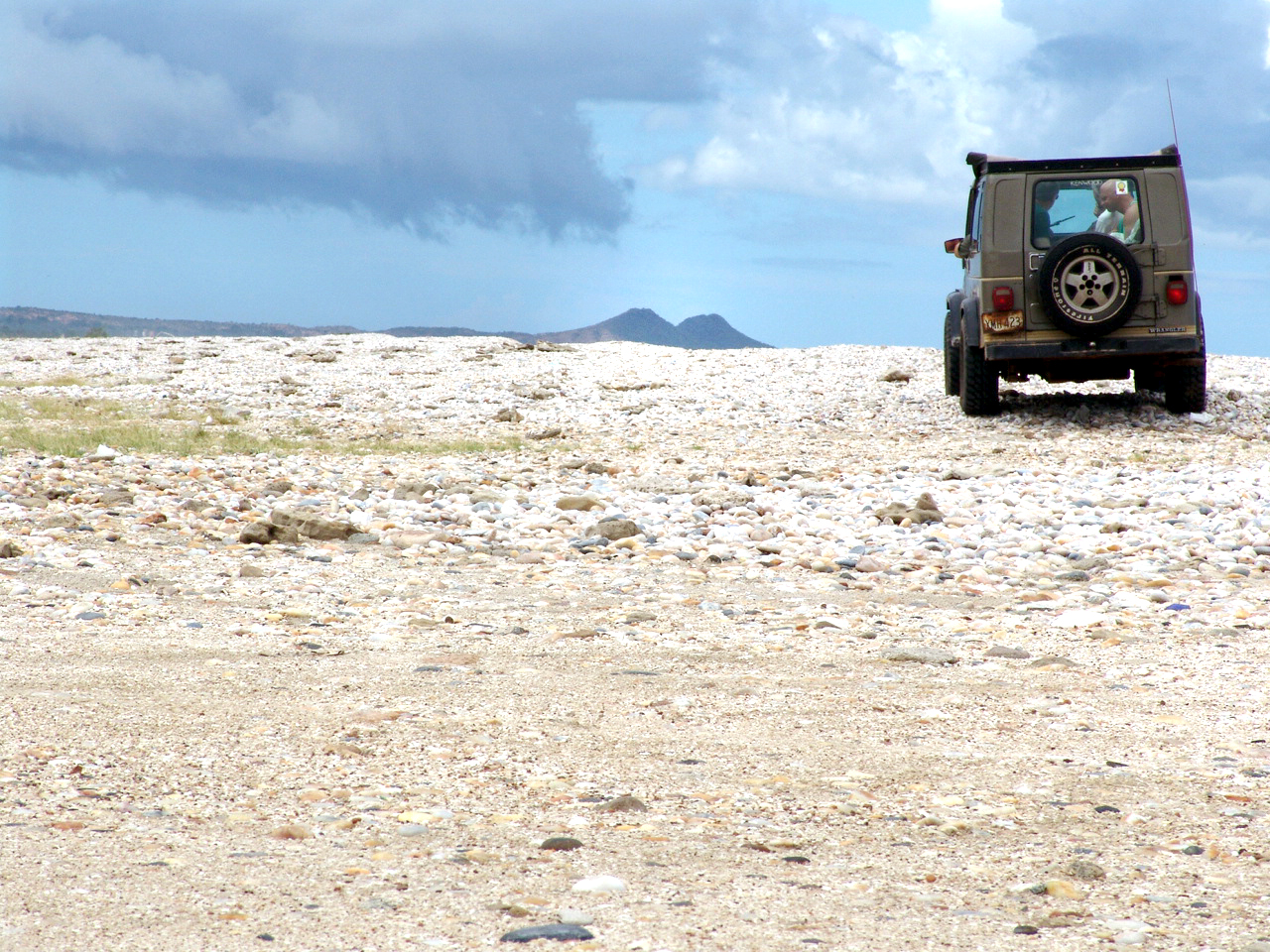
Car on the beach

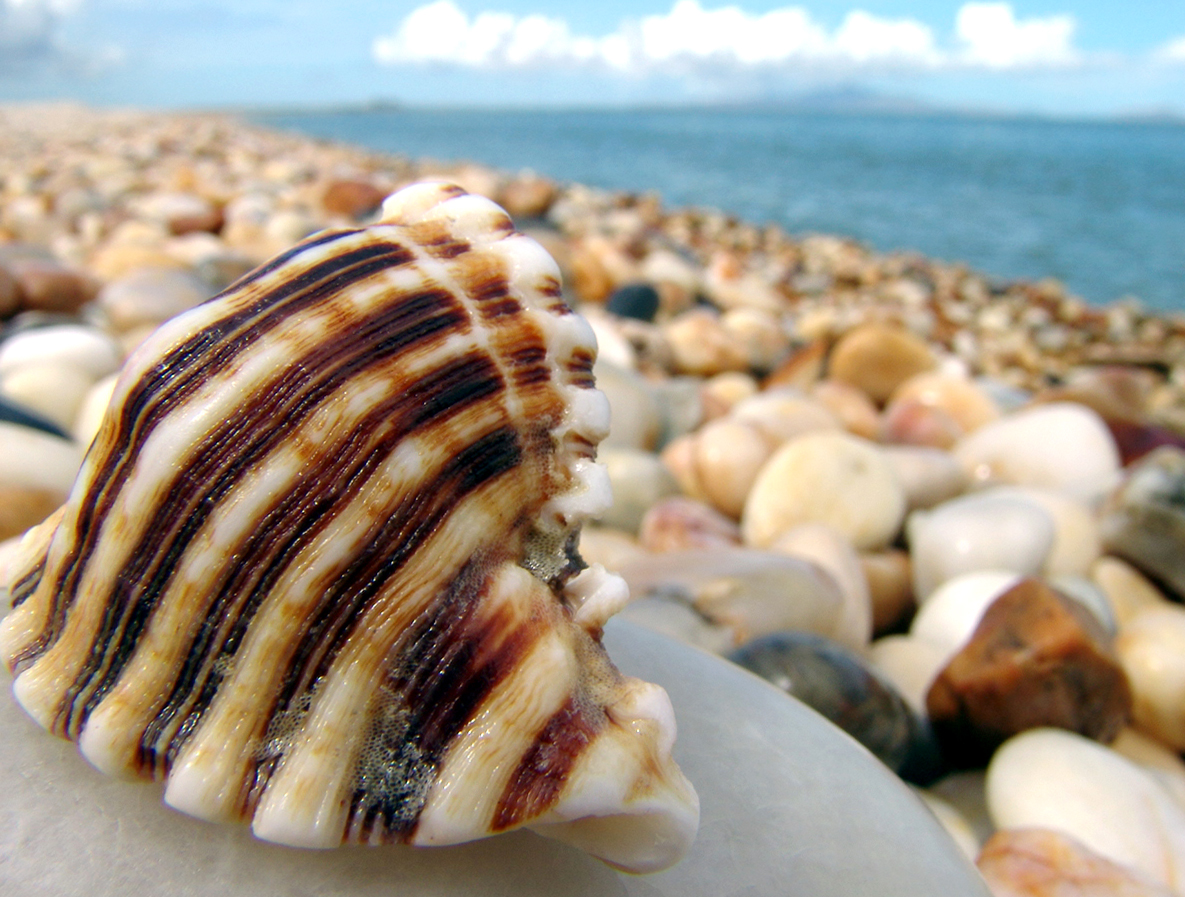
Shell fragment of Chicoreus brevifrons on a pebble beach

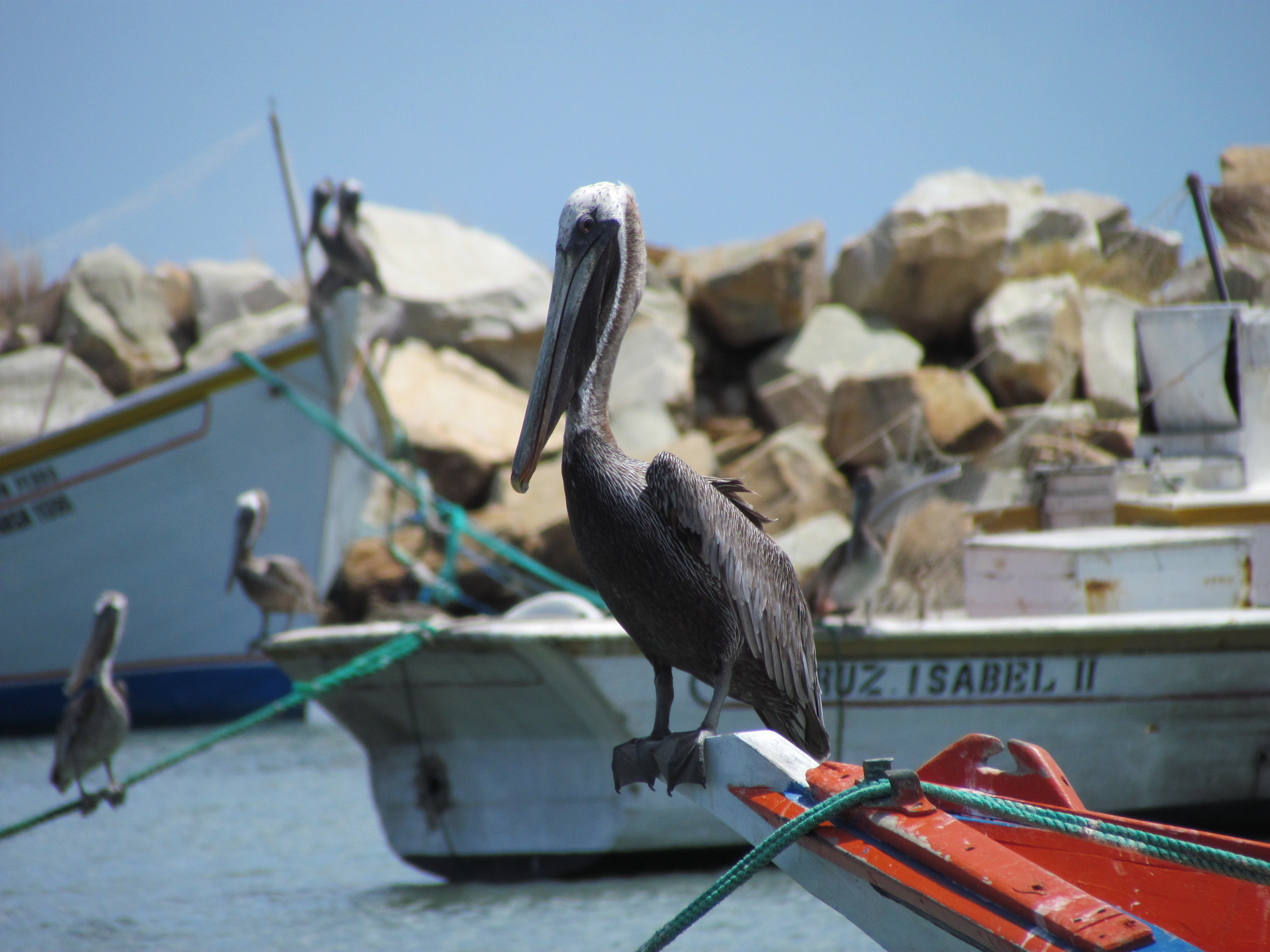
Pelican on a fishing boat

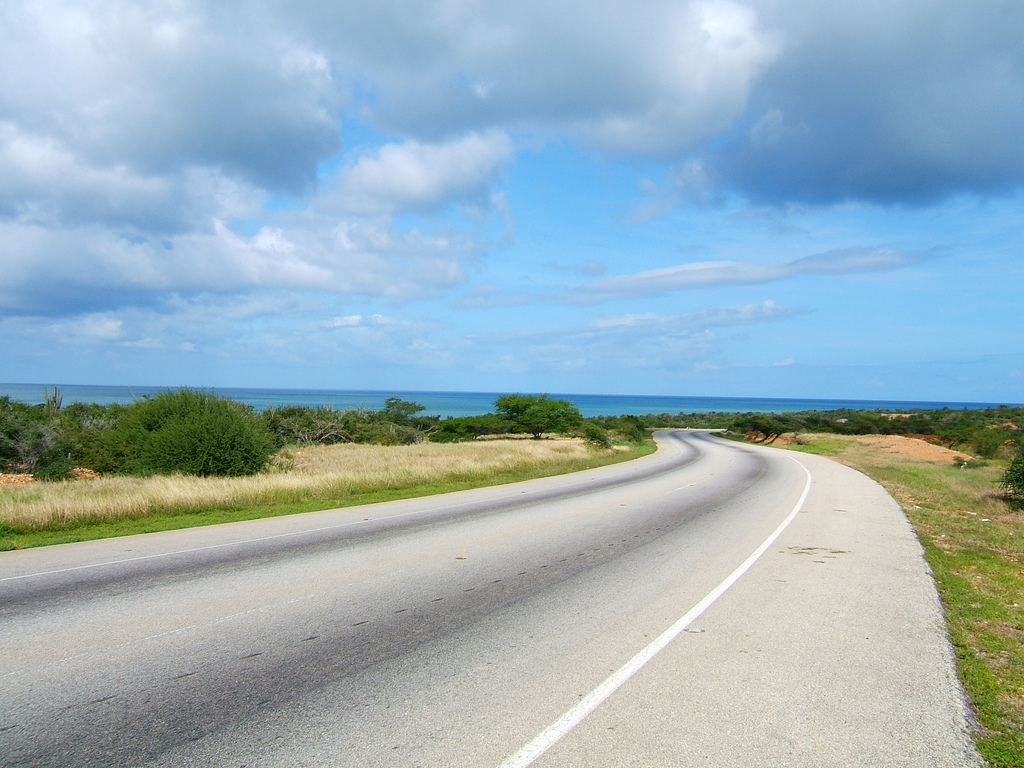
Road north from La Guardia to Juan Griego
