= Richard Wahl =

German fencer

Personal information
- Born: 4 December 1906
- Died: 29 October 1982 (aged 75)

Sport
- Sport: Fencing
Medal record
Men's fencing
Representing Germany
Olympic Games
Bronze medal – third place	1936 Berlin	Sabre, team

Richard Wahl (4 December 1906 – 29 October 1982) was a German fencer. He won a bronze medal in the team sabre event at the 1936 Summer Olympics.
