= Jacob Schriever =

Dutch fencer (1903–1964)

Personal information
- Born: 12 April 1903 Utrecht, Netherlands
- Died: 22 April 1964 (aged 61) Dordrecht, Netherlands

Sport
- Sport: Fencing

Jacob Schriever (12 April 1903 – 22 April 1964) was a Dutch fencer. He competed in the team sabre event at the 1936 Summer Olympics.
