= Nikolaos Paparrodou =

Greek fencer

Personal information
- Born: 1902
- Died: 1980 (aged 77–78)

Sport
- Sport: Fencing

Nikolaos Paparrodou (Greek: Νικόλαος Παπαρρόδου, 1902 – 1980) was a Greek fencer. He competed in the team sabre event at the 1936 Summer Olympics.
