= Ugo Ceccarelli =

Italian modern pentathlete (1911–1940)

Personal information
- Born: 1911
- Died: 1940 (aged 28–29)

Sport
- Sport: Modern pentathlon

Ugo Ceccarelli (1911–1940) was an Italian modern pentathlete. He competed at the 1936 Summer Olympics. He was killed during World War II.
