= Marcel Lafortune =

Belgian sports shooter (1900–1983)

Personal information
- Born: Jean Josse Marcel Lafortune; 29 September 1900 Leuven, Belgium
- Died: 30 August 1983 (aged 82) Leuven, Belgium

Sport
- Sport: Sports shooting

Jean Josse Marcel Lafortune (29 September 1900 – 30 August 1983) was a Belgian rifle shooter who competed at four Olympic Games (1936, 1948, 1956, 1960). He was born in Leuven.

His best result was 8th at the 50m Free Pistol at the 1948 Olympics in London.

Lafortune came from a shooting family with sixteen Olympic appearances between them. His 1948 appearance at the Olympics was with his older brother, five-time Olympian François Lafortune, Sr. His 1956 appearance was with his nephew, seven-time Olympian François Lafortune, Jr. His 1960 appearance was with both François Lafortunes.

Lafortune died on 30 August 1983, at the age of 82. His other brother Hubert Lafortune was part of the Belgium gymnastics team that won silver at the 1920 Olympic Games.
