= Lauri Kettunen (fencer) =

Finnish fencer

Personal information
- Born: 12 February 1905 Antrea, Grand Duchy of Finland, Russian Empire
- Died: 15 August 1941 (aged 36) Helsinki, Finland

Sport
- Sport: Fencing, modern pentathlon

Lauri Kettunen (12 February 1905 – 15 August 1941) was a Finnish fencer and modern pentathlete. He competed at the 1928 and 1936 Summer Olympics. He was an officer in the Finnish army, reaching the rank of major. He died during the Continuation War while fighting along the Finnish III Corps in Kiestinki.
