= Hubert Van Nerom =

Belgian fencer

Personal information
- Born: 24 May 1908 Saint-Josse-ten-Noode, Belgium

Sport
- Sport: Fencing

Hubert Van Nerom (born 24 May 1908, date of death unknown) was a Belgian Olympic fencer. He competed in the team sabre event at the 1936 Summer Olympics.
