= François Lafortune Jr. =

Belgian sport shooter (1932–2020)

Personal information
- Born: François Jacques Marie Gerard Lafortune; 7 December 1932 Visé, Belgium
- Died: 18 April 2020 (aged 87)

Sport
- Sport: Sports shooting

François Jacques Marie Gerard Lafortune (7 December 1932 – 18 April 2020) was a Belgian rifle shooter who competed at seven Olympic Games from 1952 to 1976.

== Early life ==
He was born in Visé. His best finish was 10th in the 50m Rifle, Prone Position at the 1968 Olympics in Mexico City. With seven Olympic participations, he shared the Belgian record with table tennis player Jean-Michel Saive.

He came from a sporting family with 17 Olympic appearances between them. His father François Lafortune Sr. represented Belgium in shooting at five Olympic Games, his uncle Marcel Lafortune represented Belgium in shooting at four Olympic Games, and his uncle Hubert Lafortune was part of the Belgium gymnastics team that won silver at the 1920 Olympic Games.

== Rifle shooting ==
In 1952, he competed at the Olympics with his father, in 1956 with his uncle, and in 1960 with both.

Father and son faced each other four times in the Olympics, all in 50m Rifle contests. In 1952, they both scored 1131 points in the Three Positions while François Jr scored 388 to François Sr's 387 in the Prone Position. In 1960, François Sr scored 1108 to his son's 1099 in the Three Positions, and 574 to his son's 555 in the Prone Position.

François Jr did not directly compete with uncle Marcel at the 1956 Olympics as Marcel was competing in different events.

At the 1958 World Championships, he won the bronze medal.

== Personal life ==
Lafortune studied medicine and worked as Chief Physician for the Belgian Ministry of Public Health, and for the Red Cross. He never was a professional sportsman and shot purely as a hobby. He was married to Netty Lafortune and they had two children, a daughter and a son: Eric Lafortune is the partner of Heidi Rakels, a bronze medal winner at the 1992 Olympics.

Lafortune died on 18 April 2020 from Parkinson's disease.

== See also ==
- List of athletes with the most appearances at Olympic Games
