= Samuel Stewart (fencer) =

American fencer (1912–1950)

Personal information
- Born: January 31, 1912 New York, New York, United States
- Died: September 19, 1950 (aged 38) Clifton, New Jersey, United States

Sport
- Sport: Fencing

Samuel Stewart (31 January 1912 – 19 September 1950) was an American fencer. He competed in the team sabre event at the 1936 Summer Olympics.
