= Silvano Abbà =

Italian modern pentathlete (1911–1942)

Silvano Abba
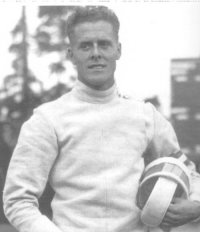

Personal information
- Born: 3 July 1911 Rovigno, Austrian Littoral, Austria-Hungary
- Died: 24 August 1942 (aged 31) near Stalingrad, Soviet Union

Sport
- Sport: Modern pentathlon
Medal record
Men's modern pentathlon
Representing Italy
Olympic Games
Bronze medal – third place	1936 Berlin	Individual

Silvano Abba (3 July 1911 – 24 August 1942) was an Italian modern pentathlete who won a bronze medal at the 1936 Summer Olympics. Abba was a military man, who led the Italian Savoy Cavalry squadron in August 1942 at the Charge of the Savoia Cavalleria at Isbuscenskij near Stalingrad. Abba was killed, along with 32 other riders who were killed by the Soviets. It is one of the last cavalry charges in military history, and resulted in victory for the Italian Savoia Cavalleria regiment, led by Colonel Alessandro Bettoni Cazzago.
