= Jean Plumier =

Belgian fencer

Personal information
- Born: 17 January 1909

Sport
- Sport: Fencing

Jean Plumier (born 17 January 1909, date of death unknown) was a Belgian fencer. He competed in the team épée event at the 1936 Summer Olympics.
