= Marcel Faure =

French fencer

Personal information
- Born: 5 March 1905
- Died: 10 October 1984 (aged 79)

Sport
- Sport: Fencing

Marcel Faure (5 March 1905 – 10 October 1984) was a French fencer. He competed in the individual and team sabre events at the 1936 Summer Olympics.
