= París Rodríguez =

Uruguayan fencer

Personal information
- Born: 22 December 1904 Paysandú, Uruguay

Sport
- Sport: Fencing

París Rodríguez (born 22 December 1904, date of death unknown) was a Uruguayan fencer. He competed in the individual and team sabre events at the 1936 Summer Olympics.
