= Antonius Montfoort =

Dutch fencer (1902–1974)

Personal information
- Born: 26 September 1902 The Hague, Netherlands
- Died: 29 April 1974 (aged 71) Voorburg, Netherlands

Sport
- Sport: Fencing

Antonius Montfoort (26 September 1902 – 29 April 1974) was a Dutch fencer. He competed in the individual and team sabre events at the 1936 Summer Olympics.
