= Oliver Trinder =

British fencer

Personal information
- Full name: Oliver Geoffrey Trinder
- Nationality: British
- Born: 3 October 1907 Dartford, Kent, England
- Died: 12 February 1981 (aged 73) Sunninghill, England

Sport
- Sport: Fencing
Medal record
Men's fencing
Representing United Kingdom
World Championships
Bronze medal – third place	1933 Budapest	Team

Oliver Geoffrey Trinder (3 October 1907 – 12 February 1981) was a British fencer. He competed in the individual and team sabre events at the 1936 Summer Olympics, reaching the semi-finals.
