= Édouard Écuyer de le Court =

Modern pentathlete

Personal information
- Born: 6 September 1901 Ixelles, Belgium
- Died: 10 February 1951 (aged 49) Crans-Montana, Switzerland

Sport
- Sport: Modern pentathlon

Édouard Écuyer de le Court (6 September 1901 – 10 February 1951) was a Belgian modern pentathlete. He competed at the 1928 and 1936 Summer Olympics.
