= Josef Losert =

Austrian fencer

Personal information
- Born: 4 February 1908
- Died: 25 October 1993 (aged 85)

Sport
- Sport: Fencing
- Club: Wiener Sport-Club

Josef Losert (4 February 1908 – 25 October 1993) was an Austrian fencer. He competed in the individual and team foil and sabre events at the 1936 Summer Olympics with the best achievement of fourth place in the team foil. During his career he won 18 national titles in the foil, sabre and épée. His son Roland and daughter Ingrid also became successful fencers.
