= José Escribens =

Peruvian modern pentathlete

Personal information
- Full name: José Luis Escribens Pacheco
- Born: 9 September 1911
- Died: 19 October 1956 (aged 45) Lima, Peru

Sport
- Sport: Modern pentathlon

José Escribens (9 September 1911 – 19 October 1956) was a Peruvian modern pentathlete. He competed at the 1936 Summer Olympics.
