= Jean Heeremans =

Belgian fencer

Personal information
- Born: 31 January 1914 Farciennes, Hainaut, Belgium
- Died: 2 August 1970 (aged 56) Los Angeles, California, United States

Sport
- Sport: Fencing

Jean Heeremans (31 January 1914 – 2 August 1970) was a Belgian fencer. He competed in the team foil event at the 1936 Summer Olympics.
