= Jan Scheere =

Belgian pentathlete (1909–1977)

Personal information
- Born: 25 June 1909
- Died: 16 July 1977 (aged 68)

Sport
- Sport: Modern pentathlon

Jan Scheere (25 June 1909 – 16 July 1977) was a Belgian modern pentathlete. He competed at the 1936 Summer Olympics.
