= Guy Harry =

British fencer (1894–1979)

Personal information
- Born: 19 December 1894 Edmonton, London, England
- Died: 9 January 1979 (aged 84) Warminster, Wiltshire, England

Sport
- Sport: Fencing

Guy Lionel Greville Harry (19 December 1894 – 9 January 1979) was a British fencer. He competed at the 1928 and 1936 Summer Olympics. In 1928, he won the sabre title at the British Fencing Championships.
