= Alexandros Baltatzis-Mavrokorlatis =

Greek modern pentathlete

Personal information
- Born: 1906

Sport
- Sport: Modern pentathlon

Alexandros Baltatzis-Mavrokorlatis (born 1906, date of death unknown) was a Greek modern pentathlete. He competed at the 1936 Summer Olympics in Berlin.
