= Eugène Laermans (fencer) =

Belgian fencer (born 1910)

Personal information
- Born: Eugène Gregoire Laermans; 8 May 1910 Tienen, Belgium

Sport
- Sport: Fencing

Eugène Gregoire Laermans (born 8 May 1910, date of death unknown) was a Belgian sabre fencer. He competed at the 1936 and 1948 Summer Olympics.
