= Robert Van Den Neucker =

Belgian fencer

Personal information
- Born: 20 July 1907

Sport
- Sport: Fencing

Robert Van Den Neucker (born 20 July 1907, date of death unknown) was a Belgian Olympic fencer. He competed in the individual and team sabre events at the 1936 Summer Olympics.
