= Pieter van Wieringen =

Dutch fencer (1903–1997)

Personal information
- Born: 28 March 1903 Rotterdam, Netherlands
- Died: 1997 (aged 93–94) Sydney, Australia

Sport
- Sport: Fencing

Franciscus Pieter van Wieringen (28 March 1903 – 1997) was a Dutch fencer. He competed in the individual and team sabre events at the 1936 Summer Olympics.
