= Menelaos Psarrakis =

Greek fencer

Personal information
- Born: 1910

Sport
- Sport: Fencing

Menelaos Psarrakis (Greek: Μενέλαος Ψαρράκης, born 1910, date of death unknown) was a Greek fencer. He competed in the team foil and the individual and team sabre events at the 1936 Summer Olympics.
