= José Julián de la Fuente =

Uruguayan fencer

Personal information
- Born: 14 September 1903 Montevideo, Uruguay

Sport
- Sport: Fencing

José Julián de la Fuente (born 14 September 1903, date of death unknown) was a Uruguayan fencer. He competed in the individual and team sabre events at the 1936 Summer Olympics.
