= John Huffman (fencer) =

American fencer

Personal information
- Born: February 17, 1905 Norfolk, Virginia, United States
- Died: December 24, 1979 (aged 74) Seattle, Washington, United States

Sport
- Sport: Fencing

John Huffman (February 17, 1905 – December 24, 1979) was an American sabre fencer. He competed at the 1928, 1932 and 1936 Summer Olympics.

== See also ==
- List of USFA Division I National Champions
