= Georges Heywaert =

Belgian fencer

Personal information
- Born: 1 September 1897

Sport
- Sport: Fencing

Georges Heywaert (born 1 September 1897, date of death unknown) was a Belgian fencer. He competed in the individual and team sabre events at the 1936 Summer Olympics.
