= Kamilló Szathmáry =

Romanian fencer

Personal information
- Born: 11 March 1909 Nagyvárad, Austria-Hungary
- Died: 21 June 2000 (aged 91) Knoxville, Tennessee, US

Sport
- Sport: Fencing

Kamilló Szathmáry (11 March 1909 – 21 June 2000) was a Romanian fencer. He competed in the individual and team sabre events at the 1936 Summer Olympics.
