= François Lafortune Sr. =

Belgian sports shooter (1896–1985)

Personal information
- Born: 10 January 1896 Leuven, Belgium
- Died: 11 January 1985 (aged 89) Leuven, Belgium

Sport
- Sport: Sports shooting

François Jacques Florentin Lafortune (10 January 1896 – 11 January 1985) was a Belgian rifle shooter who competed at five Olympic Games (1924, 1936, 1948, 1952, 1960).

== Biography ==
Lafortune was born in Leuven on 10 January 1896. He was part of a shooting family with sixteen Olympic appearances between them. His last two Olympic appearances were made with his son, seven-time-Olympian Frans Lafortune. His last Olympic appearance was also made with his younger brother, four-time Olympian Marcel Lafortune.

Lafortune died in Leuven on 11 January 1985, at the age of 89. His older brother Hubert Lafortune was part of the Belgian gymnastics team that won silver at the 1920 Olympic Games.
