= Gustavs Ērenpreis =

Former Latvian bicycle manufacturer

- Born: 5 September 1891; Mazsalaca, Latvia
- Died: 19 May 1956 (aged 64); West Germany
- Known for: Recipient of the Order of the Three Stars and Cross of Recognition

Gustavs Ērenpreis (5 September 1891 – 19 May 1956) was a Latvian manufacturer of bicycles best known as the recipient of the Order of the Three Stars and Cross of Recognition, and as a founder and director of Gustavs Ērenpreis Bicycle Factory, which in the 1930s was the largest manufacturer of bicycles in the Baltic States. Ērenpreis's bicycles were ridden by a generation of elite bicycle racers in Latvia.

== Personal life ==
Gustavs Ērenpreis was the son of Valtenberģi Manor coachman Lībijs and Anna. He was born in Vatenberģi (today, Mazsalaca), Latvia which at that time was in the Russian Empire. Ērenpreis was educated at a trade school in Riga.

He was married twice and had one child from the first marriage – a son Jānis, and four children from the second marriage – a son Juris and three daughters – Anita, Maija and Sarmīte.

Gustavs Ērenpreis was decorated with the Order of the Three Stars medal, the highest order of the Republic of Latvia, and the Cross of Recognition of the Republic of Latvia.

After the nationalization of the bicycle USSR, Gustavs emigrated to West Germany where he worked in a sawmill. He never returned to his homeland Latvia and died after an illness in Detmold, Germany. He was buried in Augsdorf.

== Career ==
After graduation of trade school in Riga, in 1907 he worked at the Eduards Bērziņš bicycle workshop in Riga, which produced bicycles and repaired and sold English Triumph and Douglas motorcycles in the Baltic States. During World War I he was evacuated with the workshop to Kharkiv. After the war, the workshop equipment could not be recovered, and Gustavs had to return to Riga, Latvia without any equipment.

In 1921, following the end of the war, Ērenpreis launched his own workshop, where in early years he repaired and sold abandoned military transports of the Bermont army. He moved into manufacturing the following year as the "G. Ērenpreis Motorcycle and Bicycle Workshop", where he first manufactured his own bicycles under the "Baltija" label.

Due to rapid expansion, the limited space in his workshop had become a problem, and in 1924 the Ērenpreis workshop moved to a larger space. In 1926 Gustavs Ērenpreis and his business partners established a joint-stock company called Omega, but this entity was ultimately abandoned that same year.

=== G. Ērenpreis Bicycle Factory ===
Those first manufacturing efforts were preliminary to the actual establishment of a new manufacturing entity called the G. Ērenpreis Bicycle Factory in 1927. The new firm continued in its previous quarters until, in 1931, construction began on a new, modern bicycle factory located on in Brīvības Street. Janis Seregins, the biggest bicycle collection owner in Baltics and the author of historic review of Latvian bicycle history "100 year of bicycle manufacturing in Latvia. From Leutner to Erenpreis" points out that by 1937 the factory had become the largest manufacturer of bicycles in the Baltic States.

In addition to being the largest Latvian bicycle manufacture of its day, the G. Ērenpreis bicycle factory was regarded as the source of the highest quality bikes for Latvian competitive cyclists. G. Ērenpreis bicycles were ridden by the top Latvian cyclists of the era, including Olympic cyclists Arvīds Immermanis and Andrejs Apsītis.

=== Nationalization of factory and legacy ===
World War II and the occupation of Latvia halted G. Ērenpreis bicycle factory work. The Ērenpreis company was nationalized by the USSR and renamed the "Red Star Riga Bicycle Factory" (Rīgas Velosipēdu rūpnīca (RVR) "Sarkanā Zvaigzne"). Bicycle production continued at that company until 1963, when the factory was retooled and converted to the production of mopeds. Today G. Ērenpreis bicycles are exhibited at the Riga Motor Museum as part of the country's industrial heritage.

Starting in 2011, Gustavs hometown Mazsalaca has celebrated Gustavs Ērenpreis birthday in the festival "Velosvētki - Ērenpreisam 124" (bicycle festival - Ērenpreiss - 124 years old!")

In 2012 the brand was revived by Gustavs Ērenpreis' great-grandnephew, Toms Ērenpreiss, who manufactures new Ērenpreiss bicycles.
