= Swedish Business Awards =

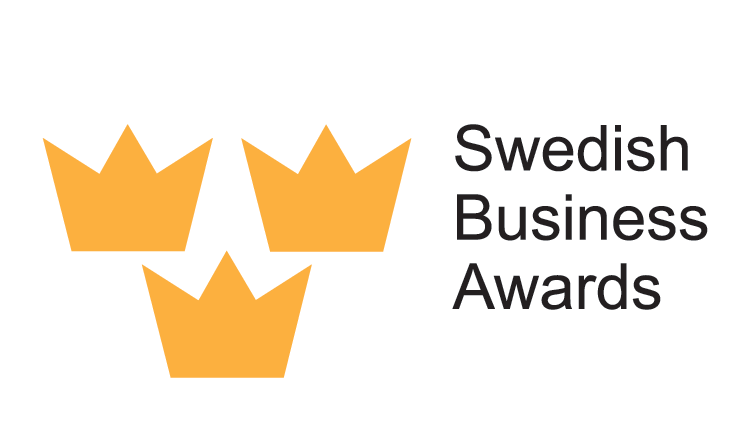

The Swedish Business Awards were established in 2006. The project aims to provide positive examples for international establishments and business development by highlighting the success of cooperation, emphasizing innovativeness, outstanding business achievements and the importance of contributions to society. This initiative promotes internationalization of business and serves as a yearly meeting point to discuss achievements, practices and aims. Culmination of the project is the ceremony which includes presentations, discussions and awards for the most successful international and local companies operating in Lithuania, Latvia and Estonia.

The Swedish Business Awards are prestigious event - selected participants are invited, combining representatives from Swedish companies, top executives and opinion leaders on National business stage and top politicians. In addition to this, in 2014 in Estonia awards were handed by Crown Princess of Sweden Victoria, while in 2015 in Lithuania by HM King Carl XVI Gustaf.

== Sustainable event ==
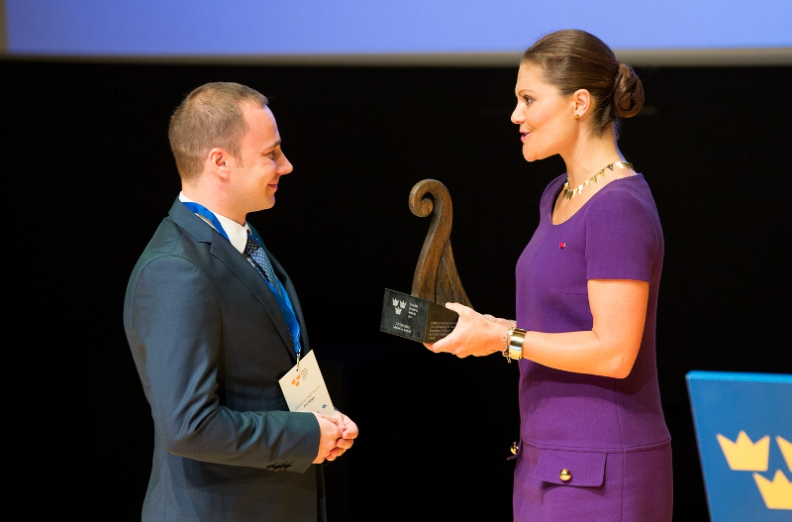

In 2015, celebrating 10th anniversary, Swedish Business Awards became the first sustainable event in Lithuania, organized in accordance with the requirements of ISO 20121:2012 standards. ISO 20121:2012 Event Sustainability Management System standard is applicable for any type of event or event-related activity and to any organization that wishes to establish, implement, maintain or improve an event sustainability management system. In order to offset the direct and unavoidable carbon emissions from this event organization, the organizers of the awards planted around 5 thousand trees in Lithuanian forests.

== Organization ==
The project was initiated in 2006 by four organizations:

- Embassy of Sweden in Lithuania
- The Swedish Trade & Invest Council - Business Sweden
- Swedbank (previously called Hansabankas)
- TeliaSonera

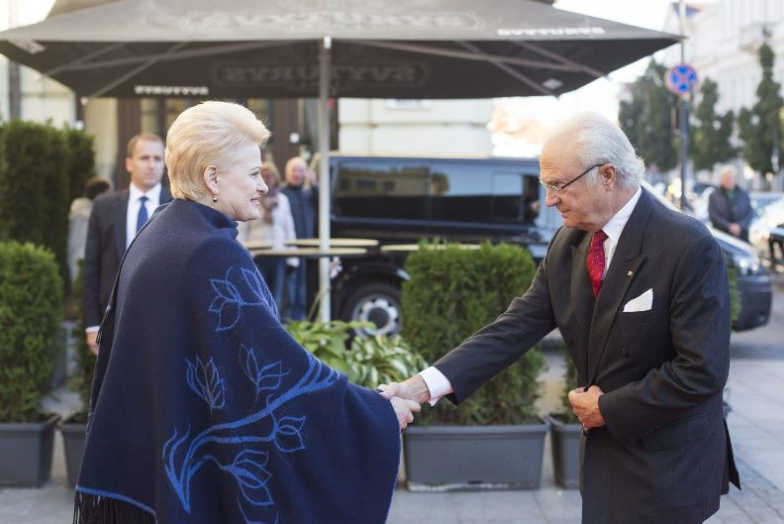

The main sponsors and partners of the event:

- Teo
- Valiunas Ellex
- Volvo Trucks
- Ericsson
- Delfi
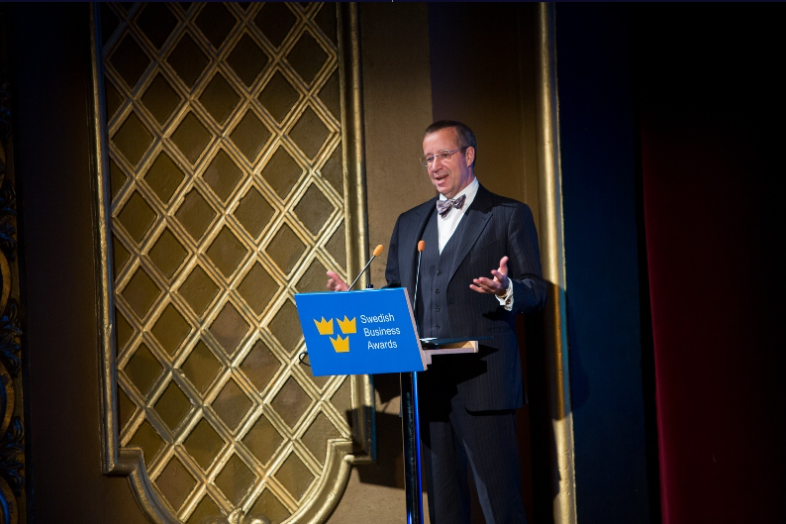
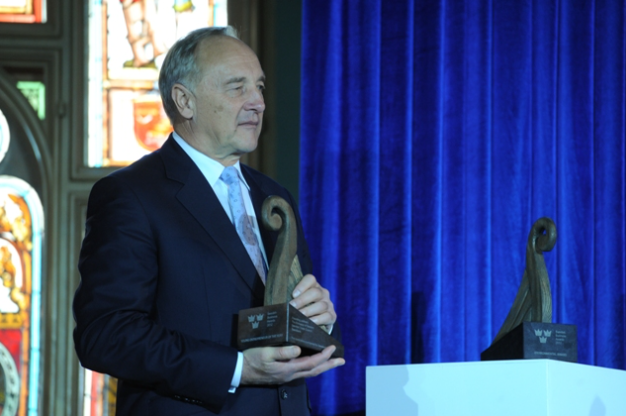
- The Swedish Institute
- Enterprise Estonia
- Investment and Development Agency of Latvia
- Swedish Chamber of Commerce in Estonia
- Swedish Chamber of Commerce in Latvia

The Swedish Trade & Invest Council takes an active role in implementation, while other organizations are active in strategic guidance and implementation of specific aspects.

In 2016, Swedish Business Awards will focus on Technology & Innovation as the key topic of the event.

The event in Lithuania will take place at the Center for Physical Sciences and Technology, Vilnius, on 29 September 2016.

Swedish Business Awards in Latvia are planned to take place at National Library of Latvia, on 13 October 2016.

In Estonia, award ceremony is planned to take place on 18 of October, 2016 at Kumu Art Museum.

== Nominations ==
The awards ceremony honors most successful companies in the following nominations:

=== Sustainable Growth Award ===
Criteria: harmonious development of the company - turnover growth with positive results during previous year and contributions to environmental and social sustainability. Limitation: only companies operating in Lithuania for at least 3 years are to be considered as candidates.

=== Corporate social responsibility ===
Note: In 2011 "Corporate Social Responsibility" nomination name was updated to "Corporate Social Responsibility Initiative of the Year".

Criteria: the most relevant contribution to the development of society in Lithuania. The Swedish Business Awards wish to promote and strengthen the Corporate Social Responsibility (CSR) commitment among corporations. There is a need for greater awareness about CSR and the Swedish Business Awards would like to be a part of that process. The award is an important step to raise the CSR awareness and to attract attention to excellent examples of CSR projects carried out by companies in Lithuania. For this award, the Decision Committee is looking for the organization that can best demonstrate a company-wide commitment to Corporate Social Responsibility (CSR). The Decision Committee is looking for evidence of a clearly defined and effectively communicated CSR strategy that is integrated into the company’s overall business strategy, along with examples of policies or projects that create a positive impact on society in areas such as the environment, employment, education, and charitable initiatives.

=== Young Entrepreneur of the Year ===
Criteria: entrepreneurs under 35 years of age, with good reputation, inspiring and sustainable business that makes an impact to the market or society at large. The nomination was introduced in 2010.

=== Technological Innovation of the Year ===
Criteria: the most remarkable technological innovation that was implemented during 2014 or 2015. The technological innovation can be related to all aspects of the company's or organization's activities: new services, products, or work policies and approaches. The nomination was introduced in Estonia, in 2015.

=== Fastest growing Swedish company ===
Criteria: the highest turnover growth as measured in per cent. Limitation: only Swedish-owned companies can apply for this nomination. Only Swedish owned companies operating in Lithuania, Latvia or Estonia for full 3 years can be considered as candidates in the “Fastest growing Swedish company in Lithuania” nomination category. The award is given to organization that demonstrated the highest annual turnover growth. In 2011 "Fastest growing Swedish company" nomination was replaced by "Sustainable Growth Award".

=== Innovator of the Year ===
Criteria: the most notable innovations in terms of new services, products, or work policies and approaches introduced during the previous year. An openness to new ways of thinking requires curiosity as well as a strong drive and courage to create new rules. The drive comes from an ambition to change, a desire to create and a longing for what feels new. Innovativeness also requires daring to believe in a better future that leads to crossing borders and innovative results. The Swedish Business Awards wishes to encourage innovativeness by emphasizing creativity and braveness to break traditional boundaries. The innovation can be related to all aspects of the company's or organization's activities: new services, products, or work policies and approaches. In 2010 "The Innovator of the Year" nomination was replaced by "The Young Entrepreneur of the Year".

== Hall of fame ==
=== Estonia ===
Sustainable Growth Award:

- Coffee People, 2016
- ETS NORD, 2015
- Greencarrier Freight Services Estonia OÜ, 2014
- Trelleborg, 2013
- Palmse Mehaanikakoda OÜ, 2012
- Põltsamaa Felix, 2011

Fastest growing Swedish company (updated to Sustainable Growth Award in 2011):

- AQ Lasertool, 2010
- Netlead, 2009

Corporate Social Responsibility Initiative of the Year:* Swedbank, 2013

- Microsoft Estonia, Mobile Spring, 2015
- ISS Eesti AS, 2014
- Rimi Eesti Food AS, 2012
- Entrum, 2011
- Law Firm Sorainen, 2010
- ABB, 2009

Young Entrepreneur of the Year:

- Mr. Kristjan Lind, CEO and Co-Founder of Bikeep, 2016
- Ms. Gerli Veermäe, Goworkabit Estonia, 2015
- Mr. Jevgeni Kabanov, 2014
- Mr. Indrek Rebane, Hedgehog OÜ, 2012
- Ms. Lilli Jahilo, 2011
- Ms. Anni Arro, 2010

Innovator of the Year (updated to Young Entrepreneur of the Year in 2010:

- Reklaamilahenduse, 2009

Technology for the Social Progress Award (only in 2013):

- TeliaSonera

Technological Innovation of the Year Award:

- Competence Centre on Health Technologies, 2016
- Skeleton Technologies, 2015

=== Latvia ===
Technological Innovation of the Year Award:

- Mr. Reinis Ādamsons, RORBO, 2016

Sustainable Growth Award:

- Baltic Candles, 2016
- Dinair Filton, 2015
- Dobeles Dzirnavnieks AS, 2014
- Trelleborg, 2013
- Livonia Print, 2012
- Valmieras Stikla Šķiedra, 2011

Fastest growing Swedish company (updated to Sustainable Growth in 2011):

- Gateway Baltic, 2010
- SDI Media Latvia, 2009

Corporate Social Responsibility Initiative of the Year:

- Rimi Latvia, 2015
- Rimi Latvia, 2014
- Swedbank, 2013
- Lattelecom, 2012
- Wooly World, 2011
- Krāsu Serviss and Vairāk Saules, 2010
- CEMEX, 2009

Young Entrepreneur of the Year:

- Ms. Linda Sinka and Ms. Elīna Ingelande, Learn IT, 2016
- Ms. Andra Katkeviča and Ms. Līga Elmane, Gusto SIA, 2015
- Mr. Mikus Opelts, Giraffe Visualization Group SIA, 2014
- Erenpreiss Original, Toms Ērenpreiss and Viesturs Masteiko, 2012
- Mr. Krišs Spūlis, 2011
- INTEA, Mr. R.Freimanis, 2010

Innovator of the Year (updated to Young Entrepreneur of the Year in 2010):

- Groglass, 2008

Technology for the Social Progress Award (only in 2013):

- TeliaSonera

=== Lithuania ===
Technological Innovation of the Year Award:

- prof. dr. Virginijus Šikšnys, 2016

Sustainable Growth Award:

- LT Technologies, 2016
- Enerstena, 2015
- Light Conversion, 2014
- Trelleborg, 2013
- Baldai Jums, 2012
- Altechna, 2011

Fastest growing Swedish company (updated to Sustainable Growth in 2011):

- Systemair, 2010
- Trelleborg Engineered Systems Lithuania, 2009
- ViaCon Baltic, 2008
- Swecon, 2007
- Maxit, 2006

Corporate Social Responsibility Initiative of the Year:

- LESTO, Sustainable School Initiative, 2015
- Project "Connecting Woman", 2014
- Swedbank, 2013
- Servico, Green office, 2012
- The National Student Academy, 2011
- Rimi, 2010
- AVON Cosmetics, 2009
- MTV Networks Baltic, 2008
- SEB Vilniaus Bankas (together with the Lithuanian Children's Foundation), 2007
- TEO LT, 2006

Young Entrepreneur of the Year:

- Mr. Mantas Vizbaras, Mr. Martynas Gudonavičius, Mr. Algimantas Krasauskas, Mr. Jurgis Pašukonis, TRAFI, 2016
- Dr. Austėja Landsbergienė, Vaikystės Sodas, 2015
- Mr. Aurelijus Liubinas, Friday Lab, 2014
- Kristijonas, Augustinas and Dominykas Vizbaras, Brolis Semiconductors, 2012
- Mr. Karolis Verbliugevičius, 2011
- Mr. Daumantas Mikučionis, 2010

Innovator of the Year (updated to Young Entrepreneur of the Year in 2010):

- Sicor Biotech, 2008
- Gambro Healthcare Lietuva, 2007
- Omnitel, 2006

Business IQ of the Year (only in 2012):

- Ekspla

Technology for the Social Progress Award (only in 2013):

- TeliaSonera
