= Unity Ride in Latvia =

Cycling race in Latvia

Vienības brauciens
Race details
- Date: September
- Region: Latvia
- Discipline: Road, Mountain bike racing
- Organiser: Igo Japiņš agency of sport
- Web site: www.velo.lv

History
- First edition: 1936
- Editions: 24

The Unity Ride (Latvian: Vienības brauciens) is an annual bicycle race held in Latvia. The race was first organized in 1936, endorsed by the President of Latvia, currently run by the Igo Japiņš agency of sport.

== History ==
During the decade of the 1930s cycling sport in Latvia was very popular. At that time the popularity of the sport was further boosted by the Unity Rides which were endorsed by the President of Latvia Kārlis Ulmanis. The first race was organized in 1936 and 1214 cyclists from all regions of Latvia took part in the first Unity Ride.

The ride finished in Riga. The second Unity Ride in 1937, with 1301 participants finished in Jelgava. The Third Unity Ride in 1938 finished in Riga with 1329 competitors while 6225 cyclists competed in fourth - and the last Unity Ride in independent Latvia.

This annual event had achieved unprecedented success and had raised the profile of sports nationwide. The biggest champions in these races were Alma Lieģe-Lasi and Arvīds Immermanis. In the Unity Ride participants and winners were rewarded with prizes - new bicycles from the biggest bicycle factories at that time - G. Ērenpreis Bicycle Factory, Latvello, Lipperts, Omega, Līva bicycle factories, as well as cups, medals, special prizes by local municipalities and other.

World War II and occupation of Latvia stopped organizing Unity Rides until year 1995, when Unity Ride was renewed. It was initiated by cycling club "Marss" coach Ernests Pūce and supported by the President of Latvia Guntis Ulmanis.

== Nowadays ==
In nowadays the race is divided in three distances - road racing, mountain bike racing and popular ride for families and enthusiasts. In the Unity Ride mostly there are Latvian professional cyclists who participate, but in 2013 worldwide known foreigner cyclists participated: Mark Cavendish, Rolf Aldag, Brian Holm and Jaan Kirsipuu.
