= Ukraine (bicycle) =

USSR men's road bicycle brand

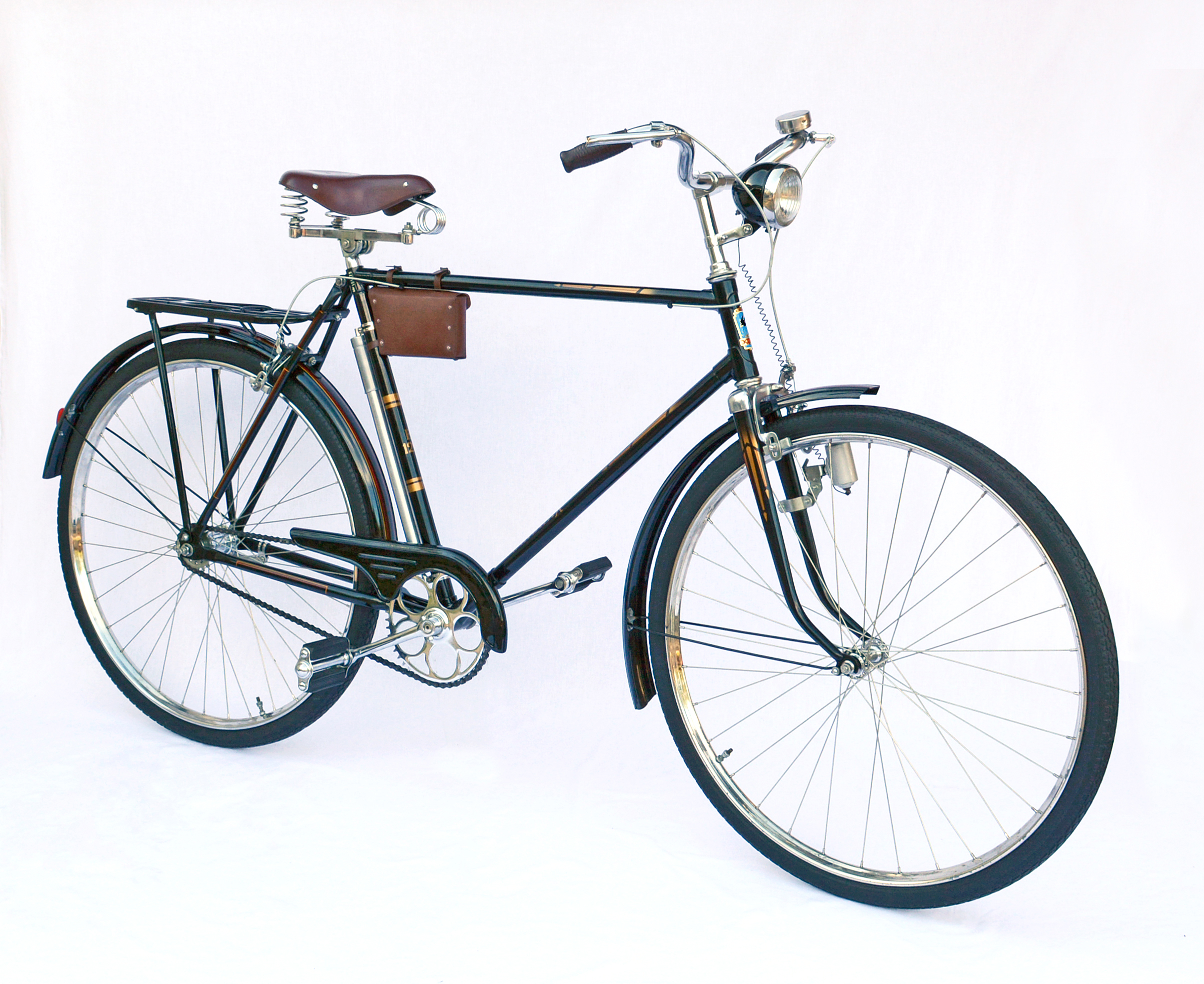
Bicycle HVZ "Ukraine" B-120. The first model of the post-war series "Ukraine" made in 1960, equipped with additional hand brakes

"Ukraine" — a series of men's road bicycles produced by the Kharkiv Bicycle Plant. The most popular brand of bicycle produced in the USSR. Bicycle models "Ukraine" were in constant demand not only in the USSR, but also were successfully exported to more than 30 countries.

== History ==
During the First World War, Leitner's bicycle factory in Riga was moved to Kharkiv. After the October Bolshevik coup of 1917, it was nationalized, and in 1923 the Kharkiv Bicycle Plant named after GI Petrovsky was founded on its basis.

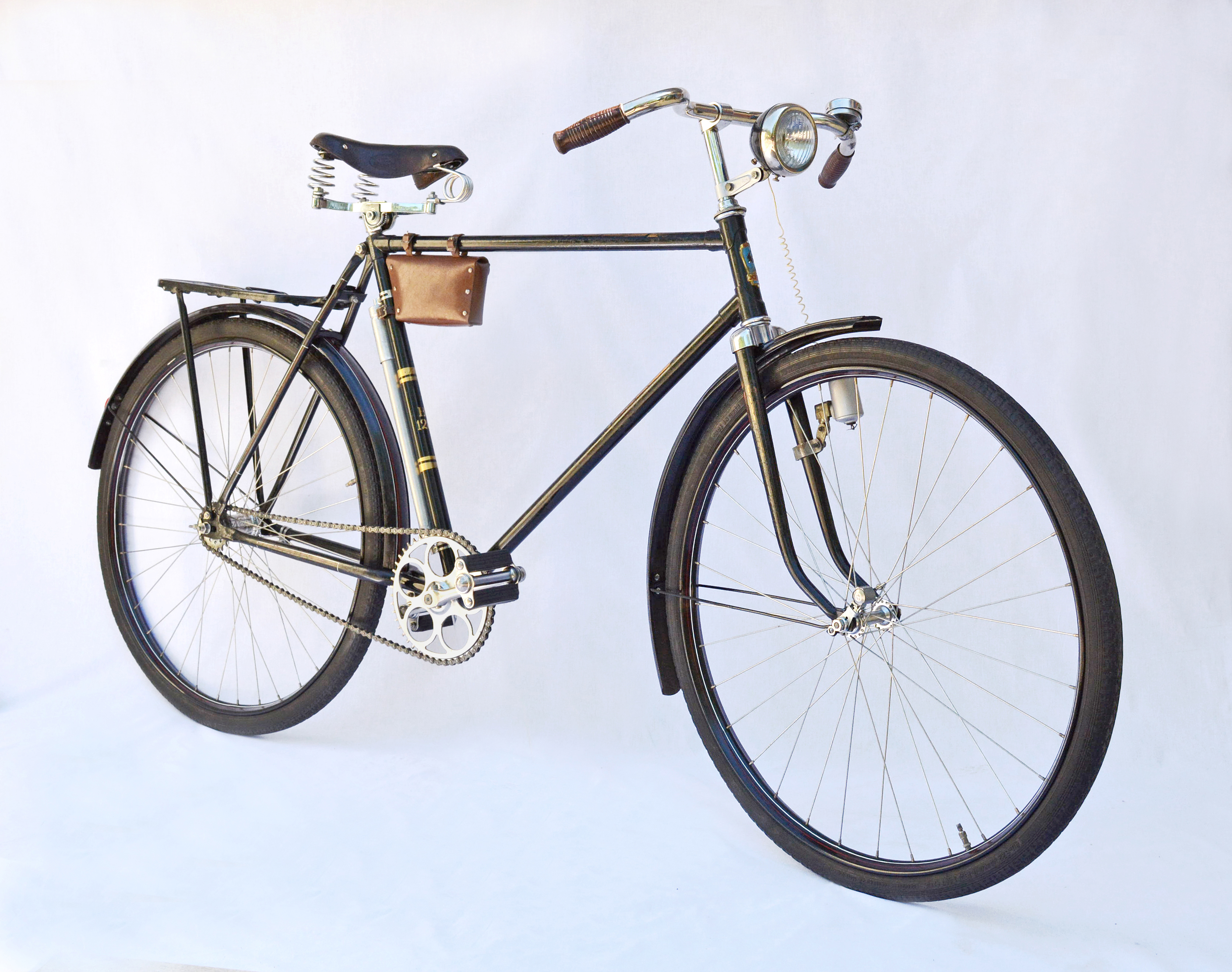
Bicycle "Ukraine" B-120, serial model of production of 1961

In 1926, the production of a men's road bicycle was established, which was named "Ukraine". It was a model of a bicycle produced by Leitner's factory in pre-revolutionary times. Information on the design and number of bicycles produced is not known.

== General features of the models ==
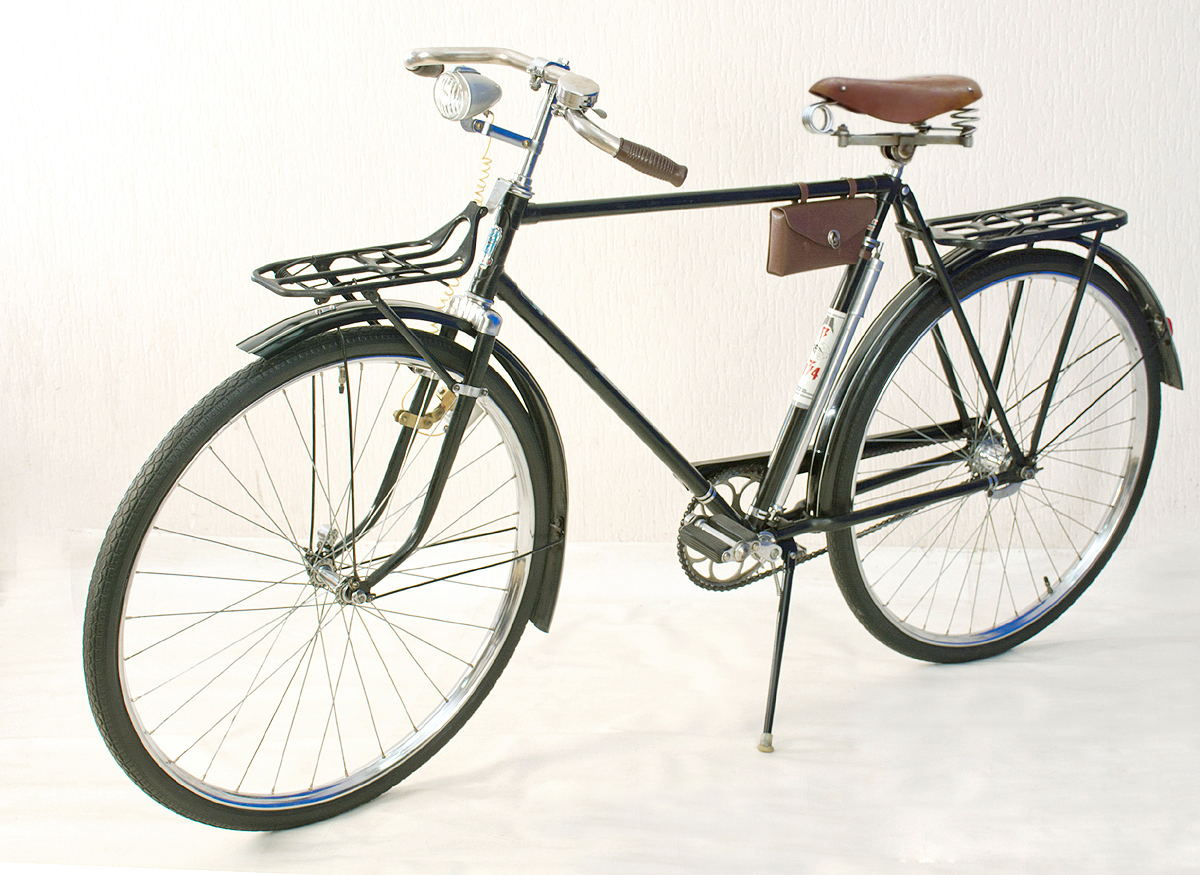
Men's road bicycle "Ukraine" B-134, manufactured in 1969 in complete set

With the exception of some modifications, all "Ukraine" bikes were equipped with a coaster brake HVZ type "Torpedo". Initially, a star and the inscription "Kharkiv" (in two versions) were embossed on the hub shell, later on replaced by only the inscription "Kharkiv" in capital letters, and finally only the abbreviation "HVZ". After approximately 1974, the hub shell ceased to be equipped with a lubrication valve. The inscription "HVZ" was stamped on the front hub.

All HVZ "Ukraine" bicycles were stamped with the serial number and year of manufacture on the right side of the frame. In some models, the number was also duplicated on the rear dropout.

As a rule, "Ukraine" bicycles were delivered for sale in a standard set, which included: a bag with tools, a first-aid kit, a rear rack, a bell and a pump. Additionally, it was offered with a front rack, stand, odometer, mirror, front wheel brake and headlight. There were also deliveries of bicycles equipped with all the accessories from the factory.

As an example the cost of a B-134 bicycle without additional equipment in 1969 was 51 Rbls. 70 kop.

In 1966, HVZ produced its 10 millionth bicycles: it was a model "Ukraine" B-130, and in 1979 a 20th million bicycle came off the assembly line. At the time of the collapse of the USSR, this figure had already reached 30 million.

== See also ==
- Bicycle
- Motorized bicycle

== Sources ==
- Керівництва по експлуатації велосипедів В-120, В-134 «Україна»
- Каневский, А. И.; Привалов, А. И. (1990). Первенец советского велостроения (PDF). Kharkiv: Прапор. ISBN 5-7766-6263-7. Archived from the original (PDF) on 21 September 2017.
- Пустовалов В. И., Майборода В. М., Камеристый В. В. Справочник велосипедиста. Харьков: Прапор, 1976.
- Віктор Ходєєв, Велосипеды «Украина»
- ХВЗ Украина 1926 / самый первый велосипед ХВЗ
