= List of international prime ministerial trips made by Kristen Michal =

This is a list of international prime ministerial trips made by Kristen Michal, the current Prime Minister of Estonia since 23 July 2024.

== Summary ==
Michal has visited 21 countries during his tenure as prime minister. The number of visits per country where Michal has traveled are:

- One visit to Albania, Armenia, Austria, Croatia, Cyprus, Hungary, Italy, Montenegro, Netherlands, Norway, Sweden and Turkey
- Two visits to Denmark and Lithuania
- Three visits to France, and Poland
- Four visits to Germany and Latvia and Ukraine
- Five visits to Finland
- Fourteen visits to Belgium

== 2024 ==
Country	Location(s)	Dates	Details
Finland	Helsinki	14 August	Michal met with his Finnish counterpart Petteri Orpo and President Alexander Stubb.
Lithuania	Klaipėda, Palanga	17–18 August	Met with Latvian prime minister Evika Siliņa and Lithuanian prime minister Ingrida Šimonytė. During their meeting, the heads of government focused mainly on strengthening regional security, but also discussed cooperation in the transport and energy sectors, support for Ukraine, and the tightening of sanctions against Russia.
Belgium	Brussels	16–18 October	Attended the European Council Meeting. Met with President of the European Council, Charles Michel.
Latvia	Riga	1 November	Michal met with Prime Minister Evika Siliņa to discuss their two countries’ shared priorities in the EU and NATO, support for Ukraine, progress in Baltic energy and transport projects and ways of expanding bilateral cooperation.
Hungary	Budapest	7 November	Michal attended the 5th European Political Community Summit.
Lithuania	Vilnius	22 November	Met with Latvian prime minister Evika Siliņa and Lithuanian prime minister Ingrida Šimonytė. They discussed the protection of critical maritime infrastructure, countering hybrid threats, continued support for Ukraine, and joint energy and transport projects.
Sweden	Harpsund, Stockholm	26–28 November	Attended the Baltic-Nordic Heads of Government Summit hosted by Swedish prime minister Ulf Kristersson. He met with Finnish prime minister Petteri Orpo, Danish prime minister Mette Frederiksen, Norwegian prime minister Jonas Gahr Støre, Icelandic prime minister Bjarni Benediktsson, Lithuanian prime minister Ingrida Šimonytė, Latvian foreign minister Baiba Braže and also invited Polish prime minister Donald Tusk at the official summer residence in Harpsund, 94 km from Stockholm, where the security situation in the Baltic Sea region and Ukraine and transatlantic relations were discussed. On the evening of 26 November, Kristen Michal met with local large investors in Stockholm to give them an overview of her government's activities and priorities in stimulating the Estonian economic environment.
France	Paris	5–7 December	Kristen Michal met with French president Emmanuel Macron in Paris, where the focus was on supporting Ukraine and improving the European Union's defense and competitiveness.
Ukraine	Kyiv	9 December	Met with Ukrainian president Volodymyr Zelenskyy, Prime Minister Denys Shmyhal, and Ruslan Stefanchuk, Speaker of the Ukrainian parliament
Poland	Warsaw	11 December	Met with his Polish counterpart Donald Tusk. The main topics of the meeting will be support for Ukraine, the Polish Presidency of the Council of the European Union and defence cooperation, both bilateral and within NATO.
Belgium	Brussels	18–19 December	Attended the European Council Meeting.
Germany	Berlin	19–20 December	Late in the evening of December 19, Kristen Michal, together with federal chancellor Olaf Scholz, flew to Berlin on a German state aircraft Airbus A319-133X CJ (German Air Force reg. 15 + 01) directly from the European Council meeting in Brussels. On the morning of December 20, Kristen Michal met with federal chancellor of the Federal Republic of Germany Olaf Scholz in Berlin, where bilateral relations, support for Ukraine, regional security and European Union issues were discussed.

== 2025 ==
Country	Location(s)	Dates	Details
Finland	Helsinki	14 January	Michal attended the Baltic Sea NATO Allies Summit in Helsinki. He also met with President of Finland Alexander Stubb, Prime Minister of Poland Donald Tusk, NATO Secretary General Mark Rutte, and Vice-president of the European Commission Henna Virkkunen.
Belgium	Brussels	3 February	Attended an informal meeting of the European Council in Brussels today to discuss the enhancement of European defence readiness, its financing, and defence and security cooperation with NATO and the United Kingdom.
Ukraine	Kyiv	24 February	Michal travelled to Kyiv to mark the third anniversary of the Russian invasion of Ukraine.
Belgium	Brussels	6–7 March	Participate in the extraordinary meeting of the European Council
Belgium	Brussels	20 March	Participation in the European Council working session
France	Paris	27 March	Michal attended a meeting of the "Coalition of the willing" hosted by President Macron.
Norway	Oslo	9 May	Michal attended the 2025 Joint Expeditionary Force summit.
Albania	Tirana	16 May	Michal attended the 6th European Political Community Summit.
Latvia	Riga	30 May	Met with Latvian prime minister Evika Siliņa and Lithuanian prime minister Gintautas Paluckas. They focused on three main topics: advancing infrastructure projects, enhancing regional security — including expectations for the upcoming NATO summit — and supporting Ukraine.
Netherlands	The Hague	24–25 June	Michal attended the 2025 NATO summit
Belgium	Brussels	26 June	Participation in the European Council
Croatia	Zagreb	8 July	Kristen Michal met with President Zoran Milanović, Prime Minister Andrej Plenković, and Croatian Parliament Speaker Gordan Jandroković in Zagreb, where they discussed strengthening defense and business cooperation, common goals in the European Union and NATO, and continued support for Ukraine.
Italy	Rome	10–11 July	Participation in the Ukraine Recovery Conference.
Latvia	Riga	19–20 July	Michal met with his Lithuanian counterpart Gintautas Paluckas and his Latvian counterpart Evika Siliņa, who hosted the meeting.
Latvia	Riga	29 August	Kristen Michal flew a Diamond Sky airliner Pilatus PC-12/47E NGX (reg. ES-SAS and flight number DMS611) to Riga Airport at the invitation of Prime Minister Evika Siliņa. Kristen Michal, together with Latvian prime minister Evika Siliņa, attended the festive reception of the Estonian Basketball Federation in Estonian Embassy and the Estonia vs. Latvia EuroBasket 2025 game in Riga. Kristen Michal flew a Diamond Sky airliner Pilatus PC-12/47E NGX (reg. ES-SAS and flight number DMS611) back to Tallinn Airport.
Denmark	Copenhagen	3 September	Met with Prime Minister Mette Frederiksen, President Volodymyr Zelenskyy and other leaders. Attended the Nordic-Baltic Eight summit.
Denmark	Copenhagen	2 October	Attended the 7th European Political Community Summit.
Belgium	Brussels	22–24 October	Attended the 252nd European Council summit.
Germany	Berlin	27–28 November	On 27 November, Michal met with Federal Chancellor of the Federal Republic of Germany Friedrich Merz and German Minister of Economic Affairs and Energy Katherina Reiche in Berlin, where they discussed joint efforts to stop Russian aggression and ensure European security, including strengthening the defense of the European Union and NATO's eastern flank. In the evening, Kristen Michal met with German investors interested in cooperation with Estonia at the Estonian Embassy in Berlin. On 28 November, Kristen Michal participated with Minister-president of Saxony Michael Kretschmer in the opening of the Skeleton Technologies factory in Markranstädt near Leipzig.
Latvia	Riga	12 December	Michal met with Latvian prime minister Evika Siliņa and Lithuanian prime minister Inga Ruginienė at the Baltic Council of Ministers in Riga, where they discussed current regional security issues, the progress of the Rail Baltic project, as well as the mutual interests of the Baltic states in the European Union's next multi-annual budget.
Finland	Helsinki	16 December	Met with Prime Minister Petteri Orpo, Swedish prime minister Ulf Kristersson, Latvian prime minister Evika Siliņa, Lithuanian president Gitanas Nausėda, Polish prime minister Donald Tusk, Romanian president Nicușor Dan and Bulgarian prime minister Rosen Zhelyazkov at the Eastern Front Summit in Helsinki, where the discussion focused on Europe securing its Eastern Front at a faster pace and through joint initiatives.
Belgium	Brussels	17–18 December	Attended the European Council and European Union-Western Balkans Leaders' Summit. The discussion focused on the strength of the strategic relationship between the EU and the Western Balkans and the benefits it offers to their citizens and on the next day when the next EU multiannual budget, security and defense, and economic challenges were discussed, including the use of frozen Russian assets in the Ukraine support plan.

== 2026 ==
Country	Location(s)	Dates	Details
France	Paris	6 January	Michal attended the Coalition of the Willing meeting in Paris with fellow leaders.
Belgium	Brussels	22 January	Kristen Michal met at an extraordinary meeting of the European Council in this evening with other leaders. Discussion was on developments in transatlantic relations, their impact on the European Union and the situation related to Greenland, and the continued relentless pressure on Russia.
Belgium	Antwerp, Rijkhoven	11-12 February	Michal attended the 3rd European Industry Summit. Next day participated in the informal meeting of EU heads of state and government.
Germany	Munich	13–16 February	Michal attended the first day of the 62nd Munich Security Conference.
Ukraine	Kyiv	24 February	Michal travelled to Kyiv to meet President Volodymyr Zelenskyy and join Nordic-Baltic leaders in the coalition of the willing to mark the fourth anniversary of Russia’s full-scale invasion.
Belgium	Brussels	25-26 February	Met with European Commission president Ursula von der Leyen, they opened a high-level conference on supporting the EU's border regions in Brussels. At the high-level conference on the EU's eastern border countries in Brussels, met with European Council president António Costa, Latvian prime minister Evika Siliņa and Lithuanian prime minister Inga Ruginienė, where she highlighted the central role of the countries in ensuring Europe's security, resilience and stability and highlighted the importance of the countries in ensuring their security, resilience and stability. At the end of the conference, a declaration of intent to establish the EastInvest Facility, a financing platform for the countries of the eastern border region, will be signed.
Belgium	Brussels	19–20 March	Michal attended the European Council. discussion was to strengthen the internal security of the European Union. To impose a uniform entry ban on Russian fighters who fought in Ukraine into the Schengen area.
Finland	Helsinki	26 March	Michal attended the 2026 JEF Leaders’ Summit.
Cyprus	Nicosia	23–24 April	Michal attended an informal meeting of the European Council summit, where the conflict in Iran, the Middle East, Ukraine and energy prices and the financial framework for 2028–2034, i.e. the EU's long-term budget , were discussed. Kristen Michal with the heads of state and government at Agia Napa Marina for dinner. He met with invited leaders President of Lebanon Nawaf Salam, President of Syria Ahmed al-Sharaa, Minister of Foreign Affairs and Expatriates of Syria Ayman Safadi, President of Egypt Abdel Fattah el-Sisi, Crown Prince of Jordan Hussein bin Abdullah, Minister of Foreign Affairs of Jordan Ayman Safadi, Secretary-General of the Gulf Cooperation Council Jasem Mohamed Al-Budaiwi, discussing the situation in the Middle East, common challenges and emerging opportunities for cooperation.
Armenia	Yerevan	3–4 May	Michal attended the 8th European Political Community Summit.
Montenegro	Kotor, Tivat	4–6 June	On the evening of June 4, Michal attended a working dinner hosted by the president Jakov Milatović, in Kotor. On 5 June, at the EU - Western Balkans Summit in Tivat, Kristen Michal met with the president of Montenegro Jakov Milatović, the prime minister of Montenegro Milojko Spajić, the president of the European Commission Ursula von der Leyen, the president of the European Council António Costa, the president of the European Parliament Roberta Metsola, the secretary-general of the Council of the European Union Thérèse Blanchet, the president of France Emmanuel Macron, the president of Lithuania Gitanas Nausėda, the president of Romania Nicușor Dan, the president of Greece Konstantinos Tasoulas, the president of Cyprus Nikos Christodoulides, the president of Serbia Aleksandar Vučić, the prime minister of the Czech Republic Andrej Babiš, the prime minister of Slovakia Robert Fico, the prime minister of Croatia Andrej Plenković, the prime minister of Belgium Bart De Wever, the prime minister of Ireland Micheál Martin, the prime minister of the Netherlands Rob Jetten, the prime minister of Spain Pedro Sánchez, the prime minister of Portugal Luís Montenegro, the prime minister of Luxembourg Luc Frieden, the prime minister of Slovenia Janez Janša, Polish prime minister Donald Tusk, Bulgarian prime minister Rumen Radev, Maltese prime minister Robert Abela, Danish prime minister Mette Frederiksen, Austrian chancellor Christian Stocker, North Macedonian prime minister Hristijan Mickoski, Albanian prime minister Edi Rama and Bosnia and Herzegovina Presidency Chairman Denis Bećirović, where the discussion focused on the enlargement of the European Union and regional security. After the summit, Kristen Michal introduced the old town, the beach and the museum of Tivat.
Belgium	Brussels	18–19 June	Attended the European Council, where the discussion focused on Ukraine and the enlargement of the European Union, the new long-term budget of the European Union (MFF), the Middle East and China. On the morning of 19 June, Kristen Michal represented the European Council in Brussels at the summit, where the EU budget for 2028-2034 was discussed.
Poland	Gdańsk	24–26 June	Kristen Michal met with Polish prime minister Donald Tusk, Ukrainian prime minister Yulia Svyridenko, European Commission president Ursula von der Leyen, European Council president António Costa, Lithuanian president Gitanas Nausėda, Latvian prime minister Andris Kulbergs, Czech Prime Minister Andrej Babiš, Slovak prime minister Robert Fico, Moldovan prime minister Alexandru Munteanu, Albanian prime minister Edi Rama, Bulgarian prime minister Rumen Radev, Finnish prime minister Petteri Orpo, Federal chancellor of the Federal Republic of Germany Friedrich Merz, Federal chancellor of the Republic of Austria Christian Stocker and President of the Presidency of Bosnia and Herzegovina Denis Bećirović, where the topic of security and reconstruction was discussed. The Ukrainian Reconstruction Conference included Foreign Minister Margus Tsahkna, Minister of Social Affairs Karmen Joller, Minister of Finance Jürgen Ligi and Minister of Infrastructure Kuldar Leis. On the morning of next day, Kristen Michal met with Polish prime minister Donald Tusk, European Commission president Ursula von der Leyen, Lithuanian president Gitanas Nausėda, Romanian president Nicușor Dan, Latvian prime minister Andris Kulbergs, Finnish prime minister Petteri Orpo and European Commissioner for Defence and Space Andrius Kubilius at the East Wing Summit, with the aim of accelerating the financing and implementation of critical infrastructure protection and military mobility projects. In the afternoon, he participated in the opening of the Estonian stand in the conference fairgrounds, where Estonian companies and organizations will present their activities in the reconstruction of Ukraine.
Germany	Berlin	3 July	In the morning, Kristen Michal visited the Estonian Embassy. In the afternoon, Kristen Michal, together with Latvian president Edgars Rinkēvičs and Lithuanian president Gitanas Nausėda, met with Federal Chancellor of the Federal Republic of Germany Friedrich Merz in a B3+1 format in Berlin, where they discussed close cooperation in supporting Ukraine, protecting Europe's eastern flank, and in the field of the defense industry, in order to coordinate positions before the NATO Ankara Summit.
Austria	Vienna	3–4 July	On the afternoon of July 3, Kristen Michal met in with the federal chancellor Christian Stocker, the Austrian minister for Europe and international affairs, Beate Meinl-Reisinger, and the deputy speaker of the Ukrainian Parliament, Oleksandr Korniyenko, to discuss cooperation to achieve a just and lasting peace in Ukraine, as well as cooperation within the European Union more broadly. On July 4, Kristen Michal attended the ALDE congress.
Turkey	Ankara	7–8 July	On first day at lunchtime, Kristen Michal and her partner Evelin Oras visited the Turkish defense industry company Nurol Makinas, where they introduced Turkish-built wheeled armored vehicles. In the afternoon, Kristen Michal, along with Foreign Minister Margus Tsahkna and Defense Minister Hanno Pevkur, met with Ukrainian president Volodymyr Zelenskyy on the sidelines of the NATO summit, where they signed a drone agreement, marking an important step in deepening defense cooperation between Estonia and Ukraine. In the evening, Michal and her partner Evelin Oras attended a dinner in Ankara for NATO heads of state and government and their associates hosted by Turkish president Recep Tayyip Erdoğan and First Lady Emine Erdoğan. Michal attended the 2026 Ankara NATO summit, during which discussions were held on strengthening collective defense, including meeting defense spending targets, developing the defense industry, and supporting Ukraine, given that Russia was a long-term threat to the alliance.
France	Paris	13–14 July	Michal attended coalition of the willing meeting, met with leaders and the aim of contributing a company-sized unit, instructors and staff officers. In the afternoon, Kristen Michal unveiled a commemorative plaque for the Baltic Chain in Paris with Latvian prime minister Andris Kulbergs, Deputy Speaker of the Lithuanian Parliament Rasa Budbergytė, French Minister of European Affairs and Foreign Affairs Jean-Noël Barrot, and Mayor of Paris Emmanuel Grégoire. In the evening, Kristen Michal and her partner Evelin Oras attended a dinner hosted by French president Emmanuel Macron and the first lady Brigitte Macron at the Élysée Palace for heads of state and government and their entourage. On next day, Kristen Michal participated in the French National Day parade, the anniversary of the storming of the Bastille, with other heads of state and government, where she also met with Italian president Sergio Mattarella.
Ukraine	Kyiv	23 August	Kristen Michal, together with Lithuanian president Gitanas Nausėda, Finnish president Alexander Stubb, Latvian prime minister Andris Kulbergs, Danish prime minister Mette Frederiksen and Norwegian prime minister Jonas Gahr Støre, met unannounced with Ukrainian president Volodymyr Zelenskyy and Ukrainian prime minister Serhii Koretskyi on the sidelines of the NB8 summit in Kyiv to discuss winter preparations, protection and restoration of key energy infrastructure, and preparations for the Ukrainian reconstruction conference to be held in Tallinn in January next year. Kristen Michal and the leaders participated in events related to the Ukrainian National Flag Day.
Finland	Rovaniemi	13–14 September	On September 13, Kristen Michal met with the President of Finland Alexander Stubb, the President of Romania Nicușor Dan, the Prime Minister of Finland Petteri Orpo, the Prime Minister of Norway Jonas Gahr Støre, the Prime Minister of Iceland Kristrún Frostadóttir, the Prime Minister of Latvia Andris Kulbergs, the Minister of Foreign Affairs of France Jean-Noël Barrot, the President of the European Council António Costa, the High Representative of the European Union for Foreign Affairs and Security Policy Kaja Kallas, the Commissioner for International Partnerships Jozef Síkela and the Federal Chancellor of the Federal Republic of Germany Friedrich Merz at the European Arctic Summit working dinner in Rovaniemi, where they attended the working dinner. On the morning of September 14, Kristen Michal visited the Lapland Air Force Wing. In the afternoon, Kristen Michal participated in the European Arctic Summit, which discussed the growing geopolitical importance of the Arctic region and the strengthening of the role of the European Union. The summit was attended by the President of Finland, Alexander Stubb, the President of Romania, Nicușor Dan, the President of Lithuania, Gitanas Nausėda, the Prime Minister of Finland, Petteri Orpo, the Prime Minister of Denmark, Mette Frederiksen ans others.
Belgium	Brussels	14–16 October	Michal attended the European Council.

== Future trips ==
Country	Location	Date	Details
Hungary	Budapest	22-23 October	Michael' is with President Ulle Madise expected to attend the 70th Anniversary Commemoration Ceremony Hungarian Revolution of 1956.
Ireland	Dublin	12 November	Michael' is plan to attend the 9th European Political Community Summit.

== Multilateral meetings ==
Kristen Michal participated in the following summits during his premiership:

Group	Year			
Group	2024	2025	2026	2027
NATO		24–25 June, (Netherlands) The Hague	7–8 July, (Turkey) Ankara	
Ukraine Recovery Conference		10–11 July, (Italy) Rome	25–26 June, (Poland) Gdańsk	27–28 January, (Estonia) Tallinn
EPC	7 November, (Hungary) Budapest	16 May, (Albania) Tirana	4 May, (Armenia) Yerevan	
EPC	7 November, (Hungary) Budapest	2 October, (Denmark) Copenhagen	12 November, (Republic of Ireland) Dublin	
JEF	17 December, (Estonia) Tallinn	9 May, (Norway) Oslo	26 March, (Finland) Helsinki	26 March, (Iceland) Reykjavík
Others	None	Building a robust peace for Ukraine and Europe; 27 March, (France) Paris	Together for peace and security summit 6 January, (France) Paris	
Others	None	Building a robust peace for Ukraine and Europe; 27 March, (France) Paris	Determined to act 13 July, (France) Paris	
██ = Future event.
