= G. Ērenpreis Bicycle Factory =

Company based in Riga, Latvia

G. Ērenpreis velosipēdu fabrika
- Industry: bicycles
- Founded: 1927
- Founder: Gustavs Ērenpreis
- Defunct: 1942
- Headquarters: Riga, Latvia

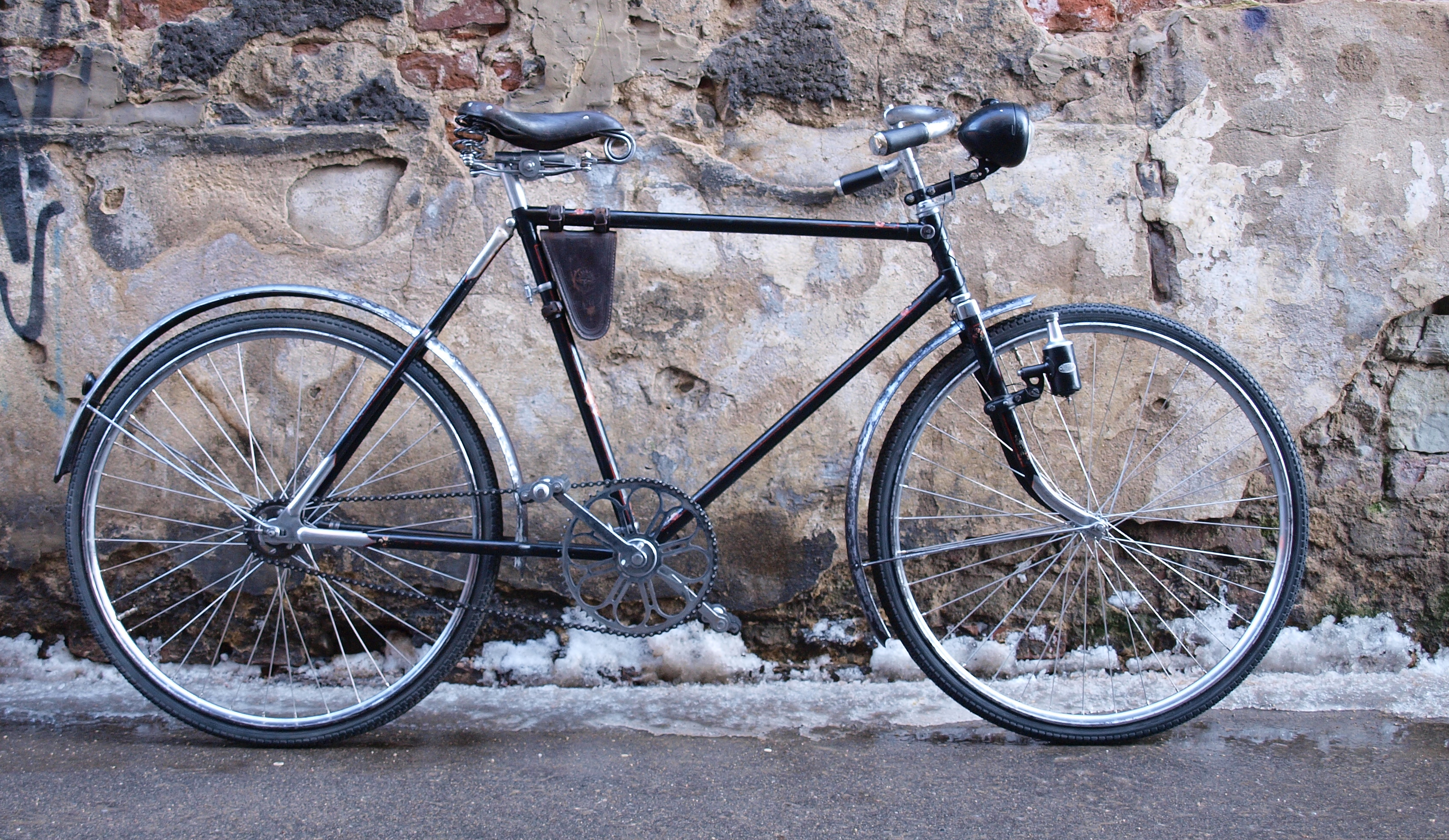
G. Ērenpreis gent bicycle, manufactured in 1940

Gustavs Ērenpreis Bicycle Factory (Latvian: Gustava Ērenpreisa velosipēdu fabrika) was a manufacturer of bicycles and bicycle parts in Riga, Latvia. The factory was founded in 1927 and continued in private operation until 1942. Prior to World War II it grew to become the largest and most important bicycle factory in the Baltic States. After the war, the factory was nationalized by the Soviet Union and became the largest bicycle factory in the Latvian SSR as the Red Star Riga Bicycle Factory.

== History ==
=== Background ===
G. Ērenpreis Baltija bicycle head-badge, manufactured in 1921

From the beginning of 20th Century, cycling was a popular and growing sport in Latvia, leading to a competitive bicycle manufacturing industry in that country.

The Gustavs Ērenpreis Bicycle Factory was established in 1927 by master Latvian bicycle manufacturer Gustavs Ērenpreis (1891–1956).

Ērenpreis' path to establish his own factory was long and complicated. In 1907, he started to work at the Eduards Bērziņš bicycle workshop in Riga, which produced bicycles and repaired and sold English Triumph and Douglas motorcycles in the Baltic States. During World War I the workshop was evacuated to Harkov.

In 1921, following the end of the war, Ērenpreis launched his own workshop, where in the first years he repaired and sold abandoned military transport of the Bermont army. He moved into manufacturing the following year as the "G. Ērenpreis Motorcycle and Bicycle Workshop", where he manufactured his own first bicycles under the "Baltija" label.

Due to rapid expansion, a lack of space soon became problematic, and in 1924 the Ērenpreis workshop moved to a larger space - a former Alexander Leutner Bicycle factory premises. In 1926, Gustavs Ērenpreis and his business partners established a joint-stock company called Omega, but this entity was ultimately abandoned that same year.

=== Launch ===
G. Ērenpreis bicycle head-badge, manufactured in 1927.

These first manufacturing efforts are regarded as preliminary to the actual establishment of a new manufacturing entity called the G. Ērenpreis Bicycle Factory in 1927. The new firm continued in its previous quarters until, in 1931, construction began on a new, modern bicycle factory located on Brīvības Street, and designed by architect Aleksandrs Klinklāvs. By 1937, the factory had become the largest manufacturer of bicycles in the Baltic States.

In 1938, G. Ērenpreis factory opened the most modern nickel and chrome plating department in Latvia, with automatic work tables and special machines for producing freewheel hubs and other mechanic bicycle parts. During the late 1930s the Ērenpreis factory produced approximately 40,000 bicycles per year, with the total number produced hitting the 200,000 mark in 1940 — about 70% of all bicycles produced in Latvia at that time. The G. Ērenpreis bicycle factory exported bicycles to Lithuania, Estonia, Poland, Finland, and the Soviet Union.

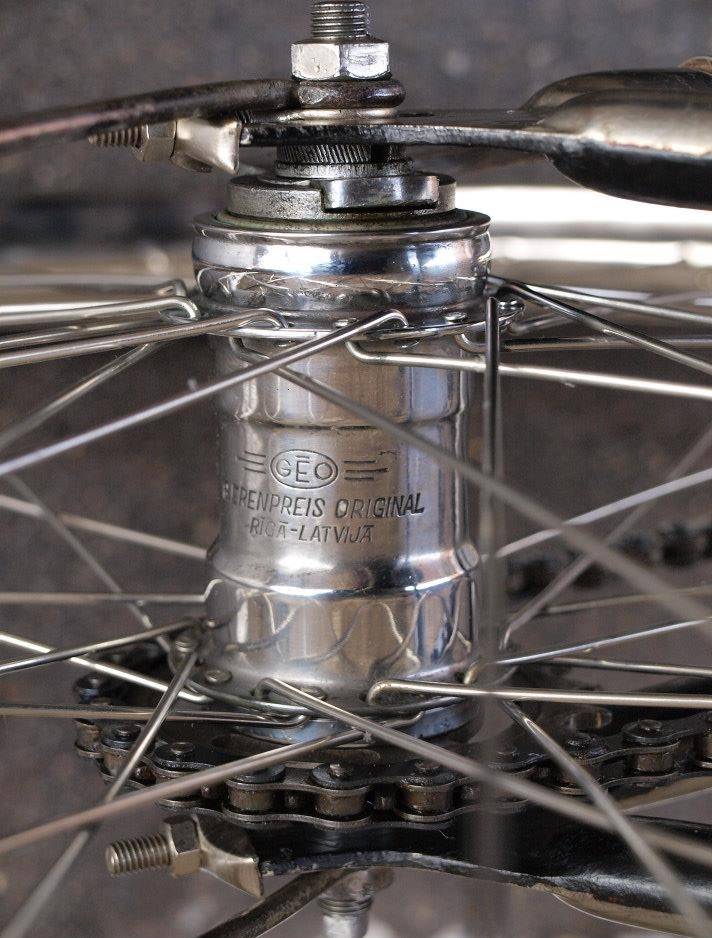
G. Ērenpreis bicycle freewheel hub, manufactured in 1939

In addition to being the largest Latvian bicycle manufacture of its day, the G. Ērenpreis bicycle factory was regarded as the source of the highest quality bikes for Latvian competitive cyclists.

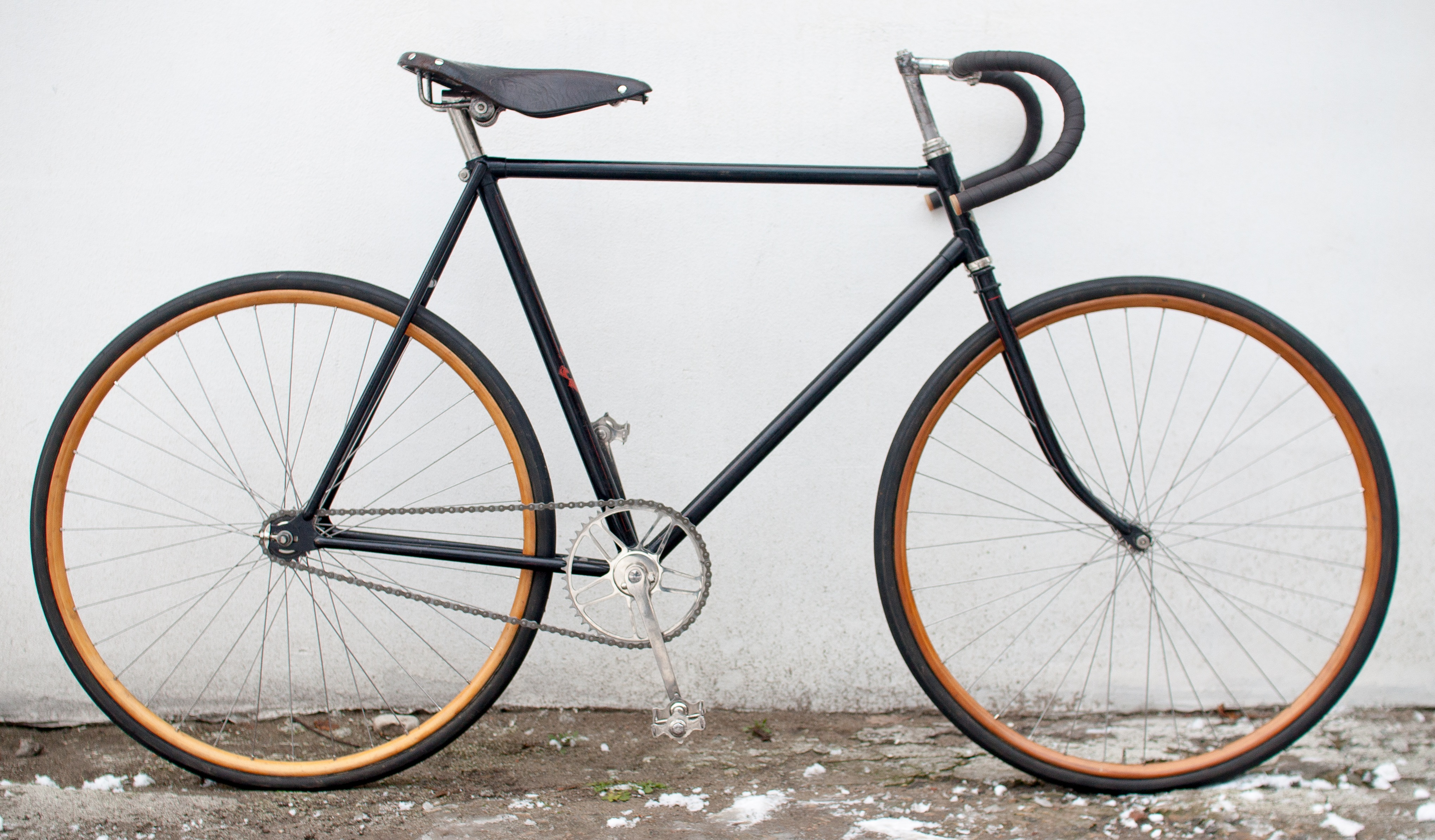
G. Ērenpreis race bicycle, manufactured in 1936

G. Ērenpreis bicycles were ridden by the top Latvian cyclists of the era, including Olympic cyclists Arvīds Immermanis and Andrejs Apsītis.

G. Ērenpreis bicycles were well represented in Latvia's premier national bicycle race of the 1930s, the Unity Ride, in which Immermanis won first place on a G. Ērenpreis bicycle in three of four attempts.

=== Nationalization and legacy ===
Early in the 1940s, Riga city planners predicted that by 1990 there would be 5 times more bicycles in Latvia than were currently ridden. The city plan was thus modified for cycling infrastructure development. Prospects appeared good for the Ērenpreis firm.

Unfortunately, World War II and the occupation of Latvia halted work at the G. Ērenpreis bicycle factory. The Ērenpreis company was nationalized by the USSR and re-christened the Red Star Riga Bicycle Factory (Rīgas Velosipēdu rūpnīca (RVR) "Sarkanā Zvaigzne"). Bicycle production continued at that company until 1963, when the factory was retooled and converted to the production of mopeds.

Gustavs Ērenpreis emigrated from Latvia to West Germany, where he remained until his death in 1956.

Today G. Ērenpreis bicycles are exhibited at the Riga Motor Museum and Bicycle Museum in Ligatne as part of the country's industrial heritage and the factory building in Riga is listed as an Industrial Heritage historical site of Latvia.

In 2012 the brand was revived by Gustavs Ērenpreis' great-grandnephew, Toms Ērenpreiss, who manufactures new Ērenpreiss bicycles.
