= AI Gigafactory =

An AI Gigafactory is a large artificial intelligence (AI) data centre planned under a European Union (EU) initiative to build up to seven such facilities across member states. The programme, part of InvestAI, provides for up to €10 billion in EU and national funding intended to attract at least €20 billion in private investment; procurement is led by the European High-Performance Computing Joint Undertaking (EuroHPC JU) with eighteen member states. Tenders for the larger facilities close on 3 December 2026 and for the smaller ones on 4 February 2027.

The facilities are meant to give researchers, companies and public authorities access to computing power for training advanced AI models, complementing a network of nineteen smaller AI Factories funded since 2024.

== Programme ==
President Ursula von der Leyen announced InvestAI, a €200 billion investment plan, on 11 February 2025, describing the €20 billion gigafactory fund as "akin to a CERN for AI". The Council widened the joint undertaking's mandate to gigafactory-scale AI computing and quantum technology in Regulation (EU) 2026/150 of 16 January 2026.

EuroHPC JU describes gigafactories as facilities able to handle the full lifecycle of very large AI models, open to researchers and private and public users, with emphasis on start-ups, scale-ups and small and medium-sized enterprises. To qualify, a facility must integrate three to four times the most advanced processors of Europe's most powerful AI factories and demonstrate adequate power, energy and water efficiency.

The formal call, published on 30 July 2026, covers two lots: up to four medium-scale facilities with at least 75,000 advanced processors (EU funding of up to €100 million in a first phase and up to €400 million more in a second), and up to three larger facilities with at least 100,000 processors (up to €200 million plus a further €800 million). Applications are open to consortia or special purpose vehicles; a gigafactory may occupy one site or several, including across borders, but must be located in an EU country.

Public funding is to stay below 35 percent of total investment. Member states act as anchor customers: before development starts, a government must commit to buying compute from the project in its country at a level matching the EU contribution, with payments beginning only once the facility is operational. The European Investment Bank Group agreed in December 2025 to advise consortia and consider loans alongside grants.

=== National commitments ===
By September 2026, two-thirds of EU governments had pledged around €3 billion in total, according to a Commission document reported by Politico. France, Denmark, Poland and the Czech Republic committed roughly €100 million each to a medium-scale hub, and Germany, Greece, Italy, Portugal and Spain €200 million each toward a large one. Germany later added €800 million. Poland's Council of Ministers adopted resolution 153 on 14 July 2026, approving its €100 million commitment as a guarantee of compute-time purchases applying only if a Polish consortium wins the tender.

== Selection ==
An informal call for expressions of interest ran from April to June 2025, drawing 76 respondents according to the Commission's initial announcement. The Commission's programme page now cites 77 proposals across 60 sites in 16 member states, with reported investment values above €230 billion. In early November 2026 the lot 1 deadline moved to 4 February 2027 to give member states time to complete national budgetary procedures; the lot 2 deadline remained 3 December 2026. Evaluation is run by the EuroHPC JU, with award decisions expected in early 2027 and facilities operational within 18 months of contract signing.

=== Announced consortia ===
On 16 November 2026, Nokia, Nscale, Skeleton, Telia and Verda announced AI Gigafactory Northern (AIGF Northern), a consortium intending to bid for a federated, multi-site gigafactory linking Oulu in Finland, Iru in Estonia and Valmiera in Latvia, with the Swedish site undetermined. VTT Technical Research Centre of Finland and KTH Royal Institute of Technology were named as research partners. The announcement gave no capacity, investment or timetable details.

== Reception and criticism ==
MEPs and analysts questioned whether Europe has demand for the planned capacity: German Green MEP Sergey Lagodinsky said nobody could explain the business case, and a Cisco executive compared the planned spending unfavourably with American investment. Octave Klaba, chief executive of OVHcloud, said in September 2026 that the public commitments were too small, estimating operators would need sales of about €300 million a year per facility.

The selection process has drawn criticism over the unpublished identities of the 2025 respondents and financing talks held without public visibility. Reporting on the EU's first leaders-level AI summit in Dublin on 13 November 2026, Reuters attributed the plan's delay to a member-state dispute over competitiveness spending in the 2028–2034 budget.
