= Mazsalaca =

Town in Valmiera Municipality, Latvia

- Town
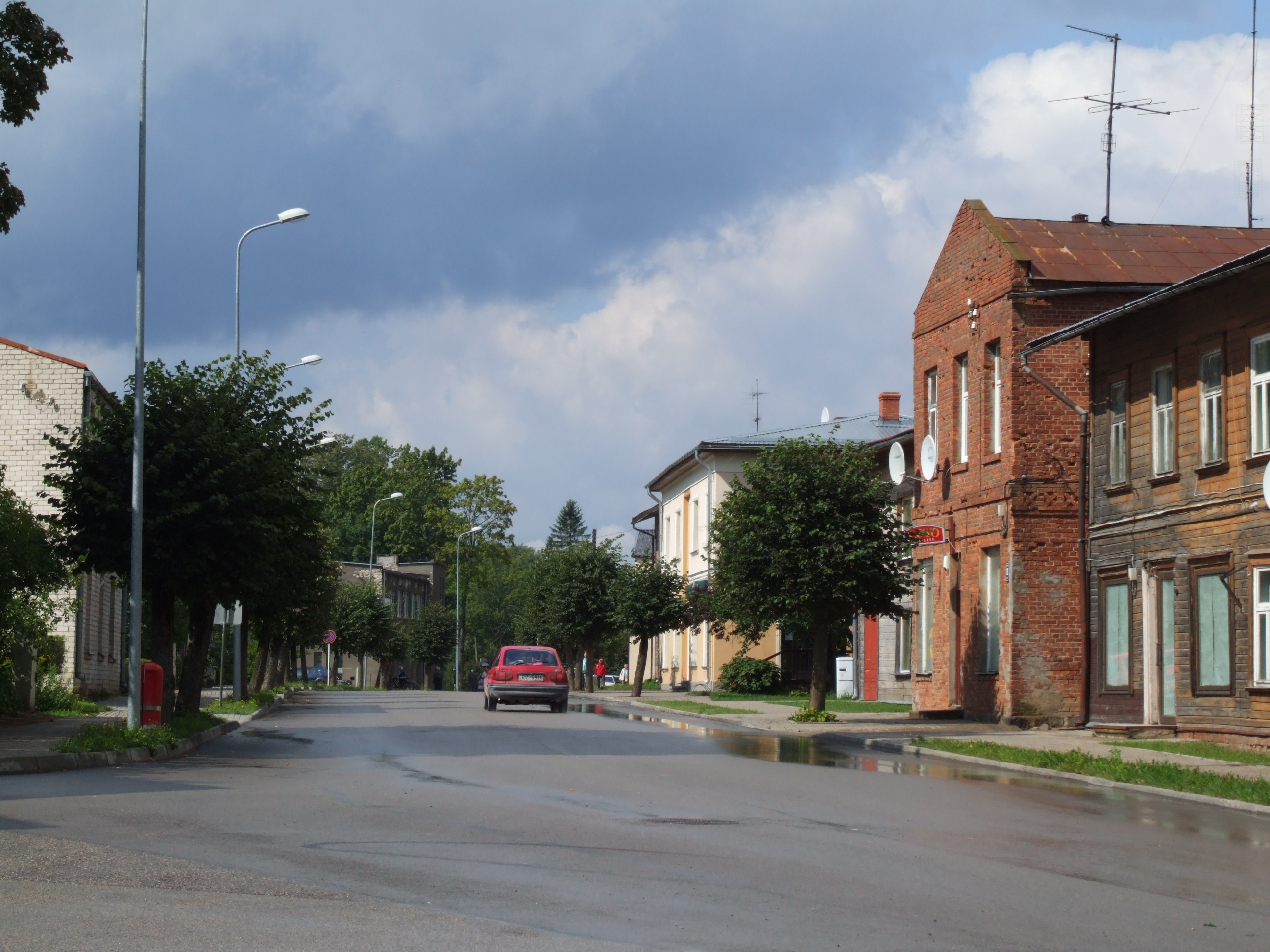
- Baznīcas Street in Mazsalaca

- Coat of arms

- Location in Latvia
- Coordinates: 57°52′N 25°03′E
- Country: Latvia
- Municipality: Valmiera Municipality
- Town rights: 1928

Area
  - Total: 2.85 km^{2} (1.10 sq mi)
  - Land: 2.77 km^{2} (1.07 sq mi)
  - Water: 0.08 km^{2} (0.031 sq mi)

Population (2026)
  - Total: 1,094
  - Density: 395/km^{2} (1,020/sq mi)
- Time zone: UTC+2 (EET)
  - Summer (DST): UTC+3 (EEST)
- Postal code: LV-4215
- Calling code: +371 642
- Number of city council members: 9
- Website: http://www.mazsalaca.lv/public/eng/

Mazsalaca (pronounced [ˈmɑsːɑlɑtsɑ]; Livonian: Piškisalāts, Estonian: Väike-Salatsi, German: Salisburg) is a town in Valmiera Municipality in the Vidzeme region of Latvia. It has 1269 inhabitants. The town is also the extraterritorial center of Mazsalaca Parish.

== History ==
The area includes the largest known Stone Age burial site in Northern Europe and was first settled ca. 5000 BC. The present town began to develop in 1864, when a bridge over the Salaca river was constructed.

During World War II, Mazsalaca was under German occupation from 4 July 1941 until 25 September 1944. It was administered as a part of the Generalbezirk Lettland of Reichskommissariat Ostland.

In October 2009 a meteorite crater was claimed to be found near the town, which later turned out to be hoax as part of marketing campaign of telecommunication company Tele2.

== People ==
People who were born, lived in Mazsalaca:

- Gustavs Ērenpreiss (1891–1956) – manufacturer of bicycles
- Augusts Kirhenšteins (1876–1963) – microbiologist and educator
- Valters Hirte (1913–1983) – craftsman
- Ansis Epners (1937–2003) – film director
- Oskars Perro (1918–2003) – soldier and writer

== See also ==
- List of cities and towns in Latvia
