= 2009 Latvian meteorite hoax =

The 2009 Latvian meteorite hoax was a publicity stunt in which Swedish-based telecommunications company Tele2 staged an apparent meteorite landing which was later revealed to be fake.

== The "Meteorite" incident ==
The drama began at around 17:30 local time (15:30 GMT) in Latvia on Sunday 25 October 2009. Student Ancis Steinbergs reported that a fiery meteor-like object had fallen in a field outside the town of Mazsalaca near the Estonian border. Reports described the object lighting up the evening sky with a blazing trail and hitting the ground with a loud crash, leaving a burning crater claimed to be around 20 m (66 ft) wide and from 3 m (9.8 ft) up to 10 m (33 ft) deep. Fire crews, police and military units attended the site, which was cordoned off while tests were carried out to check radiation levels. The crater quickly attracted scientific and media interest amid widespread speculation about the origin of the object.

Steinbergs also filmed a video in which he and his two companions (his girlfriend and another student) approach the smoking crater and talk to each other excitedly when they apparently discover a burning mass at the bottom of the crater. The deliberately amateur style of the video, with shaky handheld camerawork and apparently spontaneous reactions from the students, has been compared to The Blair Witch Project. The video was published on YouTube and news websites, attracting worldwide interest. Landowner Larisa Gerasimova reportedly charged visitors the equivalent of $2 each to view the crater.

== Investigation ==
The first scientist to visit the site, Uldis Nulle of the Latvian Environment, Geology and Meteorology Centre, said his initial impression was that a meteor impact could have caused the crater. However, when he later examined the site in daylight he concluded it had been faked. Other scientists who inspected the crater confirmed that it was a hoax. Andris Karpovics, a doctoral student of geology at the University of Latvia, described the crater as "a simple, man-made hole with a substance poured in". He told journalists that the hole appeared to have been dug with shovels, and noted that thermite (a mixture of aluminium and iron, possibly with sulfur added), probably caused the increased temperatures observed in the crater. The crater was considerably smaller than initially reported: its actual diameter was around 9–10 m (30–33 ft) and it was about 2–3 m (6.6–9.8 ft) deep. Dr Ilgonis Vilks, chairman of the scientific council at the University of Latvia's Institute of Astronomy, declared "it’s a fake. It’s very disappointing, I was full of hope coming here, but I am certain it is not a meteorite". Dr Vilks pointed out that there was green grass inside the artificial crater, with only a small area at the bottom burnt, and no ejected material or meteorite fragments were found on surrounding land. He described the supposed meteorite as "a ball of clay that was burning", and said that samples had been taken for university geologists to examine. He noted "There was a small blast heard by local people but this was not strong enough to create the crater". Nature conservationist Dainis Ozols also examined the scene and said he believed that someone had burned a pyrotechnic compound at the bottom of a man-made hole to create the illusion of a meteorite crater. Police warned of a possible criminal investigation into the hoax.

Caroline Smith, meteorite curator at the Natural History Museum in London, stated that the pictures and video footage of the burning crater indicated that it was not a meteorite crater: meteorites are not aflame when they strike Earth. Smith also pointed out that there were no other reported sightings of any fireball in the sky, which would have been very clearly visible had the "meteorite" been real. It is believed that a meteorite would have to be around a metre or more in diameter to result in a crater of that size. Sizeable meteorites are rare, since most objects which enter the Earth's atmosphere burn up before reaching the planet's surface. The most recent large meteorite known to have landed on Earth struck near Carancas in Peru in 2007, leaving a crater around 15 m (49 ft) wide.

== Tele2's admission and aftermath ==
On Tuesday 27 October 2009, Swedish-based telecommunications company Tele2 admitted to perpetrating the hoax as a publicity stunt, and promised to reimburse the Latvian government for expenses incurred in responding to the incident. Spokesperson Vita Sirica representing the Latvian branch of Tele2 said the stunt, which was organised in collaboration with media agency Inspired, was intended "to draw attention away from Latvia's economic crisis and toward something else more interesting." She explained that 9 people had dug the hole and burned chemicals at the bottom to create the elaborate hoax. The meteorite hoax occurred the day before the recession-hit Latvian government approved an austerity budget for 2010, and some officials were not impressed by the stunt. Interior Minister Linda Murniece accused Tele2 of a "cynical mockery", and announced that the Government would cancel its contract with Tele2, stating "The Interior Ministry doesn't want to do business with a firm that promotes itself at our expense".

Pernilla Oldmark, spokesperson for Tele2 in Stockholm, said the hoax had been carried out by the Latvian branch of Tele2 though authorised by its head office. She apologised for disruption and said the stunt had been intended to launch a forthcoming marketing campaign, claiming "The message will become clear as soon as the concept is launched". Latvian Advertising Association President Girts Ozols said that the situation was unprecedented but the hoax could be considered an ethics violation in professional advertising. Ozols expressed concern that the incident had caused the community to feel insecure, and commented "If such a prank is pulled, the culprits should not have allowed it to drag on for so long without revealing the truth." The Latvian Advertising Association's board is to review the matter.
