= Aleksandrs Klinklāvs =

Latvian architect

- Born: February 7, 1899; Sēja parish (now Saulkrasti Municipality), Kreis Riga, Governorate of Livonia, Russian Empire (now Latvia)
- Died: October 6, 1982 (aged 83); Chicago, USA
- Occupation: Architect
- Buildings: Ministry of Finance, Riga; Sanatorium of Tērvete, Tērvete; G. Ērenpreis Bicycle Factory, Riga

Aleksandrs Klinklāvs (February 7, 1899 – October 6, 1982) was a Latvian architect, noted for his works in the functionalist style.

== Education ==
Aleksandrs Klinklāvs was born in Sēja Parish (formerly also Sēja Municipality, modern day Saulkrasti Municipality) in 1899. In 1930, he graduated from the Faculty of Architecture of the University of Latvia.

== Career ==
In the early 1930s he started to work in the building department of the Latvian Red Cross and established his own architecture firm. From 1936 to 1940 he worked in Latvian Chamber of Crafts. During World War II he fled to Germany to escape the Soviet re-occupation of Latvia and in 1948 he moved to Canada. He worked in the architect bureau Barott, Marshall & Meritt, where he was the main designer, and in 1959 he became the main designer in the Chicago-based architect bureau Jensen, Halstead & Rummel.

Klinklāvs participated in the establishment of the Montreal Latvian Theater. In his list of projects there are various hospitals and public buildings. In Latvia he designed the building of Ministry of Finance of Latvia, Tērvete Sanatorium, buildings of the G. Ērenpreis Bicycle factory and the V. Ķuze Confectionery company (now – the Staburadze building) in Riga.

== Selected list of buildings by A. Klinklāvs ==
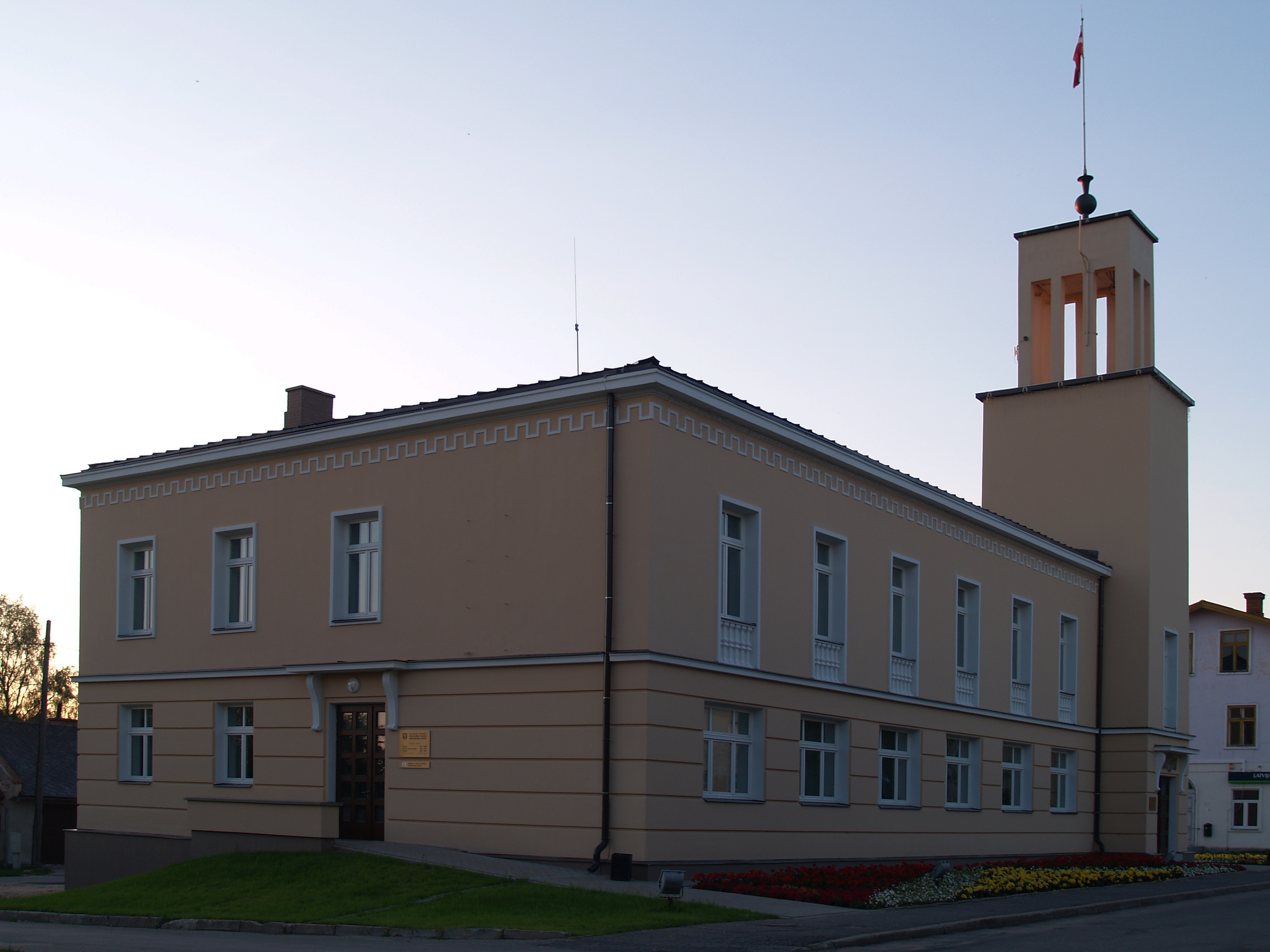
Rūjiena Town Hall built in 1935

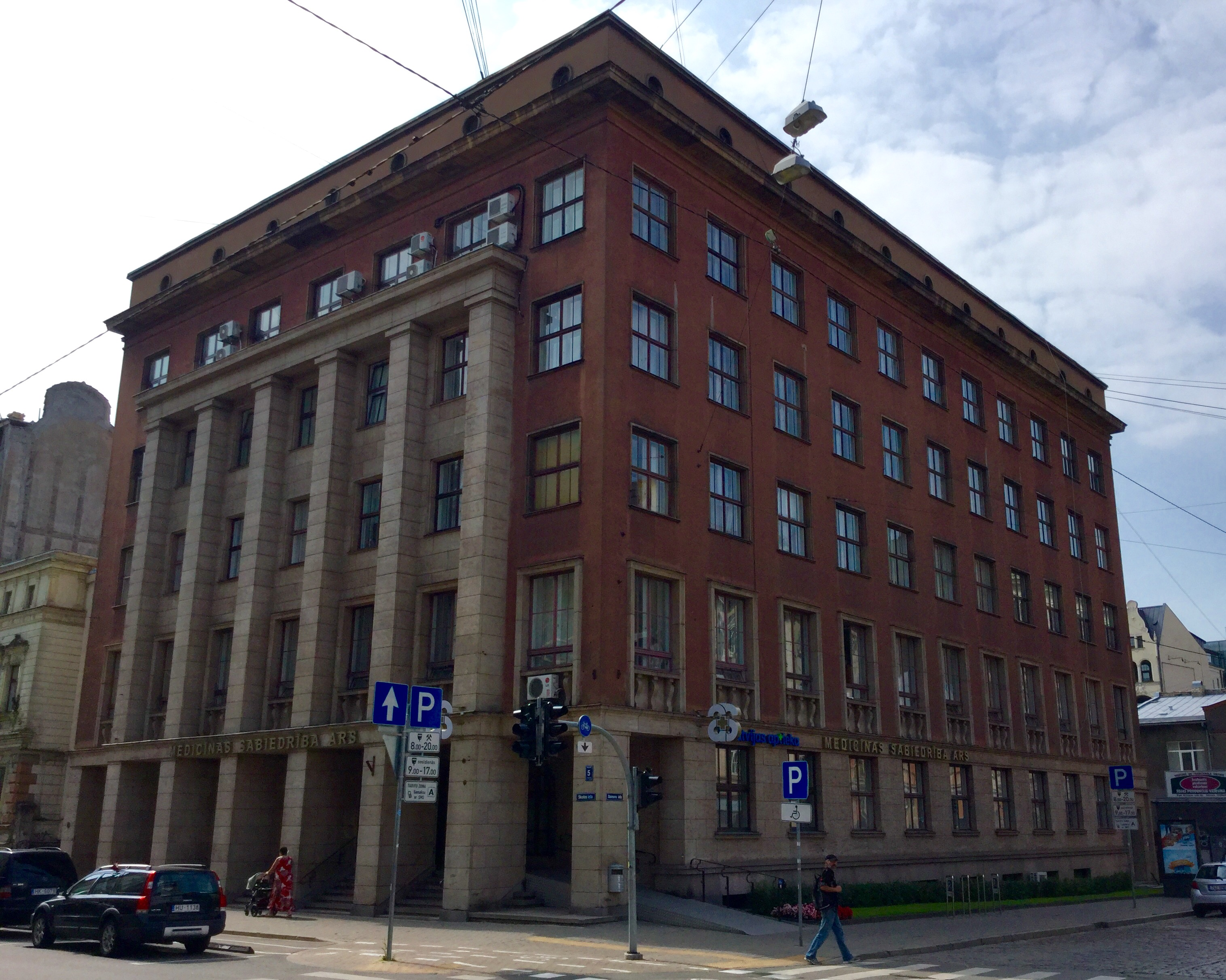
Office building at Skolas iela 5, Riga built in 1937.

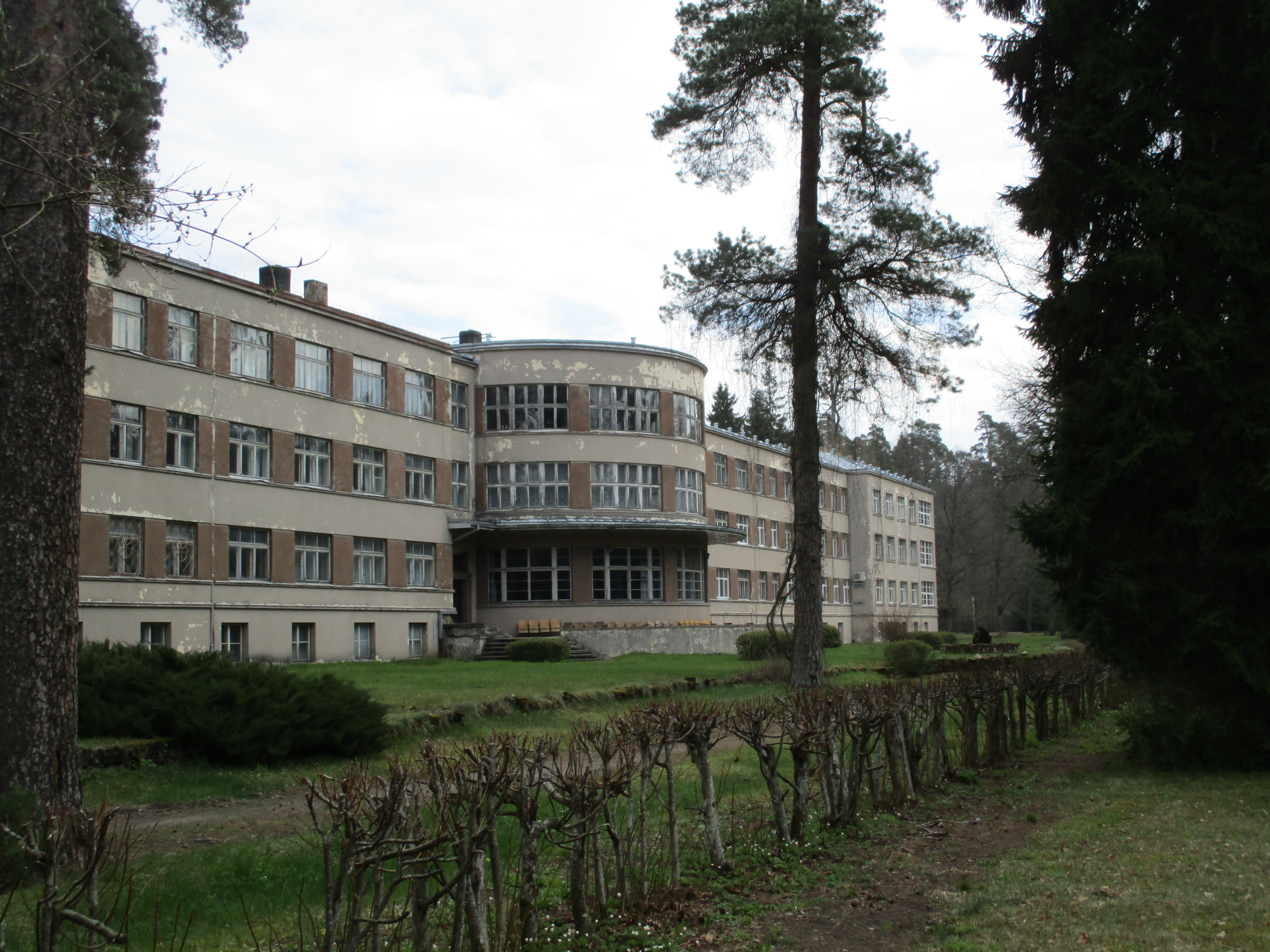
Building of Tērvete Sanatorium in Tērvete, built in 1932 (together with A. Kalniņš).

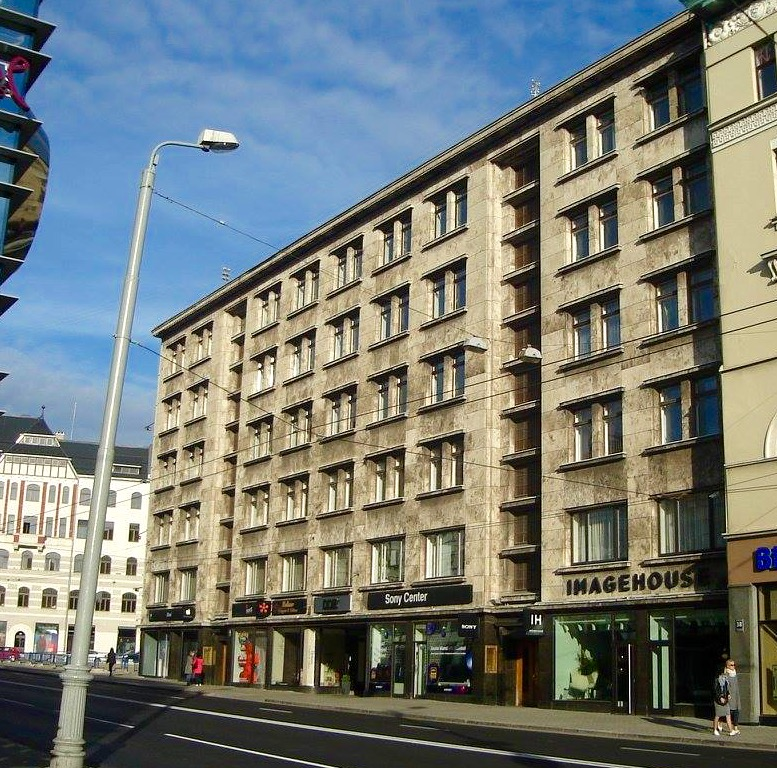
Residential building at Brīvības iela 40, Riga built in 1938.

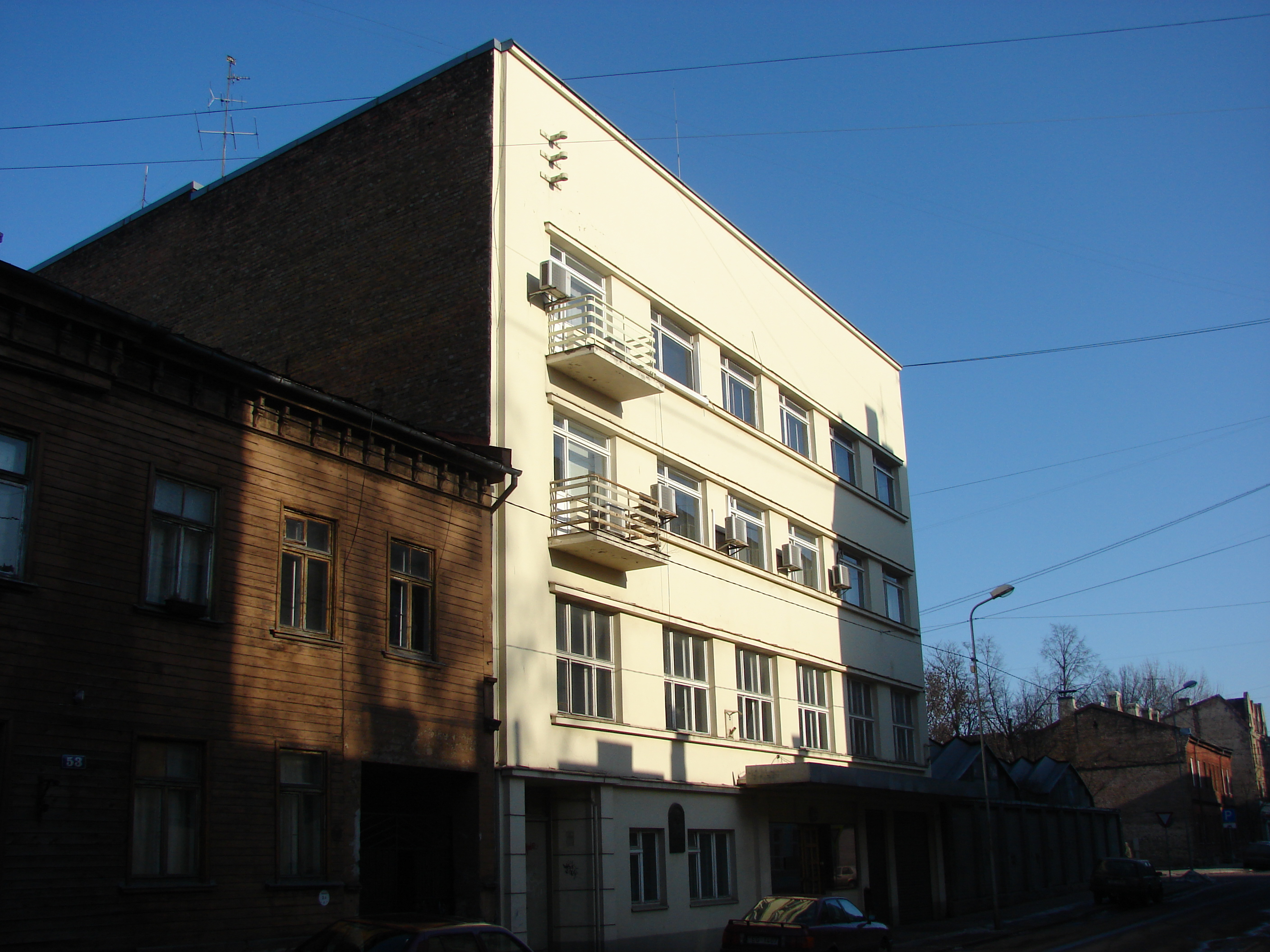
The V. Ķuze factory building in Artilērijas iela 55, Riga, built 1934
