= Oskars Perro =

Latvian military personnel and writer

- Born: September 26, 1918; Mazsalaca, Russian Empire
- Died: May 2, 2003 (aged 84); Canada
- Military career
- Allegiance: Nazi Germany
- Service years: 1941–1945
- Rank: Obersturmführer
- Unit: Latvian Legion
- Awards: Iron Cross 2nd & 1st class

Oskars Perro (September 26, 1918 – May 2, 2003) was a Latvian soldier and writer. He was the first Latvian to be awarded the German Iron Cross in the Second World War.

== Biography ==
Oskars Perro was born in Mazsalaca, Latvia on 26 September 1918. He studied medicine at Latvian University.

In 1941 his family suffered in the Soviet mass deportations. When Soviet-German War broke out in June 1941, Perro volunteered in the German army.

In December 1941, first Latvian units was sent to the Eastern Front. In January 1942, Perro with a small group of Latvian soldiers was trapped near Demyansk pocket, at Kholm. He was wounded twice, but managed to survive until the pocket was liberated in May 1942. For his valour in these battles he was awarded with Iron Cross 2nd Class, thus becoming first Latvian in the Second World War to receive it. After that he was treated in military hospitals in Kaunas and Munich.

After treatment he returned to Riga and was assigned as lecturer in training of NCOs. In spring 1943 he was put in a military hospital in Riga for further treatment. When the Latvian Legion was established, he was assigned to its staff and became the Legion's communications officer on Latvian radio. In April 1944 Perro returned to the Eastern Front. By the order of general inspector of Latvian Legion Rūdolfs Bangerskis, he was assigned as communications officer to German VI SS Corps. Both Latvian waffen SS divisions in that time was in Velikaya river positions and was part of VI SS corps. Commander of VI army corps Karl Pfeffer-Wildenbruch appointed Perro as his personal aide. After heavy battles in summer 1944 when Latvian Legion retreated to Latvia, Perro was commanded to 19th Waffen SS (2nd Latvian) division. There he was assigned as staff officer and later served in 19th Fusilier battalion under command of Waffen-Sturmbannführer Ernests Laumanis.

In the Courland pocket he was personal aide of Bruno Streckenbach, commander of 19th Waffen SS division. In spring 1945 he commanded company in Waffen-Grenadier Regiment der SS 43 in the same division. In Courland pocket he was awarded with the Iron Cross 1st Class.

On 27 April he was wounded for a fifth time and on 8 May, evacuated to Germany on the last ship from Ventspils. On 12 May, the ship reached Kiel and Perro entered Allied captivity. He finished the war with the rank of Waffen-Obersturmführer.

== Life after war ==
After treatment and captivity he returned to his studies; first in Germany, but from 1948 in Canada. He was active member of Latvian exile organizations and of Latvian student fraternity Fraternitas Cursica. He published five autobiographical books about the war. In 1997 Mike Wallace of 60 Minutes attempted to interview him about his role in the war.

Oskars Perro died 2 May 2003 in Canada.

== Bibliography ==
In Latvian:

- Holmas cietoksnis (1982)
- Vēstures veidotāji (1985)
- Neuzvarēto traģēdija (1987)
- Karavīksnes lokā (1988)
- Dvēseļu cietokšņi (1997)

In English:

- Fortress Cholm (1992)
