= Ērenpreiss Bicycles =

Company based in Riga, Latvia

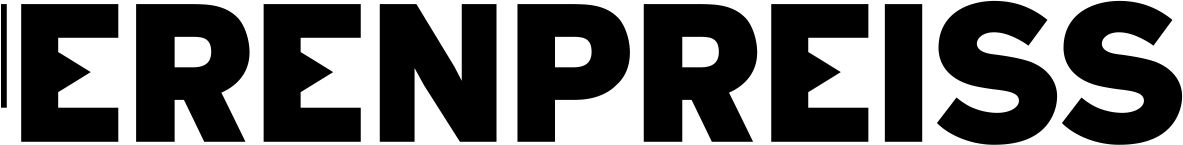

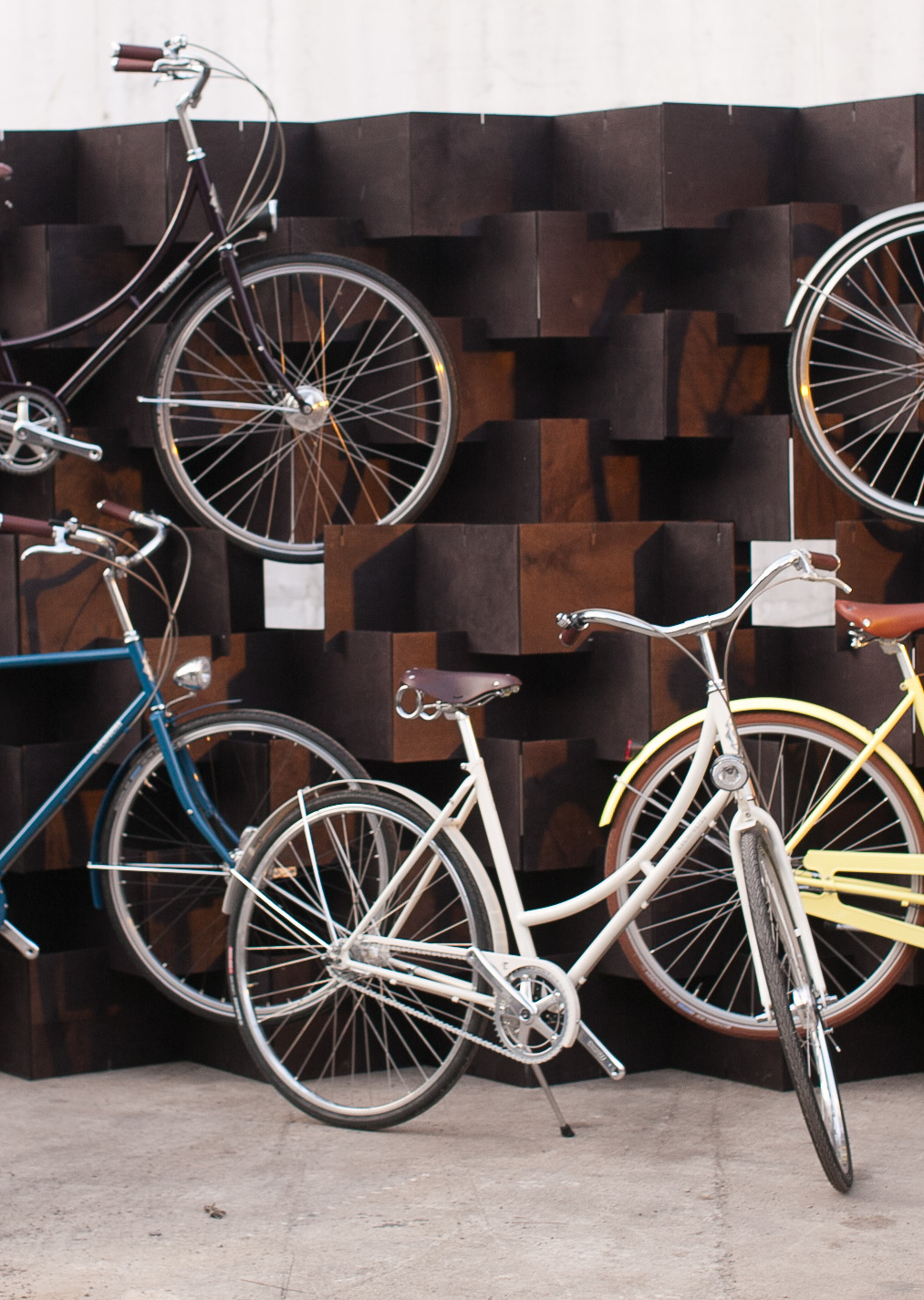
- Ērenpreiss bicycle model Paula
- Industry: Manufacturing
- Founded: 2010; 16 years ago
- Headquarters: Riga, Latvia
- Key people: Toms Ērenpreiss
- Products: City bicycle
- Revenue: 60% of product is exported to around 15 countries
- Number of employees: 12
- Website: erenpreiss.com

Ērenpreiss Bicycles is a manufacturer of city bicycles based in Riga, Latvia.

Ērenpreiss Bicycles as a company was founded (and is run) by Toms Ērenpreiss, Gustavs Ērenpreis' great-grandnephew. Gustavs Ērenpreiss bicycle factory was a manufacturer of bicycles and bicycle parts in Riga, Latvia, and in the 1930s became the largest and most important bicycle factory in the Baltic states.

== Design ==
All Ērenpreiss bicycles combine a classical look with a contemporary approach – the frames are made of steel, upright or semi-upright riding position, wheels are 622 mm (700 C) rim size. As of 2015, the combinations allow single-, two-, three-, or five-speed gearing options.

=== Models ===
All Ērenpreiss bicycle models have a name that describes the type of the bicycle.

The flagship bicycles Paula and Gustav have gearing, color and frame size options, Tom and Greta bicycles share the same matte-black color, two-speed gearing and are available in different frame sizes. Paula and Greta have a women's frame, Gustav and Tom have a men's frame.

The bicycle name Gustav comes from Gustavs Ērenpreiss, the founder of the historical Gustavs Ērenpreiss Bicycles factory, Greta is derived from Gustavs Ērenpreiss’ favorite actress Greta Garbo, while Tom is named after Toms Ērenpreiss, the founder of the new Ērenpreiss Bicycles.

In 2014, new models were launched – Sparrow and Finch.

Sparrow bicycles have a semi-upright riding position, come in silver grey and with male or female frames in two sizes. Gearing is either single or two-speed “kick-shift”.

Finch is a ladies' bicycles with an upright riding position. It comes in two colors, three-speed gearing, and one frame size.

The names Sparrow and Finch are derived come from the bicycle's resemblance to birds, indicating that riding a bicycle is similar to flying like a bird.

== Company ==
The company was founded in 2010 by Toms Ērenpreiss. Toms and some of his friends had already opened a restoration workshop for historical bicycle in 2006. Over 100 historical bicycles were restored, renovated and repaired, including bicycle brands made in Latvia (G. Ērenpreis bicycles, Latvello, Omega), as well as bicycles of well-known foreign brands such as Triumph, Brennabor, Crescent and others, for example Soviet bicycles from the 1960s.

In these years of restoring bicycles, the idea of establishing a new Ērenpreiss bicycle company came up, and in 2012 Toms Ērenpreiss and his team launched their first bicycle collection, applying the knowledge and skills gathered in long years of restoration work.

In the same year, Ērenpreiss Original, as the company was now called, won in the category "Young Entrepreneur of the Year" of the Swedish Business Awards.

In 2013, Ērenpreiss Original launched its second bicycle collection.

In 2014, the company won the Investment and Development Agency of Latvia Export and Innovation Award in the category "Industrial Design".

Today, the Ērenpreiss team consists of 12 young professionals.

In the Latvian capital of Riga, the Ērenpreiss company is promoting the development of safety measures for bike traffic and also organizes events such as Riga's Tweed Run, which draws crowds of cyclists dressed in vintage outfits (Tweed Run tradition launched in London in 2009).
