= Andrejs Apsītis =

Latvian cyclist

Personal information
- Born: 7 February 1888 Governorate of Livonia, Russian Empire
- Died: 2 September 1945 (aged 57) Riga, Latvian SSR, Soviet Union

Cycling career
- Sport: Cycling

Andrejs Apsītis (7 February 1888 – 2 September 1945) was a Latvian cyclist. He competed for the Russian Empire at the 1912 Summer Olympics and for Latvia at the 1924 Summer Olympics.

At the 1912 Olympic games in Stockholm, he finished the 320 kilometers race for road bicycle racing, earning 60th place with a time of 12.18:20,6. At the 1924 Olympic games in Paris, Apsitis with other Latvian cyclists team shared 7th to 10th place in the 4000 meters sprint.

He participated at the World championship, where he withdrew from the race. He won multiple times in the Latvian championship and in all-Union (USSR) sport games.

Apsītis participated in competitions with G. Ērenpreis Bicycle Factory manufactured sports bicycles.
