= Alexander Leutner & Co. =

Riga-based manufacturer of the first bicycles and other vehicles of the Russian Empire

Alexander Leutner & Co. (full name in Russian: Велосипедная фабрика "Россия" Александра Лейтнера и Ко., Bicycle Factory "Rossiya" Alexander Leutner & Co.) was the first manufacturer of bicycles and motorcycles, and a pioneer of automobiles, in the Russian Empire. The company was based in Riga.

== Company history ==
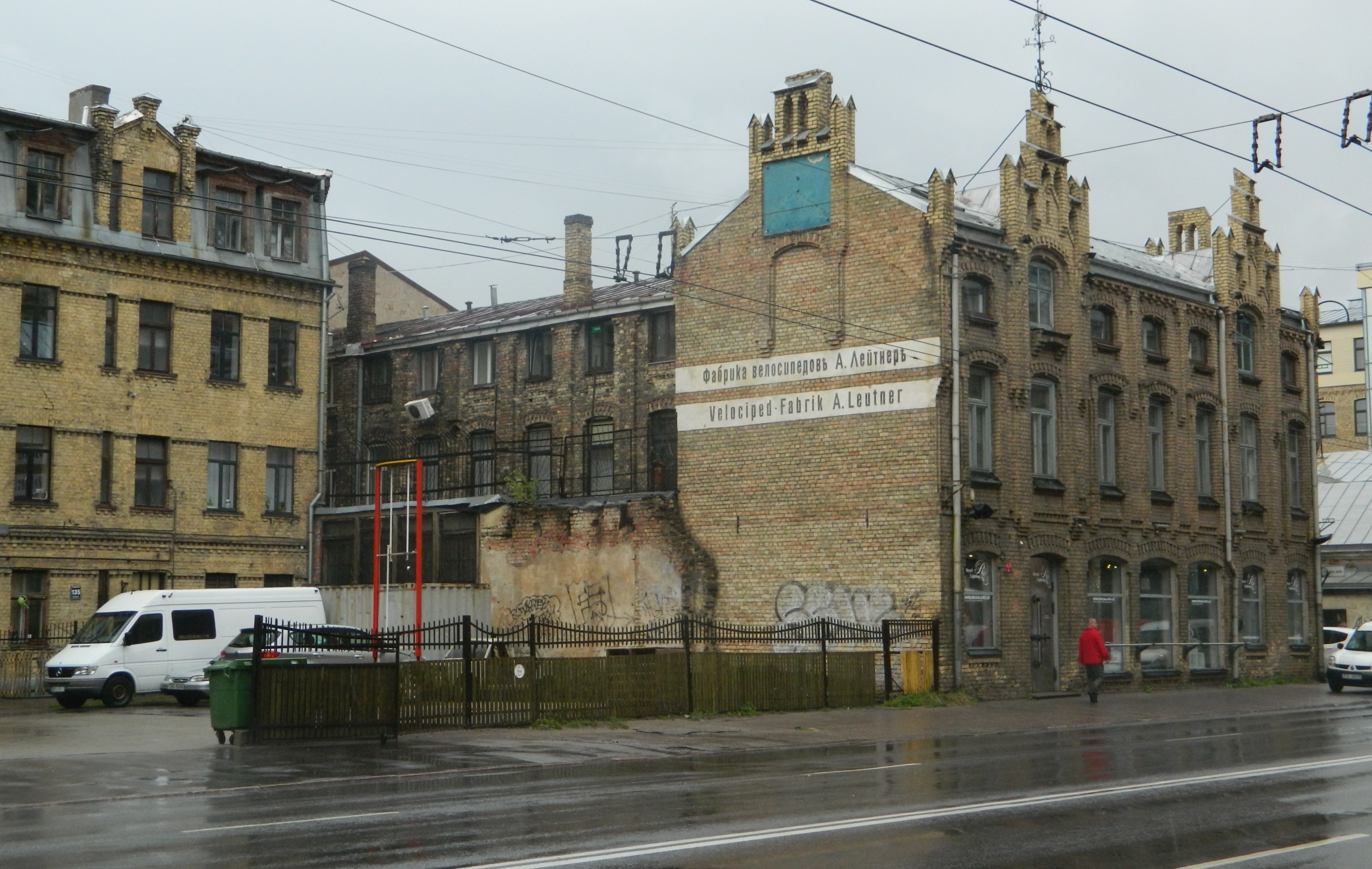
Former A. Leutner Bicycle factory. Riga, Latvia.

The company was founded in 1886 by the Baltic German entrepreneur, Alexander Leutner (1864–1923). In 1896 or 1897 it became the limited liability company Alexander Leutner & Co., with stocks being held by Leutner, two Riga German merchants, and three professors from the Riga Polytechnicum.

In time, A. Leutner & Co. grew to be not only the largest bicycle manufacturer in Riga, but also in all of the Russian Empire. In 1907 its annual production was 5,000 bicycles.

The company had 130 employees, who were subjected to Taylorist management methods in order to increase productivity.

In 1915, during World War I, the Leutner factory was evacuated to Kharkiv in Ukraine, to protect it from falling into the hands of the invading Imperial German Army. In Kharkiv the bicycle manufacturing plant was set up in one of the workshops in M. Gelferihe-Zade's agricultural factory. Production was led by Rigan Alexander Feldmanis. Leutner's factory was located in Kharkiv from 1916 to the end of November, 1917 and manufactured 3600 DUX Bojevoj foldable army bicycles. After the revolution in Russia the Kharkiv Bicycle Plant (HVZ) was founded on the premises of Leutner's factory. For a long time Kharkiv's bicycles were simply called "leutners" by the locals. In 1923 A. Leutner and his family returned to Riga but did not set up the business again. Alexander Leutner died in 1923 in Merano.

In 1924 in the premises of the Leutner's factory the Gustavs Ērenpreis Bicycle Factory moved in.

The only legacy that remains of Leutner's factory in Riga is a group of buildings between Brivibas and Cesu Streets, the old factory name written on the wall of one of the buildings and a blackened weather vane with the silhouette of a bicycle on the roof of the former administration building.

== Production ==
A. Leutner & Co. produced bicycles under the brand name "Rossiya" (Russian), and "Rossiya/Fafnir" motorised bicycles and motorcycles.

By 1907, the company was producing a range of automobiles, and its first truck rolled off the assembly line in 1912.

The company also manufactured firearms.

== See also ==
- Russo-Balt
