= Arvīds Immermanis =

Latvian cyclist

Personal information
- Born: 9 September 1912 Riga, Russian Empire (Now Latvia)
- Died: July 1947 (aged 34) Siberia, Russia

Cycling career
- Sport: Cycling

Arvīds Immermanis (9 September 1912 – July 1947) was a Latvian cyclist. He competed in the individual and team road race events at the 1936 Summer Olympics.

He competed and finished in first place in four Latvian Cycling championships; 1934 sprint race, 1935 and 1937 team road race and track cycling. Immermanis won three first places in the Latvian National Cycling competition, Vienības brauciens (Unity Ride in Latvia), from 1936 until 1938. Immermanis worked at the G. Ērenpreis Bicycle Factory.

He died in a Soviet prison camp in 1947.
