= National Student Academy =

Coordinates: 54°54′16″N 23°57′33″E

The National Student Academy (Nacionalinė moksleivių akademija, or NMA) is a not-for-profit public educational organisation for gifted high school students in Lithuania, created in 2004. Its aims are to foster the students' subject-specific interests, encourage their personal development, and to even out the regional differences in the school curriculum. This is achieved through both continuous distance learning and residential events, which take place three times a year and include both subject-specific lectures and cross-disciplinary personal development sessions. There are nine subject sections: biochemistry, chemistry, computer science, economics, history, Lithuanian philology, mathematics, music, and physics and astronomy. Around 250 students are currently members of the Academy.

== People ==
=== Administration ===
The Academy is run by a group of dedicated volunteers who take care of matters such as finance, organisation of the educational and personal development programme, information technology, international collaboration and sponsorship. The head of the Academy is the director, currently Leonas Narkevičius.

=== Subject leaders, curators and teachers ===
NMA comprises nine subject divisions: biochemistry, chemistry, economics, physics and astronomy, Lithuanian philology, computer science, history, mathematics and music. Each is overseen by a subject leader who, together with curators, is responsible for provision of the distance-learning material and the selection of lecturers for the residential events.

=== Students ===
The Academy accepts students from grades 9-10, but particular subjects (maths, Lithuanian) may accept younger students (grades 7-8). They will stay with the Academy until the end of grade 12 as long as their marks are satisfactory.

== Study programme ==
=== Distance learning ===
The students take part in a web-based continuous study programme where they regularly receive tasks graded by levels of difficulty. On average, a student receives a new assessment throughout the academic year. The results of the distance-learning programme are one of the criteria for selection to attend the residential events.

=== Residential sessions ===
The most diligent students are invited to participate in the residential sessions, of which there are three per year: in spring (in Vilnius or Kaunas), summer (in Nida) and winter (in Palanga). They consist of a range of events: subject lectures by invited specialists, personal development sessions involving art, dance, singing and sports, meetings with prominent academics, artists and public figures, intellectual games, film nights and so on. The aim is not only to provide extra academic tuition, but to promote self-expression and interpersonal communication.

At least twice a year the NMA students and teachers arrange cultural events that are open to the public. In the summer, the philology students organise literary reading sessions. The closing evening of both winter and summer sessions usually features a concert by the music students for other participants, guests of the Academy and the local public.
