= Skeleton Technologies =

Battery manufacturer and energy storage developer

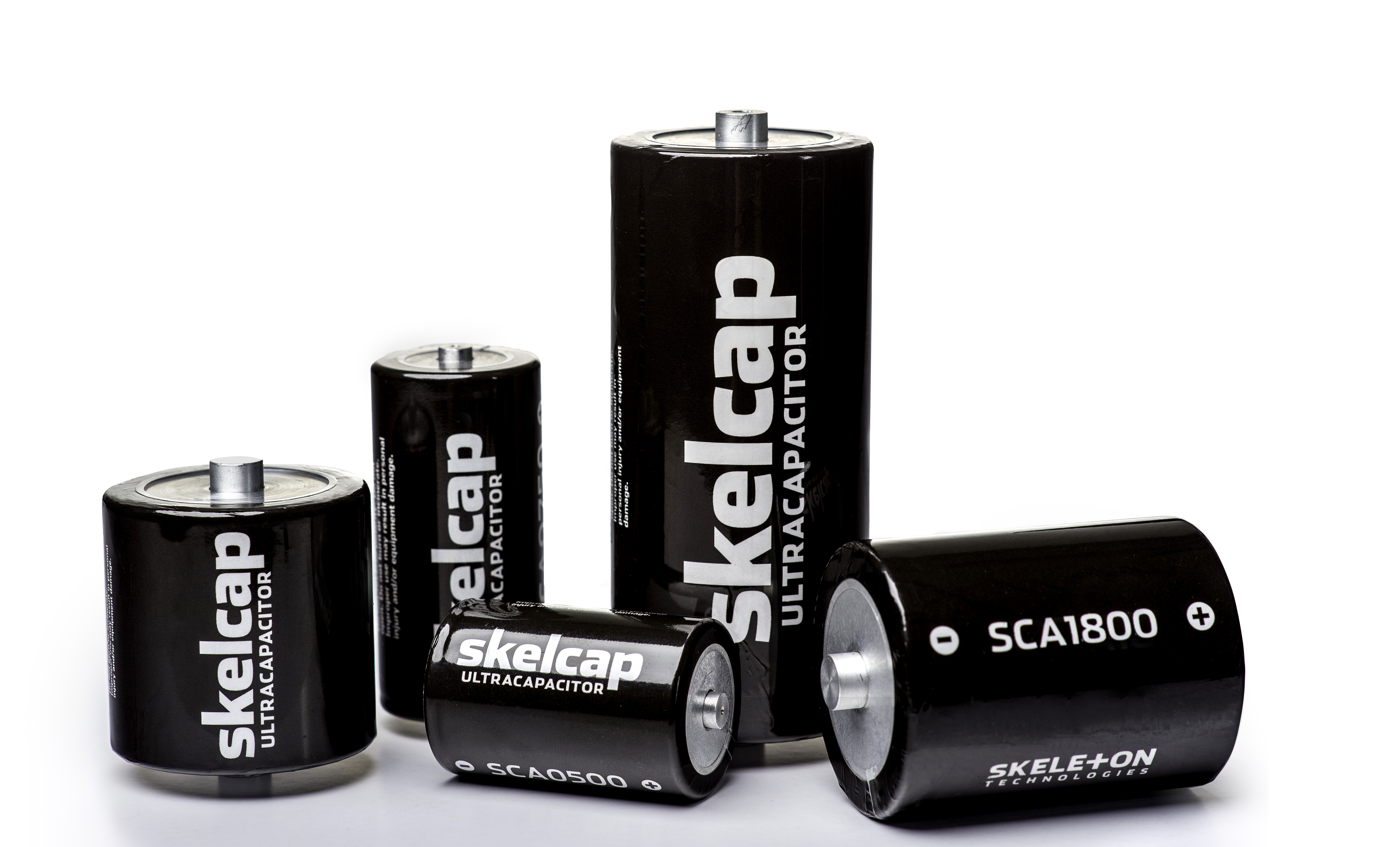
Ultracapacitators produced by Skeleton Technologies

Skeleton Technologies is an Estonian energy storage developer and manufacturer for transportation and grid applications. It was founded in 2009 to develop graphene-based supercapacitors and operates in Germany and Estonia with headquarters in Tallinn.

== History ==
Skeleton was established in 2009 by Oliver Ahlberg, Taavi Madiberk, Dr. Jaan Leis, and Dr. Anti Perkson. The company operates in Germany and Estonia, with headquarters, IT and module development in Tallinn in Bitterfeld-Wolfen, as well as a supercapacitor factory in Großröhrsdorf.

Skeleton is a supplier to a number of global OEMs in automotive, transportation, grid, and further industrial applications such as Siemens, Škoda, and Hitachi. They are also a member of the European Battery Alliance, an industry group with over 750 members focused on developing a European battery value chain. The company has received media attention in outlets such as Bloomberg News, The Economist, Sifted, and Financial Times for their German production, battery expertise, and development of novel technologies.

=== Initial production (2009–2012) ===
Skeleton Technologies was created in 2009 for the purpose of developing graphene-based supercapacitors. In 2011, the company started the development of SpaceCap, a capacitor based on Skeleton's proprietary carbide-derived carbon material, as a part of a commission from the European Space Agency. In 2012, Skeleton launched its first commercial product series.

=== Expansion (2013–2022) ===
In 2013, Skeleton Technologies was incorporated in Germany as a GmbH, the German equivalent of a private limited company or limited liability company. The company held a Round A financing of €3.9 million.

In 2014, the company opened its first manufacturing facility in Viimsi, Estonia, receiving government grant money to continue the development of their ultracapacitor technologies.

Skeleton, together with Adgero SARL, introduced in 2015 a supercapacitor-based kinetic energy recovery system for trucks, designed to reduce fuel consumption.

Beginning in 2018, the company expanded its product portfolio and began receiving orders from firms in the automotive, logistics, and aerospace industries, including Skoda Transportation.

Following a Series D financing round in 2020, Skeleton raised an additional 41.3 million euros.

In 2022, Skeleton announced the investment of 220 million euros to begin building a new factory near Leipzig, in partnership with Siemens. The factory will be located in Markranstädt and is Skeleton's second manufacturing site in the state of Saxony.

=== Scale-up 2023 ===
Skeleton raised 108 million euros from Siemens, Marubeni, and CBMM to continue the scale-up of its Leipzig Superfactory for supercapacitor production. In 2023, Skeleton announced its purchase of the former European Batteries manufacturing facility in Varkaus, Finland, for pilot production and scale-up of its SuperBattery technology.

== Applications ==
Skeleton produces supercapacitors to improve fuel efficiency and support power storage and discharge in electric vehicles. In automotive applications, supercapacitors can be connected in parallel with batteries to increase both energy density and power density and improve the longevity of the energy storage system.

Skeleton offers supercapacitor-based energy storage systems for wind power applications, which help control wind power plant output and provide ancillary services to the power system. As an energy storage medium, supercapacitors can deploy electricity instantaneously to manage demand surges and power quality issues such as flickers and interruption events.

Skeleton has developed solutions for cranes and elevators as well as technologies for the marine, medical, and oil & gas sectors. For Transiidikeskus, one of the largest container terminals in the Baltic Region, the company developed a crane equipped with a graphene supercapacitor-powered kinetic energy recovery system (KERS). The company claims it can reduce the fuel consumption and CO_{2} emissions by 34%. Skeleton has also developed a KERS system for elevators that it claims is able to reduce energy consumption by 50% or more by storing and reusing energy generated during operation.

In addition to cars, Skeleton Technologies provides supercapacitor-based solutions for rail and trams, trucks, bus, and heavy equipment.

Skeleton Technologies and Class8 Energy, a Canadian equipment distributor, have signed an €11.6 million contract to supply supercapacitor modules to the North American trucking and retail industries. The modules will reduce cold-cranking time by a factor of 2 and offer higher cranking power than a battery, without toxic materials.

The company is a supplier for several tram producers in major European cities. Skeleton has a contract with Škoda Electric, a branch of the auto company which produces electric motors for rail applications, to provide supercapacitors for Mannheim's tram system. They also have a large-scale contract with Medcom, an electric traction producer, to provide supercapacitors for the Warsaw tram network. For Škoda and Medcom, the SkelMod 51V module has enabled energy savings of up to 30% with onboard kinetic energy recovery, an application where braking energy is harnessed by the supercapacitor module bank and used for acceleration.

Polish electrical switchgear manufacturer ZPUE and Skeleton Technologies have signed a letter of intent, stating that Skeleton will provide supercapacitors for rail wayside storage at 200 MW per year from 2023 to 2025. These storage systems, located inside the station rather than in the train itself, capture energy released as the train brakes and use it to power acceleration. Skeleton will also supply 160 MW of storage for grid stability applications between 2023 and 2025. The cooperation represents more than 30 million euros of commercial value. As with tram applications, Skeleton's technologies have been shown to improve train efficiency by increasing energy savings to reduce costs and CO_{2} emissions. The implementation of supercapacitor technology provides effective voltage stabilization for rail systems, improves propulsion performance for light rail vehicles, and advances locomotive engine starting technologies.

== Technology ==
Skeleton's SkelCap supercapacitor series provides up to four times higher power density as well as lower equivalent series resistance when compared to other supercapacitor cells, leading to improved application lifetime. They have a long lifetime of over 1 million charge cycles or 15+ years and near-total efficiency in temperatures ranging from −40 to 65 degrees Celsius.

== Financing ==
Skeleton Technologies has secured funding from a variety of sources including:

- €2.5 million from the European Innovation Council to double the capacity of their graphene supercapacitors as part of the SKLCARBONP2 project
- €4 million in investments from KIC InnoEnergy, an investment company dedicated to promoting sustainable innovation and entrepreneurship in Europe's energy industry
- €15 million in ‘quasi-equity’ financing from the European Investment Bank
- €13 million in new investment from FirstFloor Capital, a Malaysian venture capital investment firm specialising in funding high-growth technology companies This investment brought Skeleton's total financing to €26.7 million in Round C.
- €51 million from Germany's Federal Ministry for Economic Affairs and Climate Action (BMWi) and the Free State of Saxony to execute their development roadmap as part of the European Battery Innovation IPCEI
- €70.4 million in total Round D financing
- €108 million from Siemens, Marubeni Corporation and CBMM to scale production of their batteries and supercapacitors

In total, Skeleton Technologies have received over 300 million euros in financing. Additional investors include Harju Elekter, Up Invest, MM Grupp, CTEK, and Wise.
