= List of military occupations of Latvia =

Latvia has been occupied by military forces from other nations from time to time. Military occupations of Latvia have included:

- Livonian Crusade (13th century)
- Soviet occupation of Latvia in 1940
- Occupation of Latvia by Nazi Germany (1941–1945)
- Soviet re-occupation of Latvia in 1944
- Latvian Soviet Socialist Republic (21 July 1940 – 21 August 1991)

== See also ==
- Baltic states under Soviet rule (1944–1991)
- German occupation of the Baltic states during World War II
- Museum of the Occupation of Latvia
- Occupation of the Baltic states
- Soviet occupation of the Baltic states (1940)
- Soviet re-occupation of the Baltic states (1944)
