= World Artistic Gymnastics Championships – Men's team all-around =

The men's team competition was an inaugural event at the World Artistic Gymnastics Championships. It was not held in 1992, 1993, 1996, 2002, 2005, 2009, 2013, 2017, and 2021. In 1994, a separate team championships were held, apart from the individual events championships. This was the only year such a separation was made.

Three medals are awarded: gold for first place, silver for second place, and bronze for third place. Tie breakers have not been used in every year. In the event of a tie between two gymnasts, both names are listed, and the following position (second for a tie for first, third for a tie for second) is left empty because a medal was not awarded for that position. If three gymnastics tied for a position, the following two positions are left empty.

== Medalists ==
Bold numbers in brackets denotes record number of victories. Names with an asterisk (*) denote the team alternates who also received medals.

Year	Location	Gold	Silver	Bronze
1903	(Belgium) Antwerp	France; Allégre; Joseph Bollet; Georges Charmoille; Daube; Georges Dejagere; Jules Lecoutre; Joseph Lux; Joseph Martinez; Pierre Payssé	Belgium; Jan Calson; Eugène Dua; Charles Lannie; Paul Mangin; Auguste van Ackere; Albert van de Roye; Charles van Hulle	Luxembourg; André Bordang; Antoine Bordang; Paul Fournelle; François Hentges; Albert Kayser; Theodore Kimmes; Nicolas Kummert; Jean Lacaff; Martin Müller
1905	(France) Bordeaux	France; Georges Dejagere; Lucien Démanet; Marcel Lalu; Daniel Lavielle; Joseph Martinez; Pierre Payssé	Netherlands; F.J.W. Lambert; J.H. Reeder; J.H.A.G. Schmitt	Belgium; Jean de Hoe; Paul Mangin; Auguste van Ackere; Albert van de Roye; Leon van de Roye; Vital Verdickt
1907	(Austria-Hungary) Prague	Bohemia; Josef Čada; František Erben; Bohumil Honzátko; Karel Sal; Josef Seidl; Karel Stary	France; Joseph Castiglioni; Georges Charmoille; Joseph Lux; Jules Rolland; Louis Ségura; François Vidal	Belgium; Herman Carsau; Louis de Winter; Paul Giesenfeld; Karel Lannie; Paul Mangin; Leo Pouwels
1909	Luxembourg	France; Joseph Castiglioni; Auguste Castille; Armand Coidelle; Joseph Martinez; Louis Ségura; Marco Torrès	Bohemia; Josef Čada; František Erben; František Machovský; František Mráček; Karel Stary; Ferdinand Steiner	Italy; Pietro Borghi; Alberto Braglia; Otello Capitani; Angelo Mazzoncini; Guido Romano; Giorgio Zampori
1911	(Italy) Turin	Bohemia; Josef Čada; František Erben; Karel Pitl; Karel Stary; Ferdinand Steiner; Svatopluk Svoboda	France; Antoine Costa; Dominique Follacci; Jules Labéeu; Jules Lecoutre; M. Maucerier; Marco Torrès	Italy; Pietro Bianchi; Francesco Loi; Osvaldo Palazzi; Guido Romano; Paolo Salvi; Giorgio Zampori
1913	(France) Paris	Bohemia; Josef Čada; Václav Donda; Robert Prazák; Karel Stary; Ferdinand Steiner; Josef Sykora	France; N. Aubry; Ben Sadoun; Laurent Grech; Marquelet; Louis Ségura; Marco Torrès	Italy; Pietro Bianchi; Guido Boni; Osvaldo Palazzi; Guido Romano; Paolo Salvi; Giorgio Zampori
1915–1917	Not held due to World War I			
1922	(Kingdom of Yugoslavia) Ljubljana	Czechoslovakia; Stanislav Indruch; Miroslav Karásek; Miroslav Klinger; Josef Malý; František Pecháček; František Vaněček	Yugoslavia; Stane Derganc; Slavko Hlastan; Vladimir Simončič; Leon Štukelj; Peter Šumi; Stane Vidmar	France; Jean Gounot; Louis-Charles Marty; Robert Morin; Jacques Moser; Alexandre Pannetier; Marco Torrès
1926	(France) Lyon	Czechoslovakia; Josef Effenberger; Jan Gajdoš; Jan Karafiát; František Pecháček; Ladislav Riessner; Bedřich Šupčík; Ladislav Vácha; Václav Veselý	Yugoslavia; Stane Derganc; Mihael Oswald; Josip Primožič; Srečko Sršen; Leon Štukelj; Peter Šumi; Stane Vidmar; Oton Zupan	France; François Gangloff; Marcel Gorisse; Jean Gounot; Ernest Heeb; Alfred Krauss; Amand Solbach
1930	Luxembourg	Czechoslovakia; Josef Effenberger; Jan Gajdoš; Emanuel Löffler; Julius Rybak; Bedřich Šupčík; Ladislav Tikal; Jindřich Tintěra; Ladislav Vácha	France; Louis Castelli; Jean Chanteur; Jean Gounot; Marcel Itten; Alfred Krauss; Georges Leroux; Maurice Rousseau; Amand Solbach	Yugoslavia; Rafael Ban; Boris Gregorka; Anton Malej; Josip Primožič; Leon Štukelj; Peter Šumi; Stane Žilič; Neli Zupančič
1934	(Hungary) Budapest	Switzerland; Walter Bach; Hans Grieder; Hermann Hänggi; Eugen Mack; Georges Miez; Eduard Steinemann; Josef Walter; Melchior Wezel	Czechoslovakia; Jaroslav Baroch; Jan Gajdoš; Alois Hudec; Jaroslav Kollinger; Emanuel Löffler; Jan Sládek; Ladislav Tikal; Jindřich Tintěra	Germany; Franz Beckert; Konrad Frey; Kurt Krötzsch; Fritz Limburg; Herbert Lorenz; Heinz Sandrock; Walter Steffens; Ernst Winter
1938	(Czechoslovakia) Prague	Czechoslovakia; Jan Gajdoš; Gustav Hrubý; Alois Hudec; Emanuel Löffler; Josef Novotný; Vratislav Petráček; Jan Sládek; Jindřich Tintěra	Switzerland; Albert Bachmann; Siegbert Bader; Walter Beck; Eugen Mack; Hans Nägelin; Michael Reusch; Guglielmo Schmid; Leo Schürmann	Yugoslavia; Stjepan Boltižar; Miroslav Forte; Boris Gregorka; Josip Kujundžić; Josip Primožič; Janez Pristov; Miloš Skrbinšek; Josip Vadnav
1942	Not held due to World War II			
1950	(Switzerland) Basel	Switzerland; Marcel Adatte; Hans Eugster; Ernst Gebendinger; Jack Günthard; Walter Lehmann; Josef Stalder; Melchior Thalmann; Jean Tschabold	Finland; Paavo Aaltonen; Veikko Huhtanen; Kalevi Laitinen; Kaino Lempinen; Olavi Rove; Heikki Savolainen; Esa Seeste; Kalevi Viskari	France; Alphonse Anger; Raymond Badin; Marcel de Wolf; Raymond Dot; Lucien Masset; Michel Mathiot; Roger Pruvost; André Weingand
1954	(Italy) Rome	Soviet Union; Albert Azaryan; Viktor Chukarin; Sergei Dzhayani; Yevgeny Korolkov; Valentin Muratov; Hrant Shahinyan; Boris Shakhlin; Ivan Vostrikov	Japan; Akitomo Kaneko; Akira Kono; Masami Kubota; Tetsumi Nabeya; Takashi Ono; Yoshiyuki Oshima; Masao Takemoto	Switzerland; Hans Bründler; Oswald Bühler; Hans Eugster; Jack Günthard; Hans Schwarzentruber; Josef Stalder; Melchior Thalmann; Jean Tschabold
1958	(Soviet Union) Moscow	Soviet Union; Albert Azaryan; Valentin Lipatov; Valentin Muratov; Boris Shakhlin; Pavel Stolbov; Yuri Titov	Japan; Nobuyuki Aihara; Akira Kono; Takashi Ono; Masao Takemoto; Katsumi Terai; Shinsaku Tsukawaki	Czechoslovakia; Jaroslav Bím; Ferdinand Daniš; Pavel Gajdoš; Karel Klečka; Jindřich Mikulec; Josef Škvor
1962	(Czechoslovakia) Prague	Japan; Nobuyuki Aihara; Yukio Endō; Takashi Mitsukuri; Takashi Ono; Shuji Tsurumi; Haruhiro Yamashita	Soviet Union; Valery Kerdemelidi; Viktor Leontyev; Viktor Lisitsky; Boris Shakhlin; Pavel Stolbov; Yuri Titov	Czechoslovakia; Pavel Gajdoš; Karel Klečka; Přemysl Krbec; Václav Kubička; Ladislav Pazdera; Jaroslav Šťastný
1966	(West Germany) Dortmund	Japan; Yukio Endō; Takeshi Katō; Haruhiro Matsuda; Takashi Mitsukuri; Akinori Nakayama; Shuji Tsurumi	Soviet Union; Sergey Diomidov; Valery Karasyov; Valery Kerdemelidi; Boris Shakhlin; Yuri Titov; Mikhail Voronin	East Germany; Matthias Brehme; Gerhard Dietrich; Werner Dölling; Siegfried Fülle; Erwin Koppe; Peter Weber
1970	(Socialist Federal Republic of Yugoslavia) Ljubljana	Japan; Takuji Hayata; Fumio Honma; Takeshi Katō; Eizō Kenmotsu; Akinori Nakayama; Mitsuo Tsukahara	Soviet Union; Georgy Bogdanov; Sergey Diomidov; Valery Karasyov; Viktor Klimenko; Viktor Lisitsky; Mikhail Voronin	East Germany; Matthias Brehme; Gerhard Dietrich; Klaus Köste; Peter Kunze; Bernd Schiller; Wolfgang Thüne
1974	(Bulgaria) Varna	Japan; Fumio Honma; Hiroshi Kajiyama; Shigeru Kasamatsu; Sawao Katō; Eizō Kenmotsu; Mitsuo Tsukahara	Soviet Union; Nikolai Andrianov; Viktor Klimenko; Vladimir Marchenko; Edvard Mikaelian; Vladimir Safronov; Paata Shamugiya	East Germany; Olaf Grosse; Rainer Hanschke; Bernd Jäger; Wolfgang Klotz; Lutz Mack; Wolfgang Thüne
1978	(France) Strasbourg	Japan; Hiroshi Kajiyama; Shigeru Kasamatsu; Eizō Kenmotsu; Junichi Shimizu; Shinzo Shiraishi; Mitsuo Tsukahara	Soviet Union; Nikolai Andrianov; Eduard Azaryan; Alexander Dityatin; Gennady Krysin; Vladimir Markelov; Aleksandr Tkachyov	East Germany; Ralph Bärthel; Roland Brückner; Ralf-Peter Hemmann; Lutz Mack; Michael Nikolay; Reinhard Rückriem
1979	(United States) Fort Worth	Soviet Union; Artur Akopyan; Nikolai Andrianov; Alexander Dityatin; Bohdan Makuts; Vladimir Markelov; Aleksandr Tkachyov	Japan; Kōji Gushiken; Nobuyuki Kajitani; Hiroshi Kajiyama; Shigeru Kasamatsu; Eizō Kenmotsu; Toshiomi Nishikii	United States; Bart Conner; Larry Gerard; Jim Hartung; Tim LaFleur; Kurt Thomas; Peter Vidmar
1981	(Soviet Union) Moscow	Soviet Union; Artur Akopyan; Alexander Dityatin; Yuri Korolyov; Bohdan Makuts; Pavel Sut; Aleksandr Tkachyov	Japan; Kiyoshi Goto; Kōji Gushiken; Nobuyuki Kajitani; Toshiro Kanai; Kōji Sotomura; Kyoji Yamawaki	China; Huang Yubin; Li Ning; Li Xiaoping; Li Yuejiu; Peng Yaping; Tong Fei
1983	(Hungary) Budapest	China; Li Ning; Li Xiaoping; Li Yuejiu; Lou Yun; Tong Fei; Xu Zhiqiang	Soviet Union; Artur Akopyan; Vladimir Artemov; Dmitry Bilozerchev; Yuri Korolyov; Bohdan Makuts; Alexander Pogorelov	Japan; Kōji Gushiken; Noritoshi Hirata; Nobuyuki Kajitani; Shinji Morisue; Kōji Sotomura; Mitsuaki Watanabe
1985	(Canada) Montreal	Soviet Union; Vladimir Artemov; Yury Balabanov; Yuri Korolyov; Valentin Mogilny; Aleksei Tikhonkikh; Aleksandr Tumilovich	China; Li Ning; Lou Yun; Tong Fei; Xu Zhiqiang; Yang Yueshan; Zou Limin	East Germany; Holger Behrendt; Jörg Hasse; Ulf Hoffmann; Sylvio Kroll; Sven Tippelt; Holger Zeig
1987	(Netherlands) Rotterdam	Soviet Union; Vladimir Artemov; Dmitry Bilozerchev; Yuri Korolyov; Valeri Liukin; Vladimir Novikov; Aleksei Tikhonkikh	China; Guo Linxiang; Li Chunyang; Li Ning; Lou Yun; Wang Chongsheng; Xu Zhiqiang	East Germany; Holger Behrendt; Maik Belle; Ulf Hoffmann; Sylvio Kroll; Mario Reichert; Sven Tippelt
1989	(West Germany) Stuttgart	Soviet Union; Vladimir Artemov; Valery Belenky; Ihor Korobchynskyi; Vitaly Marinich; Valentin Mogilny; Vladimir Novikov	East Germany; Enrico Ambros; Jörg Behrend; Sylvio Kroll; Jens Milbradt; Sven Tippelt; Andreas Wecker	China; Guo Linxiang; Li Chunyang; Li Ge; Li Jing; Ma Zheng; Wang Chongsheng
1991	(United States) Indianapolis	Soviet Union; Valery Belenky; Ihor Korobchynskyi; Valeri Liukin; Hrihoriy Misyutin; Vitaly Scherbo; Aleksey Voropayev	China; Guo Linyao; Huang Huadong; Li Chunyang; Li Ge; Li Jing; Li Xiaoshuang	Germany; Ralf Büchner; Mario Franke; Andre Hempel; Sylvio Kroll; Jan-Peter Nikiferow; Andreas Wecker
1992	(France) Paris	No team event held		
1993	(United Kingdom) Birmingham	No team event held		
1994 (Team)	(Germany) Dortmund	China; Fan Hongbin; Guo Linyao; Huang Huadong; Huang Liping; Li Dashuang; Li Jing; Li Xiaoshuang	Russia; Dimitri Karbanenko; Alexei Nemov; Yevgeny Shabayev; Dmitri Trush; Dmitri Vasilenko; Aleksey Voropayev; Yevgeny Zhukov	Ukraine; Ihor Korobchynskyi; Vitaly Marinich; Hrihoriy Misyutin; Volodymyr Shamenko; Rustam Sharipov; Andriy Stepanchenko; Yuriy Yermakov
1995	(Japan) Sabae	China; Fan Bin; Fan Hongbin; Huang Huadong; Huang Liping; Li Xiaoshuang; Shen Jian; Zhang Jinjing	Japan; Yoshiaki Hatakeda; Masayoshi Maeda; Hiromasa Masuda; Masayuki Matsunaga; Daisuke Nishikawa; Toshiharu Sato; Hikaru Tanaka	Romania; Nicolae Bejenaru; Dan Burincă; Adrian Ianculescu; Cristian Leric; Nistor Șandro; Nicu Stroia; Marius Urzică
1996	(Puerto Rico) San Juan	No team event held		
1997	(Switzerland) Lausanne	China; Huang Xu; Li Xiaopeng; Lu Yufu; Shen Jian; Xiao Junfeng; Zhang Jinjing	Belarus; Ivan Ivankov; Dmitry Kasperovich; Ivan Pavlovsky; Vitaly Rudnitsky; Aleksandr Shostak; Aleksey Sinkevich	Russia; Alexei Bondarenko; Nikolai Kryukov; Alexei Nemov; Dmitri Vasilenko; Aleksey Voropayev; Yevgeny Zhukov
1999	(China) Tianjin	China; Dong Zhen; Huang Xu; Li Xiaopeng; Lu Yufu; Xing Aowei; Yang Wei	Russia; Maxim Aleshin; Alexei Bondarenko; Rashid Kasumov; Nikolai Kryukov; Alexei Nemov; Yevgeni Podgorny	Belarus; Ivan Ivankov; Dmitry Kasperovich; Aleksandr Kruzhilov; Vitaly Rudnitsky; Aleksandr Shostak; Aleksey Sinkevich
2001	(Belgium) Ghent	Belarus; Ivan Ivankov; Dmitry Kasperovich; Aleksandr Kruzhilov; Denis Savenkov; Aleksey Sinkevich; Vitali Valinchuk	United States; Raj Bhavsar; Paul Hamm; Stephen McCain; Brett McClure; Sean Townsend; Guard Young	Ukraine; Oleksandr Beresch; Andriy Lipsky; Ruslan Mezentsev; Andriy Mykhailychenko; Serhiy Vyaltsev; Roman Zozulya
2002	(Hungary) Debrecen	No team event held		
2003	(United States) Anaheim	China; Huang Xu; Li Xiaopeng; Teng Haibin; Xiao Qin; Xing Aowei; Yang Wei	United States; Raj Bhavsar; Jason Gatson; Morgan Hamm; Paul Hamm; Brett McClure; Blaine Wilson	Japan; Takehiro Kashima; Hiroyuki Tomita; Naoya Tsukahara; Tatsuya Yamada
2005	(Australia) Melbourne	No team event held		
2006	(Denmark) Aarhus	China; Chen Yibing; Feng Jing; Liang Fuliang; Xiao Qin; Yang Wei; Zou Kai	Russia; Maksim Devyatovskiy; Dimitri Gogotov; Sergey Khorokhordin; Nikolai Kryukov; Yuri Ryazanov; Aleksandr Safoshkin	Japan; Hisashi Mizutori; Takehito Mori; Takuya Nakase; Eichi Sekiguchi; Hiroyuki Tomita; Naoya Tsukahara
2007	(Germany) Stuttgart	China; Chen Yibing; Huang Xu (4); Liang Fuliang; Xiao Qin; Yang Wei (4); Zou Kai	Japan; Yosuke Hoshi; Shun Kuwahara; Hisashi Mizutori; Takuya Nakase; Makoto Okiguchi; Hiroyuki Tomita	Germany; Thomas Andergassen; Philipp Boy; Fabian Hambüchen; Robert Juckel; Marcel Nguyen; Evgenij Spiridonov
2009	(United Kingdom) London	No team event held		
2010	(Netherlands) Rotterdam	China; Chen Yibing; Feng Zhe; Lü Bo; Teng Haibin; Yan Mingyong; Zhang Chenglong	Japan; Kenya Kobayashi; Tatsuki Nakashima; Kazuhito Tanaka; Kōhei Uchimura; Koji Uematsu; Koji Yamamuro	Germany; Philipp Boy; Matthias Fahrig; Fabian Hambüchen; Sebastian Krimmer; Evgenij Spiridonov; Thomas Taranu
2011	(Japan) Tokyo	China; Chen Yibing (4); Feng Zhe; Teng Haibin; Yan Mingyong; Zhang Chenglong; Zou Kai	Japan; Kenya Kobayashi; Makoto Okiguchi; Kazuhito Tanaka; Yusuke Tanaka; Kōhei Uchimura; Koji Yamamuro	United States; Jacob Dalton; Jonathan Horton; Steven Legendre; Danell Leyva; Alexander Naddour; John Orozco
2013	(Belgium) Antwerp	No team event held		
2014	(China) Nanning	China; Cheng Ran; Deng Shudi; Lin Chaopan; Liu Rongbing*; Liu Yang; You Hao; Zhang Chenglong	Japan; Kohei Kameyama; Ryōhei Katō; Shogo Nonomura; Kenzō Shirai; Kazuyuki Takeda*; Yusuke Tanaka; Kōhei Uchimura	United States; Jacob Dalton; Danell Leyva; Sam Mikulak; Alexander Naddour; John Orozco; Paul Ruggeri*; Donnell Whittenburg
2015	(United Kingdom) Glasgow	Japan; Tomomasa Hasegawa*; Naoto Hayasaka; Ryōhei Katō; Kazuma Kaya; Kenzō Shirai; Yusuke Tanaka; Kōhei Uchimura	Great Britain; Brinn Bevan; James Hall*; Daniel Purvis; Louis Smith; Kristian Thomas; Max Whitlock; Nile Wilson	China; Deng Shudi; Lin Chaopan; Liu Rongbing*; Liu Yang; Xiao Ruoteng; You Hao; Zhang Chenglong
2017	(Canada) Montreal	No team event held		
2018	(Qatar) Doha	China; Deng Shudi; Lan Xingyu*; Lin Chaopan; Sun Wei; Xiao Ruoteng; Zou Jingyuan	Russia; David Belyavskiy; Artur Dalaloyan; Nikolai Kuksenkov; Dmitriy Lankin; Nikita Nagornyy; Vladislav Polyashov*	Japan; Kazuma Kaya; Kenzō Shirai; Yusuke Tanaka; Kakeru Tanigawa*; Wataru Tanigawa; Kōhei Uchimura
2019	(Germany) Stuttgart	Russia; Denis Ablyazin; David Belyavskiy; Artur Dalaloyan; Nikita Nagornyy; Vladislav Polyashov*; Ivan Stretovich	China; Deng Shudi; Lin Chaopan; Sun Wei; Xiao Ruoteng; You Hao*; Zou Jingyuan	Japan; Daiki Hashimoto; Yuya Kamoto; Kazuma Kaya; Shogo Nonomura*; Kakeru Tanigawa; Wataru Tanigawa
2021	(Japan) Kitakyushu	No team event held		
2022	(United Kingdom) Liverpool	China (13); Su Weide*; Sun Wei; Yang Jiaxing; You Hao; Zhang Boheng; Zou Jingyuan	Japan; Ryosuke Doi; Daiki Hashimoto; Yuya Kamoto; Kazuma Kaya*; Kakeru Tanigawa; Wataru Tanigawa	Great Britain; Joe Fraser; James Hall; Jake Jarman; Giarnni Regini-Moran; Adam Tobin*; Courtney Tulloch
2023	(Belgium) Antwerp	Japan; Kenta Chiba; Daiki Hashimoto; Kazuma Kaya; Kazuki Minami; Teppei Miwa*; Kaito Sugimoto	China; Lin Chaopan; Liu Yang; Shi Cong*; Su Weide; Sun Wei; You Hao	United States; Asher Hong; Paul Juda; Yul Moldauer; Fred Richard; Colt Walker*; Khoi Young
2025	(Indonesia) Jakarta	No team event held		
2026	(Netherlands) Rotterdam	Japan; Ryosuke Doi; Daiki Hashimoto; Shohei Kawakami; Fusuke Maeda; Nao Ojima*; Shinnosuke Oka	Russia ^{[b]} Arsenii Dukhno; Mukhammadzhon Iakubov*; Daniel Marinov; Sergey Naidin; Savelii Sieedin; Ilia Zaika	China; Hong Yanming*; Lan Xingyu; Li Hongyan; Tian Hao; Yang Haonan; Zou Jingyuan

== All-time medal count ==
Last updated after the 2026 World Championships.

Rank	Nation	Gold	Silver	Bronze	Total
1	China	13	5	4	22
2	Japan	8	10	5	23
3	(Soviet Union) Soviet Union	8	6	0	14
4	Czechoslovakia	4	1	2	7
5	France	3	4	3	10
6	Bohemia ^{[a]}	3	1	0	4
7	Switzerland	2	1	1	4
8	Russia ^{[b]}	1	5	1	7
9	Belarus	1	1	1	3
10	United States	0	2	4	6
11	Yugoslavia	0	2	2	4
12	East Germany	0	1	6	7
13	Belgium	0	1	2	3
14	(United Kingdom) Great Britain	0	1	1	2
15	Finland	0	1	0	1
15	Netherlands	0	1	0	1
17	Germany	0	0	4	4
18	Italy	0	0	3	3
19	Ukraine	0	0	2	2
20	Luxembourg	0	0	1	1
20	Romania	0	0	1	1
Totals (21 entries)		43	43	43	129

Note

- ^[a] Official FIG documents credit medals earned by athletes from Bohemia as medals for Czechoslovakia.
- ^[b] At the 2026 World Artistic Gymnastics Championships in Rotterdam, the Netherlands, Russia competed under the name "World Gymnastics 2" (WG2) due to regulations by the Dutch authorities. World Gymnastics still credit medals earned by Russian athletes at these championships as medals for Russia.
