= Czechoslovakia at the World Artistic Gymnastics Championships =

- Flag of Czechoslovakia
- Also competed as: Bohemia
- ISO: TCH
- Medals: Gold 39 Silver 37 Bronze 31 Total 107

Czechoslovak men first competed at the 1907 World Championships as Bohemia. They started competing as Czechoslovakia at the 1922 World Championships. Women didn't start competing at the World Artistic Gymnastics Championships until 1934, where the Czechoslovak women's team won gold. At the start of 1993 Czechoslovakia split into two separate nations: the Czech Republic and Slovakia.

== Medalists ==
Medal	Name	Year	Event
Competing as Bohemia
Gold	Josef Čada, František Erben, Bohumil Honzátko, Karel Sal, Josef Seidl, Karel Starý	(Bohemia) 1907 Prague	Men's team
Gold	Josef Čada	(Bohemia) 1907 Prague	Men's all-around
Bronze	František Erben	(Bohemia) 1907 Prague	Men's all-around
Gold	František Erben	(Bohemia) 1907 Prague	Men's pommel horse
Bronze	Karel Sal	(Bohemia) 1907 Prague	Men's pommel horse
Silver	Josef Čada	(Bohemia) 1907 Prague	Men's parallel bars
Bronze	František Erben	(Bohemia) 1907 Prague	Men's parallel bars
Gold	František Erben	(Bohemia) 1907 Prague	Men's horizontal bar
Silver	Josef Čada, František Erben, František Machovský, František Mráček, Karel Starý, Ferdinand Steiner	1909 Luxembourg	Men's team
Silver	Josef Čada	1909 Luxembourg	Men's all-around
Bronze	František Erben	1909 Luxembourg	Men's rings
Silver	Josef Čada	1909 Luxembourg	Men's parallel bars
Silver	Josef Čada	1909 Luxembourg	Men's horizontal bar
Silver	František Erben	1909 Luxembourg	Men's horizontal bar
Gold	Josef Čada, František Erben, Karel Pitl, Karel Starý, Ferdinand Steiner, Svatopluk Svoboda	(Italy) 1911 Turin	Men's team
Gold	Ferdinand Steiner	(Italy) 1911 Turin	Men's all-around
Silver	Josef Čada	(Italy) 1911 Turin	Men's all-around
Bronze	Karel Starý	(Italy) 1911 Turin	Men's all-around
Bronze	Svatopluk Svoboda	(Italy) 1911 Turin	Men's all-around
Gold	Ferdinand Steiner	(Italy) 1911 Turin	Men's rings
Bronze	Ferdinand Steiner	(Italy) 1911 Turin	Men's parallel bars
Gold	Josef Čada	(Italy) 1911 Turin	Men's horizontal bar
Bronze	Svatopluk Svoboda	(Italy) 1911 Turin	Men's horizontal bar
Gold	Josef Čada, Václav Donda, Robert Prazák, Karel Starý, Ferdinand Steiner, Josef Sykora	(France) 1913 Paris	Men's team
Silver	Karel Starý	(France) 1913 Paris	Men's all-around
Bronze	Josef Sykora	(France) 1913 Paris	Men's all-around
Gold	Josef Čada	(France) 1913 Paris	Men's horizontal bar
Bronze	Josef Sykora	(France) 1913 Paris	Men's horizontal bar
Competing as Czechoslovakia
Gold	Stanislav Indruch, Miroslav Karásek, Miroslav Klinger, Josef Malý, František Pecháček, František Vaněček	(Socialist Federal Republic of Yugoslavia) 1922 Ljubljana	Men's team
Gold	František Pecháček	(Socialist Federal Republic of Yugoslavia) 1922 Ljubljana	Men's all-around
Gold	Miroslav Klinger	(Socialist Federal Republic of Yugoslavia) 1922 Ljubljana	Men's pommel horse
Silver	Stanislav Indruch	(Socialist Federal Republic of Yugoslavia) 1922 Ljubljana	Men's pommel horse
Gold	Joseph Maly	(Socialist Federal Republic of Yugoslavia) 1922 Ljubljana	Men's rings
Gold	Miroslav Karásek	(Socialist Federal Republic of Yugoslavia) 1922 Ljubljana	Men's rings
Silver	Miroslav Klinger	(Socialist Federal Republic of Yugoslavia) 1922 Ljubljana	Men's parallel bars
Silver	Stanislav Indruch	(Socialist Federal Republic of Yugoslavia) 1922 Ljubljana	Men's parallel bars
Gold	Miroslav Klinger	(Socialist Federal Republic of Yugoslavia) 1922 Ljubljana	Men's horizontal bar
Gold	Josef Effenberger, Jan Gajdoš, Jan Karafiát, František Pecháček, Ladislav Riessner, Bedřich Šupčík, Ladislav Vácha, Václav Veselý	(France) 1926 Lyon	Men's team
Silver	Josef Effenberger	(France) 1926 Lyon	Men's all-around
Bronze	Ladislav Vácha	(France) 1926 Lyon	Men's all-around
Gold	Jan Karafiát	(France) 1926 Lyon	Men's pommel horse
Silver	Jan Gajdoš	(France) 1926 Lyon	Men's pommel horse
Bronze	Ladislav Vácha	(France) 1926 Lyon	Men's pommel horse
Silver	Ladislav Vácha	(France) 1926 Lyon	Men's rings
Bronze	Bedřich Šupčík	(France) 1926 Lyon	Men's rings
Gold	Ladislav Vácha	(France) 1926 Lyon	Men's parallel bars
Silver	Jan Gajdoš	(France) 1926 Lyon	Men's parallel bars
Bronze	Ladislav Vácha	(France) 1926 Lyon	Men's horizontal bar
Gold	Josef Effenberger, Jan Gajdoš, Emanuel Löffler, Julius Rybak, Bedřich Šupčík, Ladislav Tikal, Jindřich Tintěra, Ladislav Vácha	1930 Luxembourg	Men's team
Silver	Jan Gajdoš	1930 Luxembourg	Men's all-around
Bronze	Emanuel Löffler	1930 Luxembourg	Men's all-around
Silver	Emanuel Löffler	1930 Luxembourg	Men's floor exercise
Bronze	Jan Gajdoš	1930 Luxembourg	Men's pommel horse
Gold	Emanuel Löffler	1930 Luxembourg	Men's rings
Silver	Bedřich Šupčík	1930 Luxembourg	Men's rings
Bronze	Jan Gajdoš	1930 Luxembourg	Men's rings
Bronze	Ladislav Vácha	1930 Luxembourg	Men's parallel bars
Silver	Jaroslav Baroch, Jan Gajdoš, Alois Hudec, Jaroslav Kollinger, Emanuel Löffler, Jan Sládek, Ladislav Tikal, Jindřich Tintěra	(Hungary) 1934 Budapest	Men's team
Gold	Maria Bajerová, Vlasta Děkanová, Vlasta Foltová, Eleonora Hajková, Vlasta Jarusková, Zdeňka Veřmiřovská	(Hungary) 1934 Budapest	Women's team
Bronze	Emanuel Löffler	(Hungary) 1934 Budapest	Men's all-around
Gold	Vlasta Děkanová	(Hungary) 1934 Budapest	Women's all-around
Bronze	Jan Sládek	(Hungary) 1934 Budapest	Men's pommel horse
Gold	Alois Hudec	(Hungary) 1934 Budapest	Men's rings
Bronze	Jaroslav Kollinger	(Hungary) 1934 Budapest	Men's rings
Gold	Jan Gajdoš, Gustav Hrubý, Alois Hudec, Emanuel Löffler, Vratislav Petráček, Jan Sládek, Jindřich Tintěra	(Czechoslovakia) 1938 Prague	Men's team
Gold	Vlasta Děkanová, Božena Dobešová, Marie Hendrychová, Anna Nezerpová, Matylda Pálfyová, Marie Skálová, Zdeňka Veřmiřovská	(Czechoslovakia) 1938 Prague	Women's team
Gold	Jan Gajdoš	(Czechoslovakia) 1938 Prague	Men's all-around
Silver	Jan Sládek	(Czechoslovakia) 1938 Prague	Men's all-around
Gold	Vlasta Děkanová	(Czechoslovakia) 1938 Prague	Women's all-around
Silver	Zdeňka Veřmiřovská	(Czechoslovakia) 1938 Prague	Women's all-around
Bronze	Matylda Pálfyová	(Czechoslovakia) 1938 Prague	Women's all-around
Gold	Jan Gajdoš	(Czechoslovakia) 1938 Prague	Men's floor exercise
Silver	Alois Hudec	(Czechoslovakia) 1938 Prague	Men's floor exercise
Silver	Vratislav Petráček	(Czechoslovakia) 1938 Prague	Men's pommel horse
Gold	Alois Hudec	(Czechoslovakia) 1938 Prague	Men's rings
Bronze	Vratislav Petráček	(Czechoslovakia) 1938 Prague	Men's rings
Silver	Alois Hudec	(Czechoslovakia) 1938 Prague	Men's parallel bars
Silver	Alois Hudec	(Czechoslovakia) 1938 Prague	Men's horizontal bar
Bronze	Eva Bosáková, Miroslava Brdičková, Alena Chadimová, Věra Drazdíková, Zdeňka Lišková, Anna Marejková, Alena Reichová, Věra Vančurová	(Italy) 1954 Rome	Women's team
Silver	Eva Bosáková	(Italy) 1954 Rome	Women's all-around
Gold	Leo Sotorník	(Italy) 1954 Rome	Men's vault
Silver	Eva Bosáková	(Italy) 1954 Rome	Women's balance beam
Silver	Eva Bosáková	(Italy) 1954 Rome	Women's floor exercise
Bronze	Jaroslav Bím, Ferdinand Daniš, Pavel Gajdoš, Karel Klečka, Jindřich Mikulec, Josef Škvor	(Soviet Union) 1958 Moscow	Men's team
Silver	Eva Bosáková, Věra Čáslavská, Anna Marejková, Matylda Matoušková, Ludmila Švédová, Adolfína Tkačíková	(Soviet Union) 1958 Moscow	Women's team
Silver	Eva Bosáková	(Soviet Union) 1958 Moscow	Women's all-around
Silver	Eva Bosáková	(Soviet Union) 1958 Moscow	Women's uneven bars
Gold	Eva Bosáková	(Soviet Union) 1958 Moscow	Women's floor exercise
Bronze	Pavel Gajdoš, Karel Klečka, Přemysl Krbec, Václav Kubíčka, Ladislav Pazdera, Jaroslav Šťastný	(Czechoslovakia) 1962 Prague	Men's team
Silver	Eva Bosáková, Věra Čáslavská, Libuse Cmiralova, Hana Růžičková, Ludmila Švédová, Adolfína Tkačíková	(Czechoslovakia) 1962 Prague	Women's team
Silver	Věra Čáslavská	(Czechoslovakia) 1962 Prague	Women's all-around
Gold	Věra Čáslavská	(Czechoslovakia) 1962 Prague	Women's vault
Silver	Eva Bosáková	(Czechoslovakia) 1962 Prague	Women's uneven bars
Gold	Přemysl Krbec	(Czechoslovakia) 1962 Prague	Men's vault
Gold	Eva Bosáková	(Czechoslovakia) 1962 Prague	Women's balance beam
Bronze	Věra Čáslavská	(Czechoslovakia) 1962 Prague	Women's floor exercise
Gold	Věra Čáslavská, Jaroslava Sedláčková, Marianna Krajčírová, Jana Kubičková, Bohumila Řimnáčová, Jindra Košťálová	(West Germany) 1966 Dortmund	Women's team
Gold	Věra Čáslavská	(West Germany) 1966 Dortmund	Women's all-around
Gold	Věra Čáslavská	(West Germany) 1966 Dortmund	Women's vault
Silver	Věra Čáslavská	(West Germany) 1966 Dortmund	Women's balance beam
Silver	Věra Čáslavská	(West Germany) 1966 Dortmund	Women's floor exercise
Bronze	Soňa Brázdová, Luba Krasna, Hana Lišková, Marianna Némethová-Krajčírová, Bohumila Řimnáčová, Marcella Váchová	(Socialist Federal Republic of Yugoslavia) 1970 Ljubljana	Women's team
Bronze	Božena Perdykulová	(Bulgaria) 1974 Varna	Women's vault
Gold	Věra Černá	(United States) 1979 Fort Worth	Women's balance beam
Silver	Hana Říčná	(Hungary) 1983 Budapest	Women's balance beam
Bronze	Hana Říčná	(Canada) 1985 Montreal	Women's uneven bars

== Medal tables ==
=== By gender ===
Gender	Gold	Silver	Bronze	Total
Men	28	24	24	76
Women	11	13	6	30

=== By event ===
Event	Gold	Silver	Bronze	Total
Men's team	7	2	2	11
Men's rings	6	2	5	13
Men's individual all-around	4	6	7	17
Men's horizontal bar	4	3	3	10
Women's individual all-around	3	4	1	8
Men's pommel horse	3	3	4	10
Women's team	3	2	2	7
Women's balance beam	2	3	0	5
Women's vault	2	0	1	3
Men's vault	2	0	0	2
Men's parallel bars	1	6	3	10
Women's floor exercise	1	2	1	4
Men's floor exercise	1	2	0	3
Women's uneven bars	0	2	1	3
