= World Artistic Gymnastics Championships – Men's rings =

The men's still rings competition was an inaugural event at the World Artistic Gymnastics Championships. It was not held in 1905 or 1907.

Starting from 1922 when scoring of individual events began, medals are awarded: gold for first place, silver for second place, and bronze for third place. Tie breakers have not been used in every year. In the event of a tie between two gymnasts, both names are listed, and the following position (second for a tie for first, third for a tie for second) is left empty because a medal was not awarded for that position. If three gymnastics tied for a position, the following two positions are left empty.

== Medalists ==
Bold number in brackets denotes record number of victories.

Year	Location	Gold	Silver	Bronze
1903	(Belgium) Antwerp	(France) Joseph Martinez	(France) Joseph Lux (Belgium) François Walravens	—N/a
1905	(France) Bordeaux	No rings event held		
1907	(Austria-Hungary) Prague	No rings event held		
1909	Luxembourg	(Italy) Guido Romano (France) Marco Torrès	—N/a	(Bohemia) František Erben (Italy) Angelo Mozzoncini (Italy) Giorgio Zampori
1911	(Italy) Turin	(Bohemia) Ferdinand Steiner	(Italy) Pietro Bianchi (France) Antoine Costa (France) Dominique Follacci	—N/a
1913	(France) Paris	(Italy) Guido Boni (France) Laurent Grech (France) Marco Torrès (Italy) Giorgio Zampori	—N/a	—N/a
1915–1917	Not held due to World War I			
1922	(Kingdom of Yugoslavia) Ljubljana	(Czechoslovakia) Miroslav Karásek (Czechoslovakia) Josef Malý (Kingdom of Yugoslavia) Leon Štukelj (Kingdom of Yugoslavia) Peter Šumi	—N/a	—N/a
1926	(France) Lyon	(Kingdom of Yugoslavia) Leon Štukelj	(Czechoslovakia) Ladislav Vácha	(Czechoslovakia) Bedřich Šupčík
1930	Luxembourg	(Czechoslovakia) Emanuel Löffler	(Czechoslovakia) Bedřich Šupčík	(Czechoslovakia) Jan Gajdoš
1934	(Hungary) Budapest	(Czechoslovakia) Alois Hudec	(Switzerland) Eugen Mack	(Czechoslovakia) Jaroslav Kollinger (Luxembourg) Mathias Logelin
1938	(Czechoslovakia) Prague	(Czechoslovakia) Alois Hudec	(Switzerland) Michael Reusch	(Czechoslovakia) Vratislav Petráček
1942	Not held due to World War II			
1950	(Switzerland) Basel	(Switzerland) Walter Lehmann	(Finland) Olavi Rove	(Switzerland) Hans Eugster
1954	(Italy) Rome	(Soviet Union) Albert Azaryan	(Soviet Union) Yevgeny Korolkov	(Soviet Union) Valentin Muratov
1958	(Soviet Union) Moscow	(Soviet Union) Albert Azaryan	(Japan) Nobuyuki Aihara	(Soviet Union) Yuri Titov
1962	(Czechoslovakia) Prague	(Soviet Union) Yuri Titov	(Japan) Yukio Endō (Soviet Union) Boris Shakhlin	—N/a
1966	(West Germany) Dortmund	(Soviet Union) Mikhail Voronin	(Japan) Akinori Nakayama	(Italy) Franco Menichelli
1970	(Socialist Federal Republic of Yugoslavia) Ljubljana	(Japan) Akinori Nakayama	(Japan) Mitsuo Tsukahara	(Soviet Union) Mikhail Voronin
1974	(Bulgaria) Varna	(Soviet Union) Nikolai Andrianov (Romania) Dan Grecu	—N/a	(Poland) Andrzej Szajna
1978	(France) Strasbourg	(Soviet Union) Nikolai Andrianov	(Soviet Union) Alexander Dityatin	(Romania) Dan Grecu
1979	(United States) Fort Worth	(Soviet Union) Alexander Dityatin	(Romania) Dan Grecu	(Soviet Union) Aleksandr Tkachyov
1981	(Soviet Union) Moscow	(Soviet Union) Alexander Dityatin	(China) Huang Yubin	(Soviet Union) Bohdan Makuts
1983	(Hungary) Budapest	(Soviet Union) Dmitry Bilozerchev (Japan) Kōji Gushiken	—N/a	(China) Li Ning
1985	(Canada) Montreal	(Soviet Union) Yuri Korolyov (China) Li Ning	—N/a	(Soviet Union) Yuri Balobanov (Japan) Kyoji Yamawaki
1987	(Netherlands) Rotterdam	(Soviet Union) Yuri Korolyov	(Soviet Union) Dmitry Bilozerchev (China) Li Ning	—N/a
1989	(West Germany) Stuttgart	(West Germany) Andreas Aguilar	(East Germany) Andreas Wecker	(Italy) Jury Chechi (Soviet Union) Vitaly Marinich
1991	(United States) Indianapolis	(Soviet Union) Hrihoriy Misyutin	(Germany) Andreas Wecker	(Italy) Jury Chechi
1992	(France) Paris	(Commonwealth of Independent States) Vitaly Scherbo	(Hungary) Szilveszter Csollány	(Commonwealth of Independent States) Hrihoriy Misyutin
1993	(United Kingdom) Birmingham	(Italy) Jury Chechi	(Germany) Andreas Wecker	(Belarus) Ivan Ivankov
1994	(Australia) Brisbane	(Italy) Jury Chechi	(United States) Paul O'Neill	(Germany) Valery Belenky (Romania) Dan Burincă
1995	(Japan) Sabae	(Italy) Jury Chechi	(Romania) Dan Burincă	(Bulgaria) Yordan Yovchev
1996	(Puerto Rico) San Juan	(Italy) Jury Chechi	(Hungary) Szilveszter Csollány (Bulgaria) Yordan Yovchev	—N/a
1997	(Switzerland) Lausanne	(Italy) Jury Chechi (5)	(Hungary) Szilveszter Csollány	(Belarus) Ivan Ivankov
1999	(China) Tianjin	(China) Dong Zhen	(Hungary) Szilveszter Csollány	(Greece) Dimosthenis Tampakos
2001	(Belgium) Ghent	(Bulgaria) Yordan Yovchev	(Hungary) Szilveszter Csollány	(Italy) Andrea Coppolino
2002	(Hungary) Debrecen	(Hungary) Szilveszter Csollány	(Bulgaria) Yordan Yovchev	(Italy) Matteo Morandi
2003	(United States) Anaheim	(Greece) Dimosthenis Tampakos (Bulgaria) Yordan Yovchev	—N/a	(Italy) Andrea Coppolino (Italy) Matteo Morandi
2005	(Australia) Melbourne	(Netherlands) Yuri van Gelder	(Russia) Aleksandr Safoshkin	(Italy) Matteo Morandi
2006	(Denmark) Aarhus	(China) Chen Yibing	(Bulgaria) Yordan Yovchev	(Netherlands) Yuri van Gelder
2007	(Germany) Stuttgart	(China) Chen Yibing	(Netherlands) Yuri van Gelder	(Bulgaria) Yordan Yovchev
2009	(United Kingdom) London	(China) Yan Mingyong	(Bulgaria) Yordan Yovchev	(Ukraine) Oleksandr Vorobiov
2010	(Netherlands) Rotterdam	(China) Chen Yibing	(China) Yan Mingyong	(Italy) Matteo Morandi
2011	(Japan) Tokyo	(China) Chen Yibing	(Brazil) Arthur Zanetti	(Japan) Koji Yamamuro
2013	(Belgium) Antwerp	(Brazil) Arthur Zanetti	(Russia) Aleksandr Balandin	(United States) Brandon Wynn
2014	(China) Nanning	(China) Liu Yang	(Brazil) Arthur Zanetti	(Russia) Denis Ablyazin (China) You Hao
2015	(United Kingdom) Glasgow	(Greece) Eleftherios Petrounias	(China) You Hao	(China) Liu Yang
2017	(Canada) Montreal	(Greece) Eleftherios Petrounias	(Russia) Denis Ablyazin	(China) Liu Yang
2018	(Qatar) Doha	(Greece) Eleftherios Petrounias	(Brazil) Arthur Zanetti	(Italy) Marco Lodadio
2019	(Germany) Stuttgart	(Turkey) İbrahim Çolak	(Italy) Marco Lodadio	(France) Samir Aït Saïd
2021	(Japan) Kitakyushu	(China) Lan Xingyu	(Italy) Marco Lodadio	Grigorii Klimentev (Italy) Salvatore Maresca
2022	(United Kingdom) Liverpool	(Turkey) Adem Asil	(China) Zou Jingyuan	(United Kingdom) Courtney Tulloch
2023	(Belgium) Antwerp	(China) Liu Yang	(Greece) Eleftherios Petrounias	(China) You Hao
2025	(Indonesia) Jakarta	(United States) Donnell Whittenburg	(Turkey) Adem Asil	(China) Lan Xingyu
2026	(Netherlands) Rotterdam	(China) Lan Xingyu	(Greece) Eleftherios Petrounias	(Armenia) Artur Avetisyan

== All-time medal count ==
Last updated after the 2026 World Championships.

Rank	Nation	Gold	Silver	Bronze	Total
1	Soviet Union	12	4	7	23
2	China	11	5	6	22
3	Italy	8	3	13	24
4	Czechoslovakia	5	2	4	11
5	France	4	3	1	8
6	Greece	4	2	1	7
7	Yugoslavia	3	0	0	3
8	Bulgaria	2	4	2	8
8	Japan	2	4	2	8
10	Turkey	2	1	0	3
11	Hungary	1	5	0	6
12	Brazil	1	3	0	4
13	Romania	1	2	2	5
14	Switzerland	1	2	1	4
15	Netherlands	1	1	1	3
15	United States	1	1	1	3
17	Bohemia ^{[a]}	1	0	1	2
17	CIS ^{[b]}	1	0	1	2
19	West Germany	1	0	0	1
20	Russia	0	3	1	4
21	Germany	0	2	1	3
22	Belgium	0	1	0	1
22	East Germany	0	1	0	1
22	Finland	0	1	0	1
25	Belarus	0	0	2	2
26	Armenia	0	0	1	1
26	Great Britain	0	0	1	1
26	Luxembourg	0	0	1	1
26	Poland	0	0	1	1
26	Russian Gymnastics Federation ^{[c]}	0	0	1	1
26	Ukraine	0	0	1	1
Totals (31 entries)		62	50	53	165

Notes

- ^[a] Official FIG documents credit medals earned by athletes from Bohemia as medals for Czechoslovakia.
- ^[b] Official FIG documents credit medals earned by athletes from former Soviet Union at the 1992 World Artistic Gymnastics Championships in Paris, France, as medals for CIS (Commonwealth of Independent States).
- ^[c] At the 2021 World Artistic Gymnastics Championships in Kitakyushu, Japan, in accordance with a ban by the World Anti-Doping Agency (WADA) and a decision by the Court of Arbitration for Sport (CAS), athletes from Russia were not permitted to use the Russian name, flag, or anthem. They instead participated under name and flag of the RGF (Russian Gymnastics Federation).

== Multiple medalists ==
Rank	Gymnast	Nation	Years	Gold	Silver	Bronze	Total
1	Jury Chechi	Italy	1989–1997	5	0	2	7
2	Chen Yibing	China	2006–2011	4	0	0	4
3	Eleftherios Petrounias	Greece	2015–2026	3	2	0	5
4	Yordan Yovchev	Bulgaria	1995–2009	2	4	2	8
5	Alexander Dityatin	Soviet Union	1978–1981	2	1	0	3
6	Liu Yang	China	2014–2023	2	0	2	4
7	Lan Xingyu	China	2021–2026	2	0	1	3
8	Nikolai Andrianov	Soviet Union	1974–1978	2	0	0	2
8	Albert Azaryan	Soviet Union	1954–1958	2	0	0	2
8	Alois Hudec	Czechoslovakia	1934–1938	2	0	0	2
8	Yuri Korolyov	Soviet Union	1985–1987	2	0	0	2
8	Leon Štukelj	Yugoslavia	1922–1926	2	0	0	2
8	Marco Torrès	France	1909–1913	2	0	0	2
14	Szilveszter Csollány	Hungary	1992–2002	1	5	0	6
15	Arthur Zanetti	Brazil	2011–2018	1	3	0	4
16	Dan Grecu	Romania	1974–1979	1	1	1	3
16	Li Ning	China	1983–1987	1	1	1	3
16	Yuri van Gelder	Netherlands	2005–2007	1	1	1	3
19	Adem Asil	Turkey	2022–2025	1	1	0	2
19	Dmitry Bilozerchev	Soviet Union	1983–1987	1	1	0	2
19	Akinori Nakayama	Japan	1966–1970	1	1	0	2
19	Yan Mingyong	China	2009–2010	1	1	0	2
23	Hrihoriy Misyutin	Soviet Union; CIS	1991–1992	1	0	1	2
23	Dimosthenis Tampakos	Greece	1999–2003	1	0	1	2
23	Yuri Titov	Soviet Union	1958–1962	1	0	1	2
23	Mikhail Voronin	Soviet Union	1966–1970	1	0	1	2
23	Giorgio Zampori	Italy	1909–1913	1	0	1	2
28	Andreas Wecker	East Germany; Germany	1989–1993	0	3	0	3
29	Marco Lodadio	Italy	2018–2021	0	2	1	3
30	You Hao	China	2014–2023	0	1	2	3
31	Denis Ablyazin	Russia	2014–2017	0	1	1	2
31	Dan Burincă	Romania	1994–1995	0	1	1	2
31	Bedřich Šupčík	Czechoslovakia	1926–1930	0	1	1	2
34	Matteo Morandi	Italy	2002–2010	0	0	4	4
35	Andrea Coppolino	Italy	2001–2003	0	0	2	2
35	Ivan Ivankov	Belarus	1993–1997	0	0	2	2
