= World Artistic Gymnastics Championships – Men's parallel bars =

The men's parallel bars competition was an inaugural event at the World Artistic Gymnastics Championships. It has been held in every year since its inception.

The first event was in 1903, and followed every other year until and including 1913. Competitions were not held during World War I, ultimately returning in 1922, and was then held every fourth year, until and including 1942. Competitions resumed after World War II, starting in 1950. It continued every fourth even year until and including 1978. The next event was held a year later, when the schedule was switched to an every-odd year until and including 1991. It then became an annual event, until and including 1997. It was next held in 1999. During the 21st century, the World Championships became an annual event held each non-Summer Olympic year.

Three medals are awarded: gold for first place, silver for second place, and bronze for third place. Tie breakers have not been used in every year. In the event of a tie between two gymnasts, both names are listed, and the following position (second for a tie for first, third for a tie for second) is left empty because a medal was not awarded for that position.

== Medalists ==
Bold numbers in brackets denotes record number of victories.

Year	Location	Gold	Silver	Bronze
1903	(Belgium) Antwerp	(Luxembourg) François Hentges (France) Joseph Martinez	—N/a	(Luxembourg) André Bordang (Belgium) Eugène Dua
1905	(France) Bordeaux	(France) Marcel Lalu (France) Joseph Martinez	—N/a	(France) Pierre Payssé
1907	(Austria-Hungary) Prague	(France) Joseph Lux	(Bohemia) Josef Čada	(Bohemia) František Erben (France) Louis Ségura
1909	Luxembourg	(France) Joseph Martinez	(Bohemia) Josef Čada (France) Auguste Castille (France) Marco Torrès	—N/a
1911	(Italy) Turin	(Italy) Giorgio Zampori	(France) Dominique Follacci	(France) Antoine Costa (France) Jules Labéeu (France) Jules Lecoutre (Italy) Paolo Salvi (Bohemia) Ferdinand Steiner (Austria-Hungary) Stane Vidmar
1913	(France) Paris	(Italy) Guido Boni (Italy) Giorgio Zampori	—N/a	(Luxembourg) Pierre Hentges
1915–1917	Not held due to World War I			
1922	(Kingdom of Yugoslavia) Ljubljana	(Kingdom of Yugoslavia) Leon Štukelj	(Kingdom of Yugoslavia) Stane Derganc (Czechoslovakia) Stanislav Indruch (Czechoslovakia) Miroslav Klinger (Kingdom of Yugoslavia) Vladimir Simončič (Kingdom of Yugoslavia) Stane Vidmar	—N/a
1926	(France) Lyon	(Czechoslovakia) Ladislav Vácha	(Czechoslovakia) Jan Gajdoš	(Kingdom of Yugoslavia) Leon Štukelj
1930	Luxembourg	(Kingdom of Yugoslavia) Josip Primožič	(France) Alfred Krauss	(Czechoslovakia) Ladislav Vácha
1934	(Hungary) Budapest	(Switzerland) Eugen Mack	(Switzerland) Josef Walter	(Switzerland) Walter Bach
1938	(Czechoslovakia) Prague	(Switzerland) Michael Reusch	(Czechoslovakia) Alois Hudec	(Kingdom of Yugoslavia) Josip Primožič
1942	Not held due to World War II			
1950	(Switzerland) Basel	(Switzerland) Hans Eugster	(Finland) Olavi Rove	(France) Raymond Dot
1954	(Italy) Rome	(Soviet Union) Viktor Chukarin	(Switzerland) Josef Stalder	(West Germany) Helmut Bantz (Switzerland) Hans Eugster (Japan) Masao Takemoto
1958	(Soviet Union) Moscow	(Soviet Union) Boris Shakhlin	(Japan) Takashi Ono	(Soviet Union) Pavel Stolbov
1962	(Czechoslovakia) Prague	(Socialist Federal Republic of Yugoslavia) Miroslav Cerar	(Soviet Union) Boris Shakhlin	(Japan) Yukio Endō
1966	(West Germany) Dortmund	(Soviet Union) Sergey Diomidov	(Soviet Union) Mikhail Voronin	(Socialist Federal Republic of Yugoslavia) Miroslav Cerar
1970	(Socialist Federal Republic of Yugoslavia) Ljubljana	(Japan) Akinori Nakayama	(Japan) Eizō Kenmotsu (Soviet Union) Mikhail Voronin	—N/a
1974	(Bulgaria) Varna	(Japan) Eizō Kenmotsu	(Soviet Union) Nikolai Andrianov	(Soviet Union) Vladimir Marchenko
1978	(France) Strasbourg	(Japan) Eizō Kenmotsu	(Soviet Union) Nikolai Andrianov (Japan) Hiroshi Kajiyama	—N/a
1979	(United States) Fort Worth	(United States) Bart Conner	(United States) Kurt Thomas (Soviet Union) Aleksandr Tkachyov	—N/a
1981	(Soviet Union) Moscow	(Soviet Union) Alexander Dityatin (Japan) Kōji Gushiken	—N/a	(Japan) Nobuyuki Kajitani
1983	(Hungary) Budapest	(Soviet Union) Vladimir Artemov (China) Lou Yun	—N/a	(Japan) Kōji Sotomura (China) Tong Fei
1985	(Canada) Montreal	(East Germany) Sylvio Kroll (Soviet Union) Valentin Mogilny	—N/a	(Japan) Kōji Gushiken
1987	(Netherlands) Rotterdam	(Soviet Union) Vladimir Artemov	(Soviet Union) Dmitry Bilozerchev	(East Germany) Sven Tippelt
1989	(West Germany) Stuttgart	(Soviet Union) Vladimir Artemov (China) Li Jing	—N/a	(East Germany) Andreas Wecker
1991	(United States) Indianapolis	(China) Li Jing	(Soviet Union) Ihor Korobchynskyi	(China) Guo Linyao
1992	(France) Paris	(China) Li Jing (Commonwealth of Independent States) Aleksey Voropayev	—N/a	(Commonwealth of Independent States) Valery Belenky
1993	(United Kingdom) Birmingham	(Belarus) Vitaly Scherbo	(Ukraine) Ihor Korobchynskyi	Valery Belenky (UNA) ^{[d]}
1994	(Australia) Brisbane	(China) Huang Liping	(Ukraine) Rustam Sharipov	(Russia) Alexei Nemov
1995	(Japan) Sabae	(Belarus) Vitaly Scherbo	(China) Huang Liping	(Japan) Hikaru Tanaka
1996	(Puerto Rico) San Juan	(Ukraine) Rustam Sharipov	(Russia) Alexei Nemov (Belarus) Vitaly Scherbo	—N/a
1997	(Switzerland) Lausanne	(China) Zhang Jinjing	(China) Li Xiaopeng	(Japan) Naoya Tsukahara
1999	(China) Tianjin	(South Korea) Lee Joo-hyung	(Russia) Alexei Bondarenko (Japan) Naoya Tsukahara	—N/a
2001	(Belgium) Ghent	(United States) Sean Townsend	(Cuba) Erick López	(Belarus) Ivan Ivankov
2002	(Hungary) Debrecen	(China) Li Xiaopeng	(Slovenia) Mitja Petkovšek	(Belarus) Alexei Sinkevich
2003	(United States) Anaheim	(China) Li Xiaopeng	(China) Huang Xu (Russia) Alexei Nemov	—N/a
2005	(Australia) Melbourne	(Slovenia) Mitja Petkovšek	(China) Li Xiaopeng	(France) Yann Cucherat
2006	(Denmark) Aarhus	(China) Yang Wei	(Japan) Hiroyuki Tomita (South Korea) Yoo Won-chul	—N/a
2007	(Germany) Stuttgart	(South Korea) Kim Dae-eun (Slovenia) Mitja Petkovšek	—N/a	(Uzbekistan) Anton Fokin
2009	(United Kingdom) London	(China) Wang Guanyin	(China) Feng Zhe	(Japan) Kazuhito Tanaka
2010	(Netherlands) Rotterdam	(China) Feng Zhe	(China) Teng Haibin	(Japan) Kōhei Uchimura
2011	(Japan) Tokyo	(United States) Danell Leyva	(Greece) Vasileios Tsolakidis (China) Zhang Chenglong	—N/a
2013	(Belgium) Antwerp	(China) Lin Chaopan (Japan) Kōhei Uchimura	—N/a	(United States) John Orozco
2014	(China) Nanning	(Ukraine) Oleg Verniaiev	(United States) Danell Leyva	(Japan) Ryōhei Katō
2015	(United Kingdom) Glasgow	(China) You Hao	(Ukraine) Oleg Verniaiev	(China) Deng Shudi (Azerbaijan) Oleg Stepko
2017	(Canada) Montreal	(China) Zou Jingyuan	(Ukraine) Oleg Verniaiev	(Russia) David Belyavskiy
2018	(Qatar) Doha	(China) Zou Jingyuan	(Ukraine) Oleg Verniaiev	(Russia) Artur Dalaloyan
2019	(Germany) Stuttgart	(United Kingdom) Joe Fraser	(Turkey) Ahmet Önder	(Japan) Kazuma Kaya
2021	(Japan) Kitakyushu	(China) Hu Xuwei	(Philippines) Carlos Yulo	(China) Shi Cong
2022	(United Kingdom) Liverpool	(China) Zou Jingyuan	(Germany) Lukas Dauser	(Philippines) Carlos Yulo
2023	(Belgium) Antwerp	(Germany) Lukas Dauser	(China) Shi Cong	(Japan) Kaito Sugimoto
2025	(Indonesia) Jakarta	(China) Zou Jingyuan	(Japan) Tomoharu Tsunogai	(Individual Neutral Athletes) Daniel Marinov
2026	(Netherlands) Rotterdam	(China) Zou Jingyuan (5)	(Croatia) Illia Kovtun	(Russia) Daniel Marinov ^{[e]}

== All-time medal count ==
Last updated after the 2026 World Championships.

Rank	Nation	Gold	Silver	Bronze	Total
1	China	19	8	4	31
2	Soviet Union	8	8	2	18
3	Japan	5	6	12	23
4	France	5	4	7	16
5	Yugoslavia	3	3	3	9
6	Switzerland	3	2	2	7
7	United States	3	2	1	6
8	Italy	3	0	1	4
9	Ukraine	2	5	0	7
10	Belarus	2	1	2	5
11	Slovenia	2	1	0	3
11	South Korea	2	1	0	3
13	Czechoslovakia	1	4	1	6
14	Germany	1	1	0	2
15	East Germany	1	0	2	3
15	Luxembourg	1	0	2	3
17	CIS ^{[c]}	1	0	1	2
18	Great Britain	1	0	0	1
19	Russia ^{[e]}	0	3	4	7
20	Bohemia ^{[a]}	0	2	2	4
21	Philippines	0	1	1	2
22	Croatia	0	1	0	1
22	Cuba	0	1	0	1
22	Finland	0	1	0	1
22	Greece	0	1	0	1
22	Turkey	0	1	0	1
27	Austria-Hungary ^{[b]}	0	0	1	1
27	Azerbaijan	0	0	1	1
27	Belgium	0	0	1	1
27	Uzbekistan	0	0	1	1
27	West Germany	0	0	1	1
–	Individual Neutral Athletes	0	0	1	1
–	Unattached athlete ^{[d]}	0	0	1	1
Totals (31 entries)		63	57	54	174

Notes

- ^[a] Official FIG documents credit medals earned by athletes from Bohemia as medals for Czechoslovakia.
- ^[b] Official FIG documents credit medals earned by athletes from Austria-Hungary as medals for Yugoslavia.
- ^[c] Official FIG documents credit medals earned by athletes from former Soviet Union at the 1992 World Artistic Gymnastics Championships in Paris, France, as medals for CIS (Commonwealth of Independent States).
- ^[d] At the 1993 World Artistic Gymnastics Championships in Birmingham, Great Britain, Azerbaijani-born athlete Valery Belenky earned a bronze medal competing as an unattached athlete (UNA) because Azerbaijan did not have a gymnastics federation for him to compete. Later, official FIG documents credit his medal as a medal for Germany.
- ^[e] At the 2026 World Artistic Gymnastics Championships in Rotterdam, the Netherlands, Russia competed under the name "World Gymnastics 2" (WG2) due to regulations by the Dutch authorities. World Gymnastics still credit medals earned by Russian athletes at these championships as medals for Russia.

== Multiple medalists ==
Rank	Gymnast	Nation	Years	Gold	Silver	Bronze	Total
1	Zou Jingyuan	China	2017–2026	5	0	0	5
2	Vladimir Artemov	Soviet Union	1983–1989	3	0	0	3
2	Li Jing	China	1989–1992	3	0	0	3
2	Joseph Martinez	France	1903–1909	3	0	0	3
5	Li Xiaopeng	China	1997–2005	2	2	0	4
6	Eizō Kenmotsu	Japan	1970–1978	2	1	0	3
6	Mitja Petkovšek	Slovenia	2002–2007	2	1	0	3
6	Vitaly Scherbo	Belarus	1993–1996	2	1	0	3
9	Giorgio Zampori	Italy	1911–1913	2	0	0	2
10	Oleg Verniaiev	Ukraine	2014–2018	1	3	0	4
11	Lukas Dauser	Germany	2022–2023	1	1	0	2
11	Feng Zhe	China	2009–2010	1	1	0	2
11	Huang Liping	China	1994–1995	1	1	0	2
11	Danell Leyva	United States	2011–2014	1	1	0	2
11	Boris Shakhlin	Soviet Union	1958–1962	1	1	0	2
11	Rustam Sharipov	Ukraine	1994–1996	1	1	0	2
17	Miroslav Cerar	Yugoslavia	1962–1966	1	0	1	2
17	Hans Eugster	Switzerland	1950–1954	1	0	1	2
17	Kōji Gushiken	Japan	1981–1985	1	0	1	2
17	Josip Primožič	Yugoslavia	1930–1938	1	0	1	2
17	Leon Štukelj	Yugoslavia	1922–1926	1	0	1	2
17	Kōhei Uchimura	Japan	2010–2013	1	0	1	2
17	Ladislav Vácha	Czechoslovakia	1926–1930	1	0	1	2
24	Alexei Nemov	Russia	1994–2003	0	2	1	3
25	Nikolai Andrianov	Soviet Union	1974–1978	0	2	0	2
25	Josef Čada	Bohemia	1907–1909	0	2	0	2
25	Ihor Korobchynskyi	Soviet Union; Ukraine	1991–1993	0	2	0	2
25	Mikhail Voronin	Soviet Union	1966–1970	0	2	0	2
29	Shi Cong	China	2021–2023	0	1	1	2
29	Naoya Tsukahara	Japan	1997–1999	0	1	1	2
29	Stane Vidmar	Austria-Hungary; Yugoslavia	1911–1922	0	1	1	2
29	Carlos Yulo	Philippines	2021–2022	0	1	1	2
33	Valery Belenky	CIS; Unattached athlete ^{[d]}	1992–1993	0	0	2	2
33	Daniel Marinov	Russia; Individual Neutral Athletes	2025–2026	0	0	2	2
