= World Artistic Gymnastics Championships – Men's individual all-around =

The men's individual all around event was first awarded at the 1922 Artistic Gymnastics World Championships, though individual performances at earlier games have been scored retrospectively by FIG. It was not held in 1992, 1996, and 2002.

Three medals are awarded: gold for first place, silver for second place, and bronze for third place. Tie breakers have not been used in every year. In the event of a tie between two gymnasts, both names are listed, and the following position (second for a tie for first, third for a tie for second) is left empty because a medal was not awarded for that position. If three gymnastics tied for a position, the following two positions are left empty.

== Medalists ==
Bold number in brackets denotes record number of victories.

Year	Location	Gold	Silver	Bronze
1903	(Belgium) Antwerp	(France) Joseph Martinez	(France) Joseph Lux (Belgium) Georges Wierincky	—N/a
1905	(France) Bordeaux	(France) Marcel Lalu	(France) Daniel Lavielle	(France) Lucien Démanet
1907	(Austria-Hungary) Prague	(Bohemia) Josef Čada	(France) Jules Rolland	(Bohemia) František Erben
1909	Luxembourg	(France) Marco Torrès	(Bohemia) Josef Čada	(France) Armand Coidelle
1911	(Italy) Turin	(Bohemia) Ferdinand Steiner	(Bohemia) Josef Čada	(Bohemia) Karel Stary (Bohemia) Svatopluk Svoboda
1913	(France) Paris	(France) Marco Torrès	(Bohemia) Karel Stary	(Bohemia) Josef Sykora
1915–1917	Not held due to World War I			
1922	(Kingdom of Yugoslavia) Ljubljana	(Czechoslovakia) František Pecháček (Kingdom of Yugoslavia) Peter Šumi	—N/a	(Kingdom of Yugoslavia) Stane Derganc
1926	(France) Lyon	(Kingdom of Yugoslavia) Peter Šumi	(Czechoslovakia) Josef Effenberger	(Czechoslovakia) Ladislav Vácha
1930	Luxembourg	(Kingdom of Yugoslavia) Josip Primožič	(Czechoslovakia) Jan Gajdoš	(Czechoslovakia) Emanuel Löffler
1934	(Hungary) Budapest	(Switzerland) Eugen Mack	(Italy) Romeo Neri	(Czechoslovakia) Emanuel Löffler
1938	(Czechoslovakia) Prague	(Czechoslovakia) Jan Gajdoš	(Czechoslovakia) Jan Sládek	(Switzerland) Eugen Mack
1942	Not held due to World War II			
1950	(Switzerland) Basel	(Switzerland) Walther Lehmann	(Switzerland) Marcel Adatte	(Finland) Olavi Rove
1954	(Italy) Rome	(Soviet Union) Viktor Chukarin (Soviet Union) Valentin Muratov	—N/a	(Soviet Union) Hrant Shahinyan
1958	(Soviet Union) Moscow	(Soviet Union) Boris Shakhlin	(Japan) Takashi Ono	(Soviet Union) Yuri Titov
1962	(Czechoslovakia) Prague	(Soviet Union) Yuri Titov	(Japan) Yukio Endō	(Soviet Union) Boris Shakhlin
1966	(West Germany) Dortmund	(Soviet Union) Mikhail Voronin	(Japan) Shuji Tsurumi	(Japan) Akinori Nakayama
1970	(Socialist Federal Republic of Yugoslavia) Ljubljana	(Japan) Eizō Kenmotsu	(Japan) Mitsuo Tsukahara	(Japan) Akinori Nakayama
1974	(Bulgaria) Varna	(Japan) Shigeru Kasamatsu	(Soviet Union) Nikolai Andrianov	(Japan) Eizō Kenmotsu
1978	(France) Strasbourg	(Soviet Union) Nikolai Andrianov	(Japan) Eizō Kenmotsu	(Soviet Union) Alexander Dityatin
1979	(United States) Fort Worth	(Soviet Union) Alexander Dityatin	(United States) Kurt Thomas	(Soviet Union) Aleksandr Tkachyov
1981	(Soviet Union) Moscow	(Soviet Union) Yuri Korolyov	(Soviet Union) Bohdan Makuts	(Japan) Kōji Gushiken
1983	(Hungary) Budapest	(Soviet Union) Dmitry Bilozerchev	(Japan) Kōji Gushiken	(Soviet Union) Artur Akopyan (China) Lou Yun
1985	(Canada) Montreal	(Soviet Union) Yuri Korolyov	(Soviet Union) Vladimir Artemov	(East Germany) Sylvio Kroll
1987	(Netherlands) Rotterdam	(Soviet Union) Dmitry Bilozerchev	(Soviet Union) Yuri Korolyov	(Soviet Union) Vladimir Artemov
1989	(West Germany) Stuttgart	(Soviet Union) Ihor Korobchynskyi	(Soviet Union) Valentin Mogilny	(China) Li Jing
1991	(United States) Indianapolis	(Soviet Union) Hrihoriy Misyutin	(Soviet Union) Vitaly Scherbo	(Soviet Union) Valeri Liukin
1992	(France) Paris	No all-around event held		
1993	(United Kingdom) Birmingham	(Belarus) Vitaly Scherbo	(Russia) Sergey Kharkov	(Germany) Andreas Wecker
1994	(Australia) Brisbane	(Belarus) Ivan Ivankov	(Russia) Aleksey Voropayev	(Belarus) Vitaly Scherbo
1995	(Japan) Sabae	(China) Li Xiaoshuang	(Belarus) Vitaly Scherbo	(Russia) Yevgeny Shabayev
1996	(Puerto Rico) San Juan	No all-around event held		
1997	(Switzerland) Lausanne	(Belarus) Ivan Ivankov	(Russia) Alexei Bondarenko	(Japan) Naoya Tsukahara
1999	(China) Tianjin	(Russia) Nikolai Kryukov	(Japan) Naoya Tsukahara	(Bulgaria) Yordan Yovchev
2001	(Belgium) Ghent	(China) Feng Jing	(Belarus) Ivan Ivankov	(Bulgaria) Yordan Yovchev
2002	(Hungary) Debrecen	No all-around event held		
2003	(United States) Anaheim	(United States) Paul Hamm	(China) Yang Wei	(Japan) Hiroyuki Tomita
2005	(Australia) Melbourne	(Japan) Hiroyuki Tomita	(Japan) Hisashi Mizutori	(Belarus) Denis Savenkov
2006	(Denmark) Aarhus	(China) Yang Wei	(Japan) Hiroyuki Tomita	(Germany) Fabian Hambüchen
2007	(Germany) Stuttgart	(China) Yang Wei	(Germany) Fabian Hambüchen	(Japan) Hisashi Mizutori
2009	(United Kingdom) London	(Japan) Kōhei Uchimura	(United Kingdom) Daniel Keatings	(Russia) Yuri Ryazanov
2010	(Netherlands) Rotterdam	(Japan) Kōhei Uchimura	(Germany) Philipp Boy	(United States) Jonathan Horton
2011	(Japan) Tokyo	(Japan) Kōhei Uchimura	(Germany) Philipp Boy	(Japan) Koji Yamamuro
2013	(Belgium) Antwerp	(Japan) Kōhei Uchimura	(Japan) Ryōhei Katō	(Germany) Fabian Hambüchen
2014	(China) Nanning	(Japan) Kōhei Uchimura	(United Kingdom) Max Whitlock	(Japan) Yusuke Tanaka
2015	(United Kingdom) Glasgow	(Japan) Kōhei Uchimura (6)	(Cuba) Manrique Larduet	(China) Deng Shudi
2017	(Canada) Montreal	(China) Xiao Ruoteng	(China) Lin Chaopan	(Japan) Kenzō Shirai
2018	(Qatar) Doha	(Russia) Artur Dalaloyan	(China) Xiao Ruoteng	(Russia) Nikita Nagornyy
2019	(Germany) Stuttgart	(Russia) Nikita Nagornyy	(Russia) Artur Dalaloyan	(Ukraine) Oleg Verniaiev
2021	(Japan) Kitakyushu	(China) Zhang Boheng	(Japan) Daiki Hashimoto	(Ukraine) Illia Kovtun
2022	(United Kingdom) Liverpool	(Japan) Daiki Hashimoto	(China) Zhang Boheng	(Japan) Wataru Tanigawa
2023	(Belgium) Antwerp	(Japan) Daiki Hashimoto	(Ukraine) Illia Kovtun	(United States) Fred Richard
2025	(Indonesia) Jakarta	(Japan) Daiki Hashimoto	(China) Zhang Boheng	(Switzerland) Noe Seifert
2026	(Netherlands) Rotterdam	(Japan) Daiki Hashimoto	(China) Yang Haonan	(United Kingdom) Joe Fraser

== All-time medal count ==
Last updated after the 2026 World Championships.

Rank	Nation	Gold	Silver	Bronze	Total
1	Japan	13	11	11	35
2	Soviet Union	13	6	8	27
3	China	6	6	3	15
4	France	4	3	2	9
5	Russia	3	4	3	10
6	Belarus	3	2	2	7
7	Yugoslavia	3	0	1	4
8	Bohemia ^{[a]}	2	3	4	9
9	Czechoslovakia	2	3	3	8
10	Switzerland	2	1	2	5
11	United States	1	1	2	4
12	Germany	0	3	3	6
13	Great Britain	0	2	1	3
14	Ukraine	0	1	2	3
15	Belgium	0	1	0	1
15	Cuba	0	1	0	1
15	Italy	0	1	0	1
18	Bulgaria	0	0	2	2
19	East Germany	0	0	1	1
19	Finland	0	0	1	1
Totals (20 entries)		52	49	51	152

Note

- ^[a] Official FIG documents credit medals earned by athletes from Bohemia as medals for Czechoslovakia.

== Multiple medalists ==
Rank	Gymnast	Nation	Years	Gold	Silver	Bronze	Total
1	Kōhei Uchimura	Japan	2009–2015	6	0	0	6
2	Daiki Hashimoto	Japan	2021–2026	4	1	0	5
3	Ivan Ivankov	Belarus	1994–2001	2	1	0	3
3	Yuri Korolyov	Soviet Union	1981–1987	2	1	0	3
3	Yang Wei	China	2003–2007	2	1	0	3
6	Dmitry Bilozerchev	Soviet Union	1983–1987	2	0	0	2
6	Peter Šumi	Yugoslavia	1922–1926	2	0	0	2
6	Marco Torrès	France	1909–1913	2	0	0	2
9	Vitaly Scherbo	Soviet Union; Belarus	1991–1995	1	2	1	4
10	Josef Čada	Bohemia	1907–1911	1	2	0	3
10	Zhang Boheng	China	2021–2025	1	2	0	3
12	Eizō Kenmotsu	Japan	1970–1978	1	1	1	3
12	Hiroyuki Tomita	Japan	2003–2006	1	1	1	3
14	Nikolai Andrianov	Soviet Union	1974–1978	1	1	0	2
14	Artur Dalaloyan	Russia	2018–2019	1	1	0	2
14	Jan Gajdoš	Czechoslovakia	1930–1938	1	1	0	2
14	Xiao Ruoteng	China	2017–2018	1	1	0	2
18	Alexander Dityatin	Soviet Union	1978–1979	1	0	1	2
18	Eugen Mack	Switzerland	1934–1938	1	0	1	2
18	Nikita Nagornyy	Russia	2018–2019	1	0	1	2
18	Boris Shakhlin	Soviet Union	1958–1962	1	0	1	2
18	Yuri Titov	Soviet Union	1958–1962	1	0	1	2
23	Philipp Boy	Germany	2010–2011	0	2	0	2
24	Fabian Hambüchen	Germany	2006–2013	0	1	2	3
25	Vladimir Artemov	Soviet Union	1985–1987	0	1	1	2
25	Kōji Gushiken	Japan	1981–1983	0	1	1	2
25	Illia Kovtun	Ukraine	2021–2023	0	1	1	2
25	Hisashi Mizutori	Japan	2005–2007	0	1	1	2
25	Karel Starý	Bohemia	1911–1913	0	1	1	2
25	Naoya Tsukahara	Japan	1997–1999	0	1	1	2
31	Emanuel Löffler	Czechoslovakia	1930–1934	0	0	2	2
31	Akinori Nakayama	Japan	1966–1970	0	0	2	2
31	Yordan Yovchev	Bulgaria	1999–2001	0	0	2	2
