= Italy at the World Artistic Gymnastics Championships =

- Flag of Italy
- IOC code: ITA
- Website: www.federginnastica.it
- Medals: Gold 15 Silver 13 Bronze 29 Total 57

Italy first participated at the fourth World Championships held in 1909, while it was a men's-only competition. Italian women first competed in 1950.

== Medalists ==
Medal	Name	Year	Event
Bronze	Pietro Borghi, Alberto Braglia, Otello Capitani, Angelo Mazzoncini, Guido Romano, Giorgio Zampori	1909 Luxembourg	Men's team
Gold	Guido Romano	1909 Luxembourg	Men's rings
Bronze	Giorgio Zampori	1909 Luxembourg	Men's rings
Bronze	Angelo Mazzoncini	1909 Luxembourg	Men's rings
Bronze	Osvaldo Palazzi, Giorgio Zampori, Paolo Salvi, Pietro Bianchi, Guido Romano, Francesco Loi	(Italy) 1911 Turin	Men's team
Gold	Osvaldo Palazzi	(Italy) 1911 Turin	Men's pommel horse
Silver	Giorgio Zampori	(Italy) 1911 Turin	Men's pommel horse
Silver	Paolo Salvi	(Italy) 1911 Turin	Men's pommel horse
Silver	Pietro Bianchi	(Italy) 1911 Turin	Men's rings
Gold	Giorgio Zampori	(Italy) 1911 Turin	Men's parallel bars
Bronze	Paolo Salvi	(Italy) 1911 Turin	Men's parallel bars
Bronze	Guido Romano	(Italy) 1911 Turin	Men's parallel bars
Bronze	Pietro Bianchi, Guido Boni, Osvaldo Palazzi, Guido Romano, Paolo Salvi, Giorgio Zampori	(France) 1913 Paris	Men's team
Gold	Giorgio Zampori	(France) 1913 Paris	Men's pommel horse
Silver	Osvaldo Palazzi	(France) 1913 Paris	Men's pommel horse
Gold	Giorgio Zampori	(France) 1913 Paris	Men's rings
Gold	Guido Boni	(France) 1913 Paris	Men's rings
Gold	Giorgio Zampori	(France) 1913 Paris	Men's parallel bars
Gold	Guido Boni	(France) 1913 Paris	Men's parallel bars
Bronze	Osvaldo Palazzi	(France) 1913 Paris	Men's horizontal bar
Silver	Romeo Neri	(Hungary) 1934 Budapest	Men's all-around
Bronze	Romeo Neri	(Hungary) 1934 Budapest	Men's vault
Bronze	Renata Bianchi, Licia Macchini, Laura Micheli, Anna Monlarini, Marja Nutti, Elena Santoni, Liliana Scaricabarozzi, Lilia Torriani	(Switzerland) 1950 Basel	Women's team
Silver	Marja Nutti	(Switzerland) 1950 Basel	Women's balance beam
Bronze	Licia Macchini	(Switzerland) 1950 Basel	Women's balance beam
Bronze	Franco Menichelli	(Czechoslovakia) 1962 Prague	Men's floor exercise
Bronze	Franco Menichelli	(West Germany) 1966 Dortmund	Men's floor exercise
Bronze	Franco Menichelli	(West Germany) 1966 Dortmund	Men's rings
Bronze	Yuri Chechi	(West Germany) 1989 Stuttgart	Men's rings
Bronze	Yuri Chechi	(United States) 1991 Indianapolis	Men's rings
Gold	Yuri Chechi	(United Kingdom) 1993 Birmingham	Men's rings
Gold	Yuri Chechi	(Australia) 1994 Brisbane	Men's rings
Gold	Yuri Chechi	(Japan) 1995 Sabae	Men's rings
Gold	Yuri Chechi	(Puerto Rico) 1996 San Juan	Men's rings
Silver	Andrea Massucchi	(Puerto Rico) 1996 San Juan	Men's vault
Gold	Yuri Chechi	(Switzerland) 1997 Lausanne	Men's rings
Bronze	Andrea Coppolino	(Belgium) 2001 Ghent	Men's rings
Bronze	Matteo Morandi	(Hungary) 2002 Debrecen	Men's rings
Bronze	Andrea Coppolino	(United States) 2003 Anaheim	Men's rings
Bronze	Matteo Morandi	(United States) 2003 Anaheim	Men's rings
Silver	Igor Cassina	(United States) 2003 Anaheim	Men's horizontal bar
Bronze	Matteo Morandi	(Australia) 2005 Melbourne	Men's rings
Gold	Vanessa Ferrari	(Denmark) 2006 Aarhus	Women's all-around
Bronze	Vanessa Ferrari	(Denmark) 2006 Aarhus	Women's uneven bars
Bronze	Vanessa Ferrari	(Denmark) 2006 Aarhus	Women's floor exercise
Bronze	Vanessa Ferrari	(Germany) 2007 Stuttgart	Women's all-around
Bronze	Igor Cassina	(United Kingdom) 2009 London	Men's horizontal bar
Bronze	Matteo Morandi	(Netherlands) 2010 Rotterdam	Men's rings
Silver	Vanessa Ferrari	(Belgium) 2013 Antwerp	Women's floor exercise
Bronze	Marco Lodadio	(Qatar) 2018 Doha	Men's rings
Bronze	Desiree Carofiglio, Alice D'Amato, Asia D'Amato, Elisa Iorio, Giorgia Villa, Martina Maggio	(Germany) 2019 Stuttgart	Women's team
Silver	Marco Lodadio	(Germany) 2019 Stuttgart	Men's rings
Gold	Nicola Bartolini	(Japan) 2021 Kitakyushu	Men's floor exercise
Silver	Asia D'Amato	(Japan) 2021 Kitakyushu	Women's vault
Silver	Marco Lodadio	(Japan) 2021 Kitakyushu	Men's rings
Bronze	Salvatore Maresca	(Japan) 2021 Kitakyushu	Men's rings
Silver	Gabriele Targhetta	(Netherlands) 2026 Rotterdam	Men's pommel horse

== Medal tables ==
=== By gender ===
Gender	Gold	Silver	Bronze	Total
Men	14	10	23	47
Women	1	3	6	10

=== By event ===
Event	Gold	Silver	Bronze	Total
Men's rings	8	3	13	24
Men's parallel bars	3	0	2	5
Men's pommel horse	2	4	0	6
Men's floor exercise	1	0	2	3
Women's individual all-around	1	0	1	2
Men's horizontal bar	0	1	2	3
Men's vault	0	1	1	2
Women's balance beam	0	1	1	2
Women's floor exercise	0	1	1	2
Men's individual all-around	0	1	0	1
Women's vault	0	1	0	1
Men's team	0	0	3	3
Women's team	0	0	2	2
Women's uneven bars	0	0	1	1

== Junior World medalists ==
Medal	Name	Year	Event
Bronze	Lorenzo Bonicelli, Ivan Brunello, Lorenzo Minh Casali, Mirko Galimberti	(Hungary) 2019 Győr	Boys' team
Bronze	Manuel Berettera, Tommaso Brugnami, Riccardo Villa, Lorenzo Tomei	(Turkey) 2023 Antalya	Boys' team
Bronze	Caterina Gaddi, July Marano, Giulia Perotti, Matilde Ferrari	(Turkey) 2023 Antalya	Girls' team
Bronze	Riccardo Villa	(Turkey) 2023 Antalya	Boys' all-around
Bronze	Caterina Gaddi	(Turkey) 2023 Antalya	Girls' all-around
Bronze	Tommaso Brugnami	(Turkey) 2023 Antalya	Boys' floor exercise
Silver	July Marano	(Turkey) 2023 Antalya	Girls' vault
Gold	Caterina Gaddi	(Turkey) 2023 Antalya	Girls' uneven bars
Bronze	Giulia Perotti	(Turkey) 2023 Antalya	Girls' uneven bars
Bronze	Riccardo Villa	(Turkey) 2023 Antalya	Boys' rings
Gold	Tommaso Brugnami	(Turkey) 2023 Antalya	Boys' vault
Gold	Giulia Perotti	(Turkey) 2023 Antalya	Girls' floor exercise
Silver	Simone Speranza	(Philippines) 2025 Manila	Boys' floor exercise
Silver	Simone Speranza	(Philippines) 2025 Manila	Boys' rings

== See also ==
- Italy women's national artistic gymnastics team
- Italy men's national artistic gymnastics team
- List of Olympic female artistic gymnasts for Italy
