= Škvor =

Škvor is a surname. Notable people with the surname include:

- Daniel Škvor (born 1989), Czech mixed martial artist
- Josef Škvor (born 1929), Czech gymnast
