= Josef Čada =

Czech gymnast

- Josef Čada in 1924

Personal information
- Full name: Josef Čada
- Born: 30 March 1881 Prague, Austria-Hungary
- Died: 1 December 1959 (aged 78) Prague, Czechoslovakia

Gymnastics career
- Discipline: Men's artistic gymnastics
- Country represented: Czechoslovakia (1920)
- Former countries represented: Bohemia (1907–1913)
Medal record
Representing Bohemia
World Championships
Gold medal – first place	1907 Prague	Team
Gold medal – first place	1907 Prague	All-around
Gold medal – first place	1911 Turin	Team
Gold medal – first place	1911 Turin	Horizontal bar
Gold medal – first place	1913 Paris	Team
Gold medal – first place	1913 Paris	Horizontal bar
Silver medal – second place	1907 Prague	Parallel bars
Silver medal – second place	1909 Luxembourg	Team
Silver medal – second place	1909 Luxembourg	All-around
Silver medal – second place	1909 Luxembourg	Parallel bars
Silver medal – second place	1909 Luxembourg	Horizontal bar
Silver medal – second place	1911 Turin	All-around

Josef Čada (30 March 1881 – 1 December 1959) was a Czech gymnast who represented Bohemia and Czechoslovakia in Men's Artistic Gymnastics. He made his World Championships debut in 1907 at the third World Artistic Gymnastics Championships in Prague, where his team won the team all-around competition. Čada also competed for Bohemia in the 1909, 1911, and 1913 Championships, winning team medals. No individual medals were awarded in the world championships until 1922, but Josef Cada is retrospectively recognized by both the FIG (the official governing body of the sport of Artistic Gymnastics) and USAG (the official governing body of the sport of Artistic gymnastics within the USA) as the 1907 World All-Around Champion in the sport of Artistic gymnastics.

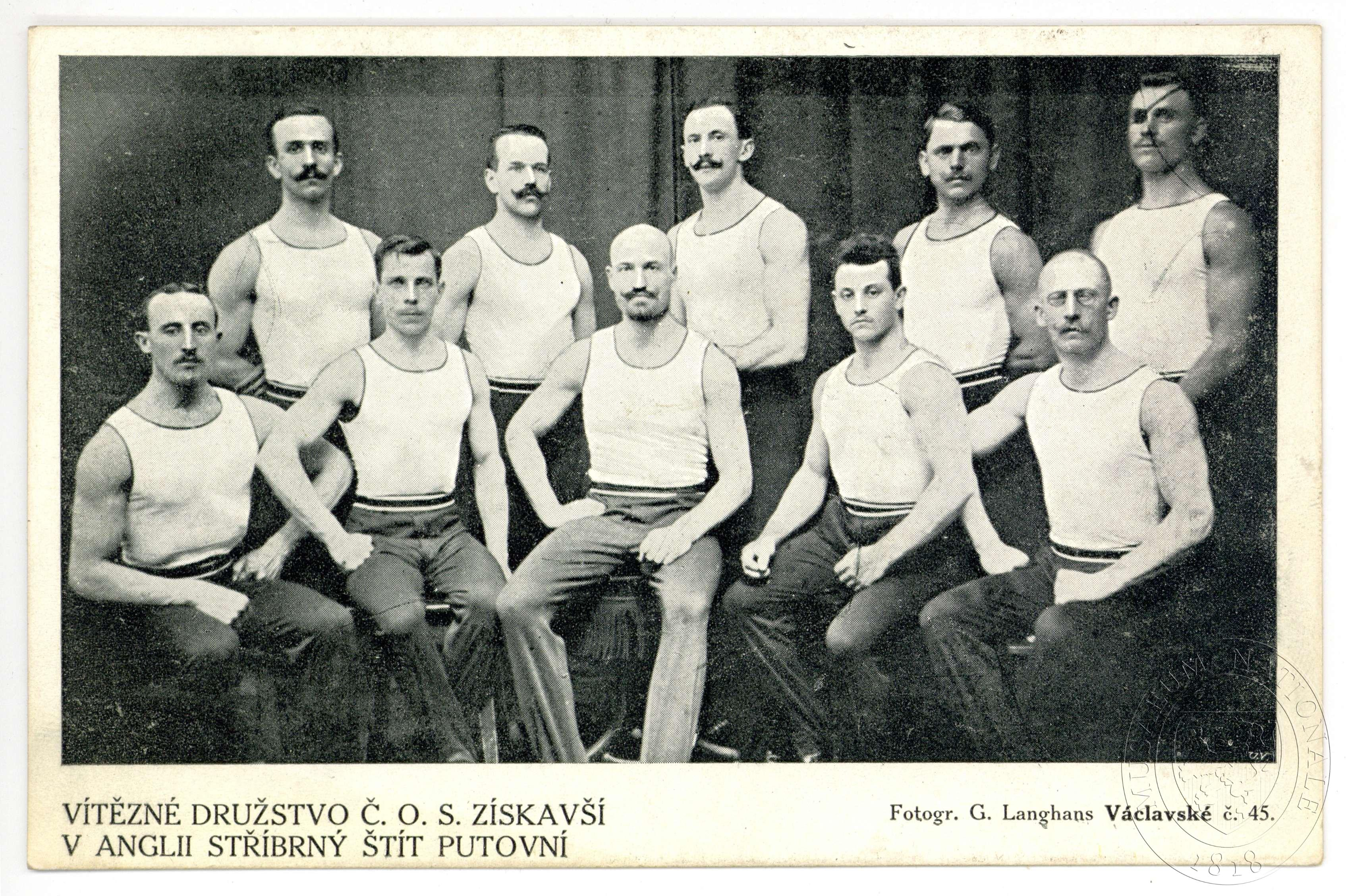
This is a postcard of the Czech Sokol delegation that competed at a tri-country gymnastics competition in London on 18 June 1910. The caption, in Czech, translates to "Winning Czech Sokol team winning the silver shield touring in England". Top row: Rud. Voška, Josef Čada, Vil. Kucek (Slovenian), František Machovský, Karel Starý. Bottom row: Svatopluk Svoboda, Václav Peča, Vl. Müller, František Vacha, Václav Svoboda. This was a three-way invitational competition between Czech, French, and English teams, which scored, respectively, 782 points, 705 points, and 633 points. The Czech team was presented with an elaborate, highly artistically rendered silver shield. The competition was held at the Northampton Institute, was attended by a huge number of spectators with many prominent representatives of the English aristocracy, and it was presided over by The Earl of Clancarty. This Czech victory occurred two years later after the 1908 Olympics, also held in London, where the Bohemians/Czechs did not field a full team, despite being the reigning World Champions from 1907, and their only two representatives, Čada and Bohumil Honzátko, placed only 25th and 36th, respectively, in the Individual All-Around, despite Čada being the reigning World All-Around Champion.

He competed in the 1908 Summer Olympics individual all-around gymnastics competition for Bohemia, placing 25th. After World War I, Čada returned to competing and represented Czechoslovakia at the 1920 Antwerp Summer Olympic Games, where he placed 4th in the team all-around competition.
