= Louis Ségura =

French gymnast

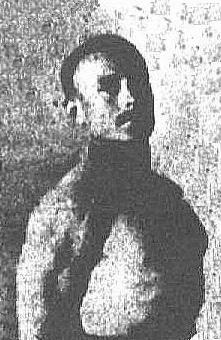
- Ségura c. 1910

Personal information
- Born: 23 July 1889 Sidi Bel Abbès, French Algeria
- Died: 1963 (aged 73–74)

Gymnastics career
- Discipline: Men's artistic gymnastics
- Country represented: France
- Club: L'Oranaise
Medal record
Olympic Games
Silver medal – second place	1912 Stockholm	individual all-around
Bronze medal – third place	1908 London	individual all-around
World Championships
Gold medal – first place	1909 Luxembourg	Team
Silver medal – second place	1907 Prague	Team
Silver medal – second place	1913 Paris	Team
Bronze medal – third place	1907 Prague	Parallel Bars

Louis Ségura (July 23, 1889 – 1963) was a French gymnast who competed in the 1908 Summer Olympics and in the 1912 Summer Olympics. He won the bronze medal in the individual all-around in 1908, as well as the silver medal in 1912. He was one of the first crop of competitive career gymnasts at the level of the World Championships and Olympic Games.

In addition to his two successful Olympic appearances, he was also a 3-time French World team member, helping his team reach the medal standings every time at the World Championships, in 1907, 1909, and 1913. Also, he was retrospectively scored in the top three individually on Parallel Bars at the 1907 World Championships.
