= Jaroslav Šťastný =

Czech gymnast

- Born: 6 April 1936 Penčice, Czechoslovakia
- Died: 28 February 2004 (aged 67) Prague, Czech Republic

Gymnastics career
- Discipline: Men's artistic gymnastics
- Country represented: Czechoslovakia

Jaroslav Šťastný (6 April 1936 – 28 February 2004) was a Czech gymnast. He competed in eight events at the 1960 Summer Olympics. He died on 28 February 2004, at the age of 67.
