= Pavel Gajdoš =

Czech gymnast (1936–2022)

- Born: 1 October 1936 Velykyi Bereznyi, Czechoslovakia
- Died: 6 December 2022 (aged 86) Prague, Czech Republic

Gymnastics career
- Discipline: Men's artistic gymnastics
- Country represented: Czechoslovakia

Pavel Gajdoš (1 October 1936 – 6 December 2022) was a Czech gymnast. He competed for Czechoslovakia at the 1960 Summer Olympics and the 1964 Summer Olympics.

Gajdoš died on 6 December 2022, at the age of 86.
