= Karel Klečka =

Czech gymnast

- Born: 1 August 1936 (age 90) Ostrava, Czechoslovakia

Gymnastics career
- Discipline: Men's artistic gymnastics
- Country represented: Czechoslovakia

Karel Klečka (born 1 August 1936) is a Czech gymnast. He competed in eight events at the 1964 Summer Olympics.
