= Otello Capitani =

Italian gymnast

- Full name: Otello Ferdinando Giuseppe Maria Capitani
- Born: 17 March 1890 Modena, Kingdom of Italy
- Died: 20 September 1912 (aged 22) Misratah, Ottoman Empire

Gymnastics career
- Discipline: Men's artistic gymnastics
- Country represented: Italy
- Gym: Società di Ginnastica e Scherma del Panaro Modena

Otello Ferdinando Giuseppe Maria Capitani (17 March 1890 – 20 September 1912) was an Italian gymnast. He competed in the men's artistic individual all-around event at the 1908 Summer Olympics. He was killed in action during the Italo-Turkish War.
