= Jaroslav Bím =

Czech gymnast

- Born: 12 January 1931 Kyjov, Czechoslovakia
- Died: 9 April 2012 (aged 81)

Gymnastics career
- Discipline: Men's artistic gymnastics
- Country represented: Czechoslovakia

Jaroslav Bím (12 January 1931 – 9 April 2012) was a Czech gymnast. He competed for Czechoslovakia at the 1956 Summer Olympics and the 1960 Summer Olympics.

Bím died on 9 April 2012, at the age of 81.
