= Jindřich Tintěra =

Czech gymnast

- Born: 7 February 1901 Prague, Austria-Hungary
- Died: 10 July 1996 (aged 95)

Gymnastics career
- Discipline: Men's artistic gymnastics
- Country represented: Czechoslovakia

Jindřich Tintěra (7 February 1901 – 10 July 1996) was a Czech gymnast. He competed in eight events at the 1936 Summer Olympics.
