= Josef Effenberger =

Czechoslovak gymnast

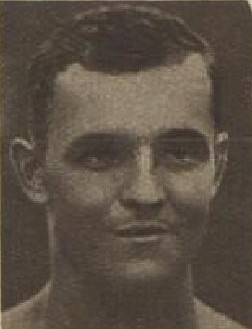

Personal information
- Born: 18 October 1901 Prague, Austria-Hungary
- Died: 11 November 1983 (aged 82) Prague, Czechoslovakia

Gymnastics career
- Discipline: Men's artistic gymnastics
- Country represented: Czechoslovakia
Medal record
Olympic Games
Representing Czechoslovakia
Silver medal – second place	1928 Amsterdam	Team
World Championships
Gold medal – first place	1926 Lyon	Team
Gold medal – first place	1930 Luxembourg	Team

Josef Effenberger (18 October 1901 – 11 November 1983) was a Czech gymnast who competed for Czechoslovakia in the 1928 Summer Olympics. Additionally, he competed at both the 1926 and 1930, helping his team to gold both times, winning silver in the all-around combined exercises in 1926.

Effenberger was born in Prague on 18 October 1901. He died there on 11 November 1983, at the age of 82.
