= Peter Šumi =

Yugoslav gymnast (1895–1981)

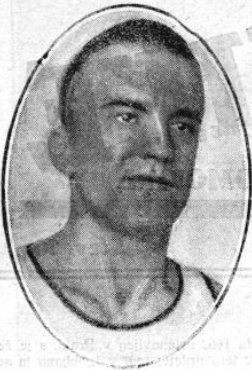

Personal information
- Born: 29 June 1895 Kranj, Austria-Hungary
- Died: 21 May 1981 (aged 85) Vienna, Austria

Gymnastics career
- Discipline: Men's artistic gymnastics
- Country represented: Yugoslavia
Medal record
Men's artistic gymnastics
Representing Kingdom of Yugoslavia
World Championships
Gold medal – first place	1922 Ljubljana	All-around
Gold medal – first place	1922 Ljubljana	Rings
Gold medal – first place	1922 Ljubljana	Horizontal bar
Gold medal – first place	1926 Lyon	All-around
Silver medal – second place	1922 Ljubljana	Team
Silver medal – second place	1922 Ljubljana	Pommel horse
Silver medal – second place	1926 Lyon	Team
Silver medal – second place	1930 Luxembourg	Pommel horse

Peter Šumi (June 29, 1895 – May 21, 1981) was a Yugoslav gymnast and the founder of the Sava Kranj factory.

Šumi was born in Kranj. He took part in three World Championships in gymnastics for Yugoslavia. At the 1922 World Championships in Ljubljana, he was part of the Yugoslav team that took silver in the team event, behind Czechoslovakia. He also took gold in the individual combined event, as well as gold in the rings, horizontal bar, and parallel bars, and silver in the pommel horse.

At the next World Championships, in Lyon, France in 1926, he again took silver in the team event, again behind Czechoslovakia. Šumi won the individual combined event for the second time, but won no apparatus medals on this occasion.

His last World Championship medal came in 1930, at the World Championships in Luxembourg, where he took silver in the pommel horse. He died in Vienna.

Šumi was the only gymnast to have taken individual overall medals in consecutive World Championships until the Chinese gymnast Yang Wei achieved it in 2006 and 2007. Additionally, Šumi is one of only two repeat male World All-Around Champions (of which there are 7) in the sport of Artistic Gymnastics, along with Yuri Korolyov, never to make an Olympic appearance as a competing athlete.
