= Josef Škvor =

Czech gymnast

- Born: 8 December 1929 (age 96) Dojetřice, Czechoslovakia

Gymnastics career
- Discipline: Men's artistic gymnastics
- Country represented: Czechoslovakia

Josef Škvor (born 8 December 1929) is a Czech former gymnast. He competed for Czechoslovakia at the 1952 Summer Olympics and the 1956 Summer Olympics.
