= Dominique Follacci =

French gymnast

- Full name: Dominique Jean Follacci
- Born: 18 May 1879 Bône, French Algeria

Gymnastics career
- Discipline: Men's artistic gymnastics
- Country represented: France
Medal record
Representing France
World Championships
Silver medal – second place	1911 Turin	Team
Silver medal – second place	1911 Turin	Rings
Silver medal – second place	1911 Turin	Parallel Bars

Dominique Jean Follacci (born 18 May 1879, date of death unknown) was a French gymnast. He competed in the men's artistic individual all-around event at the 1908 Summer Olympics.

== Life and career ==
Follaci was interested in sports from childhood. He became a director of the Languedocienne Gymnastics Society. He received several prizes while representing this organization in competitions like Dijon 1899, Paris 1900, and Nice 1901. Additionally, he was a competitor at the 1911 World Artistic Gymnastics Championships where he was a part of the silver medal winning French team and where he also won individual silver medals on the rings and parallel bars apparatuses.
