= Pietro Bianchi (gymnast) =

Italian artistic gymnast

- Born: 5 March 1888 Milan, Italy
- Died: 1 July 1965 (aged 77)

Gymnastics career
- Discipline: Men's artistic gymnastics
- Country represented: Italy
Medal record
Representing Italy
Men's Gymnastics
Gold medal – first place	1912 Stockholm	Team, european system
Gold medal – first place	1920 Antwerp	Team, european system
World Championships
Silver medal – second place	1911 Turin	Rings
Bronze medal – third place	1911 Turin	Team
Bronze medal – third place	1913 Paris	Team

Pietro Bianchi (5 March 1888 – 1 July 1965) was an Italian gymnast who competed in the 1912 Summer Olympics and in the 1920 Summer Olympics. He was born in Milan. He was part of the Italian team, which won the gold medal in the gymnastics men's team, European system event in 1912 as well as in 1920. He finished sixth in the individual all-around competition in 1912. Additionally, he was a member of the Italian gymnastics team at the world championships in both 1911 and 1913 where his team won the bronze medal both times.
