= Josef Malý =

Czech artistic gymnast

- Born: 25 March 1894 Prague, Austria-Hungary
- Died: 23 March 1943 (aged 48) Berlin, Germany

Gymnastics career
- Discipline: Men's artistic gymnastics
- Country represented: Czechoslovakia
Medal record
Representing Czechoslovakia
World Championships
Gold medal – first place	1922 Ljubljana	Team
Gold medal – first place	1922 Ljubljana	Rings

Josef Malý (25 March 1894 – 23 March 1943) was a Czech gymnast who competed for Czechoslovakia in the 1920 Summer Olympics. He was born in Prague and died in Berlin. In 1920, he was a member of the Czechoslovak gymnastic team, which finished fourth in the team event. Additionally, he competed at the 1922 World Artistic Gymnastics Championships, where he helped his team to the gold medal and also where he won an individual gold medal on rings.
