= Jules Labéeu =

Belgian gymnast (1885–1969)

- Born: 18 February 1885 Zottegem, Belgium
- Died: 15 June 1969 (aged 84) Brussels, Belgium

Gymnastics career
- Discipline: Men's artistic gymnastics
- Country represented: Belgium

Jules Labéeu (18 February 1885 – 15 June 1969) was a Belgian gymnast. He competed in the men's team all-around event at the 1920 Summer Olympics, winning the silver medal.
