= Bedřich Šupčík =

Czechoslovak gymnast

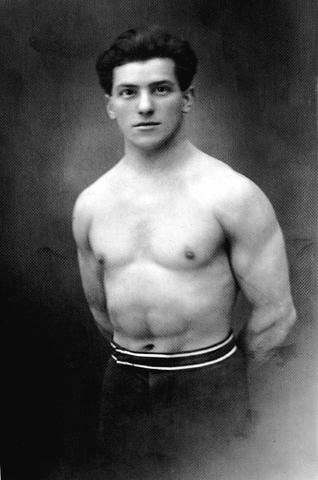

Personal information
- Born: 22 October 1898 Trumau, Lower Austria, Austria-Hungary
- Died: 11 July 1957 (aged 58) Písek, Czechoslovakia

Gymnastics career
- Discipline: Men's artistic gymnastics
- Country represented: Czechoslovakia
Medal record
Olympic Games
Gold medal – first place	1924 Paris	Rope climbing
Silver medal – second place	1928 Amsterdam	Team
Bronze medal – third place	1924 Paris	All round, individual
World Championships
Gold medal – first place	1926 Lyon	Team
Gold medal – first place	1930 Luxembourg	Team
Silver medal – second place	1930 Luxembourg	Rings
Bronze medal – third place	1926 Lyon	Rings

Bedřich Šupčík (22 October 1898 – 11 July 1957) was a Czech gymnast and Olympic champion. He competed for Czechoslovakia at the 1924 Summer Olympics in Paris, where he received a gold medal in rope climbing, and a bronze medal and in all-round individual. He received a silver medal in team combined exercises at the 1928 Summer Olympics in Amsterdam. Additionally, he competed at the 1926 and 1930 World Artistic Gymnastics Championships, helping his Czechoslovak team win gold both times, and, individually, winning bronze on rings in 1926 and silver on rings in 1930.
