= Paolo Salvi =

Italian artistic gymnast

Osvaldo Palazzi
- Born: 22 November 1891
- Died: 12 January 1945 (aged 53)

Gymnastics career
- Discipline: Men's artistic gymnastics
- Country represented: Italy
Medal record
Representing Italy
Men's Gymnastics
Gold medal – first place	1912 Stockholm	Team, european system
Gold medal – first place	1920 Antwerp	Team, european system
World Championships
Silver medal – second place	1911 Turin	Pommel Horse
Bronze medal – third place	1911 Turin	Parallel Bars
Bronze medal – third place	1911 Turin	Team
Bronze medal – third place	1913 Paris	Team

Paolo Salvi (22 November 1891 – 12 January 1945) was an Italian gymnast who competed in the 1912 Summer Olympics and in the 1920 Summer Olympics. He was part of the Italian team, which was able to win the gold medal in the gymnastics men's team, European system event in 1912 as well as in 1920. Additionally, he was part of the bronze medal winning Italian gymnastics team at both the 1911 World Artistic Gymnastics Championships and 1913 World Artistic Gymnastics Championships. At the 1911 worlds, he also won, as an individual, a silver medal on the pommel horse apparatus and a bronze medal on the parallel bars apparatus.

He was killed in the Mauthausen-Gusen concentration camp during World War II.

== See also ==
- Legends of Italian sport - Walk of Fame
