= František Pecháček =

Czechoslovak gymnast

Personal information
- Born: 15 February 1896 Záhornice, Bohemia, Austria-Hungary
- Died: 3 February 1944 (aged 47) Mauthausen-Gusen concentration camp, Nazi Germany

Gymnastics career
- Discipline: Men's artistic gymnastics
- Country represented: Czechoslovakia
Medal record
Representing Czechoslovakia
World Championships
Gold medal – first place	1922 Ljubljana	Team
Gold medal – first place	1922 Ljubljana	All-around
Gold medal – first place	1922 Lyon	Team

František Pecháček (15 February 1896 – 3 February 1944) was a Czech gymnast who competed for Czechoslovakia in the 1920 Summer Olympics. He was born in Záhornice near Městec Králové and was murdered in Mauthausen-Gusen concentration camp.

In 1920, he was a member of the Czechoslovak gymnastic team which finished fourth in the team event.

He died on 3 February 1944.
