= André Bordang =

Luxembourgish gymnast (1875–1954)

- Born: August 8, 1875
- Died: February 28, 1954 (aged 78)

Gymnastics career
- Discipline: Men's artistic gymnastics
- Country represented: Luxembourg
Medal record
Representing Luxembourg
Olympic Games
World Championships
Bronze medal – third place	1903 Antwerp	Team
Bronze medal – third place	1903 Antwerp	Parallel Bars

André Bordang (8 August 1875 – 28 February 1954) was a Luxembourgish gymnast who competed in the 1912 Summer Olympics. In 1912, he was a member of the Luxembourgish team, which finished fourth in the team, European system competition and fifth in the team, free system event. He was also a member of the Bronze medal winning Luxembourgish team at the first-ever World Artistic Gymnastics Championships where he won a bronze with his team and retrospectively placed 3rd individually on the parallel bars.
