= Bohumil Honzátko =

Czech athlete and gymnast

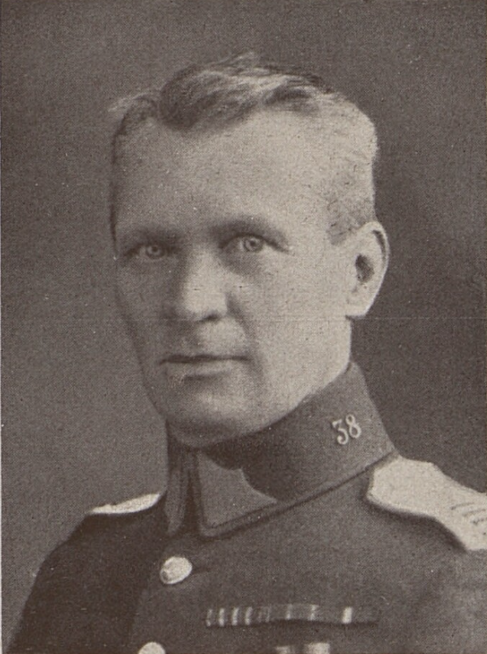

Personal information
- Alternative name: Boris Honzátko
- Born: 30 December 1875 Stará Boleslav, Austria-Hungary
- Died: 12 December 1950 (aged 74) Prague, Czechoslovakia

Gymnastics career
- Discipline: Men's artistic gymnastics
- Country represented: Bohemia

Bohumil "Boris" Honzátko (30 December 1875 – 12 December 1950) was a Czech gymnast and long-distance runner. He competed for Bohemia at the 1908 and 1912 Summer Olympics, as well as at the 1906 Intercalated Games. After World War I, he then competed for the newly-independent Czechoslovakia at the 1924 Summer Olympics.
