= Jan Sládek =

Czech gymnast

- Born: 23 February 1907 Vracov, Moravia, Austria-Hungary
- Died: 11 June 1984 (aged 77) Prague, Czechoslovakia

Gymnastics career
- Discipline: Men's artistic gymnastics
- Country represented: Czechoslovakia
Medal record
World Championships
Silver medal – second place	1934 Budapest	Team
Bronze medal – third place	1934 Budapest	Pommel horse
Bronze medal – third place	1934 Budapest	Vault
Gold medal – first place	1938 Prague	Team
Silver medal – second place	1938 Prague	All-Around

Jan Sládek (23 February 1907 – 11 June 1984) was a Czech gymnast. He competed in eight events at the 1936 Summer Olympics. Additionally, he competed at the 1934 World Artistic Gymnastics Championships, helping his Czechoslovak team to the silver and winning an individual bronze medal on the pommel horse, as well as at the 1938 World Artistic Gymnastics Championships where he helped his Czechoslovak team to gold, as well as taking an individual silver medal in the all-around combined exercises.
