= Jaroslav Kollinger =

Czech gymnast

- Born: 13 December 1905 Roudnice nad Labem, Austria-Hungary
- Died: 24 July 1949 (aged 43) Prague, Czechoslovakia

Gymnastics career
- Discipline: Men's artistic gymnastics
- Country represented: Czechoslovakia

Jaroslav Kollinger (13 December 1905 – 24 July 1949) was a Czech gymnast. He competed in eight events at the 1936 Summer Olympics.
