= 1913 World Artistic Gymnastics Championships =

Gymnastics competition

- Location: Paris, France

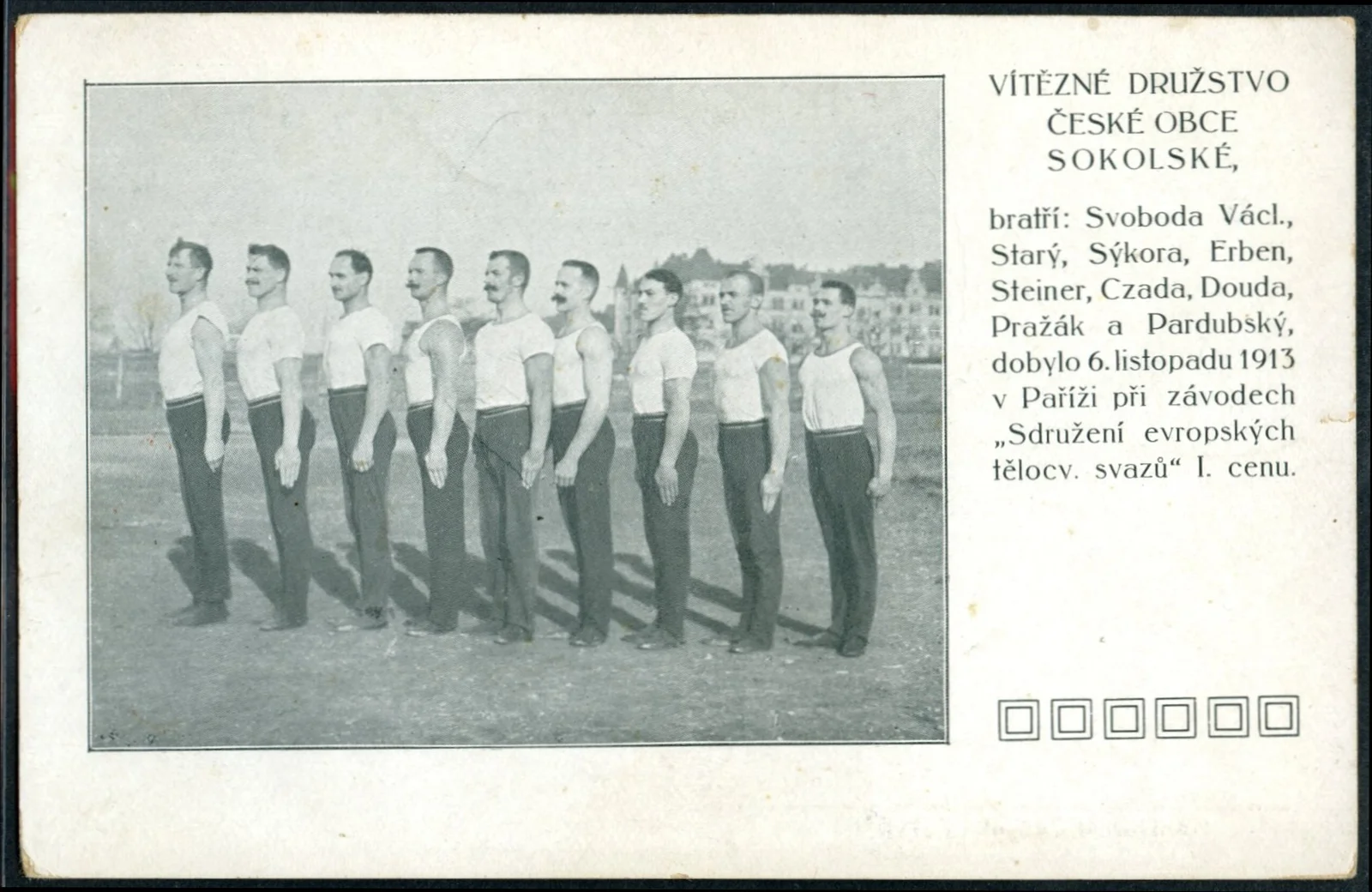
A postcard issued by "Tyrs" Magazine of the victorious Bohemian/CzechoSlovak team at these championships, with 3 extra members. Left to right: Václav Svoboda (reserve), Karel Starý, Josef Sýkora, František Erben (extra), Ferdinand Steiner, Josef Čada, Václav Douda, Robert Pražák, Václav Pardubský (reserve)

The 6th Artistic Gymnastics World Championships were held in Paris, France, on the occasion of the 40th anniversary of the "Union des Societes des Gymnastique de France", on November 16, 1913. The tournament was held at the Voltaire gymnasium on Rue Japy.

== Medal table ==
The championships were purely team events without any individual awards. Individual all-round scores were only introduced in 1922, with the first all-round individual men's champion being recognised in that year. Individual apparatus scores were introduced subsequently. As such no actual individual medals were awarded at these games, the below rankings were conferred retrospectively.

Rank	Nation	Gold	Silver	Bronze	Total
1	Italy (ITA)	5	1	2	8
2	France (FRA)	4	3	0	7
3	Czechoslovakia (TCH)	2	1	2	5
4	Belgium (BEL)	0	0	1	1
4	Luxembourg (LUX)	0	0	1	1
Totals (5 entries)		11	5	6	22

† The FIG (now World Gymnastics) in their 125-year anniversary publication, whereas pre-World War I editions of these championships are concerned, credits the teams and athletes from the Bohemian/Czech lands, then part of Austria-Hungary, as belonging to Czechoslovakia, and also credits the teams and athletes from Slovenia, then also part of Austria-Hungary, as belonging to Yugoslavia.

== Team competition ==
Rank	Nation	Gymnast	Preliminaries Events	Gymnastics Events						Athletics Events						Individual Grand Totals		Team Scores		
Rank	Nation	Gymnast	Preliminaries	Parallel bars	Horizontal bar	Pommel horse	Rings (gymnastics)	Gymnastics Events Totals	Gymnastics Events Totals Rank	Long Jump	Rope climb	Weight Lifting	100 meters	Athletics Totals	Athletics Totals Rank	Grand Totals	Grand Totals Rank	Team Exercise Grand Totals	Team Behavior	Final Grand Totals
1st place, gold medalist(s)	Czechoslovakia†	Karel Starý	28.5	18	19.25	19	17.75	74	6	10	10	10	9	39	1	141.5	2	794.75	9.75	804.50
1st place, gold medalist(s)	Czechoslovakia†	Josef Sýkora	29.5	18.25	19.5	18.25	16.25	72.25	11	9	10	9.75	5.5	34.25	4	136	3	794.75	9.75	804.50
1st place, gold medalist(s)	Czechoslovakia†	Josef Čada	26	19	20	18	14.5	71.5	13	9	10	10	6	35	3	132.5	6	794.75	9.75	804.50
1st place, gold medalist(s)	Czechoslovakia†	Ferdinand Steiner	28.5	17.25	18.75	18	16	70	17	7	10	10	5.5	32.5	7	131	9	794.75	9.75	804.50
1st place, gold medalist(s)	Czechoslovakia†	Robert Pražák	29	17.5	18.25	16.5	17.75	70	17	7	10	9	3.5	29.5	15	128.5	11	794.75	9.75	804.50
1st place, gold medalist(s)	Czechoslovakia†	Václav Douda	28.5	18.75	19.25	18.5	17.55	74	6	6.25	3	9.5	3.5	22.25	25	124.75	14	794.75	9.75	804.50
1st place, gold medalist(s)	Czechoslovakia†	Totals:	170	108.75	115	108.75	99.75	-	-	48.25	53	58.25	33	-	-	794.75	-	794.75	9.75	804.50
2nd place, silver medalist(s)	France	Marco Torrès	29.75	19.25	20	19.25	19.75	78.25	1	7	10	10	7	34	5	142	1	768.25	9.5	777.75
2nd place, silver medalist(s)	France	?? Marquelet	29.75	17.75	17	18.25	17.75	70.75	15	9	10	8.5	6	33.5	6	131.25	8	768.25	9.5	777.75
2nd place, silver medalist(s)	France	Laurent Grech	26.5	18.5	18	18.25	19.75	74.5	5	6.25	8	10	5.5	29.75	14	130.75	10	768.25	9.5	777.75
2nd place, silver medalist(s)	France	?? Ben-Sadoun	25.25	17	18.25	15.5	16.25	67	26	10	4	10	7	31	10	123.25	16	768.25	9.5	777.75
2nd place, silver medalist(s)	France	?? Aubry	28	18.75	15.25	19.25	16.25	69.5	21	6.25	3.5	10	3.5	23.25	21	120.75	19	768.25	9.5	777.75
2nd place, silver medalist(s)	France	Louis Ségura	25	18.5	18.5	18.25	18	73.25	9	3.5	5.5	9.5	3.5	22	26	120.25	20	768.25	9.5	777.75
2nd place, silver medalist(s)	France	Totals:	161.50	109.75	107	108.75	107.75	-	-	42	41	58	32.5	-	-	768.25	-	768.25	9.5	777.75
3rd place, bronze medalist(s)	Italy	Giorgio Zampori	30	20	16.5	19.75	19.75	76	2	9	6.5	10	4	29.5	15	135.5	4	762.75	9.25	772.25
3rd place, bronze medalist(s)	Italy	Guido Romano	27.75	19.25	18.25	17	19.5	74	6	9	5.5	10	5.5	30	12	131.75	7	762.75	9.25	772.25
3rd place, bronze medalist(s)	Italy	Pietro Bianchi (gymnast)	23	18.75	19	18.25	19.5	75.5	3	8	6.5	10	5.5	30	12	128.5	11	762.75	9.25	772.25
3rd place, bronze medalist(s)	Italy	Osvaldo Palazzi	21	18.5	19.5	19.25	18.25	75.5	3	10	6.5	10	5	31.5	9	128	13	762.75	9.25	772.25
3rd place, bronze medalist(s)	Italy	Guido Boni	25.5	20	6.5	18.5	19.75	64.75	31	9	6.5	10	7	32.5	7	122.75	17	762.75	9.25	772.25
3rd place, bronze medalist(s)	Italy	Paolo Salvi	24.5	19.25	18	17.5	17.5	72.25	11	5.5	0	10	4	19.5	30	116.25	26	762.75	9.25	772.25
3rd place, bronze medalist(s)	Italy	Totals:	151.75	115.75	97.75	110.25	114.252	-	-	50.50	31.50	60	31	-	-	762.75	-	762.75	9.25	772.25
4	Belgium	Julianus Wagemans	28.75	16	19	17.75	15.25	68	25	7	6.5	10	4	27.5	15	124.25	15	714	9.25	723.25
4	Belgium	?? Patteson	25.25	17	18.75	17.75	16	69.5	21	2	10	10	3.5	25.5	18	120.25	20	714	9.25	723.25
4	Belgium	?? Kempeneers	25.5	16.5	19.5	15.5	18.25	69.75	19	4.75	5.5	9.5	4.5	24.25	20	119.5	22	714	9.25	723.25
4	Belgium	?? Dumont	27	16.5	17.5	17.75	18	69.75	19	6.25	2.5	10	4	22.75	24	119.5	23	714	9.25	723.25
4	Belgium	?? Labeen	27	17	18	18.5	17.5	71	14	3.5	2	10	2	17.5	32	115.5	28	714	9.25	723.25
4	Belgium	?? De Mol	25.25	17.25	17.5	14	18	66.75	27	2	8	10	3	23	22	115	29	714	9.25	723.25
4	Belgium	Totals:	158.75	100.25	110.25	101.25	103	-	-	25.5	34.5	59.5	21	-	-	714	-	714	9.25	723.25
5	Yugoslavia†	Stane Vidmar	27.25	17	18.25	19	16.5	70.75	15	10	10	10	5.5	35.5	2	133.5	5	696.74	9.75	706.5
5	Yugoslavia†	?? Jerin	28.25	15	18	10	15.25	58.25	34	7	10	9.5	4	30.5	11	117	25	696.74	9.75	706.5
5	Yugoslavia†	Fran Míklavc	29	16.25	18.5	15	14.5	64.25	33	3.5	6.5	10	1.5	21.5	27	114.75	30	696.74	9.75	706.5
5	Yugoslavia†	?? Rabic	30	16.75	18.25	13	16.25	64.26	32	4	5.5	10	1	20.5	28	114.76	30	696.74	9.75	706.5
5	Yugoslavia†	?? Jezeršek	27	14.5	17.75	15.5	17.75	65.5	30	4.75	2	10	0.5	17.25	33	109.75	33	696.74	9.75	706.5
5	Yugoslavia†	?? Sever	27.5	16.5	17.25	17.5	14.75	66	29	2	2.25	9	0	13.25	35	106.75	34	696.74	9.75	706.5
5	Yugoslavia†	Totals:	169	96	108	90	95	-	-	31.25	30.5	58.5	12.5	-	-	696.75	-	696.74	9.75	706.5
6	Luxembourg	Pierre Hentges	26	19.5	18	16.25	19.25	73	10	5.5	4	10	3.5	23	22	122	18	659.25	9	668.25
6	Luxembourg	Emile Lanners	25.5	17.5	16.75	16	19.25	69.5	21	3.5	5.5	10	1.5	20.5	28	119.5	24	659.25	9	668.25
6	Luxembourg	Jean-Pierre Thommes	24.25	18.5	17	13.5	17.5	66.5	28	8	1.5	10	5.5	25	19	115.75	27	659.25	9	668.25
6	Luxembourg	Jean-Baptiste Horn	26	18.75	16.25	16	18	69	24	4	1	10	3.5	18.5	31	113.5	32	659.25	9	668.25
6	Luxembourg	Nicolas Adam	24	18	13.75	13.5	12.5	57.75	35	2	0.5	9.75	0.5	12.75	36	94.5	35	659.25	9	668.25
6	Luxembourg	André Bordang	21.75	17	14	9	15.5	55.5	36	4.75	0	10	2	16.75	34	94	36	659.25	9	668.25
6	Luxembourg	Totals:	151.50	109.25	95.75	84.25	102	-	-	27.75	12.5	59.75	16.5	-	-	659.25	-	659.25	9	668.25

=== Individual all-around ===
Rank	Nationality	Athlete	Total
1	France	Marco Torrès	142,000
2	Czechoslovakia	Karel Stary	141,500
3	Czechoslovakia	Josef Sykora	136,500

=== Pommel horse ===
Rank	Nationality	Athlete	Total
1	Italy	Giorgio Zampori	19,750
2	France	Marco Torrès	19,250
2	France	N. Aubry	19,250
2	Italy	Osvaldo Palazzi	19,250

=== Rings ===
Rank	Nationality	Athlete	Total
1	France	Laurent Grech	19,750
1	France	Marco Torrès	19,750
1	Italy	Giorgio Zampori	19,750
1	Italy	Guido Boni	19,750

=== Parallel bars ===
Rank	Nationality	Athlete	Total
1	Italy	Giorgio Zampori	20,000
1	Italy	Guido Boni	20,000
3	Luxembourg	Pierre Hentges	19,500

=== Horizontal bar ===
Rank	Nationality	Athlete	Total
1	France	Marco Torrès	20,000
1	Czechoslovakia	Josef Cada	20,000
3	Belgium	A. Demol	19,500
3	Italy	Osvaldo Palazzi	19,500
3	Czechoslovakia	Josef Sykora	19,500
