= Guido Boni =

Italian gymnast

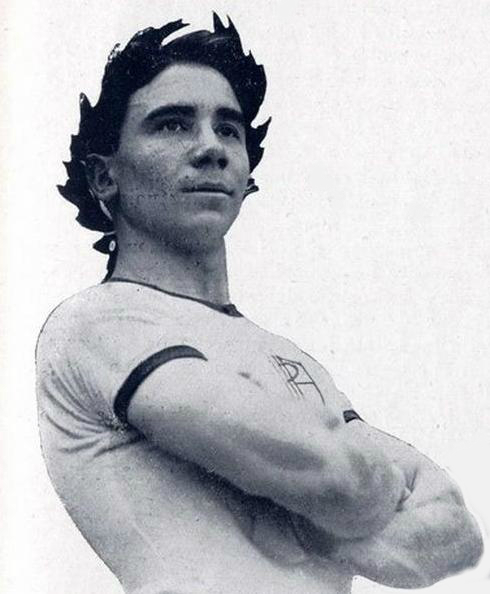
- Guido Boni

Gymnastics career
- Discipline: Men's artistic gymnastics
- Country represented: Italy
Medal record
Representing Italy
Olympic Games
Gold medal – first place	1912 Stockholm	Team, european system
World Championships
Gold medal – first place	1913 Paris	Rings
Gold medal – first place	1913 Paris	Parallel bars
Bronze medal – third place	1913 Paris	Team

Guido Boni (7 February 1892 – 15 December 1956) was an Italian gymnast who competed in the 1912 Summer Olympics. He was part of the Italian team, which was able to win the gold medal in the gymnastics men's team, European system event in 1912. He finished fourth in the individual all-around competition. Additionally, he competed at the 1913 World Artistic Gymnastics Championships where he helped his team to the bronze medal and additionally won individual gold medals on both the rings and parallel bars apparatuses.
