= Guido Romano =

Italian artistic gymnast

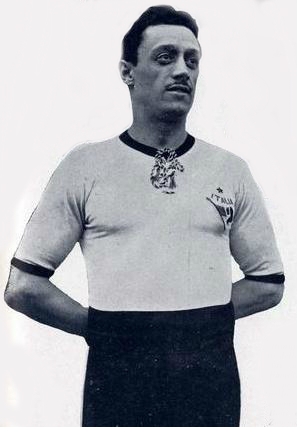

Personal information
- Full name: Guido Giuseppe Romano
- Born: 31 January 1888 Elbeuf, France
- Died: 18 June 1916 (aged 28) Asiago, Italy

Gymnastics career
- Discipline: Men's artistic gymnastics
- Country represented: Italy
Medal record
Representing Italy
Olympic Games
Gold medal – first place	1912 Stockholm	Team, european system
World Championships
Gold medal – first place	1909 Luxembourg	Rings
Bronze medal – third place	1909 Luxembourg	Team
Bronze medal – third place	1911 Turin	Horizontal Bar

Guido Giuseppe Romano (31 January 1888 – 18 June 1916) was an Italian gymnast who competed in the 1908 Summer Olympics and in the 1912 Summer Olympics. He was born in Modena and died during World War I when killed at the Battle of Asiago as an infantryman in the Italian army. In 1908, he competed in the individual all-around and finished 19th. He was also part of the Italian team, which was able to win the gold medal in the gymnastics men's team European system event in 1912. Additionally, he competed at the 1909 World Artistic Gymnastics Championships where he was a part of the bronze medal winning Italian team, and where he also, as an individual, was retrospectively placed first on the rings (no individual medals were awarded in these tournaments until 1922).
