= Giorgio Zampori =

Italian artistic gymnast

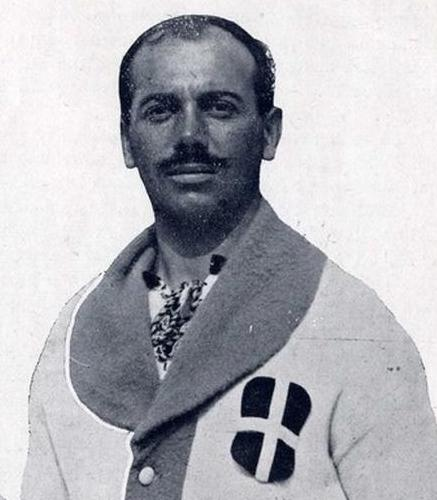

Personal information
- Born: 4 June 1887 Milan, Kingdom of Italy
- Died: 6 December 1965 (aged 78) Brescia, Italy

Gymnastics career
- Discipline: Men's artistic gymnastics
- Country represented: Italy
Medal record
Olympic Games
Gold medal – first place	1912 Stockholm	Team european s.
Gold medal – first place	1920 Antwerp	Individual, all-around
Gold medal – first place	1920 Antwerp	Team european s.
Gold medal – first place	1924 Paris	Team competition
Bronze medal – third place	1924 Paris	Parallel bars
World Championships
Gold medal – first place	1911 Turin	Parallel bars
Gold medal – first place	1913 Paris	Parallel bars
Gold medal – first place	1913 Paris	Pommel horse
Gold medal – first place	1913 Paris	Rings
Silver medal – second place	1911 Turin	Pommel horse
Bronze medal – third place	1909 Luxembourg	Rings
Bronze medal – third place	1909 Luxembourg	Team
Bronze medal – third place	1911 Turin	Team
Bronze medal – third place	1913 Paris	Team

Giorgio Zampori (4 June 1887 – 6 December 1965) was an Italian gymnast who competed in the Summer Olympic Games in 1912, 1920 and 1924.

== Biography ==
He was part of the Italian team that won three consecutive gold medals in the men's gymnastics team event. He also won the gold medal in the Individual all-round in 1920.

== Achievements ==
Year	Competition	Venue	Position	Event
1909	World Championships	Luxembourg	3rd	Rings
1909	World Championships	Luxembourg	3rd	Team All-round
1911	World Championships	(Italy) Turin	1st	Parallel bars
1911	World Championships	(Italy) Turin	2nd	Pommel horse
1913	World Championships	(France) Paris	1st	Parallel bars
1913	World Championships	(France) Paris	1st	Pommel horse
1913	World Championships	(France) Paris	1st	Rings
1913	World Championships	(France) Paris	3rd	Team All-round

== See also ==
- Legends of Italian sport - Walk of Fame
- Italian men gold medalist at the Olympics and World Championships
