= Marco Torrès =

French gymnast (1888–1963)

- Torrès c. 1910

Personal information
- Full name: Marcos Torrès
- Born: 22 January 1888 Sidi Bel Abbès, French Algeria
- Died: 15 January 1963 (aged 74)

Gymnastics career
- Discipline: Men's artistic gymnastics
- Country represented: France
Medal record
Olympic Games
Silver medal – second place	1920 Antwerp	Men's all-around
Bronze medal – third place	1920 Antwerp	Team, European system
World Championships
Gold medal – first place	1909 Luxembourg	Team
Gold medal – first place	1909 Luxembourg	All-around
Gold medal – first place	1909 Luxembourg	Rings
Gold medal – first place	1913 Paris	All-Around
Gold medal – first place	1913 Paris	Rings
Gold medal – first place	1913 Paris	Horizontal bar
Silver medal – second place	1909 Luxembourg	Parallel Bars
Silver medal – second place	1911 Turin	Horizontal Bar
Silver medal – second place	1913 Paris	Team
Silver medal – second place	1913 Paris	Pommel Horse
Bronze medal – third place	1922 Ljubljana	Team

Marcos "Marco" Torrès (22 January 1888 – 15 January 1963), born in Sidi Bel Abbès, French Algeria, was a French gymnast who competed in two Summer Olympic Games - the 1912 Summer Olympics, where he finished seventh in the individual all-around competition and in the 1920 Summer Olympics, where he placed 2nd in the all-around and helped his team to a bronze medal.

He also had tremendous success at the World Artistic Gymnastics Championships, where he led his French team to victory in 1909. Marco Torres is officially recognized by both the FIG (the official governing body of the sport of Artistic Gymnastics) and USAG (the official governing body of the sport of Artistic gymnastics within the USA) as both the 1909 and 1913 World All-Around Champion in the sport of Artistic gymnastics.

Torres was one of the few pre-World War I gymnasts who continued to compete (successfully) after the war.
