= Karel Starý =

Czech gymnast

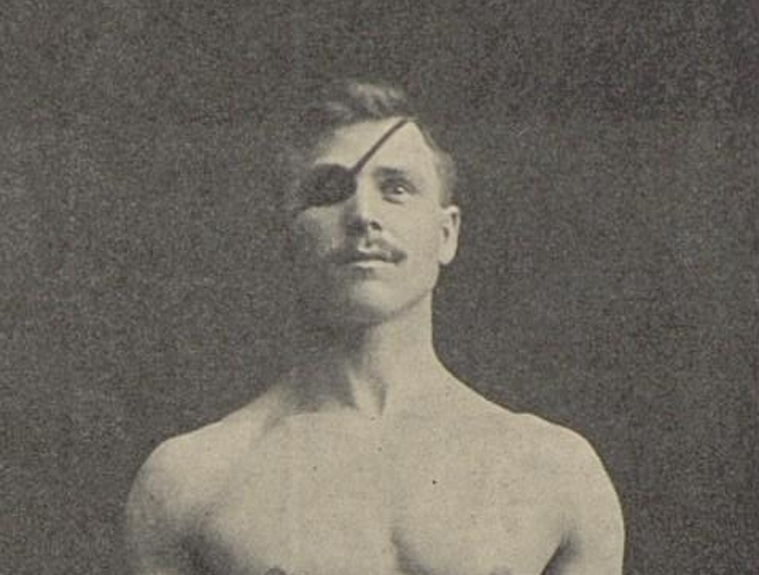
- Karel Starý, from the 1912 Prague Sokol Slet commemorative publication

Personal information
- Born: 10 May 1885

Gymnastics career
- Discipline: Men's artistic gymnastics
- Country represented: Bohemia
Medal record
Representing Bohemia
World Championships
Gold medal – first place	1907 Prague	Team
Gold medal – first place	1911 Turin	Team
Gold medal – first place	1913 Paris	Team
Silver medal – second place	1909 Luxembourg	Team
Silver medal – second place	1913 Paris	All-around
Bronze medal – third place	1911 Turin	All-around

Karel Starý (10 May 1885 – ?) was a Czech gymnast who competed in four World Championships. A mainstay of the Bohemian team through all of their appearances at every World Championship they attended prior to World War I, he helped his team to reach three out of four World Championship Team Titles (1907, 1911, 1913), and to Silver the other (1909), of the four times. He stamped himself as one of their best and one of the best in the world as during his final two appearances, he is credited by World Gymnastics as the Bronze Medalist in the All-Around at the 1911 World Championships and the Silver Medalist in the All-Around at the 1913 World Championships. Contemporaneous sources noted him, individually, for his high individual placements at those contests in 1911 and 1913. Starý was also the victorious champion, from among 232 contestants, of a combined six-event athletics competition at the 1912 Prague Sokol Slet. After Starý's competitive career was over, he was a very reputable trainer of his fellow Czechoslovak Sokol gymnasts.
