= Ferdinand Steiner =

Czech gymnast

Personal information
- Born: 25 May 1884 Tovačov, Austria-Hungary
- Died: 19 August 1968 (aged 84)

Gymnastics career
- Discipline: Men's artistic gymnastics
- Country represented: Bohemia
Medal record
Representing Bohemia
World Championships
Gold medal – first place	1911 Turin	Team
Gold medal – first place	1911 Turin	All-Around
Gold medal – first place	1911 Turin	Rings
Gold medal – first place	1913 Paris	Team
Silver medal – second place	1909 Luxembourg	Team
Bronze medal – third place	1911 Turin	Parallel Bars

Ferdinand Steiner (23 May 1884 – 19 August 1968) was a Czech artistic gymnast. He represented Bohemia and from 1914 Czechoslovakia.

== Early life ==
Steiner was born on 23 May 1884 in Tovačov.

== Gymnastics career ==
Steiner took part in the World Gymnastics Championships in 1909, 1911 and 1913, helping his team to the gold medal at two of those games and silver at the other. Ferdinand Steiner is officially recognized by both the FIG (the official governing body of the sport of Artistic Gymnastics) and USAG (the official governing body of the sport of Artistic gymnastics within the USA) as the 1911 World All-Around Champion in the sport of Artistic gymnastics.

Steiner introduced an element, the inverted cross, a move that is still valued as a "C"-difficulty element in the current Code of Points, if not much higher, depending upon the movement from which it is entered.

Since medal winners who represented Austria-Hungary came from Bohemia, these medals were later transferred to Czechoslovakia by the FIG.

== Post-gymnastics career and death ==
After his competitive career ended, Steiner worked as a trainer for Czechoslovak Sokol gymnasts. He died on 19 August 1968.
