= 1911 World Artistic Gymnastics Championships =

Gymnastics competition

- Location: Turin, Kingdom of Italy

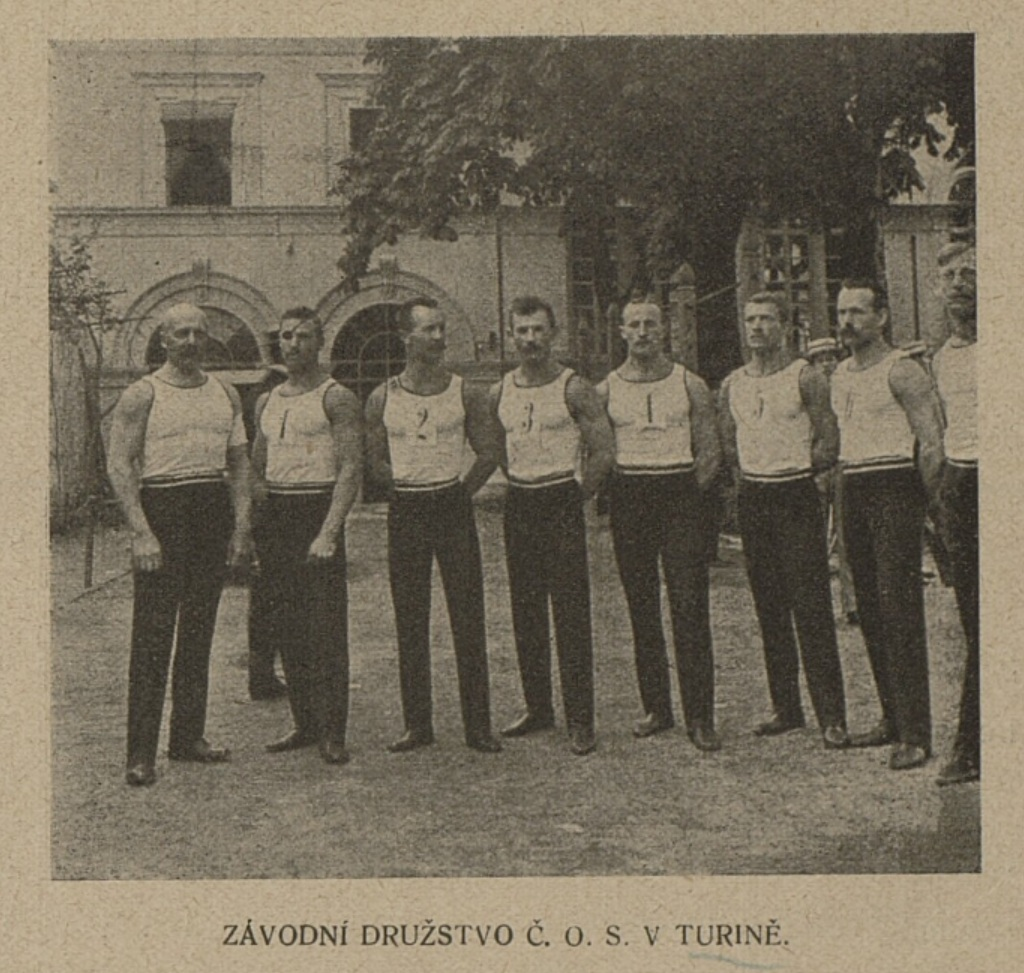
The victorious Bohemian team at these championships. From left to right: coach Jindřich Vaníček, Karel Starý, František Erben, Ferdinand Steiner, Svatopluk Svoboda, Karel Pitl, Josef Čada

The Turin International Gymnastics Tournament, subsequently regarded as the 5th Artistic Gymnastics World Championships, was held in Turin, Italy, in conjunction with the 8th Italian Federal Festival of Gymnastics, on 13 May 1911.

The countries whose teams were officially scored at the tournament were Italy, France, Belgium, Slovenia, Croatia, Luxembourg and Bohemia (i.e., the Czech Sokol team). Romania sent a team of gymnasts to the event, but they took part in only some of the exercises, and were not scored for all events.

The championships were purely a team event without any individual awards. Individual all-round scores were only introduced in 1922, with the first all-round individual men's champion being recognised in that year. Individual apparatus scores were introduced subsequently. As such no actual individual medals were awarded at these games, the below rankings were conferred retrospectively. Similarly, Czechoslovakia did not exist as an independent country at the time, instead Czech competitors competed under the flag of Bohemia.

Conversely, contemporaneous, detailed coverage – beyond merely team totals – of select World Championships prior to World War I exists both in the pages of “Slovenski Sokol” magazine (via the Digital Library of Slovenia) and in reproductions of apparently original and contemporaneous Czech source materials (via Gymnastics-History.com) for both the 3rd (1907) and 6th (1913) editions of the World Championships. In the Czech versions of those sources, reproduced by Gymnastics-History.com, both individual all-around scores and apparatus scores are presented for every competitor, and in the Slovenian versions of those sources, individual all-around scores and rankings are reproduced for the top 14 and very last-place competitor for the 1907 Worlds and for every competitor at the 1913 Worlds. Additionally, all of the data that is presented in each of those sources completely matches the data that both the FIG and USAG (the official governing body of the sport of Artistic gymnastics within the USA) present in their respective treatments on the results of these pre-WWI World Championships, with the sole two exceptions of the horizontal bar placing of French Gymnast Francois Vidal and the parallel bars placement of Belgian gymnast Paul Mangin, both at the 1907 World Championships. (In any event, all of these data sources – the Slovenian records, the Gymnastics-History.com's reproduced Czech records, the FIG's records, and the USAG's records - have continually failed to recognize the apparent original human error with respect to the discrepancy between Vidal's and Mangin's scores and rankings. In light of that, all of these data sources remain completely consistent, in terms of the data that they do present, with respect to the results of the pre-WWI editions of these World Championships.)

An article published in the 10 June 2024 issue of The International Journal of the History of Sport (a peer-reviewed journal) claimed that the BFEG’s (the FIG’s predecessor) archives from before 1950 appear to have been lost. However a brief biographical treatment containing a photograph of multiple medals belonging to 1911 World All-Around Champion Ferdinand Steiner on the website of an alma mater of his, the Gymnázium Jiřího Wolkera, shows multiple medals with the words "Concorso Ginnastico Internazionale 1911 Torino" embossed onto them. This brief biographical treatment was published at least as far back as 14 January 2017 on the official Facebook website of his alma mater in a photograph album, begun on 29 November 2016, containing other such brief biographical treatments of its notable alumni. That pictoral presentation of Steiner’s medals helps suggest that individual medals were awarded for those 1911 World Championships as they were from the same locale and year as the 1911 Worlds, and with the original title of the competition being printed on those medals, this further helps suggest that these individual medals were awarded contemporaneously.

== Medal table ==
Rank	Nation	Gold	Silver	Bronze	Total
1	Czechoslovakia (TCH)	4	1	4	9
2	Italy (ITA)	2	3	3	8
3	France (FRA)	0	5	3	8
4	Yugoslavia (YUG)	0	0	1	1
Totals (4 entries)		6	9	11	26

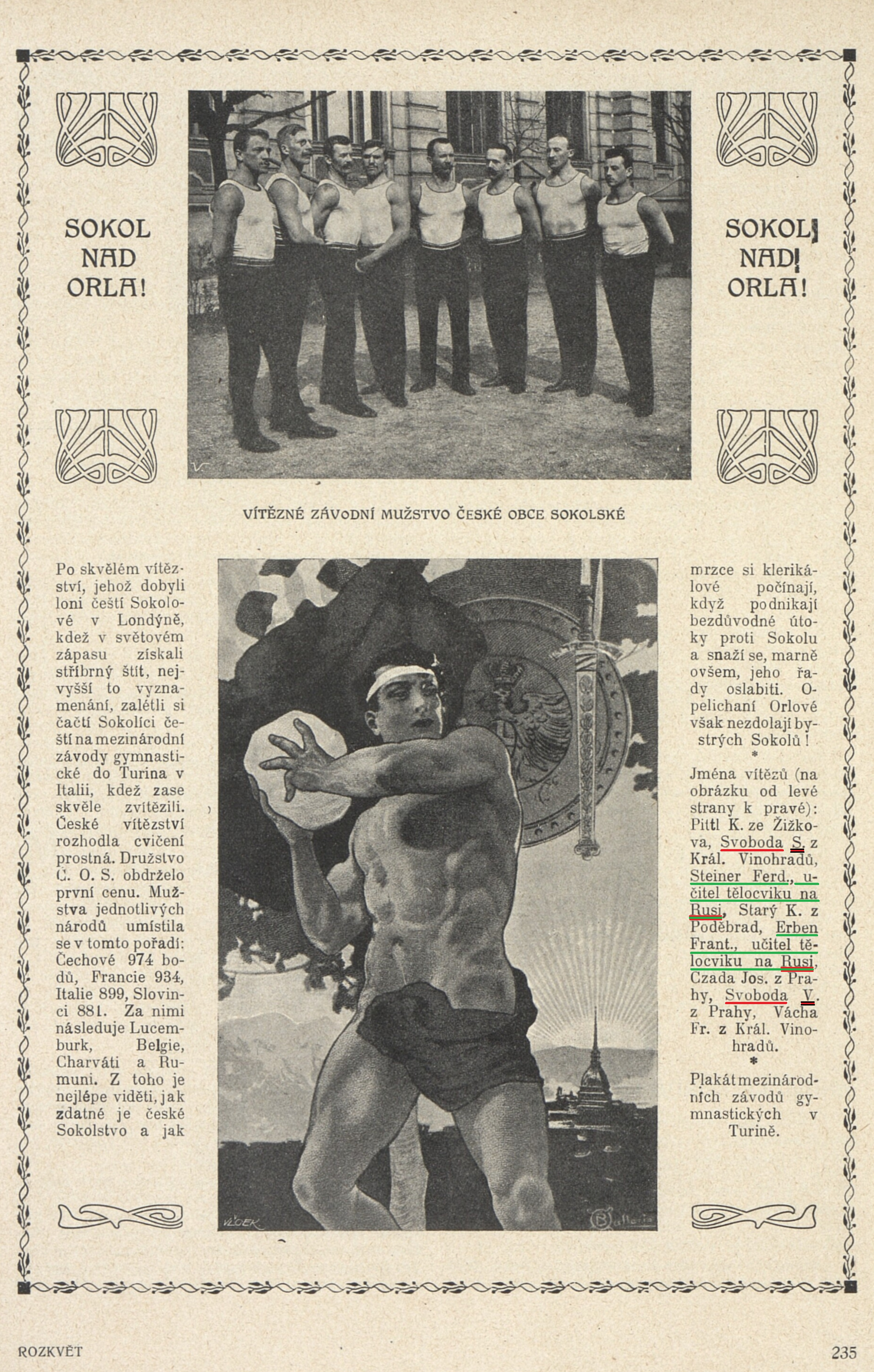
A page from the Rozkvět magazine with a photograph of the victorious Bohemian team and a promotional painting for the 1911 World Artistic Gymnastics Championships

Notes

^{1} The FIG (now World Gymnastics) in their 125-year anniversary publication, whereas pre-World War I editions of these championships are concerned, credits the teams and athletes from the Bohemian/Czech lands, then part of Austria-Hungary, as belonging to Czechoslovakia, and also credits the teams and athletes from Slovenia, then also part of Austria-Hungary, as belonging to Yugoslavia.
^{2} Some sources erroneously claim that Jules Labéeu represented Belgium, while, in fact, he represented France.
^{3} The bronze medal earned by Stane Vidmar, originally from Slovenia in Austria-Hungary, is officially credited by the International Gymnastics Federation as a medal for Yugoslavia (YUG), even though the nation did not exist at the time.

== Medal summary ==
Event	Gold	Silver	Bronze
Team all-around	Czechoslovakia; Josef Čada; František Erben; Karel Pitl; Karel Starý; Ferdinand Steiner; Svatopluk Svoboda	France; Antoine Costa; Marco Torrès; Jules Labéeu; M. Maucerier; Jules Lecoutre; Dominique Follacci	Italy; Osvaldo Palazzi; Giorgio Zampori; Paolo Salvi; Pietro Bianchi; Guido Romano; Francesco Loi
Individual all-around	Ferdinand Steiner (TCH)	Josef Čada (TCH)	Karel Starý (TCH) Svatopluk Svoboda (TCH)
Pommel horse	Osvaldo Palazzi (ITA)	Giorgio Zampori (ITA) Paolo Salvi (ITA)	—N/a
Rings	Ferdinand Steiner (TCH)	Antoine Costa (FRA) Dominique Follacci (FRA) Pietro Bianchi (ITA)	—N/a
Parallel bars	Giorgio Zampori (ITA)	Dominique Follacci (FRA)	Jules Labéeu (FRA) Antoine Costa (FRA) Jules Lecoutre (FRA) Paolo Salvi (ITA) Ferdinand Steiner (TCH) Stane Vidmar (YUG)
Horizontal bar	Josef Čada (TCH)	Marco Torrès (FRA)	Guido Romano (ITA) Svatopluk Svoboda (TCH)

== Results ==
=== Men's team all-around ===
Rank	Team	Score
1.	Czechoslovakia	974.69
2.	France	934.41
3.	Italy	899.86
4.	Slovenia	881.56
5.	Luxembourg	830.22
6.	Belgium	737.21
7.	Croatia	687.99
8.	Romania	230.49

The team totals were out of a maximum of 1126 points. The 1 September 1911 issue of the magazine Sokolské besedy reported slightly different team totals for some of these teams, however the ordering was exactly the same.

=== Men's individual all-around ===
Rank	Team	Name	Score
1.	Czechoslovakia	Ferdinand Steiner	168.25
2.	Czechoslovakia	Josef Čada	167.62
3.	Czechoslovakia	Karel Starý	167
3.	Czechoslovakia	Svatopluk Svoboda	167

This source for the scores for the individual all-around also states that the best French was 4th, the best Vlach (Romanian) was 5th, the best Slovenian was 7th and the best Luxembourger was 15th; however, seeing that this reporting apparently fails to recognize the tie for third (and might also have failed to recognized other ties), each of those placements for the unnamed individuals from those various nations should probably be moved down by at least one placement each. This source also reports Erben and Pitl as having placed 11th and 22nd.
