= Hvozd =

Hvozd may refer to places in the Czech Republic:

- Hvozd (Plzeň-North District), a municipality and village in the Plzeň Region
- Hvozd (Prostějov District), a municipality and village in the Olomouc Region
- Hvozd (Rakovník District), a municipality and village in the Central Bohemian Region

== See also ==
- Hvozdec (disambiguation)
