= List of UFO sightings in the Czech Republic =

This is a list of alleged sightings of unidentified flying objects or UFOs in the Czech Republic.

== 1976, Radkov ==
In 1976, a family saw a triangular UFO similar to a boomerang while sitting at a campfire behind their cottage in Radkov. Two years later, a similar object was unsuccessfully chased by a military aircraft from Žatec above Western Bohemia. In 1992, anomalous phenomena resembling the earlier sightings were observed in Cheb, near Prague, and near Dvůr Králové.

== 1987, Vranov ==
The Vranov UFO incident is considered the most famous and arguably the most serious UFO incident over Czech territory. This encounter took place on 12 July 1987 in Vranov nad Dyjí above the Vranov Reservoir, which was bustling with vacationers at the time. The observation began at noon. The crew of a military helicopter was ordered to pursue an unknown object. The weather on the day of the event was typical for the season and climate, with cumulus clouds above 1.5 km (0.93 mi). The "target" was first located in Austria, close to the border. At first, the pilots thought the guidance station was vectoring them towards a cloud. After a while, a black object in the shape of a cigar flew over them. They received an instruction from the ground to shoot down the object, but according to the pilots' description, the machine was exhibiting unusual behavior. Whenever the object was aimed in the crosshairs, it immediately changed direction. Moreover, shooting was also not possible due to the fact that they were located above a populated tourist spot. After two minutes of visual contact, the object disappeared behind a cloud. The pilots flew on, and First Lieutenant Jaroslav Špaček claims: "Then probably the worst situation occurred during the entire flight." The object was flying directly towards their helicopter and they had to dodge it with great difficulty. At allegedly supersonic speed, the object then moved over Brno, Jaslovské Bohunice, and towards Bratislava, where after some time it was no longer visible on the radar.

== 1991, Miličín ==
On 12 July 1991, a glowing round object was seen near Miličín, which raised alarm among the local populace. A sphere appeared randomly, silently followed people, and caused widespread fear. It was allegedly seen by hundreds of witnesses, though only a few of them were willing to report what they had seen. A local pastor had reportedly speculated that this was a divine miracle and advised locals that they should remain quiet about the encounters. Several eyewitnesses testified that they had seen the outlines of figures in the sphere. In some cases, the figures even allegedly disembarked and were walking on the roof of an empty cottage, apparently performing repairs on something. They reportedly left behind large four-fingered footprints in the mud. One man approached the sphere, despite the protestations of his neighbors, only to return later explaining his ostensible inability to deviate from his previous course. Another person reported missing time. One witness testified that figures came to her house and only left after she screamed, cried, and prayed loudly.

== 1992, Tři Sekery ==
On 5 May 1992, military radar indicated that an object was approaching the Czechoslovak border from Germany. It crossed the border near Tři Sekery, and was heading in the direction of the village of Hvozd. Several fighter jets and helicopters were sent to intercept the object. Although the anomaly was visible on radar and was also witnessed by a number of observers from the ground, pilots were unable to locate it, despite good weather. According to the radar data, the unknown object continued towards Chomutov and ultimately disappeared near Jirkov.

== 1993, Borová ==
On 21 August 1993, Mr. Š was walking his dog when he encountered an object similar to a flatfish without a tail. It was described as being about 70 cm (28 in) in length and 40–50 cm (16–20 in) in height. The strange object was hovering about 30 or 40 cm (12 or 16 in) above the road and was not moving. Then it began to move without producing any sound. The following day, sightings of UFOs of various shapes and sizes sprang up throughout the Czech Republic, which varied from cigar-shaped craft to glowing triangles.

== 2009 ==
During late May 2009, there were various reports of eyewitnesses observing flying objects throughout the Czech Republic.

- On 23 May 2009 at 21:00, a group of 4 people saw four orange lights flying at roughly equal intervals near Klínovec. One of the witnesses tried to take a photo of these objects until they disappeared. Similar objects were seen at 22:00 above Chrást near Plzeň.
- On 24 May 2009 at 22:30, witnesses in Říčany saw three glowing spheres flying in the sky.
- On 31 May 2009, Deník published an online article recounting an anonymous university professor's sighting six days earlier, wherein flying objects were witnessed above Brno highway. They were discs reminiscent of a vehicle's high beams.

== See also ==
- List of reported UFO sightings
