= František Erben =

Czech gymnast (1874–1942)

- Erben in 1907

Personal information
- Born: 27 November 1874 Žižkov, Bohemia, Austria-Hungary
- Died: 9 June 1942 (aged 67) Prague, Protectorate of Bohemia and Moravia

Gymnastics career
- Discipline: Men's artistic gymnastics
- Country represented: Bohemia
- Club: Žižkov Sokol
Medal record
Representing Bohemia
World Artistic Gymnastics Championships
Gold medal – first place	1907 Prague	High Bar
Gold medal – first place	1907 Prague	Pommel Horse
Gold medal – first place	1907 Prague	Team
Gold medal – first place	1911 Turin	Team
Silver medal – second place	1909 Luxembourg	Team
Silver medal – second place	1909 Luxembourg	High Bar
Bronze medal – third place	1907 Prague	All-Around
Bronze medal – third place	1907 Prague	Parallel Bars
Bronze medal – third place	1909 Luxembourg	Rings

František Erben (27 November 1874 – 9 June 1942) was a Czech gymnast, trainer, and educator. Erben made his international competitive debut for Bohemia at the 1900 Paris Summer Olympics, where he finished in 32nd place.

== Gymnastics career ==
Erben was born on 27 November 1874 in Žižkov, (Note: On page 133 of the official report for the 1900 Paris Olympics, Erben was apparently erroneously listed as being from "Zirkow", rather than Žižkov. (As competitors in this event were identified in the Official Olympic Report by surname only, a book published in 1998 further detailing the results of all competitors at these 1900 Olympics helps confirm, on page 262 of that book, that this was, indeed, František Erben of Bohemia.) Zirkow is a municipality on the island of Rügen, part of the northeasternmost German state of Mecklenburg-Vorpommern.) Bohemia, Austria-Hungary (now a district of Prague, Czech Republic). Erben was the 4th (1901) Prague Sokol Slet All-Around Champion. He took part in the third-ever World Championships in 1907, where the Bohemian team made its auspicious debut and started their several-decades-long tradition of great success at World and Olympic competition in the sport of artistic gymnastics. He took bronze in the overall competition, behind his compatriot Josef Čada and Frenchman Jules Rolland. Bohemia also took gold in the team competition, and Erben took gold in both the horizontal bar and pommel horse and bronze in the parallel bars. At the next World Championships, in 1909, the Bohemian team won silver, behind France. At the next World Championships, Erben won silver on the horizontal bar and bronze on the rings.

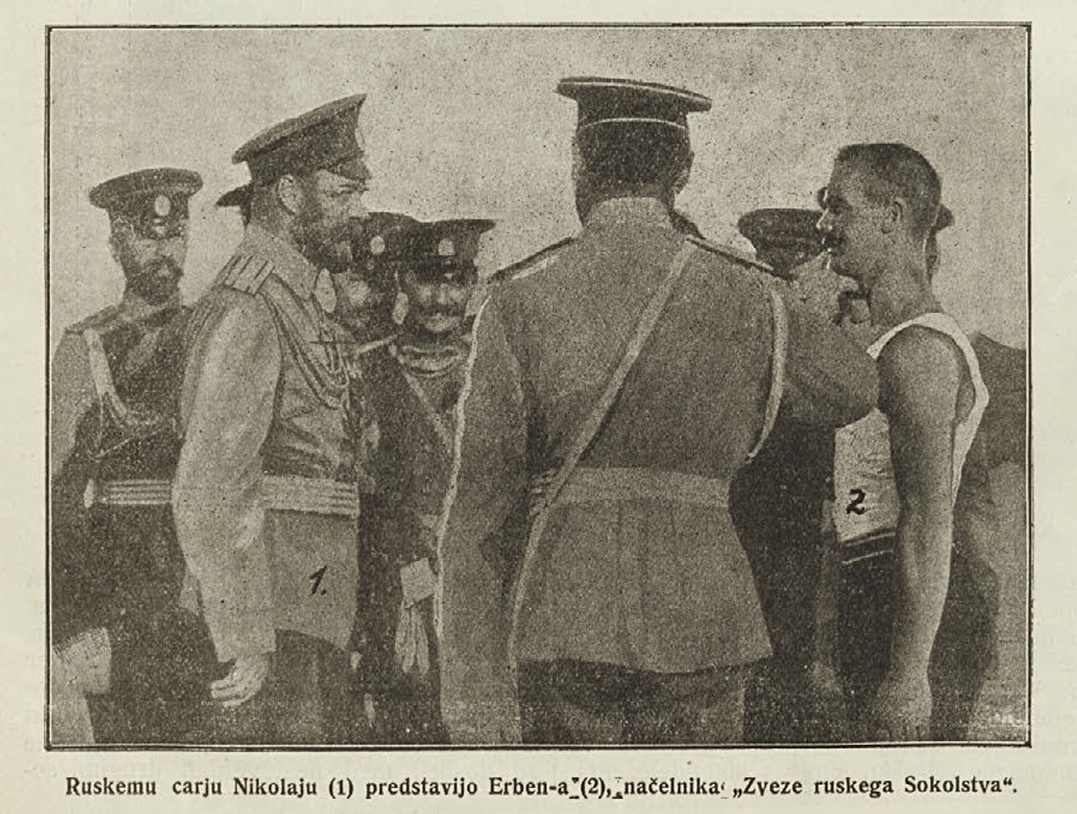
František Erben being presented to Tsar Nicholas II at the 1912 Prague Sokol Slet. Slovenian caption reads "Erben is appointed head of the "Union of Russian Falconry" to the Russian Tsar Nicholas"

At the 1900 Paris Summer Olympics in the Men's Gymnastics Individual All-Around standings, Erben finished in a 3-way tie for 32nd place with 2 French gymnasts. This was the 2nd-highest 3-way tie (among several) in the competition, after the highest 3-way tie, for 23rd place, which consisted of a Swiss gymnast with 2 French gymnasts.

== Post-gymnastics career ==
In addition to his competitive sporting career, Erben was also a very respected and highly sought-after instructor. Against other competing applicants from other countries and systems, such as Germany and Sweden, Erben was chosen by the Russian Government to be a gymnastics teacher at their military academies and "in 1909...was designated teacher of gymnastics at the military academy in Petrograd...Russia.". Previously, Czech Sokol Organisation hired him as a traveling instructor for their organization. During World War I, he joined the Czechoslovak Legion and returned to Czechoslovakia after the war. In May 1925, Erben, described as a "teacher [who] had no equal" was hired as the Director of Sokol instructor schools, concurrent with the opening of the Tyršův dům complex (Tyrš House), in the old Michna Palace.

Despite having suffered several strokes later in life, and being 67 years old, Erben, an active member of Sokol organization, was executed by Nazi Germans at the Kobylisy Shooting Range in Prague, following the assassination of Reinhard Heydrich by the members of Czech resistance.

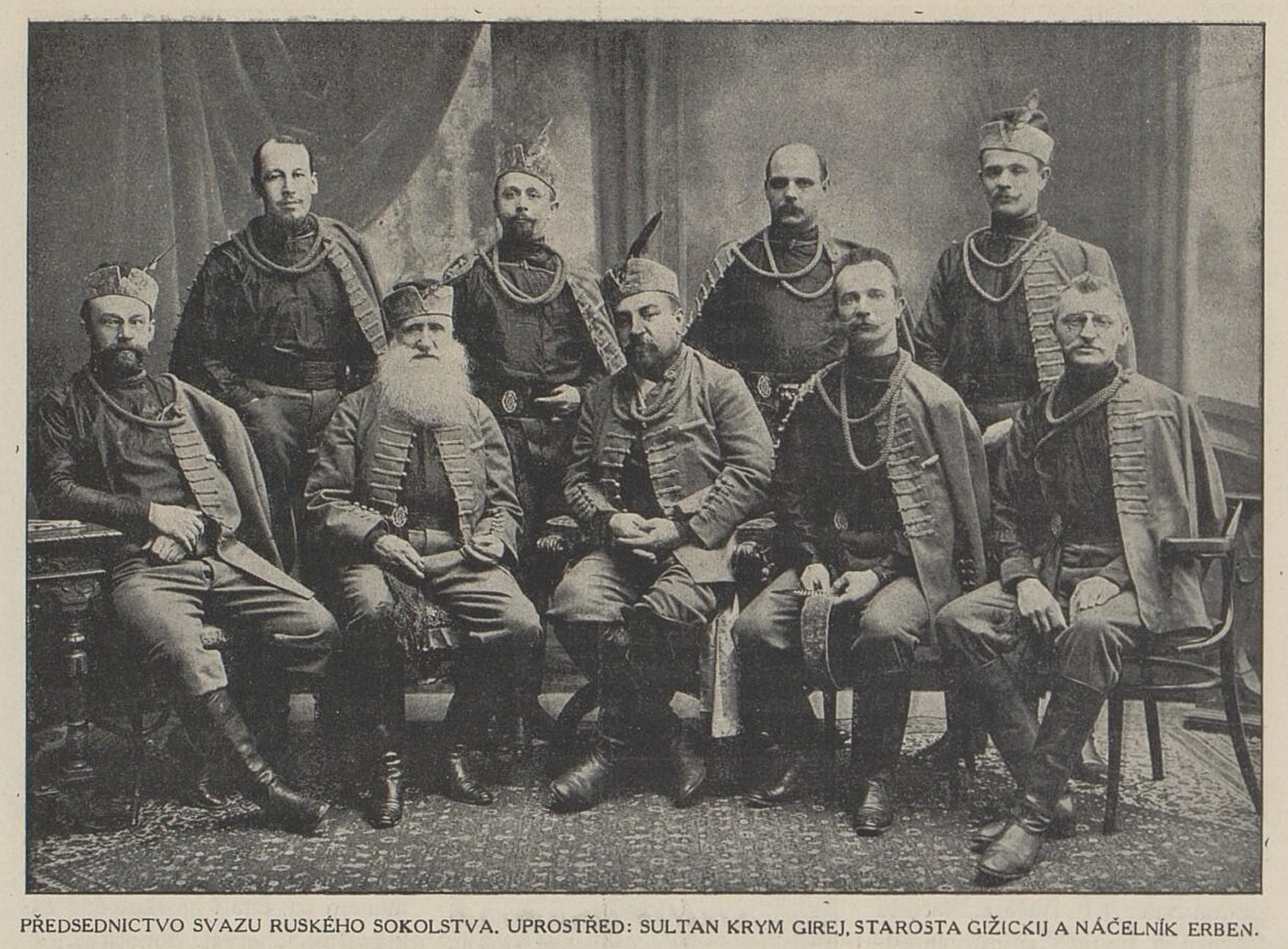
From page 402 of the commemorative publication for the VIth 1912 Prague Sokol Slet, Erben is identified as the Chief for the Russians. The original caption in Czech translates to "The Presidium of the Russian Falconry Union. In the middle: Sultan Krym-Giray, Mayor Gizhitsky and Chief Erben". Giray, Gizhitsky and Erben are, left to right, the center 3 seated in the front row.
