= Georges Charmoille =

French gymnast

- Alternative name: Gustave Charmoille
- Born: 16 September 1878 Villers-Chemin-et-Mont-lès-Étrelles, France
- Died: 4 February 1965 (aged 86) Nancy, France

Gymnastics career
- Discipline: Men's artistic gymnastics
- Country represented: France
Medal record
Men's artistic gymnastics
Representing France
Intercalated Games
Bronze medal – third place	1906 Athens	All-around (5 events)
Bronze medal – third place	1906 Athens	All-around (6 events)
World Championships
Gold medal – first place	1903 Antwerp	Team
Gold medal – first place	1907 Prague	Horizontal bar
Silver medal – second place	1907 Prague	Team

Georges Charmoille was a French gymnast. He was a part of the silver medal-winning French team at the 1907 World Artistic Gymnastics Championships, where, additionally, he won a gold medal on the horizontal bar apparatus.

Charmoille won two bronze medals at the 1906 Intercalated Games held in Greece.
