= Hvozdec =

Hvozdec may refer to places in the Czech Republic:

- Hvozdec (Beroun District), a municipality and village in the Central Bohemian Region
- Hvozdec (Brno-Country District), a municipality and village in the South Moravian Region
- Hvozdec (České Budějovice District), a municipality and village in the South Bohemian Region
- Hvozdec, a village and part of Poříčí nad Sázavou in the Central Bohemian Region

== See also ==
- Hvozd (disambiguation)
