= Josef Seidl =

Czech sportsman, teacher and military officer

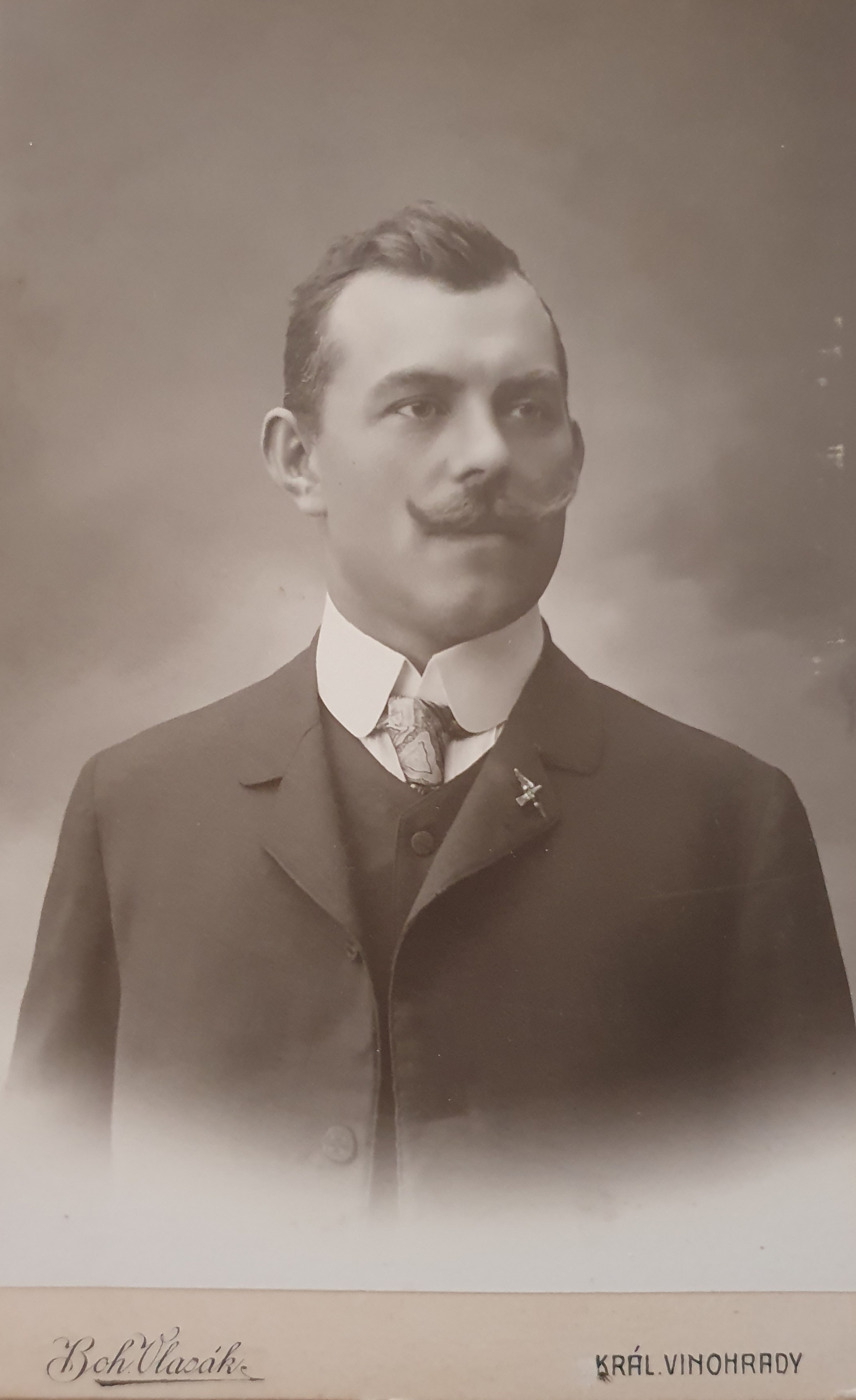
- Seidl in c. 1900

Personal information
- Born: 30 October 1873 Jirkov, Bohemia, Austria-Hungary
- Died: 21 July 1942 (aged 68) Prague, Protectorate of Bohemia and Moravia

Gymnastics career
- Discipline: Men's artistic gymnastics
- Country represented: Bohemia

Josef Seidl (30 October 1873 – 21 July 1942) was a Czech Sokol sportsman, gymnastics teacher and military officer. He was a member of the gold medal-winning team at the 1907 World Artistic Gymnastics Championships. He later served as the Commander of Prague Castle from 1919 to 1935 and was a Czechoslovak legionary. He is also recognized as a key figure in the early development of association football in Chișinău, Moldova.

== Early life ==
Seidl was born in Jirkov, Bohemia, on 30 October 1873, and grew up in Libochovice. After completing his military service (1894–1895), he moved to Prague and became a tailor.

== Gymnastics career ==
Was an active and successful member of the Sokol physical education organization. As a member of the gymnastics team of Sokol won a gold medal at the XXX Congress of the Union of French Gymnasts in Arras in 1904, and another gold medal at the 1907 Pan-Sokol Rally in Prague.

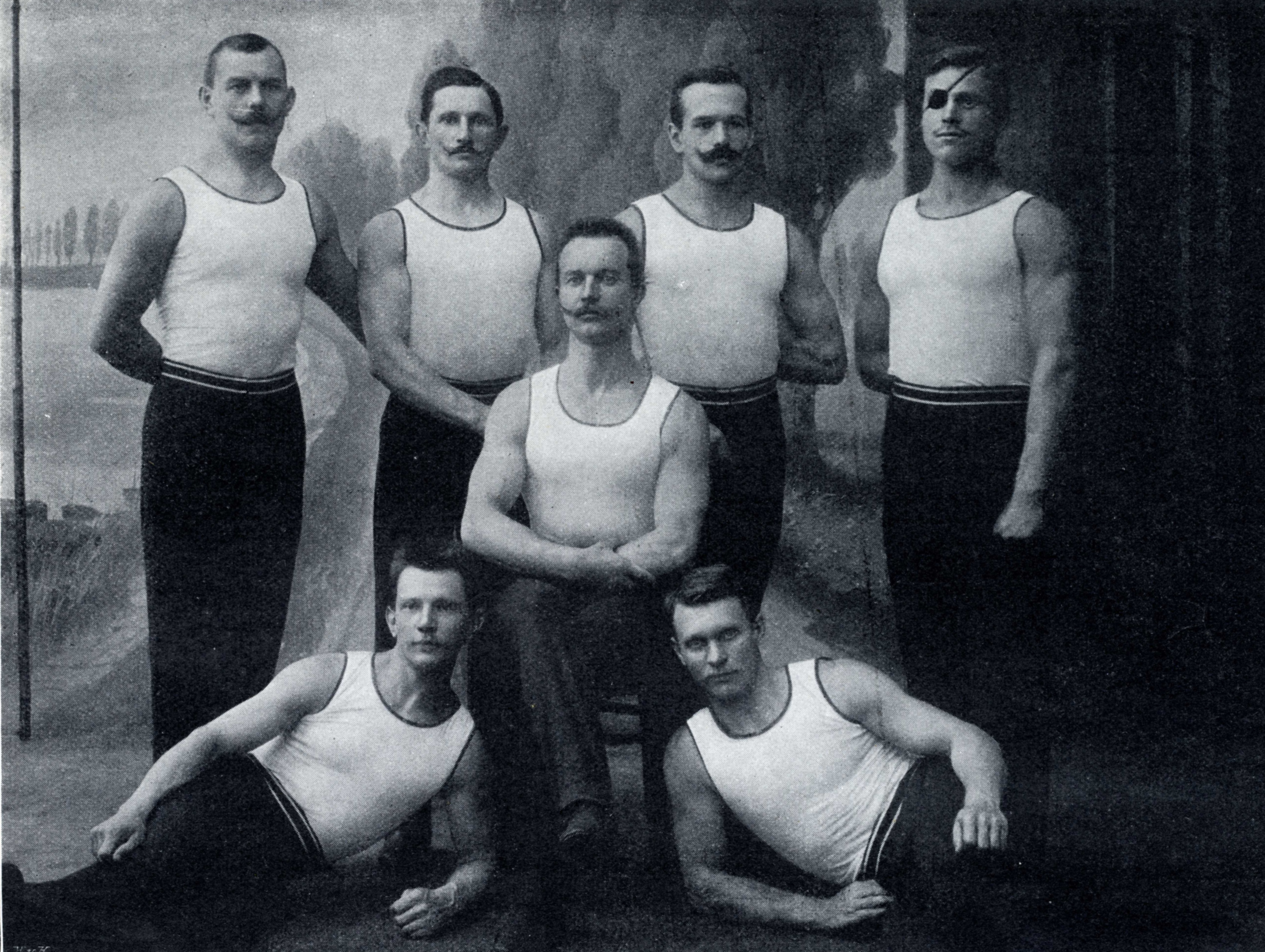
The winning team of the 1907 World Artistic Gymnastics Championships in Prague (top row, from left: Josef Seidl)

In 1905, he accepted an offer to become a gymnastics teacher in the Russian Empire. He worked at a gymnasium in Yalta (1905–1909) and later in Chișinău (1909–1917). Alongside Artur Gottlieb-Gotalov, he significantly contributed to implementing the Sokol system of physical education in secondary schools across Bessarabia and Russia. Between 1912 and 1914, he and his students performed before Tsar Nicholas II, receiving the medal of the Romanov Tercentenary in 1913.

== Post-gymnastics career ==
Following the outbreak of World War I, Seidl actively supported the movement for Czechoslovak independence. In 1917, he enlisted in the Czechoslovak Legions in Chișinău, along with his son Miroslav. He was transported to France and served in the 21st and 22nd Czechoslovak Rifle Regiments, participating in the fighting for the bridgehead near Vouziers in the summer of 1918.

Upon his return to the newly established Czechoslovakia, Seidl, holding the rank of First Lieutenant, was assigned to the Military Office of the President of the Republic (Vojenská kancelář prezidenta republiky) and appointed Commander of Prague Castle. He was responsible for the Castle Guard unit and was involved in introducing the distinctive legionary uniforms the Guard wore between 1928 and 1948. He remained in this post until his retirement as a Colonel on 31 December 1935.

=== "Father of Chișinău Football" ===
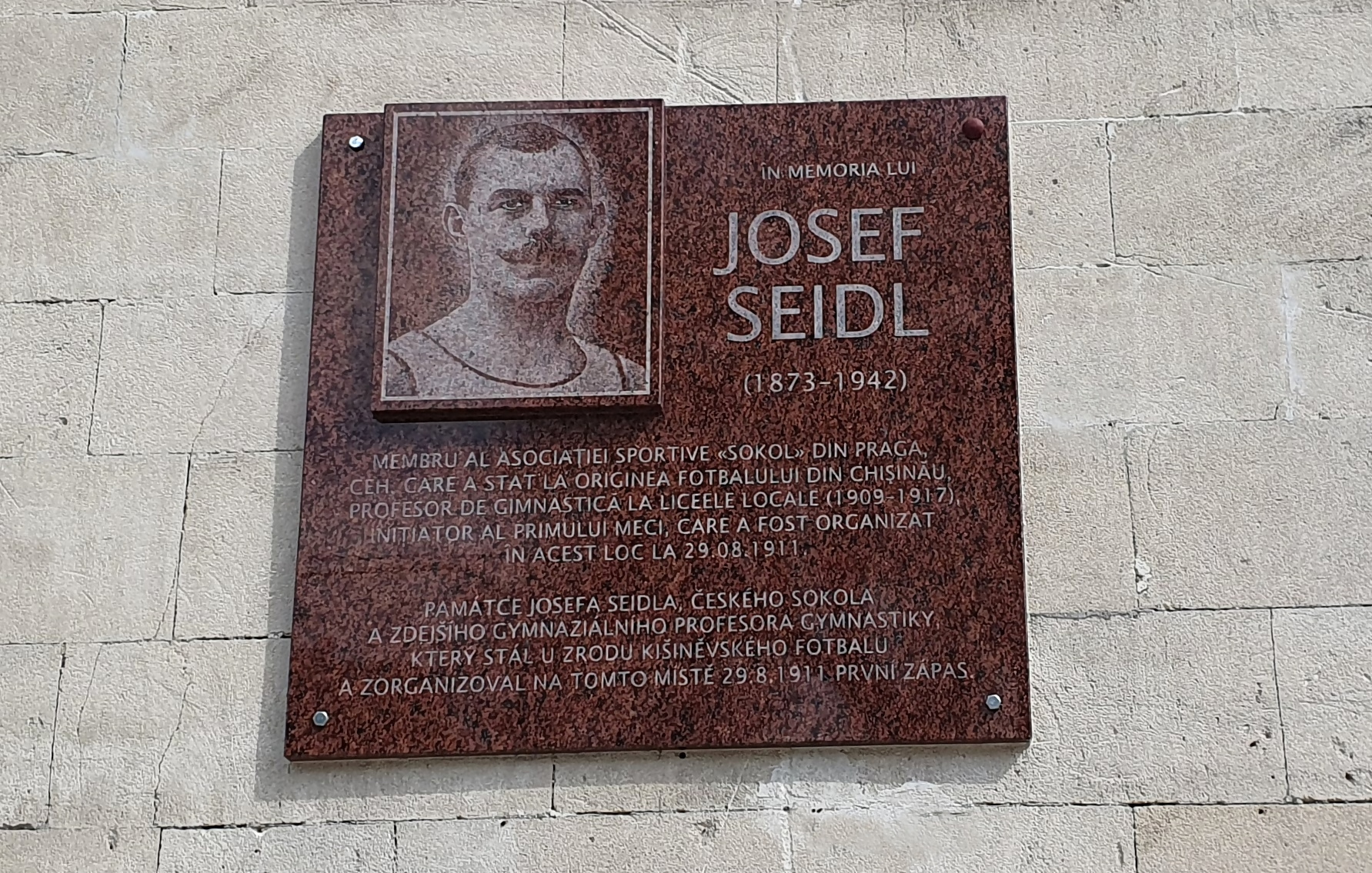
Memorial plaque to Josef Seidl in Chișinău (2023)

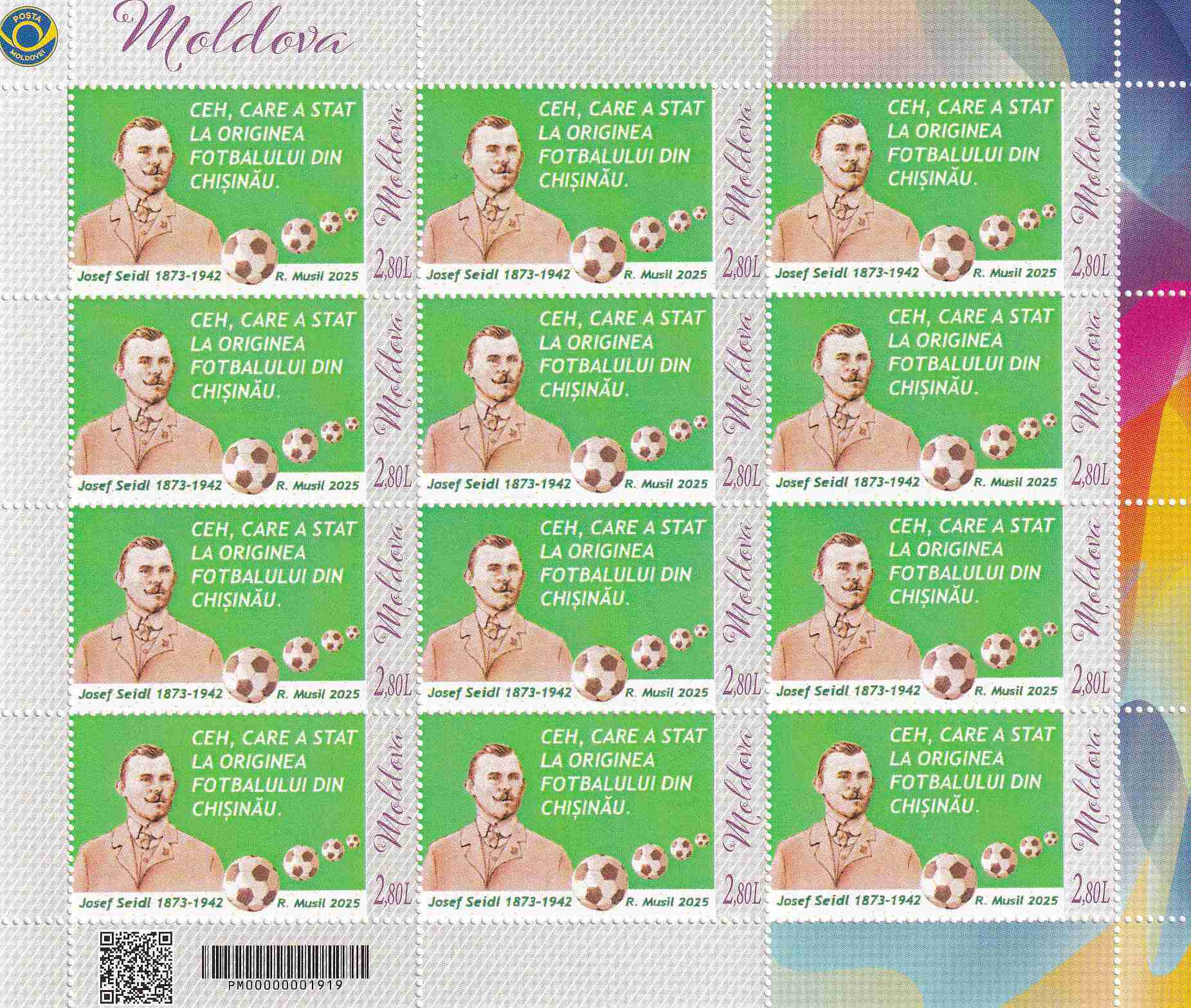
Sheet of postage stamps commemorating Josef Seidl (2025)

While teaching in Chișinău, Seidl introduced the game of football to his students, a sport that quickly gained popularity and led to the formation of several high school teams. On 29 August 1911, Seidl refereed a match between a team from the 2nd Boys' Gymnasium of Chișinău and a team from Odesa. This event is considered a founding milestone in the history of Moldovan football.

== Awards and honors ==
In 2023, a memorial plaque to Josef Seidl was unveiled at the Dinamo Stadium in Chișinău.

In 2025, a limited edition of postage stamp commemorating Josef Seidl issued through the courtessy of the Czech Embassy in Chișinău.

=== Military and civil decorations ===
Josef Seidl won these medals:

- Croix de Guerre 1914–1918, 1919 (France)
- Czechoslovak War Cross 1914–1918, 1918
- Czechoslovak Revolutionary Medal, 1922
- Czechoslovak Victory Medal
- Commemorative war medal 1914–1918 (France)
- Legion of Honour, Officer, 1928 (France)
- Order of Saints Maurice and Lazarus, Officer, 1921 (Italy)
- Order of the Crown of Romania, Commander, 1926 (Romania)
- Order of the Nile (Egypt)
