= 1907 World Artistic Gymnastics Championships =

Gymnastics competition

- Location: (Kingdom of Bohemia) Prague, Bohemia

The victorious Bohemian team at these World Championships. The Bohemian team, and their post-World War I nation-state successor team, the Czechoslovakians, were team champions at 7 of the 9 editions of these World Championships that had team competitions and that existed from their debut at these 3rd 1907 games to the 11th and last games, in 1938, before World War II. This team was composed of numerous individuals who would become quite decorated at the level of these World Championships. Standing, left to right: Josef Seidl, Karel Sál, Josef Čada, Karel Starý; Lying/seated, left to right: František Prečner, František Erben, Bohumil Honzátko

The 3rd Artistic Gymnastics World Championships were held in Prague, Bohemia, in conjunction with the 5th Czech Sokol Slet on 30 June 1907.

A historic signpost in the sometimes contentious politics of the sport occurred with respect to these championships. In a 100-year Anniversary Publication of the International Federation of Gymnastics, a past observation of Dr. Miroslav Klinger, an honorary member of the FIG, was noted with regard to a German magazine article. In that FIG publication, it is written that an article in a 1907 issue of the German publication Deutsche Turnzeitung "dissuaded the non-slavic nations from participating in the international competition in Prague, by saying the competitors could be threatened by violence. The goal of the article was to pressure the president of the European Federation into the renunciation of the Prague event. Nevertheless, the German Federation sent observers to Prague."

The championships were purely team events without any individual awards. Individual all-round scores were only introduced in 1922, with the first all-round individual men's champion being recognised in that year. Individual apparatus scores were introduced subsequently. As such no actual individual medals were awarded at these games, the below rankings were conferred retrospectively.

Conversely, please note that contemporaneous, detailed coverage, beyond merely team totals, of select World Championships prior to World War I exists both in the pages of “Slovenski Sokol” magazine (via the Digital Library of Slovenia) and in reproductions of apparently original and contemporaneous Czech source materials (via Gymnastics-History.com) for both the 3rd (1907) and 6th (1913) editions of the World Championships. In the Czech versions of those sources, reproduced by Gymnastics-History.com, both individual all-around scores and apparatus scores are presented for every competitor, and in the Slovenian versions of those sources, individual all-around scores and rankings are reproduced for the top 14 and very last-place competitor for the 1907 Worlds and for every competitor at the 1913 Worlds. Additionally, all of the data that is presented in each of those sources completely matches the data that both the FIG and USAG (the official governing body of the sport of Artistic gymnastics within the USA) present in their respective treatments on the results of these pre-WWI World Championships, with the sole two exceptions of the horizontal bar placing of French Gymnast Francois Vidal and the parallel bars placement of Belgian gymnast Paul Mangin, both at the 1907 World Championships. (In any event, all of these data sources - the Slovenian records, the Gymnastics-History.com's reproduced Czech records, the FIG's records, and the USAG's records - have continually failed to recognize the apparent original human error with respect to the discrepancy between Vidal's and Mangin's scores and rankings. In light of that, all of these data sources remain completely consistent, in terms of the data that they do present, with respect to the results of the pre-WWI editions of these World Championships.)

Additionally, please note that in lieu of an article published in the 10 June 2024 issue of The International Journal of the History of Sport (a peer-reviewed journal) claiming that the BFEG’s (the FIG’s predecessor) archives from before 1950 appear to have been lost, a brief biographical treatment containing a photograph of multiple medals belonging to 1911 World All-Around Champion Ferdinand Steiner on the website of an alma mater of his, the Jiří Wolkera Gymnasium, shows multiple medals with the words "Concorso Ginnastico Internazionale 1911 Torino" embossed onto them. This brief biographical treatment was published at least as far back as 14 January 2017 on the official Facebook website of his alma mater in a photograph album, begun on 29 November 2016, containing other such brief biographical treatments of its notable alumni. That pictoral presentation of Steiner’s medals helps suggest that individual medals were awarded for those 1911 World Championships as they were from the same locale and year as the 1911 Worlds, and with the original title of the competition being printed on those medals, this further helps suggest that these individual medals were awarded contemporaneously.

== Medals ==
Rank	Nation	Gold	Silver	Bronze	Total
1	Czechoslovakia (TCH)	4	1	3	8
2	France (FRA)	2	3	2	7
3	Belgium (BEL)	0	0	1	1
Totals (3 entries)		6	4	6	16

† The FIG (now World Gymnastics) in their 125-year anniversary publication, whereas pre-World War I editions of these championships are concerned, credits the teams and athletes from the Bohemian/Czech lands, then part of Austria-Hungary, as belonging to Czechoslovakia, and also credits the teams and athletes from Slovenia, then also part of Austria-Hungary, as belonging to Yugoslavia.

== Team competition ==
Rank	Nation	Gymnast	Preliminaries Events							Gymnastics Events											Athletics Events					Individual Grand Totals		Team Scores		Team Grand Totals
Rank	Nation	Gymnast	1st Prelim	2nd Prelim	3rd Prelim	4th Prelim	5th Prelim	Prelim Totals	Prelim Totals Rank	Comp.	Opt.	Totals	Comp.	Opt.	Totals	Comp.	Opt.	Totals	Gymnastics Events Totals	Gymnastics Events Totals Rank	Long Jump	Weight Lifting	150 meters	Athletics Totals	Athletics Totals Rank	Grand Totals	Grand Totals Rank	Team Exercise Grand Totals	Team Behavior	Final Grand Totals
1st place, gold medalist(s)	Czechoslovakia	Josef Čada	10	9.5	9	9	10	47.5	6	9.25	11.5	20.75	11.25	11.75	23	9.5	10.5	20	63.75	4	20	20	16	56	1	167.25	1	944.5	6.75	951.25
1st place, gold medalist(s)	Czechoslovakia	František Erben	9.5	9.25	9.75	9	9.25	46.75	9	8.5	12	20.5	11.75	12	23.75	10.75	11.5	22.25	66.5	1	12	16	16	44	22	157.25	3	944.5	6.75	951.25
1st place, gold medalist(s)	Czechoslovakia	Karel Starý	9	8.5	9	9	9	44.5	17	8.75	10	18.75	11	11.75	22.75	10	8.75	18.75	60.25	10	12	20	20	52	5	156.75	4	944.5	6.75	951.25
1st place, gold medalist(s)	Czechoslovakia	Karel Sál	8.75	9	9	8.25	9	44	21	8.75	9.5	18.25	10.25	11.5	21.75	10.5	10.25	20.75	60.75	9	14	20	16	50	7	154.75	6	944.5	6.75	951.25
1st place, gold medalist(s)	Czechoslovakia	Josef Seidl	9.75	8.75	9	8.75	10	46.25	12	9.25	11	20.25	8	10.5	18.55	9.5	10	19.5	58.25	13	14	20	16	50	7	154.5	7	944.5	6.75	951.25
1st place, gold medalist(s)	Czechoslovakia	Bohumil Honzátko	8	9.25	9.5	9	9.25	45	15	8	11	19	8	11.25	19.25	9.75	8	17.75	56	16	20	17	16	53	4	154	9	944.5	6.75	951.25
1st place, gold medalist(s)	Czechoslovakia	Totals:	-	-	-	-	-	275	-	-	-	119.50	-	-	113	60	59	119	-	-	92	113	100	-	-	944.5		944.5	6.75	951.25
2nd place, silver medalist(s)	France	Jules Rolland	9.25	9	9.5	9.75	9.75	47.25	7	9	11	20	11.5	12	23.5	10.5	10.5	21	64.55	2	14	17	16	47	13	158.75	2	915.5	7.5	923
2nd place, silver medalist(s)	France	Francois Vidal†	9.75	9.75	9.25	9.75	9.75	48.25	3	10.5	7	17.5	12	12	24	10	10.25	20.25	61.75	7	14	14	18	46	15	156	5	915.5	7.5	923
2nd place, silver medalist(s)	France	Georges Charmoille	9	9	9.5	8.5	9.5	45.5	13	7.75	10.75	18.5	11.75	12	23.75	8.75	8	16.75	59	12	20	13	14	47	13	151.5	11	915.5	7.5	923
2nd place, silver medalist(s)	France	Joseph Castigliani	8.75	9	8.5	9	9.5	44.75	16	9.5	9.75	19.25	11.75	10.5	22.25	10	10.25	20.25	61.75	7	12	20	16	48	11	154.5	7	915.5	7.5	923
2nd place, silver medalist(s)	France	Louis Ségura	10	9.75	9.75	9.75	10	49.25	1	10.75	9.75	20.5	11	12	23	8.5	11	19.5	63	5	10	10	16	36	32	148.25	13	915.5	7.5	923
2nd place, silver medalist(s)	France	Joseph Lux	9.5	10	9.5	9	10	48	4	10.25	11.5	21.75	11	12	23	9.5	10.25	19.75	64.5	2	6	14	14	34	35	146.5	15	915.5	7.5	923
2nd place, silver medalist(s)	France	Totals:	-	-	-	-	-	284.50	-	-	-	119.50	-	-	141.50	57.25	60.25	117.5	-	-	76	88	94	-	-	915.5		915.5	7.5	923
3rd place, bronze medalist(s)	Belgium	Louis de Winter	9.5	9.5	9.5	9.25	9.25	47	8	5.75	8	13.75	9.75	10.75	20.5	11.25	8.25	19.50	53.75	19	14	20	18	52	5	152.75	10	864.25	8	872.25
3rd place, bronze medalist(s)	Belgium	Leo Pauvels	8.75	9	9.5	10	6	43.25	23	8.5	10.5	19	11	11.5	22.5	10.75	9.75	20.5	62	6	14	16	16	46	15	151.25	12	864.25	8	872.25
3rd place, bronze medalist(s)	Belgium	Charles Lannie	9.25	9	9.5	9.25	9.5	46.5	10	7	10	17	10	10	20	9.75	8.75	18.50	55.5	17	10	20	16	46	15	148	14	864.25	8	872.25
3rd place, bronze medalist(s)	Belgium	Pol Giesenfeld	9	10	9.5	10	10	48.5	2	8	10	18	11	11.5	22.5	8.75	7	15.75	56.25	15	10	15	14	39	28	143.75	17	864.25	8	872.25
3rd place, bronze medalist(s)	Belgium	Paul Mangin†	8.5	9.25	9	9.5	9	45.25	14	7.75	8	15.75	11	11.75	22.75	11.25	9.75	21	59.5	11	12	11	14	37	29	141.75	19	864.25	8	872.25
3rd place, bronze medalist(s)	Belgium	Henri Carsan	8	8.75	8.25	8.75	8.5	42.25	27	3.75	5.5	9.25	6.75	8	14.75	10.25	9.5	19.75	43.75	25	8	18	14	40	26	126	27	864.25	8	872.25
3rd place, bronze medalist(s)	Belgium	Totals:	-	-	-	-	-	274.75	-	-	-	94.75	-	-	125	62	53	115	-	-	68	100	92	-	-	864.25		864.25	8	872.25
4	Luxembourg	Nikol Kanive	8.75	7.5	7.5	7.25	8.75	39.75	28	5.5	7.75	13.25	10.25	11	21.25	7.5	6.5	14	48.5	21	18	18	18	54	2	142.25	18	782	6.75	788.75
4	Luxembourg	André Bordaug	9.5	9.5	9.75	9.75	9.5	48	4	7.25	8.75	16	2	11.25	13.25	6.5	6.5	13	42.25	28	12	18	16	46	15	136.25	20	782	6.75	788.75
4	Luxembourg	Guillaume Hary	8	8	8	6	8	38	30	9	7	16	10.25	11.75	22	7	6	13	51	20	12	20	14	46	15	135	21	782	6.75	788.75
4	Luxembourg	Charles Behm	6.5	7	6.25	4	6.5	30.25	36	6.25	7	13.25	9.5	9	18.5	7.25	6	13.25	45	23	12	20	18	50	7	125.25	28	782	6.75	788.75
4	Luxembourg	Nikolaus Kummer	9.5	8.75	8.5	7	9.75	43.5	22	8.25	7.25	15.5	6	10	16	6.5	5.75	12.25	43.75	25	6	15	16	37	29	124.25	30	782	6.75	788.75
4	Luxembourg	Ernes Greiveldinger	7.5	8	8	7	7.5	38	30	4	9.25	13.25	2	11.25	13.25	7.5	6	13.5	40	32	10	20	16	46	15	124	31	782	6.75	788.75
4	Luxembourg	Totals:	-	-	-	-	-	239	-	-	-	84.25	-	-	106.25	42.25	36.75	79	-	-	70	111	98	-	-	782		782	6.75	788.75
5	Yugoslavia†	Albin Kandare	8	9	9.25	9	9.25	44.5	17	7.25	9.5	16.75	11.5	11.75	23.25	9.75	8.5	18.25	58.25	13	6	20	16	42	24	144.75	34	765.25	6	771.25
5	Yugoslavia†	Dr. Viktor Murnik	8	8	8	7.5	7	38.5	29	6.5	8	14.5	10.5	11.25	21.75	9	9	18	54.25	18	10	20	12	42	24	134.75	22	765.25	6	771.25
5	Yugoslavia†	Anton Thaler	8	8.75	8.5	9	9.25	43.25	23	4	7	11	8	10.75	18.75	8	7.25	15.25	45	23	6	9	12	37	29	125.25	28	765.25	6	771.25
5	Yugoslavia†	Fran Miklavk	8	7.5	7.75	7.75	6.5	37.5	33	5	6.75	11.75	2	8.5	10.5	8.75	10.5	19.25	41.5	29	14	15	14	43	23	122	32	765.25	6	771.25
5	Yugoslavia†	Vladimir Deklevek	9	9.25	9	8.5	8.75	44.5	17	6	6	12	2	10	12	8.25	8	16.25	40.25	31	10	11	14	35	33	119.75	33	765.25	6	771.25
5	Yugoslavia†	Josip Rihar	9.5	8.75	9	9.5	9.75	46.5	10	4.75	6.5	11.25	2	7	9	8	9	17	37.25	33	10	15	10	35	33	118.75	34	765.25	6	771.25
5	Yugoslavia†	Totals:	-	-	-	-	-	256	-	-	-	78.25	-	-	97.25	51.75	52.25	104	-	-	56	100	78	-	-	765.25		765.25	6	771.25
6	Hungary	Nandor Kovats	8.75	9	8.75	9.25	8.75	44.5	17	4.25	8.75	13	2	10.5	12.5	8	7.5	15.5	41	30	12	20	16	48	11	133.5	23	727.25	6	733.25
6	Hungary	Lajos Kmetykó	8.75	8.75	8.25	7.5	9.25	42.5	26	2.75	7.25	10	2	9	11	8.75	5.5	14.25	35.25	34	20	16	18	54	2	131.75	24	727.25	6	733.25
6	Hungary	János Kmetykó	7.5	7.5	8	7.5	7.5	38	30	4.75	7	11.75	10	8	18	6.25	7.5	13.75	43.5	27	16	20	14	50	7	131.5	25	727.25	6	733.25
6	Hungary	Lakatos Bela	7	6.5	7.5	7	8	36	34	8.25	10.5	18.75	6.5	8.5	15	5.5	6.75	12.25	46	22	16	12	18	46	15	128	26	727.25	6	733.25
6	Hungary	Hándor Bak	8.5	9.75	8	7.5	9	42.75	25	2.5	4.5	7	1	10	11	6.75	6	12.75	30.75	35	14	12	14	40	27	113.5	35	727.25	6	733.25
6	Hungary	Karoly Bajor	6	7	6.5	6	6.75	32.25	35	2.75	4	6.75	1	5.5	6.5	6.5	5	11.5	24.75	36	6	10	16	32	36	89	36	727.25	6	733.25
6	Hungary	Totals:	-	-	-	-	-	237.50	-	-	-	68.25	-	-	76	41.75	38.25	80	-	-	84	90	96	-	-	727.25		727.25	6	733.25

== All Round ==
Rank	Athlete	Total
1.	(Czechoslovakia) Josef Čada	167.250
2.	(France) Jules Rolland	158.750
3.	(Czechoslovakia) František Erben	157.250

== High Bar ==
Ranlk	Athlete	Total
1.	(France) Georges Charmoille	23.750
1.	(Czechoslovakia) František Erben	23.750
3.	(France) Jules Rolland	23.500

†=The website Gymnastics-History.com, in a blog entry about the 1907 World Championships, states that "In 125 Years of the FIG: The Story Goes on, the FIG lists Erben and Charmoille as the high bar champions. That is a mistake, given that [Francois] Vidal had a perfect 24 on high bar" and goes on to reproduce apparently original source material therein identified as "V. slet všesokolský 1907: pamětní list vydaný" that replicates that fact." As it currently stands now, the FIG fails to recognize Vidal as a medalist, much less a champion, on this event. In other areas of this competition, also, Vidal was one of the highest scorers.

== Parallel bars ==
Rank	Athlete	Total
1.	(France) Joseph Lux	21.750
2.	(Czechoslovakia) Josef Čada	20.750
3.	(France) Louis Ségura	20.500
3.	(Czechoslovakia) František Erben	20.500

== Pommel Horse ==
Rank	Athlete	Total
1.	(Czechoslovakia) František Erben	22.250
2.	(Czechoslovakia) Jules Rolland	21.000
3.	(Czechoslovakia) Karel Sál	20.750

†=Belgian Paul Mangin's combined score of 21 on the Pommel Horse apparatus should have garnered him a tied-for-silver finish (with Jules Rolland of France), and also dropped Bohemian Karel Sál out of the medal-place finishes, however none of this is indicated in the FIG’s record, as it currently stands.
