= Augusta Rozsypalová =

Czech politician and educator

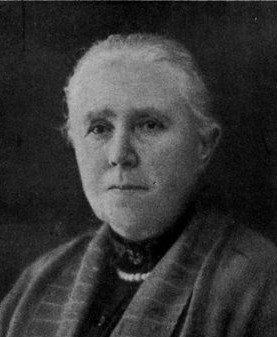

Member of the Chamber of Deputies
- In office 1920–1925

Personal details
- Born: 19 February 1857; Görkau, Austrian Empire
- Died: 23 November 1925 (aged 68); Prague, Czechoslovakia

Augusta Rozsypalová (19 February 1857 – 23 November 1925) was a Czech teacher and politician. In 1920 she was one of the first group of women elected to the Chamber of Deputies, remaining in parliament until her death five years later.

== Biography ==
Rozsypalová was born in Görkau in the Austrian Empire (now Jirkov, Czech Republic) in 1857. She trained to be a handicraft teacher in Louny. After working in Kutná Hora, she became a teacher in Blovice and then taught at the Eugenum Institute in Kladno and a school in Plzeň. She was a member of the Union of Christian Teachers and the Union of Catholic Teachers. Having also become involved in Catholic women's associations, she was one of the founders of the Women's Christian-Social Movement and was appointed editor of the Žena magazine in 1918.

Following the independence of Czechoslovakia at the end of World War I, in 1919 Rozsypalová was a founder member of the Czechoslovak People's Party (ČSL) and was elected to its executive committee. The following year she was a ČSL candidate for the Chamber of Deputies in the parliamentary elections, and was one of sixteen women elected to parliament. In 1921, she became head of the Union of Catholic Women's Associations in Bohemia. She was elected to the Senate in the 1925 elections, but died before she could take her seat.
