= Michna Palace =

Building in Prague, Czech Republic

Coordinates: 50°5′0″N 14°24′18″E

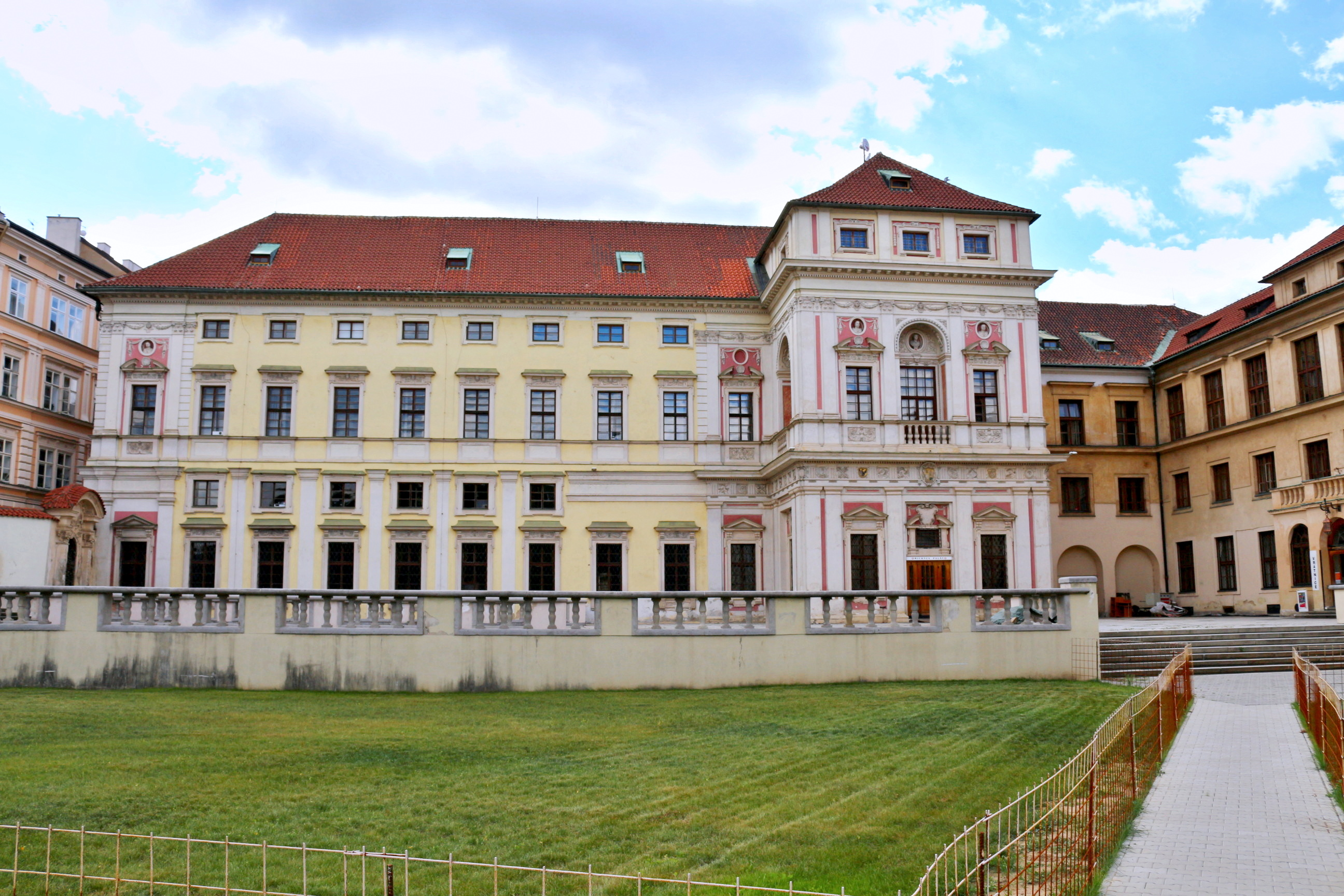
Front view

Michna Palace (Czech: Michnův palác) is a Baroque palace in the Malá Strana quarter of Prague, Czech Republic. It was built in the 17th century for Pavel Michna of Vacínov on the site of an earlier Renaissance-style summer palace, built around 1580 for the Kinsky family, which Michna had purchased in 1623. While the ambitious design was never completed as planned, the palace has nevertheless been called "one of the most valuable architectural monuments in the town". After the First World War the building, then in poor condition, was acquired as the Prague headquarters of the Sokol movement and restored as part of what is now the Tyrš House complex.

Since 1958, Michna Palace has been protected as a cultural monument.
