= Jules Rolland =

French gymnast (1877–1929)

Jules Louis Rolland
- Born: 24 March 1877 Valentigney, France
- Died: 14 January 1929 (aged 51) Hautmont, France

Gymnastics career
- Discipline: Men's artistic gymnastics
- Country represented: France
Medal record
Representing France
World Championships
| Silver medal – second place | 1907 Prague | Team |
| Silver medal – second place | 1907 Prague | All-Around |
| Silver medal – second place | 1907 Prague | Pommel horse |
| Bronze medal – third place | 1907 Prague | Horizontal bar |

Jules Louis Rolland (24 March 1877 – 14 January 1929) was a French gymnast. He competed in the men's individual all-around event at the 1900 Summer Olympics and competed at the 1908 Summer Olympics. Additionally, he competed at the 1907 World Artistic Gymnastics Championships, helping his French team to silver, and also winning individual medals of silver in the all-around combined exercises and pommel horse apparatus, as well as bronze on the horizontal bar.
