= Jirkov =

- Town
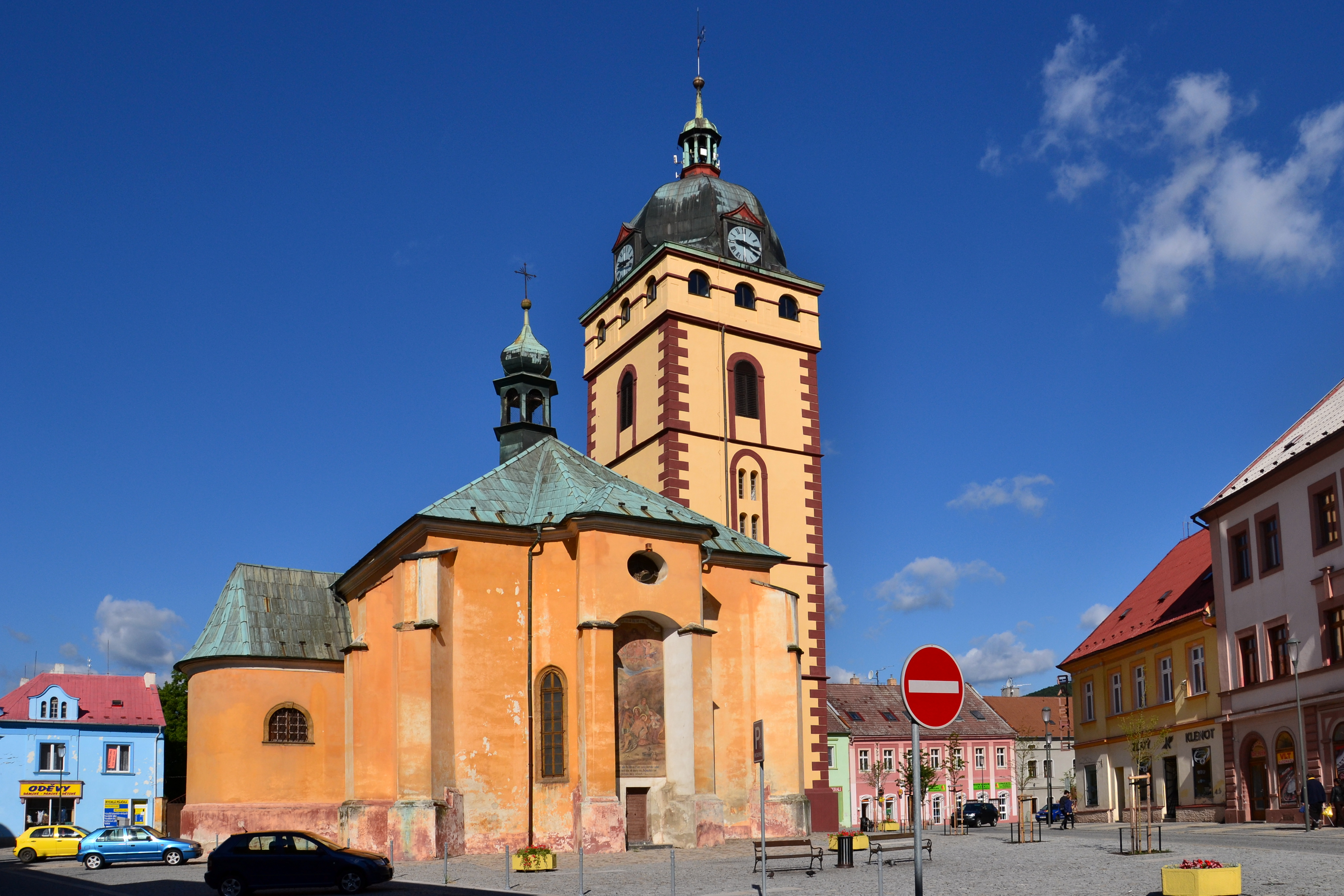
- Church of Saint Giles and the Town Tower

- Flag Coat of arms

- Location in the Czech Republic
- Coordinates: 50°30′1″N 13°26′31″E
- Country: Czech Republic
- Region: Ústí nad Labem
- District: Chomutov
- First mentioned: 1321

Government
  - Mayor: Jiří Šruma

Area
  - Total: 17.01 km^{2} (6.57 sq mi)
- Elevation: 305 m (1,001 ft)

Population (2026-01-01)
  - Total: 19,067
  - Density: 1,121/km^{2} (2,903/sq mi)
- Time zone: UTC+1 (CET)
  - Summer (DST): UTC+2 (CEST)
- Postal code: 431 11
- Website: www.jirkov.cz

Jirkov (Czech pronunciation: [ˈjɪrkof]; German: Görkau) is a town in Chomutov District in the Ústí nad Labem Region of the Czech Republic. It has about 19,000 inhabitants. Jirkov is located on the Bílina River on the border between the Most Basin and Ore Mountains and creates a conurbation with the city of Chomutov. The most important monuments in Jirkov include the Červený Hrádek Castle and the Church of Saint Giles.

== Administrative division ==
Jirkov consists of five municipal parts (in brackets population according to the 2021 census):

- Jirkov (17,499)
- Březenec (668)
- Červený Hrádek (165)
- Jindřišská (25)
- Vinařice (30)

== Etymology ==
The name is derived from the personal name Jirek (a diminutive of Jiří), meaning "Jirek's (court)". The personal name was initially written as Jurek and the settlement's name as Jurkov.

== Geography ==
Jirkov lies in close proximity to the city of Chomutov, with which it forms a conurbation. It is located about 44 km (27 mi) southwest of Ústí nad Labem. It lies on the border between the Most Basin and Ore Mountains. The highest point is at 590 m (1,940 ft) above sea level. The Bílina River flows through the town.

== History ==
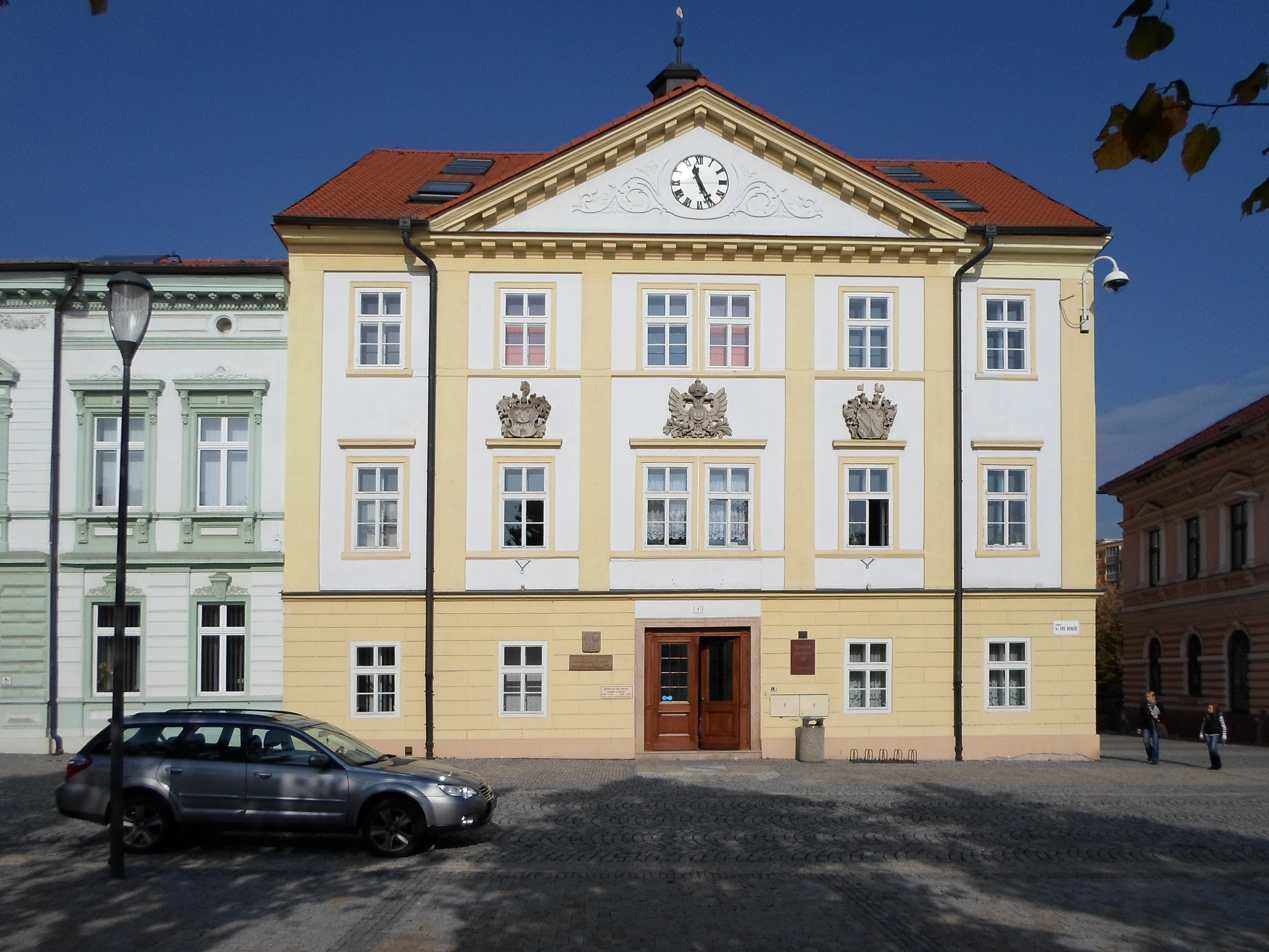
Town hall

Jirkov was established as a colonisation village on the Czech-Saxon border in the second half of the 13th century. The first written mention of Jirkov is from 1321 under the name Borek, the name Jirkov (that time written Jurkov) began to be used soon after.

From 1938 to 1945, Jirkov was annexed by Nazi Germany and administered as part of the Reichsgau Sudetenland. After the surrender of Germany, nearly all of the town's German inhabitants were expelled, and new Czech settlers found a new home in the depopulated town.

== Demographics ==
Historical population

Year	Pop.	±%
1869	4,322	—
1880	4,713	+9.0%
1890	5,170	+9.7%
1900	5,781	+11.8%
1910	6,261	+8.3%

Year	Pop.	±%
1921	6,130	−2.1%
1930	7,750	+26.4%
1950	6,000	−22.6%
1961	9,928	+65.5%
1970	11,249	+13.3%

Year	Pop.	±%
1980	11,980	+6.5%
1991	18,229	+52.2%
2001	20,717	+13.6%
2011	19,461	−6.1%
2021	18,387	−5.5%

Source: Censuses

== Economy ==
There are no large companies based in the town. The largest industrial employers are Thermoflex Europe (manufacturer of plastic components for the automotive industry) and Intermont Opatrný (reconstruction of buildings and their technical equipment), both with more than 100 employees.

== Transport ==
Jirkov is the terminus and starting point of the railway line from/to Lužná via Chomutov.

Jirkov and neighbouring Chomutov together operate a transport company. In addition to buses, public transport is provided also by trolleybuses.

== Sport ==
Every year the town organises the Jirkov Crossmarathon and Half marathon. The tradition began in 2001.

== Sights ==
=== Červený Hrádek Castle ===
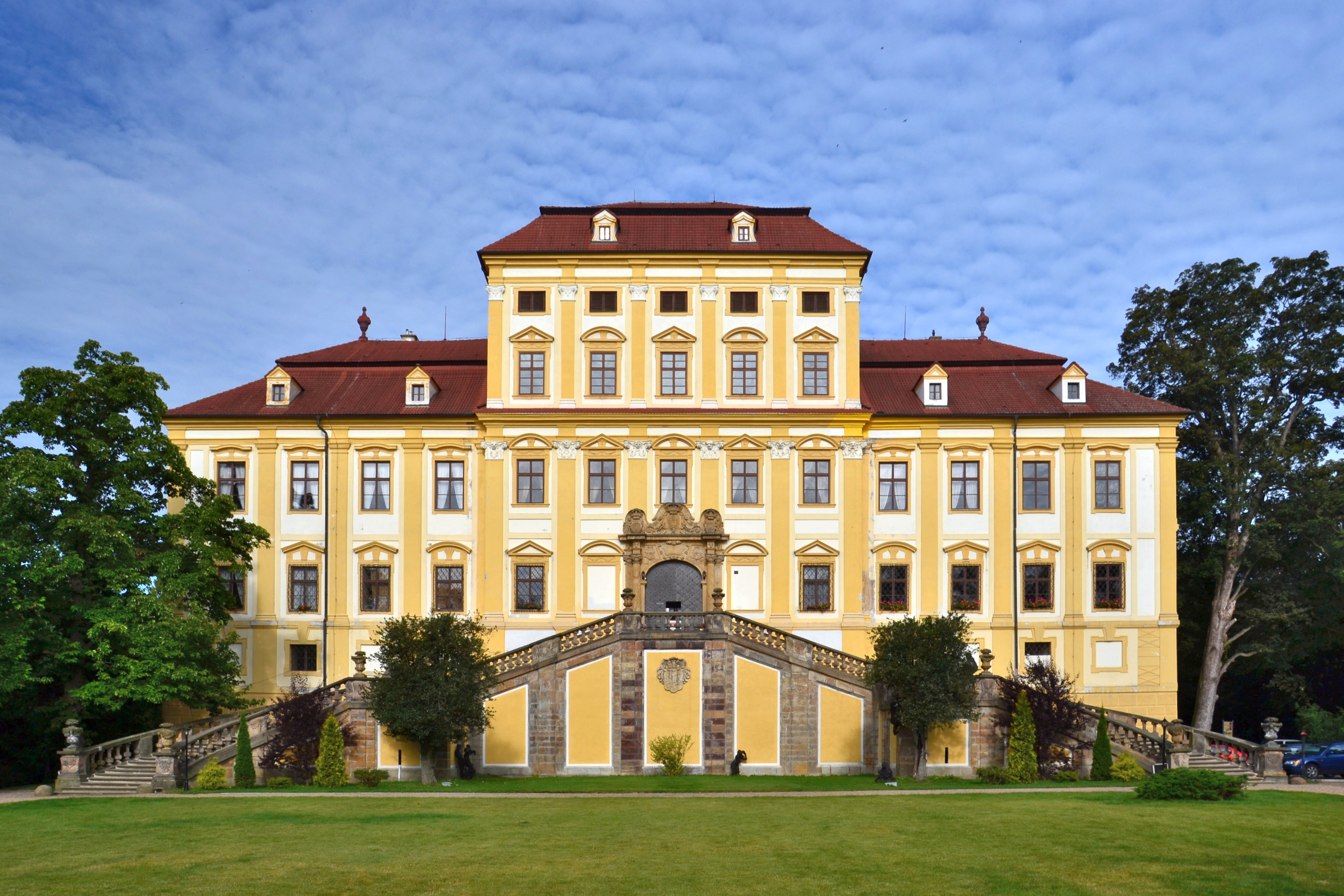
Červený Hrádek Castle

Červený Hrádek Castle (formerly Borek Castle) was founded by the Kraa family prior to 1415. The castle was sacked by the Hussites in 1421 and, after renovation later in the 15th century, the façade was painted red – hence the name Červený Hrádek ('red castle'). In 1687 and 1688, the baroque sculptor Jan Brokoff carved statues, fountains and other works at the castle. His son Ferdinand Maxmilian Brokoff, also a sculptor, was born there.

The last aristocratic family to own the castle were the Hohenlohe-Langenburgs. Max Egon Hohenlohe, the last owner, tried to prevent the occupation of Czechoslovakia by Nazi Germany through diplomatic negotiations when he allowed the meeting of the British mediator in the dispute between Germany and Czechoslovakia over the Sudetenland, Lord Runciman, with the leader of the Sudeten German Party, Konrad Henlein, at the castle in August 1938. After World War II, Prince Max Egon was expropriated by the communist government.

Accessible areas of the castle include the castle's chapel, the hall of mirrors, the art gallery and the study of Max Egon Hohenlohe.

=== Town cellars ===
Long Cellar, also called Sand Cellar, was built in 1555. It was built for 40 years and it had 150 counters. Long Cellar served to the brewery and to a beer storage. Thanks to this, the beer was better. Beer was brewed in Jirkov from 1443. People brewed beer in the 16th and 17th centuries. A brewery was built near the cellar in 1841; thanks to this, Long Cellar lost importance.

Since 2006, the town cellars are accessible for visitors. Since 2011, the town cellars has been protected as a cultural monument.

=== Church of Saint Giles ===
The oldest monument in Jirkov is the Church of Saint Giles. Its existence was mentioned already in 1300. It was newly built in 1568, the original parts of the building have been preserved.

== Notable people ==
- Ferdinand Brokoff (1688–1731), sculptor
- Augusta Rozsypalová (1857–1925), teacher and politician
- Josef Seidl (1873–1942), gymnast, teacher and military officer
- David Kämpf (born 1995), ice hockey player

== Twin towns – sister cities ==
Jirkov is twinned with:

- Bátonyterenye, Hungary
- Brand-Erbisdorf, Germany
- Kobylnica, Poland
- Nové Mesto nad Váhom, Slovakia
- Šentjur, Slovenia

== Gallery ==
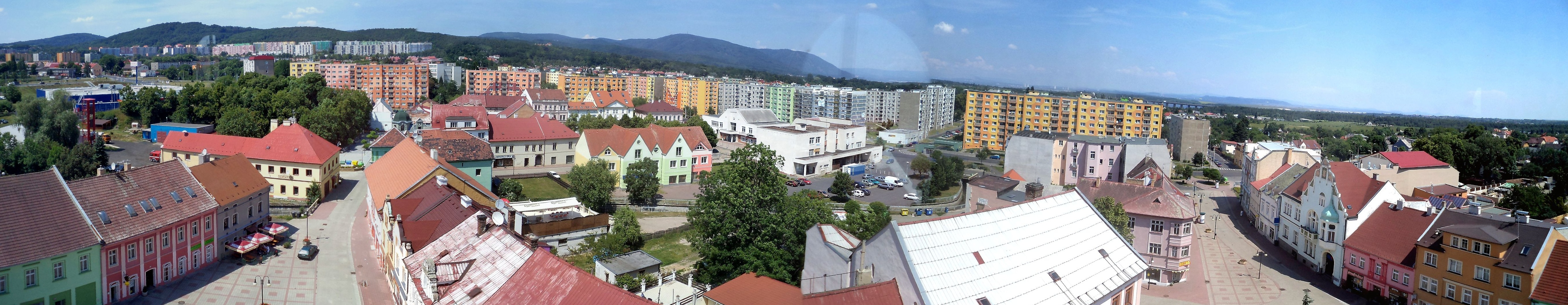
View from the Town Tower
