= Hvozd (Prostějov District) =

- Municipality
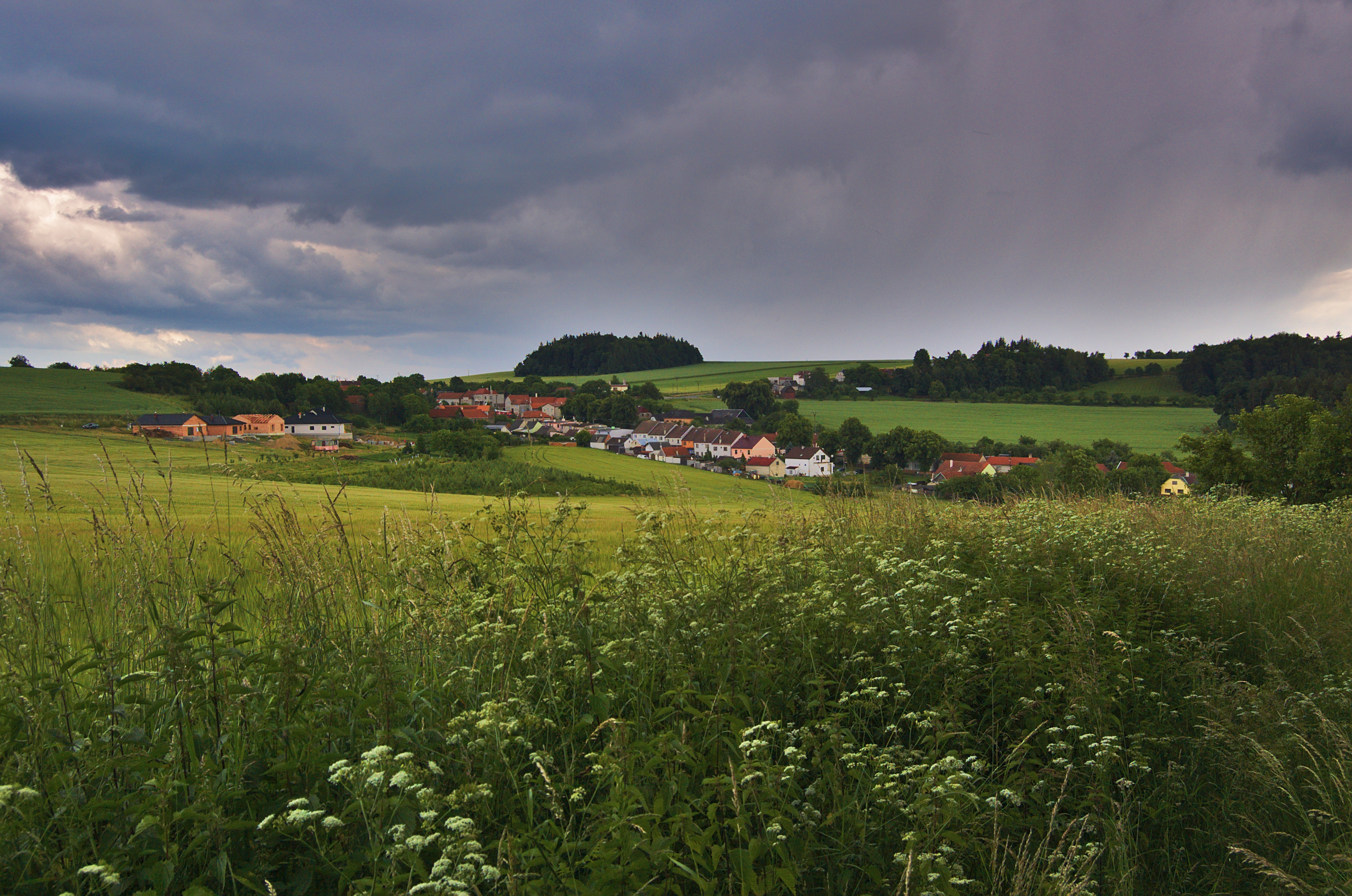
- View from the northwest

- Location in the Czech Republic
- Coordinates: 49°38′10″N 16°54′36″E
- Country: Czech Republic
- Region: Olomouc
- District: Prostějov
- First mentioned: 1275

Area
  - Total: 12.38 km^{2} (4.78 sq mi)
- Elevation: 502 m (1,647 ft)

Population (2026-01-01)
  - Total: 653
  - Density: 52.7/km^{2} (137/sq mi)
- Time zone: UTC+1 (CET)
  - Summer (DST): UTC+2 (CEST)
- Postal codes: 798 52, 798 55
- Website: www.hvozd.cz

Hvozd is a municipality and village in Prostějov District in the Olomouc Region of the Czech Republic. It has about 700 inhabitants.

Hvozd lies approximately 24 kilometres (15 mi) north-west of Prostějov, 26 km (16 mi) west of Olomouc, and 186 km (116 mi) east of Prague.

== Administrative division ==
Hvozd consists of four municipal parts (in brackets population according to the 2021 census):

- Hvozd (388)
- Klužínek (99)
- Otročkov (20)
- Vojtěchov (113)

== Demographics ==
Historical population
Year	Pop.	±%
1869	1,228	—
1880	1,290	+5.0%
1890	1,357	+5.2%
1900	1,274	−6.1%
1910	1,283	+0.7%
1921	1,292	+0.7%
1930	1,258	−2.6%
1950	932	−25.9%
1961	985	+5.7%
1970	855	−13.2%
1980	786	−8.1%
1991	669	−14.9%
2001	676	+1.0%
2011	611	−9.6%
2021	620	+1.5%
Source: Censuses
