= Radkov (Svitavy District) =

- Municipality
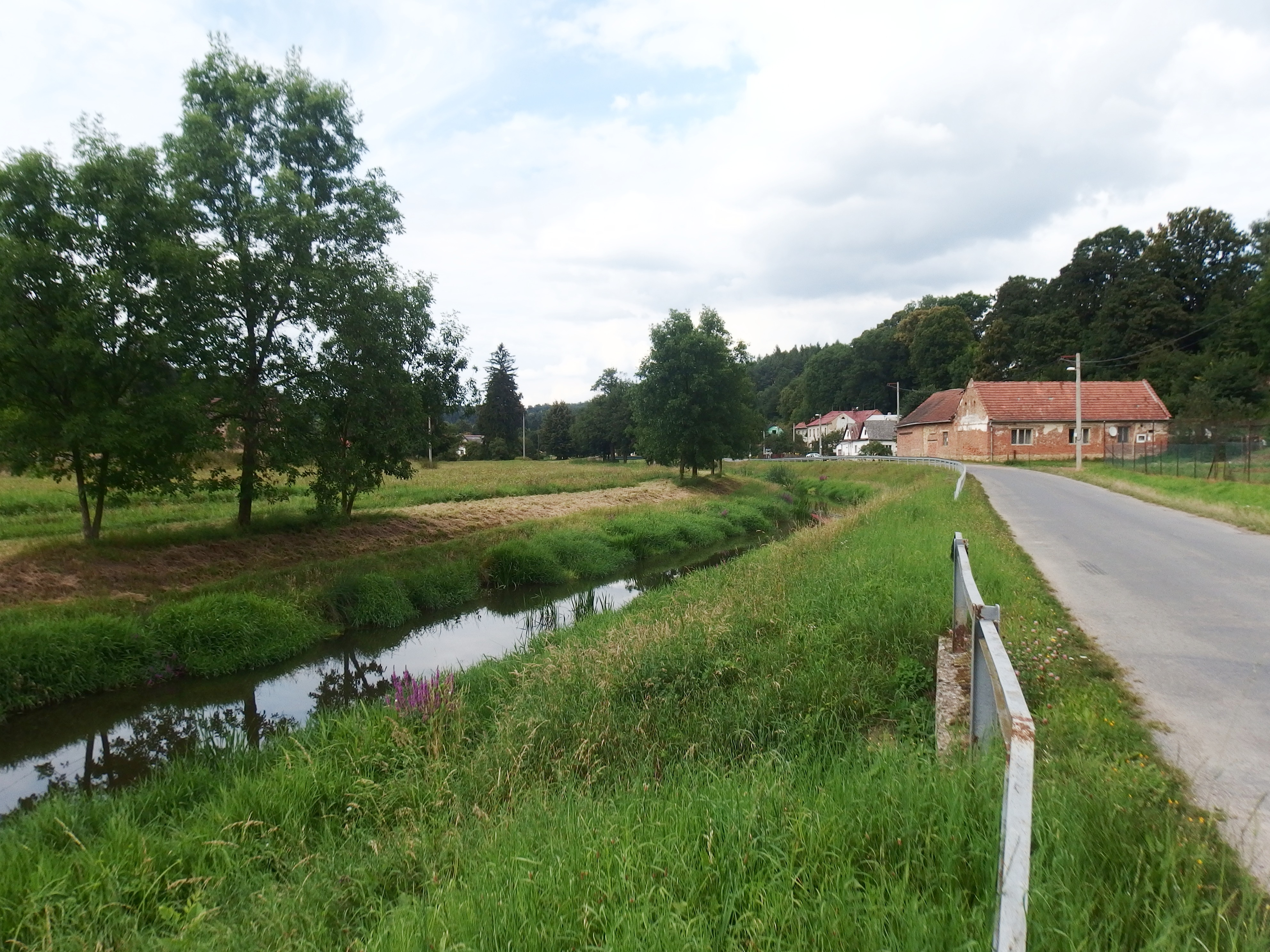
- Třebůvka River in Radkov

- Flag Coat of arms

- Location in the Czech Republic
- Coordinates: 49°44′0″N 16°44′31″E
- Country: Czech Republic
- Region: Pardubice
- District: Svitavy
- First mentioned: 1365

Area
  - Total: 6.64 km^{2} (2.56 sq mi)
- Elevation: 330 m (1,080 ft)

Population (2026-01-01)
  - Total: 114
  - Density: 17.2/km^{2} (44.5/sq mi)
- Time zone: UTC+1 (CET)
  - Summer (DST): UTC+2 (CEST)
- Postal code: 571 01
- Website: www.radkov-sy.cz

Radkov is a municipality and village in Svitavy District in the Pardubice Region of the Czech Republic. It has about 100 inhabitants.

Radkov lies approximately 21 kilometres (13 mi) east of Svitavy, 78 km (48 mi) south-east of Pardubice, and 172 km (107 mi) east of Prague.

== Demographics ==
Historical population
Year	Pop.	±%
1869	330	—
1880	397	+20.3%
1890	345	−13.1%
1900	318	−7.8%
1910	330	+3.8%
1921	303	−8.2%
1930	311	+2.6%
1950	198	−36.3%
1961	198	+0.0%
1970	161	−18.7%
1980	172	+6.8%
1991	150	−12.8%
2001	123	−18.0%
2011	119	−3.3%
2021	116	−2.5%
Source: Censuses
