= Hvozd (Rakovník District) =

- Municipality
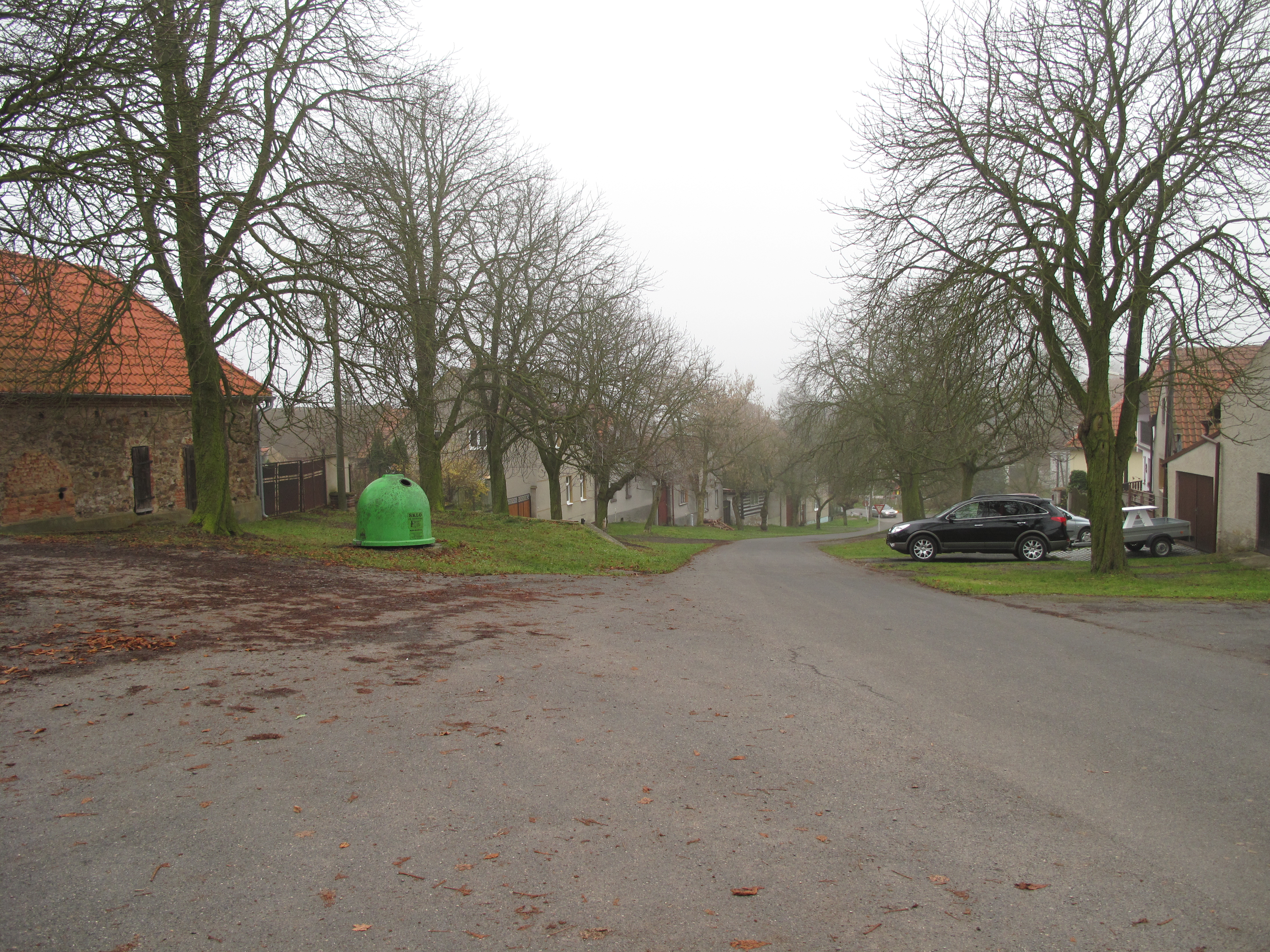
- Centre of Hvozd

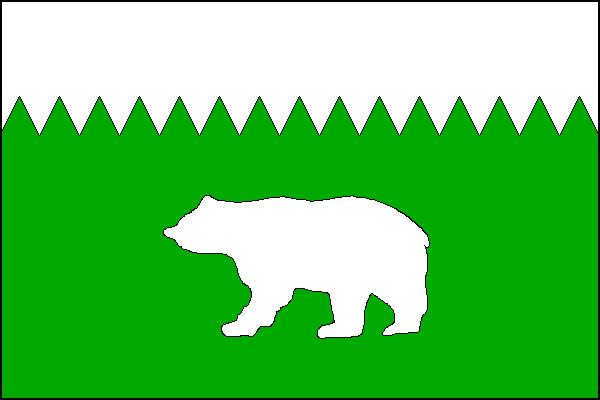
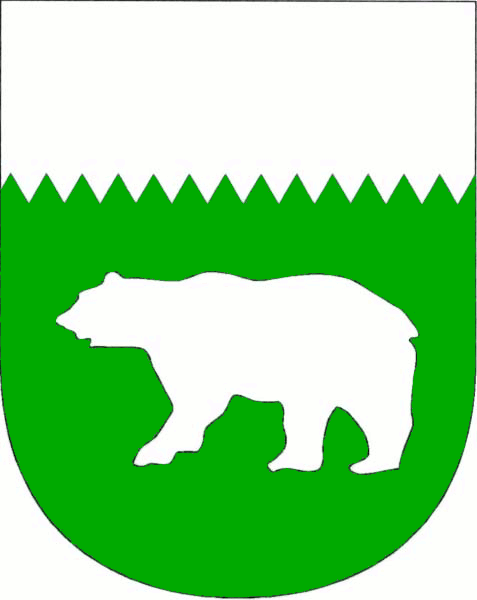
- Flag Coat of arms

- Location in the Czech Republic
- Coordinates: 50°3′6″N 13°41′54″E
- Country: Czech Republic
- Region: Central Bohemian
- District: Rakovník
- First mentioned: 1352

Area
  - Total: 3.68 km^{2} (1.42 sq mi)
- Elevation: 484 m (1,588 ft)

Population (2026-01-01)
  - Total: 179
  - Density: 48.6/km^{2} (126/sq mi)
- Time zone: UTC+1 (CET)
  - Summer (DST): UTC+2 (CEST)
- Postal code: 270 35
- Website: www.obec-hvozd.cz

Hvozd is a municipality and village in Rakovník District in the Central Bohemian Region of the Czech Republic. It has about 200 inhabitants.

== Administrative division ==
Hvozd consists of two municipal parts (in brackets population according to the 2021 census):

- Hvozd (98)
- Žďáry (46)

== Etymology ==
The word hvozd means 'forest' in Czech. The village was founded on the site of a forest or near a forest.

== Geography ==
Hvozd is located about 6 kilometres (4 mi) south of Rakovník and 45 km (28 mi) west of Prague. It lies in the Plasy Uplands. The highest point is the hill Nad Kostelem at 537 m (1,762 ft) above sea level.

== History ==
The first written mention of Hvozd is from 1352.

== Demographics ==
Historical population

Year	Pop.	±%
1869	306	—
1880	313	+2.3%
1890	293	−6.4%
1900	297	+1.4%
1910	297	+0.0%

Year	Pop.	±%
1921	310	+4.4%
1930	281	−9.4%
1950	224	−20.3%
1961	245	+9.4%
1970	226	−7.8%

Year	Pop.	±%
1980	196	−13.3%
1991	164	−16.3%
2001	148	−9.8%
2011	164	+10.8%
2021	144	−12.2%

Source: Censuses

== Transport ==
There are no railways or major roads passing through the municipality.

== Sights ==
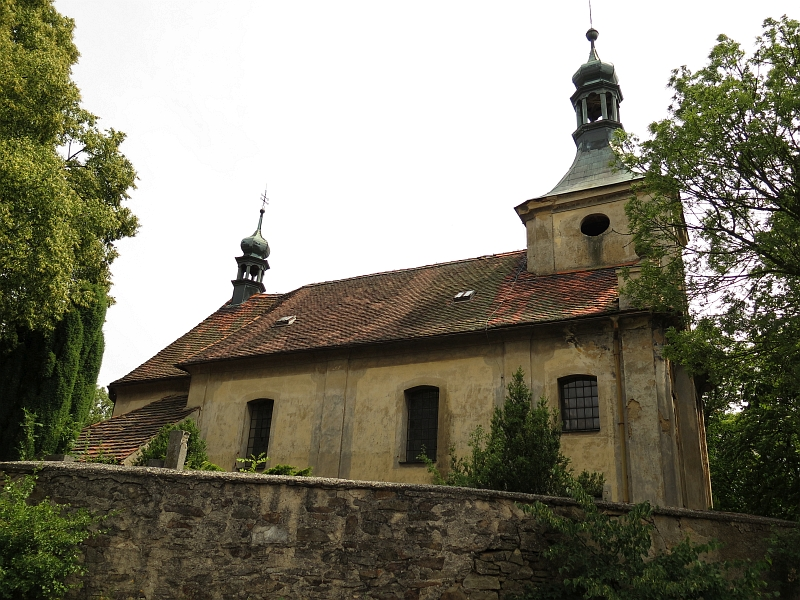
Church of Saint John the Baptist

The main landmark of Hvozd is the Church of Saint John the Baptist. It was built in the Baroque style on the site of an old medieval church.
