= Villers-Chemin-et-Mont-lès-Étrelles =

- Commune
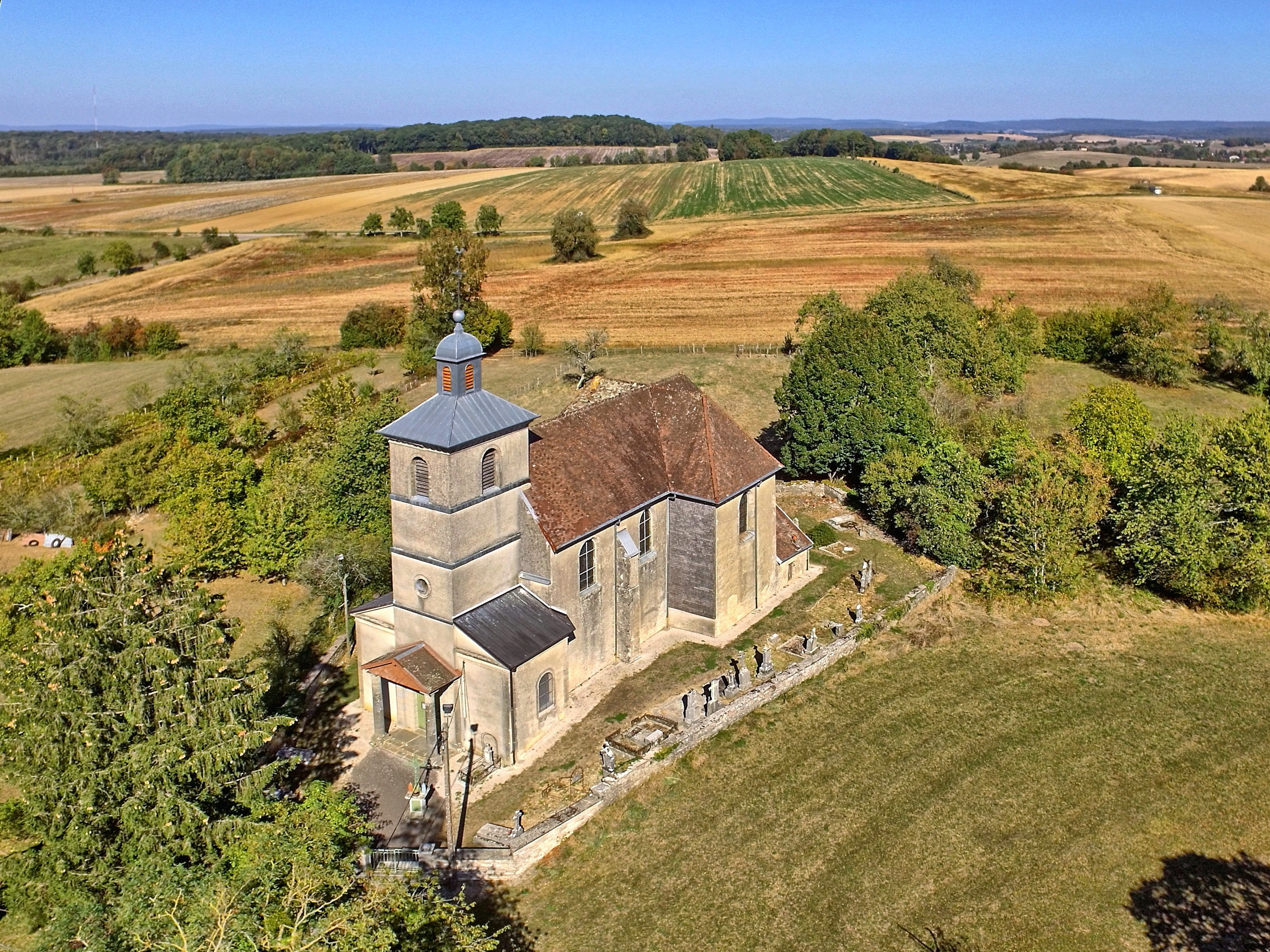
- The church in Mont-lès-Étrelles

- Coat of arms
- Location of Villers-Chemin-et-Mont-lès-Étrelles
- Location within France Location within Bourgogne-Franche-Comté
- Coordinates: 47°26′35″N 5°52′14″E
- Country: France
- Region: Bourgogne-Franche-Comté
- Department: Haute-Saône
- Arrondissement: Vesoul
- Canton: Marnay
- Area^{1}: 7.32 km^{2} (2.83 sq mi)
- Highest elevation: 377 m (1,237 ft)
- Lowest elevation: 238 m (781 ft)
- Population (2023): 124
  - Density: 16.9/km^{2} (43.9/sq mi)
- Time zone: UTC+01:00 (CET)
  - Summer (DST): UTC+02:00 (CEST)
- INSEE/Postal code: 70366 /70700
- ^{1} French Land Register data, which excludes lakes, ponds, glaciers > 1 km^{2} (0.386 sq mi or 247 acres) and river estuaries.

Villers-Chemin-et-Mont-lès-Étrelles is a commune in the Haute-Saône department in the region of Bourgogne-Franche-Comté in eastern France.

== See also ==
- Communes of the Haute-Saône department
