= Hvozdec (Beroun District) =

- Municipality
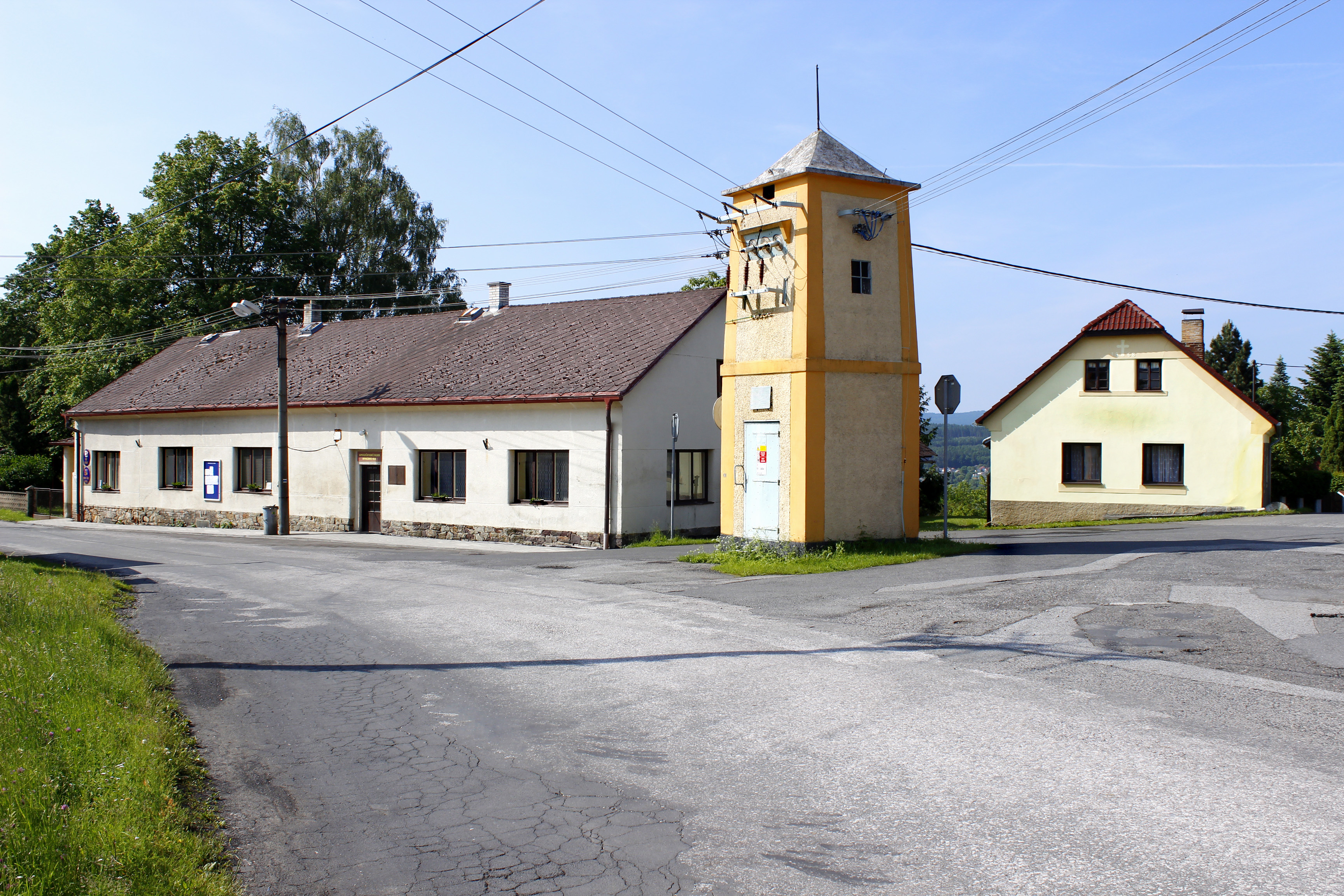
- Municipal office in the centre of Hvozdec

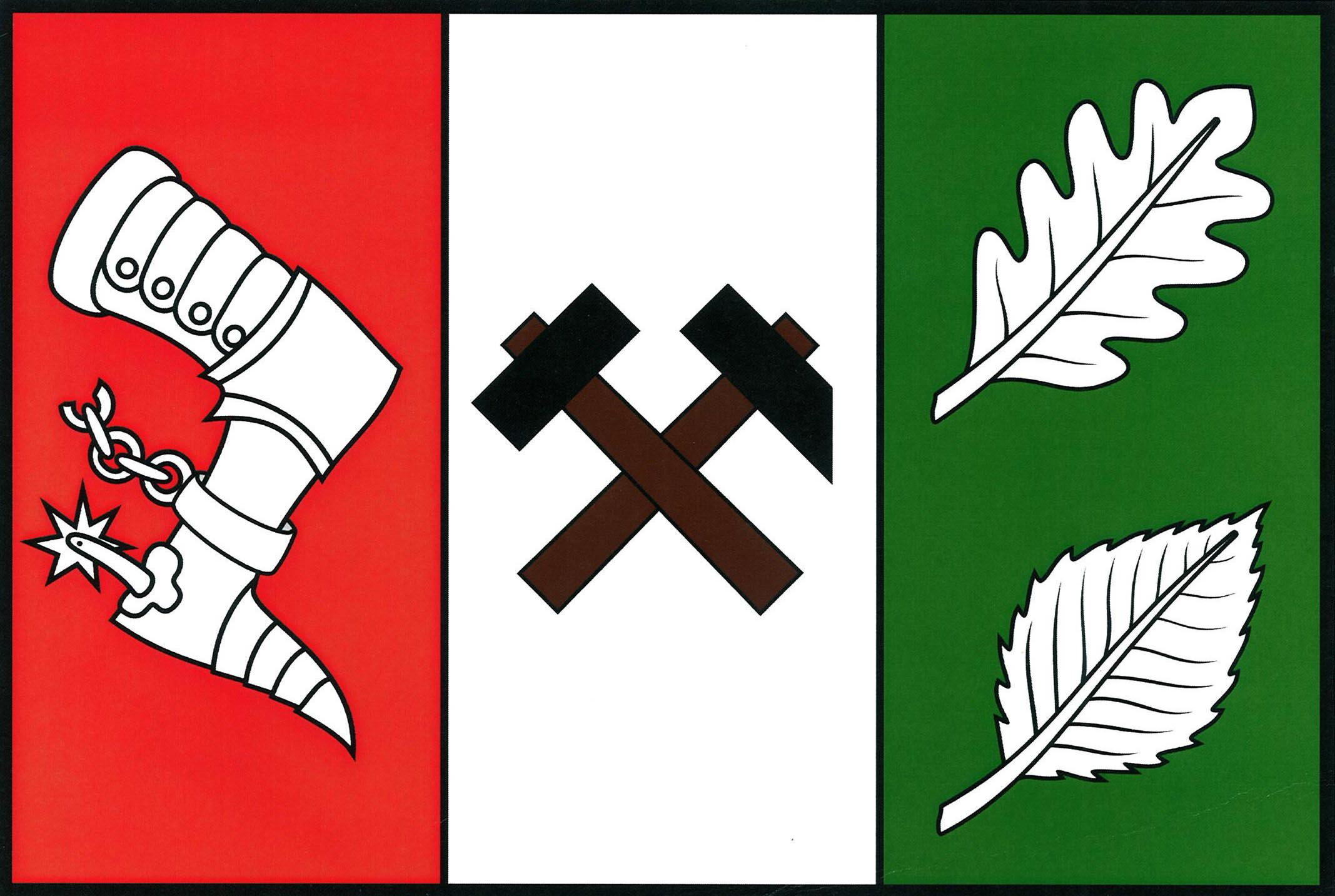
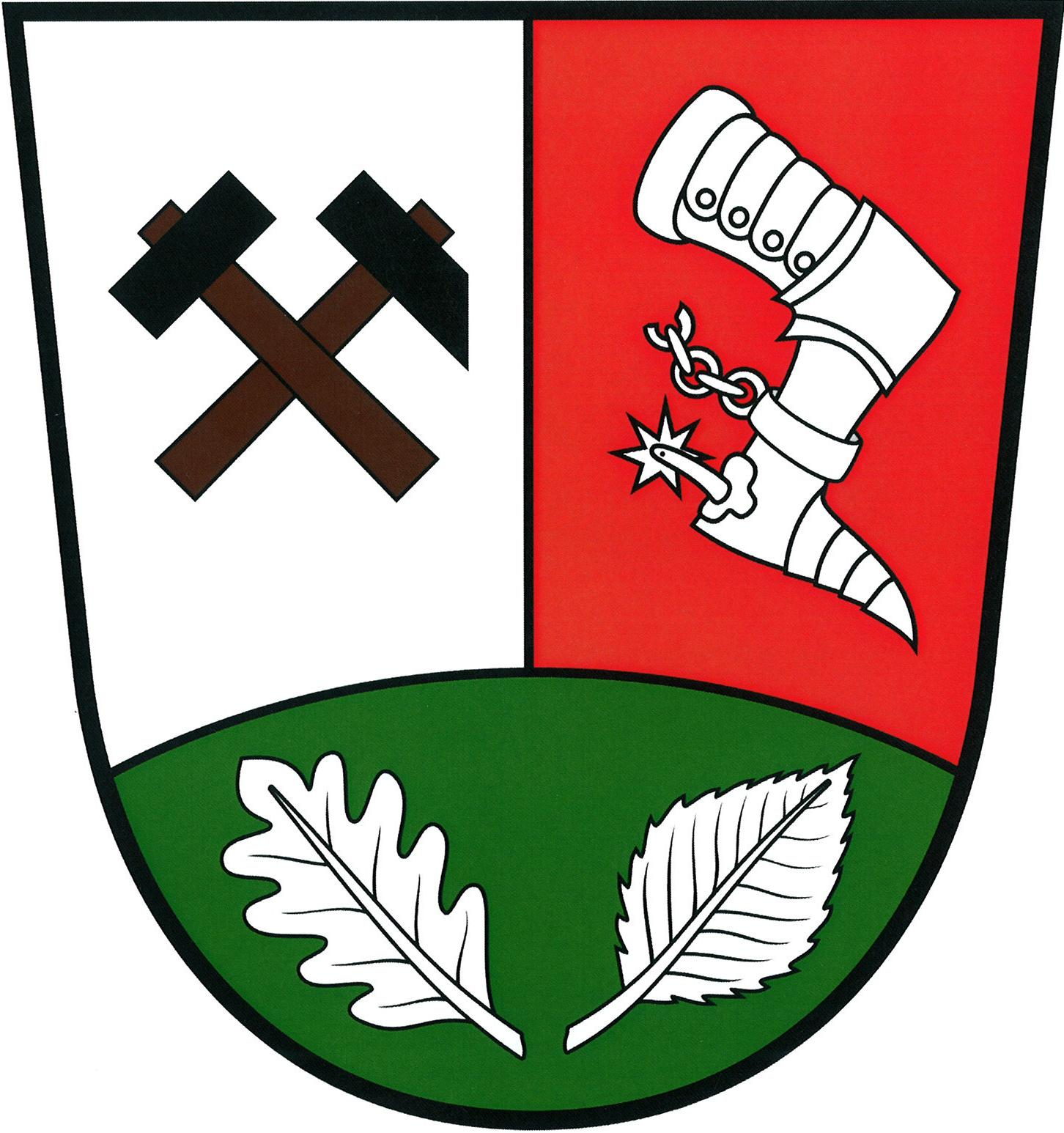
- Flag Coat of arms

- Location in the Czech Republic
- Coordinates: 49°48′26″N 13°52′49″E
- Country: Czech Republic
- Region: Central Bohemian
- District: Beroun
- First mentioned: 1543

Area
  - Total: 4.46 km^{2} (1.72 sq mi)
- Elevation: 516 m (1,693 ft)

Population (2026-01-01)
  - Total: 261
  - Density: 58.5/km^{2} (152/sq mi)
- Time zone: UTC+1 (CET)
  - Summer (DST): UTC+2 (CEST)
- Postal code: 267 62
- Website: www.obec-hvozdec.cz

Hvozdec is a municipality and village in Beroun District in the Central Bohemian Region of the Czech Republic. It has about 300 inhabitants.

Hvozdec is located about 22 kilometres (14 mi) southwest of Beroun and 50 km (31 mi) southwest of Prague.

== Administrative division ==
Hvozdec consists of two municipal parts (in brackets population according to the 2021 census):

- Hvozdec (198)
- Mrtník (59)

== History ==
The first written mention of Hvozdec is from 1543.

== Demographics ==
Historical population
Year	Pop.	±%
1869	510	—
1880	442	−13.3%
1890	476	+7.7%
1900	497	+4.4%
1910	511	+2.8%
1921	528	+3.3%
1930	508	−3.8%
1950	424	−16.5%
1961	403	−5.0%
1970	374	−7.2%
1980	292	−21.9%
1991	213	−27.1%
2001	214	+0.5%
2011	249	+16.4%
2021	257	+3.2%
Source: Censuses
