= Hvozd (Plzeň-North District) =

- Municipality
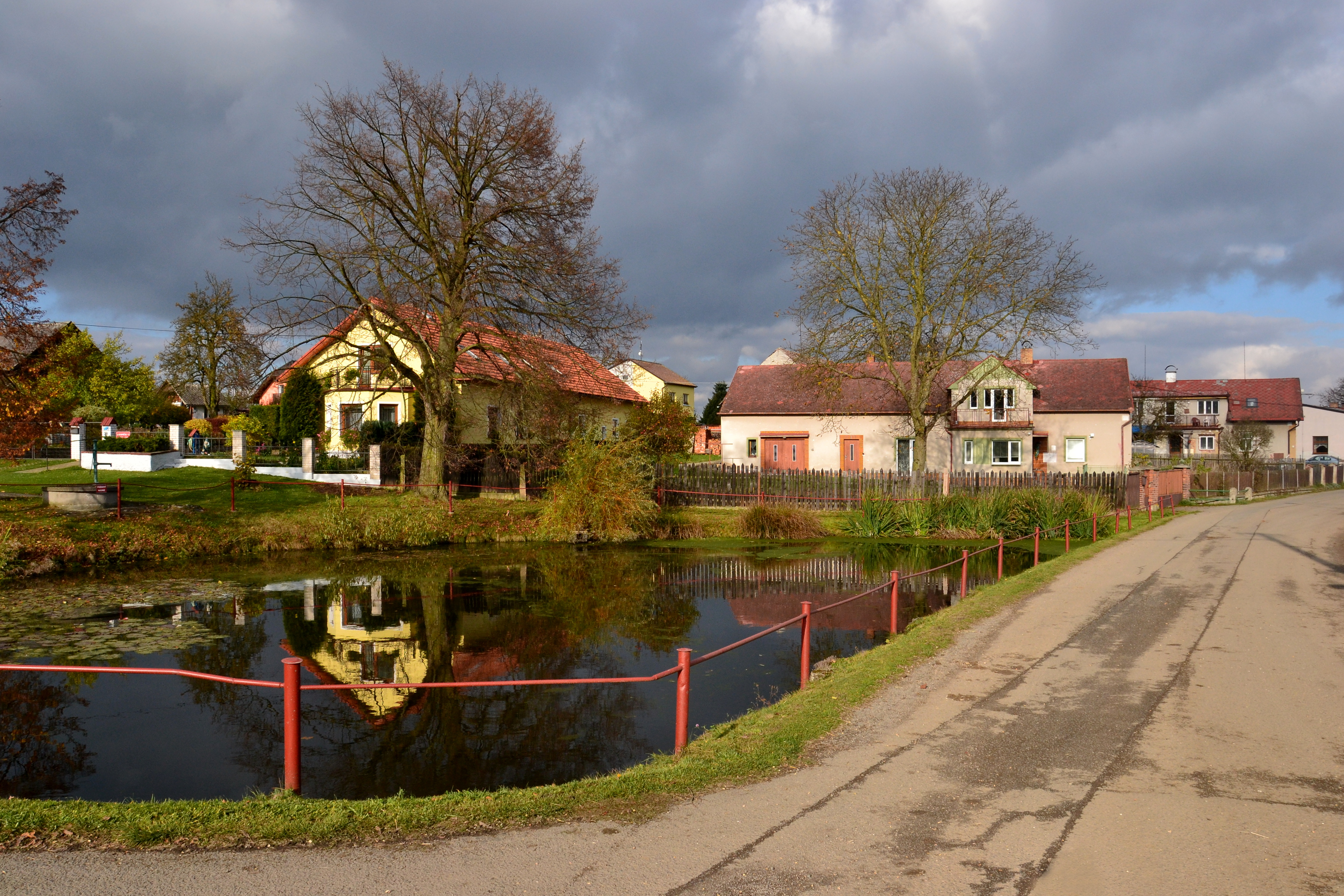
- Centre of Hvozd

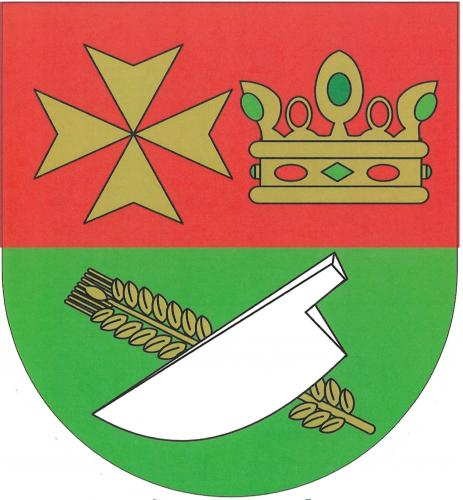
- Flag Coat of arms

- Location in the Czech Republic
- Coordinates: 49°56′23″N 13°15′47″E
- Country: Czech Republic
- Region: Plzeň
- District: Plzeň-North
- First mentioned: 1253

Area
  - Total: 11.08 km^{2} (4.28 sq mi)
- Elevation: 573 m (1,880 ft)

Population (2026-01-01)
  - Total: 261
  - Density: 23.6/km^{2} (61.0/sq mi)
- Time zone: UTC+1 (CET)
  - Summer (DST): UTC+2 (CEST)
- Postal code: 331 01
- Website: www.ou-hvozd.cz

Hvozd (German: Fosslau) is a municipality and village in Plzeň-North District in the Plzeň Region of the Czech Republic. It has about 300 inhabitants.

Hvozd lies approximately 23 kilometres (14 mi) north of Plzeň and 85 km (53 mi) west of Prague.

== Administrative division ==
Hvozd consists of two municipal parts (in brackets population according to the 2021 census):

- Hvozd (189)
- Hodoviz (60)

== Demographics ==
Historical population
Year	Pop.	±%
1869	416	—
1880	408	−1.9%
1890	397	−2.7%
1900	393	−1.0%
1910	353	−10.2%
1921	380	+7.6%
1930	379	−0.3%
1950	272	−28.2%
1961	273	+0.4%
1970	249	−8.8%
1980	272	+9.2%
1991	249	−8.5%
2001	246	−1.2%
2011	253	+2.8%
2021	249	−1.6%
Source: Censuses
