= Artistic Gymnastics World Championships =

International artistic gymnastics tournament

The Artistic Gymnastics World Championships are the world championships for artistic gymnastics governed by the Fédération Internationale de Gymnastique (FIG). The first edition of the championships was held in 1903, exclusively for male gymnasts. Since the tenth edition of the tournament, in 1934, women's events are held together with men's events.

The FIG was founded in 1881 and was originally entitled FEG (Fédération Européenne de Gymnastique), but changed its name in 1921, becoming the Fédération Internationale de Gymnastique (FIG); this name change roughly correlates with the actual naming of the World Championships. Although the first such games were held in 1903, they were not initially entitled the 'World Championships'. The first competition ever actually referred to as a 'World Championships' at the time was a competition held in 1931 that, while referred to in an official FIG publication as the "First Artistic Men's World Championships", often seems to go ignored by various authorities in the sport. The championships prior to the 1930s, beginning back in 1903, would eventually be recognized, retroactively, as the World Championships.

Although the FEG did not change its name into the FIG until 1921, and although what appears to have been the first non-European delegation to participate at a World Championships wasn't until Mexico sent a men's team that travelled all the way to compete at the 1934 Worlds in Budapest, a trans-Atlantic endeavor they repeated at the 1948 London Summer Olympics (a rare non-European delegation appearance even 14 years later), technically speaking, the transcontinental nature of the World Championships was present at the very first Worlds in 1903, as the all-around champion from those first Worlds was Joseph Martinez, a French-Algerian born in Oran. Additionally, repeat World All-Around Champion from 1909 and 1913, Marco Torres was also French-Algerian as he was born in Sidi Bel Abbès.

It was at those same 1934 World Championships in Budapest, which seems to have been the first World Championships with a non-European delegation, that there was finally the first-ever women's competition at a world championships, despite women having participated in various world championships since the first such international competition in 1903.

Perhaps the first African delegation was the Egyptian one which offered forth a full male team at the 1950 World Championships in Basel. By the time of these World Championships, a total of 60 male athletes from 6 countries and 53 female athletes from 7 countries comprised the competitive field. By the 2013 World Championships, the competition had grown to include 264 men from 71 countries and 134 women from 57 countries. As of 2023, over fifty editions of the championships have been staged, and over fifty countries have earned medals in artistic gymnastics events.

The most successful nation, both in gold medal results and total number of medals, is the former Soviet Union (not including medals from its successor states), and China is the second. The United States is the third most successful country in gold medal results while Japan is the third in total number of medals. Since the fall of the Iron Curtain, the traditional powerhouses in men's and women's individual still had expressive results: Russia, Belarus, Ukraine, China, United States, Japan, and Romania. The last two decades were marked by increasing results from two emerging powers: Great Britain and Brazil and at the same period a big decrease in results from Belarus, Romania and Ukraine. After a busy schedule and some tests which led to the holding of two separate world championships in 1994 (one for individual events and one for teams), it was decided that in each Olympic year the championship would not be held and that the edition held in the subsequent year of the Games, only the competition individual would be held. However, this cycle was broken in 2021, when the COVID-19 pandemic led to the 2020 Summer Olympics to be delayed by one year, the edition scheduled for that year was not cancelled. While the Games were held between July and August 2021, the World Championships was allocated to the end of the same year.

== Editions ==
Year	Edition	Host city	Country	Events (men/women)	First in the Medal Table	Second in the Medal Table	Third in the Medal Table
1903	1	Antwerp	Belgium	6 / 0	France	Luxembourg	Netherlands
1905	2	Bordeaux	France	5 / 0	France	Netherlands	Belgium
1907	3	Prague	Austria-Hungary	5 / 0	Czechoslovakia†	France	Belgium
1909	4	Luxembourg	Luxembourg	5 / 0	France	Italy	Czechoslovakia
1911	5	Turin	Italy	6 / 0	Czechoslovakia	Italy	France
1913	6	Paris	France	6 / 0	Italy	France	Czechoslovakia
1922	7	Ljubljana	Yugoslavia	6 / 0	Yugoslavia	Czechoslovakia	France
1926	8	Lyon	France	6 / 0	Czechoslovakia	Yugoslavia	France
1930	9	Luxembourg	Luxembourg	7 / 0	Yugoslavia	Czechoslovakia	Hungary
1931	Unnumbered††	Paris	France	6 / 0	Czechoslovakia	Finland Hungary Switzerland	—N/a
1934	10	Budapest	Hungary	8 / 2	Switzerland	Czechoslovakia	Germany
1938	11	Prague	Czechoslovakia	8 / 6	Czechoslovakia	Switzerland	Yugoslavia
1950	12	Basel	Switzerland	8 / 6	Switzerland	Poland	Sweden
1954	13	Rome	Italy	8 / 6	Soviet Union	Japan	Czechoslovakia
1958	14	Moscow	Soviet Union	8 / 6	Soviet Union	Japan	Czechoslovakia
1962	15	Prague	Czechoslovakia	8 / 6	Soviet Union	Japan	Czechoslovakia
1966	16	Dortmund	West Germany	8 / 6	Soviet Union	Japan	Czechoslovakia
1970	17	Ljubljana	SFR Yugoslavia	8 / 6	Japan	Soviet Union	East Germany
1974	18	Varna	Bulgaria	8 / 6	Soviet Union	Japan	East Germany
1978	19	Strasbourg	France	8 / 6	Soviet Union	Japan	United States
1979	20	Fort Worth	United States	8 / 6	Soviet Union	United States	Romania
1981	21	Moscow	Soviet Union	8 / 6	Soviet Union	East Germany	China
1983	22	Budapest	Hungary	8 / 6	Soviet Union	China	Romania
1985	23	Montreal	Canada	8 / 6	Soviet Union	China	East Germany
1987	24	Rotterdam	Netherlands	8 / 6	Soviet Union	Romania	China
1989	25	Stuttgart	West Germany	8 / 6	Soviet Union	Romania	China
1991	26	Indianapolis	United States	8 / 6	Soviet Union	China	Romania
1992	27	Paris	France	6 / 4	CIS	China	United States
1993	28	Birmingham	Great Britain	7 / 5	Belarus	United States	Romania
1994	29	Brisbane	Australia	7 / 5	Belarus	Romania	China United States
1994	30	Dortmund	Germany	1 / 1	China Romania	—N/a	Russia
1995	31	Sabae	Japan	8 / 6	China	Ukraine	Romania
1996	32	San Juan	Puerto Rico	6 / 4	Russia	Romania	Belarus
1997	33	Lausanne	Switzerland	8 / 6	Romania	Russia	China
1999	34	Tianjin	China	8 / 6	Russia	China	Romania
2001	35	Ghent	Belgium	8 / 6	Romania	Russia	Bulgaria
2002	36	Debrecen	Hungary	6 / 4	Romania	China	United States
2003	37	Anaheim	United States	8 / 6	China	United States	Japan
2005	38	Melbourne	Australia	7 / 5	United States	China	Slovenia
2006	39	Aarhus	Denmark	8 / 6	China	Romania	Australia
2007	40	Stuttgart	Germany	8 / 6	China	United States	Germany
2009	41	London	Great Britain	7 / 5	China	United States	Romania
2010	42	Rotterdam	Netherlands	8 / 6	China	Russia	United States
2011	43	Tokyo	Japan	8 / 6	China	United States	Russia
2013	44	Antwerp	Belgium	7 / 5	Japan	United States	China
2014	45	Nanning	China	8 / 6	United States	China	North Korea
2015	46	Glasgow	Great Britain	8 / 6	United States	Japan	Russia
2017	47	Montreal	Canada	7 / 5	China	Japan	Russia
2018	48	Doha	Qatar	8 / 6	United States	China	Russia
2019	49	Stuttgart	Germany	8 / 6	United States	Russia	Great Britain
2021	50	Kitakyushu	Japan	7 / 5	China	Japan	Italy
2022	51	Liverpool	Great Britain	8 / 6	United States	China	Japan
2023	52	Antwerp	Belgium	8 / 6	United States	Japan	China
2025	53	Jakarta	Indonesia	7 / 5	China	Japan	United States
2026	54	Rotterdam	Netherlands	8 / 6	United States	China	Japan
2027	55	Chengdu	China	8 / 6	Future event		
2029	56	TBD			Future event		
2030	57	Liverpool	Great Britain	8 / 6	Future event		

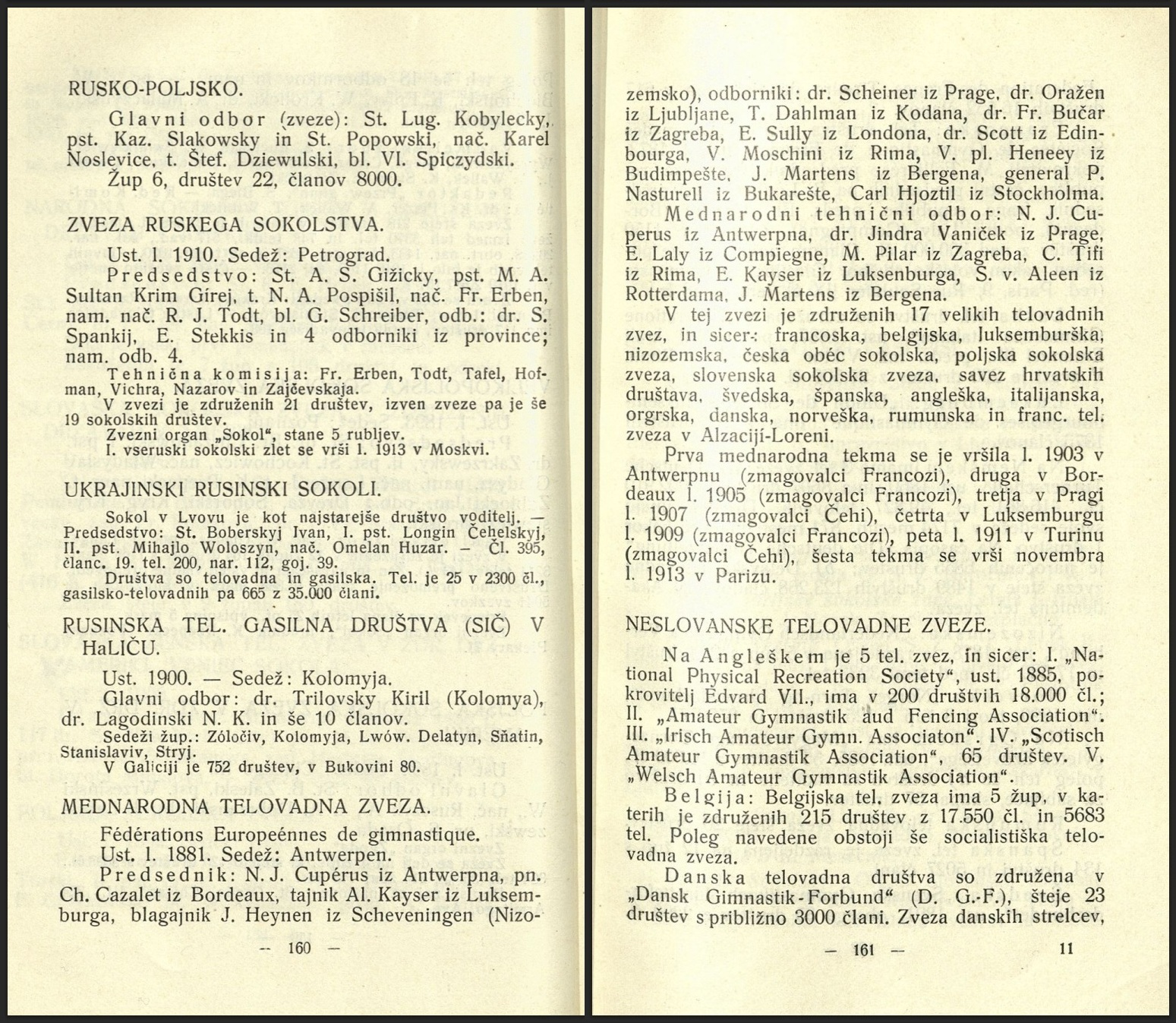
These two pages from a 1912 Slovenian publication provide an early, pre-WWI accounting of basic information relating to the BFEG (the precursor to the FIG/World Gymnastics) and help reinforce an information infrastructure, about the further-back history of the sport of gymnastics, that has been compromised. In an article in a special issue of the peer-reviewed The International Journal of the History of Sport entitled "The Genesis of the International Sports Federations before 1914", it is stated that the "BFEG’s official archives appear to have been lost" and that the "FIG’s archives, kept at its head office in Lausanne, do not contain documents from before the 1950s." Additionally, it is stated therein "Despite inquiries to the Kingdom of Belgium’s general archives and the cities of Ghent (Belgian Liberal Archives) and Liège (the city where the BFEG was founded), it proved impossible to find records specifically relating to the BFEG." This 1912 Slovenian publication lists, on page 161, the years and locations of the first 6 editions of the games, including the men’s team champions of the first 5 (as the 6th had not yet occurred), beginning with the 1903 edition in Antwerp about which the FIG stated "this meet is recognised as the first Worlds." The website Gymnastics-History.com, in an article dedicated to the 1938 World Championships, replicates an image that shows that those 1938 World Championships were designated as the 11th, (the original title in Czech reads "XI. Závody Mezinárodní Tělocvičné Federace" (XI. International Gymnastics Federation Competitions)), suggestively and consistently upholding the canonizing and numbering established for the first 6 pre-World War editions, as well as the 7th (1922), 8th (1926), 9th (1930), and 10th (1934). Among World Gymnastics’s "Historical Documents", in their 100 year historical treatment from 1981, this canonizing and numbering of the pre-WWI championships, which belong to what has been termed the "Heroic Stage" (1896-1920) of the sport, was repeated yet again, as it was also in their 125 year historical treatment from 2006. As recently as 2014, in an article presenting a synopsis of the first 110 years of the World Championships in the peer-reviewed journal Science of Gymnastics Journal, the canonizing and numbering of these pre-WWI games has been upheld.

† The FIG (now World Gymnastics) in their 125-year anniversary publication, whereas pre-World War I editions of these championships are concerned, credits the teams and athletes from the Bohemian/Czech lands, then part of Austria-Hungary, as belonging to Czechoslovakia. (Additionally, therein, they also credit the athletes from Slovenia, then also part of Austria-Hungary, as belonging to Yugoslavia.)

†† There seems to be a history of inconsistency from the FIG's publications regarding whether these 1931 games are considered to be a World Championships. About these games, it is written in their 100-year Anniversary publication from 1981, that Following "agreements, objections, and discussions" this manifestation was called "World Championships", however on the following page of that same publication, it is stated "Logically, the manifestations of the 50th anniversary of the FIG cannot be placed among the official competitions". Additionally, in the FIG's 125-year Anniversary Publication from 2006, it is said about these games "Premiers concours sous l'appellation Championnats du Monde de Gymnastique artistique masculine a Paris", yet they were referred to as "unofficial" and their results were omitted from the results section of that book. As it currently stands (as of as recently as 2021), about these games in 1931, the FIG states "1931 [-] First Artistic Men's World Championships held in Paris."

== All-time medal table ==
Last updated after the 2026 World Championships.

Early events such as the 1913 and 1911 championships were purely team events without any individual awards, individual scores were only introduced in 1922, with the first all-round individual men's champion being recognised in that year. Similarly the first women's championship in 1934 only had medals being awarded to teams, not individuals. Individual "medals" for these events were therefore only recognised retrospectively and weren't awarded at the time. Similarly, until 1921 FIG was known as the European Gymnastics Federation (FEG) and its events were not world championships as such.

Conversely, contemporaneous coverage of select World Championships prior to World War I exists both in the pages of “Slovenski Sokol” magazine (via the Digital Library of Slovenia) and in reproductions of apparently original and contemporaneous Czech source materials (via Gymnastics-History.com) for both the 3rd (1907) and 6th (1913) World Championships. In the Czech versions of those sources, reproduced by Gymnastics-History.com, both individual all-around scores and apparatus scores are presented for every competitor, and in the Slovenian versions of those sources, individual all-around scores and rankings are reproduced for the top 14 and very last-place competitor for the 1907 Worlds and for every competitor at the 1913 Worlds. Additionally, all of the data that is presented in each of those sources completely matches the data that both the FIG and USAG (the official governing body of the sport of Artistic gymnastics within the USA) present in their respective treatments on the results of these pre-WWI World Championships, with the sole two exceptions of the horizontal bar placing of French Gymnast Francois Vidal and the parallel bars placement of Belgian gymnast Paul Mangin, both at the 1907 World Championships. (In any event, all of these data sources - the Slovenian records, the Gymnastics-History.com's reproduced Czech records, the FIG's records, and the USAG's records - have continually failed to recognize the apparent original human error with respect to the discrepancy between Vidal's and Mangin's scores and rankings. In light of that, all of these data sources remain completely consistent, in terms of the data that they do present, with respect to the results of the pre-WWI editions of these World Championships.)

Additionally, for the very first World Championships (1934) with an official women's competition, the FIG officially recognizes all-around medalists, and singles out the champion ( Vlasta Děkanová ) as having "won the general competition [there]…and [at the] 1938 World Championships", and in original contemporaneous coverage, the Slovenian newspaper Sokolski Glasnik photographically singled Děkanová out as the champion of those 1934 World Championships.

Additionally, in lieu of an article published in the 10 June 2024 issue of The International Journal of the History of Sport (a peer-reviewed journal) claiming that the BFEG's (the FIG's predecessor) archives from before 1950 appear to have been lost, a brief biographical treatment containing a photograph of multiple medals belonging to 1911 World All-Around Champion Ferdinand Steiner on the website of an alma mater of his, the Jiří Wolkera Gymnasium, shows multiple medals with the words "Concorso Ginnastico Internazionale 1911 Torino" embossed onto them. This brief biographical treatment was published at least as far back as 14 January 2017 on the official Facebook website of his alma mater in a photograph album, begun on 29 November 2016, containing other such brief biographical treatments of its notable alumni. That pictoral presentation of Steiner's medals helps suggest that individual medals were awarded for those 1911 World Championships as they were from the same locale and year as the 1911 Worlds, and with the original title of the competition being printed on those medals, this further helps suggest that these individual medals were awarded contemporaneously.

=== Men's events ===
Rank	Nation	Gold	Silver	Bronze	Total
1	China	73	39	32	144
2	Soviet Union	61	46	31	138
3	Japan	53	59	61	173
4	France	25	29	20	74
5	Switzerland	19	15	15	49
6	Czechoslovakia	18	16	14	48
7	Yugoslavia	17	9	8	34
8	Italy	14	10	23	47
9	Russia ^{[g]}	13	22	16	51
10	United States	13	12	17	42
11	Romania	12	9	5	26
12	Belarus	12	7	11	30
13	Bohemia ^{[a]}	10	8	10	28
14	Hungary	9	10	5	24
15	Great Britain	7	13	8	28
16	Greece	7	4	2	13
17	Germany	6	9	12	27
18	East Germany	6	6	14	26
19	South Korea	6	2	3	11
20	North Korea	6	0	2	8
21	Netherlands	5	5	2	12
22	CIS ^{[c]}	5	2	3	10
23	Ukraine	4	9	15	28
24	Bulgaria	4	6	11	21
25	Brazil	4	4	3	11
26	Slovenia	3	4	0	7
27	Armenia	3	2	4	9
28	Philippines	3	2	3	8
29	Finland	2	5	2	9
30	West Germany	2	5	1	8
31	Spain	2	3	1	6
32	Turkey	2	2	0	4
33	Ireland	2	0	1	3
34	Croatia	1	4	1	6
35	Israel	1	2	4	7
36	Australia	1	2	2	5
36	Poland	1	2	2	5
38	Chinese Taipei	1	2	1	4
39	Luxembourg	1	0	4	5
40	Kazakhstan	1	0	1	2
41	Belgium	0	4	4	8
42	Canada	0	3	4	7
43	Cuba	0	2	2	4
44	Latvia	0	2	1	3
45	Austria-Hungary ^{[b]}	0	1	1	2
45	Jordan	0	1	1	2
47	Mexico	0	1	0	1
48	Azerbaijan	0	0	1	1
48	Norway	0	0	1	1
48	Puerto Rico	0	0	1	1
48	Russian Gymnastics Federation ^{[e]}	0	0	1	1
48	Sweden	0	0	1	1
48	Uzbekistan	0	0	1	1
–	Individual Neutral Athletes ^{[f]}	0	0	1	1
–	Unattached athlete ^{[d]}	0	0	1	1
Total		435	400	391	1226

=== Women's events ===
Rank	Nation	Gold	Silver	Bronze	Total
1	United States	58	47	34	139
2	Soviet Union	50	40	28	118
3	Romania	36	36	37	109
4	China	25	24	21	70
5	Russia ^{[g]}	23	23	22	68
6	Czechoslovakia	16	13	6	35
7	East Germany	11	7	15	33
8	Japan	6	3	13	22
9	Brazil	5	5	6	16
10	Great Britain	4	3	7	14
11	Poland	4	0	7	11
12	Ukraine	3	4	5	12
13	Algeria	3	2	0	5
14	Sweden	3	1	1	5
15	Hungary	2	5	3	10
16	North Korea	2	3	1	6
–	Individual Neutral Athletes ^{[f]}	2	1	0	3
17	Belgium	2	0	2	4
18	Belarus	2	0	0	2
19	Italy	1	3	6	10
20	Germany	1	3	4	8
21	Australia	1	2	2	5
21	Uzbekistan	1	2	2	5
23	Austria	1	1	1	3
23	Russian Gymnastics Federation ^{[e]}	1	1	1	3
25	Bulgaria	1	0	2	3
26	Spain	1	0	1	2
27	Canada	0	5	2	7
28	Netherlands	0	3	1	4
29	Yugoslavia	0	2	0	2
30	France	0	1	8	9
31	CIS ^{[c]}	0	1	2	3
32	Switzerland	0	1	1	2
33	Cuba	0	0	1	1
33	Mexico	0	0	1	1
33	South Korea	0	0	1	1
33	Vietnam	0	0	1	1
Total		265	242	245	752

=== Overall ===
Rank	Nation	Gold	Silver	Bronze	Total
1	Soviet Union	111	86	59	256
2	China	98	63	53	214
3	United States	71	59	51	181
4	Japan	59	62	74	195
5	Romania	48	45	42	135
6	Russia ^{[g]}	36	45	38	119
7	Czechoslovakia	34	29	20	83
8	France	25	30	28	83
9	Switzerland	19	16	16	51
10	East Germany	17	13	29	59
11	Yugoslavia	17	11	8	36
12	Italy	15	13	29	57
13	Belarus	14	7	11	32
14	(United Kingdom) Great Britain	11	16	15	42
15	Hungary	11	15	8	34
16	Bohemia ^{[a]}	10	8	10	28
17	Brazil	9	9	9	27
18	North Korea	8	3	3	14
19	Ukraine	7	13	20	40
20	Germany	7	12	16	35
21	Greece	7	4	2	13
22	South Korea	6	2	4	12
23	Netherlands	5	8	3	16
24	Bulgaria	5	6	13	24
25	(Commonwealth of Independent States) CIS ^{[c]}	5	3	5	13
26	Poland	5	2	9	16
27	Slovenia	3	4	0	7
28	Spain	3	3	2	8
29	Armenia	3	2	4	9
30	Philippines	3	2	3	8
31	Algeria	3	2	0	5
32	Sweden	3	1	2	6
33	Finland	2	5	2	9
34	West Germany	2	5	1	8
35	Belgium	2	4	6	12
36	Australia	2	4	4	10
37	Turkey	2	2	0	4
–	Individual Neutral Athletes ^{[f]}	2	1	1	4
38	Ireland	2	0	1	3
39	Croatia	1	4	1	6
40	Israel	1	2	4	7
41	Uzbekistan	1	2	3	6
42	Chinese Taipei	1	2	1	4
43	Russian Gymnastics Federation ^{[e]}	1	1	2	4
44	Austria	1	1	1	3
45	Luxembourg	1	0	4	5
46	Kazakhstan	1	0	1	2
47	Canada	0	8	6	14
48	Cuba	0	2	3	5
49	Latvia	0	2	1	3
50	Austria-Hungary ^{[b]}	0	1	1	2
50	Jordan	0	1	1	2
50	Mexico	0	1	1	2
53	Azerbaijan	0	0	1	1
53	Norway	0	0	1	1
53	Puerto Rico	0	0	1	1
53	Vietnam	0	0	1	1
–	Unattached athlete ^{[d]}	0	0	1	1
Totals (56 entries)		700	642	636	1,978

Notes

- ^[a] Official FIG documents credit medals earned by athletes from Bohemia as medals for Czechoslovakia.
- ^[b] Official FIG documents credit medals earned by athletes from Austria-Hungary as medals for Yugoslavia.
- ^[c] Official FIG documents credit medals earned by athletes from the former Soviet Union at the 1992 World Artistic Gymnastics Championships in Paris, France, as medals for "CEI" (or the CIS (Commonwealth of Independent States)).
- ^[d] At the 1993 World Artistic Gymnastics Championships in Birmingham, Great Britain, Azerbaijani-born athlete Valery Belenky earned a bronze medal competing as an unattached athlete (UNA) because Azerbaijan did not have a gymnastics federation for him to compete. Later, official FIG documents credit his medal as a medal for Germany.
- ^[e] At the 2021 World Artistic Gymnastics Championships in Kitakyushu, Japan, in accordance with a ban by the World Anti-Doping Agency (WADA) and a decision by the Court of Arbitration for Sport (CAS), athletes from Russia were not permitted to use the Russian name, flag, or anthem. They instead participated under name and flag of the RGF (Russian Gymnastics Federation).
- ^[f] At the 2025 World Artistic Gymnastics Championships in Jakarta, Indonesia, in accordance with sanctions imposed following by the 2022 Russian invasion of Ukraine, athletes from Russia were not permitted to use the name, flag, or anthem of Russia. They instead participated as "Individual Neutral Athletes (AIN)", their medals were not included in the official medal table.
- ^[g] At the 2026 World Artistic Gymnastics Championships in Rotterdam, Netherlands, due to regulations by the Dutch authorities, athletes from Russia were not permitted to use the name, flag, or anthem of Russia. They instead participated under name and flag of "World Gymnastics 2" (WG2). However, World Gymnastics officially credit medals earned by Russian athletes at these championships as medals for Russia.

== Statistics ==
=== Multiple gold medalists ===
Boldface denotes active artistic gymnasts and highest medal count among all artistic gymnasts (including those not included in these tables) per type.

==== Men ====
===== All events =====
Rank	Artistic gymnast	Country	From	To	Gold	Silver	Bronze	Total
1	Vitaly Scherbo	Soviet Union; CIS; Belarus	1991	1996	**12**	7	4	**23**
2	Kōhei Uchimura	Japan	2009	2018	10	6	5	21
3	Joseph Martinez	France	1903	1909	10	1	–	11
4	Yuri Korolyov	Soviet Union	1981	1987	9	3	1	13
5	Dmitry Bilozerchev	Soviet Union	1983	1987	8	4	–	12
6	Li Xiaopeng	China	1997	2005	8	2	1	11
7	Marian Drăgulescu	Romania	2001	2015	8	2	–	10
8	Chen Yibing	China	2006	2011	8	–	–	8
9	**Daiki Hashimoto**	Japan	2019	2026	7	6	1	14
10	Eizō Kenmotsu	Japan	1970	1979	7	5	3	15

===== Individual events =====
Rank	Artistic gymnast	Country	From	To	Gold	Silver	Bronze	Total
1	Vitaly Scherbo	Soviet Union; CIS; Belarus	1991	1996	**11**	**7**	**4**	**22**
2	Kōhei Uchimura	Japan	2009	2018	9	3	**4**	16
3	Marian Drăgulescu	Romania	2001	2015	8	2	–	10
4	Dmitry Bilozerchev	Soviet Union	1983	1987	7	3	–	10
5	Joseph Martinez	France	1903	1909	7	1	–	8
6	Yuri Korolyov	Soviet Union	1981	1987	6	2	1	9
7	**Daiki Hashimoto**	Japan	2021	2026	5	5	–	10
8	Eugen Mack	Switzerland	1934	1938	5	3	1	9
9	Alois Hudec *	Czechoslovakia	1931	1938	5	3	–	8
9	Marco Torrès	France	1909	1913	5	3	–	8

Note

* Alois Hudec of Czechoslovakia won 3 individual gold medals at the commemorative competition which was held in Paris, France, in 1931 and referred to as the "First Artistic Men's World Championships". However, as stated before there has been a history of inconsistency from the FIG's publications as to the recognition of the official or unofficial status of this event. Without the medals he won at this competition, Hudec would not occupy a place on this Top 10 list, however he did win these medals in a competitive field that included no fewer than 7 other gymnasts who either already were or would later become World All-Around Champions or Olympic All-Around Champions or unawarded 1st place finishers at such competitions.

==== Women ====
===== All events =====
Rank	Artistic gymnast	Country	From	To	Gold	Silver	Bronze	Total
1	**Simone Biles**	United States	2013	2023	**23**	4	3	**30**
2	Svetlana Khorkina	Russia	1994	2003	9	**8**	3	20
3	Gina Gogean	Romania	1993	1997	9	2	4	15
4	Larisa Latynina (Diriy)	Soviet Union	1954	1966	9	4	1	14
5	Ludmilla Tourischeva	Soviet Union	1970	1974	7	2	2	11
6	Daniela Silivaș	Romania	1985	1989	7	2	1	10
7	Simona Amânar	Romania	1994	1999	6	4	–	10
8	Nellie Kim	Soviet Union	1974	1979	5	4	2	11
8	Yelena Shushunova	Soviet Union	1985	1987	5	4	2	11
10	Lavinia Miloșovici	Romania	1991	1996	5	3	5	13

===== Individual events =====
Rank	Artistic gymnast	Country	From	To	Gold	Silver	Bronze	Total
1	**Simone Biles**	United States	2013	2023	**18**	4	3	**25**
2	Svetlana Khorkina	Russia	1994	2003	9	5	2	16
3	Gina Gogean	Romania	1993	1997	6	2	4	12
4	Larisa Latynina	Soviet Union	1958	1962	6	3	1	10
5	Daniela Silivaș	Romania	1985	1989	6	–	1	7
6	Ludmilla Tourischeva	Soviet Union	1970	1974	5	2	2	9
7	Maxi Gnauck	East Germany	1979	1983	5	1	–	6
7	Shannon Miller	United States	1991	1994	5	1	–	6
9	**Rebeca Andrade**	Brazil	2021	2026	4	3	2	9
9	Yelena Shushunova	Soviet Union	1985	1987	4	3	2	9

Note

Few non-primary sources state that at the 1938 World Artistic Gymnastics Championships, in Prague, Vlasta Děkanová of Czechoslovakia won 2 or 3 golds on multiple apparatuses. According to some sources, Děkanová and her compatriot Matylda Pálfyová shared gold medals in parallel bars (this event was replaced with uneven bars in the women's program at all subsequent world championships), while others state that Pálfyová shared this victory with Polish gymnast Marta Majowska, not Děkanová. The only primary source on the subject, a book officially released by the International Gymnastics Federation containing the results of the World Championships from 1903 to 2005, informs that medals were distributed only in the team all-around event and in the individual all-around event. Therefore, according to official reports, Děkanová's official number of gold medals is four, two in individual all-round (1934 and 1938) and two in team events (1934 and 1938) - not six or seven.

== Best results of top nations by event ==
=== Men's results ===
Only nations with medals in five or more events are listed. Positions below third place are not taken into account. Results for Germany and West Germany have been combined.

Event	(Belgium) BEL	(Belarus) BLR	(Bohemia) BOH	(Bulgaria) BUL	(China) CHN	(Commonwealth of Independent States) CIS	(Finland) FIN	(France) FRA	(United Kingdom) GBR	(East Germany) GDR	(Germany) GER	(Italy) ITA	(Japan) JPN	(Romania) ROU	(Russia) RUS	(Switzerland) SUI	(Czechoslovakia) TCH	(Ukraine) UKR	(Soviet Union) URS	(United States) USA	(Socialist Federal Republic of Yugoslavia) YUG
Team	2nd place, silver medalist(s)	1st place, gold medalist(s)	1st place, gold medalist(s)	–	1st place, gold medalist(s)	–	2nd place, silver medalist(s)	1st place, gold medalist(s)	2nd place, silver medalist(s)	2nd place, silver medalist(s)	3rd place, bronze medalist(s)	3rd place, bronze medalist(s)	1st place, gold medalist(s)	3rd place, bronze medalist(s)	1st place, gold medalist(s)	1st place, gold medalist(s)	1st place, gold medalist(s)	3rd place, bronze medalist(s)	1st place, gold medalist(s)	2nd place, silver medalist(s)	2nd place, silver medalist(s)
Individual all-around	2nd place, silver medalist(s)	1st place, gold medalist(s)	1st place, gold medalist(s)	3rd place, bronze medalist(s)	1st place, gold medalist(s)	–	3rd place, bronze medalist(s)	1st place, gold medalist(s)	2nd place, silver medalist(s)	3rd place, bronze medalist(s)	2nd place, silver medalist(s)	2nd place, silver medalist(s)	1st place, gold medalist(s)	–	1st place, gold medalist(s)	1st place, gold medalist(s)	1st place, gold medalist(s)	2nd place, silver medalist(s)	1st place, gold medalist(s)	1st place, gold medalist(s)	1st place, gold medalist(s)
Floor exercise	–	1st place, gold medalist(s)	–	1st place, gold medalist(s)	1st place, gold medalist(s)	1st place, gold medalist(s)	3rd place, bronze medalist(s)	2nd place, silver medalist(s)	1st place, gold medalist(s)	1st place, gold medalist(s)	3rd place, bronze medalist(s)	1st place, gold medalist(s)	1st place, gold medalist(s)	1st place, gold medalist(s)	1st place, gold medalist(s)	1st place, gold medalist(s)	1st place, gold medalist(s)	1st place, gold medalist(s)	1st place, gold medalist(s)	1st place, gold medalist(s)	1st place, gold medalist(s)
Pommel horse	–	–	1st place, gold medalist(s)	3rd place, bronze medalist(s)	1st place, gold medalist(s)	1st place, gold medalist(s)	–	1st place, gold medalist(s)	1st place, gold medalist(s)	1st place, gold medalist(s)	1st place, gold medalist(s)	1st place, gold medalist(s)	1st place, gold medalist(s)	1st place, gold medalist(s)	1st place, gold medalist(s)	1st place, gold medalist(s)	1st place, gold medalist(s)	3rd place, bronze medalist(s)	1st place, gold medalist(s)	1st place, gold medalist(s)	1st place, gold medalist(s)
Still rings	2nd place, silver medalist(s)	3rd place, bronze medalist(s)	1st place, gold medalist(s)	1st place, gold medalist(s)	1st place, gold medalist(s)	1st place, gold medalist(s)	2nd place, silver medalist(s)	1st place, gold medalist(s)	3rd place, bronze medalist(s)	2nd place, silver medalist(s)	1st place, gold medalist(s)	1st place, gold medalist(s)	1st place, gold medalist(s)	1st place, gold medalist(s)	2nd place, silver medalist(s)	1st place, gold medalist(s)	1st place, gold medalist(s)	3rd place, bronze medalist(s)	1st place, gold medalist(s)	1st place, gold medalist(s)	1st place, gold medalist(s)
Vault	–	1st place, gold medalist(s)	–	3rd place, bronze medalist(s)	1st place, gold medalist(s)	2nd place, silver medalist(s)	2nd place, silver medalist(s)	1st place, gold medalist(s)	1st place, gold medalist(s)	3rd place, bronze medalist(s)	2nd place, silver medalist(s)	2nd place, silver medalist(s)	1st place, gold medalist(s)	1st place, gold medalist(s)	1st place, gold medalist(s)	1st place, gold medalist(s)	1st place, gold medalist(s)	1st place, gold medalist(s)	1st place, gold medalist(s)	2nd place, silver medalist(s)	–
Parallel bars	3rd place, bronze medalist(s)	1st place, gold medalist(s)	2nd place, silver medalist(s)	–	1st place, gold medalist(s)	1st place, gold medalist(s)	2nd place, silver medalist(s)	1st place, gold medalist(s)	1st place, gold medalist(s)	1st place, gold medalist(s)	1st place, gold medalist(s)	1st place, gold medalist(s)	1st place, gold medalist(s)	–	2nd place, silver medalist(s)	1st place, gold medalist(s)	1st place, gold medalist(s)	1st place, gold medalist(s)	1st place, gold medalist(s)	1st place, gold medalist(s)	1st place, gold medalist(s)
Horizontal bar	2nd place, silver medalist(s)	1st place, gold medalist(s)	1st place, gold medalist(s)	2nd place, silver medalist(s)	1st place, gold medalist(s)	1st place, gold medalist(s)	1st place, gold medalist(s)	1st place, gold medalist(s)	3rd place, bronze medalist(s)	2nd place, silver medalist(s)	1st place, gold medalist(s)	2nd place, silver medalist(s)	1st place, gold medalist(s)	2nd place, silver medalist(s)	1st place, gold medalist(s)	1st place, gold medalist(s)	1st place, gold medalist(s)	2nd place, silver medalist(s)	1st place, gold medalist(s)	1st place, gold medalist(s)	1st place, gold medalist(s)

=== Women's results ===
Only nations with medals in three or more events are listed. Results for Germany and West Germany have been combined.

Event	(Australia) AUS	(Austria) AUT	(Brazil) BRA	(Canada) CAN	(China) CHN	(France) FRA	(United Kingdom) GBR	(East Germany) GDR	(Germany) GER	(Hungary) HUN	(Italy) ITA	(Japan) JPN	(Netherlands) NED	(Poland) POL	(Romania) ROU	(Russia) RUS	(Sweden) SWE	(Czechoslovakia) TCH	(Ukraine) UKR	(Soviet Union) URS	(United States) USA
Team	3rd place, bronze medalist(s)	6	2nd place, silver medalist(s)	3rd place, bronze medalist(s)	1st place, gold medalist(s)	2nd place, silver medalist(s)	2nd place, silver medalist(s)	2nd place, silver medalist(s)	6	2nd place, silver medalist(s)	3rd place, bronze medalist(s)	3rd place, bronze medalist(s)	5	3rd place, bronze medalist(s)	1st place, gold medalist(s)	1st place, gold medalist(s)	1st place, gold medalist(s)	1st place, gold medalist(s)	3rd place, bronze medalist(s)	1st place, gold medalist(s)	1st place, gold medalist(s)
Individual all-around	3rd place, bronze medalist(s)	3rd place, bronze medalist(s)	1st place, gold medalist(s)	2nd place, silver medalist(s)	2nd place, silver medalist(s)	5	3rd place, bronze medalist(s)	2nd place, silver medalist(s)	6	2nd place, silver medalist(s)	1st place, gold medalist(s)	2nd place, silver medalist(s)	5	1st place, gold medalist(s)	1st place, gold medalist(s)	1st place, gold medalist(s)	2nd place, silver medalist(s)	1st place, gold medalist(s)	1st place, gold medalist(s)	1st place, gold medalist(s)	1st place, gold medalist(s)
Vault	5	2nd place, silver medalist(s)	1st place, gold medalist(s)	2nd place, silver medalist(s)	1st place, gold medalist(s)	3rd place, bronze medalist(s)	3rd place, bronze medalist(s)	1st place, gold medalist(s)	2nd place, silver medalist(s)	1st place, gold medalist(s)	2nd place, silver medalist(s)	5	6	1st place, gold medalist(s)	1st place, gold medalist(s)	1st place, gold medalist(s)	1st place, gold medalist(s)	1st place, gold medalist(s)	1st place, gold medalist(s)	1st place, gold medalist(s)	1st place, gold medalist(s)
Uneven bars	5	1st place, gold medalist(s)	2nd place, silver medalist(s)	8	1st place, gold medalist(s)	3rd place, bronze medalist(s)	1st place, gold medalist(s)	1st place, gold medalist(s)	2nd place, silver medalist(s)	1st place, gold medalist(s)	3rd place, bronze medalist(s)	2nd place, silver medalist(s)	2nd place, silver medalist(s)	3rd place, bronze medalist(s)	1st place, gold medalist(s)	1st place, gold medalist(s)	1st place, gold medalist(s)	2nd place, silver medalist(s)	2nd place, silver medalist(s)	1st place, gold medalist(s)	1st place, gold medalist(s)
Balance beam	2nd place, silver medalist(s)	–	3rd place, bronze medalist(s)	2nd place, silver medalist(s)	1st place, gold medalist(s)	4	–	1st place, gold medalist(s)	1st place, gold medalist(s)	3rd place, bronze medalist(s)	2nd place, silver medalist(s)	1st place, gold medalist(s)	2nd place, silver medalist(s)	1st place, gold medalist(s)	1st place, gold medalist(s)	1st place, gold medalist(s)	–	1st place, gold medalist(s)	1st place, gold medalist(s)	1st place, gold medalist(s)	1st place, gold medalist(s)
Floor exercise	1st place, gold medalist(s)	–	1st place, gold medalist(s)	5	1st place, gold medalist(s)	3rd place, bronze medalist(s)	1st place, gold medalist(s)	3rd place, bronze medalist(s)	–	2nd place, silver medalist(s)	2nd place, silver medalist(s)	1st place, gold medalist(s)	2nd place, silver medalist(s)	1st place, gold medalist(s)	1st place, gold medalist(s)	1st place, gold medalist(s)	–	1st place, gold medalist(s)	3rd place, bronze medalist(s)	1st place, gold medalist(s)	1st place, gold medalist(s)

== See also ==
- Artistic Gymnastics Junior World Championships
- Gymnastics at the Summer Olympics
- Gymnastics at the Summer Youth Olympics
- Gymnastics World Championships
- List of gymnastics competitions
- Major achievements in gymnastics by nation
