= Artistic Gymnastics Junior World Championships =

International artistic gymnastics competition for juniors

The FIG Artistic Gymnastics Junior World Championships, or FIG World Junior Artistic Gymnastics Championships, is an artistic gymnastics competition organized by the International Gymnastics Federation (FIG).

== History ==
The inaugural edition was held in Győr, Hungary in June 2019. Subsequent championships are then to be held biannually in odd numbered years from 2021 onward. However, the edition that was to be held in 2021 was never scheduled due to the COVID-19 pandemic. The second iteration of the championships took place in 2023.

Those eligible are girls aged 14–15 and boys aged 16–17. (There's also a proposal to let 18-year-old boys stay on junior level for that year's world championships. If they choose to compete at the junior worlds, they won't be able to compete at the senior ones, and vice versa. The proposal will be discussed at the FIG Council meeting in Namibia in May 2020.)

The programme of the junior worlds comprises eight boys' (team, all-around, floor exercise, pommel horse, rings, vault, parallel bars, horizontal bar) and six girls' disciplines (team, all-around, floor exercise, vault, uneven bars, balance beam), with a total of 14 sets of medals at stake.

== Editions ==
Year	Edition	Host city	Country	Events (boys/girls)	First in the Medal Table	Second in the Medal Table	Third in the Medal Table
2019	1st	Győr	Hungary	8 / 6	Russia	Japan	Ukraine
2023	2nd	Antalya	Turkey	8 / 6	Japan	Italy	China
2025	3rd	Pasay (Note: Promoted as Manila in all marketing materials)	Philippines	8 / 6	China	Japan	United States
2027	4th	Cairo	Egypt				

== Best results of top nations by event ==
=== Men's results ===
Only nations who have won a medal and have top 8 finishes on at least three events are listed. Positions below 8 are not taken into account.

Event	(Armenia) ARM	(Brazil) BRA	(Canada) CAN	(China) CHN	(Colombia) COL	(France) FRA	(United Kingdom) GBR	(Hungary) HUN	(Italy) ITA	(Japan) JPN	(Philippines) PHI	(Ukraine) UKR	(United States) USA
Team	4	–	5	1st place, gold medalist(s)	–	4	5	–	3rd place, bronze medalist(s)	1st place, gold medalist(s)	–	2nd place, silver medalist(s)	3rd place, bronze medalist(s)
Individual all-around	6	–	4	1st place, gold medalist(s)	2nd place, silver medalist(s)	7	6	–	3rd place, bronze medalist(s)	1st place, gold medalist(s)	8	3rd place, bronze medalist(s)	4
Floor exercise	–	–	2nd place, silver medalist(s)	1st place, gold medalist(s)	1st place, gold medalist(s)	4	8	–	2nd place, silver medalist(s)	3rd place, bronze medalist(s)	3rd place, bronze medalist(s)	3rd place, bronze medalist(s)	6
Pommel horse	1st place, gold medalist(s)	–	–	1st place, gold medalist(s)	–	2nd place, silver medalist(s)	4	–	–	1st place, gold medalist(s)	–	6	–
Still rings	1st place, gold medalist(s)	2nd place, silver medalist(s)	1st place, gold medalist(s)	3rd place, bronze medalist(s)	–	4	–	–	2nd place, silver medalist(s)	2nd place, silver medalist(s)	–	–	1st place, gold medalist(s)
Vault	–	5	2nd place, silver medalist(s)	2nd place, silver medalist(s)	–	7	2nd place, silver medalist(s)	3rd place, bronze medalist(s)	1st place, gold medalist(s)	8	4	7	–
Parallel bars	4	–	–	2nd place, silver medalist(s)	1st place, gold medalist(s)	–	6	5	–	1st place, gold medalist(s)	–	4	3rd place, bronze medalist(s)
Horizontal bar	–	6	–	2nd place, silver medalist(s)	1st place, gold medalist(s)	6	6	3rd place, bronze medalist(s)	4	1st place, gold medalist(s)	3rd place, bronze medalist(s)	1st place, gold medalist(s)	2nd place, silver medalist(s)

=== Women's results ===
Only nations who have won a medal and have top 8 finishes on at least two events are listed are listed. Positions below 8 are not taken into account.

Event	(Argentina) ARG	(Canada) CAN	(China) CHN	(France) FRA	(Germany) GER	(United Kingdom) GBR	(Italy) ITA	(Japan) JPN	(Romania) ROU	(Russia) RUS	(United States) USA
Team	5	4	2nd place, silver medalist(s)	1st place, gold medalist(s)	7	6	3rd place, bronze medalist(s)	1st place, gold medalist(s)	4	1st place, gold medalist(s)	2nd place, silver medalist(s)
Individual all-around	–	–	3rd place, bronze medalist(s)	2nd place, silver medalist(s)	6	5	3rd place, bronze medalist(s)	1st place, gold medalist(s)	8	1st place, gold medalist(s)	4
Vault	1st place, gold medalist(s)	7	6	3rd place, bronze medalist(s)	–	2nd place, silver medalist(s)	2nd place, silver medalist(s)	2nd place, silver medalist(s)	3rd place, bronze medalist(s)	3rd place, bronze medalist(s)	1st place, gold medalist(s)
Uneven bars	6	–	3rd place, bronze medalist(s)	4	2nd place, silver medalist(s)	6	1st place, gold medalist(s)	4	–	1st place, gold medalist(s)	3rd place, bronze medalist(s)
Balance beam	–	3rd place, bronze medalist(s)	1st place, gold medalist(s)	8	7	6	8	2nd place, silver medalist(s)	2nd place, silver medalist(s)	1st place, gold medalist(s)	3rd place, bronze medalist(s)
Floor exercise	–	6	2nd place, silver medalist(s)	2nd place, silver medalist(s)	–	4	1st place, gold medalist(s)	1st place, gold medalist(s)	6	1st place, gold medalist(s)	2nd place, silver medalist(s)

== All time medal table ==
Rank	Nation	Gold	Silver	Bronze	Total
1	Japan	12	8	4	24
2	China	6	7	6	19
3	Russia	5	3	2	10
4	Colombia	4	1	1	6
5	Italy	3	3	8	14
6	United States	3	3	7	13
–	Individual Neutral Athletes	3	0	0	3
7	Armenia	2	1	0	3
8	France	1	3	2	6
9	Canada	1	2	1	4
10	Ukraine	1	1	2	4
11	Romania	1	1	1	3
12	Argentina	1	0	0	1
12	South Korea	1	0	0	1
14	(United Kingdom) Great Britain	0	2	2	4
15	Germany	0	2	0	2
16	Brazil	0	1	0	1
16	Slovakia	0	1	0	1
18	Hungary	0	0	2	2
18	Philippines	0	0	2	2
20	Egypt	0	0	1	1
20	Kazakhstan	0	0	1	1
20	Latvia	0	0	1	1
Totals (22 entries)		44	39	43	126

== See also ==
- World Artistic Gymnastics Championships
