= List of gymnastics competitions =

This is a list of some of the notable international and national gymnastics competitions.

== Acrobatic gymnastics (FIG) ==
=== Official competitions ===
- Acrobatic Gymnastics World Championships (1974–)
- FIG World Age Group Competitions (2001–)
- FIG World Cup series (2001–)
- World Games (1993–)
- Youth Olympic Games (2018–)

=== Multi-sport events ===
==== Senior ====
- European Games (2015–)

=== Championships ===
==== Junior ====
- Acrobatic Gymnastics European Age Group Competition (2005–)
- Acrobatic Gymnastics Pan American Age Group Competition (2015–)
- Junior European Acrobatic Gymnastics Championships (1996–)

==== International ====
- Asian Gymnastics Championships (1992–)
- European Acrobatics Championships (1978–)
- Pan American Gymnastics Championships (2015–)
- WOGA Classic (1994–)

==== Defunct championships ====
- FIG World Cup Final (2003–2007)
- IFSA Acrobatic Gymnastics Junior World Championships (1989–1999)
- IFSA World Cup (1975–1993)

== Aerobic gymnastics (FIG) ==
=== Official competitions ===
- Aerobic Gymnastics World Age Group Competitions (2004–)
- Aerobic Gymnastics World Championships (1995–)
- FIG Aerobic Gymnastics World Cup series (1999–)
- World Games (1997–)

=== Multi-sport events ===
==== Youth ====
- Gymnasiade (2013)

==== Senior ====
- African Games (2015–)
- European Games (2015–)
- Southeast Asian Games (2003–2007, 2011)
- Summer Universiade (2011)

==== Defunct events ====
- Asian Indoor Games (2005–2009)

=== Championships ===
==== International ====
- Aerobic Gymnastics European Championships (1999–)
- Asian Gymnastics Championships (2009–)
- Pan American Gymnastics Championships (1999–)
- South American Gymnastics Championships

==== National ====
- US National Aerobic Championships (United States)

==== Defunct championships ====
- FIG Aerobic Gymnastics World Cup Final (2001–2007)

== Aesthetic group gymnastics (IFAAG) ==
=== Official competitions ===
- IFAAG Aesthetic Group Gymnastics World Championships (2000–)
- IFAAG Aesthetic Group Gymnastics Junior World Championships (2009–)
- IFAAG Aesthetic Group Gymnastics World Cup and Challenge Cup (2009–)

=== Multi-sport events ===
==== Youth ====
- SELL Student Games

=== Championships ===
==== International ====
- Aesthetic Group Gymnastics European Championships (2016–)
- Four Continents Aesthetic Group Gymnastics Championships (2014–)
- Miss Valentine
- Pan American Aesthetic Group Gymnastics Championships (2017–)

== Artistic gymnastics (FIG) ==
=== Official competitions ===
Event	Type	Participation	First held	Current Frequency
Summer Olympic Games	Multi-sport event	Global	1896	Every four years
World Artistic Gymnastics Championships	World Championships	Global	1903	Annually; Except when the Summer Olympics are held
Artistic Gymnastics World Cup and Challenge Cup series	World Cup	Global	1975	Annually; Divided in stages throughout the year
Summer Youth Olympic Games	Multi-sport event for gymnasts aged 14 to 18 years old	Global	2010	Every four years
Artistic Gymnastics Junior World Championships	World Championships for junior gymnasts	Global	2019	Every two years

=== Multi-sport events ===
==== Youth ====
- Asian Youth Games (2021)
- Australian Youth Olympic Festival (2001–2013)
- Commonwealth Youth Games (2004, 2011)
- European Youth Summer Olympic Festival (1993–)
- Gymnasiade
- Junior Pan American Games (2021)
- South American Youth Games (2013–)
- Youth Commonwealth Games (2004–2011)

==== Senior ====
- African Games (1991–2007, 2015–)
- Bolivarian Games (1965–)
- BRICS Games (2024)
- Asian Games (1974–)
- Central American and Caribbean Games (1946–1959, 1970–)
- Central American Games
- Commonwealth Games (1978–)
- European Games (2015–)
- Games of the Small States of Europe (1997, 2007–2009, 2013–2015)
- Islamic Solidarity Games (2017)
- Island Games (1989–2013, 2017–)
- Maccabiah Games
- Mediterranean Games (1951–)
- Military World Games (2019)
- Pan American Games (1951–)
- South American Games (1978–)
- Southeast Asian Games (1979–1981, 1985–1997, 2001–2007, 2011, 2015–)
- Summer Universiade (1961–)

==== Disability ====
- Special Olympics World Games
- Summer Deaflympics (1928, 1957–1969)

==== Defunct events ====
- ALBA Games (2005-2011)
- East Asian Games (1993–2013)
- Goodwill Games (1986–2001)
- Pan American Sports Festival (2014)
- Pan Arab Games (1953–2011)
- West Asian Games (2002–2005)

=== Championships ===
==== International ====
- American Cup (1976–)
- Asian Gymnastics Championships (1996–)
- City of Jesolo Trophy (2008–)
- European Artistic Gymnastics Championships (1955–)
- Northern European Gymnastics Championships (2005–)
- Pacific Rim Championships (1988–)
- Pan American Gymnastics Championships (1997–)
- South American Gymnastics Championships (1957–)
- WOGA Classic

==== National ====
- All-Japan Artistic Gymnastics Championships (Japan)
- Brazilian Artistic Gymnastics Championships (Brazil)
- Canadian Gymnastics Championships (Canada)
- Chinese Artistic Gymnastics Championships (China)
- Dutch Artistic Gymnastics Championships (Netherlands)
- French Gymnastics Championships (France)
- German Artistic Gymnastics Championships (Germany)
- Italian Artistic Gymnastics Championships (Italy)
- Nastia Liukin Cup (United States)
- NCAA Men's Gymnastics Championships (United States, college gymnastics)
- NCAA Women's Gymnastics Championships (United States, college gymnastics)
- Romanian Gymnastics National Championships (Romania)
- Russian Artistic Gymnastics Championships (Russia)
- U.S. Classic (United States)
- USA Gymnastics National Championships (United States)

==== Defunct championships ====
- Artistic Gymnastics World Cup Final (1975–2008)

== Gymnastics for all (FIG) ==
=== Official events ===
- World Gym For Life Challenge
- World Gymnaestrada

== Parkour (FIG) ==
=== Official competitions ===
- Parkour World Cup series (2018–)
- Parkour World Championships (2022–)

=== Multi-sport events ===
==== Senior ====
- World Games (2021–)
- World Urban Games (2019–)

== Rhythmic gymnastics (FIG) ==
=== Official competitions ===
Event	Type	Participation	First held	Current Frequency
World Rhythmic Gymnastics Championships	World Championships	Global	1963	Annually; Except when the Summer Olympics are held
Rhythmic Gymnastics World Cup and Challenge Cup series	World Cup	Global	1983	Annually
Summer Olympic Games	Multi-sport event	Global	1984	Every four years
World Games	Multi-sport event for non Olympic category	Global	2001	Every four years
Summer Youth Olympic Games	Multi-sport event for gymnasts aged 14 to 18 years old	Global	2010	Every four years
Rhythmic Gymnastics Junior World Championships	World Championships for junior gymnasts	Global	2019	Every two years

=== Multi-sport events ===
==== Youth ====
- Australian Youth Olympic Festival (2001–2013)
- Gymnasiade

==== Senior ====
- Asian Games (1994–)
- Black Sea Games (2007–)
- Bolivarian Games (2001–)
- BRICS Games (2024)
- Central American and Caribbean Games (1998–)
- Commonwealth Games (1998, 2006–)
- European Games (2015–)
- Games of the Small States of Europe (2009)
- Islamic Solidarity Games (2017)
- Maccabiah Games
- Mediterranean Games (2005–)
- Pan American Games (1987–)
- South American Games (1990–)
- Southeast Asian Games
- Summer Universiade (1991–)

==== Disability ====
- Special Olympics World Games

==== Defunct events ====
- ALBA Games (2005–2011)
- Friendship Games (1984)
- Goodwill Games (1986–2001)
- Pan American Sports Festival (2014)

=== Championships ===
==== International ====
- Asian Gymnastics Championships (1996–)
- Commonwealth Rhythmic Gymnastics Championship
- Miss Valentine (2013–)
- Pacific Rim Championships (1996–)
- Pan American Gymnastics Championships (1997–)
- Rhythmic Gymnastics Grand Prix (1994–)
- South American Gymnastics Championships

==== National ====
- French Rhythmic Gymnastics Championships
- Italian Rhythmic Gymnastics Championships
- Polish Rhythmic Gymnastics Championships
- Russian Rhythmic Gymnastics Championships
- Slovenian Rhythmic Gymnastics Championships
- Spanish Rhythmic Gymnastics Championships

==== Defunct championships ====
- Baltic Sea Games (1993–1997)
- Rhythmic Gymnastics World Cup Final (1983–2008)
- Four Continents Rhythmic Gymnastics Championships (1978–2001)

== TeamGym (UEG) ==
=== Official competitions ===
- UEG European TeamGym Championships (1996–)

== Trampoline and tumbling (FIG) ==
=== Official competitions ===
- Trampoline World Championships (1964–)
- Trampoline Gymnastics World Age Group Competitions (FIT and FIG) (1973–)
- World Games (1981–)
- Trampoline World Cup (FIT) and Trampoline World Cup series (FIG) (1984–)
- Summer Olympic Games (2000–)
- Youth Olympic Games (2010–)

=== Multi-sport events ===
==== Youth ====
- Australian Youth Olympic Festival (2001–2013)

==== Senior ====
- Asian Games (2006–)
- Central American and Caribbean Games (2014–)
- European Games (2015–)
- Island Games (1993)
- Pan American Games (1955–1959, 2011–)
- South American Games (1978–1982, 2018–)

==== Defunct events ====
- Pan American Sports Festival (2014)
- Pan Arab Games (2011)

=== Championships ===
==== International ====
- African Trampoline Championships (2002–)
- Asian Gymnastics Championships (2014–)
- European Trampoline Championships (1969–)
- Pacific Rim Championships (1988–)
- Pan American Gymnastics Championships (2004–)
- South American Gymnastics Championships (2013–)

==== Defunct championships ====
- Trampoline World Cup Final (1993–2008)

== Wheel gymnastics (IRV) ==
=== Official competitions ===
- IRV Wheel Gymnastics World Championships (1995–)
- IRV Wheel Gymnastics Team World Cup (2002–)

== Men's Ryhthmic Gymnastics ==
- Men's Rhythmic Gymnastics World Championships (2003-)

== Mallakhamba ==
- Mallakhamba World Championships (2018-)
