= World Artistic Gymnastics Championships – Women's balance beam =

Women's events at the Artistic Gymnastics World Championships were first held in 1934, at the 10th World Championships. Only the All-Around and Team events were held. In 1938, at the 11th World Championships, the other apparatus events were added.

The women's balance beam competition has been held in every year since its inception.

Three medals are awarded: gold for first place, silver for second place, and bronze for third place. Tie breakers have not been used in every year. In the event of a tie between two gymnasts, both names are listed, and the following position (second for a tie for first, third for a tie for second) is left empty because a medal was not awarded for that position. If three gymnastics tied for a position, the following two positions are left empty.

== Medalists ==
Bold numbers in brackets denotes record number of victories.

Year	Location	Gold	Silver	Bronze
1938	(Czechoslovakia) Prague *	(Czechoslovakia) Vlasta Děkanová *	unknown	unknown
1950	(Switzerland) Basel	(Poland) Helena Rakoczy	(Italy) Marja Nutti	(Italy) Licia Macchini
1954	(Italy) Rome	(Japan) Keiko Tanaka	(Czechoslovakia) Eva Bosáková	(Hungary) Ágnes Keleti
1958	(Soviet Union) Moscow	(Soviet Union) Larisa Latynina	(Soviet Union) Sofia Muratova	(Japan) Keiko Tanaka
1962	(Czechoslovakia) Prague	(Czechoslovakia) Eva Bosáková	(Soviet Union) Larisa Latynina	(Hungary) Anikó Ducza (Japan) Keiko Ikeda
1966	(West Germany) Dortmund	(Soviet Union) Natalia Kuchinskaya	(Czechoslovakia) Věra Čáslavská	(Soviet Union) Larisa Petrik
1970	(Socialist Federal Republic of Yugoslavia) Ljubljana	(East Germany) Erika Zuchold	(United States) Cathy Rigby	(Soviet Union) Larisa Petrik (East Germany) Christine Schmitt
1974	(Bulgaria) Varna	(Soviet Union) Ludmilla Tourischeva	(Soviet Union) Olga Korbut	(Soviet Union) Nellie Kim
1978	(France) Strasbourg	(Romania) Nadia Comăneci	(Soviet Union) Elena Mukhina	(Romania) Emilia Eberle
1979	(United States) Fort Worth	(Czechoslovakia) Věra Černá	(Soviet Union) Nellie Kim	(East Germany) Regina Grabolle
1981	(Soviet Union) Moscow	(East Germany) Maxi Gnauck	(China) Chen Yongyan	(United States) Tracee Talavera (China) Wu Jiani
1983	(Hungary) Budapest	(Soviet Union) Olga Mostepanova	(Czechoslovakia) Hana Říčná	(Romania) Lavinia Agache
1985	(Canada) Montreal	(Romania) Daniela Silivaș	(Romania) Ecaterina Szabó	(Soviet Union) Yelena Shushunova
1987	(Netherlands) Rotterdam	(Romania) Aurelia Dobre	(Soviet Union) Yelena Shushunova	(Soviet Union) Svetlana Boginskaya (Romania) Ecaterina Szabó
1989	(West Germany) Stuttgart	(Romania) Daniela Silivaș	(Soviet Union) Olesya Dudnik	(Romania) Gabriela Potorac
1991	(United States) Indianapolis	(Soviet Union) Svetlana Boginskaya	(Soviet Union) Tatiana Gutsu	(Romania) Lavinia Miloșovici (United States) Betty Okino
1992	(France) Paris	(United States) Kim Zmeskal	(China) Li Yifang (Romania) Maria Neculiță	—N/a
1993	(United Kingdom) Birmingham	(Romania) Lavinia Miloșovici	(United States) Dominique Dawes	(Romania) Gina Gogean
1994	(Australia) Brisbane	(United States) Shannon Miller	(Ukraine) Lilia Podkopayeva	(Russia) Oksana Fabrichnova
1995	(Japan) Sabae	(China) Mo Huilan	(United States) Dominique Moceanu (Ukraine) Lilia Podkopayeva	—N/a
1996	(Puerto Rico) San Juan	(Russia) Dina Kochetkova	(Romania) Alexandra Marinescu	(United States) Dominique Dawes (China) Liu Xuan
1997	(Switzerland) Lausanne	(Romania) Gina Gogean	(Russia) Svetlana Khorkina	(China) Kui Yuanyuan
1999	(China) Tianjin	(China) Ling Jie	(Romania) Andreea Răducan	(Ukraine) Olha Rozshchupkina
2001	(Belgium) Ghent	(Romania) Andreea Răducan	(Russia) Ludmila Ezhova	(China) Sun Xiaojiao
2002	(Hungary) Debrecen	(United States) Ashley Postell	(Romania) Oana Ban	(Ukraine) Irina Yarotska
2003	(United States) Anaheim	(China) Fan Ye	(Romania) Cătălina Ponor	(Russia) Ludmila Ezhova
2005	(Australia) Melbourne	(United States) Nastia Liukin	(United States) Chellsie Memmel	(Romania) Cătălina Ponor
2006	(Denmark) Aarhus	(Ukraine) Iryna Krasnianska	(Romania) Sandra Izbașa	(Canada) Elyse Hopfner-Hibbs
2007	(Germany) Stuttgart	(United States) Nastia Liukin	(China) Li Shanshan (Romania) Steliana Nistor	—N/a
2009	(United Kingdom) London	(China) Deng Linlin	(Australia) Lauren Mitchell	(United States) Ivana Hong
2010	(Netherlands) Rotterdam	(Romania) Ana Porgras	(United States) Rebecca Bross (China) Deng Linlin	—N/a
2011	(Japan) Tokyo	(China) Sui Lu	(China) Yao Jinnan	(United States) Jordyn Wieber
2013	(Belgium) Antwerp	(Russia) Aliya Mustafina	(United States) Kyla Ross	(United States) Simone Biles
2014	(China) Nanning	(United States) Simone Biles	(China) Bai Yawen	(Russia) Aliya Mustafina
2015	(United Kingdom) Glasgow	(United States) Simone Biles	(Netherlands) Sanne Wevers	(Germany) Pauline Schäfer
2017	(Canada) Montreal	(Germany) Pauline Schäfer	(United States) Morgan Hurd	(Germany) Tabea Alt
2018	(Qatar) Doha	(China) Liu Tingting	(Canada) Ana Padurariu	(United States) Simone Biles
2019	(Germany) Stuttgart	(United States) Simone Biles	(China) Liu Tingting	(China) Li Shijia
2021	(Japan) Kitakyushu	(Japan) Urara Ashikawa	(Germany) Pauline Schäfer-Betz	(Japan) Mai Murakami
2022	(United Kingdom) Liverpool	(Japan) Hazuki Watanabe	(Canada) Ellie Black	(Japan) Miyata Shoko
2023	(Belgium) Antwerp	(United States) Simone Biles (4)	(China) Zhou Yaqin	(Brazil) Rebeca Andrade
2025	(Indonesia) Jakarta	(China) Zhang Qingying	(Algeria) Kaylia Nemour	(Japan) Aiko Sugihara
2026	(Netherlands) Rotterdam	(Algeria) Kaylia Nemour	(China) Zhang Qingying	(Brazil) Flávia Saraiva

* There is conflicting and incomplete information about medal winners in the individual apparatus events at the 1938 World Artistic Gymnastics Championships as non-primary sources gives different information about it.

== All-time medal count ==
Last updated after the 2026 World Championships.

Rank	Nation	Gold	Silver	Bronze	Total
1	United States	9	7	7	23
2	Romania	8	8	7	23
3	China	7	9	5	21
4	Soviet Union	5	8	5	18
5	Czechoslovakia	3	3	0	6
6	Japan	3	0	5	8
7	Russia	2	2	3	7
8	East Germany	2	0	2	4
9	Ukraine	1	2	2	5
10	Germany	1	1	2	4
11	Algeria	1	1	0	2
12	Poland	1	0	0	1
13	Canada	0	2	1	3
14	Italy	0	1	1	2
15	Australia	0	1	0	1
15	Netherlands	0	1	0	1
17	Brazil	0	0	2	2
17	Hungary	0	0	2	2
Totals (18 entries)		43	46	44	133

== Multiple medalists ==
Rank	Gymnast	Nation	Years	Gold	Silver	Bronze	Total
1	Simone Biles	United States	2013–2023	4	0	2	6
2	Nastia Liukin	United States	2005–2007	2	0	0	2
2	Daniela Silivaș	Romania	1985–1989	2	0	0	2
4	Pauline Schäfer	Germany	2015–2021	1	1	1	3
5	Eva Bosáková	Czechoslovakia	1954–1962	1	1	0	2
5	Deng Linlin	China	2009–2010	1	1	0	2
5	Larisa Latynina	Soviet Union	1958–1962	1	1	0	2
5	Kaylia Nemour	Algeria	2025–2026	1	1	0	2
5	Liu Tingting	China	2018–2019	1	1	0	2
5	Andreea Răducan	Romania	1999–2001	1	1	0	2
5	Zhang Qingying	China	2025–2026	1	1	0	2
12	Keiko Tanaka-Ikeda	Japan	1954–1958	1	0	2	3
13	Svetlana Boginskaya	Soviet Union	1987–1991	1	0	1	2
13	Gina Gogean	Romania	1993–1997	1	0	1	2
13	Lavinia Miloșovici	Romania	1991–1993	1	0	1	2
13	Aliya Mustafina	Russia	2013–2014	1	0	1	2
17	Lilia Podkopayeva	Ukraine	1994–1995	0	2	0	2
18	Dominique Dawes	United States	1993–1996	0	1	1	2
18	Ludmila Ezhova	Russia	2001–2003	0	1	1	2
18	Nellie Kim	Soviet Union	1974–1979	0	1	1	2
18	Cătălina Ponor	Romania	2003–2005	0	1	1	2
18	Yelena Shushunova	Soviet Union	1985–1987	0	1	1	2
18	Ecaterina Szabo	Romania	1985–1987	0	1	1	2
24	Larisa Petrik	Soviet Union	1966–1970	0	0	2	2
