= Poland at the World Artistic Gymnastics Championships =

- Flag of Poland
- IOC code: POL
- Medals: Gold 5 Silver 2 Bronze 9 Total 16

Poland made their World Championships debut in 1934 where the women's team won the bronze medal. At the 1950 World Championships Helena Rakoczy became the first Polish world champion, winning gold in the all-around and on vault, balance beam, and floor exercise. At the 1974 World Championships Andrzej Szajna won two bronze medals and became the first Polish male artistic gymnast to win a World Championships medal.

== Medalists ==
Medal	Name	Year	Event
Bronze	Dylewska, Lubańska, Mikulska, Pawłowska, Sierońska, Skirlińska, Szymowa, Wisłocka,	(Hungary) 1934 Budapest	Women's team
Bronze	Janina Skirlińska	(Hungary) 1934 Budapest	Women's all-around
Bronze	Skirlińska, Stępińska, Wajsna, Łuczyńska, Osadnikówna, Wojciechowska, Majowska, Noskiewiczówna	(Czechoslovakia) 1938 Prague	Women's team
Gold	Helena Rakoczy	(Switzerland) 1950 Basel	Women's all-around
Gold	Helena Rakoczy	(Switzerland) 1950 Basel	Women's vault
Bronze	Helena Rakoczy	(Switzerland) 1950 Basel	Women's uneven bars
Gold	Helena Rakoczy	(Switzerland) 1950 Basel	Women's balance beam
Gold	Helena Rakoczy	(Switzerland) 1950 Basel	Women's floor exercise
Bronze	Stefania Reindl	(Switzerland) 1950 Basel	Women's floor exercise
Bronze	Helena Rakoczy	(Italy) 1954 Rome	Women's all-around
Bronze	Helena Rakoczy	(Italy) 1954 Rome	Women's uneven bars
Bronze	Andrzej Szajna	(Bulgaria) 1974 Varna	Men's rings
Bronze	Andrzej Szajna	(Bulgaria) 1974 Varna	Men's horizontal bar
Silver	Leszek Blanik	(Hungary) 2002 Debrecen	Men's vault
Silver	Leszek Blanik	(Australia) 2005 Melbourne	Men's vault
Gold	Leszek Blanik	(Germany) 2007 Stuttgart	Men's vault

== Medal tables ==
=== By gender ===
Gender	Gold	Silver	Bronze	Total
Women	4	0	7	11
Men	1	2	2	5
