= Gymnastics at the 2022 Commonwealth Games – Men's pommel horse =

Men's pommel horse at the 2022 Commonwealth Games
- Venue: Arena Birmingham
- Dates: 29 July 2022 (qualification); 1 August 2022 (final)
- Competitors: 8 from 6 nations
- Winning score: 14.833

Medalists
gold medal	Joe Fraser	England
silver medal	Rhys McClenaghan	Northern Ireland
bronze medal	Jayson Rampersad	Canada

The Men's pommel horse gymnastics competition at the 2022 Commonwealth Games in Birmingham, England was held on 1 August 2022 at Arena Birmingham.

== Schedule ==
The schedule was as follows:

All times are British Summer Time (UTC+1)

Date	Time	Round
Friday 29 July 2022	09:08	Qualification
Monday 1 August 2022	14:10	Final

== Results ==
=== Qualification ===
Qualification for this apparatus final was determined within the team final. The results are as follows:

Rank	Gymnast	Difficulty	Execution	Penalty	Total	Notes
1	Joe Fraser (ENG)	6.100	8.550		14.650	Q
2	Rhys McClenaghan (NIR)	5.700	8.650		14.350	Q
3	Marios Georgiou (CYP)	5.400	8.450		13.850	Q
4	James Hall (ENG)	6.200	7.600		13.800	Q
5	Jesse Moore (AUS)	6.100	7.400		13.500	Q
6	Ethan Dick (NZL)	5.200	8.200		13.400	Q
7	Kenji Tamane (CAN)	5.600	7.700		13.300	Q
8	Jayson Rampersad (CAN)	5.900	7.350		13.250	Q
9	Jorden O'Connell-Inns (NZL)	5.600	7.600		13.200	R1
10	Giarnni Regini-Moran (ENG)	5.400	7.750		13.150	–
11	Jake Jarman (ENG)	5.900	7.200		13.100	–
12	Cameron Lynn (SCO)	4.900	8.100		13.000	R2
13	Ilias Georgiou (CYP)	4.900	7.950		12.850	R3
14	Hamish Carter (SCO)	5.300	7.550		12.850	
15	Tyson Bull (AUS)	4.300	8.500		12.800	
16	Joe Cemlyn-Jones (WAL)	4.500	8.250		12.750	
17	Frank Baines (SCO)	4.700	7.950		12.650	
18	Brinn Bevan (WAL)	4.800	7.700		12.500	
19	Joshua Cook (WAL)	5.000	7.300		12.300	
20	Pavel Karnejenko (SCO)	5.000	7.300		12.300	
21	Mathys Jalbert (CAN)	3.800	8.250		12.050	
22	Ruchira Fernando (SRI)	4.000	8.000		12.000	
23	Muhammad Sharul Aimy (MAS)	4.200	7.800		12.000	
24	Daniel Lee (JEY)	3.900	8.000		11.900	
25	Jacob Edwards (WAL)	4.900	6.950		11.850	
26	Mikhail Haziq (SGP)	3.800	7.950		11.750	
27	Mikhail Koudinov (NZL)	4.300	7.250		11.550	
28	Michalis Chari (CYP)	3.900	7.300		11.200	
29	Yogeshwar Singh (IND)	4.100	7.100		11.200	
30	James Bacueti (AUS)	5.200	5.950		11.150	
31	Clay Mason Stephens (AUS)	3.500	7.550		11.050	
32	Michael Reid (JAM)	5.400	5.650		11.050	
33	Georgios Angonas (CYP)	4.100	6.600		10.700	
34	Félix Dolci (CAN)	4.100	6.500		10.600	
35	Igor Magalhães (CAY)	3.000	6.250		9.250	
36	Karthik Adapa (CAY)	3.000	6.100		9.100	
37	Hansa Kumarasinghege (SRI)	2.900	6.150		9.050	
38	Muhammad Khaalid Mia (RSA)	5.000	3.850		8.850	
39	William Fu-Allen (NZL)	3.000	8.200	-3.0	8.200	
40	Abu Saeed Rafi (BAN)	2.500	7.500	-3.0	7.000	
41	Shishir Ahmed (BAN)	2.200	3.900	-4.0	2.100	

=== Final ===
The results are as follows:

Rank	Gymnast	Difficulty	Execution	Penalty	Total
1st place, gold medalist(s)	Joe Fraser (ENG)	6.100	8.733		14.833
2nd place, silver medalist(s)	Rhys McClenaghan (NIR)	5.600	8.533		14.133
3rd place, bronze medalist(s)	Jayson Rampersad (CAN)	5.900	8.100		14.000
4	Ethan Dick (NZL)	5.200	8.466		13.666
5	James Hall (ENG)	6.000	7.433		13.433
6	Jesse Moore (AUS)	6.400	6.966		13.366
7	Marios Georgiou (CYP)	6.100	7.066		13.166
8	Kenji Tamane (CAN)	4.400	6.433		10.833
