= Bulgaria at the World Artistic Gymnastics Championships =

- Flag of Bulgaria
- IOC code: BUL
- Medals: Gold 5 Silver 6 Bronze 13 Total 24

Bulgaria made their World Championships debut in 1934. However, it wasn't until 1974 when Andrey Keranov won Bulgaria its first medal, a bronze on floor exercise. In 1981 Zoya Grancharova became the first Bulgarian female artistic gymnast to win a medal at the World Championships, winning a bronze on floor exercise. Yordan Yovchev has won the most World Championship medals for Bulgaria; he won 13 medals between 1995 and 2009.

== Medalists ==
Medal	Name	Year	Event
Bronze	Andrey Keranov	(Bulgaria) 1974 Varna	Men's floor exercise
Bronze	Stoyan Deltchev	(France) 1978 Strasbourg	Men's pommel horse
Bronze	Stoyan Deltchev	(France) 1978 Strasbourg	Men's horizontal bar
Bronze	Zoya Grancharova	(Soviet Union) 1981 Moscow	Women's floor exercise
Gold	Boriana Stoyanova	(Hungary) 1983 Budapest	Women's vault
Bronze	Boriana Stoyanova	(Hungary) 1983 Budapest	Women's floor exercise
Bronze	Lubomir Geraskov	(Netherlands) 1987 Rotterdam	Men's floor exercise
Bronze	Lubomir Geraskov	(Netherlands) 1987 Rotterdam	Men's pommel horse
Bronze	Deyan Kolev	(Netherlands) 1987 Rotterdam	Men's vault
Bronze	Yordan Yovchev	(Japan) 1995 Sabae	Men's rings
Bronze	Krasimir Dunev	(Japan) 1995 Sabae	Men's horizontal bar
Silver	Yordan Yovchev	(Puerto Rico) 1996 San Juan	Men's rings
Silver	Krasimir Dunev	(Puerto Rico) 1996 San Juan	Men's horizontal bar
Bronze	Yordan Yovchev	(China) 1999 Tianjin	Men's all-around
Bronze	Yordan Yovchev	(Belgium) 2001 Ghent	Men's all-around
Gold	Yordan Yovchev	(Belgium) 2001 Ghent	Men's floor exercise
Gold	Yordan Yovchev	(Belgium) 2001 Ghent	Men's rings
Silver	Yordan Yovchev	(Hungary) 2002 Debrecen	Men's floor exercise
Silver	Yordan Yovchev	(Hungary) 2002 Debrecen	Men's rings
Gold	Yordan Yovchev	(United States) 2003 Anaheim	Men's floor exercise
Gold	Yordan Yovchev	(United States) 2003 Anaheim	Men's rings
Silver	Yordan Yovchev	(Denmark) 2006 Aarhus	Men's rings
Bronze	Yordan Yovchev	(Germany) 2007 Stuttgart	Men's rings
Silver	Yordan Yovchev	(United Kingdom) 2009 London	Men's rings

== Medal tables ==
=== By gender ===
Gender	Gold	Silver	Bronze	Total
Men	4	6	11	21
Women	1	0	2	3
