= Belgium at the World Artistic Gymnastics Championships =

- Flag of Belgium
- IOC code: BEL
- Medals: Gold 2 Silver 1 Bronze 4 Total 7

Belgian male gymnasts have participated at the World Championships since its creation in 1903. At the inaugural World Championships the Belgian team won the silver medal. In 2017 Nina Derwael won bronze on the uneven bars and became the first Belgian woman to win a World Championships medal. The following year Derwael won gold on the uneven bars, becoming Belgium's first World Champion in artistic gymnastics.

== Medalists ==
Medal	Name	Year	Event
Silver	Auguste van Ackere, Charles van Hulle, George Wiernickx, Eugène Dua, Charles Lannie, Jan Calson, Paul Mangin, Albert van de Roye, Francois Walravens	(Belgium) 1903 Antwerp	Men's team
Bronze	Jean de Hoe, Paul Mangin, Auguste van Ackere, Albert van de Roye, Leon van de Roye, Vital Verdickt	(France) 1905 Bordeaux	Men's team
Bronze	Karel Lannie, Herman Carsau, Leo Pauwels, Pol Giesenfeld, Paul Mangin, Louis de Winter	(Bohemia) 1907 Prague	Men's team
Bronze	Nina Derwael	(Canada) 2017 Montreal	Women's uneven bars
Gold	Nina Derwael	(Qatar) 2018 Doha	Women's uneven bars
Gold	Nina Derwael	(Germany) 2019 Stuttgart	Women's uneven bars
Bronze	Nina Derwael	(United Kingdom) 2022 Liverpool	Women's uneven bars
