= Helena Rakoczy =

Polish gymnast (1921–2014)

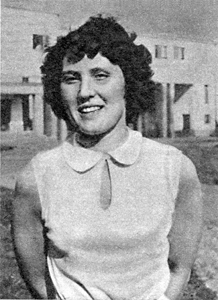
- Rakoczy in 1950

Personal information
- Born: 23 December 1921 Kraków, Poland
- Died: 2 September 2014 (aged 92) Kraków, Poland

Gymnastics career
- Discipline: Women's artistic gymnastics
- Country represented: Poland
Medal record
Olympic Games
Bronze medal – third place	1956 Melbourne	Team, portable apparatus
World Championships
Gold medal – first place	1950 Basel	Individual all-around
Gold medal – first place	1950 Basel	Vault
Gold medal – first place	1950 Basel	Balance Beam
Gold medal – first place	1950 Basel	Floor Exercise
Bronze medal – third place	1950 Basel	Uneven Bars
Bronze medal – third place	1954 Rome	Individual all-around
Bronze medal – third place	1954 Rome	Uneven Bars

Helena Rakoczy (née Krzynówek; 23 December 1921 – 2 September 2014) was a Polish artistic gymnast. She is a 1956 Olympic bronze medalist with the Polish team, as well as 4-time World champion and a 7-time World Championships medalist. She was born in Kraków, Poland.

== Career ==
Rakoczy trained at Sokół Kraków (1934–1939 and 1945–1946), Korona Kraków (1946–1954) and Wawel Kraków (1954–1975); coached by Celek Kozioł, Tadeusz Daniel and Urszula Stępińska.

Her fast-growing career was interrupted by the occupation of Poland in the years of 1939-1945. Throughout the years, Rakoczy won 26 national titles

In 1950, she competed at the 1950 World Artistic Gymnastics Championships in Basel and became the first and so far the only Polish gymnast ever to win the all-around title. She also took gold medals on vault, balance beam and floor exercise, as well as bronze on the uneven bars.

She later competed at the 1952 Summer Olympic Games in Helsinki. Disappointing performance in the qualifications, particularly on the uneven bars, kept her well out of the higher-finishing individuals in the all-around, where she came in 43rd place. She also failed to make any event finals, while the Polish team placed 8th. Her poor performances were caused by wrist injuries, as well as the stress she was dealing with due to predatory behaviour from the chef of the Polish Olympic team Apolinary Minecki. The assault that took place was stopped by the Polish Olympic swimmer and the European silver medalist Marek Petrusewicz.

In 1954, she won the all-around and vault bronze medals at the World Championships in Rome. As of right now, she is still the most decorated Polish gymnast, male or female, in the history of the sport.

In 1956, Rakoczy was a part of the Polish team at the 1956 Summer Olympic Games in Melbourne, alongside the 1959 European all-around champion Natalia Kot. Poland won a bronze medal in the team portable apparatus event, tying with the USSR team and finished fourth in the all-around team final behind USSR, Hungary and Romania. Individually, she finished 8th in the all-around, 7th on vault, 5th on the uneven bars, 16th on the balance beam and 14th on the floor exercise.

Rakoczy was inducted into the International Gymnastics Hall of Fame in 2004.

== Personal life ==
Rakoczy was born on 23 December 1921 in Kraków, Poland. After finishing her competitive career, she was the coach of the Polish National and Olympic teams in 1960, 1964 and 1972. She also coach in the United States, where she helped the Polish American gymnasts in Chicago, Detroit, Milwaukee, Toledo and Cleveland. She was also an international judge.

In May 2014, she became the patron of the Private Primary School and Kindergarder "Olympijczyk" in Gdańsk.

She died on 2 September 2014, in her hometown at the age of 92.
