= Gymnastics at the Island Games =

Gymnastics is an event at the Island Games, the biennial multi-sports event for island nations, territories and dependencies.

Gymnastics at the Island Games began in 1989 with Men joining the event from 1991.

Women's competitions

- Competition 1. Team Floor and Vault and Overall Team Floor and Vault. 5 competitors per Team. Best 4 scores to count.
- Competition 2. Individual and Overall apparatus. Maximum of 6 competitors per Member Island.
- Competition 3. Individual Set 4 piece Maximum of 6 competitors per Member Island.

Men's competitions

- Competition 1. Team Floor and Vault and Overall Team Floor and Vault 4 competitors per Team. Best 3 scores to count.
- Competition 2. Individual and Overall apparatus. Maximum of 6 competitors per Member Island.
- Competition 3. Individual Set 6 piece. Maximum of 6 competitors per Member Island.

Minimum age - 13

== Events ==
Event	III 1989	IV 1991	V 1993	VI 1995	VII 1997	VIII	IX 2001	X 2003	XI 2005	XII 2007	XIII 2009	XIV	XV 2013	XVI	XVII 2017	XVIII	XIX
Men's gymnastics
Individual all-around								X	X	X	X		X				
Floor		X	X	X	X		X	X	X	X	X		X		X		
Vault		X	X	X	X		X	X	X	X	X		X		X		
High bar					X		X	X	X	X	X		X		X		
Parallel bars					X		X	X	X	X	X		X		X		
Rings				X	X		X	X	X	X	X		X		X		
Pommel horse				X	X		X	X	X	X	X		X		X		
Tumbling			X														
Women's gymnastics
Individual all-around	X	X					X	X		X	X			X			
Floor		X	X	X	X		X	X	X	X	X		X		X		
Vault		X	X	X	X		X	X	X	X	X		X		X		
Uneven bars		X	X	X	X		X	X	X	X	X		X		X		
Balance beam		X	X	X	X		X	X	X	X	X		X		X		
Tumbling			X														

== Top Medalists ==
	Gold Medals		Total Medals	
	No:	Team	No:	Team
Men's Compulsory	21	Isle of Man	42	Isle of Man
Men's Team	5	Isle of Man	9	Faroe Islands
Men's Individual Apparatus	20	Isle of Man	55	Isle of Man
Women's Compulsory	11	Isle of Man	32	Isle of Man
Women's Team	7	Isle of Man	10	Isle of Man
Women's Individual Apparatus	14	Isle of Man	40	Isle of Man

== Men's ==
=== Men's Compulsory ===
Year	Games	Host	Event			
Year	Games	Host	Event	Gold	Silver	Bronze
1991	IV	Åland		Prince Edward Island	Iceland	Iceland
1993	V	Isle of Wight		Iceland	Iceland	Iceland
1995	VI	Gibraltar		Jersey	Isle of Man	Faroe Islands
1997	VII	Jersey		Jersey	Faroe Islands	Jersey
2001	IX	Isle of Man	Floor; Floor & Vault; Vault	Faroe Islands; Faroe Islands; Faroe Islands	Faroe Islands; Faroe Islands; Jersey	Isle of Man; Isle of Man; Faroe Islands Isle of Man
2003	X	Guernsey	Floor & Vault; Floor; Vault	Jersey IOM; Isle of Man; Jersey	Faroe Islands; Faroe Islands IOM Jersey	Faroe Islands; Jersey not awarded
2005	XI	Shetland	Floor & Vault; Floor; Vault	Isle of Man; Isle of Man; Faroe Islands	Isle of Man; Faroe Islands IOM; Gibraltar IOM	Faroe Islands not awarded not awarded
2009	XIII	Åland	Floor; Vault; High Bar; Bars; Rings; Pommel	Isle of Man; Faroe Islands IOM; Isle of Man; Isle of Man; Isle of Man; Isle of Man Isle of Man	Faroe Islands not awarded IOM Jersey; Faroe Islands; Jersey not awarded	Isle of Man; Isle of Man not awarded IOM Jersey; Faroe Islands IOM; Jersey
2013	XV	Bermuda	Floor; Vault; High Bar; Bars; Rings; Pommel	Isle of Man; Faroe Islands; Isle of Man; Isle of Man IOM; Isle of Man; Isle of Man	Isle of Man; Faroe Islands; Faroe Islands not awarded Faroe Islands; Isle of Man	Isle of Man; Faroe Islands; Isle of Man; Faroe Islands; IOM; Isle of Man
2017	XVII	Gotland	Floor Vault Horiz Bar; Bars Rings Pommel	Jersey Faroe Islands Isle of Man Jersey; Isle of Man; Faroe Islands Isle of Man Jersey; Jersey Isle of Man	Ynys Môn not awarded Faroe Islands not awarded Faroe Islands Isle of Man; Faroe Islands	Faroe Islands Jersey not awarded Faroe Islands not awarded not awarded Isle of Man

=== Men's Floor & Vault ===
Year	Games	Host			
Year	Games	Host	Gold	Silver	Bronze
1993	V	IOW	Iceland	Iceland	Iceland
1995	VI	Gibraltar	IOM	Faroe Islands	(Anglesey) Ynys Môn
1997	VII	Jersey	Jersey	Faroe Islands	Jersey
2005	XI	Shetland	Jersey	Faroe Islands	IOM

=== Men's Floor & Vault Team Event ===
Year	Games	Host	Event			
Year	Games	Host	Event	Gold	Silver	Bronze
1997	VII	Jersey		Jersey	Faroe Islands	Gibraltar
2001	IX	Isle of Man		IOM	Faroe Islands	Jersey
2003	X	Guernsey		IOM	Faroe Islands	(Anglesey) Ynys Môn
2005	XI	Shetland	Floor & Vault; Floor; Vault	IOM; IOM; Faroe Islands Jersey	Faroe Islands; Faroe Islands	Jersey; Jersey; IOM
2009	XIII	Åland		IOM	Faroe Islands	
2013	XV	Bermuda		Faroe Islands	IOM	
2017	XVII	Gotland		Faroe Islands	Jersey	Isle of Man

=== Men's Individual Apparatus ===
Year	Games	Host	Event			
Year	Games	Host	Event	Gold	Silver	Bronze
1993	V	IOW	Total; Floor; Vault; Rings	Iceland; Iceland; Jersey; Iceland	Iceland; Iceland; Iceland; Iceland	Jersey; Jersey; Iceland; Jersey
1997	VII	Jersey	Floor; Vault; Rings; Bars; High Bars	Jersey; Jersey Jersey; Jersey; Jersey; Jersey	Faroe Islands; Jersey; Jersey; Jersey	Faroe Islands; Faroe Islands Faroe Islands; Faroe Islands; Jersey; Jersey
2001	IX	Isle of Man	Floor; High Bars; Pommel; Rings; Vault	Faroe Islands; Faroe Islands; Jersey; Faroe Islands; Faroe Islands	Faroe Islands; Jersey; Jersey; Faroe Islands; Jersey	Jersey; Isle of Man; Isle of Man; Faroe Islands; Faroe Islands
2003	X	Guernsey	Floor; Vault; High Bar; Bars; Rings; Pommel	Isle of Man; Isle of Man; Isle of Man; Jersey; Faroe Islands; Jersey	Isle of Man; Faroe Islands; Jersey; Faroe Islands; Faroe Islands; Isle of Man Jersey	Faroe Islands; Jersey; Isle of Man; Faroe Islands; Isle of Man not awarded
2005	XI	Shetland	Floor; Vault; High Bar; Bars; Rings; Pommel; Overall	Faroe Islands IOM; Isle of Man; Isle of Man; Faroe Islands; Isle of Man; Jersey; Isle of Man	not awarded Isle of Man; Faroe Islands; Isle of Man; Isle of Man; Isle of Man IOM; Isle of Man	Isle of Man; Faroe Islands not awarded Isle of Man
2009	XIII	Åland	Floor; Vault; High Bar; Bars; Rings; Pommel; Overall	Isle of Man; Isle of Man; Isle of Man; Jersey; Isle of Man; Isle of Man; Isle of Man	Isle of Man; Isle of Man; Jersey; Isle of Man; Jersey; IOM Jersey; Jersey	Faroe Islands; Faroe Islands; Isle of Man; Faroe Islands; Faroe Islands not awarded Isle of Man
2013	XV	Bermuda	Floor; Vault; High Bar; Bars; Rings; Pommel; Overall	Isle of Man; Faroe Islands; Isle of Man; Isle of Man; Faroe Islands; Isle of Man; Isle of Man	Faroe Islands; Isle of Man; Isle of Man; Faroe Islands; Faroe Islands; Isle of Man; Isle of Man	Isle of Man; Faroe Islands; Isle of Man; Isle of Man; Faroe Islands IOM; Isle of Man; Isle of Man
2017	XVII	Gotland	Floor; Vault; Horiz Bar; Bars; Rings; Pommel; Overall	Jersey; Faroe Islands Isle of Man; Jersey; Jersey; Jersey; Jersey; Jersey	Faroe Islands not awarded Faroe Islands; Faroe Islands; Faroe Islands; Faroe Islands; Faroe Islands	Faroe Islands; Faroe Islands Jersey; Isle of Man; Isle of Man; Isle of Man; Isle of Man; Isle of Man

=== Men's Tumbling ===
Year	Games	Host			
Year	Games	Host	Gold	Silver	Bronze
1993	V	Isle of Wight	Iceland	Jersey	Isle of Wight

== Women's ==
=== Women's Compulsory ===
Year	Games	Host	Event			
Year	Games	Host	Event	Gold	Silver	Bronze
1989	III	Faroe Islands		Åland	Jersey	Åland
1991	IV	Åland		Iceland; Åland		Jersey
1993	V	IOW		Iceland	Iceland	Åland
1995	VI	Gibraltar		Åland	Iceland	Åland
1997	VII	Jersey		Åland Åland		Jersey
2001	IX	Isle of Man	Floor Floor & Vault Vault	IOM Faroe Islands; IOM Faroe Islands; Jersey	not awarded not awarded Faroe Islands IOM	Isle of Man Guernsey not awarded
2003	X	Guernsey	Floor & Vault; Floor; Vault	Isle of Man; Isle of Man; Bermuda	Isle of Man; Isle of Man; Isle of Man	Isle of Man; Isle of Man; Isle of Man
2005	XI	Shetland	Floor & Vault; Floor; Vault	Bermuda; Bermuda; Bermuda IOM	Isle of Man; Isle of Man not awarded	Bermuda; Bermuda; Bermuda
2009	XIII	Åland	Floor; Vault; A Bars; Beam	Bermuda; Bermuda; Bermuda; Bermuda	Isle of Man; Bermuda (Anglesey) Ynys Môn; Bermuda; Faroe Islands	Isle of Man not awarded Isle of Man; Bermuda Menorca
2013	XV	Bermuda	Floor; Vault; A Bars; Beam	Isle of Man; Isle of Man; Bermuda IOM; Bermuda	Isle of Man; Cayman Islands Isle of Man	Jersey; Isle of Man; Bermuda IOM; Jersey
2017	XVII	Gotland	Floor; Vault A Bars; Beam	Isle of Man; Isle of Man Jersey; Isle of Man	Isle of Man; Bermuda Bermuda Isle of Man; Isle of Man; Bermuda	Bermuda not awarded Isle of Man; Jersey

=== Women's Floor & Vault ===
Year	Games	Host			
Year	Games	Host	Gold	Silver	Bronze
1989	III	Faroe Islands	Isle of Wight	Jersey	Jersey
1991	IV	Åland	Åland	Iceland	Jersey
1993	V	Isle of Wight	Iceland	Iceland	Åland
1995	VI	Gibraltar	Isle of Man	Åland; Åland	not awarded
2005	XI	Shetland	Isle of Man	Bermuda Bermuda Isle of Man Isle of Man	not awarded

=== Women's Floor & Vault Team Event ===
Year	Games	Host	Event			
Year	Games	Host	Event	Gold	Silver	Bronze
1995	VI	Gibraltar		Iceland; Jersey		Isle of Man
1997	VII	Jersey		Jersey	Åland	Isle of Man
2001	IX	Isle of Man		Isle of Man	Åland	Jersey
2003	X	Guernsey		Isle of Man	Bermuda	Jersey
2005	XI	Shetland	Floor & Vault; Floor; Vault	Isle of Man; Isle of Man; Isle of Man	Bermuda; Bermuda; Bermuda	Faroe Islands; Åland Faroe Islands; Faroe Islands
2009	XIII	Åland		Bermuda	Isle of Man	Faroe Islands
2013	XV	Bermuda		Isle of Man	Bermuda	Faroe Islands
2019	XVII	Gotland		Isle of Man	Bermuda	Faroe Islands

=== Women's Individual Apparatus ===
Year	Games	Host	Event			
Year	Games	Host	Event	Gold	Silver	Bronze
1991	IV	Åland	Total	Iceland	Åland	Jersey
1993	V	Isle of Wight	Total; Floor; Vault; A/Bars; Beam	Iceland; Jersey; Iceland; Iceland; Iceland	Iceland; Iceland; Iceland; Iceland; Iceland	Iceland; Iceland Iceland Jersey; Åland; Iceland; Jersey
1995	VI	Gibraltar	Floor; Vault; A/Bars; Beam	Iceland; Isle of Man; Iceland; Iceland	Iceland; Åland; Iceland; Åland	Åland Åland; Iceland; Isle of Man; Åland
1997	VII	Jersey	Vault; A/Bars; Beam; Floor	Åland; Jersey; Åland; Åland	Jersey; Jersey; Åland; Åland	Jersey; Åland; Jersey; Isle of Man
2001	IX	Isle of Man	Bars; Beam; Floor; Vault	Åland; Åland; Isle of Man; Åland	Isle of Man; Isle of Man; Isle of Man; Isle of Man	Isle of Man; Jersey; Åland; Isle of Man
2003	X	Guernsey	Floor; Vault; A/Bars; Beam	Bermuda; Isle of Man; Bermuda; Bermuda	Bermuda IOM; Bermuda; Bermuda Bermuda; Bermuda	not awarded Bermuda not awarded Isle of Man
2005	XI	Shetland	Floor; Vault; A Bars; Beam; Overall	Bermuda; Bermuda Isle of Man; Bermuda; Bermuda; Bermuda	Bermuda not awarded Bermuda; Bermuda; Bermuda	Isle of Man; Bermuda; Bermuda; Bermuda; Bermuda
2009	XIII	Åland	Floor; Vault; A Bars; Beam; Overall	Bermuda; Bermuda; Isle of Man; Bermuda; Isle of Man	Isle of Man; Bermuda; Bermuda; Isle of Man; Isle of Man	Bermuda Bermuda; Bermuda; Bermuda Bermuda; Bermuda; Isle of Man
2013	XV	Bermuda	Floor; Vault; A Bars; Beam; Overall	Isle of Man; Isle of Man; Jersey; Isle of Man; Isle of Man	Isle of Man; Isle of Man; Isle of Man Jersey; Isle of Man; Jersey	Isle of Man; Isle of Man Jersey not awarded Bermuda; Isle of Man
2019	XVII	Gotland	Floor; Vault; A Bars; Beam; Overall	Isle of Man; Isle of Man; Bermuda; Isle of Man; Isle of Man	Isle of Man; Isle of Man; Isle of Man; Bermuda; Isle of Man	Jersey; Åland Islands Faroe Islands; Bermuda; Bermuda; Bermuda

=== Women's Tumbling ===
Year	Games	Host			
Year	Games	Host	Gold	Silver	Bronze
1993	V	Isle of Wight	Iceland	Åland	Isle of Wight
