= North Korea at the World Artistic Gymnastics Championships =

- Flag of North Korea
- IOC code: PRK
- Medals: Gold 8 Silver 3 Bronze 3 Total 14

In 1991 Kim Gwang-suk won the first medal, a gold on uneven bars, for North Korea at the World Championships. However, her win became controversial when it was discovered that North Korean officials had falsified her birth year as it was listed as 15 for three years in a row. Although the International Gymnastics Federation punished the North Korean gymnastics federation by barring their women's team from competing at the 1993 World Championships, they did allow Kim to keep her medal. North Korea faced further age-falsification controversy when it was discovered that 2007 World silver medalist Hong Su-jong had listed three different birth years (1989, 1985 and 1986) between 2003 and 2010.

Pae Gil-su became the first North Korean man to win a World Championships medal, winning gold on pommel horse in 1992.

== Medalists ==
Medal	Name	Year	Event
Gold	Kim Gwang-suk	(United States) 1991 Indianapolis	Women's uneven bars
Gold	Pae Gil-su	(France) 1992 Paris	Men's pommel horse
Gold	Pae Gil-su	(United Kingdom) 1993 Birmingham	Men's pommel horse
Gold	Pae Gil-su	(Puerto Rico) 1996 San Juan	Men's pommel horse
Bronze	Pae Gil-su	(Switzerland) 1997 Lausanne	Men's pommel horse
Silver	Kang Yun-mi	(United States) 2003 Anaheim	Women's vault
Silver	Hong Su-jong	(Germany) 2007 Stuttgart	Women's vault
Bronze	Ri Se-gwang	(Germany) 2007 Stuttgart	Men's vault
Bronze	Hong Un-jong	(Belgium) 2013 Antwerp	Women's vault
Gold	Hong Un-jong	(China) 2014 Nanning	Women's vault
Gold	Ri Se-gwang	(China) 2014 Nanning	Men's vault
Silver	Hong Un-jong	(United Kingdom) 2015 Glasgow	Women's vault
Gold	Ri Se-gwang	(United Kingdom) 2015 Glasgow	Men's vault
Gold	Ri Se-gwang	(Qatar) 2018 Doha	Men's vault

== Medal tables ==
=== By gender ===
Gender	Gold	Silver	Bronze	Total
Men	6	0	2	8
Women	2	3	1	6
