= Uzbekistan at the World Artistic Gymnastics Championships =

- Flag of Uzbekistan
- IOC code: UZB
- Medals: Gold 1 Silver 2 Bronze 3 Total 6

Uzbekistan first competed at the 1993 World Championships, after the fall of the Soviet Union. At this competition Oksana Chusovitina won Uzbekistan its first World Championships medal, a bronze on vault. Ten years later at the 2003 World Championships, Chusovitina would win Uzbekistan its first World Championships gold medal. At the 2007 World Championships Anton Fokin would become the first Uzbek male gymnast to win a World Championships medal, a bronze on parallel bars.

== Medalists ==
Medal	Name	Year	Event
Bronze	Oksana Chusovitina	(United Kingdom) 1993 Birmingham	Women's vault
Silver	Oksana Chusovitina	(Belgium) 2001 Ghent	Women's vault
Bronze	Oksana Chusovitina	(Hungary) 2002 Debrecen	Women's vault
Gold	Oksana Chusovitina	(United States) 2003 Anaheim	Women's vault
Silver	Oksana Chusovitina	(Australia) 2005 Melbourne	Women's vault
Bronze	Anton Fokin	(Germany) 2007 Stuttgart	Men's parallel bars
