= Greece at the World Artistic Gymnastics Championships =

- Flag of Greece
- IOC code: GRE
- Website: www.ego-gymnastics.gr
- Medals: Gold 7 Silver 4 Bronze 2 Total 13

Although Greece has had successful athletes at the Olympic Games, winning medals as early as the first ever Olympic Games, a Greek gymnast would not win a World Championships medal until Ioannis Melissanidis won silver on floor exercise at the 1994 World Championships. As of 2026 only male artistic gymnastics have won World Championship medals for Greece.

== Medalists ==
Medal	Name	Year	Event
Silver	Ioannis Melissanidis	(Australia) 1994 Brisbane	Men's floor exercise
Bronze	Dimosthenis Tampakos	(China) 1999 Tianjin	Men's rings
Gold	Vlasios Maras	(Belgium) 2001 Ghent	Men's horizontal bar
Gold	Vlasios Maras	(Hungary) 2002 Debrecen	Men's horizontal bar
Gold	Dimosthenis Tampakos	(United States) 2003 Anaheim	Men's rings
Bronze	Vlasios Maras	(Denmark) 2006 Aarhus	Men's horizontal bar
Gold	Eleftherios Kosmidis	(Netherlands) 2010 Rotterdam	Men's floor exercise
Silver	Vasileios Tsolakidis	(Japan) 2011 Tokyo	Men's parallel bars
Gold	Eleftherios Petrounias	(United Kingdom) 2015 Glasgow	Men's rings
Gold	Eleftherios Petrounias	(Canada) 2017 Montreal	Men's rings
Gold	Eleftherios Petrounias	(Qatar) 2018 Doha	Men's rings
Silver	Eleftherios Petrounias	(Belgium) 2023 Antwerp	Men's rings
Silver	Eleftherios Petrounias	(Netherlands) 2026 Rotterdam	Men's rings
