= Spain at the World Artistic Gymnastics Championships =

- Flag of Spain
- IOC code: ESP
- Medals: Gold 3 Silver 3 Bronze 2 Total 8

At the 1996 World Championships, held in San Juan, Puerto Rico, Jesús Carballo won Spain its first medal at the World Championships, a gold on horizontal bar. At the 2002 World Championships Elena Gómez became the first female Spanish gymnast to win a World Championships medal, winning gold on floor exercise. At that same World Championships Gervasio Deferr had initially won the silver medal on men's floor exercise; however he was stripped of the medal the following year after testing positive for marijuana.

== Medalists ==
Medal	Name	Year	Event
Gold	Jesús Carballo	(Puerto Rico) 1996 San Juan	Men's horizontal bar
Silver	Jesús Carballo	(Switzerland) 1997 Lausanne	Men's horizontal bar
Silver	Gervasio Deferr	(China) 1999 Tianjin	Men's floor exercise
Gold	Jesús Carballo	(China) 1999 Tianjin	Men's horizontal bar
Gold	Elena Gómez	(Hungary) 2002 Debrecen	Women's floor exercise
Bronze	Elena Gómez	(United States) 2003 Anaheim	Women's floor exercise
Silver	Gervasio Deferr	(Germany) 2007 Stuttgart	Men's floor exercise
Bronze	Rayderley Zapata	(United Kingdom) 2015 Glasgow	Men's floor exercise
