= Turkey at the World Artistic Gymnastics Championships =

- Flag of Turkey
- IOC code: TUR
- Medals: Gold 2 Silver 2 Bronze 0 Total 4

Turkey had sent their first men's team to the 1962 World Championships where they finished twentieth. In 2018 they sent a full team for women's artistic gymnastics for the first time. At the 2019 World Championships, İbrahim Çolak became the first Turkish athlete to not only win a World Championships medal, but to become a World Champion, doing so on rings. At that same competition Ahmet Önder won a silver on parallel bars the following day.

== Medalists ==
Medal	Name	Year	Event
Gold	İbrahim Çolak	(Germany) 2019 Stuttgart	Men's rings
Silver	Ahmet Önder	(Germany) 2019 Stuttgart	Men's parallel bars
Gold	Adem Asil	(United Kingdom) 2022 Liverpool	Men's rings
Silver	Adem Asil	(Indonesia) 2025 Jakarta	Men's rings
