= Philippines at the World Artistic Gymnastics Championships =

- Flag of the Philippines
- IOC code: PHI
- National federation: Gymnastics Association of the Philippines
- Medals: Gold 3 Silver 2 Bronze 3 Total 8

Filipino gymnasts has competed at the World Championships. The first ever medal won for the Philippines was the bronze by Carlos Yulo at in the 2018 edition in Doha.

== Medalists ==
Medal	Name	Year	Event
Bronze	Carlos Yulo	(Qatar) 2018 Doha	Men's floor exercise
Gold	Carlos Yulo	(Germany) 2019 Stuttgart	Men's floor exercise
Gold	Carlos Yulo	(Japan) 2021 Kitakyushu	Men's vault
Silver	Carlos Yulo	(Japan) 2021 Kitakyushu	Men's parallel bars
Silver	Carlos Yulo	(United Kingdom) 2022 Liverpool	Men's vault
Bronze	Carlos Yulo	(United Kingdom) 2022 Liverpool	Men's parallel bars
Bronze	Carlos Yulo	(Indonesia) 2025 Jakarta	Men's floor exercise
Gold	Carlos Yulo	(Indonesia) 2025 Jakarta	Men's vault

== Medal tables ==
=== By event ===
Event	Gold	Silver	Bronze	Total
Men's vault	2	1	0	3
Men's floor exercise	1	0	2	3
Men's parallel bars	0	1	1	2

== Participants ==
=== Men's artistic gymnastics ===
- 2011: Jean Nathan Monteclaro and Christian Monteclaro
- 2013: None
- 2014: None
- 2015: Reyland Capellan
- 2017: None
- 2018: Carlos Yulo
- 2019: Carlos Yulo
- 2021: Carlos Yulo
- 2022: Carlos Yulo
- 2023: Carlos Yulo
- 2025: Carlos Yulo, Miguel Besana, and Ivan Cruz

=== Women's artistic gymnastics ===
The Philippines qualified their first female gymnasts for the 2023 edition.

- 2023: Aleah Finnegan and Kylee Kvamme
- 2025: Aleah Finnegan, Haylee Garcia, Emma Malabuyo and Elaiza Yulo

== Junior World medalists ==
Medal	Name	Year	Event
Bronze	Eldrew Yulo	(Philippines) 2025 Manila	Boys' floor exercise
Bronze	Eldrew Yulo	(Philippines) 2025 Manila	Boys' horizontal bar
