= Cuba at the World Artistic Gymnastics Championships =

- Flag of Cuba
- IOC code: CUB
- Medals: Gold 0 Silver 2 Bronze 3 Total 5

At the 1996 World Championships, Annia Portuondo became the first Cuban gymnast to win a medal, earning bronze on vault. Five years later at the 2001 World Championships Charles León Tamayo and Erick López would become the first male Cuban gymnasts to win a medal at the World Championships, earning bronze on vault and silver on parallel bars respectively.

During the 2003 World Championships, which took place in Anaheim, California, three Cuban gymnasts defected. As a result, Cuba opted to stop sending gymnasts to the World Championships or Olympic Games. Cuban gymnasts would later return to these large international competitions, starting with the 2015 World Championships. At this competition Manrique Larduet won two medals, a silver in the all-around and bronze on horizontal bar.

== Medalists ==
Medal	Name	Year	Event
Bronze	Annia Portuondo	(Puerto Rico) 1996 San Juan	Women's vault
Bronze	Charles León Tamayo	(Belgium) 2001 Ghent	Men's vault
Silver	Erick López	(Belgium) 2001 Ghent	Men's parallel bars
Silver	Manrique Larduet	(United Kingdom) 2015 Glasgow	Men's all-around
Bronze	Manrique Larduet	(United Kingdom) 2015 Glasgow	Men's horizontal bar
