= South Korea at the World Artistic Gymnastics Championships =

- Flag of South Korea
- IOC code: KOR
- Medals: Gold 6 Silver 2 Bronze 4 Total 12

Yoo Ok-ryul won South Korea their first medal at the World Championships in artistic gymnastics in 1991. In 2023 Yeo Seo-jeong became the first South Korean woman to win a World Championship medal, winning bronze on vault.

== Medalists ==
Medal	Name	Year	Event
Gold	Yoo Ok-ryul	(United States) 1991 Indianapolis	Men's vault
Gold	Yoo Ok-ryul	(France) 1992 Paris	Men's vault
Bronze	Yoo Ok-ryul	(United Kingdom) 1993 Birmingham	Men's vault
Bronze	Yeo Hong-chul	(Australia) 1994 Brisbane	Men's vault
Silver	Yeo Hong-chul	(Puerto Rico) 1996 San Juan	Men's vault
Gold	Lee Joo-hyung	(China) 1999 Tianjin	Men's parallel bars
Silver	Yoo Won-chul	(Denmark) 2006 Aarhus	Men's parallel bars
Gold	Kim Dae-eun	(Germany) 2007 Stuttgart	Men's parallel bars
Gold	Yang Hak-seon	(Japan) 2011 Tokyo	Men's vault
Gold	Yang Hak-seon	(Belgium) 2013 Antwerp	Men's vault
Bronze	Kim Han-sol	(Canada) 2017 Montreal	Men's vault
Bronze	Yeo Seo-jeong	(Belgium) 2023 Antwerp	Women's vault

== Junior World medalists ==
Medal	Name	Year	Event
Gold	Ryu Sung-hyun	(Hungary) 2019 Győr	Boys' floor exercise
