= Great Britain at the World Artistic Gymnastics Championships =

- Flag of Great Britain
- IOC code: GBR
- Website: www.british-gymnastics.org
- Medals: Gold 11 Silver 16 Bronze 15 Total 42

Although British gymnasts competed at numerous Olympic Games as early as 1908, they did not compete at a World Championships until 1966. Neil Thomas won Great Britain's first world medal, a silver on floor exercise, at the 1993 World Championships.

The emergence of Beth Tweddle in the early 2000's, followed by Louis Smith and Daniel Keatings in male gymnastics, began a period of increasing success for British gymnasts at global level as the nation moved from an also-ran, through a middle power, and into one of the major forces in the sport. At the 2015 World Championships both men and women won their first team medals, a silver and bronze respectively. As of 2025, Six British gymnasts have won eleven World titles, all since 2000; Beth Tweddle (twice on uneven bars, once on floor), Max Whitlock (three times on pommel horse), Jake Jarman (once on vault, once on floor), Joe Fraser (on parallel bars) Jessica Gadirova and Giarnni Regini-Moran (both on floor). British gymnasts have also won at least one medal on every apparatus, including both team and both individual all-arounds, except for balance beam.

== Medallists ==
Medal	Name	Year	Event
Silver	Neil Thomas	(United Kingdom) 1993 Birmingham	Men's floor exercise
Silver	Neil Thomas	(Australia) 1994 Brisbane	Men's floor exercise
Bronze	Beth Tweddle	(United States) 2003 Anaheim	Women's uneven bars
Bronze	Beth Tweddle	(Australia) 2005 Melbourne	Women's uneven bars
Gold	Beth Tweddle	(Denmark) 2006 Aarhus	Women's uneven bars
Bronze	Louis Smith	(Germany) 2007 Stuttgart	Men's pommel horse
Silver	Dan Keatings	(United Kingdom) 2009 London	Men's all-around
Gold	Beth Tweddle	(United Kingdom) 2009 London	Women's floor exercise
Bronze	Daniel Purvis	(Netherlands) 2010 Rotterdam	Men's floor exercise
Silver	Louis Smith	(Netherlands) 2010 Rotterdam	Men's pommel horse
Gold	Beth Tweddle	(Netherlands) 2010 Rotterdam	Women's uneven bars
Bronze	Louis Smith	(Japan) 2011 Tokyo	Men's pommel horse
Silver	Max Whitlock	(Belgium) 2013 Antwerp	Men's pommel horse
Bronze	Kristian Thomas	(Belgium) 2013 Antwerp	Men's vault
Silver	Max Whitlock	(China) 2014 Nanning	Men's all-around
Silver	Brinn Bevan, Daniel Purvis, Louis Smith, Kristian Thomas, Max Whitlock, Nile Wilson, James Hall	(United Kingdom) 2015 Glasgow	Men's team
Bronze	Becky Downie, Ellie Downie, Claudia Fragapane, Ruby Harrold, Kelly Simm, Amy Tinkler, Charlie Fellows	(United Kingdom) 2015 Glasgow	Women's team
Silver	Max Whitlock	(United Kingdom) 2015 Glasgow	Men's floor exercise
Gold	Max Whitlock	(United Kingdom) 2015 Glasgow	Men's pommel horse
Silver	Louis Smith	(United Kingdom) 2015 Glasgow	Men's pommel horse
Gold	Max Whitlock	(Canada) 2017 Montreal	Men's pommel horse
Bronze	Claudia Fragapane	(Canada) 2017 Montreal	Women's floor exercise
Silver	Max Whitlock	(Qatar) 2018 Doha	Men's pommel horse
Bronze	Ellie Downie	(Germany) 2019 Stuttgart	Women's vault
Gold	Max Whitlock	(Germany) 2019 Stuttgart	Men's pommel horse
Silver	Becky Downie	(Germany) 2019 Stuttgart	Women's uneven bars
Gold	Joe Fraser	(Germany) 2019 Stuttgart	Men's parallel bars
Bronze	Joe Fraser, James Hall, Jake Jarman, Giarnni Regini-Moran, Courtney Tulloch, Adam Tobin	(United Kingdom) 2022 Liverpool	Men's team
Silver	Ondine Achampong, Georgia-Mae Fenton, Jennifer Gadirova, Jessica Gadirova, Alice Kinsella, Poppy-Grace Stickler	(United Kingdom) 2022 Liverpool	Women's team
Bronze	Jessica Gadirova	(United Kingdom) 2022 Liverpool	Women's all-around
Gold	Giarnni Regini-Moran	(United Kingdom) 2022 Liverpool	Men's floor exercise
Bronze	Courtney Tulloch	(United Kingdom) 2022 Liverpool	Men's rings
Gold	Jessica Gadirova	(United Kingdom) 2022 Liverpool	Women's floor exercise
Gold	Jake Jarman	(Belgium) 2023 Antwerp	Men's vault
Gold	Jake Jarman	(Indonesia) 2025 Jakarta	Men's floor exercise
Silver	Luke Whitehouse	(Indonesia) 2025 Jakarta	Men's floor exercise
Silver	Ruby Evans	(Indonesia) 2025 Jakarta	Women's floor exercise
Bronze	Abigail Martin	(Indonesia) 2025 Jakarta	Women's floor exercise
Bronze	Joe Fraser	(Indonesia) 2025 Jakarta	Men's horizontal bar
Bronze	Joe Fraser	(Netherlands) 2026 Rotterdam	Men's all-around
Silver	Jake Jarman	(Netherlands) 2026 Rotterdam	Men's floor exercise
Silver	Jake Jarman	(Netherlands) 2026 Rotterdam	Men's vault

== Medal tables ==
=== By gender ===
Gender	Gold	Silver	Bronze	Total
Men	7	13	8	28
Women	4	3	7	14

=== By event ===
Event	Gold	Silver	Bronze	Total
Men's pommel horse	3	4	2	9
Men's floor exercise	2	5	1	8
Women's floor exercise	2	1	2	5
Women's uneven bars	2	1	2	5
Men's vault	1	1	1	3
Men's parallel bars	1	0	0	1
Men's individual all-around	0	2	1	3
Men's team	0	1	1	2
Women's team	0	1	1	2
Men's horizontal bar	0	0	1	1
Men's rings	0	0	1	1
Women's individual all-around	0	0	1	1
Women's vault	0	0	1	1
Women's balance beam	0	0	0	0

== Junior World medallists ==
Medal	Name	Year	Event
Silver	Jennifer Gadirova	(Hungary) 2019 Győr	Girls' vault
Bronze	Jasper Smith-Gordon	(Hungary) 2019 Győr	Boys' vault
Silver	Sol Scott	(Philippines) 2025 Manila	Boys' vault
Bronze	Evan McPhillips	(Philippines) 2025 Manila	Boys' vault

== See also ==
- Great Britain men's national artistic gymnastics team
- Great Britain women's national artistic gymnastics team
- List of Olympic female artistic gymnasts for Great Britain
