= Canada at the World Artistic Gymnastics Championships =

- Flag of Canada
- IOC code: CAN
- Website: gymcan.org
- Medals: Gold 0 Silver 8 Bronze 6 Total 14

Canada first participated at the 1962 World Championships. It wasn't until 1987 when a Canadian gymnast, Curtis Hibbert, won Canada's first medal. In 2006 Elyse Hopfner-Hibbs became the first female artistic gymnast to win a medal for Canada. In 2022 the Canadian women's team won their first team medal, a bronze.

== Medalists ==
| Medal | Name | Year | Event |
|---|---|---|---|
| Silver | Curtis Hibbert | (Netherlands) 1987 Rotterdam | Men's horizontal bar |
| Bronze | Curtis Hibbert | (France) 1992 Paris | Men's vault |
| Silver | Alexander Jeltkov | (China) 1999 Tianjin | Men's horizontal bar |
| Bronze | Kyle Shewfelt | (United States) 2003 Anaheim | Men's floor exercise |
| Bronze | Kyle Shewfelt | (United States) 2003 Anaheim | Men's vault |
| Silver | Brandon O'Neill | (Australia) 2005 Melbourne | Men's floor exercise |
| Bronze | Kyle Shewfelt | (Denmark) 2006 Aarhus | Men's floor exercise |
| Bronze | Elyse Hopfner-Hibbs | (Denmark) 2006 Aarhus | Women's balance beam |
| Silver | Ellie Black | (Canada) 2017 Montreal | Women's all-around |
| Silver | Shallon Olsen | (Qatar) 2018 Doha | Women's vault |
| Silver | Ana Padurariu | (Qatar) 2018 Doha | Women's balance beam |
| Bronze | Ellie Black, Laurie Denommée, Denelle Pedrick, Emma Spence, Sydney Turner, Shallon Olsen | (United Kingdom) 2022 Liverpool | Women's team |
| Silver | Ellie Black | (United Kingdom) 2022 Liverpool | Women's balance beam |
| Silver | Lia Monica Fontaine | (Indonesia) 2025 Jakarta | Women's vault |

== Medal tables ==
=== By gender ===
| Gender | Gold | Silver | Bronze | Total |
|---|---|---|---|---|
| Women | 0 | 5 | 2 | 7 |
| Men | 0 | 3 | 4 | 7 |

== Junior World medalists ==
| Medal | Name | Year | Event |
|---|---|---|---|
| Silver | Félix Dolci | (Hungary) 2019 Győr | Boys' floor exercise |
| Gold | Félix Dolci | (Hungary) 2019 Győr | Boy's rings |
| Silver | Victor Canuel | (Turkey) 2023 Antalya | Boys' vault |
| Bronze | Cristella Brunetti-Burns | (Turkey) 2023 Antalya | Girls' balance beam |
