= France at the World Artistic Gymnastics Championships =

- Flag of France
- IOC code: FRA
- Website: www.ffgym.fr
- Medals: Gold 25 Silver 30 Bronze 28 Total 83

France has been participating at the World Championships in artistic gymnastics since its inception in 1903. Their men's team won the first ever team gold medal. Women first competed at the World Championships in 1934; the French women's team placed fourth. They would win their first team medal, a silver, in 1950.

== Medalists ==
Medal	Name	Year	Event
Gold	Allégre, Joseph Bollet, Georges Charmoille, Daube, Georges Dejaeghère, Jules Lecoutre, Joseph Lux, Joseph Martinez, Pierre Payssé	(Belgium) 1903 Antwerp	Men's team
Gold	Joseph Martinez	(Belgium) 1903 Antwerp	Men's all-around
Silver	Joseph Lux	(Belgium) 1903 Antwerp	Men's all-around
Gold	Georges Dejaeghère	(Belgium) 1903 Antwerp	Men's pommel horse
Gold	Joseph Lux	(Belgium) 1903 Antwerp	Men's pommel horse
Gold	Joseph Martinez	(Belgium) 1903 Antwerp	Men's rings
Silver	Joseph Lux	(Belgium) 1903 Antwerp	Men's rings
Gold	Joseph Martinez	(Belgium) 1903 Antwerp	Men's parallel bars
Gold	Joseph Martinez	(Belgium) 1903 Antwerp	Men's horizontal bar
Silver	Jules Lecoutre	(Belgium) 1903 Antwerp	Men's horizontal bar
Silver	Pierre Payssé	(Belgium) 1903 Antwerp	Men's horizontal bar
Gold	Georges Dejagere, Lucien Démanet, Marcel Lalu, Daniel Lavielle, Joseph Martinez, Pierre Payssé	(France) 1905 Bordeaux	Men's team
Gold	Marcel Lalu	(France) 1905 Bordeaux	Men's all-around
Silver	Daniel Lavielle	(France) 1905 Bordeaux	Men's all-around
Bronze	Lucien Démanet	(France) 1905 Bordeaux	Men's all-around
Gold	Georges Dejaeghère	(France) 1905 Bordeaux	Men's pommel horse
Silver	Marcel Lalue	(France) 1905 Bordeaux	Men's pommel horse
Bronze	Daniel Lavielle	(France) 1905 Bordeaux	Men's pommel horse
Gold	Joseph Martinez	(France) 1905 Bordeaux	Men's parallel bars
Gold	Marcel Lalue	(France) 1905 Bordeaux	Men's parallel bars
Bronze	Pierre Payssé	(France) 1905 Bordeaux	Men's parallel bars
Gold	Marcel Lalue	(France) 1905 Bordeaux	Men's horizontal bar
Silver	Joseph Martinez	(France) 1905 Bordeaux	Men's horizontal bar
Bronze	Pierre Payssé	(France) 1905 Bordeaux	Men's horizontal bar
Bronze	Lucien Démanet	(France) 1905 Bordeaux	Men's horizontal bar
Silver	Joseph Castiglioni, Georges Charmoille, Joseph Lux, Jules Rolland, Louis Ségura, François Vidal	(Bohemia) 1907 Prague	Men's team
Silver	Jules Rolland	(Bohemia) 1907 Prague	Men's all-around
Silver	Jules Rolland	(Bohemia) 1907 Prague	Men's pommel horse
Gold	Joseph Lux	(Bohemia) 1907 Prague	Men's parallel bars
Bronze	Louis Ségura	(Bohemia) 1907 Prague	Men's parallel bars
Gold	Georges Charmoilles	(Bohemia) 1907 Prague	Men's horizontal bar
Bronze	Jules Rolland	(Bohemia) 1907 Prague	Men's horizontal bar
Gold	Joseph Castiglioni, Auguste Castille, Armand Coidelle, Joseph Martinez, Louis Ségura, Marcos Torrès	1909 Luxembourg	Men's team
Gold	Marco Torrès	1909 Luxembourg	Men's all-around
Bronze	Armand Coidelle	1909 Luxembourg	Men's all-around
Gold	Marco Torrès	1909 Luxembourg	Men's rings
Gold	Joseph Martinez	1909 Luxembourg	Men's parallel bars
Silver	Marco Torrès	1909 Luxembourg	Men's parallel bars
Silver	Auguste Castille	1909 Luxembourg	Men's parallel bars
Gold	Joseph Martinez	1909 Luxembourg	Men's horizontal bar
Silver	Antoine Costa, Marco Torrès, Jules Labéeu, M. Maucerier, Jules Lecoutre, Dominique Follacci	(Italy) 1911 Turin	Men's team
Silver	Antoine Costa	(Italy) 1911 Turin	Men's rings
Silver	Dominique Follacci	(Italy) 1911 Turin	Men's rings
Silver	Dominique Follacci	(Italy) 1911 Turin	Men's parallel bars
Bronze	Jules Labéeu	(Italy) 1911 Turin	Men's parallel bars
Bronze	Antoine Costa	(Italy) 1911 Turin	Men's parallel bars
Bronze	Jules Lecoutre	(Italy) 1911 Turin	Men's parallel bars
Silver	Marco Torrès	(Italy) 1911 Turin	Men's horizontal bar
Silver	N. Aubry, Ben Sadoun, Laurent Grech, Marquelet, Louis Ségura, Marco Torrès	(France) 1913 Paris	Men's team
Gold	Marco Torrès	(France) 1913 Paris	Men's all-around
Silver	Marco Torrès	(France) 1913 Paris	Men's pommel horse
Silver	N. Aubry	(France) 1913 Paris	Men's pommel horse
Gold	Laurent Grech	(France) 1913 Paris	Men's rings
Gold	Marco Torrès	(France) 1913 Paris	Men's rings
Gold	Marco Torrès	(France) 1913 Paris	Men's horizontal bar
Bronze	Jean Gounot, Louis Marty, Jacques Moser, Robert Morin, Alexandre Pannetier, Marco Torrès	(Socialist Federal Republic of Yugoslavia) 1922 Ljubljana	Men's team
Bronze	François Gangloff, Marcel Gorisse, Jean Gounot, Ernest Heeb, Alfred Krauss, Armand Solbach	(France) 1926 Lyon	Men's team
Silver	Louis Castelli, Jean Chanteur, Jean Gounot, Marcel Itten, Alfred Krauss, Georges Leroux, Maurice Rousseau, Amand Solbach	1930 Luxembourg	Men's team
Bronze	Alfred Krauss	1930 Luxembourg	Men's floor exercise
Silver	Alfred Krauss	1930 Luxembourg	Men's parallel bars
Bronze	Alphonse Anger, Raymond Badin, Marcel de Wolf, Raymond Dot, Lucien Masset, Michel Mathiot, Gilbert Pruvost, André Weingand	(Switzerland) 1950 Basel	Men's team
Silver	Ginette Durand, Colette Hué, Madeleine Jouffroy, Alexandra Lemoine, Liliane Montagne, Christine Palau, Irène Pittelioen, Jeanette Vogelbacher	(Switzerland) 1950 Basel	Women's team
Bronze	Raymond Dot	(Switzerland) 1950 Basel	Men's floor exercise
Bronze	Alexandra Lemoine	(Switzerland) 1950 Basel	Women's vault
Bronze	Raymond Dot	(Switzerland) 1950 Basel	Men's parallel bars
Silver	Philippe Vatuone	(Hungary) 1983 Budapest	Men's horizontal bar
Silver	Laurent Barbiéri	(Canada) 1985 Montreal	Men's vault
Silver	Éric Poujade	(Australia) 1994 Brisbane	Men's pommel horse
Bronze	Ludivine Furnon	(Japan) 1995 Sabae	Women's floor exercise
Bronze	Isabelle Severino	(Puerto Rico) 1996 San Juan	Women's uneven bars
Silver	Dimitri Karbanenko	(Switzerland) 1997 Lausanne	Men's floor exercise
Silver	Éric Poujade	(Switzerland) 1997 Lausanne	Men's pommel horse
Bronze	Yann Cucherat	(Australia) 2005 Melbourne	Men's parallel bars
Silver	Yann Cucherat	(Australia) 2005 Melbourne	Men's horizontal bar
Bronze	Cassy Vericel	(Germany) 2007 Stuttgart	Women's floor exercise
Bronze	Youna Dufournet	(United Kingdom) 2009 London	Women's vault
Gold	Thomas Bouhail	(Netherlands) 2010 Rotterdam	Men's vault
Silver	Cyril Tommasone	(Japan) 2011 Tokyo	Men's pommel horse
Bronze	Cyril Tommasone	(China) 2014 Nanning	Men's pommel horse
Bronze	Samir Aït Saïd	(Germany) 2019 Stuttgart	Men's rings
Bronze	Coline Devillard	(United Kingdom) 2022 Liverpool	Women's vault
Bronze	Marine Boyer, Lorette Charpy, Mélanie de Jesus dos Santos, Coline Devillard, Morgane Osyssek, Djenna Laroui	(Belgium) 2023 Antwerp	Women's team
Bronze	Maïana Prat	(Netherlands) 2026 Rotterdam	Women's floor exercise

== Medal tables ==
=== By gender ===
Gender	Gold	Silver	Bronze	Total
Men	25	29	20	74
Women	0	1	8	9

=== By event ===
Event	Gold	Silver	Bronze	Total
Men's horizontal bar	5	6	3	14
Men's parallel bars	5	4	7	16
Men's individual all-around	4	3	2	9
Men's rings	4	3	1	8
Men's pommel horse	3	7	2	12
Men's team	3	4	3	10
Men's vault	1	1	0	2
Men's floor exercise	0	1	2	3
Women's team	0	1	1	2
Women's floor exercise	0	0	3	3
Women's vault	0	0	3	3
Women's uneven bars	0	0	1	1
Women's balance beam	0	0	0	0
Women's individual all-around	0	0	0	0

== Junior World medalists ==
Medal	Name	Year	Event
Bronze	Ming van Eijken	(Turkey) 2023 Antalya	Girls' vault
Gold	Lola Chassat, Elena Colas, Maïana Prat, Perla Denéchère	(Philippines) 2025 Manila	Girls' team
Silver	Elena Colas	(Philippines) 2025 Manila	Girls' all-around
Silver	Leeroy Traore-Malatre	(Philippines) 2025 Manila	Boys' pommel horse
Silver	Elena Colas	(Philippines) 2025 Manila	Girls' floor exercise
Bronze	Maïana Prat	(Philippines) 2025 Manila	Girls' floor exercise

== See also ==
- France men's national artistic gymnastics team
- France women's national artistic gymnastics team
- List of Olympic female artistic gymnasts for France
