= World Artistic Gymnastics Championships – Men's horizontal bar =

The men's horizontal bar competition was an inaugural event at the World Artistic Gymnastics Championships. It has been held in every year since its inception.

Three medals are awarded: gold for first place, silver for second place, and bronze for third place. Tie breakers have not been used in every year. In the event of a tie between two gymnasts, both names are listed, and the following position (second for a tie for first, third for a tie for second) is left empty because a medal was not awarded for that position. If three gymnastics tied for a position, the following two positions are left empty.

== Medalists ==
Bold numbers in brackets denotes record number of victories.

| Year | Location | Gold | Silver | Bronze |
|---|---|---|---|---|
| 1903 | (Belgium) Antwerp | (France) Joseph Martinez | (France) Jules Lecoutre (France) Pierre Payssé (Belgium) Charles van Hulle | —N/a |
| 1905 | (France) Bordeaux | (France) Marcel Lalu | (France) Joseph Martinez | (France) Lucien Démanet (France) Pierre Payssé |
| 1907 | (Austria-Hungary) Prague | (France) Georges Charmoille (Bohemia) František Erben | —N/a | (France) Jules Rolland |
| 1909 | Luxembourg | (France) Joseph Martinez | (Bohemia) Josef Čada (Bohemia) František Erben (Austria-Hungary) K. Fuchs | —N/a |
| 1911 | (Italy) Turin | (Bohemia) Josef Čada | (France) Marco Torrès | (Italy) Guido Romano (Bohemia) Svatopluk Svoboda |
| 1913 | (France) Paris | (Bohemia) Josef Čada (France) Marco Torrès | —N/a | (Belgium) A. Demol (Italy) Osvaldo Palazzi (Bohemia) Josef Sykora |
| 1915–1917 | Not held due to World War I | | | |
| 1922 | (Kingdom of Yugoslavia) Ljubljana | (Czechoslovakia) Miroslav Klinger (Kingdom of Yugoslavia) Leon Štukelj (Kingdom of Yugoslavia) Peter Šumi | —N/a | —N/a |
| 1926 | (France) Lyon | (Kingdom of Yugoslavia) Leon Štukelj | (Kingdom of Yugoslavia) Josip Primožič | (Czechoslovakia) Ladislav Vácha |
| 1930 | Luxembourg | (Hungary) István Pelle | (Hungary) Miklós Péter | (Kingdom of Yugoslavia) Leon Štukelj |
| 1934 | (Hungary) Budapest | (Germany) Ernst Winter | (Switzerland) Georges Miez (Germany) Heinz Sandrock | —N/a |
| 1938 | (Czechoslovakia) Prague | (Switzerland) Michael Reusch | (Czechoslovakia) Alois Hudec | (Switzerland) Walter Beck |
| 1942 | Not held due to World War II | | | |
| 1950 | (Switzerland) Basel | (Finland) Paavo Aaltonen | (Finland) Veikko Huhtanen | (Switzerland) Walter Lehmann (Switzerland) Josef Stalder |
| 1954 | (Italy) Rome | (Soviet Union) Valentin Muratov | (West Germany) Helmut Bantz (Soviet Union) Boris Shakhlin | —N/a |
| 1958 | (Soviet Union) Moscow | (Soviet Union) Boris Shakhlin | (Soviet Union) Albert Azaryan | (Japan) Masao Takemoto (Soviet Union) Yuri Titov |
| 1962 | (Czechoslovakia) Prague | (Japan) Takashi Ono | (Japan) Yukio Endō (Soviet Union) Pavel Stolbov | —N/a |
| 1966 | (West Germany) Dortmund | (Japan) Akinori Nakayama | (Japan) Yukio Endō | (Japan) Takashi Mitsukuri |
| 1970 | (Socialist Federal Republic of Yugoslavia) Ljubljana | (Japan) Eizō Kenmotsu | (Japan) Akinori Nakayama | (Japan) Takuji Hayata (East Germany) Klaus Köste |
| 1974 | (Bulgaria) Varna | (West Germany) Eberhard Gienger | (East Germany) Wolfgang Thüne | (Japan) Eizō Kenmotsu (Poland) Andrzej Szajna |
| 1978 | (France) Strasbourg | (Japan) Shigeru Kasamatsu | (West Germany) Eberhard Gienger | (Bulgaria) Stoyan Deltchev (Soviet Union) Gennady Krysin |
| 1979 | (United States) Fort Worth | (United States) Kurt Thomas | (Soviet Union) Aleksandr Tkachyov | (Soviet Union) Alexander Dityatin |
| 1981 | (Soviet Union) Moscow | (Soviet Union) Aleksandr Tkachyov | (Soviet Union) Artur Akopyan (West Germany) Eberhard Gienger | —N/a |
| 1983 | (Hungary) Budapest | (Soviet Union) Dmitry Bilozerchev | (Soviet Union) Alexander Pogorelov (France) Philippe Vatuone | —N/a |
| 1985 | (Canada) Montreal | (China) Tong Fei | (East Germany) Sylvio Kroll | (Japan) Mitsuaki Watanabe |
| 1987 | (Netherlands) Rotterdam | (Soviet Union) Dmitry Bilozerchev | (Canada) Curtis Hibbert | (East Germany) Holger Behrendt (Hungary) Zsolt Borkai |
| 1989 | (West Germany) Stuttgart | (China) Li Chunyang | (Soviet Union) Vladimir Artemov | (Japan) Yukio Iketani |
| 1991 | (United States) Indianapolis | (Germany) Ralf Büchner (China) Li Chunyang | —N/a | (Soviet Union) Vitaly Scherbo |
| 1992 | (France) Paris | (Commonwealth of Independent States) Hrihoriy Misyutin | (China) Li Jing | (Commonwealth of Independent States) Ihor Korobchynskyi |
| 1993 | (United Kingdom) Birmingham | (Russia) Sergey Kharkov | (Romania) Marius Gherman | (Hungary) Zoltán Supola |
| 1994 | (Australia) Brisbane | (Belarus) Vitaly Scherbo | (Hungary) Zoltán Supola | (Belarus) Ivan Ivankov |
| 1995 | (Japan) Sabae | (Germany) Andreas Wecker | (Japan) Yoshiaki Hatakeda | (Bulgaria) Krasimir Dunev (China) Zhang Jinjing |
| 1996 | (Puerto Rico) San Juan | (Spain) Jesús Carballo | (Bulgaria) Krasimir Dunev | (Belarus) Vitaly Scherbo |
| 1997 | (Switzerland) Lausanne | (Finland) Jani Tanskanen | (Spain) Jesús Carballo | (Ukraine) Oleksandr Beresch |
| 1999 | (China) Tianjin | (Spain) Jesús Carballo | (Canada) Alexander Jeltkov | (China) Yang Wei |
| 2001 | (Belgium) Ghent | (Greece) Vlasios Maras | (Ukraine) Oleksandr Beresch (Australia) Philippe Rizzo | —N/a |
| 2002 | (Hungary) Debrecen | (Greece) Vlasios Maras | (Belarus) Ivan Ivankov (Slovenia) Aljaž Pegan | —N/a |
| 2003 | (United States) Anaheim | (Japan) Takehiro Kashima | (Italy) Igor Cassina | (Russia) Alexei Nemov |
| 2005 | (Australia) Melbourne | (Slovenia) Aljaž Pegan | (France) Yann Cucherat | (Ukraine) Valeriy Honcharov |
| 2006 | (Denmark) Aarhus | (Australia) Philippe Rizzo | (Slovenia) Aljaž Pegan | (Greece) Vlasios Maras |
| 2007 | (Germany) Stuttgart | (Germany) Fabian Hambüchen | (Slovenia) Aljaž Pegan | (Japan) Hisashi Mizutori |
| 2009 | (United Kingdom) London | (China) Zou Kai | (Netherlands) Epke Zonderland | (Italy) Igor Cassina |
| 2010 | (Netherlands) Rotterdam | (China) Zhang Chenglong | (Netherlands) Epke Zonderland | (Germany) Fabian Hambüchen |
| 2011 | (Japan) Tokyo | (China) Zou Kai | (China) Zhang Chenglong | (Japan) Kōhei Uchimura |
| 2013 | (Belgium) Antwerp | (Netherlands) Epke Zonderland | (Germany) Fabian Hambüchen | (Japan) Kōhei Uchimura |
| 2014 | (China) Nanning | (Netherlands) Epke Zonderland | (Japan) Kōhei Uchimura | (Croatia) Marijo Možnik |
| 2015 | (United Kingdom) Glasgow | (Japan) Kōhei Uchimura | (United States) Danell Leyva | (Cuba) Manrique Larduet |
| 2017 | (Canada) Montreal | (Croatia) Tin Srbić | (Netherlands) Epke Zonderland | (Netherlands) Bart Deurloo |
| 2018 | (Qatar) Doha | (Netherlands) Epke Zonderland (3) | (Japan) Kōhei Uchimura | (United States) Sam Mikulak |
| 2019 | (Germany) Stuttgart | (Brazil) Arthur Mariano | (Croatia) Tin Srbić | (Russia) Artur Dalaloyan |
| 2021 | (Japan) Kitakyushu | (China) Hu Xuwei | (Japan) Daiki Hashimoto | (United States) Brody Malone |
| 2022 | (United Kingdom) Liverpool | (United States) Brody Malone | (Japan) Daiki Hashimoto | (Brazil) Arthur Mariano |
| 2023 | (Belgium) Antwerp | (Japan) Daiki Hashimoto | (Croatia) Tin Srbić | (China) Su Weide |
| 2025 | (Indonesia) Jakarta | (United States) Brody Malone | (Japan) Daiki Hashimoto | (United Kingdom) Joe Fraser |
| 2026 | (Netherlands) Rotterdam | (Chinese Taipei) Tang Chia-hung | (Japan) Shinnosuke Oka | (Russia) Sergei Naidin ^{[d]} |

== All-time medal count ==
Last updated after the 2026 World Championships.

| Rank | Nation | Gold | Silver | Bronze | Total |
|---|---|---|---|---|---|
| 1 | Japan | 7 | 10 | 9 | 26 |
| 2 | China | 7 | 2 | 3 | 12 |
| 3 | Soviet Union | 5 | 7 | 4 | 16 |
| 4 | France | 5 | 6 | 3 | 14 |
| 5 | Germany | 4 | 2 | 1 | 7 |
| 6 | Netherlands | 3 | 3 | 1 | 7 |
| 7 | Bohemia ^{[a]} | 3 | 2 | 2 | 7 |
| 8 | United States | 3 | 1 | 2 | 6 |
| 9 | Yugoslavia | 3 | 1 | 1 | 5 |
| 10 | Finland | 2 | 1 | 0 | 3 |
| 10 | Spain | 2 | 1 | 0 | 3 |
| 12 | Greece | 2 | 0 | 1 | 3 |
| 13 | Slovenia | 1 | 3 | 0 | 4 |
| 13 | West Germany | 1 | 3 | 0 | 4 |
| 15 | Hungary | 1 | 2 | 2 | 5 |
| 16 | Croatia | 1 | 2 | 1 | 4 |
| 17 | Switzerland | 1 | 1 | 3 | 5 |
| 18 | Belarus | 1 | 1 | 2 | 4 |
| 19 | Czechoslovakia | 1 | 1 | 1 | 3 |
| 20 | Australia | 1 | 1 | 0 | 2 |
| 21 | Russia ^{[d]} | 1 | 0 | 3 | 4 |
| 22 | Brazil | 1 | 0 | 1 | 2 |
| 22 | CIS ^{[c]} | 1 | 0 | 1 | 2 |
| 24 | Chinese Taipei | 1 | 0 | 0 | 1 |
| 25 | East Germany | 0 | 2 | 2 | 4 |
| 26 | Canada | 0 | 2 | 0 | 2 |
| 27 | Italy | 0 | 1 | 3 | 4 |
| 28 | Bulgaria | 0 | 1 | 2 | 3 |
| 28 | Ukraine | 0 | 1 | 2 | 3 |
| 30 | Belgium | 0 | 1 | 1 | 2 |
| 31 | Austria-Hungary ^{[b]} | 0 | 1 | 0 | 1 |
| 31 | Romania | 0 | 1 | 0 | 1 |
| 33 | Cuba | 0 | 0 | 1 | 1 |
| 33 | Great Britain | 0 | 0 | 1 | 1 |
| 33 | Poland | 0 | 0 | 1 | 1 |
| Totals (35 entries) | | 58 | 60 | 54 | 172 |

Notes

- ^[a] Official FIG documents credit medals earned by athletes from Bohemia as medals for Czechoslovakia.
- ^[b] Official FIG documents credit medals earned by athletes from Austria-Hungary as medals for Yugoslavia.
- ^[c] Official FIG documents credit medals earned by athletes from former Soviet Union at the 1992 World Artistic Gymnastics Championships in Paris, France, as medals for CIS (Commonwealth of Independent States).
- ^[d] At the 2026 World Artistic Gymnastics Championships in Rotterdam, the Netherlands, Russia competed under the name "World Gymnastics 2" (WG2) due to regulations by the Dutch authorities. World Gymnastics still credit medals earned by Russian athletes at these championships as medals for Russia.

== Multiple medalists ==
| Rank | Gymnast | Nation | Years | Gold | Silver | Bronze | Total |
|---|---|---|---|---|---|---|---|
| 1 | Epke Zonderland | Netherlands | 2009–2018 | 3 | 3 | 0 | 6 |
| 2 | Josef Čada | Bohemia | 1909–1913 | 2 | 1 | 0 | 3 |
| 2 | Jesús Carballo | Spain | 1996–1999 | 2 | 1 | 0 | 3 |
| 2 | Joseph Martinez | France | 1903–1909 | 2 | 1 | 0 | 3 |
| 5 | Brody Malone | United States | 2021–2025 | 2 | 0 | 1 | 3 |
| 5 | Vlasios Maras | Greece | 2001–2006 | 2 | 0 | 1 | 3 |
| 5 | Leon Štukelj | Yugoslavia | 1922–1930 | 2 | 0 | 1 | 3 |
| 8 | Dmitry Bilozerchev | Soviet Union | 1983–1987 | 2 | 0 | 0 | 2 |
| 8 | Li Chunyang | China | 1989–1991 | 2 | 0 | 0 | 2 |
| 8 | Zou Kai | China | 2009–2011 | 2 | 0 | 0 | 2 |
| 11 | Daiki Hashimoto | Japan | 2021–2025 | 1 | 3 | 0 | 4 |
| 11 | Aljaž Pegan | Slovenia | 2002–2007 | 1 | 3 | 0 | 4 |
| 13 | Kōhei Uchimura | Japan | 2011–2018 | 1 | 2 | 2 | 5 |
| 14 | Eberhard Gienger | West Germany | 1974–1981 | 1 | 2 | 0 | 3 |
| 14 | Tin Srbić | Croatia | 2017–2023 | 1 | 2 | 0 | 3 |
| 16 | Fabian Hambüchen | Germany | 2007–2013 | 1 | 1 | 1 | 3 |
| 17 | František Erben | Bohemia | 1907–1909 | 1 | 1 | 0 | 2 |
| 17 | Akinori Nakayama | Japan | 1966–1970 | 1 | 1 | 0 | 2 |
| 17 | Philippe Rizzo | Australia | 2001–2006 | 1 | 1 | 0 | 2 |
| 17 | Boris Shakhlin | Soviet Union | 1954–1958 | 1 | 1 | 0 | 2 |
| 17 | Aleksandr Tkachyov | Soviet Union | 1979–1981 | 1 | 1 | 0 | 2 |
| 17 | Marco Torrès | France | 1911–1913 | 1 | 1 | 0 | 2 |
| 17 | Zhang Chenglong | China | 2010–2011 | 1 | 1 | 0 | 2 |
| 24 | Vitaly Scherbo | Soviet Union; Belarus | 1991–1996 | 1 | 0 | 2 | 3 |
| 25 | Eizō Kenmotsu | Japan | 1970–1974 | 1 | 0 | 1 | 2 |
| 25 | Arthur Mariano | Brazil | 2019–2022 | 1 | 0 | 1 | 2 |
| 27 | Yukio Endō | Japan | 1962–1966 | 0 | 2 | 0 | 2 |
| 28 | Oleksandr Beresch | Ukraine | 1997–2001 | 0 | 1 | 1 | 2 |
| 28 | Igor Cassina | Italy | 2003–2009 | 0 | 1 | 1 | 2 |
| 28 | Krasimir Dunev | Bulgaria | 1995–1996 | 0 | 1 | 1 | 2 |
| 28 | Ivan Ivankov | Belarus | 1994–2002 | 0 | 1 | 1 | 2 |
| 28 | Pierre Payssé | France | 1903–1905 | 0 | 1 | 1 | 2 |
| 28 | Zoltán Supola | Hungary | 1993–1994 | 0 | 1 | 1 | 2 |
