= Georges Dejaeghère =

French gymnast

- Full name: Georges Auguste Dejaeghère
- Born: 7 January 1879 Roubaix, France
- Died: 21 May 1955 (aged 76) Mouscron, France

Gymnastics career
- Discipline: Men's artistic gymnastics
- Country represented: France; (1900-1905)
- Club: Jeunesse du Blanc-Seau, Tourcoing
Medal record
Representing France
World Championships
Gold medal – first place	1903 Antwerp	Team
Gold medal – first place	1903 Antwerp	Pommel Horse
Gold medal – first place	1905 Bordeaux	Team
Gold medal – first place	1905 Bordeaux	Pommel Horse

Georges Auguste Dejaeghère (7 January 1879 - 21 May 1955) was a French gymnast. He was a member of Jeunesse du Blanc-Seau in Tourcoing and represented France at international tournaments. He became (retrospectively) a four-time World Champion at the two earliest World Artistic Gymnastics Championships. At the national level, he won many competitions, most notably the 1904 France national championship.

== Gymnastics career ==
=== Style ===
Georges Dejaeghère has been characterized as being a graceful and impeccable gymnast on multiple occasions during the first half of the 1900s. It has also been said that his gymnastics performances are "brilliant" with "craftsmanship".

=== National-level achievements ===
During the early 1900s, he won a variety of national-level competitions in France. In May 1901, he was crowned champion of the "Concours de Bologna-sur-Mer", after winning the excellence division. In August 1901 he won the gymnastics competition in Armentières ahead of Émile Fréteur and Charles Simon. In June 1902 he became champion at a main competition in Lens where 800 gymnasts took part. At the 1903 National Championships in Marseille he finished second with 173 points behind Joseph Martinez.

His biggest achievement at national level was at the 1904 French Gymnastics Championships in May 1904 in Arras, where he won the Carnot prize and became national champion. He scored during this championship the maximal score in the last compulsory high bar event. He won the championships with a two points lead over the number two. It was at the time a notable title, and some three decades later he was still identified as national champion when referred to in newspaper articles.

=== International achievements ===
Dejaeghère (Note: Name as Nicolas Dejaeghère has been indicated by some sources, but this is not correct per contemporary sources.) competed at the 1900 Summer Olympics, where the gymnastics program only had one event, the individual all-around event, and he finished 11th.

Dejaeghère also took part in early-era international tournaments. Several decades later, in 1931, these international tournaments are retrospectively regarded as official World Gymnastics Championships. The winners of the events and also the people who set the highest score in the individual events are recognized as world champions.

The first gymnastics World Championships took place in 1903 in Antwerp; he became (retrospectively) a two-time world champion. Dejaeghère set the highest score in the pommel horse discipline together with his compatriot Joseph Lux and Hendricus Thijsen of the Netherlands. With the French national team, he won the team event. Overall, he finished individually in fourth place.

The next world championships were the 1905 World Championships in Bordeaux. Also, here he became world champion again in the pommel horse event and in the team event together with Lucien Démanet, Marcel Lalu, Daniel Lavielle, Joseph Martinez and Pierre Payssé. Like at the 1903 championships, he finished individually in fourth place.

=== Other gymnastics activities ===
Already during his sporting career he the assistant secretary of Jeunesse du Blanc-Seau in 1903.

After his active gymnastics career, he became a physical educator and earned the Medaille d'education physique in 1936. He was a gymnastics trainer (in French, moniteur) with Jeunesse du Blanc-Seau and was involved in the organisation of the 1927 national competitions. He was vice-president of the committee in 1932. In 1933 he was one of the two jury members at gymnastics competitions together with former world champion Gustave Sandras.

== Personal life ==
Georges Dejaeghère was born in Roubaix on 7 January 1879. During his adulthood he lived just south of Tourcoing in Wasquehal on rue Carpeax. He worked at Vanoutryve textile establishments from 1892. After receiving the silver Médaille d'honneur du travail in 1922 for over 30 years of service, he received in 1943 from the Secretary of State for Labor the silver-gilt Médaille d'honneur du travail for over 50 years of service.

He died north of Tourcoing in Mouscron on 21 May 1954 at the age of 76.

== Awards ==
- 1922: - Médaille d'honneur du travail (silver)
- 1936: - Medaille d'education physique (silver)
- 1943: - Médaille d'honneur du travail (vermeil)
