= Gymnastics at the 1900 Summer Olympics =

Gymnastics at the Games of the II Olympiad
- Gymnastics pictogram
- Venue: Vélodrome de Vincennes
- Dates: 29–30 July 1900
- No. of events: 1 (1 men, 0 women)
- Competitors: 135 from 8 nations

Men's artistic individual all-around at the Games of the II Olympiad
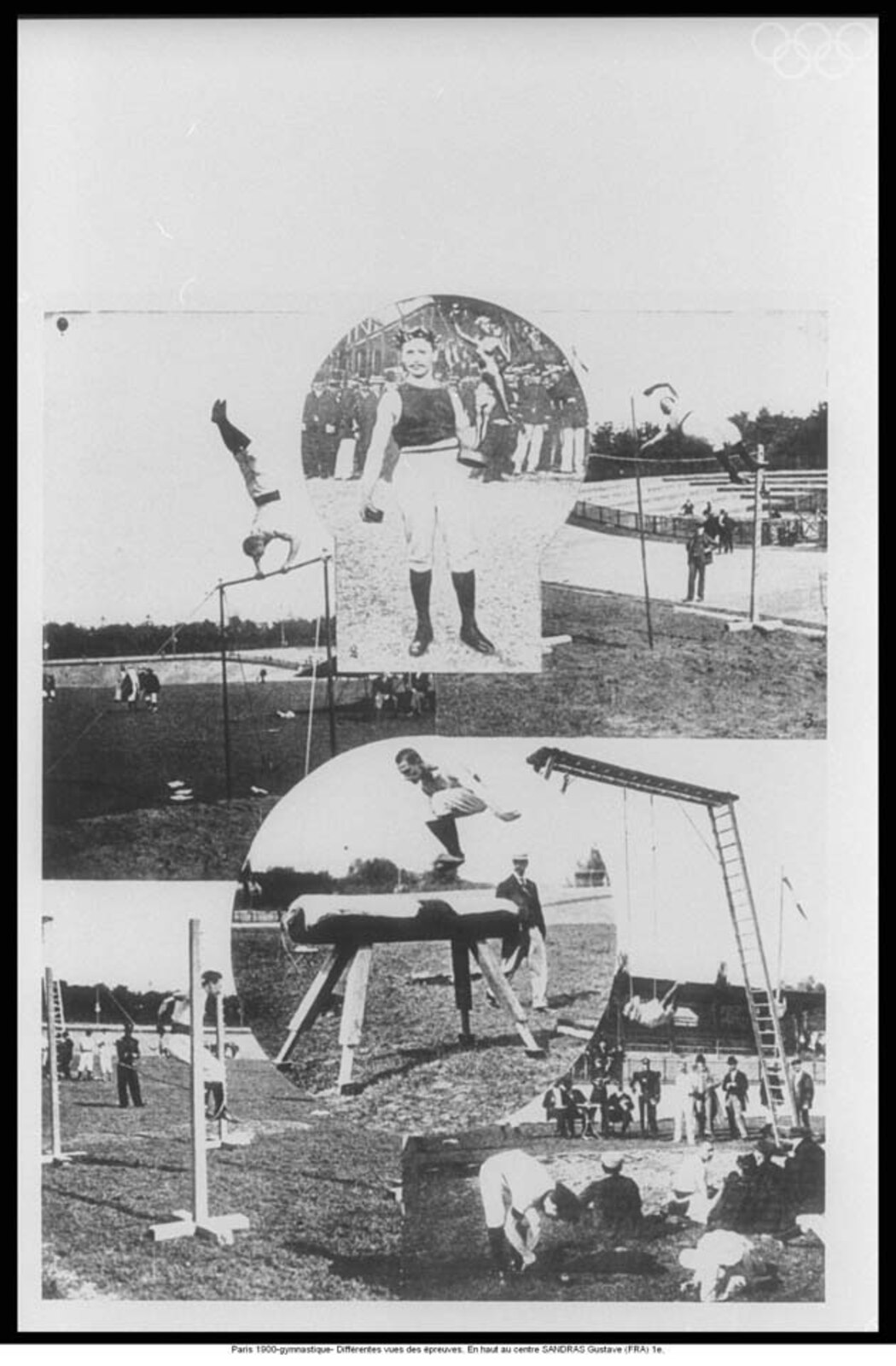
- Gymnastics competitions at the 1900 Summer Olympics. Gold medalist Gustave Sandras is depicted at top center.
- Venue: Vélodrome de Vincennes
- Dates: 29–30 July 1900
- Competitors: 135 from 8 nations
- Winning score: 302

Medalists
| 1st place, gold medalist(s) | | Gustave Sandras; France |
| 2nd place, silver medalist(s) | | Noël Bas; France |
| 3rd place, bronze medalist(s) | | Lucien Démanet; France |

At the 1900 Summer Olympics one gymnastics event for men was contested. The competition was held on Sunday, 29 July 1900, and on Monday, 30 July 1900. There were 135 competitors from 8 nations. The top 18 places were taken by French gymnasts, of which there were more than 100. The event was won by Gustave Sandras, with Noël Bas finishing second and Lucien Démanet third. The highest-placing foreign gymnast was Jules Ducret of Switzerland, in a tie for 19th place.

== Medal summary ==
| Games | Gold | Silver | Bronze |
|---|---|---|---|
| All around | Gustave Sandras; France | Noël Bas; France | Lucien Démanet; France |

== Background ==
This was the first appearance of an all-around event. There had been various apparatus events at the 1896 Games, but no overall competition. In contrast, the 1900 Games saw only the all-around event without medals or separate events for any individual apparatus. At the time, athletics events were often combined with gymnastics events in combined events such as this one.

The Swiss championships were scheduled for a week after this competition, resulting in few Swiss gymnasts competing here.

== Competition format ==
Gymnasts performed in 16 exercises, many of them being two competitions of the same discipline with one compulsory exercise and one voluntary exercise. There was a maximum of 20 points in each exercise, leading to a total maximum of 320 points. The events were mostly gymnastic in nature, but also included a number of athletics events and a weightlifting competition.

- 1. and 2. - Horizontal bar (compulsory and optional exercises)
- 3. and 4. - Parallel bars (compulsory and optional exercises)
- 5. and 6. - Rings (compulsory and optional exercises)
- 7. and 8. - Pommel horse (compulsory and optional exercises)
- 9. and 10. - Floor exercise (compulsory and optional exercises)
- 11. - Horse vault (compulsory exercise)
- 12. - Combined high jump
- 13. - Long jump
- 14. - Pole vault
- 15. - Rope climbing
- 16. - Weightlifting

The combined high jump required a jump over a rope that was 1.25 metres above the ground and 1 metre away from the take-off. The scoring standard for the long jump was 5 metres; for the pole vault, 2.2 metres. The rope climbing featured a rope of 6 metres. The weightlifting used a 50 kilograms weight, with 2 points for each overhead lift up to 10 lifts.

== Schedule ==
| Date | Time | Round |
|---|---|---|
| Sunday, 29 July 1900 | | Final |
| Monday, 30 July 1900 | | Final, continued |

== Results ==
| Rank | Gymnast | Nation | Score |
|---|---|---|---|
| 1st place, gold medalist(s) | Gustave Sandras | France | 302 |
| 2nd place, silver medalist(s) | Noël Bas | France | 295 |
| 3rd place, bronze medalist(s) | Lucien Démanet | France | 293 |
| 4 | Pierre Payssé | France | 290 |
| 4 | Jules Rolland | France | 290 |
| 6 | Gustave Fahy | France | 283 |
| 7 | Joseph Martinez | France | 277 |
| 8 | Marcel Lalu | France | 275 |
| 8 | Georges Mauvezain | France | 275 |
| 10 | L. Léstienne | France | 273 |
| 11 | Georges Dejaeghère | France | 272 |
| 12 | Gaché | France | 270 |
| 12 | Joseph Lavielle | France | 270 |
| 14 | Jean Berhouzouq | France | 268 |
| 15 | Bollet | France | 267 |
| 15 | Joseph Castiglioni | France | 267 |
| 17 | Gaucher | France | 266 |
| 18 | Moreno | France | 265 |
| 19 | Jules Ducret | Switzerland | 264 |
| 19 | Obrecht | France | 264 |
| 21 | Daniel Lavielle | France | 263 |
| 22 | Monteil | France | 262 |
| 23 | Félix Ghysels | France | 261 |
| 23 | Oscar Jeanfavre | Switzerland | 261 |
| 23 | Schaan | France | 261 |
| 26 | Allègré | France | 257 |
| 27 | Fernand Ravoux | France | 256 |
| 28 | Camillo Pavanello | Italy | 255 |
| 29 | Hugo Peitsch | Germany | 252 |
| 30 | Paulin Lemaire | France | 251 |
| 31 | William Connor | Great Britain | 250 |
| 32 | Bettremieux | France | 249 |
| 32 | František Erben | Bohemia | 249 |
| 32 | Dominique Ravoux | France | 249 |
| 35 | Auguste Castille | France | 248 |
| 35 | Jules Perret | France | 248 |
| 37 | Paul Gibiard | France | 247 |
| 37 | Jules Lecoutre | France | 247 |
| 37 | Vedeux | France | 247 |
| 40 | Balossier | France | 246 |
| 40 | Imbert | France | 246 |
| 40 | Pratviel | France | 246 |
| 43 | Élie Bourgois | France | 245 |
| 43 | Charles Broadbeck | Switzerland | 245 |
| 43 | Honorez | France | 245 |
| 46 | Bouchon | France | 244 |
| 47 | Bornes | France | 243 |
| 47 | Émile Fréteur | France | 243 |
| 49 | Michaud | France | 242 |
| 50 | Jardinier | France | 241 |
| 50 | Labonal | France | 241 |
| 50 | Thiriet | France | 241 |
| 53 | Eugen Fürstenberger | Germany | 240 |
| 54 | Richard Genserowski | Germany | 238 |
| 54 | Pearce | Great Britain | 238 |
| 56 | Fernhbach | France | 236 |
| 56 | Émile Scherb | France | 236 |
| 56 | Strasser | France | 236 |
| 59 | Emil Rotong | Germany | 234 |
| 60 | Grimm | France | 233 |
| 60 | Simon | France | 233 |
| 62 | Boulanger | France | 232 |
| 62 | Lévy | France | 232 |
| 64 | Deroubaix | France | 231 |
| 65 | Blanchard | France | 230 |
| 65 | Jean-Marie le Bourvelec | France | 230 |
| 67 | Julese Deleval | France | 229 |
| 67 | Salzard | France | 229 |
| 69 | Fierens | France | 228 |
| 70 | Georges Dubois | France | 225 |
| 71 | Carl Wiegand | Germany | 224 |
| 72 | Fritz Manteuffel | Germany | 223 |
| 73 | William Lloyd Phillips | Great Britain | 222 |
| 74 | Dejean | France | 221 |
| 75 | Bourgougnoux | France | 220 |
| 75 | Henri Fréteur | France | 220 |
| 77 | Franz Abbé | Germany | 219 |
| 77 | Otto Meyer | France | 219 |
| 79 | Fritz Danner | Germany | 216 |
| 79 | Douchet | France | 216 |
| 79 | Erwin Kurtz | Germany | 216 |
| 79 | Pradairol | France | 216 |
| 79 | Viart | France | 216 |
| 84 | Debailly | France | 214 |
| 84 | Joseph Decroze | France | 214 |
| 84 | Rostin | France | 214 |
| 84 | Fritz Sauer | Germany | 214 |
| 88 | Aubert | France | 211 |
| 88 | Dufeite | France | 211 |
| 88 | Gillet | France | 211 |
| 88 | Gyula Kakas | Hungary | 211 |
| 88 | Labouret | France | 211 |
| 93 | Bourry | France | 210 |
| 93 | Koubi | France | 210 |
| 93 | Pelat | France | 210 |
| 93 | Viéville | France | 210 |
| 97 | Ollivier | France | 209 |
| 98 | Chapau | France | 208 |
| 99 | De Poorten | Belgium | 207 |
| 100 | Minot | France | 206 |
| 101 | Coone | France | 205 |
| 102 | Denis | France | 204 |
| 102 | Gustav Flatow | Germany | 204 |
| 102 | Jules Pinaud | France | 204 |
| 105 | Albert Barodet | France | 201 |
| 106 | Sidrac | France | 200 |
| 107 | Julius Nuninger | Germany | 199 |
| 108 | Sourzat | France | 196 |
| 109 | Buchert | France | 195 |
| 109 | Lacombe | France | 195 |
| 111 | Van Hule | France | 194 |
| 112 | Michelet | Belgium | 192 |
| 113 | Favier | France | 190 |
| 113 | Fouché | France | 190 |
| 115 | Lemoine | France | 187 |
| 116 | Charles Deckert | France | 184 |
| 117 | Germain | France | 183 |
| 118 | Jacquemin | France | 180 |
| 118 | Adolf Tannert | Germany | 180 |
| 120 | Daniel Kehr | France | 178 |
| 121 | Coucou | France | 177 |
| 122 | Cousin | France | 175 |
| 122 | Leroux | France | 175 |
| 124 | Henry Hiatt | Great Britain | 172 |
| 125 | Vandenhaute | France | 166 |
| 126 | Bernillon | France | 164 |
| 126 | Delaleau | France | 164 |
| 126 | Parisot | France | 164 |
| 126 | Samuel Roche | France | 164 |
| 130 | Touche | France | 154 |
| 131 | Prilleux | France | 149 |
| 132 | Bayer | France | 145 |
| 133 | Terrier | France | 133 |
| — | Gyula Katona | Hungary | DNF |
| — | Oscar Naumann | Germany | DNF |

== Participating nations ==
A total of 135 gymnasts from 8 nations competed at the Paris Games:

- Belgium (2)
- Bohemia (1)
- France (108)
- Germany (14)
- Great Britain (4)
- Hungary (2)
- Italy (1)
- Switzerland (3)

== Medal table ==
| Rank | Nation | Gold | Silver | Bronze | Total |
|---|---|---|---|---|---|
| 1 | France | 1 | 1 | 1 | 3 |
| Totals (1 entries) | | 1 | 1 | 1 | 3 |
