= Dejagere =

Dejagere, Dejaegere or Dejaeghere is a Belgian surname. Notable people with the surname include:

- Brecht Dejaegere (born 1991), Belgian footballer
- Georges Dejagere (1879–1955), French gymnast
- Veerle Dejaeghere (born 1973), Belgian runner
