= Oscar Jeanfavre =

Swiss gymnast

- Died: June 1939

Gymnastics career
- Discipline: Men's artistic gymnastics
- Country represented: Switzerland
- Gym: Locle

Oscar Jeanfavre (died June 1939) was a Swiss gymnast.

== Olympics career ==
He competed in the men's individual all-around event at the 1900 Summer Olympics.
