= Hendricus Thijsen =

Dutch gymnast (1881–1946)

- Full name: Hendricus Josephus Franciscus Thijsen
- Born: 30 July 1881 Amsterdam, Netherlands
- Died: 10 October 1946 (aged 65) Johannesburg, Union of South Africa (Note: The death place is not entirely clear. Pretoria is according to a note by Olympedia also a possibility to be the location.)
- Height: 170 cm (5 ft 7 in)

Gymnastics career
- Discipline: Men's artistic gymnastics
- Country represented: Netherlands
- Club: Olympia
Medal record
Representing Netherlands
World Championships
Gold medal – first place	1903 Antwerp	Pommel Horse

Hendricus Josephus Franciscus Thijsen also written as Henricus Thijsen (30 July 1881 – 10 October 1946) was a Dutch gymnast. He was a member of Olympia in Amsterdam and represented the Netherlands at international competitions.

Thijsen is the first Dutch World Gymnastics Champion setting the highest score at the first World Artistic Gymnastics Championships in the pommel horse discipline in 1903. He was the only individual Dutch male world champion for over 100 years.

== Early life ==
Thijsen was born in Amsterdam on 30 July 1881. He was a member of the gymnastics club Olympia in the same city. One of his earliest newspapers mentions was in May 1901 mentioned as one of the main gymnasts of the club.

== Gymnastics career ==
At the 1902 annual individual tournament in Amsterdam, Thijsen finished second behind Schmidt and was one of the five gymnasts who earned a diploma. The following year he represented the Netherlands at the first-ever World Artistic Gymnastics Championships in 1903 in Antwerp. He had the highest score in the pommel horse discipline, tied with Frenchmen Georges Dejaeghère and Joseph Lux. At the time, it was not named as a world championships and no individual titles were awarded. However, the results were praised in Dutch newspapers with De Telegraaf writing “No wonder that wherever the Dutch gymnasts appear, they are celebrated as the heroes of the day!”.

A few decades later, in 1931, the former tournament including the Antwerp 1903 tournament, became retrospective an official world championships ànd Thijsen became recognized as individual world champion. He was the only male Dutch individual world champion for over 100 years. His successor was Yuri van Gelder winning the rings event at the 2005 championships.

At the 1903 annual individual tournament in Amsterdam he finished again second, this time behind Waag and received another a diploma.

Thijsen also competed at other international tournaments, including the 1908 Summer Olympics in London, where he competed in the team all-around event and in the individual all-around event.

In 1925 he emigrated to South Africa. He died there in Johannesburg (or Pretoria) on 10 October 1946 at the age of 65 years old.
