= Camillo Pavanello =

Italian gymnast

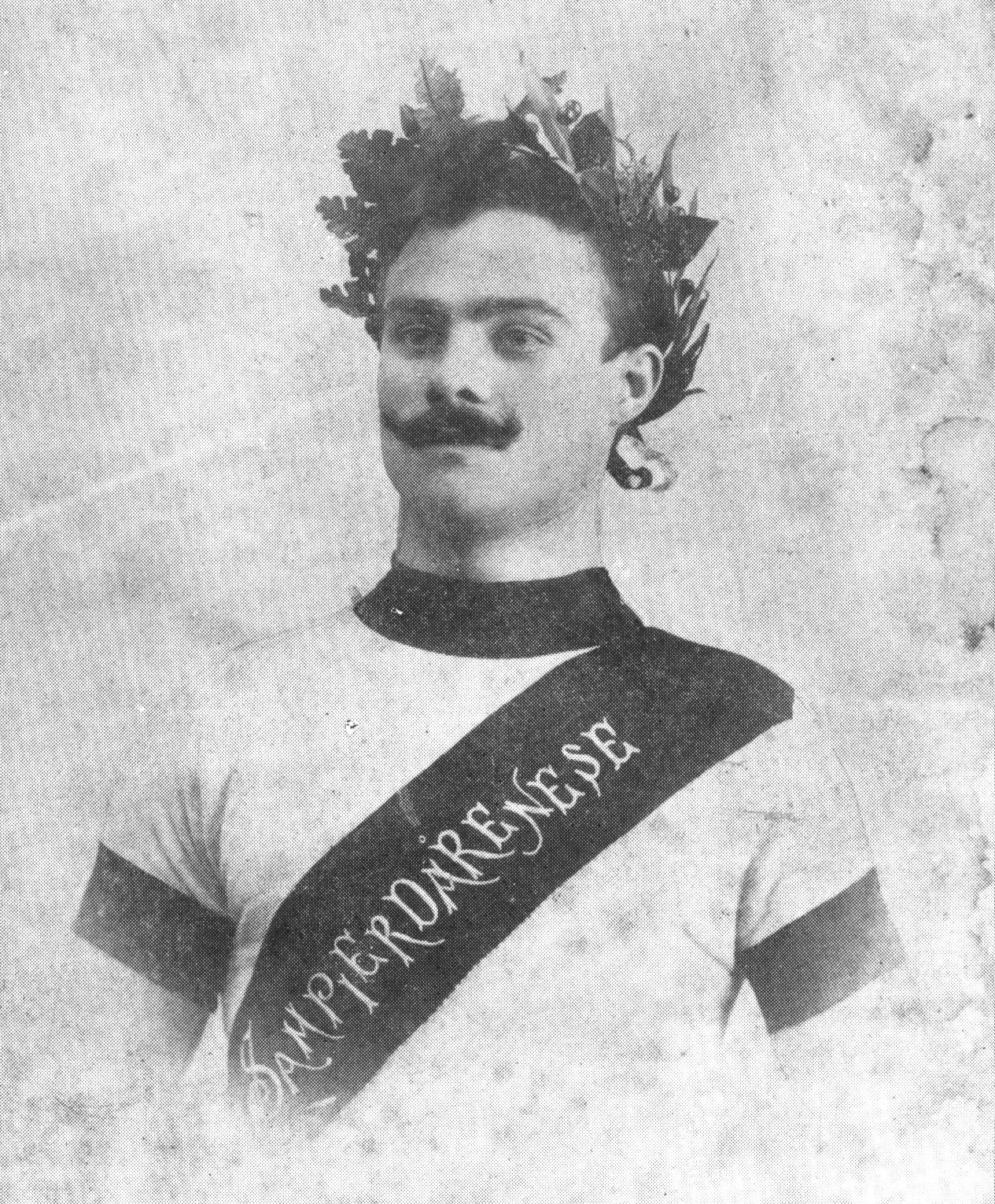

Personal information
- Born: 20 October 1879 Terni, Kingdom of Italy
- Died: 7 July 1951 (aged 71) Genoa, Italy

Gymnastics career
- Discipline: Men's artistic gymnastics
- Country represented: Italy
- Club: Società Ginnastica Comunale Sampierdarenese

Camillo Pavanello (20 October 1879 – 7 July 1951) was an Italian gymnast. He competed in the men's individual all-around event at the 1900 Summer Olympics.
