= William Lloyd Phillips =

Welsh gymnast (1881–1966)

- Born: 8 September 1881 Newport, Wales
- Died: 22 April 1966 (aged 84) St. Petersburg, Florida, US

Gymnastics career
- Discipline: Men's artistic gymnastics
- Country represented: (United Kingdom) Great Britain

William Lloyd Phillips (8 September 1881 – 22 April 1966) was a Welsh gymnast. He competed in the men's team all-around event at the 1900 Summer Olympics. He was the first Welshman to compete at the Olympics; until July 2021, only his surname was known.
