= Richard Genserowski =

German gymnast

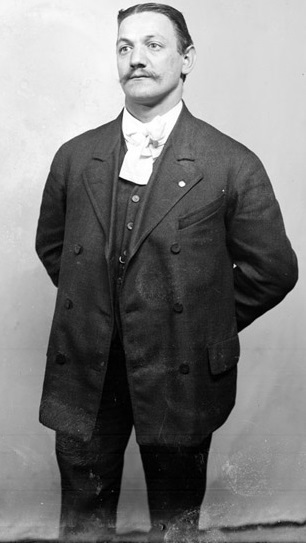
- Genserowski c. 1907

Personal information
- Full name: David Richard Genserowski
- Born: 4 July 1875 Berlin, German Empire
- Died: 31 December 1955 (aged 80) Portland, Oregon, US
- Height: 163 cm (5 ft 4 in)

Gymnastics career
- Discipline: Men's artistic gymnastics
- Country represented: Germany
- Gym: Berliner Turnerschaft

David Richard Genserowski (4 July 1875 – 31 December 1955) was a German gymnast. He competed in the men's individual all-around event at the 1900 Summer Olympics.
