= Noël Bas =

French gymnast

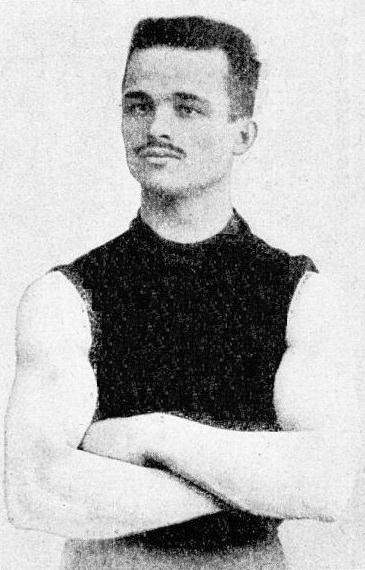

Personal information
- Full name: François Bas
- Born: 25 December 1877 Strenquels, France
- Died: 3 July 1960 (aged 82) Brive-la-Gaillarde, France

Gymnastics career
- Discipline: Men's artistic gymnastics
- Country represented: France
Medal record
Olympic Games
Silver medal – second place	1900 Paris	Combined exercises

François "Noël" Bas (25 December 1877 –3 July 1960) was a French gymnast who competed in the early 20th century. He participated in Gymnastics at the 1900 Summer Olympics in Paris and won the silver medal in the only gymnastic event to take place at the games, the combined exercises. Gustave Sandras won gold.
