= Miroslav Klinger =

Czech politician and sport gymnast

Personal information
- Born: 20 January 1893 Prague, Austria-Hungary
- Died: 10 February 1979 (aged 86) Prague, Czechoslovakia

Gymnastics career
- Discipline: Men's artistic gymnastics
- Country represented: Czechoslovakia
Medal record
Representing Czechoslovakia
World Championships
Gold medal – first place	1922 Ljubljana	Team
Gold medal – first place	1922 Ljubljana	Pommel Horse
Gold medal – first place	1922 Ljubljana	Horizontal Bar
Silver medal – second place	1922 Ljubljana	Parallel Bars

Miroslav Klinger (20 January 1893 – 10 February 1979) was a Czech gymnast who competed for Czechoslovakia in the 1920 Summer Olympics and in the 1924 Summer Olympics. He was born and died in Prague.

In 1920, he was a member of the Czechoslovak gymnastic team, which finished fourth in the team event. Four years later at the 1924 Summer Olympics he participated in the following events:

- Individual all-around - fifth place
- Vault - seventh place
- Pommel horse - seventh place
- Parallel bars - tenth place
- Rings - eleventh place
- Sidehorse vault - twelfth place
- Rope climbing - 24th place
- Horizontal bar - 26th place
- Team all-around - did not finish

Klinger achieved greater success at the 1922 World Championships in Ljubljana where he contributed to the team gold, achieved individual gold on the Pommel Horse and Horizontal Bar, and won silver on the Parallel Bars.

Klinger was an active member and activist of the Sokol organization. During World War II, he was incarcerated in Dachau and Buchenwald concentration camps. In the Czechoslovak parliamentary elections in 1948, he was elected to the National Assembly for the Czech National Social Party. He was a member of parliament until 1960.
