= Pierre Payssé =

French gymnast and teacher

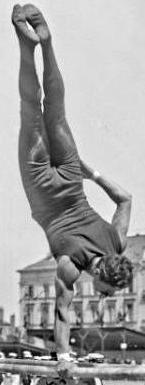
- Pierre Payssé on parallel bars in 1909

Personal information
- Born: 21 November 1873 Paris, France
- Died: 5 December 1938 (aged 65) Corbeil-Essonnes, France

Gymnastics career
- Country represented: France
Medal record
Gymnastics
Representing FRA
World Artistic Gymnastics Championships
Gold medal – first place	1905 Bordeaux	Team all-around
Silver medal – second place	1903 Antwerp	Horizontal bar
Bronze medal – third place	1905 Bordeaux	Horizontal bar
Bronze medal – third place	1905 Bordeaux	Parallel bars
Intercalated Games
Gold medal – first place	1906 Athens	All-around, 5 events
Gold medal – first place	1906 Athens	All-around, 6 events

Pierre Edmond Payssé (21 November 1873 – 5 December 1938) was a French gymnast and teacher. He won two gold medals at the 1906 Intercalated Games in Athens, Greece, and later worked to increase participation in women's sports.

== Gymnastics career ==
At the 1900 Summer Olympics in Paris, France, Payssé competed in the Men's all-around gymnastic event, a 16-event competition that was the only gymnastics event at the Games. He finished fourth, behind fellow Frenchmen Gustave Sandras, Noël Bas and Lucien Démanet. At the 1903 World Artistic Gymnastics Championships, Payssé came joint second with Charles van Hulle and Jules Lecoutre in the horizontal bar event. At the 1905 World Artistic Gymnastics Championships, Payssé was part of the French team that won the men's team all-around event. He came third in the individual horizontal bar and parallel bars events.

Payssé won both the Individual all-around, 5 events and Individual all-around, 6 events competitions at the 1906 Intercalated Games in Athens, Greece. This made him one of only 16 people to win two or more gold medals at the Games. In the same year, Payssé became world champion at the horizontal bar event.

== Teaching career ==
Payssé later worked as a teacher. In 1912, he helped to set up Fémina Sport. Fémina Sports started out as a gymnastics club, but later focused on other sports. Payssé found a permanent location for the club in 1918. In 1915, Fémina Sports competed in France's first all-female interclub athletics competition. In 1917, Payssé helped organise football matches for the women's football team Fémina Sports Paris against male opposition. The matches were played for six months until they were blocked by the Union des Sociétés Françaises de Sports Athlétiques, which banned men's football teams in their union from playing women's football teams. In December 1917, Payssé helped to set up the Fédération des Sociétés Féminines Sportives de France.
