= 1905 World Artistic Gymnastics Championships =

Gymnastics event

- Location: Bordeaux, France

The 2nd Artistic Gymnastics World Championships were held in Bordeaux, France, in conjunction with the 31st Federal Festival of France, on April 22–23, 1905.

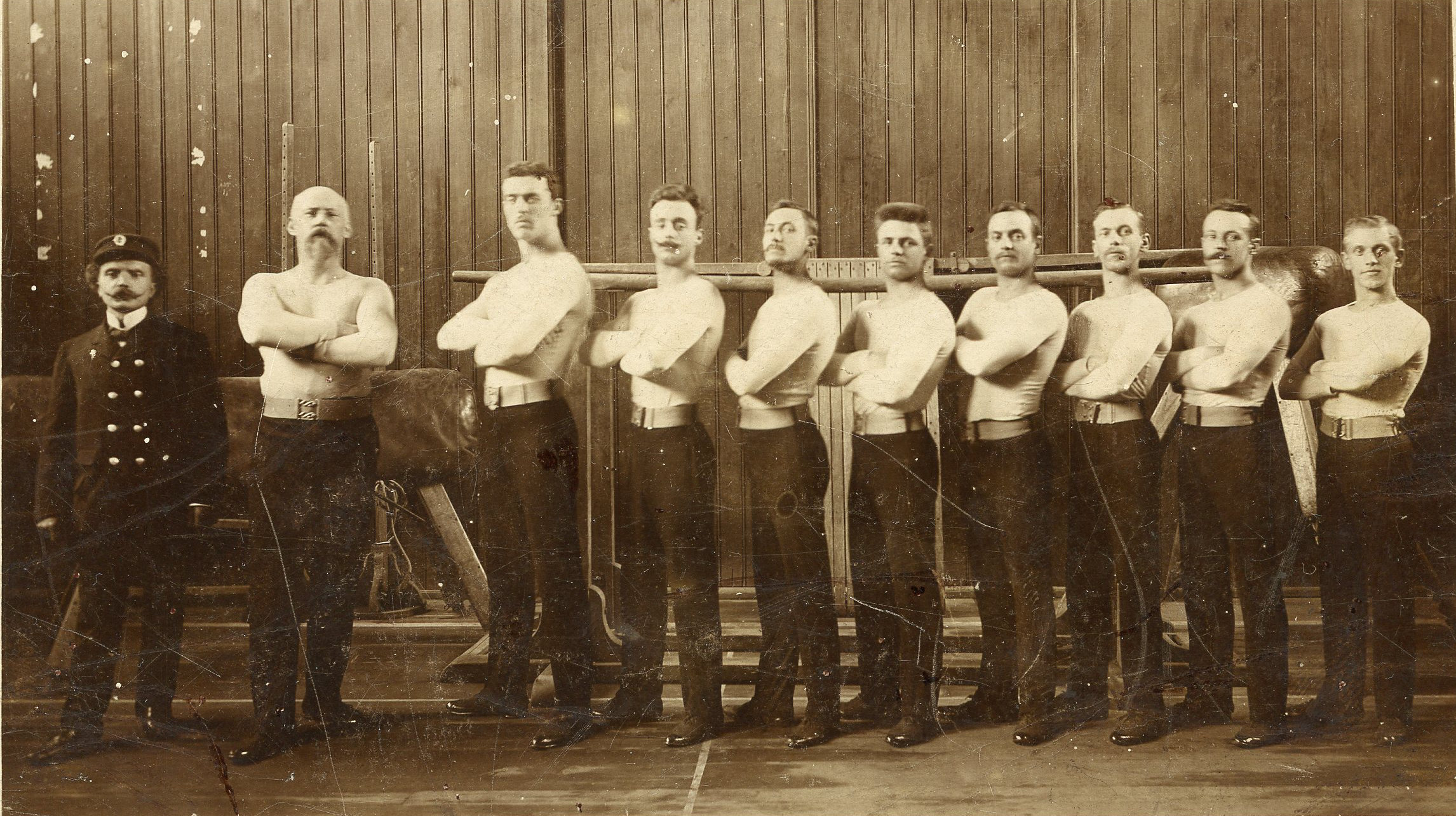
Dutch gymnastics team

The championships consisted at the time only of a team event. The individual all-round scores were introduced in 1922. Individual apparatus scores were recognised subsequently retrospectively. As such no actual individual medals were awarded at these games, the below rankings were conferred retrospectively.

Conversely, contemporaneous, detailed coverage – beyond merely team totals – of select World Championships prior to World War I exists both in the pages of “Slovenski Sokol” magazine (via the Digital Library of Slovenia) and in reproductions of apparently original and contemporaneous Czech source materials (via Gymnastics-History.com) for both the 3rd (1907) and 6th (1913) editions of the World Championships. In the Czech versions of those sources, reproduced by Gymnastics-History.com, both individual all-around scores and apparatus scores are presented for every competitor, and in the Slovenian versions of those sources, individual all-around scores and rankings are reproduced for the top 14 and very last-place competitor for the 1907 Worlds and for every competitor at the 1913 Worlds. Additionally, all of the data that is presented in each of those sources completely matches the data that both the FIG and USAG (the official governing body of the sport of Artistic gymnastics within the USA) present in their respective treatments on the results of these pre-WWI World Championships, with the sole two exceptions of the horizontal bar placing of French Gymnast Francois Vidal and the parallel bars placement of Belgian gymnast Paul Mangin, both at the 1907 World Championships. (In any event, all of these data sources - the Slovenian records, the Gymnastics-History.com's reproduced Czech records, the FIG's records, and the USAG's records - have continually failed to recognize the apparent original human error with respect to the discrepancy between Vidal's and Mangin's scores and rankings. In light of that, all of these data sources remain completely consistent, in terms of the data that they do present, with respect to the results of the pre-WWI editions of these World Championships.)

An article published in the 10 June 2024 issue of The International Journal of the History of Sport (a peer-reviewed journal) claimed that the BFEG’s (the FIG’s predecessor) archives from before 1950 appear to have been lost. However a brief biographical treatment containing a photograph of multiple medals belonging to 1911 World All-Around Champion Ferdinand Steiner on the website of an alma mater of his, the Jiří Wolkera Gymnasium, shows multiple medals with the words "Concorso Ginnastico Internazionale 1911 Torino" embossed onto them. This brief biographical treatment was published at least as far back as 14 January 2017 on the official Facebook website of his alma mater in a photograph album, begun on 29 November 2016, containing other such brief biographical treatments of its notable alumni. That pictoral presentation of Steiner’s medals helps suggest that individual medals were awarded for those 1911 World Championships as they were from the same locale and year as the 1911 Worlds, and with the original title of the competition being printed on those medals, this further helps suggest that these individual medals were awarded contemporaneously.

== Men's all around ==
| Rank | Athlete | Total |
|---|---|---|
| 1. | (France) Marcel Lalue | 185.500 |
| 2. | (France) Daniel Lavielle | 184.250 |
| 3. | (France) Lucien Démanet | 179.25 |
| 4. | (France) Georges Dejaeghère | 176.50 |
| 5. | (France) Pierre Payssé | 173.75 |
| 6. | (Netherlands) H.R. Reeder | 169.75 |
| 7. (tie) | (France) Joseph Martinez | 168.75 |
| 7. (tie) | (Netherlands) Ferdinand Lambert | 168.75 |
| 9. | (Netherlands) Johan Schmitt | 163.75 |
| 10. | (Belgium) Jean de Hoe | 156.25 |
| 11. | (Belgium) Paul Mangin | 154.50 |
| 12. | (Belgium) Albert van de Roye | 151.50 |

== Men's team all around ==
| Rank | Members | Total |
|---|---|---|
| 1. | France; Georges Dejagere, Lucien Démanet, Marcel Lalu, Daniel Lavielle, Joseph Martinez, Pierre Payssé | 990.000 |
| 2. | Netherlands; D. de Boer, G.J. Douw, B. Florijn, Dirk Janssen, Jan Janssen, Jan Jacob Kieft, Ferdinand Lambert, J.H. Reder, Johan Schmitt | 941.750 |
| 3. | Belgium; Jean de Hoe, Paul Mangin, Auguste van Ackere, Albert van de Roye, Leon van de Roye, Vital Verdickt | 906.750 |
| 4. | Luxembourg; Unknown | 784.75 |

== Men's horizontal bar ==
| Rank | Athlete | Total |
|---|---|---|
| 1. | (France) Marcel Lalue | 36.000 |
| 2. | (France) Joseph Martinez | 35.750 |
| 3. | (France) Pierre Payssé | 35.500 |
| 3. | (France) Lucien Démanet | 35.500 |

== Men's parallel bars ==
| Rank | Athlete | Total |
|---|---|---|
| 1. | (France) Joseph Martinez | 33.500 |
| 1. | (France) Marcel Lalue | 33.500 |
| 3. | (France) Pierre Payssé | 32.750 |

== Men's pommel horse ==
| Rank | Athlete | Total |
|---|---|---|
| 1. | (France) Georges Dejagere | 34.750 |
| 2. | (France) Marcel Lalue | 34.500 |
| 3. | (France) Daniel Lavielle | 33.750 |

== Medal table ==
| Rank | Nation | Gold | Silver | Bronze | Total |
|---|---|---|---|---|---|
| 1 | France (FRA) | 6 | 3 | 5 | 14 |
| 2 | Netherlands (NED) | 0 | 1 | 0 | 1 |
| 3 | Belgium (BEL) | 0 | 0 | 1 | 1 |
| Totals (3 entries) | | 6 | 4 | 6 | 16 |
