= 1922 World Artistic Gymnastics Championships =

Gymnastics competition

- Location: Ljubljana, Kingdom of Yugoslavia

The 7th Artistic Gymnastics World Championships were held in Ljubljana, Kingdom of Serbs, Croats and Slovenes (now Slovenia) on August 11–12, 1922.

This was the first international tournament arranged under the auspices of FIG at which individual medals for all-round performance were awarded. However, the individual medals for apparatus were not awarded at the 1922 tournament, those discussed below were awarded by FIG retrospectively.

Conversely, please note that contemporaneous, detailed coverage, beyond merely team totals, of select World Championships prior to World War I exists both in the pages of "Slovenski Sokol" magazine (via the Digital Library of Slovenia) and in reproductions of apparently original and contemporaneous Czech source materials (via Gymnastics-History.com) for both the 3rd (1907) and 6th (1913) editions of the World Championships. In the Czech versions of those sources, reproduced by Gymnastics-History.com, both individual all-around scores and apparatus scores are presented for every competitor, and in the Slovenian versions of those sources, individual all-around scores and rankings are reproduced for the top 14 and very last-place competitor for the 1907 Worlds and for every competitor at the 1913 Worlds. Additionally, all of the data that is presented in each of those sources completely matches the data that both the FIG and USAG (the official governing body of the sport of Artistic gymnastics within the USA) present in their respective treatments on the results of these pre-WWI World Championships, with the sole two exceptions of the horizontal bar placing of French Gymnast Francois Vidal and the parallel bars placement of Belgian gymnast Paul Mangin, both at the 1907 World Championships. (In any event, all of these data sources - the Slovenian records, the Gymnastics-History.com's reproduced Czech records, the FIG's records, and the USAG's records - have continually failed to recognize the apparent original human error with respect to the discrepancy between Vidal's and Mangin's scores and rankings. In light of that, all of these data sources remain completely consistent, in terms of the data that they do present, with respect to the results of the pre-WWI editions of these World Championships.)

Additionally, please note that in lieu of an article published in the 10 June 2024 issue of The International Journal of the History of Sport (a peer-reviewed journal) claiming that the BFEG's (the FIG's predecessor) archives from before 1950 appear to have been lost, a brief biographical treatment containing a photograph of multiple medals belonging to 1911 World All-Around Champion Ferdinand Steiner on the website of an alma mater of his, the Jiří Wolkera Gymnasium, shows multiple medals with the words "Concorso Ginnastico Internazionale 1911 Torino" embossed onto them. This brief biographical treatment was published at least as far back as 14 January 2017 on the official Facebook website of his alma mater in a photograph album, begun on 29 November 2016, containing other such brief biographical treatments of its notable alumni. That pictoral presentation of Steiner's medals helps suggest that individual medals were awarded for those 1911 World Championships as they were from the same locale and year as the 1911 Worlds, and with the original title of the competition being printed on those medals, this further helps suggest that these individual medals were awarded contemporaneously.

== Medal table ==
Rank	Nation	Gold	Silver	Bronze	Total
1	Yugoslavia	6	6	1	13
2	Czechoslovakia (TCH)	6	3	0	9
3	France (FRA)	0	0	1	1
Totals (3 entries)		12	9	2	23

== Team competition ==
Rank	Nation	Prelim. Calisthenics	Behavior	Total	Parallel bars	Behavior	Total	Horizontal bar	Behavior	Total	Pommel horse	Behavior	Total	Rings (gymnastics)	Behavior	Total	Gymnastics Events Totals	High Jump	Shot Put	100 meters	50 meter swim	Athletics Events Totals	Team Grand Totals
1st place, gold medalist(s)	Czechoslovakia	174.5	1.75	176.25	107.25	2	109.25	112.25	2	114.25	110.75	1.75	112.5	117	2	119	631.25	27	31.25	31	52.5	141.75	773
2nd place, silver medalist(s)	Yugoslavia	174.75	2	176.75	112	2	114	108	2	110	109.5	1.75	111.5	110.75	1.75	112.5	624.5	32	29	20	58.5	139.5	764
3rd place, bronze medalist(s)	France	163.5	1.25	164.75	92	1	93	99.25	2	101.25	82.75	1.25	102.75	101	1.75	102.75	564.5	21	11.75	17.5	40	90.25	636
4	Belgium	165.25	1.75	167	87.75	2	89.75	99	2	101	87.5	1.5	89	106.25	2	108.25	555	21	6.5	24	21.5	73	628
5	Luxembourg	149.25	1	150.25	84.25	2	86.25	80.25	1.25	81.5	81	1.5	82.5	78.5	1	79.5	480	15	17.5	16.5	30.75	79.75	559.75

=== Individual Standings ===
Rank	Nation	Gymnast	Prelim. Calisthenics	Gymnastics Events						Athletics Events						Individual Grand Totals
Rank	Nation	Gymnast	Prelim. Calisthenics	Parallel bars	Horizontal bar	Pommel horse	Rings (gymnastics)	Gymnastics Events Totals	Gymnastics Events Totals Rank	High Jump	Shot Put	100 meters	50 meter swim	Athletics Events Totals	Athletics Events Totals Rank	Individual Grand Totals
(gold) (tie)	Yugoslavia	Peter Sumi	29.5	18.75	19.75	19	19.75	77.25	3	7	6	5.5	10	28.5	3	135.25
(gold) (tie)	Czechoslovakia	František Pecháček	28.25	18	19	18.5	19	74.5	7	7	10	8	7.5	32.5	1	135.25
3rd place, bronze medalist(s)	Yugoslavia	Stane Derganc	29.25	19	19.25	18	17.25	73.5	8	5	10	4.5	10	29.5	2	132.25
4	Czechoslovakia	Miroslav Klinger	29	19	19.75	19.25	19.5	77.5	2	5	4.5	5	10	24.5	4	131
5	Yugoslavia	Stane Vidmar	29.25	19	19	18.5	18.25	74.75	6	5	5	4	10	24	5	128
6	Czechoslovakia	Stanislav Jindrich	30	19	18.5	19	19.5	76	4	3	4	3	9.5	19.5	11	125.5
7	Czechoslovakia	Josef Malý	29.5	16.5	18.25	17.5	19.75	72	9	4	7.75	6	6	23.75	6	125.25
8	Yugoslavia	Leon Štukelj	27.75	20	19.75	19	19.75	78.5	1	5	0	3.5	9.5	18	15	124.25
9	Czechoslovakia	Miroslav Karásek	28.25	18	19.25	18.75	19.75	75.75	5	4	1.25	4.5	10	19.75	10	123.75
10	Czechoslovakia	František Vaneček	29.5	16.75	17.5	17.75	19.5	71.75	10	4	3.75	4.5	9.5	21.75	7	122.75
11	Yugoslavia	Slavko Hlastan	29.75	16.25	18.25	17.75	18.25	70.5	11	5	5.25	1	9.5	20.75	9	121
12	France	Jean Gounot	29.25	16.25	18.5	18	17.75	70.5	12	6	2.25	2.5	6.5	17.25	17	117
13	France	Alex Pannetier	18.5	17	17.5	15.5	16.5	66.5	15	7	0	4.5	9.5	21	8	116
14	Yugoslavia	Vlado Simončič	29.25	19	12	17.25	17.5	65.75	17	5	2.75	1.5	9.5	18.75	13	113.75
15	Belgium	Francois Verboven	26.5	13.75	17.75	16	18	65.5	18	4	2.5	4	8	18.5	14	110.5
16	France	Marco Torrès	28	16	18.75	15	18.5	68.25	13	3	0	4	7	14	20	110.25
17	Belgium	Jean Verboven	28.5	15.75	12	15	17	59.75	22	3	1.75	5.5	7.5	17.75	16	106
18	Belgium	Louis De Winter	28.25	14	18.5	14.75	18.75	66	16	3	2.25	5.5	0	10.75	25	105
19	Luxembourg	Emil Münhofen	28	14.5	16	13.5	13.25	57.25	25	5	10	4.5	0	19.5	11	104.75
20	Belgium	Jean Gibens	24.25	16.25	16	17.5	18.25	68	14	1	0	1.5	6	8.5	29	100.75
21 (tie)	France	Louis Marty	23.75	17.25	16.75	14.75	15.75	64.5	19	1	2	1	6.5	10.5	26	98.75
21 (tie)	Belgium	Gust. Verstraeten	29	15.25	18.5	10.75	17.75	62.25	20	5	0	2.5	0	7.5	30	98.75
23	France	Jacques Moser	27	14	15	14	17.25	60.25	21	1	1.5	1.5	7	11	23	98.25
24	Belgium	Gust. Gyselinck	28.75	12.75	16.25	13.5	16.5	59	23	5	0	5	0	10	27	97.75
25	Luxembourg	Nicolas Roeser	23.5	13	16	16.5	13.25	58.75	24	3	3.5	4.5	0	11	23	93.25
26	Luxembourg	Emil François	23.75	13	8.5	15.25	14.75	51.5	28	3	0	2	10	15	19	90.25
27	Luxembourg	Robert Leroy	26.75	13.75	13.75	8.5	14.25	50.25	29	2	2	1.5	7	12.5	22	89.5
28	Luxembourg	Francois Zuang	22	17.5	11.75	16.25	8.75	54.25	26	2	2	3	5.75	12.75	21	89
29	France	Robert Morin	27	11.5	12.75	5.5	15.25	45	30	3	6	4	3.5	16.5	18	88.5
30	Luxembourg	Jos. Knepper	25.25	12.5	14.25	11	14.25	52	27	0	0	1	8	9	28	86.25

=== Pommel horse ===
Rank	Nationality	Athlete	Total
1	Czechoslovakia	Miroslav Klinger	19,250
2	Yugoslavia	Leon Štukelj	19,000
2	Yugoslavia	Peter Šumi	19,000
2	Czechoslovakia	Stanislav Indruch	19,000

=== Rings ===
Rank	Nationality	Athlete	Total
1	Yugoslavia	Leon Štukelj	19,750
1	Yugoslavia	Peter Šumi	19,750
1	Czechoslovakia	Joseph Maly	19,750
1	Czechoslovakia	Miroslav Karásek	19,750

=== Parallel bars ===
Rank	Nationality	Athlete	Total
1	Yugoslavia	Leon Štukelj	20,000
2	Yugoslavia	Stane Derganc	19,000
2	Yugoslavia	Stane Vidmar	19,000
2	Yugoslavia	Vladimir Simončič	19,000
2	Czechoslovakia	Miroslav Klinger	19,000
2	Czechoslovakia	Stanislav Indruch	19,000

=== Horizontal bar ===
Rank	Nationality	Athlete	Total
1	Yugoslavia	Leon Štukelj	20,000
1	Yugoslavia	Peter Šumi	20,000
1	Czechoslovakia	Miroslav Klinger	20,000

== Sources ==
- Prvi ljubljanski stadion (in Slovene)
