= Auguste Castille =

French gymnast

Auguste Jean Baptiste Castille
- Born: 12 May 1883 Elbeuf, France
- Died: 17 September 1971 (aged 88) Sotteville-lès-Rouen, France

Gymnastics career
- Discipline: Men's artistic gymnastics
- Country represented: France
Medal record
Representing France
World Championships
Gold medal – first place	1909 Luxembourg	Team
Silver medal – second place	1909 Luxembourg	Parallel Bars

Auguste Jean Baptiste Castille (12 May 1883 – 17 September 1971) was a French gymnast. He competed at the 1900 Summer Olympics and the 1908 Summer Olympics. Additionally, he competed at the 1909 World Artistic Gymnastics Championships where he was part of the championship-winning team. There were no individual awards at the 1909 tournament, with individual medals for all-round performance only being introduced in 1922 and for apparatus some years later, but the FIG has retrospectively recognised Castille as placing second on parallel bars in the 1909 tournament.
