= Joseph Castiglioni =

French gymnast

- Born: 27 September 1877 Oran, French Algeria
- Died: 7 June 1959 (aged 81) Algiers, French Algeria

Gymnastics career
- Discipline: Men's artistic gymnastics
- Country represented: France
- Club: Société de Gymnastique La Bel-Abbésienne
Medal record
Men's artistic gymnastics
Representing France
World Championships
Gold medal – first place	1909 Luxembourg	Team
Silver medal – second place	1907 Prague	Team

Joseph Castiglioni (27 September 1877 – 7 June 1959) was a French gymnast. He competed at the 1900 Summer Olympics and the 1908 Summer Olympics.

== Biography ==
After winning a silver medal in the team event at the 1907 Artistic Gymnastics World Championships, he was crowned world champion in the team all-around competition in 1909.

He competed in the 1900 Summer Olympics, placing fifteenth in the individual all-around competition, and in the 1908 Summer Olympics, finishing twentieth.
