= Daniel Lavielle =

French gymnast

Laurent Daniel Jean Lavielle
- Born: 25 June 1880 La Teste-de-Buch, France
- Died: 30 March 1960 (aged 80)

Gymnastics career
- Discipline: Men's artistic gymnastics
- Country represented: France
Medal record
Representing France
World Championships
Gold medal – first place	1905 Bordeaux	Team
Silver medal – second place	1905 Bordeaux	All-Around
Bronze medal – third place	1905 Bordeaux	Pommel Horse

Laurent Daniel Jean Lavielle (born 25 June 1880, date of death unknown) was a French gymnast. He competed in the men's individual all-around event at the 1900 Summer Olympics. Additionally, he competed at the 1905 World Artistic Gymnastics Championships, where he was part of the championship-winning French team. Whilst individual scores were not given until 1922, FIG has retrospectively conferred, on the basis of scores given in the team event, silver in the all-around combined exercises and bronze on the pommel horse for his performance at the 1905 international tournament.
