= Lucien Démanet =

French gymnast (1874–1943)

- Full name: Georges Lucien Démanet
- Born: 6 December 1874 Limont-Fontaine, France
- Died: 20 June 1943 (aged 68) Denain, France

Gymnastics career
- Discipline: Men's artistic gymnastics
- Country represented: France
Medal record
Olympic Games
Representing France
Bronze medal – third place	1900 Paris	Combined exercises
Bronze medal – third place	1920 Antwerp	Team
World Championships
Gold medal – first place	1905 Bordeaux	Team
Bronze medal – third place	1905 Bordeaux	All-Around
Bronze medal – third place	1905 Bordeaux	Horizontal bar

Georges Lucien Démanet (6 December 1874 – 20 June 1943) was a French gymnast who competed at the turn of the 20th century. He participated in Gymnastics at the 1900 Summer Olympics in Paris and placed third (bronze medals were not awarded until 1904) with a total score of 293 points in the only gymnastic event to take place at the games, the combined exercises. Gustave Sandras won gold with a score of 302 points and Noel Bas won silver. Additionally, he competed at the 1905 World Artistic Gymnastics Championships where he was a part of the championship-winning team.
