= Joseph Martinez =

Algerian-French gymnast

- Martinez in 1909

Personal information
- Born: 1878 Oran, French Algeria
- Died: Unknown

Gymnastics career
- Country represented: France
Medal record
Representing France
World Championships
Gold medal – first place	1903 Antwerp	Team
Gold medal – first place	1903 Antwerp	All-around
Gold medal – first place	1903 Antwerp	Rings
Gold medal – first place	1903 Antwerp	Parallel Bars
Gold medal – first place	1903 Antwerp	Horizontal Bar
Gold medal – first place	1905 Bordeaux	Team
Gold medal – first place	1905 Bordeaux	Parallel Bars
Silver medal – second place	1905 Bordeaux	Horizontal Bar
Gold medal – first place	1909 Luxembourg	Team
Gold medal – first place	1909 Luxembourg	Parallel Bars
Gold medal – first place	1909 Luxembourg	Horizontal Bar

Joseph Martinez (born 1878, date of death unknown) was an Algerian-French gymnast. He competed in the men's individual all-around event at the 1900 Summer Olympics.

Joseph Martinez is officially recognized by both the FIG (the official governing body of the sport of Artistic Gymnastics) and USAG (the official governing body of the sport of Artistic gymnastics within the USA) as the 1903 World All-Around Champion in the sport of Artistic gymnastics.

Martinez attended the international gymnastics tournament in Antwerp the international gymnastics tournament in Antwerp in 1903. As a result of the retrospective awarding of scoring for individual performances when these started to be recognised after 1922, Martinez's performance at the 1903 tournament is scored as the best all-round performance.
