= Marcel Lalu =

French gymnast

- Born: 24 March 1882 Limoges, France
- Died: 3 May 1951 (aged 69) Limoges, France

Gymnastics career
- Discipline: Men's artistic gymnastics
- Country represented: France
Medal record
Representing France
World Championships
Gold medal – first place	1905 Bordeaux	Team
Gold medal – first place	1905 Bordeaux	All-Around
Gold medal – first place	1905 Bordeaux	Horizontal bar
Gold medal – first place	1905 Bordeaux	Parallel bars
Silver medal – second place	1905 Bordeaux	Pommel horse

Marcel Lalu (24 March 1882 in Limoges – 3 May 1951 in Limoges) was a French gymnast who competed in the 1900 Summer Olympics, in the 1908 Summer Olympics, and in the 1912 Summer Olympics. In 1900, he finished eighth in the combined exercises competition, which was the only Olympic gymnastic event. Eight years later he finished seventh in the 1908 all-around competition and at the 1912 Games he finished again seventh in the all-around contest.

Marcel Lalu is officially recognized by both the FIG (the official governing body of the sport of Artistic Gymnastics) and USAG (the official governing body of the sport of Artistic gymnastics within the USA) as the 1905 World All-Around Champion in the sport of Artistic gymnastics.
