= Gustave Sandras =

French gymnast

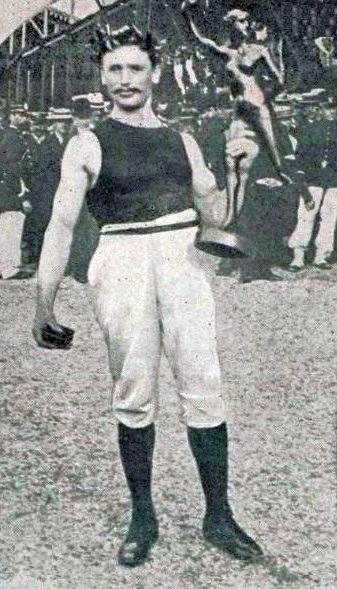
- Gustave Sandras in 1900

Personal information
- Full name: Silvaine Gustave Sandras
- Born: 24 February 1872 Croix, Nord, France
- Died: 21 June 1951 (aged 79) Flers-lez-Lille, France

Gymnastics career
- Discipline: Men's artistic gymnastics
- Country represented: France
Medal record
Men's gymnastics
Representing France
Olympic Games
Gold medal – first place	1900 Paris	Combined exercises

Silvaine Gustave Sandras (24 February 1872 – 21 June 1951) was a French gymnast who competed in the early 20th century. He participated in the 1900 Summer Olympics in Paris, France, and won the equivalent (see 1900 Summer Olympics) of a gold medal in the only gymnastic event to take place at the games, the combined exercises (see Gymnastics at the 1900 Summer Olympics).

== Sources ==
- Evans, Hilary; Gjerde, Arild; Heijmans, Jeroen; Mallon, Bill; et al. "Gustave Sandras". Olympics at Sports-Reference.com. Sports Reference LLC. Archived from the original on 2020-04-17.
