= World Artistic Gymnastics Championships – Men's floor =

The men's floor exercise competition at the World Artistic Gymnastics Championships was first contested in 1930. It has been held in every year since its inception.

Three medals are awarded: gold for first place, silver for second place, and bronze for third place. Tie breakers have not been used in every year. In the event of a tie between two gymnasts, both names are listed, and the following position (second for a tie for first, third for a tie for second) is left empty because a medal was not awarded for that position. If three gymnastics tied for a position, the following two positions are left empty.

== Medalists ==
Bold number in brackets denotes record number of victories.

| Year | Location | Gold | Silver | Bronze |
|---|---|---|---|---|
| 1930 | Luxembourg | (Kingdom of Yugoslavia) Josip Primožič | (Czechoslovakia) Emanuel Löffler | (France) Alfred Krauss |
| 1934 | (Hungary) Budapest | (Switzerland) Georges Miez | (Switzerland) Eugen Mack | (Germany) Kurt Krötzsch |
| 1938 | (Czechoslovakia) Prague | (Czechoslovakia) Jan Gajdoš | (Czechoslovakia) Alois Hudec (Switzerland) Eugen Mack | —N/a |
| 1942 | Not held due to World War II | | | |
| 1950 | (Switzerland) Basel | (Switzerland) Ernst Gebendinger (Switzerland) Josef Stalder | —N/a | (France) Raymond Dot |
| 1954 | (Italy) Rome | (Soviet Union) Valentin Muratov (Japan) Masao Takemoto | —N/a | (Sweden) William Thoresson |
| 1958 | (Soviet Union) Moscow | (Japan) Masao Takemoto | (Japan) Takashi Ono | (Soviet Union) Yuri Titov |
| 1962 | (Czechoslovakia) Prague | (Japan) Nobuyuki Aihara (Japan) Yukio Endō | —N/a | (Italy) Franco Menichelli |
| 1966 | (West Germany) Dortmund | (Japan) Akinori Nakayama | (Japan) Yukio Endō | (Italy) Franco Menichelli |
| 1970 | (Socialist Federal Republic of Yugoslavia) Ljubljana | (Japan) Akinori Nakayama | (Japan) Eizō Kenmotsu | (Japan) Takeshi Katō |
| 1974 | (Bulgaria) Varna | (Japan) Shigeru Kasamatsu | (Japan) Hiroshi Kajiyama | (Bulgaria) Andrei Keranov |
| 1978 | (France) Strasbourg | (United States) Kurt Thomas | (Japan) Shigeru Kasamatsu | (Soviet Union) Alexander Dityatin |
| 1979 | (United States) Fort Worth | (East Germany) Roland Brückner (United States) Kurt Thomas | —N/a | (Soviet Union) Aleksandr Tkachyov |
| 1981 | (Soviet Union) Moscow | (Soviet Union) Yuri Korolyov (China) Li Yuejiu | —N/a | (Japan) Kōji Gushiken |
| 1983 | (Hungary) Budapest | (China) Tong Fei | (Soviet Union) Dmitry Bilozerchev | (China) Li Ning |
| 1985 | (Canada) Montreal | (China) Tong Fei | (Soviet Union) Yuri Korolyov | (China) Li Ning |
| 1987 | (Netherlands) Rotterdam | (China) Lou Yun | (Soviet Union) Vladimir Artemov | (Bulgaria) Lubomir Geraskov |
| 1989 | (West Germany) Stuttgart | (Soviet Union) Ihor Korobchynskyi | (Soviet Union) Vladimir Artemov | (China) Li Chunyang |
| 1991 | (United States) Indianapolis | (Soviet Union) Ihor Korobchynskyi | (Soviet Union) Vitaly Scherbo | (Japan) Daisuke Nishikawa |
| 1992 | (France) Paris | (Commonwealth of Independent States) Ihor Korobchynskyi | (Commonwealth of Independent States) Vitaly Scherbo | (Germany) Maik Krahberg |
| 1993 | (United Kingdom) Birmingham | (Ukraine) Hrihoriy Misyutin | (Belarus) Vitaly Scherbo (United Kingdom) Neil Thomas | —N/a |
| 1994 | (Australia) Brisbane | (Belarus) Vitaly Scherbo | (Greece) Ioannis Melissanidis (United Kingdom) Neil Thomas | —N/a |
| 1995 | (Japan) Sabae | (Belarus) Vitaly Scherbo | (China) Li Xiaoshuang | (Ukraine) Hrihoriy Misyutin |
| 1996 | (Puerto Rico) San Juan | (Belarus) Vitaly Scherbo | (Russia) Aleksey Voropayev | (Ukraine) Hrihoriy Misyutin |
| 1997 | (Switzerland) Lausanne | (Russia) Alexei Nemov | (France) Dimitri Karbanenko | (China) Li Xiaopeng |
| 1999 | (China) Tianjin | (Russia) Alexei Nemov | (Spain) Gervasio Deferr | (China) Xing Aowei |
| 2001 | (Belgium) Ghent | (Romania) Marian Drăgulescu (Bulgaria) Yordan Yovchev | —N/a | (Latvia) Igors Vihrovs |
| 2002 | (Hungary) Debrecen | (Romania) Marian Drăgulescu | (Bulgaria) Yordan Yovchev | (United States) Paul Hamm |
| 2003 | (United States) Anaheim | (United States) Paul Hamm (Bulgaria) Yordan Yovchev | —N/a | (Canada) Kyle Shewfelt |
| 2005 | (Australia) Melbourne | (Brazil) Diego Hypólito | (Canada) Brandon O'Neill | (Hungary) Róbert Gál (China) Liang Fuliang |
| 2006 | (Denmark) Aarhus | (Romania) Marian Drăgulescu | (Brazil) Diego Hypólito | (Canada) Kyle Shewfelt |
| 2007 | (Germany) Stuttgart | (Brazil) Diego Hypólito | (Spain) Gervasio Deferr | (Japan) Hisashi Mizutori |
| 2009 | (United Kingdom) London | (Romania) Marian Drăgulescu (4) | (China) Zou Kai | (Israel) Alexander Shatilov |
| 2010 | (Netherlands) Rotterdam | (Greece) Eleftherios Kosmidis | (Japan) Kōhei Uchimura | (United Kingdom) Daniel Purvis |
| 2011 | (Japan) Tokyo | (Japan) Kōhei Uchimura | (China) Zou Kai | (Brazil) Diego Hypólito (Israel) Alexander Shatilov |
| 2013 | (Belgium) Antwerp | (Japan) Kenzō Shirai | (United States) Jacob Dalton | (Japan) Kōhei Uchimura |
| 2014 | (China) Nanning | (Russia) Denis Ablyazin | (Japan) Kenzō Shirai | (Brazil) Diego Hypólito |
| 2015 | (United Kingdom) Glasgow | (Japan) Kenzō Shirai | (United Kingdom) Max Whitlock | (Spain) Rayderley Zapata |
| 2017 | (Canada) Montreal | (Japan) Kenzō Shirai | (Israel) Artem Dolgopyat | (United States) Yul Moldauer |
| 2018 | (Qatar) Doha | (Russia) Artur Dalaloyan | (Japan) Kenzō Shirai | (Philippines) Carlos Yulo |
| 2019 | (Germany) Stuttgart | (Philippines) Carlos Yulo | (Israel) Artem Dolgopyat | (China) Xiao Ruoteng |
| 2021 | (Japan) Kitakyushu | (Italy) Nicola Bartolini | (Japan) Kazuki Minami | (Finland) Emil Soravuo |
| 2022 | (United Kingdom) Liverpool | (United Kingdom) Giarnni Regini-Moran | (Japan) Daiki Hashimoto | (Japan) Ryosuke Doi |
| 2023 | (Belgium) Antwerp | (Israel) Artem Dolgopyat | (Japan) Kazuki Minami | (Kazakhstan) Milad Karimi |
| 2025 | (Indonesia) Jakarta | (United Kingdom) Jake Jarman | (United Kingdom) Luke Whitehouse | (Philippines) Carlos Yulo |
| 2026 | (Netherlands) Rotterdam | (United States) Frederick Richard | (United Kingdom) Jake Jarman | (Israel) Artem Dolgopyat |

== All-time medal count ==
Last updated after the 2026 World Championships.

| Rank | Nation | Gold | Silver | Bronze | Total |
|---|---|---|---|---|---|
| 1 | Japan | 11 | 11 | 6 | 28 |
| 2 | Soviet Union | 4 | 5 | 3 | 12 |
| 3 | China | 4 | 3 | 7 | 14 |
| 4 | United States | 4 | 1 | 2 | 7 |
| 5 | Russia | 4 | 1 | 0 | 5 |
| 6 | Romania | 4 | 0 | 0 | 4 |
| 7 | Switzerland | 3 | 2 | 0 | 5 |
| 8 | Belarus | 3 | 1 | 0 | 4 |
| 9 | Great Britain | 2 | 5 | 1 | 8 |
| 10 | Brazil | 2 | 1 | 2 | 5 |
| 10 | Bulgaria | 2 | 1 | 2 | 5 |
| 12 | Israel | 1 | 2 | 3 | 6 |
| 13 | Czechoslovakia | 1 | 2 | 0 | 3 |
| 14 | CIS ^{[a]} | 1 | 1 | 0 | 2 |
| 14 | Greece | 1 | 1 | 0 | 2 |
| 16 | Italy | 1 | 0 | 2 | 3 |
| 16 | Philippines | 1 | 0 | 2 | 3 |
| 16 | Ukraine | 1 | 0 | 2 | 3 |
| 19 | East Germany | 1 | 0 | 0 | 1 |
| 19 | Yugoslavia | 1 | 0 | 0 | 1 |
| 21 | Spain | 0 | 2 | 1 | 3 |
| 22 | Canada | 0 | 1 | 2 | 3 |
| 22 | France | 0 | 1 | 2 | 3 |
| 24 | Germany | 0 | 0 | 2 | 2 |
| 25 | Finland | 0 | 0 | 1 | 1 |
| 25 | Hungary | 0 | 0 | 1 | 1 |
| 25 | Kazakhstan | 0 | 0 | 1 | 1 |
| 25 | Latvia | 0 | 0 | 1 | 1 |
| 25 | Sweden | 0 | 0 | 1 | 1 |
| Totals (29 entries) | | 52 | 41 | 44 | 137 |

Note

- ^[a] Official FIG documents credit medals earned by athletes from former Soviet Union at the 1992 World Artistic Gymnastics Championships in Paris, France, as medals for CIS (Commonwealth of Independent States).

== Multiple medalists ==
| Rank | Gymnast | Nation | Years | Gold | Silver | Bronze | Total |
|---|---|---|---|---|---|---|---|
| 1 | Marian Drăgulescu | Romania | 2001–2009 | 4 | 0 | 0 | 4 |
| 2 | Vitaly Scherbo | Soviet Union; CIS; Belarus | 1991–1996 | 3 | 3 | 0 | 6 |
| 3 | Kenzō Shirai | Japan | 2013–2018 | 3 | 2 | 0 | 5 |
| 4 | Ihor Korobchynskyi | Soviet Union; CIS | 1989–1992 | 3 | 0 | 0 | 3 |
| 5 | Diego Hypólito | Brazil | 2005–2014 | 2 | 1 | 2 | 5 |
| 6 | Yordan Yovchev | Bulgaria | 2001–2003 | 2 | 1 | 0 | 3 |
| 7 | Akinori Nakayama | Japan | 1966–1970 | 2 | 0 | 0 | 2 |
| 7 | Alexei Nemov | Russia | 1997–1999 | 2 | 0 | 0 | 2 |
| 7 | Masao Takemoto | Japan | 1954–1958 | 2 | 0 | 0 | 2 |
| 7 | Kurt Thomas | United States | 1978–1979 | 2 | 0 | 0 | 2 |
| 7 | Tong Fei | United States | 1983–1985 | 2 | 0 | 0 | 2 |
| 12 | Artem Dolgopyat | Israel | 2017–2026 | 1 | 2 | 1 | 4 |
| 13 | Kōhei Uchimura | Japan | 2010–2013 | 1 | 1 | 1 | 3 |
| 14 | Yukio Endō | Japan | 1962–1966 | 1 | 1 | 0 | 2 |
| 14 | Jake Jarman | Great Britain | 2025–2026 | 1 | 1 | 0 | 2 |
| 14 | Shigeru Kasamatsu | Japan | 1974–1978 | 1 | 1 | 0 | 2 |
| 14 | Yuri Korolyov | Soviet Union | 1981–1985 | 1 | 1 | 0 | 2 |
| 18 | Hrihoriy Misyutin | Ukraine | 1993–1996 | 1 | 0 | 2 | 3 |
| 18 | Carlos Yulo | Philippines | 2018–2025 | 1 | 0 | 2 | 3 |
| 20 | Paul Hamm | United States | 2002–2003 | 1 | 0 | 1 | 2 |
| 21 | Vladimir Artemov | Soviet Union | 1987–1989 | 0 | 2 | 0 | 2 |
| 21 | Gervasio Deferr | Spain | 1999–2007 | 0 | 2 | 0 | 2 |
| 21 | Eugen Mack | Switzerland | 1934–1938 | 0 | 2 | 0 | 2 |
| 21 | Kazuki Minami | Japan | 2021–2023 | 0 | 2 | 0 | 2 |
| 21 | Neil Thomas | Great Britain | 1993–1994 | 0 | 2 | 0 | 2 |
| 21 | Zou Kai | China | 2009–2011 | 0 | 2 | 0 | 2 |
| 27 | Li Ning | China | 1983–1985 | 0 | 0 | 2 | 2 |
| 27 | Franco Menichelli | Italy | 1962–1966 | 0 | 0 | 2 | 2 |
| 27 | Alexander Shatilov | Israel | 2009–2011 | 0 | 0 | 2 | 2 |
| 27 | Kyle Shewfelt | Canada | 2003–2006 | 0 | 0 | 2 | 2 |
