= Jan Karafiát (gymnast) =

Czech gymnast

Gymnastics career
- Discipline: Men's artistic gymnastics
- Country represented: Czechoslovakia
Medal record
Representing Czechoslovakia
World Championships
Gold medal – first place	1926 Lyon	Team
Gold medal – first place	1926 Lyon	Pommel Horse

Jan Karafiát was a Czech gymnast, representing Czechoslovakia.

A member of the 1924 Czechoslovak Olympic team, Karafiát's most significant competitive achievements took place at the 1926 World Championships. There, he helped his Czechoslovak team to gold in the team competition. He also won gold in the pommel horse, and came in fourth in the individual overall competition, which Peter Sumi won. In the pommel horse, Czechoslovakia won all three medals, with Jan Gajdoš winning silver, and Ladislav Vácha winning bronze.
