= Emanuel Löffler =

Czech gymnast (1901–1986)

- Löffler in c. 1934

Personal information
- Born: 29 December 1901 Meziříčko, Moravia, Austria-Hungary
- Died: 5 August 1986 (aged 84) Prague, Czechoslovakia

Gymnastics career
- Discipline: Men's artistic gymnastics
- Country represented: Czechoslovakia
Medal record
Men's gymnastics
Representing Czechoslovakia
Olympic Games
Silver medal – second place	1928 Amsterdam	Vault
Silver medal – second place	1928 Amsterdam	Team
Bronze medal – third place	1928 Amsterdam	Rings
World Championships
Gold medal – first place	1930 Luxembourg	Rings
Gold medal – first place	1930 Luxembourg	Team
Gold medal – first place	1938 Prague	Team
Silver medal – second place	1934 Budapest	Team
Silver medal – second place	1930 Luxembourg	Floor
Bronze medal – third place	1930 Luxembourg	All-Around
Bronze medal – third place	1934 Budapest	All-Around

Emanuel Löffler (29 December 1901 – 5 August 1986) was a Czech gymnast. He competed for Czechoslovakia in the 1928 Summer Olympics and in the 1936 Summer Olympics. Additionally, he won several individual and team medals throughout the 1930s at the World Championships.

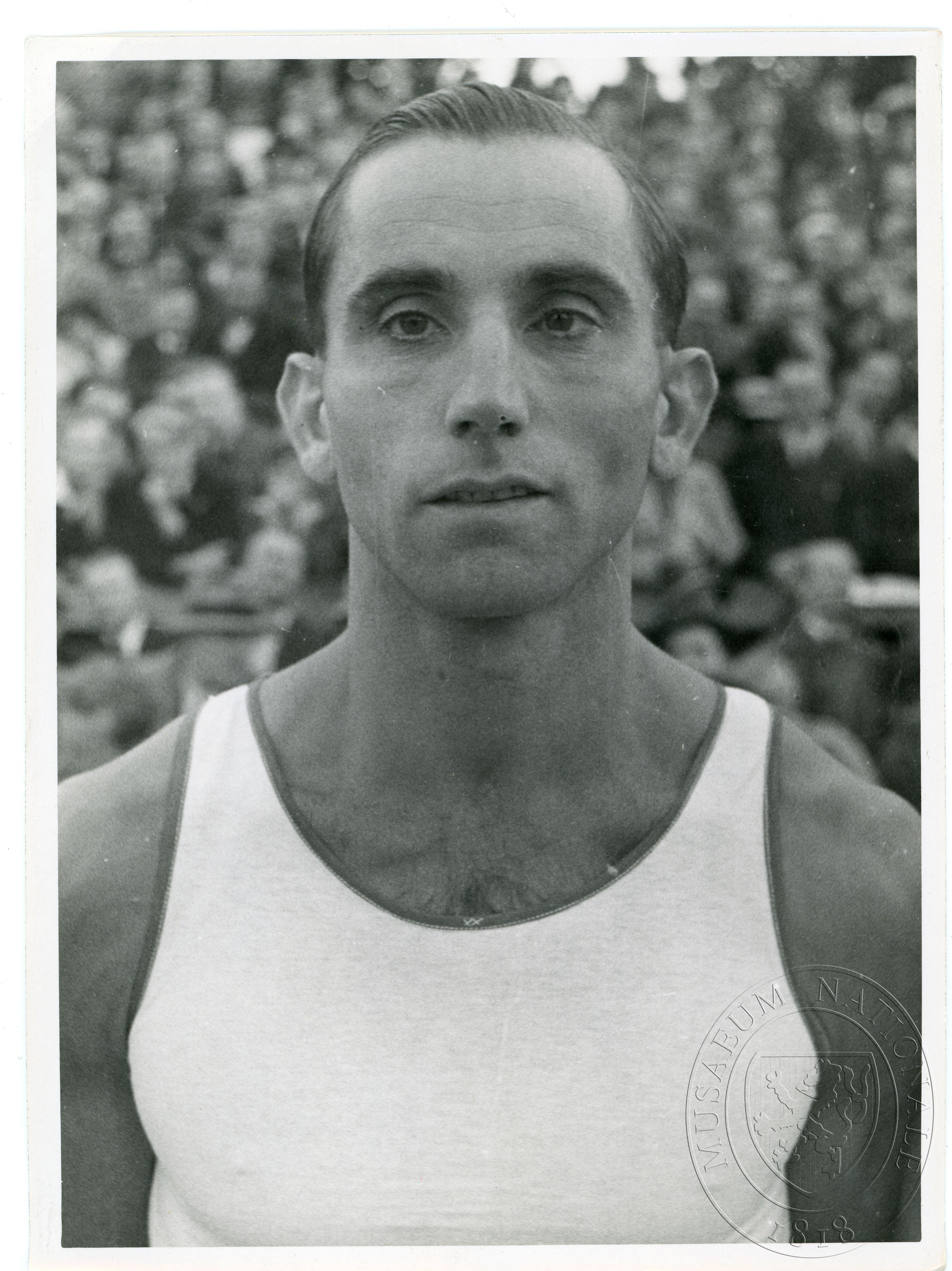
Löffler in 1936. Of the 6 Olympics and Worlds between 1928 and 1938 to which Czechoslovakia sent male gymnasts, Löffler competed at all but one of those – the 1931 World Championships. He was the bronze medalist in the all-around at both Worlds (1930 and 1934) immediately surrounding the 1931 one.

Löffler made his Olympic debut at the 1928 Amsterdam Olympics, doing very well in the men's individual all-around competition where he placed 10th in a competitive field of over 80 gymnasts. He secured the title of all-around champion of the 1930 Slavic Falconry Association Championships in Belgrade. On the final day of the men's all-around competition, on 24 June, his total of 192.70 points in the all-around competition put him above Josip Primožič and Jan Gajdoš, who, respectively, took 2nd place with 191.25 points and 3rd place with 187.50 points. Throughout the course of the competition, the top group of competitors went back and forth in the standings; it was Löffler's performance in the 100-meter hurdles event that clinched his victory over the rest of the competitive field. At the 1930 World Championships which were less than a month later, the all-around podium was the same 3 individuals, but in a different order, as Primožič became all-around champion, Gajdoš placed 2nd, and Löffler took 3rd (as well as the rings title and a 2nd place finish on floor, also helping his team to the team title).

A consistent mainstay of his Czechoslovak team from the late 1920s through the 1930s, Löffler competed at every Worlds/Olympics from 1928 to 1938 where there were Czechoslovak male gymnasts, except for the 1931 Worlds from which he was absent.

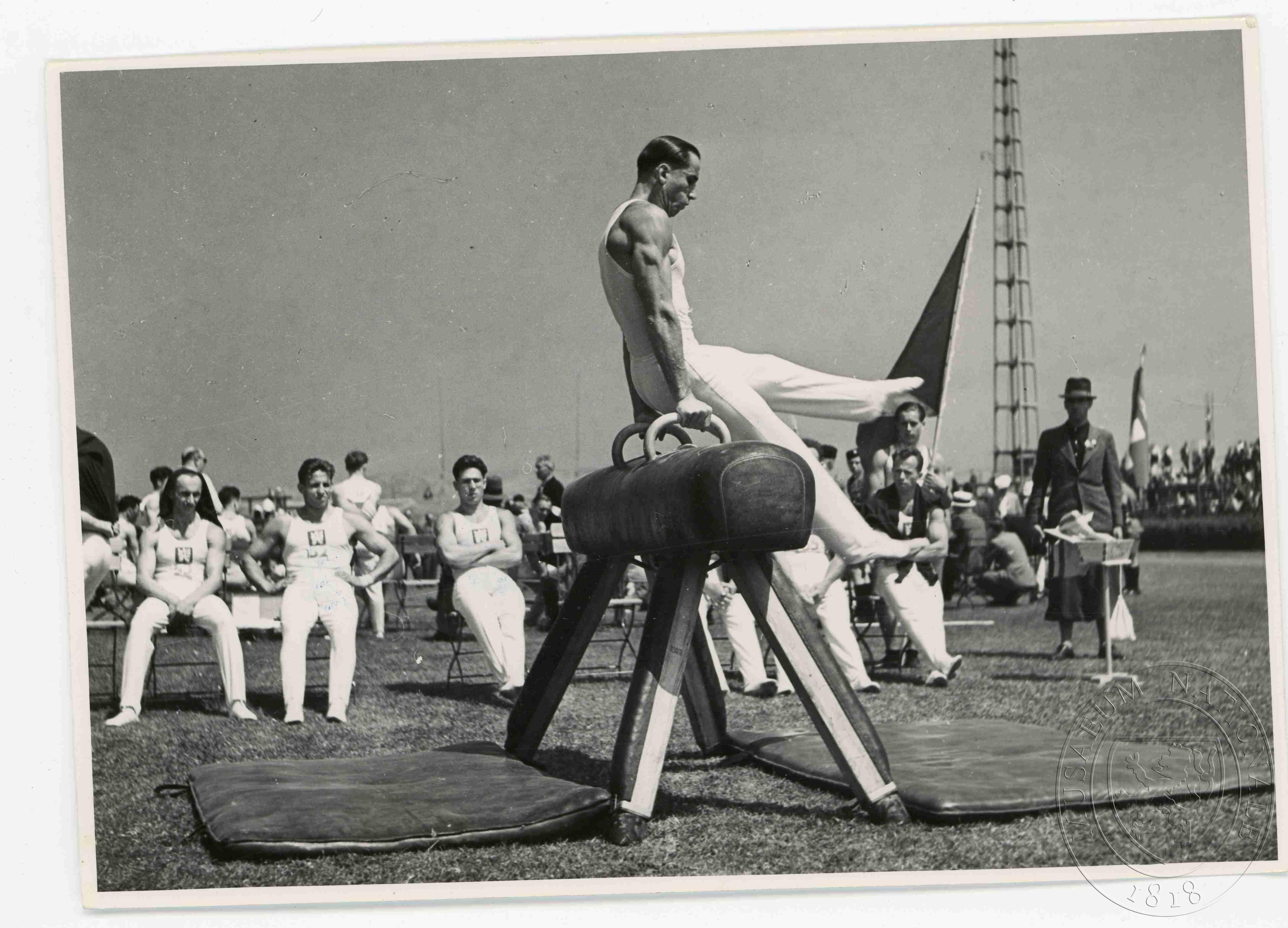
Löffler performing on Pommel Horse at the 1938 World Championships, with his Czechoslovak teammates observing, including 1938 World All-Around Champion Jan Gajdoš, seated 2nd from left, and 1931 World All-Around Champion Alois Hudec seated and appearing between Löffler’s feet.
