= Jan Karafiát =

Jan Karafiát may refer to:

- Jan Karafiát (author) (1846–1929), Czech clergyman and author
- Jan Karafiát (gymnast), Czech gymnast
