= Kenzō Shirai =

Japanese gymnast (born 1996)

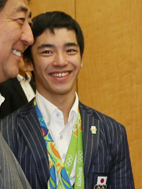
- Shirai at the Japanese Prime Minister's Official Residence in 2016
- Nicknames: Mr Twister; Twist Prince (Japanese)
- Born: August 24, 1996 (age 30) Yokohama, Kanagawa
- Height: 162 cm (5 ft 4 in)

Gymnastics career
- Discipline: Men's artistic gymnastics
- Country represented: Japan (2013–2021)
- College team: Nippon Sport Science University (Nittaidai)
- Club: Tsurumi Gymnastics Club
- Head coaches: Yoshiaki Hatakeda (club); Hisashi Mizutori (national)
- Former coaches: Masaki Shirai (father); Norimi Shirai (mother)
- Eponymous skills: See eponymous skills
- Retired: June 16, 2021
Medal record
Representing Japan
Olympic Games
Gold medal – first place	2016 Rio de Janeiro	Team
Bronze medal – third place	2016 Rio de Janeiro	Vault
World Championships
Gold medal – first place	2013 Antwerp	Floor exercise
Gold medal – first place	2015 Glasgow	Team
Gold medal – first place	2015 Glasgow	Floor exercise
Gold medal – first place	2017 Montreal	Floor exercise
Gold medal – first place	2017 Montreal	Vault
Silver medal – second place	2014 Nanning	Team
Silver medal – second place	2014 Nanning	Floor exercise
Silver medal – second place	2018 Doha	Floor exercise
Bronze medal – third place	2017 Montreal	All-around
Bronze medal – third place	2018 Doha	Team
Bronze medal – third place	2018 Doha	Vault
Asian Championships
Gold medal – first place	2012 Putian	Floor exercise
Gold medal – first place	2015 Hiroshima	Team
Gold medal – first place	2015 Hiroshima	Floor exercise
Silver medal – second place	2012 Putian	Team
Silver medal – second place	2015 Hiroshima	Vault

Kenzō Shirai (白井 健三, Shirai Kenzō; born August 24, 1996) is a Japanese retired artistic gymnast. He was a member of the gold medal winning teams at the 2016 Olympic Games and the 2015 World Championships. Individually he was the 2016 Olympic bronze medalist on vault, a three-time World Champion on floor exercise (2013, 2015, 2017), and the 2017 World Champion on vault.

== Early life ==
Shirai was born in Yokohama, Kanagawa. Like his older brothers, he started gymnastics with parents Masaki and Norimi, first coaches and home club owners. Shirai said, "For as long as I can remember, I was a gym rat." Instead of paying day care, parents took him to their work. Practicing a six-hour session 5–7 days per week, Shirai attended regular school, which was atypical for an elite athlete. After he graduated Kishine High School in March 2015, he was accepted to attend/represent new home club of Nittaidai on the southern Tokyo border where other Japanese gymnasts also trained, including mentor Kōhei Uchimura.

== Career ==
=== 2013 ===
Shirai, barely over 17 years of age, was the youngest male artistic gymnast participating at the 2013 World Championships in Antwerp. On floor exercise, he qualified in first with a score of 16.233, 0.633 points over Brazil's Diego Hypólito. During the event final, he scored 16.000 to win gold over the USA's Jake Dalton. In doing so, he became youngest ever World Champion on floor exercise in men's artistic gymnastics. On vault, Shirai qualified to the event final in first but ended up placing fourth.

At this competition, Shirai successfully competed three new skills, which were named after him in the Code of Points. On vault, he completed a triple-twisting Yurchenko while on floor exercise he completed a backward quadruple twisting layout and forward triple twisting layout.

=== 2014 ===
At the 2014 World Championships, Shirai helped Japan win silver as a team, only 0.1 point behind China. Individually he qualified for the floor exercise and vault finals. During the floor exercise final, Shirai stepped out of bounds, incurring a 0.1 penalty which ended up costing him the gold as he lost to Russian Denis Ablyazin by 0.017 points. On vault, Shirai finished fourth for the second year in a row.

=== 2015 ===
At the 2015 World Championships in Glasgow, Shirai helped Japan win team gold for first time since 1978. Shirai posted the top score on floor exercise of the whole meet, and it was also the only value above 16.000 points. In the individual event finals, Shirai qualified for both floor exercise and vault, winning gold on the former and ranking seventh on latter.

At the Toyota Cup in December, Shirai verified his fourth eponymous skill and third on floor exercise: a triple-twisting double layout.

=== 2016 ===
Shirai competed at the 2016 Olympic Games. At 19 years, 11 months and 15 days old, Shirai became Japan's youngest and only teen male gymnast in history to ever win Olympic gold after the Japanese men's squad won the team gold medal. In the vault final, Shirai successfully originated a new skill: a three and a half twisting yurchenko vault (an additional half twist from his original eponymous vault). He ended up winning Olympic bronze behind Ri Se-gwang and Denis Ablyazin. In the floor exercise final, Shirai finished fourth.

=== 2017 ===
In February, Shirai competed at the Melbourne World Cup, Shirai won gold on floor exercise, vault, and horizontal bar and won silver on parallel bars. Additionally, he verified his sixth eponymous skill and third on vault, a "full (1/1) on–double full off".

At the 2017 World Championships in Montreal, Shirai made the individual all-around, floor exercise, and vault finals, medalling in each. In the all-around, he won bronze with an 86.431, just 0.017 behind silver medal-winning Lin Chaopan. On floor exercise, Shirai defended his gold, earning a score 1.1 points ahead of second place finisher Artem Dolgopyat. On vault, Shirai won the title ahead of runner-up Igor Radivilov.

=== 2018 ===
In March 2018, Shirai competed at the 2018 American Cup. He ended up placing sixth due to a few errors and falls on horizontal bar and pommel horse. Shirai recovered by winning the Tokyo World Cup the following month.

In a series of domestic competitions held locally between April and August, Shirai won all-around silver medals at the All-Japan Championships and NHK Trophy, and won the All-Japan Student Championships. Shirai was also able to win an individual gold medal on floor exericse with silver medal on vault at the All-Japan Event Championships.

At the 2018 World Championships in Doha, Japan won team bronze. Shirai was unable to defend any of his 2017 titles; however he still won silver on floor exercise and bronze on vault.

=== 2019 ===
In early 2019, Shirai competed at the 2019 Tokyo World Cup. Like 2018, he was supposed to start his season off at the 2019 American Cup, but he withdrew in order to treat a left ankle injury, which was sustained about a week before he began traveling. Due to the injury, Shirai simplified certain skills in his routines for the competition in Tokyo. Shirai ultimately failed to defend his gold medal from 2018, but he did manage to win bronze with the combined total of 82.964, despite still recovering from injury.

On April 26–28, 2019, Shirai competed at the 2019 All-Japan Championships, where he placed 30th. Shirai also only managed one top-three score for any apparatus, and second highest for floor exercise (14.533) behind Kazuki Minami (14.633).

On May 18–19, 2019, Shirai competed at the 2019 NHK Trophy. Due to lingering injury issues with the left ankle, he was unable to perform as well at the competition when compared to most others that would also include his performance there last year. Shirai placed 23rd with a 243.794 combined score. He was unable to achieve a top three score on any of the apparatuses, not even on his signatures of floor exercise or vault.

On June 21–23, 2019, Shirai competed at the 2019 All-Japan Apparatus Championships, hoping he would do well enough to secure a spot on the Japanese men's national team and compete as part of the next world championships held in the autumn of 2019. He qualified for three individual event finals, which were floor exercise, vault, and horizontal bar, ranking second, fourth, and sixth respectively. In the finals, he proceeded to finish in third (14.900), fifth (14.433), and eighth (11.200) place respectively for each of these apparatuses.

In 2019, for the first time since Shirai's debut competition in 2013, he did not make the Japanese men's national team, and was excluded to compete at the 2019 World Championships.

On December 14–15, 2019, Shirai again competed at the local 2019 Toyota International Cup but he withdrew from all events at the end, citing ongoing ankle injuries.

=== 2020–2021 ===
On December 10–13, 2020, then postgraduate at Nittaidai, Shirai competed again at the 2020 All-Japan Championships, placing 18th in the all-around (167.196), and fourth on floor exercise (15.166).

Due to public health issues of the COVID-19 pandemic, the 2020 Summer Olympics in Tokyo were delayed by one year until July 23–August 8, 2021. In 2020, Shirai reluctantly began to consider retirement because of persistent injuries, but returned in early 2021 to compete at the 2021 All-Japan Championships, still trying to make it to the local Olympic Games. After not qualifying, he announced his immediate retirement from AG on June 16, 2021, also missing him the 2021 World Championships in the Japanese city of Kitakyushu.

== Competitive history ==
Competitive history of Kenzō Shirai
Year	Event	Team	AA	FX	PH	SR	VT	PB	HB
2012
2012	Asian Championships	2nd place, silver medalist(s)		1st place, gold medalist(s)			6		
2013
2013	World Championships	—N/a		1st place, gold medalist(s)			4		
2014
2014	World Championships	2nd place, silver medalist(s)		2nd place, silver medalist(s)			4		
2015	Cottbus World Challenge Cup			1st place, gold medalist(s)			1st place, gold medalist(s)	6	
2015	Asian Championships	1st place, gold medalist(s)		1st place, gold medalist(s)			2nd place, silver medalist(s)		
2015	World Championships	1st place, gold medalist(s)		1st place, gold medalist(s)			7		
2016	Baku World Challenge Cup			1st place, gold medalist(s)			1st place, gold medalist(s)	4	
2016	Olympic Games	1st place, gold medalist(s)		4			3rd place, bronze medalist(s)		
2017	Melbourne World Cup			1st place, gold medalist(s)			1st place, gold medalist(s)	2nd place, silver medalist(s)	1st place, gold medalist(s)
2017	World Championships	—N/a	3rd place, bronze medalist(s)	1st place, gold medalist(s)			1st place, gold medalist(s)		
2018	American Cup		6						
2018	Tokyo World Cup		1st place, gold medalist(s)						
2018	World Championships	3rd place, bronze medalist(s)	7	2nd place, silver medalist(s)			3rd place, bronze medalist(s)		
2019	Tokyo World Cup		3rd place, bronze medalist(s)						
2020	All-Japan Senior Championships		24						
2020	All-Japan Championships		18	4			7		
2021	NHK Trophy			1st place, gold medalist(s)					
2021	All-Japan Event Championships			2nd place, silver medalist(s)					7

== Eponymous skills ==
Shirai is officially credited with 6 original skill names. Current 2022–2024 quad's D-scores below held up since competing last in the FIG's earlier 2017–2021 CoP for MAG:

Apparatus	Name(s)	Description(s)	Difficulty	Verification	Competition Achieved
FX	Shirai or Shirai-Nguyen*	backward (bwd) quadruple (4/1)-twisting (back) layout (somersault), or quadruple twist (straight back) somersault backwards (bwds)	F (0.6)	Automatic	2013 World Championships
FX	Shirai 2	forward (fwd) or front triple (3/1)-twisting straight (somersault), or (forward or front layout) triple twist somersault forwards (fwds)	F (0.6)	Automatic	2013 World Championships
FX	Shirai 3	backward triple-twisting double (2/1) straight (back somersault), and aka (a) "triple (twist) double (back)" layout somersault backwards	H (0.8)	Petition^{1}	2015 Toyota International Cup
VT	Shirai or Shirai-Kim*	Round off back handspring (or Yurchenko entry) into (back layout) triple twist, or a "triple-twisting (straight back) Yurchenko" (abbreviated as "TTY")	5.6 (was 6.0)	Automatic	2013 World Championships
VT	Shirai 2	Round off back handspring or Yurchenko entry into (straight back) 3½ twist, or 3½-twisting (back layout) Yurchenko (abbreviated as 3.5Y)	6.0 (was 6.4)	Automatic	2016 Summer Olympic Games
VT	Shirai 3	Round off–full (1/1)-twisting back handspring or Scherbo entry into (back layout) double twist, and aka (a) "full (twist) on–(straight back) double full (twist) off"	5.4	Automatic	2017 Melbourne World Cup

*Such eponymous skills have taken official names of two originators, but evolving skill factors like one athlete's greater success shortened name for only that gymnast.
^{1}Except the Shirai 3 on FX that was verified via the FIG's petition process due to group of meet with, others getting automatic official naming after the originating meet.

== Miscellaneous ==
In October 2017, as the 2017 World Championships just finished up in Montreal, a social media video showed Shirai in highly competent delivery of the Mustafina on floor, or triple Y-turn, which has an E (0.5) D-score in the 2017–2021 CoP for WAG—officially named after Russian gymnast Aliya Mustafina. Shirai was then also observed completing additional skills on even more WAG apparatuses, such as the execution of a partial routine on uneven bars, at least to comparable levels. In December 2018, another clip was posted and compared of Shirai reproducing compatriot Mai Murakami's entire competition floor routine to music with her hardest skills—many not assessed for scoring of MAG—such as the Gomez on floor, or quadruple turn with free leg below horizontal (originated by Spain's Elena Gómez at the 2002 World Championships in Debrecen), which was another skill given FIG's top D-score of E (0.5) for all WAG dance elements in 2017–2021 quad. With Shirai's knowledge, there had been another compilation video then shared by the fans showing Shirai training some skills/combos that had potential to be part of future arsenal to perform possible advanced original floor and vault skills—could include "RO–BH–4½ twist punch ½ or full" on floor, and "½ on–3½ off" on vault too.
