= Gymnastics at the 2016 Summer Olympics – Men's vault =

Olympic gymnastics event

Men's vault at the Games of the XXXI Olympiad
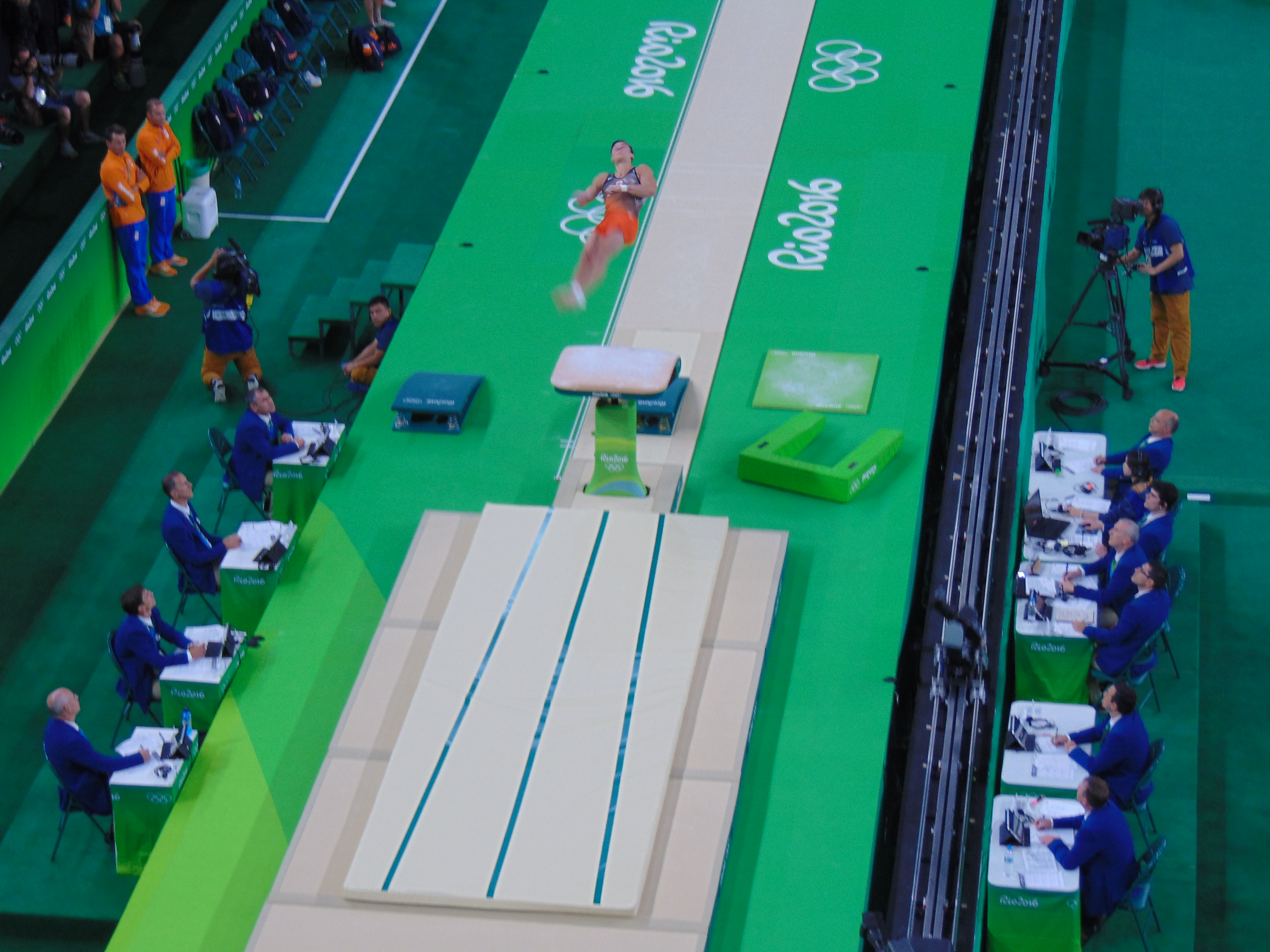
- A qualifying round vault
- Venue: HSBC Arena
- Dates: 6 August (qualifying); 15 August (final)
- Competitors: 17 from 14 nations
- Winning score: 15.691

Medalists
1st place, gold medalist(s)		Ri Se-gwang; North Korea
2nd place, silver medalist(s)		Denis Ablyazin; Russia
3rd place, bronze medalist(s)		Kenzō Shirai; Japan

The men's vault competition at the 2016 Summer Olympics in Rio de Janeiro was held at the HSBC Arena on 15 August 2016. There were 17 competitors from 14 nations. The event was won by Ri Se-gwang of North Korea, the nation's first medal in the men's vault. Denis Ablyazin repeated as silver medalist, the eighth man to win multiple medals in the event. Kenzō Shirai earned Japan's first medal in the men's vault since 1984 with his bronze.

The medals were presented by Chang Ung, IOC Member, People's Republic of Korea, and Ali Al-Hitmi, FIG Executive Committee Member.

== Background ==
This was the 24th appearance of the event, which is one of the five apparatus events held every time there were apparatus events at the Summer Olympics (no apparatus events were held in 1900, 1908, 1912, or 1920). Three of the eight finalists from 2012 returned—silver medalist Denis Ablyazin of Russia, bronze medalist Igor Radivilov of Ukraine, and fourth-place finisher Tomás González of Chile. Two other 2012 finalists, fifth-place finisher Samuel Mikulak of the United States and eighth-place finisher Kristian Thomas of Great Britain, competed in gymnastics in Rio de Janeiro but did not perform the necessary two vaults in the qualifying round to compete in the vault. Marian Drăgulescu of Romania, the 2004 bronze medalist and 2008 fourth-place finisher, also returned. The favorite was Ri Se-gwang of North Korea, who had won the last two world championships (2014 and 2015).

Lithuania made its debut in the men's vault. The United States made its 21st appearance, most of any nation.

== Qualification ==
Qualification for the men's artistic gymnastics in 2008 was based primarily on the 2015 World Artistic Gymnastics Championships. The top 8 teams at the world championships could send a full team of 5 gymnasts to the Olympics. The next 8 teams (#9 through #16) competed in the 2012 Gymnastics Olympic Test Event, with the top 4 of those teams also qualifying a team of 5 gymnasts for the Olympics. The individual apparatus medalists from the World Championships also qualified, if their nation had not already qualified a team. There were places reserved for host country and continental representation, and the Tripartite Commission made an invitation. The quota of 98 gymnasts was then filled through the individual all-around rankings at the Test Event, with each nation able to qualify only one gymnast in that manner (though this one gymnast could be added to the world championship apparatus medalists—for example, Romania qualified Marian Drăgulescu as silver medalist in vault and Andrei Muntean through Test Event).

== Competition format ==
The top 8 qualifiers in the qualification phase (limit two per NOC) advanced to the apparatus final. On vault, only gymnasts who performed two skills on vault were considered for the final. The average score of the two skills was counted. The finalists again performed two vaults. Qualification scores were then ignored with only final round scores (average of the two skills) counting.

== Schedule ==
All times are Brasília Time (UTC-03:00)

Date	Time	Round
Wednesday, 10 August 2016		Qualifying
Friday, 15 August 2016	14:54	Final

== Results ==
=== Qualifying ===
The gymnasts who ranked top eight qualified for final round. In case of there were more than two gymnasts in same NOC, the last ranked among them would not qualify to final round. The next best ranked gymnast would qualify instead. Although four gymnasts (Shirai, Radivilov, Drăgulescu and Nagornyy) posted third highest average score (15.283), tiebreak procedures were activated and successfully separated each athlete by rank. Shirai ranked ahead in third while Nagornyy ranked sixth overall due to highest (15.466) and lowest (15.300) single vault score. Because Drăgulescu and Radivilov had identical scores on both vaults, their ranks were then separated by identifying the single top E-score among their already-completed vaults, resulting in Radivilov ranking ahead in fourth and Drăgulescu in fifth overall (9.433 vs 9.333).

Rank	Gymnast	Nation	Vault 1				Vault 2				Total	Notes
Rank	Gymnast	Nation	D Score	E Score	Pen.	Vault Score	D Score	E Score	Pen.	Vault Score	Total	Notes
1	Ri Se-gwang	North Korea	6.400	9.000	−0.1	15.300	6.400	9.166		15.566	15.433	Q
2	Denis Ablyazin	Russia	6.400	9.100	−0.1	15.400	6.200	9.233		15.433	15.416	Q
3	Kenzō Shirai	Japan	6.000	9.466		15.466	5.600	9.500		15.100	15.283	Q
4	Igor Radivilov	Ukraine	6.000	9.433		15.433	6.000	9.233	−0.1	15.133	15.283	Q
5	Marian Drăgulescu	Romania	6.000	9.133		15.133	6.200	9.333	−0.1	15.433	15.283	Q
6	Nikita Nagornyy	Russia	6.000	9.266		15.266	6.000	9.300		15.300	15.283	Q
7	Oleg Verniaiev	Ukraine	6.000	9.066		15.066	6.000	9.300		15.300	15.183	Q
8	Tomás González	Chile	6.000	9.233		15.233	5.600	9.466		15.066	15.149	Q
9	Sérgio Sasaki Junior	Brazil	6.000	9.266		15.266	6.000	9.066	−0.3	14.766	15.016	R
10	Jacob Dalton	United States	6.000	9.133		15.133	6.000	8.433	−0.3	14.133	14.633	R
11	Artur Davtyan	Armenia	6.000	9.400	−0.1	15.300	6.000	8.133	−0.3	13.833	14.566	R
12	Benjamin Gischard	Switzerland	5.200	9.100		14.300	5.600	9.133		14.733	14.516	
13	Andrei Muntean	Romania	5.600	9.033		14.633	5.200	9.133		14.333	14.483	
14	Scott Morgan	Canada	5.600	9.000		14.600	5.600	8.841	−0.1	14.341	14.470	
15	Robert Tvorogal	Lithuania	5.200	8.933		14.133	5.600	8.266	−0.3	13.566	13.849	
16	Mikhail Koudinov	New Zealand	5.200	8.933		14.133	4.400	9.066		13.466	13.799	
17	Kim Han-sol	South Korea	5.200	7.433		12.633	6.000	8.966	−0.1	14.866	13.749	

=== Final ===
The tiebreak procedure was used due to final scores tying for third highest. Kenzō Shirai of Japan won the bronze medal with Marian Drăgulescu of Romania placing fourth due to Shirai's top vault score being higher than Drăgulescu's (15.833 versus 15.633), and with identical scores in total, and separate vaults as well as both E- and D-scores, Nikita Nagornyy of Russia and Oleg Verniaiev of Ukraine ended the competition in a rare tie for fifth place since the tiebreak procedure would be ineffective in such instances. Ties at the Olympics are far less common since 2000 (thanks to new tie-breaking rules), but remain possible if the total, E- and then D-scores of both vaults all finished with identical values. Shirai and Igor Radivilov of Ukraine also successfully originated two new skills in the final—the Shirai 2, 3½-twisting Yurchenko, and Radivilov, handspring triple front somersault, even though the latter did have a crash landing. Despite that, the reason justifying the naming credit was because Radivilov was able to perform skill, landing feet first, which the rules had to count it as a valid vault, and thus the skill including its high D-score had to also be accepted into the Code of Points. The Shirai 2 is now 1 of 5 vaults with the top D-score of 6.0 in the 2017–2020 Code of Points, but even with the highest assigned D-score of 7.0, the Radivilov has since been banned after Rio by the FIG in competitions due to the determined high risk of injury factor when attempting and training the skill.

Rank	Gymnast	Nation	Vault 1				Vault 2				Total
Rank	Gymnast	Nation	D Score	E Score	Pen.	Vault Score	D Score	E Score	Pen.	Vault Score	Total
Gold medal	Ri Se-gwang	North Korea	6.400	9.216		15.616	6.400	9.366		15.766	15.691
Silver medal	Denis Ablyazin	Russia	6.400	9.200		15.600	6.200	9.233		15.433	15.516
Bronze medal	Kenzō Shirai	Japan	6.400	9.433		15.833	5.600	9.466		15.066	15.449
4	Marian Drăgulescu	Romania	6.000	9.266		15.266	6.200	9.433		15.633	15.449
5	Nikita Nagornyy	Russia	6.000	9.233		15.233	6.000	9.400		15.400	15.316
5	Oleg Verniaiev	Ukraine	6.000	9.400		15.400	6.000	9.233		15.233	15.316
7	Tomás González	Chile	6.000	9.375		15.375	5.600	9.300		14.900	15.137
8	Igor Radivilov	Ukraine	7.000	7.933		14.933	6.000	9.133		15.133	15.033
