= 1926 World Artistic Gymnastics Championships =

- Location: Lyon, France

The 8th Artistic Gymnastics World Championships were held in Lyon, in conjunction with that year's French Federal Festival, on May 22–23, 1926.

== Medal table ==
Rank	Nation	Gold	Silver	Bronze	Total
1	Czechoslovakia (TCH)	3	4	4	11
2	Yugoslavia	3	2	1	6
3	France (FRA)	0	0	1	1
Totals (3 entries)		6	6	6	18

== Team competition ==
Rank	Nation	Prelim. Exercises	Parallel bars	Horizontal bar	Pommel horse	Rings (gymnastics)	Gymnastics Events Totals	High Jump	Shot Put	Rope climb	100 meters	50 meter swim	Athletics Events Totals	Behavior	Punctuality	Team Grand Totals
1st place, gold medalist(s)	Czechoslovakia	185.91	170.342	178.191	181.594	180.86	896.897	61.25	62.1	55	57.5	38.05	273.9	8	20	1159.96
2nd place, silver medalist(s)	Yugoslavia	191.69	172.827	181.75	164.65	185.45	896.367	51.75	61.5	36.5	48.75	40.5	239	8	20	1152.02
3rd place, bronze medalist(s)	France	186.03	171.95	178.25	158.5	180.6	875.33	50.5	43.7	52.5	68	24.2	238.9	8	20	1020.77
4	Luxembourg	183.07	135.79	146.819	118.67	155.793	740.142	43.75	44.8	19	46.75	9.75	164.05	8	20	932.192
5	Belgium	169.94	143.46	128.549	127.496	143	712.445	37.5	14.9	15.8	40	28.35	136.55	8	20	876.995
6	Netherlands	157.92	132.989	95.21	119.995	119.593	625.707	42.5	33.9	10	50	30.9	167.3	7.5	20	820.507

== Individual Standings ==
Rank	Nation	Gymnast	Gymnastics Events						Athletics Events							Individual Grand Totals
Rank	Nation	Gymnast	Horizontal bar	Parallel bars	Rings (gymnastics)	Pommel horse	Gymnastics Events Totals	Gymnastics Events Totals Rank	Shot Put	High Jump	Rope climb	100 meter	50 meter swim	Athletics Events Totals	Athletics Events Totals Rank	Individual Grand Totals
1st place, gold medalist(s)	Yugoslavia	Peter Sumi	30.6	27.9	31.1	29.35	118.95	7	9.3	8.75	12.5	9.25	9.8	49.6	3	168.55
2nd place, silver medalist(s)	Czechoslovakia	Josef Effenberger	29.149	26.697	29.24	29.45	114.536	17	12	11.25	9.5	9.5	9.5	51.75	1	166.288
3rd place, bronze medalist(s)	Czechoslovakia	Ladislav Vácha	31.348	31.248	31.75	30.8	125.146	1	11.8	10	9.5	9.5	0	40.8	12	165.945
4	Czechoslovakia	Jan Karafiát	29.598	28.428	29.34	30.898	118.264	8	8.9	7.5	11.5	9.25	9.2	46.35	7	164.614
5	Czechoslovakia	František Pecháček	30.098	28.149	28.25	30.599	117.096	12	14.1	11.25	4	9.75	7.8	46.9	5	163.996
6	France	Ernest Heeb	29.75	29.4	31.5	25.6	116.25	15	9.8	8.75	9.5	12	7.4	47.45	4	163.7
7	France	Armand Solbach	30.4	29.75	31.2	27.85	119.2	5	10.5	9.25	8.5	12	3.65	43.9	9	163.1
8	Czechoslovakia	Bedřich Šupčík	29.299	28.199	31.53	30.549	119.577	4	7.2	10	11.5	9.75	4.25	42.7	11	162.277
9	Czechoslovakia	Ladislav Riesner	28.699	27.298	30.75	29.298	116.045	16	8.1	11.25	9	9.75	7.3	45.4	8	161.455
10	Yugoslavia	Stane Derganc	29.1	28.484	30.55	29.5	117.634	9	11.9	6.25	4	7.5	10.3	39.95	14	157.584
11	Yugoslavia	Josip Primožič	31.55	29.299	31.15	27	118.999	6	9.7	10	7	5.25	5.6	37.55	18	156.549
12	France	François Gangloff	29.65	28.65	29.4	28.9	116.6	14	8.8	7.5	6.5	9.75	5.8	38.35	16	154.95
13	Yugoslavia	Leon Štukelj	31.6	30.45	31.85	27.65	121.55	2	7.2	8.75	3.5	8.5	5.3	33.25	22	154.8
14	Yugoslavia	Srečko Sršen	29.95	29.195	31.2	23.65	113.995	19	12.6	10.5	8	9.25	0	40.35	13	154.345
15	Czechoslovakia	Václav Veselý	29.248	28.349	30.08	29.549	117.226	11	8.4	8.75	4	8.5	6.9	36.55	19	153.776
16	France	Alfred Straus	30.4	29.9	29.5	24.35	114.15	18	8.9	7.5	10	13	0	39.4	15	153.55
17	Yugoslavia	Artur Gorisse	28.15	27.1	28.4	22.5	106.15	22	8.3	8.75	12.5	12	5.2	46.75	6	152.9
18	Yugoslavia	Stane Vidmar	28.95	27.499	29.6	27.5	113.549	20	10.8	7.5	1.5	9	9.5	38.3	17	151.849
19	France	Jean Gounot	29.9	27.15	30.6	29.3	116.95	13	7.4	8.75	5.5	9.25	2.15	33.05	23	150
20	Czechoslovakia	Jan Gajdoš	29.149	30.598	30.54	30.849	121.136	3	5.4	12.5	0	9.75	-	27.65	32	148.786
21	Yugoslavia	Oton Zupac	29.3	24.894	25.3	18.75	98.244	26	12.5	10	12	9	6.8	50.3	2	148.544
22	Yugoslavia	Miha Osvald	29.975	26.25	31.5	24.45	112.175	21	7.8	3.75	8	9.25	5.3	34.1	20	146.275
23	France	Artur Gavnier	31.15	30.25	30.25	25.95	117.6	10	6.2	6.25	3	11	1.9	28.35	30	145.95
24	France	Corentin Le Friant	26.475	23.65	23.95	25.85	99.925	23	8.6	10	7.5	10	7.3	43.4	10	143.32
25	Luxembourg	Mathias Logelin	27.574	22.948	25.698	19.995	96.215	29	7.6	7.5	5	9.5	-	29.6	28	125.815
26	Belgium	Remy Reynaert	24.873	25.34	23.19	24.8	98.203	27	4.5	7.5	0	8	6.2	26.2	36	124.403
27	Luxembourg	Francois Zuang	27.849	24.098	25.85	21.745	99.542	24	7.2	6.25	1.5	5.25	4.2	24.4	41	123.942
28	Luxembourg	Charles Quaino	26.299	24.348	26.998	18.44	96.085	30	5.1	7.5	6	7.5	-	26.1	37	122.185
29	Luxembourg	Nicolas Roeser	25.149	21.198	28.898	19.79	95.035	31	8.1	10	0	7.5	1.4	27	34	122.035
30	Belgium	Elie Melleman	25.744	26.24	23.19	21.749	96.923	28	3.3	7.5	1.5	9.25	3.5	25.05	39	121.973
31	Netherlands	Emanuel Fortuin	18.55	22.349	23.45	22.149	86.498	33	7.2	8.75	0	9.75	8.1	33.8	21	120.298
32	Luxembourg	Eduard Grethen	18.423	23.249	23.15	23.245	88.067	32	7.1	6.25	4	9.5	4.15	31	25	119.067
33	Belgium	Frans Gibens	22.525	25.88	26.43	23.5	98.355	25	1.7	5	0.3	6	2.85	15.85	45	114.185
34	Netherlands	Albert Stuiwenberg	19.15	24.798	18.449	19.198	81.595	36	10	5	0	5.25	7.5	27.75	31	110.145
35	Belgium	Luc. Van de Venne	16.474	23.49	24.69	18.5	83.154	35	1.4	7.5	0	6.75	10.6	26.25	35	109.409
36	Belgium	Jos. Van den Bogaert	20.95	19.03	26.69	19.199	85.869	34	0	3.75	5.5	8	2.95	20.2	43	107.569
37	Belgium	Charles Van den Bogaert	17.973	21.98	18.81	19.748	78.511	38	4	6.25	8.5	8	2.25	29	29	107.511
38	Netherlands	Hugo Licher	16.9	20.348	17.049	20.15	74.446	44	4.7	7.5	7	10	3.75	32.95	24	107.396
39	Netherlands	Johannes Hiboer	17.99	22.398	20.049	19.25	79.687	37	4.9	7.5	3	9	3.05	27.45	33	107.137
40	Luxembourg	Albert Neumann	21.525	19.949	21.599	15.433	78.506	39	9.7	6.25	2.5	7.5	-	25.95	38	104.456
41	Netherlands	Pieter Jongeneel	10.37	22.698	17.648	18.599	69.315	46	5.3	7.5	0	8.5	8.5	29.8	27	99.115
42	Luxembourg	Mathias Genen	13.7	20.45	19.599	14.085	67.834	48	10.3	7.5	0	8.5	4	30.3	26	98.134
43	Luxembourg	Albert Houss	18.048	21.399	24.498	12.885	76.83	40	2.6	5	3.5	9.25	0	20.35	42	97.18
44	Belgium	Leon Van Antwerpen	18.749	18.54	18.02	13.748	69.057	47	1.1	5	0	9.25	9.1	24.45	40	93.507
45	Netherlands	Israel Winschenk	12.25	20.398	22.949	20.649	76.246	42	1.8	6.25	0	7.5	0	15.55	46	91.796
46	Netherlands	Theodoras Brouwer	18.06	23.048	17.298	17.799	76.205	43	2.6	5.75	0	6.75	0	15.1	46	91.305
47	Netherlands	Johannaes Verbek	15.7	20.249	17.798	19.55	73.297	45	4.7	6.25	0	6.75	0	17.7	44	90.977
48	Belgium	G. Van den Bogaert	17.799	20.64	20.79	17.148	76.377	41	1.4	3.75	0	6	3.15	14.3	48	90.677

=== Pommel horse ===
Rank	Nationality	Athlete	Total
1	Czechoslovakia	Jan Karafiat	-
2	Czechoslovakia	Jan Gajdos	-
3	Czechoslovakia	Ladislav Vácha	-

=== Rings ===
Rank	Nationality	Athlete	Total
1	Yugoslavia	Leon Štukelj	-
2	Czechoslovakia	Ladislav Vácha	-
3	Czechoslovakia	Bedřich Šupčík	-

=== Parallel bars ===
Rank	Nationality	Athlete	Total
1	Czechoslovakia	Ladislav Vácha	-
2	Czechoslovakia	Jan Gajdos	-
3	Yugoslavia	Leon Štukelj	-

=== Horizontal bar ===
Rank	Nationality	Athlete	Total
1	Yugoslavia	Leon Štukelj	-
2	Yugoslavia	Josip Primožič	-
3	Czechoslovakia	Ladislav Vácha	-
