= Ladislav Vácha =

Czech gymnast

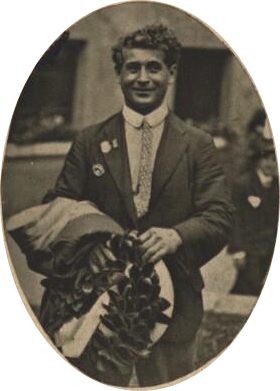
- Born: 21 March 1899 Brno, Moravia, Austria-Hungary
- Died: 28 June 1943 (aged 44) Zlín, Protectorate of Bohemia and Moravia

Gymnastics career
- Discipline: Men's artistic gymnastics
- Country represented: Czechoslovakia
Medal record
Olympic Games
Gold medal – first place	1928 Amsterdam	Parallel bars
Silver medal – second place	1928 Amsterdam	Rings
Silver medal – second place	1928 Amsterdam	Team
Bronze medal – third place	1924 Paris	Rope climbing
Bronze medal – third place	1924 Paris	Rings
World Championships
Gold medal – first place	1926 Lyon	Team
Gold medal – first place	1926 Lyon	Parallel Bars
Silver medal – second place	1926 Lyon	Rings
Bronze medal – third place	1926 Lyon	All-Around
Bronze medal – third place	1926 Lyon	Horizontal Bar
Bronze medal – third place	1926 Lyon	Pommel Horse
Bronze medal – third place	1930 Luxembourg	Parallel Bars

Ladislav Vácha (21 March 1899 in Brno – 28 June 1943) was a gymnast and Olympic champion competing for Czechoslovakia.

He competed at the 1924 Summer Olympics in Paris, where he received a bronze medal in rope climbing and rings. He received a gold medal in parallel bars, and silver medals in rings and team combined exercises at the 1928 Summer Olympics in Amsterdam.

He died during World War II shortly after being interrogated by Gestapo for his resistance activities.
