= Alfred Krauss (gymnast) =

French gymnast

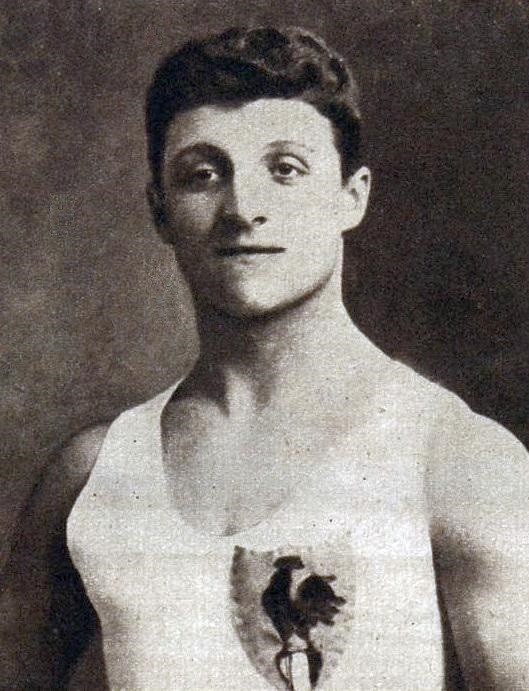
- Alfred Krauss in 1928

Personal information
- Born: 2 February 1908 Ostheim, France
- Died: 11 June 1957 (aged 49) Belfort, France

Gymnastics career
- Discipline: Men's artistic gymnastics
- Country represented: France
Medal record
Representing France
World Championships
| Silver medal – second place | 1930 Luxembourg | Team |
| Silver medal – second place | 1930 Luxembourg | Parallel bars |
| Bronze medal – third place | 1930 Luxembourg | Floor exercise |

Alfred Krauss (2 February 1908 – 11 June 1957) was a French gymnast. He competed in four events at the 1928 Summer Olympics.
