= 1930 World Artistic Gymnastics Championships =

Gymnastics competition

- Location: Luxembourg, Luxembourg

The 9th Artistic Gymnastics World Championships were held in Luxembourg on 12–14 July 1930.

Of special note is that a Yugoslavian Olympic medallist from 1928, Anton Malej, died one day after the conclusion of these games resulting from an injury, on the Rings apparatus, incurred during the games.

== Men's team all around ==
Rank	Nation	C	O	Totals	C	O	Totals	C	O	Totals	C	O	Totals	C	O	Totals	Behavior	Punctuality	Team Grand Totals
1st place, gold medalist(s)	Czechoslovakia	87.05	86.95	174	86.8	85.05	171.85	83.4	89.55	172.95	83.85	83	166.85	90.95	90.8	181.75	9.9	20	897.3
2nd place, silver medalist(s)	France	88.9	87.3	176.2	85.9	84.15	170.05	76.3	86.7	163	82.55	80.8	163.35	85.45	84	169.45	9.7	20	871.75
3rd place, bronze medalist(s)	Yugoslavia	84.15	85	169.15	82.3	80.3	162.6	78.3	76.95	155.25	87.2	86.45	173.65	76	83.1	159.1	10	20	849.75
4	Hungary	82.35	79.2	161.55	77.65	72.95	150.6	88.5	81.6	170.1	51.45	58.3	109.75	82.3	77.45	159.75	9	20	780.75
5	Luxembourg	84.65	80.45	165.1	74.3	70.55	144.85	81.2	75.75	156.95	52.6	60.3	112.9	67.1	78.35	145.45	9.6	20	754.85
6	Belgium	85.1	82	167.1	71.95	73.55	145.5	65.1	55.5	120.6	66.1	69.6	135.7	62.6	65.65	128.25	9.5	20	726.65

== Men's individual all around ==
Rank	Nation	Gymnast	C	O	Totals	C	O	Totals	C	O	Totals	C	O	Totals	C	O	Totals	Compulsories Totals	Compulsories Totals Rank	Optionals Totals	Optionals Totals Rank	Individual Grand Totals
1st place, gold medalist(s)	Yugoslavia	Josip Primožič	15.3	15.05	30.35	15.55	14.35	29.9	15.4	15.75	31.15	14.8	14.85	29.65	16	15.4	31.4	77.05	1	75.4	2	152.45
2nd place, silver medalist(s)	Czechoslovakia	Jan Gajdoš	14.95	14.9	29.85	15.25	15.25	30.5	14.45	14.8	29.25	15.2	15.25	30.45	15.8	14.7	30.5	75.65	2	74.9	3	150.55
3rd place, bronze medalist(s)	Czechoslovakia	Emanuel Löffler	15.05	15.1	30.15	15.1	15.1	30.2	14.95	13.75	28.7	16	16	32	13.75	13.85	27.6	74.85	3	73.8	5	148.65
4	France	Armand Solbach	14.95	15.05	30	14.8	15.55	30.35	15.1	14.2	29.3	14.5	14.4	28.9	14.1	14.7	28.8	73.45	5	73.9	4	147.35
5	Czechoslovakia	Ladislav Vácha	14.6	14.5	29.1	11.95	15.1	27.05	14.55	15.35	29.9	14.80	15.6	30.40	14.3	15	29.3	70.38	12	75.55	1	145.75
6	Luxembourg	Mathias Logelin	14.75	13.95	28.7	15.55	14.8	30.35	14.2	13.5	27.7	14.9	14.65	29.55	14.45	14.95	29.4	73.85	4	71.85	10	145.7
7	France	Georges Leroux	14.7	14.95	29.65	15.1	14.65	29.75	14.7	14.8	29.5	13.75	13.75	27.5	14.95	14.1	29.05	73.2	6	72.25	8	145.45
8	Czechoslovakia	Bedřich Šupčík	14.25	14.2	28.45	14.35	14.65	29	14.45	13.75	28.2	15.25	15.45	30.7	14.4	14.4	28.8	72.7	7	72.45	7	145.15
9	Hungary	István Pelle	14.1	14.75	28.85	16	16	32	12.6	13.3	25.9	15.05	15.25	30.3	13.3	12.85	26.15	71.05	10	72.15	9	143.2
10	France	Marcel Itten	14.65	14.5	29.15	14.5	14.5	29	15.4	13.9	29.3	14.8	13.85	28.65	13	11.65	24.65	72.35	8	68.4	16	140.75
11 (tie)	Yugoslavia	Peter Šumi	13.85	13.8	27.65	13.3	13.45	26.75	14.2	12.4	26.6	13.95	15	28.95	15.7	14.9	30.6	71	11	69.55	12	140.55
11 (tie)	Hungary	Nikolaus Péter	14.4	13.4	27.8	15.7	16	31.7	13.95	13.9	27.85	15.3	13.1	28.4	12.8	12	24.8	72.15	9	68.4	16	140.55
13	Czechoslovakia	Jindrich Tintěra	13.6	13.7	27.3	14.35	14.8	29.15	14.4	13.9	28.3	14.9	14.25	29.15	12.45	12.35	24.8	69.7	13	69	13	138.7
14	Czechoslovakia	Josef Effenberger	14.6	14.55	29.15	12.4	14.65	27.05	14	13.5	27.5	14.8	14.25	29.05	13.15	12.7	25.85	68.95	16	69.65	11	138.6
15	France	Maurice Rousseau	14.45	13.85	28.3	11.5	13.6	25.1	14.25	13.2	27.45	14.5	13	27.5	14.6	14.55	29.15	69.3	14	68.2	18	137.5
16	France	Edvard Antosiewicz	14	14.8	28.8	11.5	12.85	24.35	13.8	14.7	28.5	14.5	12.1	26.6	14.05	14.35	28.4	67.85	18	68.8	14	136.65
17	France	Alfred Kraus	15.15	14.95	30.1	5.3	14.95	20.25	15	15	30	14.7	14.8	29.5	12.6	13.7	26.3	62.75	24	73.4	6	136.15
18	Czechoslovakia	Jul Rybak	14.95	14.4	29.35	14.2	13.45	27.65	12.8	14.15	26.95	13.8	11.9	25.7	13.55	12.45	26	69.3	14	66.35	20	135.65
19	France	Jean Gounot	15	14	29	15.1	13.45	28.55	11.45	13.05	24.5	13.2	14.2	27.4	13.3	12.1	25.4	68.05	17	66.8	19	134.85
20	Yugoslavia	Rafael Ban	13.85	13.9	27.75	11.65	11.8	23.45	12.65	14	26.65	12.5	13.75	26.25	14.15	15.05	29.2	64.8	22	68.5	15	133.3
21	Yugoslavia	Stanislav Žilič	13.85	14	27.85	13.9	11.8	25.7	13.75	11.4	25.155	12.5	14.15	26.65	12.95	13.25	26.2	66.95	19	64.6	23	131.55
22	Belgium	Rémy Reynaert	14.15	14.6	28.75	13	13.3	26.3	11.5	13	24.5	9	11.5	20.5	13.25	13.85	27.1	60.9	29	66.25	21	127.15
23	Luxembourg	Jean Kugeler	14.2	13.75	27.95	14.8	13.45	28.25	14.4	12.3	26.7	13.75	13.95	27.7	7.75	7.65	15.4	64.9	21	61.1	25	126
24	Luxembourg	Francois Zuang	13.8	13.15	26.95	13.75	13	26.75	12.5	13.5	26	11.45	13	24.45	10.3	10.85	21.15	61.8	26	63.5	24	125.3
25	Yugoslavia	Boris Gregorka	13.3	13.45	26.75	12.4	12.7	25.1	12.5	12.05	24.55	7.75	13.25	21	14.35	13.5	27.85	60.3	30	64.95	22	125.25
26	Belgium	Frans Gibens	14.8	13.8	28.6	10.75	10.75	21.5	13.4	13	26.4	12.85	9.5	22.35	12.2	10.75	22.95	64	23	57.8	29	121.8
27	Hungary	Rezső Kende	13.7	13.2	26.9	15.7	14.2	29.9	13.25	10.75	24	14.9	13.95	28.85	4	7.05	11.05	61.55	28	59.15	26	120.7
28	Hungary	Péter Boros	12.25	11.85	24.1	13.75	12.25	26	12.2	10.8	23	13.65	11	24.65	13.35	7.3	20.65	65.2	20	53.2	37	118.4
29	Belgium	A. Defer	13.3	13.05	26.35	12.25	8.8	21.05	13.2	11.9	25.1	11.4	11.6	23	11.8	10.95	22.75	61.95	25	56.3	32	118.25
30	Hungary	Josef Hegedűs	14.15	13.7	27.85	14.5	11.2	25.7	12.4	11.5	23.9	11.9	12.25	24.15	4	9.8	13.8	56.95	31	58.45	27	115.4
31	Hungary	Rodolphe Lencz	13.75	12.3	26.05	12.85	11.95	24.8	13.25	12.7	25.95	11.5	11.9	23.4	4	9.3	13.3	55.35	32	58.15	28	113.5
32	Belgium	G. Deck	14.35	13.5	27.85	6.7	7.75	14.45	11.6	11.6	23.2	12.75	12.9	25.65	9.3	11.05	20.35	54.7	34	56.8	31	111.5
33	Hungary	Josef Skulanyi	13.6	12.85	26.45	14.5	2.5	17	14.05	11.6	25.65	14.6	13.25	27.85	4.9	8.65	13.55	61.65	27	48.85	41	110.5
34	Luxembourg	Mathias Erang	14.35	13.55	27.9	13.5	9.55	23.05	11.3	12	23.3	9.25	13	22.25	5.5	8.1	13.6	53.9	36	56.2	33	110.1
35	Luxembourg	Nicolas Roeser	13.3	12.5	25.8	14.35	13.9	28.25	12.05	10	22.05	5.5	12.15	17.65	7.3	9	16.3	52.5	40	57.55	30	110.05
36	Belgium	G. Gysbrechts	14.15	13.7	27.85	11.5	6.25	17.75	12.25	11.5	23.75	6.6	9.45	16.05	10.65	13.7	24.35	55.15	33	54.6	35	109.75
37	Belgium	Joseph Claeys	14.35	13.35	27.7	10.9	8.65	19.55	10	12.55	22.55	10	10.7	20.7	8.9	9.3	18.2	54.15	35	54.55	36	108.7
38	Luxembourg	Dom. Schanen	14.25	13.55	27.8	9.25	11.05	20.3	9.85	9.25	19.1	12.25	11.6	23.85	7.3	9.75	17.05	52.9	39	55.2	34	108.1
39	France	Jean Chanteur	14.65	14.1	28.75	8.5	4.75	13.25	13.1	12.75	25.85	8.5	12.25	20.75	8.2	8.7	16.9	52.95	38	52.55	38	105.5
40	Luxembourg	Christian Scholtes	13.55	13	26.55	9.95	10.45	20.4	8.25	8.4	16.65	11.5	9.6	21.1	7.85	10.35	18.2	51.1	41	51.8	39	101.9
41	Luxembourg	Joseph Staudt	13.75	12.7	26.45	9.7	12.55	22.25	8.9	8.9	17.8	12.55	5	17.55	8.9	4	12.9	53.8	37	43.15	42	97.6
42	Czechoslovakia	Ladislav Tikal	14.9	13.95	28.85	11.8	0	11.8	13.1	14.45	27.55	0	0	0	11.15	12.65	23.8	50.95	42	41.05	45	92
43	Belgium	Karel van Dael	13.3	14.3	27.6	3.25	6.25	9.5	9.25	8.5	17.75	5.25	10.7	15.95	7.2	11	18.2	38.25	46	50.75	40	89
44	Belgium	G. Wilmot	13.75	13.55	27.3	5.8	4	9.8	5.75	2.95	8.7	10.98	11.8	22.78	8.9	10.3	19.2	45.18	44	42.6	43	87.6
45	France	?? Castelli	14.4	13.95	28.35	0	0	0	13.1	9.25	22.35	11.25	10.5	21.75	6.6	7.9	14.5	45.35	43	41.6	44	86.95
46	Yugoslavia	Anton Malej †	14.25	13.60	27.85	0	0	0	13.25	0	13.25	0	0	0	13.15	13.15	26.30	40.65	45	26.75	47	67.40
47	Yugoslavia	Leon Štukelj ††	14.1	15.35	29.40	0	0	31.55	0	0	0	0	0	0	15.55	16	31.55	29.65	47	31.35	46	61

†=Anton Malej of Yugoslavia could not finish the competition due to injuries sustained during the competition. This is particularly notable because, as stated above, those injuries led to his death one day after the conclusion of the competition. Those injuries proved fatal due to deficient gymnasium conditions in the substitute arena to which the competition was moved due to inclement weather conditions, as the competition was originally held outside.

††=Malej’s teammate, Leon Štukelj of Yugoslavia, could not finish the competition due to injuries sustained during the competition. This is particularly notable because, competing alongside his teammate, Malej, in conditions not suited for the competition and that also contributed to Malej's death being fatal, Štukelj was nevertheless previously 1924 Olympic All-Around Champion and 1928 Olympic All-Around Bronze Medalist and was in top form at this competition, having scored a perfect score in his Optionals Horizontal Bar exercise.

== Men's floor ==
Medal	Country	Gymnast
Gold medal	Yugoslavia	Josip Primozic
Silver medal	Czechoslovakia	Emanuel Löffler
Bronze medal	France	Alfred Krauss

== Men's pommel horse ==
Medal	Country	Gymnast
Gold medal	Yugoslavia	Josip Primozic
Silver medal	Yugoslavia	Peter Šumi
Bronze medal	Czechoslovakia	Jan Gajdos

== Men's rings ==
Medal	Country	Gymnast
Gold medal	Czechoslovakia	Emanuel Löffler
Silver medal	Czechoslovakia	Bedřich Šupčík
Bronze medal	Czechoslovakia	Jan Gajdos

== Men's parallel bars ==
Medal	Country	Gymnast
Gold medal	Yugoslavia	Josip Primozic
Silver medal	France	Alfred Krauss
Bronze medal	Czechoslovakia	Ladislav Vácha

== Men's horizontal bar ==
Medal	Country	Gymnast
Gold medal	Hungary	István Pelle
Silver medal	Hungary	Miklós Péter
Bronze medal	Yugoslavia	Leon Štukelj

== Men's team all around ==
Medal	Country
Gold medal	Czechoslovakia
Silver medal	France
Bronze medal	Yugoslavia

== Medal table ==
Rank	Nation	Gold	Silver	Bronze	Total
1	Yugoslavia	4	1	2	7
2	Czechoslovakia (TCH)	2	3	4	9
3	Hungary (HUN)	1	1	0	2
4	France (FRA)	0	2	1	3
Totals (4 entries)		7	7	7	21
