= Jan Gajdoš =

Czech gymnast (1903–1945)

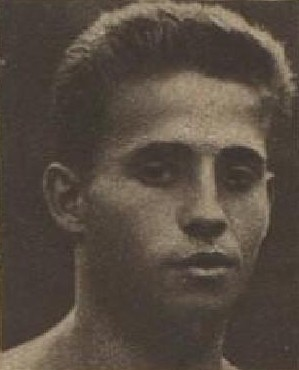
- Jan Gajdoš in 1928

Personal information
- Born: 27 December 1903 Brno, Austria-Hungary
- Died: 19 November 1945 (aged 41) Brno, Czechoslovakia

Gymnastics career
- Discipline: Men's artistic gymnastics
- Country represented: Czechoslovakia
Medal record
Representing Czechoslovakia
Olympic Games
Silver medal – second place	1928 Amsterdam	Team
World Championships
Gold medal – first place	1926 Lyon	Team
Silver medal – second place	1926 Lyon	Pommel Horse
Silver medal – second place	1926 Lyon	Parallel Bars
Gold medal – first place	1930 Luxembourg	Team
Silver medal – second place	1930 Luxembourg	All-Around
Bronze medal – third place	1930 Luxembourg	Pommel Horse
Bronze medal – third place	1930 Luxembourg	Rings
Bronze medal – third place	1931 Paris	All-Around
Silver medal – second place	1934 Budapest	Team
Gold medal – first place	1938 Prague	Team
Gold medal – first place	1938 Prague	All-Around
Gold medal – first place	1938 Prague	Floor Exercise

Jan Gajdoš (27 December 1903 – 19 November 1945) was a Czech gymnast, representing Czechoslovakia. He competed in two Olympic Games and five gymnastics World Championships.

== Gymnastics career ==
Gajdoš's first Olympic Games was in 1928, where he took silver in the team competition. Switzerland won the competition. Individually, he won no medals, but he finished fourth in the parallel bars tied with his teammate Bedřich Šupčík, twelfth in the vault, tenth in the horse, eighth in the rings and thirteenth all-around. At his next Olympics, in 1936, he again won no medals, but the team finished fourth in the team competition.

From a 1932 issue of Czechoslovak journal Věstník Sokolský showcasing 3 of their gymnasts, (L-R), 1938 World All-Around Men's Champion Jan Gajdoš, 1934 and 1938 World All-Around Women's Champion Vlasta Děkanová, and 1931 World All-Around Men's Champion and 1936 Olympic Rings Champion Alois Hudec, with a caption putting them forth, reading "Our Best" (translated from Czech)

At the World Championships, he took three golds in the team competition in 1926, 1930 and 1938. He also took a team silver in 1934. Individually, he took two silver medals in 1926. In 1930, he took overall silver, behind Josip Primožič, and also won bronze in the pommel horse and rings.

In 1934, he won no individual medals, but took sixth place overall. In his last World Championships, in 1938, he won gold both in the individual all-around and floor exercise, as well as top-8 place finishings on 4 of the 5 other apparatuses.

== Death and legacy ==
An active member of the Sokol organization during World War II, he was an active member of the Sokol resistance group. He died shortly after the end of World War II, from the effects of being put on a death march by the Nazi Germans.

Grave of Jan Gajdoš at the cemetery in Brno-Židenice

From 15–16 November 2008, an international gymnastics event was arranged in memory of Gajdoš; Jan Gajdoš Memorial 2008 in Brno.
