= Josip Primožič =

Yugoslavian gymnast (1900–1985)

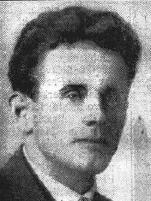

Personal information
- Born: 7 February 1900 Ljubljana, Austria-Hungary
- Died: 18 August 1985 (aged 85) Maribor, Slovenia

Gymnastics career
- Discipline: Men's artistic gymnastics
- Country represented: (Kingdom of Yugoslavia) Kingdom of Serbs, Croats and Slovenes
Medal record
Olympic Games
Representing (Kingdom of Yugoslavia) Kingdom of Serbs, Croats and Slovenes
Silver medal – second place	1928 Amsterdam	Parallel bars
Bronze medal – third place	1928 Amsterdam	Team competition
World Championships
Gold medal – first place	1930 Luxembourg	Floor
Gold medal – first place	1930 Luxembourg	All-Around
Gold medal – first place	1930 Luxembourg	Pommel Horse
Gold medal – first place	1930 Luxembourg	Parallel bars
Silver medal – second place	1926 Lyon	Horizontal bar
Silver medal – second place	1926 Lyon	Team
Bronze medal – third place	1930 Luxembourg	Team
Bronze medal – third place	1938 Prague	Parallel bars
Bronze medal – third place	1938 Prague	Team

Josip "Jože" Primožič (7 February 1900, in Ljubljana – 18 August 1985, in Maribor) was a Yugoslavian gymnast of Slovene ethnicity.

He took part in three Olympic Games and three World Championships for Yugoslavia. This gave him a total of 10 medals, two silvers at the 1926 World Artistic Gymnastics Championships, four golds and a bronze at the 1930 World Artistic Gymnastics Championships, a bronze at the 1938 World Championships, as well as a silver and a bronze at the 1928 Olympics in Amsterdam.

At the 1924 Olympics, he won no medals, but Yugoslavia came in fourth in the team competition. In 1928, he also did well individually, and came in fifth in the individual overall competition. This came after many good placings in individual events; silver in the parallel bars, fourth on the flour, and sixth on the horizontal bars. There were also no medals in his last Olympics in 1936, and his best placing was sixth in the team event.
