= Gymnastics at the 1936 Summer Olympics – Men's pommel horse =

Olympic gymnastics event

Men's pommel horse at the Games of the XI Olympiad
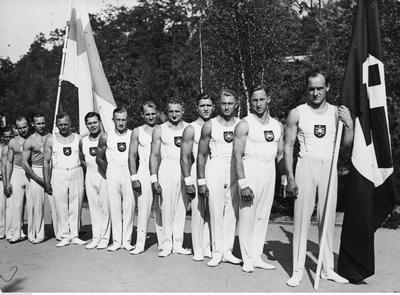
- German team
- Venue: Waldbühne
- Dates: 10–11 August 1936
- Competitors: 110 from 14 nations
- Winning score: 19.333

Medalists
1st place, gold medalist(s)		Konrad Frey; Germany
2nd place, silver medalist(s)		Eugen Mack; Switzerland
3rd place, bronze medalist(s)		Albert Bachmann; Switzerland

The men's pommel horse competition at the 1936 Summer Olympics was held at the Waldbühne on 10 and 11 August. It was the sixth appearance of the event. There were 110 competitors from 14 nations, with each nation sending a team of up to 8 men. The event was won by Konrad Frey of Germany, the nation's first victory in the event and first medal since 1896. Switzerland earned the other two medals, with Eugen Mack getting silver and Albert Bachmann receiving bronze.

== Background ==
This was the sixth appearance of the event, which is one of the five apparatus events held every time there were apparatus events at the Summer Olympics (no apparatus events were held in 1900, 1908, 1912, or 1920). Four of the 10 gymnasts from 1932 returned: gold medalist István Pelle of Hungary, bronze medalist Frank Haubold of the United States, fourth-place finisher Frank Cumiskey of the United States, sixth-place finisher Al Jochim of the United States, seventh-place finisher Heikki Savolainen of Finland, eighth-place finisher Ilmari Pakarinen of Finland, and ninth-place finisher Mauri Nyberg-Noroma of Finland. Eugen Mack of Switzerland was the reigning (1934) world champion and a favorite in the event.

Austria, Japan, and Romania each made their debut in the men's pommel horse. The United States made its fifth appearance, most of any nation, having missed only the inaugural 1896 Games.

== Competition format ==
The gymnastics format returned to the aggregation format used in 1928 but not in 1932. Each nation entered a team of eight gymnasts (Bulgaria had only 7). All entrants in the gymnastics competitions (Erang of Luxembourg did not compete in the pommel horse) performed both a compulsory exercise and a voluntary exercise, with the scores summed to give a final total. The scores in the pommel horse were added to the other apparatus scores to give individual all-around scores; the top six individual scores on each team were summed to give a team all-around score. No separate finals were contested.

The compulsory exercise was described in the Official Report:

Sidestand frontways with grip on pommels, swing right leg under left hand, scissors toward right, saving left leg under left hand, flankswing right and travel to the right to support rearways on the croup (left hand on rear pommel, right hand on croup), swing (circle) the right leg under left and right hand, dorsal swing left with ½ turn left into support rearways over the saddle, flank-swing backward under the left hand into support frontways over the pommels, swing right leg under right hand, scissors toward the left, swing left leg under right hand, circle both legs under left, right and left hand, swing right under right hand, scissors toward left, scissors toward right, swing left under left hand, circle both legs under right, left, right, left and right hand with a dorsal-swing left with ½ turn left into a side-support rearways over the croup (left hand supported with reverse undergrip on rear pommel, right hand on croup), flank-swing under left hand with ¼ turn left to cross support with both hands upon the croup, a further ¼ turn left with flank-swing right to a side-stand rearways, bending knees half deep and raising arms sideward, straighten knees and lower arms to the fundamental position. This exercise could be executed the opposite way or counter-like, but only “in toto”, not the individual parts.

== Schedule ==
Date	Time	Round
Monday, 10 August 1936; Tuesday, 11 August 1936	7:00	Final

== Results ==
Rank	Gymnast	Nation	Compulsory	Voluntary	Total
1st place, gold medalist(s)	Konrad Frey	Germany	9.800	9.533	19.333
2nd place, silver medalist(s)	Eugen Mack	Switzerland	9.500	9.667	19.167
3rd place, bronze medalist(s)	Albert Bachmann	Switzerland	9.500	9.567	19.067
4	Martti Uosikkinen	Finland	9.533	9.533	19.066
5	Walter Bach	Switzerland	9.633	9.400	19.033
5	Walter Steffens	Germany	9.500	9.533	19.033
7	Michael Reusch	Switzerland	9.600	9.400	19.000
7	Alfred Schwarzmann	Germany	9.500	9.500	19.000
9	Willi Stadel	Germany	9.467	9.400	18.867
10	Matthias Volz	Germany	9.433	9.333	18.766
11	Egidio Armelloni	Italy	9.100	9.467	18.567
11	Georges Miez	Switzerland	9.100	9.467	18.567
13	Franz Beckert	Germany	9.467	9.067	18.534
14	Oreste Capuzzo	Italy	8.967	9.467	18.434
15	Lajos Tóth	Hungary	9.300	9.067	18.367
16	Ilmari Pakarinen	Finland	9.000	9.233	18.233
17	István Pelle	Hungary	8.833	9.367	18.200
18	Fred Meyer	United States	9.033	9.133	18.166
18	Eduard Steinemann	Switzerland	9.333	8.833	18.166
20	Savino Guglielmetti	Italy	8.633	9.500	18.133
21	Frank Cumiskey	United States	8.767	9.333	18.100
21	Mauri Nyberg-Noroma	Finland	9.200	8.900	18.100
21	Otello Ternelli	Italy	9.033	9.067	18.100
24	József Hegedüs	Hungary	8.833	9.200	18.033
25	Aleksanteri Saarvala	Finland	8.500	9.467	17.967
26	Alois Hudec	Czechoslovakia	9.233	8.733	17.966
27	Nicolo Tronci	Italy	8.767	9.167	17.934
28	Jan Sládek	Czechoslovakia	8.900	9.000	17.900
28	Innozenz Stangl	Germany	9.000	8.900	17.900
30	Gottfried Hermann	Austria	8.933	8.933	17.866
31	Josef Walter	Switzerland	8.200	9.500	17.700
32	Eino Tukiainen	Finland	8.367	9.300	17.667
33	Metty Logelin	Luxembourg	8.667	8.800	17.467
34	Ernst Winter	Germany	7.833	9.600	17.433
35	Heikki Savolainen	Finland	9.267	8.133	17.400
36	Esa Seeste	Finland	8.367	9.000	17.367
37	Emanuel Löffler	Czechoslovakia	9.300	8.000	17.300
38	Leon Štukelj	Yugoslavia	8.233	9.000	17.233
39	Konrad Grilc	Yugoslavia	8.400	8.733	17.133
39	Jaroslav Kollinger	Czechoslovakia	8.133	9.000	17.133
41	Danilo Fioravanti	Italy	8.467	9.333	17.800
42	Hiroshi Nosaka	Japan	8.533	8.567	17.100
43	Franco Tognini	Italy	8.233	8.833	17.066
44	Armand Solbach	France	8.233	8.767	17.000
45	Maurice Rousseau	France	8.367	8.600	16.967
46	Miroslav Forte	Yugoslavia	8.000	8.767	16.767
47	Josip Primožič	Yugoslavia	8.167	8.533	16.700
48	Walter Beck	Switzerland	8.467	8.067	16.534
49	Karl Pannos	Austria	8.567	7.933	16.500
50	Jindrich Tintěra	Czechoslovakia	7.967	8.500	16.467
51	Hikoroku Arimoto	Japan	7.967	8.467	16.434
52	Robert Herold	France	7.467	8.933	16.400
53	Einari Teräsvirta	Finland	7.500	8.833	16.333
54	Armand Walter	France	8.100	8.200	16.300
55	Janez Pristov	Yugoslavia	8.300	7.933	16.233
56	Pius Hollenstein	Austria	7.600	8.600	16.200
57	Jan Gajdoš	Czechoslovakia	8.400	7.767	16.167
58	Frank Haubold	United States	8.867	7.167	16.034
59	Dokan Sone	Japan	8.200	7.767	15.967
60	Vratislav Petráček	Czechoslovakia	7.933	7.933	15.866
61	Jey Kugeler	Luxembourg	7.967	7.733	15.700
62	Boris Gregorka	Yugoslavia	8.200	7.400	15.600
62	Lucien Masset	France	7.233	8.367	15.600
64	Gyözö Mogyorossy	Hungary	6.733	8.767	15.500
65	Fujio Kakuta	Japan	8.100	7.300	15.400
66	Joze Vadnov	Yugoslavia	7.967	7.400	15.367
67	Yoshitaka Takeda	Japan	7.400	7.800	15.200
68	Hiroshi Matsunobu	Japan	8.467	6.600	15.067
69	Artie Pitt	United States	8.133	6.767	14.900
70	Kiichiro Toyama	Japan	7.633	7.200	14.833
71	August Sturm	Austria	6.500	8.267	14.767
72	Yoshio Miyake	Japan	7.433	7.167	14.600
73	Antoine Schildwein	France	7.600	6.967	14.567
74	Miklos Péter	Hungary	5.267	9.267	14.534
75	Franz Swoboda	Austria	6.667	7.767	14.434
76	Al Jochim	United States	7.467	6.800	14.267
77	Gábor Kecskeméti	Hungary	6.333	7.533	13.866
77	István Sárkány	Hungary	6.433	7.433	13.866
79	Franz Haupert	Luxembourg	7.333	6.333	13.666
80	Robert Pranz	Austria	5.900	7.667	13.567
81	József Sarlós	Hungary	7.433	6.033	13.466
82	Chet Phillips	United States	7.533	5.800	13.333
83	Jean Aubry	France	7.533	5.767	13.300
84	Adolf Scheffknecht	Austria	5.567	7.633	13.200
85	Dimitrije Merzlikin	Yugoslavia	7.367	5.667	13.034
86	Neno Mirchev	Bulgaria	6.000	6.800	12.800
87	Jos Romersa	Luxembourg	7.000	5.733	12.733
88	Leopold Redl	Austria	5.033	7.600	12.633
89	George Wheeler	United States	8.233	4.333	12.566
90	Paul Masino	France	6.467	5.967	12.434
91	Willy Klein	Luxembourg	5.633	6.767	12.400
92	Marcel Leineweber	Luxembourg	5.367	6.633	12.000
93	Remus Ludu	Romania	5.333	6.633	11.966
94	Jos Cillien	Luxembourg	5.933	5.900	11.833
95	Yovcho Khristov	Bulgaria	4.500	6.200	10.700
96	Kenny Griffin	United States	5.567	5.000	10.567
97	Pando Sidov	Bulgaria	4.233	5.867	10.100
98	Andrei Abraham	Romania	4.733	5.300	10.033
99	Ion Albert	Romania	4.500	5.400	9.900
100	Ivan Stoychev	Bulgaria	4.167	5.633	9.800
101	Iosif Matusec	Romania	5.100	4.400	9.500
102	Bohumil Povejšil	Czechoslovakia	8.133	1.333	9.466
103	Alexandru Dan	Romania	4.167	5.200	9.367
104	Lyuben Obretenov	Bulgaria	4.000	5.000	9.000
105	Francisc Draghici	Romania	4.033	4.700	8.733
106	Iohan Schmidt	Romania	4.267	4.233	8.500
107	Ivan Chureshki	Bulgaria	3.667	3.667	7.334
108	Georgi Dimitrov	Bulgaria	3.667	1.667	5.334
—	Romeo Neri	Italy	8.567	—	DNF
—	Vasile Moldovan	Romania	3.567	—	DNF
