= Gymnastics at the 1936 Summer Olympics – Men's parallel bars =

Olympic gymnastics event

Men's parallel bars at the Games of the XI Olympiad
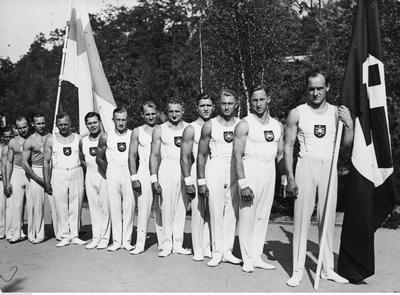
- German team
- Venue: Waldbühne
- Dates: 10–11 August 1936
- Competitors: 110 from 14 nations
- Winning score: 19.067

Medalists
1st place, gold medalist(s)		Konrad Frey; Germany
2nd place, silver medalist(s)		Michael Reusch; Switzerland
3rd place, bronze medalist(s)		Alfred Schwarzmann; Germany

The men's parallel bars competition at the 1936 Summer Olympics was held at the Waldbühne on 10 and 11 August. It was the sixth appearance of the event. There were 110 competitors from 14 nations, with each nation sending a team of up to 8 men. The event was won by Konrad Frey of Germany, the nation's first victory in the event since 1896 (and second overall, with Germany having the winning gymnast both times it competed). Germany also took the bronze, as Alfred Schwarzmann finished third. Second place and the silver medal went to Michael Reusch of Switzerland. Germany was the first nation to have two gymnasts win the parallel bars.

== Background ==
This was the sixth appearance of the event, which is one of the five apparatus events held every time there were apparatus events at the Summer Olympics (no apparatus events were held in 1900, 1908, 1912, or 1920). Eight of the 15 gymnasts from 1932 returned: silver medalist István Pelle of Hungary, bronze medalist Heikki Savolainen of Finland, fourth-place finisher Mauri Nyberg-Noroma of Finland, sixth-place finisher Al Jochim of the United States, seventh-place finishers József Hegedűs and Miklós Péter of Hungary, tenth-place finisher Savino Guglielmetti of Italy, and eleventh-place finisher Frank Haubold of the United States. All but Guglielmetti had also competed in 1928. 1932 gold medalist Romeo Neri was competing in Berlin but did not contest the parallel bars. Switzerland had swept the podium at the 1934 world championships with Eugen Mack, Josef Walter, and Walter Bach.

Austria and Romania each made their debut in the men's parallel bars. The United States made its fifth appearance, most of any nation, having missed only the inaugural 1896 Games.

== Competition format ==
The gymnastics format returned to the aggregation format used in 1928 but not in 1932. Each nation entered a team of eight gymnasts (Bulgaria had only 7). All entrants in the gymnastics competitions (Neri of Italy did not compete in the parallel bars) performed both a compulsory exercise and a voluntary exercise, with the scores summed to give a final total. The scores in the parallel bars were added to the other apparatus scores to give individual all-around scores; the top six individual scores on each team were summed to give a team all-around score. No separate finals were contested.

The compulsory exercise was described in the Official Report:

Outer sidestand: With mixed grip frontal swing into a momentary support-lever, drop backward to somersault under the bars (basket) into hand hang, glide-kip into a balance support—lift the straight body (arms slightly bent) into handstand—twice ¼ turn backward through side-support with undergrip on the bar (i.e. a total of ½ turn left or right in the handstand)—forward swing with support-turn left or right, throw body backward on the upper arms, roll backward into a momentary handstand, lower to cross-support, underswing into upper arm-hang, swing-backward to swing-stem (rise) with ½ turn left or right (support-turn), swing backward into handstand with an immediate ¼ turn left or right into a side-handstand and straddle-dismount into an outer sidestand rearways, bending knees half deep and raising arms sideward, straighten knees and lower arms to the fundamental position.

== Schedule ==
Date	Time	Round
Monday, 10 August 1936; Tuesday, 11 August 1936	7:00	Final

== Results ==
Rank	Gymnast	Nation	Compulsory	Voluntary	Total
1st place, gold medalist(s)	Konrad Frey	Germany	9.500	9.567	19.067
2nd place, silver medalist(s)	Michael Reusch	Switzerland	9.567	9.467	19.034
3rd place, bronze medalist(s)	Alfred Schwarzmann	Germany	9.500	9.467	18.967
4	Alois Hudec	Czechoslovakia	9.433	9.533	18.966
5	Eugen Mack	Switzerland	9.267	9.567	18.834
6	Walter Bach	Switzerland	9.333	9.400	18.733
7	Heikki Savolainen	Finland	9.133	9.500	18.633
8	Eduard Steinemann	Switzerland	9.200	9.300	18.500
9	Savino Guglielmetti	Italy	9.033	9.433	18.466
10	Lajos Tóth	Hungary	8.867	9.567	18.434
11	Martti Uosikkinen	Finland	9.000	9.433	18.433
12	István Pelle	Hungary	9.167	9.167	18.334
13	Albert Bachmann	Switzerland	9.100	9.167	18.267
14	Josef Walter	Switzerland	9.033	9.233	18.266
15	Miklos Péter	Hungary	9.100	9.067	18.167
16	Vratislav Petráček	Czechoslovakia	9.233	8.933	18.166
17	Mauri Nyberg-Noroma	Finland	8.867	9.267	18.134
18	Willi Stadel	Germany	9.033	9.100	18.133
19	Aleksanteri Saarvala	Finland	9.267	8.767	18.034
20	Jaroslav Kollinger	Czechoslovakia	8.933	9.033	17.966
21	Franz Beckert	Germany	8.800	9.133	17.933
22	Leon Štukelj	Yugoslavia	9.067	8.800	17.867
23	Walter Beck	Switzerland	8.900	8.800	17.700
24	Yoshitaka Takeda	Japan	8.800	8.867	17.667
25	Hiroshi Nosaka	Japan	8.700	8.833	17.533
25	Josip Primožič	Yugoslavia	8.700	8.833	17.533
27	Georges Miez	Switzerland	8.567	8.933	17.500
27	Einari Teräsvirta	Finland	8.767	8.733	17.500
29	Jan Gajdoš	Czechoslovakia	8.533	8.933	17.466
30	Chet Phillips	United States	8.200	9.200	17.400
31	Nicolo Tronci	Italy	8.433	8.900	17.333
32	Jindrich Tintěra	Czechoslovakia	8.533	8.733	17.266
33	Gottfried Hermann	Austria	8.400	8.800	17.200
34	Metty Logelin	Luxembourg	8.400	8.700	17.100
34	George Wheeler	United States	8.667	8.433	17.100
36	Emanuel Löffler	Czechoslovakia	8.167	8.900	17.067
37	Jan Sládek	Czechoslovakia	8.433	8.633	17.066
38	Matthias Volz	Germany	7.933	9.100	17.033
39	Konrad Grilc	Yugoslavia	9.133	7.833	16.966
40	Franco Tognini	Italy	8.133	8.800	16.933
41	Frank Cumiskey	United States	8.467	8.433	16.900
42	Jey Kugeler	Luxembourg	8.067	8.767	16.834
42	Bohumil Povejšil	Czechoslovakia	8.867	7.967	16.834
42	Walter Steffens	Germany	7.467	9.367	16.834
45	Gábor Kecskeméti	Hungary	7.733	9.067	16.800
46	Karl Pannos	Austria	8.500	8.267	16.767
46	Eino Tukiainen	Finland	8.000	8.767	16.767
48	Robert Herold	France	8.233	8.367	16.600
49	Ernst Winter	Germany	7.700	8.800	16.500
50	Yoshio Miyake	Japan	7.400	9.067	16.467
51	Miroslav Forte	Yugoslavia	8.833	7.633	16.466
52	Esa Seeste	Finland	8.667	7.767	16.434
53	Egidio Armelloni	Italy	7.300	8.900	16.200
54	Lucien Masset	France	8.167	8.000	16.167
54	Maurice Rousseau	France	8.067	8.100	16.167
56	Armand Solbach	France	8.133	8.000	16.133
57	Oreste Capuzzo	Italy	7.533	8.567	16.100
58	Antoine Schildwein	France	8.333	7.600	15.933
59	Kenny Griffin	United States	7.633	8.200	15.833
59	August Sturm	Austria	8.033	7.800	15.833
61	Fred Meyer	United States	7.767	8.000	15.767
61	Kiichiro Toyama	Japan	8.200	7.567	15.767
63	Gyözö Mogyorossy	Hungary	7.733	8.000	15.733
63	Innozenz Stangl	Germany	9.333	6.400	15.733
63	Armand Walter	France	8.033	7.700	15.733
66	Dimitrije Merzlikin	Yugoslavia	8.867	6.800	15.667
67	Ilmari Pakarinen	Finland	6.633	9.033	15.666
68	Danilo Fioravanti	Italy	7.567	8.033	15.600
69	Otello Ternelli	Italy	7.333	8.167	15.500
70	Joze Vadnov	Yugoslavia	7.600	7.833	15.433
71	József Hegedüs	Hungary	7.200	8.033	15.233
72	Paul Masino	France	7.367	7.767	15.134
73	Hiroshi Matsunobu	Japan	7.233	7.600	14.833
74	Janez Pristov	Yugoslavia	8.000	6.667	14.667
75	József Sarlós	Hungary	5.467	9.133	14.600
76	István Sárkány	Hungary	6.333	8.133	14.466
77	Fujio Kakuta	Japan	6.500	7.933	14.433
78	Hikoroku Arimoto	Japan	6.233	7.900	14.133
78	Neno Mirchev	Bulgaria	5.800	8.333	14.133
80	Frank Haubold	United States	5.500	8.600	14.100
80	Pius Hollenstein	Austria	6.767	7.333	14.100
82	Jos Romersa	Luxembourg	6.267	7.767	14.034
83	Adolf Scheffknecht	Austria	6.700	7.333	14.033
84	Jean Aubry	France	8.133	5.767	13.900
85	Robert Pranz	Austria	6.767	7.100	13.867
86	Boris Gregorka	Yugoslavia	6.700	7.033	13.733
87	Artie Pitt	United States	8.367	5.200	13.567
88	Georgi Dimitrov	Bulgaria	6.433	6.867	13.300
89	Franz Swoboda	Austria	5.967	7.300	13.267
90	Dokan Sone	Japan	5.800	7.333	13.133
91	Yovcho Khristov	Bulgaria	6.667	6.433	13.100
91	Willy Klein	Luxembourg	6.433	6.667	13.100
93	Jos Cillien	Luxembourg	5.567	7.200	12.767
94	Andrei Abraham	Romania	4.900	6.767	11.667
94	Marcel Leineweber	Luxembourg	5.767	5.900	11.667
96	Al Jochim	United States	3.067	8.267	11.334
97	Lyuben Obretenov	Bulgaria	4.700	6.333	11.033
98	Franz Haupert	Luxembourg	4.133	6.733	10.866
99	Ivan Chureshki	Bulgaria	5.233	5.333	10.566
100	Alexandru Dan	Romania	4.533	5.633	10.166
101	Iosif Matusec	Romania	3.767	6.233	10.000
102	Francisc Draghici	Romania	2.667	7.133	9.800
103	Pando Sidov	Bulgaria	3.767	5.733	9.500
104	Leopold Redl	Austria	7.467	2.000	9.467
105	Ion Albert	Romania	2.333	6.433	8.766
106	Iohan Schmidt	Romania	2.867	5.333	8.200
107	Remus Ludu	Romania	2.700	5.067	7.767
108	Ivan Stoychev	Bulgaria	1.667	5.900	7.567
—	Mathias Erang	Luxembourg	6.167	—	DNF
—	Vasile Moldovan	Romania	4.400	—	DNF
