= Gymnastics at the 1936 Summer Olympics – Men's rings =

Olympic gymnastics event

Men's rings at the Games of the XI Olympiad
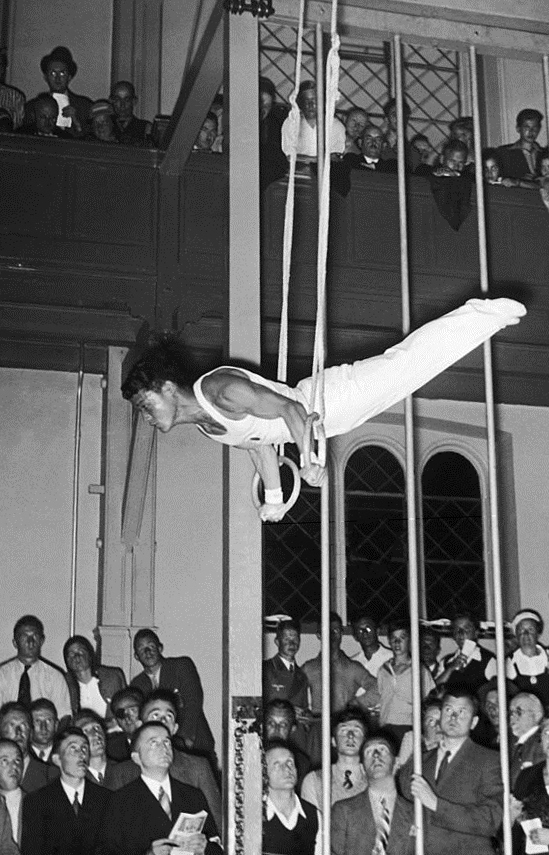
- Hikoroku Arimoto competing on the rings
- Venue: Waldbühne
- Dates: 10–11 August 1936
- Competitors: 111 from 14 nations
- Winning score: 19.433

Medalists
1st place, gold medalist(s)		Alois Hudec; Czechoslovakia
2nd place, silver medalist(s)		Leon Štukelj; Yugoslavia
3rd place, bronze medalist(s)		Matthias Volz; Germany

The men's rings competition at the 1936 Summer Olympics was held at the Waldbühne on 10 and 11 August. It was the sixth appearance of the event. There were 111 competitors from 14 nations, with each nation sending a team of up to 8 men. The event was won by Alois Hudec of Czechoslovakia, the nation's first victory after winning two silver medals and two bronze medals in 1924 and 1928. Leon Štukelj was the silver medalist in Berlin, the second man to earn two medals in the rings after his 1928 gold. Host Germany took a bronze medal, its first in the rings since 1896, as Matthias Volz finished third.

== Background ==
This was the sixth appearance of the event, which is one of the five apparatus events held every time there were apparatus events at the Summer Olympics (no apparatus events were held in 1900, 1908, 1912, or 1920). Six of the 14 gymnasts from 1932 returned: fifth-place finisher Oreste Capuzzo and sixth-place finisher Franco Tognini of Italy, seventh-place finisher Heikki Savolainen and fourteenth-place finisher Mauri Nyberg-Noroma of Finland, and twelfth-place finisher István Pelle and thirteenth-place finisher József Hegedűs of Hungary. Alois Hudec of Czechoslovakia was the reigning (1934) world champion.

Austria, Bulgaria, and Romania each made their debut in the men's rings. The United States made its fifth appearance, most of any nation, having missed only the inaugural 1896 Games.

== Competition format ==
The gymnastics format returned to the aggregation format used in 1928 but not in 1932. Each nation entered a team of eight gymnasts (Bulgaria had only 7). All entrants in the gymnastics competitions performed both a compulsory exercise and a voluntary exercise, with the scores summed to give a final total. The scores in the rings were added to the other apparatus scores to give individual all-around scores; the top six individual scores on each team were summed to give a team all-around score. No separate finals were contested.

The compulsory exercise was described in the Official Report (dashes indicate "clearly perceptible" pauses):

Straight hang (it was optional whether grip was high up with the balls of the hands or not)—Raise the straight body into an inverte hang, bend hips in the half inverted hang, hip-swing-up into balance-support—Raise the bent body into handstand—Lower to a free lever with straight arms—Lower to a hang with arms sideward (cross hang)—Lower to a lever frontways, swing downward backward, and dislocate forward to inverted hang, drop forward and swing backward with a stem (rise) to support, circle backward to a handstand-Lower to balance-support, lower legs to support, bend arms slightly and throw body backward to a hang, dislocate (high) backward to hang, swing forward and turn-over (backward) with straddling of legs to stand, bending knees half-deep and raising arms sideward, straighten knees and lower arms to fundamental position.

== Schedule ==
Date	Time	Round
Monday, 10 August 1936; Tuesday, 11 August 1936	7:00	Final

== Results ==
Rank	Gymnast	Nation	Compulsory	Voluntary	Total
1st place, gold medalist(s)	Alois Hudec	Czechoslovakia	9.633	9.800	19.433
2nd place, silver medalist(s)	Leon Štukelj	Yugoslavia	9.467	9.400	18.867
3rd place, bronze medalist(s)	Matthias Volz	Germany	9.100	9.567	18.667
4	Alfred Schwarzmann	Germany	9.167	9.367	18.534
5	Franz Beckert	Germany	9.033	9.500	18.533
6	Michael Reusch	Switzerland	9.067	9.367	18.434
7	Jaroslav Kollinger	Czechoslovakia	9.000	9.433	18.433
8	Heikki Savolainen	Finland	9.233	9.167	18.400
9	Oreste Capuzzo	Italy	8.967	9.400	18.367
10	Emanuel Löffler	Czechoslovakia	8.933	9.300	18.233
11	Gábor Kecskeméti	Hungary	8.867	9.233	18.100
12	Vratislav Petráček	Czechoslovakia	8.767	9.267	18.034
13	Eugen Mack	Switzerland	8.733	9.267	18.000
14	Savino Guglielmetti	Italy	8.833	9.133	17.966
15	Paul Masino	France	8.933	9.000	17.933
16	Jey Kugeler	Luxembourg	8.700	9.167	17.867
17	Mauri Nyberg-Noroma	Finland	8.767	9.033	17.800
18	Konrad Frey	Germany	8.533	9.200	17.733
19	Antoine Schildwein	France	8.767	8.933	17.700
19	Nicolo Tronci	Italy	8.667	9.033	17.700
21	Jan Gajdoš	Czechoslovakia	8.633	9.033	17.666
22	Martti Uosikkinen	Finland	8.267	9.367	17.634
23	Aleksanteri Saarvala	Finland	8.600	8.933	17.533
23	József Sarlós	Hungary	8.433	9.100	17.533
25	István Pelle	Hungary	8.533	8.933	17.466
26	Innozenz Stangl	Germany	8.600	8.767	17.367
27	Jindrich Tintěra	Czechoslovakia	8.367	8.867	17.234
27	Eino Tukiainen	Finland	8.467	8.767	17.234
29	Albert Bachmann	Switzerland	8.300	8.900	17.200
29	István Sárkány	Hungary	8.167	9.033	17.200
31	Eduard Steinemann	Switzerland	8.300	8.867	17.167
32	Metty Logelin	Luxembourg	8.533	8.633	17.166
32	Maurice Rousseau	France	8.733	8.433	17.166
34	Jan Sládek	Czechoslovakia	8.000	9.033	17.033
35	Kiichiro Toyama	Japan	8.133	8.867	17.000
36	Willi Stadel	Germany	8.433	8.533	16.966
37	József Hegedüs	Hungary	7.933	8.933	16.866
37	Franco Tognini	Italy	8.333	8.533	16.866
39	Konrad Grilc	Yugoslavia	8.933	7.867	16.800
40	Esa Seeste	Finland	8.233	8.500	16.733
41	Miroslav Forte	Yugoslavia	8.633	8.067	16.700
41	Dokan Sone	Japan	8.467	8.233	16.700
43	Dimitrije Merzlikin	Yugoslavia	8.567	8.100	16.667
44	Einari Teräsvirta	Finland	8.300	8.333	16.633
45	Ilmari Pakarinen	Finland	8.300	8.300	16.600
45	Danilo Fioravanti	Italy	8.133	8.467	16.600
47	Lucien Masset	France	8.033	8.533	16.566
48	Armand Solbach	France	8.000	8.533	16.533
49	Neno Mirchev	Bulgaria	7.800	8.667	16.467
50	Lajos Tóth	Hungary	7.500	8.933	16.433
51	Hikoroku Arimoto	Japan	8.233	8.167	16.400
52	Al Jochim	United States	7.767	8.567	16.334
53	Josip Primožič	Yugoslavia	8.300	8.000	16.300
54	Armand Walter	France	7.733	8.500	16.233
55	Egidio Armelloni	Italy	7.200	9.000	16.200
55	Walter Bach	Switzerland	7.667	8.533	16.200
57	Ernst Winter	Germany	7.967	8.200	16.167
58	Walter Steffens	Germany	8.033	8.100	16.133
59	Miklos Péter	Hungary	7.433	8.667	16.100
60	Joze Vadnov	Yugoslavia	8.600	7.467	16.067
61	Otello Ternelli	Italy	7.733	8.333	16.066
62	Walter Beck	Switzerland	7.733	8.233	15.966
62	Janez Pristov	Yugoslavia	8.133	7.833	15.966
64	Jean Aubry	France	7.933	7.967	15.900
64	Georges Miez	Switzerland	7.233	8.667	15.900
66	Bohumil Povejšil	Czechoslovakia	7.167	8.600	15.767
67	Yoshitaka Takeda	Japan	7.367	8.333	15.700
68	Kenny Griffin	United States	7.233	8.167	15.400
68	Robert Herold	France	7.333	8.067	15.400
68	Yoshio Miyake	Japan	7.767	7.633	15.400
71	Josef Walter	Switzerland	6.900	8.267	15.167
72	Hiroshi Nosaka	Japan	7.633	7.500	15.133
73	Jos Romersa	Luxembourg	7.533	7.500	15.033
74	Ivan Chureshki	Bulgaria	7.200	7.667	14.867
75	Artie Pitt	United States	7.467	7.233	14.700
76	Leopold Redl	Austria	6.967	7.700	14.667
77	Gyözö Mogyorossy	Hungary	6.233	8.433	14.666
78	Francisc Draghici	Romania	6.500	8.067	14.567
79	Franz Haupert	Luxembourg	7.533	6.933	14.466
80	Boris Gregorka	Yugoslavia	6.933	7.367	14.300
80	Fujio Kakuta	Japan	6.600	7.700	14.300
82	Frank Cumiskey	United States	6.467	7.767	14.234
83	Hiroshi Matsunobu	Japan	7.333	6.767	14.100
84	Yovcho Khristov	Bulgaria	5.567	8.367	13.934
85	Pando Sidov	Bulgaria	6.267	7.567	13.834
86	Georgi Dimitrov	Bulgaria	6.400	7.333	13.733
87	George Wheeler	United States	6.767	6.667	13.434
88	Chet Phillips	United States	6.567	6.567	13.134
89	Frank Haubold	United States	5.600	7.400	13.000
90	Ivan Stoychev	Bulgaria	5.833	7.067	12.900
91	Robert Pranz	Austria	6.233	6.433	12.666
92	Willy Klein	Luxembourg	6.333	6.067	12.400
93	Jos Cillien	Luxembourg	6.067	6.200	12.267
94	Karl Pannos	Austria	5.667	7.333	12.000
95	Pius Hollenstein	Austria	5.467	6.467	11.934
96	August Sturm	Austria	5.467	6.333	11.800
97	Gottfried Hermann	Austria	4.967	6.700	11.667
98	Iosif Matusec	Romania	5.000	6.567	11.567
98	Fred Meyer	United States	5.600	5.967	11.567
100	Marcel Leineweber	Luxembourg	5.867	5.667	11.534
101	Remus Ludu	Romania	5.200	6.167	11.367
102	Lyuben Obretenov	Bulgaria	4.733	6.133	10.866
103	Andrei Abraham	Romania	4.833	5.867	10.700
104	Franz Swoboda	Austria	4.000	6.500	10.500
105	Adolf Scheffknecht	Austria	4.433	5.933	10.366
106	Alexandru Dan	Romania	5.267	5.067	10.334
107	Ion Albert	Romania	3.000	5.900	8.900
108	Iohan Schmidt	Romania	2.167	4.567	6.734
—	Romeo Neri	Italy	8.733	—	DNF
—	Mathias Erang	Luxembourg	7.167	—	DNF
—	Vasile Moldovan	Romania	4.667	—	DNF
