= Gymnastics at the 1936 Summer Olympics – Men's vault =

Gymnastics at the Olympics

Men's vault at the Games of the XI Olympiad
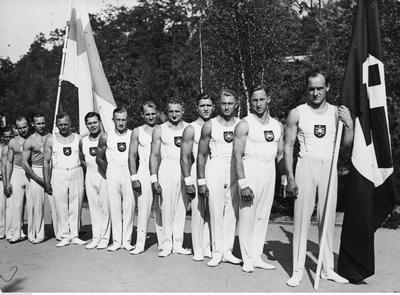
- German team
- Venue: Waldbühne
- Date: 10 August 1936
- Competitors: 110 from 14 nations
- Winning score: 19.200

Medalists
1st place, gold medalist(s)		Alfred Schwarzmann	Germany
2nd place, silver medalist(s)		Eugen Mack	Switzerland
3rd place, bronze medalist(s)		Matthias Volz	Germany

The men's vault (or "horse vault" or "long horse") competition at the 1936 Summer Olympics was held at the Waldbühne on 10 August. It was the sixth appearance of the event. There were 110 competitors from 14 nations, with each nation sending a team of up to 8 men. The event was won by Alfred Schwarzmann of Germany, the nation's first victory in the event since 1896 and second overall. Eugen Mack of Switzerland earned silver, the first man to win multiple medals in the event (he had won gold in 1928). Another member of the host German team, Matthias Volz, took bronze.

== Background ==
This was the sixth appearance of the event, which is one of the five apparatus events held every time there were apparatus events at the Summer Olympics (no apparatus events were held in 1900, 1908, 1912, or 1920). Four of the 10 gymnasts from 1932 returned: gold medalist Savino Guglielmetti of Italy, silver medalist Al Jochim of the United States, fourth-place finisher Einari Teräsvirta of Finland, sixth-place finisher István Pelle of Hungary, seventh-place finisher Miklós Péter of Hungary, and tenth-place finisher Heikki Savolainen of Finland. Also returning was 1928 gold medalist Eugen Mack of Switzerland, who had also won the first world championship in the apparatus in 1934. Alfred Schwarzmann of host Germany was among the favorites as well.

Austria, Japan, and Romania each made their debut in the men's vault. The United States made its fifth appearance, most of any nation, having missed only the inaugural 1896 Games.

== Competition format ==
The gymnastics format returned to the aggregation format used in 1928 but not in 1932. The event used a "vaulting horse" aligned parallel to the gymnast's run (rather than the modern "vaulting table" in use since 2004). Each nation entered a team of eight gymnasts (Bulgaria had only 7). All entrants in the gymnastics competitions (Neri of Italy did not compete in the vault) performed both a compulsory exercise and a voluntary exercise, with the scores summed to give a final total. Two vaults were done for each, with the better score counted. The scores in the vault were added to the other apparatus scores to give individual all-around scores; the top six individual scores on each team were summed to give a team all-around score. No separate finals were contested.

The compulsory vault was described in the Official Report:

With a running start and support upon croup; stoop vault. The body was pushed off vigorously; at first the legs were squatted, but soon straightened. During the flight the body was straightened out vigorously. Landing with knees bent half deep and arms raised sideward, knees straightened and arms lowered to fundamental position.

== Schedule ==
Date	Time	Round
Monday, 10 August 1936	7:00	Final

== Results ==
Rank	Gymnast	Nation	Compulsory	Voluntary	Total
1st place, gold medalist(s)	Alfred Schwarzmann	Germany	9.433	9.767	19.200
2nd place, silver medalist(s)	Eugen Mack	Switzerland	9.267	9.700	18.967
3rd place, bronze medalist(s)	Matthias Volz	Germany	8.967	9.500	18.467
4	Walter Bach	Switzerland	9.233	9.167	18.400
5	Walter Beck	Switzerland	8.700	9.667	18.367
6	Martti Uosikkinen	Finland	9.167	9.133	18.300
7	Michael Reusch	Switzerland	8.833	9.433	18.266
8	Georges Miez	Switzerland	9.067	9.167	18.234
8	Josef Walter	Switzerland	8.667	9.567	18.234
10	Eduard Steinemann	Switzerland	9.000	9.200	18.200
11	Konrad Grilc	Yugoslavia	9.200	8.900	18.100
12	Danilo Fioravanti	Italy	8.967	9.100	18.067
13	Savino Guglielmetti	Italy	8.867	9.167	18.034
14	Willi Stadel	Germany	9.100	8.933	18.033
15	Albert Bachmann	Switzerland	8.267	9.700	17.967
16	Miroslav Forte	Yugoslavia	9.067	8.867	17.934
17	Ernst Winter	Germany	8.433	9.467	17.900
18	Alois Hudec	Czechoslovakia	8.667	9.200	17.867
19	Innozenz Stangl	Germany	8.367	9.300	17.667
20	Konrad Frey	Germany	8.333	9.333	17.666
21	Joze Vadnov	Yugoslavia	9.067	8.567	17.634
22	Jindrich Tintěra	Czechoslovakia	8.867	8.733	17.600
23	Jan Gajdoš	Czechoslovakia	8.733	8.833	17.566
24	George Wheeler	United States	8.333	9.100	17.433
25	Franz Beckert	Germany	8.333	9.067	17.400
26	Franco Tognini	Italy	8.500	8.867	17.367
27	Jaroslav Kollinger	Czechoslovakia	8.633	8.667	17.300
27	Neno Mirchev	Bulgaria	8.233	9.067	17.300
29	Walter Steffens	Germany	8.867	8.367	17.234
30	Jan Sládek	Czechoslovakia	8.700	8.533	17.233
31	Jey Kugeler	Luxembourg	8.433	8.767	17.200
31	Mauri Nyberg-Noroma	Finland	8.600	8.600	17.200
31	István Sárkány	Hungary	8.700	8.500	17.200
31	Yoshitaka Takeda	Japan	8.667	8.533	17.200
35	Miklos Péter	Hungary	7.900	9.233	17.133
35	Josip Primožič	Yugoslavia	8.833	8.300	17.133
37	Esa Seeste	Finland	8.133	8.967	17.100
38	Heikki Savolainen	Finland	8.133	8.867	17.000
39	Karl Pannos	Austria	8.667	8.300	16.967
40	Janez Pristov	Yugoslavia	8.500	8.433	16.933
41	Egidio Armelloni	Italy	8.367	8.533	16.900
42	Vratislav Petráček	Czechoslovakia	8.100	8.700	16.800
43	Bohumil Povejšil	Czechoslovakia	8.833	7.933	16.766
44	Fred Meyer	United States	7.933	8.767	16.700
45	Frank Cumiskey	United States	7.400	9.267	16.667
45	Armand Walter	France	8.000	8.667	16.667
47	Hikoroku Arimoto	Japan	8.500	8.133	16.633
48	Einari Teräsvirta	Finland	8.167	8.367	16.534
49	Georgi Dimitrov	Bulgaria	8.300	8.200	16.500
50	Boris Gregorka	Yugoslavia	8.233	8.200	16.433
50	Otello Ternelli	Italy	7.800	8.633	16.433
52	Franz Swoboda	Austria	8.200	8.200	16.400
53	Yoshio Miyake	Japan	8.000	8.333	16.333
54	August Sturm	Austria	7.433	8.867	16.300
55	Antoine Schildwein	France	7.900	8.367	16.267
56	Leopold Redl	Austria	7.333	8.800	16.133
57	Ilmari Pakarinen	Finland	7.567	8.533	16.100
58	Jos Romersa	Luxembourg	7.767	8.300	16.067
59	Dokan Sone	Japan	7.933	8.033	15.966
60	Paul Masino	France	8.033	7.900	15.933
60	Chet Phillips	United States	8.400	7.533	15.933
62	Kiichiro Toyama	Japan	8.000	7.833	15.833
63	Lucien Masset	France	7.567	8.233	15.800
64	István Pelle	Hungary	7.500	8.233	15.733
65	Fujio Kakuta	Japan	7.433	8.167	15.600
66	Emanuel Löffler	Czechoslovakia	7.067	8.500	15.567
67	Eino Tukiainen	Finland	8.633	6.933	15.566
68	Robert Herold	France	7.867	7.667	15.534
69	Francisc Draghici	Romania	7.233	8.233	15.466
70	József Sarlós	Hungary	6.933	8.467	15.400
71	Gábor Kecskeméti	Hungary	7.500	7.867	15.367
72	Gottfried Hermann	Austria	8.933	6.300	15.233
72	Artie Pitt	United States	7.100	8.133	15.233
74	Maurice Rousseau	France	7.200	8.000	15.200
75	Aleksanteri Saarvala	Finland	7.800	7.367	15.167
76	Kenny Griffin	United States	6.567	8.567	15.134
77	Frank Haubold	United States	6.933	8.100	15.033
77	Pius Hollenstein	Austria	7.900	7.133	15.033
79	Oreste Capuzzo	Italy	8.633	6.333	14.966
80	Franz Haupert	Luxembourg	7.667	7.233	14.900
81	Dimitrije Merzlikin	Yugoslavia	5.667	9.133	14.800
81	Armand Solbach	France	8.067	6.733	14.800
83	Ivan Chureshki	Bulgaria	7.933	6.800	14.733
83	Marcel Leineweber	Luxembourg	6.600	8.133	14.733
85	Nicolo Tronci	Italy	8.100	6.567	14.667
86	Adolf Scheffknecht	Austria	7.167	7.467	14.634
87	Lajos Tóth	Hungary	6.033	8.600	14.633
88	Metty Logelin	Luxembourg	7.000	7.333	14.333
89	Hiroshi Matsunobu	Japan	6.800	7.467	14.267
90	Willy Klein	Luxembourg	7.233	7.000	14.233
91	Jean Aubry	France	7.567	6.500	14.067
92	Leon Štukelj	Yugoslavia	8.233	5.667	13.900
93	Yovcho Khristov	Bulgaria	7.500	6.300	13.800
94	Al Jochim	United States	6.333	7.433	13.766
95	Lyuben Obretenov	Bulgaria	5.833	7.767	13.600
96	Hiroshi Nosaka	Japan	5.333	8.200	13.533
97	József Hegedüs	Hungary	6.833	6.667	13.500
98	Gyözö Mogyorossy	Hungary	8.400	5.000	13.400
99	Pando Sidov	Bulgaria	7.733	4.167	11.900
100	Vasile Moldovan	Romania	6.500	5.167	11.667
101	Robert Pranz	Austria	5.667	4.767	10.434
102	Jos Cillien	Luxembourg	4.667	4.400	9.067
103	Iosif Matusec	Romania	5.000	4.000	9.000
104	Remus Ludu	Romania	4.333	4.200	8.533
105	Mathias Erang	Luxembourg	4.333	4.000	8.333
106	Alexandru Dan	Romania	4.833	3.333	8.166
107	Ion Albert	Romania	2.900	5.200	8.100
108	Ivan Stoychev	Bulgaria	4.733	2.467	7.200
109	Andrei Abraham	Romania	1.867	4.533	6.400
110	Iohan Schmidt	Romania	1.500	4.133	5.633
