= Gymnastics at the 1936 Summer Olympics – Men's artistic individual all-around =

Olympic gymnastics event

Men's artistic individual all-around at the Games of the XI Olympiad
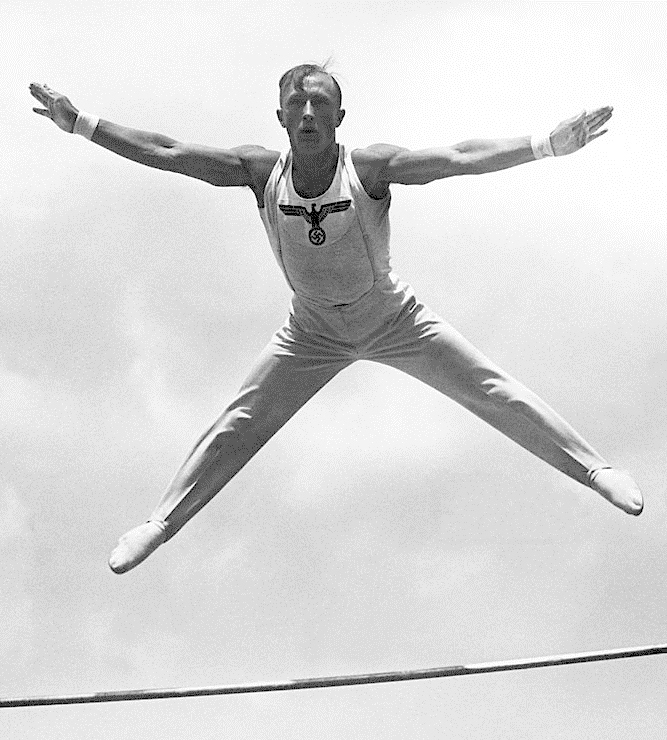
- Gold medalist Alfred Schwarzmann during the horizontal bar
- Venue: Waldbühne
- Dates: 10–11 August 1936
- Competitors: 111 from 14 nations
- Winning score: 113.100

Medalists
1st place, gold medalist(s)		Alfred Schwarzmann; Germany
2nd place, silver medalist(s)		Eugen Mack; Switzerland
3rd place, bronze medalist(s)		Konrad Frey; Germany

The men's artistic individual all-around competition at the 1936 Summer Olympics was held at the Waldbühne on 10 and 11 August. It was the ninth appearance of the event. There were 111 competitors from 14 nations, with each nation sending up to 8 competitors. The event was won by Alfred Schwarzmann of Germany, the nation's first victory in the men's individual all-around. Germany also received bronze, with Konrad Frey taking third. Silver went to Switzerland's Eugen Mack.

== Background ==
This was the ninth appearance of the men's individual all-around. The first individual all-around competition had been held in 1900, after the 1896 competitions featured only individual apparatus events. A men's individual all-around has been held every Games since 1900.

Nine of the top 10 gymnasts from the 1932 Games returned: gold medalist Romeo Neri of Italy, silver medalist István Pelle of Hungary, bronze medalist Heikki Savolainen of Finland, fifth-place finisher Savino Guglielmetti of Italy, sixth-place finisher Frank Haubold of the United States, seventh-place finisher Oreste Capuzzo of Italy, eighth-place finisher Fred Meyer of the United States, ninth-place finisher Mauri Nyberg-Noroma of Finland, and tenth-place finisher Al Jochim of the United States. Neri, Nyberg-Noroma, and Savolainen had all been in the top 10 in 1928 as well. The reigning (1934) World Champion was Eugen Mack of Switzerland, with Nero second and Emanuel Löffler of Czechoslovakia third.

Austria, Bulgaria, and Romania each made their debut in the event. Italy made its eighth appearance, most among nations, having missed only the 1904 Games in St. Louis.

== Competition format ==
The gymnastics format returned to the aggregation format used in 1928 but not in 1932. Each nation entered a team of eight gymnasts (Bulgaria had only 7). Scores for each exercise were on a scale of 0 to 10. All entrants in the gymnastics competitions performed both a compulsory exercise and a voluntary exercise, with the scores summed to give a final total for each apparatus of up to 20. The scores in each of the six apparatus competitions were added together to give individual all-around scores (up to 120); the top six individual scores on each team were summed to give a team all-around score (up to 720). No separate finals were contested.

== Schedule ==
There were two sessions each day. Nations assigned to one session on Day 1 as follows:

- Day 1 morning: Austria, Bulgaria, Finland, Hungary, Japan, United States, Yugoslavia
- Day 1 afternoon: Czechoslovakia, France, Germany Italy, Luxembourg, Romania, Switzerland

On day 2, the assignments were based on the standings for the team event with the leading nations going in the later session:

- Day 2 morning: Austria, Bulgaria, France, Hungary, Italy, Japan, Luxembourg, Romania, United States, Yugoslavia
- Day 2 afternoon: Czechoslovakia, Finland, Germany, Switzerland

Date	Time	Round
Monday, 10 August 1936	7:00; 14:00	Compulsory exercises and vault voluntary exercise morning session Compulsory exercises and vault voluntary exercise afternoon session
Tuesday, 11 August 1936	7:00; 14:00	Voluntary exercises except vault morning session Voluntary exercises except vault afternoon session

== Results ==
Romeo Neri, the individual all-around champion from the previous 1932 Summer Olympics, injured himself during the competition and finished last.

Rank	Gymnast	Nation	Floor (gymnastics)	Pommel horse	Rings (gymnastics)	Vault (gymnastics)	Parallel bars	Horizontal bar	Total
1st place, gold medalist(s)	Alfred Schwarzmann	Germany	18.166	19.000	18.534	19.200	18.968	19.233	113.100
2nd place, silver medalist(s)	Eugen Mack	Switzerland	18.466	19.167	18.000	18.967	18.834	18.900	112.334
3rd place, bronze medalist(s)	Konrad Frey	Germany	18.466	19.333	17.733	17.666	19.067	19.267	111.532
4	Alois Hudec	Czechoslovakia	18.133	17.966	19.433	17.867	18.966	18.834	111.199
5	Michael Reusch	Switzerland	17.400	19.000	18.434	18.266	19.034	18.566	110.700
5	Martti Uosikkinen	Finland	18.267	19.066	17.634	18.300	18.433	19.000	110.700
7	Matthias Volz	Germany	18.366	18.766	18.667	18.467	17.033	18.800	110.099
8	Willi Stadel	Germany	18.300	18.867	16.966	18.033	18.133	18.700	108.999
9	Heikki Savolainen	Finland	18.200	17.400	18.400	17.000	18.633	19.133	108.766
10	Eduard Steinemann	Switzerland	17.800	18.166	17.167	18.200	18.500	18.800	108.633
11	Walter Bach	Switzerland	17.600	19.033	16.200	18.400	18.733	18.333	108.299
12	Savino Guglielmetti	Italy	17.167	18.133	17.966	18.034	16.466	17.933	107.699
13	Albert Bachmann	Switzerland	17.667	19.067	17.200	17.967	18.267	17.334	107.502
14	Georges Miez	Switzerland	18.666	18.567	15.900	18.234	17.500	18.467	107.334
15	Franz Beckert	Germany	17.767	18.534	18.533	17.400	17.933	17.033	107.250
16	Mauri Nyberg-Noroma	Finland	16.967	18.100	17.800	17.200	18.134	18.600	106.801
17	Walter Steffens	Germany	18.300	19.033	16.133	17.234	16.834	18.966	106.500
18	István Pelle	Hungary	17.367	18.200	17.466	15.733	18.334	18.466	105.566
19	Aleksanteri Saarvala	Finland	17.167	17.967	17.533	15.167	18.034	19.367	105.235
20	Innozenz Stangl	Germany	17.133	17.900	17.367	17.667	15.733	19.167	104.967
21	Josef Walter	Switzerland	18.500	17.700	15.167	18.234	18.266	16.900	104.767
22	Walter Beck	Switzerland	18.000	16.534	15.966	18.367	17.700	18.167	104.734
23	Jaroslav Kollinger	Czechoslovakia	17.134	17.133	18.433	17.300	17.966	16.767	104.733
24	Esa Seeste	Finland	17.800	17.367	16.733	17.100	16.434	18.500	103.934
25	Konrad Grilc	Yugoslavia	16.266	17.133	16.800	18.100	16.966	18.367	103.632
26	Jan Sládek	Czechoslovakia	16.800	17.900	17.033	17.233	17.066	17.367	103.399
27	Jan Gajdoš	Czechoslovakia	18.000	16.167	17.666	17.566	17.466	16.200	103.065
28	Ilmari Pakarinen	Finland	17.366	18.233	16.600	16.100	15.666	19.067	103.032
29	Einari Teräsvirta	Finland	17.133	16.333	16.633	16.534	17.500	18.733	102.866
30	Oreste Capuzzo	Italy	17.233	18.434	18.367	14.966	18.100	17.400	102.500
31	Josip Primožič	Yugoslavia	17.334	16.700	16.300	17.133	17.533	17.367	102.367
32	Leon Štukelj	Yugoslavia	16.800	17.233	18.867	13.900	17.867	17.633	102.300
33	Eino Tukiainen	Finland	16.600	17.667	17.234	15.566	16.767	18.200	102.034
34	Vratislav Petráček	Czechoslovakia	16.767	15.866	18.034	16.800	18.166	16.333	101.966
35	Lajos Tóth	Hungary	15.667	18.367	16.433	14.633	18.434	18.333	101.867
36	Egidio Armelloni	Italy	16.634	18.567	16.200	16.900	16.200	17.100	101.601
37	Danilo Fioravanti	Italy	17.233	17.800	16.600	18.067	15.600	16.167	101.467
38	Jindrich Tintěra	Czechoslovakia	16.434	16.467	17.234	17.600	17.266	16.400	101.401
39	Franco Tognini	Italy	17.367	17.066	16.866	17.367	16.933	15.667	101.266
40	Emanuel Löffler	Czechoslovakia	18.100	17.300	18.233	15.567	17.067	14.967	101.234
41	Nicolo Tronci	Italy	17.033	17.934	17.700	14.667	17.333	15.933	100.600
42	Otello Ternelli	Italy	16.866	18.100	16.066	16.433	15.500	17.533	100.498
43	Yoshitaka Takeda	Japan	16.966	15.200	15.700	17.200	17.667	17.733	100.466
44	Metty Logelin	Luxembourg	16.167	17.467	17.166	14.333	17.100	18.200	100.433
45	Jey Kugeler	Luxembourg	15.900	15.700	17.867	17.200	16.834	16.567	100.068
46	Miroslav Forte	Yugoslavia	15.900	16.767	16.700	17.934	16.466	15.433	99.200
47	Miklos Péter	Hungary	17.033	14.534	16.100	17.133	18.167	16.067	99.034
48	Frank Cumiskey	United States	14.500	18.100	14.234	16.667	16.900	18.600	99.001
49	Armand Walter	France	16.100	16.300	16.233	16.667	15.733	17.900	98.933
50	Gottfried Hermann	Austria	17.367	17.866	11.667	15.233	17.200	18.600	97.933
51	Gábor Kecskeméti	Hungary	16.733	13.866	18.100	15.367	16.800	16.900	97.766
52	Armand Solbach	France	16.133	17.000	16.533	14.800	16.133	17.034	97.633
53	Lucien Masset	France	17.500	15.600	16.566	15.800	16.167	15.600	97.233
54	Hikoroku Arimoto	Japan	17.166	16.434	16.400	16.633	14.133	15.666	96.432
55	Robert Herold	France	15.867	16.400	15.400	15.534	16.600	16.367	96.168
56	Karl Pannos	Austria	15.400	16.500	12.000	16.967	16.767	18.300	95.934
56	Joze Vadnov	Yugoslavia	16.300	15.367	16.067	17.634	15.333	15.233	95.934
58	Ernst Winter	Germany	17.633	17.433	16.167	17.900	16.500	10.133	95.766
59	Antoine Schildwein	France	14.900	14.567	17.700	16.267	15.933	16.266	95.633
60	Yoshio Miyake	Japan	14.733	14.600	15.400	16.333	16.467	17.600	95.133
61	Janez Pristov	Yugoslavia	15.333	16.233	15.966	16.933	14.667	15.800	94.933
62	Maurice Rousseau	France	14.233	16.967	17.166	15.200	16.167	14.933	94.666
63	Dimitrije Merzlikin	Yugoslavia	16.500	13.034	16.667	14.800	15.607	17.900	94.568
64	István Sárkány	Hungary	15.600	13.866	17.200	17.200	14.466	16.233	94.565
65	Fred Meyer	United States	15.700	18.166	11.567	16.700	15.767	16.600	94.500
66	Neno Mirchev	Bulgaria	16.300	12.800	16.467	17.300	14.133	16.933	93.933
67	George Wheeler	United States	17.367	12.566	13.434	17.433	17.100	15.967	93.867
68	Hiroshi Nosaka	Japan	15.233	17.100	15.133	13.533	17.533	15.266	93.798
69	Bohumil Povejšil	Czechoslovakia	17.333	9.466	15.767	16.766	16.834	17.600	93.766
70	Paul Masino	France	16.033	12.434	17.933	15.933	15.134	16.100	93.567
71	József Sarlós	Hungary	15.533	13.466	17.533	15.400	14.600	16.600	93.132
72	Kiichiro Toyama	Japan	14.766	14.833	17.000	15.833	15.767	14.500	92.699
73	Dokan Sone	Japan	17.233	15.967	16.700	15.966	13.133	13.300	92.299
74	August Sturm	Austria	15.166	14.767	11.800	16.300	15.833	18.167	92.033
75	József Hegedüs	Hungary	15.500	18.033	16.866	13.500	15.233	12.866	91.998
76	Fujio Kakuta	Japan	15.066	15.400	14.300	15.600	14.433	16.500	91.299
77	Chet Phillips	United States	16.933	13.333	13.134	15.933	17.400	14.000	90.733
78	Boris Gregorka	Yugoslavia	14.400	15.600	14.300	16.433	13.733	15.767	90.233
79	Hiroshi Matsunobu	Japan	16.266	15.067	14.100	14.267	14.833	15.534	90.067
80	Gyözö Mogyorossy	Hungary	15.267	15.500	14.666	13.400	15.733	15.400	89.965
81	Pius Hollenstein	Austria	16.200	16.200	11.934	15.033	14.100	16.066	89.533
82	Artie Pitt	United States	14.466	14.900	14.700	15.233	13.567	16.200	89.066
83	Frank Haubold	United States	14.833	16.034	13.000	15.033	14.100	15.133	88.133
84	Jos Romersa	Luxembourg	14.667	12.733	15.033	16.067	14.034	14.967	87.501
85	Al Jochim	United States	16.033	14.267	16.334	13.766	11.334	15.133	86.867
86	Jean Aubry	France	15.567	13.300	15.900	14.067	13.900	13.700	86.434
87	Adolf Scheffknecht	Austria	15.167	13.200	10.366	14.634	14.033	17.667	85.067
88	Leopold Redl	Austria	16.900	12.633	14.667	16.133	9.467	15.233	85.033
89	Franz Swoboda	Austria	14.200	14.434	10.500	16.400	13.267	15.766	84.567
90	Kenny Griffin	United States	14.867	10.567	15.400	15.134	15.833	12.000	83.801
91	Robert Pranz	Austria	15.667	13.567	12.666	10.434	13.867	14.533	80.734
92	Franz Haupert	Luxembourg	13.167	13.666	14.466	14.900	10.866	11.300	78.365
93	Georgi Dimitrov	Bulgaria	14.300	5.334	13.733	16.500	13.300	14.100	77.267
94	Marcel Leineweber	Luxembourg	13.867	12.000	11.534	14.733	11.667	12.066	75.867
95	Willy Klein	Luxembourg	13.466	12.400	12.400	14.233	13.100	9.067	74.666
96	Yovcho Khristov	Bulgaria	13.300	10.700	13.934	13.800	13.100	9.600	74.434
97	Francisc Draghici	Romania	12.400	8.733	14.567	15.466	9.800	12.533	73.499
98	Ivan Chureshki	Bulgaria	13.300	7.334	14.867	14.733	10.566	10.800	71.600
99	Pando Sidov	Bulgaria	13.500	10.100	13.834	11.900	9.500	10.333	69.167
100	Jos Cillien	Luxembourg	14.700	11.833	12.267	9.067	12.767	7.833	68.467
101	Lyuben Obretenov	Bulgaria	13.600	9.000	10.866	13.600	11.033	7.833	65.932
102	Iosif Matusec	Romania	10.467	9.500	11.567	9.000	10.000	9.166	59.700
103	Remus Ludu	Romania	10.633	11.966	11.367	8.533	7.767	8.533	58.799
104	Andrei Abraham	Romania	12.500	10.033	10.700	6.400	11.667	7.400	58.700
105	Alexandru Dan	Romania	11.900	9.367	10.334	8.166	10.166	7.933	57.866
106	Ivan Stoychev	Bulgaria	11.833	9.800	12.900	7.200	7.567	7.567	56.867
107	Iohan Schmidt	Romania	12.634	8.500	6.734	5.633	8.200	10.500	52.201
108	Ion Albert	Romania	9.833	9.900	8.900	8.100	8.766	5.567	51.066
109	Vasile Moldovan	Romania	4.233	3.567	4.667	11.667	4.400	2.500	31.034
110	Mathias Erang	Luxembourg	—	—	7.167	8.333	6.167	5.333	27.000
111	Romeo Neri	Italy	8.967	8.567	8.733	—	—	—	26.267
