= Gymnastics at the 1936 Summer Olympics – Men's floor =

Men's floor at the Games of the XI Olympiad
- Venue: Waldbühne
- Date: 10–11 August 1936
- Competitors: 110 from 14 nations
- Winning score: 18.666

Medalists
1st place, gold medalist(s)		Georges Miez	Switzerland
2nd place, silver medalist(s)		Josef Walter	Switzerland
3rd place, bronze medalist(s)		Konrad Frey	Germany
3rd place, bronze medalist(s)		Eugen Mack	Switzerland

The men's floor (or "free") competition at the 1936 Summer Olympics was held at the Waldbühne on 10 and 11 August. It was the second appearance of the event, introduced in 1932.

== Competition format ==
The gymnastics format returned to the aggregation format used in 1928 but not in 1932. Each nation entered a team of eight gymnasts (Bulgaria had only 7). All entrants in the gymnastics competitions (Frang of Luxembourg did not compete in the floor exercise) performed both a compulsory exercise and a voluntary exercise, with the scores summed to give a final total. The scores in the floor exercise were added to the other apparatus scores to give individual all-around scores; the top six individual scores on each team were summed to give a team all-around score. No separate finals were contested.

== Results ==
Rank	Gymnast	Nation	Compulsory	Voluntary	Total
1st place, gold medalist(s)	Georges Miez	Switzerland	9.333	9.333	18.666
2nd place, silver medalist(s)	Josef Walter	Switzerland	9.233	9.267	18.500
3rd place, bronze medalist(s)	Konrad Frey	Germany	9.233	9.233	18.466
3rd place, bronze medalist(s)	Eugen Mack	Switzerland	9.233	9.233	18.466
5	Matthias Volz	Germany	9.133	9.233	18.366
6	Willi Stadel	Germany	9.200	9.100	18.300
6	Walter Steffens	Germany	9.167	9.133	18.300
8	Martti Uosikkinen	Finland	9.200	9.067	18.267
9	Heikki Savolainen	Finland	9.267	8.933	18.200
10	Alfred Schwarzmann	Germany	9.033	9.133	18.166
11	Alois Hudec	Czechoslovakia	9.300	8.833	18.133
12	Emanuel Löffler	Czechoslovakia	9.067	9.033	18.100
13	Jan Gajdoš	Czechoslovakia	9.233	8.767	18.000
13	Walter Beck	Switzerland	9.167	8.833	18.000
15	Eduard Steinemann	Switzerland	8.967	8.833	17.800
15	Esa Seeste	Finland	8.867	8.933	17.800
17	Franz Beckert	Germany	8.967	8.800	17.767
18	Albert Bachmann	Switzerland	8.867	8.800	17.667
19	Ernst Winter	Germany	8.700	8.933	17.633
20	Walter Bach	Switzerland	8.967	8.633	17.600
21	Lucien Masset	France	8.900	8.600	17.500
22	Michael Reusch	Switzerland	8.600	8.800	17.400
23	Franco Tognini	Italy	8.867	8.500	17.367
23	George Wheeler	United States	8.867	8.500	17.367
23	Gottfried Hermann	Austria	8.467	8.900	17.367
23	István Pelle	Hungary	8.200	9.167	17.367
27	Ilmari Pakarinen	Finland	8.933	8.433	17.366
28	Josip Primožič	Yugoslavia	9.067	8.267	17.334
29	Bohumil Povejšil	Czechoslovakia	9.100	8.233	17.333
30	Danilo Fioravanti	Italy	9.000	8.233	17.233
30	Dokan Sone	Japan	8.933	8.300	17.233
30	Oreste Capuzzo	Italy	8.700	8.533	17.233
33	Savino Guglielmetti	Italy	9.167	8.000	17.167
33	Aleksanteri Saarvala	Finland	8.400	8.767	17.167
35	Hikoroku Arimoto	Japan	8.533	8.633	17.166
36	Jaroslav Kollinger	Czechoslovakia	8.967	8.167	17.134
37	Innozenz Stangl	Germany	8.500	8.633	17.133
37	Einari Teräsvirta	Finland	8.133	9.000	17.133
39	Nicolo Tronci	Italy	8.300	8.733	17.033
39	Miklos Péter	Hungary	8.000	9.033	17.033
41	Mauri Nyberg-Noroma	Finland	8.600	8.367	16.967
42	Yoshitaka Takeda	Japan	8.633	8.333	16.966
43	Chet Phillips	United States	8.333	8.600	16.933
44	Leopold Redl	Austria	7.833	9.067	16.900
45	Otello Ternelli	Italy	8.633	8.233	16.866
46	Jan Sládek	Czechoslovakia	8.767	8.033	16.800
46	Leon Štukelj	Yugoslavia	8.233	8.567	16.800
48	Vratislav Petráček	Czechoslovakia	8.900	7.867	16.767
49	Gábor Kecskeméti	Hungary	8.233	8.500	16.733
50	Egidio Armelloni	Italy	8.467	8.167	16.634
51	Eino Tukiainen	Finland	8.067	8.533	16.600
52	Dimitrije Merzlikin	Yugoslavia	8.900	7.600	16.500
53	Jindrich Tintěra	Czechoslovakia	8.567	7.867	16.434
54	Neno Mirchev	Bulgaria	9.033	7.267	16.300
54	Joze Vadnov	Yugoslavia	8.533	7.767	16.300
56	Hiroshi Matsunobu	Japan	8.633	7.633	16.266
56	Konrad Grilc	Yugoslavia	8.533	7.733	16.266
58	Pius Hollenstein	Austria	8.067	8.133	16.200
59	Metty Logelin	Luxembourg	8.500	7.667	16.167
60	Armand Solbach	France	8.833	7.300	16.133
61	Armand Walter	France	8.500	7.600	16.100
62	Paul Masino	France	8.733	7.300	16.033
62	Al Jochim	United States	8.533	7.500	16.033
64	Jey Kugeler	Luxembourg	8.400	7.500	15.900
64	Miroslav Forte	Yugoslavia	8.300	7.600	15.900
66	Robert Herold	France	8.667	7.200	15.867
67	Fred Meyer	United States	8.400	7.300	15.700
68	Robert Pranz	Austria	7.867	7.800	15.667
68	Lajos Tóth	Hungary	7.067	8.600	15.667
70	István Sárkány	Hungary	7.300	8.300	15.600
71	Jean Aubry	France	8.000	7.567	15.567
72	József Sarlós	Hungary	7.000	8.533	15.533
73	József Hegedüs	Hungary	7.200	8.300	15.500
74	Karl Pannos	Austria	7.533	7.867	15.400
75	Janez Pristov	Yugoslavia	8.034	7.300	15.334
76	Gyözö Mogyorossy	Hungary	6.867	8.400	15.267
77	Hiroshi Nosaka	Japan	7.633	7.600	15.233
78	Adolf Scheffknecht	Austria	7.700	7.467	15.167
79	August Sturm	Austria	7.533	7.633	15.166
80	Fujio Kakuta	Japan	8.333	6.733	15.066
81	Antoine Schildwein	France	7.467	7.433	14.900
82	Kenny Griffin	United States	7.700	7.167	14.867
83	Frank Haubold	United States	7.900	6.933	14.833
84	Kiichiro Toyama	Japan	7.833	6.933	14.766
85	Yoshio Miyake	Japan	7.800	6.933	14.733
86	Jos Cillien	Luxembourg	7.633	7.067	14.700
87	Jos Romersa	Luxembourg	7.300	7.367	14.667
88	Frank Cumiskey	United States	7.133	7.367	14.500
89	Artie Pitt	United States	7.433	7.033	14.466
90	Boris Gregorka	Yugoslavia	7.367	7.033	14.400
91	Georgi Dimitrov	Bulgaria	7.400	6.900	14.300
92	Maurice Rousseau	France	7.433	6.800	14.233
93	Franz Swoboda	Austria	6.767	7.433	14.200
94	Marcel Leineweber	Luxembourg	6.900	6.967	13.867
95	Lyuben Obretenov	Bulgaria	7.267	6.333	13.600
96	Pando Sidov	Bulgaria	7.100	6.400	13.500
97	Willy Klein	Luxembourg	6.633	6.833	13.466
98	Yovcho Khristov	Bulgaria	7.100	6.200	13.300
98	Ivan Chureshki	Bulgaria	6.500	6.800	13.300
100	Franz Haupert	Luxembourg	6.567	6.600	13.167
101	Iohan Schmidt	Romania	5.667	6.967	12.634
102	Andrei Abraham	Romania	5.800	6.700	12.500
103	Francisc Draghici	Romania	5.667	6.733	12.400
104	Alexandru Dan	Romania	5.233	6.667	11.900
105	Ivan Stoychev	Bulgaria	6.533	5.300	11.833
106	Remus Ludu	Romania	5.133	5.500	10.633
107	Iosif Matusec	Romania	4.700	5.767	10.467
108	Ion Albert	Romania	4.000	5.833	9.833
–	Romeo Neri	Italy	8.967	–	DNF
–	Vasile Moldovan	Romania	4.233	–	DNF
