= Gymnastics at the 1936 Summer Olympics – Men's artistic team all-around =

Men's artistic team all-around at the Games of the XI Olympiad
- Venue: Waldbühne
- Date: 10–11 August
- Competitors: 111 from 14 nations
- Winning score: 675.430

Medalists
1st place, gold medalist(s)		Franz Beckert; Konrad Frey; Alfred Schwarzmann; Willi Stadel; Inno Stangl; Walter Steffens; Matthias Volz; Ernst Winter	Germany
2nd place, silver medalist(s)		Walter Bach; Albert Bachmann; Walter Beck; Eugen Mack; Georges Miez; Michael Reusch; Eduard Steinemann; Josef Walter	Switzerland
3rd place, bronze medalist(s)		Mauri Nyberg-Noroma; Veikko Pakarinen; Aleksanteri Saarvala; Heikki Savolainen; Esa Seeste; Einari Teräsvirta; Eino Tukiainen; Martti Uosikkinen	Finland

The men's artistic team all-around competition at the 1936 Summer Olympics was held at the Waldbühne on 10 and 11 August. It was the eighth appearance of the event.

== Competition format ==
The gymnastics format returned to the aggregation format used in 1928 but not in 1932. Each nation entered a team of eight gymnasts (Bulgaria had only 7). All entrants in the gymnastics competitions performed both a compulsory exercise and a voluntary exercise, with the scores summed to give a final total. The scores in each of the six apparatus competitions were added together to give individual all-around scores; the top six individual scoring gymnasts on each team were summed to give a team all-around score – the scores of any other gymnasts competing on that team were not used at all towards the team total. No separate finals were contested.

It is also worth noting that the Individual All-Around Champion from the preceding Olympics, Romeo Neri, was injured and unable to fully help his 5th-place finishing Italian team

== Results ==
Rank	Nation	Gymnasts	Exercise results																					Team total
Rank	Nation	Gymnasts	Parallel bars			Vault (gymnastics)			Pommel horse			Rings (gymnastics)			Floor (gymnastics)			Horizontal bar			Individual Totals			Team total
Rank	Nation	Gymnasts	C	V	Total	C	V	Total	C	V	Total	C	V	Total	C	V	Total	C	V	Total	Compulsory Total	Voluntary Total	Grand Total	Team total
1st place, gold medalist(s)	Germany	Alfred Schwarzmann	9.50	9.467	18.967	9.433	9.767	19.20	9.50	9.50	19.00	9.167	9.367	18.534	9.033	9.133	18.166	9.700	9.533	19.233	56.333	56.767	113.100	657.480
1st place, gold medalist(s)	Germany	Konrad Frey	9.500	9.567	19.067	8.333	9.333	17.666	9.800	9.533	19.333	8.533	9.200	17.733	9.233	9.233	18.466	9.700	9.567	19.267	55.099	56.433	111.532	657.480
1st place, gold medalist(s)	Germany	Matthias Volz	7.933	9.100	17.033	8.967	9.500	18.467	9.433	9.333	18.766	9.100	9.567	18.667	9.133	9.233	18.366	9.300	9.500	18.800	53.866	56.233	110.099	657.480
1st place, gold medalist(s)	Germany	Willi Stadel	9.033	9.100	18.133	9.100	8.933	18.033	9.467	9.400	18.867	8.433	8.533	16.966	9.200	9.100	18.300	9.400	9.300	18.700	54.633	54.366	108.999	657.480
1st place, gold medalist(s)	Germany	Franz Beckert	8.800	9.133	17.933	8.333	9.067	17.400	9.467	9.067	18.534	9.033	9.500	18.533	8.967	8.800	17.767	7.700	9.333	17.033	52.300	54.900	107.250	657.480
1st place, gold medalist(s)	Germany	Walter Steffens	7.467	9.367	16.834	8.867	8.367	17.234	9.500	9.533	19.033	8.033	8.100	16.133	9.167	9.133	18.300	9.333	9.633	18.966	52.367	54.133	106.500	657.480
1st place, gold medalist(s)	Germany	Innozenz Stangl	9.333	6.400	15.733	8.367	9.300	17.667	9.000	8.900	17.900	8.600	8.767	17.367	8.500	8.633	17.133	9.400	9.767	19.167	53.200	51.767	~~104.967~~	657.480
1st place, gold medalist(s)	Germany	Ernst Winter	7.700	8.800	16.500	8.433	9.467	17.900	7.833	9.600	17.433	7.967	8.200	16.167	8.700	8.933	17.633	9.133	1.000	10.133	49.766	46.000	~~95.766~~	657.480
1st place, gold medalist(s)	Germany	Total	69.266	70.934	140.200	69.833	73.734	143.567	74.000	74.866	148.866	68.866	71.234	140.100	71.933	72.198	144.131	73.666	67.633	141.299	427.564	430.599	858.163	657.480
2nd place, silver medalist(s)	Switzerland	Eugen Mack	9.267	9.567	18.834	9.267	9.700	18.967	9.500	9.667	19.167	8.733	9.267	18.000	9.233	9.233	18.466	9.300	9.600	18.900	55.300	57.034	112.334	654.802
2nd place, silver medalist(s)	Switzerland	Michael Reusch	9.567	9.467	19.034	8.833	9.433	18.266	9.600	9.400	19.000	9.067	9.367	18.434	8.600	8.800	17.400	9.133	9.433	18.566	54.800	55.900	110.700	654.802
2nd place, silver medalist(s)	Switzerland	Eduard Steinemann	9.200	9.300	19.034	8.833	9.433	18.266	9.333	8.833	18.166	8.300	8.867	17.167	8.967	8.833	17.800	9.333	9.467	18.800	54.133	54.500	108.633	654.802
2nd place, silver medalist(s)	Switzerland	Walter Bach	9.333	9.400	18.733	9.233	9.167	18.400	9.633	9.400	19.033	7.667	8.533	16.200	8.967	8.633	17.600	8.833	9.500	18.333	53.666	54.633	108.299	654.802
2nd place, silver medalist(s)	Switzerland	Albert Bachmann	9.100	9.167	18.267	8.267	9.700	17.967	9.500	9.567	19.067	8.300	8.900	17.200	8.867	8.800	17.667	8.167	9.167	17.334	52.201	55.301	107.502	654.802
2nd place, silver medalist(s)	Switzerland	Georges Miez	8.567	8.933	17.500	9.067	9.167	18.234	9.100	9.467	18.567	7.233	8.667	15.900	9.333	9.333	18.666	9.167	9.300	18.467	52.467	54.867	107.344	654.802
2nd place, silver medalist(s)	Switzerland	Josef Walter	9.033	9.233	18.266	8.667	9.567	18.234	8.200	9.500	17.700	6.900	8.267	15.167	9.233	9.267	18.500	7.867	9.033	16.900	49.900	54.867	~~104.767~~	654.802
2nd place, silver medalist(s)	Switzerland	Walter Beck	8.900	8.800	17.700	8.700	9.667	18.367	8.467	8.067	16.534	7.733	8.233	15.966	9.167	8.833	18.000	9.167	9.000	18.167	52.134	52.600	~~104.734~~	654.802
2nd place, silver medalist(s)	Switzerland	Total	72.967	73.867	146.834	71.034	75.601	146.635	73.333	73.901	147.234	53.933	70.101	134.034	72.367	71.732	144.099	70.967	74.500	145.467	424.601	439.702	864.303	654.802
3rd place, bronze medalist(s)	Finland	Martti Uosikkinen	9.000	9.433	18.433	9.167	9.133	18.300	9.533	9.533	19.066	8.267	9.367	17.634	9.200	9.067	18.267	9.333	9.667	19.000	54.500	56.200	110.700	638.468
3rd place, bronze medalist(s)	Finland	Heikki Savolainen	9.133	9.500	18.633	8.133	8.867	17.000	9.267	8.133	17.400	9.233	9.167	18.400	9.267	8.933	18.200	9.400	9.733	19.133	54.433	54.333	108.766	638.468
3rd place, bronze medalist(s)	Finland	Mauri Nyberg-Noroma	8.867	9.267	18.134	8.600	8.600	17.200	9.200	8.900	18.100	8.767	9.033	17.800	8.600	8.367	16.967	9.000	9.600	18.600	53.034	53.767	106.801	638.468
3rd place, bronze medalist(s)	Finland	Aleksanteri Saarvala	9.267	8.767	18.034	7.800	7.367	15.167	8.500	9.467	17.967	8.600	8.933	17.533	8.400	8.767	17.167	9.700	9.667	19.367	52.267	52.968	105.235	638.468
3rd place, bronze medalist(s)	Finland	Esa Seeste	8.667	7.767	16.434	8.133	8.967	17.100	8.367	9.000	17.367	8.233	8.500	16.733	8.867	8.933	17.800	9.067	9.433	18.500	51.334	52.600	103.934	638.468
3rd place, bronze medalist(s)	Finland	Ilmari Pakarinen	6.633	9.033	15.666	7.567	8.533	16.100	9.000	9.233	18.233	8.300	8.300	16.600	8.933	8.433	17.366	9.567	9.500	19.067	50.000	53.032	103.032	638.468
3rd place, bronze medalist(s)	Finland	Einari Teräsvirta	8.767	8.733	17.500	8.167	8.367	16.534	7.500	8.833	16.333	8.300	8.2333	16.633	8.133	9.000	17.133	9.300	9.433	18.733	50.167	52.699	~~102.866~~	638.468
3rd place, bronze medalist(s)	Finland	Eino Tukiainen	8.000	8.767	16.767	8.633	6.933	15.566	8.367	9.300	17.677	8.467	8.767	17.234	8.067	8.533	16.600	9.033	9.167	18.200	50.567	51.467	~~102.034~~	638.468
3rd place, bronze medalist(s)	Finland	Total	68.334	71.267	139.601	66.200	66.767	132.967	69.734	72.399	142.133	68.167	70.400	138.567	69.467	70.033	139.500	74.400	76.200	150.600	416.302	427.066	843.368	638.468
4	Czechoslovakia	Alois Hudec	9.433	9.533	18.966	8.667	9.200	17.867	9.233	8.733	17.966	9.633	9.800	19.433	9.300	8.833	18.133	9.367	9.467	18.834	55.563	55.566	111.199	625.763
4	Czechoslovakia	Jaroslav Kollinger	8.933	9.033	18.966	8.633	8.667	17.300	8.133	9.000	17.133	9.000	9.433	18.433	8.967	8.167	17.134	7.867	8.900	16.767	51.533	53.200	104.733	625.763
4	Czechoslovakia	Jan Sládek	8.433	8.633	17.066	8.700	8.533	17.233	8.900	9.000	17.900	8.000	9.033	17.033	8.767	8.033	16.800	8.400	8.967	17.367	51.200	52.199	103.399	625.763
4	Czechoslovakia	Jan Gajdoš	8.533	8.933	17.466	8.733	8.833	17.566	8.400	7.767	16.167	8.633	9.033	17.666	9.233	8.767	18.000	8.500	7.700	16.200	52.032	51.033	103.065	625.763
4	Czechoslovakia	Vratislav Petráček	9.233	8.933	18.166	8.100	8.700	16.800	7.933	7.933	15.866	8.767	9.267	18.034	8.900	7.867	16.767	7.733	8.600	16.333	50.666	51.300	101.966	625.763
4	Czechoslovakia	Jindřich Tintěra	8.533	8.733	17.266	8.867	8.733	17.600	7.967	8.500	16.467	8.367	8.867	17.234	8.567	7.867	16.434	8.100	8.300	16.400	50.401	51.000	101.401	625.763
4	Czechoslovakia	Emanuel Löffler	8.167	8.900	17.067	7.067	8.500	15.567	9.300	8.000	17.300	8.933	9.300	18.233	9.067	9.033	18.100	6.167	8.800	14.967	48.701	52.533	~~101.234~~	625.763
4	Czechoslovakia	Bohumil Povejšil	8.867	7.967	16.834	8.833	7.933	16.766	8.133	1.333	9.466	7.167	8.600	15.767	9.100	8.233	17.333	8.833	8.767	17.600	50.933	42.833	~~93.766~~	625.763
4	Czechoslovakia	Total	70.132	70.665	140.797	67.600	69.099	136.699	67.999	60.266	128.265	68.500	73.333	141.833	71.901	56.800	138.701	34.967	59.501	134.468	411.099	409.664	820.763	625.763
5	Italy	Savino Guglielmetti	9.033	9.433	18.466	8.867	9.167	18.034	8.633	9.500	18.133	8.833	9.133	17.966	9.167	8.000	17.167	8.433	9.500	17.933	52.966	54.733	107.699	615.133
5	Italy	Oreste Capuzzo	7.533	8.567	18.100	8.633	6.333	14.966	8.967	9.467	18.434	8.967	9.400	18.367	8.700	8.533	17.233	8.567	8.833	17.400	51.367	51.133	102.500	615.133
5	Italy	Egidio Armelloni	7.300	8.900	16.200	8.367	8.533	16.900	9.100	9.467	18.567	7.200	9.000	16.200	8.467	8.167	16.634	9.167	7.933	17.100	49.601	52.000	101.601	615.133
5	Italy	Danilo Fioravanti	7.567	8.033	15.600	8.967	9.100	18.067	8.467	9.333	17.800	8.133	8.467	16.600	9.000	8.233	17.233	7.700	8.467	16.167	49.834	51.633	101.467	615.133
5	Italy	Franco Tognini	8.133	8.800	16.933	8.500	8.867	17.367	8.233	8.833	17.066	8.333	8.533	16.866	8.867	8.500	17.367	8.267	7.400	15.667	50.333	50.933	101.266	615.133
5	Italy	Nicolò Tronci	8.433	8.900	17.333	8.100	6.587	14.677	8.767	9.167	17.934	8.667	9.033	17.700	8.300	8.733	17.033	7.500	8.433	15.933	49.767	50.833	100.600	615.133
5	Italy	Otello Ternelli	7.333	8.167	15.500	7.800	8.633	16.433	9.033	9.067	18.100	7.733	8.333	16.066	8.633	8.233	16.866	8.633	8.900	17.533	49.615	51.333	~~100.498~~	615.133
5	Italy	Romeo Neri	injured	-	-	-	-	-	8.567	injured	8.567	8.733	injured	8.733	8.967	injured	8.967	injured	-	-	26.267	-	~~26.267~~	615.133
5	Italy	Total	55.332	60.800	116.132	59.234	57.200	116.434	69.767	64.834	134.601	66.599	61.899	128.498	70.101	58.399	128.500	58.267	59.466	117.733	379.300	362.598	741.898	615.133
6	Yugoslavia	Konrad Grilc	9.133	7.833	16.966	9.200	8.900	18.100	8.400	8.733	17.133	8.933	7.867	16.800	8.533	7.733	16.266	9.367	9.000	18.367	53.566	50.066	103.632	598.366
6	Yugoslavia	Josip Primožič	8.700	8.333	17.533	8.833	8.300	17.133	8.167	8.533	16.700	8.300	8.000	16.300	9.067	8.267	17.344	9.034	8.333	17.367	52.101	50.266	102.367	598.366
6	Yugoslavia	Leon Štukelj	9.067	8.800	17.867	8.233	5.677	13.900	8.233	9.000	17.233	9.467	9.400	18.867	8.233	8.567	16.800	8.433	9.200	17.633	51.666	50.634	102.300	598.366
6	Yugoslavia	Miroslav Forte	8.833	7.633	16.466	9.067	8.867	17.934	8.000	8.767	16.767	8.633	8.067	16.700	8.300	7.600	15.900	6.500	8.933	15.433	49.333	49.867	99.200	598.366
6	Yugoslavia	Jože Vadnov	7.500	7.833	15.333	9.067	8.567	17.634	7.967	7.400	15.367	8.600	7.467	16.067	8.533	7.767	16.300	6.733	8.500	15.233	48.400	47.534	95.934	598.366
6	Yugoslavia	Janez Pristov	8.000	6.667	14.667	8.500	8.433	16.933	8.300	7.933	16.233	8.133	7.833	15.966	8.034	7.300	15.333	7.800	8.000	15.800	48.767	46.166	94.933	598.366
6	Yugoslavia	Dimitrije Merzlikin	8.867	6.800	15.607	5.667	9.133	14.800	7.367	5.667	13.034	8.567	8.100	16.667	8.900	7.600	16.500	9.300	8.600	17.900	48.668	45.900	~~94.568~~	598.366
6	Yugoslavia	Boris Gregorka	6.700	7.033	13.733	8.233	8.200	16.433	8.200	7.400	15.600	6.933	7.367	14.300	7.367	7.033	14.400	7.000	8.767	15.767	44.433	45.800	~~94.568~~	598.366
6	Yugoslavia	Total	66.800	61.432	128.232	66.800	66.067	132.867	64.634	63.433	128.067	67.566	64.101	131.667	66.967	61.867	128.834	64.137	69.333	133.500	396.934	386.233	783.167	598.366
7	Hungary	István Pelle	9.167	9.167	18.334	7.500	8.233	15.733	8.833	9.367	18.200	8.533	8.933	17.466	8.200	9.167	17.367	9.133	9.333	18.466	51.366	54.200	105.566	591.930
7	Hungary	Lajos Tóth	8.867	9.567	18.434	6.033	8.600	14.633	9.300	9.067	18.367	7.500	8.933	16.433	7.067	8.600	15.667	9.033	9.300	18.333	47.800	54.067	101.867	591.930
7	Hungary	Miklos Péter	9.100	9.067	18.167	7.900	9.233	17.133	5.267	9.267	14.534	7.433	8.667	16.100	8.000	9.033	17.033	6.900	9.167	16.067	44.600	54.434	99.034	591.930
7	Hungary	Gábor Kecskeméti	7.733	9.067	16.800	7.500	7.867	15.367	6.333	7.533	13.866	8.867	9.233	18.100	8.233	8.500	16.733	8.233	8.667	16.900	46.899	50.867	97.766	591.930
7	Hungary	István Sárkány	6.333	8.133	14.466	8.700	8.500	17.200	6.433	7.433	13.866	8.167	9.033	17.200	7.300	8.300	15.600	8.433	7.800	16.233	45.366	49.199	94.565	591.930
7	Hungary	József Sarlós	5.467	9.133	14.600	6.933	8.467	15.400	7.433	6.033	13.466	8.433	9.100	17.533	7.000	8.533	15.533	8.000	8.600	16.600	43.266	49.866	93.132	591.930
7	Hungary	József Hegedüs	7.200	8.033	15.233	6.833	6.667	13.500	8.833	9.200	18.033	7.933	8.933	16.866	7.200	8.300	15.500	4.333	8.533	12.866	42.332	49.666	~~91.998~~	591.930
7	Hungary	Gyözö Mogyorossy	7.733	8.000	15.733	8.400	5.000	13.400	6.733	8.767	15.500	6.233	8.433	14.666	6.867	8.400	15.267	7.300	8.100	15.400	43.266	46.699	~~89.965~~	591.930
7	Hungary	Total	61.600	70.167	131.767	59.799	62.567	122.366	59.165	66.667	125.832	63.099	71.265	134.364	59.867	68.833	128.700	61.365	69.500	130.865	364.895	408.998	773.893	591.930
8	France	Armand Walter	8.033	7.700	15.733	8.000	8.667	16.667	8.100	8.200	16.300	7.733	8.500	16.233	8.500	7.600	16.100	8.533	9.367	17.900	48.899	50.034	98.933	580.266
8	France	Armand Solbach	8.133	8.000	16.133	8.067	6.733	14.800	8.233	8.767	17.000	8.000	8.533	16.533	8.833	7.300	16.133	7.667	9.367	17.034	48.933	48.700	97.633	580.266
8	France	Lucien Masset	8.167	8.000	16.167	7.567	8.233	15.800	7.233	8.367	15.600	8.033	8.533	16.566	8.900	8.600	17.500	6.633	8.967	15.600	46.533	50.700	97.233	580.266
8	France	Robert Herold	8.233	8.367	16.600	7.867	7.667	15.534	7.467	8.933	16.400	7.333	8.067	15.400	8.667	7.200	15.867	7.500	8.867	16.367	47.067	49.101	96.168	580.266
8	France	Antoine Schildwein	8.333	7.600	15.933	7.900	8.367	16.267	7.600	6.967	14.567	8.767	8.933	17.700	7.467	7.433	14.900	7.333	8.933	16.266	47.400	48.233	95.633	580.266
8	France	Maurice Rousseau	8.067	8.100	16.167	7.200	8.000	15.200	8.367	8.600	16.967	8.733	8.433	17.166	7.433	6.800	14.233	58.833	9.100	14.933	45.633	49.033	94.666	580.266
8	France	Paul Masino	7.367	7.767	15.134	8.033	7.900	15.933	6.467	5.967	12.434	8.933	9.000	17.933	8.733	7.300	16.033	7.433	8.667	16.100	46.966	46.601	~~93.567~~	580.266
8	France	Jean Aubry	8.133	5.767	13.900	7.567	6.500	14.067	7.533	5.767	13.300	7.933	7.967	15.900	8.000	7.567	15.567	6.233	7.467	13.700	45.399	41.035	~~86.434~~	580.266
8	France	Total	64.466	61.301	125.767	62.201	62.067	124.268	61.000	61.568	122.568	65.465	67.966	133.431	66.533	59.800	126.333	57.165	70.735	127.900	376.830	383.437	760.267	580.266
9	Japan	Yoshitaka Takeda	8.800	8.867	17.667	8.667	8.533	17.200	7.400	7.800	15.200	7.367	8.333	15.700	8.633	8.333	16.966	9.000	6,.733	17.733	49.867	50.599	100.466	570.827
9	Japan	Hikoroku Arimoto	6.233	7.900	14.133	8.500	8.133	16.633	7.967	8.467	16.434	8.233	8.167	16.400	8.533	8.633	17.166	7.533	8.133	15.666	46.999	49.433	96.432	570.827
9	Japan	Yoshio Miyake	7.400	9.067	16.467	8.000	8.333	16.333	7.433	7.167	14.600	7.767	7.633	15.400	7.800	6.933	14.733	9.267	8.333	17.600	47.667	47.466	95.133	570.827
9	Japan	Hiroshi Nosaka	8.700	8.833	17.533	5.333	8.200	13.533	8.533	8.567	17.100	7.633	7.500	15.133	7.633	7.600	15.233	8.333	6.933	15.266	46.165	47.633	93.798	570.827
9	Japan	Kiichiro Toyama	8.200	7.567	15.767	8.000	7.833	15.833	7.633	7.200	14.833	8.133	8.867	17.000	7.833	6.933	14.766	7.500	7.000	14.500	47.299	45.400	92.699	570.827
9	Japan	Dokan Sone	5.800	7.333	13.133	7.933	8.033	15.966	8.200	7.767	15.967	8.467	8.233	16.700	8.933	8.300	17.233	9.333	4.000	13.333	48.633	43.666	92.299	570.827
9	Japan	Fujio Kakuta	6.500	7.933	14.433	7.433	8.167	15.600	8.100	7.300	15.400	6.600	7.700	14.300	8.333	6.733	15.066	9.100	7.400	16.500	46.066	45.233	~~91.299~~	570.827
9	Japan	Hiroshi Matsunobu	7.233	7.600	14.833	6.800	7.467	14.267	8.467	6.600	15.067	7.733	6.767	14.100	8.633	7.633	16.266	7.367	8.167	15.534	45.833	44.234	~~90.067~~	570.827
9	Japan	Total	58.866	65.100	123.966	60.666	64.699	125.365	63.733	60.868	124.601	61.533	63.200	124.733	66.311	61.098	124.429	67.400	58.699	126.099	378.529	373.664	752.193	570.827
10	United States	Frank Cumiskey	8.467	8.433	16.900	7.400	9.267	16.677	8.767	9.333	18.100	6.467	7.767	14.234	7.133	7.367	14.500	9.200	9.400	18.600	47.434	51.567	99.001	555.300
10	United States	Fred Meyer	7.767	8.000	15.767	7.933	8.767	16.700	9.033	9.133	18.166	5.600	5.967	11.567	8.400	7.300	15.700	7.467	9.133	16.600	46.200	48.300	94.500	555.300
10	United States	George Wheeler	8.667	8.433	17.100	8.333	9.100	17.433	8.233	4.333	12.566	6.767	6.677	13.434	8.867	8.500	17.367	7.200	8.767	15.967	48.067	45.800	93.867	555.300
10	United States	Chet Phillips	8.200	9.200	17.400	8.400	7.533	15.933	7.533	5.800	13.333	6.567	6.567	13.134	8.333	8.600	16.933	5.333	8.667	14.000	44.366	46.367	90.733	555.300
10	United States	Artie Pitt	8.367	5.200	13.567	7.100	8.133	15.233	8.133	6.767	14.900	7.467	7.233	14.700	7.433	7.033	14.466	7.000	9.200	16.200	45.500	43.566	89.066	555.300
10	United States	Frank Haubold	5.500	8.600	14.100	6.933	8.100	15.033	8.867	7.167	16.034	5.600	7.400	13.000	7.900	6.933	14.833	7.100	8.033	15.133	41.900	46.233	88.133	555.300
10	United States	Al Jochim	3.067	8.267	11.334	6.333	7.433	13.766	7.467	6.800	14.267	7.767	8.567	16.334	8.533	7.500	16.033	6.400	8.733	15.133	39.567	47.300	~~86.867~~	555.300
10	United States	Kenny Griffin	7.633	8.200	15.833	6.567	8.567	15.134	5.567	5.000	10.567	7.233	8.167	15.400	7.700	7.167	14.867	6.333	5.667	12.000	41.033	42.768	~~83.801~~	555.300
10	United States	Total	57.668	64.333	122.001	58.999	66.900	125.899	63.600	54.333	117.933	53.468	58.335	111.803	64.299	60.400	124.699	56.033	67.600	123.633	354.067	371.901	752.968	555.300
11	Austria	Gottfried Hermann	8.400	8.800	17.200	8.933	6.300	15.233	8.933	8.933	17.866	4.967	6.700	11.667	8.467	8.900	17.637	9.200	9.400	18.600	48.900	49.033	97.933	545.533
11	Austria	Karl Pannos	8.500	8.267	16.767	8.667	8.300	16.967	8.567	7.933	16.500	5.667	6.333	12.000	7.533	7.867	15.400	8.967	9.333	18.300	47.901	48.033	95.934	545.533
11	Austria	August Sturm	8.033	7.800	15.833	7.433	8.867	16.300	6.500	8.267	14.767	5.467	6.333	11.800	7.533	7.633	15.166	9.200	8.967	18.167	44.166	47.867	92.033	545.533
11	Austria	Pius Hollenstein	6.767	7.333	14.100	7.900	7.133	15.033	7.600	8.600	16.200	5.467	6.467	11.934	8.067	8.133	16.200	7.333	8.733	16.066	43.134	46.399	89.533	545.533
11	Austria	Adolf Scheffknecht	6.700	7.333	14.033	7.167	7.467	14.634	5.576	7.633	13.200	4.433	5.933	10.366	7.700	7.467	15.167	8.467	9.200	17.667	40.034	45.033	85.067	545.533
11	Austria	Leopold Redl	7.467	2.000	9.467	7.333	8.800	16.133	5.033	7.600	12.633	6.967	7.700	14.667	7.833	9.067	16.900	6.600	8.633	15.233	41.233	43.800	85.033	545.533
11	Austria	Franz Swoboda	5.967	7.300	13.267	8.200	8.200	16.400	6.667	7.767	14.434	4.000	6.500	10.500	6.767	7.433	14.200	7.133	8.633	15.766	38.734	45.833	~~84.567~~	545.533
11	Austria	Robert Pranz	6.767	7.100	13.867	5.667	4.767	10.434	5.900	7.667	13.567	6.233	6.433	12.666	7.867	7.800	15.667	6.233	8.300	14.533	38.667	42.067	~~80.734~~	545.533
11	Austria	Total	58.601	55.933	114.534	61.300	59.834	121.134	54.767	64.400	119.167	43.201	52.399	95.600	61.767	64.300	126.067	63.133	71.199	134.332	342.769	368.065	710.834	545.533
12	Luxembourg	Metty Logelin	8.400	8.700	17.100	7.000	7.333	14.333	8.667	8.800	17.467	8.533	8.633	17.166	8.500	7.667	16.167	9.133	9.067	18.200	50.233	50.200	100.433	516.900
12	Luxembourg	Jey Kugeler	8.067	8.767	16.834	8.433	8.767	17.200	7.967	7.733	15.700	8.700	9.167	17.867	8.400	7.500	15.900	7.267	9.300	16.567	48.834	51.234	100.068	516.900
12	Luxembourg	Jos Romersa	6.267	7.767	14.034	7.767	8.300	16.067	7.000	5.733	12.733	7.533	7.500	15.033	7.300	7.367	14.667	7.067	7.900	14.967	42.934	44.567	87.501	516.900
12	Luxembourg	Franz Haupert	4.133	6.733	10.866	7.667	7.233	14.900	7.333	6.333	13.666	7.533	6.933	14.466	6.567	6.600	13.167	3.333	7.967	11.300	36.566	41.799	78.365	516.900
12	Luxembourg	Marcel Leineweber	5.767	5.900	11.667	6.600	8.133	14.733	5.367	6.633	12.000	5.867	5.667	11.534	6.900	6.967	13.867	4.333	7.733	12.066	34.834	41.033	75.867	516.900
12	Luxembourg	Willy Klein	6.433	6.667	13.100	7.233	7.000	14.233	5.633	6.767	12.400	6.333	6.067	12.400	6.633	6.833	13.466	2.500	6.567	9.067	34.765	39.901	74.666	516.900
12	Luxembourg	Jos Cillien	5.567	7.200	12.767	4.667	4.400	9.067	5.933	5.900	11.833	6.067	6.200	12.267	7.633	7.067	14.700	2.833	5.000	7.833	32.700	35.767	~~68.467~~	516.900
12	Luxembourg	Mathias Erang	6.167	—	6.167	4.333	4.000	8.333	—	—	—	7.167	—	7.167	—	—	—	5.333	—	5.333	23.000	4.000	~~27.000~~	516.900
12	Luxembourg	Total	50.801	51.734	102.535	53.700	55.166	108.866	47.900	47.899	95.799	57.733	50.167	107.900	51.933	50.001	101.934	41.799	53.534	95.333	303.866	308.501	612.367	516.900
13	Bulgaria	Neno Mirchev	5.800	8.333	14.133	8.233	9.067	17.300	6.000	6.800	12.800	7.800	8.667	16.467	9.033	7.267	16.300	8.800	8.133	16.933	45.666	48.267	93.933	452.333
13	Bulgaria	Georgi Dimitrov	6.433	6.867	13.300	8.300	8.200	16.500	3.667	1.667	5.334	6.400	7.333	13.733	7.400	6.900	14.300	7.267	6.833	14.100	39.467	37.800	77.267	452.333
13	Bulgaria	Yovcho Khristov	6.667	6.433	13.100	7.500	6.300	13.800	4.500	6.200	10.700	5.567	8.367	13.934	7.100	6.200	13.300	5.333	4.267	9.600	36.667	37.767	74.434	452.333
13	Bulgaria	Ivan Chureshki	5.233	5.333	10.566	7.933	6.800	14.733	3.667	3.667	7.334	7.200	7.667	14.867	6.500	6.800	13.300	4.000	6.800	10.800	34.533	37.067	71.600	452.333
13	Bulgaria	Pando Sidov	3.767	5.733	9.500	7.733	4.167	11.900	4.233	5.867	10.100	6.267	7.567	13.834	7.100	6.400	13.500	4.000	6.333	10.333	33.100	36.067	69.167	452.333
13	Bulgaria	Lyuben Obretenov	4.700	6.333	11.033	5.833	7.767	13.600	4.000	5.000	9.000	4.733	6.133	10.866	7.267	6.333	13.600	2.500	5.333	7.833	29.033	36.899	65.932	452.333
13	Bulgaria	Ivan Stoychev	1.667	5.900	7.567	4.733	2.467	7.200	4.167	5.633	9.800	5.833	7.067	12.900	6.533	5.300	11.833	4.000	3.567	7.567	26.933	29.934	~~50.867~~	452.333
13	Bulgaria		—	—	—	—	—	—	—	—	—	—	—	—	—	—	—	—	—	—	—	—		452.333
13	Bulgaria	Total	34.267	44.932	79.199	50.265	44.768	95.033	30.234	34.834	65.068	43.800	52.801	96.001	50.933	45.200	96.133	35.900	41.266	77.166	245.399	263.801	509.200	452.333
14	Romania	Francisc Drăghici	2.667	7.133	9.800	7.233	8.233	15.466	4.033	4.700	8.733	6.500	8.067	14.567	5.667	6.733	12.400	5.000	7.533	12.533	31.100	42.399	73.499	360.765
14	Romania	Iosif Matusec	3.767	6.233	10.000	5.000	4.000	9.000	5.100	4.400	9.500	5.000	6.567	11.567	4.700	5.767	10.467	3.333	5.833	9.166	26.900	32.800	59.700	360.765
14	Romania	Remus Ludu	2.700	5.067	7.767	4.333	4.200	8.533	5.333	6.633	11.966	5.200	6.167	11.367	5.133	5.500	10.633	2.000	6.533	8.533	24.699	34.100	58.799	360.765
14	Romania	Andrei Abraham	4.900	6.767	11.677	1.867	4.533	6.400	4.733	5.300	10.033	4.833	5.867	10.700	5.800	6.700	12.500	2.000	5.400	7.400	24.133	34.567	58.700	360.765
14	Romania	Alexandru Dan	4.533	5.633	10.166	4.833	3.333	8.166	4.167	5.200	9.367	5.267	5.067	10.334	5.233	6.667	11.900	2.000	5.933	7.933	26.033	31.833	57.866	360.765
14	Romania	Iohan Schmidt	2.867	5.333	8.200	1.500	4.133	5.633	4.267	4.233	8.500	2.167	4.567	6.734	5.667	6.967	12.634	3.333	7.167	10.500	19.801	32.400	52.201	360.765
14	Romania	Ion Albert	2.333	6.433	8.766	2.900	5.200	8.100	4.500	5.400	9.900	3.000	5.900	8.900	4.000	5.833	9.833	—	5.567	5.567	16.733	34.333	~~51.066~~	360.765
14	Romania	Vasile Moldovan	4.400	—	4.400	6.500	5.167	11.667	3.567	—	3.567	4.667	—	4.667	4.233	—	4.233	2.500	—	2.500	25.867	5.167	~~31.034~~	360.765
14	Romania	Total	28.167	42.599	70.766	34.166	38.799	72.965	35.700	35.866	71.566	36.634	42.202	78.836	40.433	44.167	84.600	20.166	43.966	64.132	195.266	247.599	442.865	360.765
