= Gymnastics at the 1936 Summer Olympics – Men's horizontal bar =

Olympic gymnastics event

Men's horizontal bar at the Games of the XI Olympiad
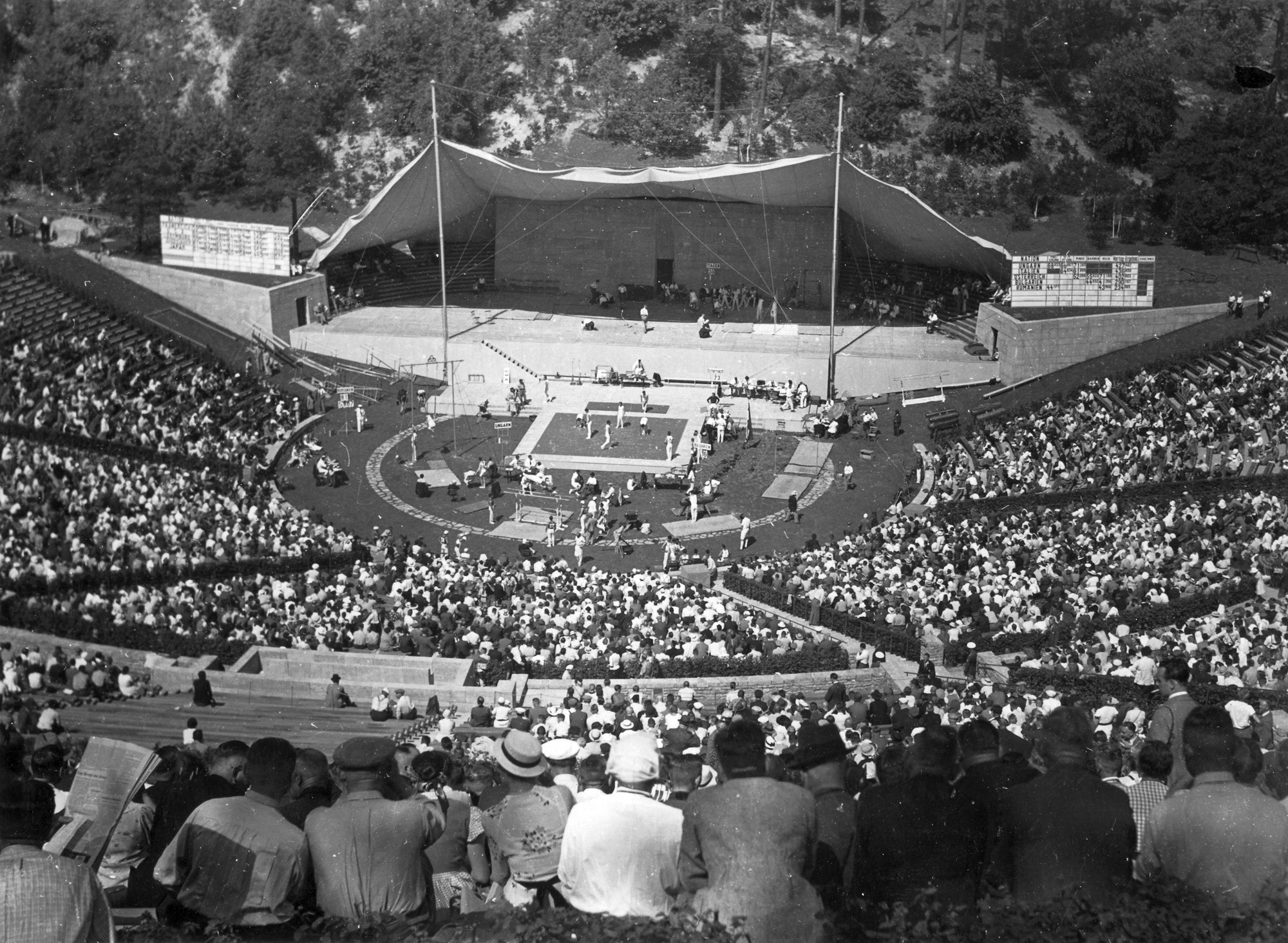
- Gymnastics competitions in 1936
- Venue: Waldbühne
- Dates: 10–11 August 1936
- Competitors: 110 from 14 nations
- Winning score: 19.367

Medalists
1st place, gold medalist(s)		Aleksanteri Saarvala; Finland
2nd place, silver medalist(s)		Konrad Frey; Germany
3rd place, bronze medalist(s)		Alfred Schwarzmann; Germany

The men's horizontal bar competition at the 1936 Summer Olympics was held at the Waldbühne on 10 and 11 August. It was the sixth appearance of the event. There were 110 competitors from 14 nations, with each nation sending a team of up to 8 men. The event was won by Aleksanteri Saarvala of Finland, the nation's first victory in the event. Germany took silver and bronze, as Konrad Frey finished second and Alfred Schwarzmann finished third.

== Background ==
This was the sixth appearance of the event, which is one of the five apparatus events held every time there were apparatus events at the Summer Olympics (no apparatus events were held in 1900, 1908, 1912, or 1920). Seven of the 12 gymnasts from 1932 returned: silver medalist Heikki Savolainen, bronze medalist Einari Teräsvirta, and fourth-place finisher Ilmari Pakarinen of Finland, fourth-place finisher István Pelle and seventh-place finisher Miklós Péter of Hungary, tenth-place finisher Al Jochim of the United States, and eleventh-place finisher Savino Guglielmetti of Italy. Savolainen, Pelle, Péter, and Jochim had competed in 1928 as well. The 1928 gold medalist, Georges Miez of Switzerland, was also back in Berlin. Miez had finished second in the 1934 world championship to Ernst Winter of Germany, also competing in front of his home nation.

Austria, Bulgaria, and Romania each made their debut in the men's horizontal bar. The United States made its fifth appearance, most of any nation, having missed only the inaugural 1896 Games.

== Competition format ==
The gymnastics format returned to the aggregation format used in 1928 but not in 1932. Each nation entered a team of eight gymnasts (Bulgaria had only 7). All entrants in the gymnastics competitions (Neri of Italy did not compete in the horizontal bar) performed both a compulsory exercise and a voluntary exercise, with the scores summed to give a final total. The scores in the horizontal bar were added to the other apparatus scores to give individual all-around scores; the top six individual scores on each team were summed to give a team all-around score. No separate finals were contested.

The compulsory exercise was described in the Official Report:

Sidestand: From a slight preliminary swing with under-grip, high underswing, backward swing, swingstem (rise) with a high frontal turn into a momentary handstand with upper grip (i.e. ½ turn about the stationary hand, either left or right), lower body to a free support, free hip-circle backward with straddling over bar into a balance-support, seat or balance-circle backward, drop backward, return-straddle of legs and at once squat through and hip-swing-up rearways forward with flanking backward into a momentary side-support frontways, underswing with ½ turn left or right, forward swing into giant-circle-swing into a momentary handstand with mixed grip, (change to upper grip) two giant-circles backward, with the second circle ½ turn left or right into a handstand with undergrip, one giant-circle forward, at the next giant-circle forward stoop through arms and over bar, scat-circle forward and jump forward into a sidestand rearways, knees bent half deep and arms raised sideward, straighten knees and lower arms to the fundamental position.

== Schedule ==
Date	Time	Round
Monday, 10 August 1936; Tuesday, 11 August 1936	7:00	Final

== Results ==
Rank	Gymnast	Nation	Compulsory	Voluntary	Total
1st place, gold medalist(s)	Aleksanteri Saarvala	Finland	9.700	9.667	19.367
2nd place, silver medalist(s)	Konrad Frey	Germany	9.700	9.567	19.267
3rd place, bronze medalist(s)	Alfred Schwarzmann	Germany	9.700	9.533	19.233
4	Innozenz Stangl	Germany	9.400	9.767	19.167
5	Heikki Savolainen	Finland	9.400	9.733	19.133
6	Ilmari Pakarinen	Finland	9.567	9.500	19.067
7	Martti Uosikkinen	Finland	9.333	9.667	19.000
8	Walter Steffens	Germany	9.333	9.633	18.966
9	Eugen Mack	Switzerland	9.300	9.600	18.900
10	Alois Hudec	Czechoslovakia	9.367	9.467	18.834
11	Eduard Steinemann	Switzerland	9.333	9.467	18.800
11	Matthias Volz	Germany	9.300	9.500	18.800
13	Einari Teräsvirta	Finland	9.300	9.433	18.733
14	Willi Stadel	Germany	9.400	9.300	18.700
15	Frank Cumiskey	United States	9.200	9.400	18.600
15	Gottfried Hermann	Austria	9.200	9.400	18.600
15	Mauri Nyberg-Noroma	Finland	9.000	9.600	18.600
18	Michael Reusch	Switzerland	9.133	9.433	18.566
19	Esa Seeste	Finland	9.067	9.433	18.500
20	Georges Miez	Switzerland	9.167	9.300	18.467
21	István Pelle	Hungary	9.133	9.333	18.466
22	Konrad Grilc	Yugoslavia	9.367	9.000	18.367
23	Walter Bach	Switzerland	8.833	9.500	18.333
23	Lajos Tóth	Hungary	9.033	9.300	18.333
25	Karl Pannos	Austria	8.967	9.333	18.300
26	Metty Logelin	Luxembourg	9.133	9.067	18.200
26	Eino Tukiainen	Finland	9.033	9.167	18.200
28	Walter Beck	Switzerland	9.167	9.000	18.167
28	August Sturm	Austria	9.200	8.967	18.167
30	Savino Guglielmetti	Italy	8.433	9.500	17.933
31	Dimitrije Merzlikin	Yugoslavia	9.300	8.600	17.900
31	Armand Walter	France	8.533	9.367	17.900
33	Yoshitaka Takeda	Japan	9.000	8.733	17.733
34	Adolf Scheffknecht	Austria	8.467	9.200	'17.667
35	Leon Štukelj	Yugoslavia	8.433	9.200	17.633
36	Yoshio Miyake	Japan	9.267	8.333	17.600
36	Bohumil Povejšil	Czechoslovakia	8.833	8.767	17.600
38	Otello Ternelli	Italy	8.633	8.900	17.533
39	Oreste Capuzzo	Italy	8.567	8.833	17.400
40	Josip Primožič	Yugoslavia	9.034	8.333	17.367
40	Jan Sládek	Czechoslovakia	8.400	8.967	17.367
42	Albert Bachmann	Switzerland	8.167	9.167	17.334
43	Egidio Armelloni	Italy	9.167	7.933	17.100
44	Armand Solbach	France	7.667	9.367	17.034
45	Franz Beckert	Germany	7.700	9.333	17.033
46	Neno Mirchev	Bulgaria	8.800	8.133	16.933
47	Gábor Kecskeméti	Hungary	8.233	9.667	16.900
47	Josef Walter	Switzerland	7.867	9.033	16.900
49	Jaroslav Kollinger	Czechoslovakia	7.867	8.900	16.767
50	Fred Meyer	United States	7.467	9.133	16.600
50	József Sarlós	Hungary	8.000	8.600	16.600
52	Jey Kugeler	Luxembourg	7.267	9.300	16.567
53	Fujio Kakuta	Japan	9.100	7.400	16.500
54	Jindrich Tintěra	Czechoslovakia	8.100	8.300	16.400
55	Robert Herold	France	7.500	8.867	16.367
56	Vratislav Petráček	Czechoslovakia	7.733	8.600	16.333
57	Antoine Schildwein	France	7.333	8.933	16.266
58	István Sárkány	Hungary	8.433	7.800	16.233
59	Jan Gajdoš	Czechoslovakia	8.500	7.700	16.200
59	Artie Pitt	United States	7.000	9.200	16.200
61	Danilo Fioravanti	Italy	7.700	8.467	16.167
62	Paul Masino	France	7.433	8.667	16.100
63	Miklos Péter	Hungary	6.900	9.167	16.067
64	Pius Hollenstein	Austria	7.333	8.733	16.066
65	George Wheeler	United States	7.200	8.767	15.967
66	Nicolo Tronci	Italy	7.500	8.433	15.933
67	Janez Pristov	Yugoslavia	7.800	8.000	15.800
68	Boris Gregorka	Yugoslavia	7.000	8.767	15.767
69	Franz Swoboda	Austria	7.133	8.633	15.766
70	Franco Tognini	Italy	8.267	7.400	15.667
71	Hikoroku Arimoto	Japan	7.533	8.133	15.666
72	Lucien Masset	France	6.633	8.967	15.600
73	Hiroshi Matsunobu	Japan	7.367	8.167	15.534
74	Miroslav Forte	Yugoslavia	6.500	8.933	15.433
75	Gyözö Mogyorossy	Hungary	7.300	8.100	15.400
76	Hiroshi Nosaka	Japan	8.333	6.933	15.266
77	Leopold Redl	Austria	6.600	8.633	15.233
77	Joze Vadnov	Yugoslavia	6.733	8.500	15.233
79	Frank Haubold	United States	7.100	8.033	15.133
79	Al Jochim	United States	6.400	8.733	15.133
81	Emanuel Löffler	Czechoslovakia	6.167	8.800	14.967
81	Jos Romersa	Luxembourg	7.067	7.900	14.967
83	Maurice Rousseau	France	5.833	9.100	14.933
84	Robert Pranz	Austria	6.233	8.300	14.533
85	Kiichiro Toyama	Japan	7.500	7.000	14.500
86	Georgi Dimitrov	Bulgaria	7.267	6.833	14.100
87	Chet Phillips	United States	5.333	8.667	14.000
88	Jean Aubry	France	6.233	7.467	13.700
89	Dokan Sone	Japan	9.300	4.000	13.300
90	József Hegedüs	Hungary	4.333	8.533	12.866
91	Francisc Draghici	Romania	5.000	7.533	12.533
92	Marcel Leineweber	Luxembourg	4.333	7.733	12.066
93	Kenny Griffin	United States	6.333	5.667	12.000
94	Franz Haupert	Luxembourg	3.333	7.967	11.300
95	Ivan Chureshki	Bulgaria	4.000	6.800	10.800
96	Iohan Schmidt	Romania	3.333	7.167	10.500
97	Pando Sidov	Bulgaria	4.000	6.333	10.333
98	Ernst Winter	Germany	9.133	1.000	10.133
99	Yovcho Khristov	Bulgaria	5.333	4.267	9.600
100	Iosif Matusec	Romania	3.333	5.833	9.166
101	Willy Klein	Luxembourg	2.500	6.567	9.067
102	Remus Ludu	Romania	2.000	6.533	8.533
103	Alexandru Dan	Romania	2.000	5.933	7.933
104	Jos Cillien	Luxembourg	2.833	5.000	7.833
104	Lyuben Obretenov	Bulgaria	2.500	5.333	7.833
106	Ivan Stoychev	Bulgaria	4.000	3.567	7.567
107	Andrei Abraham	Romania	2.000	5.400	7.400
—	Ion Albert	Romania	5.567	—	DNF
—	Mathias Erang	Luxembourg	5.333	—	DNF
—	Vasile Moldovan	Romania	2.500	—	DNF
