= Gottfried Hermann (gymnast) =

Austrian gymnast

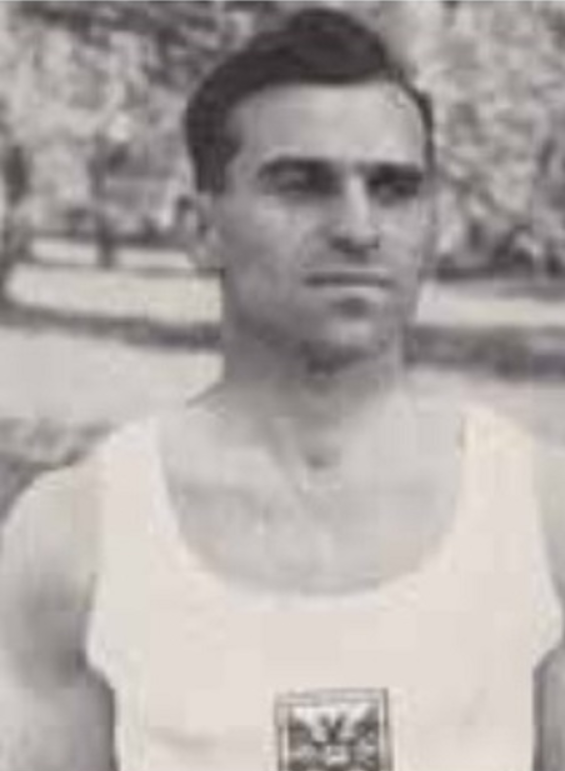
- Hermann in 1936

Personal information
- Born: 22 June 1910 Linz, Austria
- Died: 26 December 1976 (aged 66)

Gymnastics career
- Discipline: Men's artistic gymnastics
- Country represented: Austria
- Club: Union Linz

Gottfried Hermann (22 June 1910 – 26 December 1976) was an Austrian artistic gymnast. Born in Linz, he had domestically represented the gymnastics club Union Linz and qualified for the 1935 Linz Austrian Gymnastics Association Games. He was selected to be part of the Austrian team at the 1936 Summer Olympics and placed 50th in the individual all-around and placed as high as fifteenth in an individual apparatus.

Hermann was also selected to be part of the Austrian team at the 1948 Summer Olympics and placed 111th in the individual all-around and placed as high as 51st in an individual apparatus.

== Biography ==
Gottfried Hermann was born on 22 June 1910 in Linz, Austria. Domestically, he represented the gymnastics club Union Linz. Representing the club, he had qualified for the 1935 Linz Austrian Gymnastics Association Games.

His first Olympic Games were the 1936 Summer Olympics in Berlin, Germany. The artistic gymnastic events were held from 10 to 11 February. As part of the Austrian all-around team, he was the highest ranked Austrian with a total of 97.933 points from a compulsory point score of 48.900 and optional point score of 49.033; the team was ranked 11th out of the 14 teams that competed. With this score, he individually placed 50th out of the 111 competitors in the event. In the other apparatuses, he placed 97th in the rings, equal 72nd in the horse vault, 33rd in the parallel bars, 30th in the pommel horse, equal 23rd in the floor exercise, and equal 15th in the horizontal bar.

His next Olympic Games were the 1948 Summer Olympics in London, England. As part of the Austrian all-around team, he was the second-to-last ranked Austrian gymnast with a score of 132.30; the team had ranked ninth out of the sixteen teams. Individually, he had ranked 111th. In the other apparatuses, he had placed 118th in the floor exercise, 117th in the rings, 115th in the vault, 108th in the pommel horse, 76th in the parallel bars, and 51st in the horizontal bar.

He died on 26 December 1976 at the age of 66.
