= Jaakko Rintanen =

Finnish sports shooter

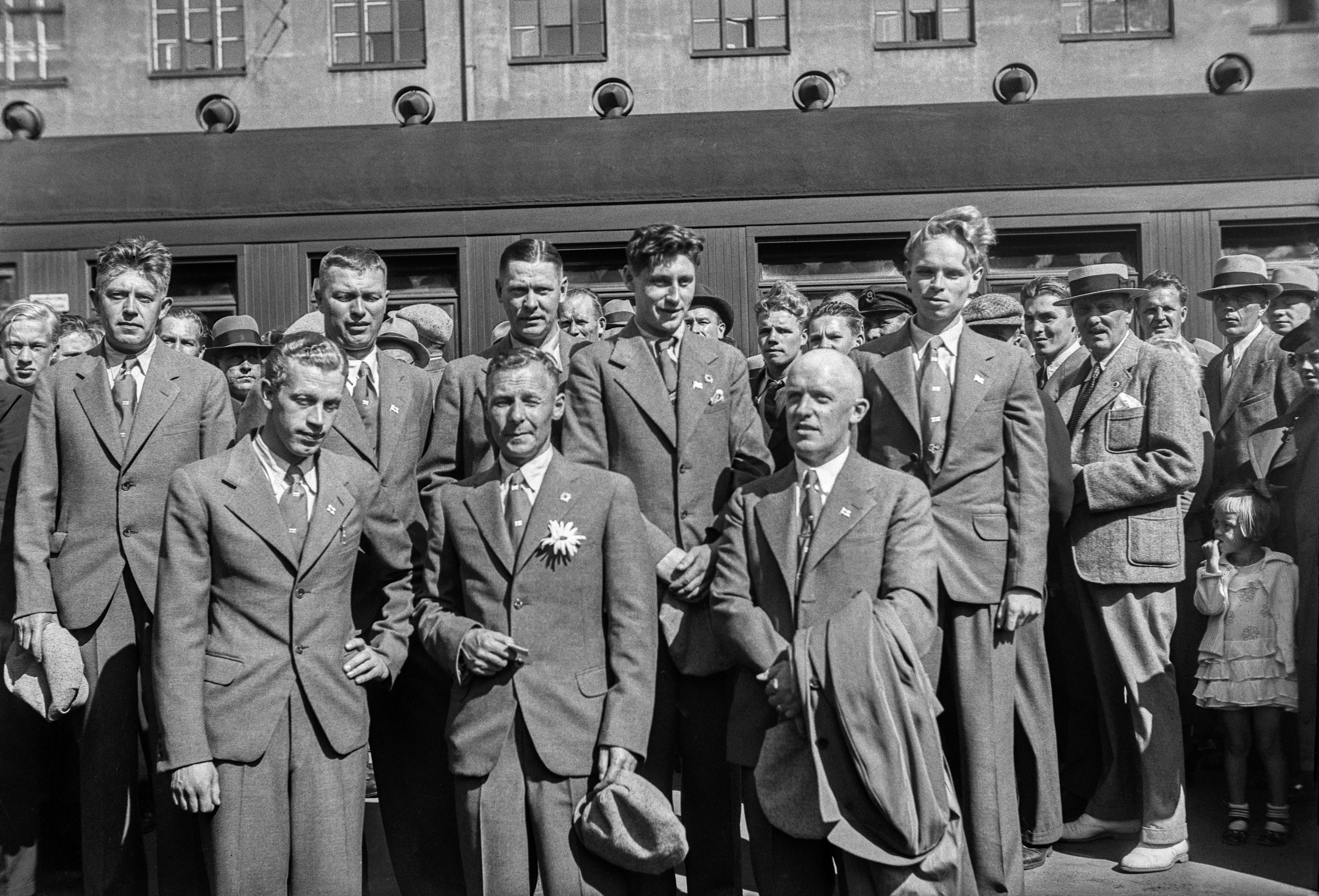
- Jaakko Rintanen among Finnish athletes leaving for the 1936 Olympics

Personal information
- Born: 18 October 1900 Ylistaro, Finland
- Died: 14 July 1971 (aged 70) Vaasa, Finland

Sport
- Sport: Sports shooting

Jaakko Rintanen (18 October 1900 – 14 July 1971) was a Finnish sports shooter. He competed at the 1936 Summer Olympics and 1948 Summer Olympics.
