= Finland at the 1936 Summer Olympics =

- IOC code: FIN
- NOC: Finnish Olympic Committee

in Berlin
- Competitors: 108 (103 men, 5 women) in 14 sports
- Flag bearer: Akilles Järvinen
- Medals Ranked 5th: Gold 7 Silver 6 Bronze 6 Total 19

Summer Olympics appearances (overview)
- 1908; 1912; 1920; 1924; 1928; 1932; 1936; 1948; 1952; 1956; 1960; 1964; 1968; 1972; 1976; 1980; 1984; 1988; 1992; 1996; 2000; 2004; 2008; 2012; 2016; 2020; 2024

Other related appearances
- 1906 Intercalated Games

Finland competed at the 1936 Summer Olympics in Berlin, Germany. 108 competitors, 103 men and 5 women, took part in 70 events in 14 sports.

== Medalists ==
=== Gold ===
- Gunnar Höckert (5 000 m)
- Ilmari Salminen (10 000 m)
- Volmari Iso-Hollo (3 000 m steeplechase)
- Kustaa Pihlajamäki (freestyle wrestling 61 kg)
- Lauri Koskela (Greco-Roman wrestling 66 kg)
- Sten Suvio (boxing welterweight 66,6 kg)
- Ale Saarvala (gymnastics – men's horizontal bar)

=== Silver ===
- Lauri Lehtinen (5 000 m)
- Arvo Askola (10 000 m)
- Kaarlo Tuominen (3 000 m steeplechase)
- Sulo Bärlund (shot put)
- Yrjö Nikkanen (javelin throw)
- Aarne Reini (Greco-Roman wrestling 61 kg)

=== Bronze ===
- Volmari Iso-Hollo (10 000 m)
- Kalervo Toivonen (javelin throw)
- Hermanni Pihlajamäki (freestyle wrestling 66 kg)
- Hjalmar Nyström (freestyle wrestling over 87 kg)
- Eino Virtanen (Greco-Roman wrestling 72 kg)
- Martti Uosikkinen, Heikki Savolainen, Mauri Noroma, Ale Saarvala, Esa Seeste, Ilmari Pakarinen, Einari Teräsvirta, Eino Tukiainen (gymnastics – men's team competition)

== Cycling ==
Two cyclists, both male, represented Finland in 1936.

Individual road race

- Thor Porko
- Tauno Lindgren

Time trial

- Thor Porko

== Diving ==
Men

Athlete	Event	Final	
Athlete	Event	Points	Rank
Ilmari Niemeläinen	3 m springboard	116.80	13
Ilmari Niemeläinen	10 m platform	87.60	14

== Modern pentathlon ==
Three male pentathletes represented Finland in 1936.

- Lauri Kettunen
- Aaro Kiviperä
- Ukko Hietala

== Shooting ==
Eight shooters represented Finland in 1936.

25 m rapid fire pistol

- Jaakko Rintanen
- Ville Elo
- Sulo Cederström

50 m pistol

- Tapio Wartiovaara
- Aatto Nuora
- Jaakko Rintanen

50 m rifle, prone

- Bruno Frietsch
- Olavi Elo
- Viljo Leskinen

== Swimming ==
Men

Ranks given are within the heat.

Athlete	Event	Heat		Semifinal		Final	
Athlete	Event	Time	Rank	Time	Rank	Time	Rank
Heikki Hietanen	100 m freestyle	1:01.0	3 q	1:00.5	=5	Did not advance	
Heikki Hietanen	400 m freestyle	5:08.9	3	Did not advance			

Women

Ranks given are within the heat.

Athlete	Event	Heat		Semifinal		Final	
Athlete	Event	Time	Rank	Time	Rank	Time	Rank
Anja Lappalainen	200 m breaststroke	3:19.1	4	Did not advance			
