= Iohan Schmidt =

Romanian gymnast

- Born: 17 January 1910

Gymnastics career
- Discipline: Men's artistic gymnastics
- Country represented: Romania

Iohan Schmidt (born 17 January 1910, date of death unknown) was a Romanian gymnast. He competed in eight events at the 1936 Summer Olympics.
