= Leopold Redl =

Austrian gymnast (1906–1986)

- Born: 1 August 1906 Vienna, Austria
- Died: 5 December 1986 (aged 80) Vienna, Austria

Gymnastics career
- Discipline: Men's artistic gymnastics
- Country represented: Austria

Leopold Redl (1 August 1906 – 5 December 1986) was an Austrian gymnast. He competed in eight events at the 1936 Summer Olympics.
