= Jos Cillien =

Luxembourgish gymnast (1911–1984)

- Full name: Joseph Cillien
- Born: 19 July 1911 Esch-sur-Alzette, Luxembourg
- Died: 26 April 1984 (aged 72) Luxembourg City, Luxembourg

Gymnastics career
- Discipline: Men's artistic gymnastics
- Country represented: Luxembourg

Joseph Cillien (19 July 1911 – 26 April 1984) was a Luxembourgish gymnast. He competed in eight events at the 1936 Summer Olympics.
