= Marcel Leineweber =

Luxembourgish gymnast (1912–1969)

- Born: 7 December 1912 Pétange, Luxembourg
- Died: 5 November 1969 (aged 56) Niederkorn, Luxembourg

Gymnastics career
- Discipline: Men's artistic gymnastics
- Country represented: Luxembourg

Marcel Leineweber (7 December 1912 – 5 November 1969) was a Luxembourgish gymnast. He competed in eight events at the 1936 Summer Olympics.
