= Yovcho Khristov =

Bulgarian gymnast

- Йовчо Христов
- Born: 25 February 1913

Gymnastics career
- Discipline: Men's artistic gymnastics
- Country represented: Bulgaria

Yovcho Khristov (Bulgarian: Йовчо Христов) (born 25 February 1913, date of death unknown) was a Bulgarian gymnast. He competed in eight events at the 1936 Summer Olympics.
