= Adolf Scheffknecht =

Austrian gymnast (1914–1941)

- Born: 4 October 1914 Bregenz, Austria-Hungary
- Died: 11 September 1941 (aged 26) Zapadnaya Litsa, Russia

Gymnastics career
- Discipline: Men's artistic gymnastics
- Country represented: Austria

Adolf Scheffknecht (4 October 1914 – 11 September 1941) was an Austrian gymnast. He competed in eight events at the 1936 Summer Olympics. He was killed in action during World War II.
