= Dimitrije Merzlikin =

Slovenian gymnast

- Димитрије Мерзликин
- Born: 6 November 1914
- Height: 1.64 m (5 ft 5 in)

Gymnastics career
- Discipline: Men's artistic gymnastics
- Country represented: Yugoslavia
- Club: Sokolskog društva Beograd V. Vežbati

Dimitrije Merzlikin (born 6 November 1914, date of death unknown) was a Slovenian gymnast. He competed in eight events at the 1936 Summer Olympics.
