= Pius Hollenstein =

Austrian gymnast (1907–1974)

- Full name: Johann Hollenstein
- Born: 3 November 1907 Lustenau, Austria-Hungary
- Died: 2 March 1974 (aged 66) Hohenems, Austria

Gymnastics career
- Discipline: Men's artistic gymnastics
- Country represented: Austria

Johann "Pius" Hollenstein (3 November 1907 – 2 March 1974) was an Austrian gymnast. He competed in eight events at the 1936 Summer Olympics.
