= Ion Albert =

Romanian gymnast

- Alternative name: János Albert
- Born: 2 June 1910 Kolozsvár, Austria-Hungary
- Died: 1990 (aged 79–80) Cluj-Napoca, Romania

Gymnastics career
- Discipline: Men's artistic gymnastics
- Country represented: Romania

Ion Albert (2 June 1910 – 1990) was a Romanian gymnast. He competed in eight events at the 1936 Summer Olympics.
