= Francisc Drăghici =

Romanian gymnast

- Alternative name: Frederic Drăghici
- Born: 1 June 1913 Arad, Austria-Hungary
- Died: 1973 (aged 59–60)

Gymnastics career
- Discipline: Men's artistic gymnastics
- Country represented: Romania

Francisc Drăghici (1 June 1913 – 1973) was a Romanian gymnast. He competed in eight events at the 1936 Summer Olympics.
