= Pando Sidov =

Bulgarian gymnast

- Пандо Сидов
- Born: 15 May 1910

Gymnastics career
- Discipline: Men's artistic gymnastics
- Country represented: Bulgaria

Pando Sidov (born 15 May 1910, date of death unknown) was a Bulgarian gymnast. He competed in eight events at the 1936 Summer Olympics.
