= Waldbühne =

Theatre at Olympiapark Berlin in Berlin, Germany

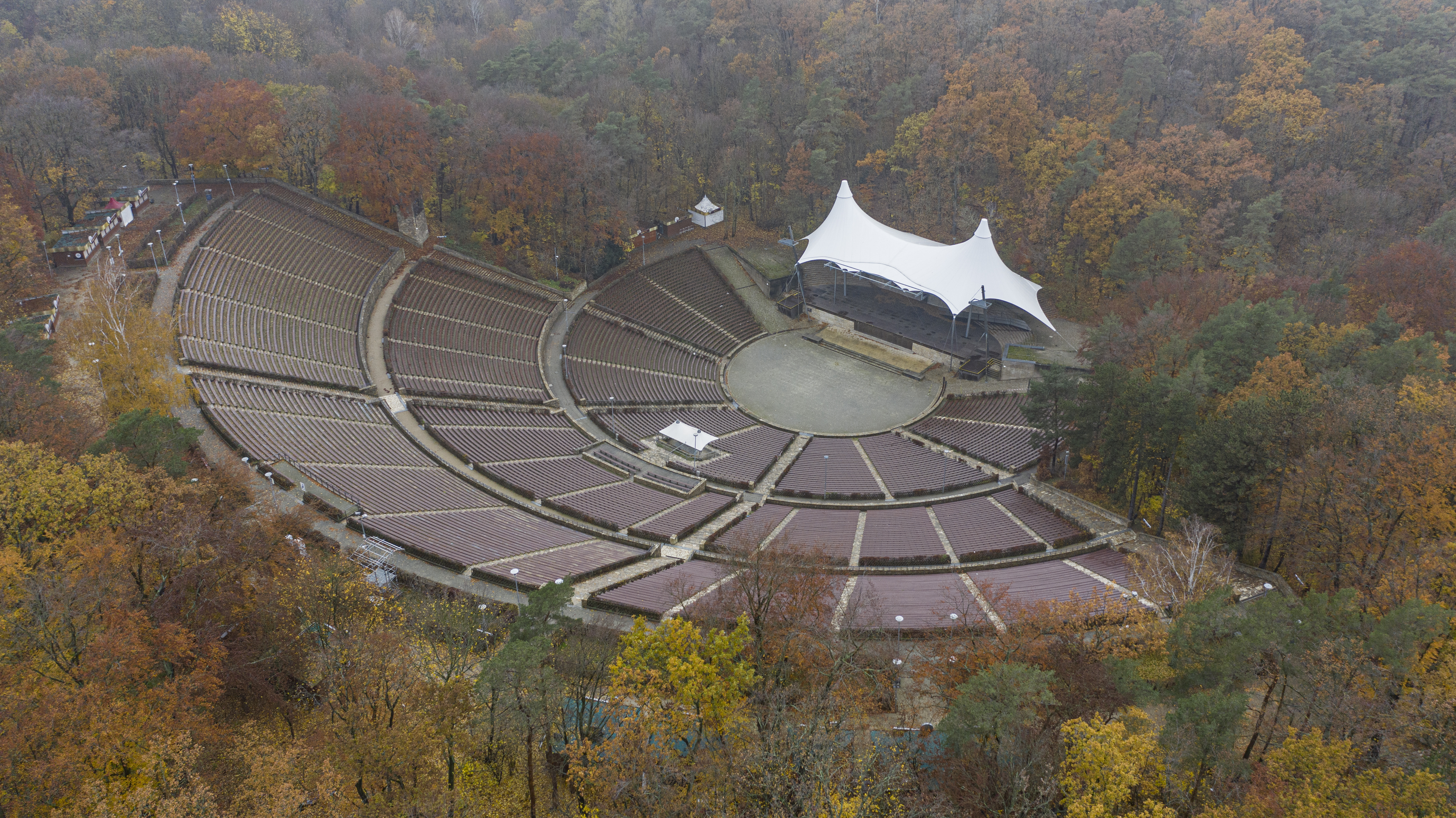
- Aerial view (2019)
- Interactive map of Waldbühne
- Former names: Dietrich-Eckart-Freilichtbühne (1936–48)
- Address: Glockenturmstraße 1; 14053 Berlin; Germany
- Location: Olympiapark Berlin
- Coordinates: 52°30′57″N 13°13′44″E
- Owner: Senate of Berlin
- Operator: CTS Eventim
- Capacity: 22,290
- Type: Amphitheatre

Construction
- Built: 1934–36
- Opened: 2 August 1936; 90 years ago
- Renovated: 1969, 1982

Website
- Venue website (in German)

The Waldbühne (Woodland Stage or Forest Stage) is an amphitheatre at Olympiapark Berlin in Berlin, Germany. The venue is located off Friedrich-Friesen-Allee just northeast of Glockenturmstraße, and seats more than 22,000 people.

The amphiteatre was designed by German architect Werner March in emulation of a Greek theatre. It built between 1934 and 1936 as the Dietrich-Eckart-Freilichtbühne (Dietrich Eckart Open Air Theater), a Nazi Thingplatz, and opened in association with the 1936 Summer Olympics. Since World War II it has been used for a variety of events, including boxing matches, film showings and classical and rock concerts.

== Nazi era ==
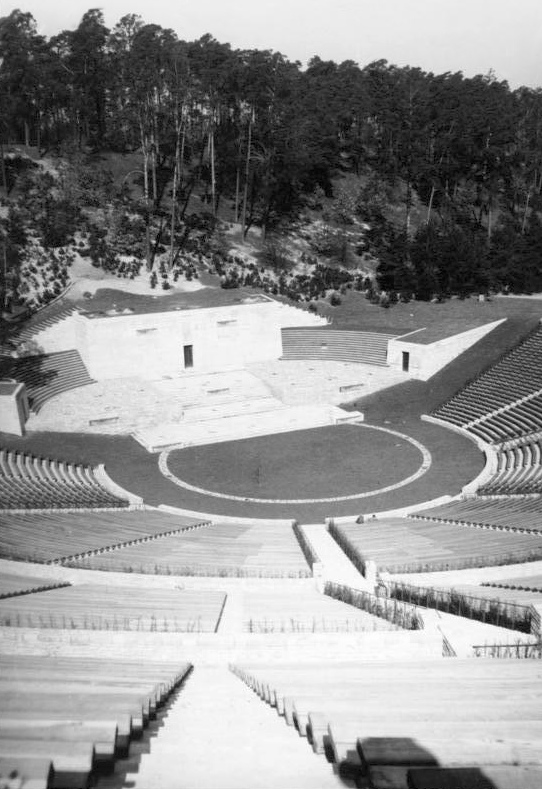
Dietrich-Eckart-Bühne, 1939

The theatre was built as part of the Olympic complex on the request of Propaganda Minister Joseph Goebbels. March made use of a natural ravine and modelled the theatre on ancient Greek amphitheatres. With the intent of showing the kinship between ancient Greek and Germanic culture, the entrance is flanked by two pairs of reliefs by Adolf Wamper: on the left, representing the "Fatherland", two male nudes, one with a sword, the other with a spear, a pairing that was to be used more famously by Arno Breker; and on the right, representing artistic celebration, two female nudes, one with a laurel wreath, the other with a lyre. The arena, the Maifeld field, and the Olympic stadium itself were designed to be used together for large events, and March also provided an indoor arena in the nearby Haus des deutschen Sports (House of German Sports) that has been regarded as a smaller equivalent of the Dietrich Eckart theatre.

The theatre opened on 2 August 1936, the day after the opening of the games, with the première of Eberhard Wolfgang Möller's Frankenburger Würfelspiel. 20,000 people were in attendance, and the Reich Labour Service supplied 1,200 extras. It was also used for some events of the games, in particular boxing matches. During the Olympics and later, dance and choral movement productions took place there, in addition to operas: during the Olympics and again in 1937 for the celebration of the 700th anniversary of the founding of Berlin, Handel's Hercules; also in 1937, Gluck's Orfeo; and in 1939, a production of Wagner's Rienzi paid for and co-designed by Hitler in association with Benno von Arent.

== Post-war ==
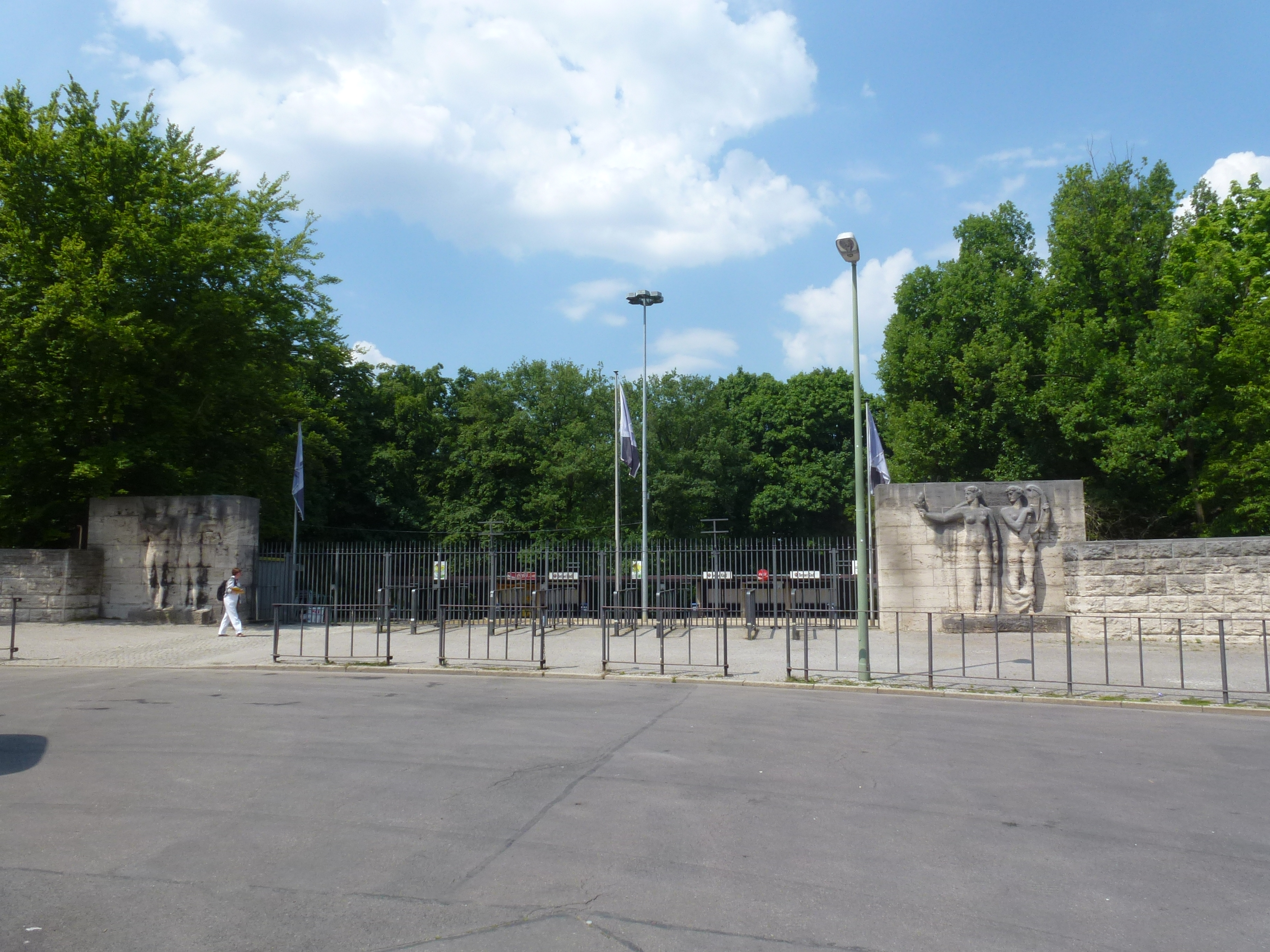
Entrance to the Waldbühne, with reliefs by Adolf Wamper

After World War II, the Olympic grounds were within the British occupation sector of Berlin. They were released for public use beginning in 1948, and the amphitheatre was used for film showings, including for the Berlinale, and, beginning in 1960, for boxing matches. Use for concerts began in the 1960s, but when The Rolling Stones performed there on 15 September 1965, the theatre was severely damaged. Fans stormed the stage, and after the band left after a set of only 20 to 25 minutes, fought police, who attempted to control them with rubber truncheons and fire hoses, and destroyed the seating, fire hydrants and other furnishings. 270,000 DM in damage was done, in a riot that fulfilled the dire prophecies of some Berlin newspapers about rock concerts and was the first inter-generational battle of the 1960s in West Germany. A reporter from Bild wrote of the concert, "I know Hell." The arena had to be completely renovated and was then little used until 1978.

Jimi Hendrix second-to-last appearance in "Berlin Super Concert70" was planned at the Waldbühne on 4 September 1970. Due to bad weather conditions, it was relocated to the Deutschlandhalle. Alongside were also Ten Years After and Procol Harum. In the reality series Pawn Stars, Rick Harrison bought a rare poster for this concert for $4,000 (episode #20 of season 5, aired 30 January 2012).

Following a concert by Bob Marley in 1980, it became well known as a rock venue, and has been regularly used for that purpose since. Some other artists who have appeared there include Bruce Springsteen, who 23 000 people came to see, Queen, U2, David Bowie, Elton John, Rod Stewart, The Rolling Stones, Iron Maiden, AC/DC, Berlin's Rammstein in 2016, Germany's Alphaville in 1986, Bon Jovi, Metallica, Van Halen, Black Sabbath, Pearl Jam, Kings of Leon, Radiohead, Robbie Williams, Nick Cave & The Bad Seeds, Prince, Depeche Mode, Whitney Houston and Barbra Streisand.

Phil Collins performed at the Waldbühne on 14–15 July 1990 during his Seriously, Live! World Tour. While a concert in East Berlin would have been symbolically possible following the fall of the Berlin Wall, the economic situation in East Germany was still uncertain. Holding the concerts at the Waldbühne ensured financial viability while allowing audiences from both East and West Berlin to attend.

The Berlin Philharmonic holds its outdoor concert there every summer, featuring noted guest artists. This concert has been broadcast on live TV since 1992.

The facility seats more than 22,000, in three ranks that rise 30 metres (98 ft); the last row of seats, the 88th, is also 93.5 metres (307 ft) from the centre of the orchestra pit, so originally 40 microphones were installed on-stage, feeding 10 coordinated groups of loudspeakers. In 1982, a canopy costing 200,000 € was erected over the stage, providing both a visual and an acoustic barrier. Concert promoter Peter Schwenkow leased it from 1981 until the end of 2008, when the lease was transferred to CTS Eventim.

Before COVID-19, American-Armenian rock and roll band System of a Down was set to perform at the arena on 8 June 2020, American singer-songwriter Taylor Swift was set to perform on 24 June 2020 as part of Lover Fest and Canadian singer Celine Dion was due to return to the arena after 11 years with the Courage World Tour on 22 July 2020. However, Dion's concert was rescheduled and relocated to Mercedes-Benz Arena.

== See also ==
- List of contemporary amphitheaters
