= Gábor Kecskeméti =

Hungarian gymnast

- Born: 30 January 1912 Békés, Austria-Hungary
- Died: 23 September 1981 (aged 69) Békés, Hungarian People's Republic

Gymnastics career
- Discipline: Men's artistic gymnastics
- Country represented: Hungary
- Club: Testnevelési Főiskola Sport Egylet

Gábor Kecskeméti (30 January 1912 – 23 September 1981) was a Hungarian gymnast. He competed in eight events at the 1936 Summer Olympics.
