= Franz Swoboda (gymnast) =

Austrian gymnast

- Born: 28 January 1909

Gymnastics career
- Discipline: Men's artistic gymnastics
- Country represented: Austria

Franz Swoboda (born 28 January 1909, date of death unknown) was an Austrian gymnast. He competed in eight events at the 1936 Summer Olympics.
