= Robert Herold =

French gymnast

- Born: 13 November 1910 Strasbourg, France
- Died: 19 October 1969 (aged 58) Dombasle-sur-Meurthe, France

Gymnastics career
- Discipline: Men's artistic gymnastics
- Country represented: France
- Gym: Sports et Loisirs Constantia Strasbourg-Neudorf

Robert Herold (13 November 1910 – 19 October 1969) was a French gymnast. He competed in eight events at the 1936 Summer Olympics.
