= Neno Mirchev =

Bulgarian gymnast

- Нено Мирчев
- Born: 9 September 1909 Ruse, Bulgaria

Gymnastics career
- Discipline: Men's artistic gymnastics
- Country represented: Bulgaria

Neno Mirchev (Bulgarian: Нено Мирчев) (born 9 September 1909, date of death unknown) was a Bulgarian gymnast. He competed in eight events at the 1936 Summer Olympics.
