= Karl Pannos =

Austrian gymnast (1908–1944)

- Born: 16 September 1908 Vienna, Austria-Hungary
- Died: 17 September 1944 (aged 36) Soviet Union

Gymnastics career
- Discipline: Men's artistic gymnastics
- Country represented: Austria

Karl Pannos (16 September 1908 – 17 September 1944) was an Austrian gymnast. He competed in eight events at the 1936 Summer Olympics. He was killed during World War II.
