= Gymnastics at the 1932 Summer Olympics – Men's artistic individual all-around =

Olympic gymnastics event

Men's artistic individual all-around at the Games of the X Olympiad
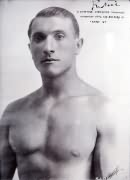
- Gold medalist Romeo Neri
- Venue: Los Angeles Memorial Coliseum
- Dates: 8–10 August 1932
- Competitors: 24 from 5 nations
- Winning score: 140.625

Medalists
1st place, gold medalist(s)		Romeo Neri; Italy
2nd place, silver medalist(s)		István Pelle; Hungary
3rd place, bronze medalist(s)		Heikki Savolainen; Finland

The men's artistic individual all-around event was part of the gymnastics programme at the 1932 Summer Olympics. It was the eighth appearance of the event, which was established in 1900. The competition was held from Monday, August 8, 1932, to Wednesday, August 10, 1932. Twenty-four gymnasts from five nations competed. Each nation could enter a team of 5 gymnasts; Hungary sent only 4. The event was won by Romeo Neri of Italy, the nation's first victory in the event since 1920 and fourth overall (most among nations at the time). István Pelle of Hungary took silver and Heikki Savolainen of Finland earned bronze; it was the first medal in the event for each nation.

The scores of the top 4 individuals for each nation were summed to give a score for the team event. The individual apparatus events were separate from the all-around, with scores not being carried over between the individual events.

== Background ==
This was the eighth appearance of the men's individual all-around. The first individual all-around competition had been held in 1900, after the 1896 competitions featured only individual apparatus events. A men's individual all-around has been held every Games since 1900.

Three of the top 10 gymnasts from the 1928 Games returned: fourth-place finisher Romeo Neri of Italy and sixth-place finishers Mauri Nyberg-Noroma and Heikki Savolainen, both of Finland. Savolainen had the highest total score at the 1931 World Artistic Gymnastics Championships but was not recognized as World Champion because he had not scored 60% or better in all of the exercises. Neither 1930 World Champion Josip Primozic of Yugoslavia or 1931 World Champion Alois Hudec of Czechoslovakia (who had scored below Savolainen in total but had reached 60% in each exercise) competed in Los Angeles.

Japan made its debut in the event. Italy made its seventh appearance, most among nations, having missed only the 1904 Games in St. Louis.

== Competition format ==
The 1932 competition did not follow the aggregation method introduced in 1924 (roughly following the 1904 format) and used again in 1928. Instead, the apparatus events were completely separate from the individual all-around. In the all-around, each competitor performed a compulsory and an optional exercise on each of 4 apparati: parallel bars, horizontal bar, rings, and pommel horse; the vault featured 2 compulsory and 2 optional exercises for each gymnast. Each exercise received a score from 0 to 30. The score for each apparatus was determined by averaging the scores for the 2 or 4 exercises in that apparatus, so the apparatus score was also from 0 to 30. The individual total was the sum of the 5 apparatus scores, 0 to 150.

== Schedule ==
Date	Time	Round
Monday, 8 August 1932		Final
Tuesday, 9 August 1932		Final, continued
Wednesday, 10 August 1932		Final, continued

== Results ==
An obligatory and a voluntary exercise was performed on each of the five different apparatuses: horizontal bar, parallel bars, pommel horse, flying rings (rings), and long horse vaulting (vault) (except that 2 obligatory and 2 voluntary exercises were performed on the vault). The results from the first four were divided by two and the score of the vault competition was added. The results based on total points.

Rank	Gymnast	Nation	Total
1st place, gold medalist(s)	Romeo Neri	Italy	140.625
2nd place, silver medalist(s)	István Pelle	Hungary	134.925
3rd place, bronze medalist(s)	Heikki Savolainen	Finland	134.575
4	Mario Lertora	Italy	134.400
5	Savino Guglielmetti	Italy	134.375
6	Frank Haubold	United States	132.525
7	Oreste Capuzzo	Italy	132.450
8	Fred Meyer	United States	131.650
9	Mauri Nyberg-Noroma	Finland	129.800
10	Al Jochim	United States	129.075
11	Frank Cumiskey	United States	129.025
12	Franco Tognini	Italy	127.275
13	Einari Teräsvirta	Finland	122.700
13	Ilmari Pakarinen	Finland	122.700
15	Martti Uosikkinen	Finland	121.075
16	Miklós Péter	Hungary	119.200
17	Michael Schuler	United States	114.925
18	Toshihiko Sasano	Japan	108.475
19	Péter Boros	Hungary	105.775
20	József Hegedűs	Hungary	105.750
21	Shigeo Homma	Japan	103.100
22	Takashi Kondo	Japan	101.925
23	Yoshitaka Takeda	Japan	88.500
24	Fujio Kakuta	Japan	85.300
