= Gymnastics at the 1932 Summer Olympics – Men's floor =

The men's floor or free-handed exercise event was part of the gymnastics programme at the 1932 Summer Olympics. It was contested for the first time at the Olympics. The competition was held on Monday, August 8, 1932. Twenty-five gymnasts from six nations competed.

== Medalists ==
Gold	Silver	Bronze
István Pelle; Hungary	Georges Miez; Switzerland	Mario Lertora; Italy

== Results ==
A separate competition was held, unrelated to the all-around event but only participants from the all-around contest were allowed to compete. Georges Miez was allowed to compete by special permission.

Place	Gymnast	Total
1	István Pelle (HUN)	28.8
2	Georges Miez (SUI)	28.3
3	Mario Lertora (ITA)	27.7
4	Frank Haubold (USA)	27.0
4	Romeo Neri (ITA)	27.0
6	Heikki Savolainen (FIN)	26.9
7	Martti Uosikkinen (FIN)	26.4
7	Al Jochim (USA)	26.4
9	Einari Teräsvirta (FIN)	26.1
10	Miklós Péter (HUN)	25.7
11	Franco Tognini (ITA)	25.5
12	Fred Meyer (USA)	25.3
12	Oreste Capuzzo (ITA)	25.3
14	Frank Cumiskey (USA)	24.8
15	Toshihiko Sasano (JPN)	24.7
16	Michael Schuler (USA)	24.3
17	Mauri Nyberg-Noroma (FIN)	24.1
18	József Hegedűs (HUN)	23.5
19	Péter Boros (HUN)	23.0
20	Ilmari Pakarinen (FIN)	22.6
21	Takashi Kondo (JPN)	22.2
22	Savino Guglielmetti (ITA)	21.6
23	Fujio Kakuta (JPN)	20.6
24	Shigeo Homma (JPN)	20.5
25	Yoshitaka Takeda (JPN)	18.8
