= Gymnastics at the 1932 Summer Olympics – Men's artistic team all-around =

The men's team all-around event was part of the gymnastics programme at the 1932 Summer Olympics. It was the seventh Olympic appearance of the event, which was established in 1904. The competition was held from Monday, August 8, 1932, to Wednesday, August 10, 1932. Twenty-four gymnasts from five nations competed.

== Medalists ==
Gold	Silver	Bronze
Italy; Oreste Capuzzo; Savino Guglielmetti; Mario Lertora; Romeo Neri; Franco Tognini	United States; Frank Haubold; Frank Cumiskey; Al Jochim; Fred Meyer; Michael Schuler	Finland; Mauri Nyberg-Noroma; Ilmari Pakarinen; Heikki Savolainen; Einari Teräsvirta; Martti Uosikkinen

== Results ==
An obligatory and a voluntary exercise was performed on each of the five different apparatuses: horizontal bar, parallel bars, pommel horse, flying rings (rings), and long horse vaulting (vault). The results were based on points from the individual all-around. The best four individual total scores counted towards team score.

Place	Gymnast	Total	Rank
1
1	Italy	541.850	
1	Romeo Neri	140.625	1
1	Mario Lertora	134.400	4
1	Savino Guglielmetti	134.375	5
1	Oreste Capuzzo	132.450	7
1	Franco Tognini	127.275	12
2
2	United States	522.275	
2	Frank Haubold	132.525	6
2	Fred Meyer	131.650	8
2	Al Jochim	129.075	10
2	Frank Cumiskey	129.025	11
2	Michael Schuler	114.925	17
3
3	Finland	509.995	
3	Heikki Savolainen	134.575	3
3	Mauri Nyberg-Noroma	129.800	9
3	Ilmari Pakarinen	122.700	13
3	Einari Teräsvirta	122.700	13
3	Martti Uosikkinen	121.075	15
4
4	Hungary	465.650	
4	István Pelle	134.925	2
4	Miklós Péter	119.200	16
4	Péter Boros	105.775	19
4	József Hegedűs	105.750	20
5
5	Japan	402.000	
5	Toshihiko Sasano	108.475	18
5	Shigeo Homma	103.100	21
5	Takashi Kondo	101.925	22
5	Yoshitaka Takeda	88.500	23
5	Fujio Kakuta	85.300	24
