= Gymnastics at the 1932 Summer Olympics – Men's pommel horse =

Olympic gymnastics event

Men's pommel horse at the Games of the X Olympiad
- Artistic gymnastics pictogram
- Venue: Los Angeles Memorial Coliseum
- Date: August 11, 1932
- Competitors: 10 from 5 nations
- Winning score: 57.2

Medalists
1st place, gold medalist(s)		István Pelle; Hungary
2nd place, silver medalist(s)		Omero Bonoli; Italy
3rd place, bronze medalist(s)		Frank Haubold; United States

The men's pommel horse event was part of the gymnastics programme at the 1932 Summer Olympics. It was contested for the fifth time after 1896, 1904, 1924, and 1928. The competition was held on Thursday, August 11, 1932. Ten gymnasts from five nations competed. Each nation was limited to three gymnasts. The event was won by István Pelle of Hungary, the nation's first medal in the pommel horse. Italy also earned its first medal in the event, with Omero Bonoli's silver. Frank Haubold took bronze, the United States' first medal in the event since 1904.

== Background ==
This was the fifth appearance of the event, which is one of the five apparatus events held every time there were apparatus events at the Summer Olympics (no apparatus events were held in 1900, 1908, 1912, or 1920). Five of the gymnasts from 1928 returned: bronze medalist Heikki Savolainen and seventh-place finisher Mauri Nyberg-Noroma of Finland, along with István Pelle of Hungary and Al Jochim and Frank Haubold of the United States. The reigning (1930) world champion was Josip Primozic of Yugoslavia, but Yugoslavia did not have any gymnasts travel to Los Angeles.

Mexico made its debut in the men's pommel horse. The United States made its fourth appearance, most of any nation, having missed only the inaugural 1896 Games.

== Competition format ==
For the second (after 1896) and last time, the pommel horse competition was entirely separate from the individual all-around rather than being entirely aggregated into the all-around or sharing qualification results. Each gymnast performed one compulsory exercise and one voluntary exercise. The score for each exercise was up to 30 points, with a combined score of 60 points maximum.

== Schedule ==
Date	Time	Round
Thursday, 11 August 1932	8:00	Final

== Results ==
A separate competition was held, unrelated to the all-around event. Two exercises were contested with the results based on total points.

Rank	Gymnast	Nation	Compulsory	Voluntary	Total
1st place, gold medalist(s)	István Pelle	Hungary	28.9	28.3	57.2
2nd place, silver medalist(s)	Omero Bonoli	Italy	27.9	28.7	56.6
3rd place, bronze medalist(s)	Frank Haubold	United States	27.8	27.9	55.7
4	Frank Cumiskey	United States	26.3	28.4	54.7
5	Péter Boros	Hungary	27.2	25.5	52.7
6	Al Jochim	United States	25.6	25.6	51.2
7	Heikki Savolainen	Finland	23.4	27.6	51.0
8	Ilmari Pakarinen	Finland	24.7	25.2	49.9
9	Mauri Nyberg-Noroma	Finland	23.8	25.9	49.7
10	Ismael Mosqueira	Mexico	20.4	21.4	41.8
