= Gymnastics at the 1932 Summer Olympics – Men's horizontal bar =

Olympic gymnastics event

Men's horizontal bar at the Games of the X Olympiad
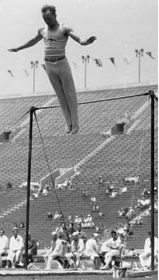
- Heikki Savolainen competing on the horizontal bar
- Venue: Los Angeles Memorial Coliseum
- Date: 11 August 1932
- Competitors: 12 from 6 nations
- Winning score: 55.0

Medalists
| 1st place, gold medalist(s) | | Dallas Bixler; United States |
| 2nd place, silver medalist(s) | | Heikki Savolainen; Finland |
| 3rd place, bronze medalist(s) | | Einari Teräsvirta; Finland |

The men's horizontal bar event was part of the gymnastics programme at the 1932 Summer Olympics. It was contested for the fifth time after 1896, 1904, 1924, and 1928. The competition was held on Thursday, August 11, 1932. Twelve gymnasts from six nations competed. Each nation was limited to three gymnasts. The event was won by Dallas Bixler of the United States, the nation's first victory in the men's horizontal bar since 1904 and second overall (most of any nation). Heikki Savolainen and Einari Teräsvirta of Finland tied for second; the two agreed that Savolainen would take silver and Teräsvirta bronze. They were the first medals for Finland in the horizontal bar.

== Background ==
This was the fifth appearance of the event, which is one of the five apparatus events held every time there were apparatus events at the Summer Olympics (no apparatus events were held in 1900, 1908, 1912, or 1920). Four of the 12 gymnast had competed in the 1928 event: Heikki Savolainen of Finland, István Pelle and Miklós Péter of Hungary, and Al Jochim of the United States. Savolainen had been the top placed of them at 13th. Pelle had won the 1930 world championship, with Péter the runner-up; Savolainen had been victorious at the off-cycle 1931 world championship.

Japan and Mexico each made their debut in the men's horizontal bar. The United States made its fourth appearance, most of any nation, having missed only the inaugural 1896 Games.

== Competition format ==
For the second (after 1896) and last time, the horizontal bar competition was entirely separate from the individual all-around rather than being entirely aggregated into the all-around or sharing qualification results. Each gymnast performed one compulsory exercise and one voluntary exercise. The score for each exercise was up to 30 points, with a combined score of 60 points maximum.

== Schedule ==
| Date | Time | Round |
|---|---|---|
| Thursday, 11 August 1932 | 8:00 | Final |

== Results ==
A separate competition was held, unrelated to the all-around event. Two exercises were contested with the results based on total points. Heikki Savolainen and Einari Teräsvirta finished level on points and tied for second place. The silver and bronze medal was awarded after a mutual agreement between the two competitors.

| Rank | Gymnast | Nation | Compulsory | Voluntary | Total |
|---|---|---|---|---|---|
| 1st place, gold medalist(s) | Dallas Bixler | United States | 26.6 | 28.4 | 55.0 |
| 2nd place, silver medalist(s) | Heikki Savolainen | Finland | 27.5 | 26.7 | 54.2 |
| 3rd place, bronze medalist(s) | Einari Teräsvirta | Finland | 27.6 | 26.6 | 54.2 |
| 4 | Ilmari Pakarinen | Finland | 26.2 | 25.6 | 51.8 |
| 4 | István Pelle | Hungary | 25.7 | 26.1 | 51.8 |
| 6 | Michael Schuler | United States | 24.4 | 22.3 | 46.7 |
| 7 | Miklós Péter | Hungary | 24.6 | 20.8 | 45.4 |
| 8 | Mahito Haga | Japan | 19.0 | 18.4 | 37.4 |
| 9 | Ismael Mosqueira | Mexico | 20.8 | 12.0 | 32.8 |
| 10 | Al Jochim | United States | 24.1 | — | 24.1 |
| 11 | Savino Guglielmetti | Italy | 23.9 | — | 23.9 |
| 12 | Giovanni Lattuada | Italy | 22.7 | — | 22.7 |
