= Gymnastics at the 1932 Summer Olympics – Men's vault =

Gymnastics at the Olympics

Men's vault at the Games of the X Olympiad
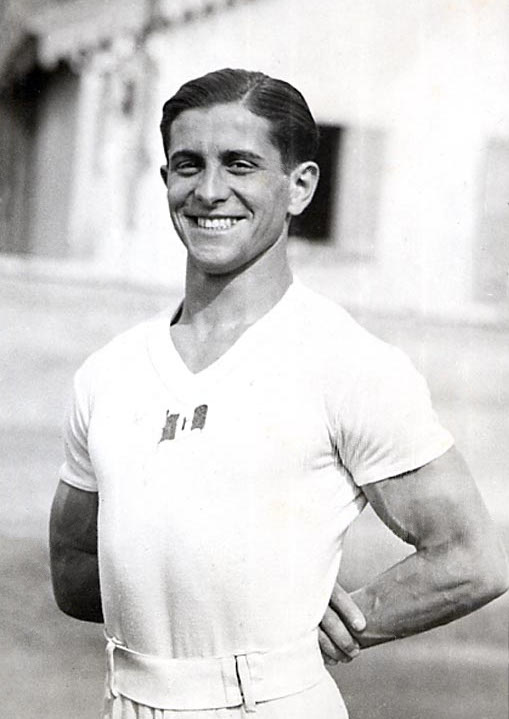
- Savino Guglielmetti
- Venue: Los Angeles Memorial Coliseum
- Date: 10 August 1932
- Competitors: 10 from 4 nations
- Winning score: 54.1

Medalists
1st place, gold medalist(s)		Savino Guglielmetti; Italy
2nd place, silver medalist(s)		Al Jochim; United States
3rd place, bronze medalist(s)		Ed Carmichael; United States

The men's vault or "long horse vaulting" event was part of the gymnastics programme at the 1932 Summer Olympics. It was contested for the fifth time after 1896, 1904, 1924, and 1928. The competition was held on Wednesday, August 10, 1932. Ten gymnasts from four nations competed. Each nation was limited to three gymnasts. The event was won by Savino Guglielmetti of Italy, the nation's first medal in the event. Americans Al Jochim and Ed Carmichael took silver and bronze, respectively.

== Background ==
This was the fifth appearance of the event, which is one of the five apparatus events held every time there were apparatus events at the Summer Olympics (no apparatus events were held in 1900, 1908, 1912, or 1920). Four of the gymnasts from 1928 returned: István Pelle and Miklós Péter of Hungary, Mario Lertora of Italy, and Al Jochim of the United States; none had finished better than 21st among the 85-man field that year. The vault was still not an event at the gymnastics world championships, and there was no clear favorite (especially without reigning Olympic champion Eugen Mack not present).

No nation made its debut in the men's vault. The United States made its fourth appearance, most of any nation, having missed only the inaugural 1896 Games.

== Competition format ==
In the early Olympics, the vault format changed considerably. The 1932 competition bore little resemblance to the 1924 or 1928 events. The 1932 event used a "vaulting horse" aligned parallel to the gymnast's run (rather than the modern "vaulting table" in use since 2004). Each gymnast made two compulsory vaults and two voluntary vaults, with the better of the two counting in each category. The score for each vault was up to 30 points, with a combined score of 60 points maximum. A jump-off, with each gymnast making another compulsory and another voluntary vault, was held to break a tie for third place.

For the second (after 1896) and last time, the vault competition was entirely separate from the individual all-around rather than being entirely aggregated into the all-around or sharing qualification results.

== Schedule ==
Date	Time	Round
Wednesday, 10 August 1932	8:00	Final

== Results ==
Rank	Gymnast	Nation	C	V	Total	C	V	Jump-off
1st place, gold medalist(s)	Savino Guglielmetti	Italy	26.4	27.7	54.1			
2nd place, silver medalist(s)	Al Jochim	United States	26.6	26.7	53.3			
3rd place, bronze medalist(s)	Ed Carmichael	United States	26.2	26.4	52.6	26.3	28.2	54.5
4	Einari Teräsvirta	Finland	26.0	26.6	52.6	26.1	26.6	52.7
5	Marcel Gleyre	United States	25.8	26.6	52.4			
6	István Pelle	Hungary	26.7	24.7	51.4			
7	Miklós Péter	Hungary	24.2	26.7	50.9			
8	Mario Lertora	Italy	25.2	24.0	49.2			
9	Péter Boros	Hungary	24.2	24.6	48.8			
10	Heikki Savolainen	Finland	20.0	26.6	46.6			
