= Italy men's national artistic gymnastics team =

Italy
- Continental union: European Union of Gymnastics
- National federation: Italian Gymnastics Federation

Olympic Games
- Medals: Gold: 1912, 1920, 1924, 1932; Bronze: 1960

World Championships
- Medals: Bronze: 1909, 1911, 1913

Junior World Championships
- Medals: Bronze: 2019, 2023

European Championships
- Medals: Gold: 2023; Silver: 2022; Bronze: 2024, 2025

The Italy men's national artistic gymnastics team represents Italy in FIG international competitions.

== History ==
The Italian men's national artistic gymnastics team first participated in the Olympic Games in 1908. They won their first team medal, a gold, in 1912.

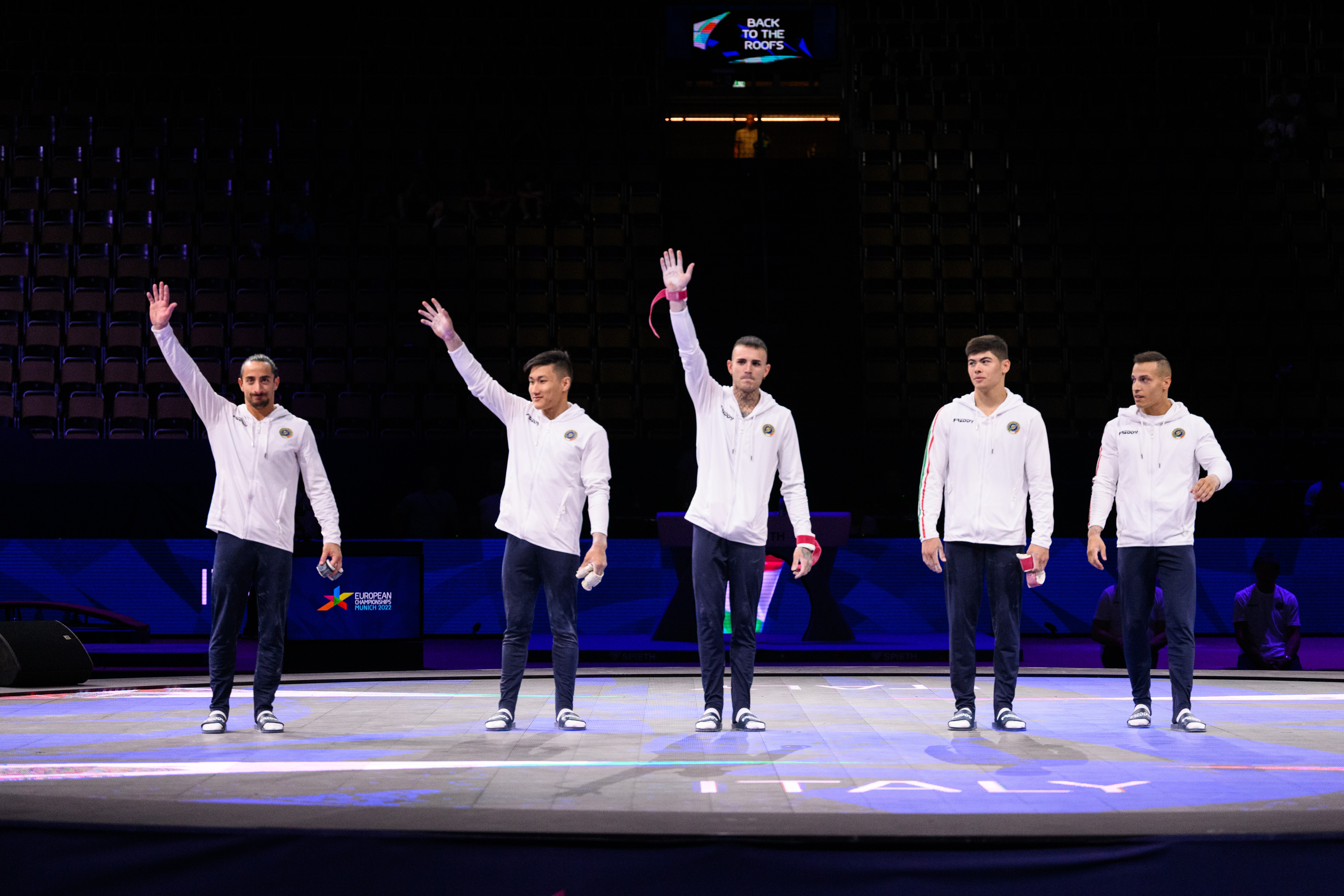
Italian team at the 2022 European Championships

== Team competition results ==
=== Olympic Games ===
Year	Position	Squad
1908	6th place	See team members
1912	Gold medal	Pietro Bianchi, Guido Boni, Alberto Braglia, Giuseppe Domenichelli, Carlo Fregosi, Alfredo Gollini, Francesco Loi, Luigi Maiocco, Giovanni Mangiante, Lorenzo Mangiante, Serafino Mazzarochi, Guido Romano, Paolo Salvi, Luciano Savorini, Adolfo Tunesi, Giorgio Zampori, Umberto Zanolini, Angelo Zorzi
1920	Gold medal	See team members
1924	Gold medal	Luigi Cambiaso, Mario Lertora, Vittorio Lucchetti, Luigi Maiocco, Ferdinando Mandrini, Francesco Martino, Giuseppe Paris, Giorgio Zampori
1928	6th place	Romeo Neri, Mario Lertora, Vittorio Lucchetti, Ferdinando Mandrini, Giuseppe Lupi, Mario Tambini, Giuseppe Paris, Ezio Roselli
1932	Gold medal	Oreste Capuzzo, Savino Guglielmetti, Mario Lertora, Romeo Neri, Franco Tognini
1936	5th place	Savino Guglielmetti, Oreste Capuzzo, Egidio Armelloni, Danilo Fioravanti, Franco Tognini, Nicolò Tronci, Otello Ternelli, Romeo Neri
1948	5th place	Guido Figone, Luigi Zanetti, Savino Guglielmetti, Domenico Grosso, Quinto Vadi, Danilo Fioravanti, Ettore Perego, Egidio Armelloni
1952	10th place	Fabio Bonacina, Silvio Brivio, Arrigo Carnoli, Guido Figone, Orlando Polmonari, Littorio Sampieri, Quinto Vadi, Luigi Zanetti
1960	Bronze medal	Giovanni Carminucci, Pasquale Carminucci, Gianfranco Marzolla, Franco Menichelli, Orlando Polmonari, Angelo Vicardi
1964	4th place	Giovanni Carminucci, Pasquale Carminucci, Luigi Cimnaghi, Bruno Franceschetti, Franco Menichelli, Angelo Vicardi
1968	12th place	Giovanni Carminucci, Pasquale Carminucci, Luigi Cimnaghi, Bruno Franceschetti, Franco Menichelli, Vincenzo Mori
1972	16th place	Luigi Coppa, Franco Donegà, Adolfo Lampronti, Carmine Luppino, Maurizio Milanetto, Fedele Spatazza
1988	8th place	Vittorio Allievi, Paolo Bucci, Jury Chechi, Boris Preti, Gabriele Sala, Riccardo Trapella
1996	12th place	Boris Preti, Roberto Galli, Jury Chechi, Paolo Bucci, Sergio Luini, Marcello Barbieri, Francesco Colombo
2004	12th place	Igor Cassina, Matteo Morandi, Enrico Pozzo, Alberto Busnari, Matteo Angioletti, Jury Chechi
2008	12th place	Enrico Pozzo, Matteo Morandi, Andrea Coppolino, Matteo Angioletti, Alberto Busnari, Igor Cassina
2012	11th place	Matteo Angioletti, Alberto Busnari, Matteo Morandi, Paolo Ottavi, Enrico Pozzo
2024	6th place	Yumin Abbadini, Nicola Bartolini, Lorenzo Minh Casali, Mario Macchiati, Carlo Macchini

=== World Championships ===
Year	Position	Squad
1909	Bronze medal	Pietro Borghi, Alberto Braglia, Otello Capitani, Angelo Mazzoncini, Guido Romano, Giorgio Zampori
1911	Bronze medal	Osvaldo Palazzi, Giorgio Zampori, Paolo Salvi, Pietro Bianchi, Guido Romano
1913	Bronze medal	Pietro Bianchi, Guido Boni, Osvaldo Palazzi, Guido Romano, Paolo Salvi, Giorgio Zampori
1931	5th place	
1934	4th place	
1950	4th place	
1954	8th place	
1962	5th place	
1966	9th place	
2018	14th place	Ludovico Edalli, Marco Lodadio, Carlo Macchini, Andrea Russo, Marco Sarrugerio
2019	13th place	Nicola Bartolini, Ludovico Edalli, Marco Lodadio, Carlo Macchini, Niccolo Mozzato
2022	4th place	Yumin Abbadini, Nicola Bartolini, Lorenzo Minh Casali, Carlo Macchini, Matteo Levantesi
2023	8th place	Yumin Abbadini, Nicola Bartolini, Lorenzo Minh Casali, Matteo Levantesi, Mario Macchiati
2026	9th place	Yumin Abbadini, Mario Macchiati, Simone Speranza, Gabriele Targhetta, Niccolò Vannucchi

=== Junior World Championships ===
Year	Position	Squad
2019	Bronze medal	Lorenzo Bonicelli, Ivan Brunello, Lorenzo Minh Casali, Mirko Galimberti
2023	Bronze medal	Manuel Berettera, Tommaso Brugnami, Riccardo Villa, Lorenzo Tomei
2025	6th place	Pietro Mazzola, Riccardo Ruggeri, Simone Speranza, Ivan Rigon

== Most decorated gymnasts ==
This list includes all Italian male artistic gymnasts who have won multiple medals at the Olympic Games or the World Artistic Gymnastics Championships, with at least one being an individual medal.

Rank	Gymnast	Team	AA	FX	PH	SR	VT	PB	HB	Olympic Total	World Total	Total
1	Giorgio Zampori	1912; 1920; 1924; 1909; 1911; 1913	1920		1913; 1911	1913; 1909		1924; 1911; 1913		5	9	14
2	Jury Chechi					1996; 2004; 1993; 1994; 1995; 1996; 1997; 1989; 1991				2	7	9
3	Franco Menichelli	1960		1964; 1960; 1962; 1966		1964; 1966		1964		5	3	8
4	Romeo Neri	1932	1932; 1934				1934	1932	1928	4	2	6
5	Paolo Salvi	1912; 1920; 1911; 1913			1911			1911		2	4	6
6	Guido Romano	1912; 1909; 1911; 1913				1909			1911	1	5	6
7	Pietro Bianchi	1912; 1920; 1911; 1913				1911				2	3	5
8	Matteo Morandi					2012; 2002; 2003; 2005; 2010				1	4	5
9	Alberto Braglia	1912; 1909	1908; 1912							3	1	4
9	Guido Boni	1912; 1913				1913		1913		1	3	4
11	Osvaldo Palazzi	1911; 1913			1913				1913	0	4	4
12	Mario Lertora	1924; 1932		1932						3	0	3
13	Igor Cassina								2004; 2003; 2009	1	2	3
14	Marco Lodadio					2019; 2021; 2018				0	3	3
15	Francesco Martino	1924				1924				2	0	2
15	Savino Guglielmetti	1932					1932			2	0	2
17	Adolfo Tunesi	1912	1912							2	0	2
18	Andrea Coppolino					2001; 2003				0	2	2
18	Angelo Mazzoncini	1909				1909				0	2	2

== See also ==
- Italy women's national artistic gymnastics team
