= Floor at the Olympics =

Floor at the Olympic Games
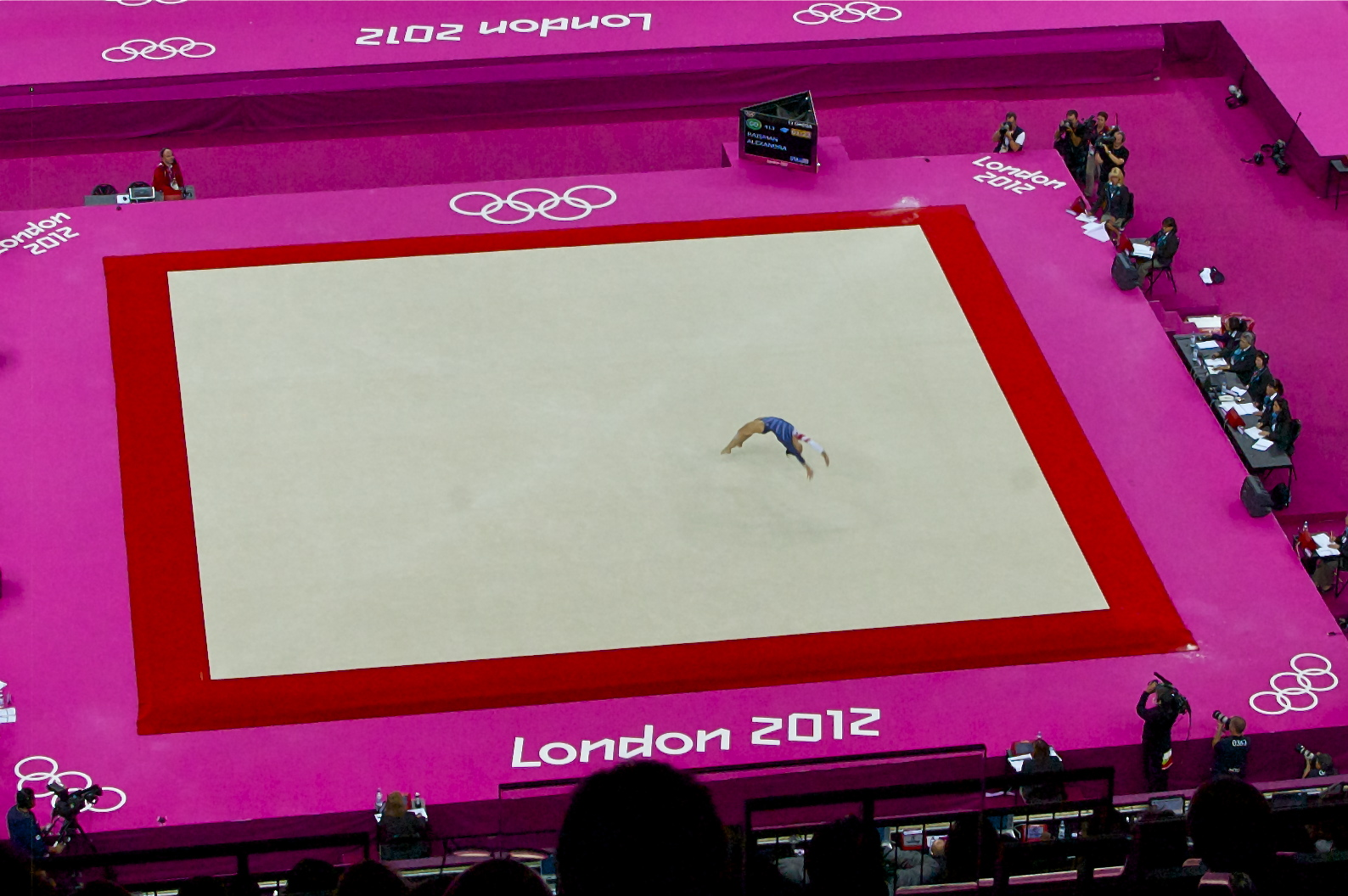
- Floor at the 2012 Olympic Games

Overview
- Sport: Artistic gymnastics
- Gender: Men and women
- Years held: Men: 1932–2024; Women: 1952–2024

Reigning champion
- Men: Carlos Yulo (PHI)
- Women: Rebeca Andrade (BRA)

The floor (or floor exercise) is an artistic gymnastics event held at the Summer Olympics. The event was first held for men at the 1932 Olympic Games. For women it was first held in 1952.

== Medalists ==
=== Men ===
Games	Gold	Silver	Bronze
1932 Los Angeles	István Pelle; Hungary	Georges Miez; Switzerland	Mario Lertora; Italy
1936 Berlin	Georges Miez; Switzerland	Josef Walter; Switzerland	Konrad Frey; Germany Eugen Mack; Switzerland
1948 London	Ferenc Pataki; Hungary	János Mogyorósi-Klencs; Hungary	Zdenek Ruzicka; Czechoslovakia
1952 Helsinki	William Thoresson; Sweden	Jerzy Jokiel; Poland Tadao Uesako; Japan	none awarded
1956 Melbourne	Valentin Muratov; Soviet Union	Nobuyuki Aihara; Japan Viktor Chukarin; Soviet Union William Thoresson; Sweden	none awarded
1960 Rome	Nobuyuki Aihara; Japan	Yuri Titov; Soviet Union	Franco Menichelli; Italy
1964 Tokyo	Franco Menichelli; Italy	Yukio Endo; Japan Viktor Lisitsky; Soviet Union	none awarded
1968 Mexico City	Sawao Kato; Japan	Akinori Nakayama; Japan	Takeshi Katō; Japan
1972 Munich	Nikolai Andrianov; Soviet Union	Akinori Nakayama; Japan	Shigeru Kasamatsu; Japan
1976 Montreal	Nikolai Andrianov; Soviet Union	Vladimir Marchenko; Soviet Union	Peter Kormann; United States
1980 Moscow	Roland Brückner; East Germany	Nikolai Andrianov; Soviet Union	Alexander Dityatin; Soviet Union
1984 Los Angeles	Li Ning; China	Lou Yun; China	Koji Sotomura; Japan
1984 Los Angeles	Li Ning; China	Lou Yun; China	Philippe Vatuone; France
1988 Seoul	Sergei Kharkov; Soviet Union	Vladimir Artemov; Soviet Union	Yukio Iketani; Japan
1988 Seoul	Sergei Kharkov; Soviet Union	Vladimir Artemov; Soviet Union	Lou Yun; China
1992 Barcelona	Li Xiaoshuang; China	Yukio Iketani; Japan Hrihoriy Misyutin; Unified Team	none awarded
1996 Atlanta	Ioannis Melissanidis; Greece	Li Xiaoshuang; China	Alexei Nemov; Russia
2000 Sydney	Igors Vihrovs; Latvia	Alexei Nemov; Russia	Yordan Yovchev; Bulgaria
2004 Athens	Kyle Shewfelt; Canada	Marian Drăgulescu; Romania	Yordan Yovchev; Bulgaria
2008 Beijing	Zou Kai; China	Gervasio Deferr; Spain	Anton Golotsutskov; Russia
2012 London	Zou Kai; China	Kōhei Uchimura; Japan	Denis Ablyazin; Russia
2016 Rio de Janeiro	Max Whitlock; Great Britain	Diego Hypólito; Brazil	Arthur Mariano; Brazil
2020 Tokyo	Artem Dolgopyat; Israel	Rayderley Zapata; Spain	Xiao Ruoteng; China
2024 Paris	Carlos Yulo; Philippines	Artem Dolgopyat; Israel	Jake Jarman; Great Britain

==== Multiple medalists ====
Rank	Gymnast	Nation	Olympics	Gold	Silver	Bronze	Total
1	Nikolai Andrianov	Soviet Union	1972–1980	2	1	0	3
2	Zou Kai	China	2008–2012	2	0	0	2
3	Artem Dolgopyat	Israel	2020–2024	1	1	0	2
3	Georges Miez	Switzerland	1932–1936	1	1	0	2
3	William Thoresson	Sweden	1952–1956	1	1	0	2
3	Li Xiaoshuang	China	1992–1996	1	1	0	2
7	Franco Menichelli	Italy	1960–1964	1	0	1	2
8	Akinori Nakayama	Japan	1968–1972	0	2	0	2
9	Yukio Iketani	Japan	1988–1992	0	1	1	2
9	Lou Yun	China	1984–1988	0	1	1	2
9	Alexei Nemov	Russia	1996–2000	0	1	1	2
12	Yordan Yovchev	Bulgaria	2000–2004	0	0	2	2

==== Medalists by country ====
Rank	Nation	Gold	Silver	Bronze	Total
1	Soviet Union	4	6	1	11
2	China	4	2	2	8
3	Japan	2	7	4	13
4	Hungary	2	1	0	3
5	Switzerland	1	2	1	4
6	Israel	1	1	0	2
6	Sweden	1	1	0	2
8	Italy	1	0	2	3
9	Great Britain	1	0	1	2
10	Canada	1	0	0	1
10	East Germany	1	0	0	1
10	Greece	1	0	0	1
10	Latvia	1	0	0	1
10	Philippines	1	0	0	1
15	Spain	0	2	0	2
16	Russia	0	1	3	4
17	Brazil	0	1	1	2
18	Poland	0	1	0	1
18	Romania	0	1	0	1
18	Unified Team	0	1	0	1
21	Bulgaria	0	0	2	2
22	Czechoslovakia	0	0	1	1
22	France	0	0	1	1
22	Germany	0	0	1	1
22	United States	0	0	1	1

=== Women ===
Games	Gold	Silver	Bronze
1952 Helsinki	Ágnes Keleti; Hungary	Maria Gorokhovskaya; Soviet Union	Margit Korondi; Hungary
1956 Melbourne	Ágnes Keleti; Hungary Larisa Latynina; Soviet Union	none awarded	Elena Leuşteanu; Romania
1960 Rome	Larisa Latynina; Soviet Union	Polina Astakhova; Soviet Union	Tamara Lyukhina; Soviet Union
1964 Tokyo	Larisa Latynina; Soviet Union	Polina Astakhova; Soviet Union	Anikó Ducza; Hungary
1968 Mexico City	Věra Čáslavská; Czechoslovakia Larisa Petrik; Soviet Union	none awarded	Natalia Kuchinskaya; Soviet Union
1972 Munich	Olga Korbut; Soviet Union	Ludmilla Tourischeva; Soviet Union	Tamara Lazakovich; Soviet Union
1976 Montreal	Nellie Kim; Soviet Union	Ludmilla Tourischeva; Soviet Union	Nadia Comăneci; Romania
1980 Moscow	Nadia Comăneci; Romania	none awarded	Maxi Gnauck; East Germany
1980 Moscow	Nellie Kim; Soviet Union	none awarded	Natalia Shaposhnikova; Soviet Union
1984 Los Angeles	Ecaterina Szabo; Romania	Julianne McNamara; United States	Mary Lou Retton; United States
1988 Seoul	Daniela Silivaș; Romania	Svetlana Boginskaya; Soviet Union	Diana Dudeva; Bulgaria
1992 Barcelona	Lavinia Miloșovici; Romania	Henrietta Ónodi; Hungary	Cristina Bontaș; Romania Tatiana Gutsu; Unified Team Shannon Miller; United States
1996 Atlanta	Lilia Podkopayeva; Ukraine	Simona Amânar; Romania	Dominique Dawes; United States
2000 Sydney	Elena Zamolodchikova; Russia	Svetlana Khorkina; Russia	Simona Amânar; Romania
2004 Athens	Cătălina Ponor; Romania	Nicoleta Daniela Șofronie; Romania	Patricia Moreno; Spain
2008 Beijing	Sandra Izbașa; Romania	Shawn Johnson; United States	Nastia Liukin; United States
2012 London	Aly Raisman; United States	Cătălina Ponor; Romania	Aliya Mustafina; Russia
2016 Rio de Janeiro	Simone Biles; United States	Aly Raisman; United States	Amy Tinkler; Great Britain
2020 Tokyo	Jade Carey; United States	Vanessa Ferrari; Italy	Angelina Melnikova; ROC Mai Murakami; Japan
2024 Paris	Rebeca Andrade; Brazil	Simone Biles; United States	Ana Bărbosu; Romania

==== Multiple medalists ====
Rank	Gymnast	Nation	Olympics	Gold	Silver	Bronze	Total
1	Larisa Latynina	Soviet Union	1956–1964	3	0	0	3
2	Ágnes Keleti	Hungary	1952–1956	2	0	0	2
2	Nellie Kim	Soviet Union	1976–1980	2	0	0	2
4	Simone Biles	United States	2016, 2024	1	1	0	2
4	Cătălina Ponor	Romania	2004, 2012	1	1	0	2
4	Aly Raisman	United States	2012–2016	1	1	0	2
7	Nadia Comăneci	Romania	1976–1980	1	0	1	2
8	Polina Astakhova	Soviet Union	1960–1964	0	2	0	2
8	Ludmilla Tourischeva	Soviet Union	1972–1976	0	2	0	2
10	Simona Amânar	Romania	1996–2000	0	1	1	2

==== Medalists by country ====
Rank	Nation	Gold	Silver	Bronze	Total
1	Soviet Union	7	6	4	17
2	Romania	6	3	5	14
3	United States	3	4	4	11
4	Hungary	2	1	2	5
5	Russia	1	1	1	3
6	Brazil	1	0	0	1
6	Czechoslovakia	1	0	0	1
6	Ukraine	1	0	0	1
9	Italy	0	1	0	1
10	Bulgaria	0	0	1	1
10	East Germany	0	0	1	1
10	Great Britain	0	0	1	1
10	Japan	0	0	1	1
10	ROC	0	0	1	1
10	Spain	0	0	1	1
10	Unified Team	0	0	1	1

== Gallery ==
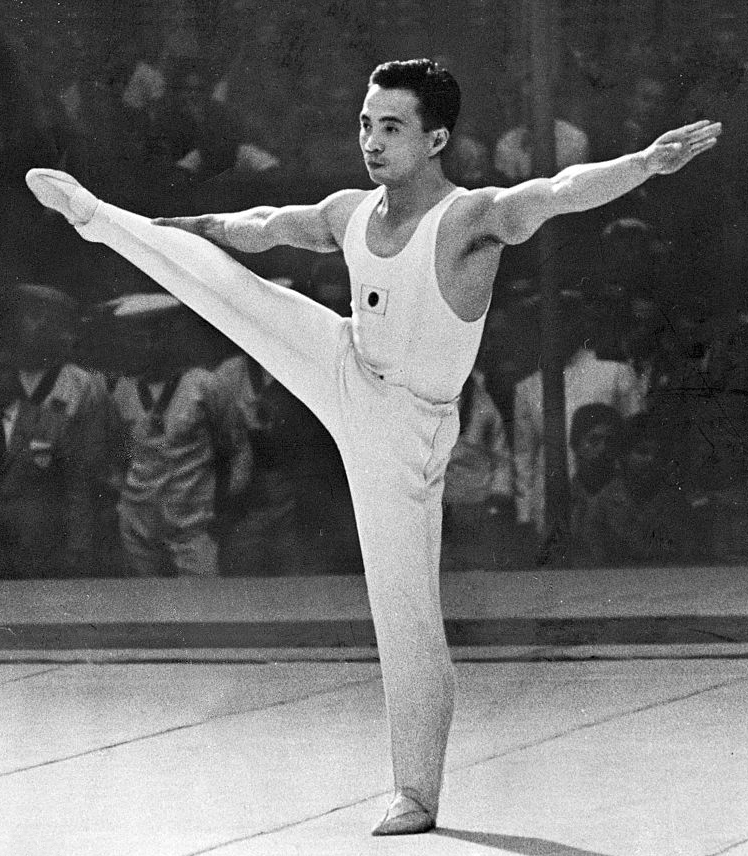
Nobuyuki Aihara, 1960

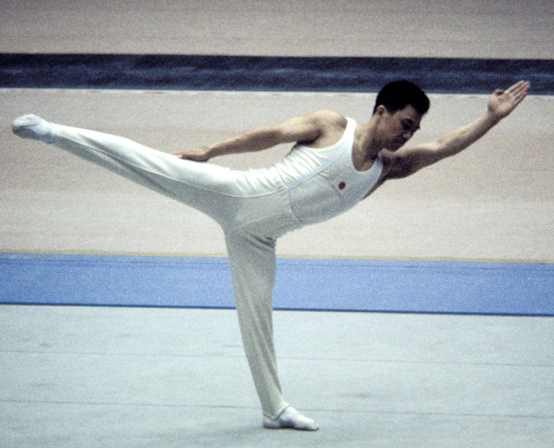
Takashi Ono, 1964

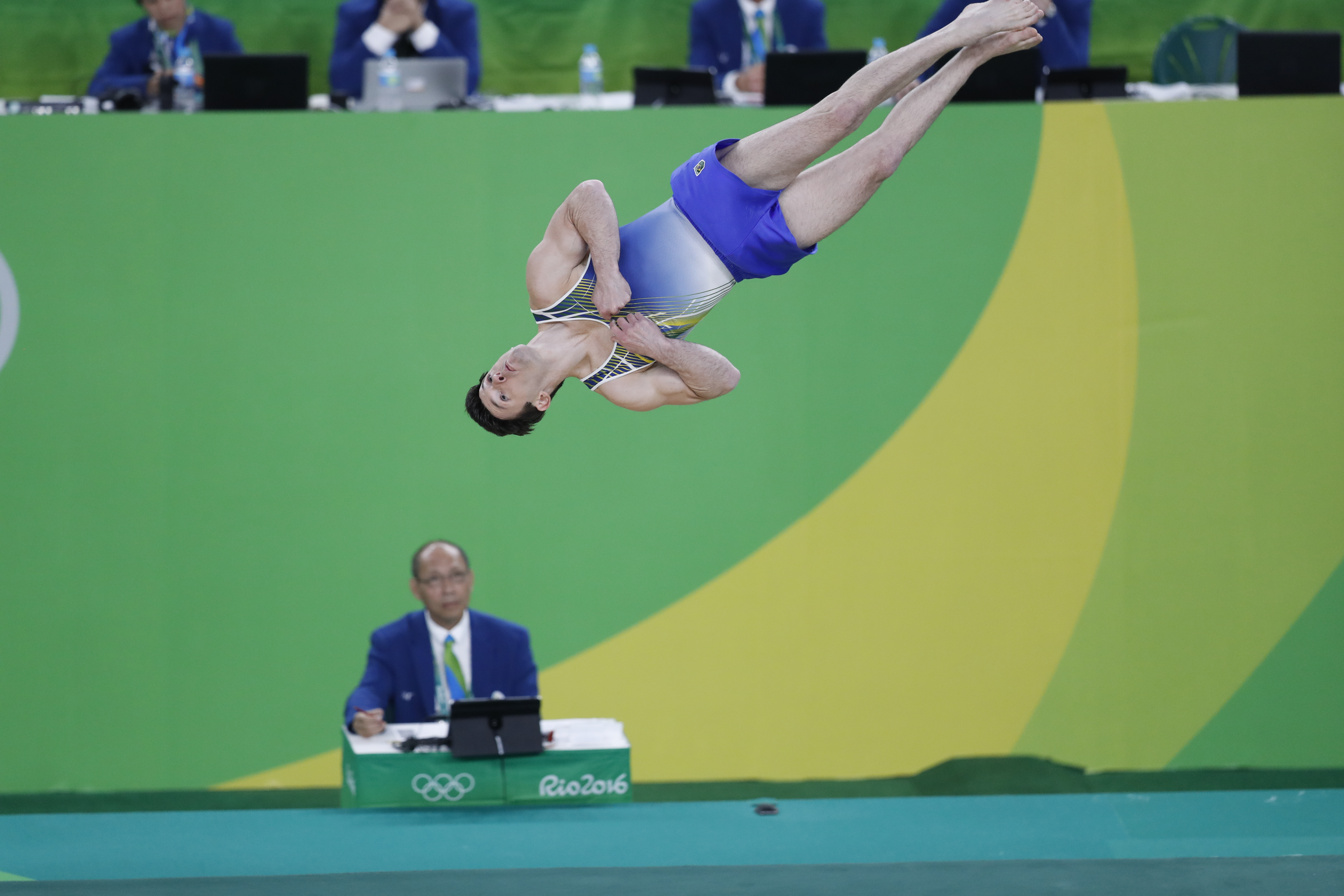
Diego Hypólito, 2016

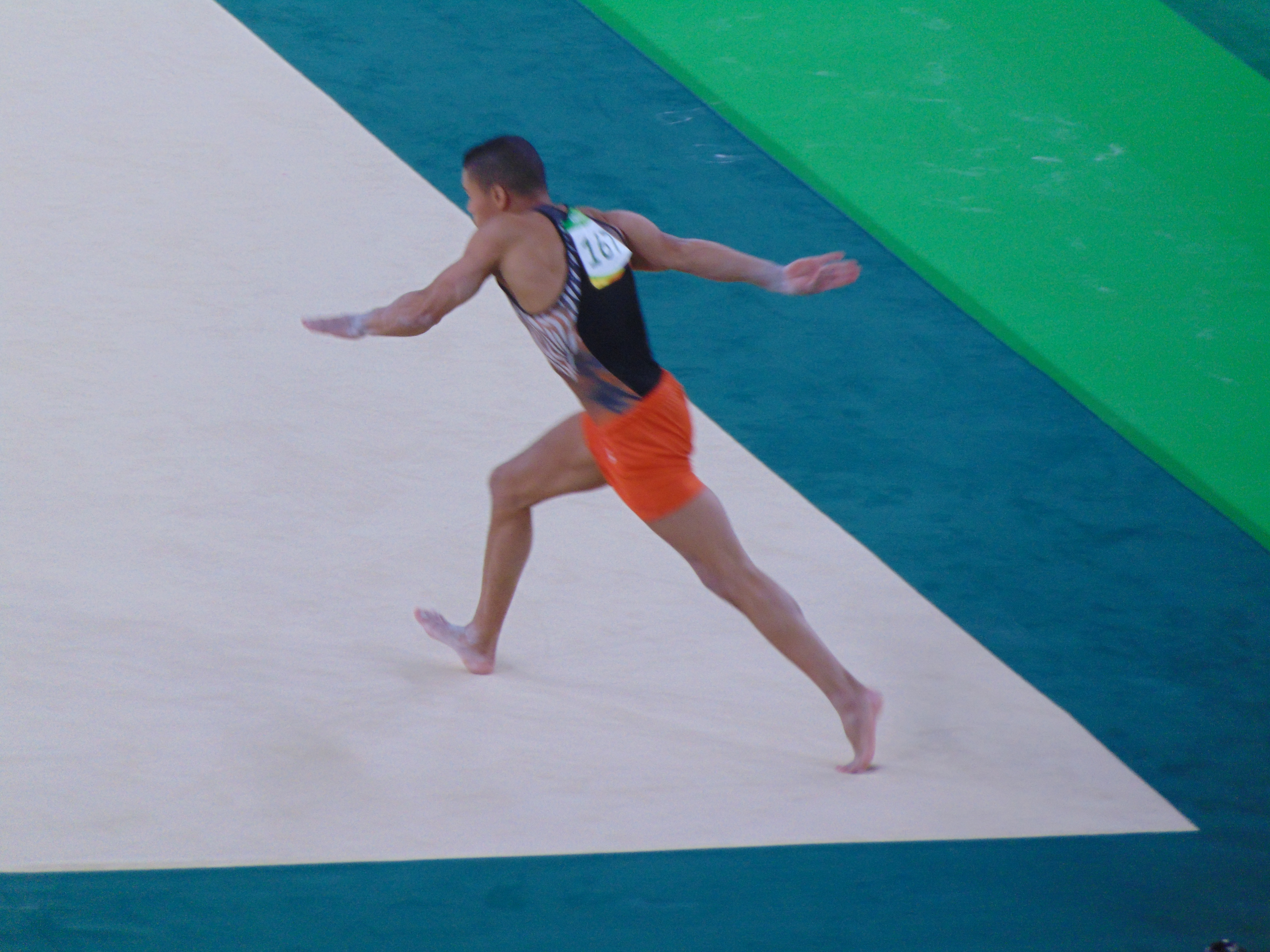
Jeffrey Wammes, 2016

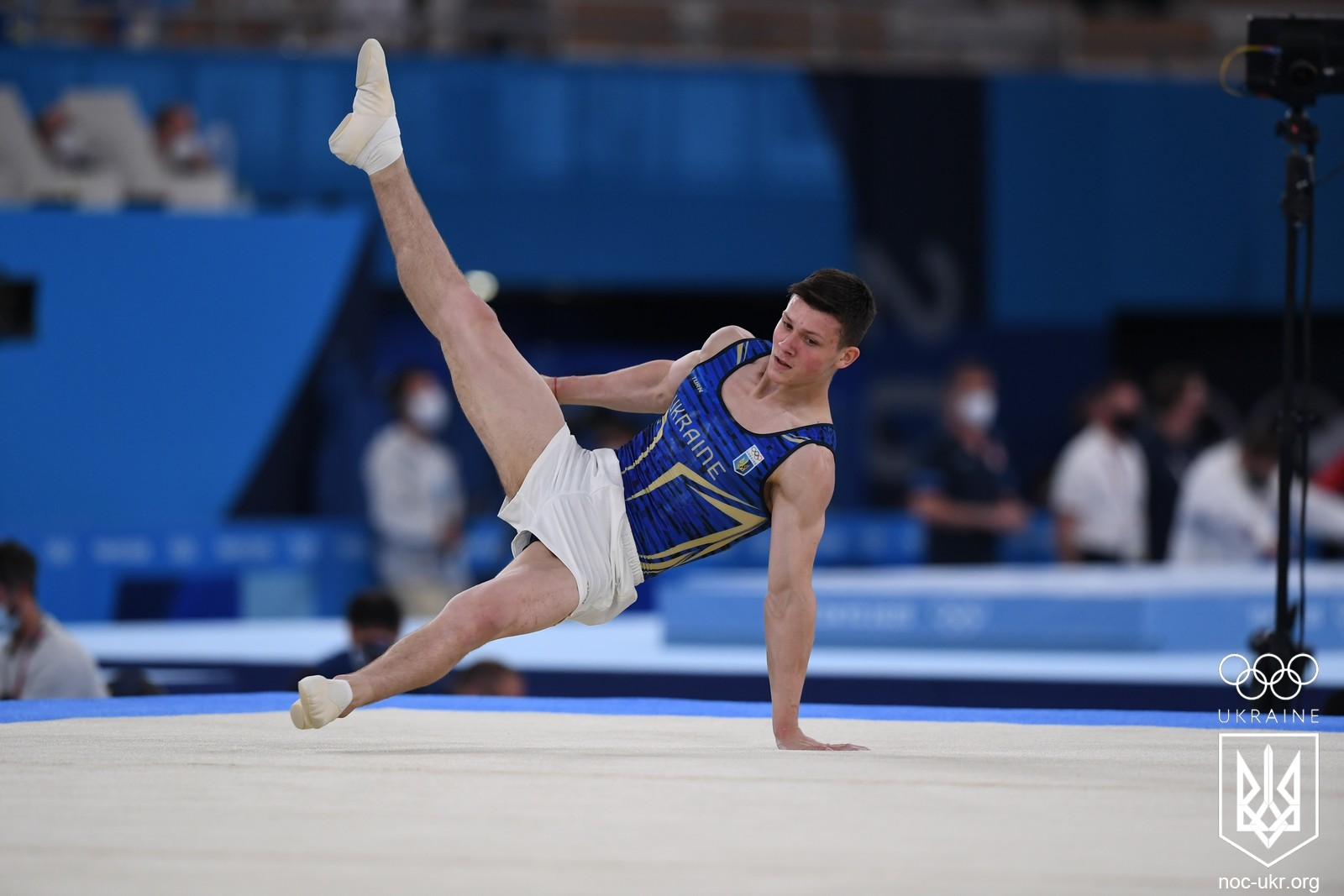
Illia Kovtun, 2020

Men's Floor at the Olympics

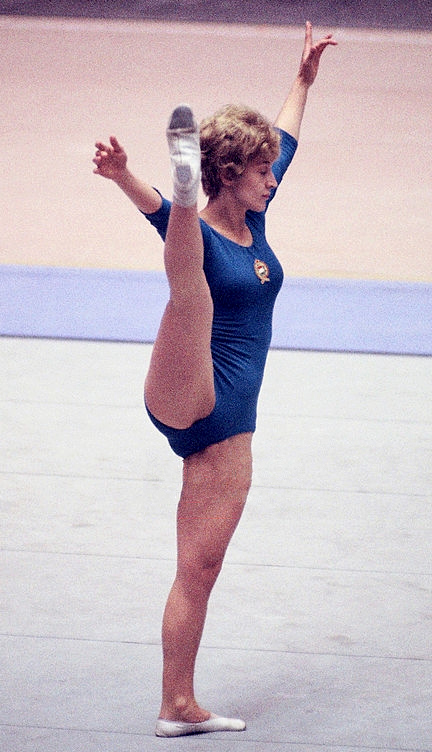
Anikó Ducza, 1964

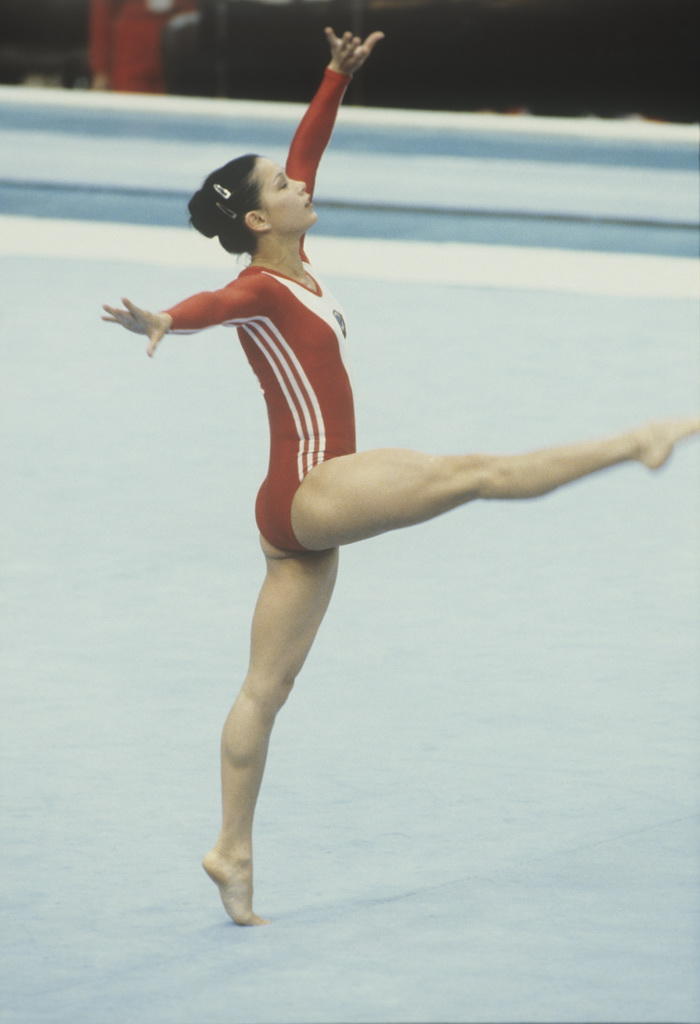
Nellie Kim, 1980

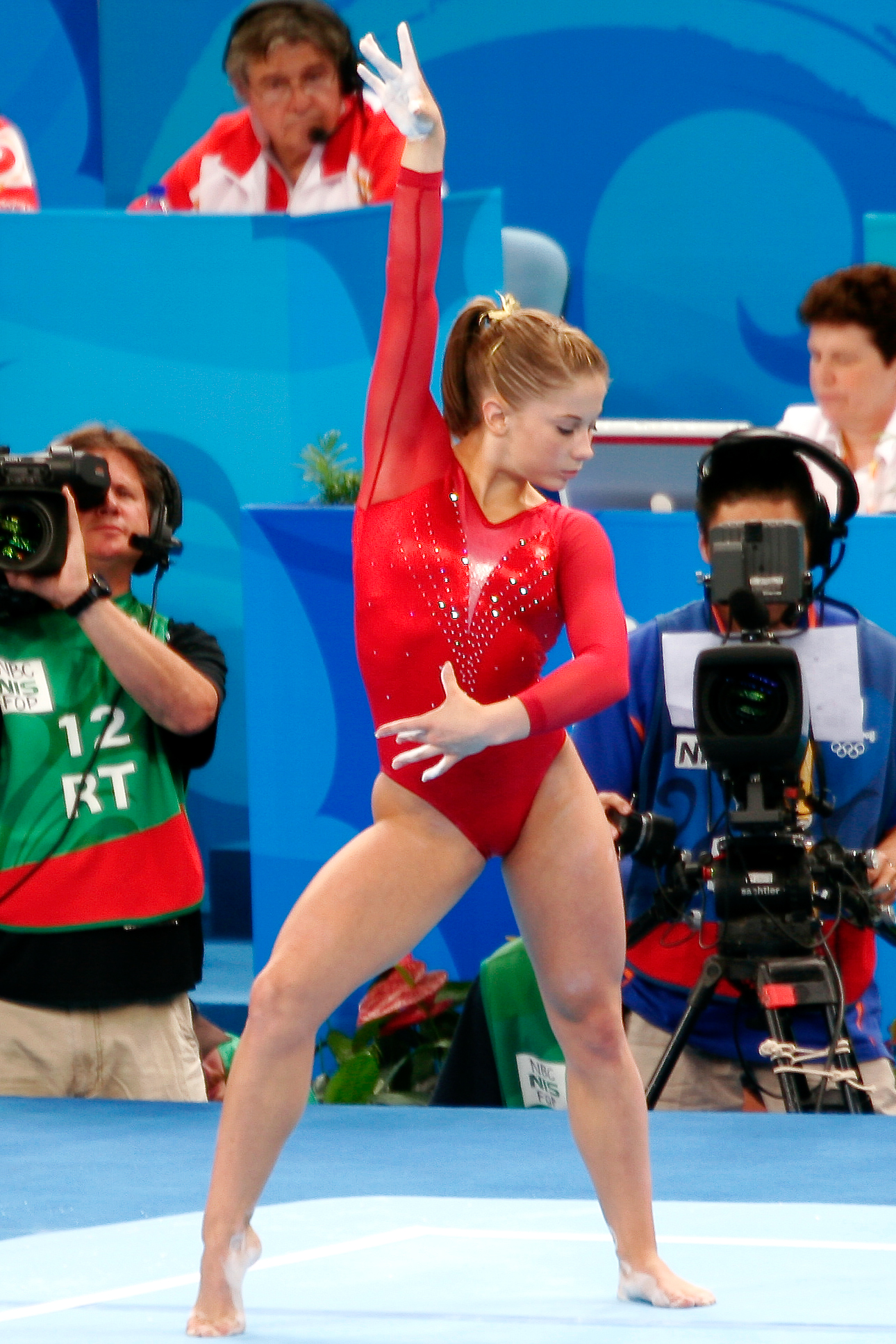
Shawn Johnson, 2008

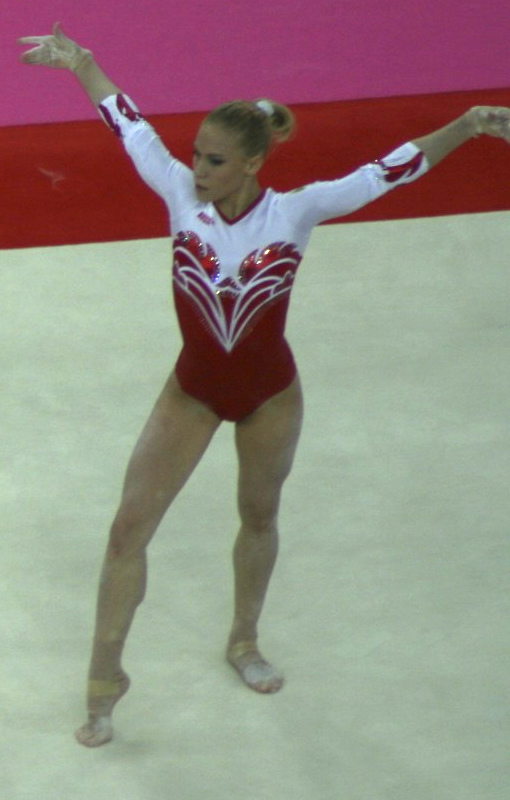
Ksenia Afanasyeva, 2012

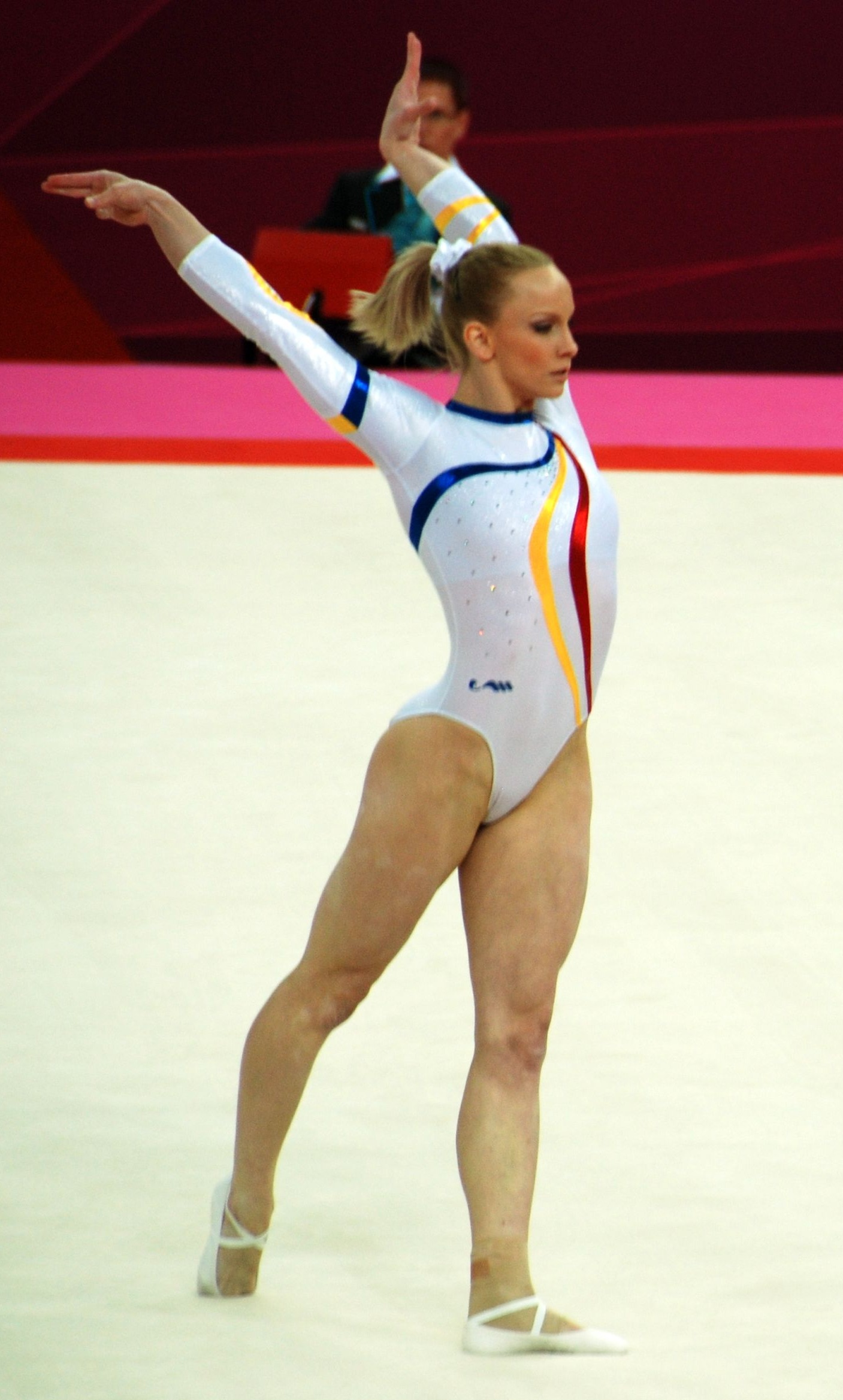
Sandra Izbașa, 2012

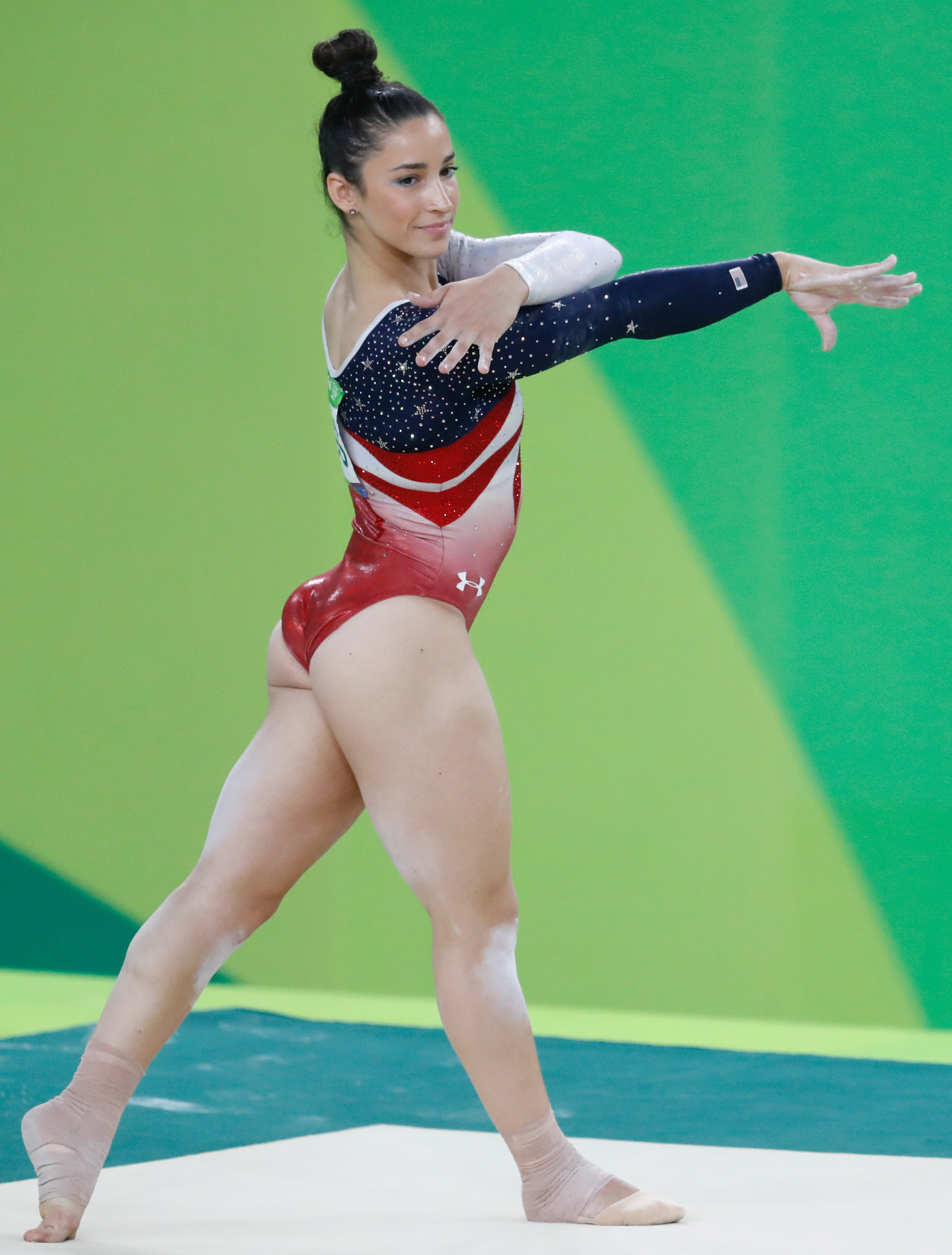
Aly Raisman, 2016

Women's Floor at the Olympics
