= Finland at the 1932 Summer Olympics =

- IOC code: FIN
- NOC: Finnish Olympic Committee

in Los Angeles
- Competitors: 40 (40 men, 0 women) in 5 sports
- Flag bearer: Akilles Järvinen
- Medals Ranked 7th: Gold 5 Silver 8 Bronze 12 Total 25

Summer Olympics appearances (overview)
- 1908; 1912; 1920; 1924; 1928; 1932; 1936; 1948; 1952; 1956; 1960; 1964; 1968; 1972; 1976; 1980; 1984; 1988; 1992; 1996; 2000; 2004; 2008; 2012; 2016; 2020; 2024; 2028

Other related appearances
- 1906 Intercalated Games

Finland competed at the 1932 Summer Olympics in Los Angeles, California, United States.

== Medalists ==
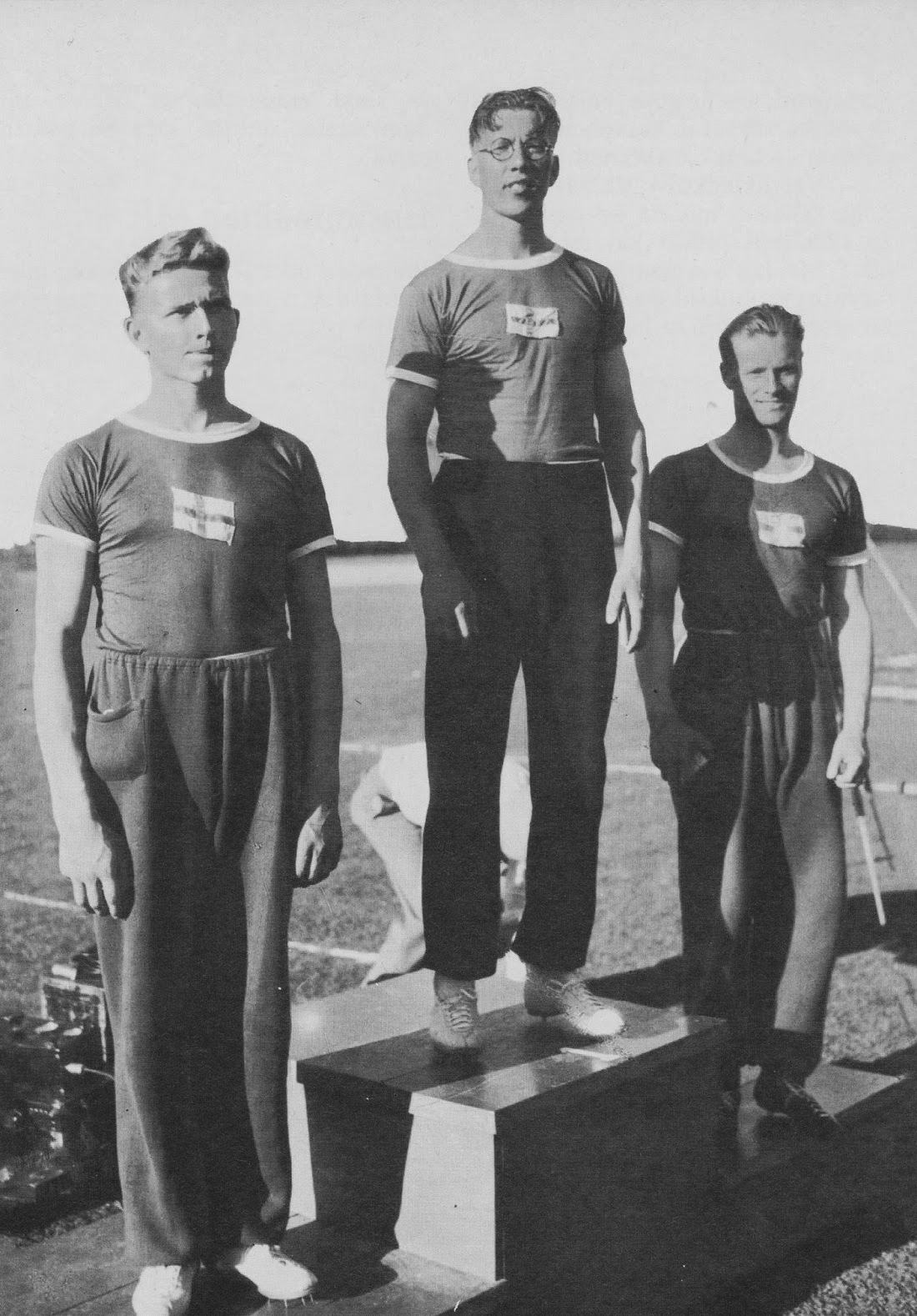
Finland's triple victory in the javelin, Matti Sippala, Matti Järvinen and Eino Penttilä

Medal	Name	Sport	Event
Bronze	Bruno Ahlberg	Boxing	Men's Welterweight
Silver	Heikki Savolainen	Gymnastics	Men's Horizontal Bar
Bronze	Heikki Savolainen	Gymnastics	Men's All-Around
Bronze	Heikki Savolainen	Gymnastics	Men's Parallel Bars
Bronze	Einari Teräsvirta	Gymnastics	Men's Horizontal Bar
Bronze	Einari Teräsvirta; Heikki Savolainen; Martti Uosikkinen; Mauri Nyberg-Noroma; Veikko Pakarinen	Gymnastics	Men's Team
Gold	Volmari Iso-Hollo	Athletics	Men's 3000m Steeplechase
Gold	Lauri Lehtinen	Athletics	Men's 5000m
Gold	Matti Järvinen	Athletics	Men's Javelin
Silver	Matti Sippala	Athletics	Men's Javelin
Silver	Ville Pörhölä	Athletics	Men's Hammer Throw
Silver	Volmari Iso-Hollo	Athletics	Men's 10000m
Silver	Akilles Järvinen	Athletics	Men's Decathlon
Bronze	Lauri Virtanen	Athletics	Men's 5000m
Bronze	Eino Penttilä	Athletics	Men's Javelin
Bronze	Armas Toivonen	Athletics	Men's Marathon
Bronze	Lauri Virtanen	Athletics	Men's 10000m
Gold	Hermanni Pihlajamäki	Wrestling	Men's 61 kg Freestyle
Gold	Väinö Kokkinen	Wrestling	Men's 79 kg Greco-Roman
Silver	Kyösti Luukko	Wrestling	Men's 79 kg Freestyle
Silver	Väinö Kajander	Wrestling	Men's 72 kg Greco-Roman
Silver	Onni Pellinen	Wrestling	Men's 87 kg Greco-Roman
Bronze	Aatos Jaskari	Wrestling	Men's 56 kg Freestyle
Bronze	Eino Leino	Wrestling	Men's 72 kg Freestyle
Bronze	Lauri Koskela	Wrestling	Men's 61 kg Greco-Roman

== Swimming ==
Men

Athlete	Event	Heat		Semifinal		Final	
Athlete	Event	Time	Rank	Time	Rank	Time	Rank
Toivo Reingoldt	200 m breaststroke	2:53.6	6 Q	2:54.9	9	Did not advance	
