= Peter Boros =

Peter Boros may refer to:

- Péter Boros (1908–1976), Hungarian gymnast
- Peter Boroš (born 1980), Slovak footballer

== See also ==
- Péter Boross (born 1928), Hungarian politician
