= Uosikkinen =

David Uosikkinen is a surname. Notable people with the surname include:

- David Uosikkinen (born 1956), American drummer
- Martti Uosikkinen (1909–1940), Finnish gymnast
