= 1931 World Artistic Gymnastics Championships =

Gymnastics competition

- Location: Paris, France

On the occasion of the 50th anniversary of the founding of the International Federation of Gymnastics which was founded in 1881, a commemorative competition was held in Paris, on July 11 & 12, in conjunction with that year's Bastille Day.

There seems to be a history of inconsistency from the FIG regarding whether these 1931 games are considered to be a World Championships. About these games, it is written in a 100-year Anniversary publication, that Following "agreements, objections, and discussions" this manifestation was called "World Championships"., however on the following page of that same publication, it is stated "Logically, the manifestations of the 50th anniversary of the FIG cannot be placed among the official competitions",. Additionally, in a 125-year Anniversary Publication, it is said about these games "Premiers concours sous l’appellation Championnats du Monde de Gymnastique artistique masculine a Paris.", yet they were referred to as "unofficial" and their results were omitted from the results section of that book. As it currently stands (as of as recently as 2021), about these games in 1931, the FIG states “1931 First Artistic Men's World Championships held in Paris.”

44 individuals from 10 nations participated in this competition. 14 events were contested. Individual rankings were determined.

== Men's individual all around ==
=== Rankings ===
Ranking	Country	Gymnast	Score
1	Finland	Heikki Savoleinen	185.000
2	Czechoslovakia	Alois Hudec	183.626
3	Czechoslovakia	Jan Gajdoš	183.233
4	France	Georges Leroux	179.655
5	Italy	Romeo Neri	177.763
6	Switzerland	Hermann Hänggi	176.916
7	Hungary	István Pelle	176.715
8	Switzerland	Georges Miez	176.546
9	Yugoslavia	Josip Primožič	175.880
10	Yugoslavia	Leon Štukelj	175.509
11	Czechoslovakia	Jindřich Tintěra	173.560
12	Switzerland	?? Büllmann	170.495
13	Czechoslovakia	Ladislav Tikal	170.023
14	Czechoslovakia	Bedrich Supcik	169.55
15	Switzerland	Josef (?) Walter	169.44
16	Yugoslavia	Peter Šumi	168.55
17	Yugoslavia	Boris Gregorka	166.93
18	Luxembourg	Mathias Logelin	16?.??
19	France or Algeria???	? Rizo	162.86
20	Yugoslavia	Miroslav Forte	161.69
21	Netherlands	Pieter (?) van Dam	159.09

=== Medalists ===
There was a special clause to the rules that in order for any individual to be properly termed 'World Champion', they had to demonstrate a certain level of competency among all 14 events, scoring at least 60% of all of the points that could be possibly awarded on each event. Therefore, the highest-ranking gymnast, Heikki Savolainen of Finland did not actually end up becoming World Champion; rather, 2nd-place finishing Alois Hudec of Czechoslovakia, who was the only individual to score at least 60% on all 14 events, ended up becoming 'World Champion' at this competition.

Medal	Country	Gymnast
Gold medal	Czechoslovakia	Alois Hudec

== Men's floor exercise ==
Medal	Country	Gymnast
Gold medal	Czechoslovakia	Alois Hudec

== Men's rings ==
Medal	Country	Gymnast
Gold medal	Czechoslovakia	Alois Hudec

== Men's vault ==
Medal	Country	Gymnast
Gold medal	Switzerland	Hermann Hänggi

== Men's parallel bars ==
Medal	Country	Gymnast
Gold medal	Hungary	István Pelle

== Men's horizontal bar ==
Medal	Country	Gymnast
Gold medal	Finland	Heikki Savolainen
