= Nicolò Tronci =

Italian gymnast

- Full name: Nicolò Giovanni Battista Emilio Tronci
- Born: 6 April 1905 Genoa, Kingdom of Italy
- Died: 13 January 1986 (aged 80) Genoa, Italy

Gymnastics career
- Discipline: Men's artistic gymnastics
- Country represented: Italy
- Club: Società Ginnastica Ligure Cristoforo Colombo

Nicolò Giovanni Battista Emilio Tronci (6 April 1905 – 13 January 1986) was an Italian gymnast. He competed in eight events at the 1936 Summer Olympics.
