= Gianfranco Marzolla =

Italian artistic gymnast

- Born: 9 January 1937 (age 89) Porto Viro, Kingdom of Italy

Gymnastics career
- Discipline: Men's artistic gymnastics
- Country represented: Italy
Medal record
Men's artistic gymnastics
Representing Italy
Olympic Games
| Bronze medal – third place | 1960 Rome | Team |

Gianfranco Marzolla (born 9 January 1937) was an Italian gymnast.

He won the bronze medal in all-around with the Italy national team at the 1960 Summer Olympics.
