= Otello Ternelli =

Italian gymnast

- Born: 23 November 1912 Modena, Kingdom of Italy
- Died: 28 January 1974 (aged 61) Modena, Italy

Gymnastics career
- Discipline: Men's artistic gymnastics
- Country represented: Italy

Otello Ternelli (23 November 1912 – 28 January 1974) was an Italian gymnast. He competed in eight events at the 1936 Summer Olympics.
