= Bruno Franceschetti =

Italian artistic gymnast (1941–2025)

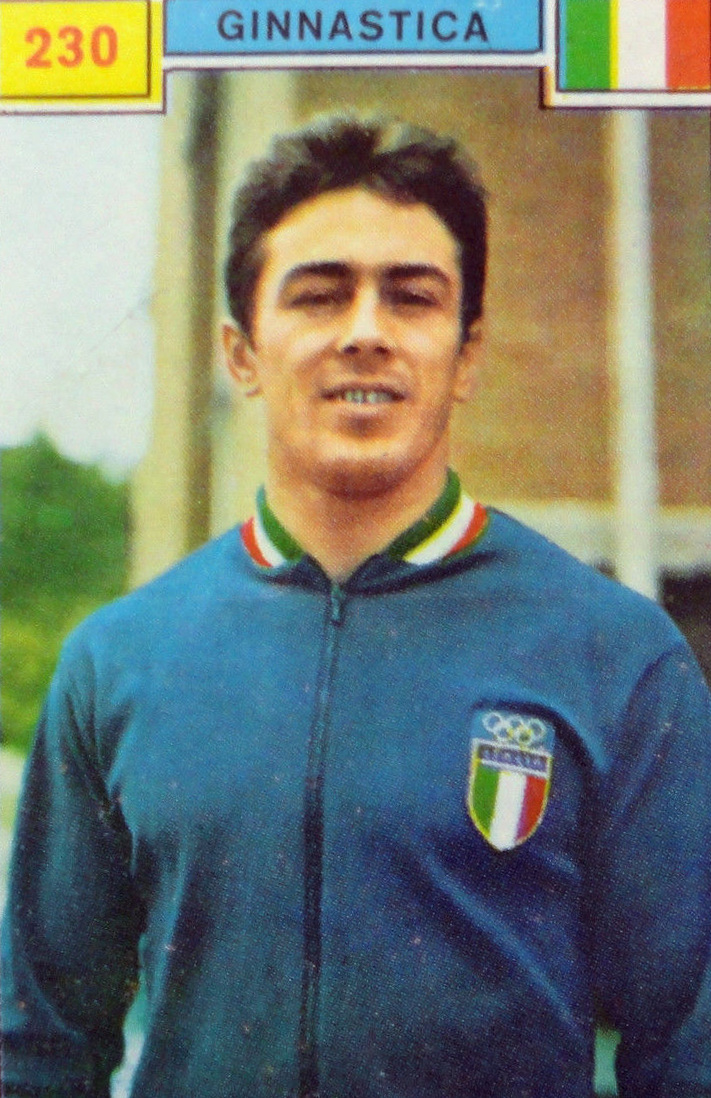

Personal information
- Born: 30 April 1941 Minerbe, Italy
- Died: 15 May 2025 (aged 84) Varese, Italy
- Height: 1.66 m (5 ft 5 in)

Gymnastics career
- Discipline: Men's artistic gymnastics
- Country represented: Italy
- Club: Ginnastica Robur et Fides, Gruppo Sportivo Vigili del Fuoco "Giancarlo Brunetti" Roma

Bruno Franceschetti (30 April 1941 – 15 May 2025) was an Italian gymnast. He competed at the 1964 and 1968 Olympics in all of the artistic gymnastics events and finished in 4th and 12th place with the Italian team, respectively. His best individual result was 36th place on the pommel horse in 1968. Franceschetti won a gold medal with the Italian team at the 1967 Mediterranean Games.

After retiring from competition, Franceschetti worked as a gymnastics coach. Jury Chechi was one of his trainees.

Franchetti died on 15 May 2025, at the age of 84.
