= Luigi Cimnaghi =

Italian sports administrator and gymnast (1940–2024)

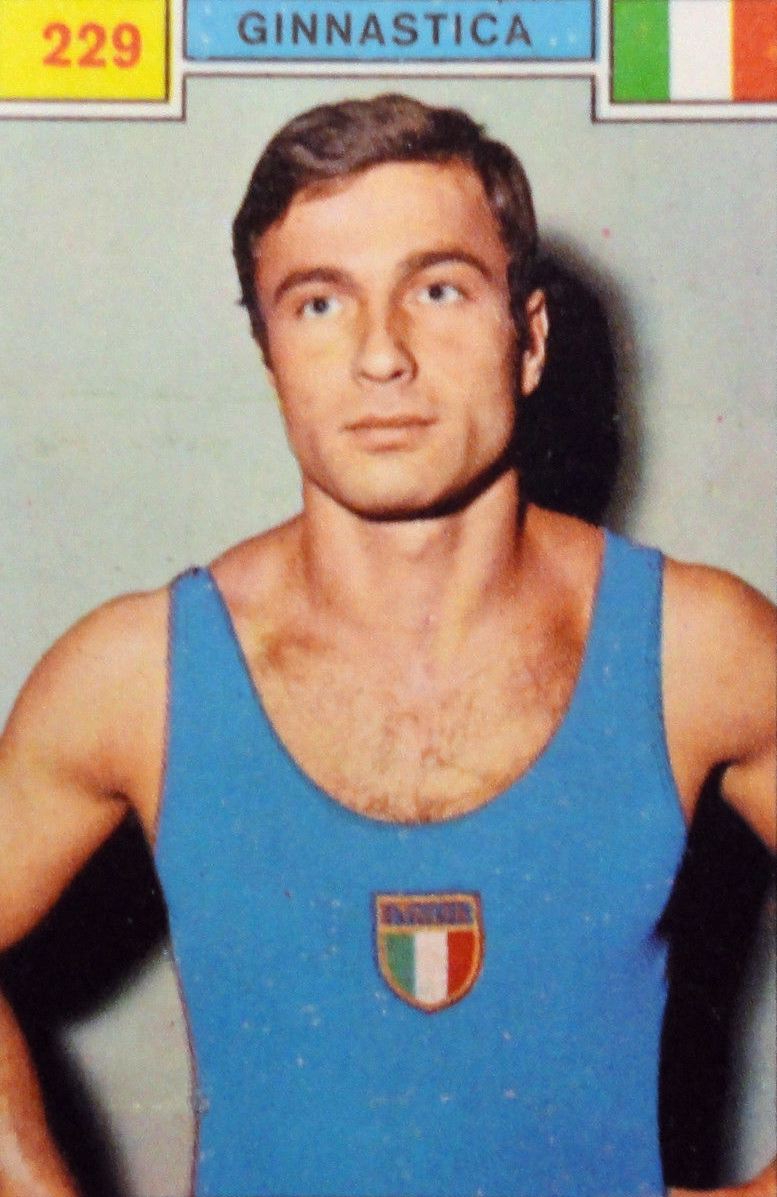

Personal information
- Born: 10 August 1940 Meda, Lombardy, Kingdom of Italy
- Died: 22 March 2024 (aged 83)
- Height: 1.70 m (5 ft 7 in)

Gymnastics career
- Discipline: Men's artistic gymnastics
- Country represented: Italy
- Gym: Gruppo Sportivo Oratorio Sampietrina

Luigi Cimnaghi (10 August 1940 – 22 March 2024) was an Italian sports administrator and gymnast. He competed at the 1964 and 1968 Olympics in all artistic gymnastics events and finished in 4th and 12th place with the Italian team, respectively. His best individual result was 14th place on the parallel bars in 1964. He won gold medals with the Italian team at the 1963 and 1967 Mediterranean Games, as well as four individual medals in 1967: two silvers, on the parallel bars and vault, and two bronze medals, all-around and on the horizontal bar.

After retiring from competitions Cimnaghi worked as a sports administrator. As a member of the European Union of Gymnastics he oversaw international junior competitions from 1984 to 1989. In 1988 he served as the chef de mission with the Italian Paralympic Team at the Nagano Winter Olympics, and in 1999-2004 worked as the manager of the Stadio Olimpico in Rome. Cimnaghi was a member of the organizing committees of the 1981 European Men's Artistic Gymnastics Championships, 1998 FEI World Equestrian Games, 2006 Winter Olympics and 2009 Mediterranean Games. Cimnaghi died on 22 March 2024, at the age of 83.
