= Angelo Vicardi =

Italian artistic gymnast

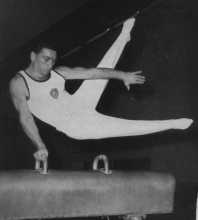
- Vicardi c. 1960

Personal information
- Born: 9 October 1936 Melegnano, Kingdom of Italy
- Died: 1 January 2006 (aged 69) Melegnano, Italy

Gymnastics career
- Discipline: Men's artistic gymnastics
- Country represented: Italy
- Club: Gruppo Sportivo "Carlo Galimberti" Vigili del Fuoco
Medal record
Men's artistic gymnastics
Representing Italy
Olympic Games
Bronze medal – third place	1960 Rome	Team

Angelo Vicardi (9 October 1936 – 1 January 2006) was an Italian gymnast. He won the bronze medal in the team final at the 1960 Summer Olympics. He participated in the 1964 Olympics as well, though he received no medals.
