= Marcello Barbieri (gymnast) =

Italian gymnast

- Born: 13 February 1971 (age 55) Modena, Italy
- Height: 1.70 m (5 ft 7 in)

Gymnastics career
- Discipline: Men's artistic gymnastics
- Country represented: Italy
- Gym: Casati Arcore

Marcello Barbieri (born 13 February 1971) is an Italian gymnast. He competed at the 1996 Summer Olympics.
