= Gymnastics at the 1932 Summer Olympics =

Gymnastics at the Games of the X Olympiad
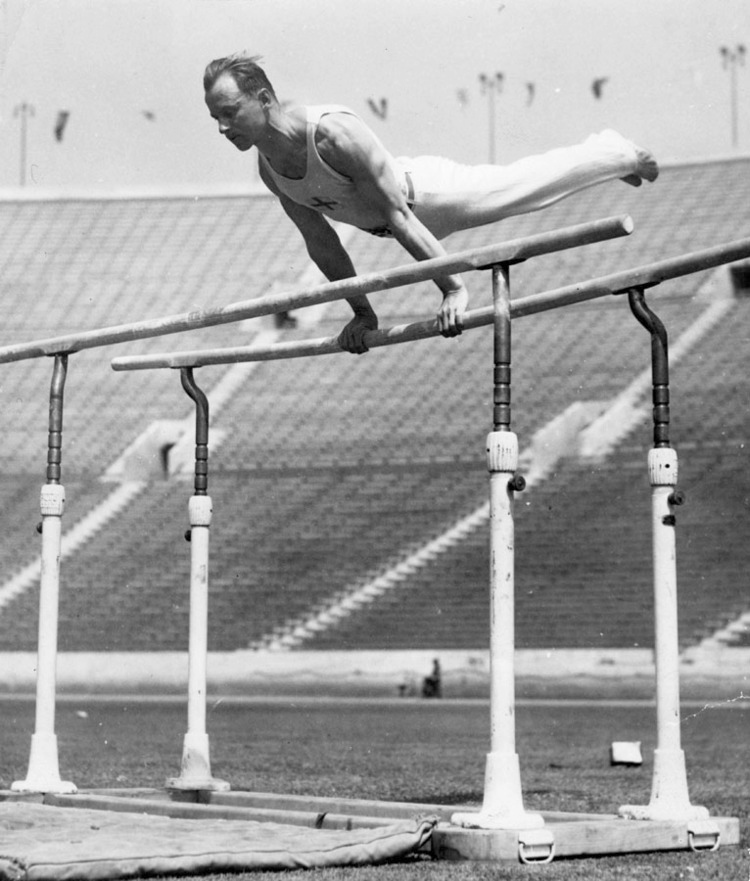
- Heikki Savolainen
- Venue: Olympic Stadium
- Dates: 8–12 August 1932

At the 1932 Summer Olympics in Los Angeles, eleven events in gymnastics were contested. The competitions were held from Monday, August 8, 1932 to Friday, August 12, 1932.

== Medal summary ==
Games	Gold	Silver	Bronze
All-Around, Individual	Romeo Neri; Italy	István Pelle; Hungary	Heikki Savolainen; Finland
All-Around, Team	Italy; Oreste Capuzzo; Savino Guglielmetti; Mario Lertora; Romeo Neri; Franco Tognini	United States; Frank Haubold; Frank Cumiskey; Al Jochim; Fred Meyer; Michael Schuler	Finland; Mauri Nyberg-Noroma; Ilmari Pakarinen; Heikki Savolainen; Einari Teräsvirta; Martti Uosikkinen
Floor exercise	István Pelle; Hungary	Georges Miez; Switzerland	Mario Lertora; Italy
Horizontal bar	Dallas Bixler; United States	Heikki Savolainen; Finland	Einari Teräsvirta; Finland
Indian clubs	George Roth; United States	Philip Erenberg; United States	William Kuhlemeier; United States
Parallel bars	Romeo Neri; Italy	István Pelle; Hungary	Heikki Savolainen; Finland
Pommel horse	István Pelle; Hungary	Omero Bonoli; Italy	Frank Haubold; United States
Rings	George Gulack; United States	Bill Denton; United States	Giovanni Lattuada; Italy
Rope climbing	Raymond Bass; United States	William Galbraith; United States	Thomas F. Connolly; United States
Tumbling	Rowland Wolfe; United States	Ed Gross; United States	William Herrmann; United States
Vault	Savino Guglielmetti; Italy	Al Jochim; United States	Ed Carmichael; United States

== Participating nations ==
A total of 46 gymnasts from seven nations competed at the Los Angeles Games:

- Finland (5)
- Hungary (4)
- Italy (7)
- Japan (6)
- Mexico (4)
- Switzerland (1)
- United States (20)

== Medal table ==
Rank	Nation	Gold	Silver	Bronze	Total
1	United States	5	6	5	16
2	Italy	4	1	2	7
3	Hungary	2	2	0	4
4	Finland	0	1	4	5
5	Switzerland	0	1	0	1
Totals (5 entries)		11	11	11	33

== Sources ==
- The Official Report of the Organizing Committee for the Games of the XV Olympiad. Porvoo: Werner Södreström Osakeyhtiö. 1955. Archived from the original on 2007-06-12.
- "Olympic Medal Winners". International Olympic Committee.
