= Toshihiko Sasano =

Japanese gymnast

- 佐々野 利彦
- Born: 2 November 1911 Fukue, Yamaguchi, Empire of Japan
- Died: 1975 (aged 63–64)

Gymnastics career
- Discipline: Men's artistic gymnastics
- Country represented: Japan
- Gym: Japan Gymnastics School

Toshihiko Sasano (佐々野利彦, Sasano Toshihiko; born 2 November 1911, date of death unknown) was a Japanese gymnast. He competed in Gymnastics at the 1932 Summer Olympics including the men's floor, parallel bars and rings.
