= Shigeo Homma =

Japanese gymnast

- 本間 茂雄
- Born: 19 April 1904 Sado, Niigata, Empire of Japan
- Died: 3 November 1974 (aged 70)

Gymnastics career
- Discipline: Men's artistic gymnastics
- Country represented: Japan
- Gym: Tokyo University of Science

Shigeo Homma (本間茂雄, Homma Shigeo; 19 April 1904 – 3 November 1974) was a Japanese gymnast. He competed in three events at the 1932 Summer Olympics.
