= Mario Lertora =

Italian artistic gymnast (1897–1939)

- Full name: Mario Lavinio Lertora
- Born: 27 August 1897 Genoa, Kingdom of Italy
- Died: 28 March 1939 (aged 41) Genoa, Kingdom of Italy
- Height: 1.65 m (5 ft 5 in)

Gymnastics career
- Discipline: Men's artistic gymnastics
- Country represented: Italy
- Club: Società Ginnastica Ligure Cristoforo Colombo
Medal record
Men's artistic gymnastics
Representing Kingdom of Italy
Olympic Games
| Gold medal – first place | 1924 Paris | Team |
| Gold medal – first place | 1932 Los Angeles | Team |
| Bronze medal – third place | 1932 Los Angeles | Floor |

Mario Lavinio Lertora (27 August 1897 – 28 March 1939) was an Italian artistic gymnast who competed in the 1924 Summer Olympics, in the 1928 Summer Olympics, and in the 1932 Summer Olympics.

In 1924, he was a member of the Italian team which won the gold medal in the team all-around event. In the 1924 Summer Olympics, he also participated in the following events:

- parallel bars - fifth place
- all-around - tenth place
- rope climbing - tenth place
- horizontal bar - twelfth place
- rings - 15th place
- pommel horse - 29th place
- sidehorse vault - 32nd place
- vault - 34th place

In 1932, he was part of the Italian team which won the gold medal in the team all-around event. He also won a bronze medal in the floor competition.

In the 1932 Summer Olympics he also participated in the following events:

- all-around - fourth place
- parallel bars - fifth place
- vault - eighth place
