= Takashi Kondo (gymnast) =

Japanese gymnast

- 近藤 天
- Born: 29 October 1911 Kanda, Tokyo, Empire of Japan
- Died: 23 January 1994 (aged 82)

Gymnastics career
- Discipline: Men's artistic gymnastics
- Country represented: Japan

Takashi Kondo (近藤天, Kondō Takashi; 29 October 1911 – 23 January 1994) was a Japanese gymnast. He competed in four events at the 1932 Summer Olympics.
