= Georges Miez =

Swiss gymnast

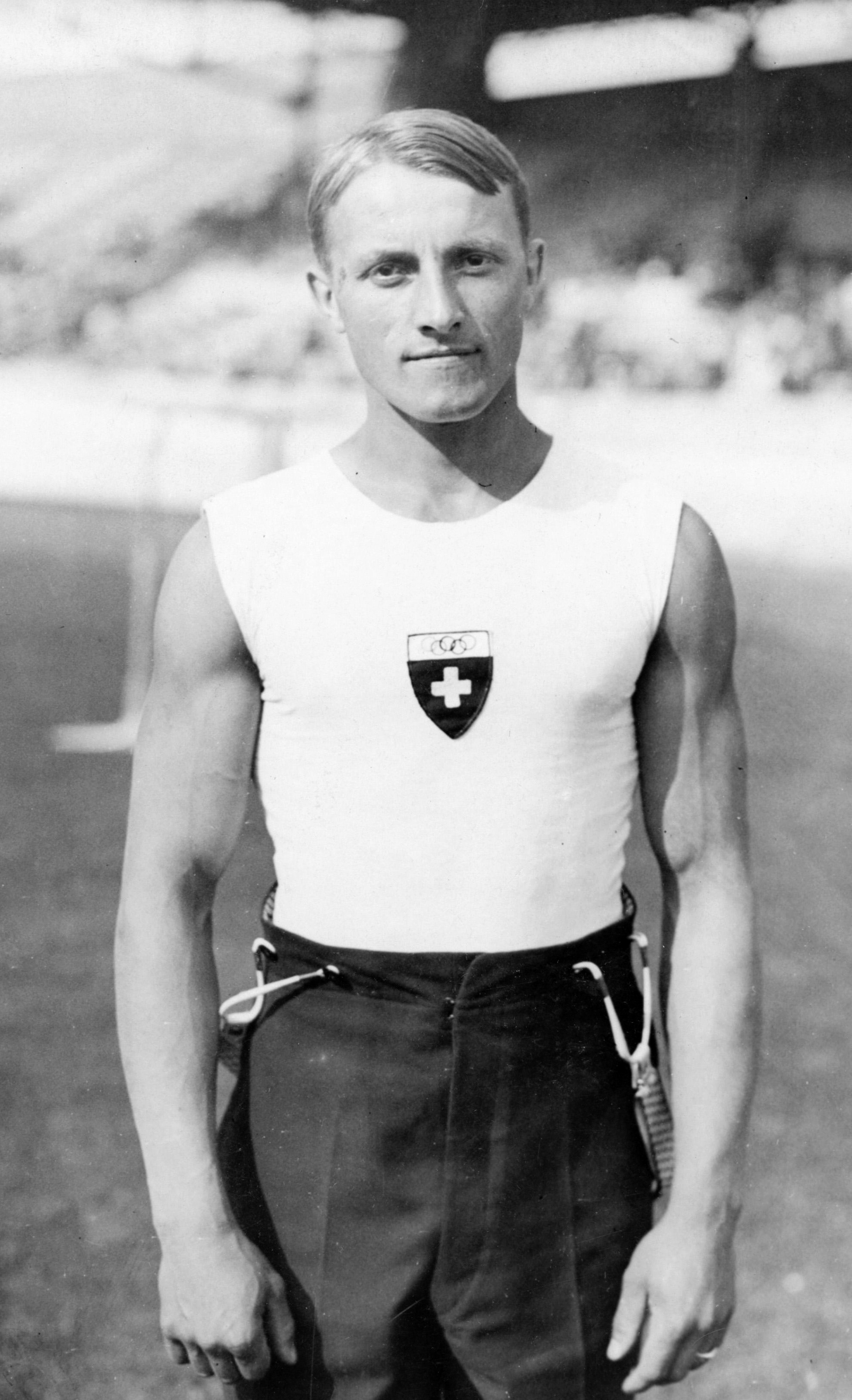
- Miez at the 1928 Olympics

Personal information
- Born: 2 October 1904 Töss, Switzerland
- Died: 17 April 1999 (aged 94) Savosa, Switzerland

Gymnastics career
- Discipline: Men's artistic gymnastics
- Country represented: Switzerland
- Club: TV Töss, Winterthur
Medal record
Olympic Games
Gold medal – first place	1928 Amsterdam	Team
Gold medal – first place	1928 Amsterdam	All-around
Gold medal – first place	1928 Amsterdam	Horizontal bar
Gold medal – first place	1936 Berlin	Floor
Silver medal – second place	1928 Amsterdam	Pommel horse
Silver medal – second place	1932 Los Angeles	Floor
Silver medal – second place	1936 Berlin	Team
Bronze medal – third place	1924 Paris	Team
World Championships
Gold medal – first place	1934 Budapest	Team
Gold medal – first place	1934 Budapest	Floor
Silver medal – second place	1934 Budapest	Horizontal bar

Georges Miez (2 October 1904 – 21 April 1999) was a Swiss gymnast. He competed at the 1924, 1928, 1932 and 1936 Summer Olympics, winning a total of four gold, three silver and one bronze medals. Miez was the most successful athlete of the 1928 Games, whereas in 1932 he was the only medalist for Switzerland. Miez also won three medals at the 1934 World Championships.

Between the 1924 and 1928 Olympics Miez served in the Swiss army, coached gymnastics in the Netherlands, and worked for a Swiss sportswear company, where he designed a new type of gymnastic trousers. After that, he coached gymnastics in Chiasso. Switzerland did not send an Olympic team in 1932 due to the economic depression, but Miez volunteered to compete on his own and also returned the body of his brother who died in the United States. After winning a silver on the floor, Miez withdrew from the Games and toured the United States giving presentations at universities.

Miez retired after the 1936 Games and worked as a national gymnastics coach and then as a Red Cross official. After World War II he founded several private schools, wrote books on sports medicine, and coached tennis. He spent most of his late years in Lugano, where he died of a stroke aged 94.

== See also ==
- List of multiple Olympic gold medalists
- List of multiple Summer Olympic medalists
