= Yoshitaka Takeda =

Japanese gymnast

- 武田 義孝
- Born: 15 February 1911 Asakura, Ehime, Empire of Japan
- Died: August 1943 (aged 32)

Gymnastics career
- Discipline: Men's artistic gymnastics
- Country represented: Japan
- Gym: Japan Gymnastics School

Yoshitaka Takeda (武田義孝, Takeda Yoshitaka; 15 February 1911 – August 1943) was a Japanese gymnast. He competed at the 1932 Summer Olympics and the 1936 Summer Olympics. He died of kidney disease in August 1943.

== Olympic games positions ==
=== 1932 Summer Olympics ===
Discipline (Sport) / Event	Position
Individual All-Around, Men	23
Team All-Around, Men	5
Floor Exercise, Men	25

=== 1936 Summer Olympics ===
Discipline (Sport) / Event	Position
Individual All-Around, Men	43
Team All-Around, Men	9
Floor Exercise, Men	42
Horse Vault, Men	=31
Parallel Bars, Men	24
Horizontal Bar, Men	33
Rings, Men	67
Pommelled Horse, Men	67
