= József Hegedűs =

Hungarian gymnast

- Born: 7 January 1910 Újpest, Austria-Hungary
- Died: 7 August 1981 (aged 71) Budapest, Hungarian People's Republic

Gymnastics career
- Discipline: Men's artistic gymnastics
- Country represented: Hungary
- Club: Újpesti Tornaegylet

József Hegedűs (7 January 1910 – 7 August 1981) was a Hungarian gymnast. He competed at the 1932 Summer Olympics and the 1936 Summer Olympics.
