= Fred Meyer (gymnast) =

American gymnast (1910–1996)

- Full name: Frederick H. Meyer
- Born: August 9, 1910 New York City, New York, U.S.
- Died: October 1, 1996 (aged 86) Fairfax, Virginia, U.S.

Gymnastics career
- Discipline: Men's artistic gymnastics
- Country represented: United States
- Gym: New York Turnverein
Medal record
Men's artistic gymnastics
Representing United States
Event	1st	2nd	3rd
Olympic Games	0	1	0
Total	0	1	0
Olympic Games
Silver medal – second place	1932 Los Angeles	Team

Frederick H. Meyer (August 9, 1910 – October 1, 1996) was an American gymnast. He was a member of the United States men's national artistic gymnastics team and competed in the 1932 Summer Olympics and 1936 Summer Olympics.

As a gymnast, Meyer was a member of New York Turnverein.
