= Fujio Kakuta =

Japanese gymnast (1911–1938)

- 角田 不二夫
- Born: 27 January 1911 Shizuoka Prefecture, Empire of Japan
- Died: 1938 (aged 26–27)

Gymnastics career
- Discipline: Men's artistic gymnastics
- Country represented: Japan

Fujio Kakuta (角田不二夫, Kakuta Fujio; 27 January 1911 – 1938) was a Japanese gymnast. He competed at the 1932 Summer Olympics and the 1936 Summer Olympics.
