= Franco Tognini =

Italian artistic gymnast

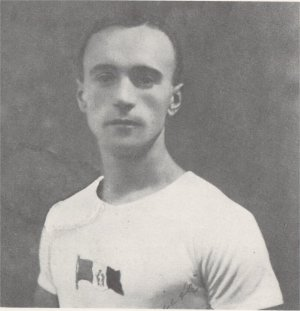

Personal information
- Full name: Gaudenzio Franco Tognini
- Born: 26 October 1907 Monza, Kingdom of Italy
- Died: 23 July 1980 (aged 72) Monza, Italy
- Height: 1.67 m (5 ft 6 in)

Gymnastics career
- Discipline: Men's artistic gymnastics
- Country represented: Italy
Medal record
Men's artistic gymnastics
Representing Kingdom of Italy
Olympic Games
Gold medal – first place	1932 Los Angeles	Team

Gaudenzio Franco Tognini (26 October 1907 – 23 July 1980) was an Italian gymnast who won a gold medal at the 1932 Summer Olympics. After two participations at the Summer Olympics (1932 and 1936), he was the coach of the Italy national team at the 1948 Summer Olympics.
