= Oreste Capuzzo =

Italian gymnast

Personal information
- Born: 7 December 1908 Rivarolo
- Died: 5 December 1985 (aged 76) Genoa

Gymnastics career
- Discipline: Men's artistic gymnastics
- Country represented: Italy
Medal record
Olympic Games
Gold medal – first place	1932 Los Angeles	Team

Oreste Capuzzo (7 December 1908 – 5 December 1985) was an Italian gymnast. He was born in Rivarolo and died in Genoa. He began competing in Milan in 1920. He won gold in the vault in the 1932 Summer Olympics in Los Angeles. He also competed in the 1936 Summer Olympics in Berlin. Capuzzo also took part in the 1934 World Championships in Budapest.
