= Frank Haubold =

American gymnast (1906–1985)

- Full name: Frank Otto Haubold
- Born: March 23, 1906 Union City, New Jersey, U.S.
- Died: March 1985 (aged 78–79) Ridgefield, New Jersey, U.S.
- Spouse: Irma Haubold

Gymnastics career
- Discipline: Men's artistic gymnastics
- Country represented: United States
- Gym: Swiss Turnverein
Medal record
Men's artistic gymnastics
Representing United States
| Event | 1st | 2nd | 3rd |
|---|---|---|---|
| Olympic Games | 0 | 1 | 1 |
| Total | 0 | 1 | 1 |
Olympic Games
| Silver medal – second place | 1932 Los Angeles | Team |
| Bronze medal – third place | 1932 Los Angeles | Pommel horse |

Frank Otto Haubold (March 23, 1906 – March 1985) was an American gymnast. He was a member of the United States men's national artistic gymnastics team and competed in the 1928 Summer Olympics, 1932 Summer Olympics, and 1936 Summer Olympics. Haubold and his wife, Irma, were the first married couple of compete in the same Olympics.

== Early life ==
Frank Otto Haubold was born March 23, 1906 Union City, New Jersey.

== Career ==
Haubold worked as a textile salesman, spending 46 years with the same company.

As a gymnast, Haubold was a member of the Swiss Turnverein in Union City, New Jersey. He was National Champion in the all-around in 1931-32, and won national titles on the parallel bars and the pommel horse, the latter being his best event. He was the top American in the all-around event at the 1932 Summer Olympics.

Haubold was married to Irma "Chip" Haubold, who was also from Union City. They were the first married couple to compete in the same Olympics. Their lives were documented in the 2012 film, Frank & Chip: The Olympic Experience.

== Death ==
Haubold died March 1985 in Ridgefield, New Jersey.
