= Romeo Neri =

Italian gymnast (1903–1961)

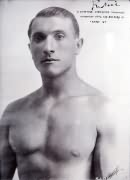
- Romeo Neri

Personal information
- Born: 26 March 1903 Rimini, Kingdom of Italy
- Died: 23 September 1961 (aged 58) Rimini, Italy

Gymnastics career
- Discipline: Men's artistic gymnastics
- Country represented: Italy
Medal record
Representing Kingdom of Italy
Olympic Games
Gold medal – first place	1932 Los Angeles	All-around
Gold medal – first place	1932 Los Angeles	Parallel bars
Gold medal – first place	1932 Los Angeles	Team combined exercises
Silver medal – second place	1928 Amsterdam	Horizontal bar
World Championships
Silver medal – second place	1934 Budapest	All-around
Bronze medal – third place	1934 Budapest	Vault

Romeo Neri (26 March 1903 – 23 September 1961) was an Italian gymnast. He won three gold medals at the 1932 Summer Olympics in Los Angeles, becoming, along with Helene Madison of the United States, the most successful athlete there. He previously won a silver medal at the 1928 Summer Olympics. In 1934, he won a silver medal and a bronze medal at the world championships in Budapest.

== Career ==
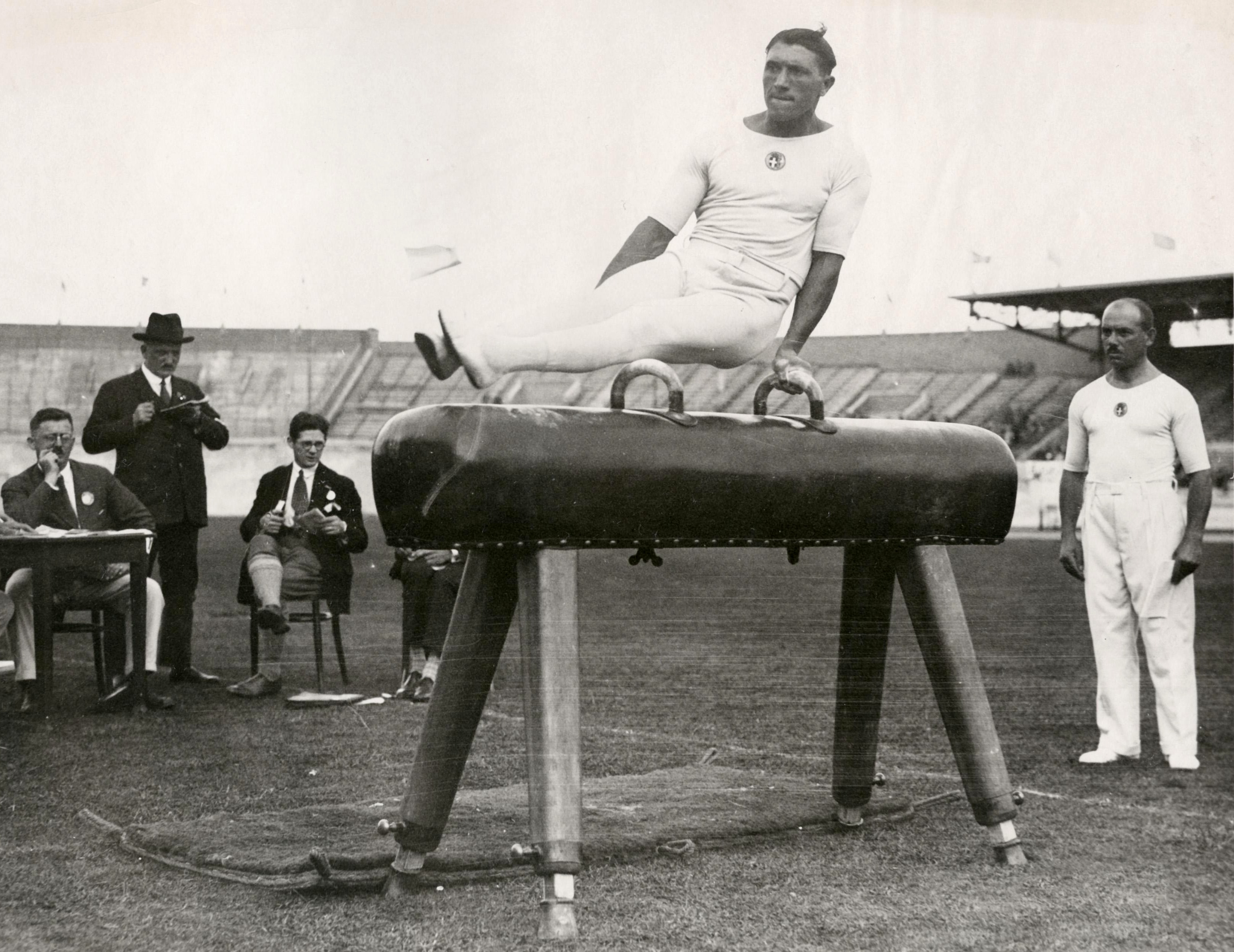
Romeo Neri at the 1928 Olympics

Neri took swimming, running, weightlifting and boxing before changing to gymnastics. In 1926, he won the national championships in the parallel bars, followed by four all-round titles in 1928–1930 and 1933. At the 1928 Olympics, besides winning a silver medal on the horizontal bar, he finished fourth on the rings and all-around. At the next games, he won the all-around competition with a 5.7-point gap from second place and greatly helped Italy to win the team gold. He also won gold on the parallel bars and finished fourth on the floor. At the 1936 Olympics, Neri competed with a torn arm muscle and did not complete his events. He retired from competitions at the onset of World War II, and after the war worked as a gymnastics coach, preparing the national team for the 1952 Olympics and training his sons Romano and Giambattista.

Neri was the first gold medalist from Rimini, and the football stadium there, Stadio Romeo Neri, bears his name.

== See also ==
- Walk of Fame of Italian sport
- List of multiple Olympic gold medalists
- Stadio Romeo Neri
