= Frank Cumiskey =

American gymnast (1912–2004)

- Full name: Frank Joseph Cumiskey
- Born: September 6, 1912 West New York, New Jersey, U.S.
- Died: July 22, 2004 (aged 91) Vero Beach, Florida, U.S.
- Spouse: Ada Lunardoni

Gymnastics career
- Discipline: Men's artistic gymnastics
- Country represented: United States
- Gym: Swiss Turnverein
Medal record
Men's artistic gymnastics
Representing United States
Event	1st	2nd	3rd
Olympic Games	0	1	0
Total	0	1	0
Olympic Games
Silver medal – second place	1932 Los Angeles	Team

Frank Joseph Cumiskey (September 6, 1912 – July 22, 2004) was an American gymnast. He was a member of the United States men's national artistic gymnastics team and competed in the 1932 Summer Olympics, in the 1936 Summer Olympics, and in the 1948 Summer Olympics.

== Early life ==
Born in West New York, New Jersey, Cumiskey was a resident of North Bergen, New Jersey. He attended Memorial High School.

== Gymnastics career ==
He was a member of Swiss Turnverein in Union City, New Jersey.

Cumiskey won over 25 United States national championships including 5 times for All-Around, 7 times for Side Horse, 7 times for Horizontal Bar, and at least 1 national championship each for the other four events. He was a member of three United States men's national artistic gymnastics teams for the Olympics from 1932 through 1948. His career was interrupted by World War II, which cancelled the 1940 and 1944 games. He won an Olympic silver medal in 1932 for the men's artistic team all-around.

== Later gymnastics involvement and legacy ==
Following his athletic career, Cumiskey remained involved in the sport. He served as a team manager for the 1952 USA Olympic men's gymnastics team in addition to serving as a judge at the event. He also judged at the World Artistic Gymnastics Championships and Pan American Games. He was the technical director for the United States Gymnastics Federation until 1977 and led the federation's publication of Who's Who Gymnastics in 1973.

Cumiskey was a founder of the National Gymnastics Judges Association. The organization inducted Cumiskey as the first inductee to their Hall of Fame in 1972 and named it in his honor.

He was one of the first ten inductees to the Helms Foundation Hall of Fame. in 1979, he founded the USA Gymnastics Junior Olympic Program, now called the Development Program, and USAG named the Frank J. Cumiskey Service Award in his honor to recognize individuals with contributions to that program. He was named by Sports Illustrated as one of the top 50 athletes from the state of New Jersey.

== Personal life ==
He was married for a time to fellow Olympic gymnast, Ada Lunardoni, with whom he had three children while living in Rockleigh, New Jersey. He worked for the United States Postal Service for 32 years and retired in 1977. He died in Vero Beach, Florida, at the age of 91 on July 21, 2004.
