= Michael Schuler =

American artistic gymnast

- Full name: Michael Schuler
- Born: November 8, 1901 Würzburg, German Empire
- Died: January 14, 1974 (aged 72) West New York, New Jersey, U.S.

Gymnastics career
- Discipline: Men's artistic gymnastics
- Country represented: United States
- Gym: Union Hill Turnverein
Medal record
Men's artistic gymnastics
Representing United States
Event	1st	2nd	3rd
Olympic Games	0	1	0
Total	0	1	0
Olympic Games
Silver medal – second place	1932 Los Angeles	Team

Michael Schuler (November 8, 1901 – January 14, 1974) was an American gymnast. He was a member of the United States men's national artistic gymnastics team and competed in the 1932 Summer Olympics. He was born in Würzburg and died in West New York.

As a gymnast, Schuler was a member of Union Hill Turnverein.
