= Al Jochim =

American artistic gymnast

- Full name: Alfred August Jochim
- Born: June 12, 1902 Berlin, German Empire
- Died: March 17, 1980 (aged 77) Teaneck, New Jersey, U.S.

Gymnastics career
- Discipline: Men's artistic gymnastics
- Country represented: United States
- Gym: Swiss Turnverein
Medal record
Men's artistic gymnastics
Representing United States
Event	1st	2nd	3rd
Olympic Games	0	2	0
Total	0	2	0
Olympic Games
Silver medal – second place	1932 Los Angeles	Team
Silver medal – second place	1932 Los Angeles	Vault

Alfred August Jochim (June 12, 1902 – March 17, 1980) was an American gymnast. He was born in Berlin, German Empire, and died in Teaneck, New Jersey. He was a member of the United States men's national artistic gymnastics team and won two silver medals in gymnastics at the 1932 Summer Olympics in Los Angeles.

As a gymnast, Jochim was a member of Swiss Turnverein in Union City, New Jersey. He won seven titles at the national level, the last one in 1933. He held the American record for most individual titles until Simone Biles won her eighth national title in 2023.

Jochim emigrated from Germany to the United States as a child and lived in New Jersey in Union City and Hackensack, before moving to Lodi a decade before his death.

Olympic Games
Preceded by Rolf Monsen	Flagbearer for United States; Berlin 1936	Succeeded by John Heaton
