= Mauri Nyberg-Noroma =

Finnish artistic gymnast

Mauri Noroma
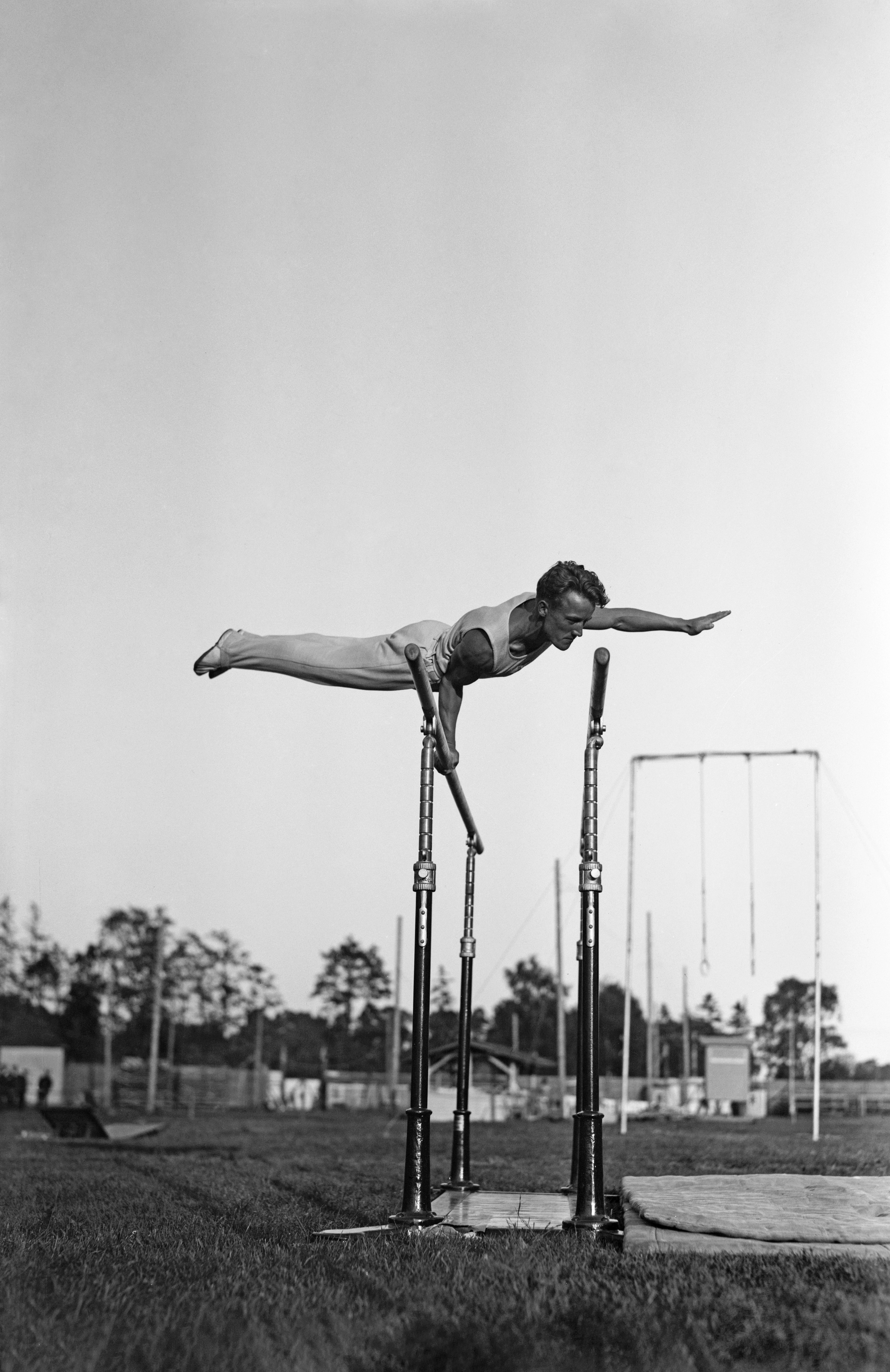
- Noroma in 1932

Personal information
- Full name: Mauri Kalervo Nyberg-Noroma
- Born: 31 January 1908 Viipuri, Grand Duchy of Finland, Russian Empire
- Died: 23 December 1939 (aged 31) Muolaa, Finland

Gymnastics career
- Discipline: Men's artistic gymnastics
- Country represented: Finland
Medal record
Men's artistic gymnastics
Representing Finland
Olympic Games
Bronze medal – third place	1932 Los Angeles	Team
Bronze medal – third place	1936 Berlin	Team

Mauri Kalervo Nyberg-Noroma (31 January 1908 in Viipuri – 23 December 1939 in Muolaa) was a Finnish gymnast.

He won three Olympic medals for Finland. He took part in his first Olympics in 1928 in Amsterdam but did not medal. He came joint sixth after a fifth place in the rings and seventh on the pommel horse and parallel bars. The Finnish team came in fifth place in the team competition.

In the next Olympics, in 1932, Finland took bronze in the team competition. Individually, Nyberg-Noroma failed to medal, but he came in fourth place in the parallel bars, 1.4 points behind his compatriot Heikki Savolainen, who took bronze. Overall, he came in ninth place.

At the Olympics in Berlin in 1936, the Finns repeated their result from the previous Olympics and won bronze in the team competition. This time, Nyberg-Noroma came in 16th place overall. He was killed in action during the Winter War.
