= Savino Guglielmetti =

Italian gymnast

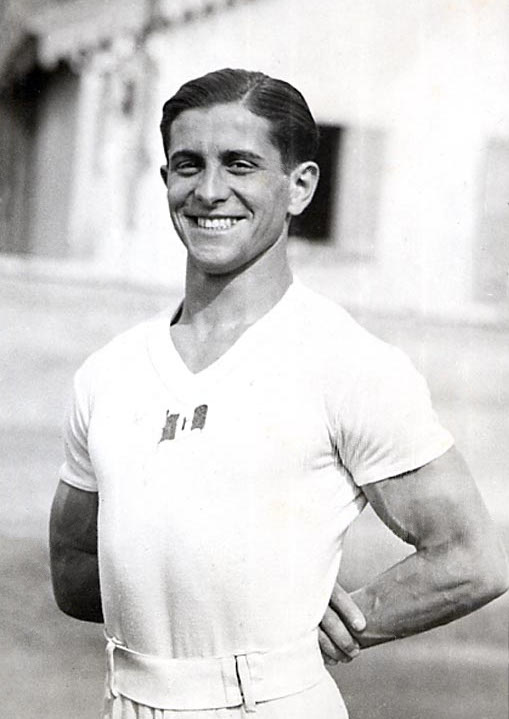
- Savino Guglielmetti in 1932

Personal information
- Born: 26 November 1911 Milan, Italy
- Died: 23 January 2006 (aged 94)

Gymnastics career
- Discipline: Men's artistic gymnastics
- Country represented: Italy
- Club: Società Ginnastica Pro Patria 1883
Medal record
Olympic Games
Gold medal – first place	1932 Los Angeles	Vault
Gold medal – first place	1932 Los Angeles	Team

Savino Guglielmetti (26 November 1911 – 23 January 2006) was an Italian gymnast. He competed at the 1932, 1936 and 1948 Olympics and won two gold medals in 1932.

== Biography ==
A taxi ran over Guglielmetti when he was a child, but he escaped unharmed. He later fell from a four-story building, but managed to cling on power cables and survived. Originally a pole vaulter, he joined a gymnastics club in 1927, where he was coached by Mario Corrias. Three years later he became a member of the national team. Although he won two Olympic gold medals in 1932, he faced a strong competition in Italy, and won his first national all-around title only in 1934. He defended it in 1935, 1937, 1938 and 1939.

In 1998 Guglielmetti was inducted into the International Gymnastics Hall of Fame, and in 2000 received the Olympic Order in Silver.
