= Martti Uosikkinen =

Finnish artistic gymnast (1909–1940)

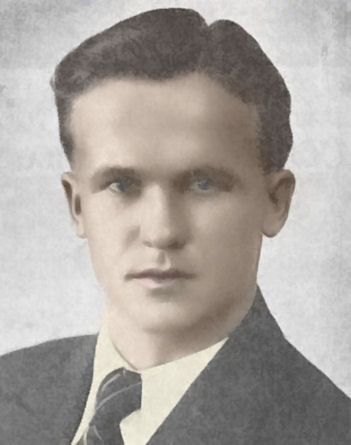

Personal information
- Born: 20 August 1909 Kuopio, Grand Duchy of Finland, Russian Empire
- Died: 9 March 1940 (aged 30) Loimola, Finland
- Height: 1.62 m (5 ft 4 in)

Gymnastics career
- Discipline: Men's artistic gymnastics
- Country represented: Finland
Medal record
Men's artistic gymnastics
Representing Finland
Olympic Games
Bronze medal – third place	1932 Los Angeles	Team
Bronze medal – third place	1936 Berlin	Team

Martti Uosikkinen (20 August 1909 – 9 March 1940) was a Finnish gymnast who competed in the 1928 Summer Olympics, in the 1932 Summer Olympics, and in the 1936 Summer Olympics. He was killed in action during World War II.

Uosikkinen was born in Kuopio. He died in the Battle of Kollaa, days before the end of the Winter War.
