= Péter Boros =

Hungarian gymnast

- Born: 12 January 1908 Budapest, Austria-Hungary
- Died: 16 October 1976 (aged 68) Budapest, Hungarian People's Republic

Gymnastics career
- Discipline: Men's artistic gymnastics
- Country represented: Hungary
- Club: Budapesti Budai Torna Egylet

Péter Boros (12 January 1908 – 16 October 1976) was a Hungarian gymnast. He competed in six events at the 1932 Summer Olympics, including two where he finished fifth, and the team all-around where he helped Hungary to a fourth-place finish.
