= Miklós Péter =

Hungarian gymnast

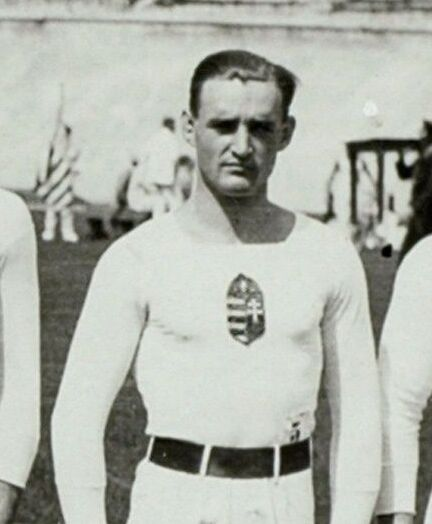
- Miklós Péter in 1928

Personal information
- Born: 27 April 1906 Budapest, Austria-Hungary
- Died: 18 July 1978 (aged 72) Budapest, Hungary

Gymnastics career
- Discipline: Men's artistic gymnastics
- Country represented: Hungary
- Club: BTC, Budapest
Medal record
World Championships
Silver medal – second place	1930 Luxembourg	Horizontal bar

Miklós Péter (27 April 1906 – 18 July 1978) was a Hungarian gymnast, born in Budapest. He competed in gymnastics events at the 1928 Summer Olympics and the 1932 Summer Olympics. Additionally, he also competed at the 1930 World Artistic Gymnastics Championships where he won an individual silver medal on the horizontal bar apparatus.
