= Einari Teräsvirta =

Finnish gymnast and architect

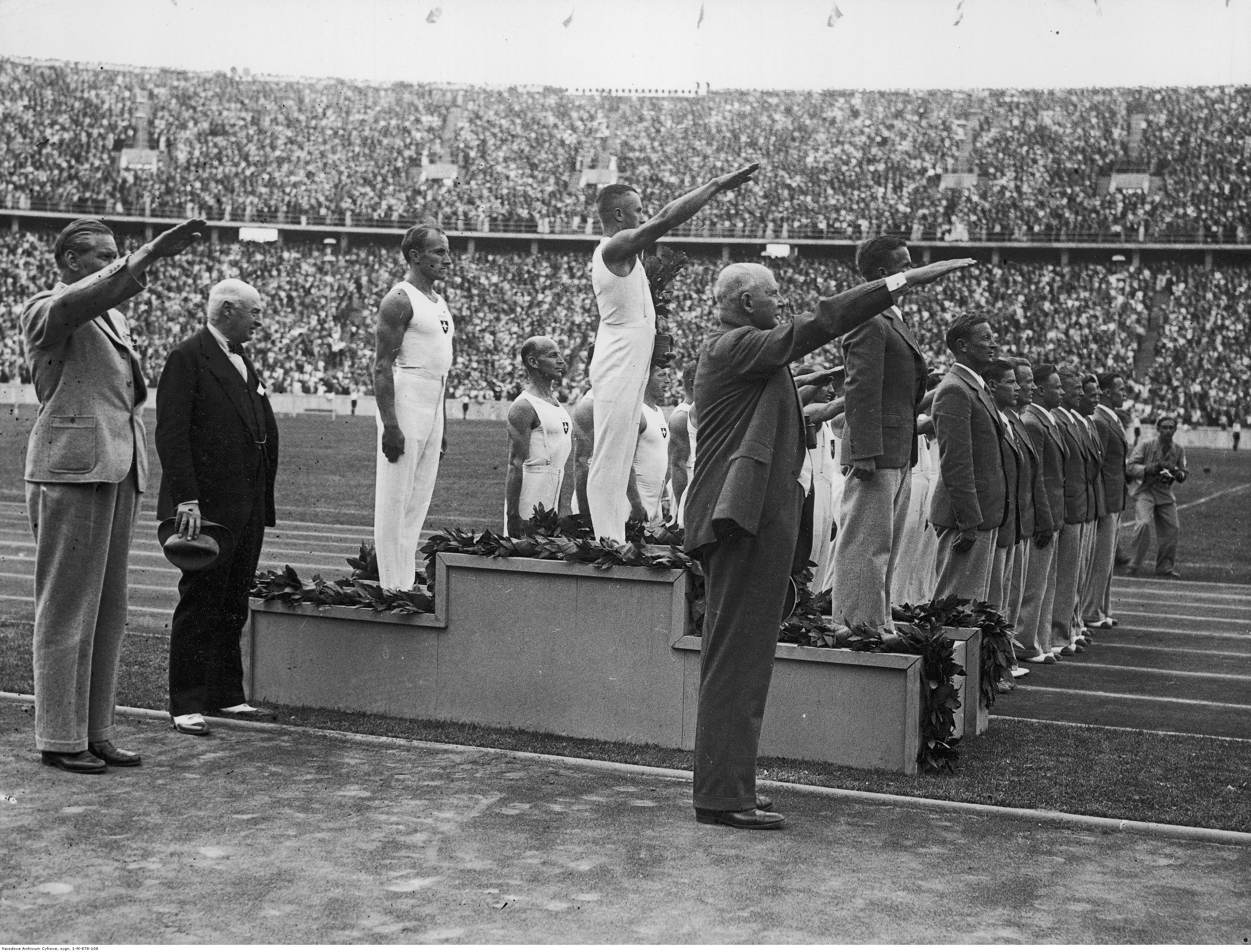
- Full name: Einari Allan Teräsvirta
- Born: 7 December 1914 Viipuri, Grand Duchy of Finland, Russian Empire
- Died: 23 November 1995 (aged 80) Helsinki, Finland

Gymnastics career
- Discipline: Men's artistic gymnastics
- Country represented: Finland
Medal record
Men's artistic gymnastics
Representing Finland
Olympic Games
| Gold medal – first place | 1948 London | Team |
| Bronze medal – third place | 1932 Los Angeles | Team |
| Bronze medal – third place | 1932 Los Angeles | Horizontal bar |
| Bronze medal – third place | 1936 Berlin | Team |

Einari Allan Teräsvirta (7 December 1914 – 23 November 1995) was a Finnish gymnast, Olympic Champion and well-known architect (graduated 1939, Helsinki).

== Gymnastics career ==
He competed at the 1932 Summer Olympics in Los Angeles, where he received a bronze medal in horizontal bar and a bronze medal in the team competition. At the 1948 Summer Olympics in London, he received a gold medal in team combined exercises.

== Post-gymnastics career ==
Notable designs by Teräsvirta include:

- Library of the Student Union of the University of Helsinki
- Finnish State Guesthouse
- Hotel Kalastajatorppa
- Hotel Marski

== Personal life ==
He is buried in the Hietaniemi Cemetery in Helsinki.
