= Ilmari Pakarinen =

Finnish artistic gymnast

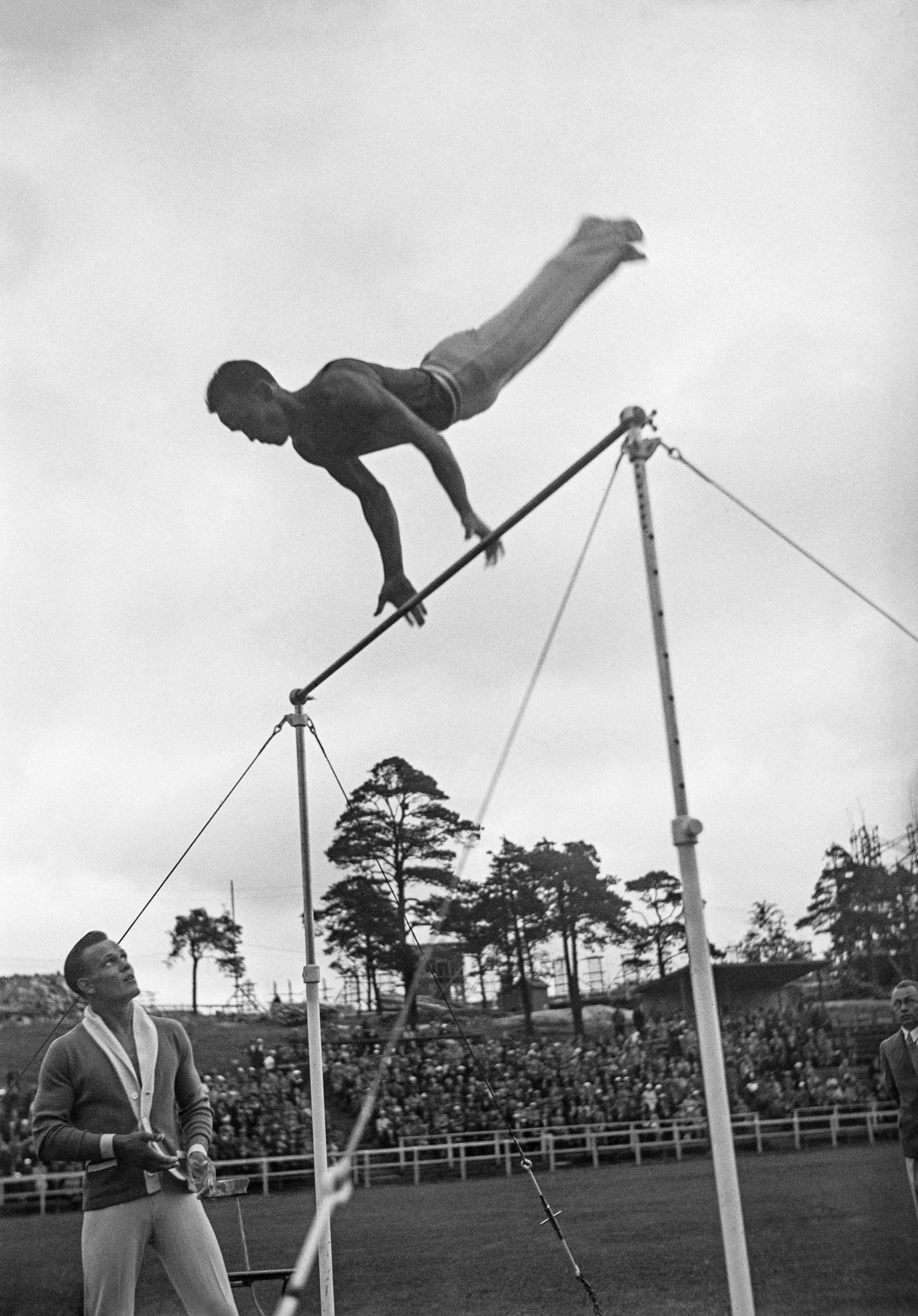
- Pakarinen on the horizontal bar in 1936.

Personal information
- Full name: Veikko Ilmari Pakarinen
- Born: 12 September 1910 Viipuri, Grand Duchy of Finland, Russian Empire
- Died: 6 December 1987 (aged 77) Gold Coast, Queensland, Australia

Gymnastics career
- Discipline: Men's artistic gymnastics
- Country represented: Finland
Medal record
Men's artistic gymnastics
Representing Finland
Olympic Games
Bronze medal – third place	1932 Los Angeles	Team
Bronze medal – third place	1936 Berlin	Team

Veikko Ilmari Pakarinen (12 September 1910 – 6 December 1987) was a Finnish gymnast who competed in the 1932 Summer Olympics and in the 1936 Summer Olympics.
