= István Pelle =

Hungarian gymnast (1907–1986)

- Born: 26 July 1907 Budapest, Hungary
- Died: 6 March 1986 (aged 78) Buenos Aires, Argentina

Gymnastics career
- Discipline: Men's artistic gymnastics
- Country represented: Hungary
- Club: BTC, Budapest
Medal record
Olympic Games
Gold medal – first place	1932 Los Angeles	Pommel horse
Gold medal – first place	1932 Los Angeles	Floor exercise
Silver medal – second place	1932 Los Angeles	Parallel bars
Silver medal – second place	1932 Los Angeles	All-around, individual
World Championships
Gold medal – first place	1930 Luxembourg	Horizontal bar
Gold medal – first place	1931 Paris	Parallel bars

István Pelle (26 July 1907 – 6 March 1986) was a Hungarian gymnast and Olympic champion.

He competed at the 1932 Summer Olympics in Los Angeles where he received gold medals in floor exercises and pommel horse, and silver medals in parallel bars and individual all-around. He also competed at the 1936 Berlin Summer Olympics, finishing 18th in the all-around competition. He was also quite successful at various World Championship competition during this time - at the 1930 Worlds, he won individual gold on the horizontal bar apparatus, and at the 1931 Worlds, he won individual gold on the parallel bars apparatus.

After World War II, he left Hungary, toured as an artist, and eventually settled in Argentina.
