= Heikki Savolainen =

Finnish gymnast

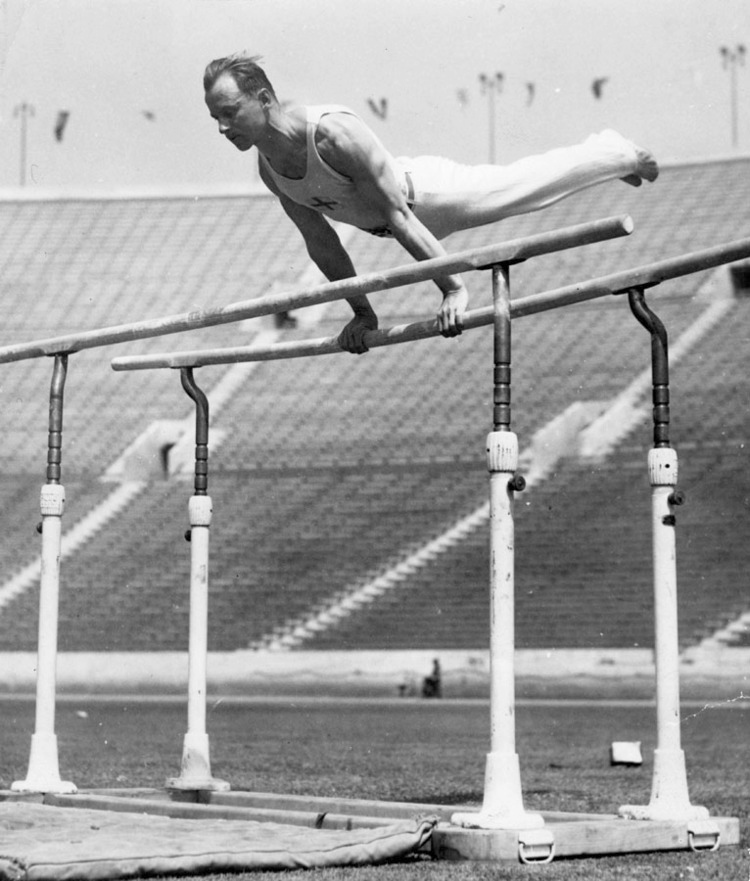
- Savolainen at the 1932 Olympics

Personal information
- Full name: Heikki Ilmari Savolainen
- Born: 28 September 1907 Joensuu, Grand Duchy of Finland, Russian Empire
- Died: 29 November 1997 (aged 90) Kajaani, Finland
- Height: 172 cm (5 ft 8 in)

Gymnastics career
- Discipline: Men's artistic gymnastics
- Country represented: Finland
Medal record
Men's artistic gymnastics
Representing Finland
Olympic Games
Gold medal – first place	1948 London	Pommel horse
Gold medal – first place	1948 London	Team all-around
Silver medal – second place	1932 Los Angeles	Horizontal bar
Bronze medal – third place	1928 Amsterdam	Pommel horse
Bronze medal – third place	1932 Los Angeles	Individual all-around
Bronze medal – third place	1932 Los Angeles	Parallel bars
Bronze medal – third place	1932 Los Angeles	Team all-around
Bronze medal – third place	1936 Berlin	Team all-around
Bronze medal – third place	1952 Helsinki	Team all-around
World Championships
Gold medal – first place	1931 Paris	Horizontal bar
Silver medal – second place	1950 Basel	Team all-around

Heikki Ilmari Savolainen (28 September 1907 – 29 November 1997) was a Finnish artistic gymnast. He competed in five consecutive Olympics from 1928 to 1952 and won at least one medal in each of them. In 1928, he won a bronze on pommel horse, which was the first-ever medal in gymnastics for Finland. Winning his last medal at the 1952 Summer Olympics in Helsinki, he became the oldest gymnastics medalist, at 44 years old; he delivered the Olympic Oath in the opening ceremony of the 1952 Games. In 1932, Savolainen and his teammate Einari Teräsvirta had the same score on horizontal bar, but the Finnish team voted to give the silver medal to Savolainen. In 1948, he again had the same score as teammates Veikko Huhtanen and Paavo Aaltonen on pommel horse, and the gold medal was shared among the three.

Additionally, he competed at the 1931 World Artistic Gymnastics Championships where, although he was the first-place finisher in the all-around combined exercises, he was not termed "world champion" because there was a special clause in the rules that, in order for any individual to be properly termed 'World Champion', they had to demonstrate a certain level of competency among all 14 events, scoring at least 60% of all of the points that could be possibly awarded on each event, which he did not do. Nevertheless, he did win an individual gold medal at those 1931 Worlds on the horizontal bar apparatus.

At the World Championships, Savolainen won only one medal: a team silver in 1950. Domestically, he collected 20 titles between 1928 and 1950, including six individual all-around titles in 1928–37.

Savolainen graduated as a physical education teacher in 1931 and a Doctor of Medicine in 1939, after which he started working as a doctor in his hometown Kajaani, Finland. During the Winter War, he served with the rank of lieutenant colonel as the head doctor in a military hospital. In parallel, Savolainen worked for the Finnish sports magazine Urheilulehti in 1932–37. From 1946 to 1959, he served as vice-president of the Finnish Gymnastics Federation, and in 1946–56 as president of the gymnastics federation of Kajaani, the town where he lived most of his later life.

Savolainen is the only Finnish gymnast inducted into the International Gymnastics Hall of Fame (2004).

== See also ==
- List of multiple Olympic medalists
