= Haga =

Haga is a surname and toponym common to Japan, Norway, Sweden and Swedish-speaking parts of Finland. Haga may refer to:

== People ==
- Akane Haga (2002), 12th generation member of Japanese pop group Morning Musume
- Anja Haga (born 1968), Dutch politician
- Arnfinn Haga (born 1936), Norwegian teacher and non-fiction writer
- Arild Haga (1913–1985), Norwegian revue writer
- Asahi Haga (芳賀 日陽; born 2000), Japanese footballer
- Åslaug Haga (born 1959), Norwegian politician who was leader of the Centre Party
- Bauke Jan Haga, Civil servant in the Netherlands Indies (governor of Borneao)
- Borghild Bondevik Haga (1906–1990), Norwegian politician for the Liberal Party
- Cornelius Haga (1578–1654), first ambassador of the Dutch Republic to the Ottoman Empire
- Edvard Haga (1893–1968), Finnish politician
- Hans Haga (1924–2008), Norwegian agrarian leader
- Hans Jensen Haga (1845–1924), Norwegian politician for the Conservative Party
- Herman Haga (1852–1936), Dutch physicist
- Katsuo Haga (芳賀 勝男; born 1938), Japanese boxer
- Mahito Haga (芳賀 真人; 1908–?), Japanese gymnast
- Misato Haga (芳賀 美里; born 1979), Japanese motorsport executive
- Marcelius Haga (1882–1968), Norwegian politician
- Noriyuki Haga (born 1975), Japanese Superbike World Championship rider
- Ragnhild Haga (born 1991), Norwegian cross-country skier
- Ryohei Haga (羽賀 亮平; born 1988), Japanese speed skater
- Ryunosuke Haga (born 1991), Japanese judoka
- Yōsuke Haga (芳賀 陽介; born 1986), Japanese ice hockey player

=== Fictional ===
- Insector Haga, character from Yu-Gi-Oh! Duel Monsters (Weevil Underwood in English language adaptations)

== Places ==
=== Finland ===
- Haaga (Swedish: Haga), a district in Helsinki
- Hagalund (Finnish: Tapiola), a district in Espoo

=== Japan ===
- Haga, Hyōgo, a former town in Hyōgo Prefecture
- Haga, Tochigi, a town in Tochigi Prefecture
- Haga District, Tochigi, a district in Tochigi Prefecture

=== Norway ===
- Haga, Nes, a village in Nes municipality in Akershus county
- Haga Station, a railway station located in the village of Haga in Nes municipality
- Haga, Vestland, a village in Samnanger municipality in Vestland county
- Haga Church (Norway), a church in the village of Haga in Samnanger municipality

=== Sweden ===
- Håga, locality situated in Uppsala Municipality, Uppsala County, Sweden
- Haga, Gothenburg, a district in Gothenburg
- Haga, Umeå, a residential area in Umeå
- Haga Castle, Swedish castle outside Enköping by Lake Mälaren
- Haga Church, a church located in Gothenburg, Sweden
- Haga Echo Temple, situated in Hagaparken in Stockholm
- Haga, Enköping, locality situated in Enköping Municipality, Uppsala County, Sweden,
- Haga Palace, located in Hagaparken, Solna Municipality in Sweden
- Haga trädgård, located in the northern end of Hagaparken Solna, Sweden
- Hagaparken (Haga Park), in Solna Municipality just north of Stockholm

== Other ==
- The battle cry of Sapporo cannoneers.
- Hebrew term for yum-yum.
- SS Haga, a number of steamships
