= Hag (disambiguation) =

A hag is a wizened old woman, or a fairy with the appearance of an old woman.

Hag may also refer to:

- HAG, a Swiss model train company
- Håg, in Scandinavian mythology
- Hag (album), a 1971 album by Merle Haggard
- Hag (Dungeons & Dragons), a class of fictional role playing monster
- Hag and Mag, a pair of demons in Mandaeism
- Hag and Troll, demonic super villains in the Marvel Comics Universe
- 'Hag.' may be an abbreviation for:
  - Book of Haggai, a book of the Hebrew Bible
  - Hagigah, rabbinic text
- Café HAG, a brand of decaffeinated coffee
- Hagley railway station, in England
- Hag moth (Phobetron pithecium), a moth of the family
- Hanga language, spoken in Ghana
- High Assurance Guard, computer security device
- Kari Hag (born 1941), Norwegian mathematician
- Peat hag, erosion
- Hags (restaurant), a restaurant in New York City

== See also ==
- Hagg (disambiguation)
- Haga (disambiguation)
- Haig (disambiguation)
- Chag (disambiguation)
- Night hag (disambiguation)
- Fag hag, a woman who associates mainly with gay men
