= 1845 in Norway =

- Centuries: 17th; 18th; 19th; 20th; 21st
- Decades: 1820s; 1830s; 1840s; 1850s; 1860s
- See also: 1845 in Sweden; List of years in Norway

Events in the year 1845 in Norway.

== Incumbents ==
- Monarch: Oscar I .
- First Minister: Nicolai Krog

== Events ==
- Skutterudite, a mineral containing nickel and iron, was discovered. The discovery was made in Skuterud Mines, Modum, Buskerud.
- The twelfth Storting convened, following the 1844 election.
- 16 July - The Dissenter Act was enacted.
- The town of Namsos is founded.
- The town of Sandefjord is founded.
- The town of Svelvik is founded.
- The town of Brevik is founded.

== Notable births ==
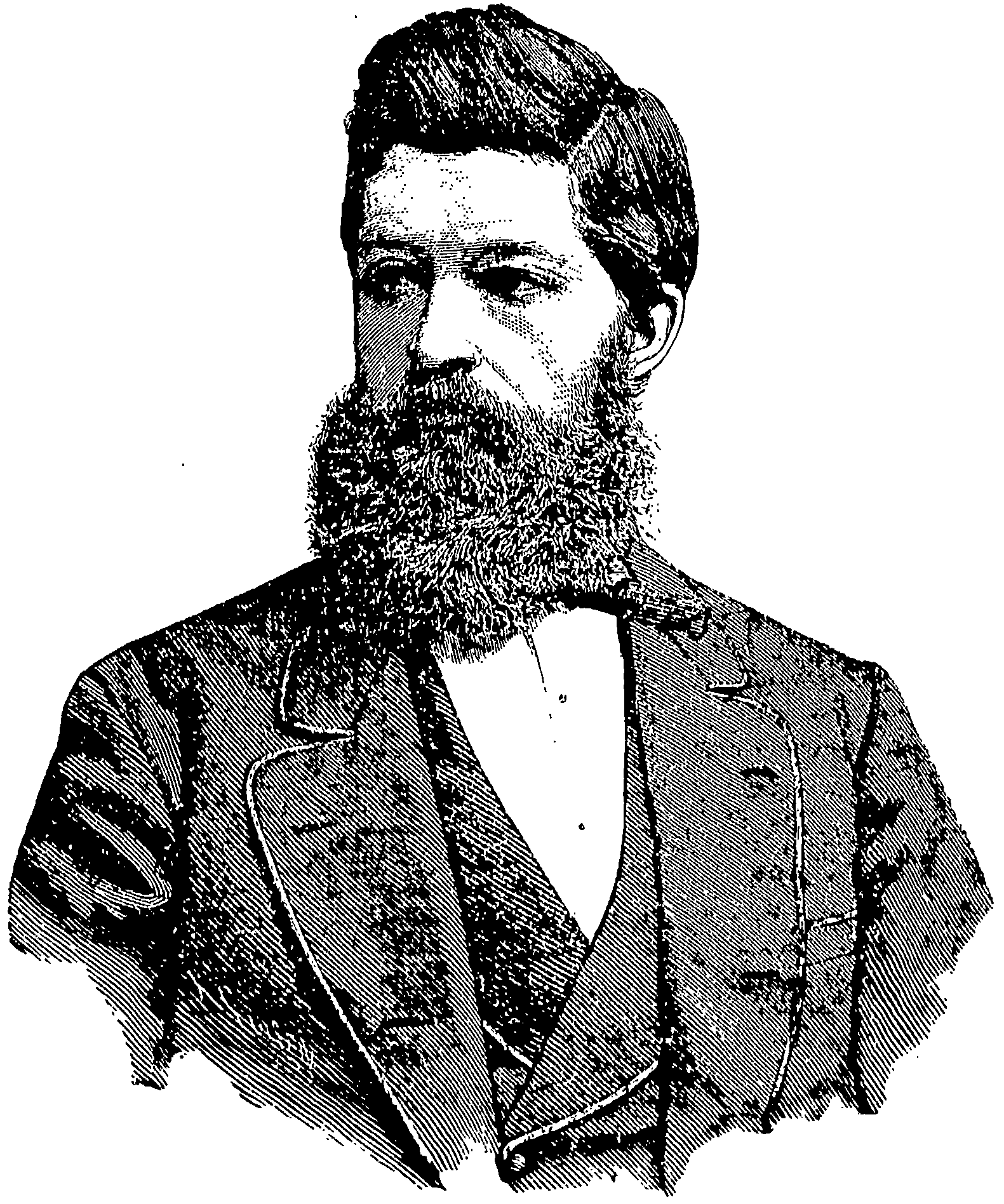
Jakob Sverdrup

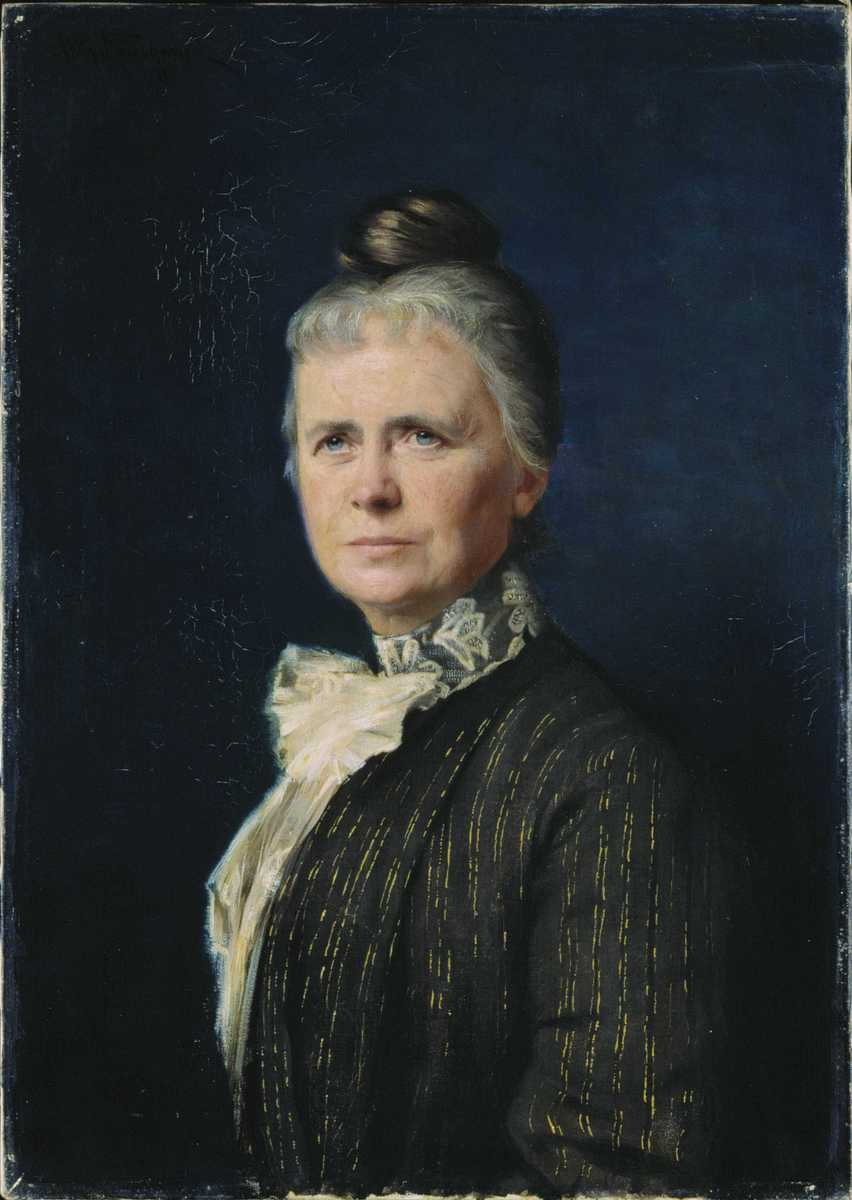
Ragna Nielsen

- 10 January – Jørund Telnes, farmer, teacher, writer and politician (d. 1892).
- 17 January – Erika Nissen, pianist (d. 1903)
- 7 March – Jens Braage Halvorsen, librarian, magazine editor and literary historian (d. 1900).
- 27 March – Jakob Sverdrup, bishop and politician (d. 1899).
- 18 June – Gustav Storm, historian (d. 1903).
- 15 July – Christian Holtermann Knudsen, typographer, newspaper editor, publisher, trade unionist and politician (d. 1929)
- 17 July – Ragna Vilhelmine Nielsen, pedagogue and feminist (d. 1924)
- 6 August – Edvard Liljedahl, politician and Minister (d. 1924)
- 5 September – Hans Hein Theodor Nysom, politician (d. 1903)
- 9 September – Christen Christensen, shipyard owner, ship-owner and whaling manager (d. 1923)
- 28 September – Cæsar Peter Møller Boeck, dermatologist (d. 1917)
- 10 October – Anton Jörgen Andersen, composer (d. 1926)
- 7 December – Tinius Olsen, Norwegian American engineer and inventor (d. 1932)

=== Full date unknown ===
- Sofus Arctander, politician and Minister (d. 1924)
- Peter Olaf Debes, politician
- Hans Jensen Haga, politician
- Ludwig Andreas Olsen, United States Navy sailor awarded two Medals of Honor (d. 1886)
- Ole Andres Olsen, Seventh-day Adventist minister and administrator (d. 1915)
- Oscar Ludvig Stoud Platou, jurist and professor (d. 1929)
- Jon Eilevsson Steintjønndalen, Hardanger fiddle maker (d. 1902)

== Notable deaths ==
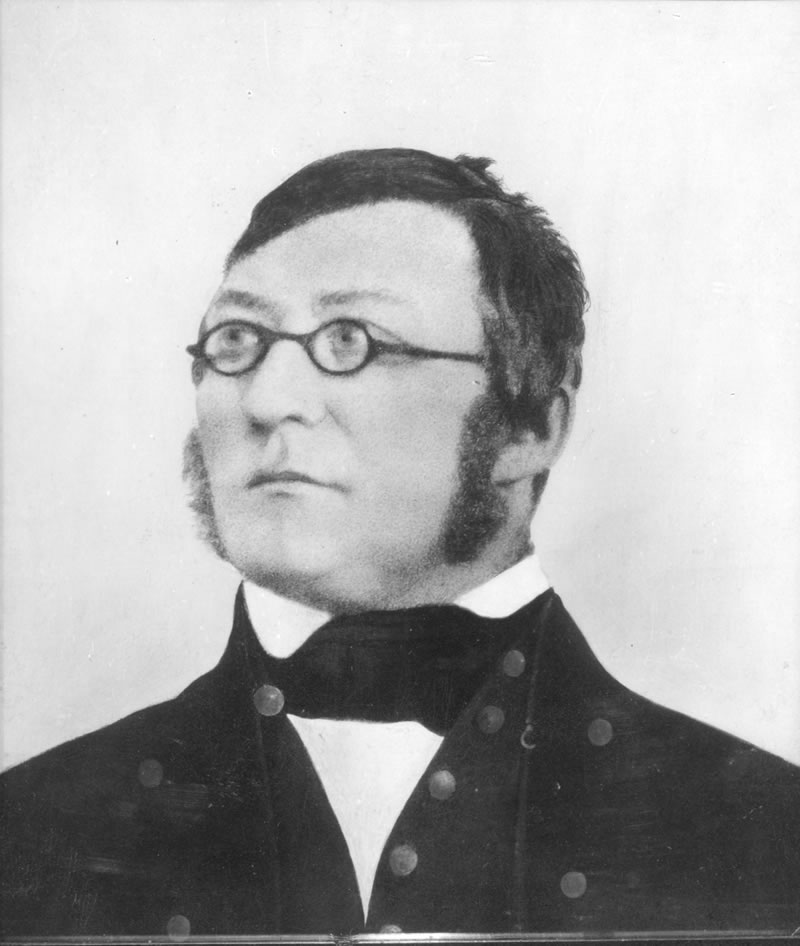
Henrik Wergeland

- 13 February – Henrik Steffens, philosopher, scientist, and poet (b. 1773)
- 29 March – Ingebrigt Belle, peasant agitator (b. 1773)
- 17 May – Christopher Borgersen Hoen, farmer and politician (b. 1767).
- 12 July – Henrik Wergeland, poet (b. 1808)
- 22 October – Fredrik Riis, civil servant (b. 1789)
- 31 October – Johan Reinhardt, professor in zoology (b. 1778)

=== Full date unknown ===
- Erich Haagensen Jaabech, farmer and politician (b. 1761)
- Christian Sørenssen, bishop and politician
