= Haggo =

Haggo is a surname. Notable people with the surname include:

- Allan Haggo (born 1961), Scottish cricket umpire
- David Haggo (born 1964), Scottish cricketer
- Kayleigh Haggo (born 1999), Scottish boccia player, frame runner, and para swimmer
- Samantha Haggo (born 1992), Scottish cricketer

== See also ==
- Hägg
