= Stein Erik Ulvund =

Norwegian educationalist

Stein Erik Ulvund (born 11 August 1952) is a Norwegian educationalist.

He was born in Nes i Hallingdal. He took his dr.philos. in 1986 and became professor at the University of Oslo in 1994. He is also assisting professor at the University of Tromsø.

His most notable works include Cognitive Development in Infancy (1989), Spedbarnsalderen (1991, with L. Smith), Lettvektere: om for tidlig fødte barn (1992) and Forstå barnet ditt (three volumes, 2002-2007).
