= Hagg =

Hagg or Haggs may refer to:

== Hagg ==
- Hägg, Swedish surname
- Hagg (surname)
- Fox Hagg, a nature reserve in Sheffield
- Levitt Hagg, largely abandoned hamlet in South Yorkshire, England
- Henry Hagg Lake, artificial lake in northwest Oregon, United States
- Ḥaǧǧ: Hajj, annual Muslim pilgrimage to Mecca

== Haggs ==
- Haggs, village in Falkirk, Scotland
- Haggs Castle, 16th-century tower house, Pollokshields, Glasgow, Scotland
- Sea Haggs, 1990s Australian indie rock band

== See also ==
- Hag (disambiguation)
