= Dallas Bixler =

American gymnast (1910–1990)

- Full name: Dallas Denver Bixler
- Born: February 17, 1910 Hutchinson, Kansas, U.S.
- Died: August 13, 1990 (aged 80) Buena Park, California, U.S.

Gymnastics career
- Discipline: Men's artistic gymnastics
- Country represented: United States
- Club: Los Angeles Athletic Club; Germania Turnverein; Los Angeles High School
- Retired: 1935
Medal record
Men's artistic gymnastics
Representing United States
Event	1st	2nd	3rd
Olympic Games	1	0	0
Total	1	0	0
Olympic Games
Gold medal – first place	1932 Los Angeles	Horizontal bar

Dallas Denver Bixler (February 17, 1910 – August 13, 1990) was an American gymnast and Olympic champion. He was a member of the United States men's national artistic gymnastics team and competed at the 1932 Summer Olympics in Los Angeles where he received a gold medal in the horizontal bar.

== Early life ==
Bixler was born on February 17, 1910, in Hutchinson, Kansas. He moved to Los Angeles, California in 1920. He attended Los Angeles High School from 1925 to 1929. While a student, he competed in gymnastics as his father didn't want him to play football.

== Gymnastics career ==
As a gymnast after high school, Bixler was a member of Germania Turnverein until 1927. He then switched to the Los Angeles Athletic Club and competed with the organization until 1935.

Bixler participated in the 1932 Summer Olympics in Los Angeles. He qualified as a specialist just 5 days before the Games' opening. He competed in one event, the Horizontal Bar. Sitting in third place after the first rotation, Bixler used a "reverse giant" he learned from Glenn Berry in 1928 during his second rotation to win the gold medal.

He later competed at the Century of Progress, the 1933 Chicago World's Fair. A shoulder injury sustained in May 1935 led Bixler to an early retirement from the sport.

== Later life ==
Following his athletic career, Bixler had a hand in judging and coaching. Bixler judged the sport for 44 years, stopping in 1975. He also helped coach Cathy Rigby, star of the 1968 USA women's gymnastics team.

He met his wife, Virginia, in 1942 and the pair married shortly thereafter. They had three children.

Bixler joined the Merchant Marines in 1942 and remained with them until the conclusion of World War II. After the war, Bixler owned and operated a restaurant for 10 years and then was a food supervisor for Disneyland. He later attended the University of California, Los Angeles where he earned teaching credentials, which he used to teach commercial cooking within the Los Angeles City School District before retiring in 1975.

In 1960, Bixler was inducted as part of the 2nd class to the USA Gymnastics Hall of Fame. He was president of the SoCal Olympians in 1971-1972. He was a member of the LAOOC's Spirit Team for the 1984 Olympic Games.

Bixler died at the age of 80 in Buena Park, California.
