= Odd Bakkerud =

Norwegian fiddle player

Odd Bakkerud (June 11, 1931 – October 13, 1989) was a Norwegian fiddle player.

== Biography ==
Bakkerud was from the parish of Nes in Buskerud, Norway. He was raised near the town of Nesbyen in the rural Halling Valley. Bakkerud first learned to play from the fiddler Jørgen Husemoen (1905–1976) from Nes and Kristian Øvrevollseie (1910–1973) from Hol, and he soon became a noted dance fiddler. He also took lessons from Truls Ørpen (1880–1958) from Krødsherad, improving his playing style over time, distinguishing himself as an outstanding concert fiddler, where he was on par with Kjetil Løndal (1907–1987) and Torleiv Bolstad (1915–1979). In the 1950s, he played together with them in the Folk Music Association (Norwegian: Laget for folkemusikk) in Oslo.

Bakkerud was at his artistic peak in the 1960s, and he won the national fiddling competition (Norwegian: Landskappleiken) in 1968 with the bravura piece Fanitullen (The Devil's Tune). Since then, his interpretation of the tune has been the most widely used. His interpretation of the tune was recorded by the band Christiania Fusel & Blaagress headed by Øystein Sunde, and for many years the recording was the theme for the NRK radio program Norsktoppen.

Fiddling competitions inspired Bakkerud to play at his best. He always prepared carefully for them, displaying personal and instrumental enthusiasm. His fiddling had a sonorous, pure, and strong tone, and he played clearly, precisely, and elegantly with a buoyant and catchy rhythm. He took care that his performance would be appealing for dancing. Bakkerud helped train younger fiddle players; the foremost being Øyvind Brabant from Nes. He was named a Norwegian government scholar in 1980.
