= Direxiv =

Japanese motorsports company

(Japan) Direxiv Co. Ltd.
- Founded: 2004
- Folded: 2007
- Base: Minato, Tokyo, Japan
- Team principal(s): Misato Haga
- Former series: Super GT; Formula Nippon
- Noted drivers: (Japan) Shogo Mitsuyama (Japan) Yasuo Miyagawa (Japan) Nobuteru Taniguchi

Direxiv Co. Ltd. was a motorsports company that competed in Super GT and Formula Nippon. The company had links to the GP2 Series, then the feeder series for Formula One, and had submitted an entry to run a Formula One team in 2008.

== History ==
Direxiv Motorsports
- Base: Minato, Tokyo, Japan
- Noted staff: Jean Alesi; Alexander Wurz; Misato Haga

Formula One World Championship career
- Races entered: 0
- Constructors' Championships: 0
- Drivers' Championships: 0
- Race victories: 0
- Podiums: 0
- Points: 0
- Pole positions: 0
- Fastest laps: 0

Direxiv Co. Ltd. was started in July 2004. The company operated a motorsport team, Direxiv Motorsports, that competed in Super GT and Formula Nippon, the top echelons of Japanese motorsport, with no results in lower categories. Direxiv also acted as a title sponsor for David Price Racing in the GP2 and GP3 Series. The company appointed former race queen Misato Haga as the manager for their race team, giving them increased attention within the Japanese racing scene.

Direxiv Motorsports's first season of competition was in 2005, fielding a Vemac RD320R in the GT300 class of Super GT in a technical partnership with R&D Sport, with Shogo Mitsuyama and Yasuo Miyagawa as drivers. The company also began sponsoring drivers in several teams in the GP2 Series, namely Olivier Pla, Clivio Piccione and Hiroki Yoshimoto. With increased attention internationally, Direxiv launched into a partnership with David Price Racing in 2006 to become DPR Direxiv, hiring former Formula One driver Jean Alesi as executive director and McLaren test driver Alexander Wurz as director of the team's young driver program. Direxiv also continued their involvement in Super GT, this time with Nobuteru Taniguchi replacing Miyagawa, sponsored Mitsuyama in Formula Nippon and Lewis Hamilton in GP2 among other drivers.

Direxiv's intent to enter Formula One was announced at an event at Suzuka Circuit; Alesi announced the team's plans to enter Formula One as part of a technical tie-up with McLaren, essentially acting as their B-team, while using McLaren's old factories. It was speculated that Direxiv would be provided an engine from Mercedes High Performance Powertrains and a McLaren-designed chassis; the team would have likely given Hamilton and either Pedro de la Rosa or Gary Paffett a Formula One seat, with Alesi as team principal and Haga in some sort of advisory role. Direxiv and DPR would apply for a grid slot in 2008 in March 2006, facing other prospective entries such as Carlin, Eddie Jordan, Paul Stoddart and Racing Engineering; in April 2006, the FIA announced that the final grid slot had been given to Prodrive F1. A specific reason for Direxiv's rejection was never given.

In August 2006, Direxiv announced their withdrawal from all forms of motorsport with the exception of Super GT; it was also revealed that Direxiv's parent company was Akiyama Holdings, an investment company who had ties to the Super Aguri F1 Team. A few days later, Direxiv announced their withdrawal from Super GT due to loss of funding from Akiyama Holdings, despite the team leading the championship at the time; the Suzuka 1000km was their last race in the series. The team would be taken over wholly by R&D Sport, with Toshio Suzuki appointed as team manager for that car, while EMS Management took over management of the team in Formula Nippon. Mitsuyama and Taniguchi saw out the season with R&D Sport, finishing 3rd in the championship.

Direxiv was dissolved in April 2007. Prodrive would withdraw their entry into Formula One in 2008 citing legal situations leading the team to have little time to set up before the start of the season. Hamilton would enter Formula One in 2007 with a seat at McLaren and win the Formula One World Championship in 2008, de la Rosa remained a McLaren test driver and returned to Formula One in 2010 with Sauber while Paffett was released from his test driver contract in October 2006 before being re-signed; although he was linked to the Prodrive outfit the team's withdrawal ended any speculation of a drive and there were no further realistic opportunities for him to re-enter Formula One. Haga moved to Avanzza Bomex to act as team manager in 2007 and moved to MOLA in 2008 for their successful championship campaign. She would then focus on her other business ventures before returning to team management in 2021 with Yogibo Drago Corse.

== GP2 sponsorships ==
Direxiv had their logo on several cars in the 2005-2006 GP2 field, including:

- DPR Direxiv (Direxiv title sponsors)
- ART Grand Prix
- BCN Competicion
- Durango

== British Formula 3 partnerships ==
Direxiv partnered competitors for the 2008 F1 grid spot, Carlin Motorsport, in the British F3 International Series and is the title sponsor for German driver Maro Engel.

== Complete Super GT results ==
(key) (Races in bold indicate pole position) (Races in italics indicate fastest lap)

Year	Car	Tyres	Class	No.	Drivers	1	2	3	4	5	6	7	8	9	Pos	Points
2005	Vemac RD320R	**Y**	GT300	27	(Japan) Shogo Mitsuyama (Japan) Yasuo Miyagawa (Japan) Hiroki Yoshimoto	OKA; 9	FUJ; 11	SEP; Ret	SUG; 6	MOT; 18	FUJ; 10	AUT; 10	SUZ; 14		10th	13
2006	Vemac RD320R	**Y**	GT300	27	(Japan) Shogo Mitsuyama (Japan) Nobuteru Taniguchi	SUZ; 7	OKA; 1	FUJ; 18	SEP; 2	SUG; 4	SUZ; 2	MOT	AUT	FUJ	**2nd**	**67**
