= 2022 GT World Challenge Asia =

Car racing season

The 2022 Fanatec GT World Challenge Asia Powered by AWS was the fourth season of the GT World Challenge Asia, an auto racing series for grand tourer cars in Asia co-promoted by the SRO Motorsports Group and Team Asia One GT Management. The races were contested with GT3-spec and GT4-spec cars. The season began on 20 May at Sepang in Malaysia and was scheduled to end on 23 October at the new Mandalika Circuit in Indonesia, however the round was cancelled due to homologation issues, therefore the championship finished at the Okayama International Circuit in Japan. It was the second season of the unification of GT3 sprint series across the globe under the World Challenge name and the first since Blancpain ended its title sponsorship of the series.

== Calendar ==
Round	Race name	Circuit	Date
1	(Malaysia) AWS Malaysian GT Series	Sepang International Circuit, Sepang District, Selangor	20–22 May
2	MOTUL Japan Cup Series of Suzuka	Suzuka International Racing Course, Suzuka, Mie	15–17 July
3	Pirelli Japan Cup Series of Fuji	Fuji Speedway, Oyama, Shizuoka	22–24 July
4	Fanatec Japan Cup Series of SUGO	Sportsland SUGO, Murata, Miyagi	19–21 August
5	Honda Japan Cup Series of Okayama	Okayama International Circuit, Mimasaka, Okayama	23–25 September
Cancelled Rounds
-	(Indonesia) Pirelli Indonesian GT Series	Mandalika International Street Circuit, Central Lombok, West Nusa Tenggara	21–23 October

Also part of the Japan Cup Series
- The Pirelli Indonesian GT Series originally scheduled 21–23 October, but was cancelled due to track homologation issues.

== Entry list ==
Team	Car	Engine	No.	Drivers	Class	Rounds
GT3
(Japan) Team Uematsu	McLaren 720S GT3	McLaren M840T 4.0L Turbo V8	2	(Japan) Yudai Uchida	Am	2–5
(Japan) Team Uematsu	McLaren 720S GT3	McLaren M840T 4.0L Turbo V8	2	(Japan) Tadao Uematsu	Am	2–5
(Japan) PLUS with BMW Team Studie	BMW M4 GT3	BMW S58B30T0 3.0 L Turbo V8	5	(Japan) Seiji Ara	PA	2–5
(Japan) PLUS with BMW Team Studie	BMW M4 GT3	BMW S58B30T0 3.0 L Turbo V8	5	(Japan) Tomohide Yamaguchi	PA	2–5
(Japan) Comet Racing	Honda NSX GT3 Evo22	Honda JNC1 3.5 L Turbo V6	7	(Japan) Yorikatsu Tsujiko	Am	2–5
(Japan) Comet Racing	Honda NSX GT3 Evo22	Honda JNC1 3.5 L Turbo V6	7	(Japan) Yusuke Yamasaki	Am	2–5
(New Zealand) EBM Giga Racing	Porsche 911 GT3 R	Porsche 4.0 L Flat-6	8	(New Zealand) Reid Harker	PA	All
(New Zealand) EBM Giga Racing	Porsche 911 GT3 R	Porsche 4.0 L Flat-6	8	(Indonesia) Setiawan Santoso	PA	All
(New Zealand) EBM Giga Racing	Porsche 911 GT3 R	Porsche 4.0 L Flat-6	11	(New Zealand) Earl Bamber	PA	1
(New Zealand) EBM Giga Racing	Porsche 911 GT3 R	Porsche 4.0 L Flat-6	11	(Malaysia) Adrian D’Silva	PA	1
(New Zealand) EBM Giga Racing	Porsche 911 GT3 R	Porsche 4.0 L Flat-6	18	(Thailand) Kantadhee Kusiri	S	2
(New Zealand) EBM Giga Racing	Porsche 911 GT3 R	Porsche 4.0 L Flat-6	18	(Thailand) Tanart Sathienthirakul	S	2
(New Zealand) AAS Motorsport	Porsche 911 GT3 R	Porsche 4.0 L Flat-6	18	(Thailand) Kantadhee Kusiri	S	3–5
(New Zealand) AAS Motorsport	Porsche 911 GT3 R	Porsche 4.0 L Flat-6	18	(Thailand) Tanart Sathienthirakul	S	3–5
(Japan) ABSSA Motorsport	McLaren 720S GT3	McLaren M840T 4.0L Turbo V8	16	(Japan) Hiroshi Koizumi	PA	2–5
(Japan) ABSSA Motorsport	McLaren 720S GT3	McLaren M840T 4.0L Turbo V8	16	(Japan) Keita Sawa	PA	2–5
(Japan) B-Max Engineering	Lamborghini Huracán GT3 Evo	Lamborghini DGF 5.2 L V10	19	(Japan) Hiroshi Hamaguchi	Am	2
(Japan) B-Max Engineering	Lamborghini Huracán GT3 Evo	Lamborghini DGF 5.2 L V10	19	(Japan) Mineki Okura	Am	2
(Japan) Reap Fueling Ambitions	Lamborghini Huracán GT3 Evo	Lamborghini DGF 5.2 L V10	19	(Japan) Hiroshi Hamaguchi	Am	3–5
(Japan) Reap Fueling Ambitions	Lamborghini Huracán GT3 Evo	Lamborghini DGF 5.2 L V10	19	(Japan) Mineki Okura	Am	3–5
(Japan) Audi Team Hitotsuyama	Audi R8 LMS Evo II	Audi DAR 5.2 L V10	21	(Japan) Motohiro Ogura	Am	4
(Japan) Audi Team Hitotsuyama	Audi R8 LMS Evo II	Audi DAR 5.2 L V10	21	(Japan) Akihiro Tsuzuki	Am	4
(Hong Kong) Audi Sport Asia Team X Works	Audi R8 LMS Evo II	Audi DAR 5.2 L V10	22	(Thailand) Sandy Stuvik	PA	1–2
(Hong Kong) Audi Sport Asia Team X Works	Audi R8 LMS Evo II	Audi DAR 5.2 L V10	22	(Australia) Yasser Shahin	PA	1
(Hong Kong) Audi Sport Asia Team X Works	Audi R8 LMS Evo II	Audi DAR 5.2 L V10	22	(China) David Pun	PA	2–3
(Hong Kong) Audi Sport Asia Team X Works	Audi R8 LMS Evo II	Audi DAR 5.2 L V10	22	(Hong Kong) Marchy Lee	PA	2
(Hong Kong) Audi Sport Asia Team X Works	Audi R8 LMS Evo II	Audi DAR 5.2 L V10	22	(Hong Kong) Shaun Thong	PA	3
(Hong Kong) Elf Bar Racing Team X Works	Audi R8 LMS Evo II	Audi DAR 5.2 L V10	91	(China) David Pun	PA	1–2
(Hong Kong) Elf Bar Racing Team X Works	Audi R8 LMS Evo II	Audi DAR 5.2 L V10	91	(Hong Kong) Shaun Thong	PA	1–2
(Hong Kong) X Works	Audi R8 LMS Evo II	Audi DAR 5.2 L V10	91	(China) David Pun	PA	4
(Hong Kong) X Works	Audi R8 LMS Evo II	Audi DAR 5.2 L V10	91	(Hong Kong) Shaun Thong	PA	4
(Japan) Yogibo Racing	Ferrari 488 GT3 Evo 2020	Ferrari F154CB 3.9 L Turbo V8	27	(Japan) Naoki Yokomizo	S	All
(Japan) Yogibo Racing	Ferrari 488 GT3 Evo 2020	Ferrari F154CB 3.9 L Turbo V8	27	(Japan) Shogo Mitsuyama	S	1
(Japan) Yogibo Racing	Ferrari 488 GT3 Evo 2020	Ferrari F154CB 3.9 L Turbo V8	27	(Japan) Kiyoto Fujinami	S	2–5
(Japan) Porsche Center Okazaki	Porsche 911 GT3 R	Porsche 4.0 L Flat-6	30	(Japan) Yuta Kamimura	PA	2–3, 5
(Japan) Porsche Center Okazaki	Porsche 911 GT3 R	Porsche 4.0 L Flat-6	30	(Japan) Hiroaki Nagai	PA	2–3, 5
(Japan) Bingo Racing	Chevrolet Corvette C7 GT3-R	Chevrolet 6.2 L V8	44	(Japan) "Bankcy"	Am	5
(Japan) Bingo Racing	Chevrolet Corvette C7 GT3-R	Chevrolet 6.2 L V8	44	(Japan) Shinji Takei	Am	5
(Japan) D'station Racing	Aston Martin Vantage AMR GT3	Aston Martin M177 4.0 L Turbo V8	47	(Japan) Tomonobu Fujii	PA	2–5
(Japan) D'station Racing	Aston Martin Vantage AMR GT3	Aston Martin M177 4.0 L Turbo V8	47	(Japan) Satoshi Hoshino	PA	2–5
(Australia) AMAC Motorsport	Porsche 911 GT3 R (2017)	Porsche 4.0 L Flat-6	51	(Australia) Andrew Macpherson	Am	All
(Australia) AMAC Motorsport	Porsche 911 GT3 R (2017)	Porsche 4.0 L Flat-6	51	(Australia) William Ben Porter	Am	All
(Japan) LM Corsa	Ferrari 488 GT3 Evo 2020	Ferrari F154CB 3.9 L Turbo V8	60	(Japan) Kei Nakanishi	PA	2–5
(Japan) LM Corsa	Ferrari 488 GT3 Evo 2020	Ferrari F154CB 3.9 L Turbo V8	60	(Japan) Shigekazu Wakisaka	PA	2–5
(Japan) K-tunes Racing	Lexus RC F GT3	Lexus 2UR-GSE 5.4 L V8	96	(Japan) Morio Nitta	PA	5
(Japan) K-tunes Racing	Lexus RC F GT3	Lexus 2UR-GSE 5.4 L V8	96	(Japan) Masanori Nogami	PA	5
(Australia) Triple Eight JMR	Mercedes-AMG GT3 Evo	Mercedes-AMG M159 6.2 L V8	99	(Australia) Nick Foster	PA	All
(Australia) Triple Eight JMR	Mercedes-AMG GT3 Evo	Mercedes-AMG M159 6.2 L V8	99	(Malaysia) Prince Jefri Ibrahim	PA	All
(Australia) Triple Eight JMR	Mercedes-AMG GT3 Evo	Mercedes-AMG M159 6.2 L V8	888	(Malaysia) Prince Abu Bakar Ibrahim	PA	All
(Australia) Triple Eight JMR	Mercedes-AMG GT3 Evo	Mercedes-AMG M159 6.2 L V8	888	(Malaysia) Jazeman Jaafar	PA	All
(Japan) Car Guy Racing	Ferrari 488 GT3 Evo 2020	Ferrari F154CB 3.9 L Turbo V8	777	(Japan) Kei Cozzolino	PA	2–5
(Japan) Car Guy Racing	Ferrari 488 GT3 Evo 2020	Ferrari F154CB 3.9 L Turbo V8	777	(Japan) Takeshi Kimura	PA	2–5
GTC
(Japan) Bingo Racing	Porsche 991 GT3 II Cup	Porsche 4.0 L Flat-6	666	(Japan) "Bankcy"	Am	3
(Japan) Bingo Racing	Porsche 991 GT3 II Cup	Porsche 4.0 L Flat-6	666	(Japan) Shinji Takei	Am	3
GT4
(Japan) Comet Racing	Mercedes-AMG GT4	Mercedes-AMG M178 4.0 L V8	4	(Japan) Masaaki Fujii	Am	2–5
(Japan) Comet Racing	Mercedes-AMG GT4	Mercedes-AMG M178 4.0 L V8	4	(Japan) Kazuhiro Sakai	Am	2–5
(Japan) Koshido Racing	Toyota GR Supra GT4	BMW B58B30 3.0 L Twin Turbo I6	12	(Japan) Katsuyuki Hiranaka	SA	2–3
(Japan) Koshido Racing	Toyota GR Supra GT4	BMW B58B30 3.0 L Twin Turbo I6	12	(Japan) Motoharu Sato	SA	2–3
(Japan) GTO Racing Team	Mercedes-AMG GT4	Mercedes-AMG M178 4.0 L V8	14	(Chinese Taipei) Brian Lee	SA	2–5
(Japan) GTO Racing Team	Mercedes-AMG GT4	Mercedes-AMG M178 4.0 L V8	14	(Japan) Hideto Yasuoka	SA	2–5
(Japan) CREF Motor Sport	McLaren 570S GT4	McLaren M838T 3.8 L Turbo V8	17	(Japan) Masataka Inoue	SA	2, 5
(Japan) CREF Motor Sport	McLaren 570S GT4	McLaren M838T 3.8 L Turbo V8	17	(Japan) Yuko Suzuki	SA	2, 5
(Japan) Team GMB	Mercedes-AMG GT4	Mercedes-AMG M178 4.0 L V8	33	(Japan) Hiroaki Hatano	SA	2–5
(Japan) Team GMB	Mercedes-AMG GT4	Mercedes-AMG M178 4.0 L V8	33	(Japan) Shinya Hosokawa	SA	2–5
(Japan) Team Scala	Mercedes-AMG GT4	Mercedes-AMG M178 4.0 L V8	55	(Japan) Tatsuya Tanigawa	SA	2–3
(Japan) Team Scala	Mercedes-AMG GT4	Mercedes-AMG M178 4.0 L V8	55	(Japan) Jun Tashiro	SA	2–3
(Japan) Akiland Racing	Toyota GR Supra GT4	BMW B58B30 3.0 L Twin Turbo I6	71	(Japan) Masayoshi Oyama	Am	2–5
(Japan) Akiland Racing	Toyota GR Supra GT4	BMW B58B30 3.0 L Twin Turbo I6	71	(Japan) Masayuki Ueda	Am	2, 4–5
(Japan) Akiland Racing	Toyota GR Supra GT4	BMW B58B30 3.0 L Twin Turbo I6	71	(Japan) Makio Saito	Am	3
Invitational – TC
(Japan) Team Studie	BMW M2 ClubSport Racing	BMW B58B30 3.0 L Twin Turbo I6	3	(Japan) Takayuki Kinoshita	Am	2
(Japan) Team Studie	BMW M2 ClubSport Racing	BMW B58B30 3.0 L Twin Turbo I6	3	(Japan) Sunako Jukuchou	Am	2
(Japan) DG Motorsport	BMW M2 ClubSport Racing	BMW B58B30 3.0 L Twin Turbo I6	56	(Japan) Kazuki Ishii	Am	3
(Japan) DG Motorsport	BMW M2 ClubSport Racing	BMW B58B30 3.0 L Twin Turbo I6	56	(Japan) Takashi Kochiya	Am	3
(Japan) BMW Legal Top Racing	BMW M2 ClubSport Racing	BMW B58B30 3.0 L Twin Turbo I6	101	(Japan) Takuma Aoki	Am	3
(Japan) BMW Legal Top Racing	BMW M2 ClubSport Racing	BMW B58B30 3.0 L Twin Turbo I6	101	(Japan) Yuji Takahashi	Am	3

Icon	Class
Drivers
S	Silver Cup
PA	Pro-Am Cup
SA	Silver-Am Cup
Am	Am Cup

== Race results ==
Bold indicates overall winner for each car class (GT3 and GT4). GT3

Round		Circuit	Pole position	Silver winners	Pro/Am winners	Am winners
1	R1	(Malaysia) Sepang	(Japan) No. 27 Yogibo Racing	(Japan) No. 27 Yogibo Racing	**(Australia) No. 99 Triple Eight JMR**	(Australia) No. 51 AMAC Motorsport
1	R1	(Malaysia) Sepang	(Japan) Shogo Mitsuyama (Japan) Naoki Yokomizo	(Japan) Shogo Mitsuyama (Japan) Naoki Yokomizo	**(Australia) Nick Foster** **(Malaysia) Prince Jefri Ibrahim**	(Australia) Andrew Macpherson (Australia) William Ben Porter
1	R2	(Malaysia) Sepang	(New Zealand) No. 11 EBM Giga Racing	(Japan) No. 27 Yogibo Racing	**(New Zealand) No. 11 EBM Giga Racing**	(Australia) No. 51 AMAC Motorsport
1	R2	(Malaysia) Sepang	(New Zealand) Earl Bamber (Malaysia) Adrian D’Silva	(Japan) Shogo Mitsuyama (Japan) Naoki Yokomizo	**(New Zealand) Earl Bamber** **(Malaysia) Adrian D’Silva**	(Australia) Andrew Macpherson (Australia) Ben Porter
2	R1	(Japan) Suzuka	(Japan) No. 27 Yogibo Racing	(Thailand) No. 18 AAS Motorsport	**(Japan) No. 777 Car Guy Racing**	(Australia) No. 51 AMAC Motorsport
2	R1	(Japan) Suzuka	(Japan) Kiyoto Fujinami (Japan) Naoki Yokomizo	(Thailand) Kantadhee Kusiri (Thailand) Tanart Sathienthirakul	**(Japan) Kei Cozzolino** **(Japan) Takeshi Kimura**	(Australia) Andrew Macpherson (Australia) Ben Porter
2	R2	(Japan) Suzuka	(Japan) No. 777 Car Guy Racing	(Thailand) No. 18 AAS Motorsport	(Australia) No. 99 Triple Eight JMR	**(Japan) No. 7 Comet Racing**
2	R2	(Japan) Suzuka	(Japan) Kei Cozzolino (Japan) Takeshi Kimura	(Thailand) Kantadhee Kusiri (Thailand) Tanart Sathienthirakul	(Australia) Nick Foster (Malaysia) Prince Jefri Ibrahim	**(Japan) Yorikatsu Tsujiko** **(Japan) Yusuke Yamasaki**
3	R1	(Japan) Fuji	(Japan) No. 777 Car Guy Racing	(Japan) No. 27 Yogibo Racing	**(Japan) No. 777 Car Guy Racing**	(Japan) No. 2 Team Uematsu
3	R1	(Japan) Fuji	**(Japan) Kei Cozzolino** **(Japan) Takeshi Kimura**	(Japan) Kiyoto Fujinami (Japan) Naoki Yokomizo	(Japan) Kei Cozzolino (Japan) Takeshi Kimura	(Japan) Yudai Uchida (Japan) Tadao Uematsu
3	R2	(Japan) Fuji	(Japan) No. 777 Car Guy Racing	(Japan) No. 27 Yogibo Racing	**(Australia) No. 99 Triple Eight JMR**	(Japan) No. 19 Reap Fueling Ambitions
3	R2	(Japan) Fuji	(Japan) Kei Cozzolino (Japan) Takeshi Kimura	(Japan) Kiyoto Fujinami (Japan) Naoki Yokomizo	**(Australia) Nick Foster** **(Malaysia) Prince Jefri Ibrahim**	(Japan) Hiroshi Hamaguchi (Japan) Mineki Okura
4	R1	(Japan) SUGO	(Thailand) No. 18 AAS Motorsport	**(Japan) No. 27 Yogibo Racing**	(Japan) No. 777 Car Guy Racing	(Japan) No. 2 Team Uematsu
4	R1	(Japan) SUGO	(Thailand) Kantadhee Kusiri (Thailand) Tanart Sathienthirakul	**(Japan) Kiyoto Fujinami** **(Japan) Naoki Yokomizo**	(Japan) Kei Cozzolino (Japan) Takeshi Kimura	(Japan) Yudai Uchida (Japan) Tadao Uematsu
4	R2	(Japan) SUGO	(Japan) No. 777 Car Guy Racing	(Thailand) No. 18 AAS Motorsport	**(Japan) No. 47 D'station Racing**	(Japan) No. 19 Reap Fueling Ambitions
4	R2	(Japan) SUGO	(Japan) Kei Cozzolino (Japan) Takeshi Kimura	(Thailand) Kantadhee Kusiri (Thailand) Tanart Sathienthirakul	**(Japan) Tomonobu Fujii** **(Japan) Satoshi Hoshino**	(Japan) Hiroshi Hamaguchi (Japan) Mineki Okura
5	R1	(Japan) Okayama	(Japan) No. 27 Yogibo Racing	**(Japan) No. 27 Yogibo Racing**	(Japan) No. 777 Car Guy Racing	(Japan) No. 2 Team Uematsu
5	R1	(Japan) Okayama	(Japan) Kiyoto Fujinami (Japan) Naoki Yokomizo	**(Japan) Kiyoto Fujinami** **(Japan) Naoki Yokomizo**	(Japan) Kei Cozzolino (Japan) Takeshi Kimura	(Japan) Yudai Uchida (Japan) Tadao Uematsu
5	R2	(Japan) Okayama	(Japan) No. 47 D'station Racing	(Thailand) No. 18 AAS Motorsport	**(Japan) No. 47 D'station Racing**	(Japan) No. 19 Reap Fueling Ambitions
5	R2	(Japan) Okayama	(Japan) Tomonobu Fujii (Japan) Satoshi Hoshino	(Thailand) Kantadhee Kusiri (Thailand) Tanart Sathienthirakul	**(Japan) Tomonobu Fujii** **(Japan) Satoshi Hoshino**	(Japan) Hiroshi Hamaguchi (Japan) Mineki Okura

GT4

Round		Circuit	Pole position	GT4 Silver-Am winner	GT4 Am winner
1	R1	(Malaysia) Sepang	No Entries		
1	R2	(Malaysia) Sepang	No Entries		
2	R1	(Japan) Suzuka	(Japan) No. 55 Team Scala	**(Japan) No. 55 Team Scala**	(Japan) No. 71 Akiland Racing
2	R1	(Japan) Suzuka	(Japan) Tatsuya Tanigawa (Japan) Jun Tashiro	**(Japan) Tatsuya Tanigawa** **(Japan) Jun Tashiro**	(Japan) Masayoshi Oyama (Japan) Masayuki Ueda
2	R2	(Japan) Suzuka	(Japan) No. 33 Team GMB	**(Japan) No. 33 Team GMB**	(Japan) No. 71 Akiland Racing
2	R2	(Japan) Suzuka	(Japan) Hiroaki Hatano (Japan) Shinya Hosokawa	**(Japan) Hiroaki Hatano** **(Japan) Shinya Hosokawa**	(Japan) Masayoshi Oyama (Japan) Masayuki Ueda
3	R1	(Japan) Fuji	(Japan) No. 55 Team Scala	**(Japan) No. 12 Koshido Racing**	(Japan) No. 71 Akiland Racing
3	R1	(Japan) Fuji	(Japan) Tatsuya Tanigawa (Japan) Jun Tashiro	**(Japan) Katsuyuki Hiranaka** **(Japan) Motoharu Sato**	(Japan) Masayoshi Oyama (Japan) Makio Saito
3	R2	(Japan) Fuji	(Japan) No. 12 Koshido Racing	**(Japan) No. 55 Team Scala**	(Japan) No. 71 Akiland Racing
3	R2	(Japan) Fuji	(Japan) Katsuyuki Hiranaka (Japan) Motoharu Sato	**(Japan) Tatsuya Tanigawa** **(Japan) Jun Tashiro**	(Japan) Masayoshi Oyama (Japan) Makio Saito
4	R1	(Japan) SUGO	(Japan) No. 71 Akiland Racing	**(Japan) No. 14 GTO Racing Team**	(Japan) No. 71 Akiland Racing
4	R1	(Japan) SUGO	(Japan) Masayoshi Oyama (Japan) Masayuki Ueda	**(Chinese Taipei) Brian Lee** **(Japan) Hideto Yasuoka**	(Japan) Masayoshi Oyama (Japan) Masayuki Ueda
4	R2	(Japan) SUGO	(Japan) No. 14 GTO Racing Team	(Japan) No. 14 GTO Racing Team	**(Japan) No. 71 Akiland Racing**
4	R2	(Japan) SUGO	(Chinese Taipei) Brian Lee (Japan) Hideto Yasuoka	(Chinese Taipei) Brian Lee (Japan) Hideto Yasuoka	**(Japan) Masayoshi Oyama** **(Japan) Masayuki Ueda**
5	R1	(Japan) Okayama	(Japan) No. 14 GTO Racing Team	**(Japan) No. 14 GTO Racing Team**	(Japan) No. 71 Akiland Racing
5	R1	(Japan) Okayama	(Chinese Taipei) Brian Lee (Japan) Hideto Yasuoka	**(Chinese Taipei) Brian Lee** **(Japan) Hideto Yasuoka**	(Japan) Masayoshi Oyama (Japan) Masayuki Ueda
5	R2	(Japan) Okayama	(Japan) No. 33 Team GMB	**(Japan) No. 14 GTO Racing Team**	(Japan) No. 71 Akiland Racing
5	R2	(Japan) Okayama	(Japan) Hiroaki Hatano (Japan) Shinya Hosokawa	**(Chinese Taipei) Brian Lee** **(Japan) Hideto Yasuoka**	(Japan) Masayoshi Oyama (Japan) Masayuki Ueda

== Championship standings ==
Scoring system

Championship points are awarded for the first ten positions in each race. Entries are required to complete 75% of the winning car's race distance in order to be classified and earn points. Individual drivers are required to participate for a minimum of 25 minutes in order to earn championship points in any race.

Position	**1st**	**2nd**	**3rd**	**4th**	**5th**	**6th**	**7th**	**8th**	**9th**	**10th**
Points	25	18	15	12	10	8	6	4	2	1

=== Drivers' championships ===
==== Overall ====
Pos.	Driver	Team	SEP (Malaysia)		SUZ (Japan)		FUJ (Japan)		SUG (Japan)		OKA (Japan)		Points	JC
GT3
1	(Japan) Kei Cozzolino (Japan) Takeshi Kimura	(Japan) Car Guy Racing			1	**5**	**1**	**3**	2	**3**	2	12	126	151
2	(Australia) Nick Foster (Malaysia) Prince Jefri Ibrahim	(Australia) Triple Eight JMR	1	5	3	2	4	1	9	10	3	13	123	–
3	(Japan) Naoki Yokomizo	(Japan) Yogibo Racing	**4**	4	**Ret**	13	2	4	1	15	**1**	6	112	–
4	(Japan) Kiyoto Fujinami	(Japan) Yogibo Racing			**Ret**	13	2	4	1	15	**1**	6	88	–
5	(Japan) Tomonobu Fujii (Japan) Satoshi Hoshino	(Japan) D'station Racing			8	18	6	9	3	1	8	**1**	83	121
6	(Japan) Seiji Ara (Japan) Tomohide Yamaguchi	(Japan) PLUS with BMW Team Studie			6	3	Ret	15	4	2	14	2	71	87
7	(Thailand) Tanart Sathienthirakul (Thailand) Kantadhee Kusiri	(New Zealand) EBM Giga Racing			4	8							68	–
7	(Thailand) Tanart Sathienthirakul (Thailand) Kantadhee Kusiri	(New Zealand) AAS Motorsport					3	5	**7**	5	10	5	68	–
8	(Japan) Yuta Kamimura (Japan) Hiroaki Nagai	(Japan) Porsche Center Okazaki			2	Ret	5	2			7	3	67	91
9	(Malaysia) Prince Abu Bakar Ibrahim (Malaysia) Jazeman Jaafar	(Australia) Triple Eight JMR	6	2	9	12	9	Ret	Ret	4	6	4	62	–
10	(New Zealand) Reid Harker (Indonesia) Setiawan Santoso	(New Zealand) EBM Giga Racing	3	3	15	Ret	10	12	Ret	6	5	8	53	–
11	(New Zealand) Earl Bamber (Malaysia) Adrian D’Silva	(New Zealand) EBM Giga Racing	2	**1**									43	–
12	(Japan) Hiroshi Koizumi (Japan) Keita Sawa	(Japan) ABSSA Motorsport			12	7	15	6	6	13	4	14	34	75
13	(China) David Pun	(Hong Kong) Elf Bar Racing Team X Works	Ret	8	WD	WD							31	–
13	(China) David Pun	(Hong Kong) Audi Sport Asia Team X Works			7	10	7	8					31	–
13	(China) David Pun	(Hong Kong) X Works							5	19			31	–
14	(Japan) Yorikatsu Tsujiko (Japan) Yusuke Yamasaki	(Japan) Comet Racing			14	1	13	13	14	8	12	11	30	67
15	(Japan) Hiroshi Hamaguchi (Japan) Mineki Okura	(Japan) B-Max Engineering			11	4							30	65
15	(Japan) Hiroshi Hamaguchi (Japan) Mineki Okura	(Japan) Reap Fueling Ambitions					Ret	7	11	7	Ret	7	30	65
16	(Australia) Andrew Macpherson (Australia) William Ben Porter	(Australia) AMAC Motorsport	5	7	10	6	12	14	12	12	13	20†	25	–
17	(Japan) Shogo Mitsuyama	(Japan) Yogibo Racing	**4**	4									24	–
18	(Hong Kong) Shaun Thong	(Hong Kong) Elf Bar Racing Team X Works	Ret	8	WD	WD							24	–
18	(Hong Kong) Shaun Thong	(Hong Kong) Audi Sport Asia Team X Works					7	8					24	–
18	(Hong Kong) Shaun Thong	(Hong Kong) X Works							5	19			24	–
19	(Thailand) Sandy Stuvik	(Hong Kong) Audi Sport Asia Team X Works	7	6	7	10							21	–
20	(Japan) Kei Nakanishi (Japan) Shigekazu Wakisaka	(Japan) LM Corsa			5	9	11	11	10	9	9	18	17	67
21	(Australia) Yasser Shahin	(Hong Kong) Audi Sport Asia Team X Works	7	6									14	–
22	(Japan) Yudai Uchida (Japan) Tadao Uematsu	(Japan) Team Uematsu			13	Ret	8	10	8	11	11	9	11	58
–	(Japan) Motohiro Ogura (Japan) Akihiro Tsuzuki	(Japan) Audi Team Hitotsuyama							13	14			0	0
–	(Hong Kong) Marchy Lee	(Hong Kong) Audi Sport Asia Team X Works			WD	WD							0	–
Entries ineligible to score points
–	(Japan) "Bankcy" (Japan) Shinji Takei	(Japan) Bingo Racing									17	10	–	–
–	(Japan) Masanori Nogami (Japan) Morio Nitta	(Japan) K-tunes Racing									18	15	–	–
GTC
1	(Japan) "Bankcy" (Japan) Shinji Takei	(Japan) Bingo Racing					**14**	**16**					50	50
GT4
1	(Chinese Taipei) Brian Lee (Japan) Hideto Yasuoka	(Japan) GTO Racing Team			17	15	18	20	15	**17**	**15**	16	153	–
2	(Japan) Hirokai Hatano (Japan) Shinya Hosokawa	(Japan) Team GMB			19	**11**	19	19	16	18	19	**17**	130	156
3	(Japan) Masayoshi Oyama	(Japan) Akiland Racing			20	16	20	21	**17**	16	20	19	109	127
4	(Japan) Masayuki Ueda	(Japan) Akiland Racing			20	16			**17**	16	20	19	89	103
5	(Japan) Tatsuya Tanigawa (Japan) Jun Tashiro	(Japan) Team Scala			**16**	19	**17**	17					76	78
6	(Japan) Katsuyuki Hiranaka (Japan) Motoharu Sato	(Japan) Koshido Racing			18	14	16	**18**					76	79
7	(Japan) Kazuhiro Sakai (Japan) Masaaki Fujii	(Japan) Comet Racing			23	17	22	23	18	Ret	21	22	64	79
8	(Japan) Masataka Inoue (Japan) Yuko Suzuki	(Japan) CREF Motor Sport			22	Ret					16	21	38	50
9	(Japan) Makio Saito	(Japan) Akiland Racing					20	21					20	24
INV – TC
–	(Japan) Kazuki Ishii (Japan) Takashi Kochiya	(Japan) DG Motorsport					**21**	**22**					–	–
–	(Japan) Sunako Jukuchou (Japan) Takayuki Kinoshita	(Japan) Team Studie			**21**	**Ret**							–	–
–	(Japan) Takuma Aoki (Japan) Yuji Takahashi	(Japan) BMW Legal Top Racing					Ret	24					–	–
Pos.	Driver	Team	SEP (Malaysia)		SUZ (Japan)		FUJ (Japan)		SUG (Japan)		OKA (Japan)		Points	JC

Colour	Result
Gold	Winner
Silver	Second place
Bronze	Third place
Green	Points classification
Blue	Non-points classification
Blue	Non-classified finish (NC)
Purple	Retired, not classified (Ret)
Red	Did not qualify (DNQ)
Red	Did not pre-qualify (DNPQ)
Black	Disqualified (DSQ)
White	Did not start (DNS)
White	Withdrew (WD)
White	Race cancelled (C)
Blank	Did not practice (DNP)
Blank	Did not arrive (DNA)
Blank	Excluded (EX)

**Bold** – Pole
Italics – Fastest Lap

Notes:

- † – Drivers did not finish the race, but were classified as they completed more than 90% of the race distance.

==== Pro-Am Cup ====
Pos.	Driver	Team	SEP (Malaysia)		SUZ (Japan)		FUJ (Japan)		SUG (Japan)		OKA (Japan)		Points	JC
GT3
1	(Australia) Nick Foster (Malaysia) Prince Jefri Ibrahim	(Australia) Triple Eight JMR	1	5	3	2	4	1	9	10	3	13	158	–
2	(Japan) Kei Cozzolino (Japan) Takeshi Kimura	(Japan) Car Guy Racing			**1**	**5**	**1**	**3**	2	**3**	2	12	153	163
3	(Japan) Tomonobu Fujii (Japan) Satoshi Hoshino	(Japan) D'station Racing			8	18	6	9	**3**	1	**8**	**1**	104	127
4	(Japan) Seiji Ara (Japan) Tomohide Yamaguchi	(Japan) PLUS with BMW Team Studie			6	3	Ret	15	4	2	14	2	83	104
5	(Malaysia) Prince Abu Bakar Ibrahim (Malaysia) Jazeman Jaafar	(Australia) Triple Eight JMR	6	2	9	12	9	Ret	Ret	4	6	4	82	–
6	(Japan) Yuta Kamimura (Japan) Hiroaki Nagai	(Japan) Porsche Center Okazaki			2	Ret	5	2			7	3	74	91
7	(New Zealand) Reid Harker (Indonesia) Setiawan Santoso	(New Zealand) EBM Giga Racing	3	3	13	Ret	10	12	Ret	6	5	8	73	–
8	(Japan) Hiroshi Koizumi (Japan) Keita Sawa	(Japan) ABSSA Motorsport			12	7	15	6	6	13	4	14	61	98
9	(China) David Pun	(Hong Kong) Elf Bar Racing Team X Works	Ret	8	WD	WD							58	–
9	(China) David Pun	(Hong Kong) Audi Sport Asia Team X Works			7	10	7	8					58	–
9	(China) David Pun	(Hong Kong) X Works							5	19			58	–
10	(Japan) Kei Nakanishi (Japan) Shigekazu Wakisaka	(Japan) LM Corsa			5	9	11	11	10	9	9	18	52	89
11	(New Zealand) Earl Bamber (Malaysia) Adrian D’Silva	(New Zealand) EBM Giga Racing	**2**	**1**									43	–
12	(Hong Kong) Shaun Thong	(Hong Kong) Elf Bar Racing Team X Works	Ret	8	WD	WD							42	–
12	(Hong Kong) Shaun Thong	(Hong Kong) Audi Sport Asia Team X Works					7	8					42	–
12	(Hong Kong) Shaun Thong	(Hong Kong) X Works							5	19			42	–
13	(Thailand) Sandy Stuvik	(Hong Kong) Audi Sport Asia Team X Works	7	6	7	10							36	–
14	(Australia) Yasser Shahin (Thailand) Sandy Stuvik	(Hong Kong) Audi Sport Asia Team X Works	7	6									20	–
–	(Hong Kong) Marchy Lee	(Hong Kong) Audi Sport Asia Team X Works			WD	WD							0	–
Entries ineligible to score points
–	(Japan) Masanori Nogami (Japan) Morio Nitta	(Japan) K-tunes Racing									18	15	–	–
Pos.	Driver	Team	SEP (Malaysia)		SUZ (Japan)		FUJ (Japan)		SUG (Japan)		OKA (Japan)		Points	JC

==== Silver Cup ====
Pos.	Driver	Team	SEP (Malaysia)		SUZ (Japan)		FUJ (Japan)		SUG (Japan)		OKA (Japan)		Points
GT3
1	(Japan) Naoki Yokomizo	(Japan) Yogibo Racing	**4**	**4**	**Ret**	**13**	**2**	**4**	1	**15**	**1**	6	204
2	(Thailand) Tanart Sathienthirakul (Thailand) Kantadhee Kusiri	(New Zealand) AAS Motorsport			4	8							172
2	(Thailand) Tanart Sathienthirakul (Thailand) Kantadhee Kusiri	(New Zealand) AAS Motorsport					3	5	**7**	5	10	**5**	172
3	(Japan) Kiyoto Fujinami	(Japan) Yogibo Racing			**Ret**	**13**	**2**	**4**	1	**15**	**1**	6	154
4	(Japan) Shogo Mitsuyama	(Japan) Yogibo Racing	**4**	**4**									50
Pos.	Driver	Team	SEP (Malaysia)		SUZ (Japan)		FUJ (Japan)		SUG (Japan)		OKA (Japan)		Points

==== Silver-Am Cup ====
Pos.	Driver	Team	SEP (Malaysia)	SUZ (Japan)		FUJ (Japan)		SUG (Japan)		OKA (Japan)		Points	JC
GT4
1	(Chinese Taipei) Brian Lee (Japan) Hideto Yasuoka	(Japan) GTO Racing Team		17	15	18	20	**15**	**17**	**15**	16	160	–
2	(Japan) Hirokai Hatano (Japan) Shinya Hosokawa	(Japan) Team GMB		19	**11**	19	19	16	18	19	**17**	133	163
3	(Japan) Tatsuya Tanigawa (Japan) Jun Tashiro	(Japan) Team Scala		**16**	19	**17**	17					80	83
4	(Japan) Katsuyuki Hiranaka (Japan) Motoharu Sato	(Japan) TGR Team Koshido Racing		18	14	16	**18**					76	79
5	(Japan) Masataka Inoue (Japan) Yuko Suzuki	(Japan) CREF Motor Sport		22	Ret					16	21	43	55
Pos.	Driver	Team	SEP (Malaysia)	SUZ (Japan)		FUJ (Japan)		SUG (Japan)		OKA (Japan)		Points	JC

==== Am Cup ====
Pos.	Driver	Team	SEP (Malaysia)		SUZ (Japan)		FUJ (Japan)		SUG (Japan)		OKA (Japan)		Points	JC
GT3
1	(Australia) Andrew Macpherson (Australia) Ben Porter	(Australia) AMAC Motorsport	**5**	**7**	10	6	12	14	12	12	13	20†	174	–
2	(Japan) Yudai Uchida (Japan) Tadao Uematsu	(Japan) Team Uematsu			13	**Ret**	8	**10**	**8**	**11**	11	**9**	141	144
3	(Japan) Yorikatsu Tsujiko (Japan) Yusuke Yamasaki	(Japan) Comet Racing			14	1	13	13	14	8	12	11	130	139
4	(Japan) Hiroshi Hamaguchi (Japan) Mineki Okura	(Japan) B-Max Engineering			**11**	4							129	136
4	(Japan) Hiroshi Hamaguchi (Japan) Mineki Okura	(Japan) Reap Fueling Ambitions					**Ret**	7	11	7	**Ret**	7	129	136
–	(Japan) Motohiro Ogura (Japan) Akihiro Tsuzuki	(Japan) Audi Team Hitotsuyama							13	14			0^{[1]}	0^{[1]}
Entries ineligible to score points
–	(Japan) "Bankcy" (Japan) Shinji Takei	(Japan) Bingo Racing									17	10	–	–
GTC
1	(Japan) "Bankcy" (Japan) Shinji Takei	(Japan) Bingo Racing					**14**	**16**					50	50
GT4
1	(Japan) Masayoshi Oyama	(Japan) TGR Team Akiland Racing			**20**	**16**	**20**	**21**	**17**	**16**	**20**	**19**	200	200
2	(Japan) Masayuki Ueda	(Japan) TGR Team Akiland Racing			**20**	**16**			**17**	**16**	**20**	**19**	150	150
3	(Japan) Kazuhiro Sakai (Japan) Masaaki Fujii	(Japan) Comet Racing			23	17	22	23	18	Ret	21	22	126	126
4	(Japan) Makio Saito	(Japan) TGR Team Akiland Racing					**20**	**21**					50	50
INV – TC
–	(Japan) Kazuki Ishii (Japan) Takashi Kochiya	(Japan) DG Motorsport					**21**	**22**					–	–
–	(Japan) Sunako Jukuchou (Japan) Takayuki Kinoshita	(Japan) Team Studie			**21**	**Ret**							–	–
–	(Japan) Takuma Aoki (Japan) Yuji Takahashi	(Japan) BMW Legal Top Racing					Ret	24					–	–
Pos.	Driver	Team	SEP (Malaysia)		SUZ (Japan)		FUJ (Japan)		SUG (Japan)		OKA (Japan)		Points	JC

Notes:

- † – Drivers did not finish the race, but were classified as they completed more than 90% of the race distance.

=== Teams' championship ===
Only the two best results of a team per race counted towards the Teams' championship.

Pos.	Team	SEP (Malaysia)		SUZ (Japan)		FUJ (Japan)		SUG (Japan)		OKA (Japan)		Points
GT3
1	(Australia) Triple Eight JMR	1	2	3	2	4	1	9	4	3	4	185
1	(Australia) Triple Eight JMR	6	5	9	12	9	Ret	Ret	10	6	13	185
2	(Japan) Car Guy Racing			1	5	1	3	2	3	2	12	126
3	(New Zealand) EBM Giga Racing	2	1	4	8	3	5	7	5	2	5	121
3	(New Zealand) EBM Giga Racing	3	3	15	Ret	10	12	Ret	6	10	8	121
4	(Japan) Yogibo Racing	4	4	Ret	13	2	4	1	15	1	6	112
5	(Japan) D'station Racing			8	18	6	9	3	1	8	1	83
6	(Japan) PLUS with BMW Team Studie			6	3	Ret	15	4	2	14	2	71
7	(Japan) Porsche Center Okazaki			2	Ret	5	2			7	3	67
8	(Hong Kong) Audi Sport Asia Team X Works	7	6	7	10	7	8	5	19			45
8	(Hong Kong) Audi Sport Asia Team X Works	Ret	8	WD	WD							45
9	(Japan) ABSSA Motorsport			12	7	15	6	6	13	4	14	34
10	(Japan) Comet Racing			14	1	13	13	14	8	12	11	30
11	(Japan) Reap Fueling Ambitions			11	4	Ret	7	11	7	Ret	7	30
12	(Australia) AMAC Motorsport	5	7	10	6	12	14	12	12	13	20†	25
13	(Japan) LM Corsa			5	9	11	11	10	9	9	18	17
14	(Japan) Team Uematsu			13	Ret	8	10	8	11	11	9	11
–	(Japan) Audi Team Hitotsuyama							13	14			0
GT4
1	(Japan) GTO Racing Team			17	15	18	20	15	17	15	16	153
2	(Japan) Team GMB			19	11	19	19	16	18	19	17	130
3	(Japan) Akiland Racing			20	16	20	21	17	16	20	19	109
4	(Japan) Team Scala			16	19	17	17					76
5	(Japan) Koshido Racing			18	14	16	18					76
6	(Japan) Comet Racing			23	17	22	23	18	Ret	21	22	64
7	(Japan) CREF Motor Sport			22	Ret					16	21	38
Pos.	Team	SEP (Malaysia)		SUZ (Japan)		FUJ (Japan)		SUG (Japan)		OKA (Japan)		Points

== See also ==
- 2022 British GT Championship
- 2022 GT World Challenge Europe
- 2022 GT World Challenge Europe Endurance Cup
- 2022 GT World Challenge Europe Sprint Cup
- 2022 GT World Challenge America
- 2022 GT World Challenge Australia
- 2022 Intercontinental GT Challenge

== Notes ==
^{1} Despite entering into the Am Cup and Japan Cup, Motohiro Ogura and Akihiro Tsuzuki did not receive Am Cup or Japan Cup points as they did finish in the overall GT3 points.
