= Hagg (surname) =

Hagg is a surname. Notable people with the surname include:

- Arthur Ernest Hagg (1888–1985), British aircraft and boat designer
- Eric Hagg (born 1989), former American football safety
- Henry Hagg, the namesake of the Henry Hagg Lake
- Russell Hagg (born 1938), Australian designer and director

== See also ==
- Hag (disambiguation)
