= Hägg =

Hägg is a Swedish surname. Hägg is also the Swedish name for the bird cherry (Prunus padus), a species of cherry native to northern Europe. Hägg was commonly included on the listing of soldier's names taken from nature. Notable people with the surname include:

- Carina Hägg (born 1957), Swedish Social Democratic politician
- Göran Hägg (1947–2015), Swedish author and critic
- Gunder Hägg (1918–2004), Swedish runner and multiple world record breaker of the 1940s
- Gunnar Hägg (1903–1986), Swedish chemist and crystallographer
- Gustaf Hägg (1867–1925), Swedish organist and composer
- Jacob Hägg (1839–1931), Swedish admiral and marine artist
- Jacob Adolf Hägg (1850–1928), Swedish composer
- May-Britt Hägg, Norwegian chemical engineer
- Mia Hägg (born 1970), Swedish architect based in Paris, France
- Robert Hägg, Swedish hockey player

== See also ==
- Hagg (disambiguation)
