= Misato Haga =

Japanese motorsport executive (born 1979)

- Born: 15 February 1979 (age 47); Iwate Prefecture, Japan
- Occupations: Motorsport executive; businesswoman
- Employers: Super GT; Direxiv (2005–2006); AVANZZA × BOMEX (2007); MOLA (2008); Drago Corse (2021); Yogibo Racing (2023); MKS Racing (2025–present); Super Formula; Direxiv (2006); Team Goh (2026); GT World Challenge Asia; Yogibo Racing (2022)
- Title: Team Principal

Misato Haga (芳賀 美里, Haga Misato; born 15 February 1979) is a Japanese motorsport executive who serves as the team principal for MKS racing in the GT300 class of Super GT and Team Goh in Super Formula

== Career ==
Born in Iwate Prefecture, Haga's interest for motorsport was sparked after attending races at Sportsland Sugo as a spectator while attending high school. Following that, Haga entered the world of entertainment and began working as a race queen for both Hitotsuyama Racing and R&D Sport in the early 2000s. While there, she created an agency for race queens in 2003, which led her to meet an investor who sponsored Jean Alesi's French driver training programme. After talking with Alesi, Direxiv was founded in mid-2004 with the Frenchman as the project's leader in Europe and Haga as the leader in Japan. The team also joined forces with McLaren to essentially be its B-team if Direxiv were to successfully join Formula One. While Direxiv became David Price Racing's title sponsor in GP2 and sponsored other drivers in the same series, Haga led the Formula Nippon and Super GT programmes in Japan.

In March 2006, Direxiv applied to enter the Formula One grid in 2008 as its 12th team. However, the entry was denied in August of that year without explanation. Direxiv subsequently lost funding and immediately shut down their motorsport operations. Under Haga's leadership, the team was leading the GT300 standings with Shogo Mitsuyama and Nobuteru Taniguchi at the time Direxiv withdrew from the series. Following Direxiv's demise, Haga became Avanzza Bomex's team director in 2007. After a scoreless season, Haga joined MOLA to become its team director as the team fielded Kazuki Hoshino and Hironobu Yasuda. With Haga as team director, the team won the sixth race of the season at Suzuka and at the season-ending round at Fuji, Mola won both the drivers' and teams' titles.

Following a 13-year hiatus, Haga returned to Super GT, once again as a team director, this time for Yogibo-sponsored Drago Corse in 2021. The team finished 19th in the team's standings, with a best race result of sixth at Sportsland Sugo. Staying with the Yogibo brand for 2022, Haga became B-Max Racing Team-run Yogibo Racing's team director in GT World Challenge Asia. In her only season as a team director in the series, the team won at Sugo and Okayama to finish fourth in the team's standings. Returning to Super GT in 2023, Haga remained with Yogibo Racing as they fielded Yugo Iwasawa and Reimei Ito. The team ended the season 19th in the standings with a best result of fourth at Okayama. Following the season, Yogibo withdrew from Super GT competition, leaving Haga on the sidelines.

On 18 February 2025, it was revealed that Haga would return to Super GT with her own team, MKS Racing (Misato Knockout Sport Racing). After failing to strike a partnership deal with various partners, Haga successfully established a partnership with Takeshi Kimura's CarGuy Racing to rebrand the team to MKS CarGuy Racing. A month later, the driver lineup was finalized as Rikuto Kobayashi and Zak O'Sullivan would drive on a full-time basis for the team, with Kimura and Keita Sawa serving as reserves for the 2025 season. In the team's first season, the Kobayashi-O'Sullivan pair won at Suzuka and finished second at Autopolis to end the year fourth in the team's standings.

The following year, CarGuy MKS Racing retained O'Sullivan, and paired him up with Reimei Ito and Kiyoshi Umegaki for the team's second season in the series. Also in 2026, Haga joined Team Goh as its team director in Super Formula, marking her return to the series after 20 years.
