= Chag =

Chag may refer to:

- Christian Health Association of Ghana (CHAG)
- Chag (Jewish holiday), (חג in Hebrew, plural: Chagim) the transliteration from Hebrew meaning "holiday"
- Niraj Chag (born 1976), London-based musical artist and composer

== See also ==
- Chaga people, a sub-group in Tanzania
