= Marcelius Haga =

Norwegian politician (1882–1968)

Marcelius Haga (29 September 1882 – 2 December 1968) was a Norwegian politician.

Born in Høyland Municipality, he graduated from the Stord Teacher's College in 1902. He then worked as a teacher for four years before enrolling at the Norwegian College of Agriculture. He graduated there in 1908, and worked as a research fellow the following year. He then worked as a school teacher and manager as well as farmer the rest of his professional life, including two years at the Teacher's College at Notodden (today a part of Telemark University College).

Settling in Nes Municipality in Buskerud, Marcelius Haga served as mayor of Nes Municipality from 1919 to 1934. From 1928 to 1931 he was also the chairman of Buskerud county council. He also served as a deputy representative for the Liberal Party to the Parliament of Norway from 1937, representing Buskerud county. He had previously headed the Liberal Party ballot in 1930, unsuccessfully.

However, he later joined the fascist party Nasjonal Samling which governed Norway during parts of the German occupation of the country. He was then a Nazi-installed mayor of Nes. As a part of the legal purge in Norway after World War II he was sentenced to loss of civil rights, plus a fine.
