= Ingebrigt Belle =

Norwegian peasant agitator

Ingebrigt Belle (1 December 1773 – 29 March 1845) was a Norwegian peasant agitator.
