= Night hag (disambiguation) =

Night hag may refer to:

- Sleep paralysis in folklore or night-mare, a folkloristic explanation of sleep paralysis
- Nocnitsa, a nightmare spirit in Slavic mythology
- Lilith, a monster in Jewish mythology
- Night hag (Dungeons & Dragons)
- the Night Hag (Neverwinter Nights)
- Night Hag, a track from the Earth Rocker album by Clutch
