= Hags (restaurant) =

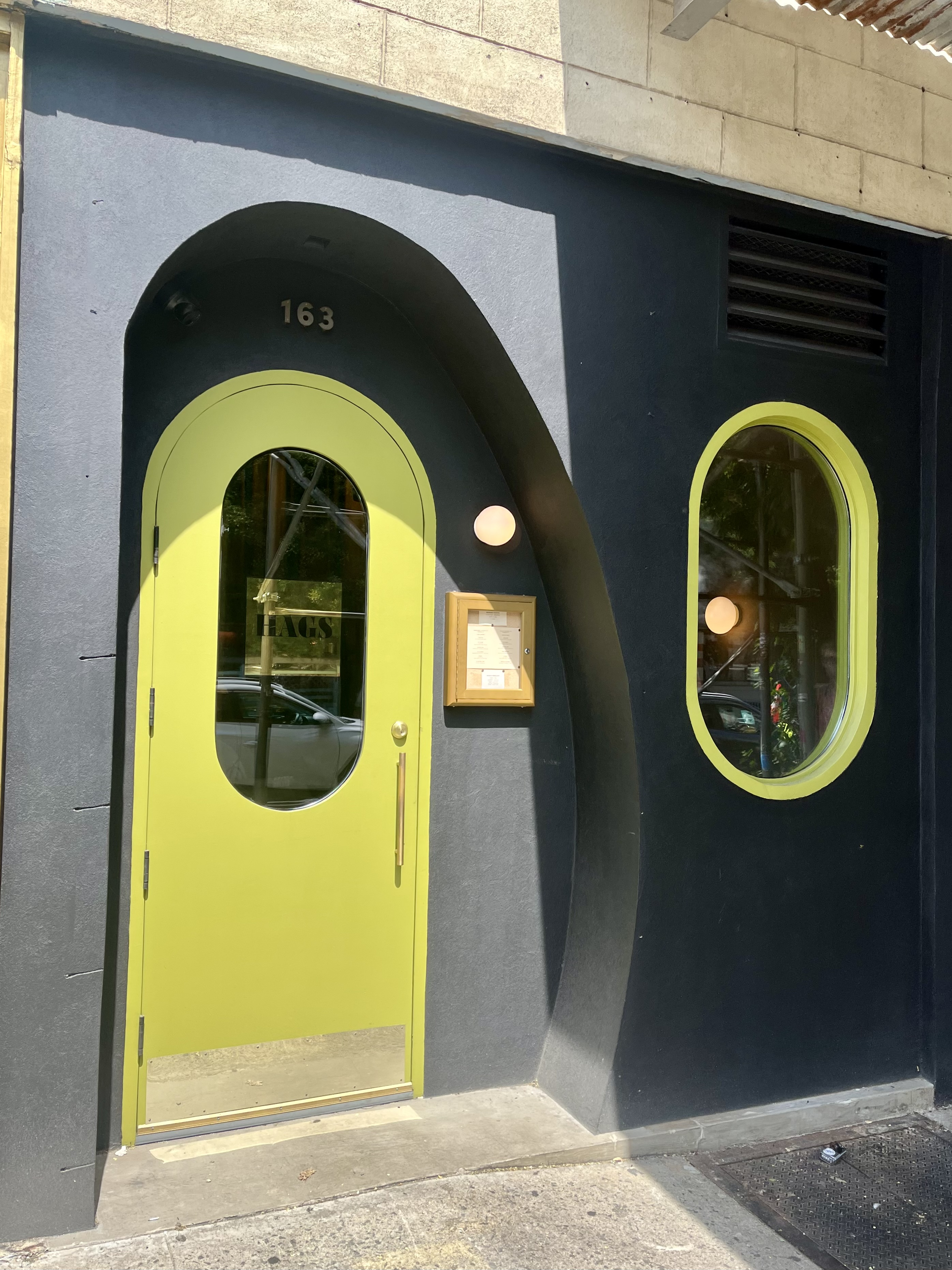
- The restaurant's exterior in 2024
- Interactive map of Hags

Restaurant information
- Head chef: Telly Justice
- Food type: Seasonal American
- Location: 163 1st Avenue, New York, New York, United States
- Coordinates: 40°43′44″N 73°59′04″W
- Seating capacity: 20
- Reservations: Recommended (none on Sunday)
- Website: hagsnyc.com

Hags (stylized HAGS) is an American cuisine restaurant in the East Village neighborhood of New York City.

== History ==
The restaurant was opened in 2022 by chef Telly Justice and sommelier Camille Lindsley under the slogan "By Queer people, for all people." The restaurant servers two tasting menus with an "omnivore" and "vegan" option along with wine pairings and "Pay What You Can Sundays". Due to issues with the space occupied by the restaurant, HAGS temporarily closed two months after it opened. The restaurant reopened after three months. Upon reopening, the restaurant's menu changed to focus on vegetarian and vegan options.

The restaurant closed temporarily in October 2026, in advance of a relocation from the East Village to a new location in Noho.

== Reviews and accolades ==
In a positive review published by The New Yorker, Hannah Goldfield praised the restaurant's atmosphere as "relaxed and convivial".

Justice won the Michelin Guide Young Chef Award in 2023.
