= SS Haga =

Haga was the name of at least two steamships:

- SS Haga (1918), built by Sölvesborgs Skeppsvarf. Sunk in 1940 by enemy action
- SS Haga (1938), built by Flensberger Schiffsbau-Gesellschaft, in service 1938–45
