= Mahito Haga =

Japanese gymnast

- 芳賀 真人
- Born: 29 November 1908 Tokyo, Empire of Japan
- Died: 16 January 1939 (aged 30)

Gymnastics career
- Discipline: Men's artistic gymnastics
- Country represented: Japan
- Club: Waseda University

Mahito Haga (芳賀 真人, Haga Mahito; 29 November 1908 – 16 January 1939) was a Japanese gymnast. He competed in two events at the 1932 Summer Olympics.
