= David Haggo =

Scottish cricketer (born 1964)

Personal information
- Full name: David John Haggo
- Born: 13 April 1964 (age 62); Ayr, Scotland
- Batting: Right-handed
- Role: Wicket-keeper
- Relatives: Samantha Haggo (Niece)

Career statistics
Competition	First-class	List A
Matches	5	18
Runs scored	140	109
Batting average	20.00	13.62
100s/50s	0/0	0/0
Top score	45	25
Catches/stumpings	6/4	9/6
- Source: ESPN cricinfo, 19 April 2016

David John Haggo (born 13 April 1964) is a Scottish cricketer who played five First-class and 18 List A matches for Scotland national cricket team from 1983 to 1995 including in 1989 Benson & Hedges Cup till 1995 Benson & Hedges Cup. Domestically, Haggo played for the Prestwick Cricket Club in the Scottish National Cricket League (SNCL) as well as with West of Scotland Cricket Club.
