= Yogibo =

Japanese-American furniture retailer

Yogibo LLC.
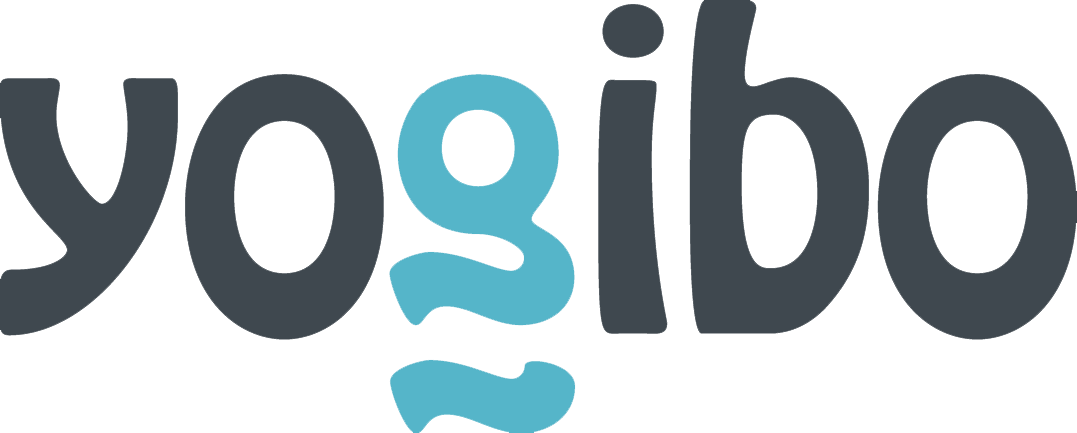

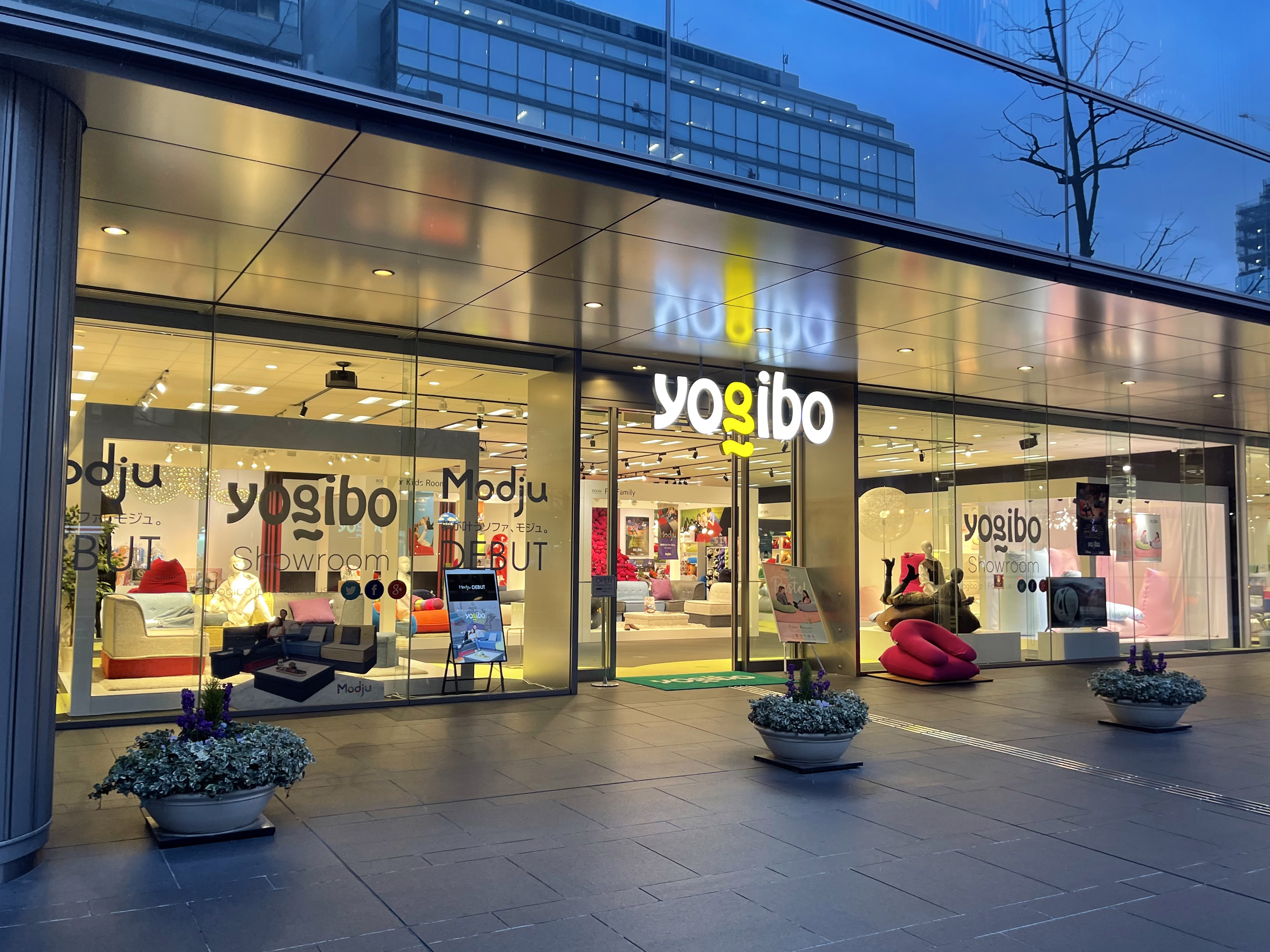
- Yogibo Store in Midosuji, Japan
- Type: Private
- Industry: Home furnishings and lifestyle
- Founded: 2009; 17 years ago in Nashua, New Hampshire United States
- Founder: Eyal Levy
- Headquarters: Nashua, New Hampshire, United States
- Number of locations: 130 stores (2022)
- Area served: Worldwide
- Website: yogibo.jp Japan yogibo.com USA

Yogibo is a lifestyle furniture retailer, specializing in bean bag chairs and accessories. It also sells dog beds and Jogoball, an audio gaming console.

An Yogibo Old Logo of 2009-10

As of March 2023, Yogibo has reduced from over US$60 million in retail sales and over 130 retail outlets worldwide to an online only retailer.

== History ==
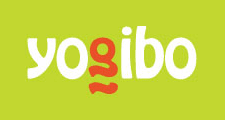
An Yogibo Old Logo from 2010s

Yogibo was created in early 2000s by Eyal Levy, when his wife was trying to find a way to make her pregnancy comfortable. In 2009, the company started operating in Nashua, New Hampshire and opened its first store in Natick, Massachusetts in 2010. The company has retail stores in the United States and has expanded in Canada, Japan, South Korea, Taiwan, Thailand and more through distribution in those countries. Yogibo's manufacturing facility is located in Nashua, New Hampshire.

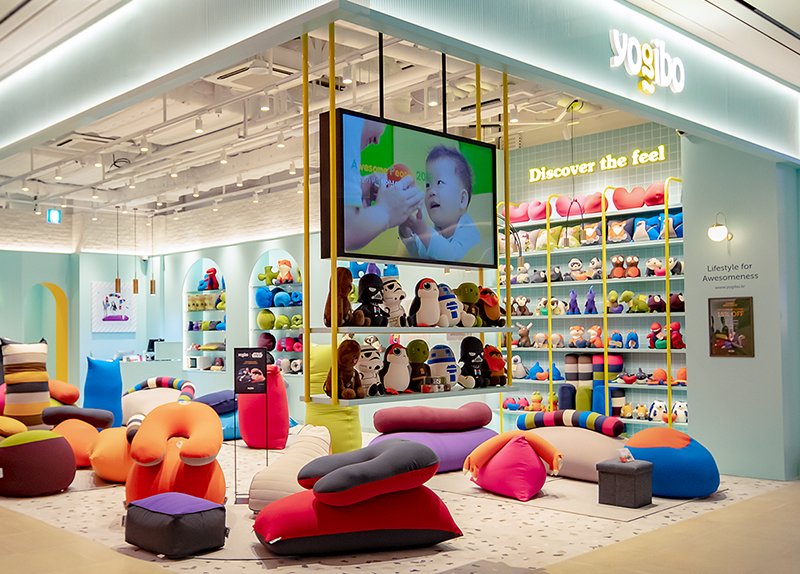
An Yogibo Store in South Korea

Yogibo was the first certified sensory-inclusive retail chain in collaboration with KultureCity, a company which certifies and provides training to organizations. The two companies have collaboratively built sensory rooms in NBA, NFL, and MLB arenas in the country.

In 2016, Yogibo held the Guinness world record for the world's largest bean bag chair. In the same year, Yogibo established a subsidiary in Korea, Yogibo Korea, Inc. David Park of the co-founding company is a close friend of Levy. The name "Yogibo" is pronounced the same as "여기보" in Korean. Its meaning is 'Look Here'. "We think it'll be a great fit" Levy said at time.

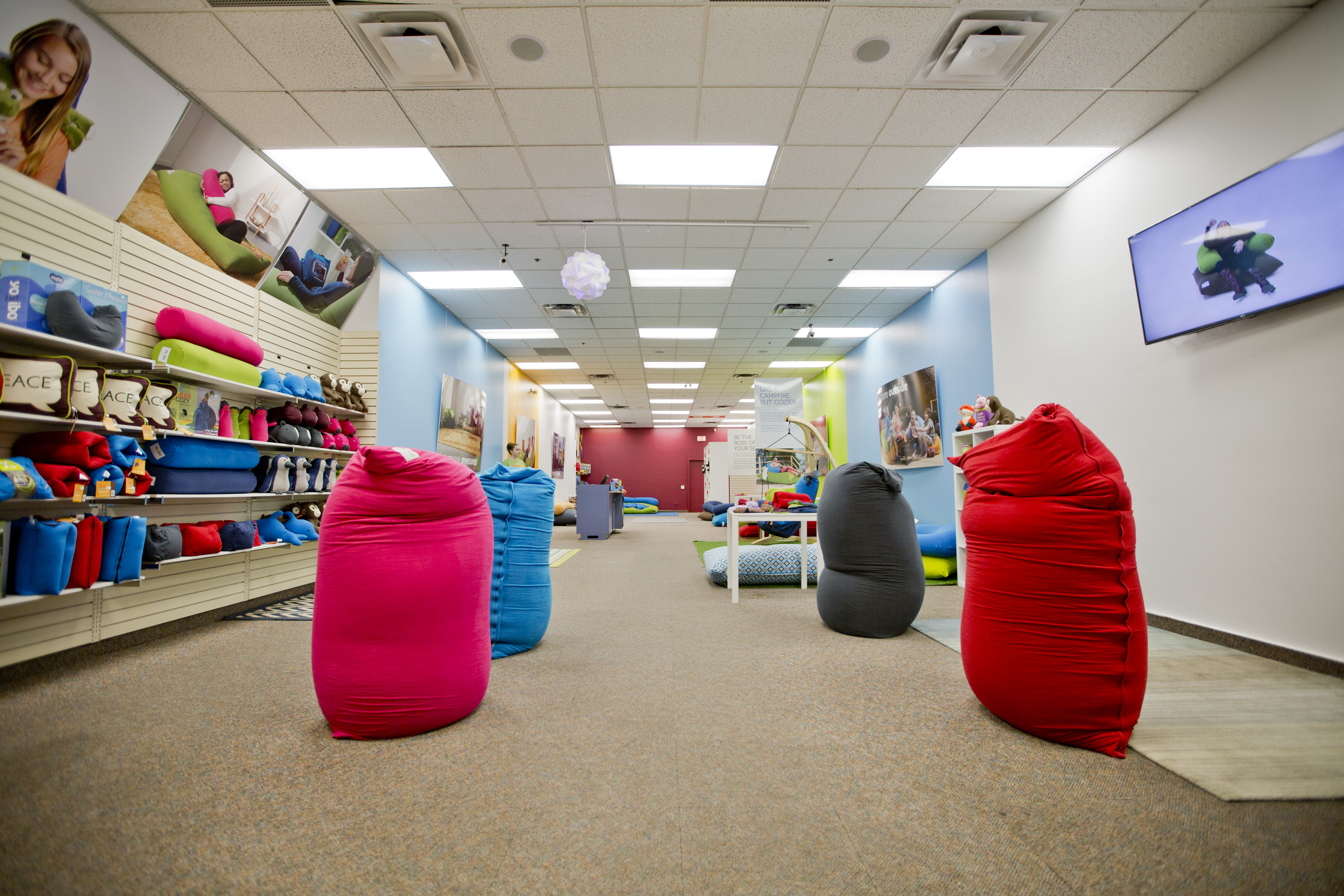
An Yogibo Store in Coquitlam, Canada

In 2019, Yogibo partnered with Lucasfilm and Disney to introduce a Star Wars furniture collection. In November 2020, the company introduced Jogoball, a screen-less interactive game ball. It uses a six-axis motion detection technology and smart audio technology that pairs with a mobile application.

On December 30, 2021, Yogibo LLC was acquired by its Japanese distributor, Webshark. On August 1, 2022, Webshark changed its name to Yogibo Inc.

== Reception ==
Reception to the company's bean bag chairs has been mostly positive. According to The Gadgeteer, the Yogi Max bean bag offered by Yogibo is flexible, allowing the user to "contort the bean bag into all sorts of shapes depending on how [they] want to relax in it." As per The Parent Spot magazine, Yogibo uses foam pellets to fill their bags as opposed to ripped up foam material, leading to a more comfortable experience as the pellets mold around your body.

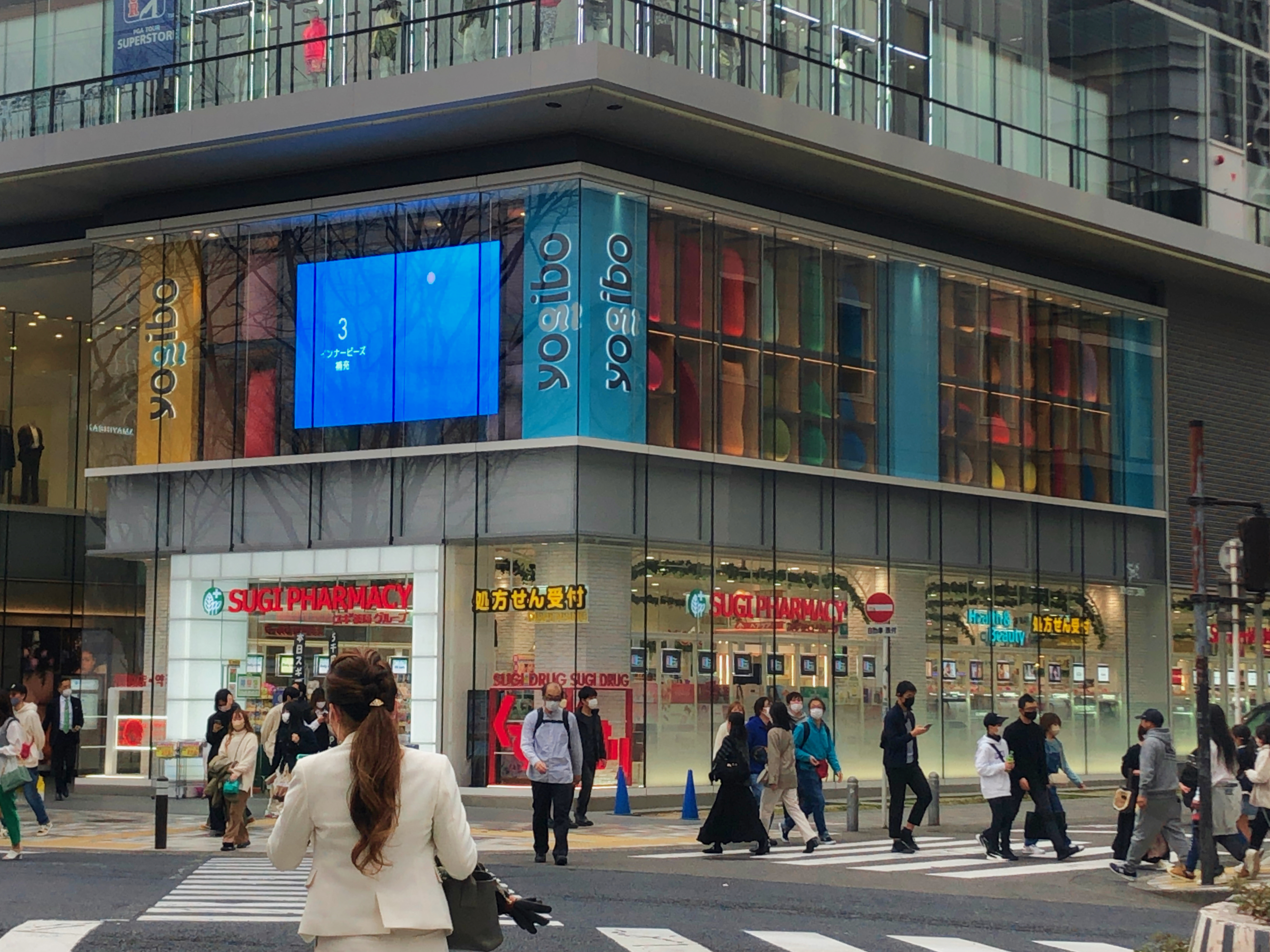
An Yogibo Store in Nagoya Sakae

The company has also received praise for its sensory-inclusive design, with Autism Parenting magazine naming Yogibo bean bag chairs "a must have" for children with autism.

The company's products turn into beds and sofas when used in large sizes. It is also popular with housewives because it is light in weight and easy to carry.

== Dispute ==
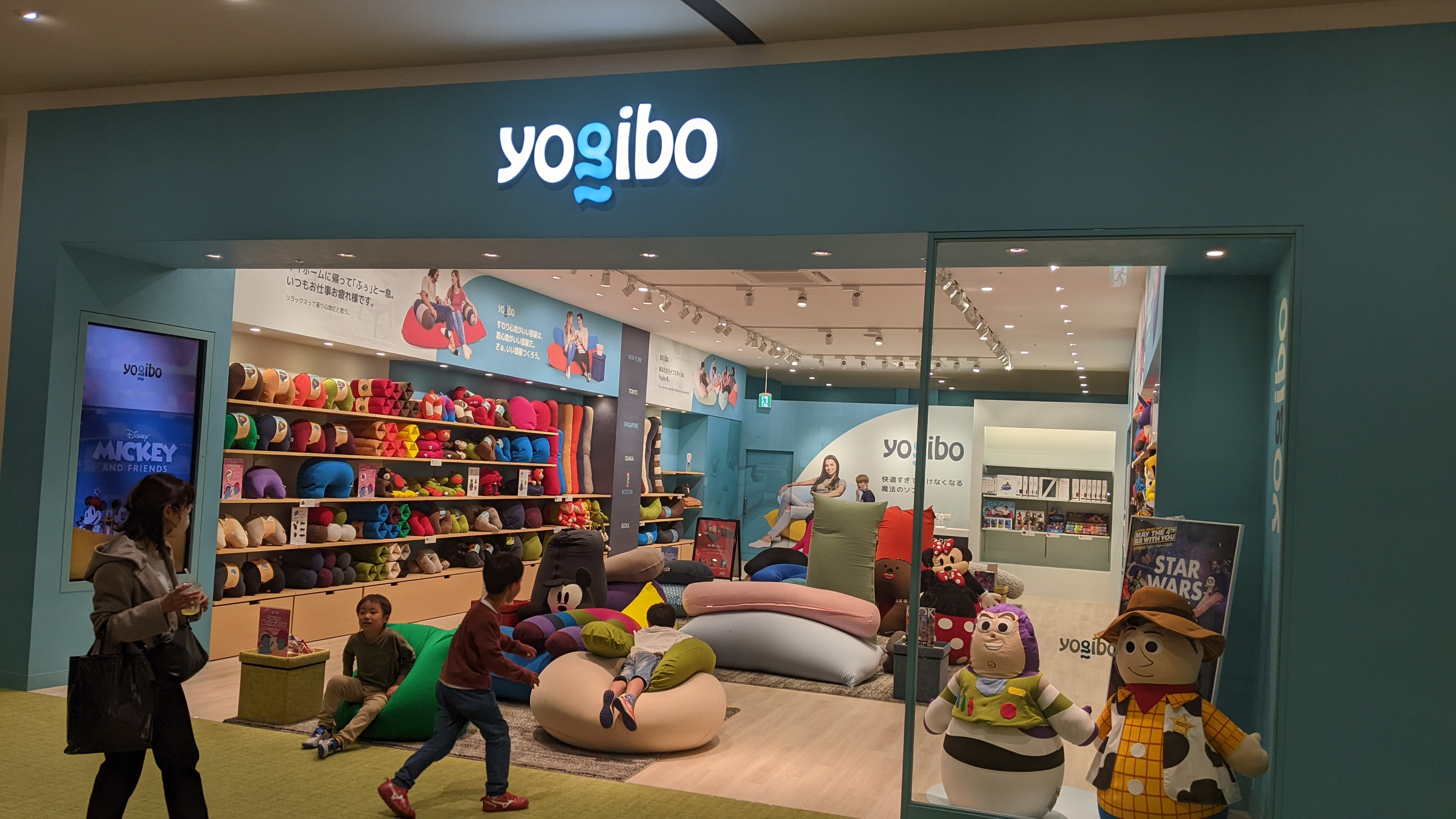
An Yogibo in Lalaport Kadoma

A Kickstarter project for a product called the Moon Pod, started by John Fiorentino, was sent a cease-and-desist letter by Yogibo in November 2019 for using a similar design to Yogibo's patented bean bag chairs. Fiortentino states he never claimed "invention" of the design and that his company was working on a patent.

== Scandals ==
On January 3, 2022, a lawsuit was filed by former employee and whistleblower with the United States District Court for the District of Massachusetts stating that under the direction of CEO Eyal Levy and COO Brett Heppler, between February 2016 and December 2022, Yogibo avoided customs fees by withholding invoices from their customs broker.

As a result, Yogibo must pay $217,832.41 plus interest accruing annually at a rate of 5.25% starting from May, 2023

== Withdrawal from Super GT Racing ==
The Japan Branch of Yogibo Inc, formerly Webshark, participated in Super GT racing. As of February 2024, the company has withdrawn citing "Change in corporate strategy."
