= Haga, Enköping =

Haga
- Location within Uppsala Location within Sweden
- Coordinates: 59°51′N 17°35′E
- Country: Sweden
- Province: Uppland
- County: Uppsala County
- Municipality: Enköping Municipality

Area
  - Total: 0.38 km^{2} (0.15 sq mi)

Population (31 December 2010)
  - Total: 257
  - Density: 681/km^{2} (1,760/sq mi)
- Time zone: UTC+1 (CET)
  - Summer (DST): UTC+2 (CEST)

Haga is a locality situated in Enköping Municipality, Uppsala County, Sweden with 257 inhabitants in 2010. Haga Castle, south of Enköping, is available for conferences, weddings or weekends away.
