= Nesbyen Municipality =

Nesbyen Municipality Nesbyen kommune
- Municipality
- Nes kommune (historic name)
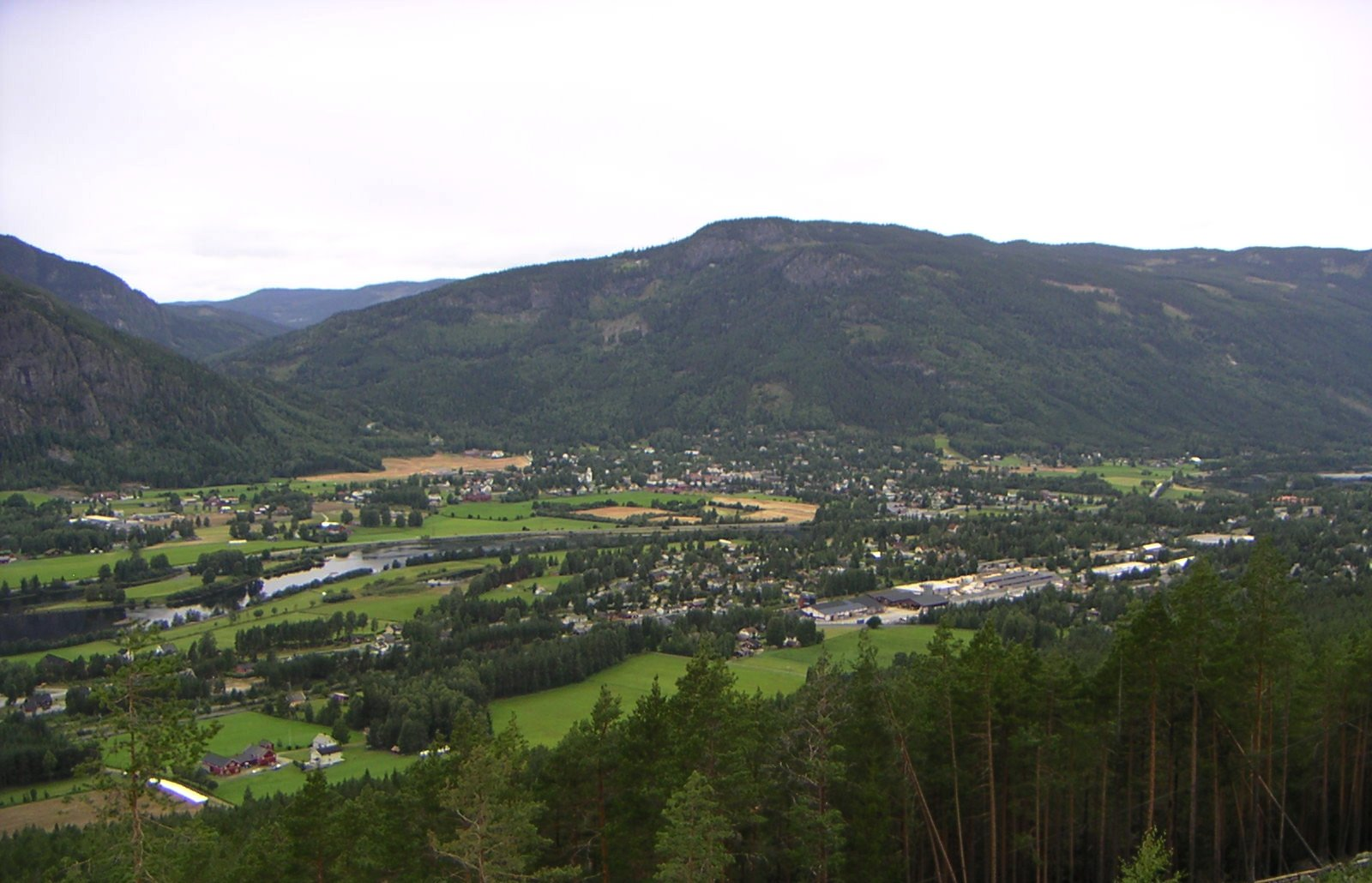
- Administrative centre of Nesbyen

- Coat of arms

- Buskerud within Norway

- Nesbyen within Buskerud
- Coordinates: 60°33′30″N 9°6′4″E
- Country: Norway
- County: Buskerud
- District: Hallingdal
- Administrative centre: Nesbyen

Government
  - Mayor (2015): Tore Haraldset (LL)

Area
  - Total: 810 km^{2} (310 sq mi)
  - Land: 773 km^{2} (298 sq mi)
  - Rank: #135 in Norway

Population (2004)
  - Total: 3,467
  - Rank: #248 in Norway
  - Density: 4/km^{2} (10/sq mi)
  - Change (10 years): ▲ +1.6%
- Demonym: Nesning

Official language
  - Norwegian form: Bokmål
- Time zone: UTC+01:00 (CET)
  - Summer (DST): UTC+02:00 (CEST)
- ISO 3166 code: NO-3322
- Website: Official website

Nesbyen is a municipality in Buskerud county, Norway. It is part of the traditional region of Hallingdal. The administrative centre of the municipality is the village of Nesbyen.

The parish of Næs was established as a municipality on 1 January 1838 (see formannskapsdistrikt). The area of Flå was separated from Nes on 1 January 1905 to become a separate municipality. The name was changed from Nes to Nesbyen in 2020.

== General information ==
=== Name ===
The municipality (originally the parish) is named after the old Nes farm (Old Norse: Nes—now the village of Nesbyen), since the first church was built there. The name is identical with the word nes which means headland. Prior to 1889, the name was spelled "Næs".

=== Coat-of-arms ===
The coat-of-arms is from modern times. They were granted on 29 June 1979. The arms show a yellow-gold triangle pointing to the left on a red background. This represents a sandy peninsula or headlands (yellow triangle) formed by the confluence of two rivers: Rukkedøla and Hallingdalselva. The design is canting because this is what the name of the municipality means (see above under the name).

Number of minorities (1st and 2nd generation) in Nes by country of origin in 2017
Ancestry	Number
Poland	95
Lithuania	36
Eritrea	25
Denmark	18
Netherlands	17

== History ==
Ancient routes went to Vestlandet through Valdres and Hallingdal and down Røldal to Odda. Reflecting this route, Hallingdal and its neighboring valley of Valdres were originally populated by migrants from Vestlandet and spoke a western dialect. In recognition of this, Cardinal Nicholas Breakespear, who was in Scandinavia as papal legate in 1153, included these two valleys in the diocese of Stavanger.

== Geography ==
The municipality lies in the valley and traditional district of Hallingdal. It is bordered on the north by the municipality of Gol Municipality, on the east by Sør-Aurdal Municipality, on the southeast by Flå Municipality, on the southwest by Nore og Uvdal Municipality, and to the west by Ål Municipality.

The majority of the residents live in the villages of Nesbyen, Espeset, Eidal, Sjong, Børtnes, Bromma, Svenkerud, and Liodden.

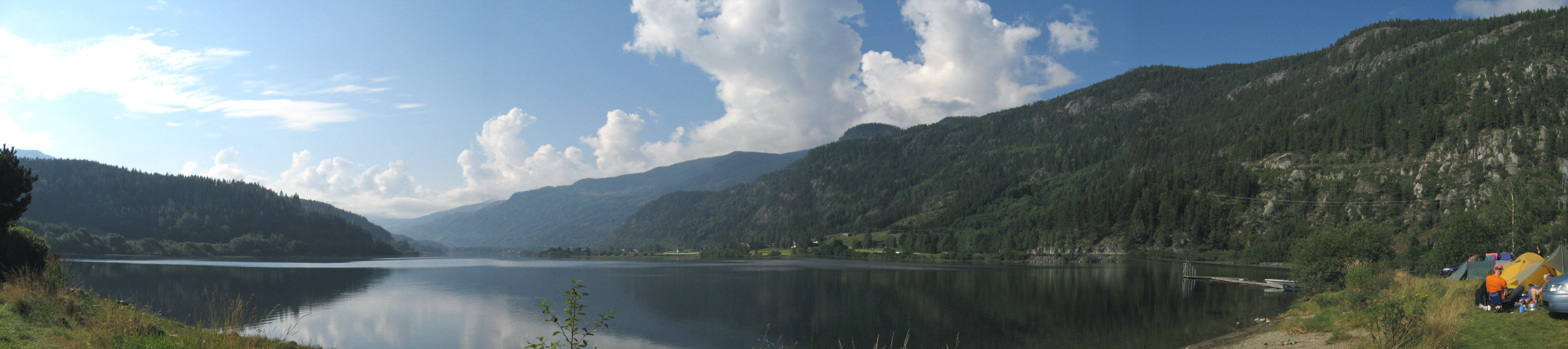
View from Liodden Camping

== Climate ==
Nesbyen has a boreal climate, bordering on a humid continental climate, with fairly warm and pleasant summers and cold winters. On 20 June 1970, Nesbyen recorded the all-time high for Norway 35.6 °C (96.1 °F); the record low −38 °C (−36 °F) was recorded 13 January 1914. The weather station Nesbyen-Todokk started recording in 2003; there have been weather stations in Nesbyen recording temperature since 1897.

Climate data for Nesbyen - Todokk 1991-2020 (166 m, extremes 1897-2020 includes earlier stations, sunhrs from Oslo)
Month	Jan	Feb	Mar	Apr	May	Jun	Jul	Aug	Sep	Oct	Nov	Dec	Year
Record high °C (°F)	13 (55)	14.3 (57.7)	18.9 (66.0)	24.8 (76.6)	30.1 (86.2)	35.6 (96.1)	34.6 (94.3)	34.6 (94.3)	27.8 (82.0)	22 (72)	16 (61)	12.8 (55.0)	35.6 (96.1)
Mean daily maximum °C (°F)	−4 (25)	−0.7 (30.7)	5.8 (42.4)	11.6 (52.9)	16.6 (61.9)	20.9 (69.6)	22.9 (73.2)	20.7 (69.3)	16.2 (61.2)	8.1 (46.6)	1.1 (34.0)	−2.8 (27.0)	9.7 (49.5)
Daily mean °C (°F)	−7.4 (18.7)	−5.8 (21.6)	−0.6 (30.9)	4.4 (39.9)	9.4 (48.9)	13.8 (56.8)	16.1 (61.0)	14.2 (57.6)	9.7 (49.5)	3.1 (37.6)	−2.5 (27.5)	−7.2 (19.0)	3.9 (39.1)
Mean daily minimum °C (°F)	−11.3 (11.7)	−9.6 (14.7)	−5.6 (21.9)	−1.2 (29.8)	3 (37)	7.7 (45.9)	10.4 (50.7)	9.2 (48.6)	5.1 (41.2)	0.1 (32.2)	−4.9 (23.2)	−9.8 (14.4)	−0.6 (30.9)
Record low °C (°F)	−38 (−36)	−37.2 (−35.0)	−29.8 (−21.6)	−19.8 (−3.6)	−8.6 (16.5)	−4.7 (23.5)	0 (32)	−2.1 (28.2)	−6.8 (19.8)	−22 (−8)	−27.4 (−17.3)	−34.5 (−30.1)	−38 (−36)
Average precipitation mm (inches)	31.5 (1.24)	19.5 (0.77)	19.3 (0.76)	24.7 (0.97)	42.7 (1.68)	59.3 (2.33)	75.7 (2.98)	72 (2.8)	48.9 (1.93)	45.5 (1.79)	39.1 (1.54)	30.5 (1.20)	508.7 (19.99)
Mean monthly sunshine hours	45.1	77.6	146.5	182.0	248.0	230.3	244.1	203.8	150.1	94	50.9	40.0	1,712.4
Source 1: yr.no (mean, precipitation)
Source 2: Meteostat (avg high/low temperature)

== Attractions ==
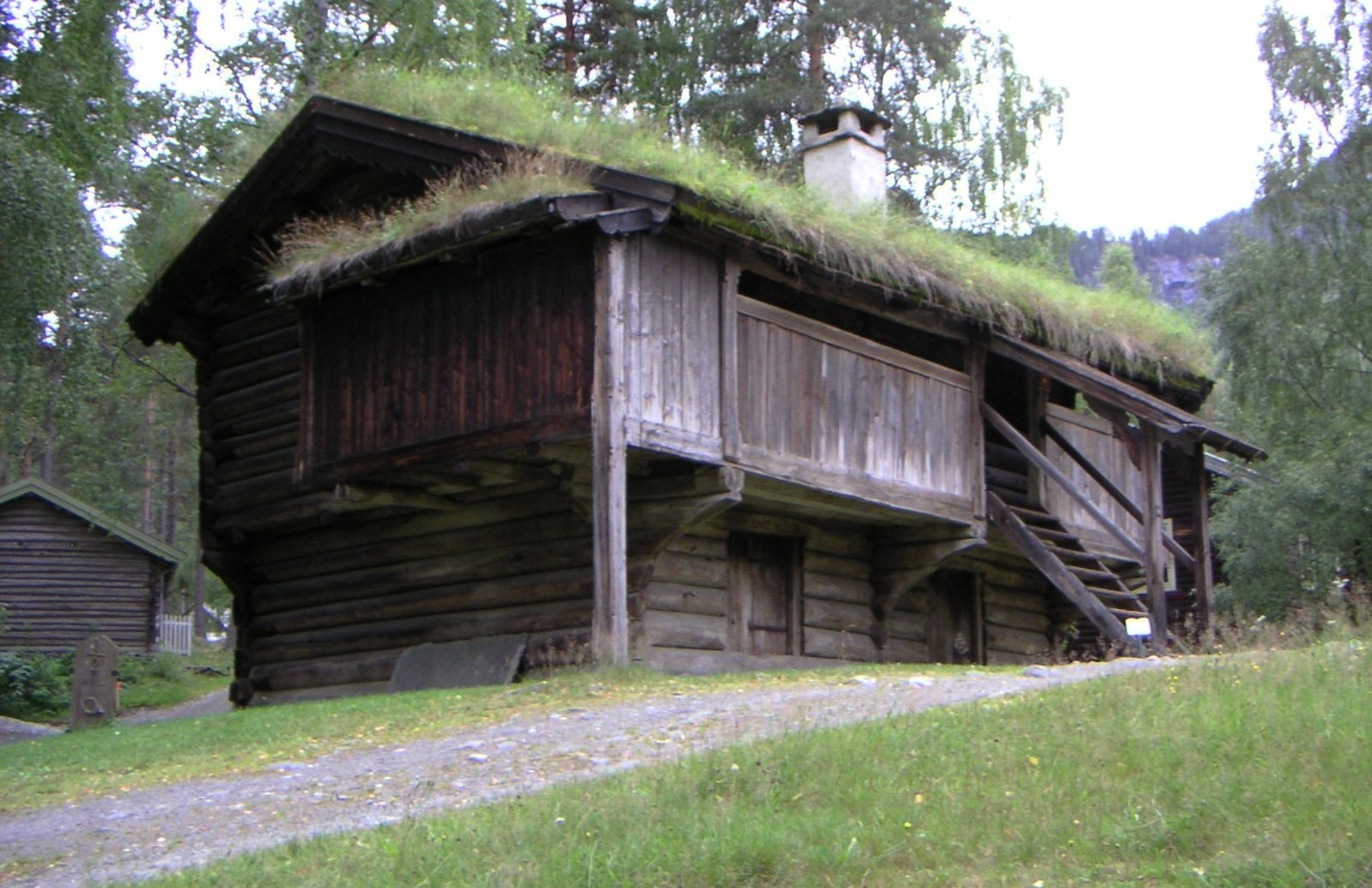
Trøymstugua from 1645

Hallingdal Museum (Hallingdal Folkemuseum) is located in Nesbyen. Hallingdal Folk Museum, founded in 1899, is one of the oldest open air museums in Norway. It has a large and unique collection of buildings and artifacts from farms in Hallingdal. Special mentions is houses like Staveloftet, built around 1340, from the Stave farm and Trøymstua from about 1645, coming from Hemsedal Municipality.

There is an old meteor crater just north of Nesbyen (about 6 kilometres north and then 4 kilometres into the woods). About 650 million years ago, a 200-to-300-metre (660 to 980 ft) meteorite struck this area. This resulted in a 5-kilometre (3.1 mi) impact crater and an enormous amount of outpouring of energy by the impact.

== Notable residents ==
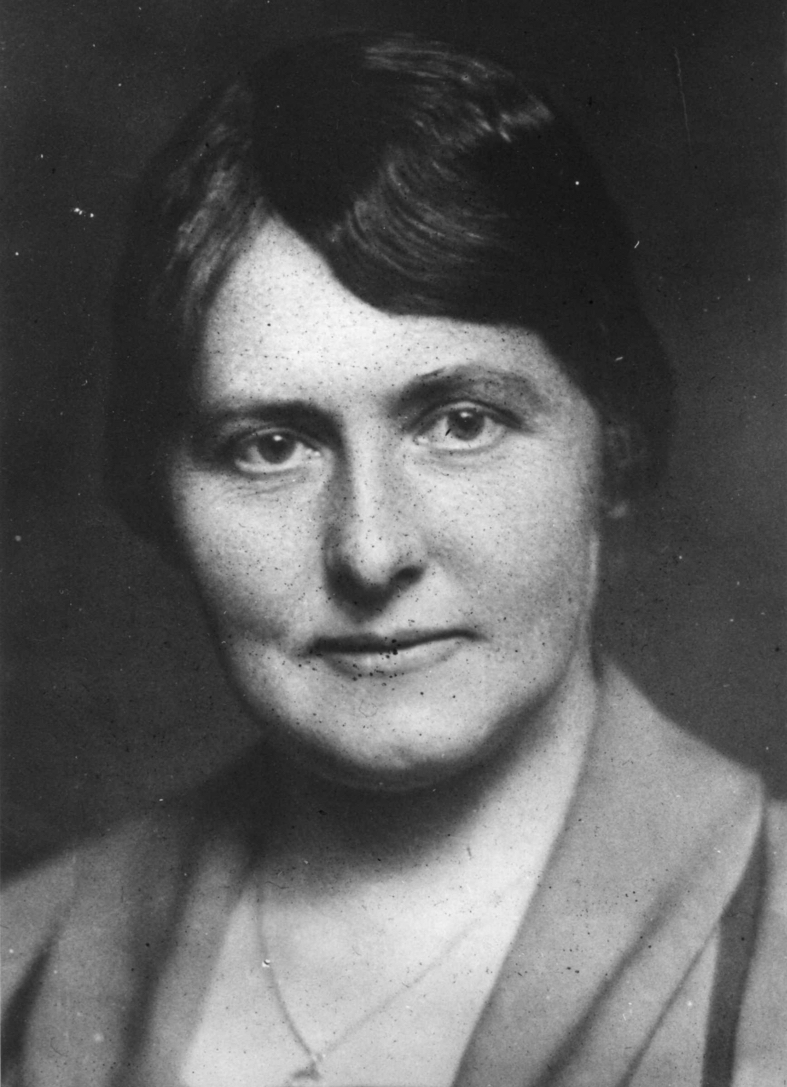
Margarete Bonnevie

- Hans Gude (1825-1903) painter, mainstay of Norwegian romantic nationalism
- Eilif Peterssen (1852-1928) a Norwegian painter of landscapes and portraits
- Marcelius Haga (1882–1968) Mayor from 1919 to 1934 and during the war
- Margarete Bonnevie (1884—1970) a Norwegian author, feminist and politician
- Olaf Øen (1925-2009) politician, Mayor of Nes 1963-1977
- Odd Bakkerud (1931–1989) a Norwegian fiddle player
- Lars Roar Langslet (1936–2016) politician, Minister of Education and Church Affairs
- Kristin Hille Valla (born 1944) teacher, school director and politician
- Pål Gunnar Mikkelsplass (born 1961) a cross-country skier, silver medallist at the 1988 Winter Olympics

== See also ==
- Nesbyen IL
