= Haga trädgård =

Swedish national museum

- Established: 1785 (as garden); 1989 (as tourist attraction)
- Location: Haga Park in Solna, Sweden
- Coordinates: 59°21′58.26″N 18°1′51.99″E

Haga Trädgård is a garden located at the northern end of Haga Park in Solna, Sweden.

Haga Trädgård was founded by King Gustav III in the 1785. It was intended that it should become the kitchen garden to the royal household. At the time Gustav III had plans to build a very large palace just 300m from Haga Trädgård but eventually due to lack of available finance the palace was never built. The Haga Tradgard gardens were indeed established and provided the royal household with many different local and exotic vegetables and fruits. In 1812 the King purchased 20 figs from the gardens at a cost of 2 kronor each. At the time a garden employee earned just 7.5 öre per hour. The gardens flourished and became a well known source for flowers and vegetables.

In 1917 the department store NK took over the gardens to grow fresh vegetables for Stockholm's inhabitants. It was at the tail end of the first World War and fresh vegetables were quite scarce. In 1917, NK built a splendid conservatory which now is Stockholms oldest conservatory. In 1933 the town council of Stockholm took over the gardens and produced flowers for official use and for embellishment of squares and gardens.

In 1989 Stephen Fried and Marie Fried opened the Fjärilshuset ("Butterfly House") in Haga Gardens which once again turned the area into a visitor attraction. The butterfly house was so successful that Stephen Fried and Marie Fried bought all of the buildings from the town council with the Royal Swedish Land Agency retaining the land.

Nowadays Fjärilshuset is a national museum with the buildings being held privately and the land leased by Fjarilshuset Haga Tradgard AB. Haga Tradgard is successively being restored so that it mirrors its historical continuity.

== Gallery ==
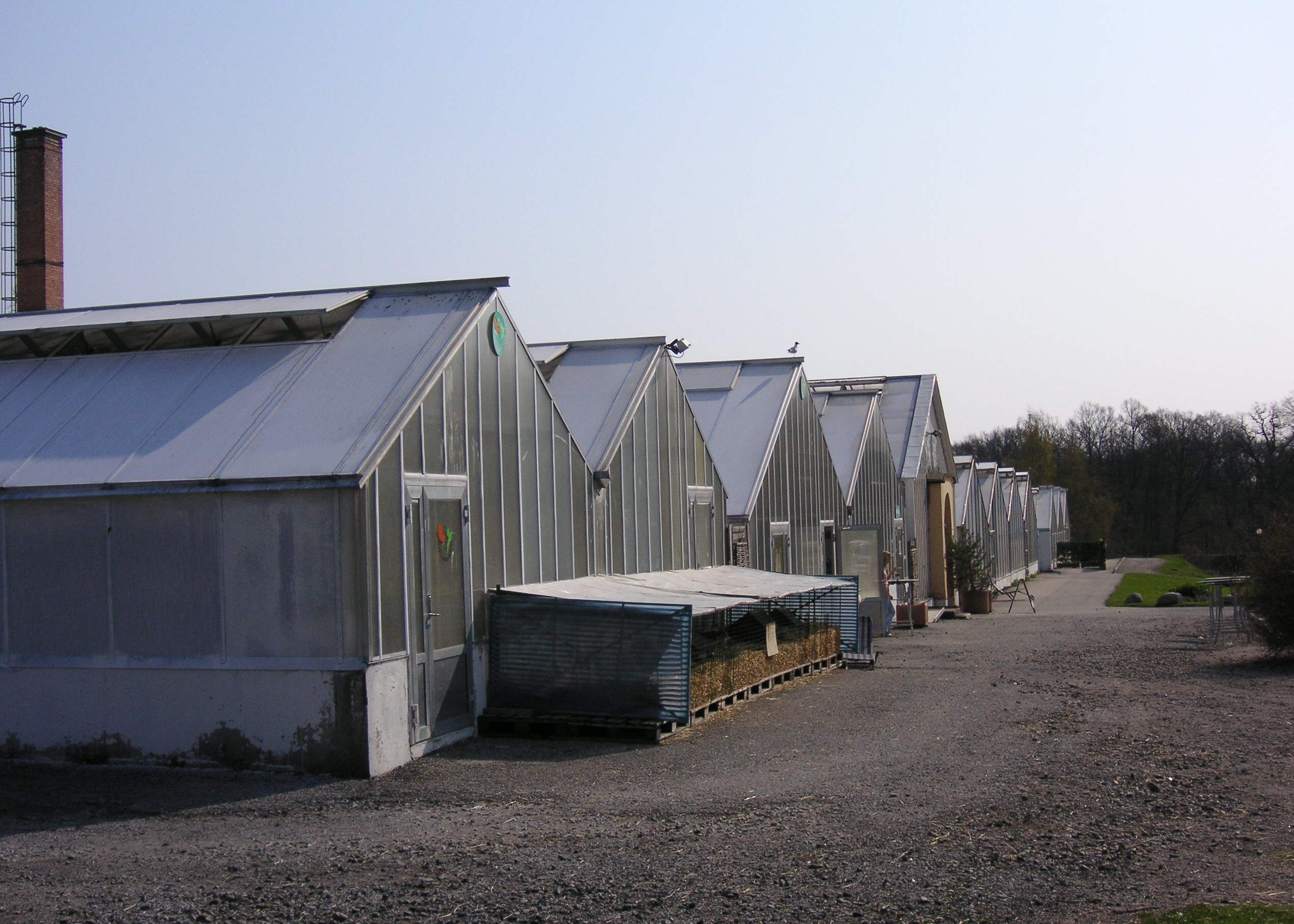
Greenhouses May 2006

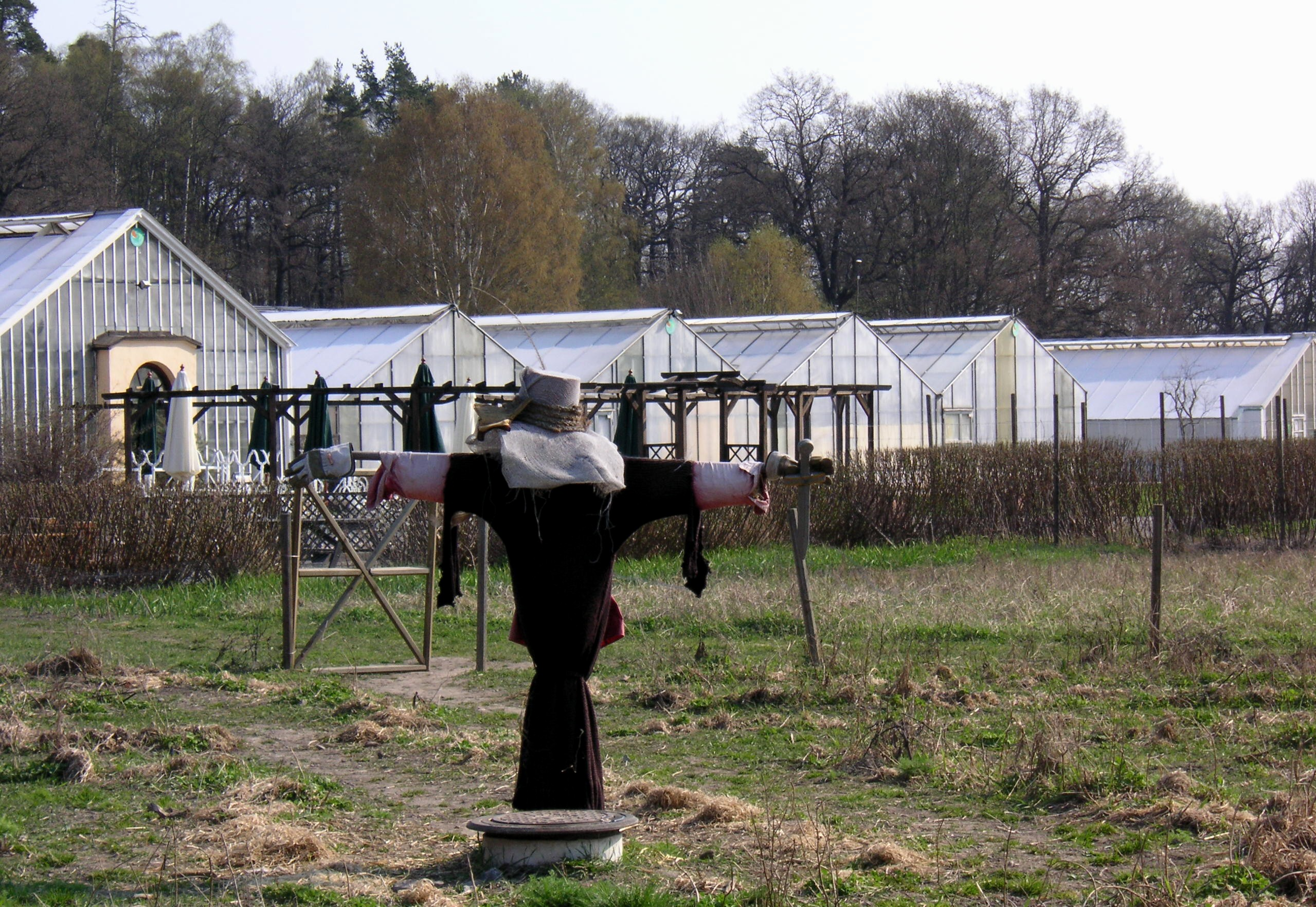
Greenhouses May 2006

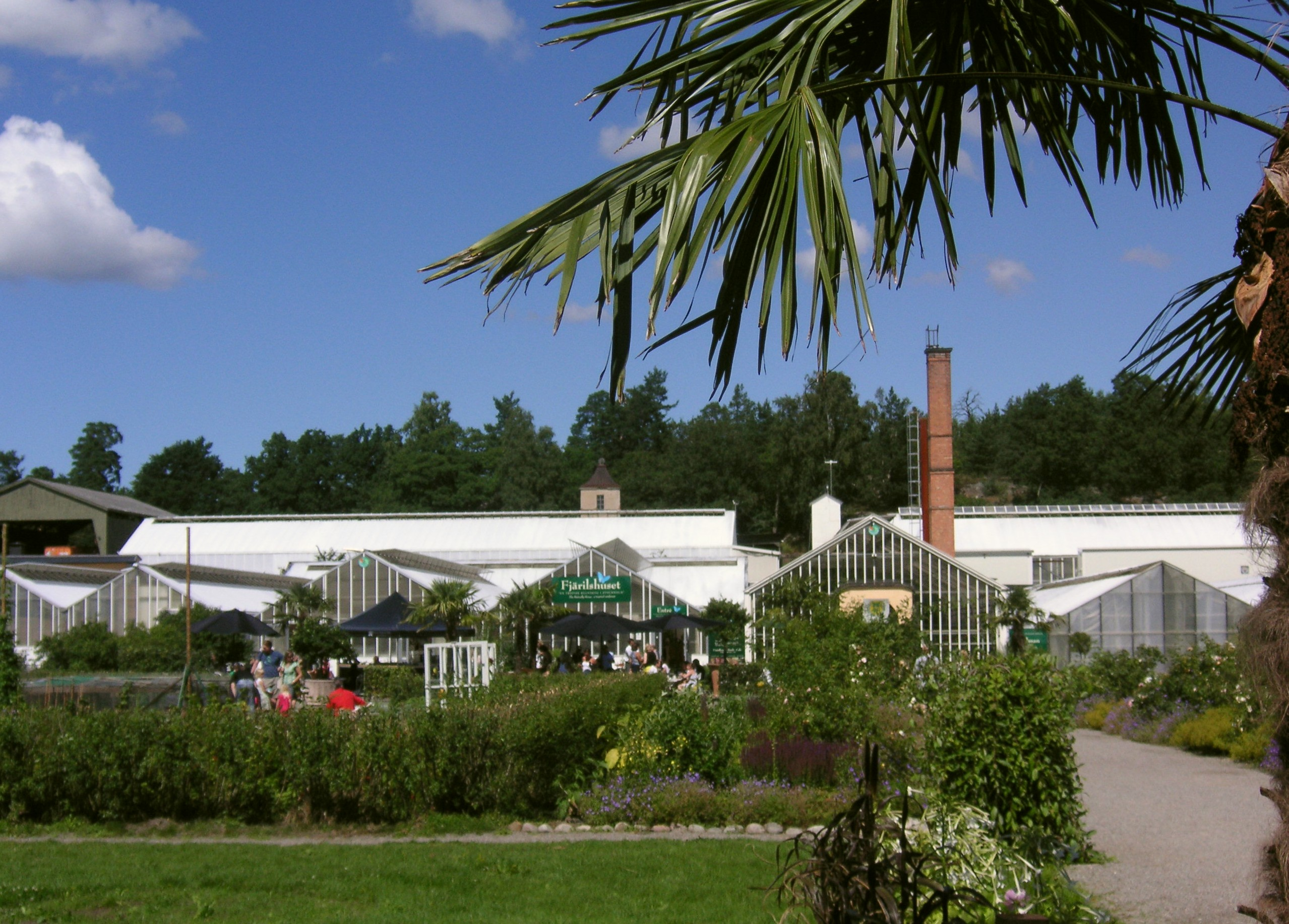
Butterfly House July 2007

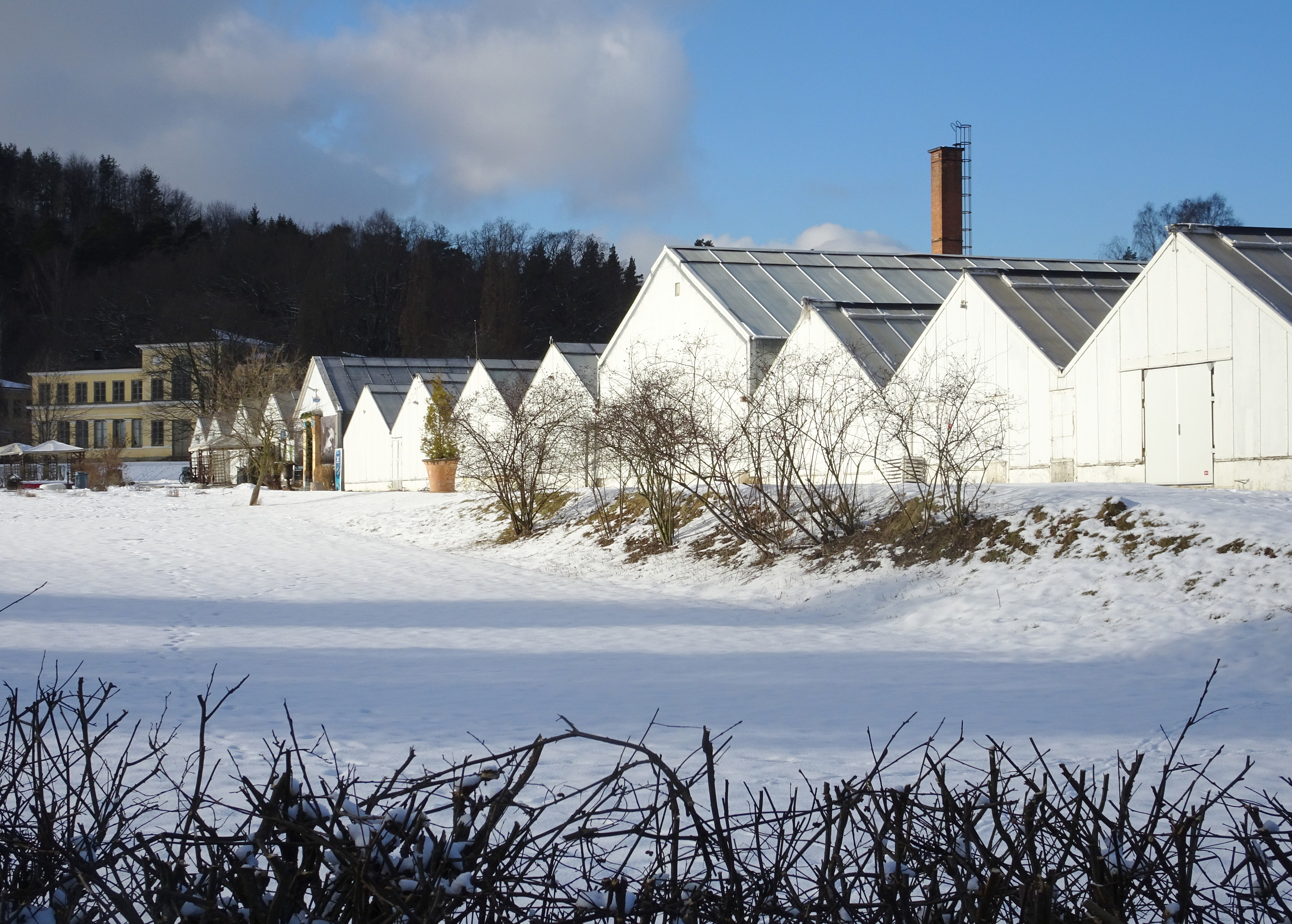
Greenhuoses February 2018
