= Peter Olaf Debes =

Norwegian politician

Peter Olaf Debes (1845–1914) was a Norwegian politician.

He was elected to the Norwegian Parliament in 1883, 1886, 1889, 1892 and 1895. He represented the constituency of Kragerø, except for the last term when he represented Larvik og Sandefjord. He worked as a surveyor of customs and excise.

Together with Bertha Matina Thomesen (1853–1924) he had the daughter Caroline Juliane (1877–1944), who married Paal Berg.
