= May-Britt Hägg =

Norwegian chemical engineer

May-Britt Hägg is a Norwegian chemical engineer known for her work on membrane gas separation for separating carbon dioxide from other materials, which has been applied to reduce carbon emissions from cement production and coal-fired power stations, improve the quality of biogas, and retain more flavor and aroma producing compounds in winemaking.

Hägg is a professor emerita at the Norwegian University of Science and Technology (NTNU), and a member of the Norwegian Academy of Science and Letters. She was the 2017 recipient of the SINTEF/NTNU CCS Award for outstanding achievements within the field of carbon capture, transport and storage (CCS).
