= Hans Jensen Haga =

Norwegian politician

Hans Jensen Haga (6 December 1845 – 12 October 1924) was a Norwegian politician for the Conservative Party.

He was elected to the Norwegian Parliament in 1889, representing Akershus Amt. He was re-elected on four consecutive occasions. He worked as a farmer.
