= Mexico at the 1932 Summer Olympics =

- IOC code: MEX
- NOC: Mexican Olympic Committee

in Los Angeles
- Competitors: 73 (71 men, 2 women) in 12 sports
- Flag bearer: Eugenia Escudero
- Medals Ranked 21st: Gold 0 Silver 2 Bronze 0 Total 2

Summer Olympics appearances (overview)
- 1900; 1904–1920; 1924; 1928; 1932; 1936; 1948; 1952; 1956; 1960; 1964; 1968; 1972; 1976; 1980; 1984; 1988; 1992; 1996; 2000; 2004; 2008; 2012; 2016; 2020; 2024

Mexico competed at the 1932 Summer Olympics in Los Angeles, United States. 73 competitors, 71 men and 2 women, took part in 52 events in 12 sports.

== Medalists ==
Medal	Name	Sport	Event	Date
Silver	Francisco Cabañas	Boxing	Flyweight	13 August
Silver	Gustavo Huet	Shooting	Men's 50 metre rifle prone	13 August

== Athletics ==
Key

- Note–Ranks given for track events are within the athlete's heat only
- Q = Qualified for the next round
- q = Qualified for the next round as a fastest loser or, in field events, by position without achieving the qualifying target
- NR = National record
- N/A = Round not applicable for the event
- Bye = Athlete not required to compete in round

Track & road events
Men

Athlete	Event	Heat		Quarterfinal		Semifinal		Final	
Athlete	Event	Result	Rank	Result	Rank	Result	Rank	Result	Rank
Fernando Ortiz	100 m	11.2	3Q	11.0	5	Did not advance			
Jesús Moraila	100 m	11.2	4	Did not advance					
Fernando Ramírez	100 m	11.4	4	Did not advance					
Enrique Sánchez	200 m	22.8	4	Did not advance					
Everardo Múzquiz	200 m	23.0	5	Did not advance					
Fernando Ramírez	200 m	Did not start		Did not advance					
Carlos de Anda	400 m	49.8	4	Did not advance					
Manuel Álvarez	400 m	49.9	6	Did not advance					
Ricardo Argüello	400 m	50.9	4	Did not advance					
José Lucílo Iturbe	800 m	1:55.6	7	—N/a				Did not advance	
Miguel Vasconcelos	800 m	2:00.0	7	—N/a				Did not advance	
Amilio Rodríguez	800 m	Did not start		Did not advance					
Amilio Rodríguez	1500 m	Unknown	7	—N/a				Did not advance	
Pedro Ortíz	1500 m	4:18.0	7	—N/a				Did not advance	
Jaime Merino	1500 m	Did not start		—N/a				Did not advance	
Valentín González	5000 m	Did not finish	10	—N/a				Did not advance	
Juan Morales	5000 m	16:00.0	8	—N/a				Did not advance	
Juan Morales	10,000 m	—N/a						32:03.0	7
Valentín González	10,000 m	—N/a						Did not start	
Federico Gamboa	110 m hurdles	15.4	6	—N/a		Did not advance			
Roberto Sánchez	110 m hurdles	15.7	4	—N/a		Did not advance			
Alfonso González	400 m hurdles	56.7	5	—N/a				Did not advance	
Jesús Moraila; Everardo Múzquiz; Fernando Ortiz; Fernando Ramírez; Enrique Sánchez	4 x 100 metres relay	Did not start		—N/a				Did not advance	
Ricardo Argüello; Jesús Moraila; Manuel Álvarez; Carlos de Anda	4 x 400 metres relay	3:28.5	4	—N/a				Did not advance	
Margarito Pomposo	Marathon	—N/a						3:10:51	20
Santiago Hernández	Marathon	—N/a						Did not start	

Field events
Men

Athlete	Event	Qualification		Final	
Athlete	Event	Distance	Position	Distance	Position
Esteban Crespo	Men's long jump	—N/a		5.83	10
Salvador Alanís	Men's triple jump	—N/a		13.28	15
Jesús Aguirre	Men's shot put	—N/a		Did not start	
Jesús Aguirre	Men's discus throw	—N/a		Did not start	
Francisco Robledo	Men's discus throw	—N/a		Did not start	
Adolfo Clouthier	Men's javelin throw	—N/a		46.38	12
Miguel Camberos	Men's javelin throw	—N/a		41.71	13
Francisco Robledo	Men's hammer throw	—N/a		41.61	11

Women

Athlete	Event	Qualification		Final	
Athlete	Event	Distance	Position	Distance	Position
María Uribe	Women's javelin throw	—N/a		33.66	7

== Boxing ==
Athlete	Event	Round of 16	Quarterfinals	Semifinals	Final	
Athlete	Event	Opposition Result	Opposition Result	Opposition Result	Opposition Result	Rank
Francisco Cabañas	Flyweight	Bye	Duke (RSA); W	Pardoe (GBR); W	Énekes (HUN); L	2nd place, silver medalist(s)
Sabino Tirado	Bantamweight	Lang (USA); L	Did not advance			9
Miguel Araico	Featherweight	Hines (USA); L	Did not advance			9
Manuel Ponce	Lightweight	Mayor (FRA); L	Did not advance			8
Al Romero	Welterweight	McCleave (GBR); DIS	Did not advance			9
Manuel Cruz	Middleweight	Bye	Barth (USA); L	Did not advance		5

== Cycling ==
=== Road ===
Athlete	Event	Time	Rank
Manuel Díaz	Individual Road race	3:01:08.2	33
Ernesto Grobet	1000 m time trial	1:25.2	9

=== Track ===
Sprint

Athlete	Event	Heats		Repechage		Quarterfinals	Semifinals	Final	
Athlete	Event	Time	Rank	Time	Rank	Opposition Time Speed (km/h)	Opposition Time Speed (km/h)	Opposition Time Speed (km/h)	Rank
Enrique Heredia	Sprint		3		3	Did not advance			

== Diving ==
Athlete	Event	Final	
Athlete	Event	Points	Rank
Federico Mariscal	3 m springboard	111.98	10
Antonio Mariscal	3 m springboard	97.28	12
Alonso Mariscal	3 m springboard	88.32	13
Carlos Curiel	10 m platform	83.82	5
Jesús Flores	10 m platform	77.94	6

== Equestrian ==
=== Dressage ===
Athlete	Horse	Event	Score	Rank
Gabriel Gracida	El Paso	Individual	601.50	9

=== Eventing ===
Athlete	Horse	Event	Dressage		Cross-country			Jumping		Total	
Athlete	Horse	Event	Points	Rank	Points	Total	Rank	Points	Rank	Points	Rank
José Pérez Allende	El Torero	Individual	171.167	13	Eliminated			Did not advance			
Armando Barriguete	Monza	Individual	119.167	14	Did not start			Did not advance			

=== Jumping ===
The team event was declared void as no nation completed the course with three riders.

Athlete	Horse	Event	Penalties	Rank
Andrés Bocanegra	El As	Individual	Did not finish	
Carlos Mejia	Kanguro	Individual	Did not finish	
Procopio Ortíz	Pinello	Individual	Did not finish	

== Fencing ==
Men

Athlete	Event	Round 1			Semifinals			Final		
Athlete	Event	MW	ML	Rank	MW	ML	Rank	MW	ML	Rank
Leobardo Candiani	Men's foil	0	6	7	Did not advance					
Eduardo Prieto	Men's foil	2	6	7	Did not advance					
Raymundo Izcoa	Men's foil	2	6	8	Did not advance					
Raymundo Izcoa; Leobardo Candiani; Eduardo Prieto; Jesús Sánchez	Men's team foil	0	2	3	—N/a			Did not advance		
Gerónimo Delgadillo; Eduardo Prieto Souza; Eduardo Prieto; Francisco Valero	Men's team épée	Bye			0	2	3	Did not advance		
Gerónimo Delgadillo	Men's sabre	1	5	7	Did not advance					
Francisco Valero	Men's sabre	2	5	6Q	2	6	9	Did not advance		
Antonio Haro	Men's sabre	5	3	3Q	1	5	8	Did not advance		
Antonio Haro; Francisco Valero; Gerónimo Delgadillo; Francisco Valero	Men's team sabre	0	2	4	—N/a			Did not advance		

Athlete	Event	Round 1		Semifinals		Final	
Athlete	Event	Points	Rank	Points	Rank	Points	Rank
Eduardo Prieto	Individual épée	7	6 Q	4	8	Did not advance	
Gerónimo Delgadillo	Individual épée	4	10	Did not advance			
Eduardo Prieto Souza	Individual épée	4	11	Did not advance			

Women

Athlete	Event	Round 1			Semifinals			Final		
Athlete	Event	MW	ML	Rank	MW	ML	Rank	MW	ML	Rank
Eugenia Escudero	Women's foil	0	6	9	Did not advance					

== Gymnastics ==
Apparatus and all-around events received separate scores.

Athlete	Event	Final						
Athlete	Event	Apparatus					Total	Rank
Athlete	Event	PH	R	V	PB	HB	Total	Rank
Ismael Mosqueira	Horizontal bar	—N/a					32.8	9
Vicente Mayagoitia	Parallel bars	—N/a					44.9	13
Francisco José Álvarez	Parallel bars	—N/a					41.2	15
Ismael Mosqueira	Pommel horse	—N/a					41.8	10
Vicente Mayagoitia	Parallel bars	—N/a					50.9	9
Francisco José Álvarez	Parallel bars	—N/a					48.4	11

=== Indian clubs ===
Athlete	Event	Points	Rank
Francisco José Álvarez	Indian clubs	25.4	4

== Modern pentathlon ==
Athlete	Fencing (épée one touch)		Swimming (300 m freestyle)		Riding (cross-country)			Shooting (10 m air pistol)		Running (4000 m)		Total points	Final rank
Athlete	Results (W–D–L)	Rank	Time	Rank	Penalties	Time	Rank	Points	Rank	Time	Rank	Total points	Final rank
Humberto Anguiano	Did not finish												
José Morales	9–?–?	24	7:21.9	22	18	13:16.0	17	162	22	22:56.6	24	109.0	24
Miguel Ortega	16–?–?	=20	Did not finish		18	13:16.0	17	188	8	18:33.4	19	95.0	21

== Shooting ==
Athlete	Event	Round 1		Round 2		Round 3		Round 4		Round 5		Final	
Athlete	Event	Points	Rank	Points	Rank	Points	Rank	Points	Rank	Points	Rank	Points	Rank
Arnulfo Hernández	25 m rapid fire pistol	18	12	6	7	5	7	Did not advance					
Gustavo Salinas	25 m rapid fire pistol	18	12	6	7	5	7	Did not advance					
Arturo Villanueva	25 m rapid fire pistol	18	12	6	7	6	4	5	4	Did not advance			
Carlos Guerrero	50 m rifle, prone	—N/a										290	10
Gustavo Huet	50 m rifle, prone	—N/a										294	2nd place, silver medalist(s)
Gustavo Salinas	50 m rifle, prone	—N/a										289	=11

== Swimming ==
Athlete	Event	Heat		Semifinal		Final	
Athlete	Event	Time	Rank	Time	Rank	Time	Rank
Ignacio Gutiérrez	400 m freestyle	5:29.1	4	Did not advance			
Manuel Villegas	400 m freestyle	5:54.2	5	Did not advance			
Ignacio Gutiérrez	1500 m freestyle	22:39.2	4	Did not advance			
Manuel Villegas	1500 m freestyle	23:40.0	4	Did not advance			
Pablo Zierold	200 m breaststroke	3:15.2	5	Did not advance			

== Wrestling ==
Key:

- F - Fall.
- D - Decision

Freestyle

Wrestlers who accumulated 5 "bad points" were eliminated. Points were given as follows: 1 point for victories short of a fall and 3 points for every loss.

Athlete	Event	Round 1	Round 2	Round 3	Round 4	Final	Points	Rank
Athlete	Event	Opposition Result	Opposition Result	Opposition Result	Opposition Result	Opposition Result	Points	Rank
Fidel Arellano	–61 kg	Chasson (FRA); L ^{F}	Taylor (GBR); L ^{F}	Did not advance				
Raúl López	–72 kg	Bebber (USA); L ^{F}	Did not advance					

== Art competitions ==
Art competitions were part of the Olympic program from 1912 to 1948, but were discontinued due to concerns about amateurism and professionalism. Some artists took part, but the exact event is unknown

Competitor	Event	Title	Rank
José Orozco	Unknown	Athlete Resting	Unknown
Ángel Zárraga	Unknown	Three Soccer Players	Unknown
