= Philippines at the 1932 Summer Olympics =

- Flag of the Philippines
- IOC code: PHI
- NOC: Philippine Amateur Athletic Federation

in Los Angeles
- Competitors: 8 in 3 sports
- Medals Ranked 25th: Gold 0 Silver 0 Bronze 3 Total 3

Summer Olympics appearances (overview)
- 1924; 1928; 1932; 1936; 1948; 1952; 1956; 1960; 1964; 1968; 1972; 1976; 1980; 1984; 1988; 1992; 1996; 2000; 2004; 2008; 2012; 2016; 2020; 2024

The Philippines, also known as the Philippine Islands, competed at the 1932 Summer Olympics in Los Angeles, United States, which was held from July 30 to August 24. This appearance marked the third appearance of the nation. Until the 2020 Summer Olympics, this was the first and only game where Filipinos won more than one medal and also earned its highest medal haul.

The delegation consisted of nine people: Foreign Consultant Rudolph Mueller, and six Olympians: high jumper Simeon Toribio, boxers John Gray, José Villanueva, José Padilla Jr., and Carlos Padilla Sr., and swimmers Abdurahman Ali, Teófilo Yldefonso, and Jikirum Adjaluddin. There were also two coaches.

Three people won a bronze medal: Simon Toribio as part of the Men's high jump category in Athletics, José Villanueva as part of the Men's bantamweight category in Boxing, and Teófilo Yldefonso as part of the Men's 200-meter breaststroke in Swimming.

== Medalists ==
Medal	Name	Sport	Event	Date
Bronze	Simeon Toribio	Athletics	Men's high jump	July 31
Bronze	José Villanueva	Boxing	Men's bantamweight	August 11
Bronze	Teófilo Yldefonso	Swimming	Men's 200 m breaststroke	August 13

== Background ==
The Games were held from July 30 to August 14, 1932, in Los Angeles, California. This edition marked the nation's third appearance to the Summer Olympic Games since their second appearance at the 1928 Summer Olympics, which was held in Amsterdam, Netherlands. This appearance also marked the third since their first appearance at the 1924 Summer Olympics.

=== Qualification and delegation ===
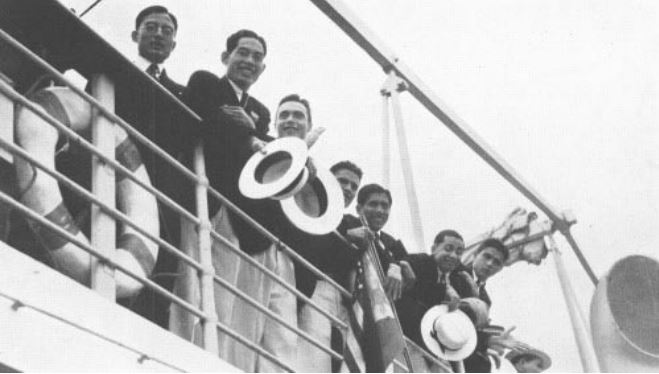
The Philippine delegation riding a boat to Los Angeles.

The delegation was organized by the Philippine Amateur Athletic Federation, after the organization's recognition as the National Olympic Committee in 1929. The participation was accepted after a meeting, deciding on a system where they would pick 50 participants. (Note: Some sources estimate that the PAAF picked 60 participants.) The practice was conducted throughout the country, with an elimination system. Each province had an athletic commissioner, who is responsible for picking athletes for the competition.

The foreign consultant of the team was picked to be Rudolph Mueller. Joaquin Elizalde, a member of the delegation, was picked to be a jury participant, specifically for athletics. The team consisted of high jumper Simeon Toribio, boxers John Gray, José Villanueva, José Padilla Jr., (Note: Enlisted as "José Padilla".) and Carlos Padilla Sr., (Note: Enlisted as "Carlos Padilla".) and swimmers Abdurahman Ali, Teófilo Yldefonso, and Jikirum Adjaluddin. An additional two coaches were present. The team calculated to approximately nine people, who were transported on the Tatsuta Maru ship. The delegation was one of the first to arrive.

=== Opening ceremony ===
The Philippines was the 28th out of 37 countries which participated in the opening ceremony. The Philippines didn't have a flag bearer.

== Athletics ==
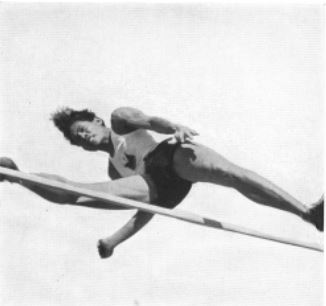
Simeon Toribio jumping in the Men's high jump category.

The athletic events were held at the Los Angeles Memorial Coliseum. Toribio first competed in the qualifying round on July 31. Then, he ended up with a bronze medal after jumping to a height of 1.97 meters, tied with four other athletes.

Field events

Athlete	Event	Final	
Athlete	Event	Distance	Position
Simeon Toribio	High jump	1.97	3rd place, bronze medalist(s)

== Boxing ==
The boxing events were held at the Grand Olympic Auditorium. Gray participated in the Flyweight classification. In the first round, he fought Edelweis Rodriguez from the Italian delegation on August 9. After a decision, he lost, gaining 9th place, the last place. He tied with four other people. The same day, Villanueva fought in the Bantamweight category. He won in round one, without a competitor. The next day, in the quarterfinals, he fought Akira Nakao of the Japanese delegation. After a decision, he won. He went to the semi-finals, fighting Lefty Gwynne of the Canadian delegation on August 11. He won, fighting against Joseph Lang of the American delegation on August 13. He lost, but he won third place.

On August 9, Padilla (Note: Specifically Jose Padilla.) participated in the Lightweight classification. After competing against Laurie Stevens from the South African delegation, he lost. He gained 8th place, the last place, tied with six other people. The same day, Padilla (Note: Specifically Carlos Padilla) fought against Lucien Laplace of the French delegation in round one, losing after a decision. He gained 9th place, the last place, tied with eight other people.

Athlete	Event	Round of 16	Quarterfinals	Semifinals	Final	
Athlete	Event	Opposition Result	Opposition Result	Opposition Result	Opposition Result	Rank
John Gray	Flyweight	Rodriguez (ITA); L	Did not advance			
José Villanueva	Bantamweight	—	Nakao (JPN); W	Gwynne (CAN); L	Lang (USA); W w/o	3rd place, bronze medalist(s)
José Padilla, Jr.	Lightweight	Stevens (RSA); L	Did not advance			
Carlos Padilla	Welterweight	Laplace (FRA); L	Did not advance			

== Swimming ==
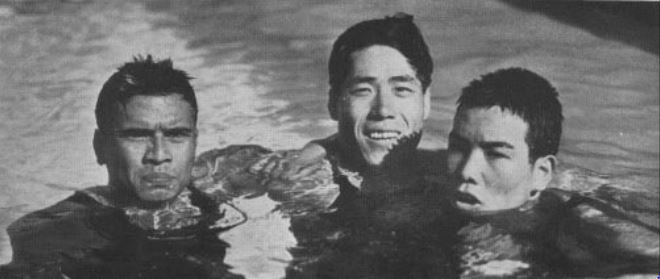
The winners for the 200-meter breaststroke in the 1932 Olympics. Yldefonso is seen at the far left.

The swimming events were held at the Olympic Park Swimming Stadium. Ali competed in the 100-meter freestyle on August 6, specifically in heat four, lane four. He got 1:02.2, gaining the third position in his heat. He didn't qualify, gaining 12th place. On August 11, Adjaluddin and Yldefonso participated in the 200-meter breaststroke. On heat one, Adjaluddin participated, with a time of 2:49.9, qualifying with second place. On heat three, Yldefonso participated, with a time of 2:53.7 in first place, eventually qualifying. In the semi-finals, both participated, with Adjaluddin in heat one. He swam with a time of 2:50.02, gaining third place and qualifying. In heat two, Yldefonso participated, with a time of 2:48.4, gaining second place and qualifying. In the finals, Yldefonso gained third place with a time of 2:47.1, while Adjaluddin gained fifth place with a time of 2:49.2. Yldefonso and Aldjaluddin's times helped beat the record nine times.

Men

Athlete	Event	Heat		Semifinal		Final	
Athlete	Event	Time	Rank	Time	Rank	Time	Rank
Abdurahman Ali	100 m freestyle	1:02.2	3	Did not advance			
Teófilo Yldefonso	200 m breaststroke	2:53.7	1 Q	2:48.4	2 Q	2:47.1	3rd place, bronze medalist(s)
Jikirum Adjaluddin	200 m breaststroke	2:49.9	2 Q	2:50.2	3 Q	2:49.2	5
