= Wrestling at the 1932 Summer Olympics – Men's freestyle featherweight =

Men's freestyle featherweight at the Games of the X Olympiad
- Venue: Grand Olympic Auditorium
- Dates: 1–3 August 1932
- Competitors: 10 from 10 nations

Medalists
1st place, gold medalist(s)		Hermanni Pihlajamäki	Finland
2nd place, silver medalist(s)		Edgar Nemir	United States
3rd place, bronze medalist(s)		Einar Karlsson	Sweden

The men's freestyle featherweight competition at the 1932 Summer Olympics in Los Angeles took place from 1 August to 3 August at the Grand Olympic Auditorium. Nations were limited to one competitor. This weight class was limited to wrestlers weighing up to 61kg.

This freestyle wrestling competition did not use the single-elimination bracket format previously used for Olympic freestyle wrestling but instead followed the format that was introduced at the 1928 Summer Olympics for Greco-Roman wrestling, using an elimination system based on the accumulation of points. Each round featured all wrestlers pairing off and wrestling one bout (with one wrestler having a bye if there were an odd number). The loser received 3 points. The winner received 1 point if the win was by decision and 0 points if the win was by fall. At the end of each round, any wrestler with at least 5 points was eliminated.

== Schedule ==
Date	Event
1 August 1932	Round 1
2 August 1932	Round 2 Round 3
3 August 1932	Round 4 Final round

== Results ==
=== Round 1 ===
Of the five bouts, two were won by fall to give Chasson and Pihlajamäki 0 points while the other three winners each received 1 point for wins by decision. The five losers each received 3 points.

Bouts

Winner	Nation	Victory Type	Loser	Nation
Hermanni Pihlajamäki	Finland	Fall	Herb Rowland	Canada
Edgar Nemir	United States	Decision	Christian Schack	Denmark
Ioannis Farmakidis	Greece	Decision	Ichiro Hatta	Japan
Jean Chasson	France	Fall	Fidel Arellano	Mexico
Einar Karlsson	Sweden	Decision	Joseph Taylor	Great Britain

Points

Rank	Wrestler	Nation	Start	Earned	Total
1	Jean Chasson	France	0	0	0
1	Hermanni Pihlajamäki	Finland	0	0	0
3	John Farmakidis	Greece	0	1	1
3	Einar Karlsson	Sweden	0	1	1
3	Edgar Nemir	United States	0	1	1
6	Fidel Arellano	Mexico	0	3	3
6	Hatta Ichiro	Japan	0	3	3
6	Herb Rowland	Canada	0	3	3
6	Christian Schack	Denmark	0	3	3
6	Joseph William Taylor	Great Britain	0	3	3

=== Round 2 ===
Pihlajamäki quickly became the only remaining 0-point wrestler, with a second win by fall. Farmakidis and Nemir also won by fall this round, staying at 1 point each. Karlsson's second win, like his first, was by decision; he had 2 points after the round. Chasson was the only first-round winner to lose in the second (his facing Farmakidis made it impossible that all five could win), dropping to 3 points. This total was matched by Taylor, the winner of the match-up between two first-round losers. The other four wrestlers who lost in the first round lost again in round 2, being eliminated.

Bouts

Winner	Nation	Victory Type	Loser	Nation
Edgar Nemir	United States	Fall	Herb Rowland	Canada
Hermanni Pihlajamäki	Finland	Fall	Christian Schack	Denmark
John Farmakidis	Greece	Fall	Jean Chasson	France
Einar Karlsson	Sweden	Decision	Hatta Ichiro	Japan
Joseph William Taylor	Great Britain	Fall	Fidel Arellano	Mexico

Points

Rank	Wrestler	Nation	Start	Earned	Total
1	Hermanni Pihlajamäki	Finland	0	0	0
2	John Farmakidis	Greece	1	0	1
2	Edgar Nemir	United States	1	0	1
4	Einar Karlsson	Sweden	1	1	2
5	Jean Chasson	France	0	3	3
5	Joseph William Taylor	Great Britain	3	0	3
7	Fidel Arellano	Mexico	3	3	6
7	Hatta Ichiro	Japan	3	3	6
7	Herb Rowland	Canada	3	3	6
7	Christian Schack	Denmark	3	3	6

=== Round 3 ===
One bout this round was sure to result in elimination, pitting two 3-point wrestlers against each other. Chasson forfeited the bout, leaving Taylor at 3 points. Karlsson survived potential elimination by defeating Farmakidis; the former had 3 points after his third straight win by decision while the latter jumped to 4 points. Nemir also moved to 4 points after losing to Pihlajamäki

Bouts

Winner	Nation	Victory Type	Loser	Nation
Hermanni Pihlajamäki	Finland	Decision	Edgar Nemir	United States
Einar Karlsson	Sweden	Decision	John Farmakidis	Greece
Joseph William Taylor	Great Britain	Forfeit	Jean Chasson	France

Points

Rank	Wrestler	Nation	Start	Earned	Total
1	Hermanni Pihlajamäki	Finland	0	1	1
2	Einar Karlsson	Sweden	2	1	3
2	Joseph William Taylor	Great Britain	3	0	3
4	John Farmakidis	Greece	1	3	4
5	Edgar Nemir	United States	1	3	4
6	Jean Chasson	France	3	3	6

=== Round 4 ===
Pihlajamäki won his fourth bout, picking up a second point with the win by decision and eliminating Farmakidis. Nemir, who started with 4 points and therefore needed a win by fall to continue, won by fall, eliminating Taylor. Karlsson had a bye, staying at 3 points.

Bouts

Winner	Nation	Victory Type	Loser	Nation
Hermanni Pihlajamäki	Finland	Decision	John Farmakidis	Greece
Edgar Nemir	United States	Fall	Joseph William Taylor	Great Britain
Einar Karlsson	Sweden	Bye	N/A	N/A

Points

Rank	Wrestler	Nation	Start	Earned	Total
1	Hermanni Pihlajamäki	Finland	1	1	2
2	Einar Karlsson	Sweden	3	0	3
3	Edgar Nemir	United States	4	0	4
4	Joseph William Taylor	Great Britain	3	3	6
5	John Farmakidis	Greece	4	3	7

=== Final round ===
Pihlajamäki finished with a win over Karlsson, ending 5–0 with a gold medal due to his previous win over Nemir. Karlsson's loss moved him to 6 points and the bronze medal.

Bouts

Winner	Nation	Victory Type	Loser	Nation
Hermanni Pihlajamäki	Finland	Fall	Einar Karlsson	Sweden
Edgar Nemir	United States	Bye	N/A	N/A

Points

Rank	Wrestler	Nation	Start	Earned	Total
1st place, gold medalist(s)	Hermanni Pihlajamäki	Finland	2	0	2
2nd place, silver medalist(s)	Edgar Nemir	United States	4	0	4
3rd place, bronze medalist(s)	Einar Karlsson	Sweden	3	3	6
