= Swimming at the 1932 Summer Olympics – Men's 400 metre freestyle =

Men's 400 metre freestyle at the Games of the X Olympiad
- Venue: LA84 Foundation/John C. Argue Swim Stadium
- Dates: August 8, 1932 (heats); August 9, 1932 (semifinals); August 10, 1932 (final)
- Competitors: 19 from 10 nations
- Winning time: 4:48.4 OR

Medalists
1st place, gold medalist(s)		Buster Crabbe; United States
2nd place, silver medalist(s)		Jean Taris; France
3rd place, bronze medalist(s)		Tsutomu Ōyokota; Japan

The men's 400 metre freestyle was a swimming event held as part of the swimming at the 1932 Summer Olympics programme. It was the sixth appearance of the event, which was established in 1908. The competition was held from Monday August 8, 1932 to Wednesday August 10, 1932.

Nineteen swimmers from ten nations competed. The winning margin was 0.1 seconds which as of 2023 remains the narrowest winning margin in this event at the Olympics.

== Records ==
These were the standing world and Olympic records (in minutes) prior to the 1932 Summer Olympics.

World record	4:47.0	(France) Jean Taris	Paris (FRA)	April 16, 1931
Olympic record	5:01.6	(Argentina) Alberto Zorrilla	Amsterdam (NED)	August 9, 1928

In the first heat Takashi Yokoyama set a new Olympic record with 4:53.2 minutes. He bettered this record in the first semi-final with 4:51.4 minutes. But in the final Buster Crabbe took the Olympic record with 4:48.4 minutes.

== Results ==
=== Heats ===
Monday August 8, 1932: The fastest two in each heat and the fastest third-placed from across the heats advanced to the final.

Heat 1

Place	Swimmer	Time	Qual.
1	Takashi Yokoyama (JPN)	4:53.2	QQ OR
2	James Gilhula (USA)	4:53.3	QQ
3	George Burrows (CAN)	5:28.9	

Heat 2

Place	Swimmer	Time	Qual.
1	Buster Crabbe (USA)	4:59.8	QQ
2	Noboru Sugimoto (JPN)	5:00.2	QQ
3	Norman Wainwright (GBR)	5:12.0	
4	Ignacio Gutiérrez (MEX)	5:29.1	

Heat 3

Place	Swimmer	Time	Qual.
1	Boy Charlton (AUS)	4:59.8	QQ
2	Paolo Costoli (ITA)	5:06.7	QQ
3	Walter Spence (CAN)	5:10.0	qq
4	Gyula Kánásy (HUN)	5:40.8	
5	Manuel Villegas (MEX)	5:54.2	

Heat 4

Place	Swimmer	Time	Qual.
1	Jean Taris (FRA)	4:53.3	QQ
2	Giuseppe Perentin (ITA)	5:09.1	QQ
3	Bob Leivers (GBR)	5:14.6	
4	Nalin Malik (IND)	5:59.0	

Heat 5

Place	Swimmer	Time	Qual.
1	Noel Ryan (AUS)	5:01.9	QQ
2	Tsutomu Ōyokota (JPN)	5:06.3	QQ
3	George Larson (CAN)	5:20.1	

=== Semifinals ===
Tuesday August 9, 1932: The fastest three in each semi-final advanced to the final.

Semifinal 1

Place	Swimmer	Time	Qual.
1	Takashi Yokoyama (JPN)	4:51.4	QQ OR
2	Jean Taris (FRA)	4:52.3	QQ
3	Tsutomu Ōyokota (JPN)	4:52.8	QQ
4	James Gilhula (USA)	4:55.4	
5	Noel Ryan (AUS)	4:59.7	
6	Paolo Costoli (ITA)	5:06.0	

Semifinal 2

Place	Swimmer	Time	Qual.
1	Buster Crabbe (USA)	4:52.7	QQ
2	Noboru Sugimoto (JPN)	4:59.0	QQ
3	Boy Charlton (AUS)	5:02.1	QQ
4	Giuseppe Perentin (ITA)	5:10.5	
5	Walter Spence (CAN)	5:15.6	

=== Final ===
Wednesday August 10, 1932:

Place	Swimmer	Time
1	Buster Crabbe (USA)	4:48.4 OR
2	Jean Taris (FRA)	4:48.5
3	Tsutomu Ōyokota (JPN)	4:52.3
4	Takashi Yokoyama (JPN)	4:52.5
5	Noboru Sugimoto (JPN)	4:56.1
6	Boy Charlton (AUS)	4:58.6
