= Gymnastics at the 1932 Summer Olympics – Men's rings =

Olympic gymnastics event

Men's rings at the Games of the X Olympiad
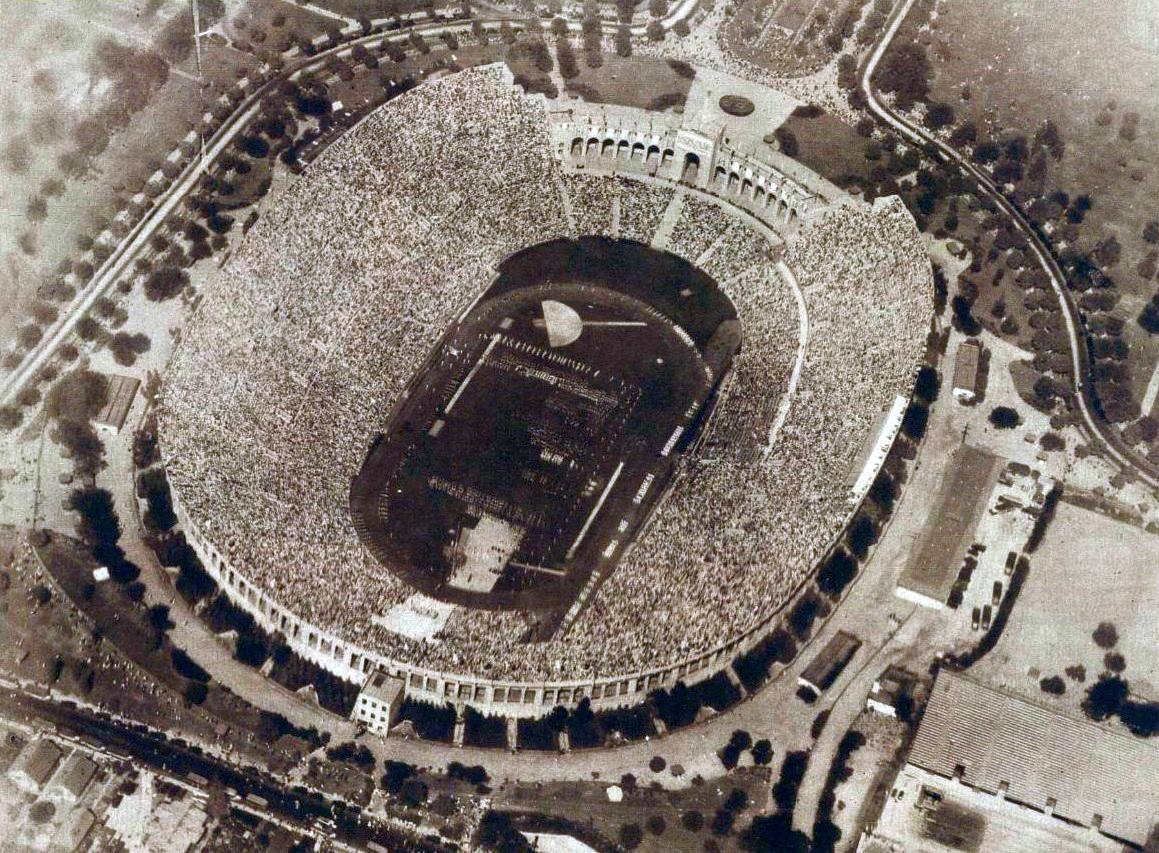
- Olympic Games at the Los Angeles Memorial Coliseum
- Venue: Los Angeles Memorial Coliseum
- Date: 12 August 1932
- Competitors: 14 from 6 nations
- Winning score: 56.9

Medalists
| 1st place, gold medalist(s) | | George Gulack; United States |
| 2nd place, silver medalist(s) | | Bill Denton; United States |
| 3rd place, bronze medalist(s) | | Giovanni Lattuada; Italy |

The men's rings or flying rings event was part of the gymnastics programme at the 1932 Summer Olympics. It was contested for the fifth time after 1896, 1904, 1924, and 1928. The competition was held on Friday, August 12, 1932. Fourteen gymnasts from six nations competed. There were 14 gymnasts from six nations. Each nation was limited to three gymnasts. The event was won by George Gulack of the United States, the nation's first medal in the rings since 1904 and second overall (both on home soil). Another American, Bill Denton, took silver. The United States was not able to complete a repeat of its 1904 sweep, however, as Italy's Giovanni Lattuada beat the third American, Richard Bishop, by one-tenth of a point for the bronze.

== Background ==
This was the fifth appearance of the event, which is one of the five apparatus events held every time there were apparatus events at the Summer Olympics (no apparatus events were held in 1900, 1908, 1912, or 1920). Five of the gymnasts from 1928 returned: fifth-place finisher Mauri Nyberg-Noroma of Finland, twelfth-place finisher Heikki Savolainen of Finland, and thirtieth-place finisher István Pelle of Hungary.

Japan and Mexico each made their debut in the men's rings. The United States made its fourth appearance, most of any nation, having missed only the inaugural 1896 Games.

== Competition format ==
For the second (after 1896) and last time, the rings competition was entirely separate from the individual all-around rather than being entirely aggregated into the all-around or sharing qualification results. Each gymnast performed one compulsory exercise and one voluntary exercise. The score for each exercise was up to 30 points, with a combined score of 60 points maximum.

== Schedule ==
| Date | Time | Round |
|---|---|---|
| Friday, 12 August 1932 | 8:00 | Final |

== Results ==
A separate competition was held, unrelated to the all-around event. Two exercises were contested with the results based on total points.

| Rank | Gymnast | Nation | Compulsory | Voluntary | Total |
|---|---|---|---|---|---|
| 1st place, gold medalist(s) | George Gulack | United States | 28.8 | 28.1 | 56.9 |
| 2nd place, silver medalist(s) | Bill Denton | United States | 28.2 | 27.6 | 55.8 |
| 3rd place, bronze medalist(s) | Giovanni Lattuada | Italy | 27.6 | 27.9 | 55.5 |
| 4 | Richard Bishop | United States | 27.8 | 27.6 | 55.4 |
| 5 | Oreste Capuzzo | Italy | 26.7 | 28.1 | 54.8 |
| 6 | Franco Tognini | Italy | 26.8 | 27.3 | 54.1 |
| 7 | Heikki Savolainen | Finland | 26.9 | 26.2 | 53.1 |
| 8 | Toshihiko Sasano | Japan | 26.4 | 26.0 | 52.4 |
| 9 | Vicente Mayagoitia | Mexico | 24.8 | 26.1 | 50.9 |
| 10 | Takashi Kondo | Japan | 23.8 | 25.3 | 49.1 |
| 11 | Francisco José Álvarez | Mexico | 24.7 | 23.7 | 48.4 |
| 12 | István Pelle | Hungary | 26.7 | — | 26.7 |
| 13 | József Hegedűs | Hungary | 24.4 | — | 24.4 |
| 14 | Mauri Nyberg-Noroma | Finland | 23.6 | — | 23.6 |
