= Boxing at the 1932 Summer Olympics – Flyweight =

Boxing competitions

The men's flyweight event was part of the boxing programme at the 1932 Summer Olympics. The weight class was the lightest contested, and allowed boxers of up to 112 pounds (50.8 kilograms). The competition was held from Tuesday, August 9, 1932 to Saturday, August 13, 1932. Twelve boxers from twelve nations competed.

== Medalists ==
Gold	Silver	Bronze
István Énekes; Hungary	Francisco Cabañas; Mexico	Louis Salica; United States

== Results ==
Round of 16; August 9
Louis Salica (USA)	PTS
Jackie Callura (CAN)	L
Werner Spannagel (GER)	PTS
Juan José Trillo (ARG)	L
István Énekes (HUN)	PTS
Gaston Fayaud (FRA)	L
Edelweis Rodriguez (ITA)	PTS
John Gray (PHI)	L

Quarterfinals; August 10
Thomas Pardoe (GBR)	PTS
Kiyonobu Murakami (JPN)	L
Francisco Cabañas (MEX)	PTS
Ivan Duke (RSA)	L
Louis Salica (USA)	PTS
Werner Spannagel (GER)	L
István Énekes (HUN)	PTS
Edelweis Rodriguez (ITA)	L

Semifinals; August 11
Thomas Pardoe (GBR)	L
Francisco Cabañas (MEX)	PTS
Louis Salica (USA)	L
István Énekes (HUN)	PTS

Final; August 13
Francisco Cabañas (MEX)	L
István Énekes (HUN)	PTS
Bronze medal bout
Louis Salica (USA)	W
Thomas Pardoe (GBR)	w/o
