= Gymnastics at the 1932 Summer Olympics – Men's parallel bars =

Olympic gymnastics event

Men's parallel bars at the Games of the X Olympiad
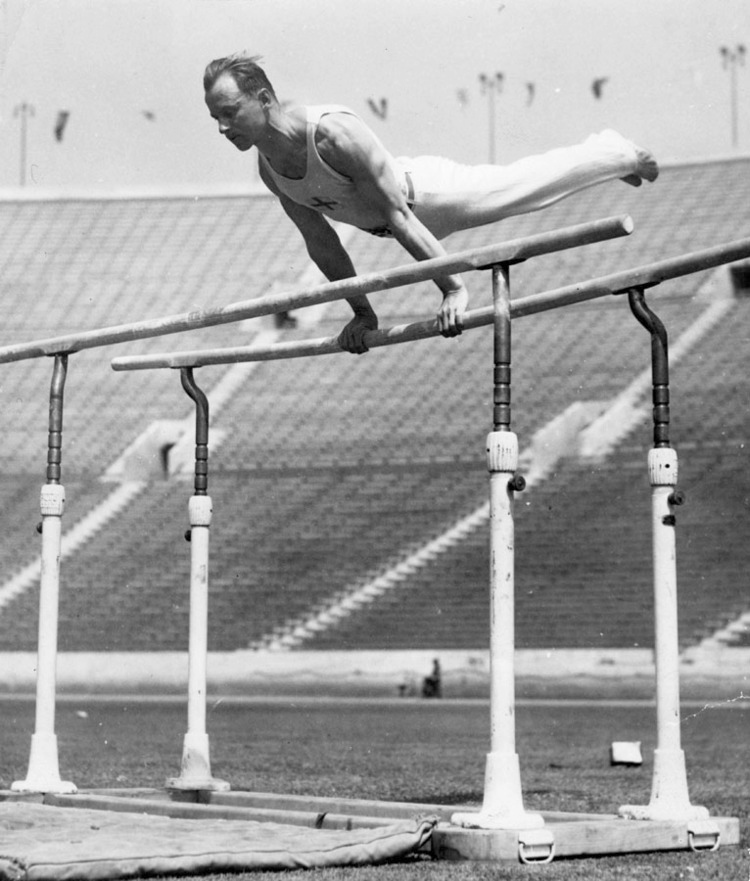
- Heikki Savolainen competing on the parallel bars
- Venue: Los Angeles Memorial Coliseum
- Date: 12 August 1932
- Competitors: 15 from 6 nations
- Winning score: 56.9

Medalists
| 1st place, gold medalist(s) | | Romeo Neri; Italy |
| 2nd place, silver medalist(s) | | István Pelle; Hungary |
| 3rd place, bronze medalist(s) | | Heikki Savolainen; Finland |

The men's parallel bars event was part of the gymnastics programme at the 1932 Summer Olympics. It was contested for the fifth time after 1896, 1904, 1924, and 1928. The competition was held on Friday, August 12, 1932. Fifteen gymnasts from six nations competed. Each nation was limited to three gymnasts. The event was won by Romeo Neri of Italy, the nation's first victory in the men's parallel bars. István Pelle earned Hungary's first medal in the event with his silver, while Heikki Savolainen similarly earned Finland's first medal with his bronze.

== Background ==
This was the fifth appearance of the event, which is one of the five apparatus events held every time there were apparatus events at the Summer Olympics (no apparatus events were held in 1900, 1908, 1912, or 1920). Eight of the 15 gymnast had competed in the Olympics before: Mario Lertora of Italy had finished fifth in 1924 and tied for seventh (with Mauri Nyberg-Noroma of Finland) in 1928. Along with those two seventh-place finishers, other returning gymnasts from 1924 were Romeo Neri of Italy, Heikki Savolainen of Finland, István Pelle and Miklós Péter of Hungary (the latter of whom had finished last in 1928), and Al Jochim and Frank Haubold of the United States. Pelle had won the 1931 world championships.

Japan and Mexico each made their debut in the men's parallel bars. The United States made its fourth appearance, most of any nation, having missed only the inaugural 1896 Games.

== Competition format ==
For the second (after 1896) and last time, the parallel bars competition was entirely separate from the individual all-around rather than being entirely aggregated into the all-around or sharing qualification results. Each gymnast performed one compulsory exercise and one voluntary exercise. The score for each exercise was up to 30 points, with a combined score of 60 points maximum.

== Schedule ==
| Date | Time | Round |
|---|---|---|
| Friday, 12 August 1932 | 8:00 | Final |

== Results ==
A separate competition was held, unrelated to the all-around event. Two exercises were contested with the results based on total points.

| Rank | Gymnast | Nation | Compulsory | Voluntary | Total |
|---|---|---|---|---|---|
| 1st place, gold medalist(s) | Romeo Neri | Italy | 28.2 | 28.7 | 56.9 |
| 2nd place, silver medalist(s) | István Pelle | Hungary | 27.7 | 28.1 | 55.8 |
| 3rd place, bronze medalist(s) | Heikki Savolainen | Finland | 27.5 | 27.3 | 54.8 |
| 4 | Mauri Nyberg-Noroma | Finland | 27.7 | 25.7 | 53.4 |
| 5 | Mario Lertora | Italy | 26.9 | 25.7 | 52.6 |
| 6 | Al Jochim | United States | 26.6 | 25.8 | 52.4 |
| 7 | József Hegedűs | Hungary | 25.7 | 26.2 | 51.9 |
| 7 | Miklós Péter | Hungary | 26.2 | 25.7 | 51.9 |
| 9 | Michael Schuler | United States | 25.7 | 26.1 | 51.8 |
| 10 | Savino Guglielmetti | Italy | 25.0 | 26.1 | 51.1 |
| 11 | Frank Haubold | United States | 25.3 | 25.4 | 50.7 |
| 12 | Toshihiko Sasano | Japan | 24.1 | 24.1 | 48.2 |
| 13 | Vicente Mayagoitia | Mexico | 21.0 | 23.9 | 44.9 |
| 14 | Mahito Haga | Japan | 20.5 | 21.4 | 41.9 |
| 15 | Francisco José Álvarez | Mexico | 20.2 | 21.0 | 41.2 |
