= Athletics at the 1932 Summer Olympics – Men's marathon =

Men's marathon at the Games of the X Olympiad
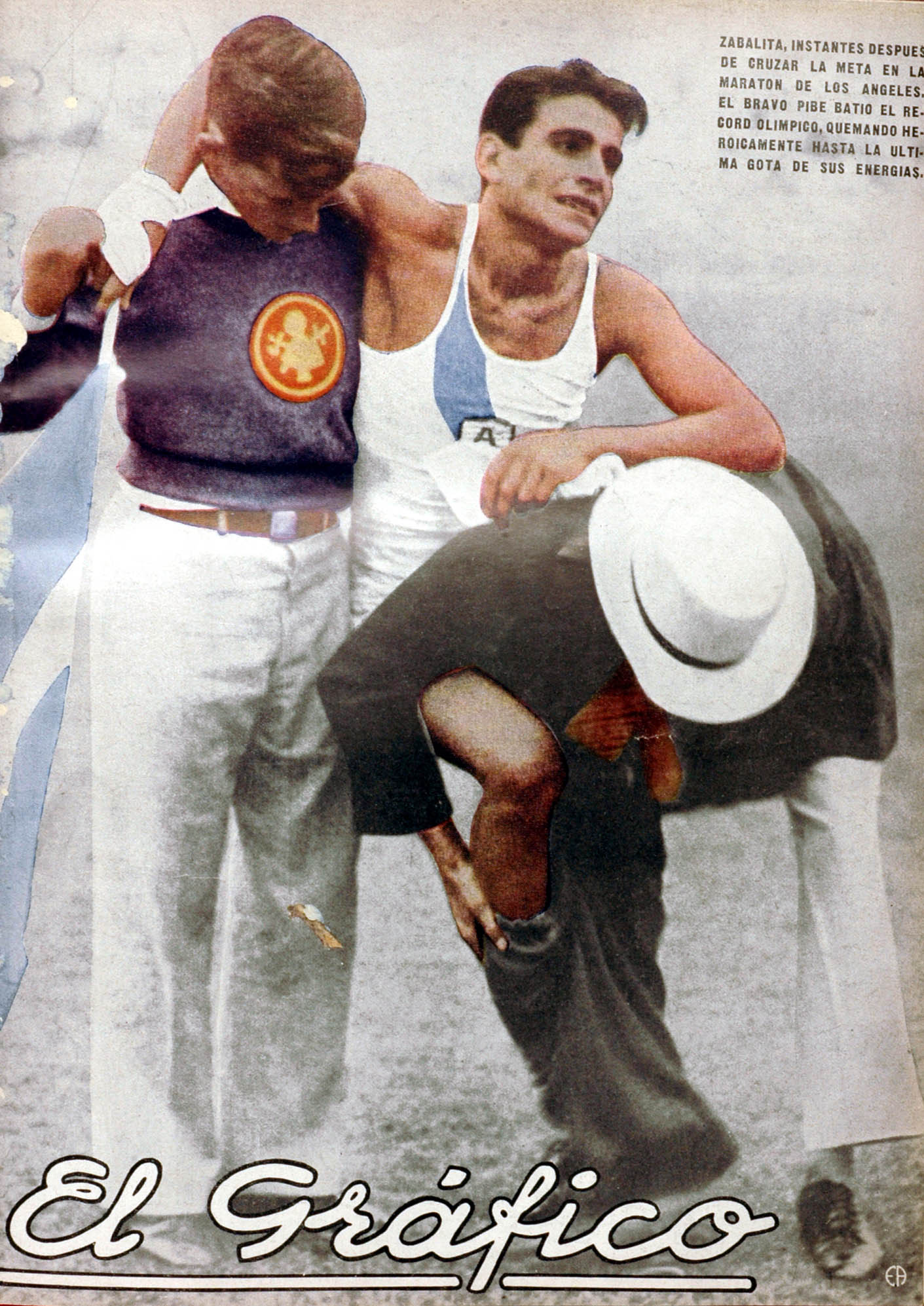
- Juan Carlos Zabala
- Venue: Started and finished at the Los Angeles Memorial Coliseum
- Dates: August 7, 1932
- Competitors: 28 from 14 nations
- Winning time: 2:31:36 OR

Medalists
1st place, gold medalist(s)		Juan Carlos Zabala; Argentina
2nd place, silver medalist(s)		Sam Ferris; Great Britain
3rd place, bronze medalist(s)		Armas Toivonen; Finland

The men's marathon at the 1932 Summer Olympics took place on August 7. It started and finished at the Los Angeles Memorial Coliseum. Twenty-eight athletes from 14 nations competed. The 1930 Olympic Congress in Berlin had reduced the limit from 6 athletes per NOC to 3 athletes. The event was won by Juan Carlos Zabala of Argentina, the nation's first Olympic marathon medal. Great Britain also earned its first Olympic marathon medal with Sam Ferris's silver, while Finland made the marathon podium for a fourth consecutive Games as Armas Toivonen won bronze.

== Background ==
This was the ninth appearance of the event, which is one of 12 athletics events to have been held at every Summer Olympics. Returning runners from 1928 included sixth-place finisher Seiichiro Tsuda of Japan, eighth-place finisher Sam Ferris of Great Britain, ninth-place finisher Albert Michelsen of the United States, and tenth-place finisher Clifford Bricker of Canada. Ferris, along with Dunky Wright (20th in 1928) were among the best-known runners who competed; Armas Toivonen led the always-strong Finnish team. Finland was without Paavo Nurmi, who would have been favored but was suspended just days before the Games began for allegedly accepting excessive expense money in violation of amateurism rules. Finns charged that the Swedish officials, who were in charge of the international athletics federation at the time, had used devious tricks in their campaign against Nurmi's amateur status, and ceased all athletic relations with Sweden.

Argentina, Brazil, and Colombia each made their first appearance in Olympic marathons. The United States made its ninth appearance, the only nation to have competed in each Olympic marathon to that point.

== Competition format ==
As all Olympic marathons, the competition was a single race. The now-standard marathon distance of 26 miles, 385 yards was run over a course that "started and finished at the Los Angeles Memorial Coliseum, but was a loop course around Los Angeles."

== Records ==
Prior to this competition, the existing world and Olympic records were as follows.

World record	Albert Michelsen (USA)	2:29:01.8	Port Chester, United States	12 October 1925
Olympic record	Hannes Kolehmainen (FIN)	2:32:35.8(*)	Antwerp, Belgium	22 August 1920

(*) Course was list at 42.75 kilometres.

== Schedule ==
Date	Time	Round
Sunday, 7 August 1932	15:30	Final

== Results ==
Rank	Athlete	Nation	Time	Notes
1st place, gold medalist(s)	Juan Carlos Zabala	Argentina	2:31:36	OR
2nd place, silver medalist(s)	Sam Ferris	Great Britain	2:31:55	
3rd place, bronze medalist(s)	Armas Toivonen	Finland	2:32:12	
4	Dunky Wright	Great Britain	2:32:41	
5	Seiichiro Tsuda	Japan	2:35:42	
6	Kim Un-bae	Japan	2:37:28	
7	Albert Michelsen	United States	2:39:38	
8	Oskar Hekš	Czechoslovakia	2:41:35	
9	Kwon Tae-ha	Japan	2:42:52	
10	Anders Hartington Andersen	Denmark	2:44:38	
11	Hans Oldag	United States	2:47:26	
12	Clifford Bricker	Canada	2:47:58	
13	Michele Fanelli	Italy	2:49:09	
14	Johnny Miles	Canada	2:50:32	
15	Paul de Bruyn	Germany	2:52:39	
16	François Bégeot	France	2:53:34	
17	Fernando Cicarelli	Argentina	2:55:49	
18	Eddie Cudworth	Canada	2:58:35	
19	João Clemente da Silva	Brazil	3:02:06	
20	Margarito Pomposo	Mexico	3:10:51	
—	José Ribas	Argentina	DNF	
—	Matheus Marcondes	Brazil	DNF	
—	Jorge Perry	Colombia	DNF	
—	Ville Kyrönen	Finland	DNF	
—	Lasse Virtanen	Finland	DNF	
—	Francesco Roccati	Italy	DNF	
—	Santiago Hernández	Mexico	DNF	
—	James Henigan	United States	DNF	
—	René Bonich	Cuba	DNS	
—	Adalberto Cardoso	Brazil	DNS	
—	Alfred Maasik	Estonia	DNS	
—	Billy Savidan	New Zealand	DNS	
—	Franz Tuschek	Austria	DNS	
