= Boxing at the 1932 Summer Olympics – Bantamweight =

Boxing competitions

The men's bantamweight event was part of the boxing programme at the 1932 Summer Olympics. The weight class was the second-lightest contested, and allowed boxers of up to 119 pounds (54.0 kilograms). The competition was held from Tuesday, August 9, 1932 to Saturday, August 13, 1932. Ten boxers from ten nations competed.

== Medalists ==
| Gold | Silver | Bronze |
|---|---|---|
| Horace Gwynne; Canada | Hans Ziglarski; Germany | José Villanueva; Philippines |

== Results ==
Round of 16; August 9
Joseph Lang (USA) | PTS
Sabino Tirado (MEX) | L
Carlos Pereyra (ARG) | PTS
Patrick Hughes (IRL) | L

Quarterfinals; August 10
Horace Gwynne (CAN) | PTS
Vito Melis (ITA) | L
José Villanueva (PHI) | PTS
Akira Nakao (JPN) | L
Hans Ziglarski (GER) | PTS
Paul Nicolas (FRA) | L
Joseph Lang (USA) | W
Carlos Pereyra (ARG) | w/o

Semifinals; August 11
Horace Gwynne (CAN) | PTS
José Villanueva (PHI) | L
Hans Ziglarski (GER) | PTS
Joseph Lang (USA) | L

Final; August 13
Horace Gwynne (CAN) | PTS
Hans Ziglarski (GER) | L
Bronze medal bout
José Villanueva (PHI) | W
Joseph Lang (USA) | w/o
