= Roccati =

Roccati is an Italian surname. Notable people with the surname include:

- Cristina Roccati (1732–1797), Italian physicist and poet
- Francesco Roccati (1908–1969), Italian long-distance runner
- Marco Roccati (born 1975), Italian footballer
