= Carlos Pereyra (boxer) =

Argentine boxer

Carlos Alberto Pereyra (born May 5, 1911) was an Argentine boxer who competed in the 1932 Summer Olympics. He was born in Córdoba. In 1932 he was eliminated in the quarter-finals of the bantamweight class after losing his fight to Joseph Lang.
