= Lattuada =

Lattuada is an Italian surname. Notable people with the surname include:

- Alberto Lattuada (1914–2005), Italian film director
- Felice Lattuada (1882–1962), Italian composer
- Giovanni Lattuada (1905–1984), Italian artistic gymnast
