= Ignacio Gutiérrez =

Ignacio Gutiérrez may refer to:

- José Ignacio Gutiérrez, (born 1977), Spanish cyclist
- Ignacio Gutiérrez (swimmer) (1913–?), Mexican swimmer
- Ignacio Gutiérrez (journalist) (born 1976), Chilean journalist
