= Mike Agassi =

Armenian and Iranian boxer (1930–2021)

- Born: Emanoul Aghasi; December 25, 1930; Salmas, Imperial State of Persia
- Died: September 24, 2021 (aged 90); Las Vegas, Nevada, U.S.
- Occupations: Boxer, tennis coach
- Spouse: Elizabeth Dudley (m. 1959)
- Children: 4, including Andre

Emmanuel "Mike" Agassi (born Emanoul Aghasi; December 25, 1930 – September 24, 2021) was an Iranian-American amateur boxer and tennis coach. He represented Iran in boxing at the 1948 and 1952 Summer Olympics before moving to the United States, where he became a three-time Chicago Golden Gloves champion. After retiring from boxing, he coached his son, tennis player Andre Agassi.

== Early life ==
Agassi was born Emanoul Aghasi (Armenian: Մանվել Աղասի; Persian: امانوئل آغاسی) in Salmas, Iran, to an ethnic Armenian family. His mother, Noonia Majloomian, was an Ottoman subject who traveled to Tehran and settled there after meeting his father, David Agassi, a carpenter from Kiev who fled the Russian Civil War. An ancestor had changed the family surname from Agassian to Agassi to avoid ethnic discrimination.

Agassi was raised in a large, poor Christian household in Tehran. He was introduced to tennis by American and British servicemen stationed in Iran during World War II.

== Boxing and tennis coaching career ==
Agassi represented Iran as a bantamweight boxer in the 1948 and 1952 Summer Olympics, but was eliminated in the first round on both occasions. His trainer was retired Polish-German boxer Hans Ziglarski.

In 1952, Agassi followed his brother Samuel to Chicago. There, he changed his name to Mike Agassi and attended Roosevelt University. After marrying, he moved his family to Las Vegas to take a job at the Tropicana casino.

Agassi trained all of his children in tennis, and stuck them to a 5,000-balls-a-day-regimen. He described his first three children as "guinea pigs" in developing the training methods he later used to coach his youngest son, Andre, into a world-class tennis professional. In the 2009 autobiography Open, Andre recalled that his father and Steffi Graf's father, Peter Graf, nearly came to blows over whether Andre or Steffi had the superior backhand technique after Mike demonstrated the ball machine he had built to train Andre and his siblings.

== Personal life ==
In 1959, Agassi married Elizabeth Dudley at a Methodist church on Chicago's North Side; they had met through a mutual friend. The couple had four children: Rita (b. 1960), Phillip (b. 1962), Tamara (b. 1967), and Andre (b. 1970). From 1984 to 1989, Rita was married to professional tennis player Pancho Gonzales, whom Agassi reportedly disliked.

Agassi's autobiography, The Agassi Story, was published in 2004. He died in Las Vegas on September 24, 2021, at the age of 90.

== See also ==
- Boxing at the 1952 Summer Olympics
- Boxing at the 1948 Summer Olympics
