= Patrick Hughes (boxer) =

Irish boxer

Personal information
- Nationality: Irish
- Born: 24 March 1909 Dublin, Ireland
- Died: 2 September 1994 (aged 85)

Sport
- Sport: Boxing

Patrick Hughes (24 March 1909 – 2 September 1994) was an Irish boxer. He competed in the men's bantamweight event at the 1932 Summer Olympics.
