= Herb Rowland =

Canadian wrestler

Personal information
- Born: 18 May 1911 Montreal, Quebec, Canada
- Died: 14 July 1995 (aged 84) Pointe-Claire, Quebec, Canada

Sport
- Sport: Wrestling

Herb Rowland (18 May 1911 – 14 July 1995) was a Canadian wrestler. He competed in the men's freestyle featherweight at the 1932 Summer Olympics.
