= Clifford Bricker =

Canadian long-distance runner

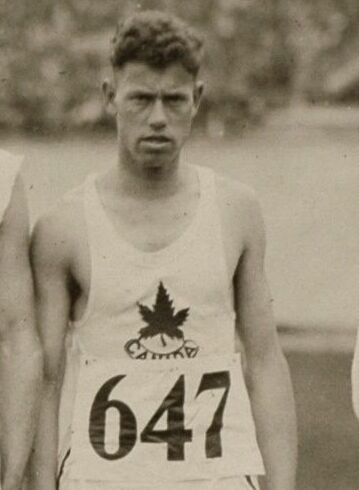
Cliff Bricker (1928)

Clifford Bricker (23 April 1904 – 20 September 1980) was a Canadian long-distance runner who competed in the 1928 and 1932 Summer Olympics. In 1927 he set the amateur world record for 15 miles.

== Career ==
Bricker ran his first marathon in Boston in 1927, clocking 3:00:54 and finishing fourth, more than 20 minutes behind the winner, Clarence DeMar. The following month he won the Buffalo Marathon in 2:40:05, defeating DeMar and setting a Canadian amateur record. On 1 July 1927, he broke the amateur world record for 15 miles (24.14 km) in Toronto, running 1:19:11. Bricker left early for the 1928 Olympics in Amsterdam so he could acclimatize; he was one of Canada's leading Olympic hopes, and DeMar stated he considered Bricker the favorite for the Olympic marathon. He only finished tenth, but his time of 2:39:24 was still his personal best and another Canadian record.

Bricker broke the Canadian record for 10,000 metres at the 1932 Canadian Olympic trials, running 31:42.0. At the 1932 Olympics in Los Angeles he placed eighth in the 10,000 metres and twelfth in the marathon.
