= François Bégeot =

French long-distance runner

Personal information
- Nationality: French
- Born: 11 April 1908 Haillicourt, France
- Died: 28 April 1992 (aged 84)

Sport
- Sport: Long-distance running
- Event: Marathon

François Bégeot (11 April 1908 – 28 April 1992) was a French long-distance runner. He competed in the marathon at the 1932 Summer Olympics.
