= John Gray (boxer) =

Filipino boxer, born 1906

John Henry Gray (April 24, 1906 – January 24, 1964) was a Filipino boxer who competed in the 1932 Summer Olympics.

He was born in Leyte and died in Tacloban, Philippines. He was married to Bessie Mooney. They had eleven children.

He was the son of Elihu Wayne Gray, and Ambrosia Perida. His father (who was born in Searcy County, Arkansas) served in the US military during the Spanish American War in the Philippines.

In 1932 he was eliminated in the first round of the flyweight class after losing his fight to Italy's Edelweis Rodriguez who lost to István Énekes.

Gray also competed in the 1930 Far Eastern Championship Games but he and his teammates withdrew due to officiating of Japanese referees which they deemed arbitrary.

== 1932 Olympic results ==
Below is the record of John Gray, a Filipino flyweight boxer who competed at the 1932 Los Angeles Olympics:

- Round of 16: lost to Edelweis Rodriguez (Italy) on points
