= Eddie Cudworth =

Canadian long-distance runner (1911–1990)

Personal information
- Born: Edward Cudworth; 11 January 1911 Toronto, Ontario, Canada
- Died: 19 February 1990 (aged 79) Toronto, Ontario, Canada

Sport
- Sport: Long-distance running
- Event: Marathon

Eddie Cudworth (11 January 1911 – 19 February 1990) was a Canadian long-distance runner. He competed in the marathon at the 1932 Summer Olympics.
