= Ioannis Farmakidis =

Greek wrestler

Personal information
- Nationality: Greek
- Born: 24 December 1907 Alexandria, Egypt
- Died: December 1980 Greece

Sport
- Sport: Wrestling

Ioannis Farmakidis (24 December 1907 – December 1980) was a Greek wrestler. He competed in the men's freestyle featherweight at the 1932 Summer Olympics.
