= Gyula Kánásy =

Hungarian swimmer (1913–1984)

Personal information
- Born: 22 October 1913 Cegléd, Austria-Hungary
- Died: 16 August 1984 (aged 70) Los Angeles, California, United States

Sport
- Sport: Swimming

Gyula Kánásy (22 October 1913 – 16 August 1984) was a Hungarian swimmer. He competed in the men's 400 metre freestyle at the 1932 Summer Olympics. He won the gold medal with the Hungarian team at the 1938 Men's European Water Polo Championship.
