= Kiyonobu Murakami =

Japanese boxer

Kiyonobu Murakami (村上清信) (24 December 1907 - 8 October 1951) was a Japanese boxer who competed in the 1932 Summer Olympics.

He was the national champion in the flyweight division for two years running in 1930–31, winning at the Japan Amateur Boxing Association's Japanese Amateur Boxing Championships. In 1932 he was eliminated in the quarter-finals of the flyweight class after losing his fight to Thomas Pardoe.
