= Richard Bishop (gymnast) =

American gymnast

- Full name: Richard Alfred Bishop
- Born: August 13, 1910 Syosset, New York, U.S.
- Died: September 8, 1996 (aged 86) Los Angeles, California, U.S.
- Height: 5 ft 5 in (165 cm)

Gymnastics career
- Discipline: Men's artistic gymnastics
- Country represented: United States
- Club: Los Angeles Athletic Club
- Retired: c. 1932

Richard Alfred Bishop (August 13, 1910 – September 8, 1996) was an American gymnast. He was a member of the United States men's national artistic gymnastics team and competed in the men's rings event at the 1932 Summer Olympics.

Bishop attended Franklin High School before graduating from Polytechnic High School in 1930.

As a gymnast, Bishop was a member of the Los Angeles Athletic Club.
