= George Gulack =

American artistic gymnast (1905–1987)

- Gulak c. 1980

Personal information
- Full name: George Julius Gulack
- Born: May 12, 1905 Riga, Russian Empire
- Died: July 27, 1987 (aged 82) Boca Raton, Florida, U.S.

Gymnastics career
- Discipline: Men's artistic gymnastics
- Country represented: United States
- Gym: New York Turnverein
Medal record
Men's artistic gymnastics
Representing United States
Event	1st	2nd	3rd
Olympic Games	1	0	0
Total	1	0	0
Olympic Games
Gold medal – first place	1932 Los Angeles	Rings

George Julius Gulack (May 12, 1905 – July 28, 1987) was an American gymnast and Olympic champion and was involved in gymnastics administration for both the American Athletic Union and the Olympic Committee. He was a member of the United States men's national artistic gymnastics team and competed at the 1932 Summer Olympics in Los Angeles where he received a gold medal on the rings.

== Gymnastics career ==
As a youth in Latvia, Gulack divided his time between gymnastics, becoming the national all-around champion in 1921, and pole-vaulting but after immigrating to America around 1922 he narrowed his focus, and competed exclusively as a competitive gymnast. He was a member of New York Turnverein. His best event was the rings, taking the Olympic gold medal in 1932 at the tenth Olympiad in Los Angeles as well as two national titles; one in 1928 as recognized by the American Athletic Union, and one in 1935. He also competed in floor exercises and the parallel bars. After George's gold medal in 1932, the American Gymnastics team would experience a fifty-year drought, not winning another gold until 1984.

== Service with gymnastics organizations ==
After retiring from gymnastics competition around 1935, Gulack had a vital role serving with the Olympic committee and American and international gymnastics organizations. He was a member of the U.S. Olympic Committee from 1934 to 1958. In 1948 he helped the American Athletic Union (AAU) design a new set of rules to conform to international standards. He was the manager of the US Olympic Gymnastics team in 1948, and an international judge for nearly 25 years. He was Chairman of the American Athletic Union Gymnastics Committee in 1958. In 1960 and 1964, he served as U.S. Olympic Gymnastics chairman. He was a member of the executive committee of the International Gymnastics Federation (FIG) in 1960, and FIG vice president from 1964 to 1972. On an international level, he served as president of the Pan-American Gymnastics Federation in 1959 and honorary chairman of the Central American Gymnastics Federation in 1970.

=== Tokyo Olympics controversy ===
Gulak was involved in a controversy during the year of the 1964 Tokyo Olympics when wives of the members of some of the American team left before completing a tour of Japanese cities to which they had been invited after the Olympics. Gulack felt strongly that the wives, as important representatives of the team, should remain on the tour, after several had made plans to leave, and had already boarded trains to leave. Abie Grossfeld, the Assistant Head Coach of the Men's team was particularly displeased with Gulack's insistence that the wives remain on the multi-city Japanese tour, and another member of the Gymnastics team, Ron Barak felt strongly his wife should be allowed to leave as she had dysentery. There was also an issue of nepotism as several Gymnastic coaches and team members resented the fact that Fay Gulak, George's wife, had been selected as a judge at the World Championships, the National Championships, and the Olympic Trial gymnastic competitions without having had any significant experience with Gymnastics. The gymnasts and coaches who sided against Gulak's management convinced Gulak and his wife to leave the tour, though a meeting between Gymnastics Coach Abie Grossfeld and AAU officials back in America did not result in specific penalties for the rebelling group or the Gulaks. As a result of the controversy, six years later in 1970, the American Athletics Union was replaced by the United States Gymnastics Federation as the Gymnastics organization recognized by the International Federation of Gymnastics Congress.

George and his wife Fay retired to Boca Raton around 1983 from Connecticut. He had worked as a building construction contractor in prior years. Gulack died on July 28, 1987, at the age of 82.

== Awards and honors ==
In 1984, he was inducted into the International Jewish Sports Hall of Fame. His 1932 Gymnastics Team Jersey, in which he won the gold Olympic medal in rings, was displayed at the International Gymnastics Hall of Fame in Oceanside, Florida. The exhibit is now located in Oklahoma City, Oklahoma.

== See also ==
- List of select Jewish gymnasts
