= Hans Ziglarski =

German boxer

Olympic medal record

Men's Boxing

Representing Germany
Silver medal – second place	1932 Los Angeles	bantamweight

Hans Ziglarski (Polish: Jan Żyglarski, 16 October 1905 in Białystok, Russian Empire – 12 February 1975) was a Polish-German boxer who competed in the 1928 Summer Olympics and in the 1932 Summer Olympics.

In 1928 he lost his first fight against Vince Glionna and was eliminated in the first round of the bantamweight competition. Four years later he won the silver medal in the bantamweight class after losing the final against Horace Gwynne. After World War II, Ziglarski went to Tehran and coached the Iranian boxer Emmanuel Agassi, the father of tennis player Andre Agassi.

== Olympic results ==
- 1928 competed at the Amsterdam Olympics at Bantamweight. Result was:
  - Lost to Vince Glionna (Canada) PTS
- 1932 won the Bantamweight silver medal at the Los Angeles Olympics. Results were:
  - Quarterfinal: Defeated Paul Nicolas (France) PTS
  - Semifinal: Defeated Joseph Lang (United States) PTS
  - Final: Lost to Horace Gwynne (Canada) PTS
