= Fidel Arellano =

Mexican wrestler

Personal information
- Born: 10 January 1907 Chiaucingo, Mexico
- Died: 6 November 2005 (aged 98)

Sport
- Sport: Wrestling

Fidel Arellano (10 January 1907 – 6 November 2005) was a Mexican wrestler. He competed in the men's freestyle featherweight at the 1932 Summer Olympics.
