= Vito Melis =

Italian boxer

Vito Melis (May 10, 1909 – October 23, 1976) was an Italian boxer who competed in the 1932 Summer Olympics. He was born in Cagliari. In 1932 he was eliminated in the quarter-finals of the bantamweight class after losing his fight to the eventual gold medalist Horace Gwynne.
