= Bill Denton =

American artistic gymnast

- Born: William Thomas Denton; February 1, 1911 Collinsville, Texas, U.S.
- Died: March 8, 1946 (aged 35) Washington, D.C., U.S.

Gymnastics career
- Discipline: Men's artistic gymnastics
- Country represented: United States
- College team: Navy Midshipmen (1931–1933)
Medal record
Men's artistic gymnastics
Representing United States
| Event | 1st | 2nd | 3rd |
|---|---|---|---|
| Olympic Games | 0 | 1 | 0 |
| Total | 0 | 1 | 0 |
Olympic Games
| Silver medal – second place | 1932 Los Angeles | Rings |

William Thomas Denton (February 1, 1911 – March 8, 1946) was an American artistic gymnast. He was a member of the United States men's national artistic gymnastics team and competed in the 1932 Summer Olympics.

He was born in Collinsville, Texas and died in Washington, D.C.

In 1932 he won the silver medal in the rings competition. He served as team captain for the Navy Midshipmen men's gymnastics team during the 1933 season.
