= Tsutomu Ōyokota =

Japanese swimmer (1913–1970)

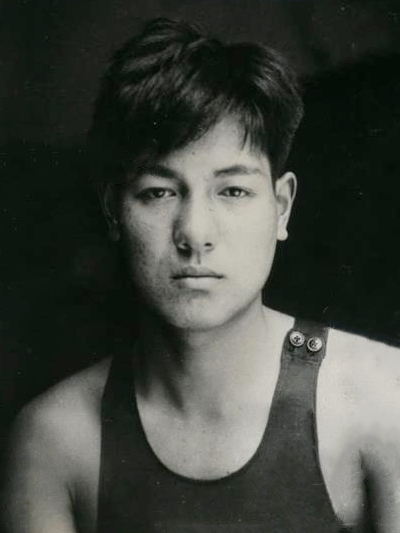
- Oyokota in 1932

Personal information
- Full name: 大横田 勉
- Nationality: Japanese
- Born: April 20, 1913 Hiroshima Prefecture, Japan
- Died: 1970 (aged 56–57)

Sport
- Sport: Swimming
- Strokes: freestyle
Medal record
Representing Japan
Olympic Games
| Bronze medal – third place | 1932 Los Angeles | 400 m freestyle |

Tsutomu Ōyokota (大横田 勉, Ōyokota Tsutomu; April 20, 1913 – 1970) was a Japanese freestyle swimmer. While a student at Meiji University, he set national records over 200 m (2:14.6) and 400 m (4:50.4). He was selected for the 1932 Olympics and won a bronze medal in the 400 m event, despite suffering a severe bout of gastroenteritis before the Games.
