= Matheus Marcondes =

Brazilian long-distance runner

Personal information
- Born: November 1903 Rio de Janeiro, Brazil

Sport
- Sport: Long-distance running
- Event: Marathon

Matheus Marcondes (born November 1903, date of death unknown) was a Brazilian long-distance runner. He competed in the marathon at the 1932 Summer Olympics.
