= James Gilhula =

American swimmer (1912–1962)

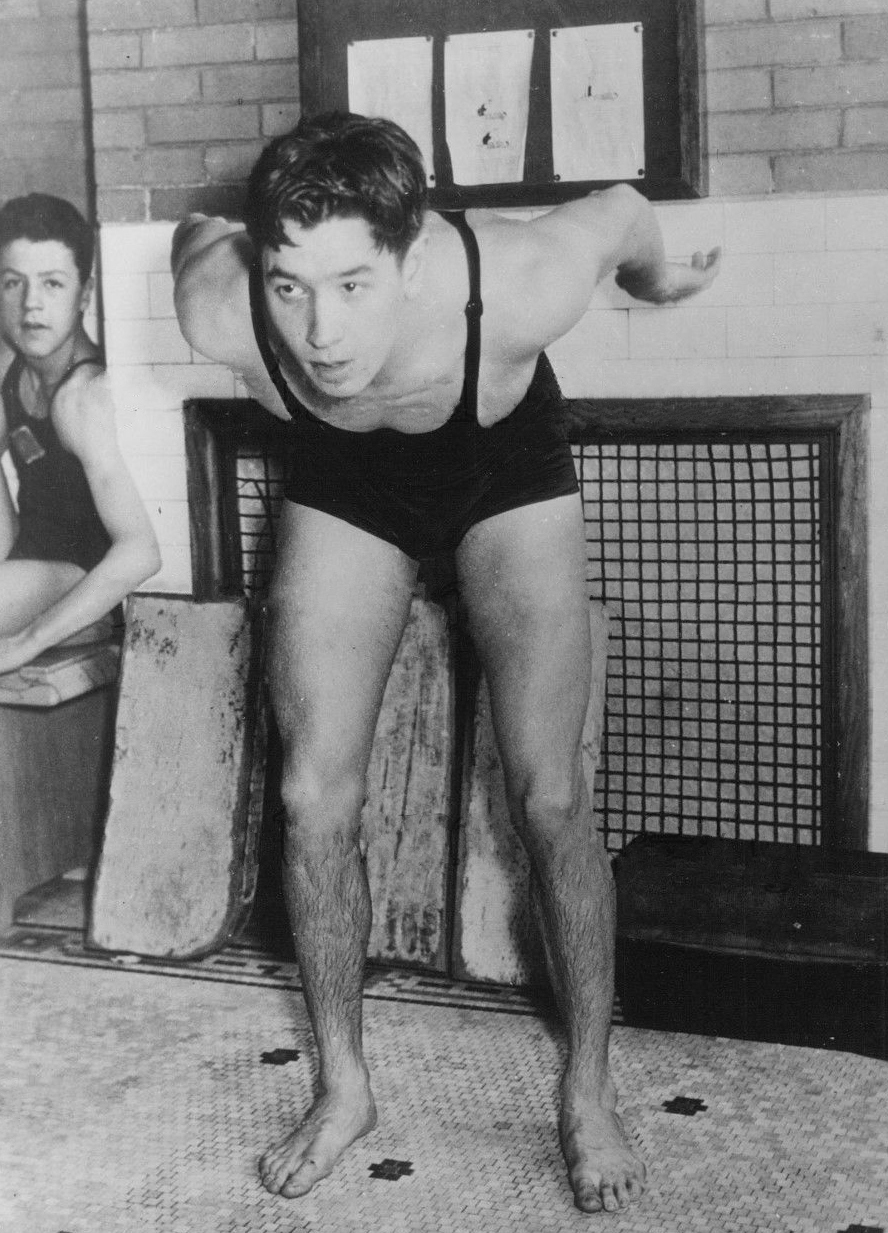
- Gilhula in 1931

Personal information
- Full name: James Raymond Gilhula
- Nickname: "Jim" or "Jimmy"
- National team: United States
- Born: June 14, 1912 Boone, Colorado, U.S.
- Died: March 11, 1962 (aged 49) San Diego, California, U.S.
- Spouse: Georgann

Sport
- Sport: Swimming
- Strokes: Freestyle
- Club: Detroit Athletic Club
- College team: University of Southern California
- Coach: Robert J. H. Kiphuth (32 Olympics); Fred Cady (USC)

James "Jim" Raymond Gilhula (June 14, 1912 – March 11, 1962) was an American competition swimmer who swam for the University of Southern California and represented the United States at the 1932 Summer Olympics in Los Angeles, California. Graduating USC in 1936, he married in 1937, and was a WWII Navy veteran who trained swimmers as part of his duties. He later worked as a policeman and later in regional tire sales in San Diego.

Gilhula was born June 4, 1912 in Boone, Colorado to Percy and Mignon Garnet Jones Gilhula. After a family move, he swam for Detroit's, Southeastern High School. On June 23, 1932, he broke the national record for the 500-meter freestyle with a time of 6:23.1, bettering Johnny Weismuller's former record set in 1922. On March 15, 1931, Gilhula broke the standing interscholastic world record in the 100-yard freestyle with a time of 53.3 at an exhibition at the Michigan State Swimming Meet in East Lansing.

In national competition, in 1933 Gilhula was an AAU Champion in the 100 freestyle in 1933 and in 1934-35 was an AAU Champion in the 200 freestyle.

== 1932 Los Angeles Olympics ==
Around the age of 20 at the 1932 U.S. Olympic trials in mid-July in Cincinnati, Ohio, Gilhula placed second in the 400-meter freestyle, qualifying for the U.S. team.

At the 1932 Los Angeles Olympics, Gilhula competed in the semifinals of the 400-meter freestyle, placing fourth with a time of 4:55.4.

=== University of Southern California ===
Graduating in 1936, Gilhula attended the University of Southern California under Head Swimming and Diving Coach Fred Cady. Representing USC On February 34, 1934, he won the 220-yard freestyle for the Southern Pacific AAU National Championships at the Los Angeles Athletic Club. While at USC, in 1936, Gilhula was a recipient of All American honors by the College Swimming & Diving Coaches Association of America in the 100, 220, and 440 frestyle events. By 1935, Gilhula held interscholastic records in the 500 meters, 600 yards, 700 yards, 800 yards, 1000 yards, up to the mile distance of 1640 yards.

=== Later life ===
Gilhula married Georgann Daggett in 1937, and the couple had one child. From 1942-45, he served in the U.S. Navy where he reached the rank of Chief Petty Officer, and trained navy personnel in swimming. In 1944, he was a Chief Boatswain's mate at Goat Island, San Francisco.

In later careers, Gilhula worked as a policeman and later in regional tire sales.

He died March 11, 1962 at the age of 49 at a Hospital in San Diego, California.
