= Hans Oldag =

American long-distance runner

Personal information
- Nationality: German; American
- Born: March 2, 1901 Lübtheen, Germany
- Died: August 1978 North Tonawanda, New York, United States

Sport
- Sport: Long-distance running
- Event: Marathon

Hans Oldag (March 2, 1901 – August 1978) was an American long-distance runner. He competed in the marathon at the 1932 Summer Olympics.
