= João Clemente da Silva =

Brazilian long-distance runner

Personal information
- Born: 24 November 1904 Rio de Janeiro, Brazil

Sport
- Sport: Long-distance running
- Event: Marathon

João Clemente da Silva (born 24 November 1904, date of death unknown) was a Brazilian long-distance runner. He competed in the marathon at the 1932 Summer Olympics.
