= Werner Spannagel =

German boxer

Werner Spannagel (6 October 1909 – 11 August 1943) was a German boxer who competed in the 1932 Summer Olympics. He was born in Dahlerau. At the 1932 Summer Olympics he was eliminated in the quarter-finals of the flyweight class after losing his fight to the upcoming bronze medalist Louis Salica. In the Second World War, he was sent to the Eastern Front and fought in the army of the Nazi Germany. News of his death was received on 23 December 1943.
