= Eugenia Escudero =

Mexican fencer (1914–2011)

Eugenia Escudero Lavat
Personal information
- Full name: Eugenia Lucrecia Escudero Lavat
- Nationality: Mexican
- Born: 26 November 1914 Mexico City, Mexico
- Died: 18 January 2011 (aged 96) Ensenada, Baja California, Mexico

Sport
- Sport: Fencing

Eugenia Escudero Lavat (26 November 1914 – 18 January 2011) was a Mexican fencer. She competed in the women's individual foil event at the 1932 Summer Olympics. She married Hans Backhoff and had 5 children. Escudero died on 18 January 2011, at the age of 96.
