= Gustavo Salinas Camiña =

Gustavo Adolfo Salinas Camiña
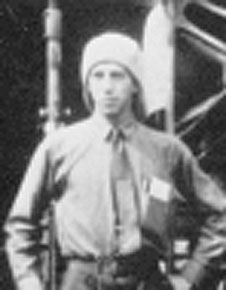
- Salinas Caamiña, was a pioneer aviator.
- Born: 1893
- Died: 5 March 1964
- Military career
- Allegiance: Mexico
- Rank: Captain

Gustavo Adolfo Salinas Camiña (17 July 1893 – 5 March 1964) was a pioneer aviator, and Mexican sports shooter.

== Military record ==
He was the first to use a plane to attack a ship at sea in the action of 9 April 1914. He is buried in the "Panteón Municipal San José" located in the city of Cuatro Ciénegas de Carranza, Coahuila, México.

== Sports shooting ==
He competed in the 25 m rapid fire pistol and the 50 m rifle events at the 1932 Summer Olympics. He also won two golds, three silvers, and two bronze medals at two editions of the Central American and Caribbean Games.
