= Valentín González (athlete) =

Mexican long-distance runner

Personal information
- Full name: Valentín González Avila
- Nationality: Mexican
- Born: 21 May 1910
- Died: 26 February 1943 (aged 32)

Sport
- Sport: Long-distance running
- Event: 5000 metres

Valentín González Avila (21 May 1910 – 26 February 1943) was a Mexican long-distance runner. He competed in the 5000 metres at the 1932 Summer Olympics and the 1936 Summer Olympics.
