= Sabino Tirado =

Mexican boxer

Personal information
- Nationality: Mexican
- Born: 29 August 1910

Sport
- Sport: Boxing

Sabino Tirado (born 29 August 1910, date of death unknown) was a Mexican boxer. He competed in the men's bantamweight event at the 1932 Summer Olympics.
