= Gerónimo Delgadillo =

Mexican fencer

Personal information
- Born: June 15, 1900 Ameca, Jalisco, Mexico
- Died: January 3, 1960 (aged 59) Mexico City, Mexico

Sport
- Sport: Fencing

Gerónimo Delgadillo (June 15, 1900 – January 3, 1960) was a Mexican Olympic fencer. He competed in the individual and team épée and sabre events at the 1932 Summer Olympics.
