= Abdurahman Ali (swimmer) =

Filipino swimmer

Personal information
- Born: 6 June 1911 Jolo, Sulu Sultanate

Sport
- Sport: Swimming

Abdurahman Ali (born 6 June 1911, date of death unknown) was a Filipino swimmer. He competed in the men's 100 metre freestyle at the 1932 Summer Olympics. He was killed in action during World War II.
