= Christian Schack =

Danish wrestler (1901–1958)

Personal information
- Nationality: Danish
- Born: 14 April 1901; Aarhus, Denmark
- Died: 27 July 1958 (aged 54); Aarhus, Denmark

Sport
- Sport: Wrestling

Christian Schack (14 April 1901 – 27 July 1958) was a Danish wrestler. He competed in two events at the 1932 Summer Olympics.
