= Thomas Pardoe (boxer) =

English boxer

Tommy Pardoe
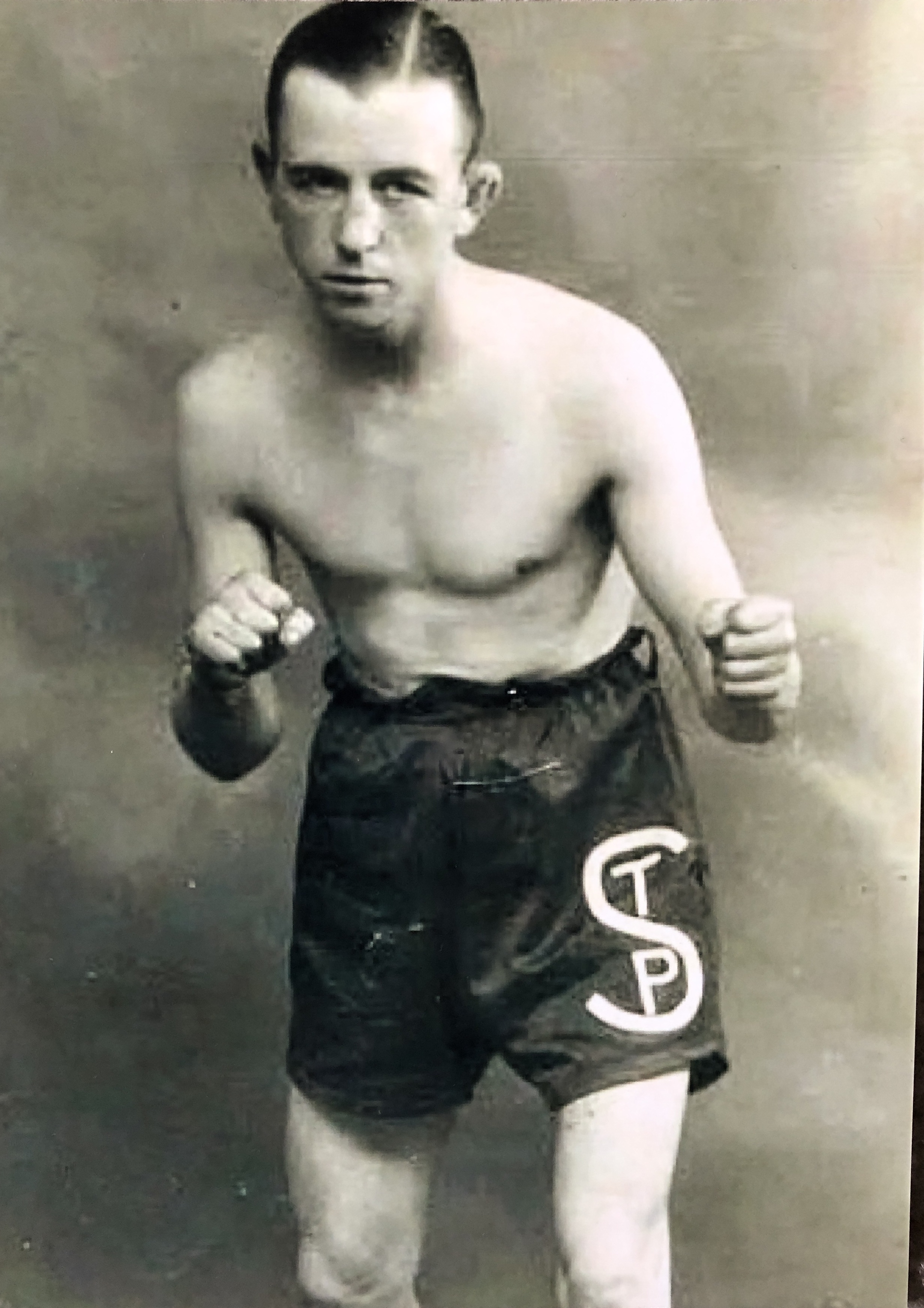

Personal information
- Nationality: British (English)
- Born: 13 January 1912 Birmingham, England
- Died: 7 December 1992 (aged 80) Birmingham, England

Sport
- Sport: boxing
Medal record
Men's Boxing
Representing England
British Empire Games
Silver medal – second place	1930 Hamilton	Flyweight

Thomas Leonard Pardoe (13 January 1912 – 7 December 1992) was an English boxer who competed for Great Britain in the 1932 Summer Olympics and fought as Tommy Pardoe.

== Boxing career ==
=== Amateur record ===
As an amateur Pardoe a five times champion of Britain winning the Amateur Boxing Association British flyweight title, when boxing out of the Metropolitan ABC during the years 1929, 1930, 1931, 1932 and 1933.

At the 1930 British Empire Games he won the silver medal in the flyweight class after losing the final to Jacob Smith.

Two years later in 1932 he finished fourth at the 1932 Olympic Games in the flyweight class after losing the bronze-medal bout by walkover to Louis Salica of the United States.

1932 Olympic record

- Round of 16: bye
- Quarterfinal: defeated Kiyonobu Murakami (Japan) on points
- Semifinal: lost to Francisco Cabañas (Mexico) on points
- Bronze Medal Bout: lost to Louis Salica (USA) by walkover

=== Professional career ===
He turned professional and on 11 December 1933 won his first fight with Bert Kirby, whom he again defeated on 12 March 1934 in the British (Southern Area) Flyweight Title. On 11 June 1934, he beat Joe Mendiola and then fought Benny Lynch 15 April 1935.

He put up a tremendous fight against Lynch in an eliminator for British Flyweight title, winning five of the last six rounds, but bearing in mind Lynch's superior experience (82 professional fights), he was knocked out in the fourteenth round. This fight seemed to spell the end of Pardoe's professional career; he had a further seven fights, but did not win another professional fight.

== Personal life ==
Tommy Pardoe was born on 14 April 1911 and lived at 8 Church Walk, Ward End Birmingham, one of fifteen children. He died 7 December 1992.
