= Edgar Nemir =

American wrestler

Personal information
- Born: July 23, 1910 Waco, Texas, U.S.
- Died: February 1, 1969 (aged 58) Reno, Nevada, U.S.
Medal record
Men's freestyle wrestling
Representing the United States
Olympic Games
Silver medal – second place	1932 Los Angeles	61 kg

Edgar Nemir (July 23, 1910 – February 1, 1969) was an American freestyle wrestler who competed in the 1932 Summer Olympics. He won the silver medal in the freestyle featherweight division. Nemir was born in Waco, Texas and died in Reno, Nevada.
