= Chiaucingo =

Coordinates: 17°44′31″N 98°41′50″W

Chiaucingo Chapancingo
- City
- Motto(s): Effort and Desarrolo
- Location in Mexico
- Country: Mexico
- State: Guerrero
- Municipal seat: Cualac

Area
  - Total: 27 km^{2} (10 sq mi)
- Elevation: 1,365 m (4,478 ft)

Population (2010)
  - Total: 1,331
- Time zone: UTC-6 (Central Time)
  - Summer (DST): -5
- Postal code: 41080
- Area code: 757

Chiaucingo is a city in the Cualac municipality of the state of Guerrero in Mexico. With a population of 1,331 inhabitants, it is the second largest populated settlement in Cualac. In Chiaucingo, 53.76% of adults speak an indigenous language.
