= Ichiro Hatta =

Japanese judoka and wrestler

- 八田一朗
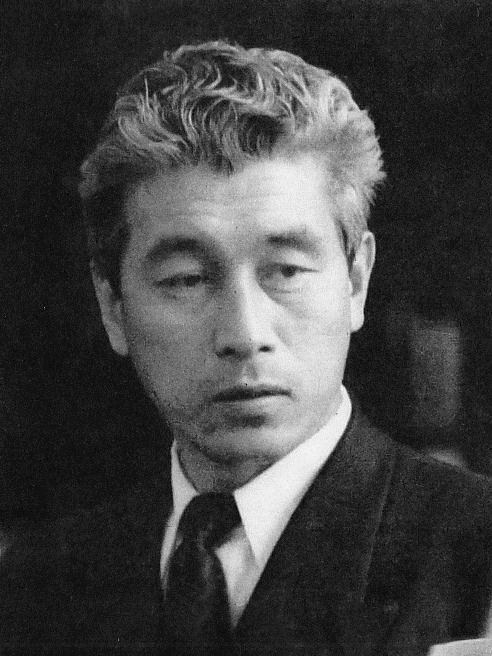
- Hatta in 1954

Member of the House of Councillors
- In office 4 July 1965 – 3 July 1971
- Constituency: National district

Personal details
- Born: 3 June 1906 Etajima, Hiroshima, Japan
- Died: 15 April 1983 (aged 76) Tokyo, Japan
- Sports career
- Sport: Freestyle wrestling, judo

Ichiro Hatta (八田一朗, Hatta Ichirō; 3 June 1906 – 15 April 1983) was a Japanese judoka and wrestler. He was instrumental in founding the Japanese Amateur Wrestling Association and bringing the 1964 Olympics to Japan.

== Biography ==
Originally a judo specialist and a secretary to Kanō Jigorō he helped popularize judo in the United States and Europe. He later received the Olympic Order from the International Olympic Committee for his contributions to judo and the Olympics. In 1929 Hatta held 4th dan in judo, and by 1952 progressed to the 7th dan. Judo became an Olympic sport only in 1964, and therefore at the 1932 Olympics Hatta competed in freestyle wrestling. After that he helped establish the Japanese Amateur Wrestling Association, and at the 1936 Olympics was the head coach of the national wrestling team. Later he served in the House of Councillors, the Japanese upper house of the legislature.

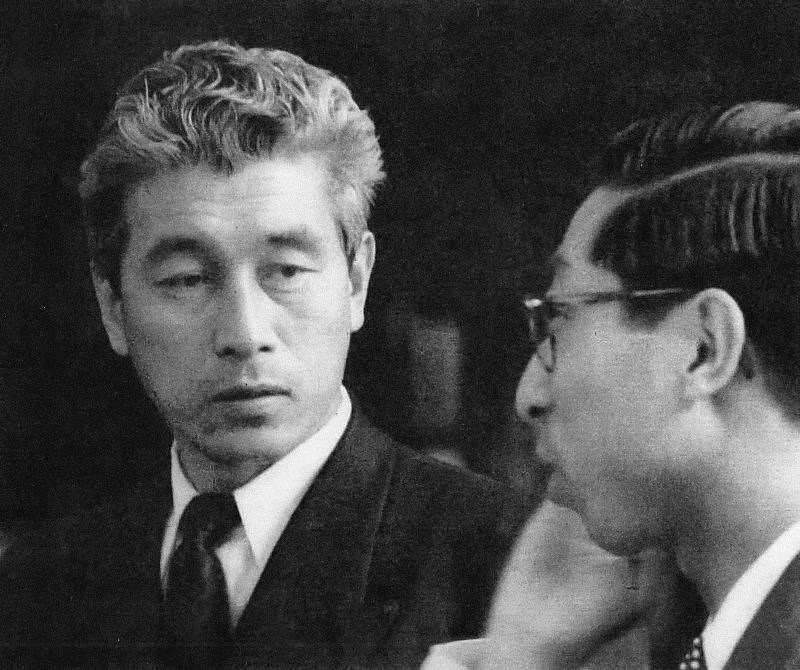
Ichiro Hatta (left) with Prince Takahito in 1954

In 1965, Hatta also helped Victor Koga to form the Japanese Sambo Federation. His sons Tadaaki Hatta and Masaaki Hatta were accomplished wrestlers at Oklahoma State. Tadaaki was a 1965 NCAA champion, two-time All-American, and coached Olympic and world teams for Japan, USA, and Mexico for 50 years starting in 1968. Maasaki was an NCAA championship in 1962, placed second in freestyle at that year's world championships, three-time NCAA All-American, AAU All-American, and later coached Olympic gold medalist Steve Fraser.
