= Fernando Ramírez (Mexican athlete) =

Mexican sprinter

Personal information
- Nationality: Mexican

Sport
- Sport: Sprinting
- Event: 100 metres

Fernando Ramírez was a Mexican sprinter. He competed in the men's 100 metres at the 1932 Summer Olympics.
