= Akira Nakao (boxer) =

Japanese boxer

Akira Nakao (中尾 明, Nakao Akira, born October 14, 1909, date of death unknown) was a Japanese boxer who competed in the 1932 Summer Olympics. He was eliminated in the quarter-finals of the bantamweight class after losing his fight to the eventual bronze medalist José Villanueva.
