= Taika Gon =

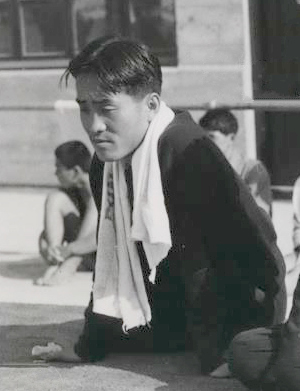
- Taika Gon at the 1932 Olympics

Personal information
- Born: June 2, 1906 Cheongju, Chungcheongbuk, South Korea
- Died: October 10, 1971 (aged 65)
- Height: 1.65 m (5 ft 5 in)
- Weight: 54 kg (119 lb)

Sport
- Sport: Athletics
- Event: Marathon

Achievements and titles
- Personal best: 2:35:12 (1932)

Taika Gon (権 泰夏, originally Tae-ha Kwon, Korean: 권태하, June 2, 1906 – October 10, 1971) was a Korean long-distance runner. He competed in the marathon at the 1932 Olympics and finished in ninth place. He competed for Japan under his Japanese name as Korea, Empire of Japan was part of the Japanese Empire at the time. The name is based on the Japanese kanji pronunciation of his Korean hanja name.
