= Horace Gwynne =

Canadian boxer

Personal information
- Nickname: "Lefty"
- Nationality: Canadian
- Born: October 5, 1912 Toronto, Ontario
- Died: April 16, 2001 (aged 88) Toronto, Ontario
- Height: 1.56 m (5 ft 1 in)
- Weight: 53 kg (117 lb)

Boxing career
- Weight class: Bantamweight
- Stance: Southpaw

Boxing record
- Total fights: 50
- Wins: 40
- Win by KO: 6
- Losses: 8
- Draws: 2
Medal record
Men's boxing
Representing Canada
Olympic Games
Gold medal – first place	1932 Los Angeles	Bantamweight

Horace "Lefty" Gwynne (October 5, 1912 – April 16, 2001) was a bantamweight professional boxer from Canada, who competed in the 1930s and won the gold medal at the 1932 Summer Olympics. He was still an amateur when he won the gold medal.

Born in Toronto, Gwynne left school after grade 8, weighing only 65 lb (29.5 kg). When he started to grow, he began working out in Stokley's Gym in Toronto to lose weight in order to become a jockey.

== Amateur career ==
At age nineteen he won the Canadian amateur flyweight championship in London, Ontario. He entered the 1932 Olympic trials as a bantamweight, a class permitting up to 118 lb (53.5 kg); he weighed 116.

Gwynne won the Canadian amateur bantamweight title, which sent him to the 1932 Summer Olympics in Los Angeles, despite his having fought only fifteen bouts before the Games. He won the Olympic gold medal match against the German Hans Ziglarski, knocking him down in the second round and winning on points. It took 56 years for another Canadian, Lennox Lewis in 1988, to win an Olympic boxing gold medal.

=== 1932 Olympic results ===
Below is a list of Horace Gwynne's bouts from the 1932 Los Angeles Olympics:

- Quarterfinal: Defeated Vito Melis (Italy) PTS
- Semifinal Defeated José Villanueva (Philippines) PTS
- Final: Defeated Hans Ziglarski (Germany) PTS (won gold medal)

== Pro career ==
Immediately after the 1932 Los Angeles Olympics, Gwynne turned professional. He won the Canadian professional bantamweight title in 1939 and retired after two more bouts without defending the title. Gwynne's professional record was 40 wins (6 KO), eight losses (1 KO), and two draws.

== Honors ==
Gwynne has been inducted into the Canadian Boxing Hall of Fame and the Canadian Sports Hall of Fame. He died in Toronto.
