= Paul Nicolas (boxer) =

French boxer

Personal information
- Nationality: French
- Born: 2 July 1914; Perpignan, France
- Died: 23 July 2002 (aged 88); Perpignan, France

Sport
- Sport: Boxing

Paul Nicolas (2 July 1914 – 23 July 2002) was a French boxer. He competed in the men's bantamweight event at the 1932 Summer Olympics. He died in Perpignan in July 2002 at the age of 88.
