= Margarito Pomposo =

Mexican long-distance runner

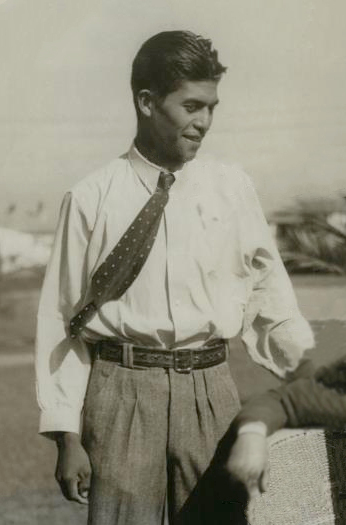
- Pomposo at the 1932 Olympics

Personal information
- Born: 1910 Puebla, Mexico
- Died: 11 November 2007 (aged 96–97)
- Height: 168 cm (5 ft 6 in)
- Weight: 63 kg (139 lb)

Sport
- Sport: Athletics
- Event: Marathon

Achievements and titles
- Personal best: 2:34:14 (1932)

Margarito Pomposo Barros (1910 – 11 November 2007) was a Mexican long-distance runner. He competed in the marathon at the 1932 Summer Olympics and finished 20th.
