= Ismael Mosqueira =

Mexican gymnast (1911–1966)

- Full name: Ismael Mosqueira Castelan
- Born: 1911 Mexico City, Mexico
- Died: 30 July 1996 (aged 84–85) Benito Juárez, Mexico City, Mexico

Gymnastics career
- Discipline: Men's artistic gymnastics
- Country represented: Mexico

Ismael Mosqueira Castelan (1911 – 30 July 1966) was a Mexican gymnast. He competed in two events at the 1932 Summer Olympics. At the 1946 Central American and Caribbean Games, Mosqueira won gold, silver and bronze, in the horizontal bar, team event and pommel horse respectively.
