= Giovanni Lattuada =

Italian artistic gymnast

- Born: 12 January 1905 Caronno Pertusella, Kingdom of Italy
- Died: 16 April 1984 (aged 79) Saronno, Italy
- Height: 1.67 m (5 ft 6 in)

Gymnastics career
- Discipline: Men's artistic gymnastics
- Country represented: Italy
Medal record
Men's artistic gymnastics
Representing Kingdom of Italy
Olympic Games
Bronze medal – third place	1932 Los Angeles	Rings

Giovanni Lattuada (January 12, 1905 – April 16, 1984) was an Italian artistic gymnast who competed in the 1932 Summer Olympics. He was born in Caronno Pertusella. In 1932 he won the bronze medal in the rings competition. He also participated in the horizontal bar event and finished twelfth.
