= Enrique Sánchez (athlete) =

Mexican sprinter

Personal information
- Born: 1909 Mexico City, Mexico

Sport
- Sport: Sprinting
- Event: 200 metres

Enrique Sánchez (born 1909, date of death unknown) was a Mexican sprinter. He competed in the men's 200 metres at the 1932 Summer Olympics.
