= Joseph Taylor (wrestler) =

British wrestler

Personal information
- Nationality: British
- Born: 18 November 1907 Bradford, England
- Died: December 1992 Bradford, England

Sport
- Sport: Wrestling

Joseph Taylor (18 November 1907 – December 1992) was an English wrestler. He competed in the men's freestyle featherweight at the 1932 Summer Olympics. He was the cousin of fellow Olympic Wrestler Jack Taylor, Father to Professional Wrestler Eric Taylor and Grandfather of Dave Taylor

Taylor was a five-times winner of the British Wrestling Championships in 1930, 1931, 1932, 1937 and 1947.
