= Kim Un-bae =

Korean marathon runner

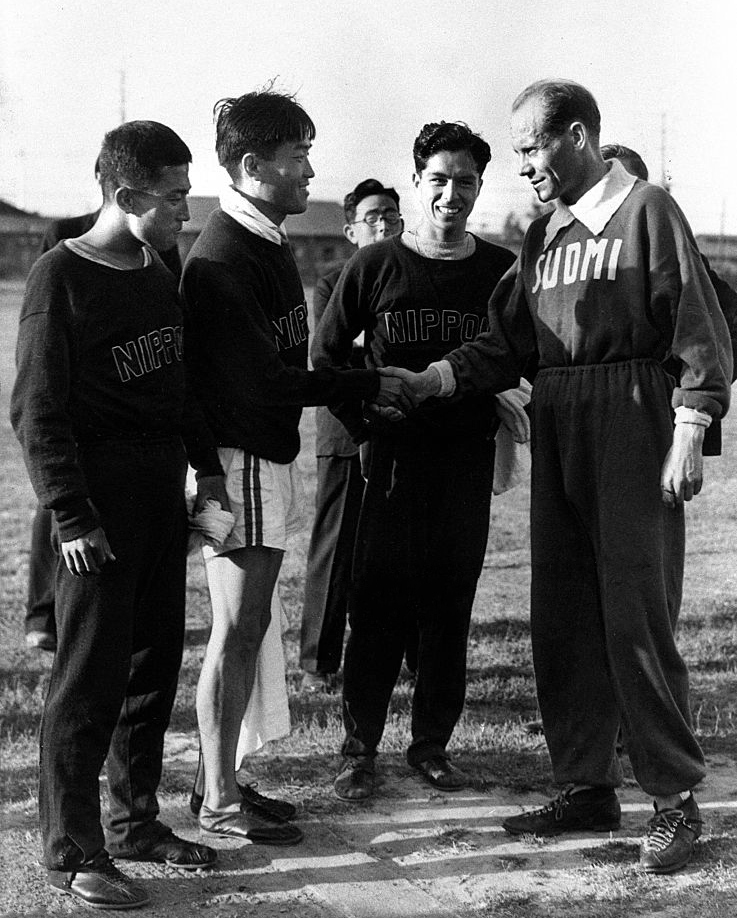
- Kim Un-bae (left) meets Paavo Nurmi (right) at the 1932 Olympics

Personal information
- Born: August 21, 1913 Seoul, South Korea
- Died: February 15, 1980 (aged 66) Incheon, South Korea
- Height: 1.63 m (5 ft 4 in)
- Weight: 52 kg (115 lb)

Sport
- Sport: Long-distance running

Kim Un-bae (Korean: 김은배; August 21, 1913 – February 15, 1980) was a Korean runner. He competed in the marathon at the 1932 Olympics and finished in sixth place.

He competed for Japan under his Japanese name Kin Onbai as Korea was part of the Japanese Empire at the time. The name is based on the Japanese kanji pronunciation of his Korean hanja name 金恩培.
