= Francisco Cabañas =

Mexican boxer (1912–2002)

Francisco Cabañas Pardo
Personal information
- Born: 22 January 1912 Mexico City, Mexico
- Died: 26 January 2002 (aged 90) Mexico City, Mexico

Boxing career

Boxing record
- Total fights: 2
- Win by KO: 1
- Losses: 1
Medal record
Men's Boxing at the Summer Olympics
Silver medal – second place	1932 Los Angeles	Flyweight

Francisco Cabañas Pardo (22 January 1912 – 26 January 2002) was a Mexican boxer. He competed in the flyweight class during the 1932 Summer Olympics and, although he lost the final against Hungarian István Énekes, he became the first Mexican athlete to ever win an individual Olympic medal.

== 1932 Olympic results ==
Below are the results of Francisco Cabanas, a flyweight boxer from Mexico, who competed at the 1932 Olympic boxing tournament in Los Angeles:

- Round of 16: bye
- Quarterfinal: defeated Ivan Duke (South Africa) on points
- Semifinal: defeated Thomas Pardoe (Great Britain) on points
- Final: lost to István Énekes (Hungary) on points (was awarded the silver medal)
