= Everardo Múzquiz =

Mexican sprinter

Personal information
- Nationality: Mexican
- Born: 31 January 1912
- Died: 7 February 1998 (aged 86)

Sport
- Sport: Sprinting
- Event: 200 metres

Everardo Múzquiz (31 January 1912 – 7 February 1998) was a Mexican sprinter. He competed in the men's 200 metres at the 1932 Summer Olympics.
