= Francesco Roccati =

Italian long-distance runner

Personal information
- Nationality: Italian
- Born: 9 June 1908 Turin, Italy
- Died: 22 July 1969 (aged 61)

Sport
- Sport: Long-distance running
- Event: Marathon

Francesco Roccati (9 June 1908 – 22 July 1969) was an Italian long-distance runner. He competed in the marathon at the 1932 Summer Olympics.
