= Noboru Sugimoto =

Japanese swimmer

Personal information
- Born: April 6, 1914 Kōchi Prefecture, Japan

Sport
- Sport: Swimming

Noboru Sugimoto (杉本 盛, Sugimoto Noboru; born 6 April 1914) is a Japanese freestyle swimmer who competed in the 1932 Summer Olympics. He was born in Kōchi Prefecture. In 1932 he finished fifth in the 100 metre freestyle event.
