= Eduardo Prieto =

Mexican fencer and sailor

Personal information
- Born: 15 May 1912 Mexico City, Mexico
- Died: 8 July 2003 (aged 91) Mexico City, Mexico

Sport
- Sport: Fencing, sailing

Eduardo Prieto (15 April 1912 – 8 July 2003) was a Mexican épée and foil fencer, and sailor. He competed at the 1932 Summer Olympics in four fencing events and at the 1964 Summer Olympics in sailing.
