= Santiago Hernández (athlete) =

Mexican long-distance runner

Personal information
- Nationality: Mexican

Sport
- Sport: Long-distance running
- Event: Marathon

Santiago Hernández was a Mexican long-distance runner. He competed in the marathon at the 1932 Summer Olympics.
