= Manuel Villegas (swimmer) =

Mexican swimmer

Personal information
- Born: 26 March 1907 Xalapa, Mexico

Sport
- Sport: Swimming

Manuel Villegas (born 26 March 1907, date of death unknown) was a Mexican swimmer. He competed in two events at the 1932 Summer Olympics.
