= Jean Chasson =

French wrestler

Personal information
- Nationality: French
- Born: 17 March 1907; Saint-Cloud, France

Sport
- Sport: Wrestling

Jean Chasson (17 March 1907 – 11 November 1993) was a French wrestler. He competed at the 1932 Summer Olympics and the 1936 Summer Olympics.
