= Ivan Duke =

South African boxer

Personal information
- Nationality: South African
- Born: 21 November 1913; Bethal, South Africa
- Died: 24 December 1991 (aged 78); Germiston, South Africa

Sport
- Sport: Boxing

Ivan Duke (21 November 1913 – 24 December 1991) was a South African boxer. He competed in the men's flyweight event at the 1932 Summer Olympics.
