= José Villanueva (boxer) =

Filipino boxer

Personal information
- Nickname: Cely
- Born: March 19, 1913 Binondo, Manila, Philippine Islands
- Died: November 11, 1983 (aged 70) Quezon City, Philippines

Sport
- Sport: Boxing
- Weight class: Bantamweight
- University team: FEU
Medal record
Men's Boxing
Representing the Philippines
Olympic Games
Bronze medal – third place	1932 Los Angeles	Bantamweight

José Luis "Cely" Villanueva (March 19, 1913 – November 11, 1983) was an amateur boxer from the Philippines who represented his country at the 1932 Los Angeles Olympics. Born in Binondo, Manila, he won the bronze medal in the bantamweight class after winning the fight for third place against Joseph Lang.

His son, Anthony Villanueva, also became a boxer, and won a silver medal during the 1964 Tokyo Olympics.

== Amateur career ==
At the 1932 Los Angeles Olympics, Villanueva claimed the Philippines its first Olympic medal in boxing. He gained a bye and bested Japan's Akira Nakao in the quarterfinals. However, his run was cut short after he fell to eventual gold medalist Horace Gwynne of Canada in their semifinal clash. He closed out his campaign with a victory over USA's Joseph Lang in the bronze medal match.

=== 1932 Olympic results ===
Below are the results of boxer José Villanueva who competed for the Philippines as a bantamweight at the 1932 Olympic boxing tournament in Los Angeles:

- Round of 16: bye
- Quarterfinal: defeated Akira Nakao (Japan) on points
- Semifinal: lost to Horace Gwynne (Canada) on points
- Bronze Medal Bout: won by walkover over Joseph Lang (USA)

== Professional career ==
After the 1932 Los Angeles Olympics, Villanueva turned pro. There are no records of how his professional boxing career went.

== Later life ==
Villanueva later on became a boxing trainer. One of his trained fighters was Gabriel Elorde who won a world 130-pound title and held it for seven years. His son, Anthony Villanueva, also became a boxer, and won a silver medal during the 1964 Tokyo Olympics. He was one of his son's first trainers. To this day, they are the only Filipino father-and-son duo to win Olympic medals. He also worked as a Malacañang employee until the early '70s.

== Death ==
Villanueva died of a heart attack on November 11, 1983.

== Legacy ==
In 2010, Villanueva and his son Anthony were inducted as part of the Philippine Sports Commission's first batch for their Hall of Fame. In 2021, they were inducted into Far Eastern University's Sports Hall of Fame.
