= Edelweis Rodriguez =

Italian boxer

Personal information
- Born: July 20, 1911 Rimini, Italy
- Died: February 22, 1962 (aged 50)
- Height: 1.53 m (5 ft 0 in)

Boxing career

Edelweis Rodriguez (July 20, 1911 – February 22, 1962) was an Italian boxer who competed in the 1932 Summer Olympics.

== Background ==
He was born in Rimini in Northern Italy and was known for his short stature but heavy fists, as well as a fantastic guard.

== Performances ==
Rodriguez placed third in the 1930 European Championships, boxing at the bantamweight class.

Participating as a flyweight in the 1932 Summer Olympics he was eliminated in the quarter-finals after losing his fight to the upcoming gold medalist István Énekes.
