= Vicente Mayagoitia =

Mexican gymnast

Gymnastics career
- Discipline: Men's artistic gymnastics
- Country represented: Mexico

Vicente Mayagoitia was a Mexican gymnast. He competed in two events at the 1932 Summer Olympics.
