= Ignacio Gutiérrez (swimmer) =

Mexican swimmer (1913–1976)

Personal information
- Born: 14 May 1913 Colima, Colima, Mexico
- Died: 4 April 1976 (aged 62)

Sport
- Sport: Swimming

Ignacio Gutiérrez (14 May 1913 – 4 April 1976) was a Mexican swimmer. He competed in two events at the 1932 Summer Olympics.
