= Joseph Lang =

American boxer

Joseph Ignatius Lang (February 4, 1911 – November 13, 1990) was an American boxer who had competed in the 1932 Summer Olympics. Lang was born in Lovelock, Nevada and died in Santa Clara, California. In 1932 he finished fourth in the bantamweight class. After losing in the semi-finals to Hans Ziglarski, he was unable to compete in the bronze medal competition against José Villanueva.

== 1932 Olympic results ==
Below is the record of Joseph Lang, an American bantamweight boxer who competed at the 1932 Los Angeles Olympics:

- Round of 16: defeated Sabino Tirado (Mexico) on points
- Quarterfinal: defeated Carlos Pereyra (Argentina) by walkover
- Semifinal: lost to Hans Ziglarski (Germany) on points
- Bronze Medal Bout: lost to José Villanueva (Philippines) by walkover
