= István Énekes =

Hungarian boxer (1911–1940)

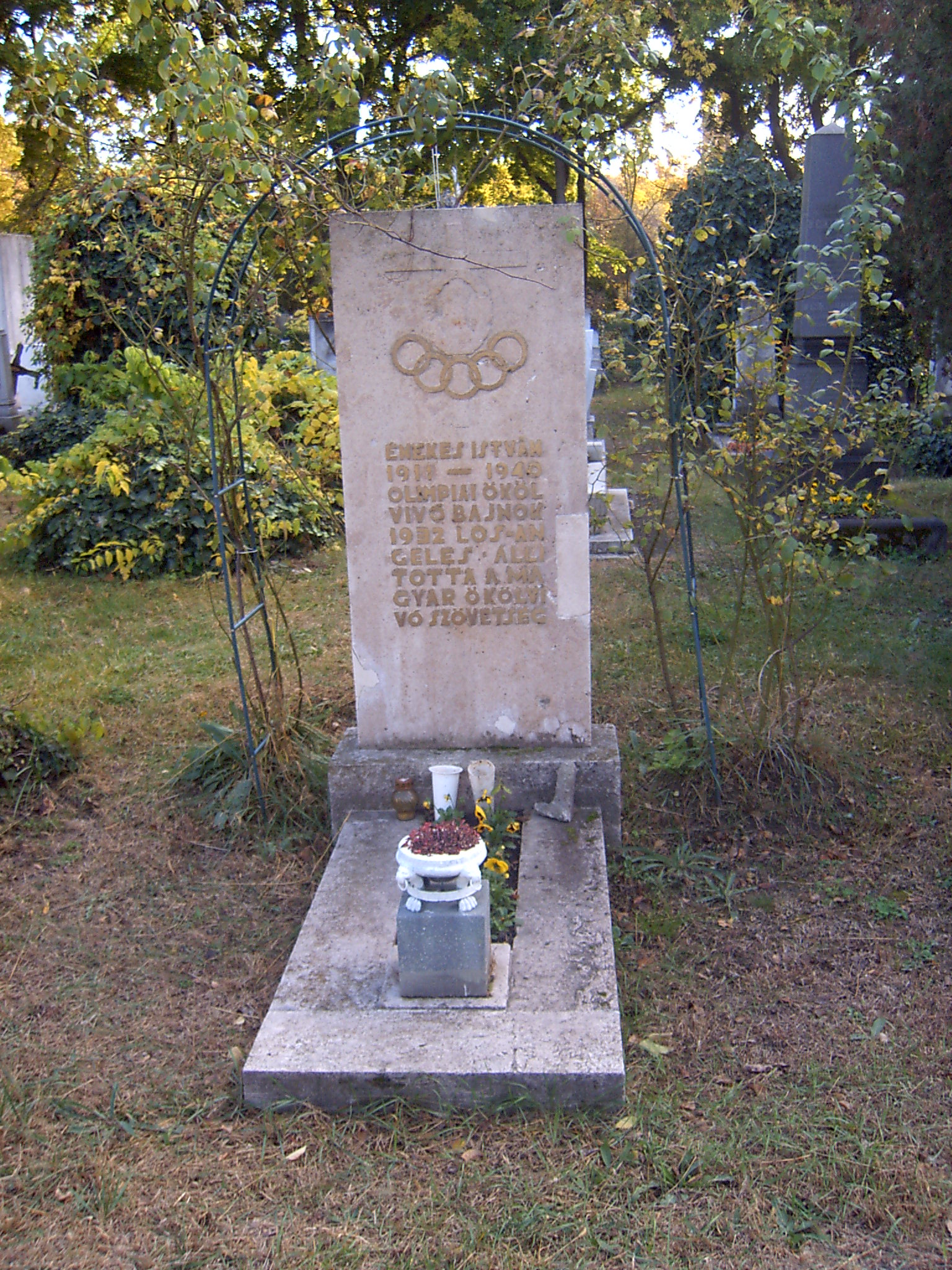
- István Énekes

Personal information
- Born: 20 February 1911 Budapest, Hungary
- Died: 2 January 1940 (aged 28) Budapest, Hungary

Boxing career

Olympic medal record

Men's amateur boxing

Representing Hungary

Olympic Games
Gold medal – first place	1932 Los Angeles	Flyweight

European Amateur Championships
Gold medal – first place	1930 Budapest	Flyweight

István Énekes (20 February 1911 – 2 January 1940) was a Hungarian boxer who competed in the 1932 Summer Olympics.

== Background ==
In 1932 he won the gold medal in the Flyweight class after winning the final against Francisco Cabañas of Mexico. He won twice the gold medal at the 1930 European Amateur Boxing Championships and 1934 European Amateur Boxing Championships, both in Budapest, respectively in the flyweight and bantamweight classes. He was born in and died in Budapest.

István was the elder brother of Vilmos Énekes.

== Olympic record ==
Below is the complete Olympic boxing record for István Énekes, who competed for Hungary in the flyweight division of the 1932 Olympic Games in Los Angeles:

- Round of 16: defeated Gaston Fayaud of France by decision
- Quarterfinal: defeated Edelweis Rodriguez of Italy by decision
- Semifinal: defeated Louis Salica of the United States by decision
- Final: defeated Francisco Cabañas of Mexico by decision (won gold medal)
