= Francisco José Álvarez =

Mexican gymnast

- Full name: Francisco José Álvarez Lezama
- Born: 5 May 1908 Tacuba, Mexico
- Height: 1.71 m (5 ft 7 in)
- Relatives: Francisco José Álvarez, Jr. (son)

Gymnastics career
- Discipline: Men's artistic gymnastics
- Country represented: Mexico

Francisco José Álvarez Lezama (5 May 1908 – died before 1987) was a Mexican gymnast. He competed in three events at the 1932 Summer Olympics.
