= Gymnastics at the 1968 Summer Olympics – Men's floor =

Men's floor exercise at the Games of the XIX Olympiad
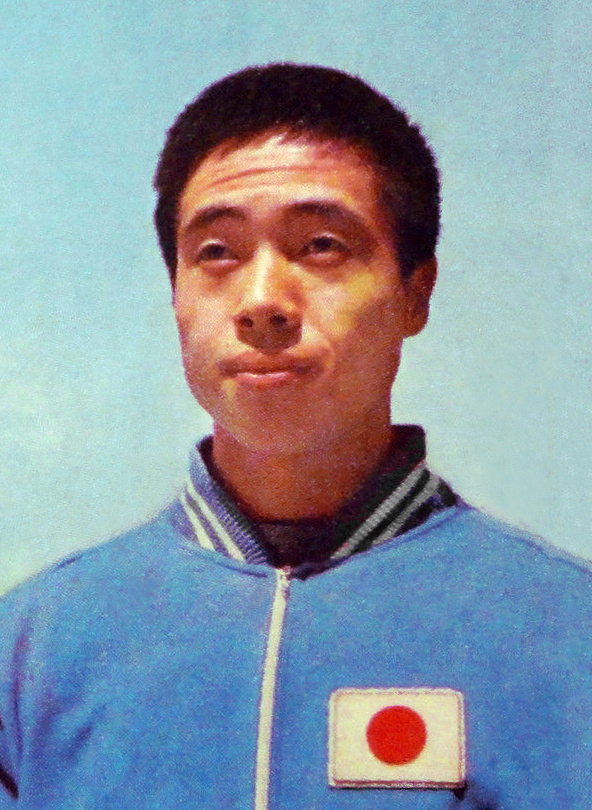
- Gold medalist Sawao Kato (1970)
- Venue: Auditorio Nacional
- Date: 22–26 October 1968
- Competitors: 117 from 28 nations
- Winning score: 19.475

Medalists
1st place, gold medalist(s)		Sawao Kato	Japan
2nd place, silver medalist(s)		Akinori Nakayama	Japan
3rd place, bronze medalist(s)		Takeshi Katō	Japan

These are the results of the men's floor competition, one of eight events for male competitors in artistic gymnastics at the 1968 Summer Olympics in Mexico City.

== Competition format ==
Each nation entered a team of six gymnasts or up to three individual gymnasts. All entrants in the gymnastics competitions performed both a compulsory exercise and a voluntary exercise for each apparatus. The scores for all 12 exercises were summed to give an individual all-around score.

These exercise scores were also used for qualification for the new apparatus finals. The two exercises (compulsory and voluntary) for each apparatus were summed to give an apparatus score; the top 6 in each apparatus participated in the finals; others were ranked 7th through 117th. In the final, each gymnast performed an additional voluntary exercise; half of the score from the preliminary carried over.

== Results ==
Rank	Gymnast	Nation	Preliminary			Final		
Rank	Gymnast	Nation	Compulsory	Voluntary	Total	1/2 Prelim.	Final	Total
1st place, gold medalist(s)	Sawao Kato	Japan	9.75	9.90	19.65	9.825	9.650	19.475
2nd place, silver medalist(s)	Akinori Nakayama	Japan	9.60	9.80	19.40	9.700	9.700	19.400
3rd place, bronze medalist(s)	Takeshi Katō	Japan	9.60	9.75	19.35	9.675	9.600	19.275
4	Mitsuo Tsukahara	Japan	9.50	9.60	19.10	9.550	9.500	19.050
5	Valery Karasyov	Soviet Union	9.55	9.55	19.10	9.550	9.400	18.950
6	Eizo Kenmotsu	Japan	9.55	9.70	19.25	9.625	9.300	18.925
7	Mikhail Voronin	Soviet Union	9.55	9.70	19.25	did not compete		
8	Viktor Lisitsky	Soviet Union	9.50	9.50	19.00	did not advance		
9	Sergey Diomidov	Soviet Union	9.50	9.45	18.95	did not advance		
9	Raycho Khristov	Bulgaria	9.35	9.60	18.95	did not advance		
11	Yukio Endo	Japan	9.15	9.65	18.80	did not advance		
11	Václav Kubíčka	Czechoslovakia	9.40	9.40	18.80	did not advance		
13	Viktor Klimenko	Soviet Union	9.25	9.50	18.75	did not advance		
14	František Bočko	Czechoslovakia	9.20	9.45	18.65	did not advance		
14	Miroslav Cerar	Yugoslavia	9.25	9.40	18.65	did not advance		
14	Sid Freudenstein	United States	9.15	9.50	18.65	did not advance		
14	Heiko Reinemer	West Germany	9.25	9.40	18.65	did not advance		
18	Siegfried Fülle	East Germany	9.15	9.45	18.60	did not advance		
18	Ivan Kondev	Bulgaria	9.10	9.50	18.60	did not advance		
18	Miloslav Netušil	Czechoslovakia	9.40	9.20	18.60	did not advance		
21	Klaus Köste	East Germany	9.20	9.35	18.55	did not advance		
21	Wilhelm Kubica	Poland	9.25	9.30	18.55	did not advance		
21	Václav Skoumal	Czechoslovakia	9.25	9.30	18.55	did not advance		
24	Matthias Brehme	East Germany	9.10	9.40	18.50	did not advance		
24	Mikołaj Kubica	Poland	9.20	9.30	18.50	did not advance		
26	Sylwester Kubica	Poland	9.30	9.15	18.45	did not advance		
26	Dave Thor	United States	9.15	9.30	18.45	did not advance		
28	Luigi Cimnaghi	Italy	9.10	9.30	18.40	did not advance		
28	Jiří Fejtek	Czechoslovakia	9.15	9.25	18.40	did not advance		
28	Bohumil Mudřík	Czechoslovakia	9.10	9.30	18.40	did not advance		
28	Jorge Rodríguez	Cuba	9.05	9.35	18.40	did not advance		
32	Fred Roethlisberger	United States	8.95	9.40	18.35	did not advance		
32	Heikki Sappinen	Finland	9.15	9.20	18.35	did not advance		
34	Kanati Allen	United States	9.10	9.20	18.30	did not advance		
34	Milenko Kersnić	Yugoslavia	9.20	9.10	18.30	did not advance		
34	Mauno Nissinen	Finland	9.20	9.10	18.30	did not advance		
37	Günter Beier	East Germany	9.00	9.20	18.20	did not advance		
37	Michel Bouchonnet	France	9.15	9.05	18.20	did not advance		
37	Christian Guiffroy	France	9.00	9.20	18.20	did not advance		
37	Peter Rohner	Switzerland	9.05	9.15	18.20	did not advance		
37	Arne Thomsen	Denmark	9.10	9.10	18.20	did not advance		
42	Heinz Häussler	West Germany	9.00	9.15	18.15	did not advance		
42	Steve Hug	United States	9.00	9.15	18.15	did not advance		
44	Gerhard Dietrich	East Germany	8.80	9.30	18.10	did not advance		
44	Endre Tihanyi	Hungary	9.10	9.00	18.10	did not advance		
46	Michael Booth	Great Britain	8.90	9.15	18.05	did not advance		
46	Janez Brodnik	Yugoslavia	9.05	9.00	18.05	did not advance		
46	Erich Hess	West Germany	9.00	9.05	18.05	did not advance		
46	Hermann Höpfner	West Germany	9.00	9.05	18.05	did not advance		
46	Christer Jönsson	Sweden	8.90	9.15	18.05	did not advance		
51	José Filipe Abreu	Portugal	8.80	9.20	18.00	did not advance		
51	Rumen Gabrovski	Bulgaria	8.90	9.10	18.00	did not advance		
51	Aleksander Rokosa	Poland	8.80	9.20	18.00	did not advance		
51	Helmut Tepasse	West Germany	9.00	9.00	18.00	did not advance		
55	Valery Ilyinykh	Soviet Union	9.10	8.85	17.95	did not advance		
55	Roberto Pumpido	Cuba	8.85	9.10	17.95	did not advance		
57	Meinrad Berchtold	Switzerland	8.95	8.95	17.90	did not advance		
57	Gilbert Larose	Canada	8.60	9.30	17.90	did not advance		
57	Peter Weber	East Germany	8.85	9.05	17.90	did not advance		
60	Jerzy Kruża	Poland	8.90	8.95	17.85	did not advance		
61	Andrzej Gonera	Poland	8.75	9.05	17.80	did not advance		
61	Sándor Kiss	Hungary	8.65	9.15	17.80	did not advance		
61	Juhani Rahikainen	Finland	8.80	9.00	17.80	did not advance		
61	Stefan Zoev	Bulgaria	8.65	9.15	17.80	did not advance		
65	Giovanni Carminucci	Italy	8.75	9.00	17.75	did not advance		
65	Chung-tae Kim	South Korea	8.85	8.90	17.75	did not advance		
65	Hans Peter Nielsen	Denmark	8.50	9.25	17.75	did not advance		
65	Stan Wild	Great Britain	8.60	9.15	17.75	did not advance		
69	Edwin Greutmann	Switzerland	8.75	8.95	17.70	did not advance		
69	Roland Hürzeler	Switzerland	8.80	8.90	17.70	did not advance		
71	Hans Ettlin	Switzerland	8.60	9.05	17.65	did not advance		
71	José González	Mexico	8.85	8.80	17.65	did not advance		
71	Reino Heino	Finland	8.85	8.80	17.65	did not advance		
71	Miloš Vratič	Yugoslavia	8.75	8.90	17.65	did not advance		
75	Damir Anić	Yugoslavia	8.50	9.10	17.60	did not advance		
75	Steve Cohen	United States	8.85	8.75	17.60	did not advance		
77	Finn Johannesson	Sweden	8.75	8.80	17.55	did not advance		
78	Luis Ramírez	Cuba	8.30	9.20	17.50	did not advance		
79	Paul Müller	Switzerland	8.65	8.80	17.45	did not advance		
80	Rogelio Mendoza	Mexico	8.30	9.10	17.40	did not advance		
80	Hannu Rantakari	Finland	8.60	8.80	17.40	did not advance		
82	Olli Laiho	Finland	8.60	8.75	17.35	did not advance		
83	Bozhidar Ivanov	Bulgaria	8.25	9.05	17.30	did not advance		
83	Larbi Lazhari	Algeria	8.45	8.85	17.30	did not advance		
85	Christian Deuza	France	8.30	8.95	17.25	did not advance		
86	Béla Herczeg	Hungary	8.45	8.75	17.20	did not advance		
87	Georgi Adamov	Bulgaria	8.20	8.90	17.10	did not advance		
88	István Aranyos	Hungary	8.35	8.70	17.05	did not advance		
88	Sid Jensen	Canada	8.10	8.95	17.05	did not advance		
90	Vincenzo Mori	Italy	8.20	8.70	16.90	did not advance		
91	Octavio Suárez	Cuba	8.05	8.80	16.85	did not advance		
92	Konrád Mentsik	Hungary	8.05	8.75	16.80	did not advance		
92	Armando Valles	Mexico	8.00	8.80	16.80	did not advance		
94	Enrique García	Mexico	8.10	8.65	16.75	did not advance		
95	Dezső Bordán	Hungary	7.90	8.80	16.70	did not advance		
96	Murray Chessell	Australia	7.95	8.65	16.60	did not advance		
97	Davaanyam Zagdbazaryn	Mongolia	8.30	8.20	16.50	did not advance		
98	Bruno Franceschetti	Italy	7.75	8.65	16.40	did not advance		
98	José Vilchis	Mexico	8.00	8.40	16.40	did not advance		
100	Pasquale Carminucci	Italy	7.65	8.65	16.30	did not advance		
100	Evert Lindgren	Sweden	7.55	8.75	16.30	did not advance		
102	Chu-Long Lai	Chinese Taipei	8.30	7.90	16.20	did not advance		
103	Tine Šrot	Yugoslavia	7.40	8.60	16.00	did not advance		
104	Barry Brooker	Canada	7.60	8.30	15.90	did not advance		
105	Roger Dion	Canada	7.60	8.25	15.85	did not advance		
106	Luis Navarrete	Cuba	7.00	8.80	15.80	did not advance		
106	Fernando Valles	Mexico	7.35	8.45	15.80	did not advance		
108	Fu Cheng	Chinese Taipei	7.70	8.05	15.75	did not advance		
109	Steve Mitruk	Canada	7.00	8.35	15.35	did not advance		
110	Eduardo Nájera	Ecuador	7.35	7.85	15.20	did not advance		
111	Sergio Luna	Ecuador	6.60	8.45	15.05	did not advance		
112	Pedro Rendón	Ecuador	6.25	7.50	13.75	did not advance		
113	Willi Jaschek	West Germany	9.15	2.00	11.15	did not advance		
114	Franco Menichelli	Italy	9.30	—	9.30	did not advance		
115	Héctor Ramírez	Cuba	9.05	—	9.05	did not advance		
116	Norman Henson	Philippines	7.70	—	7.70	did not advance		
117	Ernesto Beren	Philippines	6.10	—	6.10	did not advance		
