= Gymnastics at the 1968 Summer Olympics – Men's vault =

Olympic gymnastics event

Men's vault at the Games of the XIX Olympiad
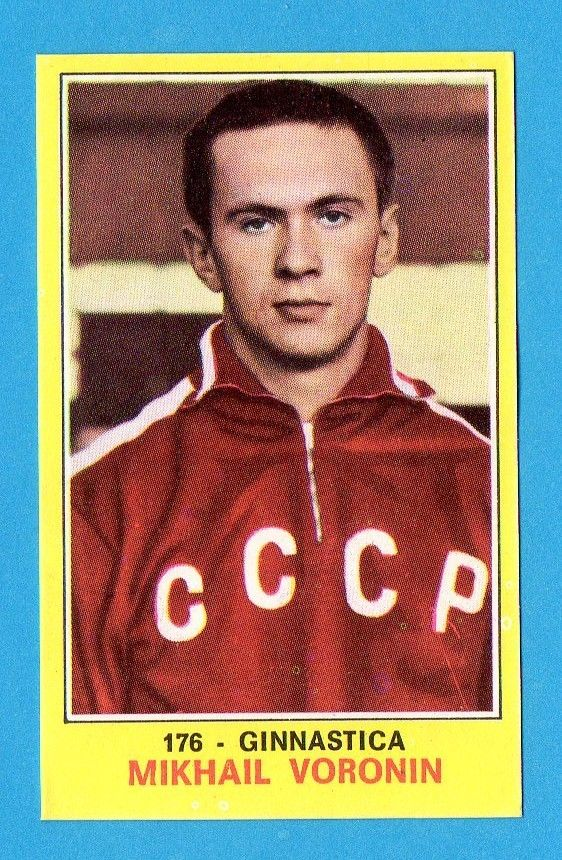
- Mikhail Voronin
- Venue: Auditorio Nacional
- Dates: 22–26 October 1968
- Competitors: 116 from 28 nations
- Winning score: 19.000

Medalists
1st place, gold medalist(s)		Mikhail Voronin	Soviet Union
2nd place, silver medalist(s)		Yukio Endo	Japan
3rd place, bronze medalist(s)		Sergei Diomidov	Soviet Union

The men's vault competition was one of eight events for male competitors in artistic gymnastics at the 1968 Summer Olympics in Mexico City. The event was held from 22 to 26 October at the Auditorio Nacional. There were 116 competitors from 28 nations, with nations in the team competition having up to 6 gymnasts and other nations entering up to 3 gymnasts. The event was won by Mikhail Voronin of the Soviet Union, the nation's fourth gold medal in the vault. Yukio Endo of Japan took silver, while Soviet Sergei Diomidov earned bronze.

== Background ==
This was the 12th appearance of the event, which is one of the five apparatus events held every time there were apparatus events at the Summer Olympics (no apparatus events were held in 1900, 1908, 1912, or 1920). Three of the six finalists from 1964 returned: silver medalist Victor Lisitsky of the Soviet Union, bronze medalist Hannu Rantakari of Finland, and sixth-place finisher Yukio Endo of Japan. Reigning gold medalist and world champion Haruhiro Yamashita of Japan did not compete.

Ecuador made its debut in the men's vault; East and West Germany competed separately for the first time. The United States made its 11th appearance, most of any nation, having missed only the inaugural 1896 Games.

== Competition format ==
Each nation entered a team of six gymnasts or up to three individual gymnasts. All entrants in the gymnastics competitions performed both a compulsory exercise and a voluntary exercise for each apparatus. The scores for all 12 exercises were summed to give an individual all-around score. (One gymnast who entered the all-around competition did not perform on the vault.)

The event used a "vaulting horse" aligned parallel to the gymnast's run (rather than the modern "vaulting table" in use since 2004). These exercise scores were also used for qualification for the new apparatus finals. The two exercises (compulsory and voluntary) for each apparatus were summed to give an apparatus score; the top 6 in each apparatus participated in the finals; others were ranked 7th through 116th. In the final, each gymnast performed an additional voluntary exercise; half of the score from the preliminary carried over.

== Schedule ==
All times are Central Standard Time (UTC-6)

Date	Time	Round
Tuesday, 22 October 1968	8:30; 17:00	Preliminary: Compulsory
Thursday, 24 October 1968	8:30; 17:00	Preliminary: Voluntary
Saturday, 26 October 1968	19:00	Final

== Results ==
Rank	Gymnast	Nation	Preliminary			Final		
Rank	Gymnast	Nation	Compulsory	Voluntary	Total	1/2 Prelim.	Final	Total
1st place, gold medalist(s)	Mikhail Voronin	Soviet Union	9.45	9.55	19.00	9.500	9.500	19.000
2nd place, silver medalist(s)	Yukio Endo	Japan	9.35	9.65	19.00	9.500	9.450	18.950
3rd place, bronze medalist(s)	Sergey Diomidov	Soviet Union	9.45	9.45	18.90	9.450	9.475	18.925
4	Takeshi Katō	Japan	9.45	9.60	19.05	9.525	9.250	18.775
5	Akinori Nakayama	Japan	9.45	9.40	18.85	9.425	9.300	18.725
6	Eizo Kenmotsu	Japan	9.40	9.55	18.95	9.475	9.175	18.650
7	Sawao Kato	Japan	9.35	9.55	18.90	did not compete		
8	Valery Karasyov	Soviet Union	9.40	9.45	18.85	did not advance		
8	Viktor Klimenko	Soviet Union	9.45	9.40	18.85	did not advance		
10	Siegfried Fülle	East Germany	9.35	9.45	18.80	did not advance		
10	Viktor Lisitsky	Soviet Union	9.40	9.40	18.80	did not advance		
12	Valery Ilyinykh	Soviet Union	9.30	9.45	18.75	did not advance		
13	Mikołaj Kubica	Poland	9.30	9.40	18.70	did not advance		
14	Matthias Brehme	East Germany	9.20	9.45	18.65	did not advance		
15	Günter Beier	East Germany	9.30	9.30	18.60	did not advance		
15	Janez Brodnik	Yugoslavia	9.25	9.35	18.60	did not advance		
15	Miroslav Cerar	Yugoslavia	9.20	9.40	18.60	did not advance		
18	Meinrad Berchtold	Switzerland	9.20	9.35	18.55	did not advance		
18	František Bočko	Czechoslovakia	9.25	9.30	18.55	did not advance		
18	Wilhelm Kubica	Poland	9.25	9.30	18.55	did not advance		
18	Václav Kubíčka	Czechoslovakia	9.30	9.25	18.55	did not advance		
18	Bohumil Mudřík	Czechoslovakia	9.25	9.30	18.55	did not advance		
23	Jiří Fejtek	Czechoslovakia	9.10	9.40	18.50	did not advance		
23	Dave Thor	United States	9.10	9.40	18.50	did not advance		
23	Miloš Vratič	Yugoslavia	9.20	9.30	18.50	did not advance		
23	Peter Weber	East Germany	9.20	9.30	18.50	did not advance		
27	Václav Skoumal	Czechoslovakia	9.20	9.25	18.45	did not advance		
27	Helmut Tepasse	West Germany	9.05	9.40	18.45	did not advance		
27	Mitsuo Tsukahara	Japan	9.05	9.40	18.45	did not advance		
30	Georgi Adamov	Bulgaria	9.20	9.20	18.40	did not advance		
30	Christian Guiffroy	France	9.10	9.30	18.40	did not advance		
30	Christer Jönsson	Sweden	9.10	9.30	18.40	did not advance		
30	Milenko Kersnić	Yugoslavia	9.10	9.30	18.40	did not advance		
30	Klaus Köste	East Germany	9.15	9.25	18.40	did not advance		
30	Fred Roethlisberger	United States	9.25	9.15	18.40	did not advance		
30	Aleksander Rokosa	Poland	9.20	9.20	18.40	did not advance		
37	Hans Ettlin	Switzerland	9.10	9.25	18.35	did not advance		
37	Evert Lindgren	Sweden	9.15	9.20	18.35	did not advance		
37	Heiko Reinemer	West Germany	9.00	9.35	18.35	did not advance		
37	Armando Valles	Mexico	9.15	9.20	18.35	did not advance		
41	Gilbert Larose	Canada	9.10	9.20	18.30	did not advance		
41	Tine Šrot	Yugoslavia	9.05	9.25	18.30	did not advance		
43	István Aranyos	Hungary	9.05	9.20	18.25	did not advance		
43	Andrzej Gonera	Poland	8.90	9.35	18.25	did not advance		
43	Erich Hess	West Germany	9.00	9.25	18.25	did not advance		
43	Ivan Kondev	Bulgaria	9.15	9.10	18.25	did not advance		
43	Stan Wild	Great Britain	9.10	9.15	18.25	did not advance		
43	Stefan Zoev	Bulgaria	9.10	9.15	18.25	did not advance		
49	Sid Jensen	Canada	8.85	9.35	18.20	did not advance		
49	Sándor Kiss	Hungary	9.05	9.15	18.20	did not advance		
49	Vincenzo Mori	Italy	9.15	9.05	18.20	did not advance		
49	Juhani Rahikainen	Finland	9.00	9.20	18.20	did not advance		
49	Endre Tihanyi	Hungary	9.15	9.05	18.20	did not advance		
54	Kanati Allen	United States	9.00	9.15	18.15	did not advance		
54	Rumen Gabrovski	Bulgaria	9.10	9.05	18.15	did not advance		
54	Finn Johannesson	Sweden	9.05	9.10	18.15	did not advance		
54	Raycho Khristov	Bulgaria	8.95	9.20	18.15	did not advance		
54	Jerzy Kruża	Poland	9.00	9.15	18.15	did not advance		
54	Olli Laiho	Finland	9.15	9.00	18.15	did not advance		
60	Luigi Cimnaghi	Italy	9.15	8.95	18.10	did not advance		
60	Hermann Höpfner	West Germany	8.95	9.15	18.10	did not advance		
60	Miloslav Netušil	Czechoslovakia	8.95	9.15	18.10	did not advance		
63	Sid Freudenstein	United States	9.10	8.95	18.05	did not advance		
63	Sylwester Kubica	Poland	8.75	9.30	18.05	did not advance		
63	Jorge Rodríguez	Cuba	8.95	9.10	18.05	did not advance		
63	Peter Rohner	Switzerland	8.75	9.30	18.05	did not advance		
63	Heikki Sappinen	Finland	8.90	9.15	18.05	did not advance		
68	Steve Cohen	United States	8.95	9.05	18.00	did not advance		
68	Gerhard Dietrich	East Germany	9.00	9.00	18.00	did not advance		
68	Fernando Valles	Mexico	8.85	9.15	18.00	did not advance		
71	José Filipe Abreu	Portugal	9.25	8.70	17.95	did not advance		
71	Michel Bouchonnet	France	8.80	9.15	17.95	did not advance		
71	Hans Peter Nielsen	Denmark	8.95	9.00	17.95	did not advance		
71	Mauno Nissinen	Finland	8.95	9.00	17.95	did not advance		
75	Damir Anić	Yugoslavia	8.85	9.05	17.90	did not advance		
75	Dezső Bordán	Hungary	9.05	8.85	17.90	did not advance		
75	Roland Hürzeler	Switzerland	8.80	9.10	17.90	did not advance		
78	Michael Booth	Great Britain	8.90	8.95	17.85	did not advance		
78	Christian Deuza	France	8.75	9.10	17.85	did not advance		
78	José González	Mexico	9.00	8.85	17.85	did not advance		
78	Béla Herczeg	Hungary	8.80	9.05	17.85	did not advance		
78	Hannu Rantakari	Finland	9.05	8.80	17.85	did not advance		
83	Heinz Häussler	West Germany	8.85	8.95	17.80	did not advance		
83	Steve Hug	United States	8.75	9.05	17.80	did not advance		
85	Giovanni Carminucci	Italy	9.05	8.70	17.75	did not advance		
85	Bruno Franceschetti	Italy	8.80	8.95	17.75	did not advance		
87	Edwin Greutmann	Switzerland	8.65	9.05	17.70	did not advance		
87	Reino Heino	Finland	8.90	8.80	17.70	did not advance		
87	Bozhidar Ivanov	Bulgaria	8.80	8.90	17.70	did not advance		
87	Roberto Pumpido	Cuba	8.70	9.00	17.70	did not advance		
87	Héctor Ramírez	Cuba	8.85	8.85	17.70	did not advance		
92	Barry Brooker	Canada	8.90	8.75	17.65	did not advance		
92	Chung-tae Kim	South Korea	9.00	8.65	17.65	did not advance		
94	Roger Dion	Canada	8.55	9.05	17.60	did not advance		
94	Luis Navarrete	Cuba	8.40	9.20	17.60	did not advance		
96	Paul Müller	Switzerland	8.45	9.10	17.55	did not advance		
96	Octavio Suárez	Cuba	8.40	9.15	17.55	did not advance		
98	Rogelio Mendoza	Mexico	8.20	9.30	17.50	did not advance		
99	Larbi Lazhari	Algeria	8.55	8.90	17.45	did not advance		
99	Steve Mitruk	Canada	8.95	8.50	17.45	did not advance		
99	Luis Ramírez	Cuba	8.60	8.85	17.45	did not advance		
102	José Vilchis	Mexico	8.60	8.80	17.40	did not advance		
102	Davaanyam Zagdbazaryn	Mongolia	8.75	8.65	17.40	did not advance		
104	Pasquale Carminucci	Italy	8.75	8.60	17.35	did not advance		
105	Murray Chessell	Australia	8.40	8.75	17.15	did not advance		
106	Sergio Luna	Ecuador	8.35	8.70	17.05	did not advance		
106	Konrád Mentsik	Hungary	8.15	8.90	17.05	did not advance		
108	Chu-Long Lai	Taiwan	8.60	8.40	17.00	did not advance		
109	Enrique García	Mexico	8.10	8.65	16.75	did not advance		
110	Fu Cheng	Taiwan	8.60	8.00	16.60	did not advance		
111	Arne Thomsen	Denmark	9.00	7.00	16.00	did not advance		
112	Pedro Rendón	Ecuador	6.75	7.15	13.90	did not advance		
113	Franco Menichelli	Italy	9.30	—	9.30	did not advance		
114	Willi Jaschek	West Germany	9.10	—	9.10	did not advance		
115	Norman Henson	Philippines	8.40	—	8.40	did not advance		
116	Eduardo Nájera	Ecuador	—	8.05	8.05	did not advance		
