= Gymnastics at the 1968 Summer Olympics – Men's parallel bars =

Olympic gymnastics event

Men's parallel bars at the Games of the XIX Olympiad
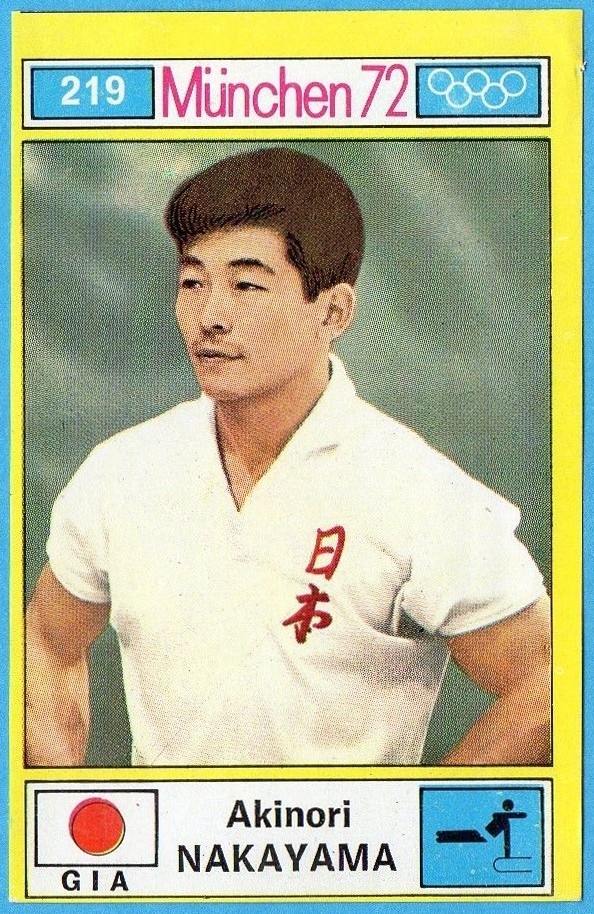
- Akinori Nakayama
- Venue: Auditorio Nacional
- Date: 22–26 October 1968
- Competitors: 117 from 28 nations
- Winning score: 19.475

Medalists
1st place, gold medalist(s)		Akinori Nakayama; Japan
2nd place, silver medalist(s)		Mikhail Voronin; Soviet Union
3rd place, bronze medalist(s)		Viktor Klimenko; Soviet Union

The men's parallel bars competition was one of eight events for male competitors in artistic gymnastics at the 1968 Summer Olympics in Mexico City. There were 117 competitors from 28 nations, with nations in the team competition having up to 6 gymnasts and other nations entering up to 3 gymnasts. The event was won by Akinori Nakayama of Japan, the nation's second consecutive victory in the parallel bars event, tying Germany and the Soviet Union for second-most all-time behind Switzerland at three gold medals. It was the second of four straight Games that the parallel bars would be won by a Japanese gymnast. Mikhail Voronin took silver and Viktor Klimenko took bronze to put the Soviet Union back on the podium after a one-Games absence.

== Background ==
This was the 12th appearance of the event, which is one of the five apparatus events held every time there were apparatus events at the Summer Olympics (no apparatus events were held in 1900, 1908, 1912, or 1920). Five of the six finalists from 1964 returned: gold medalist Yukio Endo of Japan, bronze medalist Franco Menichelli of Italy, fourth-place finisher Sergey Diomidov and fifth-place finisher Victor Lisitsky of the Soviet Union, and sixth-place finisher Miroslav Cerar of Yugoslavia. Diomidov had won the 1966 world championship, with fellow Soviet Mikhail Voronin second and Cerar third.

Ecuador and the Philippines each made their debut in the men's parallel bars; East and West Germany competed separately for the first time. The United States made its 11th appearance, most of any nation, having missed only the inaugural 1896 Games.

== Competition format ==
Each nation entered a team of six gymnasts or up to three individual gymnasts. All entrants in the gymnastics competitions performed both a compulsory exercise and a voluntary exercise for each apparatus. The scores for all 12 exercises were summed to give an individual all-around score.

These exercise scores were also used for qualification for the new apparatus finals. The two exercises (compulsory and voluntary) for each apparatus were summed to give an apparatus score; the top 6 in each apparatus participated in the finals; others were ranked 7th through 117th. In the final, each gymnast performed an additional voluntary exercise; half of the score from the preliminary carried over.

== Schedule ==
All times are Central Standard Time (UTC-6)

Date	Time	Round
Tuesday, 22 October 1968	8:30; 17:00	Preliminary: Compulsory
Thursday, 24 October 1968	8:30; 17:00	Preliminary: Voluntary
Saturday, 26 October 1968	19:00	Final

== Results ==
Rank	Gymnast	Nation	Preliminary			Final		
Rank	Gymnast	Nation	Compulsory	Voluntary	Total	1/2 Prelim.	Final	Total
1st place, gold medalist(s)	Akinori Nakayama	Japan	9.70	9.85	19.55	9.775	9.700	19.475
2nd place, silver medalist(s)	Mikhail Voronin	Soviet Union	9.75	9.70	19.45	9.725	9.700	19.425
3rd place, bronze medalist(s)	Viktor Klimenko	Soviet Union	9.60	9.65	19.25	9.625	9.600	19.225
4	Takeshi Katō	Japan	9.60	9.70	19.30	9.650	9.550	19.200
5	Eizo Kenmotsu	Japan	9.60	9.65	19.25	9.625	9.550	19.175
6	Václav Kubíčka	Czechoslovakia	9.60	9.60	19.20	9.600	9.350	18.950
7	Sawao Kato	Japan	9.65	9.70	19.35	did not compete		
8	Christian Guiffroy	France	9.55	9.65	19.20	did not advance		
9	Yukio Endo	Japan	9.65	9.50	19.15	did not advance		
9	Valery Karasyov	Soviet Union	9.55	9.60	19.15	did not advance		
9	Wilhelm Kubica	Poland	9.50	9.65	19.15	did not advance		
12	Matthias Brehme	East Germany	9.60	9.50	19.10	did not advance		
12	Miroslav Cerar	Yugoslavia	9.60	9.50	19.10	did not advance		
12	Roland Hürzeler	Switzerland	9.50	9.60	19.10	did not advance		
15	Hans Ettlin	Switzerland	9.55	9.50	19.05	did not advance		
15	Mikołaj Kubica	Poland	9.45	9.60	19.05	did not advance		
15	Olli Laiho	Finland	9.50	9.55	19.05	did not advance		
15	Miloslav Netušil	Czechoslovakia	9.45	9.60	19.05	did not advance		
19	Milenko Kersnić	Yugoslavia	9.50	9.50	19.00	did not advance		
19	Mauno Nissinen	Finland	9.40	9.60	19.00	did not advance		
21	Valery Ilyinykh	Soviet Union	9.50	9.45	18.95	did not advance		
21	Peter Weber	East Germany	9.50	9.45	18.95	did not advance		
23	Meinrad Berchtold	Switzerland	9.45	9.45	18.90	did not advance		
23	Sergey Diomidov	Soviet Union	9.45	9.45	18.90	did not advance		
23	Helmut Tepasse	West Germany	9.45	9.45	18.90	did not advance		
26	Giovanni Carminucci	Italy	9.45	9.40	18.85	did not advance		
26	Siegfried Fülle	East Germany	9.40	9.45	18.85	did not advance		
26	Willi Jaschek	West Germany	9.35	9.50	18.85	did not advance		
26	Konrád Mentsik	Hungary	9.35	9.50	18.85	did not advance		
26	Bohumil Mudřík	Czechoslovakia	9.35	9.50	18.85	did not advance		
31	Georgi Adamov	Bulgaria	9.35	9.45	18.80	did not advance		
31	Dezső Bordán	Hungary	9.30	9.50	18.80	did not advance		
33	Sándor Kiss	Hungary	9.40	9.35	18.75	did not advance		
33	Klaus Köste	East Germany	9.45	9.30	18.75	did not advance		
35	František Bočko	Czechoslovakia	9.30	9.40	18.70	did not advance		
35	Christian Deuza	France	9.30	9.40	18.70	did not advance		
35	Sylwester Kubica	Poland	9.30	9.40	18.70	did not advance		
35	Peter Rohner	Switzerland	9.30	9.40	18.70	did not advance		
39	Janez Brodnik	Yugoslavia	9.30	9.35	18.65	did not advance		
39	Christer Jönsson	Sweden	9.20	9.45	18.65	did not advance		
41	Steve Cohen	United States	9.10	9.50	18.60	did not advance		
41	Viktor Lisitsky	Soviet Union	9.60	9.00	18.60	did not advance		
41	Fred Roethlisberger	United States	9.10	9.50	18.60	did not advance		
41	Václav Skoumal	Czechoslovakia	9.30	9.30	18.60	did not advance		
45	Andrzej Gonera	Poland	9.05	9.50	18.55	did not advance		
45	Béla Herczeg	Hungary	9.25	9.30	18.55	did not advance		
45	Paul Müller	Switzerland	9.30	9.25	18.55	did not advance		
45	Juhani Rahikainen	Finland	9.30	9.25	18.55	did not advance		
49	Chung-tae Kim	South Korea	9.05	9.45	18.50	did not advance		
49	Heiko Reinemer	West Germany	9.20	9.30	18.50	did not advance		
51	István Aranyos	Hungary	9.25	9.20	18.45	did not advance		
51	Günter Beier	East Germany	9.10	9.35	18.45	did not advance		
51	Luigi Cimnaghi	Italy	9.30	9.15	18.45	did not advance		
51	Steve Hug	United States	9.05	9.40	18.45	did not advance		
55	Pasquale Carminucci	Italy	9.20	9.20	18.40	did not advance		
55	Aleksander Rokosa	Poland	9.15	9.25	18.40	did not advance		
57	Edwin Greutmann	Switzerland	9.10	9.25	18.35	did not advance		
57	Bozhidar Ivanov	Bulgaria	9.10	9.25	18.35	did not advance		
57	Hannu Rantakari	Finland	9.15	9.20	18.35	did not advance		
60	Bruno Franceschetti	Italy	9.15	9.15	18.30	did not advance		
60	Heinz Häussler	West Germany	9.20	9.10	18.30	did not advance		
60	Hermann Höpfner	West Germany	9.10	9.20	18.30	did not advance		
63	Sid Freudenstein	United States	8.85	9.40	18.25	did not advance		
63	Miloš Vratič	Yugoslavia	8.90	9.35	18.25	did not advance		
65	Evert Lindgren	Sweden	8.75	9.45	18.20	did not advance		
65	Hans Peter Nielsen	Denmark	9.00	9.20	18.20	did not advance		
67	Heikki Sappinen	Finland	9.05	9.10	18.15	did not advance		
67	Endre Tihanyi	Hungary	9.10	9.05	18.15	did not advance		
69	Jiří Fejtek	Czechoslovakia	8.60	9.50	18.10	did not advance		
69	Reino Heino	Finland	9.00	9.10	18.10	did not advance		
69	Jerzy Kruża	Poland	8.95	9.15	18.10	did not advance		
72	Gerhard Dietrich	East Germany	8.70	9.35	18.05	did not advance		
73	Dave Thor	United States	8.70	9.30	18.00	did not advance		
74	Rumen Gabrovski	Bulgaria	8.95	9.00	17.95	did not advance		
74	Finn Johannesson	Sweden	8.95	9.00	17.95	did not advance		
74	Mitsuo Tsukahara	Japan	8.35	9.60	17.95	did not advance		
74	Stefan Zoev	Bulgaria	9.10	8.85	17.95	did not advance		
78	Arne Thomsen	Denmark	9.15	8.75	17.90	did not advance		
79	Damir Anić	Yugoslavia	8.85	9.00	17.85	did not advance		
79	Ivan Kondev	Bulgaria	8.85	9.00	17.85	did not advance		
81	Michel Bouchonnet	France	8.55	9.25	17.80	did not advance		
81	Stan Wild	Great Britain	9.10	8.70	17.80	did not advance		
83	José González	Mexico	9.00	8.70	17.70	did not advance		
83	Roberto Pumpido	Cuba	8.70	9.00	17.70	did not advance		
85	Michael Booth	Great Britain	8.70	8.95	17.65	did not advance		
85	Raycho Khristov	Bulgaria	8.50	9.15	17.65	did not advance		
85	Rogelio Mendoza	Mexico	8.90	8.75	17.65	did not advance		
88	José Filipe Abreu	Portugal	8.65	8.95	17.60	did not advance		
89	Armando Valles	Mexico	8.70	8.85	17.55	did not advance		
90	Sid Jensen	Canada	9.05	8.35	17.40	did not advance		
90	Gilbert Larose	Canada	8.20	9.20	17.40	did not advance		
90	Tine Šrot	Yugoslavia	8.20	9.20	17.40	did not advance		
93	Vincenzo Mori	Italy	8.95	8.40	17.35	did not advance		
94	Erich Hess	West Germany	8.85	8.45	17.30	did not advance		
95	Luis Ramírez	Cuba	8.55	8.65	17.20	did not advance		
95	Octavio Suárez	Cuba	8.00	9.20	17.20	did not advance		
97	Steve Mitruk	Canada	8.35	8.80	17.15	did not advance		
98	Jorge Rodríguez	Cuba	8.95	8.15	17.10	did not advance		
99	Davaanyam Zagdbazaryn	Mongolia	8.50	8.50	17.00	did not advance		
100	Enrique García	Mexico	8.00	8.90	16.90	did not advance		
101	Roger Dion	Canada	7.70	9.10	16.80	did not advance		
102	Kanati Allen	United States	7.70	9.05	16.75	did not advance		
102	Larbi Lazhari	Algeria	9.00	7.75	16.75	did not advance		
104	José Vilchis	Mexico	8.00	8.70	16.70	did not advance		
105	Sergio Luna	Ecuador	7.70	8.95	16.65	did not advance		
106	Fu Cheng	Taiwan	8.55	8.05	16.60	did not advance		
107	Héctor Ramírez	Cuba	8.00	8.55	16.55	did not advance		
108	Murray Chessell	Australia	7.55	8.90	16.45	did not advance		
109	Chu-Long Lai	Taiwan	8.70	7.70	16.40	did not advance		
110	Luis Navarrete	Cuba	7.40	8.60	16.00	did not advance		
111	Fernando Valles	Mexico	7.20	8.45	15.65	did not advance		
112	Barry Brooker	Canada	7.20	8.05	15.25	did not advance		
113	Pedro Rendón	Ecuador	5.70	7.55	13.25	did not advance		
114	Eduardo Nájera	Ecuador	5.50	7.20	12.70	did not advance		
115	Franco Menichelli	Italy	9.60	—	9.60	did not advance		
116	Ernesto Beren	Philippines	6.65	—	6.65	did not advance		
117	Norman Henson	Philippines	4.95	—	4.95	did not advance		
