= Gymnastics at the 1968 Summer Olympics – Men's artistic individual all-around =

Olympic gymnastics event

Men's artistic individual all-around at the Games of the XIX Olympiad
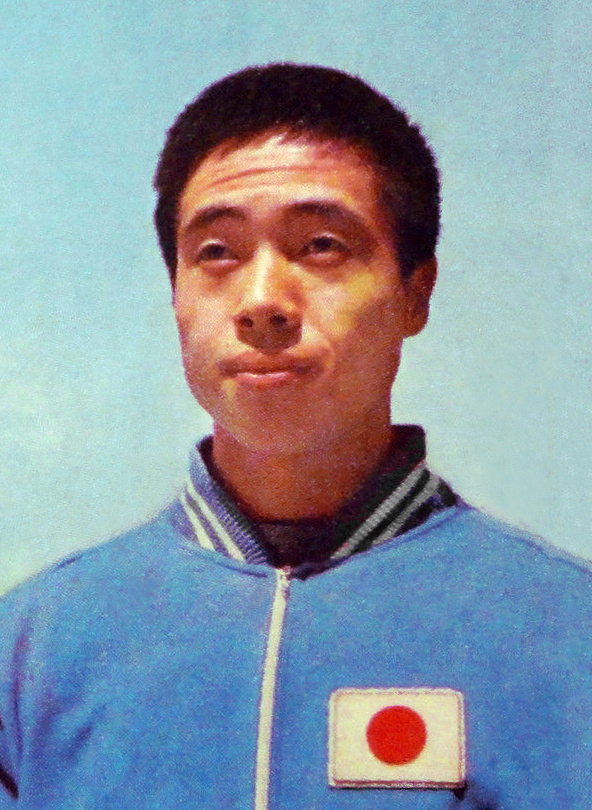
- Gold medalist Sawao Kato (1970)
- Venue: Auditorio Nacional
- Dates: 22–24 October 1968
- Competitors: 117 from 28 nations
- Winning score: 115.90

Medalists
1st place, gold medalist(s)		Sawao Kato; Japan
2nd place, silver medalist(s)		Mikhail Voronin; Soviet Union
3rd place, bronze medalist(s)		Akinori Nakayama; Japan

The men's individual all-around competition was one of eight events for male competitors in artistic gymnastics at the 1968 Summer Olympics in Mexico City. It was held on 22 and 24 October at the Auditorio Nacional. There were 117 competitors from 28 nations. Each nation entered a team of six gymnasts or up to three individual gymnasts. The event was won by Sawao Kato of Japan, the nation's second consecutive victory in the event. Kato's teammate Akinori Nakayama took bronze. Mikhail Voronin of the Soviet Union took silver. It was the fifth consecutive Games with a Soviet gymnast on the podium in the men's all-around and the fourth consecutive Games with a Japanese gymnast there; no gymnast from any other nation medaled in the men's all-around from 1956 to 1976. In 1960 and 1964, the two nations had taken 8 of the top 10 places both Games, with Yugoslavia's Miroslav Cerar and Italy's Franco Menichelli the only two breaking up the Japanese–Soviet dominance; this time, Menichelli did not finish all exercises and Cerar was the only person from outside the Soviet Union or Japan in the top 10 as those two nations took 9 of the top 10 places in the event.

== Background ==
This was the 15th appearance of the men's individual all-around. The first individual all-around competition had been held in 1900, after the 1896 competitions featured only individual apparatus events. A men's individual all-around has been held every Games since 1900.

Four of the top 10 gymnasts from the 1964 Games returned: gold medalist Yukio Endo of Japan, silver medalist Viktor Lisitsky of the Soviet Union, fifth-place finisher Franco Menichelli of Italy, and seventh-place finisher Miroslav Cerar of Yugoslavia. Endo, Cerar, and Menichelli had all been in the top 10 in 1960 as well. Soviet gymnast Mikhail Voronin was the reigning (1966) World Champion, with Japan's Shuji Tsurumi and Akinori Nakayama finishing second and third.

Ecuador made its debut in the event. East and West Germany competed separately for the first time. France and Italy both made their 13th appearance, tied for most among nations.

== Competition format ==
All entrants in the gymnastics competitions performed both a compulsory exercise and a voluntary exercise for each apparatus. The scores for all 12 exercises were summed to give an individual all-around score.

These exercise scores were also used for qualification for the new apparatus finals. The two exercises (compulsory and voluntary) for each apparatus were summed to give an apparatus score; the top 6 in each apparatus participated in the finals; others were ranked 7th through 117th. There was no all-around final.

Exercise scores ranged from 0 to 10, apparatus scores from 0 to 20, and individual totals from 0 to 120.

== Schedule ==
All times are Central Standard Time (UTC-6)

Date	Time	Round
Tuesday, 22 October 1968	8:30; 17:00	Preliminary: Compulsory
Thursday, 24 October 1968	8:30; 17:00	Preliminary: Voluntary

== Results ==
Rank	Gymnast	Nation	Apparatus results																								Total
Rank	Gymnast	Nation	Floor (gymnastics)				Pommel horse				Rings (gymnastics)				Vault (gymnastics)				Parallel bars				Horizontal bar				Total
Rank	Gymnast	Nation	C	V	Score	Rank	C	V	Score	Rank	C	V	Score	Rank	C	V	Score	Rank	C	V	Score	Rank	C	V	Score	Rank	Total
1st place, gold medalist(s)	Sawao Katō	Japan	9.75	9.90	19.65	1	9.45	9.55	19.00	8	9.70	9.85	19.55	1	9.35	9.55	18.90	5	9.65	9.70	19.35	3	9.60	9.85	19.45	3	115.90
2nd place, silver medalist(s)	Mikhail Voronin	Soviet Union	9.55	9.70	19.25	4	9.70	9.50	19.20	2	9.75	9.70	19.45	3	9.45	9.55	19.00	2	9.75	9.70	19.45	2	9.70	9.80	19.50	1	115.85
3rd place, bronze medalist(s)	Akinori Nakayama	Japan	9.60	9.80	19.40	2	9.40	9.45	18.85	12	9.75	9.75	19.50	2	9.45	9.40	18.85	7	9.70	9.85	19.55	1	9.70	9.80	19.50	1	115.65
4	Eizo Kenmotsu	Japan	9.55	9.70	19.25	4	9.45	9.65	19.10	4	9.55	9.45	19.00	7	9.40	9.55	18.95	4	9.60	9.65	19.25	5	9.55	9.80	19.35	5	114.90
5	Takeshi Katō	Japan	9.60	9.75	19.35	3	9.20	9.45	18.65	20	9.70	9.70	19.40	4	9.45	9.60	19.05	1	9.60	9.70	19.30	4	9.55	9.55	19.10	11	114.85
6	Sergey Diomidov	Soviet Union	9.50	9.45	18.95	9	9.50	9.50	19.00	8	9.60	9.45	19.05	6	9.45	9.45	18.90	5	9.45	9.45	18.90	23	9.60	9.70	19.30	6	114.10
7	Viktor Klimenko	Soviet Union	9.25	9.50	18.75	13	9.50	9.60	19.10	4	9.40	9.50	18.90	9	9.45	9.40	18.85	7	9.60	9.65	19.25	5	9.50	9.60	19.10	11	113.95
8	Yukio Endō	Japan	9.15	9.65	18.80	11	9.20	9.20	18.40	26	9.45	9.50	18.95	8	9.35	9.65	19.00	2	9.65	9.50	19.15	9	9.55	9.70	19.25	7	113.55
9	Miroslav Cerar	Yugoslavia	9.25	9.40	18.65	14	9.65	9.70	19.35	1	9.30	9.40	18.70	15	9.20	9.40	18.60	15	9.60	9.50	19.10	12	9.55	9.35	18.90	19	113.30
10	Valery Karasyov	Soviet Union	9.55	9.55	19.10	6	9.35	9.50	18.85	12	9.45	9.15	18.60	17	9.40	9.45	18.85	7	9.55	9.60	19.15	9	9.40	9.30	18.70	33	113.25
11	Wilhelm Kubica	Poland	9.25	9.30	18.55	21	9.60	9.50	19.10	4	9.30	9.30	18.60	17	9.25	9.30	18.55	18	9.50	9.65	19.15	9	9.50	9.70	19.20	8	113.15
12	Matthias Brehme	East Germany	9.10	9.40	18.50	24	9.50	9.25	18.75	18	9.30	9.40	18.70	15	9.20	9.45	18.65	14	9.60	9.50	19.10	12	9.55	9.60	19.15	10	112.85
13	Mikołaj Kubica	Poland	9.20	9.30	18.50	24	9.45	9.55	19.00	8	9.30	9.45	18.75	13	9.30	9.40	18.70	13	9.45	9.60	19.05	15	9.20	9.60	18.80	25	112.80
14	Viktor Lisitsky	Soviet Union	9.50	9.50	19.00	8	9.30	9.30	18.60	22	9.40	9.40	18.80	11	9.40	9.40	18.80	10	9.60	9.00	18.60	41	9.35	9.45	18.80	25	112.60
15	Valery Ilyinykh	Soviet Union	9.10	8.85	17.95	55	9.05	9.40	18.45	25	9.30	9.30	18.60	17	9.30	9.45	18.75	12	9.50	9.45	18.95	21	9.50	9.70	19.20	8	111.90
16	Klaus Köste	East Germany	9.20	9.35	18.55	21	9.25	8.65	17.90	45	9.40	9.40	18.80	11	9.15	9.25	18.40	30	9.45	9.30	18.75	33	9.75	9.70	19.45	3	111.85
17	Mauno Nissinen	Finland	9.20	9.10	18.30	34	9.40	9.45	18.85	12	9.30	9.25	18.55	20	8.95	9.00	17.95	71	9.40	9.60	19.00	19	9.45	9.50	18.95	17	111.60
18	Mitsuo Tsukahara	Japan	9.50	9.60	19.10	6	9.40	8.25	17.65	53	9.65	9.60	19.25	5	9.05	9.40	18.45	27	8.35	9.60	17.95	74	9.50	9.60	19.10	11	111.50
19	Václav Kubíčka	Czechoslovakia	9.40	9.40	18.80	11	8.90	9.00	17.90	45	9.00	9.30	18.30	28	9.30	9.25	18.55	18	9.60	9.60	19.20	7	9.15	9.40	18.55	42	111.30
20	Jiří Fejtek	Czechoslovakia	9.15	9.25	18.40	28	9.40	9.60	19.00	8	9.35	9.40	18.75	13	9.10	9.40	18.50	23	8.60	9.50	18.10	69	9.15	9.30	18.45	47	111.20
21	Siegfried Fülle	East Germany	9.15	9.45	18.60	18	9.05	8.25	17.30	71	9.05	9.40	18.45	23	9.35	9.45	18.80	10	9.40	9.45	18.85	26	9.55	9.55	19.10	11	111.10
22	František Bočko	Czechoslovakia	9.20	9.45	18.65	14	8.90	9.40	18.30	33	8.95	9.20	18.15	38	9.25	9.30	18.55	18	9.30	9.40	18.70	35	9.25	9.40	18.65	34	111.00
23	Janez Brodnik	Yugoslavia	9.05	9.00	18.05	46	8.85	9.15	18.00	41	9.20	9.30	18.50	22	9.25	9.35	18.60	15	9.30	9.35	18.65	39	9.45	9.50	18.95	17	110.75
24	Dave Thor	United States	9.15	9.30	18.45	26	9.50	9.60	19.10	4	9.00	9.00	18.00	47	9.10	9.40	18.50	23	8.70	9.30	18.00	74	9.05	9.50	18.55	42	110.60
25	Meinrad Berchtold	Switzerland	8.95	8.95	17.90	57	8.90	9.35	18.25	36	8.95	9.20	18.15	38	9.20	9.35	18.55	18	9.45	9.45	18.90	23	9.40	9.35	18.75	29	110.50
26	Peter Weber	East Germany	8.85	9.05	17.90	57	8.75	8.95	17.70	52	9.00	9.30	18.30	28	9.20	9.30	18.50	23	9.50	9.45	18.95	21	9.40	9.40	18.80	25	110.15
27	Christian Guiffroy	France	9.00	9.20	18.20	37	9.05	8.60	17.65	53	8.60	8.95	17.55	68	9.10	9.30	18.40	30	9.55	9.65	19.20	7	9.50	9.50	19.00	15	110.00
28	Bohumil Mudřík	Czechoslovakia	9.10	9.30	18.40	28	9.10	9.25	18.35	29	8.25	9.10	17.35	77	9.25	9.30	18.55	18	9.35	9.50	18.85	26	9.05	9.40	18.45	47	109.95
29	Hans Ettlin	Switzerland	8.60	9.05	17.65	71	8.95	8.50	17.45	65	9.20	9.35	18.55	20	9.10	9.25	18.35	37	9.55	9.50	19.05	15	9.40	9.45	18.85	23	109.90
30	Milenko Kersnić	Yugoslavia	9.20	9.10	18.30	34	8.85	8.80	17.65	53	9.05	9.10	18.15	38	9.10	9.30	18.40	30	9.50	9.50	19.00	19	9.05	9.30	18.35	55	109.85
31	Sylwester Kubica	Poland	9.30	9.15	18.45	26	9.00	9.40	18.40	26	8.75	9.05	17.80	58	8.75	9.30	18.05	63	9.30	9.40	18.70	35	9.40	9.00	18.40	52	109.80
32	Peter Rohner	Switzerland	9.05	9.15	18.20	37	9.10	9.30	18.40	26	8.90	8.95	17.85	54	8.75	9.30	18.05	63	9.30	9.40	18.70	35	9.25	9.35	18.60	39	109.80
33	Luigi Cimnaghi	Italy	9.10	9.30	18.40	28	9.10	8.85	17.95	42	9.05	9.05	18.10	43	9.15	8.95	18.10	60	9.30	9.15	18.45	51	9.35	9.40	18.75	29	109.75
34	Fred Roethlisberger	United States	8.95	9.40	18.35	32	8.85	8.70	17.55	58	9.15	9.20	18.35	27	9.25	9.15	18.40	30	9.10	9.50	18.60	41	9.10	9.35	18.45	47	109.70
34	Gerhard Dietrich	East Germany	8.80	9.30	18.10	44	9.15	9.50	18.65	20	8.85	9.20	18.05	44	9.00	9.00	18.00	68	8.70	9.35	18.05	72	9.30	9.55	18.85	23	109.70
36	Steve Hug	United States	9.00	9.15	18.15	42	9.30	9.40	18.70	19	8.80	9.10	17.90	52	8.75	9.05	17.80	83	9.05	9.40	18.45	51	9.25	9.35	18.60	39	109.60
37	Miloslav Netušil	Czechoslovakia	9.40	9.20	18.60	18	9.30	9.55	18.85	12	9.10	8.95	18.05	44	8.95	9.15	18.10	60	9.45	9.60	19.05	15	7.50	9.25	16.75	101	109.40
38	Václav Skoumal	Czechoslovakia	9.25	9.30	18.55	21	7.90	8.85	16.75	85	8.95	8.95	17.90	52	9.20	9.25	18.45	27	9.30	9.30	18.60	41	9.45	9.55	19.00	15	109.25
39	Andrzej Gonera	Poland	8.75	9.05	17.80	61	8.85	9.10	17.95	42	9.00	9.30	18.30	28	8.90	9.35	18.25	43	9.05	9.50	18.55	45	9.15	9.25	18.40	52	109.25
40	Heikki Sappinen	Finland	9.15	9.20	18.35	32	8.60	9.20	17.80	48	9.20	9.25	18.45	23	8.90	9.15	18.05	63	9.05	9.10	18.15	67	8.90	9.35	18.25	58	109.05
41	Olli Laiho	Finland	8.60	8.75	17.35	82	9.45	9.70	19.15	3	8.00	9.20	17.20	81	9.15	9.00	18.15	54	9.50	9.55	19.05	15	8.65	9.40	18.05	69	108.95
42	Miloš Vratič	Yugoslavia	8.75	8.90	17.65	71	8.95	9.40	18.35	29	8.75	8.90	17.65	63	9.20	9.30	18.50	23	8.90	9.35	18.25	63	9.20	9.30	18.50	45	108.90
42	Chung-tae Kim	South Korea	8.85	8.90	17.75	65	9.15	9.35	18.50	24	8.85	9.00	17.85	54	9.00	8.65	17.65	92	9.05	9.45	18.50	49	9.20	9.45	18.65	34	108.90
44	Aleksander Rokosa	Poland	8.80	9.20	18.00	51	8.55	9.00	17.55	58	9.05	9.20	18.25	32	9.20	9.20	18.40	30	9.15	9.25	18.40	55	8.80	9.45	18.25	59	108.85
45	Heinz Häussler	West Germany	9.00	9.15	18.15	42	9.30	9.50	18.80	16	8.65	8.90	17.55	68	8.85	8.95	17.80	83	9.20	9.10	18.30	60	9.05	9.15	18.20	62	108.80
46	Steve Cohen	United States	8.85	8.75	17.60	75	9.00	8.35	17.35	67	9.30	9.60	18.90	9	8.95	9.05	18.00	68	9.10	9.50	18.60	41	8.90	9.40	18.30	56	108.75
47	Christer Jönsson	Sweden	8.90	9.15	18.05	46	8.85	7.90	16.75	85	8.90	9.05	17.95	51	9.10	9.30	18.40	30	9.20	9.45	18.65	39	9.50	9.40	18.90	19	108.70
48	Juhani Rahikainen	Finland	8.80	9.00	17.80	61	9.00	8.90	17.90	45	8.95	9.05	18.00	47	9.00	9.20	18.20	49	9.30	9.25	18.55	45	8.95	9.20	18.15	66	108.60
49	Roland Hürzeler	Switzerland	8.80	8.90	17.70	69	9.30	9.05	18.35	29	8.50	9.05	17.55	68	8.80	9.10	17.90	75	9.50	9.60	19.10	12	8.40	9.45	17.85	75	108.45
50	Helmut Tepasse	West Germany	9.00	9.00	18.00	51	7.70	9.10	16.80	83	8.45	9.30	17.75	60	9.05	9.40	18.45	27	9.45	9.45	18.90	23	9.35	9.10	18.45	47	108.35
51	Günter Beier	East Germany	9.00	9.20	18.20	37	8.75	8.00	16.75	85	8.45	9.10	17.55	68	9.30	9.30	18.60	15	9.10	9.35	18.45	51	9.40	9.25	18.65	34	108.20
52	Heiko Reinemer	West Germany	9.25	9.40	18.65	14	7.00	8.80	15.80	102	8.85	9.40	18.25	32	9.00	9.35	18.35	37	9.20	9.30	18.50	49	9.20	9.45	18.65	34	108.20
53	Jerzy Kruża	Poland	8.90	8.95	17.85	60	9.00	9.10	18.10	39	8.90	8.80	17.70	60	9.00	9.15	18.15	54	8.95	9.15	18.10	69	8.90	9.35	18.25	59	108.15
53	Michel Bouchonnet	France	9.15	9.05	18.20	37	9.10	9.25	18.35	29	8.65	8.60	17.25	79	8.80	9.15	17.95	71	8.55	9.25	17.80	81	9.20	9.40	18.60	39	108.15
55	Hermann Höpfner	West Germany	9.00	9.05	18.05	46	8.80	9.00	17.80	48	8.45	9.10	17.55	68	8.95	9.15	18.10	60	9.10	9.20	18.30	60	9.20	9.10	18.30	56	108.10
56	Giovanni Carminucci	Italy	8.75	9.00	17.75	65	8.95	9.35	18.30	33	8.75	8.90	17.65	63	9.05	8.70	17.75	85	9.45	9.40	18.85	26	9.30	8.45	17.75	81	108.05
57	Sid Freudenstein	United States	9.15	9.50	18.65	14	8.75	7.85	16.60	93	8.90	9.15	18.05	44	9.10	8.95	18.05	63	8.85	9.40	18.25	63	8.95	9.45	18.40	53	108.00
58	Georgi Adamov	Bulgaria	8.20	8.90	17.10	87	9.05	8.20	17.25	73	8.80	8.85	17.65	63	9.20	9.20	18.40	30	9.35	9.45	18.80	31	9.50	9.15	18.65	34	107.85
59	Paul Müller	Switzerland	8.65	8.80	17.45	79	9.25	9.35	18.60	22	8.85	9.00	17.85	54	8.45	9.10	17.55	96	9.30	9.25	18.55	45	9.00	8.80	17.80	76	107.80
60	Erich Hess	West Germany	9.00	9.05	18.05	46	8.85	8.25	17.10	81	8.90	9.25	18.15	38	9.00	9.25	18.25	43	8.85	8.45	17.30	94	9.55	9.35	18.90	19	107.75
61	Endre Tihanyi	Hungary	9.10	9.00	18.10	44	8.65	8.55	17.20	76	8.80	9.20	18.00	47	9.15	9.05	18.20	49	9.10	9.05	18.15	67	8.80	9.15	17.95	72	107.60
62	Raycho Khristov	Bulgaria	9.35	9.60	18.95	9	8.40	8.80	17.20	76	8.10	8.60	16.70	91	8.95	9.20	18.15	54	8.50	9.15	17.65	85	9.50	9.40	18.90	19	107.55
63	Hans Peter Nielsen	Denmark	8.50	9.25	17.75	65	9.00	9.30	18.30	33	8.80	9.05	17.85	54	8.95	9.00	17.95	71	9.00	9.20	18.20	65	8.30	9.00	17.30	95	107.35
64	Gilbert Larose	Canada	8.60	9.30	17.90	57	8.90	9.05	17.95	42	9.00	9.30	18.30	28	9.10	9.20	18.30	41	8.20	9.20	17.40	90	8.80	8.60	17.40	92	107.25
65	Christian Deuza	France	8.30	8.95	17.25	85	9.00	8.35	17.35	67	8.90	8.60	17.50	75	8.75	9.10	17.85	78	9.30	9.40	18.70	35	9.20	9.30	18.50	45	107.15
66	István Aranyos	Hungary	8.35	8.70	17.05	88	8.65	8.70	17.35	67	8.70	9.00	17.70	60	9.05	9.20	18.25	43	9.25	9.20	18.45	51	8.90	9.30	18.20	62	107.00
67	Reino Heino	Finland	8.85	8.80	17.65	71	8.80	8.80	17.60	57	9.00	9.15	18.15	38	8.90	8.80	17.70	87	9.00	9.10	18.10	69	8.40	9.30	17.70	85	106.90
68	Stefan Zoev	Bulgaria	8.65	9.15	17.80	61	9.35	8.00	17.35	67	8.65	8.70	17.35	77	9.10	9.15	18.25	43	9.10	8.85	17.95	74	9.25	8.90	18.15	66	106.85
68	Ivan Kondev	Bulgaria	9.10	9.50	18.60	18	8.80	8.85	17.65	53	8.60	8.15	16.75	89	9.15	9.10	18.25	43	8.85	9.00	17.85	79	8.75	9.00	17.75	81	106.85
70	Edwin Greutmann	Switzerland	8.75	8.95	17.70	69	8.60	8.60	17.20	76	8.70	8.90	17.60	67	8.65	9.05	17.70	87	9.10	9.25	18.35	57	9.05	9.10	18.15	66	106.70
71	Armando Valles	Mexico	8.00	8.80	16.80	92	9.05	9.10	18.15	38	9.05	9.20	18.25	32	9.15	9.20	18.35	37	8.70	8.85	17.55	89	9.30	8.00	17.30	95	106.40
71	Finn Johannesson	Sweden	8.75	8.80	17.55	77	8.55	8.60	17.15	80	9.10	9.15	18.25	32	9.05	9.10	18.15	54	8.95	9.00	17.95	74	7.95	9.40	17.35	94	106.40
73	Bruno Franceschetti	Italy	7.75	8.65	16.40	98	9.00	9.25	18.25	37	8.80	9.00	17.80	58	8.80	8.95	17.75	85	9.15	9.15	18.30	60	8.70	9.10	17.80	76	106.30
73	Hannu Rantakari	Finland	8.60	8.80	17.40	80	8.35	8.35	16.70	89	9.10	9.15	18.25	32	9.05	8.80	17.85	78	9.15	9.20	18.35	57	8.25	9.50	17.75	29	106.30
75	Damir Anić	Yugoslavia	8.50	9.10	17.60	75	8.35	9.15	17.50	63	8.25	8.90	17.15	82	8.85	9.05	17.90	75	8.85	9.00	17.85	79	8.80	9.00	17.80	76	105.80
76	Evert Lindgren	Sweden	7.55	8.75	16.30	100	8.75	9.35	18.10	39	7.85	8.80	16.65	93	9.15	9.20	18.35	37	8.75	9.45	18.20	65	8.70	9.35	18.05	69	105.65
77	Sándor Kiss	Hungary	8.65	9.15	17.80	61	8.75	8.55	17.30	71	6.90	8.95	15.85	103	9.05	9.15	18.20	49	9.40	9.35	18.75	33	8.60	9.10	17.70	85	105.60
77	Sid Jensen	Canada	8.10	8.95	17.05	88	8.70	8.00	16.70	89	9.05	9.20	18.25	32	8.85	9.35	18.20	49	9.05	8.35	17.40	90	8.80	9.20	18.00	71	105.60
79	Stan Wild	Great Britain	8.60	9.15	17.75	65	8.70	9.10	17.80	48	8.45	8.20	16.65	93	9.10	9.15	18.25	43	9.10	8.70	17.80	81	8.50	8.75	17.25	97	105.50
80	Kanati Allen	United States	9.10	9.20	18.30	34	9.00	8.55	17.55	58	7.80	8.50	16.30	99	9.00	9.15	18.15	54	7.70	9.05	16.75	102	8.80	9.50	18.40	56	105.45
81	Dezső Bordán	Hungary	7.90	8.80	16.70	95	8.80	8.65	17.45	65	7.95	7.80	15.75	104	9.05	8.85	17.90	75	9.30	9.50	18.80	31	9.05	9.40	18.45	47	105.05
82	José Filipe Abreu	Portugal	8.80	9.20	18.00	51	8.40	8.10	16.50	94	8.95	9.05	18.00	47	9.25	8.70	17.95	71	8.65	8.95	17.60	88	8.40	8.50	16.90	99	104.95
83	Rumen Gabrovski	Bulgaria	8.90	9.10	18.00	51	8.40	8.00	16.40	95	8.60	8.95	17.55	68	9.10	9.05	18.15	54	8.95	9.00	17.95	74	9.10	7.75	16.85	100	104.90
84	Tine Šrot	Yugoslavia	7.40	8.60	16.00	103	8.60	8.65	17.25	73	9.20	9.20	18.40	25	9.05	9.25	18.30	41	8.20	9.20	17.40	90	8.40	9.05	17.45	90	104.80
84	Pasquale Carminucci	Italy	7.65	8.65	16.30	100	8.70	9.05	17.75	51	8.70	8.55	17.25	79	8.75	8.60	17.35	104	9.20	9.20	18.40	55	8.80	8.95	17.75	81	104.80
86	Jorge Rodríguez	Cuba	9.05	9.35	18.40	28	7.70	8.40	16.10	99	8.25	8.90	17.15	82	8.95	9.10	18.05	63	8.95	8.15	17.10	98	8.75	9.20	17.95	72	104.75
87	Konrád Mentsik	Hungary	8.05	8.75	16.80	92	7.50	8.60	16.10	99	8.35	8.75	17.10	84	8.15	8.90	17.05	106	9.35	9.50	18.85	26	9.30	9.50	18.80	25	104.70
88	Béla Herczeg	Hungary	8.45	8.75	17.20	86	8.75	7.60	16.35	97	7.20	8.85	16.05	101	8.80	9.05	17.85	78	9.25	9.30	18.55	45	9.15	9.40	18.55	42	104.55
89	Rogelio Mendoza	Mexico	8.30	9.10	17.40	80	8.15	9.05	17.20	76	8.15	8.70	16.85	88	8.20	9.30	17.50	98	8.90	8.75	17.65	85	8.80	9.00	17.80	75	104.40
90	Arne Thomsen	Denmark	9.10	9.10	18.20	37	7.70	9.05	16.75	85	8.10	8.90	17.00	87	9.00	7.00	16.00	111	9.15	8.75	17.90	78	9.00	9.20	18.20	62	104.05
91	Michael Booth	Great Britain	8.90	9.15	18.05	46	8.40	8.40	16.80	83	7.85	7.70	15.55	106	8.90	8.95	17.85	78	8.70	8.95	17.65	85	8.75	9.00	17.75	81	103.65
92	Bozhidar Ivanov	Bulgaria	8.25	9.05	17.30	83	7.70	8.70	16.40	95	8.65	8.45	17.10	84	8.80	8.90	17.70	87	9.10	9.25	18.35	57	7.50	9.15	16.65	105	103.50
92	Octavio Suárez	Cuba	8.05	8.80	16.85	91	8.65	7.90	17.55	58	8.80	8.85	17.65	63	8.40	9.15	17.55	96	8.00	9.20	17.20	95	7.50	9.20	16.70	104	103.50
94	Vincenzo Mori	Italy	8.20	8.70	16.90	90	8.70	8.85	17.55	58	8.50	8.00	16.50	95	9.15	9.05	18.20	49	8.95	8.40	17.35	93	8.45	8.10	16.55	107	103.05
95	Roberto Pumpido	Cuba	8.85	9.10	17.95	55	6.85	7.80	14.65	105	7.85	8.40	16.25	100	8.70	9.00	17.70	87	8.70	9.00	17.70	83	8.65	8.75	17.40	92	101.65
96	Steve Mitruk	Canada	7.00	8.35	15.35	109	8.75	8.75	17.50	63	8.10	8.40	16.50	95	8.95	8.50	17.45	99	8.35	8.80	17.15	97	8.70	8.75	17.45	90	101.40
97	José Vilchis	Mexico	8.00	8.40	16.40	98	7.80	7.70	15.50	103	8.55	9.00	17.55	68	8.60	8.80	17.40	102	8.00	8.70	16.70	104	8.85	8.80	17.65	88	101.20
98	Davaanyam Zagdbazaryn	Mongolia	8.30	8.20	16.50	97	8.45	8.25	16.70	89	8.90	8.15	17.05	86	8.75	8.65	17.40	102	8.50	8.50	17.00	99	8.50	8.00	16.50	108	101.15
99	José González	Mexico	8.85	8.80	17.65	71	8.20	6.45	14.65	105	7.45	8.10	15.55	106	9.00	8.85	17.85	78	9.00	8.70	17.70	83	8.85	8.75	17.60	89	101.00
100	Luis Ramírez	Cuba	8.30	9.20	17.50	78	6.75	7.80	14.55	107	8.55	8.95	17.50	75	8.60	8.85	17.45	99	8.55	8.65	17.20	95	7.80	8.95	16.75	101	100.95
101	Enrique García	Mexico	8.10	8.65	16.75	94	7.55	8.40	15.95	101	7.60	8.35	15.95	102	8.10	8.65	16.75	109	8.00	8.90	16.90	100	8.65	9.05	17.70	85	100.00
102	Murray Chessell	Australia	7.95	8.65	16.60	96	8.40	8.25	16.25	92	8.20	8.55	16.75	89	8.40	8.75	17.15	105	7.55	8.90	16.45	108	8.05	8.25	16.30	110	99.50
103	Roger Dion	Canada	7.60	8.25	15.85	105	8.55	8.45	17.00	82	6.15	8.25	14.40	109	8.55	9.05	17.60	94	7.70	9.10	16.80	101	8.95	8.85	17.80	76	99.45
104	Fernando Valles	Mexico	7.35	8.45	15.80	106	8.90	8.35	17.25	73	7.75	7.85	15.60	105	8.85	9.15	18.00	68	7.20	8.45	15.65	111	8.35	8.40	16.75	101	99.05
105	Larbi Lazhari	Algeria	8.45	8.85	17.30	83	6.65	7.00	13.65	108	6.15	8.10	14.25	110	8.55	8.90	17.45	99	9.00	7.75	16.75	102	8.70	9.25	17.95	71	97.35
106	Barry Brooker	Canada	7.60	8.30	15.90	104	7.30	7.70	15.00	104	7.90	8.55	16.45	97	8.90	8.75	17.65	92	7.20	8.05	15.25	112	8.65	7.80	16.45	109	96.70
107	Willi Jaschek	West Germany	9.15	2.00	11.15	113	9.25	9.55	18.80	16	9.10	9.30	18.40	25	9.10	–	9.10	114	9.35	9.50	18.85	26	9.30	9.45	18.75	29	95.05
108	Luis Navarrete	Cuba	7.00	8.80	15.80	106	7.90	8.25	16.15	98	6.50	7.15	13.65	113	8.40	9.20	17.60	94	7.40	8.60	16.00	110	8.25	7.00	15.25	111	94.45
109	Chu-Long Lai	Taiwan	8.30	7.90	16.20	102	4.50	7.80	12.30	110	7.65	7.65	15.30	108	8.60	8.40	17.00	108	8.70	7.70	16.40	109	8.70	8.40	17.10	98	94.30
110	Sergio Luna	Ecuador	6.60	8.45	15.05	111	5.50	5.75	11.25	111	8.10	8.60	16.70	91	8.35	8.70	17.05	106	7.70	8.95	16.65	105	8.05	8.55	16.60	106	93.30
111	Héctor Ramírez	Cuba	9.05	—	9.05	115	8.30	4.50	12.80	109	7.85	8.60	16.45	97	8.85	8.85	17.70	87	8.00	8.55	16.55	107	9.15	9.05	18.20	62	90.75
112	Fu Cheng	Taiwan	7.70	8.05	15.75	108	3.50	6.95	10.45	112	6.65	7.10	13.75	112	8.60	8.00	16.60	110	8.55	8.05	16.60	106	8.10	4.00	12.10	113	85.25
113	Pedro Rendón	Ecuador	6.25	7.50	13.75	112	3.50	5.80	9.30	113	5.50	6.95	12.45	114	6.75	7.15	13.90	112	5.70	7.55	13.25	113	4.65	3.50	8.15	114	70.80
114	Eduardo Nájera	Ecuador	7.35	7.85	15.20	110	4.00	3.50	7.50	114	6.70	7.15	13.85	111	—	8.05	8.05	116	5.50	7.20	12.70	114	8.05	4.70	12.75	112	70.05
115	Franco Menichelli	Italy	9.30	—	9.30	114	—	—	—	—	9.60	—	9.60	115	9.30	—	9.30	113	9.60	—	9.60	115	9.60	—	9.60	115	47.40
116	Norman Henson	Philippines	7.70	—	7.70	116	—	—	—	—	6.60	—	6.60	116	8.40	—	8.40	115	4.95	—	4.95	117	—	—	—	—	27.65
117	Ernesto Beren	Philippines	6.10	—	6.10	117	—	—	—	—	6.25	—	6.25	117	—	—	—	—	6.65	—	6.65	116	—	—	—	—	19.00
