= Gymnastics at the 1968 Summer Olympics – Men's pommel horse =

Olympic gymnastics event

Men's pommel horse at the Games of the XIX Olympiad
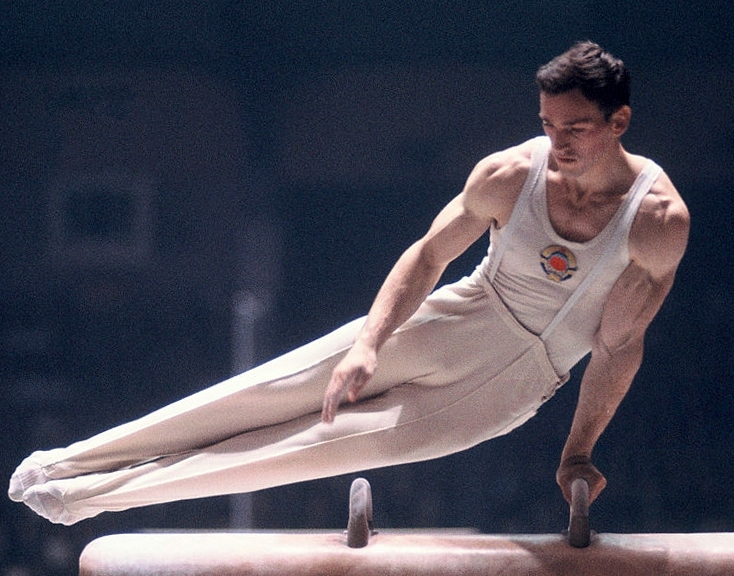
- Miroslav Cerar (1964)
- Venue: Auditorio Nacional
- Dates: 22–26 October 1968
- Competitors: 115 from 27 nations
- Winning score: 19.325

Medalists
1st place, gold medalist(s)		Miroslav Cerar	Yugoslavia
2nd place, silver medalist(s)		Olli Laiho	Finland
3rd place, bronze medalist(s)		Mikhail Voronin	Soviet Union

The men's pommel horse competition was one of eight events for male competitors in artistic gymnastics at the 1968 Summer Olympics in Mexico City. The event was held from 22 to 26 October at the Auditorio Nacional. There were 115 competitors from 27 nations, with nations in the team competition having up to 6 gymnasts and other nations entering up to 3 gymnasts. The event was won by Miroslav Cerar of Yugoslavia, the second man to successfully defend an Olympic pommel horse title. Olli Laiho of Finland took silver, while Mikhail Voronin of the Soviet Union finished with bronze. Japan's three-Games podium streak in the event ended, while the Soviet streak stretched to five Games.

== Background ==
This was the 12th appearance of the event, which is one of the five apparatus events held every time there were apparatus events at the Summer Olympics (no apparatus events were held in 1900, 1908, 1912, or 1920). Only one of the six finalists from 1964 returned: gold medalist Miroslav Cerar of Yugoslavia. Cerar had added another world championship to his pommel horse resume in 1966 and was the favorite to repeat as Olympic champion. Mikhail Voronin of the Soviet Union had been the runner-up at the world championships.

Ecuador made its debut in the men's pommel horse; East and West Germany competed separately for the first time. The United States made its 11th appearance, most of any nation, having missed only the inaugural 1896 Games.

== Competition format ==
Each nation entered a team of six gymnasts or up to three individual gymnasts. All entrants in the gymnastics competitions performed both a compulsory exercise and a voluntary exercise for each apparatus. The scores for all 12 exercises were summed to give an individual all-around score. (Three gymnasts who entered the all-around did not compete on the pommel horse.)

These exercise scores were also used for qualification for the new apparatus finals. The two exercises (compulsory and voluntary) for each apparatus were summed to give an apparatus score; the top 6 in each apparatus participated in the finals; others were ranked 7th through 114th. In the final, each gymnast performed an additional voluntary exercise; half of the score from the preliminary carried over.

== Schedule ==
All times are Central Standard Time (UTC-6)

Date	Time	Round
Tuesday, 22 October 1968	8:30; 17:00	Preliminary: Compulsory
Thursday, 24 October 1968	8:30; 17:00	Preliminary: Voluntary
Saturday, 26 October 1968	19:00	Final

== Results ==
Rank	Gymnast	Nation	Preliminary			Final		
Rank	Gymnast	Nation	Compulsory	Voluntary	Total	1/2 Prelim.	Final	Total
1st place, gold medalist(s)	Miroslav Cerar	Yugoslavia	9.65	9.70	19.35	9.675	9.650	19.325
2nd place, silver medalist(s)	Olli Laiho	Finland	9.45	9.70	19.15	9.575	9.650	19.225
3rd place, bronze medalist(s)	Mikhail Voronin	Soviet Union	9.70	9.50	19.20	9.600	9.600	19.200
4	Wilhelm Kubica	Poland	9.60	9.50	19.10	9.550	9.600	19.150
5	Eizo Kenmotsu	Japan	9.45	9.65	19.10	9.550	9.500	19.050
6	Viktor Klimenko	Soviet Union	9.50	9.60	19.10	9.550	9.400	18.950
7	Dave Thor	United States	9.50	9.60	19.10	did not advance		
8	Sergey Diomidov	Soviet Union	9.50	9.50	19.00	did not advance		
8	Jiří Fejtek	Czechoslovakia	9.40	9.60	19.00	did not advance		
8	Sawao Kato	Japan	9.45	9.55	19.00	did not advance		
8	Mikołaj Kubica	Poland	9.45	9.55	19.00	did not advance		
12	Valery Karasyov	Soviet Union	9.35	9.50	18.85	did not advance		
12	Akinori Nakayama	Japan	9.40	9.45	18.85	did not advance		
12	Miloslav Netušil	Czechoslovakia	9.30	9.55	18.85	did not advance		
12	Mauno Nissinen	Finland	9.40	9.45	18.85	did not advance		
16	Heinz Häussler	West Germany	9.30	9.50	18.80	did not advance		
16	Willi Jaschek	West Germany	9.25	9.55	18.80	did not advance		
18	Matthias Brehme	East Germany	9.50	9.25	18.75	did not advance		
19	Steve Hug	United States	9.30	9.40	18.70	did not advance		
20	Gerhard Dietrich	East Germany	9.15	9.50	18.65	did not advance		
20	Takeshi Katō	Japan	9.20	9.45	18.65	did not advance		
22	Viktor Lisitsky	Soviet Union	9.30	9.30	18.60	did not advance		
22	Paul Müller	Switzerland	9.25	9.35	18.60	did not advance		
24	Chung-tae Kim	South Korea	9.15	9.35	18.50	did not advance		
25	Valery Ilyinykh	Soviet Union	9.05	9.40	18.45	did not advance		
26	Yukio Endo	Japan	9.20	9.20	18.40	did not advance		
26	Sylwester Kubica	Poland	9.00	9.40	18.40	did not advance		
26	Peter Rohner	Switzerland	9.10	9.30	18.40	did not advance		
29	Michel Bouchonnet	France	9.10	9.25	18.35	did not advance		
29	Roland Hürzeler	Switzerland	9.30	9.05	18.35	did not advance		
29	Bohumil Mudřík	Czechoslovakia	9.10	9.25	18.35	did not advance		
29	Miloš Vratič	Yugoslavia	8.95	9.40	18.35	did not advance		
33	František Bočko	Czechoslovakia	8.90	9.40	18.30	did not advance		
33	Giovanni Carminucci	Italy	8.95	9.35	18.30	did not advance		
33	Hans Peter Nielsen	Denmark	9.00	9.30	18.30	did not advance		
36	Meinrad Berchtold	Switzerland	8.90	9.35	18.25	did not advance		
37	Bruno Franceschetti	Italy	9.00	9.25	18.25	did not advance		
38	Armando Valles	Mexico	9.05	9.10	18.15	did not advance		
39	Jerzy Kruża	Poland	9.00	9.10	18.10	did not advance		
39	Evert Lindgren	Sweden	8.75	9.35	18.10	did not advance		
41	Janez Brodnik	Yugoslavia	8.85	9.15	18.00	did not advance		
42	Luigi Cimnaghi	Italy	9.10	8.85	17.95	did not advance		
42	Andrzej Gonera	Poland	8.85	9.10	17.95	did not advance		
42	Gilbert Larose	Canada	8.90	9.05	17.95	did not advance		
45	Klaus Köste	East Germany	9.25	8.65	17.90	did not advance		
45	Václav Kubíčka	Czechoslovakia	8.90	9.00	17.90	did not advance		
45	Juhani Rahikainen	Finland	9.00	8.90	17.90	did not advance		
48	Hermann Höpfner	West Germany	8.80	9.00	17.80	did not advance		
48	Heikki Sappinen	Finland	8.60	9.20	17.80	did not advance		
48	Stan Wild	Great Britain	8.70	9.10	17.80	did not advance		
51	Pasquale Carminucci	Italy	8.70	9.05	17.75	did not advance		
52	Peter Weber	East Germany	8.75	8.95	17.70	did not advance		
53	Christian Guiffroy	France	9.05	8.60	17.65	did not advance		
53	Milenko Kersnić	Yugoslavia	8.85	8.80	17.65	did not advance		
53	Ivan Kondev	Bulgaria	8.80	8.85	17.65	did not advance		
53	Mitsuo Tsukahara	Japan	9.40	8.25	17.65	did not advance		
57	Reino Heino	Finland	8.80	8.80	17.60	did not advance		
58	Kanati Allen	United States	9.00	8.55	17.55	did not advance		
58	Vincenzo Mori	Italy	8.70	8.85	17.55	did not advance		
58	Fred Roethlisberger	United States	8.85	8.70	17.55	did not advance		
58	Aleksander Rokosa	Poland	8.55	9.00	17.55	did not advance		
58	Octavio Suárez	Cuba	8.65	7.90	17.55	did not advance		
63	Damir Anić	Yugoslavia	8.35	9.15	17.50	did not advance		
63	Steve Mitruk	Canada	8.75	8.75	17.50	did not advance		
65	Dezső Bordán	Hungary	8.80	8.65	17.45	did not advance		
65	Hans Ettlin	Switzerland	8.95	8.50	17.45	did not advance		
67	István Aranyos	Hungary	8.65	8.70	17.35	did not advance		
67	Steve Cohen	United States	9.00	8.35	17.35	did not advance		
67	Christian Deuza	France	9.00	8.35	17.35	did not advance		
67	Stefan Zoev	Bulgaria	9.35	8.00	17.35	did not advance		
71	Siegfried Fülle	East Germany	9.05	8.25	17.30	did not advance		
71	Sándor Kiss	Hungary	8.75	8.55	17.30	did not advance		
73	Georgi Adamov	Bulgaria	9.05	8.20	17.25	did not advance		
73	Tine Šrot	Yugoslavia	8.60	8.65	17.25	did not advance		
73	Fernando Valles	Mexico	8.90	8.35	17.25	did not advance		
76	Edwin Greutmann	Switzerland	8.60	8.60	17.20	did not advance		
76	Raycho Khristov	Bulgaria	8.40	8.80	17.20	did not advance		
76	Rogelio Mendoza	Mexico	8.15	9.05	17.20	did not advance		
76	Endre Tihanyi	Hungary	8.65	8.55	17.20	did not advance		
80	Finn Johannesson	Sweden	8.55	8.60	17.15	did not advance		
81	Erich Hess	West Germany	8.85	8.25	17.10	did not advance		
82	Roger Dion	Canada	8.55	8.45	17.00	did not advance		
83	Michael Booth	Great Britain	8.40	8.40	16.80	did not advance		
83	Helmut Tepasse	West Germany	7.70	9.10	16.80	did not advance		
85	Günter Beier	East Germany	8.75	8.00	16.75	did not advance		
85	Christer Jönsson	Sweden	8.85	7.90	16.75	did not advance		
85	Václav Skoumal	Czechoslovakia	7.90	8.85	16.75	did not advance		
85	Arne Thomsen	Denmark	7.70	9.05	16.75	did not advance		
89	Sid Jensen	Canada	8.70	8.00	16.70	did not advance		
89	Hannu Rantakari	Finland	8.35	8.35	16.70	did not advance		
89	Davaanyam Zagdbazaryn	Mongolia	8.45	8.25	16.70	did not advance		
92	Murray Chessell	Australia	8.40	8.25	16.25	did not advance		
93	Sid Freudenstein	United States	8.75	7.85	16.60	did not advance		
94	José Filipe Abreu	Portugal	8.40	8.10	16.50	did not advance		
95	Rumen Gabrovski	Bulgaria	8.40	8.00	16.40	did not advance		
95	Bozhidar Ivanov	Bulgaria	7.70	8.70	16.40	did not advance		
97	Béla Herczeg	Hungary	8.75	7.60	16.35	did not advance		
98	Luis Navarrete	Cuba	7.90	8.25	16.15	did not advance		
99	Konrád Mentsik	Hungary	7.50	8.60	16.10	did not advance		
99	Jorge Rodríguez	Cuba	7.70	8.40	16.10	did not advance		
101	Enrique García	Mexico	7.55	8.40	15.95	did not advance		
102	Heiko Reinemer	West Germany	7.00	8.80	15.80	did not advance		
103	José Vilchis	Mexico	7.80	7.70	15.50	did not advance		
104	Barry Brooker	Canada	7.30	7.70	15.00	did not advance		
105	José González	Mexico	8.20	6.45	14.65	did not advance		
105	Roberto Pumpido	Cuba	6.85	7.80	14.65	did not advance		
107	Luis Ramírez	Cuba	6.75	7.80	14.55	did not advance		
108	Larbi Lazhari	Algeria	6.65	7.00	13.65	did not advance		
109	Héctor Ramírez	Cuba	8.30	4.50	12.80	did not advance		
110	Chu-Long Lai	Chinese Taipei	4.50	7.80	12.30	did not advance		
111	Sergio Luna	Ecuador	5.50	5.75	11.25	did not advance		
112	Fu Cheng	Chinese Taipei	3.50	6.95	10.45	did not advance		
113	Pedro Rendón	Ecuador	3.50	5.80	9.30	did not advance		
114	Eduardo Nájera	Ecuador	4.00	3.50	7.50	did not advance		
115	Franco Menichelli	Italy	0.00	—	0.00	did not advance		
