= Gymnastics at the 1968 Summer Olympics – Men's horizontal bar =

Men's horizontal bar at the Games of the XIX Olympiad
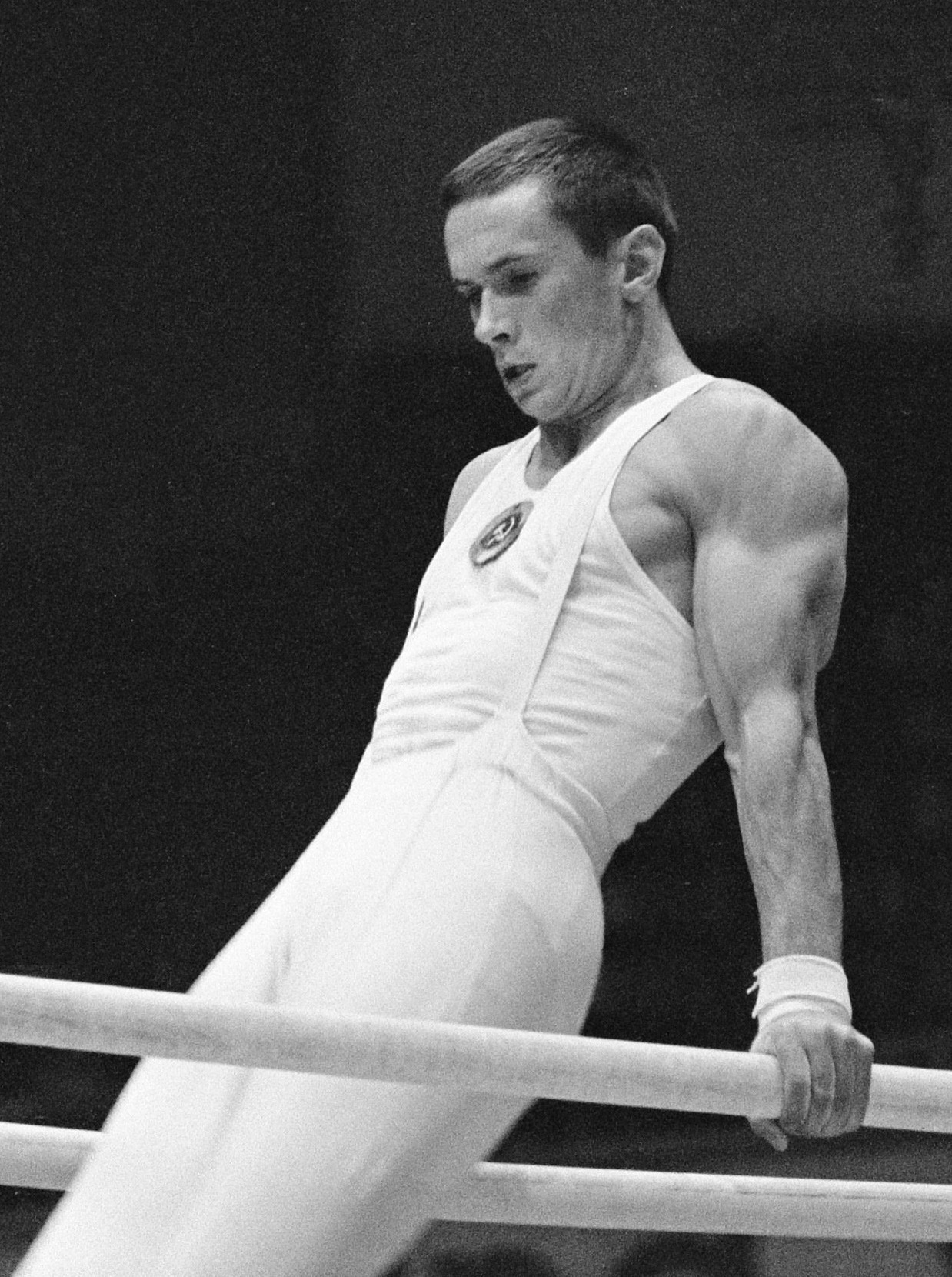
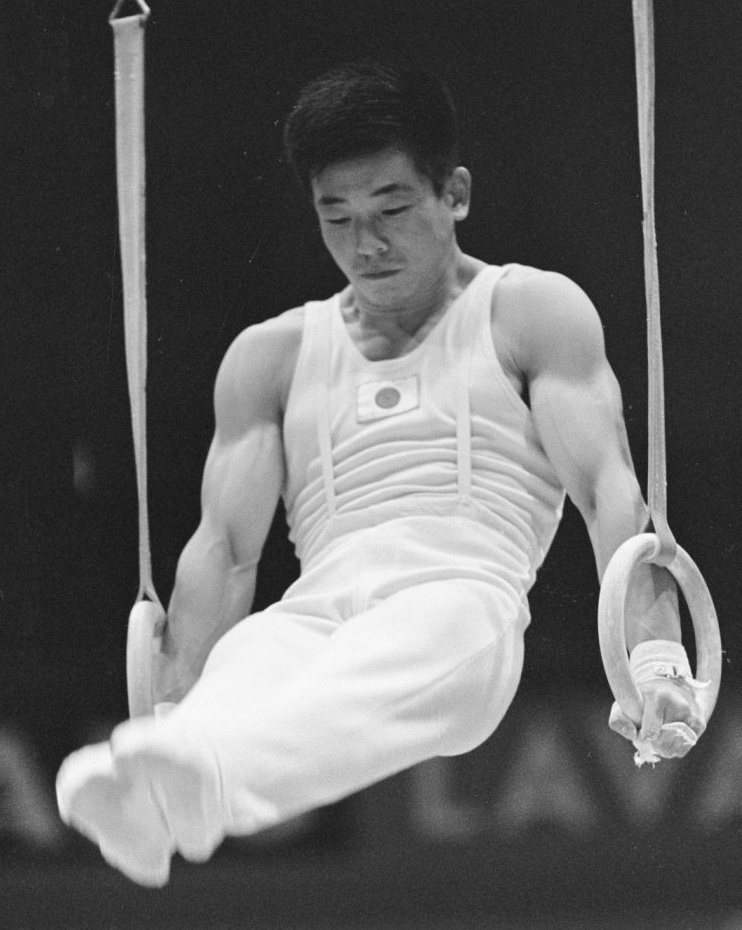
- Mikhail Voronin (1966, on parallel bars) Akinori Nakayama (1966, on rings)
- Venue: Auditorio Nacional
- Dates: 22–26 October 1968
- Competitors: 115 from 27 nations
- Winning score: 19.550

Medalists
1st place, gold medalist(s)		Mikhail Voronin; Soviet Union
1st place, gold medalist(s)		Akinori Nakayama; Japan
3rd place, bronze medalist(s)		Eizo Kenmotsu; Japan

The men's horizontal bar competition was one of eight events for male competitors in artistic gymnastics at the 1968 Summer Olympics in Mexico City. The event was held on 22, 24, and 26 October. There were 115 competitors from 27 nations, with nations in the team competition having up to 6 gymnasts and other nations entering up to 3 gymnasts. The event was won in a tie between Akinori Nakayama of Japan (the nation's third victory in the horizontal bar in four Games, tying Switzerland for most all-time) and Mikhail Voronin of the Soviet Union (the nation's second consecutive gold medal in the event, tying the United States for third-most all-time). Eizo Kenmotsu of Japan took bronze.

== Background ==
This was the 12th appearance of the event, which is one of the five apparatus events held every time there were apparatus events at the Summer Olympics (no apparatus events were held in 1900, 1908, 1912, or 1920). Three of the six finalists from 1964 returned: bronze medalist Miroslav Cerar of Yugoslavia, fourth-place finisher Victor Lisitsky of the Soviet Union, and fifth-place finisher Yukio Endo of Japan. Cerar and Endo had both been finalists in 1960 as well. Japan had swept the medals at the 1966 world championships, with Akinori Nakayama winning, Endo taking second, and Takashi Mitsukuri third. Cerar had tied with Mikhail Voronin of the Soviet Union for fourth.

Ecuador and the Philippines each made their debut in the men's horizontal bar; East and West Germany competed separately for the first time. The United States made its 11th appearance, most of any nation, having missed only the inaugural 1896 Games.

== Competition format ==
Each nation entered a team of six gymnasts or up to three individual gymnasts. All entrants in the gymnastics competitions performed both a compulsory exercise and a voluntary exercise for each apparatus. The scores for all 12 exercises were summed to give an individual all-around score. (Two gymnasts who entered the all-around competition did not perform on the horizontal bar.)

These exercise scores were also used for qualification for the new apparatus finals. The two exercises (compulsory and voluntary) for each apparatus were summed to give an apparatus score; the top 6 in each apparatus participated in the finals; others were ranked 7th through 115th. In the final, each gymnast performed an additional voluntary exercise; half of the score from the preliminary carried over.

== Schedule ==
All times are Central Standard Time (UTC-6)

Date	Time	Round
Tuesday, 22 October 1968	8:30; 17:00	Preliminary: Compulsory
Thursday, 24 October 1968	8:30; 17:00	Preliminary: Voluntary
Saturday, 26 October 1968	19:00	Final

== Results ==
Rank	Gymnast	Nation	Preliminary			Final		
Rank	Gymnast	Nation	Compulsory	Voluntary	Total	1/2 Prelim.	Final	Total
1st place, gold medalist(s)	Mikhail Voronin	Soviet Union	9.70	9.80	19.50	9.750	9.800	19.550
1st place, gold medalist(s)	Akinori Nakayama	Japan	9.70	9.80	19.50	9.750	9.800	19.550
3rd place, bronze medalist(s)	Eizo Kenmotsu	Japan	9.55	9.80	19.35	9.675	9.700	19.375
4	Klaus Köste	East Germany	9.75	9.70	19.45	9.725	9.500	19.225
5	Sergey Diomidov	Soviet Union	9.60	9.70	19.30	9.650	9.500	19.150
6	Yukio Endo	Japan	9.55	9.70	19.25	9.625	9.400	19.025
7	Sawao Kato	Japan	9.60	9.85	19.45	did not compete		
8	Valery Ilyinykh	Soviet Union	9.50	9.70	19.20	did not advance		
8	Wilhelm Kubica	Poland	9.50	9.70	19.20	did not advance		
10	Matthias Brehme	East Germany	9.55	9.60	19.15	did not advance		
11	Siegfried Fülle	East Germany	9.55	9.55	19.10	did not advance		
11	Takeshi Katō	Japan	9.55	9.55	19.10	did not advance		
11	Viktor Klimenko	Soviet Union	9.50	9.60	19.10	did not advance		
11	Mitsuo Tsukahara	Japan	9.50	9.60	19.10	did not advance		
15	Christian Guiffroy	France	9.50	9.50	19.00	did not advance		
15	Václav Skoumal	Czechoslovakia	9.45	9.55	19.00	did not advance		
17	Janez Brodnik	Yugoslavia	9.45	9.50	18.95	did not advance		
17	Mauno Nissinen	Finland	9.45	9.50	18.95	did not advance		
19	Miroslav Cerar	Yugoslavia	9.55	9.35	18.90	did not advance		
19	Erich Hess	West Germany	9.55	9.35	18.90	did not advance		
19	Christer Jönsson	Sweden	9.50	9.40	18.90	did not advance		
19	Raycho Khristov	Bulgaria	9.50	9.40	18.90	did not advance		
23	Gerhard Dietrich	East Germany	9.30	9.55	18.85	did not advance		
23	Hans Ettlin	Switzerland	9.40	9.45	18.85	did not advance		
25	Mikołaj Kubica	Poland	9.20	9.60	18.80	did not advance		
25	Viktor Lisitsky	Soviet Union	9.35	9.45	18.80	did not advance		
25	Konrád Mentsik	Hungary	9.30	9.50	18.80	did not advance		
25	Peter Weber	East Germany	9.40	9.40	18.80	did not advance		
29	Meinrad Berchtold	Switzerland	9.40	9.35	18.75	did not advance		
29	Luigi Cimnaghi	Italy	9.35	9.40	18.75	did not advance		
29	Willi Jaschek	West Germany	9.30	9.45	18.75	did not advance		
29	Hannu Rantakari	Finland	8.25	9.50	17.75	did not advance		
33	Valery Karasyov	Soviet Union	9.40	9.30	18.70	did not advance		
34	Georgi Adamov	Bulgaria	9.50	9.15	18.65	did not advance		
34	Günter Beier	East Germany	9.40	9.25	18.65	did not advance		
34	František Bočko	Czechoslovakia	9.25	9.40	18.65	did not advance		
34	Chung-tae Kim	South Korea	9.20	9.45	18.65	did not advance		
34	Heiko Reinemer	West Germany	9.20	9.45	18.65	did not advance		
39	Michel Bouchonnet	France	9.20	9.40	18.60	did not advance		
39	Steve Hug	United States	9.25	9.35	18.60	did not advance		
39	Peter Rohner	Switzerland	9.25	9.35	18.60	did not advance		
42	Béla Herczeg	Hungary	9.15	9.40	18.55	did not advance		
42	Václav Kubíčka	Czechoslovakia	9.15	9.40	18.55	did not advance		
42	Dave Thor	United States	9.05	9.50	18.55	did not advance		
45	Christian Deuza	France	9.20	9.30	18.50	did not advance		
45	Miloš Vratič	Yugoslavia	9.20	9.30	18.50	did not advance		
47	Dezső Bordán	Hungary	9.05	9.40	18.45	did not advance		
47	Jiří Fejtek	Czechoslovakia	9.15	9.30	18.45	did not advance		
47	Bohumil Mudřík	Czechoslovakia	9.05	9.40	18.45	did not advance		
47	Fred Roethlisberger	United States	9.10	9.35	18.45	did not advance		
47	Helmut Tepasse	West Germany	9.35	9.10	18.45	did not advance		
52	Andrzej Gonera	Poland	9.15	9.25	18.40	did not advance		
52	Sylwester Kubica	Poland	9.40	9.00	18.40	did not advance		
52	Kanati Allen	United States	8.80	9.50	18.40	did not advance		
52	Sid Freudenstein	United States	8.95	9.45	18.40	did not advance		
56	Milenko Kersnić	Yugoslavia	9.05	9.30	18.35	did not advance		
57	Steve Cohen	United States	8.90	9.40	18.30	did not advance		
57	Hermann Höpfner	West Germany	9.20	9.10	18.30	did not advance		
59	Heikki Sappinen	Finland	8.90	9.35	18.25	did not advance		
59	Jerzy Kruża	Poland	8.90	9.35	18.25	did not advance		
59	Aleksander Rokosa	Poland	8.80	9.45	18.25	did not advance		
62	István Aranyos	Hungary	8.90	9.30	18.20	did not advance		
62	Heinz Häussler	West Germany	9.05	9.15	18.20	did not advance		
62	Héctor Ramírez	Cuba	9.15	9.05	18.20	did not advance		
62	Arne Thomsen	Denmark	9.00	9.20	18.20	did not advance		
66	Edwin Greutmann	Switzerland	9.05	9.10	18.15	did not advance		
66	Juhani Rahikainen	Finland	8.95	9.20	18.15	did not advance		
66	Stefan Zoev	Bulgaria	9.25	8.90	18.15	did not advance		
69	Olli Laiho	Finland	8.65	9.40	18.05	did not advance		
69	Evert Lindgren	Sweden	8.70	9.35	18.05	did not advance		
71	Sid Jensen	Canada	8.80	9.20	18.00	did not advance		
72	Larbi Lazhari	Algeria	8.70	9.25	17.95	did not advance		
72	Jorge Rodríguez	Cuba	8.75	9.20	17.95	did not advance		
72	Endre Tihanyi	Hungary	8.80	9.15	17.95	did not advance		
75	Roland Hürzeler	Switzerland	8.40	9.45	17.85	did not advance		
76	Rogelio Mendoza	Mexico	8.80	9.00	17.80	did not advance		
76	Damir Anić	Yugoslavia	8.80	9.00	17.80	did not advance		
76	Roger Dion	Canada	8.95	8.85	17.80	did not advance		
76	Bruno Franceschetti	Italy	8.70	9.10	17.80	did not advance		
76	Paul Müller	Switzerland	9.00	8.80	17.80	did not advance		
81	Michael Booth	Great Britain	8.75	9.00	17.75	did not advance		
81	Giovanni Carminucci	Italy	9.30	8.45	17.75	did not advance		
81	Pasquale Carminucci	Italy	8.80	8.95	17.75	did not advance		
81	Ivan Kondev	Bulgaria	8.75	9.00	17.75	did not advance		
85	Enrique García	Mexico	8.65	9.05	17.70	did not advance		
85	Reino Heino	Finland	8.40	9.30	17.70	did not advance		
85	Sándor Kiss	Hungary	8.60	9.10	17.70	did not advance		
88	José Vilchis	Mexico	8.85	8.80	17.65	did not advance		
89	José González	Mexico	8.85	8.75	17.60	did not advance		
90	Steve Mitruk	Canada	8.70	8.75	17.45	did not advance		
90	Tine Šrot	Yugoslavia	8.40	9.05	17.45	did not advance		
92	Gilbert Larose	Canada	8.80	8.60	17.40	did not advance		
92	Roberto Pumpido	Cuba	8.65	8.75	17.40	did not advance		
94	Finn Johannesson	Sweden	7.95	9.40	17.35	did not advance		
95	Hans Peter Nielsen	Denmark	8.30	9.00	17.30	did not advance		
95	Armando Valles	Mexico	9.30	8.00	17.30	did not advance		
97	Stan Wild	Great Britain	8.50	8.75	17.25	did not advance		
98	Chu-Long Lai	Taiwan	8.70	8.40	17.10	did not advance		
99	José Filipe Abreu	Portugal	8.40	8.50	16.90	did not advance		
100	Rumen Gabrovski	Bulgaria	9.10	7.75	16.85	did not advance		
101	Miloslav Netušil	Czechoslovakia	7.50	9.25	16.75	did not advance		
101	Luis Ramírez	Cuba	7.80	8.95	16.75	did not advance		
101	Fernando Valles	Mexico	8.35	8.40	16.75	did not advance		
104	Octavio Suárez	Cuba	7.50	9.20	16.70	did not advance		
105	Bozhidar Ivanov	Bulgaria	7.50	9.15	16.65	did not advance		
106	Sergio Luna	Ecuador	8.05	8.55	16.60	did not advance		
107	Vincenzo Mori	Italy	8.45	8.10	16.55	did not advance		
108	Davaanyam Zagdbazaryn	Mongolia	8.50	8.00	16.50	did not advance		
109	Barry Brooker	Canada	8.65	7.80	16.45	did not advance		
110	Murray Chessell	Australia	8.05	8.25	16.30	did not advance		
111	Luis Navarrete	Cuba	8.25	7.00	15.25	did not advance		
112	Eduardo Nájera	Ecuador	8.05	4.70	12.75	did not advance		
113	Fu Cheng	Taiwan	8.10	4.00	12.10	did not advance		
114	Franco Menichelli	Italy	9.60	—	9.60	did not advance		
115	Pedro Rendón	Ecuador	4.65	3.50	8.15	did not advance		
