= Gymnastics at the 1968 Summer Olympics – Men's artistic team all-around =

Men's artistic team all-around at the Games of the XIX Olympiad
- Venue: National Audiorium
- Date: 22–24 October 1968
- Competitors: 95 from 16 nations
- Winning total: 575.90

Medalists
1st place, gold medalist(s)		Yukio Endo; Sawao Kato; Takeshi Katō; Eizo Kenmotsu; Akinori Nakayama; Mitsuo Tsukahara	Japan
2nd place, silver medalist(s)		Sergei Diomidov; Valery Iljinykh; Valery Karasev; Viktor Klimenko; Victor Lisitsky; Mikhail Voronin	Soviet Union
3rd place, bronze medalist(s)		Günter Beier; Matthias Brehme; Gerhard Dietrich; Siegfried Fülle; Klaus Köste; Peter Weber	East Germany

These are the results of the men's team all-around competition, one of eight events for male competitors in artistic gymnastics at the 1968 Summer Olympics in Mexico City.

== Competition format ==
The scoring in all the events was similar to that of the gymnastics events at the 1960 Summer Olympics in Rome, Italy. Six best gymnasts on the apparatus in the team competition (by sum of two scores - for compulsory and optional routine) qualified for that apparatus finals. The new feature of the competition was in women's events: each of them was judged by four judges, like men's ones. The highest and lowest marks were dropped and an average of two remaining marks constituted the score.

Each nation entered a team of six gymnasts. All entrants in the gymnastics competitions performed both a compulsory exercise and a voluntary exercise for each apparatus. The top five individual scores in each exercise (that is, compulsory floor, voluntary floor, compulsory vault, etc.) were added to give a team score for that exercise. The 12 team exercise scores were summed to give a team total.

No separate finals were contested for the team all-around.

Exercise scores ranged from 0 to 10, apparatus scores from 0 to 20, individual totals from 0 to 120, and team scores from 0 to 600.

=== Results ===
After Japan won the team gold, Eizo Kenmotsu became the youngest ever Japanese male gymnast to win an Olympic gold medal. He was 20 years, 8 months and 11 days old, and would hold on to this record for almost 50 years until Kenzo Shirai broke it in 2016, becoming also Japan‘s only teenage male gymnast to do so at this level.

The men's artistic gymnastics all-around team event Olympic final took place on 24 October 1968.

Rank	Nation	Gymnasts	Exercise results												Team total
Rank	Nation	Gymnasts	Floor (gymnastics)		Pommel horse		Rings (gymnastics)		Vault (gymnastics)		Parallel bars		Horizontal bar		Team total
Rank	Nation	Gymnasts	C	V	C	V	C	V	C	V	C	V	C	V	Team total
1st place, gold medalist(s)	Japan	Yukio Endo	~~9.15~~	9.65	9.20	9.20	~~9.45~~	9.50	9.35	9.65	9.65	~~9.50~~	9.55	9.70	575.90
1st place, gold medalist(s)	Japan	Sawao Kato	9.75	9.90	9.45	9.55	9.70	9.85	9.35	9.55	9.65	9.70	9.60	9.85	575.90
1st place, gold medalist(s)	Japan	Takeshi Katō	9.60	9.75	~~9.20~~	9.45	9.70	9.70	9.45	9.60	9.60	9.70	9.55	~~9.55~~	575.90
1st place, gold medalist(s)	Japan	Eizo Kenmotsu	9.55	9.70	9.45	9.65	9.55	~~9.45~~	9.40	9.55	9.60	9.65	9.55	9.80	575.90
1st place, gold medalist(s)	Japan	Akinori Nakayama	9.60	9.80	9.40	9.45	9.75	9.75	9.45	9.40	9.70	9.85	9.70	9.80	575.90
1st place, gold medalist(s)	Japan	Mitsuo Tsukahara	9.50	~~9.60~~	9.40	~~8.25~~	9.65	9.60	~~9.05~~	~~9.40~~	~~8.35~~	9.60	~~9.50~~	9.60	575.90
1st place, gold medalist(s)	Japan	Total	48.00	48.80	46.90	47.30	48.35	48.40	47.00	47.75	48.20	48.50	47.95	48.75	575.90
2nd place, silver medalist(s)	Soviet Union	Sergey Diomidov	9.50	9.45	9.50	9.50	9.60	9.45	9.45	9.45	~~9.45~~	9.45	9.60	9.70	571.10
2nd place, silver medalist(s)	Soviet Union	Valery Karasyov	9.55	9.55	9.35	9.50	9.45	~~9.15~~	9.40	9.45	9.55	9.60	9.40	~~9.30~~	571.10
2nd place, silver medalist(s)	Soviet Union	Viktor Klimenko	9.25	9.50	9.50	9.60	9.40	9.50	9.45	9.40	9.60	9.65	9.50	9.60	571.10
2nd place, silver medalist(s)	Soviet Union	Viktor Lisitsky	9.50	9.50	9.30	~~9.30~~	9.40	9.40	9.40	~~9.40~~	9.60	~~9.00~~	~~9.35~~	9.45	571.10
2nd place, silver medalist(s)	Soviet Union	Valery Ilyinykh	~~9.10~~	~~8.85~~	~~9.05~~	9.40	~~9.30~~	9.30	~~9.30~~	9.45	9.50	9.45	9.50	9.70	571.10
2nd place, silver medalist(s)	Soviet Union	Mikhail Voronin	9.55	9.70	9.70	9.50	9.75	9.70	9.45	9.55	9.75	9.70	9.70	9.80	571.10
2nd place, silver medalist(s)	Soviet Union	Total	47.35	47.70	47.35	47.50	47.60	47.35	47.15	47.30	48.00	47.85	47.70	48.25	571.10
3rd place, bronze medalist(s)	East Germany	Günter Beier	9.00	9.20	8.75	~~8.00~~	~~8.45~~	~~9.10~~	9.30	9.30	9.10	9.35	9.40	~~9.25~~	557.15
3rd place, bronze medalist(s)	East Germany	Matthias Brehme	9.10	9.40	9.50	9.25	9.30	9.40	9.20	9.45	9.60	9.50	9.55	9.60	557.15
3rd place, bronze medalist(s)	East Germany	Gerhard Dietrich	~~8.80~~	9.30	9.15	9.50	8.85	9.20	~~9.00~~	~~9.00~~	~~8.70~~	9.35	~~9.30~~	9.55	557.15
3rd place, bronze medalist(s)	East Germany	Siegfried Fülle	9.15	9.45	9.05	8.25	9.05	9.40	9.35	9.45	9.40	9.45	9.55	9.55	557.15
3rd place, bronze medalist(s)	East Germany	Klaus Köste	9.20	9.35	9.25	8.65	9.40	9.40	9.15	9.25	9.45	~~9.30~~	9.75	9.70	557.15
3rd place, bronze medalist(s)	East Germany	Peter Weber	8.85	~~9.05~~	~~8.75~~	8.95	9.00	9.30	9.20	9.30	9.50	9.45	9.40	9.40	557.15
3rd place, bronze medalist(s)	East Germany	Total	45.30	46.70	45.70	44.60	45.60	46.70	46.20	46.75	47.05	47.10	47.65	47.80	557.15
4	Czechoslovakia	František Bočko	9.20	9.45	8.90	9.40	8.95	9.20	9.25	9.30	9.30	9.40	9.25	9.40	557.10
4	Czechoslovakia	Jiří Fejtek	9.15	9.25	9.40	9.60	9.35	9.40	9.10	9.40	~~8.60~~	9.50	9.15	9.30	557.10
4	Czechoslovakia	Václav Kubíčka	9.40	9.40	8.90	9.00	9.00	9.30	9.30	9.25	9.60	9.60	9.15	9.40	557.10
4	Czechoslovakia	Bohumil Mudřík	~~9.10~~	9.30	9.10	9.25	~~8.25~~	9.10	9.25	9.30	9.35	9.50	9.05	9.40	557.10
4	Czechoslovakia	Miloslav Netušil	9.40	~~9.20~~	9.30	9.55	9.10	8.95	~~8.95~~	~~9.15~~	9.45	9.60	~~7.50~~	~~9.25~~	557.10
4	Czechoslovakia	Václav Skoumal	9.25	9.30	~~7.90~~	~~8.85~~	8.95	~~8.95~~	9.20	9.25	9.30	~~9.30~~	9.45	9.55	557.10
4	Czechoslovakia	Total	46.40	46.70	45.60	46.80	45.35	45.95	46.10	46.50	47.00	47.60	46.05	47.05	557.10
5	Poland	Andrzej Gonera	~~8.75~~	9.05	8.85	9.10	9.00	9.30	8.90	9.35	9.05	9.50	9.15	9.25	555.40
5	Poland	Jerzy Kruża	8.90	~~8.95~~	9.00	9.10	8.90	~~8.80~~	9.00	~~9.15~~	~~8.95~~	~~9.15~~	8.90	9.35	555.40
5	Poland	Mikołaj Kubica	9.20	9.30	9.45	9.55	9.30	9.45	9.30	9.40	9.45	9.60	9.20	9.60	555.40
5	Poland	Sylwester Kubica	9.30	9.15	9.00	9.40	~~8.75~~	9.05	~~8.75~~	9.30	9.30	9.40	9.40	~~9.00~~	555.40
5	Poland	Wilhelm Kubica	9.25	9.30	9.60	9.50	9.30	9.30	9.25	9.30	9.50	9.65	9.50	9.70	555.40
5	Poland	Aleksander Rokosa	8.80	9.20	~~8.55~~	~~9.00~~	9.05	9.20	9.20	9.20	9.15	9.25	~~8.80~~	9.45	555.40
5	Poland	Total	45.45	46.00	45.90	46.65	45.55	46.30	45.65	46.55	46.45	47.40	46.15	47.35	555.40
6	Yugoslavia	Damir Anić	8.50	9.10	~~8.35~~	9.15	~~8.25~~	8.90	~~8.85~~	~~9.05~~	8.85	~~9.00~~	8.80	~~9.00~~	550.75
6	Yugoslavia	Janez Brodnik	9.05	9.00	8.85	9.15	9.20	9.30	9.25	9.35	9.30	9.35	9.45	9.50	550.75
6	Yugoslavia	Miroslav Cerar	9.25	9.40	9.65	9.70	9.30	9.40	9.20	9.40	9.60	9.50	9.55	9.35	550.75
6	Yugoslavia	Milenko Kersnić	9.20	9.10	8.85	8.80	9.05	9.10	9.10	9.30	9.50	9.50	9.05	9.30	550.75
6	Yugoslavia	Tine Šrot	~~7.40~~	~~8.60~~	8.60	~~8.65~~	9.20	9.20	9.05	9.25	~~8.20~~	9.20	~~8.40~~	9.05	550.75
6	Yugoslavia	Miloš Vratič	8.75	8.90	8.95	9.40	8.75	~~8.90~~	9.20	9.30	8.90	9.35	9.20	9.30	550.75
6	Yugoslavia	Total	44.75	45.50	44.90	46.20	45.50	45.90	45.80	46.60	46.15	46.90	46.05	46.50	550.75
7	United States	Kanati Allen	9.10	9.20	9.00	8.55	~~7.80~~	~~8.50~~	9.00	9.15	~~7.70~~	~~9.05~~	~~8.80~~	9.50	548.90
7	United States	Steve Cohen	~~8.85~~	~~8.75~~	9.00	8.35	9.30	9.60	8.95	9.05	9.10	9.50	8.90	9.40	548.90
7	United States	Sid Freudenstein	9.15	9.50	~~8.75~~	~~7.85~~	8.90	9.15	9.10	~~8.95~~	8.85	9.40	8.95	9.45	548.90
7	United States	Steve Hug	9.00	9.15	9.30	9.40	8.80	9.10	~~8.75~~	9.05	9.05	9.40	9.25	9.35	548.90
7	United States	Fred Roethlisberger	8.95	9.40	8.85	8.70	9.15	9.20	9.25	9.15	9.10	9.50	9.10	~~9.35~~	548.90
7	United States	Dave Thor	9.15	9.30	9.50	9.60	9.00	9.00	9.10	9.40	8.70	9.30	9.05	9.50	548.90
7	United States	Total	45.35	46.55	45.65	44.60	45.15	46.05	45.40	45.80	44.80	47.10	45.25	47.20	548.90
8	West Germany	Heinz Häussler	9.00	9.15	9.30	9.50	8.65	~~8.90~~	~~8.85~~	8.95	9.20	9.10	~~9.05~~	9.15	548.35
8	West Germany	Erich Hess	9.00	9.05	8.85	~~8.25~~	8.90	9.25	9.00	9.25	~~8.85~~	~~8.45~~	9.55	9.35	548.35
8	West Germany	Hermann Höpfner	9.00	9.05	8.80	9.00	8.45	9.10	8.95	9.15	9.10	9.20	9.20	9.10	548.35
8	West Germany	Willi Jaschek	9.15	~~2.00~~	9.25	9.55	9.10	9.30	9.10	—	9.35	9.50	9.30	9.45	548.35
8	West Germany	Heiko Reinemer	9.25	9.40	~~7.00~~	8.80	8.85	9.40	9.00	9.35	9.20	9.30	9.20	9.45	548.35
8	West Germany	Helmut Tepasse	~~9.00~~	9.00	7.70	9.10	~~8.45~~	9.30	9.05	9.40	9.45	9.45	9.35	9.10	548.35
8	West Germany	Total	45.40	45.65	43.90	45.95	43.95	46.35	45.10	46.10	46.30	46.55	46.60	46.50	548.35
9	Switzerland	Meinrad Berchtold	8.95	8.95	8.90	9.35	8.95	9.20	9.20	9.35	9.45	9.45	9.40	9.35	548.20
9	Switzerland	Hans Ettlin	~~8.60~~	9.05	8.95	~~8.50~~	9.20	9.35	9.10	9.25	9.55	9.50	9.40	9.45	548.20
9	Switzerland	Edwin Greutmann	8.75	8.95	~~8.60~~	8.60	8.70	~~8.90~~	8.65	~~9.05~~	~~9.10~~	9.25	9.05	9.10	548.20
9	Switzerland	Roland Hürzeler	8.80	8.90	9.30	9.05	~~8.50~~	9.05	8.80	9.10	9.50	9.60	~~8.40~~	9.45	548.20
9	Switzerland	Paul Müller	8.65	~~8.80~~	9.25	9.35	8.85	9.00	~~8.45~~	9.10	9.30	~~9.25~~	9.00	~~8.80~~	548.20
9	Switzerland	Peter Rohner	9.05	9.15	9.10	9.30	8.90	8.95	8.75	9.30	9.30	9.40	9.25	9.35	548.20
9	Switzerland	Total	44.20	45.00	45.50	45.65	44.60	45.55	44.50	46.10	47.10	47.20	46.10	46.70	548.20
10	Finland	Reino Heino	8.85	8.80	8.80	8.80	9.00	9.15	8.90	8.80	~~9.00~~	9.10	8.40	9.30	547.05
10	Finland	Olli Laiho	8.60	~~8.75~~	9.45	9.70	~~8.00~~	9.20	9.15	9.00	9.50	9.55	8.65	9.40	547.05
10	Finland	Mauno Nissinen	9.20	9.10	9.40	9.45	9.30	9.25	8.95	9.00	9.40	9.60	9.45	9.50	547.05
10	Finland	Juhani Rahikainen	8.80	9.00	9.00	8.90	8.95	~~9.05~~	9.00	9.20	9.30	9.25	8.95	~~9.20~~	547.05
10	Finland	Hannu Rantakari	~~8.60~~	8.80	~~8.35~~	~~8.35~~	9.10	9.15	9.05	~~8.80~~	9.15	9.20	~~8.25~~	9.50	547.05
10	Finland	Heikki Sappinen	9.15	9.20	8.60	9.20	9.20	9.25	~~8.90~~	9.15	9.05	~~9.10~~	8.90	9.35	547.05
10	Finland	Total	44.60	44.90	45.25	46.05	45.55	46.00	45.05	45.15	46.40	46.70	44.35	47.05	547.05
11	Bulgaria	Georgi Adamov	~~8.20~~	~~8.90~~	9.05	8.20	8.80	8.85	9.20	9.20	9.35	9.45	9.50	9.15	538.15
11	Bulgaria	Rumen Gabrovski	8.90	9.10	8.40	8.00	8.60	8.95	9.10	9.05	8.95	9.00	9.10	~~7.75~~	538.15
11	Bulgaria	Bozhidar Ivanov	8.25	9.05	~~7.70~~	8.70	8.65	8.45	~~8.80~~	~~8.90~~	9.10	9.25	~~7.50~~	9.15	538.15
11	Bulgaria	Raycho Khristov	9.35	9.60	8.40	8.80	~~8.10~~	8.60	8.95	9.20	~~8.50~~	9.15	9.50	9.40	538.15
11	Bulgaria	Ivan Kondev	9.10	9.50	8.80	8.85	8.60	~~8.15~~	9.15	9.10	8.85	9.00	8.75	9.00	538.15
11	Bulgaria	Stefan Zoev	8.65	9.15	9.35	~~8.00~~	8.65	8.70	9.10	9.15	9.10	~~8.85~~	9.25	8.90	538.15
11	Bulgaria	Total	44.25	46.40	44.00	42.55	43.30	43.55	45.50	45.70	45.35	45.85	46.10	45.60	538.15
12	Italy	Giovanni Carminucci	8.75	9.00	8.95	9.35	8.75	8.90	9.05	8.70	9.45	9.40	9.30	8.45	537.05
12	Italy	Pasquale Carminucci	~~7.65~~	8.65	8.70	9.05	8.70	8.55	~~8.75~~	8.60	9.20	9.20	8.80	8.95	537.05
12	Italy	Luigi Cimnaghi	9.10	9.30	9.10	8.85	9.05	9.05	9.15	8.95	9.30	9.15	9.35	9.40	537.05
12	Italy	Bruno Franceschetti	7.75	8.65	9.00	9.25	8.80	9.00	8.80	8.95	9.15	9.15	8.70	9.10	537.05
12	Italy	Franco Menichelli	9.30	—	—	—	9.60	—	9.30	—	9.60	—	9.60	—	537.05
12	Italy	Vincenzo Mori	8.20	8.70	8.70	8.85	~~8.50~~	8.00	9.15	9.05	~~8.95~~	8.40	~~8.45~~	8.10	537.05
12	Italy	Total	43.10	44.30	44.45	45.35	44.90	43.50	45.45	44.25	46.70	45.30	45.75	44.00	537.05
13	Hungary	István Aranyos	8.35	~~8.70~~	8.65	8.70	8.70	9.00	9.05	9.20	9.25	9.20	8.90	9.30	535.25
13	Hungary	Dezső Bordán	~~7.90~~	8.80	8.80	8.65	7.95	~~7.80~~	9.05	~~8.85~~	9.30	9.50	9.05	9.40	535.25
13	Hungary	Béla Herczeg	8.45	8.75	8.75	~~7.60~~	7.20	8.85	8.80	9.05	9.25	9.30	9.15	9.40	535.25
13	Hungary	Sándor Kiss	8.65	9.15	8.75	8.55	~~6.90~~	8.95	9.05	9.15	9.40	9.35	~~8.60~~	~~9.10~~	535.25
13	Hungary	Konrád Mentsik	8.05	8.75	~~7.50~~	8.60	8.35	8.75	~~8.15~~	8.90	9.35	9.50	9.30	9.50	535.25
13	Hungary	Endre Tihanyi	9.10	9.00	8.65	8.55	8.80	9.20	9.15	9.05	~~9.10~~	~~9.05~~	8.80	9.15	535.25
13	Hungary	Total	42.60	44.45	43.60	43.05	41.00	44.75	45.10	45.35	46.55	46.85	45.20	46.75	535.25
14	Mexico	Enrique García	8.10	8.65	~~7.55~~	8.40	7.60	8.35	~~8.10~~	~~8.65~~	8.00	8.90	8.65	9.05	518.25
14	Mexico	José González	8.85	8.80	8.20	~~6.45~~	~~7.45~~	8.10	9.00	8.85	9.00	8.70	8.85	8.75	518.25
14	Mexico	Rogelio Mendoza	8.30	9.10	8.15	9.05	8.15	8.70	8.20	9.30	8.90	8.75	8.80	9.00	518.25
14	Mexico	Armando Valles	8.00	8.80	9.05	9.10	9.05	9.20	9.15	9.20	8.70	8.85	9.30	~~8.00~~	518.25
14	Mexico	Fernando Valles	~~7.35~~	8.45	8.90	8.35	7.75	~~7.85~~	8.85	9.15	~~7.20~~	~~8.45~~	~~8.35~~	8.40	518.25
14	Mexico	José Vilchis	8.00	~~8.40~~	7.80	7.70	8.55	9.00	8.60	8.80	8.00	8.70	8.85	8.80	518.25
14	Mexico	Total	41.25	43.80	42.10	42.60	41.10	43.35	43.80	45.30	42.60	43.90	44.45	44.00	518.25
15	Cuba	Luis Navarrete	~~7.00~~	8.80	7.90	8.25	~~6.50~~	~~7.15~~	8.40	9.20	~~7.40~~	8.60	8.25	~~7.00~~	515.85
15	Cuba	Roberto Pumpido	8.85	9.10	6.85	7.80	7.85	8.40	8.70	9.00	8.70	9.00	8.65	8.75	515.85
15	Cuba	Héctor Ramírez	9.05	—	8.30	~~4.50~~	7.85	8.60	8.85	8.85	8.00	8.55	9.15	9.05	515.85
15	Cuba	Luis Ramírez	8.30	9.20	~~6.75~~	7.80	8.55	8.95	8.60	~~8.85~~	8.55	8.65	7.80	8.95	515.85
15	Cuba	Jorge Rodríguez	9.05	9.35	7.70	8.40	8.25	8.90	8.95	9.10	8.95	~~8.15~~	8.75	9.20	515.85
15	Cuba	Octavio Suárez	8.05	8.80	8.65	7.90	8.80	8.85	~~8.40~~	9.15	8.00	9.20	~~7.50~~	9.20	515.85
15	Cuba	Total	43.30	45.25	39.40	40.15	41.30	43.70	43.50	45.30	42.20	44.00	42.60	45.15	515.85
16	Canada	Barry Brooker	7.60	8.30	7.30	7.70	7.90	8.55	8.90	8.75	7.20	8.05	8.65	7.80	474.85
16	Canada	Roger Dion	7.60	8.25	8.55	8.45	6.15	8.25	8.55	9.05	7.70	9.10	8.95	8.85	474.85
16	Canada	Sid Jensen	8.10	8.95	8.70	8.00	9.05	9.20	8.85	9.35	9.05	8.35	8.80	9.20	474.85
16	Canada	Gilbert Larose	8.60	9.30	8.90	9.05	9.00	9.30	9.10	9.20	8.20	9.20	8.80	8.60	474.85
16	Canada	Steve Mitruk	7.00	8.35	8.75	8.75	8.10	8.40	8.95	8.50	8.35	8.80	8.70	8.75	474.85
16	Canada	Total	38.90	43.15	42.20	41.95	40.20	43.70	44.35	44.85	40.50	43.50	43.90	43.20	474.85
