= Norman Henson =

Filipino gymnast

- Full name: Norman Venzon Henson
- Born: March 3, 1950 Arayat, Pampanga, Philippines
- Died: April 2014 (aged 64)
- Height: 162 cm (5 ft 4 in)

Gymnastics career
- Discipline: Men's artistic gymnastics
- Country represented: Philippines

Norman Venzon Henson (March 3, 1950 – April 2014) was a Filipino gymnast. He competed in five events at the 1968 Summer Olympics.

He was a resident of Manila Boystown along with fellow gymnast Ernesto Beren.

Henson died in April 2014.
