= José Filipe Abreu =

Portuguese gymnast (born 1948)

- Born: 28 March 1948 (age 78) Lisbon, Portugal
- Height: 1.59 m (5 ft 3 in)

Gymnastics career
- Discipline: Men's artistic gymnastics
- Country represented: Portugal
- Club: Lisboa Ginásio Clube

José Filipe Abreu (born 28 March 1948) is a Portuguese gymnast. He competed in the 1968 Summer Olympics.
