= Arne Thomsen =

Danish gymnast

- Born: 1 March 1942 (age 84) Esbjerg, Denmark

Gymnastics career
- Discipline: Men's artistic gymnastics
- Country represented: Denmark

Arne Thomsen (born 1 March 1942) is a Danish gymnast. He competed in seven events at the 1968 Summer Olympics.
