= Cheng Fu (gymnast) =

Taiwanese gymnast

- 鄭 虎
- Alternative name: Pinyin: Zhèng Hǔ
- Born: 19 June 1946 (age 80) Chinchiang, Republic of China
- Height: 1.65 m (5 ft 5 in)

Gymnastics career
- Discipline: Men's artistic gymnastics
- Country represented: Taiwan

Cheng Fu (born 19 June 1946) is a Taiwanese gymnast. He competed in seven events at the 1968 Summer Olympics.
