= Finn Johannesson =

Swedish gymnast (1943–2024)

- Full name: Finn Gustav Johannesson
- Born: 30 November 1943 Copenhagen, Nazi Germany
- Died: 13 January 2024 (aged 80)
- Height: 1.76 m (5 ft 9 in)

Gymnastics career
- Discipline: Men's artistic gymnastics
- Country represented: Sweden
- Club: Kristliga Förening av Unga Mäns Gymnastikavdelningar

Finn Gustav Johannesson (30 November 1943 – 13 January 2024) was a Swedish gymnast. He competed in seven events at the 1968 Summer Olympics. Johannesson died on 13 January 2024, at the age of 80.
