= Evert Lindgren =

Swedish gymnast

- Full name: Evert Eskil Lindgren
- Born: 26 February 1938 Gothenburg, Sweden
- Died: 20 June 2007 (aged 69) Solna, Sweden
- Height: 1.85 m (6 ft 1 in)

Gymnastics career
- Discipline: Men's artistic gymnastics
- Country represented: Sweden
- Club: Kristliga Förening av Unga Mäns Gymnastikavdelningar

Evert Eskil Lindgren (26 February 1938 – 20 June 2007) was a Swedish gymnast. He competed in seven events at the 1968 Summer Olympics.
