= Eduardo Nájera (gymnast) =

Ecuadorian gymnast (born 1948)

- Born: 27 September 1948 (age 77) Quito, Ecuador

Gymnastics career
- Discipline: Men's artistic gymnastics
- Country represented: Ecuador

Eduardo Nájera (born 27 September 1948) is an Ecuadorian gymnast. He competed in seven events at the 1968 Summer Olympics.
