= Michael Booth (gymnast) =

British gymnast (born 1946)

- Born: 20 January 1946 (age 80) Huddersfield, England

Gymnastics career
- Discipline: Men's artistic gymnastics
- Country represented: (United Kingdom) Great Britain

Michael Booth (born 20 January 1946) is a British gymnast. He competed in seven events at the 1968 Summer Olympics.
