= Hans Peter Nielsen (gymnast) =

Danish retired gymnast

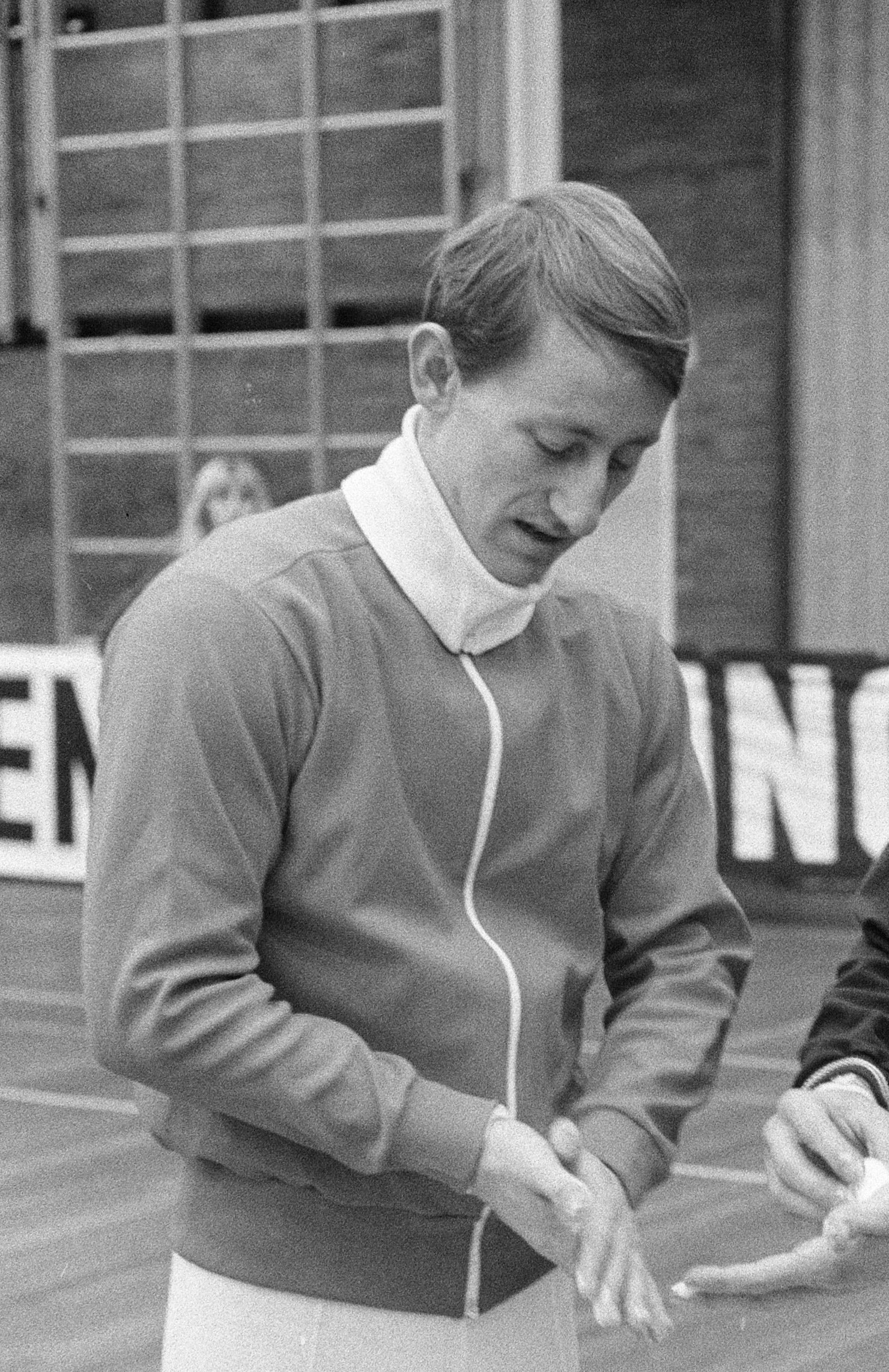
- Nielsen in 1969

Personal information
- Born: 4 March 1943 (age 83) Esbjerg, Denmark
- Height: 1.71 m (5 ft 7 in)

Gymnastics career
- Discipline: Men's artistic gymnastics
- Country represented: Denmark
- Club: Viborg Gymnastik-Forening

Hans Peter Nielsen (born 4 March 1943) is a Danish retired gymnast. He competed at the 1968 Summer Olympics in all artistic gymnastics events, with his best achievement of 33rd place on the pommel horse.
