= Christian Deuza =

French gymnast

- Born: 3 January 1944 (age 82) Boulogne-sur-Mer, France
- Height: 1.63 m (5 ft 4 in)

Gymnastics career
- Discipline: Men's artistic gymnastics
- Country represented: France
- Club: Fresnoy-le-Grand

Christian Deuza (born 3 January 1944) is a French gymnast. He competed at the 1968 Summer Olympics and the 1972 Summer Olympics.
