= Murray Chessell =

Australian gymnast

- Born: 1 June 1944 (age 82) Melbourne, Australia
- Height: 168 cm (5 ft 6 in)

Gymnastics career
- Discipline: Men's artistic gymnastics
- Country represented: Australia

Murray Chessell (born 1 July 1944) is an Australian lawyer and gymnast. He competed in seven events at the 1968 Summer Olympics.

In December 2000 Chessell was awarded the Australian Sports Medal in recognition of his services to gymnastics and in the 2002 Queen's Birthday Honours Chessell received the Medal of the Order of Australia for "service to the administration of gymnastics, particularly through the Australian Gymnastic Federation, and to the community".

Gymnastics Victoria awarded Chessell life membership in 2017.

Chessell was a partner of Chessell Williams, a law firm in Victoria, where he practised for 30 years. He retired in 2008.
