= Christer Jönsson =

Swedish gymnast

- Full name: Frans Christer Ingemar Jönsson
- Born: 16 August 1943 Helsingborg, Sweden
- Died: 26 January 2016 (aged 72) Markaryd, Sweden
- Height: 1.73 m (5 ft 8 in)

Gymnastics career
- Discipline: Men's artistic gymnastics
- Country represented: Sweden
- Club: Kristliga Förening av Unga Mäns Gymnastikavdelningar

Frans Christer Ingemar Jönsson (16 August 1943 – 26 January 2016) was a Swedish gymnast. He competed in seven events at the 1968 Summer Olympics.
