= Heinz Häussler =

German gymnast

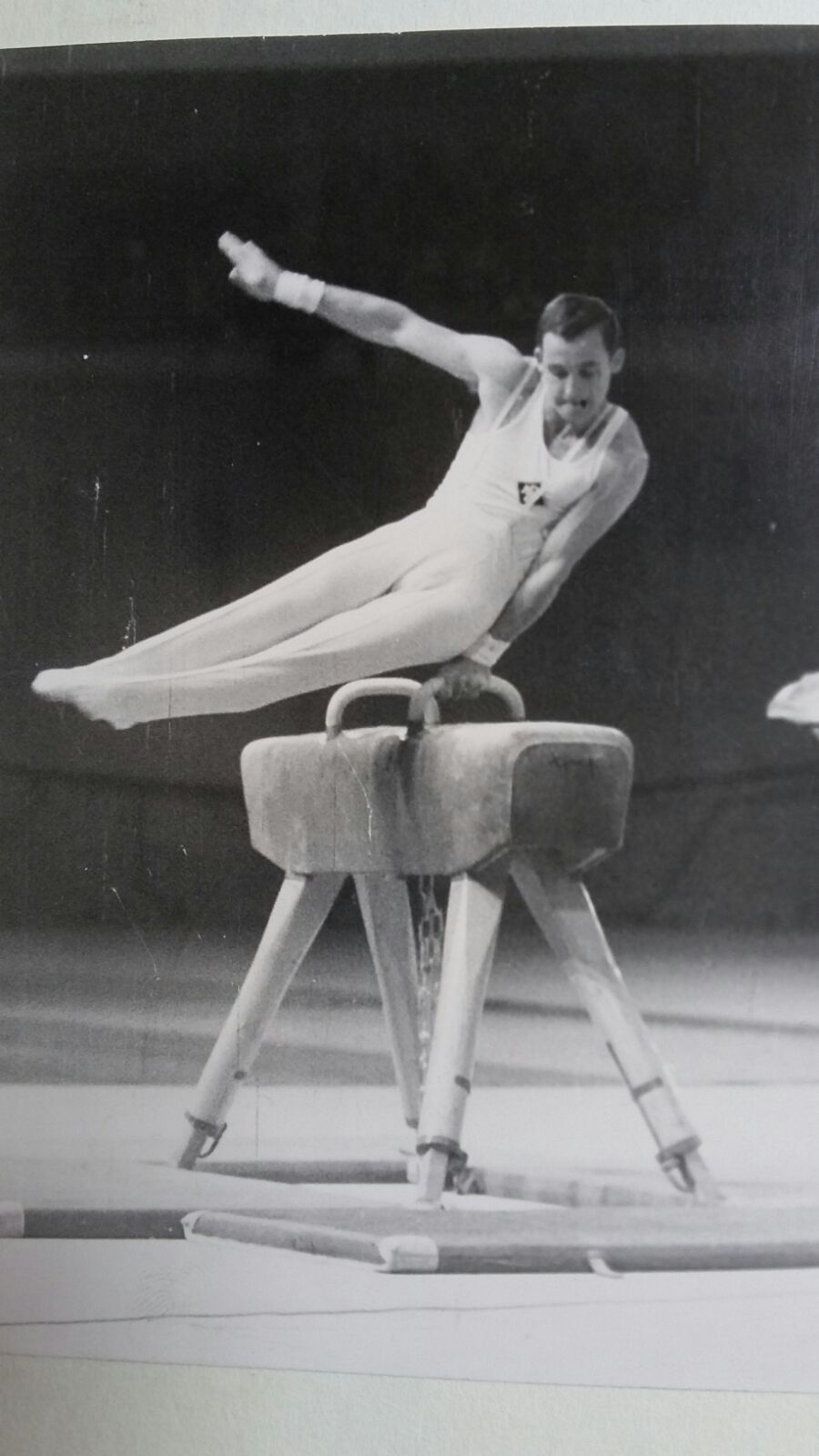
- Haeussler in 1969

Personal information
- Born: 7 November 1940 (age 85) Lindau im Bodensee, Nazi Germany
- Height: 1.74 m (5 ft 9 in)

Gymnastics career
- Discipline: Men's artistic gymnastics
- Country represented: West Germany
- Gym: Turn- und Sportverein Münchener Sportclub-Ost

Heinz Häussler (born 7 November 1940) is a German former gymnast. He competed at the 1968 Summer Olympics and the 1972 Summer Olympics.
