= Václav Skoumal =

Czech gymnast

- Born: 28 May 1944 (age 82) Zlín, Czechoslovakia

Gymnastics career
- Discipline: Men's artistic gymnastics
- Country represented: Czechoslovakia

Václav Skoumal (born 28 May 1944) is a Czech gymnast. He competed in eight events at the 1968 Summer Olympics.
