= Roberto Pumpido =

Cuban gymnast

- Full name: Roberto Pumpido Galmes
- Born: 15 December 1948 Havana, Cuba
- Died: 8 December 2008 (aged 59)

Gymnastics career
- Discipline: Men's artistic gymnastics
- Country represented: Cuba

Roberto Pumpido Galmes (15 December 1948 – 8 December 2008) was a Cuban gymnast. He competed in eight events at the 1968 Summer Olympics.

He immigrated to the United States in 1980 as part of the Mariel boatlift.
