= Jiří Fejtek =

Czech gymnast

- Born: 22 September 1946 (age 79) Prague, Czechoslovakia

Gymnastics career
- Discipline: Men's artistic gymnastics
- Country represented: Czechoslovakia

Jiří Fejtek (born 22 September 1946) is a Czech gymnast. He competed at the 1968 Summer Olympics and the 1972 Summer Olympics.
