= Erich Hess (gymnast) =

German gymnast

- Born: 20 June 1947 (age 79) Mannheim, Allied-occupied Germany
- Height: 1.70 m (5 ft 7 in)

Gymnastics career
- Discipline: Men's artistic gymnastics
- Country represented: West Germany

Erich Hess (born 20 June 1947) is a German gymnast. He competed in eight events at the 1968 Summer Olympics.
