= Endre Tihanyi =

Hungarian gymnast (1945–2022)

- Born: 29 January 1945 Budapest, Hungary
- Died: 15 December 2022 (aged 77) Budapest, Hungary
- Height: 1.67 m (5 ft 6 in)

Gymnastics career
- Discipline: Men's artistic gymnastics
- Country represented: Hungary
- Club: Ferencvárosi Torna Club

Endre Tihanyi (29 January 1945 – 15 December 2022) was a Hungarian gymnast. He competed in eight events at the 1968 Summer Olympics.

Tihanyi died in Budapest on 15 December 2022, at the age of 77.
