= Heiko Reinemer =

German gymnast

- Born: 14 June 1945 (age 81) Wiesbaden, Allied-occupied Germany
- Height: 1.70 m (5 ft 7 in)

Gymnastics career
- Discipline: Men's artistic gymnastics
- Country represented: West Germany

Heiko Reinemer (born 14 June 1945) is a German gymnast. He competed in eight events at the 1968 Summer Olympics.
