= Stefan Zoev =

Bulgarian gymnast (born 1943)

- Стефан Зоев
- Born: 19 January 1943 (age 83) Sofia, Bulgaria

Gymnastics career
- Discipline: Men's artistic gymnastics
- Country represented: Bulgaria

Stefan Zoev (Bulgarian: Стефан Зоев) (born 19 January 1943) is a Bulgarian gymnast. He competed at the 1968 Summer Olympics and the 1972 Summer Olympics.
