= Luis Ramírez (gymnast) =

Cuban gymnast

- Full name: Luis Ramírez de Armas
- Born: 13 January 1948 (age 78) Havana, Cuba

Gymnastics career
- Discipline: Men's artistic gymnastics
- Country represented: Cuba

Luis Ramírez de Armas (born 13 January 1948) is a Cuban gymnast. He competed at the 1968 Summer Olympics and the 1972 Summer Olympics.
