= Rumen Gabrovski =

Bulgarian gymnast (born 1946)

- Румен Габровски
- Born: 11 June 1946 (age 80) Haskovo, Bulgaria

Gymnastics career
- Discipline: Men's artistic gymnastics
- Country represented: Bulgaria

Rumen Gabrovski (Bulgarian: Румен Габровски) (born 11 June 1946) is a Bulgarian gymnast. He competed in eight events at the 1968 Summer Olympics.
