= Barry Brooker =

Canadian gymnast

- Born: 19 July 1941 (age 85) Toronto, Canada

Gymnastics career
- Discipline: Men's artistic gymnastics
- Country represented: Canada

Barry Brooker (born 19 July 1941) is a Canadian gymnast. He competed in eight events at the 1968 Summer Olympics.
