= Heikki Sappinen =

Finnish gymnast

- Full name: Heikki Juhani Sappinen
- Born: 5 October 1946 Turku, Finland
- Died: 1 May 2009 (aged 62)

Gymnastics career
- Discipline: Men's artistic gymnastics
- Country represented: Finland

Heikki Juhani Sappinen (5 October 1946 – 1 May 2009) was a Finnish gymnast. He competed in eight events at the 1968 Summer Olympics.
