= Luis Navarrete =

Cuban gymnast

- Full name: Luis Alfredo Navarrete Pacheco
- Born: 13 January 1948 (age 78) Havana, Cuba

Gymnastics career
- Discipline: Men's artistic gymnastics
- Country represented: Cuba

Luis Alfredo Navarrete Pacheco (born 13 January 1948) is a Cuban gymnast. He competed in eight events at the 1968 Summer Olympics.
