= José González (gymnast) =

Mexican gymnast (born 1946)

- Full name: José González S.
- Born: 15 January 1946 (age 80) Tlaxcala, Mexico
- Height: 1.64 m (5 ft 5 in)

Gymnastics career
- Discipline: Men's artistic gymnastics
- Country represented: Mexico

José González S. (born 15 January 1946) is a Mexican gymnast. He competed in eight events at the 1968 Summer Olympics.
