= Hermann Höpfner =

German gymnast

- Born: 11 September 1945 (age 81) Bad Dürkheim, Allied-occupied Germany
- Height: 1.68 m (5 ft 6 in)

Gymnastics career
- Discipline: Men's artistic gymnastics
- Country represented: West Germany

Hermann Höpfner (born 11 September 1945) is a German gymnast. He competed in eight events at the 1968 Summer Olympics.
