= Ivan Kondev =

Bulgarian gymnast (born 1944)

- Иван Кондев
- Born: 29 January 1944 Sliven, Bulgaria
- Died: May 2015 (aged 71)

Gymnastics career
- Discipline: Men's artistic gymnastics
- Country represented: Bulgaria

Ivan Kondev (Bulgarian: Иван Кондев) (born 29 January 1944 – May 2015) is a Bulgarian gymnast. He competed at the 1968 Summer Olympics and the 1972 Summer Olympics.
