= Dezső Bordán =

Hungarian gymnast

- Born: 26 June 1943 (age 83) Eger, Kingdom of Hungary
- Height: 1.74 m (5 ft 9 in)

Gymnastics career
- Discipline: Men's artistic gymnastics
- Country represented: Hungary
- Club: Újpesti Tornaegylet

Dezső Bordán (born 26 June 1943) is a Hungarian gymnast. He competed in eight events at the 1968 Summer Olympics.
