= Vincenzo Mori =

Italian gymnast

- Born: 25 December 1946 (age 79) Taranto, Italy
- Height: 1.70 m (5 ft 7 in)

Gymnastics career
- Discipline: Men's artistic gymnastics
- Country represented: Italy
- Club: Gruppo Sportivo Vigili del Fuoco "Giancarlo Brunetti" Roma

Vincenzo Mori (born 25 December 1946) is an Italian gymnast. He competed in eight events at the 1968 Summer Olympics.
