= Juhani Rahikainen =

Finnish gymnast

- Full name: Keijo Juhani Rahikainen
- Born: 26 June 1944 (age 82) Mikkeli, Finland

Gymnastics career
- Discipline: Men's artistic gymnastics
- Country represented: Finland

Keijo Juhani Rahikainen (born 26 June 1944) is a Finnish gymnast. He competed in eight events at the 1968 Summer Olympics.
