= Konrád Mentsik =

Hungarian gymnast

- Born: 19 April 1942 (age 84) Budapest, Kingdom of Hungary
- Height: 1.71 m (5 ft 7 in)

Gymnastics career
- Discipline: Men's artistic gymnastics
- Country represented: Hungary
- Club: Budapesti Honvéd Sportegyesület

Konrád Mentsik (born 19 April 1942) is a Hungarian gymnast. He competed in eight events at the 1968 Summer Olympics.
