= Gymnastics at the 1968 Summer Olympics – Men's rings =

Olympic gymnastics event

Men's rings at the Games of the XIX Olympiad
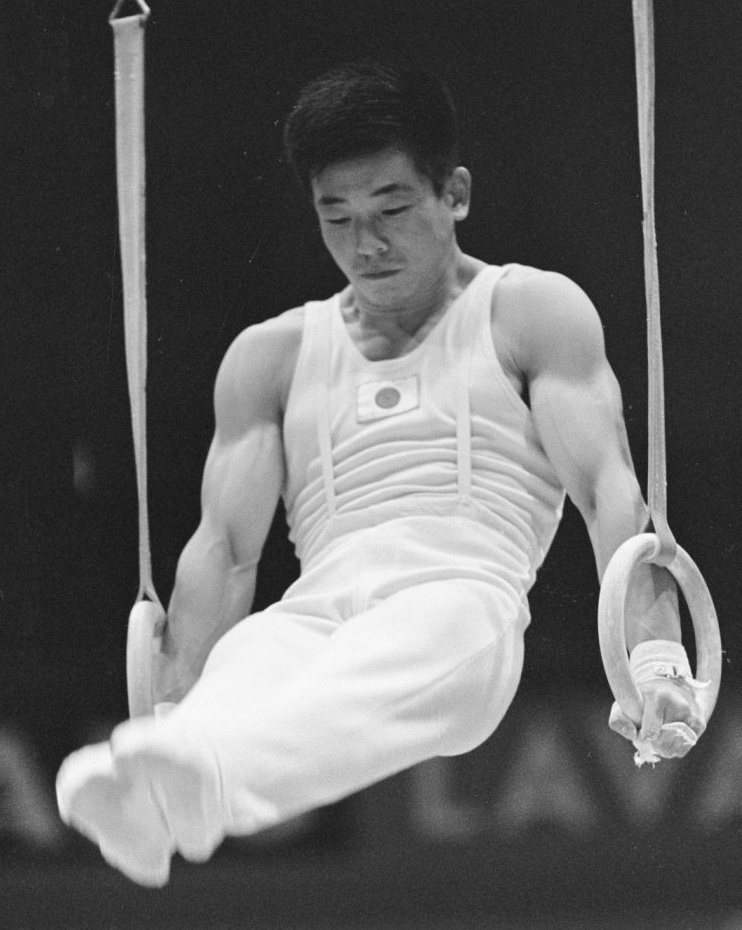
- Akinori Nakayama (at the 1966 world championships)
- Venue: Auditorio Nacional
- Dates: 22–26 October 1968
- Competitors: 117 from 28 nations
- Winning score: 19.450

Medalists
1st place, gold medalist(s)		Akinori Nakayama; Japan
2nd place, silver medalist(s)		Mikhail Voronin; Soviet Union
3rd place, bronze medalist(s)		Sawao Kato; Japan

The men's rings competition was one of eight events for male competitors in artistic gymnastics at the 1968 Summer Olympics in Mexico City. There were 117 competitors from 28 nations, with nations in the team competition having up to 6 gymnasts and other nations entering up to 3 gymnasts. The event was won by Akinori Nakayama of Japan, the nation's second consecutive victory in the rings event. Mikhail Voronin took silver to extend the Soviet Union's podium streak in the event to five Games, while Sawao Kato of Japan finished with bronze.

== Background ==
This was the 12th appearance of the event, which is one of the five apparatus events held every time there were apparatus events at the Summer Olympics (no apparatus events were held in 1900, 1908, 1912, or 1920). Two of the six finalists from 1964 returned: silver medalist Franco Menichelli of Italy and sixth-place finisher Yukio Endō of Japan. Menichelli had finished third at the 1966 World Championships behind Mikhail Voronin of the Soviet Union and Akinori Nakayama of Japan.

Ecuador and the Philippines each made their debut in the men's rings; East and West Germany competed separately for the first time. The United States made its 11th appearance, most of any nation, having missed only the inaugural 1896 Games.

== Competition format ==
Each nation entered a team of six gymnasts or up to three individual gymnasts. All entrants in the gymnastics competitions performed both a compulsory exercise and a voluntary exercise for each apparatus. The scores for all 12 exercises were summed to give an individual all-around score.

These exercise scores were also used for qualification for the new apparatus finals. The two exercises (compulsory and voluntary) for each apparatus were summed to give an apparatus score; the top 6 in each apparatus participated in the finals; others were ranked 7th through 117th. In the final, each gymnast performed an additional voluntary exercise; half of the score from the preliminary carried over.

== Schedule ==
All times are Central Standard Time (UTC-6)

Date	Time	Round
Tuesday, 22 October 1968	8:30; 17:00	Preliminary: Compulsory
Thursday, 24 October 1968	8:30; 17:00	Preliminary: Voluntary
Saturday, 26 October 1968	19:00	Final

== Results ==
Rank	Gymnast	Nation	Preliminary			Final		
Rank	Gymnast	Nation	Compulsory	Voluntary	Total	1/2 Prelim.	Final	Total
1st place, gold medalist(s)	Akinori Nakayama	Japan	9.75	9.75	19.50	9.750	9.700	19.450
2nd place, silver medalist(s)	Mikhail Voronin	Soviet Union	9.75	9.70	19.45	9.725	9.600	19.325
3rd place, bronze medalist(s)	Sawao Kato	Japan	9.70	9.85	19.55	9.775	9.450	19.225
4	Mitsuo Tsukahara	Japan	9.65	9.60	19.25	9.625	9.500	19.125
5	Takeshi Katō	Japan	9.70	9.70	19.40	9.700	9.350	19.050
6	Sergey Diomidov	Soviet Union	9.60	9.45	19.05	9.525	9.450	18.975
7	Eizo Kenmotsu	Japan	9.55	9.45	19.00	did not advance		
8	Yukio Endo	Japan	9.45	9.50	18.95	did not advance		
9	Steve Cohen	United States	9.30	9.60	18.90	did not advance		
9	Viktor Klimenko	Soviet Union	9.40	9.50	18.90	did not advance		
11	Klaus Köste	East Germany	9.40	9.40	18.80	did not advance		
11	Viktor Lisitsky	Soviet Union	9.40	9.40	18.80	did not advance		
13	Jiří Fejtek	Czechoslovakia	9.35	9.40	18.75	did not advance		
13	Mikołaj Kubica	Poland	9.30	9.45	18.75	did not advance		
15	Matthias Brehme	East Germany	9.30	9.40	18.70	did not advance		
15	Miroslav Cerar	Yugoslavia	9.30	9.40	18.70	did not advance		
17	Valery Ilyinykh	Soviet Union	9.30	9.30	18.60	did not advance		
17	Valery Karasyov	Soviet Union	9.45	9.15	18.60	did not advance		
17	Wilhelm Kubica	Poland	9.30	9.30	18.60	did not advance		
20	Hans Ettlin	Switzerland	9.20	9.35	18.55	did not advance		
20	Mauno Nissinen	Finland	9.30	9.25	18.55	did not advance		
22	Janez Brodnik	Yugoslavia	9.20	9.30	18.50	did not advance		
23	Siegfried Fülle	East Germany	9.05	9.40	18.45	did not advance		
23	Heikki Sappinen	Finland	9.20	9.25	18.45	did not advance		
25	Willi Jaschek	West Germany	9.10	9.30	18.40	did not advance		
25	Tine Šrot	Yugoslavia	9.20	9.20	18.40	did not advance		
27	Fred Roethlisberger	United States	9.15	9.20	18.35	did not advance		
28	Andrzej Gonera	Poland	9.00	9.30	18.30	did not advance		
28	Václav Kubíčka	Czechoslovakia	9.00	9.30	18.30	did not advance		
28	Gilbert Larose	Canada	9.00	9.30	18.30	did not advance		
28	Peter Weber	East Germany	9.00	9.30	18.30	did not advance		
32	Sid Jensen	Canada	9.05	9.20	18.25	did not advance		
32	Finn Johannesson	Sweden	9.10	9.15	18.25	did not advance		
32	Hannu Rantakari	Finland	9.10	9.15	18.25	did not advance		
32	Heiko Reinemer	West Germany	8.85	9.40	18.25	did not advance		
32	Aleksander Rokosa	Poland	9.05	9.20	18.25	did not advance		
32	Armando Valles	Mexico	9.05	9.20	18.25	did not advance		
38	Meinrad Berchtold	Switzerland	8.95	9.20	18.15	did not advance		
38	František Bočko	Czechoslovakia	8.95	9.20	18.15	did not advance		
38	Reino Heino	Finland	9.00	9.15	18.15	did not advance		
38	Erich Hess	West Germany	8.90	9.25	18.15	did not advance		
38	Milenko Kersnić	Yugoslavia	9.05	9.10	18.15	did not advance		
43	Luigi Cimnaghi	Italy	9.05	9.05	18.10	did not advance		
44	Gerhard Dietrich	East Germany	8.85	9.20	18.05	did not advance		
44	Sid Freudenstein	United States	8.90	9.15	18.05	did not advance		
44	Miloslav Netušil	Czechoslovakia	9.10	8.95	18.05	did not advance		
47	José Filipe Abreu	Portugal	8.95	9.05	18.00	did not advance		
47	Juhani Rahikainen	Finland	8.95	9.05	18.00	did not advance		
47	Dave Thor	United States	9.00	9.00	18.00	did not advance		
47	Endre Tihanyi	Hungary	8.80	9.20	18.00	did not advance		
51	Christer Jönsson	Sweden	8.90	9.05	17.95	did not advance		
52	Steve Hug	United States	8.80	9.10	17.90	did not advance		
52	Václav Skoumal	Czechoslovakia	8.95	8.95	17.90	did not advance		
54	Chung-tae Kim	South Korea	8.85	9.00	17.85	did not advance		
54	Paul Müller	Switzerland	8.85	9.00	17.85	did not advance		
54	Hans Peter Nielsen	Denmark	8.80	9.05	17.85	did not advance		
54	Peter Rohner	Switzerland	8.90	8.95	17.85	did not advance		
58	Bruno Franceschetti	Italy	8.80	9.00	17.80	did not advance		
58	Sylwester Kubica	Poland	8.75	9.05	17.80	did not advance		
60	István Aranyos	Hungary	8.70	9.00	17.70	did not advance		
60	Jerzy Kruża	Poland	8.90	8.80	17.70	did not advance		
60	Helmut Tepasse	West Germany	8.45	9.30	17.75	did not advance		
63	Georgi Adamov	Bulgaria	8.80	8.85	17.65	did not advance		
63	Giovanni Carminucci	Italy	8.75	8.90	17.65	did not advance		
63	Octavio Suárez	Cuba	8.80	8.85	17.65	did not advance		
63	Miloš Vratič	Yugoslavia	8.75	8.90	17.65	did not advance		
67	Edwin Greutmann	Switzerland	8.70	8.90	17.60	did not advance		
68	Günter Beier	East Germany	8.45	9.10	17.55	did not advance		
68	Rumen Gabrovski	Bulgaria	8.60	8.95	17.55	did not advance		
68	Christian Guiffroy	France	8.60	8.95	17.55	did not advance		
68	Heinz Häussler	West Germany	8.65	8.90	17.55	did not advance		
68	Hermann Höpfner	West Germany	8.45	9.10	17.55	did not advance		
68	Roland Hürzeler	Switzerland	8.50	9.05	17.55	did not advance		
68	José Vilchis	Mexico	8.55	9.00	17.55	did not advance		
75	Christian Deuza	France	8.90	8.60	17.50	did not advance		
75	Luis Ramírez	Cuba	8.55	8.95	17.50	did not advance		
77	Bohumil Mudřík	Czechoslovakia	8.25	9.10	17.35	did not advance		
77	Stefan Zoev	Bulgaria	8.65	8.70	17.35	did not advance		
79	Michel Bouchonnet	France	8.65	8.60	17.25	did not advance		
79	Pasquale Carminucci	Italy	8.70	8.55	17.25	did not advance		
81	Olli Laiho	Finland	8.00	9.20	17.20	did not advance		
82	Damir Anić	Yugoslavia	8.25	8.90	17.15	did not advance		
82	Jorge Rodríguez	Cuba	8.25	8.90	17.15	did not advance		
84	Bozhidar Ivanov	Bulgaria	8.65	8.45	17.10	did not advance		
84	Konrád Mentsik	Hungary	8.35	8.75	17.10	did not advance		
86	Davaanyam Zagdbazaryn	Mongolia	8.90	8.15	17.05	did not advance		
87	Arne Thomsen	Denmark	8.10	8.90	17.00	did not advance		
88	Rogelio Mendoza	Mexico	8.15	8.70	16.85	did not advance		
89	Murray Chessell	Australia	8.20	8.55	16.75	did not advance		
89	Ivan Kondev	Bulgaria	8.60	8.15	16.75	did not advance		
91	Raycho Khristov	Bulgaria	8.10	8.60	16.70	did not advance		
91	Sergio Luna	Ecuador	8.10	8.60	16.70	did not advance		
93	Evert Lindgren	Sweden	7.85	8.80	16.65	did not advance		
93	Stan Wild	Great Britain	8.45	8.20	16.65	did not advance		
95	Steve Mitruk	Canada	8.10	8.40	16.50	did not advance		
95	Vincenzo Mori	Italy	8.50	8.00	16.50	did not advance		
97	Barry Brooker	Canada	7.90	8.55	16.45	did not advance		
97	Héctor Ramírez	Cuba	7.85	8.60	16.45	did not advance		
99	Kanati Allen	United States	7.80	8.50	16.30	did not advance		
100	Roberto Pumpido	Cuba	7.85	8.40	16.25	did not advance		
101	Béla Herczeg	Hungary	7.20	8.85	16.05	did not advance		
102	Enrique García	Mexico	7.60	8.35	15.95	did not advance		
103	Sándor Kiss	Hungary	6.90	8.95	15.85	did not advance		
104	Dezső Bordán	Hungary	7.95	7.80	15.75	did not advance		
105	Fernando Valles	Mexico	7.75	7.85	15.60	did not advance		
106	Michael Booth	Great Britain	7.85	7.70	15.55	did not advance		
106	José González	Mexico	7.45	8.10	15.55	did not advance		
108	Chu-Long Lai	Taiwan	7.65	7.65	15.30	did not advance		
109	Roger Dion	Canada	6.15	8.25	14.40	did not advance		
110	Larbi Lazhari	Algeria	6.15	8.10	14.25	did not advance		
111	Eduardo Nájera	Ecuador	6.70	7.15	13.85	did not advance		
112	Fu Cheng	Taiwan	6.65	7.10	13.75	did not advance		
113	Luis Navarrete	Cuba	6.50	7.15	13.65	did not advance		
114	Pedro Rendón	Ecuador	5.50	6.95	12.45	did not advance		
115	Franco Menichelli	Italy	9.60	—	9.60	did not advance		
116	Norman Henson	Philippines	6.60	—	6.60	did not advance		
117	Ernesto Beren	Philippines	6.25	—	6.25	did not advance		
