= European Artistic Gymnastics Championships – Men's horizontal bar =

Men's horizontal bar has been staged at every European Men's Artistic Gymnastics Championships since 1955.

== Medalists ==
Year	Location	Gold	Silver	Bronze
1955	(West Germany) Frankfurt	Boris Shakhlin; Soviet Union	Albert Azaryan; Soviet Union	Jean Cronstedt; Sweden
1957	(France) Paris	Jack Günthard; Switzerland	Joaquín Blume; Spain	Yuri Titov; Soviet Union
1959	(Denmark) Copenhagen	Pavel Stolbov; Soviet Union	Yuri Titov; Soviet Union	Jean Cronstedt; Sweden; Otto Kestola; Finland
1961	Luxembourg	Yuri Titov; Soviet Union	Rajmund Csányi; Hungary	Otto Kestola; Finland
1963	(Socialist Federal Republic of Yugoslavia) Belgrade	Boris Shakhlin; Soviet Union; Miroslav Cerar; Yugoslavia	none awarded	Valery Kerdemelidi; Soviet Union
1965	(Belgium) Antwerp	Franco Menichelli; Italy	Viktor Lisitsky; Soviet Union	Sergey Diomidov; Soviet Union
1967	(Finland) Tampere	Viktor Lisitsky; Soviet Union	Mikhail Voronin; Soviet Union	Miroslav Cerar; Yugoslavia; Franco Menichelli; Italy
1969	(Poland) Varsovie	Viktor Lisitsky; Soviet Union; Viktor Klimenko; Soviet Union	none awarded	Miroslav Cerar; Yugoslavia
1971	(Spain) Madrid	Klaus Köste; East Germany	Mikhail Voronin; Soviet Union	Roland Hürzeler; Switzerland
1973	(France) Grenoble	Klaus Köste; East Germany; Eberhard Gienger; West Germany	none awarded	Wolfgang Thüne; East Germany
1975	(Switzerland) Bern	Nikolai Andrianov; Soviet Union; Eberhard Gienger; West Germany	none awarded	Andrzej Szajna; Poland
1977	(Soviet Union) Vilna	Stoyan Deltchev; Bulgaria	Aleksandr Tkachyov; Soviet Union; Vladimir Markelov; Soviet Union	none awarded
1979	(West Germany) Essen	Aleksandr Tkachyov; Soviet Union	Stoyan Deltchev; Bulgaria; Péter Kovács; Hungary	none awarded
1981	(Italy) Rome	Aleksandr Tkachyov; Soviet Union; Eberhard Gienger; West Germany	none awarded	Bohdan Makuts; Soviet Union
1983	(Bulgaria) Varna	Dmitry Bilozerchev; Soviet Union	Hubert Brylok; East Germany	Philippe Vatuone; France
1985	(Norway) Oslo	Dmitry Bilozerchev; Soviet Union; Zsolt Borkai; Hungary	none awarded	Marius Gherman; Romania
1987	(Soviet Union) Moscow	Valeri Liukin; Soviet Union	Sylvio Kroll; East Germany	György Guczoghy; Hungary
1989	(Sweden) Stockholm	Andreas Wecker; East Germany	Vitaly Marinich; Soviet Union; Nicusor Pascu; Romania	none awarded
1990	(Switzerland) Lausanne	Vitaly Scherbo; Soviet Union	Rene Pluss; Switzerland	Jože Kolman; Yugoslavia; Ralf Büchner; East Germany
1992	(Hungary) Budapest	Rustam Sharipov; Ukraine; Andreas Wecker; Germany	none awarded	Nicu Stroia; Romania
1994	(Czech Republic) Prague	Aljaž Pegan; Slovenia	Vitaly Scherbo; Belarus	Yevgeny Shabayev; Russia
1996	(Denmark) Broendby	Krasimir Dunev; Bulgaria; Aleksey Voropayev; Russia	none awarded	Vitaly Scherbo; Belarus; Oleksandr Svetlichny; Ukraine
1998	(Russia) Saint Petersburg	Jesús Carballo; Spain	Jari Monkkonen; Finland	Dmitri Nonin; Germany
2000	(Germany) Bremen	Oleksandr Beresch; Ukraine	Ivan Ivankov; Belarus	Aljaž Pegan; Slovenia
2002	(Greece) Patras	Vlasios Maras; Greece	Florent Marée; France	Igor Cassina; Italy
2004	(Slovenia) Ljubljana	Vlasios Maras; Greece; Aljaž Pegan; Slovenia	none awarded	Christoph Schaerer; Switzerland
2005	(Hungary) Debrecen	Fabian Hambüchen; Germany	Igor Cassina; Italy	Valeriy Honcharov; Ukraine
2006	(Greece) Volos	Vlasios Maras; Greece	Sergey Khorokhordin; Russia	Christoph Schaerer; Switzerland
2007	(Netherlands) Amsterdam	Fabian Hambüchen; Germany	Aljaž Pegan; Slovenia	Igor Cassina; Italy
2008	(Switzerland) Lausanne	Fabian Hambüchen; Germany	Vlasios Maras; Greece	Aljaž Pegan; Slovenia; Ümit Şamiloğlu; Turkey
2009	(Italy) Milan	Vlasios Maras; Greece	Yann Cucherat; France	Nikolai Kuksenkov; Ukraine
2010	(United Kingdom) Birmingham	Vlasios Maras; Greece	Epke Zonderland; Netherlands	Philipp Boy; Germany; Fabian Hambüchen; Germany
2011	(Germany) Berlin	Epke Zonderland; Netherlands	Philipp Boy; Germany	Marcel Nguyen; Germany
2012	(France) Montpellier	Emin Garibov; Russia	Marijo Možnik; Croatia	Vlasios Maras; Greece
2013	(Russia) Moscow	Emin Garibov; Russia	Sam Oldham; Great Britain	Aleksandr Tsarevich; Belarus
2014	(Bulgaria) Sofia	Epke Zonderland; Netherlands	Sam Oldham; Great Britain	Kristian Thomas; Great Britain
2015	(France) Montpellier	Marijo Možnik; Croatia	Sam Oldham; Great Britain	Vlasios Maras; Greece
2016	(Switzerland) Bern	Nile Wilson; Great Britain	Kristian Thomas; Great Britain	David Belyavskiy; Russia
2017	(Romania) Cluj-Napoca	Pablo Brägger; Switzerland	Oliver Hegi; Switzerland	David Belyavskiy; Russia
2018	(United Kingdom) Glasgow	Oliver Hegi; Switzerland	Epke Zonderland; Netherlands	Dávid Vecsernyés; Hungary
2019	(Poland) Szczecin	Epke Zonderland; Netherlands	Tin Srbić; Croatia	Artur Dalaloyan; Russia
2020	(Turkey) Mersin	Robert Tvorogal; Lithuania	Tin Srbić; Croatia	Alexander Myakinin; Israel
2021	(Switzerland) Basel	David Belyavskiy; Russia	Andreas Toba; Germany	Adem Asil; Turkey
2022	(Germany) Munich	Marios Georgiou; Cyprus	Robert Tvorogal; Lithuania	Joel Plata; Spain
2023	(Turkey) Antalya	Tin Srbić; Croatia	Carlo Macchini; Italy	Illia Kovtun; Ukraine
2024	(Italy) Rimini	Illia Kovtun; Ukraine	Robert Tvorogal; Lithuania	Marios Georgiou; Cyprus
2025	(Germany) Leipzig	Robert Tvorogal; Lithuania	Andreas Toba; Germany	Anthony Mansard; France
2026	(Croatia) Zagreb	Joe Fraser; Great Britain	Marios Georgiou; Cyprus	Savelii Sieedin

== Medal table ==
Rank	Nation	Gold	Silver	Bronze	Total
1	Soviet Union	14	8	4	26
2	Greece (GRE)	5	1	2	8
3	Germany (GER)	4	3	4	11
4	Russia (RUS)	4	1	4	9
5	Switzerland (SUI)	3	2	3	8
6	East Germany	3	2	2	7
7	Netherlands (NED)	3	2	0	5
8	Ukraine (UKR)	3	0	4	7
9	West Germany	3	0	0	3
10	Great Britain (GBR)	2	4	1	7
11	Croatia (CRO)	2	3	0	5
12	Lithuania (LTU)	2	2	0	4
13	Slovenia (SLO)	2	1	2	5
14	Bulgaria (BUL)	2	1	0	3
15	Italy (ITA)	1	2	3	6
16	Hungary (HUN)	1	2	2	5
17	Cyprus (CYP)	1	1	1	3
17	Spain (ESP)	1	1	1	3
19	Yugoslavia	1	0	3	4
20	Belarus (BLR)	0	2	2	4
20	France (FRA)	0	2	2	4
22	Finland (FIN)	0	1	2	3
22	Romania (ROU)	0	1	2	3
24	Sweden (SWE)	0	0	2	2
24	Turkey (TUR)	0	0	2	2
26	Israel (ISR)	0	0	1	1
26	Poland (POL)	0	0	1	1
Totals (27 entries)		57	42	50	149

Notes

- Does not include bronze medal won in 2026 won by World Gymnastics 2, the designation under which Russian gymnasts were allowed to compete at those championships.
