= 1966 World Artistic Gymnastics Championships =

Gymnastics competition

- Location: Dortmund, West Germany

The 16th Artistic Gymnastics World Championships were held in Dortmund, West Germany, in 1966. During these championships, new elements were performed including a full-twisting piked dismount from high bar, a layout with full turn (rings), and a double somersault.

== Results ==
| Event | Gold | Silver | Bronze |
|---|---|---|---|
Men
| Team all-around | Japan; Shuji Tsurumi; Akinori Nakayama; Takeshi Katō; Yukio Endo; Takashi Mitsukuri; Haruhiro Matsuda | Soviet Union; Mikhail Voronin; Sergei Diomidov; Valery Kerdemelidi; Yuri Titov; Valery Karasev; Boris Shakhlin | East Germany; Matthias Brehme; Gerhard Dietrich; Werner Dolling; Erwin Koppe; Siegfried Fülle; Peter Weber |
| Individual all-around | (Soviet Union) Mikhail Voronin | (Japan) Shuji Tsurumi | (Japan) Akinori Nakayama |
| Floor | (Japan) Akinori Nakayama | (Japan) Yukio Endo | (Italy) Franco Menichelli |
| Pommel horse | (Socialist Federal Republic of Yugoslavia) Miroslav Cerar | (Soviet Union) Mikhail Voronin | (Japan) Takeshi Katō |
| Rings | (Soviet Union) Mikhail Voronin | (Japan) Akinori Nakayama | (Italy) Franco Menichelli |
| Vault | (Japan) Haruhiro Matsuda | (Japan) Takeshi Katō | (Japan) Akinori Nakayama |
| Parallel bars | (Soviet Union) Sergei Diomidov | (Soviet Union) Mikhail Voronin | (Socialist Federal Republic of Yugoslavia) Miroslav Cerar |
| Horizontal bar | (Japan) Akinori Nakayama | (Japan) Yukio Endo | (Japan) Takashi Mitsukuri |
Women
| Team all-around | Czechoslovakia; Věra Čáslavská; Jaroslava Sedláčková; Marianna Krajčírová; Jana Kubičková; Bohumila Řimnáčová; Jindra Košťálová | Soviet Union; Natalia Kuchinskaya; Larisa Petrik; Zinaida Druzhinina; Larisa Latynina; Polina Astakhova; Olga Kharlova | Japan; Keiko Ikeda; Taki Shibuya; Hiroko Ikenada; Taniko Mitsukuri; Yasuko Furuyama; Mitsuko Kandori |
| Individual all-around | (Czechoslovakia) Věra Čáslavská | (Soviet Union) Natalia Kuchinskaya | (Japan) Keiko Ikeda |
| Vault | (Czechoslovakia) Věra Čáslavská | (East Germany) Erika Zuchold | (Soviet Union) Natalia Kuchinskaya |
| Uneven bars | (Soviet Union) Natalia Kuchinskaya | (Japan) Keiko Ikeda | (Japan) Taniko Mitsukuri |
| Balance beam | (Soviet Union) Natalia Kuchinskaya | (Czechoslovakia) Věra Čáslavská | (Soviet Union) Larisa Petrik |
| Floor | (Soviet Union) Natalia Kuchinskaya | (Czechoslovakia) Věra Čáslavská | (Soviet Union) Zinaida Druzhinina |

== Medals ==
| Rank | Nation | Gold | Silver | Bronze | Total |
|---|---|---|---|---|---|
| 1 | Soviet Union (URS) | 6 | 5 | 3 | 14 |
| 2 | Japan (JPN) | 4 | 6 | 7 | 17 |
| 3 | Czechoslovakia (TCH) | 3 | 2 | 0 | 5 |
| 4 | Yugoslavia (YUG) | 1 | 0 | 1 | 2 |
| 5 | East Germany (GDR) | 0 | 1 | 1 | 2 |
| 6 | Italy (ITA) | 0 | 0 | 2 | 2 |
| Totals (6 entries) | | 14 | 14 | 14 | 42 |

== Men ==
=== Team competition ===
| Rank | Team | Compulsory | Optional | Total |
|---|---|---|---|---|
| 1st place, gold medalist(s) | Japan | 287.850 | 287.300 | 575.150 |
| 2nd place, silver medalist(s) | Soviet Union | 285.900 | 285.000 | 570.900 |
| 3rd place, bronze medalist(s) | East Germany | 278.800 | 282.200 | 561.000 |
| 4 | Czechoslovakia | 275.800 | 275.400 | 551.200 |
| 5 | Poland | 274.200 | 276.400 | 550.600 |
| 6 | United States | 273.850 | 276.550 | 550.400 |
| 7 | Yugoslavia | 271.400 | 276.750 | 548.150 |
| 8 | West Germany | 273.200 | 274.800 | 548.000 |
| 9 | Italy | 273.450 | 272.550 | 546.000 |
| 10 | France | 272.350 | 272.900 | 545.250 |
| 11 | Finland | 267.750 | 273.750 | 541.700 |
| 12 | Sweden | 270.600 | 270.500 | 541.100 |
| 13 | Hungary | 262.150 | 268.100 | 530.250 |
| 14 | Norway | 258.100 | 266.850 | 524.950 |
| 15 | Cuba | 256.850 | 257.350 | 514.200 |
| 16 | Spain | 252.350 | 259.300 | 511.650 |
| 17 | Great Britain | 253.850 | 255.200 | 509.050 |
| 18 | Canada | 243.800 | 254.950 | 498.750 |
| 19 | Austria | 242.550 | 250.100 | 492.650 |
| 20 | New Zealand | 212.050 | 217.100 | 429.150 |

=== All-around ===
| Rank | Gymnast | Compulsory | Optional score | Total |
|---|---|---|---|---|
| 1st place, gold medalist(s) | Mikhail Voronin (URS) | 57.900 | 58.250 | 116.150 |
| 2nd place, silver medalist(s) | Shuji Tsurumi (JPN) | 57.750 | 57.500 | 115.250 |
| 3rd place, bronze medalist(s) | Akinori Nakayama (JPN) | 57.000 | 57.960 | 114.950 |
| 4 | Miroslav Cerar (YUG) | 57.150 | 57.600 | 114.750 |
| 5 | Franco Menichelli (ITA) | 57.200 | 57.450 | 114.650 |
| 6 | Takashi Kato (JPN) | 57.150 | 57.450 | 114.600 |
| 7 | Yukio Endo (JPN) | 57.550 | 56.800 | 114.350 |
| 8 | Takashi Mitsukuri (JPN) | 57.100 | 57.000 | 114.100 |
| 9 | Matthias Brehme (GDR) | 56.750 | 57.300 | 114.050 |
| 10 | Haruhiro Matsuda (JPN) | 57.250 | 56.600 | 113.850 |
| 11 | Sergei Diomidov (URS) | 57.600 | 55.650 | 113.250 |
| 12 | Valery Kerdemelidi (URS) | 56.450 | 56.450 | 112.900 |

=== Floor Exercise ===
| Rank | Gymnast | Score | Prelim score | Total |
|---|---|---|---|---|
| 1st place, gold medalist(s) | Akinori Nakayama (JPN) | 9.750 | 9.650 | 19.400 |
| 2nd place, silver medalist(s) | Yukio Endo (JPN) | 9.700 | 9.675 | 19.375 |
| 3rd place, bronze medalist(s) | Franco Menichelli (ITA) | 9.650 | 9.650 | 19.300 |
| 4 | Takeshi Katō (JPN) | 9.650 | 9.575 | 19.225 |
| 5 | Valery Karasyov (URS) | 9.450 | 9.550 | 19.000 |
| 6 | Shuji Tsurumi (JPN) | 9.300 | 9.575 | 18.875 |

=== Pommel Horse ===
| Rank | Gymnast | Score | Prelim score | Total |
|---|---|---|---|---|
| 1st place, gold medalist(s) | Miroslav Cerar (YUG) | 9.800 | 9.725 | 19.525 |
| 2nd place, silver medalist(s) | Mikhail Voronin (URS) | 9.700 | 9.625 | 19.325 |
| 3rd place, bronze medalist(s) | Takeshi Katō (JPN) | 9.600 | 9.525 | 19.125 |
| 4 | Matthias Brehme (GDR) | 9.500 | 9.525 | 19.025 |
| 5 | Shuji Tsurumi (JPN) | 9.500 | 9.500 | 19.000 |
| 6 | Olli Laiho (FIN) | 9.250 | 9.550 | 18.800 |

=== Rings ===
| Rank | Gymnast | Score | Prelim score | Total |
|---|---|---|---|---|
| 1st place, gold medalist(s) | Mikhail Voronin (URS) | 9.900 | 9.850 | 19.750 |
| 2nd place, silver medalist(s) | Akinori Nakayama (JPN) | 9.750 | 9.750 | 19.500 |
| 3rd place, bronze medalist(s) | Franco Menichelli (ITA) | 9.800 | 9.675 | 19.475 |
| 4 | Takeshi Katō (JPN) | 9.650 | 9.650 | 19.300 |
| 5 | Sergei Diomidov (URS) | 9.550 | 9.650 | 19.200 |
| 6 | Shuji Tsurumi (JPN) | 3.000 | 9.650 | 12.650 |

=== Vault ===
| Rank | Gymnast | Score | Prelim score | Total |
|---|---|---|---|---|
| 1st place, gold medalist(s) | Haruhiro Matsuda (JPN) | 9.675 | 9.750 | 19.425 |
| 2nd place, silver medalist(s) | Takeshi Katō (JPN) | 9.650 | 9.675 | 19.325 |
| 3rd place, bronze medalist(s) | Akinori Nakayama (JPN) | 9.500 | 9.550 | 19.050 |
| 4 | Yukio Endo (JPN) | 9.125 | 9.575 | 18.700 |
| 5 | Mikhail Voronin (URS) | 9.100 | 9.550 | 18.650 |
| 6 | Shuji Tsurumi (JPN) | 0.000 | 9.600 | 9.600 |

=== Parallel Bars ===
| Rank | Gymnast | Score | Prelim score | Total |
|---|---|---|---|---|
| 1st place, gold medalist(s) | Sergei Diamidov (URS) | 9.750 | 9.800 | 19.550 |
| 2nd place, silver medalist(s) | Mikhail Voronin (URS) | 9.700 | 9.700 | 19.400 |
| 3rd place, bronze medalist(s) | Miroslav Cerar (YUG) | 9.700 | 9.650 | 19.350 |
| 4 | Franco Menichelli (ITA) | 9.600 | 9.625 | 19.225 |
| 5 | Matthias Brehme (GDR) | 9.600 | 9.600 | 19.200 |
| 6 | Shuji Tsurumi (JPN) | 0.000 | 9.625 | 9.625 |

=== Horizontal Bar ===
| Rank | Gymnast | Score | Prelim score | Total |
|---|---|---|---|---|
| 1st place, gold medalist(s) | Akinori Nakayama (JPN) | 9.900 | 9.775 | 19.675 |
| 2nd place, silver medalist(s) | Yukio Endo (JPN) | 9.800 | 9.800 | 19.600 |
| 3rd place, bronze medalist(s) | Takashi Mitsukuri (JPN) | 9.700 | 9.725 | 19.425 |
| 4 | Miroslav Cerar (YUG) | 9.700 | 9.700 | 19.400 |
| 4 | Mikhail Voronin (URS) | 9.700 | 9.700 | 19.400 |
| 6 | Shuji Tsurumi (JPN) | 0.000 | 9.675 | 9.675 |

== Women ==
=== Team competition ===
| Rank | Team | Compulsory | Optional | Total |
|---|---|---|---|---|
| 1st place, gold medalist(s) | Czechoslovakia | 190.995 | 192.630 | 383.625 |
| 2nd place, silver medalist(s) | Soviet Union | 191.358 | 192.229 | 383.587 |
| 3rd place, bronze medalist(s) | Japan | 190.894 | 190.029 | 380.923 |
| 4 | East Germany | 187.494 | 190.324 | 377.818 |
| 5 | Hungary | 186.527 | 187.362 | 373.889 |
| 6 | United States | 182.360 | 185.260 | 367.620 |
| 7 | France | 183.193 | 183.225 | 366.418 |
| 8 | Bulgaria | 182.694 | 183.661 | 366.355 |
| 9 | Sweden | 181.429 | 181.662 | 363.091 |
| 10 | West Germany | 181.093 | 181.859 | 362.952 |
| 11 | Poland | 180.526 | 182.394 | 362.920 |
| 12 | Norway | 173.127 | 179.962 | 252.089 |
| 13 | Yugoslavia | 174.125 | 175.528 | 349.653 |
| 14 | Netherlands | 172.660 | 176.328 | 348.988 |
| 15 | Canada | 173.461 | 172.693 | 346.154 |
| 16 | Israel | 168.662 | 174.660 | 343.322 |
| 17 | Great Britain | 165.293 | 173.360 | 338.653 |
| 18 | New Zealand | 168.459 | 169.893 | 338.352 |
| 19 | South Africa | 168.693 | 166.761 | 335.454 |
| 20 | Cuba | 168.894 | 165.026 | 333.920 |
| 21 | Finland | 166.061 | 166.295 | 332.356 |
| 22 | Austria | 161.228 | 168.825 | 330.053 |

=== All-around ===
| Rank | Gymnast | Compulsory | Optional score | Total |
|---|---|---|---|---|
| 1st place, gold medalist(s) | Věra Čáslavská (TCH) | 39.032 | 39.266 | 78.298 |
| 2nd place, silver medalist(s) | Natalia Kuchinskaya (URS) | 38.865 | 39.232 | 78.097 |
| 3rd place, bronze medalist(s) | Keiko Ikeda (JPN) | 38.599 | 38.398 | 76.997 |
| 4 | Erika Zuchold (GDR) | 38.265 | 38.331 | 76.596 |
| 5 | Jaroslava Sedláčková (TCH) | 38.099 | 38.366 | 76.465 |
| 6 | Larisa Petrik (URS) | 37.966 | 38.400 | 76.366 |
| 7 | Marianna Némethová-Krajčírová (TCH) | 37.999 | 38.222 | 76.332 |
| 8 | Jana Kubičková (TCH) | 37.933 | 38.299 | 76.232 |
| 9 | Taki Shibuya (JPN) | 38.232 | 37.933 | 76.165 |
| 10 | Zinaida Druzhinina (URS) | 37.831 | 38.333 | 76.164 |
| 11 | Larisa Latynina (URS) | 38.099 | 37.999 | 76.098 |
| 12 | Hiroko Ikenada (JPN) | 38.266 | 37.733 | 75.999 |

=== Vault ===
| Rank | Gymnast | Score | Prelim score | Total |
|---|---|---|---|---|
| 1st place, gold medalist(s) | Věra Čáslavská (TCH) | 9.783 | 9.750 | 19.583 |
| 2nd place, silver medalist(s) | Erika Zuchold (GDR) | 9.733 | 9.666 | 19.399 |
| 3rd place, bronze medalist(s) | Natalia Kuchinskaya (URS) | 9.666 | 9.650 | 19.316 |
| 4 | Ute Starke (GDR) | 9.666 | 9.550 | 19.216 |
| 5 | Jana Kubičková (TCH) | 9.633 | 9.566 | 19.199 |
| 6 | Hiroko Ikenada (JPN) | 9.600 | 9.550 | 19.150 |

=== Uneven Bars ===
| Rank | Gymnast | Score | Prelim score | Total |
|---|---|---|---|---|
| 1st place, gold medalist(s) | Natalia Kuchinskaya (URS) | 9.800 | 9.816 | 19.616 |
| 2nd place, silver medalist(s) | Keiko Ikeda (JPN) | 9.766 | 9.800 | 19.566 |
| 3rd place, bronze medalist(s) | Taniko Mitsukuri (JPN) | 9.800 | 9.716 | 19.516 |
| 4 | Věra Čáslavská (TCH) | 9.666 | 9.816 | 19.482 |
| 5 | Polina Astakhova (URS) | 9.700 | 9.716 | 19.146 |
| 6 | Taki Shibuya (JPN) | 9.600 | 9.733 | 19.333 |

=== Balance Beam ===
| Rank | Gymnast | Score | Prelim score | Total |
|---|---|---|---|---|
| 1st place, gold medalist(s) | Natalia Kuchinskaya (URS) | 9.900 | 9.750 | 19.650 |
| 2nd place, silver medalist(s) | Věra Čáslavská (TCH) | 9.600 | 9.733 | 19.333 |
| 3rd place, bronze medalist(s) | Larisa Petrik (URS) | 9.600 | 9.650 | 19.250 |
| 4 | Keiko Ikeda (JPN) | 9.700 | 9.533 | 19.233 |
| 5 | Anikó Ducza-Jánosi (HUN) | 9.633 | 9.600 | 19.233 |
| 6 | Jaroslava Sedláčková (TCH) | 9.600 | 9.583 | 19.183 |

=== Floor Exercise ===
| Rank | Gymnast | Score | Prelim score | Total |
|---|---|---|---|---|
| 1st place, gold medalist(s) | Natalia Kuchinskaya (URS) | 9.900 | 9.833 | 19.733 |
| 2nd place, silver medalist(s) | Věra Čáslavská (TCH) | 9.833 | 9.850 | 19.683 |
| 3rd place, bronze medalist(s) | Zinaida Druzhinina (URS) | 9.933 | 9.733 | 19.666 |
| 4 | Larisa Petrik (URS) | 9.766 | 9.650 | 19.416 |
| 5 | Jana Kubičková (TCH) | 9.700 | 9.663 | 19.363 |
| 6 | Yasuko Furuyama (JPN) | 9.666 | 9.650 | 19.316 |
