= Miroslav Cerar =

Miroslav Cerar may refer to:

- Miroslav Cerar (gymnast) (born 1938), Slovenian lawyer, gymnast and Olympic gold medalist and father of Miroslav Cerar Jr.
- Miroslav Cerar (politician) (born 1963), Slovenian lawyer and politician, son of Miroslav Cerar Sr.
