= Přemysl Krbec =

Czech gymnast (1940–2021)

- Born: 28 January 1940 Litovel, Protectorate of Bohemia and Moravia
- Died: 31 August 2021 (aged 81)

Gymnastics career
- Country represented: Czechoslovakia
Medal record
Representing Czechoslovakia
World Championships
Gold medal – first place	1962 Prague	Vault
European championships
Gold medal – first place	1963 Belgrade	Vault

Přemysl Krbec (28 January 1940 – 31 August 2021) was a Czech gymnast. He was born in Litovel, Bohemia and Moravia, Germany, and competed for Czechoslovakia in the 1964 Summer Olympics. His strongest event was the vault and he was the world champion in 1962 and European champion in 1963 in the discipline.
