= Jaroslava Sedláčková =

Czech Olympic gymnast

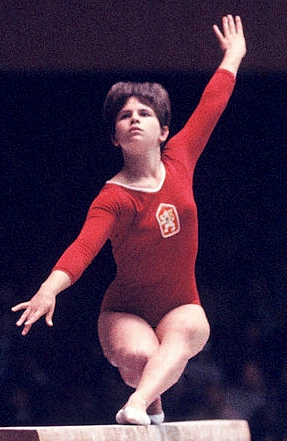
- Sedláčková at the 1964 Olympics

Personal information
- Born: 21 June 1946 (age 80) Lenešice, Czechoslovakia
- Height: 1.58 m (5 ft 2 in)

Gymnastics career
Medal record
Women's artistic gymnastics
Representing Czechoslovakia
Olympic Games
Silver medal – second place	1964 Tokyo	Team
World Championships
Gold medal – first place	1966 Dortmund	Team

Jaroslava Sedláčková (born 21 June 1946) is a Czech former gymnast. She won a silver medal in the team competition at the 1964 Summer Olympics. Individually she finished 7th on the balance beam, 8th on uneven bars and 11th all around.
