= Lenešice =

- Municipality
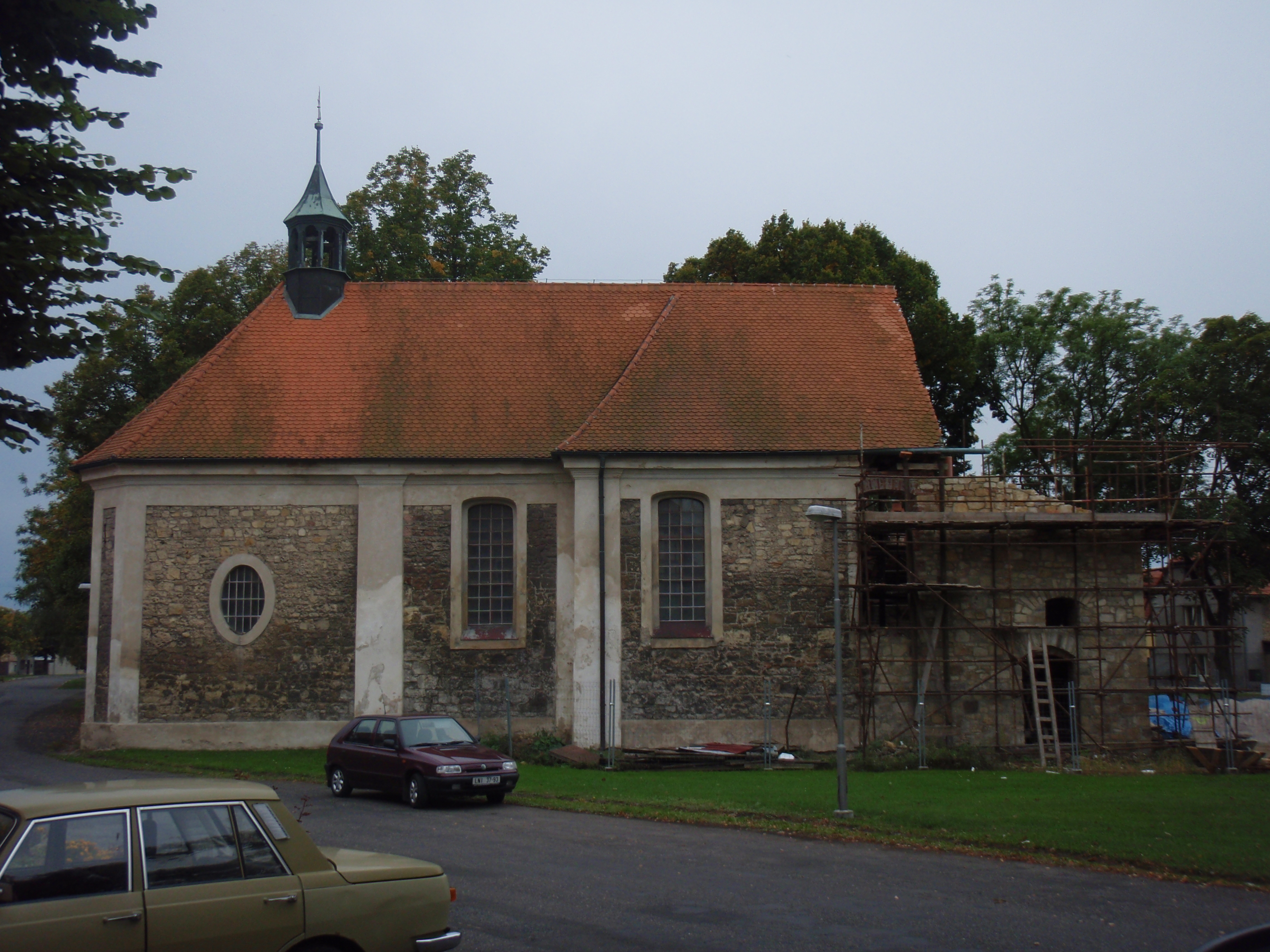
- Church of Saints Simon and Jude

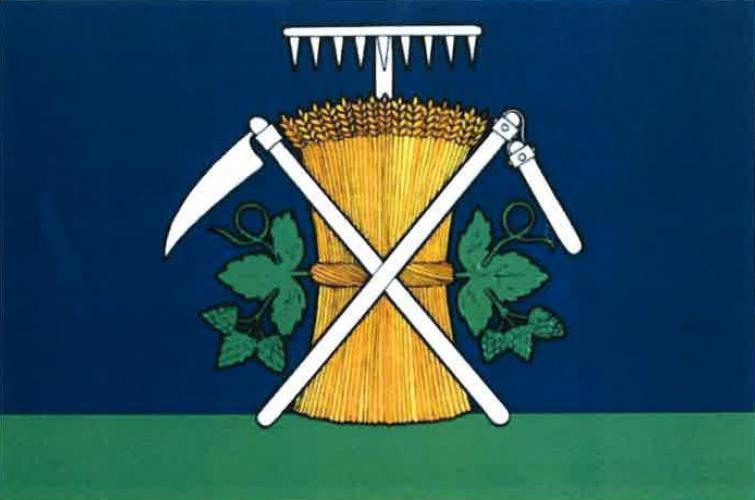
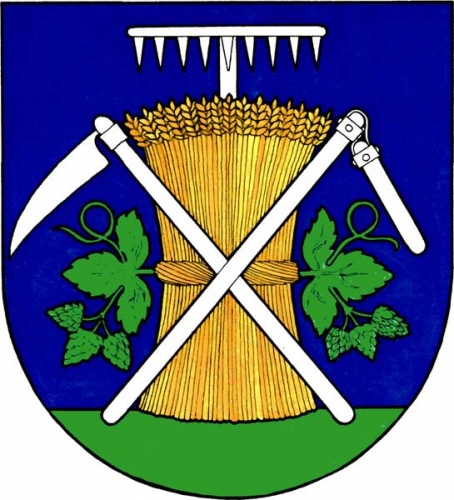
- Flag Coat of arms

- Location in the Czech Republic
- Coordinates: 50°22′31″N 13°45′58″E
- Country: Czech Republic
- Region: Ústí nad Labem
- District: Louny
- First mentioned: 1226

Area
  - Total: 13.73 km^{2} (5.30 sq mi)
- Elevation: 182 m (597 ft)

Population (2026-01-01)
  - Total: 1,406
  - Density: 102.4/km^{2} (265.2/sq mi)
- Time zone: UTC+1 (CET)
  - Summer (DST): UTC+2 (CEST)
- Postal code: 439 23
- Website: www.ou-lenesice.cz

Lenešice (German: Leneschitz) is a municipality and village in Louny District in the Ústí nad Labem Region of the Czech Republic. It has about 1,400 inhabitants.

Lenešice lies approximately 4 kilometres (2 mi) north-west of Louny, 37 km (23 mi) south-west of Ústí nad Labem, and 57 km (35 mi) north-west of Prague.

== Demographics ==
Historical population
Year	Pop.	±%
1869	882	—
1880	1,466	+66.2%
1890	1,790	+22.1%
1900	1,856	+3.7%
1910	2,018	+8.7%
1921	2,141	+6.1%
1930	2,539	+18.6%
1950	1,779	−29.9%
1961	1,779	+0.0%
1970	1,591	−10.6%
1980	1,379	−13.3%
1991	1,206	−12.5%
2001	1,313	+8.9%
2011	1,401	+6.7%
2021	1,366	−2.5%
Source: Censuses

== Notable people ==
- Jaroslava Sedláčková (born 1946), gymnast, Olympic medalist
