= 1967 European Men's Artistic Gymnastics Championships =

7th European Men's Artistic Gymnastics Championships
- Location: Tampere, Finland
- Start date: 25 May 1967
- End date: 26 May 1967

The 7th European Men's Artistic Gymnastics Championships was held in Tampere, Finland from 25–26 May 1967.

== Medalists ==
Event	Gold	Silver	Bronze
All-around	(Soviet Union) Mikhail Voronin	(Soviet Union) Viktor Lisitsky	(Italy) Franco Menichelli
Floor	(Finland) Olli Laiho	(Italy) Franco Menichelli	(Poland) Mikołaj Kubica
Pommel horse	(Soviet Union) Mikhail Voronin	(Socialist Federal Republic of Yugoslavia) Miroslav Cerar	(East Germany) Gerhard Dietrich
Rings	(Soviet Union) Viktor Lisitsky (Soviet Union) Mikhail Voronin	Not awarded	(Poland) Mikołaj Kubica
Vault	(Soviet Union) Viktor Lisitsky	(Bulgaria) Georgi Adamov	(East Germany) Gerhard Dietrich
Parallel bars	(Soviet Union) Mikhail Voronin	(Italy) Franco Menichelli	(Italy) Giovanni Carminucci
Horizontal bar	(Soviet Union) Viktor Lisitsky	(Soviet Union) Mikhail Voronin	(Socialist Federal Republic of Yugoslavia) Miroslav Cerar (Italy) Franco Menichelli

=== Medal table ===
Rank	Nation	Gold	Silver	Bronze	Total
1	Soviet Union (URS)	7	2	0	9
2	Finland (FIN)	1	0	0	1
3	Italy (ITA)	0	2	3	5
4	Yugoslavia (YUG)	0	1	1	2
5	Bulgaria (BUL)	0	1	0	1
6	East Germany (GDR)	0	0	2	2
6	Poland (POL)	0	0	2	2
Totals (7 entries)		8	6	8	22
