= 1969 European Men's Artistic Gymnastics Championships =

8th European Men's Artistic Gymnastics Championships
- Location: Warsaw, Poland
- Start date: 24 May 1969
- End date: 25 May 1969

The 8th European Men's Artistic Gymnastics Championships was held in Warsaw, Poland from 24–25 May 1969.

== Medalists ==
Event	Gold	Silver	Bronze
All-around	(Soviet Union) Mikhail Voronin	(Soviet Union) Viktor Klimenko	(Poland) Mikołaj Kubica
Floor	(Bulgaria) Raycho Khristov	(Soviet Union) Viktor Lisitsky	(Poland) Sylwester Kubica
Pommel horse	(Socialist Federal Republic of Yugoslavia) Miroslav Cerar (Poland) Wilhelm Kubica	Not awarded	(Soviet Union) Mikhail Voronin
Rings	(Soviet Union) Mikhail Voronin	(Soviet Union) Viktor Klimenko (Poland) Mikołaj Kubica	Not awarded
Vault	(Soviet Union) Viktor Klimenko	(Poland) Mikołaj Kubica (Soviet Union) Mikhail Voronin	Not awarded
Parallel bars	(Soviet Union) Mikhail Voronin	(Socialist Federal Republic of Yugoslavia) Miroslav Cerar (Soviet Union) Viktor Klimenko	Not awarded
Horizontal bar	(Soviet Union) Viktor Klimenko (Soviet Union) Viktor Lisitsky	Not awarded	(Socialist Federal Republic of Yugoslavia) Miroslav Cerar

=== Medal table ===
Rank	Nation	Gold	Silver	Bronze	Total
1	Soviet Union (URS)	6	5	1	12
2	Poland (POL)	1	2	2	5
3	Yugoslavia (YUG)	1	1	1	3
4	Bulgaria (BUL)	1	0	0	1
Totals (4 entries)		9	8	4	21
