= Takashi Kato =

Japanese handball player (born 1989)

Personal information
- Nationality: Japanese
- Born: 30 October 1989 (age 36)
- Height: 1.88 m (6 ft 2 in)

Sport
- Sport: Handball
- Position: Pivot
- Current club: Daido Steel
National team
Years	Team	Apps	(Gls)
–	Japan	35	(34)

Takashi Kato (加藤 嵩士, Katō Takashi; born 30 October 1989) is a Japanese handball player for Daido Steel and the Japanese national team.

He participated at the 2017 World Men's Handball Championship.
