= Raycho Khristov =

Bulgarian artistic gymnast (born 1945)

- Райчо Тодоров Христов
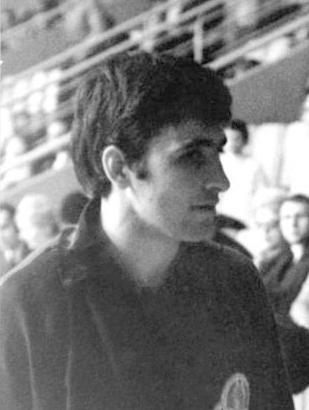
- Khristov in 1971

Personal information
- Full name: Raycho Todorov Hristov
- Born: 4 October 1945 (age 80) Haskovo, Bulgaria
- Height: 1.71 m (5 ft 7 in)

Gymnastics career
- Discipline: Men's artistic gymnastics
- Country represented: Bulgaria
Medal record
Representing Bulgaria
European Championships
Gold medal – first place	1969 Warsaw	Floor exercise
Gold medal – first place	1971 Madrid	Floor exercise

Raycho Todorov Hristov (Bulgarian: Райчо Тодоров Христов; born 4 October 1945) is a retired Bulgarian gymnast. He competed at the 1968 Summer Olympics in all artistic gymnastics events and finished 11th with the Bulgarian team. His best individual achievement was ninth place on the floor.
