= Georgi Mirtchev =

Bulgarian gymnast (born 1939)

Georgi Adamov
- Георги Мирчев Адамов
- Full name: Georgi Mirchev Adamov
- Born: 3 June 1939 (age 87) Sofia, Bulgaria
- Height: 1.73 m (5 ft 8 in)

Gymnastics career
- Discipline: Men's artistic gymnastics
- Country represented: Bulgaria
Medal record
Representing Bulgaria
European Championships
Silver medal – second place	1965 Antwerp	Vault
Silver medal – second place	1967 Tampere	Vault

Georgi Mirchev Adamov (Bulgarian: Георги Мирчев Адамов) (born 3 June 1939) is a Bulgarian gymnast. He competed in the 1964 and 1968 Summer Olympics.
