= Valery Karasyov =

Russian gymnast (born 1946)

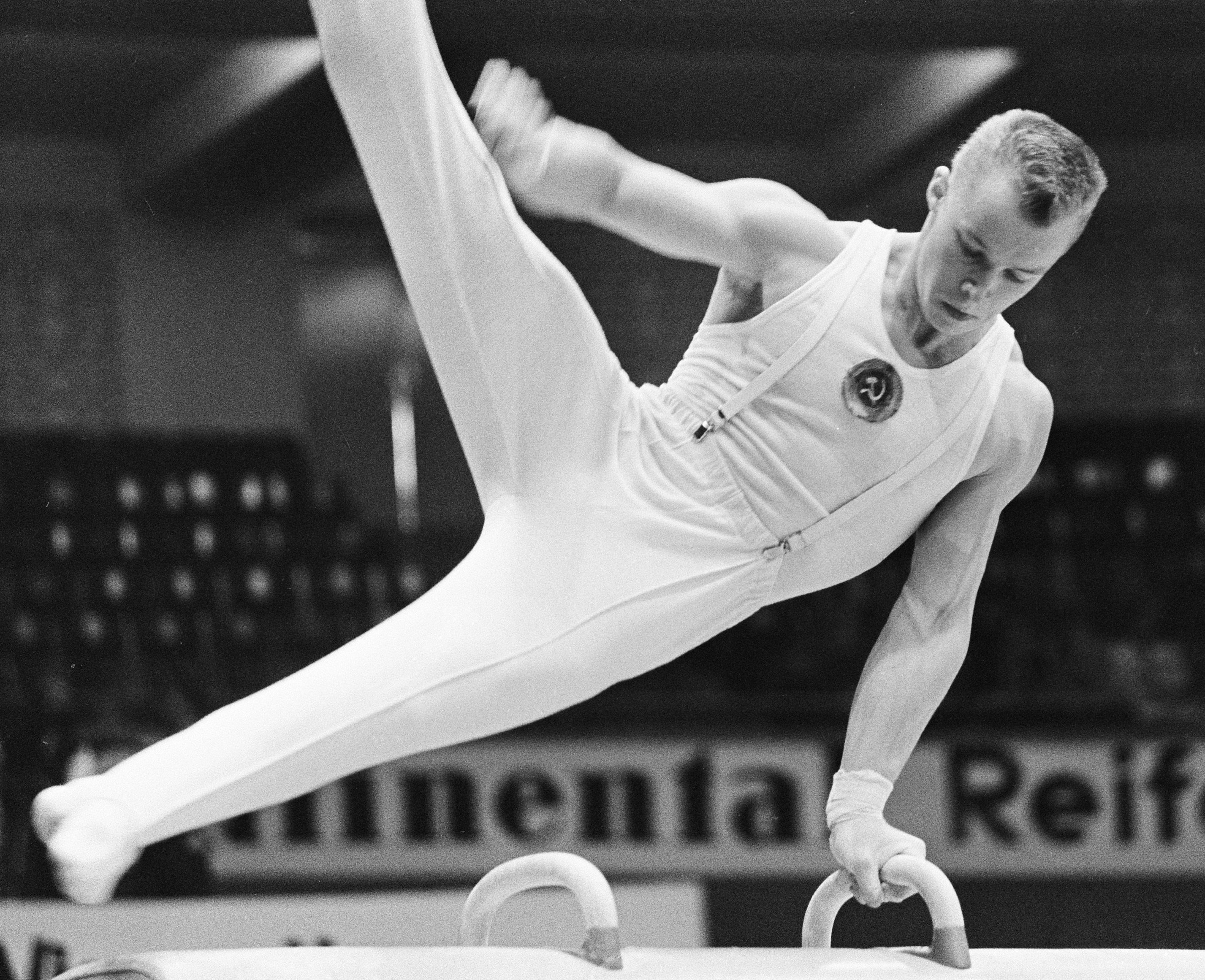
- Karasyov at the 1966 World Championships

Personal information
- Born: 23 September 1946 (age 79) Moscow, Russian SFSR, Soviet Union
- Height: 1.68 m (5 ft 6 in)
- Spouse: Olga Karasyova

Gymnastics career
- Discipline: Men's artistic gymnastics
- Country represented: Soviet Union
- Club: Trud Moscow
Medal record
Olympic Games
| Silver medal – second place | 1968 Mexico City | Team |
World Championships
| Silver medal – second place | 1966 Dortmund | Team |
| Silver medal – second place | 1970 Ljubljana | Team |

Valery Nikolayevich Karasyov (Russian: Валерий Николаевич Карасёв; born 23 September 1946) is a retired Russian gymnast. He competed at the 1968 Summer Olympics in all artistic gymnastics events and won a silver medal in the team competition. Individually his best result was fifth place in the floor exercise. At the world championships Karasyov won team silver medals in 1966 and 1970. He married Olga Karasyova, a Russian gymnast who also competed at the 1968 Olympics.
