= Gerhard Dietrich =

East German gymnast (1942–2024)

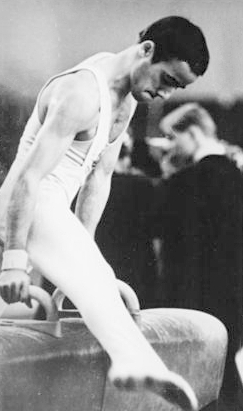
- Dietrich in 1968

Personal information
- Born: 12 May 1942 Brandenburg an der Havel, Nazi Germany
- Died: 9 March 2024 (aged 81) Brandenburg an der Havel, Germany
- Height: 1.63 m (5 ft 4 in)

Gymnastics career
- Discipline: Men's artistic gymnastics
- Country represented: East Germany
- Club: ASK Vorwärts Potsdam
Medal record
Representing East Germany
Olympic Games
| Bronze medal – third place | 1968 Mexico City | Team |
World Championships
| Bronze medal – third place | 1966 Dortmund | Team |
| Bronze medal – third place | 1970 Ljubljana | Team |
European Championships
| Bronze medal – third place | 1967 Tampere | Vault |
| Bronze medal – third place | 1967 Tampere | Pommel horse |

Gerhard Dietrich (12 May 1942 – 9 March 2024) was a German gymnast. He competed at the 1968 Summer Olympics in all artistic gymnastics events and won a bronze medal with the East German team. Individually, his best achievement was 20th place on the pommel horse. He won four more bronze medals at the World Championships in 1966 and 1970 and European Championships in 1967.
