= Mikołaj Kubica =

Polish gymnast (1945–2020)

- Born: 27 October 1945 Niedobczyce, Poland's Provisional Government of National Unity
- Died: 19 July 2020 (aged 74)
- Height: 1.70 m (5 ft 7 in)
- Relatives: Sylwester Kubica (brother); Wilhelm Kubica (brother)

Gymnastics career
- Discipline: Men's artistic gymnastics
- Country represented: Poland
- Club: Górnik Radlin
Medal record
Representing Poland
European Championships
| Silver medal – second place | 1969 Warsaw | Rings |
| Silver medal – second place | 1969 Warsaw | Vault |
| Bronze medal – third place | 1967 Tampere | Floor exercise |
| Bronze medal – third place | 1967 Tampere | Rings |
| Bronze medal – third place | 1969 Warsaw | All-around |

Mikołaj Kubica (27 October 1945 – 19 July 2020) was a Polish gymnast. He competed at the 1964 Summer Olympics, the 1968 Summer Olympics and the 1972 Summer Olympics.
