= Wilhelm Kubica =

Polish gymnast

- Born: 29 December 1943 (age 82) Niedobczyce, Nazi Germany
- Height: 1.68 m (5 ft 6 in)
- Relatives: Mikołaj Kubica (brother); Sylwester Kubica (brother)

Gymnastics career
- Discipline: Men's artistic gymnastics
- Country represented: Poland
- Club: Górnik Radlin
Medal record
Representing Poland
European Championships
Gold medal – first place	1969 Warsaw	Pommel horse

Wilhelm Kubica (born 29 December 1943) is a Polish gymnast. He competed at the 1964 Summer Olympics, the 1968 Summer Olympics and the 1972 Summer Olympics.
