= Sylwester Kubica =

Polish gymnast (1949–2018)

- Born: 28 December 1949 Niedobczyce, Polish People's Republic
- Died: 9 June 2018 (aged 68)
- Height: 1.69 m (5 ft 7 in)
- Relatives: Mikołaj Kubica (brother); Wilhelm Kubica (brother)

Gymnastics career
- Discipline: Men's artistic gymnastics
- Country represented: Poland
- Club: Górnik Radlin
Medal record
Representing Poland
European Championships
Bronze medal – third place	1969 Warsaw	Floor exercise

Sylwester Kubica (28 December 1949 – 9 June 2018) was a Polish gymnast. He competed at the 1968 Summer Olympics and the 1972 Summer Olympics.
