= 1965 European Men's Artistic Gymnastics Championships =

6th European Men's Artistic Gymnastics Championships
- Location: Antwerp, Belgium
- Start date: 15 May 1965
- End date: 16 May 1965

The 6th European Men's Artistic Gymnastics Championships was held in Antwerp, Belgium from 15–16 May 1965.

== Medalists ==
Event	Gold	Silver	Bronze
All-around	(Italy) Franco Menichelli	(Soviet Union) Viktor Lisitsky	(Soviet Union) Sergey Diomidov
Floor	(Italy) Franco Menichelli	(Socialist Federal Republic of Yugoslavia) Miroslav Cerar (Soviet Union) Viktor Lisitsky	Not awarded
Pommel horse	(Soviet Union) Viktor Lisitsky	(Socialist Federal Republic of Yugoslavia) Miroslav Cerar	(Soviet Union) Sergey Diomidov (Finland) Olli Laiho
Rings	(Soviet Union) Viktor Lisitsky (Italy) Franco Menichelli	Not awarded	(Socialist Federal Republic of Yugoslavia) Miroslav Cerar
Vault	(Soviet Union) Viktor Lisitsky	(Bulgaria) Georgi Adamov (Finland) Raimo Heinonen (Norway) Åge Storhaug	Not awarded
Parallel bars	(Socialist Federal Republic of Yugoslavia) Miroslav Cerar	(Italy) Franco Menichelli	(Soviet Union) Sergey Diomidov (East Germany) Erwin Koppe
Horizontal bar	(Italy) Franco Menichelli	(Soviet Union) Viktor Lisitsky	(Soviet Union) Sergey Diomidov

=== Medal table ===
Rank	Nation	Gold	Silver	Bronze	Total
1	Italy (ITA)	4	1	0	5
2	Soviet Union (URS)	3	3	4	10
3	Yugoslavia (YUG)	1	2	1	4
4	Finland (FIN)	0	1	1	2
5	Bulgaria (BUL)	0	1	0	1
5	Norway (NOR)	0	1	0	1
7	East Germany (GDR)	0	0	1	1
Totals (7 entries)		8	9	7	24
