= Franco Menichelli =

Italian artistic gymnast (1941–2026)

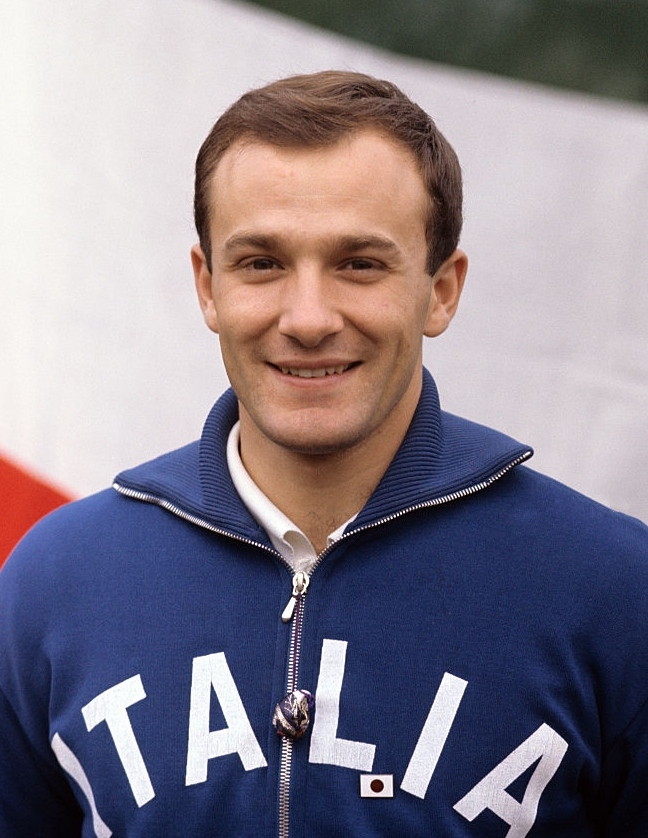
- Menichelli at the 1964 Olympics

Personal information
- Born: 3 August 1941 Rome, Italy
- Died: 28 January 2026 (aged 84)
- Height: 163 cm (5 ft 4 in)

Gymnastics career
- Discipline: Men's artistic gymnastics
- Country represented: Italy
- Club: Associazione Ginnastica Romana
- Retired: 1968
Medal record
Representing Italy
Olympic Games
Gold medal – first place	1964 Tokyo	Floor exercise
Silver medal – second place	1964 Tokyo	Rings
Bronze medal – third place	1960 Rome	Floor exercise
Bronze medal – third place	1960 Rome	Team
Bronze medal – third place	1964 Tokyo	Parallel bars
World Championships
Bronze medal – third place	1962 Prague	Floor exercise
Bronze medal – third place	1966 Dortmund	Floor exercise
Bronze medal – third place	1966 Dortmund	Rings
European Championships
Gold medal – first place	1961 Luxembourg	Floor exercise
Gold medal – first place	1963 Belgrade	Floor exercise
Gold medal – first place	1965 Antwerp	All-around
Gold medal – first place	1965 Antwerp	Floor exercise
Gold medal – first place	1965 Antwerp	Rings
Gold medal – first place	1965 Antwerp	Horizontal bar
Silver medal – second place	1961 Luxembourg	Vault
Silver medal – second place	1965 Antwerp	Parallel bars
Silver medal – second place	1967 Tampere	Floor exercise
Silver medal – second place	1967 Tampere	Parallel bars
Bronze medal – third place	1961 Luxembourg	Parallel bars
Bronze medal – third place	1963 Belgrade	Parallel bars
Bronze medal – third place	1967 Tampere	All-around
Bronze medal – third place	1967 Tampere	Horizontal bar

Franco Menichelli (3 August 1941 – 28 January 2026) was an Italian gymnast. He competed in all artistic gymnastics events at the 1960, 1964, and 1968 Olympics and won one gold, one silver, and three bronze medals.

== Biography ==
Menichelli was most successful in 1964, when he won a gold on the floor, a silver on rings, and a bronze on parallel bars. He severely injured an Achilles tendon on landing during the floor exercise at the 1968 Olympics, and retired shortly thereafter. From 1973 to 1979 he coached the national gymnastics team. In 2003 he was inducted into the International Gymnastics Hall of Fame.

Menichelli died on 28 January 2026, at the age of 84. His brother Giampaolo Menichelli was an international football player.

== Awards ==
On 7 May 2015, in the presence of the President of Italian National Olympic Committee (CONI), Giovanni Malagò, he was he was entered into in the Olympic Park of the Foro Italico in Rome, along Viale delle Olimpiadi, the Walk of Fame of Italian sport, consisting of 100 tiles that chronologically report names of the most representative athletes in the history of Italian sport. On each tile are the names of the sportsmen, the sport in which he distinguished himself and the symbol of CONI. One of these tiles is now dedicated to Franco Menichelli.
