= Olli Laiho =

Finnish gymnast

- Full name: Olli Eino Laiho
- Born: 18 February 1943 Savonlinna, Finland
- Died: 31 May 2010 (aged 67) Helsinki, Finland

Gymnastics career
- Discipline: Men's artistic gymnastics
- Country represented: Finland
Medal record
Men's artistic gymnastics
Representing Finland
Olympic Games
Silver medal – second place	1968 Mexico City	Pommel horse
European Championships
Gold medal – first place	1967 Tampere	Floor exercise
Bronze medal – third place	1965 Antwerp	Pommel horse

Olli Eino Laiho (18 February 1943, in Savonlinna – 31 May 2010, in Helsinki) was a Finnish gymnast who competed in the 1964 Summer Olympics and in the 1968 Summer Olympics.
