= Viktor Lisitsky =

Soviet gymnast (1939–2023)

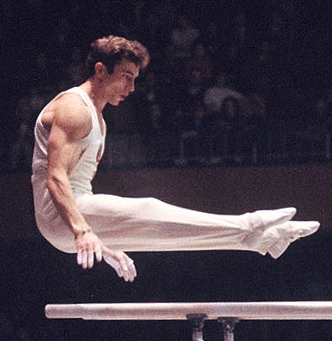
- Lisitsky at the 1964 Olympics

Personal information
- Born: 13 October 1939 Magnitogorsk, Chelyabinsk Oblast, Russian SFSR, USSR
- Died: 13 June 2023 (aged 83) Moscow, Russia
- Height: 1.69 m (5 ft 7 in)

Gymnastics career
- Discipline: Men's artistic gymnastics
- Country represented: Soviet Union
- Club: Army Club, Moscow
Medal record
Representing the Soviet Union
Olympic Games
Silver medal – second place	1964 Tokyo	Team
Silver medal – second place	1964 Tokyo	All-around
Silver medal – second place	1964 Tokyo	Floor
Silver medal – second place	1964 Tokyo	Vault
Silver medal – second place	1968 Mexico City	Team
World Championships
Silver medal – second place	1962 Prague	Team
Silver medal – second place	1970 Ljubljana	Team
European Championships
Gold medal – first place	1965 Antwerp	Rings
Gold medal – first place	1965 Antwerp	Vault
Gold medal – first place	1965 Antwerp	Pommel horse
Gold medal – first place	1967 Tampere	Rings
Gold medal – first place	1967 Tampere	Vault
Gold medal – first place	1967 Tampere	Horizontal bar
Gold medal – first place	1969 Warsaw	Horizontal bar
Silver medal – second place	1965 Antwerp	All-around
Silver medal – second place	1965 Antwerp	Floor
Silver medal – second place	1965 Antwerp	Horizontal bar
Silver medal – second place	1967 Tampere	All-around
Silver medal – second place	1969 Warsaw	Floor

Viktor Nikitovich Lisitsky (Russian: Ви́ктор Ники́тович Лиси́цкий; 18 October 1939 – 13 June 2023) was a Russian gymnast. He competed in all artistic gymnastics events at the 1964 and 1968 Summer Olympics and won five silver medals, three individual in 1964 and two with the Soviet team, in 1964 and 1968.

At the European championships Lisitsky won three titles in 1965 (rings, vault and pommel horse), three in 1967 (rings, vault and horizontal bar), and one in 1969 (horizontal bar), and finished second five times. At the World championships, he only won two team silver medals, in 1962 and 1970. Domestically, he won 15 Soviet titles (1964 and 1966 in individual all-around; 1964–65, 1967, 1969-70 in floor exercise, 1965 and 1968 on rings, 1964-66 on vault and 1966–67, 1969 on horizontal bar). After retiring from competitions, he coached gymnastics at his Army Sports club in Moscow. He then was appointed professor and head of the physical education department of Mendeleyev Russian University of Chemistry and Technology. Lisitsky was an avid painter and was a member of the Union of Russian Artists.

Lisitsky died on 13 June 2023, at the age of 83.
