= Sergey Diomidov =

Uzbekistani artistic gymnast (1943–2024)

- Сергей Викторович Диомидов
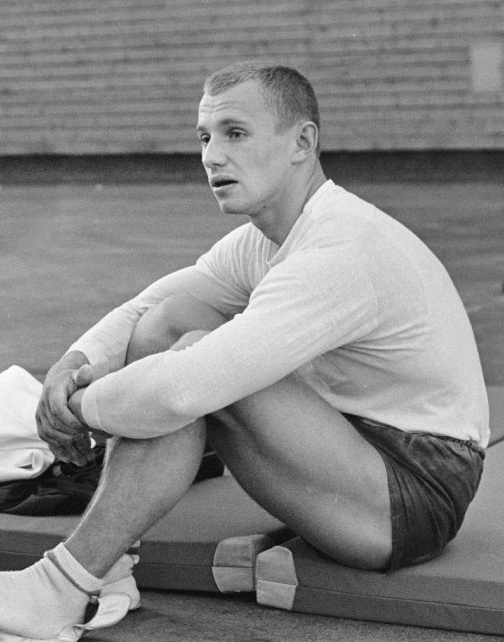
- Sergey Diomidov in 1966

Personal information
- Full name: Sergey Viktorovich Diomidov
- Born: 9 July 1943 Turtkul, Karakalpak ASSR, Uzbek SSR, Soviet Union
- Died: 10 March 2024 (aged 80)
- Height: 1.72 m (5 ft 8 in)

Gymnastics career
- Discipline: Men's artistic gymnastics
- Country represented: Soviet Union
- Club: Vooruzhyonnykh Sily Toshkent
- Eponymous skills: Diomidov (parallel bars)
Medal record
Men's artistic gymnastics
Representing Soviet Union
Olympic Games
Silver medal – second place	1964 Tokyo	Team
Silver medal – second place	1968 Mexico City	Team
Bronze medal – third place	1968 Mexico City	Vault
World Championships
Gold medal – first place	1966 Dortmund	Parallel bars
Silver medal – second place	1966 Dortmund	Team
Silver medal – second place	1970 Ljubljana	Team
European Championships
Bronze medal – third place	1965 Antwerp	All-around
Bronze medal – third place	1965 Antwerp	Pommel horse
Bronze medal – third place	1965 Antwerp	Parallel bars
Bronze medal – third place	1965 Antwerp	Horizontal bar

Sergey Viktorovich Diomidov (Russian: Сергей Викторович Диомидов; 9 July 1943 – 10 March 2024) was a Soviet gymnast who competed in the 1964 Summer Olympics and in the 1968 Summer Olympics. He won team silver medals at both Games and a bronze on the vault in 1968.

Diomidov invented a skill on parallel bars.

== Biography ==
Between 1961 and 1967, Diomidov trained at the Army Forces Club in Tashkent, Uzbekistan. In 1968, he moved to Moscow where he was coached by Konstantin Karakashyants at the CSKA club. He retired in 1972 and held a rank of lieutenant colonel. Diomidov died on 10 March 2024, at the age of 80.

== Gymnastics competition history ==
Apart from his Olympic team medals, he was part of two silver medal teams at world championships, in 1966 and 1970; at the 1966 championships, he also won the gold on parallel bars. In addition, he earned several medals at USSR and European championships.

== Parallel bars skill ==
The "Diamidov" is a move on parallel bars. It consists of a swing down from handstand, through support, then releasing one hand and twisting the body a full turn, before regrasping in handstand. It is similar to the Stutz handstand, with the difference being that the Stutz involves a half turn only, but release of both hands.

Execution of the Diamidov

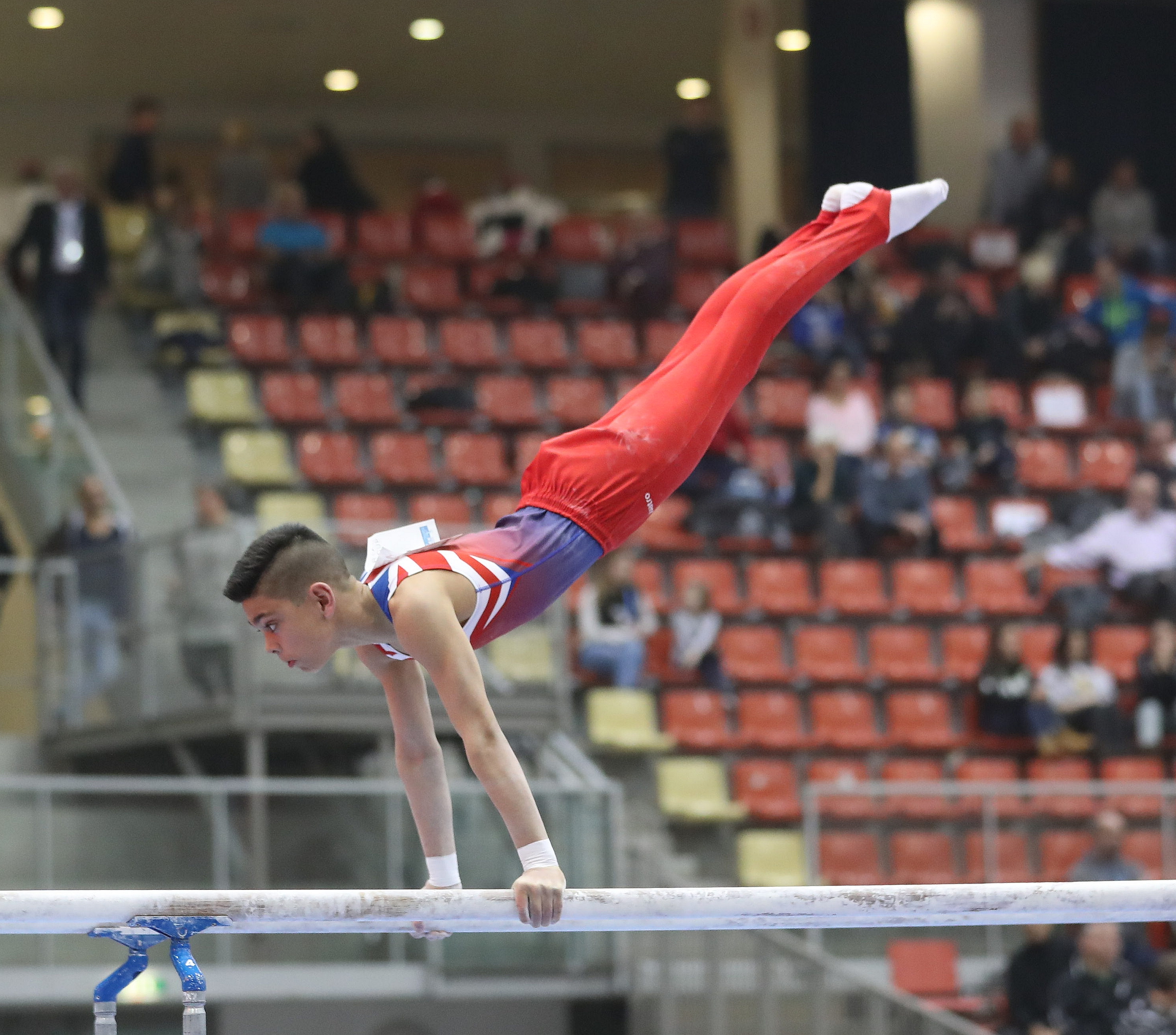
Performed by a young gymnast at the Austrian Future Cup 2018

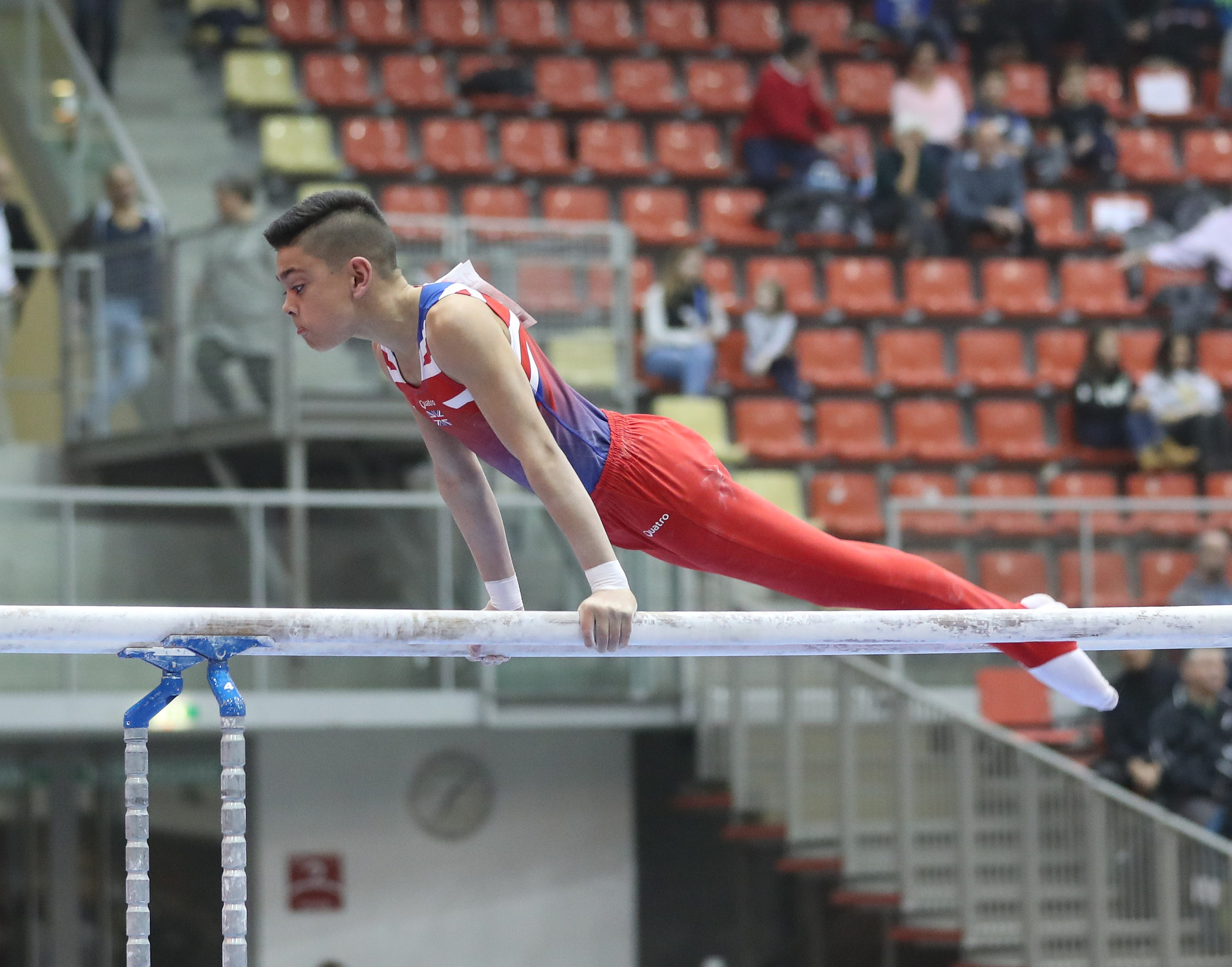

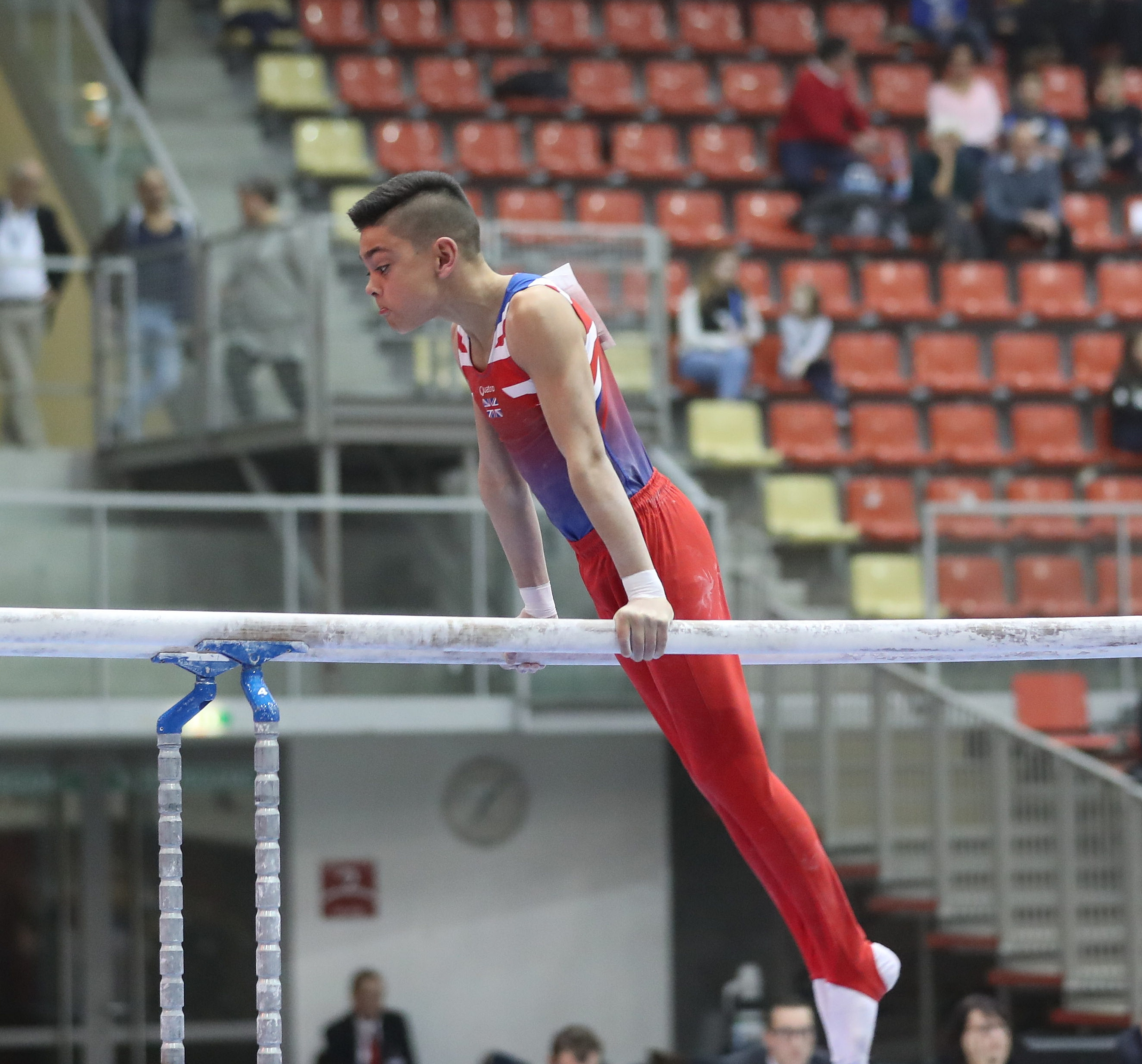

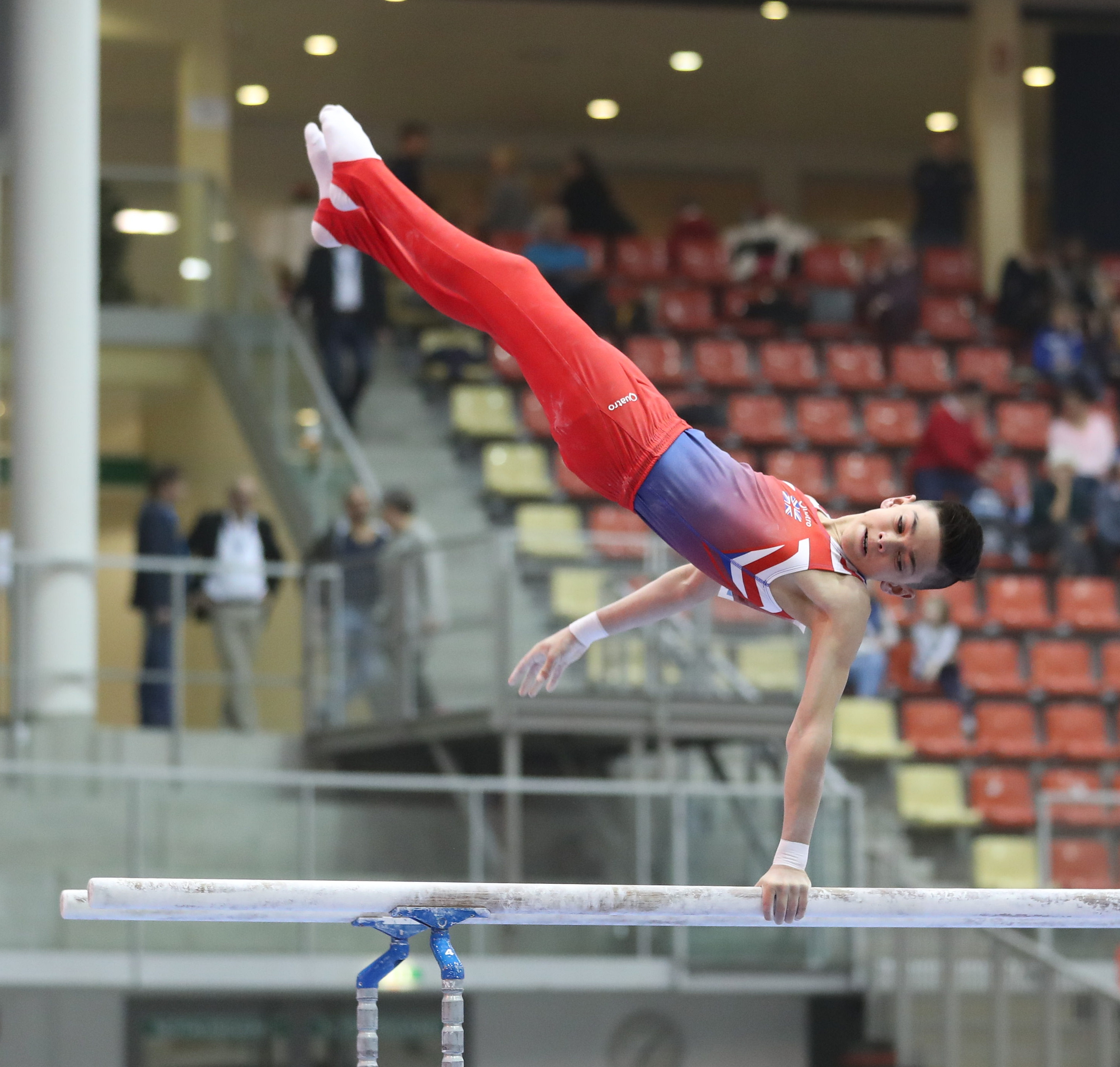

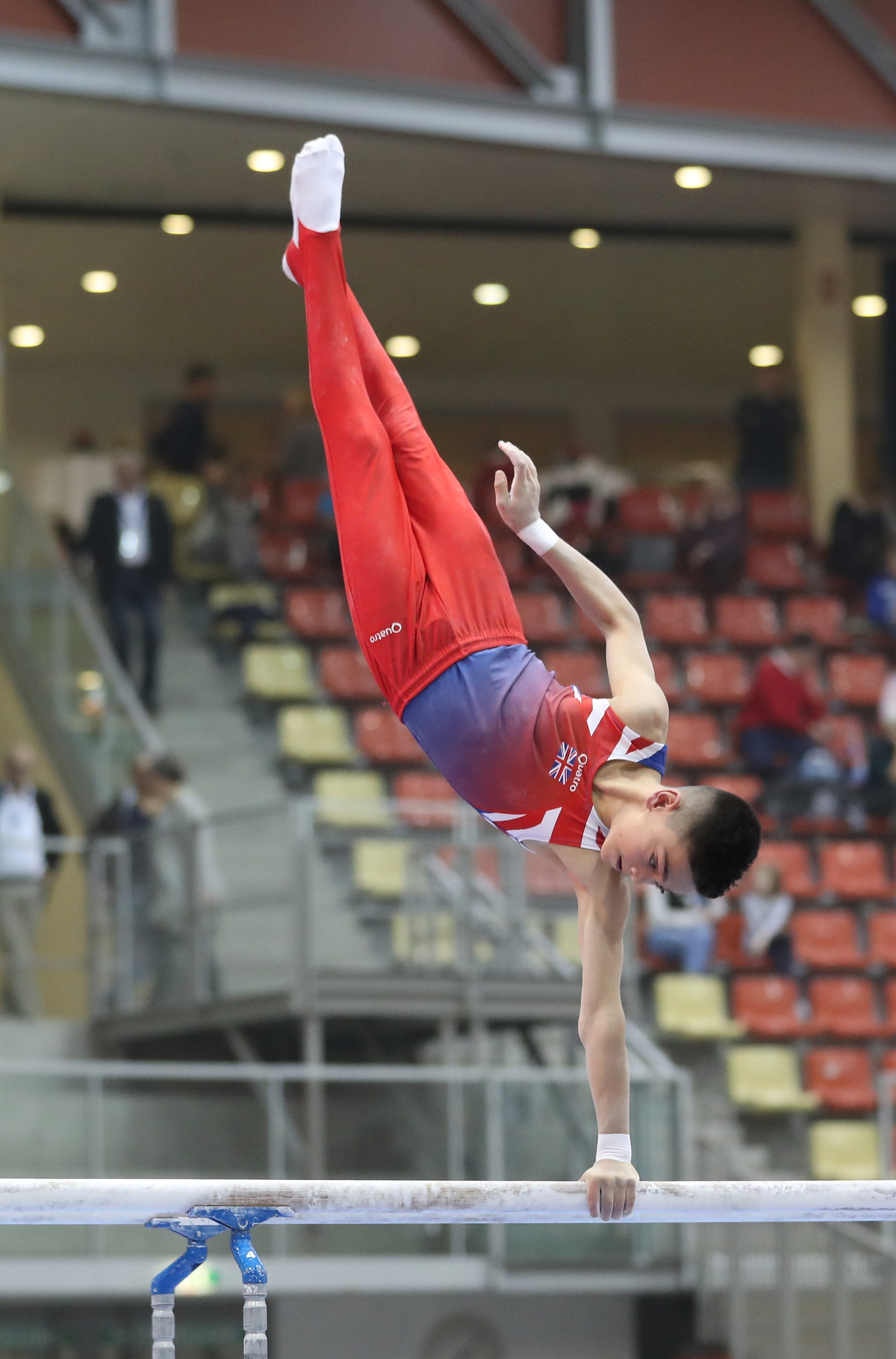

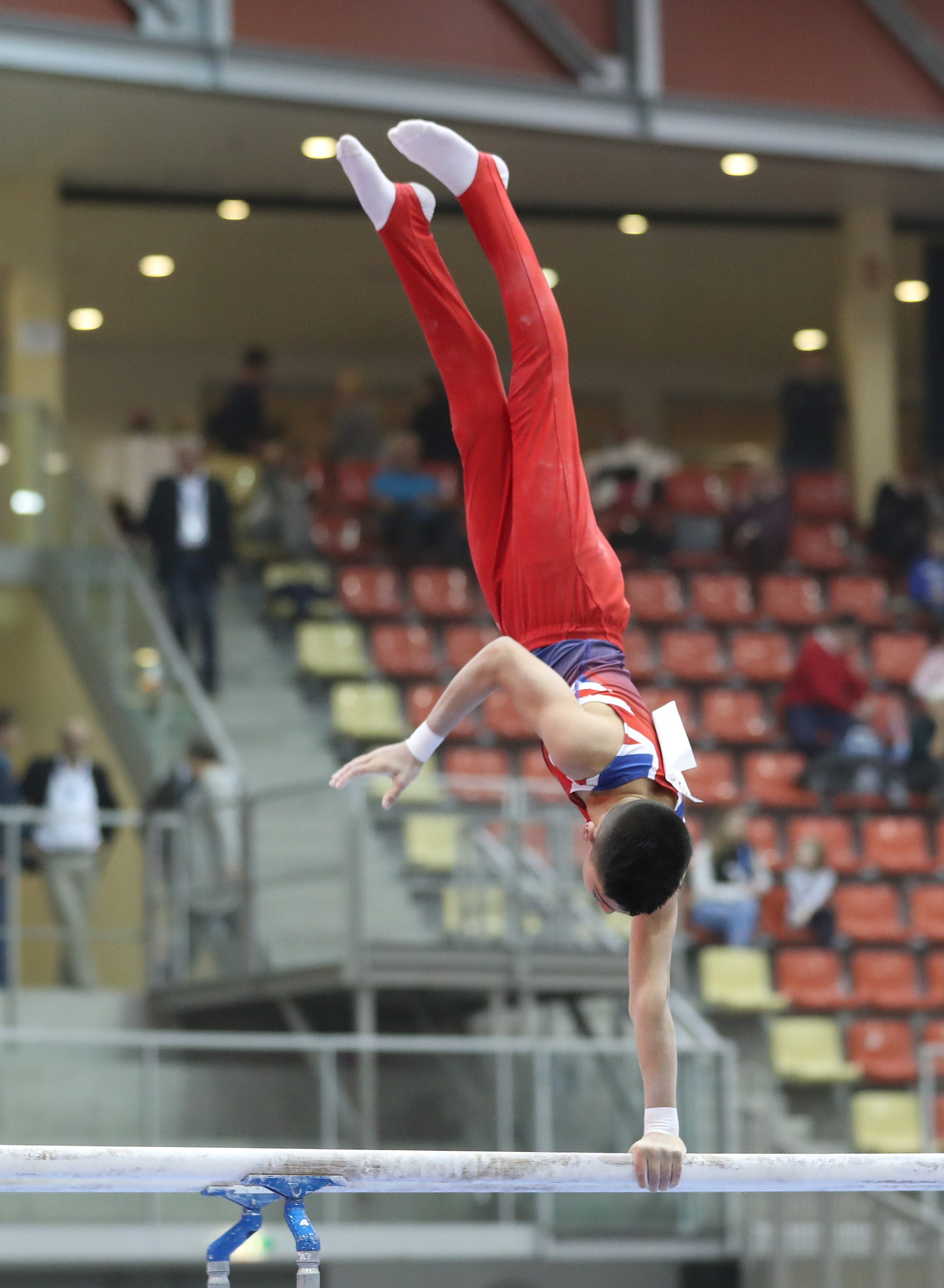

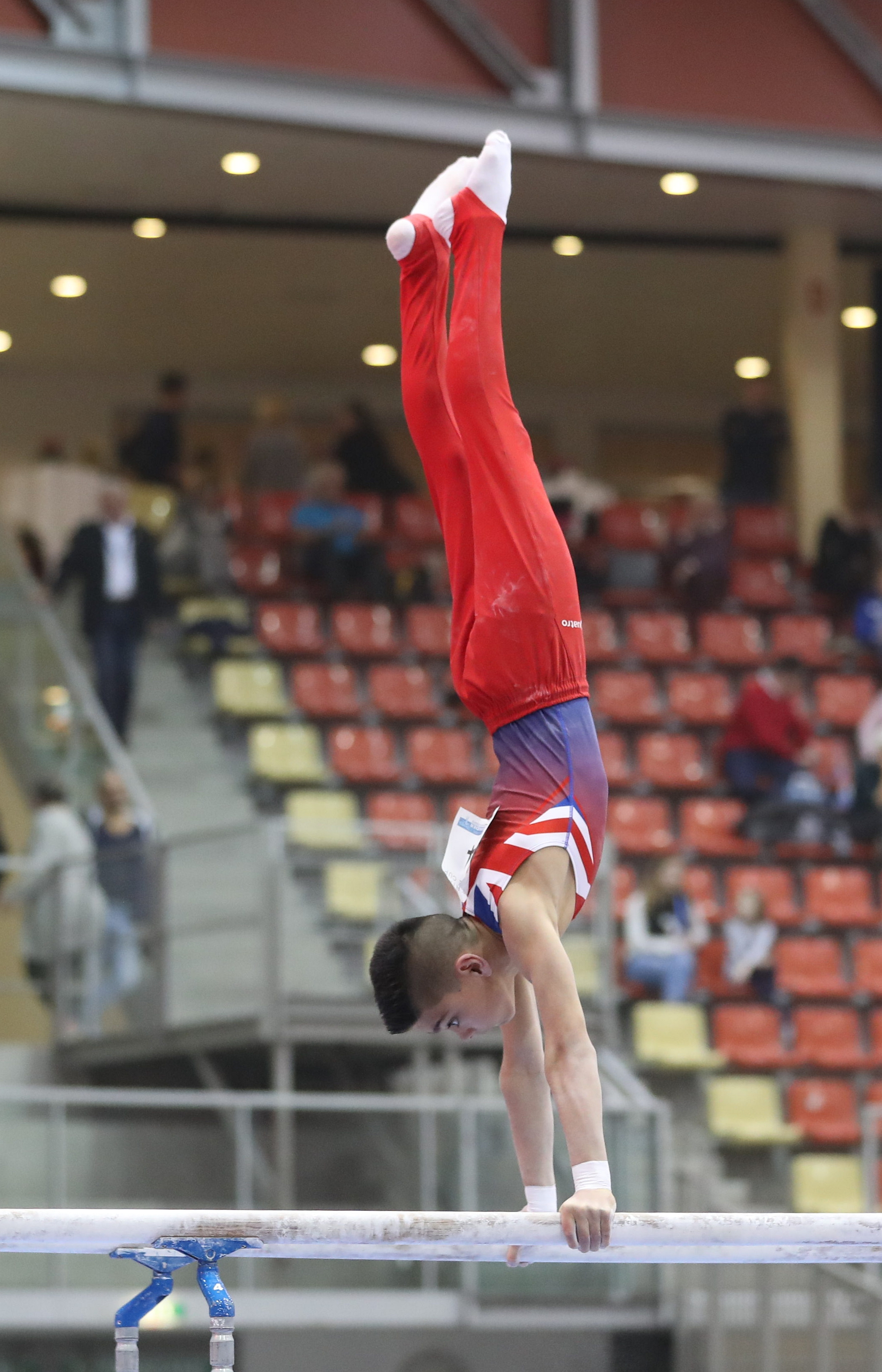
