= Miroslav Cerar (gymnast) =

Olympic gymnast

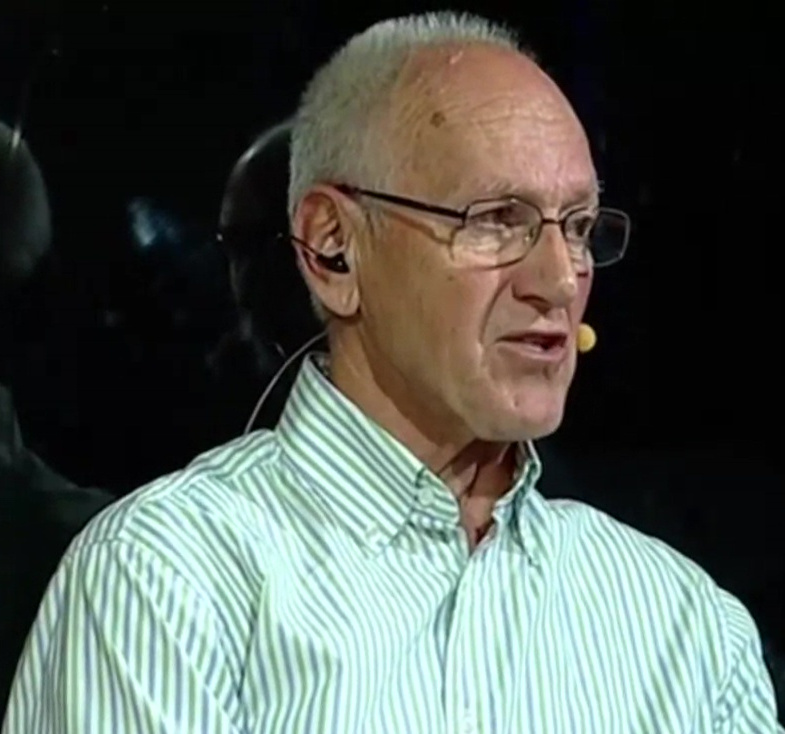
- Cerar in 2013

Personal information
- Born: 28 October 1939 (age 86) Ljubljana, Kingdom of Yugoslavia
- Height: 1.72 m (5 ft 8 in)

Gymnastics career
- Discipline: Men's artistic gymnastics
- Country represented: (Socialist Federal Republic of Yugoslavia) Yugoslavia
Medal record
Representing Yugoslavia
Olympic Games
Gold medal – first place	1964 Tokyo	Pommel horse
Gold medal – first place	1968 Mexico City	Pommel horse
Bronze medal – third place	1964 Tokyo	Horizontal bar
World Championships
Gold medal – first place	1962 Prague	Pommel horse
Gold medal – first place	1962 Prague	Parallel bars
Gold medal – first place	1966 Dortmund	Pommel horse
Gold medal – first place	1970 Ljubljana	Pommel horse
Bronze medal – third place	1958 Moscow	Pommel horse
Bronze medal – third place	1966 Dortmund	Parallel bars
European Championships
Gold medal – first place	1961 Luxembourg	All-around
Gold medal – first place	1961 Luxembourg	Pommel horse
Gold medal – first place	1961 Luxembourg	Still rings
Gold medal – first place	1961 Luxembourg	Parallel bars
Gold medal – first place	1963 Belgrade	All-around
Gold medal – first place	1963 Belgrade	Pommel horse
Gold medal – first place	1963 Belgrade	Still rings
Gold medal – first place	1963 Belgrade	Parallel bars
Gold medal – first place	1965 Anvers	Parallel bars
Gold medal – first place	1969 Warsaw	Pommel horse
Silver medal – second place	1963 Belgrade	Vault
Silver medal – second place	1965 Anvers	Floor exercise
Silver medal – second place	1965 Anvers	Pommel horse
Silver medal – second place	1967 Tampere	Pommel horse
Silver medal – second place	1969 Warsaw	Parallel bars
Bronze medal – third place	1961 Luxembourg	Vault
Bronze medal – third place	1963 Belgrade	Floor exercise
Bronze medal – third place	1965 Anvers	Still rings
Bronze medal – third place	1967 Tampere	Horizontal bar
Bronze medal – third place	1969 Warsaw	Horizontal bar

Miroslav Cerar (Slovene pronunciation: [ˈmíːrɔslaw ˈtsɛ̀ːrar]; born 28 October 1939) is a Yugoslav former artistic gymnast and lawyer of Slovene ethnicity who won the pommel horse event at the 1964 and 1968 Summer Olympics. He is also a four-time World champion and a ten-time European champion. Domestically, Cerar won 13 national all-around titles and was chosen eight times as Yugoslavia's Athlete of the Year. He was awarded the Silver Olympic Order by the International Olympic Committee. He is a co-founder of the Olympic Committee of Slovenia and a member of the executive committee of the European Fair Play Movement.

== Early life ==
Cerar was born on 28 October 1939 in Ljubljana, to parents Pavla and Ivan. His father was a naval officer during World War II who spent four years at the Dachau concentration camp. During this time, Cerar lived with his mother's parents in Turjak. He began gymnastics when he was nine years old because a teacher suggested it to improve his strength.

== Gymnastics career ==
Cerar became the junior national all-around champion of Yugoslavia in 1956. He then won his first senior national all-around title in 1957 and would go on to win the title 12 more times. His first major international competition was the 1958 World Championships, and he won the bronze medal on the pommel horse behind Soviets Boris Shakhlin and Pavel Stolbov.

Cerar represented Yugoslavia at the 1960 Summer Olympics and finished fifth on the horizontal bar and eighth in the all-around. At the 1961 European Championships, he won his first European all-around title. Additionally, he won gold medals on the pommel horse, still rings, and parallel bars, and he won the vault bronze medal. He won his first World pommel horse title at the 1962 World Championships, where he also won the parallel bars title.

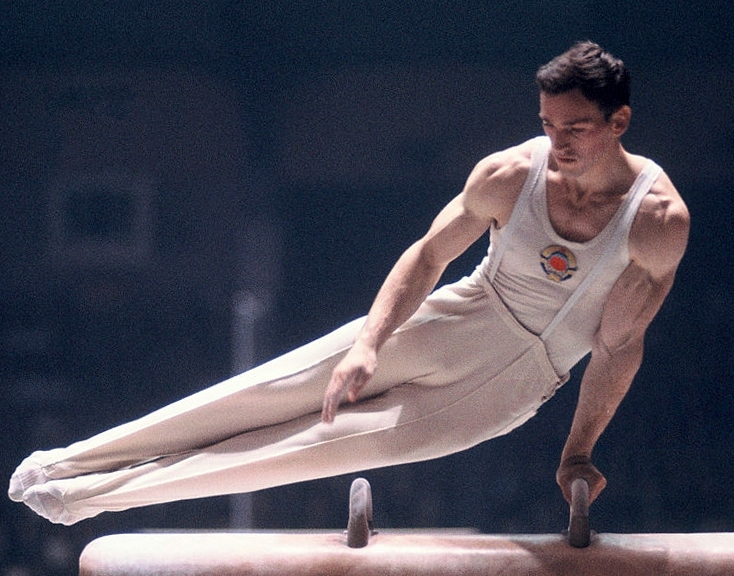
Cerar competing at the 1964 Summer Olympics

Cerar successfully defended his all-around title at the 1963 European Championships. There, he also won the pommel horse, still rings, and parallel bars titles. He also won a silver medal on the vault and a bronze medal on the floor exercise. Then at the 1963 Mediterranean Games, he won the all-around and pommel horse titles. Additionally, he won silver medals in the team event and on the floor exercise, parallel bars, and horizontal bar.

Cerar represented Yugoslavia at the 1964 Summer Olympics and was the flagbearer for the opening ceremonies. He won the gold medal on the pommel horse after posting the best scores in both the qualifying and final rounds. He also won the bronze medal on the horizontal bar behind Soviets Boris Shakhlin and Yuri Titov.

At the 1965 European Championships, Cerar won the gold medal on the parallel bars, the silver medals on both the floor exercise and pommel horse, and the bronze medal on the still rings. He finished fourth in the all-around competition, missing the bronze medal by 0.050 points. He then won the all-around silver medal at the 1965 Summer Universiade, behind Japan's Akinori Nakayama.

Cerar won the pommel horse title at the 1966 World Championships and also won the parallel bars bronze medal. Then at the 1967 European Championships, he won the silver medal on the pommel horse and the bronze medal on the horizontal bar. He represented Yugoslavia at the 1968 Summer Olympics and successfully defended his pommel horse title.

Cerar won the pommel horse title at the 1969 European Championships, where he also won the parallel bars silver medal and the horizontal bar bronze medal. His final medal was a pommel horse gold at the 1970 World Championships held in his hometown of Ljubljana. He ended his gymnastics career after these World Championships.

== Post-gymnastics career ==
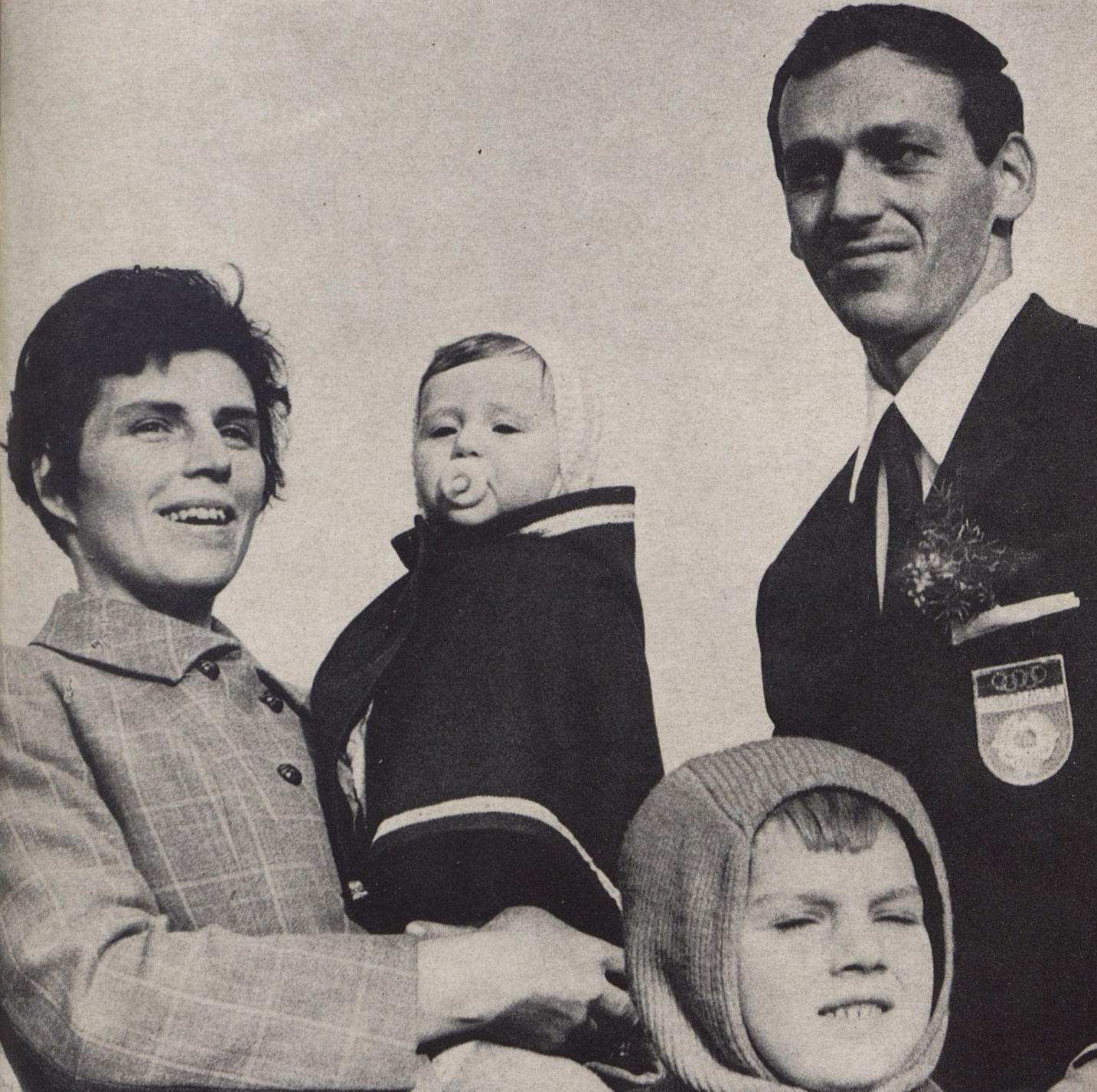
Cerar (right) with his family in 1968

Cerar was an attorney from 1973 until retiring in 2005. He owned his own law firm in Ljubljana. In 1991, Cerar helped co-found the Olympic Committee of Slovenia alongside fellow gymnast Leon Štukelj. He became a member of the executive committee of the European Fair Play Movement in 1994.

== Awards and honors ==
Cerar was voted Yugoslav Sportsman of the Year by Sportske novosti journalists eight times (1961–64, 1966, 1968–70). He was also named the Slovenian Sportsman of the Year in both 1968 and 1970. In 1984, the International Olympic Committee awarded him the Silver Olympic Order. In 1999, Cerar was inducted into the International Gymnastics Hall of Fame, and in 2011 into the Slovenian Athletes Hall of Fame.

== Personal life ==
Cerar was married to Zdenka Cerar (née Prusnik), who was the first female State Prosecutor General of the Republic of Slovenia (1999–2004), Minister of Justice (2004) and vice-president of the Liberal Democracy of Slovenia (LDS) political party. In her youth, she was a two-time junior national all-around gymnastics champion in Yugoslavia and a member of the Yugoslav national team. After she ended her gymnastics career, she became a coach and referee. Their son, Miro Cerar, is also a lawyer and a politician. He was Slovenia's prime minister from 2014 until 2018 and head of the Modern Centre Party (SMC) party. They also have two daughters, Alenka and Vesna, and six grandchildren.

Awards
Preceded by Radivoj Korać; Milan Galić	(Socialist Federal Republic of Yugoslavia) The Best Athlete of Yugoslavia; 1961; 1963, 1964	Succeeded by Milan Galić; Branislav Lončar
Preceded by Radivoj Korać; Branislav Lončar; Ivo Daneu	Yugoslav Sportsman of the Year; 1961–64; 1966; 1968–70	Succeeded by Branislav Lončar; Ivo Daneu; Mate Parlov
Olympic Games
Preceded by Radovan Radović	Flagbearer for Yugoslavia; Tokyo 1964	Succeeded by Branislav Simić
