= Mikhail Voronin =

Russian gymnast

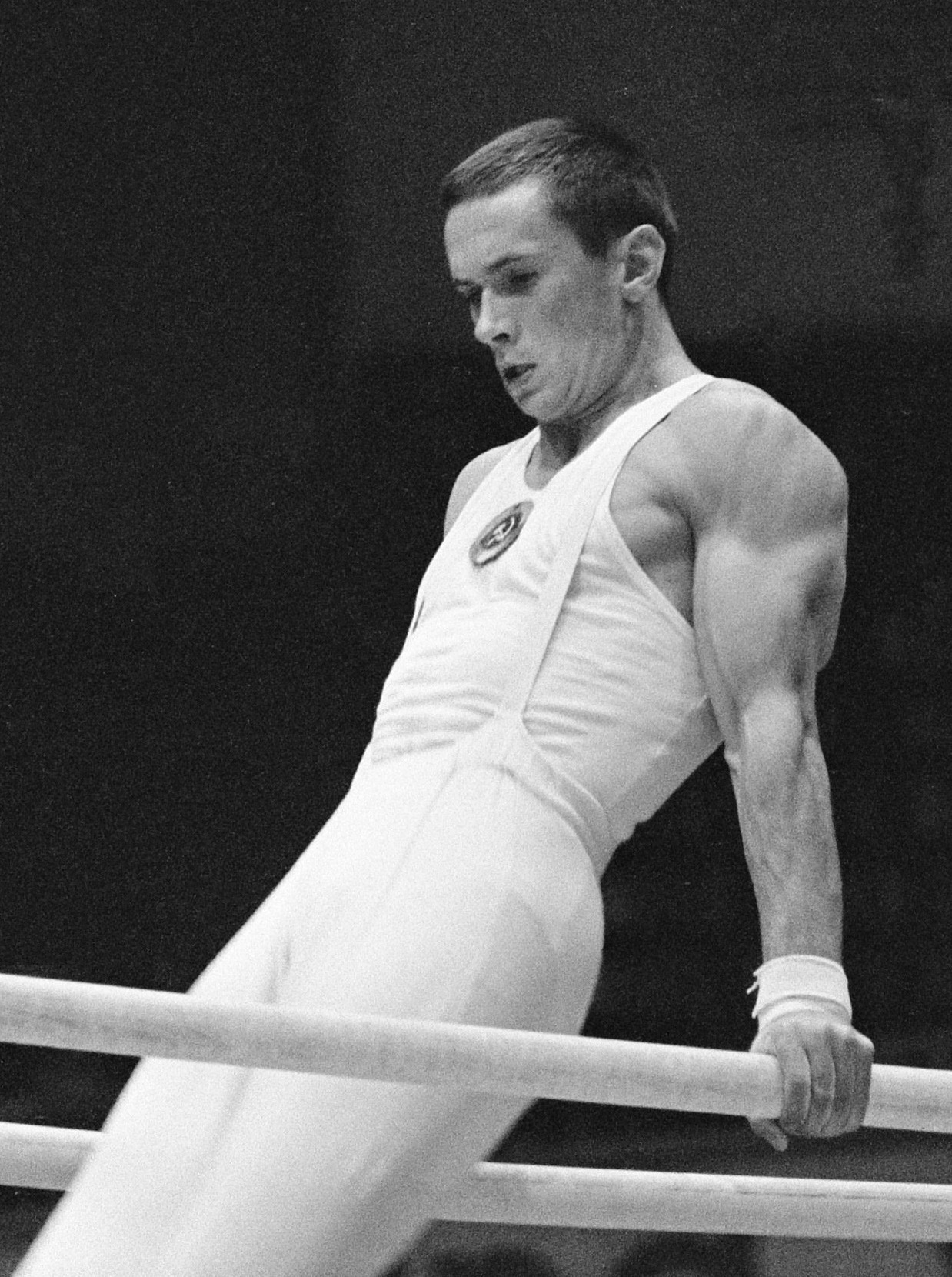
- Mikhail Voronin in 1966

Personal information
- Full name: Mikhail Yakovlevich Voronin
- Born: 26 March 1945 Moscow, RSFSR, Soviet Union
- Died: 22 May 2004 (aged 59) Moscow, Russia
- Height: 1.70 m (5 ft 7 in)

Gymnastics career
- Discipline: Men's artistic gymnastics
- Country represented: Soviet Union
- Club: Dynamo Moscow
Medal record
Olympic Games
Gold medal – first place	1968 Mexico City	Vault
Gold medal – first place	1968 Mexico City	Horizontal bar
Silver medal – second place	1968 Mexico City	Team
Silver medal – second place	1968 Mexico City	All-around
Silver medal – second place	1968 Mexico City	Rings
Silver medal – second place	1968 Mexico City	Parallel bars
Silver medal – second place	1972 Munich	Team
Silver medal – second place	1972 Munich	Rings
Bronze medal – third place	1968 Mexico City	Pommel horse
World Championships
Gold medal – first place	1966 Dortmund	All-around
Gold medal – first place	1966 Dortmund	Rings
Silver medal – second place	1966 Dortmund	Team
Silver medal – second place	1966 Dortmund	Pommel horse
Silver medal – second place	1966 Dortmund	Parallel bars
Silver medal – second place	1970 Ljubljana	Team
Bronze medal – third place	1970 Ljubljana	Rings
Bronze medal – third place	1970 Ljubljana	Parallel bars

Mikhail Yakovlevich Voronin (Russian: Михаил Яковлевич Воронин; 26 March 1945 – 22 May 2004) was a Soviet and Russian gymnast who competed for the Soviet Union in the late 1960s and early 1970s. He won seven medals, including two gold, at the 1968 Summer Olympics, as well as two silver medals at the 1972 Summer Olympics.

== Career ==
Voronin trained at Dynamo in Moscow and became an Honoured Master of Sports of the USSR in 1966. He won national titles in the all-around (1968–71) and on the rings (1966–67, 1969–72), pommel horse (1967, 1969–70), parallel bars (1967, 1969), high bar (1971) and floor exercise (1966).

He won the all-around and rings titles at the 1966 World Artistic Gymnastics Championships. He also won 15 medals at the European Championships, including gold medals in the all-around (1967, 1969) and on rings (1967, 1969, 1971), parallel bars (1967, 1969) and pommel horse (1967).

After the 1972 Olympics, he retired from competition and became a gymnastics coach. He was the head coach at Dynamo from 1973 to 1994, and president of the club from 1994 until his death in 2004. From 1978 to 1988, he was also president of the Russian Gymnastics Federation.

== Honors ==
Voronin was awarded the Order of the Red Banner of Labour in 1969, and became an Honoured Trainer of the Russian SFSR in 1979 and Honoured Trainer of the USSR in 1980. In 1973, he graduated from the State Central Order of Lenin Institute of Physical Culture.

== Voronin element ==
An element or horizontal bar was named after Mikhail Voronin. It's a back uprise and piked vault with 1/2 (180°) turn to hang.

Execution of the Voronin

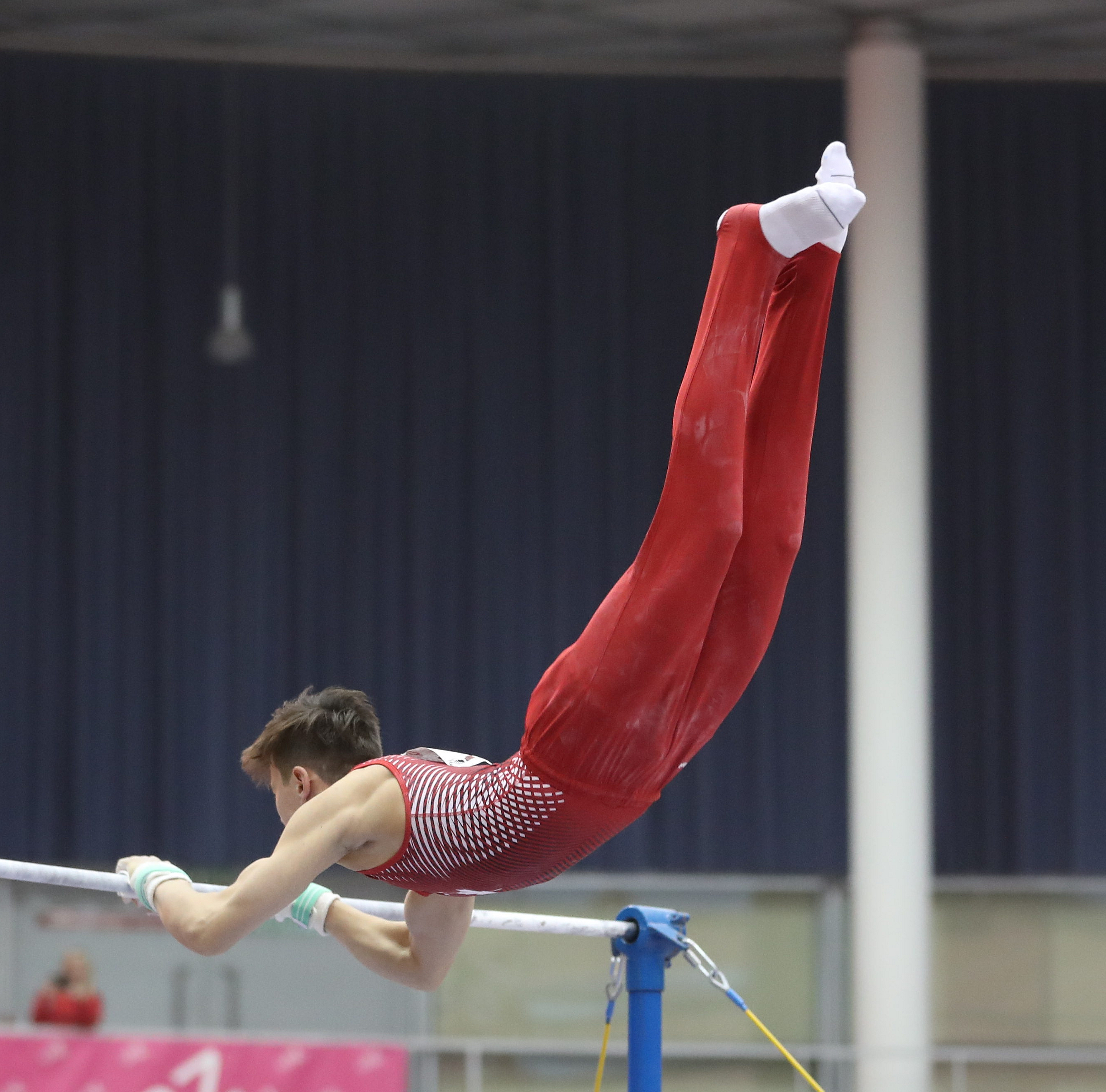
Performed by Evgeny Siminiuc at the Austrian Future Cup 2018

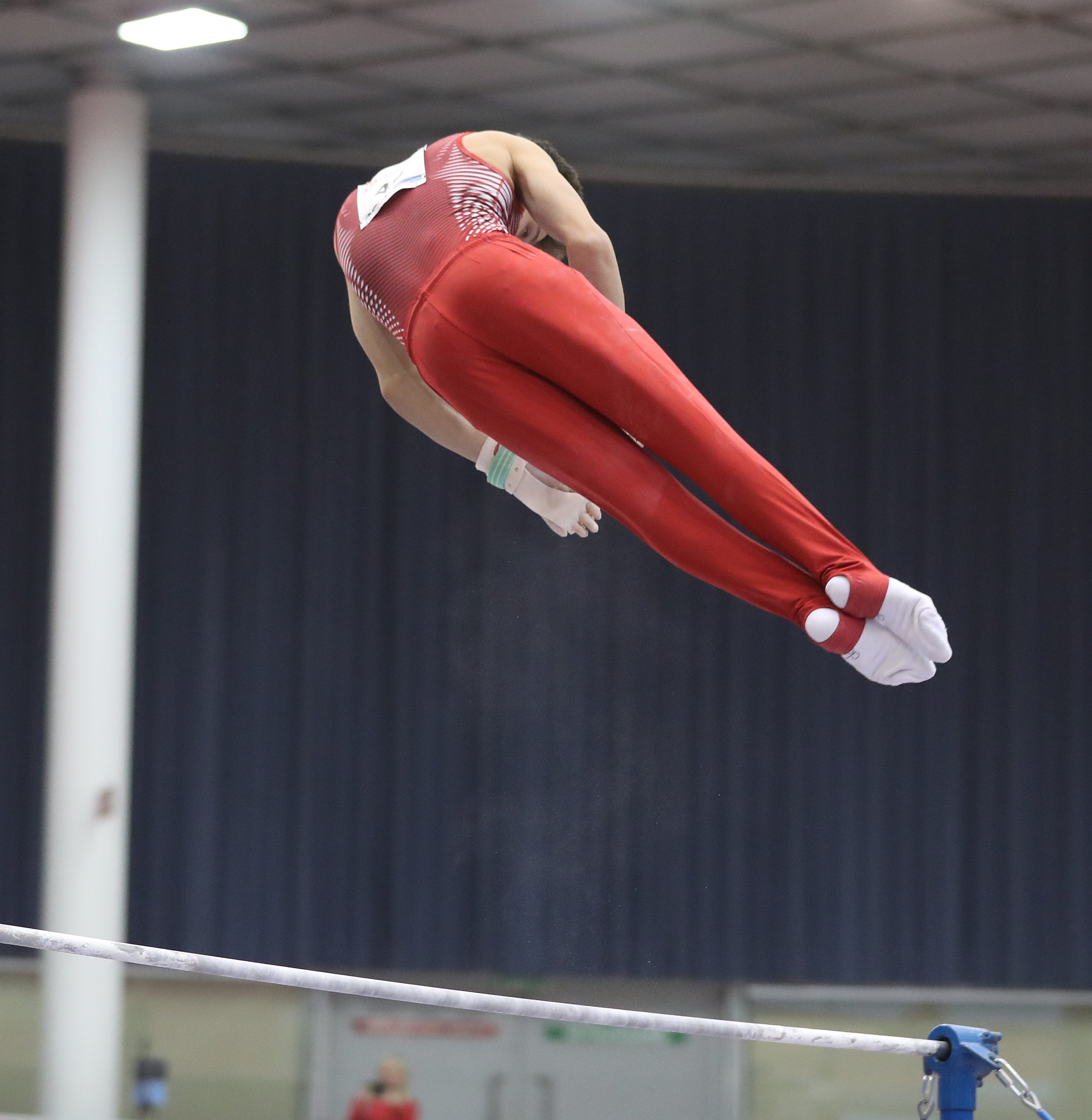

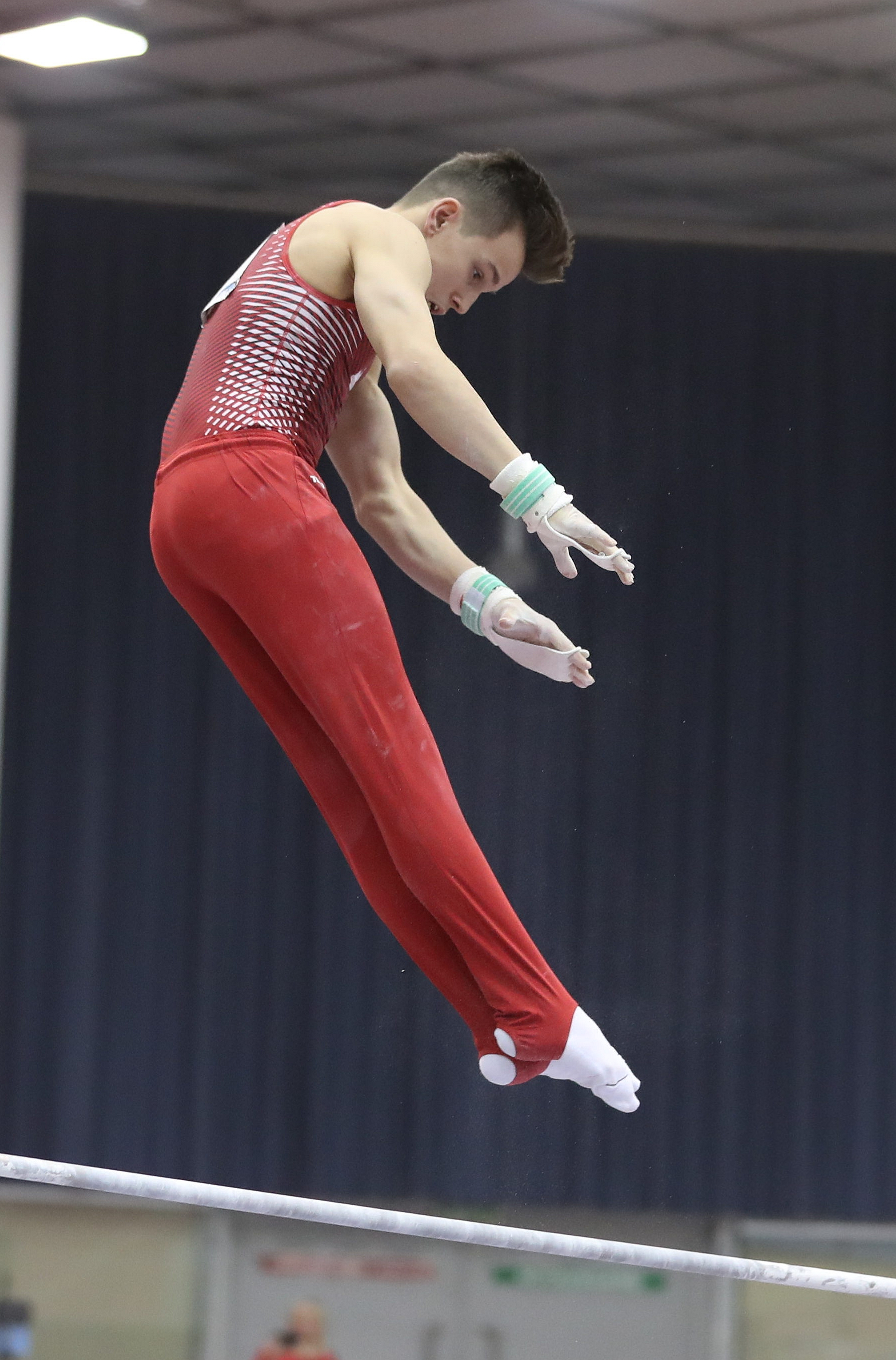

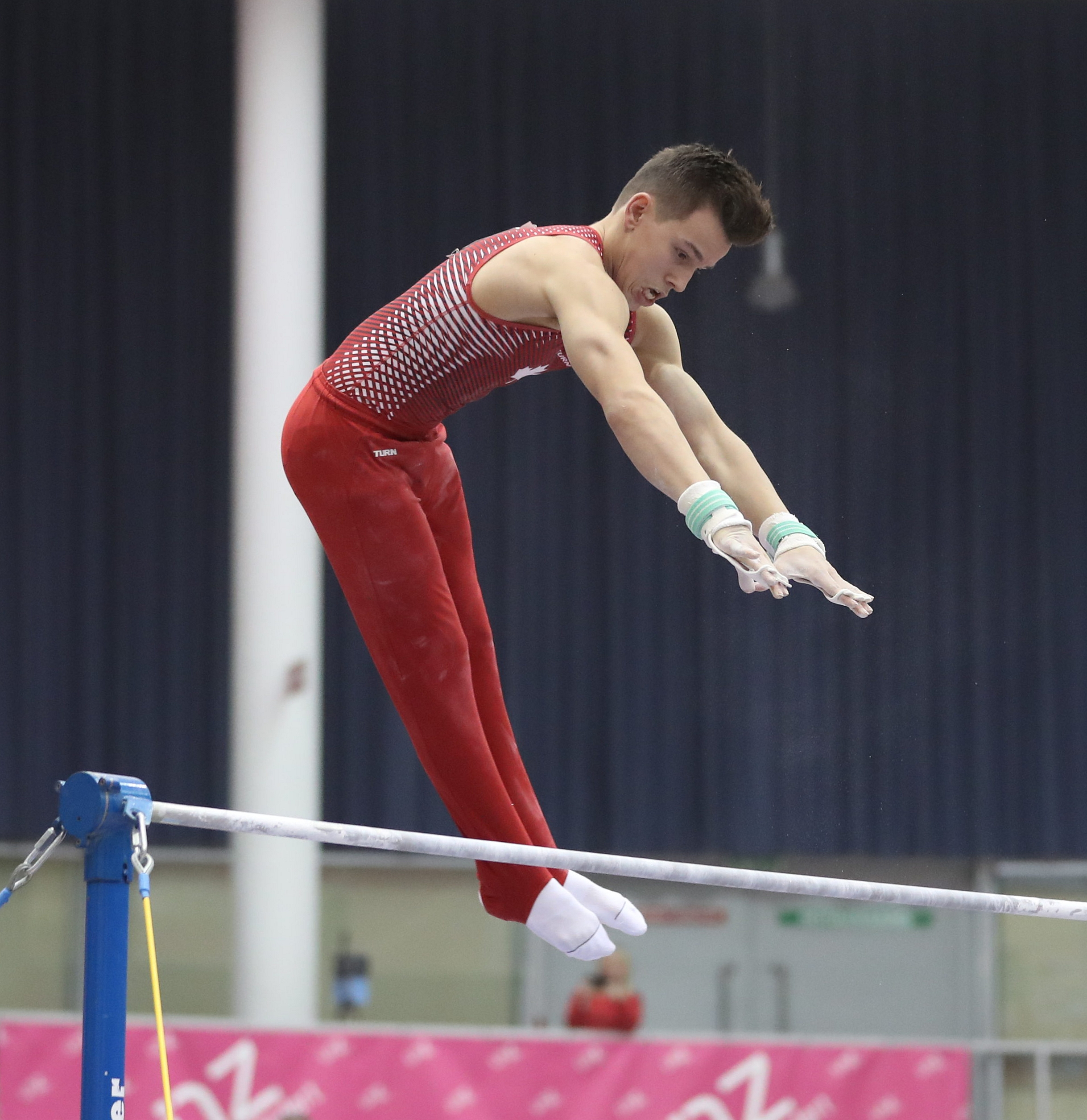

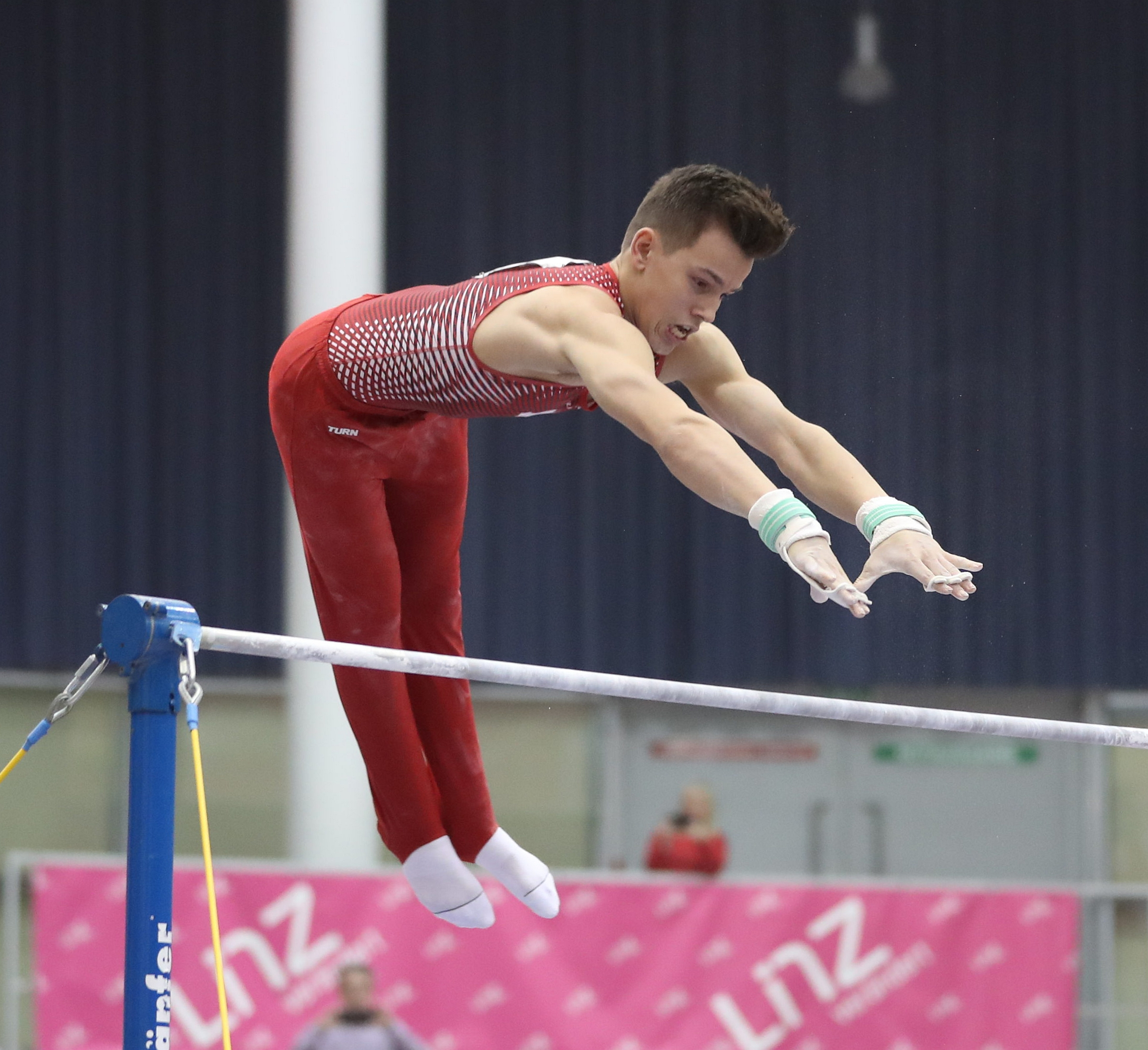

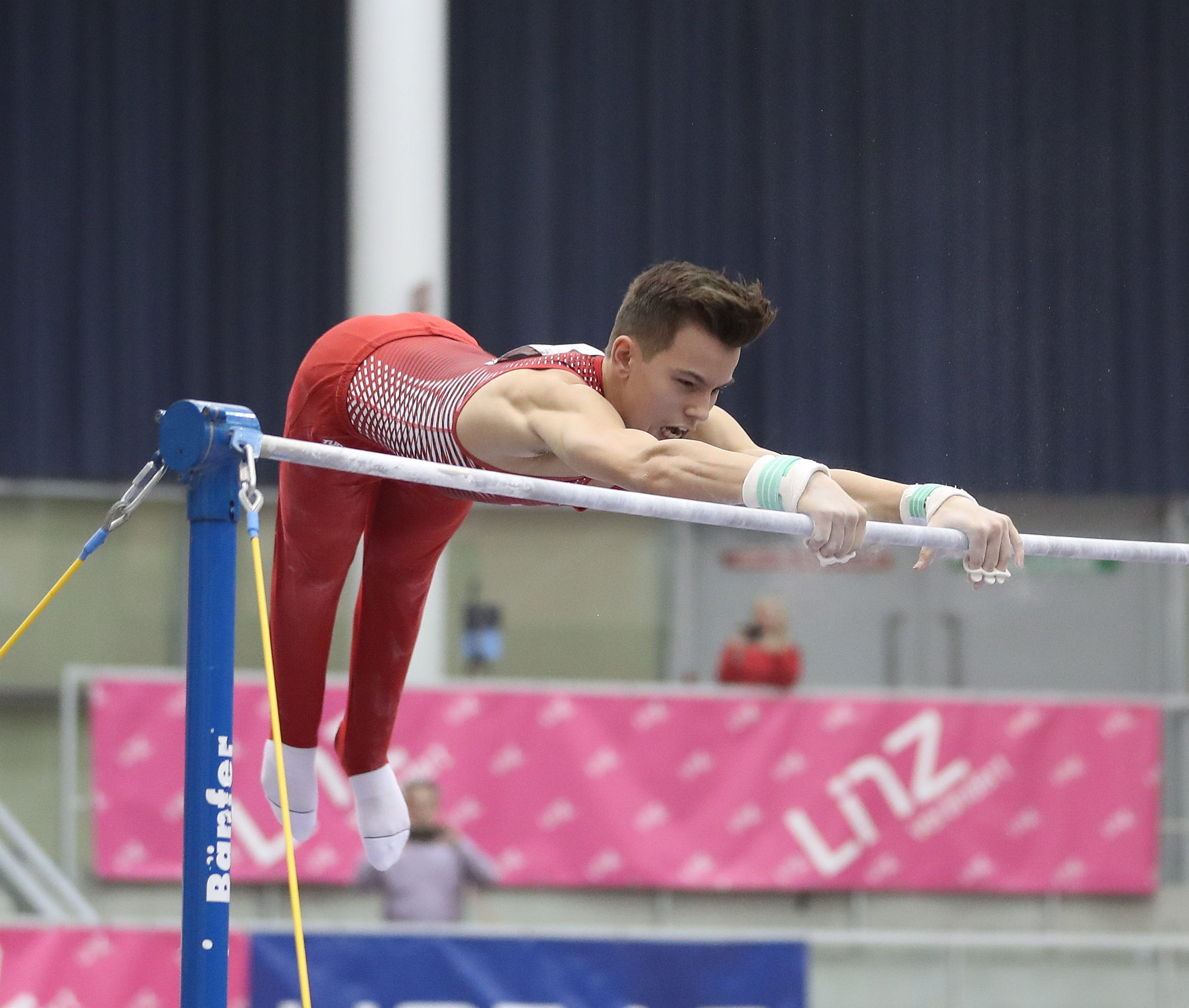

== Personal life ==
Voronin's first wife, Zinaida Voronina, and son Dmitry Voronin were also competitive gymnasts. He and Voronina divorced in 1980.

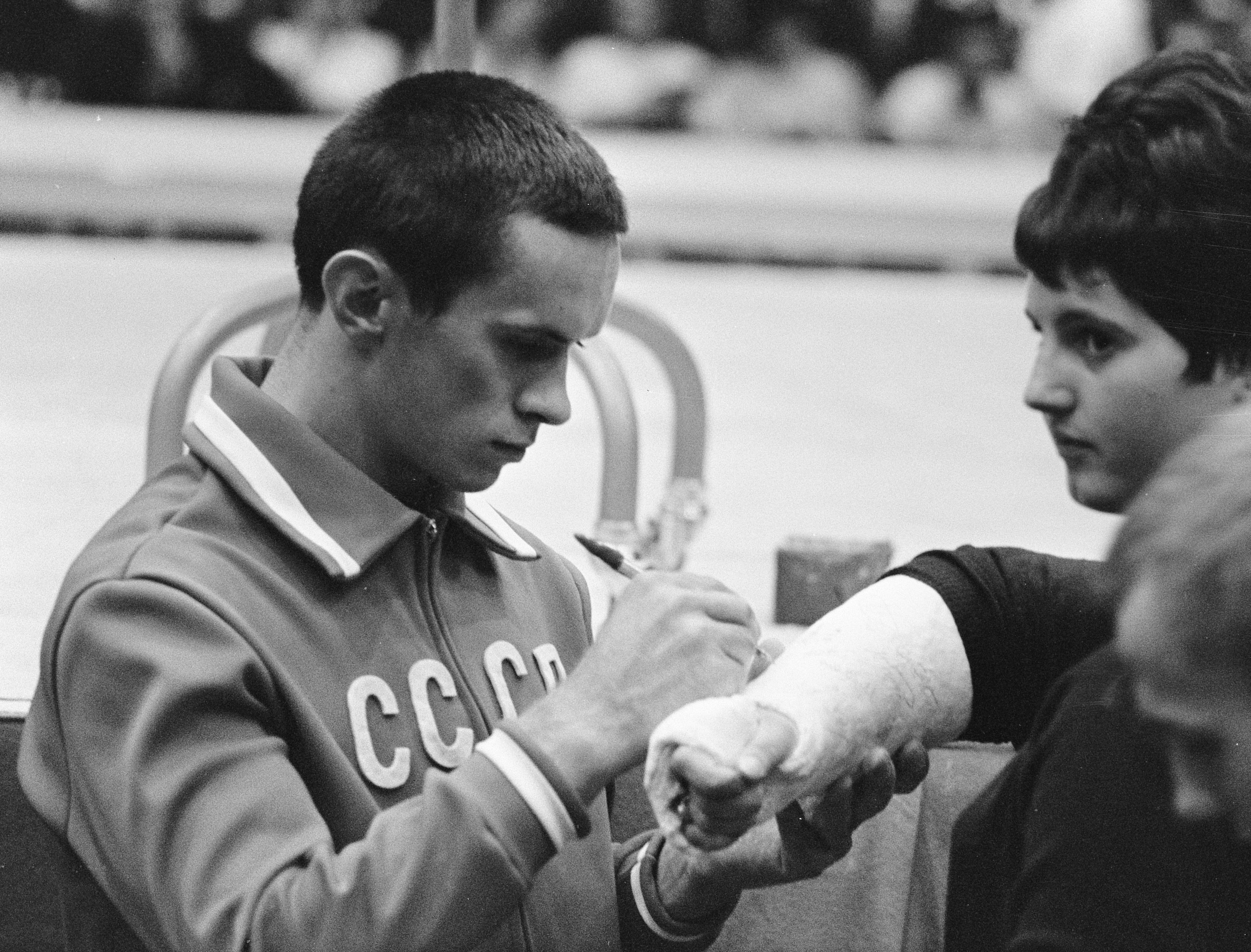
Voronin signing a bandage at the 1966 World Championships

== See also ==
- List of multiple Olympic medalists at a single Games
