= Olympic order in artistic gymnastics =

Sequence in which a gymnast performs

Olympic order in artistic gymnastics refers to the sequence in which a gymnast performs from one exercise to another in a competition and in which sequence a competition is held. Male gymnasts perform on six apparatuses in Olympic order. Female gymnasts perform on four apparatuses.

For male gymnasts, the Olympic order is as follows:

1) Floor
2) Pommel horse
3) Rings
4) Vault
5) Parallel bars
6) Horizontal bar

For female gymnasts, the Olympic order is as follows:

1) Vault
2) Uneven bars
3) Balance beam
4) Floor

Olympic order is performed in a circular format, i.e. in an all-around competition where there are 24 competitors, there might be four competitors on each apparatus in the first rotation for the men, and six for the women. In the second rotation, each group of six/four gymnasts progresses to the next apparatus. Male gymnast A might start on vault in the first rotation, then progress to parallel bars in the second rotation, to horizontal bar in the third rotation, then circle around to floor on the fourth rotation and end on rings in the last rotation. Male gymnast Q might start on floor in the first rotation and then logically progress to horizontal bar in the last (sixth) rotation in an all-around competition.
