= Artistic gymnastics =

Discipline of gymnastics involving forms of performance art

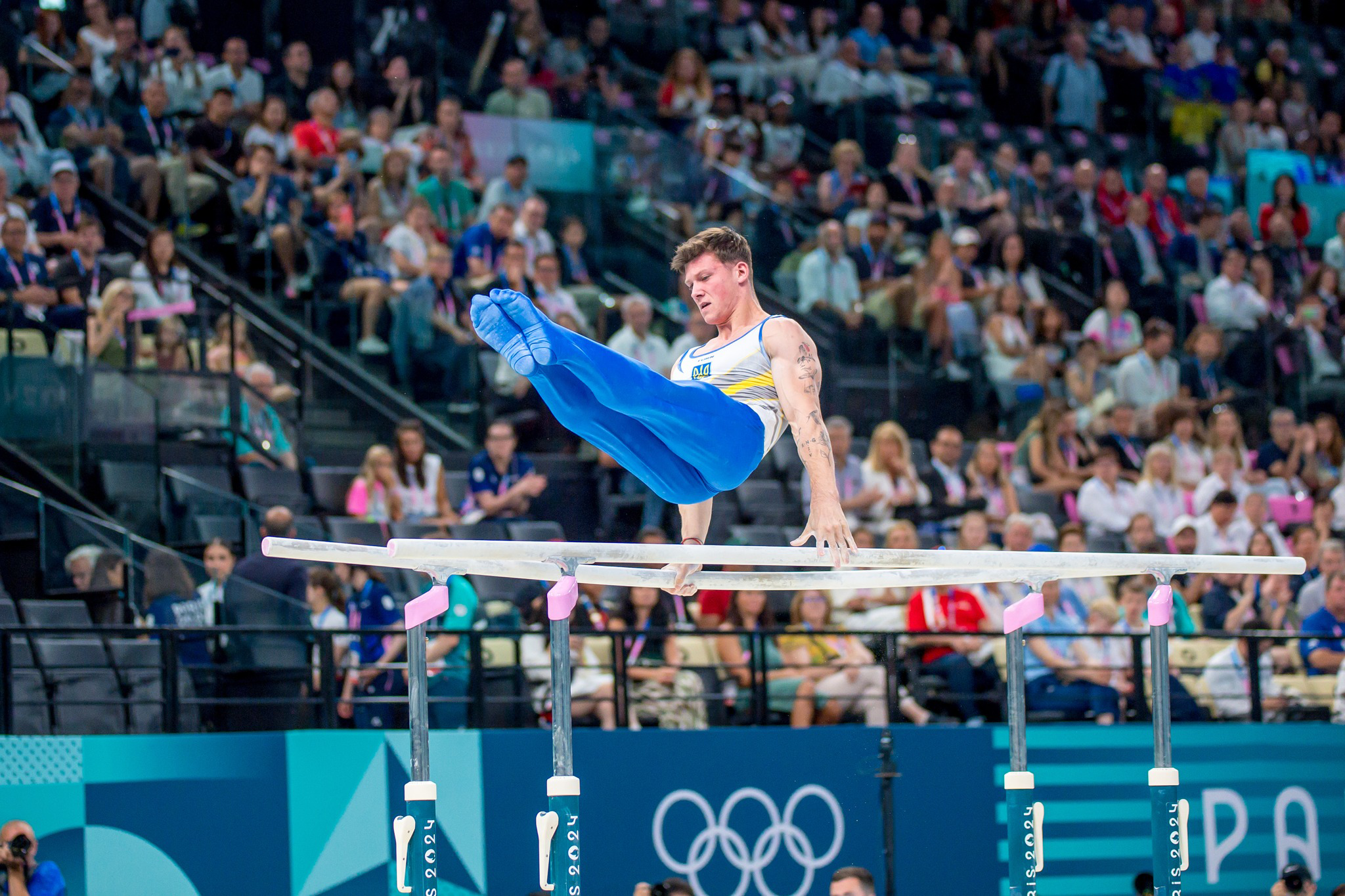
- Illia Kovtun at the 2024 Summer Olympics
- Highest governing body: World Gymnastics
- Registered players: 1881

Characteristics
- Mixed-sex: Yes
- Type: Indoor

Presence
- Olympic: Since the first Summer Olympics in 1896

Artistic gymnastics is a discipline of gymnastics in which athletes perform short routines on different types of apparatus. The sport is governed by World Gymnastics, which assigns the Code of Points used to score performances and regulates all aspects of elite international competition. Within individual countries, gymnastics is regulated by national federations such as British Gymnastics and USA Gymnastics. Artistic gymnastics is a popular spectator sport at many competitions, including the Summer Olympic Games.

== History ==
The gymnastic system was mentioned in writings by ancient authors, including Homer, Aristotle, and Plato. It included many disciplines that later became independent sports, such as swimming, racing, wrestling, boxing, and horse riding. It was also used for military training.

Gymnastics evolved in Bohemia and what later became Germany at the beginning of the 19th century. The term "artistic gymnastics" was introduced to distinguish freestyle performances from those used by the military. The German educator Friedrich Ludwig Jahn, who was known as the father of gymnastics, invented several apparatus, including the horizontal bar and parallel bars. Two of the first gymnastics clubs were Turnvereins and Sokols.

The Fédération Internationale de Gymnastique (FIG), the French name for the International Gymnastics Federation, was founded in 1881 and remains the governing body of international gymnastics. The organization began with three countries and was called the European Gymnastics Federation until 1921, when the first non-European countries joined, and it was reorganized into its modern form.

Gymnastics was included in the 1896 Summer Olympics, but female gymnasts were not allowed to participate in the Olympics until 1928. The World Artistic Gymnastics Championships, held since 1903, were only open to men until 1934. Since then, two branches of artistic gymnastics have developed: women's artistic gymnastics (WAG) and men's artistic gymnastics (MAG). Unlike men's and women's branches of many other sports, WAG and MAG differ significantly in technique and apparatuses used at major competitions.

=== Women's artistic gymnastics ===
As a team event, women's gymnastics entered the Olympics in 1928 and the World Championships in 1950. Individual women were recognized in the all-around as early as the 1934 World Championships. The existing women's program—all-around and event finals on the vault, uneven bars, balance beam, and floor exercise—was introduced at the 1950 World Championships and at the 1952 Summer Olympics.

The earliest champions in women's gymnastics tended to be in their 20s, and most had studied ballet for years before entering the sport. Larisa Latynina, the first great Soviet gymnast, won her first Olympic all-around medal at age 22 and her second at 26; she became world champion in 1958 while pregnant. Věra Čáslavská of Czechoslovakia, who followed Latynina and became a two-time Olympic all-around champion, was 22 when she won her first Olympic gold medal. The rules for the 1952 and 1956 Summer Olympics specified that gymnasts must turn 18 the year of the competition, with female gymnasts turning 16 or 17 only allowed to compete with a doctor's clearance.

In the 1970s, the average age of Olympic gymnasts began to decrease. While it was not unheard of for teenagers to compete in the 1960s – Ludmilla Tourischeva was 16 at her first Olympics in 1968 – younger female gymnasts slowly became the norm as the sport's difficulty increased. Smaller, lighter girls generally excelled in the more challenging acrobatic elements required by the redesigned Code of Points. The 58th Congress of the FIG – held in July 1980, just before the Olympics – decided to raise the minimum age for senior international competition from 14 to 15. However, the change, which came into effect two years later, did not eliminate the problem. By the time of the 1992 Summer Olympics, elite gymnasts consisted almost exclusively of "pixies" – underweight young teenagers – and concerns were raised about athletes' welfare.

In 1997, the FIG responded to this trend by raising the minimum age for international elite competition to 16. This, combined with changes in the Code of Points and evolving popular opinion in the sport, led to the return of older gymnasts. While there are still gymnasts who are successful as teenagers, it is common to see gymnasts competing and winning medals well into their 20s. At the 2004 Olympics, women captained both the second-place American team and the third-place Russians in their mid-20s; several other teams, including those from Australia, France, and Canada, included older gymnasts as well. At the 2008 Olympics, the silver medalist on vault, Oksana Chusovitina, was 33 years old. By the 2016 Olympics, the average age of female gymnasts was over 20, and it was almost 22 at the 2020 Olympics. At the 2024 Olympics the average age for the medal winning teams were USA: 22.2 years; Italy: 19.6 years; Brazil: 25.2 years.

== Apparatus ==
Both male and female gymnasts are judged for execution, degree of difficulty, and overall presentation. In many competitions, especially high-level ones sanctioned by the FIG, gymnasts compete in "Olympic order", which has changed over time but has stayed consistent for at least a few decades.

For men's artistic gymnastics, the Olympic order is:

1) Floor exercise
2) Pommel horse
3) Still rings
4) Vault
5) Parallel bars
6) Horizontal bar

For women's artistic gymnastics, the Olympic order is:

1) Vault
2) Uneven bars
3) Balance beam
4) Floor exercise

=== Men and women ===
==== Vault ====
The vault is both an event and the primary equipment used in that event. Unlike most gymnastic events employing apparatuses, the vault is standard in men's and women's competitions, with little difference. A gymnast sprints down a runway, which is a maximum of 25 m (82 ft) in length, before leaping onto a springboard. Harnessing the energy of the spring, the gymnast directs their body hands-first toward the vault. Body position is maintained while "popping" (blocking using only a shoulder movement) the vaulting platform. The gymnast then rotates their body to land standing on the far side of the vault. In advanced gymnastics, multiple twists and somersaults may be added before landing. Successful vaults depend on the speed of the run, the length of the hurdle, the power the gymnast generates from the legs and shoulder girdle, kinesthetic awareness in the air, and the speed of rotation in the case of more challenging and complex vaults.

In 2004, the traditional vaulting horse was replaced with a new apparatus, sometimes known as a tongue or table. It is more stable, wider, and longer than the older vaulting horse—about 1 m (3.3 ft) in length and width, giving gymnasts a larger blocking surface—and is, therefore, safer than the old vaulting horse. This new, safer apparatus led gymnasts to attempt more difficult vaults.

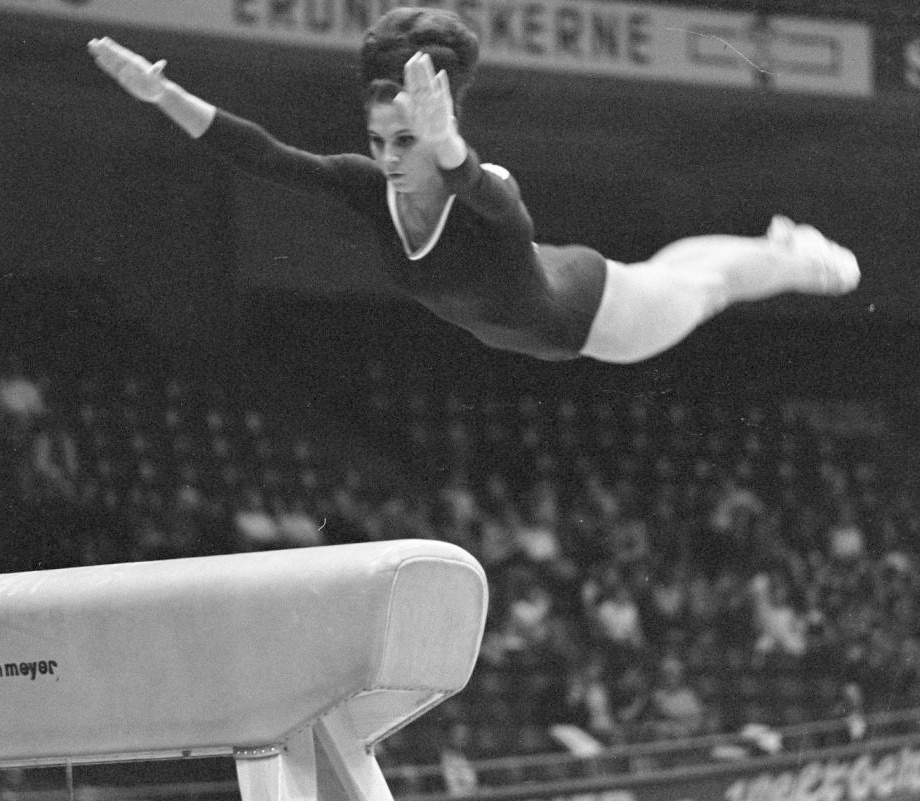
(Czechoslovakia) Jana Kubičková at the
1966 World Championships
(old vault horse)

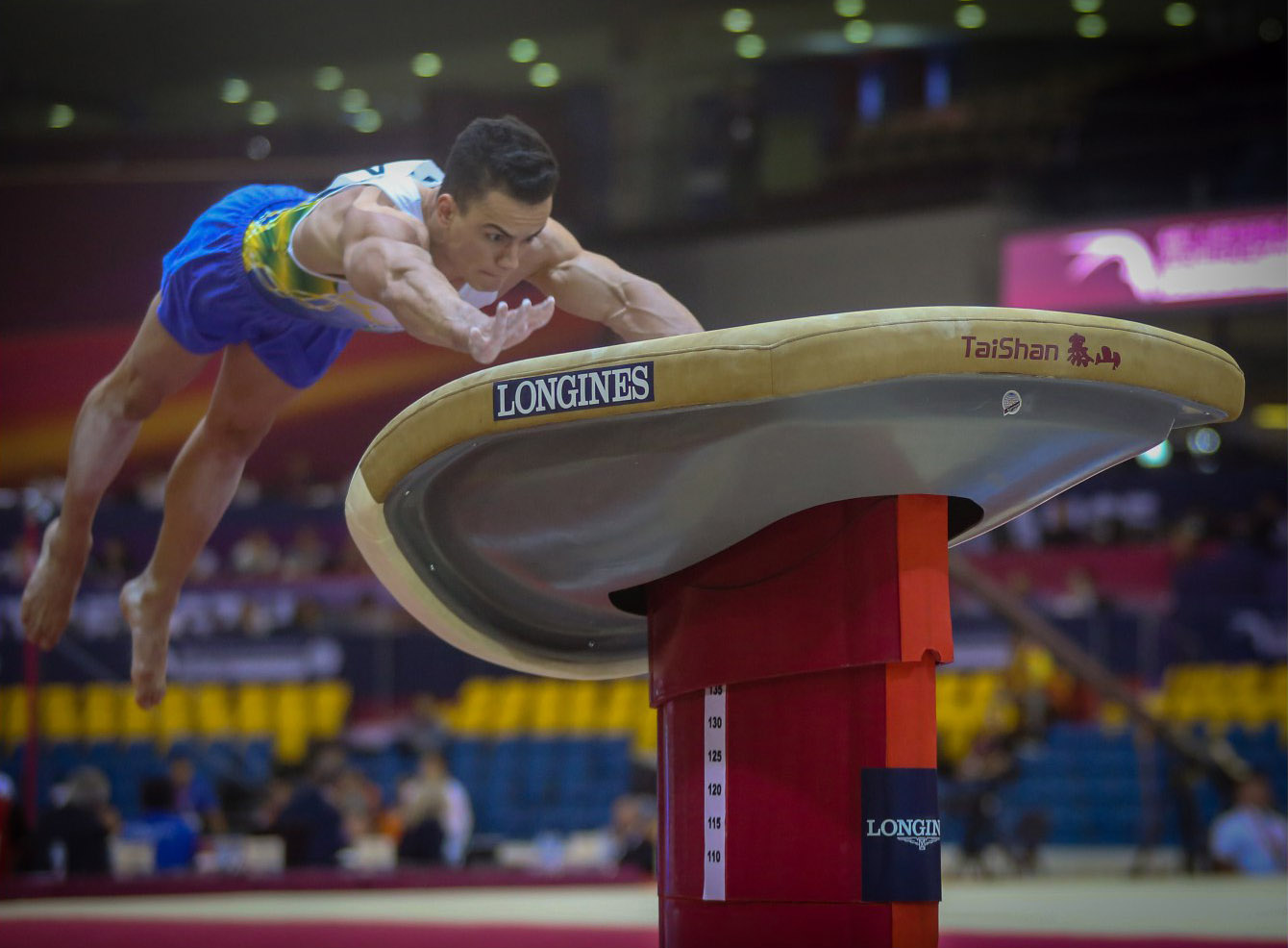
(Brazil) Caio Souza at the
2018 World Championships
(new vault table)

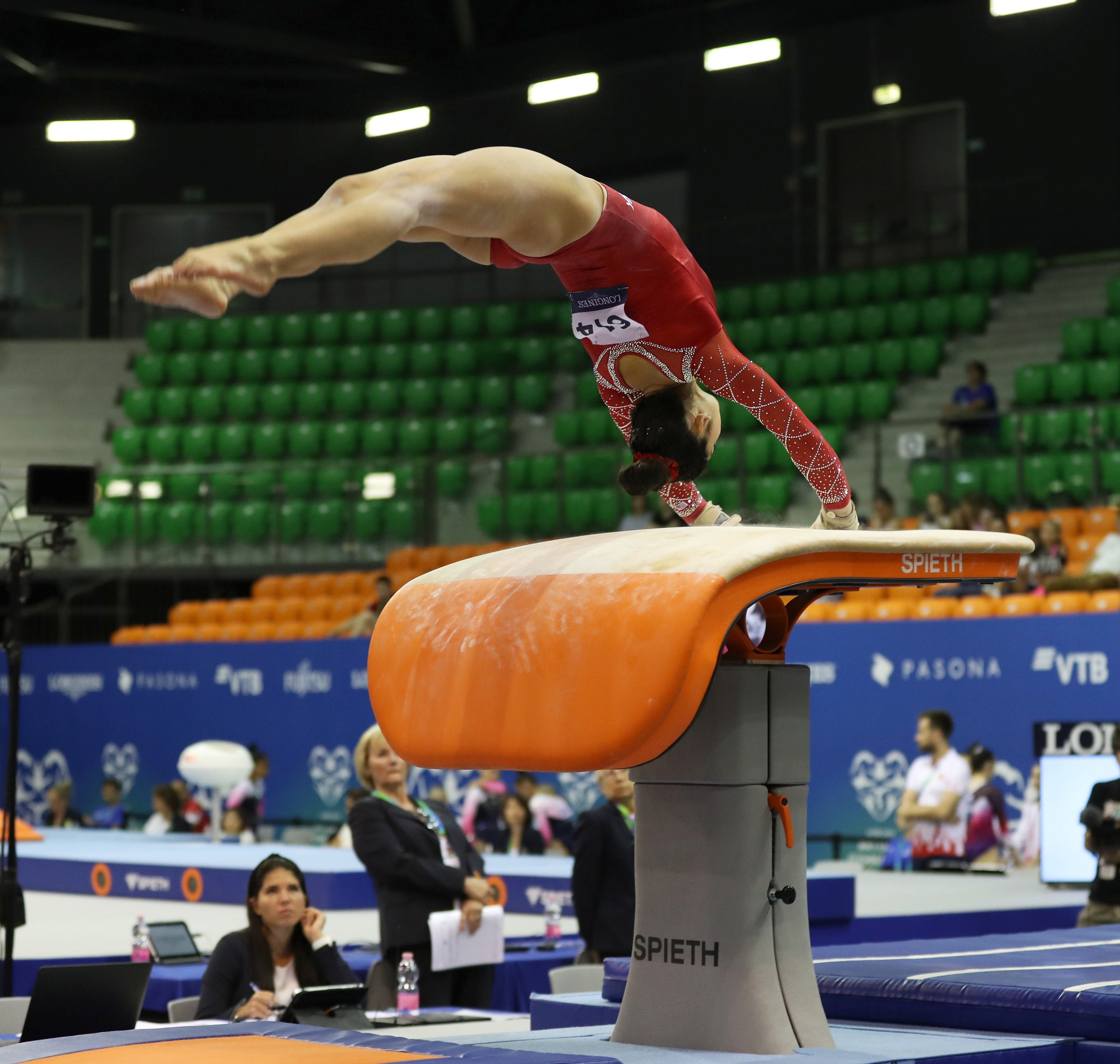
(United States) Kayla DiCello at the
2019 Junior World Championships
(new vault table)

==== Floor exercise ====
The floor event occurs on a carpeted 12 m × 12 m (39 ft × 39 ft) square consisting of rigid foam over a layer of plywood supported by springs or foam blocks. This provides a firm surface that will respond with force when compressed, allowing gymnasts to achieve extra height and a softer landing than possible on a regular floor.

Men perform without music for 60 to 70 seconds and must touch each floor corner at least once during their routine. Their routines include tumbling passes demonstrating flexibility, strength, balance, and power. They must also show non-acrobatic skills, including circles, scales, and press handstands.

Women perform a 90-second choreographed routine to instrumental music. Their routines include tumbling passes, jumps, dance elements, acrobatic skills, and turns. Elite gymnasts may perform up to four tumbling passes.

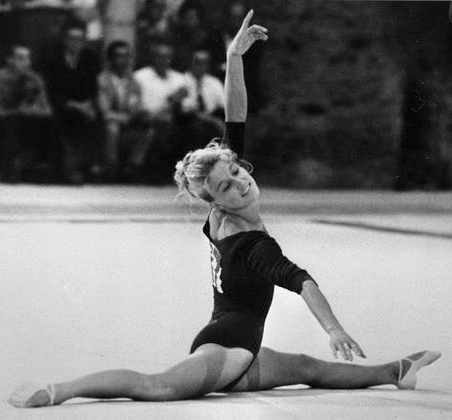
(Soviet Union) Polina Astakhova at the 1960 Summer Olympics

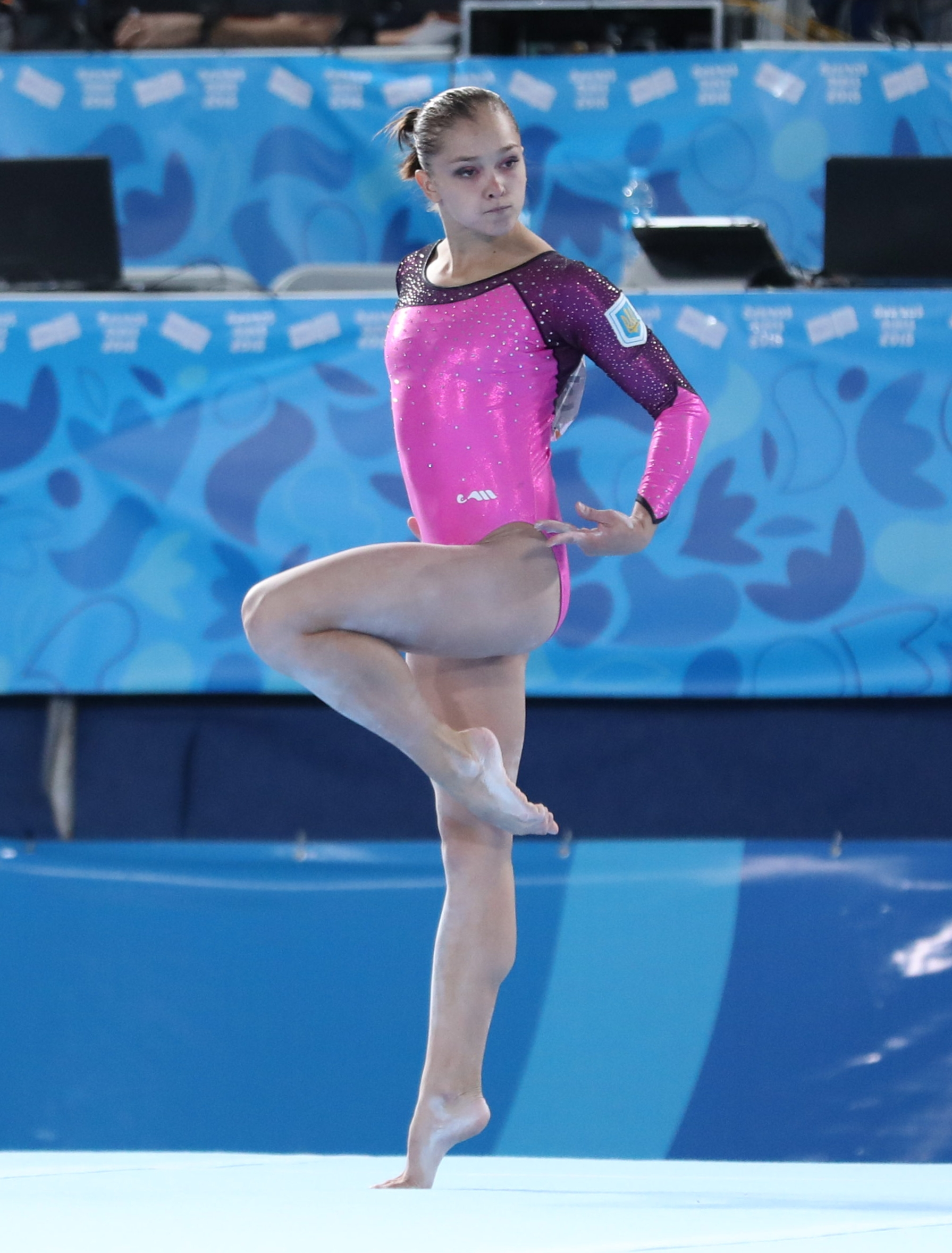
(Ukraine) Anastasia Bachynska at the
2018 Youth Olympics

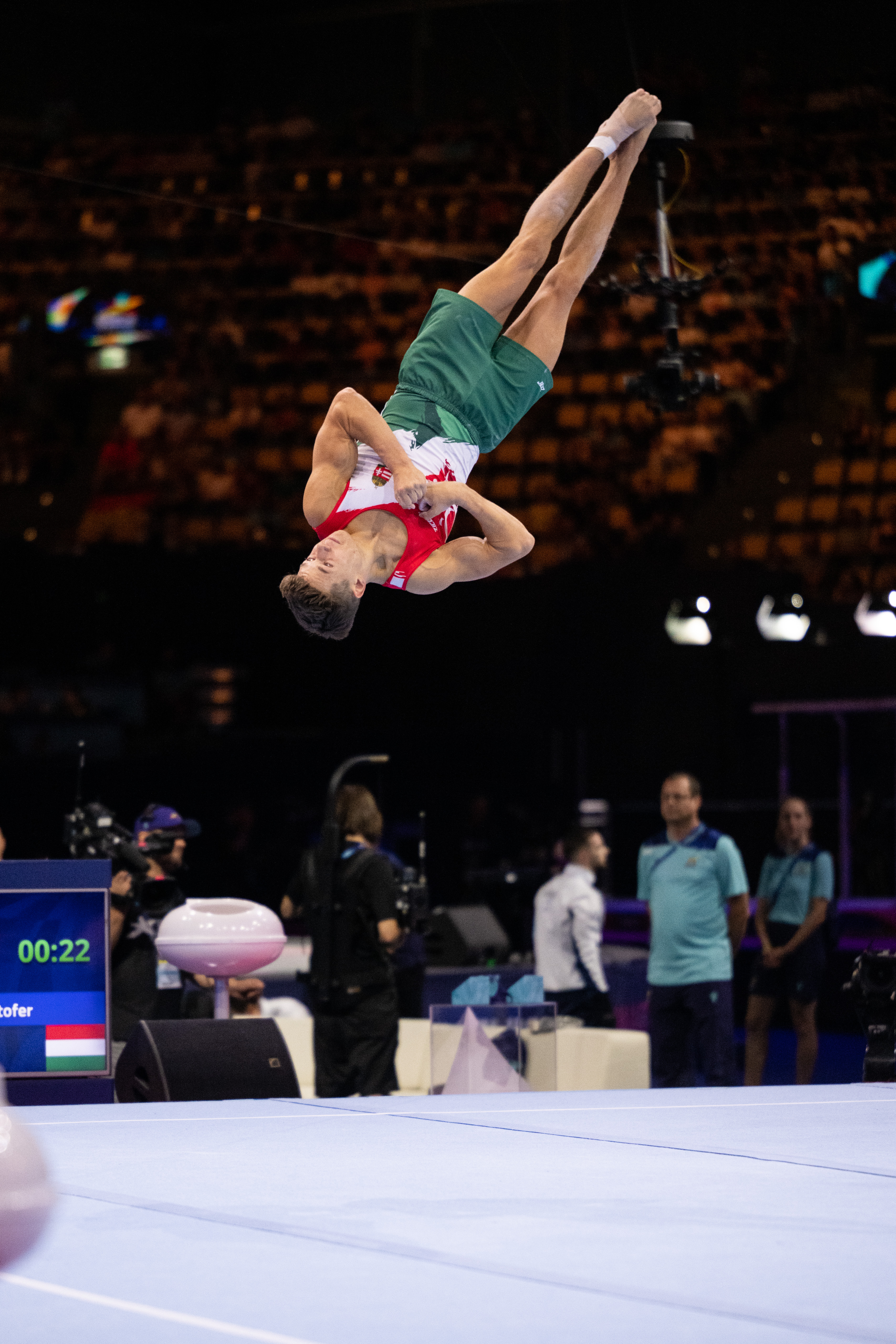
(Hungary) Krisztofer Mészáros at the
2022 European Championships

=== Men only ===
==== Pommel horse ====
A typical pommel horse exercise involves both single-leg and double-leg work. Single-leg skills are generally found in the form of "scissors". In double leg work, the gymnast swings both legs in a circular motion (clockwise or counterclockwise, depending on preference). To make the exercise more challenging, gymnasts will often include variations on typical circling skills by turning ("moores" and "spindles") or by straddling their legs ("flares"). Routines end when the gymnast performs a dismount by swinging his body over the horse or landing after a handstand.

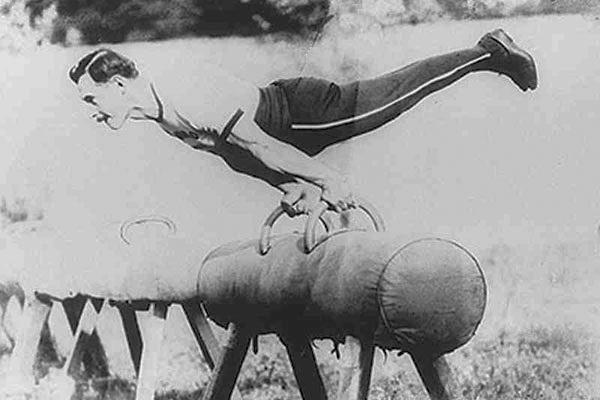
(Italy) Alberto Braglia at the
1908 Olympic Games

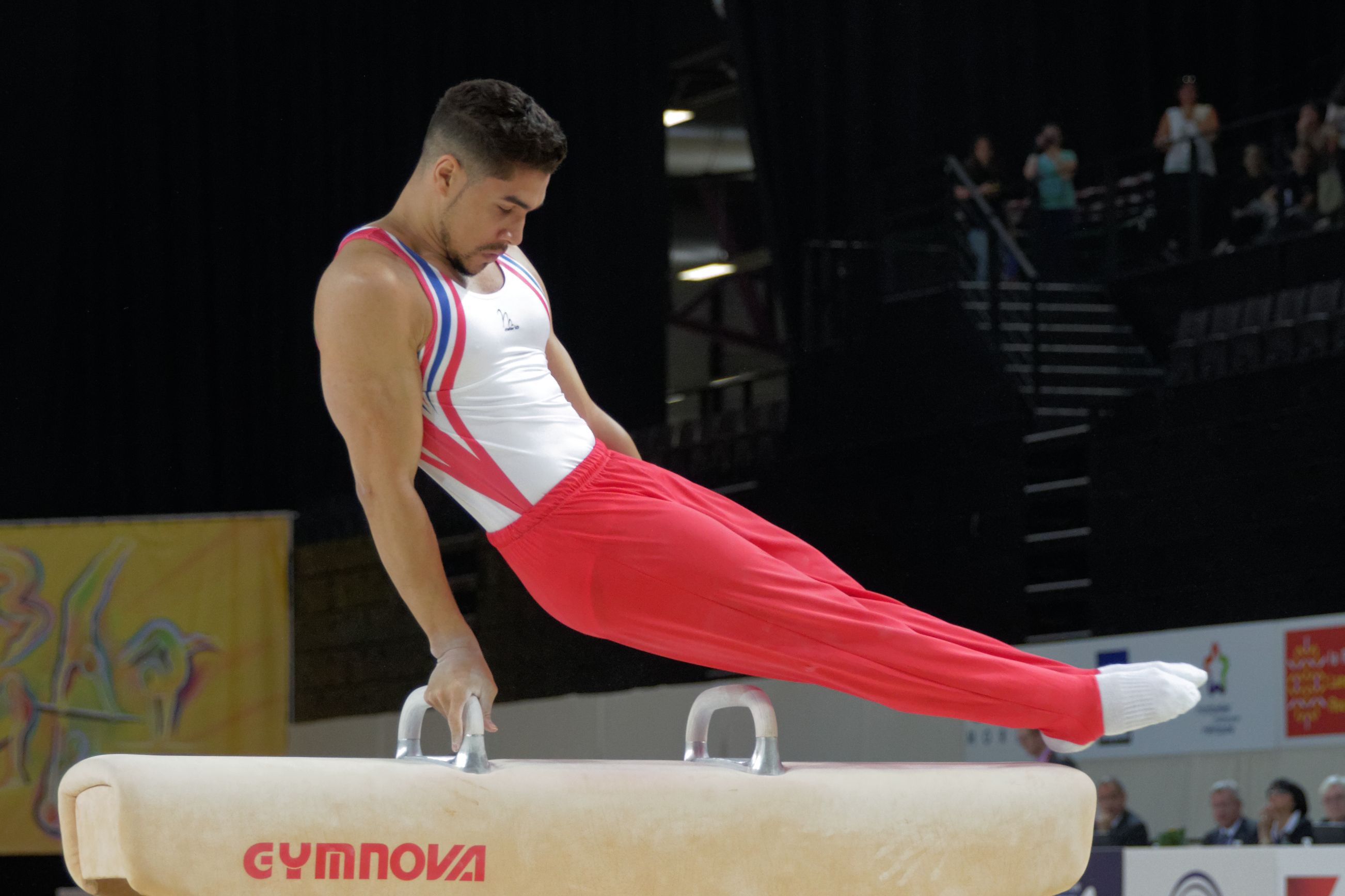
(United Kingdom) Louis Smith at the
2015 European Championships

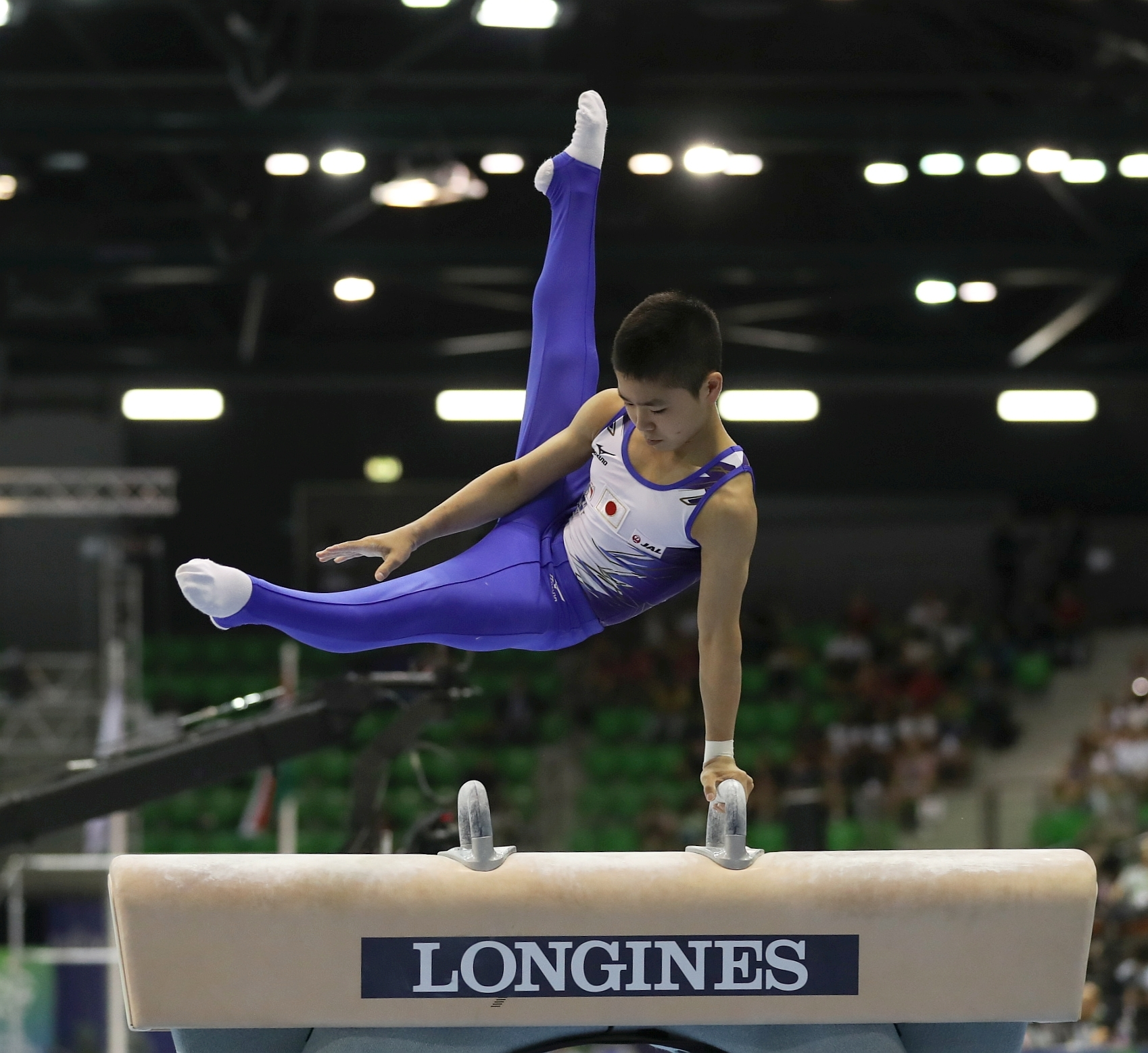
(Japan) Shinnosuke Oka at the
2019 Junior World Championships

==== Still rings ====
The still rings are suspended on wire cable from a point 5.8 m (19 ft) off the floor and adjusted in height so the gymnast has room to hang freely and swing. Gymnasts must demonstrate balance, strength, power, and dynamic motion while preventing the rings themselves from swinging. At least one static strength move is required, but some gymnasts include two or three.

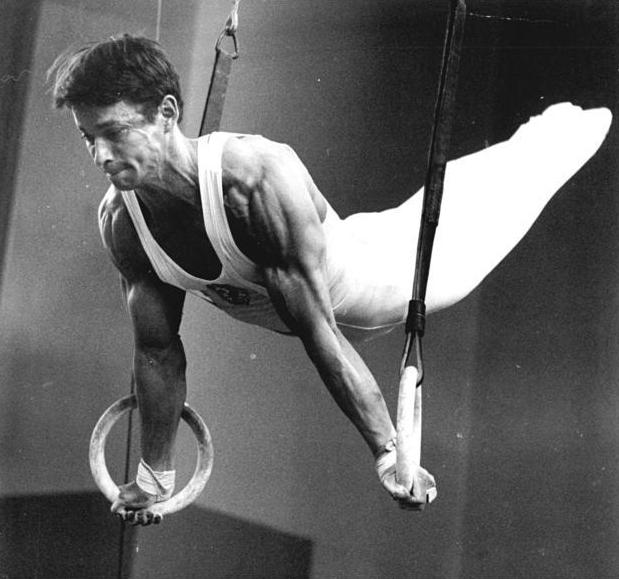
(East Germany) Klaus Köste in 1974

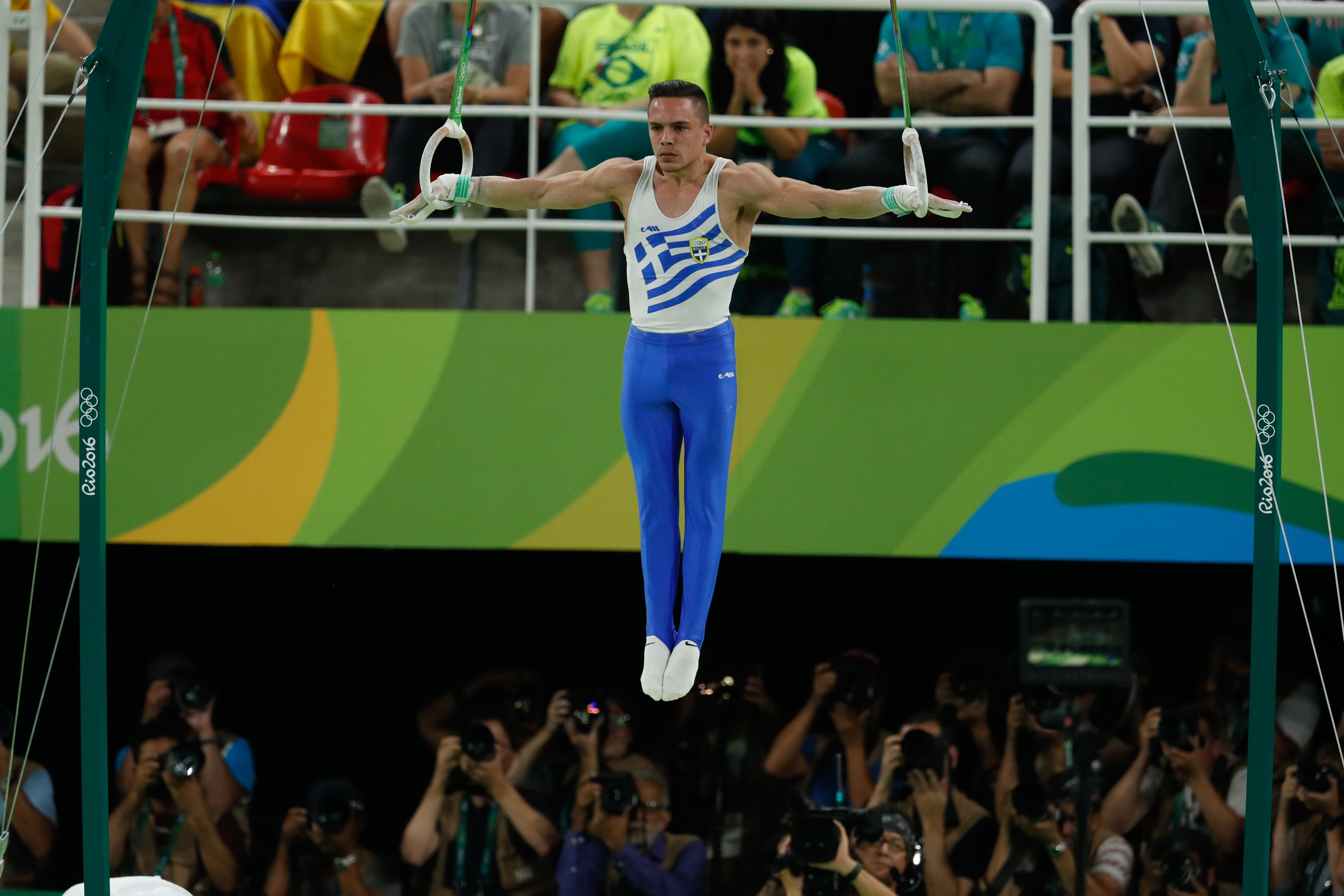
(Greece) Eleftherios Petrounias at the
2016 Summer Olympics

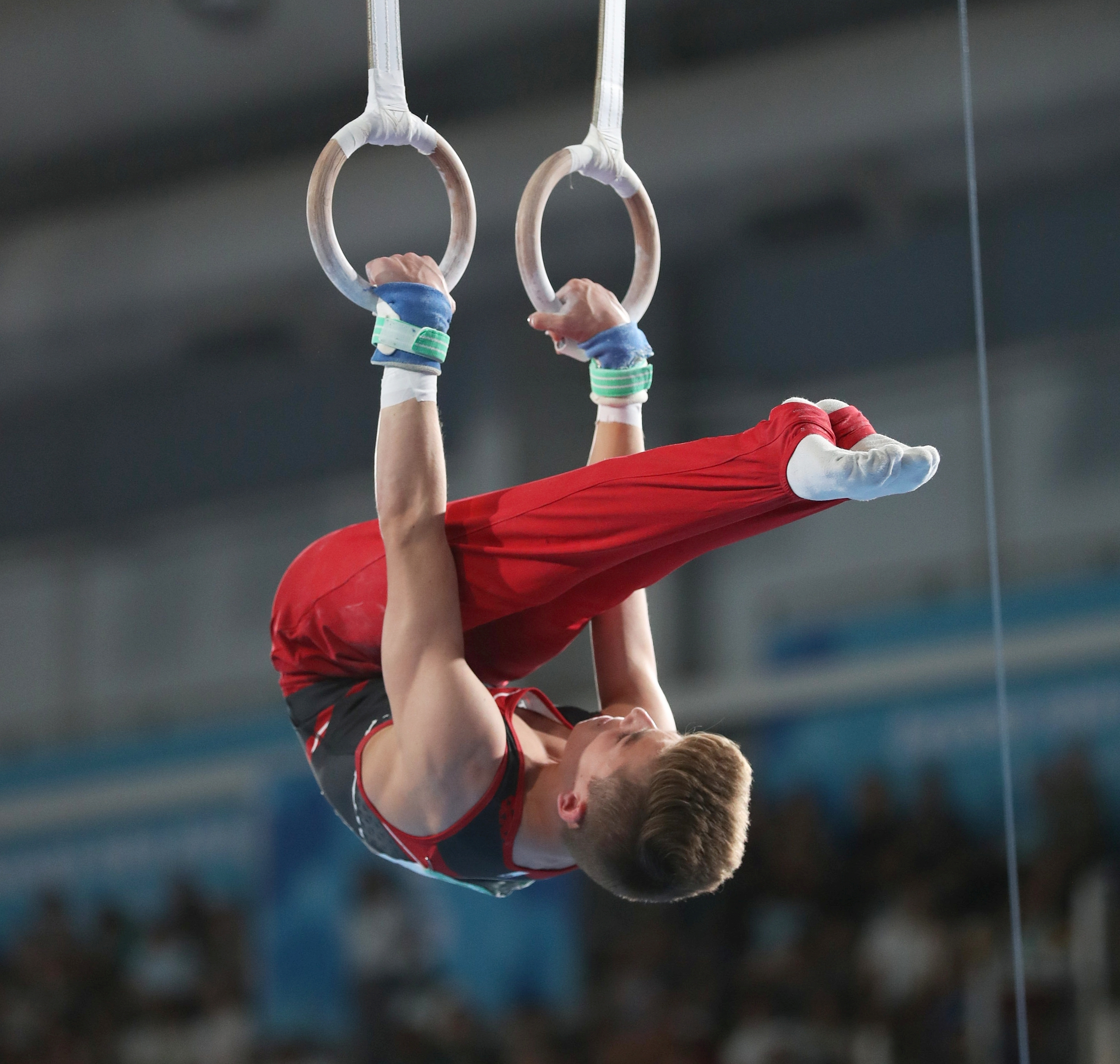
(Canada) Félix Dolci at the
2018 Youth Olympics

==== Parallel bars ====
The parallel bars consist of two bars slightly further than shoulder-width apart and usually 1.75 m (5.7 ft) high. Gymnasts execute a series of swings, balancing moves, and releases that require strength and coordination.

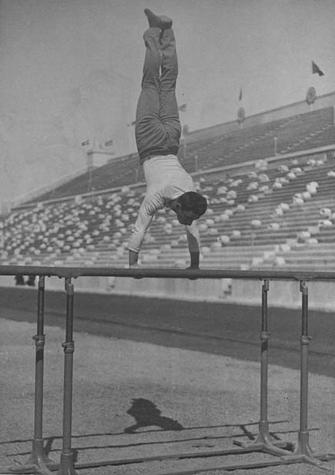
Alfred Flatow (GER) at the 1896 Olympic Games

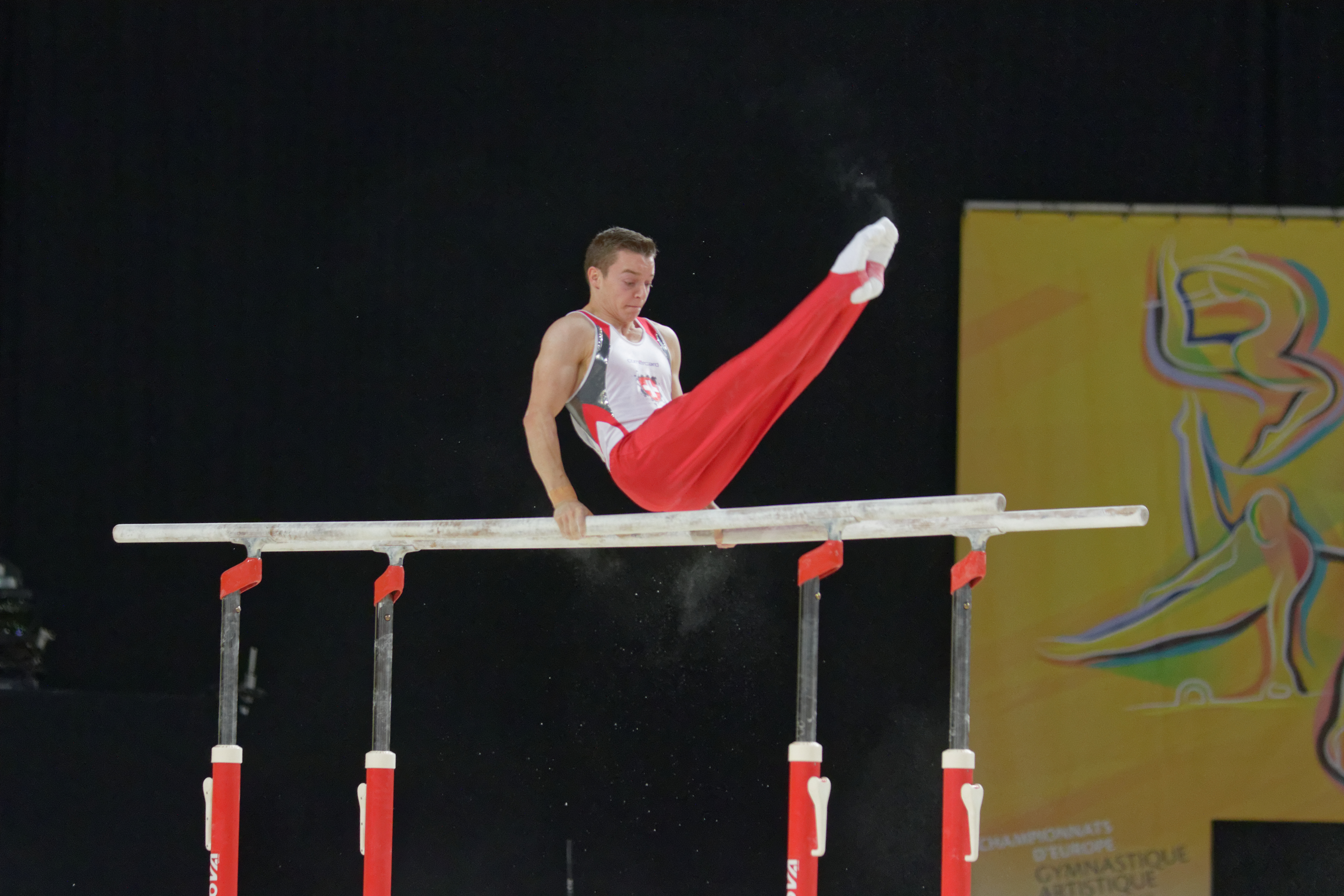
(Switzerland) Christian Baumann at the
2015 European Championships

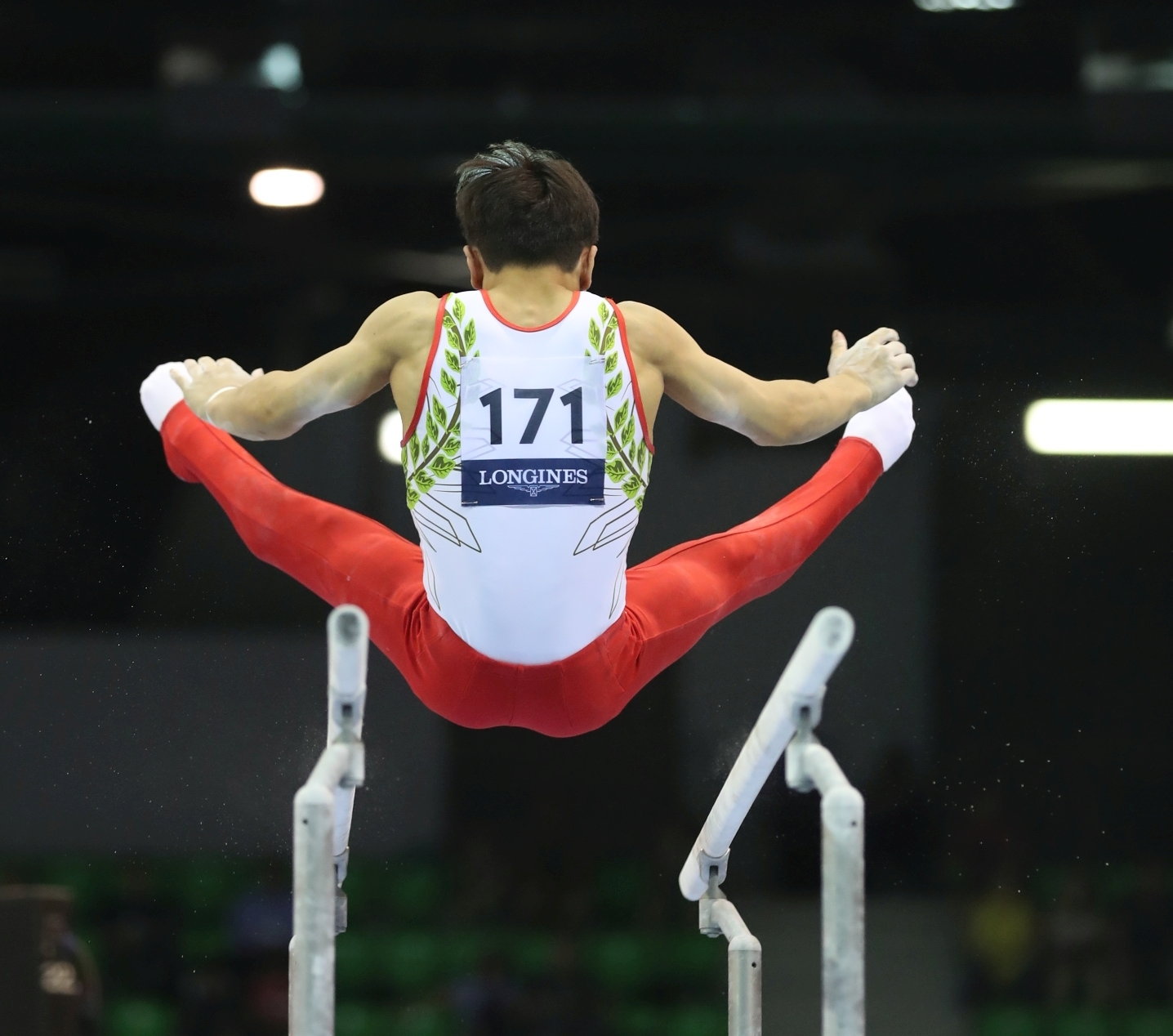
(Japan) Takeru Kitazono at the
2019 Junior World Championships

==== Horizontal bar ====
The horizontal bar (also known as the high bar) is a 2.4 cm (0.94 in) thick steel bar raised 2.5 m (8.2 ft) above the ground. The gymnast performs 'giants' (360-degree revolutions around the bar), release skills, twists, and direction changes. Using the momentum from giants, enough height can be achieved for spectacular dismounts, such as a triple-back somersault. Leather grips are usually used to help maintain a hold on the bar.

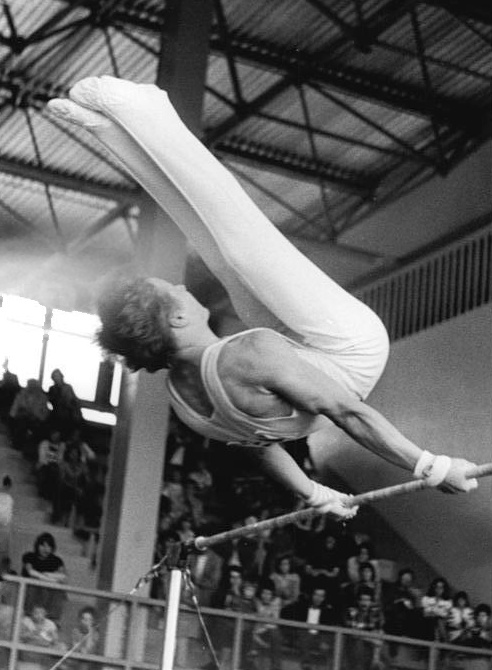
(East Germany) Ralf-Peter Hemmann
in 1978

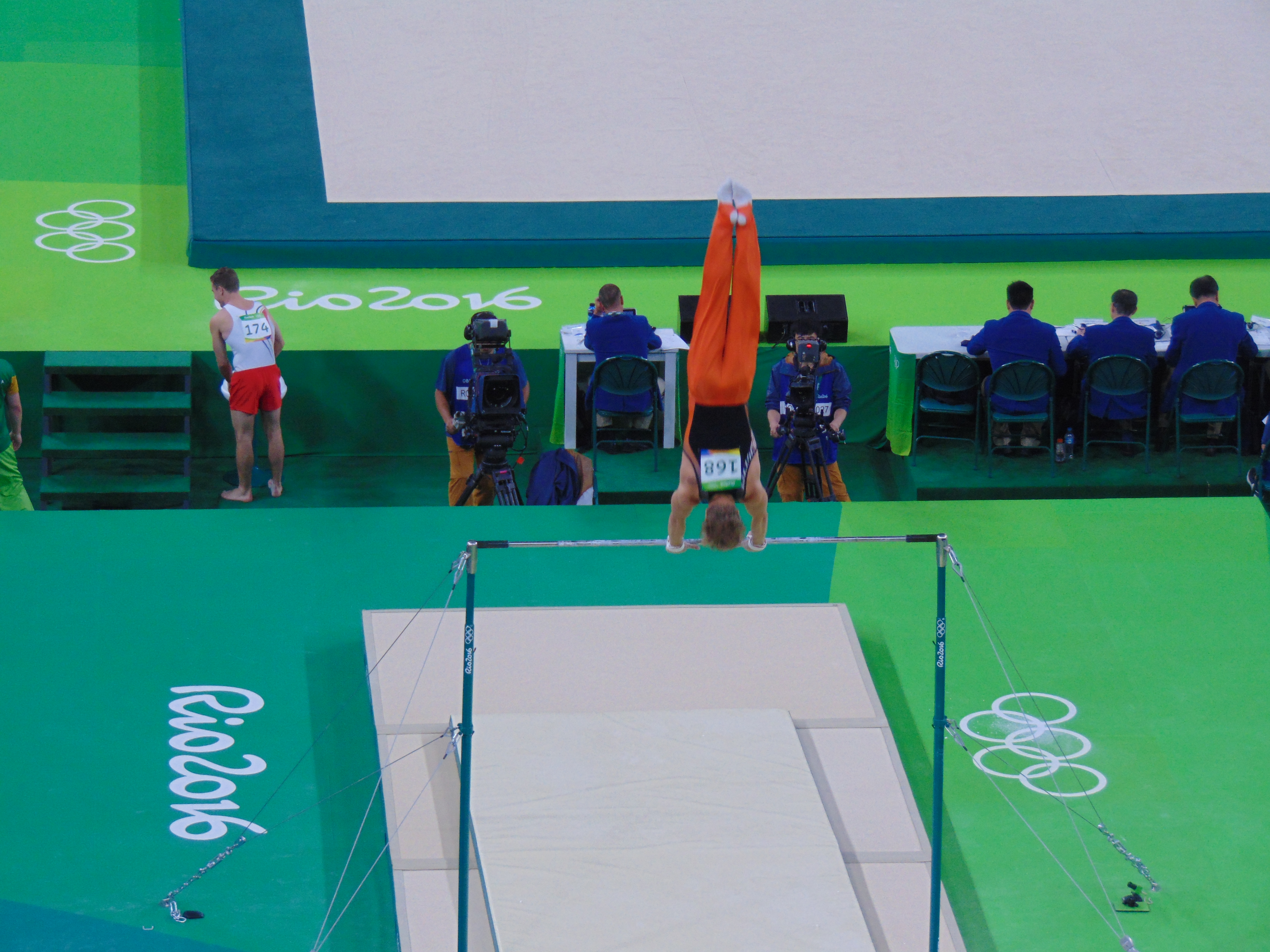
(Netherlands) Epke Zonderland at the
2016 Olympic Games

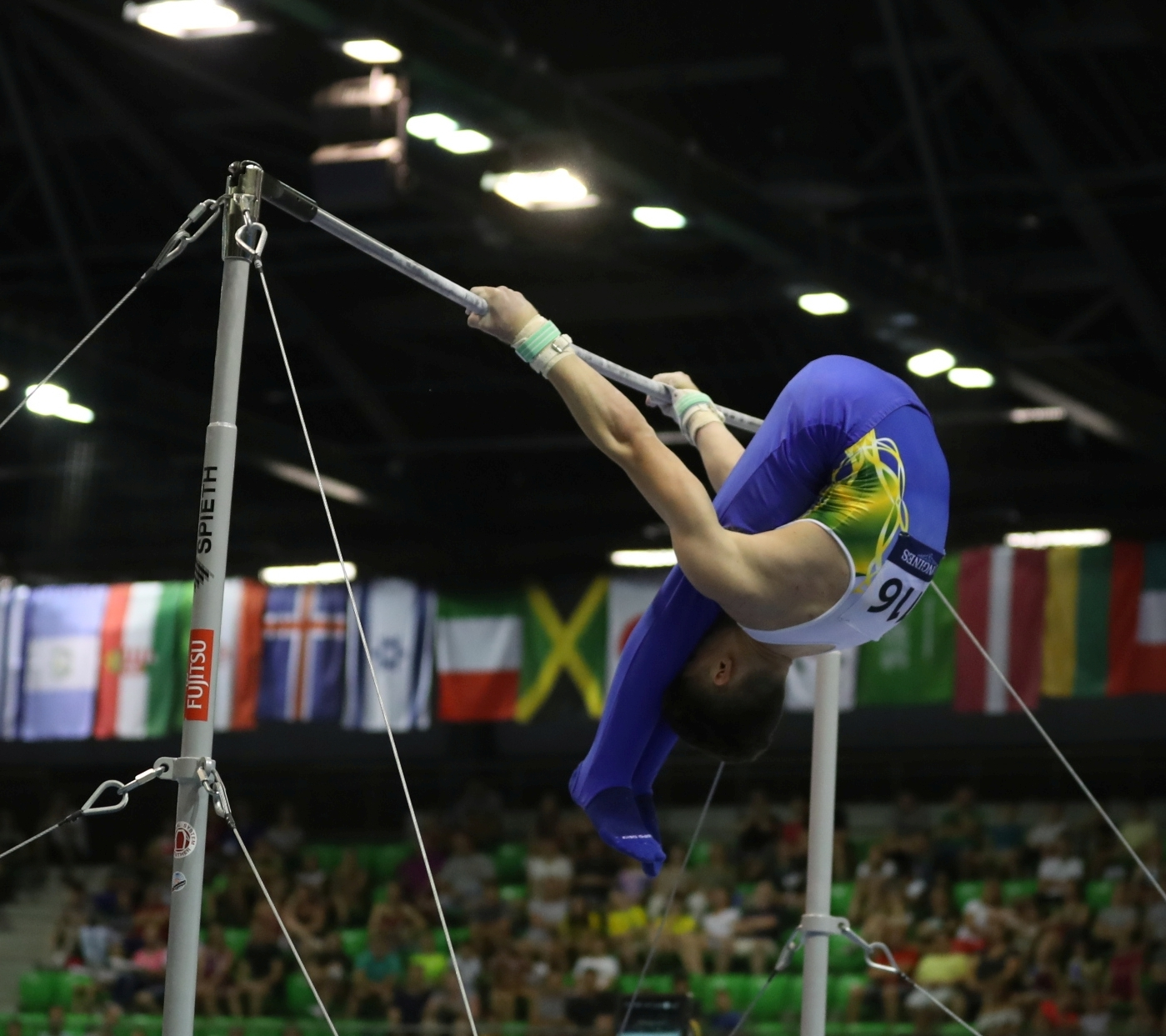
(Brazil) Diogo Soares at the
2019 Junior World Championships

=== Women only ===
==== Uneven bars ====
The uneven bars (known as asymmetric bars in the United Kingdom) were adapted by the Czechoslovak Sokol from the men's parallel bars sometime before World War I and were shown in international exhibition for the first time at the 1928 Summer Olympics in Amsterdam. They consist of two horizontal bars set at different heights. Gymnasts perform swings, pirouettes, transition moves between the bars, and releases.

Higher-level gymnasts usually wear leather grips to ensure a firm hold on the bars while protecting their hands from painful blisters and tears (known as rips). Gymnasts sometimes wet their grips with water from a spray bottle and may apply chalk to prevent the grips from slipping. Chalk may also be applied to the hands and bar if grips are not worn.

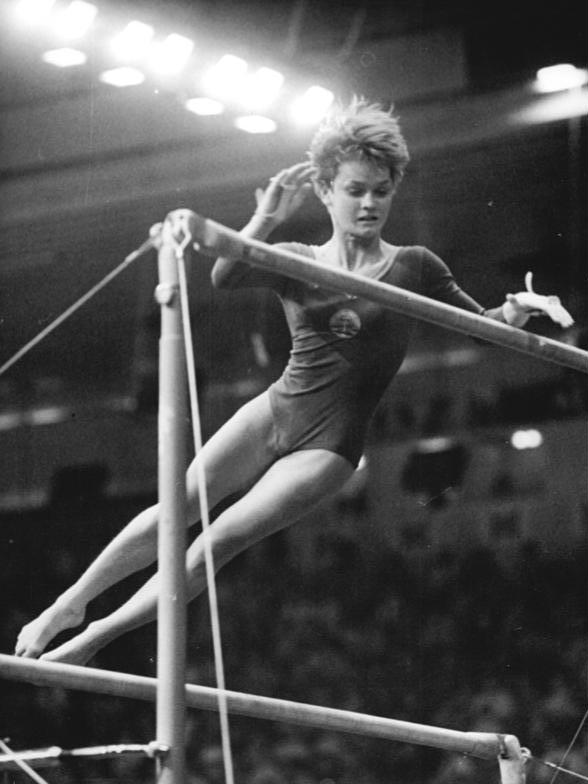
(East Germany) Karin Büttner-Janz
in 1971

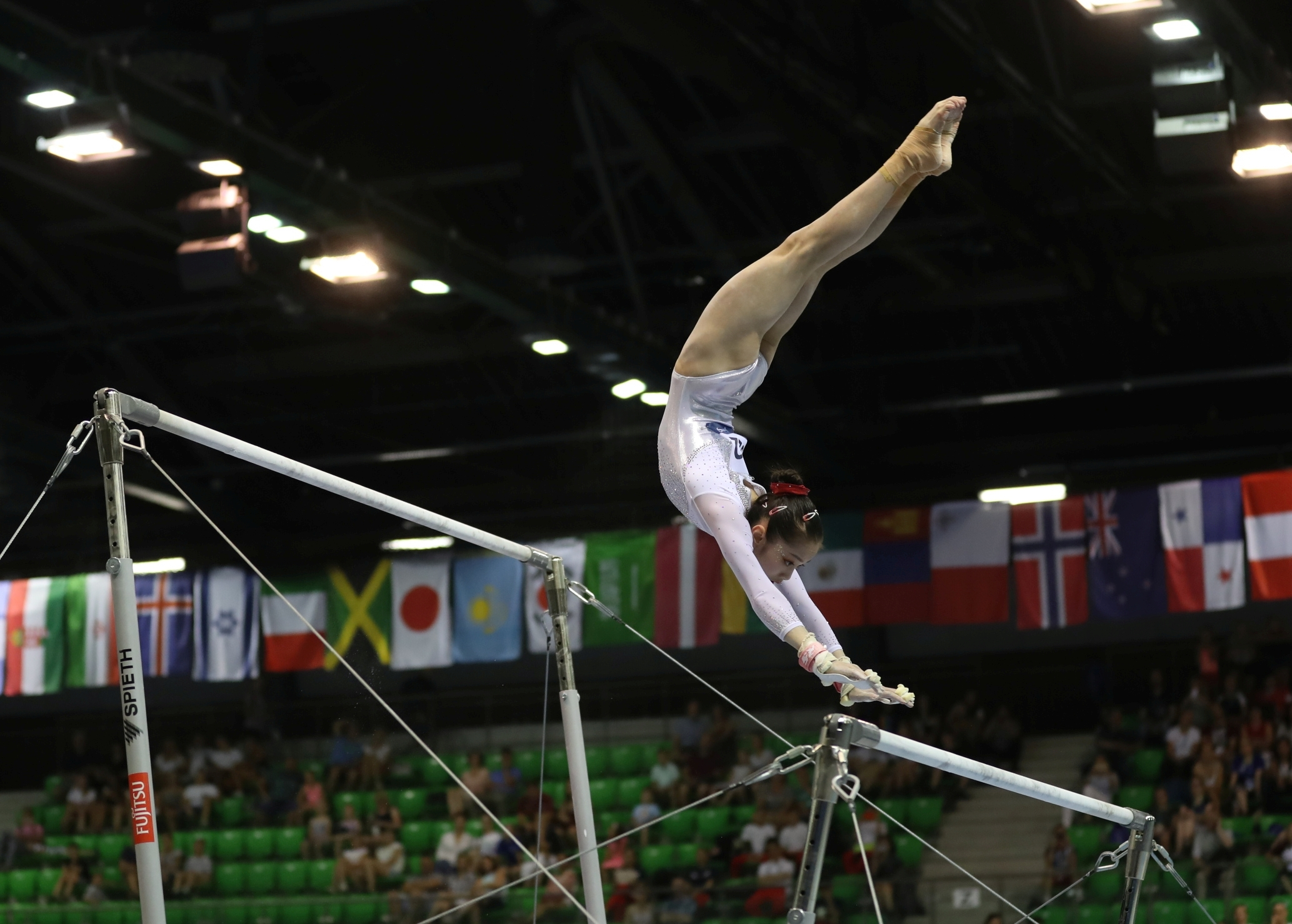
(China) Wei Xiaoyuan at the
2019 Junior World Championships

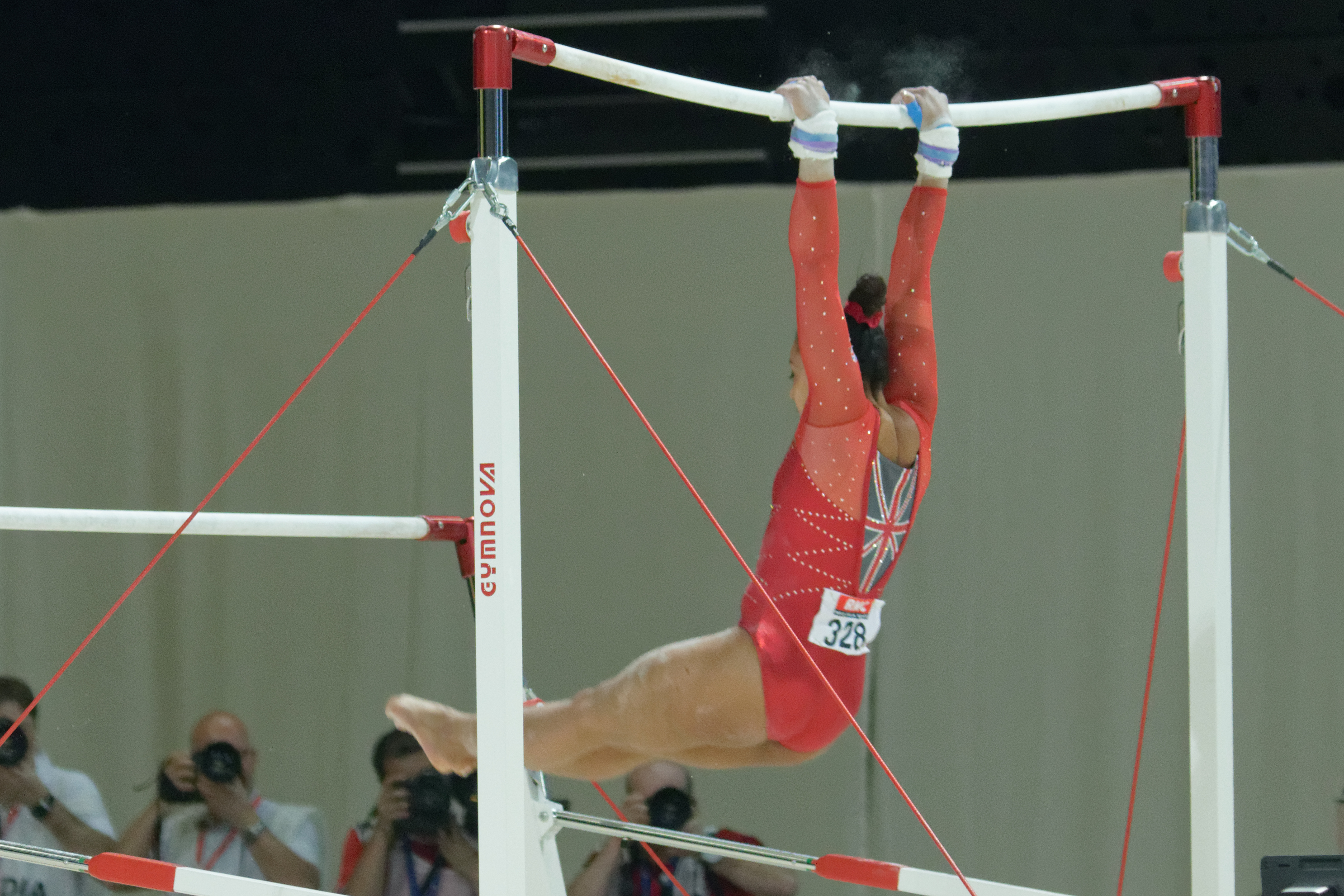
(United Kingdom) Becky Downie at the
2015 European Championships

==== Balance beam ====
The balance beam existed as early as the 1880s in the form of a "low beam" close to the floor. By the 1920s, the beam was raised much higher due to Swedish influence on the sport.

Gymnasts perform routines ranging from 70 to 90 seconds long, consisting of leaps, acrobatic skills, turns, and dance elements on a padded spring beam. Apparatus norms set by the FIG specify that the beam must be 125 cm (4 ft) high, 500 cm (16 ft) long, and 10 cm (3.9 in) wide. The event requires balance, flexibility, and strength.

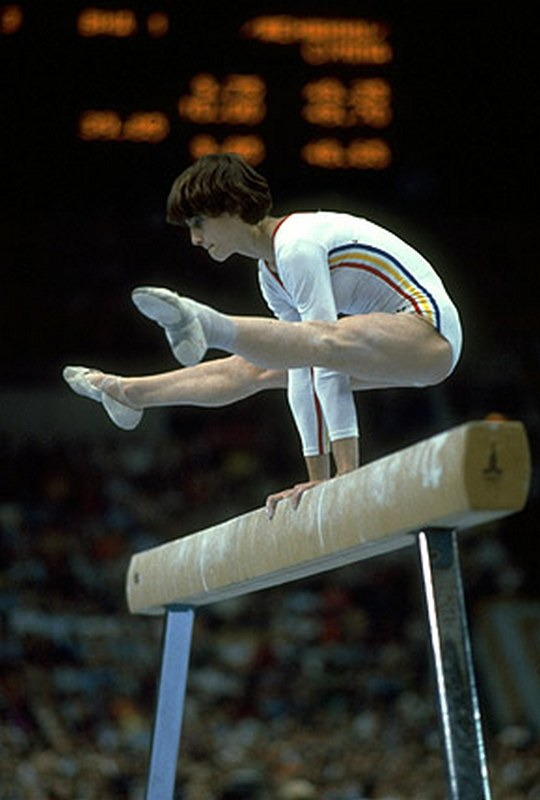
(Romania) Nadia Comăneci at the 1980 Olympic Games

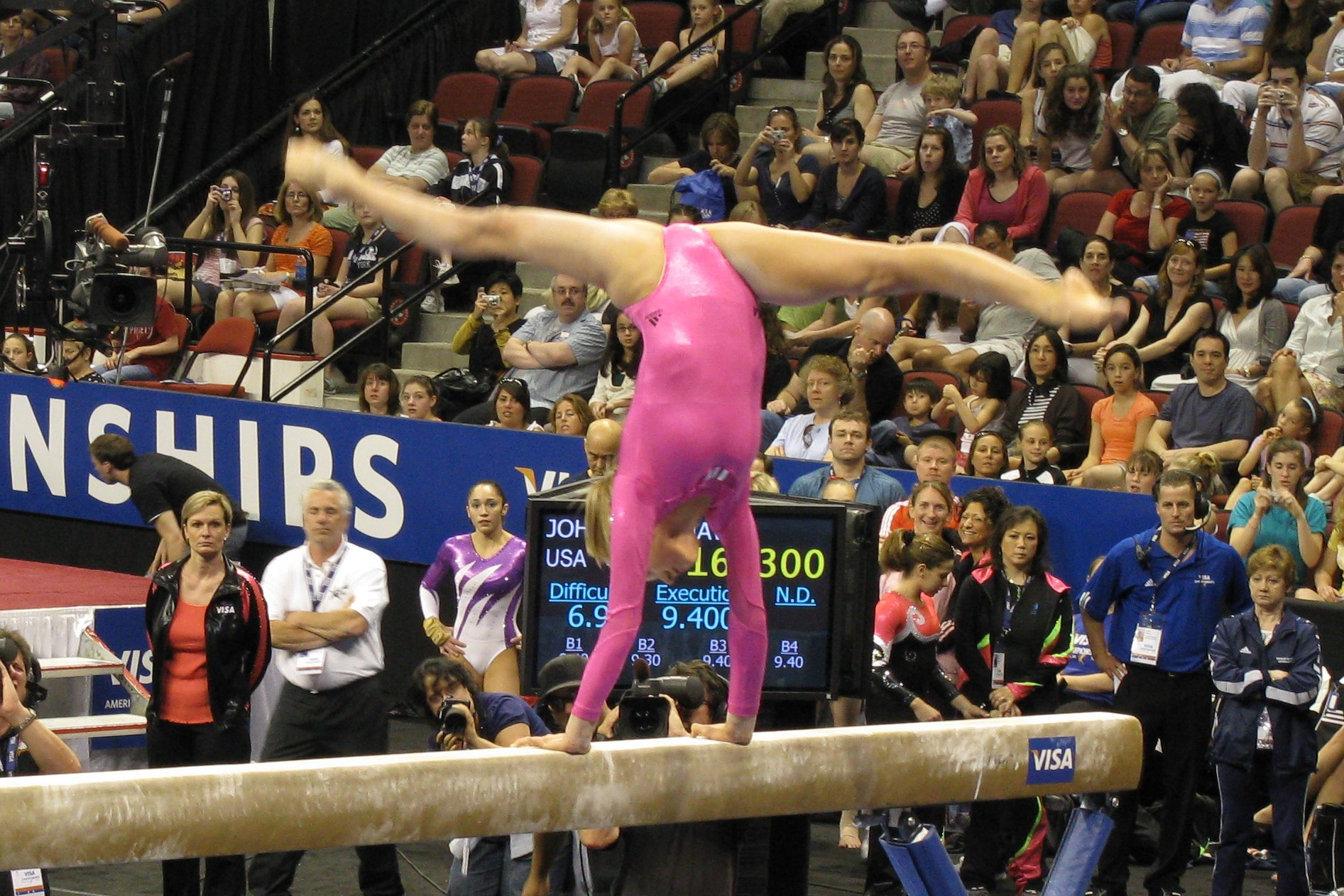
(United States) Nastia Liukin at the
2008 USA National Championships

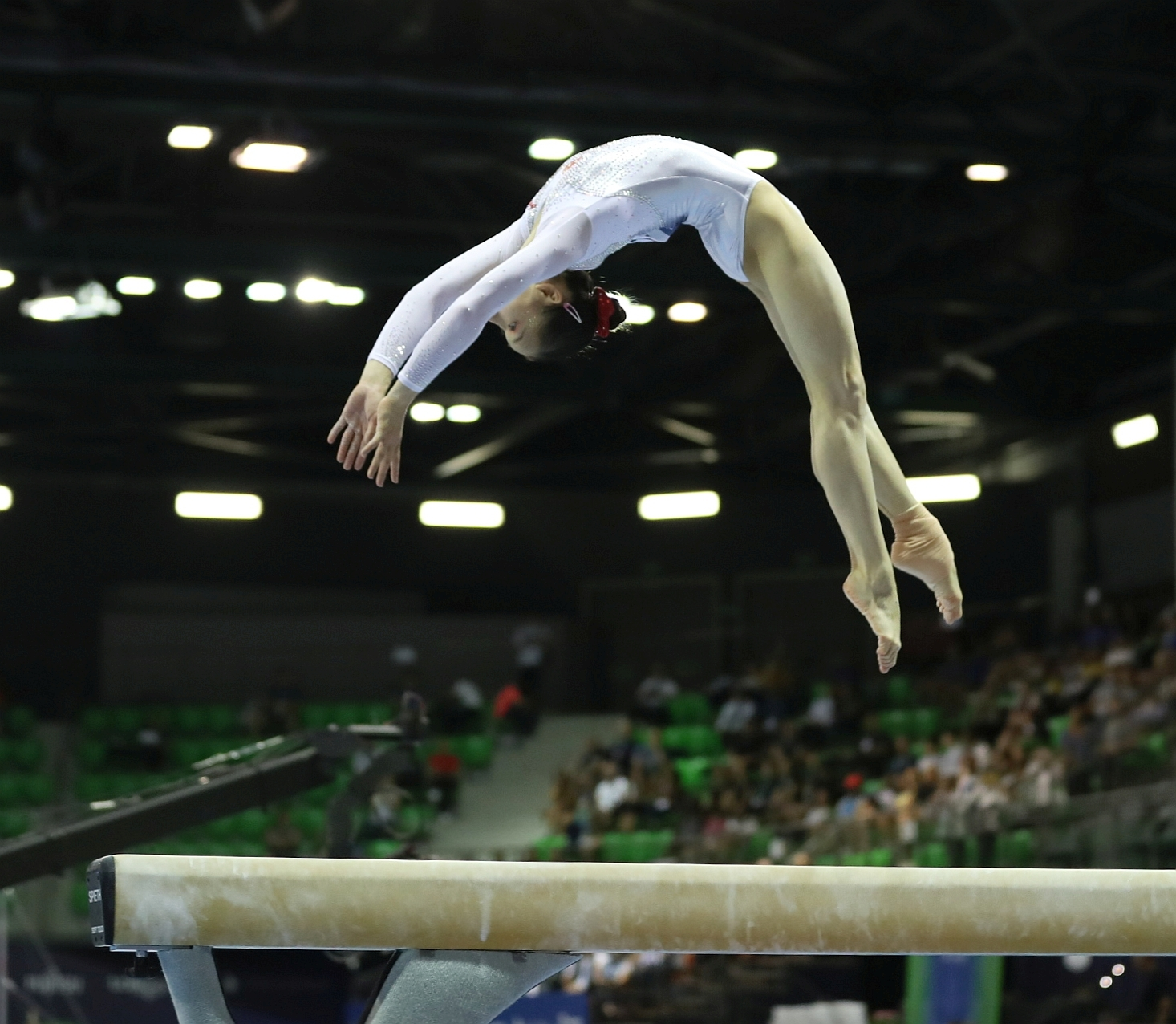
(China) Ou Yushan at the
2019 Junior World Championships

== Competition format ==
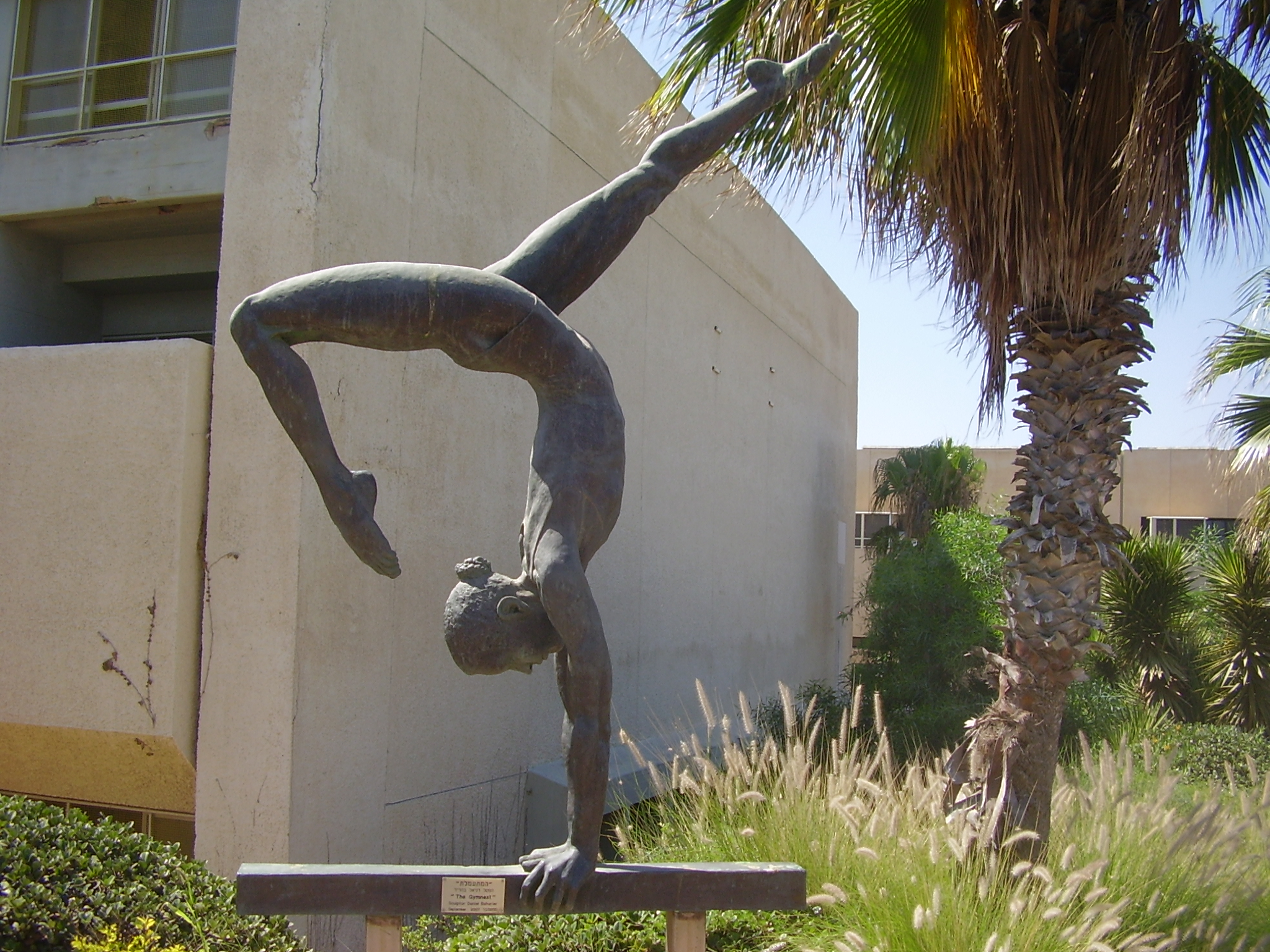
A sculpture of a gymnast at the Wingate Institute in Israel.

In Olympic and World Championship competitions, meets are divided into several sessions on different days: qualifications, team finals, all-around finals, and event finals.

During the qualification round (abbreviated TQ), gymnasts compete with their national squad in all four (WAG) or six (MAG) events. The scores from this session are not used to award medals but rather to determine which teams advance to the team finals and which individual gymnasts advance to the all-around and event finals. For the 2020 Olympics, teams will consist of four gymnasts, with up to two additional gymnasts per country allowed to compete as individuals. The format of team qualifications is 4–4–3, meaning that all four gymnasts compete in each event, but only the top three scores count. Individual gymnasts may qualify for the all-around and event finals, but their scores do not count toward the team's total.

In the team finals (abbreviated TF), gymnasts compete with their national squad on all four or six events. The scores from the session determine the medalists in the team competition. The format is 4–3–3, meaning that of the four gymnasts on the team, three compete in each event, and all three scores count.

In the all-around finals (abbreviated AA), gymnasts compete individually in all four or six events; their totals determine the all-around medals. Only two gymnasts per country may advance to the all-around finals from the qualification round.

In the event finals (abbreviated EF) or apparatus finals, the top eight gymnasts in each event (as determined by scores in the qualification round) compete for medals. Only two gymnasts per country may advance to each event final.

Competitions other than the Olympics and World Championships may use different formats. For instance, the 2007 Pan American Games had only one team competition day with a 6–5–4 format, and three athletes per country were allowed to advance to the all-around. The team event is not contested in other meets, such as on the World Cup circuit.

=== New life ===
Since 1989, competitions have used the "new life" rule, under which scores from one session do not carry over to the next. In other words, a gymnast's performance in team finals does not affect their scores in the all-around finals or event finals, and marks from the team qualifying round do not count toward the team finals.

Before this rule was introduced, the scores from the team competition carried over into the all-around and event finals. Final results and medal placement were determined by combining the following scores:

Qualifiers for all-around and event finals
Team compulsories + team optionals
Team competition
Team compulsories + team optionals
All-around competition
Team results (compulsories and optionals) averaged + all-around
Event finals
Team results (compulsories and optionals) averaged + event final

=== Compulsories ===
Until 1997, the team competition consisted of two sessions, with every gymnast performing standardized compulsory routines in the preliminaries and individualized optional routines on the second day. Team medals were determined based on the combined scores of both days, as were the qualifiers to the all-around and event finals. However, the all-around and event finals did not include compulsory routines.

In meets where team titles were not contested, such as the American Cup, there were two days of all-around competition: one for compulsories and another for optionals.

While each gymnast and their coach developed optional routines in accordance with the Code of Points and the gymnast's strengths, compulsory routines were created and choreographed by the FIG Technical Committee. The dance and tumbling skills were generally less demanding than those in optional routines, but perfect technique, form, and execution were heavily emphasized. Scoring was exacting, with judges taking deductions for even slight deviations from the required choreography. For this reason, many gymnasts and coaches considered compulsories more challenging than optionals.

Compulsory exercises were eliminated at the end of 1996. The move was highly controversial, with many successful gymnastics federations—including the United States, Russia, and China—arguing that the compulsory exercises helped maintain a high standard of form, technique, and execution among gymnasts. Opponents of compulsory exercises believed that they harmed emerging gymnastics programs.

Some members of the gymnastics community still argue that compulsories should be reinstated, and many gymnastics federations have maintained compulsories in their national programs. Often, gymnasts competing at the lower levels of the sport—for instance, Levels 2–5 in USA Gymnastics, Grade 2 in South Africa, and Levels 3–6 in Australia—only perform compulsory routines.

=== Competition levels ===
Artistic gymnasts compete only with other gymnasts at their level. Each athlete starts at the lowest level and advances to higher levels by learning more complex skills and achieving qualifying scores at competitions.

==== United States ====
In the United States, whose program is governed by USA Gymnastics, levels range from 1 to 10, followed by elite. Levels 1 to 2 are usually considered recreational or beginner; 3 to 6 intermediate; and 7 to elite advanced. Competitions begin at Level 3 or, in some gyms, Level 2. A gymnast must be able to perform specific skills in each event to advance to the next level. Once a gymnast has competed in a sectional meet at a given level, they may not drop back to a lower level in the same competitive season. Gymnasts in Levels 1–2 perform basic skills such as handstands and cartwheels. Levels 3–5 consist of compulsory routines; 6 is an in-between level with strict requirements but some leeway for gymnasts to show their creativity; and Levels 7–10 consist of optional routines. Only elite gymnasts compete in accordance with the FIG's Code of Points; lower levels have a modified code.

The elite program is divided into two categories: junior for gymnasts younger than 16, and senior for gymnasts 16 and older. (Gymnasts are allowed to compete at the senior level at the beginning of the calendar year in which they will turn 16.) Olympic teams are chosen from the senior elite program.

==== United Kingdom ====
The British Gymnastics level system goes from 5 (lowest) to 2, and there are separate tracks for elite- and club-level competition.

==== Canada ====
There are several competitive streams in Canadian gymnastics: recreational, developmental, pre-competitive, provincial, national, and high-performance. Provincial levels range from 5 (lowest) to 1; national levels are pre-novice, novice, open, and high performance; and high-performance levels are novice, junior, and senior.

==== Germany ====
In Germany, there are different competitive systems for recreational and high-performance gymnasts. Recreational gymnasts have a system of compulsory exercises from 1 to 9 and optional exercises from 4 to 1, with modified Code of Points requirements. For high-performance and junior athletes, there are compulsory and optional requirements defined by age, from ages 6 to 18.

=== Age requirements ===
The FIG imposes a minimum age requirement on gymnasts competing in certain international meets, but it does not impose a maximum age limit. The term senior refers to world-class or elite gymnasts who are age-eligible under FIG rules: Female gymnasts must be at least 16 or turning 16 within the calendar year, and the minimum age for men is 18. The term junior refers to any gymnast who competes at a world-class or elite level but is too young to be classified as a senior.

Juniors are judged under the same Code of Points as seniors and often exhibit the same difficulty level in their routines. Still, they cannot compete at the Olympics, World Championships, or World Cups. Many meets, such as the European Championships, have separate divisions for juniors. But some competitions, such as the Goodwill Games, the Pan American Games, the Pacific Rim Championships, and the All-Africa Games, permit seniors and juniors to compete together.

The age requirement is contentious and is frequently debated by coaches, gymnasts, and other members of the gymnastics community. Those in favor of the age limits argue that they promote the participation of older athletes and spare younger gymnasts from the stress of competition and high-level training. Opponents point out that junior gymnasts are scored under the same Code of Points as the seniors (with some restrictions) and train mainly with the same skills. They also argue that younger gymnasts need the experience of competing in major events to improve as athletes.

Since stricter age requirements were adopted in the early 1980s, there have been several well-documented and many more suspected cases of juniors with falsified documents competing as seniors. The FIG has only taken disciplinary action in three cases: those of Kim Gwang-Suk of North Korea, who competed at the 1989 World Artistic Gymnastics Championships when she may have been as young as 11; Hong Su-jong of North Korea, who competed under three different birth dates in the 2000s; and China's Dong Fangxiao, who competed at the 2000 Olympics when she was 14.

=== Scoring ===
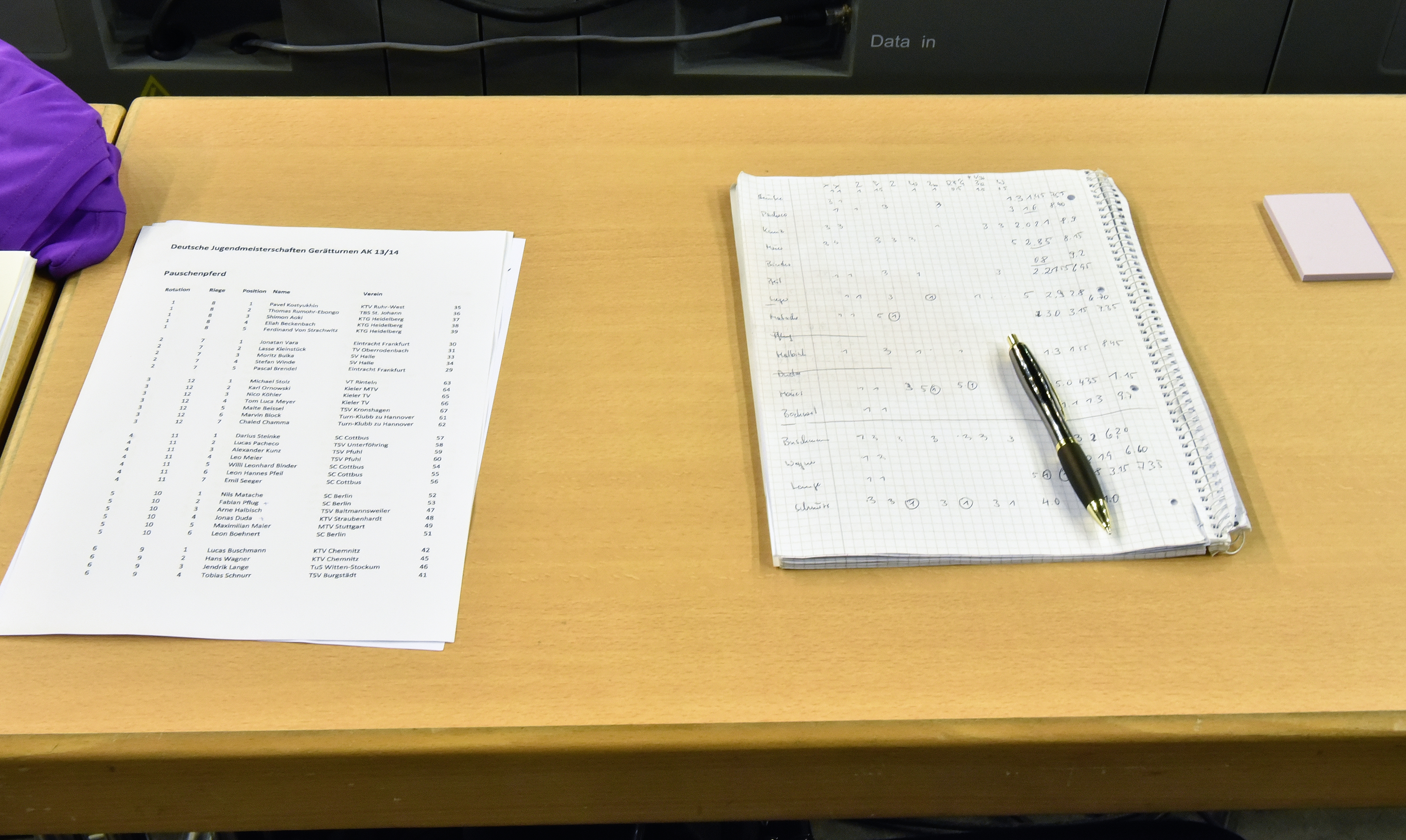
A judge's point deductions at a competition

Scoring at the international level is regulated by the Code of Points.

Under the system established in 2006, two panels judge each routine, evaluating different aspects of the performance. The D score covers skill requirements, difficulty value, and connection value (for skills performed back to back with no pause in between); the E score covers execution and artistry; the two are added together to produce final scores. The maximum E score is 10, but there is no cap on the D score. Theoretically, this means scores could be infinite. However, average marks for routines in major competitions have generally been in the low to mid-teens.

This system, with its open-ended difficulty score, is very different from the one used for most of the sport's history. Before 2006, the highest possible score was a "perfect 10". Every routine was assigned a start value (SV) based on difficulty. A routine that included all required elements received a base SV—9.4 in 1996, 9.0 in 1997, 8.8 in 2001—and gymnasts could increase their SV to a maximum of 10 by performing more challenging skills and combinations. Then, to score a gymnast's routine, judges deducted from the SV for errors in execution.

Some gymnasts and coaches—including Olympic gold medalists Lilia Podkopayeva, Svetlana Boginskaya, Shannon Miller, and Vitaly Scherbo, and Romanian team coach Nicolae Forminte — publicly opposed the new Code of Points when it was first announced. In addition, a 2006 report from the FIG Athletes' Commission cited significant concerns about scoring, judging, and other subjects. Aspects of the code were revised in 2007, but there are no plans to return to the "perfect 10" format.

== Major competitions ==
=== Global ===
- Olympic Games: Artistic gymnastics is one of the most popular events at the Summer Olympics, held every four years. Countries qualify teams based on their performance at the World Championships the year before the Games. Nations not qualifying to send an entire team may be eligible to send one or two individual gymnasts.
- World Championships: The gymnastics-only World Championships is open to teams from every FIG member nation. The competition has different formats depending on the year: full team finals, all-around, and event finals; all-around and event finals only; or event finals only. Since 2019, the Junior World Championships have been held every two years.
- The Artistic Gymnastics World Cup and World Challenge Cup Series
- Goodwill Games: Artistic gymnastics was an event at this now-defunct competition.

=== Regional ===
==== Multi-sport ====
- All-Africa Games: Held every four years, and open to teams and gymnasts from African nations.
- Asian Games: Held every four years, and open to teams and gymnasts from Asian nations.
- Central American and Caribbean Games: Held every four years and open to teams and gymnasts from Central America, the Caribbean, Mexico, and the South American countries of Colombia, Guyana, Suriname, and Venezuela.
- Commonwealth Games: Held every four years, and open to teams and gymnasts from Commonwealth nations.
- European Games: Held every four years, and open to teams and gymnastics from European nations.
- Mediterranean Games: Held every four years, and open to gymnasts from nations around or very close to the Mediterranean Sea, where Europe, Africa, and Asia meet.
- Pan American Games: Held every four years, and open to teams and gymnasts from North, South, and Central America.
- South American Games: Held every four years, and open to teams and gymnasts from South American nations.
- Southeast Asian Games: Held every two years, and open to teams and gymnasts from Southeast Asian nations.

==== Gymnastics only ====
- Asian Gymnastics Championships: Open to teams and gymnasts from Asian nations.
- European Championships: Held yearly, and open to teams and gymnasts from European nations.
- Pacific Rim Championships (known as the Pacific Alliance Championships until 2008): Held every two years, and open to teams from members of the Pacific Alliance of National Gymnastics Federations, including the US, China, Australia, Canada, Mexico, New Zealand, and other nations on the Pacific coast.
- Pan American Gymnastics Championships: Held most years when the Pan American Games are not held, and open to teams and gymnasts from North, South, and Central America
- South American Gymnastics Championships: Held most years, and open to teams and gymnasts from South American countries.

=== National ===
Most countries hold a major competition (National Championships, or "Nationals") every year that determines the best-performing all-around gymnasts and event specialists. Based on their scores at Nationals, gymnasts may qualify for their country's national team or be selected for international meets.

== Dominant teams and nations ==
=== USSR and post-Soviet republics ===
Before the breakup of the Soviet Union in 1991, Soviet gymnasts dominated both men's and women's gymnastics, starting with the introduction of the full women's program into the Olympics and the overall increased standardization of the Olympic gymnastics competition format, which happened in 1952.

The Soviet Union had many male stars, such as Olympic all-around champions Viktor Chukarin and Vitaly Scherbo, and female stars, such as Olympic all-around champions Larisa Latynina and Svetlana Boginskaya. From 1952 to 1992 inclusive, the Soviet women's squad won almost every team title in World Championship and Olympic competition, with only four exceptions: the 1984 Olympics, which the country boycotted, and the 1966, 1979, and 1987 World Championships. Most of the top Soviet gymnasts were from the Russian SFSR, the Ukrainian SSR, and the Byelorussian SSR, with the most famous, Olga Korbut, hailing from the latter. The artistry and grace of Korbut, along with that of Nadia Comăneci of Romania, brought unprecedented global popularity to the sport in the early to mid-1970s.

Following the breakup of the Soviet Union, its gymnasts performed together for the last time at the 1992 Summer Olympics as the Unified Team, winning both the men's and women's team competitions.

Russia has continued the Soviet tradition, medaling at every World and Olympic competition in both MAG and WAG disciplines, except at the 2008 Olympics. Ukraine maintained a strong team for more than a decade—Ukrainian Lilia Podkopayeva was the all-around champion at the 1996 Olympics—but it has declined in recent years. Belarus has maintained a strong men's team. Other former republics have been less successful.

=== Romania ===
The Romanian team first achieved wide-scale success at the 1976 Summer Olympics with the performance of Nadia Comăneci, who was the first gymnast to score a perfect 10 in Olympic competition. After that, using the centralized training system pioneered by Béla Károlyi, they remained a dominant force in women's team and individual events for nearly four decades.

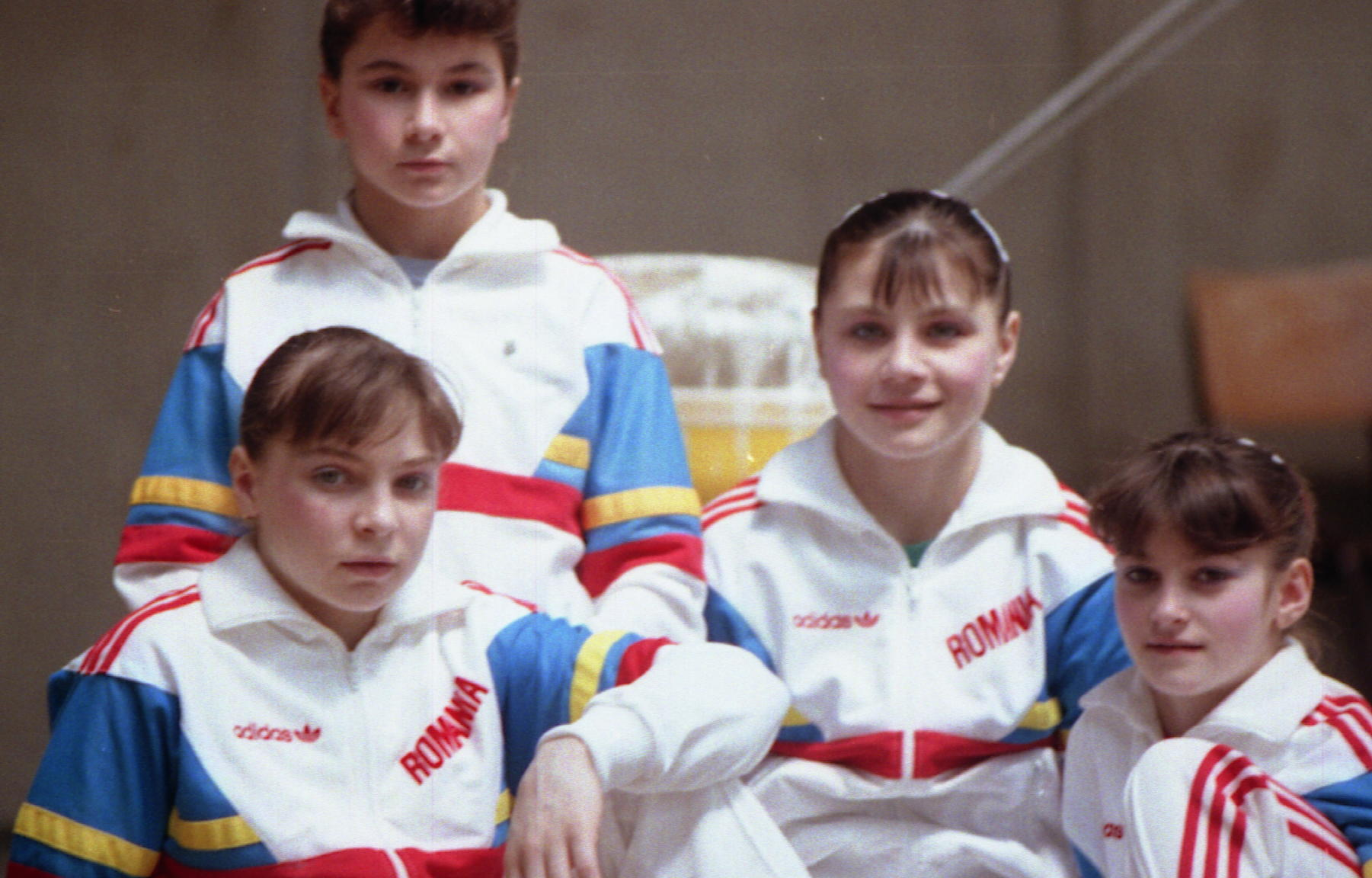
The Romanian team (Daniela Silivaș, Maria Neculiță, Gabriela Potorac, and Cristina Bontaș) at the European Gymnastics Championships in Brussels, May 21, 1989.

Romania was one of only two teams ever to defeat the Soviets in head-to-head World or Olympic competition, winning at the 1979 and 1987 World Championships. (The other was the Czechoslovak women's team at the 1966 World Championships.) The Romanian women also won team medals at every Olympics from 1976 to 2012 inclusive, including gold medals in 1984, 2000, and 2004. At the 16 World Championships from 1978 to 2007 inclusive, they failed to medal only twice (in 1981 and 2006) and won the team title seven times, including five victories in a row (1994–2001). From 1976 to 2000, they placed gymnasts—such as Daniela Silivaș, Lavinia Miloșovici, and Simona Amânar—on the all-around podium at every Olympics, and usually did the same at the World Championships through 2015, including producing World all-around champions Aurelia Dobre (1987) and Maria Olaru (1999).

The decline of Romanian gymnastics began after the 2004 Summer Olympics. At the 2006 World Championships, they failed to medal in the team competition, and only Sandra Izbașa won any individual medals. They won bronze medals at the 2007 World Championships, 2008 Summer Olympics, and 2012 Summer Olympics but failed to medal at the 2010, 2011, or 2014 World Championships.

Things took a drastic turn at the 2015 World Championships, where Romania did not even qualify for the team final. In 2016, it failed to qualify a full team to the 2016 Summer Olympics, placing seventh at the 2016 Gymnastics Olympic Test Event. It earned one Olympic spot, which was filled by 3-time Olympic champion Cătălina Ponor.

At the 2018 World Championships, Romania placed 13th in qualifications and did not make the team final. At the 2019 World Championships, it finished 22nd out of 24 teams—beating only the Czech Republic and Egypt—and again failed to qualify a team to the 2020 Summer Olympics, with only Maria Holbură earning an individual spot. After the Olympics were postponed due to the COVID-19 pandemic, a second Romanian gymnast, Larisa Iordache, earned an individual spot through the 2021 European Championships.

While less successful than the women's program, the Romanian men's program has produced individual medalists such as Marian Drăgulescu and Marius Urzică at World and Olympic competitions.

=== United States ===
While isolated American gymnasts, including Kurt Thomas and Cathy Rigby, won medals at World Championship competitions in the 1970s, the United States team was largely considered a "second power" until the late 1980s, when American gymnasts began medaling consistently in major, fully attended competitions. The defection of Eastern Bloc coaches in the early 1980s, such as the Romanian husband and wife team of Béla and Márta Károlyi, were credited with transforming the coaching of gymnastics in the U.S. and bringing major international success.

At the 1984 Olympics, which the Soviet bloc boycotted, the American men won the gold with a team composed of Bart Conner, Tim Daggett, Mitch Gaylord, Jim Hartung, Scott Johnson, and Peter Vidmar. The women's team—composed of Pam Bileck, Michelle Dusserre, Kathy Johnson, Julianne McNamara, Mary Lou Retton, and Tracee Talavera—won a silver medal, and Retton became the first American Olympic all-around champion.

In 1991, Kim Zmeskal became the first American all-around winner at the World Championships. At the 1992 Olympics, the American women won their first team medal (bronze) at a fully attended Games, as well as their highest all-around ranking, a silver medal for Shannon Miller. In men's gymnastics, Trent Dimas won the horizontal bar final.

The U.S. women's team has become increasingly successful in the modern era, with the 1996 Olympic team victory of the Magnificent Seven, the 2003 Worlds team victory, and multiple medals in both WAG and MAG at the 2004 Olympics. At the 2012 Olympics and 2016 Olympics, the U.S. women won the team gold. The United States has produced the last six women's Olympic all-around champions—Carly Patterson (2004), Nastia Liukin (2008), Gabby Douglas (2012), Simone Biles (2016, 2024) and Sunisa Lee (2021)—as well as individual gymnasts such as World all-around champions Zmeskal (1991), Shannon Miller (1993, 1994), Chellsie Memmel (2005), Shawn Johnson (2007), Bridget Sloan (2009), Jordyn Wieber (2011), Biles (2013, 2014, 2015, 2018, 2019, 2023), and Morgan Hurd (2017). At the 2005 World Championships, American women won the gold and silver in the all-around and in every event final except vault (where Alicia Sacramone placed third). They continue to be one of the most dominant forces in the sport.

The men's team made the medal podium at the 2004, 2008, and 2024 Olympics, as well as the 2003 and 2011 World Championships. Paul Hamm, the most successful U.S. male gymnast, became the first American man to win a World all-around title in 2003. He followed this up by winning the all-around at the 2004 Olympics. Jonathan Horton won a silver medal on the horizontal bar at the 2008 Olympics and a bronze in the all-around at the 2010 World Championships, and Danell Leyva won the all-around bronze medal at the 2012 Olympics and two silver medals (parallel bars and horizontal bar) at the 2016 Olympics.

=== China ===
China has had successful men's and women's programs over the past 25 years. The Chinese men won team gold at the 2000, 2008, and 2012 Olympics and every World Championship team title from 1994 to 2014 (except 2001, when they placed fifth). They have produced individual gymnasts like Olympic all-around champions Li Xiaoshuang (1996) and Yang Wei (2008).

The Chinese women's team won gold at the 2006 World Championships and 2008 Olympics, and has produced individual gymnasts like Mo Huilan, Kui Yuanyuan, Yang Bo, Cheng Fei, Sui Lu, Huang Huidan, Yao Jinnan, and Fan Yilin. Chinese women who have won individual Olympic gold medals are Ma Yanhong, Lu Li, Liu Xuan, He Kexin, Deng Linlin, and Guan Chenchen.

Though for many years considered a two-event team (uneven bars and balance beam), China has developed successful all-arounders like Olympic bronze medalists Liu Xuan (2000), Zhang Nan (2004), and Yang Yilin (2008). Like the Soviet Union, they have been accused of grueling and sometimes cruel training methods, as well as age falsification.

=== Japan ===
The Japanese men's team was dominant during the 1960s and 1970s, winning every Olympic team title from 1960 through 1976 thanks to individual gymnasts such as Olympic all-around champions Sawao Katō and Yukio Endō. Several innovations pioneered by Japanese gymnasts during this era have remained in the sport, including the Tsukahara vault.

More recently, Japanese men have re-emerged as top contenders since winning a team gold at the 2004 Olympics. Six-time World champion and two-time Olympic all-around gold medalist Kōhei Uchimura is widely considered to be the best all-around gymnast ever, and Hiroyuki Tomita won 10 World and Olympic medals from 2003 to 2008.

The women have been less successful, but there have been individual standouts such as Olympic and World medalist Keiko Tanaka-Ikeda, who competed in the 1950s and 1960s, and more recently Koko Tsurumi, Rie Tanaka, Natsumi Sasada, Yuko Shintake, Asuka Teramoto, Sae Miyakawa, Hitomi Hatakeda, Aiko Sugihara, and Mai Murakami. Tsurumi won a bronze medal in the all-around and silver on bars at the 2009 World Championships, and Murakami won gold on floor in 2017, the first Japanese woman to win a World gold medal since Tanaka-Ikeda.

=== Germany ===
The German Democratic Republic, or East Germany, had a very successful gymnastics program before the reunification of Germany. Its MAG and WAG teams frequently won silver or bronze medals at the World Championships and Olympics, led by male gymnasts such as Andreas Wecker and Roland Brückner, and female gymnasts such as Maxi Gnauck, Karin Janz, and Erika Zuchold.

The Federal Republic of Germany, or West Germany, had international stars like Eberhard Gienger, Willi Jaschek, and Helmut Bantz.

Since its reunification, Germany has produced some medal-winning gymnasts, including Fabian Hambüchen, Philipp Boy, and Marcel Nguyen among the men and Pauline Schäfer, Elizabeth Seitz, Sophie Scheder, and Tabea Alt among the women. The former Soviet/Uzbek gymnast Oksana Chusovitina also competed for Germany from 2006 to 2012, winning two World medals and an Olympic silver on vault.

=== Czechoslovakia ===
The Czechoslovak women's team was the main threat to the dominance of the Soviet women's team for decades. They won team medals at every World Championships and Olympics from 1934 to 1970, with the exceptions of the 1950 Worlds and 1956 Olympics. Among their leaders were Vlasta Děkanová, the first women's World all-around champion, and Věra Čáslavská, who won all five European, World and Olympic all-around titles during the 1964–68 Olympic cycle—a feat never matched by any other gymnast, male or female. Čáslavská also led Czechoslovakia to the world team title in 1966, making the country one of only two (Romania being the other) ever to defeat the Soviet women's team at a major competition. (In fact, the Czechoslovak women's team's participation at the Olympic level stretches all the way back to the first-ever Olympiad at which women's gymnastics was included as a competitive event - the 1928 Amsterdam Olympics - although they did not participate in an officially competitive role.)

The Czechoslovakia men's success at the World Championships was the greatest of any country before World War II: They were first in the medal table more than any other nation and won the most team titles during the pre-WWII period.

Together, Czechoslovakia and its precursor, the Austro-Hungarian constituent Bohemia, produced four men's World all-around champions: Josef Čada in 1907, Ferdinand Steiner in 1911, František Pecháček in 1922, and Jan Gajdoš in 1938. Their most decorated athlete was Ladislav Vácha, who won 10 individual World and Olympic medals.

=== Hungary ===
Led by individuals such as 10-time Olympic medalist (with five golds) Ágnes Keleti, the Hungarian women's team medaled at the first four Olympics that included women's artistic gymnastics competitions (1936–1956), as well as at the 1954 World Championships. After a long decline, World and Olympic vault champion Henrietta Ónodi put them back on the map in the late 1980s and early 1990s.

The Hungarian men never had the same level of success as the women. However, Zoltán Magyar dominated the pommel horse in the 1970s, winning eight of a possible nine European, World, and Olympic titles from 1973 to 1980. Szilveszter Csollány, a World and Olympic champion on rings, also won medals at major competitions for a decade starting in the early 1990s. In more recent years, Krisztián Berki has won World and Olympic titles on the pommel horse.

=== Other nations ===
Several other nations have been strong competitors in WAG and MAG. The rise of various countries' programs in recent years is partly due to the large exodus of coaching talent from the USSR and other former Eastern Bloc countries.

In the past two decades, Australia, Brazil, Great Britain, Canada, France, Italy, the Netherlands, and South Korea have produced World and Olympic medalists and have started winning team medals at continental, World and Olympic competitions. Individual gymnasts from Croatia, Greece, North Korea, Slovenia, Spain, and Ireland have also been successful in major competitions.

== Health consequences ==
=== Physical health ===
Gymnastics sits on many lists of the world's most dangerous sports. Artistic gymnastics carries an inherently high risk of spinal and other injuries, and in extremely rare cases, gymnasts have sustained fatal injuries. Julissa Gomez, an American gymnast, died in 1991 after breaking her neck while vaulting three years earlier. Several other gymnasts have been paralyzed from accidents in training or competition, including Elena Mukhina of the Soviet Union and Sang Lan of China.

=== Mental health ===
The pressure of the sport can make it even more dangerous to athletes. Coaches frequently put pressure on their gymnasts to perform well, which can hinder their visual attention, memory, and ability to focus on the task at hand, in turn negatively affecting performance. Moreover, this pressure often leads to extreme perfectionism in gymnasts, which is correlated with higher rates of anxiety disorders, including general anxiety disorder (GAD) and obsessive compulsive disorder (OCD). During the Tokyo 2020 Olympics, gymnast Simone Biles took a step back from competition to assess her mental health and ensure she was not putting herself at a greater risk of physical injury. Other athletes have expressed their support and called for a greater emphasis on mental health in gymnastics.

== Controversies and abuse ==
Eating disorders are also common, especially in women's gymnastics, in which gymnasts are motivated and sometimes pushed by coaches to maintain a below-normal body weight. The problem gained public attention in the 1990s after the death of Christy Henrich, a U.S. national team member who suffered from anorexia and bulimia.

Abusive coaching and training practices in gymnastics gained widespread attention after Joan Ryan's book Little Girls in Pretty Boxes was published in 1995. USA Gymnastics began investigating several coaches in their program for abuse. In the late 2010s, many individual gymnasts—including former elite competitors from Australia, Britain, and the United States—began to speak out about the abuse they had experienced. This followed several years of allegations of sexual abuse by gymnastics coaches and other authority figures, including the former U.S. team doctor Larry Nassar. In April 2020, Maggie Haney, former coach of Olympian Laurie Hernandez, was suspended for eight years following her allegations of verbal and emotional abuse toward her gymnasts.

During the 1996 Olympics, Kerri Strug injured her foot after her first vault. However, her vault was standing between Team USA and a gold medal. Strug performed her second vault, landing on one foot, and was carried off by her coach, crying in pain. Strug's teammate, Dominique Moceanu also opened up about the abuse she experienced. She said that she competed in the Olympics with a tibial stress fracture. Additionally, she fell on her head during her beam routine and discussed how none of these injuries were properly treated. After being the coordinators for Team USA for nearly three decades in 2016, Bela and Marta Karolyi retired. After allegations that gymnasts were experiencing sexual abuse while training at the Karolyi ranch, it was officially closed in 2018.

Upon investigations of those working closely with Larry Nassar, John Geddert, head coach of the 2012 Women's Olympic Team, was suspended by USA Gymnastics for sexual assault, physical abuse, and human trafficking, and committed suicide shortly after being charged in February 2021. The Federal Bureau of Investigation had heard allegations from gymnasts regarding their sexual abuse as early as 2015 but did not address them until years later when Nassar was sentenced to prison in 2017. At the time of Nassar's court hearing, more than 160 women had spoken up about the abuse they endured. In a Senate hearing from September 2021, the victims and their representatives claimed that Nassar had abused 120 more women from the time the FBI knew about his allegations until the time they took action against him.

== See also ==
- Artistic gymnastics terms named after people
- International Gymnastics Hall of Fame
- List of current female artistic gymnasts
- List of notable artistic gymnasts
- Rhythmic gymnastics
- List of Olympic medalists in gymnastics (men)
- List of Olympic medalists in gymnastics (women)
