= Willi Jaschek =

German gymnast

- Born: 2 September 1940 (age 86) Olomouc, Czechoslovakia
- Height: 1.69 m (5 ft 7 in)

Gymnastics career
- Discipline: Men's artistic gymnastics
- Country represented: West Germany

Willi Jaschek (born 2 September 1940) is a German gymnast. He competed in eight events at the 1968 Summer Olympics.
