= 2013 FIM Motocross World Championship =

International motocross competition

2013 Motocross World Championship

Seasons
- ← 2012 2014 →

The 2013 FIM Motocross World Championship was the 57th F.I.M. Motocross World Championship season. It included 36 races at 18 events including Qatar, Thailand, The Netherlands, Italy, Bulgaria, Portugal, Brazil, Mexico, France, Sweden, Latvia, Finland, Germany, Czech Republic, Belgium and Great Britain.

== 2013 calendar ==
The 2013 calendars of the FIM Motocross World Championships promoted by Youthstream were finalised on 2 March 2013. The MXGP of Mexico, which was scheduled for the 26 May weekend, was cancelled.

| Round | Date | Grand Prix | Location | Race 1 Winner | Race 2 Winner | Round Winner |
MX1
| 1 | 2 March | Qatar | Losail | (Belgium) Clément Desalle | (Italy) Tony Cairoli | (Belgium) Clément Desalle |
| 2 | 10 March | Thailand | Si Racha | (Italy) Tony Cairoli | (Italy) Tony Cairoli | (Italy) Tony Cairoli |
| 3 | 1 April | Netherlands | Valkenswaard | (Italy) Tony Cairoli | (Belgium) Ken De Dycker | (Italy) Tony Cairoli |
| 4 | 14 April | Italy | Arco di Trento | (Italy) Tony Cairoli | (Italy) Tony Cairoli | (Italy) Tony Cairoli |
| 5 | 21 April | Bulgaria | Sevlievo | (France) Gautier Paulin | (Italy) Tony Cairoli | (France) Gautier Paulin |
| 6 | 5 May | Portugal | Águeda | (France) Gautier Paulin | (Italy) Tony Cairoli | (France) Gautier Paulin |
| 7 | 19 May | Brazil | Beto Carrero | (Italy) Tony Cairoli | (Italy) Tony Cairoli | (Italy) Tony Cairoli |
| 8 | 9 June | France | Ernée | (France) Gautier Paulin | (Italy) Tony Cairoli | (Italy) Tony Cairoli |
| 9 | 16 June | Italy | Maggiora | (Belgium) Clément Desalle | (France) Gautier Paulin | (France) Gautier Paulin |
| 10 | 30 June | Sweden | Uddevalla | (Italy) Tony Cairoli | (Italy) Tony Cairoli | (Italy) Tony Cairoli |
| 11 | 7 July | Latvia | Ķegums | (Belgium) Ken De Dycker | (Italy) Tony Cairoli | (Italy) Tony Cairoli |
| 12 | 14 July | Finland | Hyvinkää | (Italy) Tony Cairoli | (Italy) Tony Cairoli | (Italy) Tony Cairoli |
| 13 | 28 July | Germany | Lausitzring | (Belgium) Clément Desalle | (Italy) Tony Cairoli | (Italy) Tony Cairoli |
| 14 | 4 August | Czech Republic | Loket | (Belgium) Clément Desalle | (Belgium) Clément Desalle | (Belgium) Clément Desalle |
| 15 | 18 August | Belgium | Bastogne | (Italy) Tony Cairoli | (Belgium) Clément Desalle | (Belgium) Clément Desalle |
| 16 | 25 August | United Kingdom | Winchester | (Italy) Tony Cairoli | (Belgium) Clément Desalle | (Belgium) Clément Desalle |
| 17 | 8 September | Europe | Lierop | (United Kingdom) Shaun Simpson | (Italy) Tony Cairoli | (United Kingdom) Shaun Simpson |
MX2
| 1 | 2 March | Qatar | Losail | (Netherlands) Jeffrey Herlings | (Netherlands) Jeffrey Herlings | (Netherlands) Jeffrey Herlings |
| 2 | 10 March | Thailand | Si Racha | (Netherlands) Jeffrey Herlings | (Netherlands) Jeffrey Herlings | (Netherlands) Jeffrey Herlings |
| 3 | 1 April | Netherlands | Valkenswaard | (Netherlands) Jeffrey Herlings | (Netherlands) Jeffrey Herlings | (Netherlands) Jeffrey Herlings |
| 4 | 14 April | Italy | Arco di Trento | (Netherlands) Jeffrey Herlings | (Netherlands) Jeffrey Herlings | (Netherlands) Jeffrey Herlings |
| 5 | 21 April | Bulgaria | Sevlievo | (Netherlands) Jeffrey Herlings | (Netherlands) Jeffrey Herlings | (Netherlands) Jeffrey Herlings |
| 6 | 5 May | Portugal | Águeda | (Netherlands) Jeffrey Herlings | (Netherlands) Jeffrey Herlings | (Netherlands) Jeffrey Herlings |
| 7 | 19 May | Brazil | Beto Carrero | (Netherlands) Jeffrey Herlings | (Spain) José Butrón | (Netherlands) Jeffrey Herlings |
| 8 | 9 June | France | Ernée | (Netherlands) Jeffrey Herlings | (Netherlands) Jeffrey Herlings | (Netherlands) Jeffrey Herlings |
| 9 | 16 June | Italy | Maggiora | (Netherlands) Jeffrey Herlings | (Netherlands) Jeffrey Herlings | (Netherlands) Jeffrey Herlings |
| 10 | 30 June | Sweden | Uddevalla | (France) Christophe Charlier | (Netherlands) Jeffrey Herlings | (Netherlands) Jeffrey Herlings |
| 11 | 7 July | Latvia | Ķegums | (Netherlands) Jeffrey Herlings | (Netherlands) Jeffrey Herlings | (Netherlands) Jeffrey Herlings |
| 12 | 14 July | Finland | Hyvinkää | (Netherlands) Jeffrey Herlings | (Netherlands) Jeffrey Herlings | (Netherlands) Jeffrey Herlings |
| 13 | 28 July | Germany | Lausitzring | (Netherlands) Jeffrey Herlings | (Netherlands) Jeffrey Herlings | (Netherlands) Jeffrey Herlings |
| 14 | 4 August | Czech Republic | Loket | (Netherlands) Jeffrey Herlings | (Netherlands) Jeffrey Herlings | (Netherlands) Jeffrey Herlings |
| 15 | 18 August | Belgium | Bastogne | (Australia) Dean Ferris | (Australia) Dean Ferris | (Australia) Dean Ferris |
| 16 | 25 August | United Kingdom | Winchester | (Australia) Dean Ferris | (France) Christophe Charlier | (Netherlands) Glenn Coldenhoff |
| 17 | 8 September | Europe | Lierop | (Netherlands) Jeffrey Herlings | (Netherlands) Jeffrey Herlings | (Netherlands) Jeffrey Herlings |
MX3
| 1 | 1 April | Netherlands | Valkenswaard | (Netherlands) Mike Kras | (Estonia) Gert Krestinov | (Estonia) Gert Krestinov |
| 2 | 5 May | Bulgaria | Troyan | (Austria) Matthias Walkner | (Austria) Matthias Walkner | (Austria) Matthias Walkner |
| 3 | 26 May | Ukraine | Bilhorod | (Austria) Matthias Walkner | (Czech Republic) Martin Michek | (Austria) Matthias Walkner |
| 4 | 2 June | Croatia | Jastrebarsko | Cancelled | | |
| 5 | 9 June | Slovenia | Orehova Vas | (Slovenia) Klemen Gerčar | (Estonia) Gert Krestinov | (Slovenia) Klemen Gerčar |
| 6 | 16 June | Italy | Maggiora | (Czech Republic) Martin Michek | (Austria) Matthias Walkner | (Slovenia) Klemen Gerčar |
| 7 | 21 July | Ukraine | Chernivtsi | (Czech Republic) František Smola | (Czech Republic) Martin Michek | (Czech Republic) Martin Michek |
| 8 | 4 August | Brazil | Macaé City | Cancelled | | |
| 9 | 25 August | United Kingdom | Winchester | (Slovenia) Klemen Gerčar | (United Kingdom) Shane Carless | (Slovenia) Klemen Gerčar |
| 10 | 1 September | Czech Republic | Pacov | (France) Florent Richier | (Austria) Matthias Walkner | (France) Florent Richier |
| 11 | 8 September | Slovakia | Senkvice | (Austria) Matthias Walkner | (France) Florent Richier | (Czech Republic) Frantisek Smola |

== Participants ==
- Riders with red background numbers are defending champions. All riders were announced with numbers on February 11, 2013. The entry list of riders with riders teams announced for the first MXGP of the 2013 FIM MX1 and MX2 World Championships on February 16, 2013.

=== MX1 participants ===
| Team | Constructor | No | Rider | Rounds |
|---|---|---|---|---|
| ICE1 Racing | KTM | 4 | (France) Sébastien Pourcel | 15–16 |
| ICE1 Racing | KTM | 121 | (France) Xavier Boog | 1–5, 8–11 |
| ICE1 Racing | KTM | 388 | (Finland) Ludvig Soderberg | 11–12, 15–17 |
| ICE1 Racing | KTM | 999 | (Portugal) Rui Gonçalves | 1–9, 11–13, 17 |
| Team STR KTM | KTM | 7 | (Spain) Jonathan Barragán | 1–13, 15–17 |
| Team STR KTM | KTM | 81 | (United Kingdom) Jamie Law | 1–2 |
| Team STR KTM | KTM | 91 | (Latvia) Matiss Karro | 3–6, 8–17 |
| Red Bull KTM Factory Racing | KTM | 9 | (Belgium) Ken De Dycker | All |
| Red Bull KTM Factory Racing | KTM | 222 | (Italy) Tony Cairoli | All |
| JK SKS Gebben Yamaha | Yamaha | 11 | (France) Sébastien Pourcel * | |
| JK SKS Gebben Yamaha | Yamaha | 24 | (United Kingdom) Shaun Simpson | 10–17 |
| JK SKS Gebben Yamaha | Yamaha | 61 | (Netherlands) Herjan Brakke | 10–15 |
| Monster Energy Yamaha | Yamaha | 11 | (United Kingdom) Billy MacKenzie | 9 |
| Monster Energy Yamaha | Yamaha | 34 | (Belgium) Joel Roelants | 1–3, 5–9, 11–17 |
| Monster Energy Yamaha | Yamaha | 183 | (France) Steven Frossard | 1–2, 10–11 |
| Honda World Motocross Team | Honda | 12 | (Germany) Maximilian Nagl | 1, 3–13 |
| Honda World Motocross Team | Honda | 777 | (Russia) Evgeny Borbryshev | 1–3, 7–17 |
| Honda Gariboldi | Honda | 19 | (Italy) David Philippaerts | All |
| Kawasaki Racing Team | Kawasaki | 21 | (France) Gautier Paulin | 1–13, 15–17 |
| Kawasaki Racing Team | Kawasaki | 89 | (Belgium) Jeremy van Horebeek | All |
| Rockstar Energy Suzuki World MX1 | Suzuki | 22 | (Belgium) Kevin Strijbos | All |
| Rockstar Energy Suzuki World MX1 | Suzuki | 25 | (Belgium) Clément Desalle | All |
| TM Ricci Racing | TM | 24 | (United Kingdom) Shaun Simpson | 1–9 |
| TM Ricci Racing | TM | 40 | (Estonia) Tanel Leok | 10–17 |
| MOM Carnegie Fuels | Honda | 36 | (United Kingdom) Tony Craig | 16 |
| Marchetti Racing | KTM | 39 | (Italy) Davide Guarneri | 1–13 |
| Route77 Energy Honda | Honda | 40 | (Estonia) Tanel Leok | 1–7 |
| Route77 Energy Honda | Honda | 85 | (United Kingdom) Jason Dougan | 1–2, 4–6 |
| 24MX Honda Racing | Honda | 51 | (Belgium) Jens Getteman | 1–3 |
| 24MX Honda Racing | Honda | 162 | (Slovenia) Klemen Gercar | 11–13 |
| 24MX Honda Racing | Honda | 167 | (Finland) Santtu Tianen | 4, 6, 8–11 |
| 24MX Honda Racing | Honda | 249 | (Denmark) Nikolaj Larsen | 3–4, 10 |
| Sarholz KTM | KTM | 60 | (Germany) Dennis Ullrich | 8–10, 13 |
| Team Pfeil Kawasaki | Kawasaki | 75 | (Belgium) Kevin Wouts | 13 |
| | KTM | 90 | (Belgium) Nick Triest | 15, 17 |
| Latvia Elksni Honda | Honda | 95 | (Latvia) Augusts Justs | 1–6, 10–17 |
| V/D Laar Yamaha | Yamaha | 96 | (Netherlands) Rick Satink | 17 |
| Oakleaf Kawasaki | Kawasaki | 98 | (United Kingdom) Alex Snow | 16 |
| CLS Monster Energy Kawasaki Pro Circuit | Kawasaki | 100 | (United Kingdom) Tommy Searle | All |
| CMP Racewear | Kawasaki | 102 | (United Kingdom) Scott Elderfield | 16 |
| KTM SCOTT RACING | KTM | 103 | (Belgium) Kenny Vandueren | 1–2, 6 |
| KTM SCOTT RACING | KTM | 116 | (Ukraine) Mykola Paschinskyi | 3–4, 8–15, 17 |
| HDI Honda | Honda | 120 | (France) Cedric Soubeyras | 8 |
| Buildbase Honda | Honda | 131 | (France) Nicolas Aubin | 8, 16 |
| 2b Yamaha | Yamaha | 132 | (France) Milko Potisek | 8–9, 13–16 |
| Team bdsl Yamaha | Yamaha | 145 | (France) Loic Leonce | 13 |
| Orion-RS Petrol KTM | KTM | 201 | (Czech Republic) Frantisek Smola | 14 |
| Sturm Racing Team | Kawasaki | 206 | (France) Greg Aranda | 8 |
| Yamaha Motor Deutschland | Yamaha | 215 | (Denmark) Kasper Lynggaard | 6–8 |
| MX Oficina | KTM | 276 | (Portugal) Hugo Santos | 6 |
| Sakhar Racing | KTM | 277 | (Estonia) Lauri Lehtla | 3–6, 11, 13–17 |
| Vulcano | Honda | 407 | (United Kingdom) Adam Chatfield | 7 |
| Team XOffRoad Yamaha | Yamaha | 511 | (Italy) Stefano Dami | 4, 9 |
| Hillinger | KTM | 521 | (Austria) Matthias Walkner | 14 |
| RIGA Motocross Team | Kawasaki | 600 | (Latvia) Davis Ivanovs | 10–11 |
| JE68 KTM | KTM | 641 | (Sweden) Filip Bengtsson | 10 |
| BT Motorsports | Honda | 714 | (Netherlands) Marc De Reuver | 3, 16–17 |
| SR Suzuki | Suzuki | 871 | (France) Fabien Izoird | 8 |
| AKR Racing KTM | KTM | 942 | (Estonia) Juss Laansoo | 12 |
| HM Plant KTM UK | KTM | 997 | (United Kingdom) Nathan Watson | 3 |

Key
Regular Rider
Wildcard Rider
Replacement Rider

=== MX2 participants ===
| Team | Constructor | No | Rider | Rounds |
|---|---|---|---|---|
| Rockstar Energy Suzuki Europe | Suzuki | 14 | (United Kingdom) Max Anstie | All |
| Rockstar Energy Suzuki Europe | Suzuki | 33 | (Belgium) Julien Lieber | 1–4 |
| Rockstar Energy Suzuki Europe | Suzuki | 91 | (Switzerland) Jeremy Seewer | 4, 9, 13, 15 |
| RIGA Motocross Team | Kawasaki | 15 | (Russia) Viacheslav Golovkin | 1–6, 8–12, 15 |
| KTM Silver Action | KTM | 17 | (Spain) José Butrón | All |
| HM Plant KTM UK | KTM | 20 | (United Kingdom) James Dunn | 1–3, 5, 10–14 |
| HM Plant KTM UK | KTM | 44 | (United Kingdom) Elliott Banks-Browne | 1–3, 5–6, 8–17 |
| HM Plant KTM UK | KTM | 997 | (United Kingdom) Nathan Watson | 15–17 |
| Monster Energy Yamaha | Yamaha | 23 | (France) Christophe Charlier | All |
| Monster Energy Yamaha | Yamaha | 111 | (Australia) Dean Ferris | 1–2, 4–17 |
| Monster Energy Yamaha | Yamaha | 119 | (United Kingdom) Mel Pocock | 1–16 |
| Monster Energy Yamaha | Yamaha | 141 | (France) Maxime Desprey | All |
| Wilvo Nestaan JM Racing KTM | KTM | 45 | (United Kingdom) Jake Nicholls | All |
| Wilvo Nestaan JM Racing KTM | KTM | 461 | (France) Romain Febvre | 1–3, 8–17 |
| JTECH ESTA Motorsports Honda | Honda | 59 | (Russia) Alexander Tonkov | 1, 3, 6–15, 17 |
| JTECH ESTA Motorsports Honda | Honda | 136 | (Denmark) Stefan-Kjer Olsen | 1–6, 8–17 |
| Christopher Valente | KTM | 71 | (Switzerland) Christopher Valente | 1 |
| Standing Construct KTM | KTM | 76 | (Austria) Pascal Rauchenecker | 1–5, 8–17 |
| Standing Construct KTM | KTM | 259 | (Netherlands) Glenn Coldenhoff | All |
| Red Bull KTM Factory Racing | KTM | 84 | (Netherlands) Jeffrey Herlings | 1–14, 17 |
| Red Bull KTM Factory Racing | KTM | 837 | (Italy) Alessandro Battig | |
| Red Bull KTM Factory Racing | KTM | 911 | (France) Jordi Tixier | All |
| KTM Scott Racing | KTM | 112 | (Norway) Even Heibye | 3–6, 8, 10–15, 17 |
| KTM Scott Racing | KTM | 172 | (Belgium) Brent Van Doninck | 3, 9, 15 |
| Rockstar BUD Racing Kawasaki | Kawasaki | 122 | (France) Dylan Ferrandis | All |
| Rockstar BUD Racing Kawasaki | Kawasaki | 737 | (France) Valentin Teillet | 1–2, 5 |
| Rockstar BUD Racing Kawasaki | Kawasaki | 817 | (France) Jason Clermont | 6, 8–17 |
| TM Ricci Racing | TM | 128 | (Italy) Ivo Monticelli | All |
| TM Ricci Racing | TM | 321 | (Italy) Samuele Bernardini | 3–4, 9, 14–15 |
| Kemea-Reytec-v/d Laar Yamaha Team | Yamaha | 152 | (Bulgaria) Petar Petrov | All |
| Kemea-Reytec-v/d Laar Yamaha Team | Yamaha | 922 | (Belgium) Kevin Fors | 1–2, 5–6, 8–17 |
| Latvia Elksni Honda | Honda | 195 | (Latvia) Roberts Justs | 1–3, 5–6, 8–12, 14–16 |
| Latvia Elksni Honda | Honda | 495 | (Belgium) Mathias Plessers | 1, 3, 8 |
| CLS Monster Energy Kawasaki Pro Circuit | Kawasaki | 200 | (Switzerland) Arnaud Tonus | 1, 16–17 |
| CLS Monster Energy Kawasaki Pro Circuit | Kawasaki | 300 | (Italy) Alessandro Lupino | All |
| CLS Monster Energy Kawasaki Pro Circuit | Kawasaki | 613 | (United States) James Decotis | 4–9 |
| Honda Gariboldi | Honda | 210 | (Russia) Vsevolod Brylyakov | 3–4, 10–14, 17 |
| Estonian Express Racing Team | KTM | 221 | (Estonia) Priit Rätsep | 3–6, 8–10 |
| Marchetti Racing | KTM | 262 | (Italy) Giacomo Del Segato | 1–6, 8–9, 13–14 |
| Heads and All Threads | Suzuki | 555 | (Republic of Ireland) Graeme Irwin | 3, 16 |
| Evotech Stevens | KTM | 685 | (France) Steven Lenoir | 3, 8, 15–16 |
| Route77 Energy Honda | Honda | 711 | (United Kingdom) James Cottrell | 1–5 |

Key
Regular Rider
Wildcard Rider
Replacement Rider

== Championship standings ==
=== MX1 ===
| Pos | Rider | Bike | QAT (Qatar) | | THA (Thailand) | | NED (Netherlands) | | TRE (Italy) | | BUL (Bulgaria) | | POR (Portugal) | | BRA (Brazil) | | FRA (France) | | ITA (Italy) | | SWE (Sweden) | | LAT (Latvia) | | FIN (Finland) | | GER (Germany) | | Loket (Czech Republic) | | BEL (Belgium) | | GBR (United Kingdom) | | BEN (Benelux) | | Points |
|---|---|---|---|---|---|---|---|---|---|---|---|---|---|---|---|---|---|---|---|---|---|---|---|---|---|---|---|---|---|---|---|---|---|---|---|---|---|
| 1 | (Italy) Cairoli | KTM | 3 | 1 | 1 | 1 | 1 | 2 | 1 | 1 | 4 | 1 | 3 | 1 | 1 | 1 | 2 | 1 | 4 | 2 | 1 | 1 | 2 | 1 | 1 | 1 | 2 | 1 | 4 | 7 | 1 | 2 | 1 | 18 | 4 | 1 | 761 |
| 2 | (Belgium) Desalle | Suzuki | 1 | 2 | 3 | 3 | 8 | 5 | 3 | 8 | 3 | 3 | 2 | 5 | 3 | 3 | 3 | 2 | 1 | Ret | 3 | 3 | 3 | 3 | 2 | 3 | 1 | 2 | 1 | 1 | 2 | 1 | 2 | 1 | 12 | 6 | 671 |
| 3 | (Belgium) De Dycker | KTM | 2 | 7 | 2 | 9 | 3 | 1 | 4 | 2 | 9 | 5 | 7 | 3 | 9 | 4 | 5 | 5 | 2 | 3 | 4 | 2 | 1 | 2 | 3 | 6 | 4 | 3 | 3 | 6 | 6 | 8 | 5 | 6 | 5 | 4 | 607 |
| 4 | (Belgium) Strijbos | Suzuki | 6 | 6 | 7 | 10 | 7 | 3 | 6 | 5 | 2 | 4 | 10 | 9 | 6 | 2 | 11 | 8 | 7 | 7 | 9 | 6 | 6 | 7 | 5 | 2 | 5 | 5 | 2 | 4 | 7 | 4 | 3 | 3 | 2 | 2 | 553 |
| 5 | (France) Paulin | Kawasaki | 4 | 3 | 4 | 2 | 5 | 7 | 2 | 4 | 1 | 2 | 1 | 2 | 4 | 4 | 1 | 4 | 3 | 1 | 7 | 4 | 5 | 4 | 6 | 4 | Ret | DNS | | | 3 | Ret | 9 | 5 | 9 | 7 | 539 |
| 6 | (United Kingdom) Searle | Kawasaki | 7 | 5 | 5 | 4 | 10 | 9 | 5 | 6 | 5 | 8 | 6 | 4 | 8 | 9 | 7 | 3 | 10 | 5 | 6 | 13 | 7 | 6 | 12 | 11 | 3 | 4 | 8 | 5 | 9 | 6 | 6 | 7 | 7 | 8 | 487 |
| 7 | (Belgium) van Horebeek | Kawasaki | 17 | 20 | 15 | 18 | 11 | Ret | 7 | 10 | 7 | 6 | 5 | 6 | 5 | 8 | 4 | 6 | 5 | 4 | 5 | 5 | 4 | 5 | 4 | 5 | 7 | 13 | 19 | 2 | 5 | 5 | Ret | 2 | 6 | 10 | 431 |
| 8 | (Russia) Bobryshev | Honda | 5 | 4 | 18 | 11 | 2 | 4 | | | | | | | 12 | 11 | 12 | 9 | 15 | 11 | Ret | Ret | 8 | Ret | 7 | 8 | 9 | 14 | 5 | 3 | 4 | 3 | 4 | 4 | 3 | 5 | 348 |
| 9 | (United Kingdom) Simpson | TM | 8 | 14 | | 15 | 12 | Ret | 9 | 14 | 12 | 12 | 11 | 10 | 13 | 10 | 13 | Ret | 11 | Ret | | | | | | | | | | | | | | | | | 316 |
| 9 | (United Kingdom) Simpson | Yamaha | | | | | | | | | | | | | | | | | | | 13 | 11 | 13 | 16 | 11 | 14 | 13 | 10 | 10 | 8 | 8 | 10 | 8 | 8 | 1 | 3 | 316 |
| 10 | (Germany) Nagl | Honda | 11 | 16 | | | 6 | 6 | 11 | 3 | 6 | 11 | 4 | 7 | 2 | 6 | 8 | 13 | 6 | 6 | 2 | 10 | 9 | 14 | 9 | 9 | 12 | 12 | | | | | | | | | 314 |
| 11 | (Italy) Philippaerts | Honda | 18 | 9 | 6 | 14 | 9 | Ret | 15 | 15 | 8 | 9 | 8 | 8 | 7 | 17 | 6 | Ret | Ret | DNS | 12 | 9 | 12 | 13 | 13 | Ret | 8 | 6 | 6 | 10 | 12 | 7 | 7 | Ret | 17 | 11 | 296 |
| 12 | (Belgium) Roelants | Yamaha | 15 | 12 | 10 | 7 | 14 | 10 | | | 11 | 13 | 12 | 14 | 10 | 12 | 16 | 14 | Ret | 16 | | | 15 | 9 | 10 | 10 | 6 | 9 | 7 | 11 | 11 | 9 | 15 | 20 | 8 | 18 | 265 |
| 13 | (Portugal) Gonçalves | KTM | 9 | 10 | 8 | 5 | 13 | 8 | 14 | 12 | 15 | 7 | 9 | 11 | 18 | 7 | 10 | 12 | 13 | 17 | | | 11 | 8 | 8 | 7 | Ret | DNS | | | | | | | 13 | 19 | 240 |
| 14 | (Estonia) Leok | Honda | 14 | 13 | 12 | 12 | 4 | 11 | Ret | 13 | 17 | 15 | 13 | 12 | 11 | 19 | | | | | | | | | | | | | | | | | | | | | 232 |
| 14 | (Estonia) Leok | TM | | | | | | | | | | | | | | | | | | | 14 | 12 | 14 | 17 | Ret | 17 | 14 | 15 | 9 | 9 | 10 | 12 | 10 | 9 | 20 | 9 | 232 |
| 15 | (Italy) Guarneri | KTM | 10 | 17 | 11 | 13 | Ret | 13 | 10 | Ret | 10 | 10 | 14 | 13 | Ret | 13 | 9 | 10 | 9 | 8 | 10 | 8 | 10 | 15 | 17 | 16 | Ret | | | | | | | | | | 195 |
| 16 | (Latvia) Karro | KTM | | | | | 18 | 14 | 12 | 11 | 13 | 20 | 20 | | | | 21 | 19 | 12 | 15 | 15 | 14 | 16 | 10 | 14 | 12 | 16 | 7 | 12 | 12 | 15 | 15 | 11 | 10 | 14 | 12 | 187 |
| 17 | (France) Boog | KTM | 13 | 11 | 13 | 6 | 15 | 12 | 8 | 7 | 16 | 19 | | | | | 14 | 7 | 8 | 9 | 11 | 7 | 17 | 12 | | | | | | | | | | | | | 173 |
| 18 | (Spain) Barragan | KTM | 16 | 15 | 14 | 20 | 16 | Ret | 13 | 9 | 14 | 14 | 18 | 15 | 14 | 15 | 17 | Ret | Ret | 12 | 22 | Ret | 18 | 11 | 19 | 13 | 11 | Ret | | | 16 | 14 | 14 | 17 | 18 | Ret | 152 |
| 19 | (Latvia) Justs | Honda | 21 | | 16 | 17 | 17 | 15 | 18 | 17 | 19 | 16 | 16 | 16 | | | | | | | 20 | Ret | 21 | 18 | 20 | 18 | 18 | 16 | 15 | 14 | 19 | 19 | 17 | 13 | 15 | 14 | 101 |
| 20 | (France) Potisek | Yamaha | | | | | | | | | | | | | | | 20 | Ret | 14 | 10 | | | | | | | 10 | 11 | 11 | 20 | 13 | 11 | 13 | 11 | | | 87 |
| 21 | (Netherlands) Brakke | Yamaha | | | | | | | | | | | | | | | | | | | 19 | 19 | 25 | 19 | 16 | 15 | 15 | 8 | 14 | 15 | 17 | 13 | | | | | 61 |
| 22 | (France) Frossard | Yamaha | 12 | 8 | 9 | 8 | | | | | | | | | | | | | | | 8 | Ret | Ret | Ret | | | | | | | | | | | | | 60 |
| 23 | (Germany) Ullrich | KTM | | | | | | | | | | | | | | | 22 | 20 | 17 | 13 | 16 | 15 | | | | | 19 | 17 | | | | | | | | | 30 |
| 24 | (Estonia) Lehtla | KTM | | | | | 22 | 17 | 22 | 22 | 20 | 17 | 19 | 20 | | | | | | | | | 26 | 23 | | | 23 | Ret | 18 | 18 | 21 | 20 | 21 | Ret | 19 | 17 | 25 |
| 25 | (Netherlands) De Reuver | Honda | | | | | 19 | Ret | | | | | | | | | | | | | | | | | | | | | | | | | 20 | 12 | 10 | 20 | 24 |
| 26 | (Ukraine) Paschynskyi | KTM | | | | | Ret | 18 | 19 | 24 | | | | | | | 27 | 24 | 19 | 19 | 26 | 24 | Ret | Ret | 22 | 23 | 22 | 21 | 20 | 19 | 24 | Ret | | | 16 | 16 | 22 |
| 27 | (France) Aubin | Honda | | | | | | | | | | | | | | | 19 | 11 | | | | | | | | | | | | | | | 12 | Ret | | | 21 |
| 28 | (Finland) Soderberg | KTM | | | | | | | | | | | | | | | | | | | | | 23 | 22 | 18 | 21 | | | | | 18 | 16 | 18 | 15 | Ret | | 20 |
| 29 | (United Kingdom) Dougan | Honda | 19 | 19 | Ret | | | | | 16 | 18 | 18 | Ret | 17 | | | | | | | | | | | | | | | | | | | | | | | 19 |
| 30 | (Netherlands) Satink | Yamaha | | | | | | | | | | | | | | | | | | | | | | | | | | | | | | | | | 11 | 13 | 18 |
| 31 | (Denmark) Lynggaard | Yamaha | | | | | | | | | | | 15 | 19 | 17 | 16 | Ret | 23 | | | | | | | | | | | | | | | | | | | 17 |
| 32 | (Denmark) Larsen | Honda | | | | | 21 | 19 | 16 | 18 | | | | | | | | | | | 18 | 17 | | | | | | | | | | | | | | | 17 |
| 33 | (Austria) Walkner | KTM | | | | | | | | | | | | | | | | | | | | | | | | | | | 13 | 13 | | | | | | | 16 |
| 34 | (United Kingdom) MacKenzie | Yamaha | | | | | | | | | | | | | | | | | 16 | 14 | | | | | | | | | | | | | | | | | 12 |
| 35 | (United Kingdom) Chatfield | Honda | | | | | | | | | | | | | 16 | 14 | | | | | | | | | | | | | | | | | | | | | 12 |
| 36 | (France) Aranda | Kawasaki | | | | | | | | | | | | | | | 15 | 15 | | | | | | | | | | | | | | | | | | | 12 |
| 37 | (Slovenia) Gercar | Honda | | | | | | | | | | | | | | | | | | | | | | | 23 | 22 | 20 | 19 | 17 | 16 | | | | | | | 12 |
| 38 | (Finland) Tianen | Honda | | | | | | | 17 | 19 | | | 17 | | | 26 | 21 | 20 | 20 | 24 | Ret | 22 | Ret | | | | | | | | | | | | | | 12 |
| 39 | (Belgium) Triest | KTM | | | | | | | | | | | | | | | | | | | | | | | | | | | | | 20 | 17 | | | Ret | 15 | 11 |
| 40 | (Latvia) Ivanovs | Kawasaki | | | | | | | | | | | | | | | | | | | 17 | 16 | 19 | 24 | | | | | | | | | | | | | 11 |
| 41 | (France) Pourcel | KTM | | | | | | | | | | | | | | | | | | | | | | | | | | | | | 14 | 18 | Ret | Ret | | | 10 |
| 42 | (Brazil) Balbi | Kawasaki | | | | | | | | | | | | | 15 | 18 | | | | | | | | | | | | | | | | | | | | | 9 |
| 43 | (Czech Republic) Smola | KTM | | | | | | | | | | | | | | | | | | | | | | | | | | | 16 | 17 | | | | | | | 9 |
| 44 | (Estonia) Laansoo | KTM | | | | | | | | | | | | | | | | | | | | | | | 15 | 19 | | | | | | | | | | | 8 |
| 45 | (United Kingdom) Craig | KTM | | | | | | | | | | | | | | | | | | | | | | | | | | | | | | | Ret | 14 | | | 7 |
| 46 | (United Kingdom) Elderfield | Kawasaki | | | | | | | | | | | | | | | | | | | | | | | | | | | | | | | 19 | 16 | | | 7 |
| 47 | (Belgium) Wouts | Kawasaki | | | | | | | | | | | | | | | | | | | | | | | | | 17 | 18 | | | | | | | | | 7 |
| 48 | (Italy) Dami | Yamaha | | | | | | | 20 | 25 | | | | | | | | | 18 | 18 | | | | | | | | | | | | | | | | | 7 |
| 49 | (Belgium) Vandueren | KTM | 20 | | | 16 | | | | | | | Ret | | | | | | | | | | | | | | | | | | | | | | | | 6 |
| 50 | (United Kingdom) Watson | KTM | | | | | 20 | 16 | | | | | | | | | | | | | | | | | | | | | | | | | | | | | 6 |
| 51 | (France) Soubeyras | Honda | | | | | | | | | | | | | | | 18 | 18 | | | | | | | | | | | | | | | | | | | 6 |
| 52 | (Belgium) Getteman | Honda | Ret | 18 | 20 | 19 | Ret | | | | | | | | | | | | | | | | | | | | | | | | | | | | | | 6 |
| 53 | (United Kingdom) Snow | Kawasaki | | | | | | | | | | | | | | | | | | | | | | | | | | | | | | | 16 | Ret | | | 5 |
| 54 | (France) Izoird | Suzuki | | | | | | | | | | | | | | | 23 | 16 | | | | | | | | | | | | | | | | | | | 5 |
| 55 | (United Kingdom) Law | KTM | 22 | | 17 | | | | | | | | | | | | | | | | | | | | | | | | | | | | | | | | 4 |
| 56 | (France) Leonce | Yamaha | | | | | | | | | | | | | | | 25 | 17 | | | | | | | | | | | | | | | | | | | 4 |
| 57 | (Sweden) Bengtsson | KTM | | | | | | | | | | | | | | | | | | | 21 | 18 | | | | | | | | | | | | | | | 3 |
| 58 | (Portugal) Santos | KTM | | | | | | | | | | | 21 | 18 | | | | | | | | | | | | | | | | | | | | | | | 3 |
| 59 | (Brazil) Ramos | Kawasaki | | | | | | | | | | | | | 19 | 20 | | | | | | | | | | | | | | | | | | | | | 3 |
| 60 | (Lithuania) Bucas | Honda | | | | | | | | | | | | | | | | | | | 25 | Ret | 20 | Ret | 21 | 20 | Ret | 20 | | | | | | | | | 3 |
| 61 | (Lithuania) Rukstela | KTM | | | | | | | | | | | | | | | | | | | | | | | | | | | | | | | Ret | 19 | | | 2 |
| 62 | (Japan) Ito | Yamaha | | | 19 | DNS | | | | | | | | | | | | | | | | | | | | | | | | | | | | | | | 2 |
| 63 | (Latvia) Steinbergs | KTM | | | | | Ret | 20 | | | | | | | | | | | | | Ret | 22 | 24 | 20 | | | | | | | | | | | | | 2 |
| 64 | (Italy) Ferrari | Honda | | | | | | | 22 | 20 | | | | | | | | | | | | | | | | | | | | | | | | | | | 1 |
| 65 | (Sweden) Lindstrom | KTM | | | | | | | | | | | | | | | | | | | 23 | 20 | | | | | | | | | | | | | | | 1 |
| 66 | (Brazil) Basso | Kawasaki | | | | | | | | | | | | | 20 | DNS | | | | | | | | | | | | | | | | | | | | | 1 |
| | (Italy) Della Mora | Kawasaki | | | | | | | 24 | 23 | | | | | | | | | 21 | 21 | | | | | | | | | | | | | | | | | 0 |
| | (Belgium) Wauters | KTM | | | | | | | | | | | | | | | | | | | | | | | | | | | | | 23 | 21 | | | | | 0 |
| | (Italy) Bertuzzo | Yamaha | | | | | | | Ret | 21 | | | | | | | | | | | | | | | | | | | | | | | | | | | 0 |
| | (Brazil) Pessanha | Honda | | | | | | | | | | | | | 21 | DNS | | | | | | | | | | | | | | | | | | | | | 0 |
| | (Sweden) Andersson | Yamaha | | | | | | | | | | | | | | | | | | | Ret | 21 | | | | | | | | | | | | | | | 0 |
| | (Germany) Brockel | KTM | | | | | | | | | | | | | | | | | | | | | | | | | 21 | Ret | | | | | | | | | 0 |
| | (United States) Alessi | Yamaha | | | | | | | | | | | | | | | | | 23 | 22 | | | | | | | | | | | | | | | | | 0 |
| | (Italy) Cervellone | Kawasaki | | | | | | | | | | | | | | | | | 22 | Ret | | | | | | | | | | | | | | | | | 0 |
| | (Belgium) Seronval | Honda | | | | | | | | | | | | | | | | | | | | | | | | | | | | | 22 | Ret | | | | | 0 |
| | (France) Lefrancois | Suzuki | | | | | | | | | | | | | | | 24 | 22 | | | | | | | | | | | | | | | | | | | 0 |
| | (Italy) Pedri | Honda | | | | | | | 23 | 26 | | | | | | | | | | | | | | | | | | | | | | | | | | | 0 |
| | (Sweden) Johnsson | KTM | | | | | | | | | | | | | | | | | | | 27 | 23 | | | | | | | | | | | | | | | 0 |
| | (Latvia) Livs | Kawasaki | | | | | | | | | | | | | | | | | | | 28 | 25 | 27 | 21 | | | | | | | | | | | | | 0 |
| | (France) Gaudree | Honda | | | | | | | | | | | | | | | Ret | 25 | | | | | | | | | | | | | | | | | | | 0 |
| | (Finland) Eriksson | KTM | | | | | | | | | | | | | | | | | | | | | | | Ret | Ret | | | | | | | | | | | 0 |
| | (Netherlands) Eggens | Yamaha | | | | | Ret | DNS | | | | | | | | | | | | | | | | | | | | | | | | | | | | | 0 |
| | (Portugal) Rodrigues | Honda | | | | | | | | | | | | | Ret | DNS | | | | | | | | | | | | | | | | | | | | | 0 |
| | (Sweden) Sjoberg | Suzuki | | | | | | | | | | | | | | | | | | | Ret | DNS | | | | | | | | | | | | | | | 0 |
| | (Finland) Lehtinen | Kawasaki | | | | | | | | | | | | | | | | | | | | | | | Ret | DNS | | | | | | | | | | | 0 |
| | (Finland) Kovalainen | Honda | | | | | | | | | | | | | | | | | | | | | | | Ret | DNS | | | | | | | | | | | 0 |
| | (Belgium) Dewulf | Yamaha | | | | | | | | | | | | | | | | | | | | | | | | | | | | | Ret | DNS | | | | | 0 |
| | (Belgium) Ghysels | Kawasaki | | | | | | | | | | | | | | | | | | | | | | | | | | | | | | | Ret | DNS | | | 0 |
| Pos | Rider | Bike | QAT (Qatar) | | THA (Thailand) | | NED (Netherlands) | | TRE (Italy) | | BUL (Bulgaria) | | POR (Portugal) | | BRA (Brazil) | | FRA (France) | | ITA (Italy) | | SWE (Sweden) | | LAT (Latvia) | | FIN (Finland) | | GER (Germany) | | Loket (Czech Republic) | | BEL (Belgium) | | GBR (United Kingdom) | | BEN (Benelux) | | Points |

=== MX2 ===
| Pos | Rider | Bike | QAT (Qatar) | | THA (Thailand) | | NED (Netherlands) | | TRE (Italy) | | BUL (Bulgaria) | | POR (Portugal) | | BRA (Brazil) | | FRA (France) | | ITA (Italy) | | SWE (Sweden) | | LAT (Latvia) | | FIN (Finland) | | GER (Germany) | | Loket (Czech Republic) | | BEL (Belgium) | | GBR (United Kingdom) | | BEN (Benelux) | | Points |
|---|---|---|---|---|---|---|---|---|---|---|---|---|---|---|---|---|---|---|---|---|---|---|---|---|---|---|---|---|---|---|---|---|---|---|---|---|---|
| 1 | (Netherlands) Herlings | KTM | 1 | 1 | 1 | 1 | 1 | 1 | 1 | 1 | 1 | 1 | 1 | 1 | 1 | 2 | 1 | 1 | 1 | 1 | 3 | 1 | 1 | 1 | 1 | 1 | 1 | 1 | 1 | 1 | | | | | 1 | 1 | 742 |
| 2 | (France) Tixier | KTM | 7 | 5 | 6 | 9 | 2 | 2 | 2 | 4 | 2 | 2 | 7 | 3 | 4 | 3 | 4 | 9 | 4 | 4 | 4 | 2 | 4 | 2 | 4 | 2 | 3 | 2 | 5 | 5 | 2 | 4 | Ret | 5 | 3 | 4 | 607 |
| 3 | (Spain) Butrón | KTM | 10 | 6 | 4 | 5 | 7 | Ret | 6 | 2 | 4 | 7 | 3 | 6 | 6 | 1 | 5 | 8 | 2 | 5 | 9 | 7 | 2 | 3 | 9 | 4 | 6 | 4 | Ret | 3 | 7 | 3 | 5 | 3 | 15 | 15 | 518 |
| 4 | (France) Charlier | Yamaha | 3 | 8 | 9 | 3 | 15 | DNS | 3 | 5 | 7 | 5 | 4 | 5 | 12 | 4 | 9 | 3 | 5 | 6 | 1 | 3 | 6 | 20 | 8 | 13 | 2 | 21 | 4 | 2 | 3 | 7 | 18 | 1 | 8 | 11 | 490 |
| 5 | (Netherlands) Coldenhoff | KTM | 2 | 7 | 7 | 8 | 5 | 4 | 5 | 6 | 5 | 8 | 13 | 4 | 2 | 12 | 3 | 18 | 9 | 10 | 8 | 12 | 3 | 19 | 2 | Ret | 4 | 3 | 6 | Ret | 8 | 2 | 3 | 4 | Ret | 2 | 472 |
| 6 | (Australia) Ferris | Yamaha | 5 | 2 | 5 | 6 | | | Ret | 3 | 10 | 6 | 6 | 2 | 7 | 5 | Ret | 6 | 7 | 7 | 5 | 6 | 18 | 7 | 3 | 3 | 9 | 5 | 15 | 9 | 1 | 1 | 1 | Ret | 6 | 8 | 463 |
| 7 | (United Kingdom) Nicholls | KTM | 18 | 4 | 19 | 18 | 4 | 3 | 4 | Ret | 6 | 14 | 2 | 18 | 3 | 20 | 6 | 5 | 3 | 8 | 2 | 5 | 5 | 17 | 4 | 19 | 8 | 8 | 9 | 6 | 11 | 6 | 2 | 6 | 11 | 14 | 424 |
| 8 | (Italy) Lupino | Kawasaki | 6 | 11 | 8 | 4 | 20 | 21 | 16 | 7 | 8 | 3 | 21 | 7 | 10 | 7 | Ret | 7 | 6 | 2 | 6 | 4 | 9 | Ret | 18 | 9 | Ret | Ret | 2 | 8 | Ret | 9 | 8 | Ret | Ret | 10 | 330 |
| 9 | (France) Ferrandis | Kawasaki | Ret | DNS | 14 | 10 | 22 | 15 | 8 | 8 | 19 | 9 | 5 | Ret | 8 | 9 | 2 | 2 | 11 | Ret | Ret | 10 | 12 | 6 | Ret | 8 | 7 | Ret | 7 | 7 | Ret | 8 | 4 | 14 | 2 | 3 | 329 |
| 10 | (United Kingdom) Anstie | Suzuki | Ret | 9 | 3 | 16 | 3 | 6 | 7 | 9 | 9 | 4 | 9 | 11 | 14 | 6 | 7 | 14 | 13 | Ret | 12 | 16 | 11 | 18 | 11 | 7 | 4 | 9 | Ret | DNS | 9 | 13 | 17 | 7 | Ret | Ret | 320 |
| 11 | (Bulgaria) Petrov | Yamaha | 11 | 15 | 10 | 12 | 8 | Ret | 9 | 21 | 12 | 11 | 10 | 13 | 13 | 14 | 10 | 11 | 10 | 9 | Ret | 14 | 8 | 4 | 6 | 11 | 10 | 15 | 8 | 10 | Ret | 16 | 20 | 11 | 4 | 5 | 312 |
| 12 | (France) Febvre | KTM | 4 | 3 | 2 | 2 | 21 | 5 | | | | | | | | | Ret | DNS | 16 | 26 | 16 | 9 | 7 | 5 | Ret | 5 | Ret | 7 | 12 | 11 | 5 | 4 | 9 | 2 | 6 | 7 | 296 |
| 13 | (Russia) Tonkov | Honda | 15 | 16 | | | 11 | 8 | | | | | 12 | 8 | 9 | 8 | 8 | 4 | 22 | 3 | 7 | 8 | Ret | DNS | 10 | 6 | 11 | Ret | 3 | 4 | Ret | 10 | | | 7 | 12 | 267 |
| 14 | (United Kingdom) Pocock | Yamaha | 9 | 14 | 15 | 11 | 10 | 9 | 10 | 13 | 11 | Ret | 8 | 9 | 5 | 11 | Ret | 19 | 8 | 16 | 10 | 11 | Ret | 12 | 16 | 14 | 16 | 6 | 13 | 15 | Ret | DNS | 6 | 9 | | | 261 |
| 15 | (Finland) Kullas | KTM | 14 | 17 | 21 | 17 | 19 | 14 | 11 | 17 | 13 | 12 | 11 | 14 | | | 11 | 17 | 19 | 17 | 13 | 15 | 13 | 11 | 7 | 10 | 12 | 11 | 16 | 12 | 14 | 18 | 14 | 12 | 13 | 13 | 224 |
| 16 | (France) Desprey | Yamaha | 13 | 20 | 17 | 19 | 23 | 16 | 15 | 11 | 14 | 18 | 15 | 12 | 11 | 13 | 13 | 12 | Ret | 20 | 14 | 13 | 14 | Ret | 12 | 12 | Ret | 12 | 10 | Ret | 4 | 11 | 12 | 20 | Ret | 9 | 207 |
| 17 | (Austria) Rauchenecker | KTM | 20 | DNS | 13 | 15 | 13 | 10 | 14 | 15 | 15 | 10 | | | | | 15 | 16 | 18 | 12 | 18 | 21 | 20 | 9 | Ret | Ret | Ret | Ret | 19 | 16 | 15 | 14 | 24 | 21 | 10 | 21 | 134 |
| 18 | (Denmark) Kjer Olsen | Honda | 16 | 19 | 11 | 14 | 12 | Ret | 13 | 16 | 17 | 15 | 16 | 20 | | | Ret | 15 | 17 | 15 | 19 | 18 | 16 | 10 | 22 | 22 | 19 | Ret | 18 | 19 | Ret | 22 | 13 | 17 | 18 | 20 | 122 |
| 19 | (United Kingdom) Banks-Browne | KTM | 12 | 13 | Ret | DNS | Ret | 7 | | | 25 | 20 | 20 | 10 | | | 18 | 24 | 14 | 13 | 15 | Ret | Ret | Ret | 20 | | 13 | 13 | Ret | Ret | 13 | 17 | 10 | 10 | Ret | | 119 |
| 20 | (Slovenia) Gajser | KTM | | | | | 17 | 13 | 17 | Ret | Ret | 17 | | | | | | | 20 | 14 | 17 | Ret | 23 | 8 | 14 | 15 | 14 | 10 | 14 | Ret | 6 | Ret | 7 | Ret | | | 112 |
| 21 | (France) Clermont | Kawasaki | | | | | | | | | | | 19 | 15 | | | 16 | 10 | 15 | 11 | 23 | 17 | 10 | 14 | Ret | 21 | Ret | 14 | 11 | 14 | 10 | 12 | Ret | 15 | 22 | 24 | 112 |
| 22 | (Belgium) Fors | Yamaha | 17 | 18 | 18 | 20 | | | | | 18 | 21 | 14 | 16 | | | 12 | 20 | 24 | 27 | Ret | 20 | Ret | 16 | 17 | Ret | 15 | 19 | 22 | 13 | 17 | 19 | 11 | 16 | 9 | 17 | 99 |
| 23 | (Belgium) Lieber | Suzuki | 8 | 10 | 12 | 7 | 6 | Ret | 23 | 12 | | | | | | | | | | | | | | | | | | | | | | | | | | | 71 |
| 24 | (Italy) Monticelli | TM | 19 | | 20 | | 33 | Ret | 19 | 18 | 16 | 13 | 22 | Ret | 16 | 10 | Ret | 22 | Ret | Ret | Ret | 24 | 15 | 15 | 13 | Ret | Ret | Ret | 20 | Ret | 18 | Ret | 22 | 24 | 14 | 18 | 71 |
| 25 | (Norway) Heibye | KTM | | | | | 16 | 12 | 18 | 14 | Ret | 23 | 17 | 17 | | | 14 | 21 | | | 11 | Ret | 17 | Ret | 15 | Ret | 17 | 18 | 21 | 18 | 24 | 28 | | | 19 | Ret | 71 |
| 26 | (Estonia) Rätsep | KTM | | | | | 9 | 11 | 26 | 23 | Ret | 19 | 18 | Ret | | | 17 | 29 | 12 | 18 | 20 | 19 | | | | | | | | | | | | | | | 46 |
| 27 | (Switzerland) Seewer | Suzuki | | | | | | | 12 | 10 | | | | | | | | | Ret | 19 | | | | | | | 18 | 17 | | | 12 | 15 | | | | | 44 |
| 28 | (France) Teillet | Kawasaki | Ret | 12 | 16 | 13 | | | | | 3 | Ret | | | | | | | | | | | | | | | | | | | | | | | | | 42 |
| 29 | (Switzerland) Tonus | Kawasaki | Ret | DNS | | | | | | | | | | | | | | | | | | | | | | | | | | | | | | 8 | 20 | 6 | 29 |
| 30 | (France) Lenoir | KTM | | | | | 26 | 22 | | | | | | | | | Ret | 13 | | | | | | | | | | | | | 16 | 21 | 16 | 13 | | | 26 |
| 31 | (Russia) Brylyakov | Honda | | | | | Ret | 19 | 20 | 19 | | | | | | | | | | | 22 | 23 | 21 | 13 | Ret | 17 | 21 | Ret | 17 | 17 | | | | | Ret | DNS | 25 |
| 32 | (Netherlands) van Berkel | Honda | | | | | | | | | | | | | | | | | | | | | | | | | | | | | | | | | 12 | 16 | 14 |
| 33 | (Latvia) Justs | Honda | 21 | | Ret | | 24 | Ret | | | 20 | 22 | 23 | 19 | | | 19 | 23 | 23 | 21 | 21 | 22 | 19 | 21 | 19 | 16 | | | Ret | Ret | 23 | Ret | 21 | Ret | | | 14 |
| 34 | (United States) Decotis | Kawasaki | | | | | | | 21 | Ret | Ret | 26 | Ret | 21 | 17 | 15 | 20 | Ret | 26 | Ret | | | | | | | | | | | | | | | | | 11 |
| 35 | (Belgium) Van Doninck | KTM | | | | | 14 | Ret | | | | | | | | | | | Ret | Ret | | | | | | | | | | | 19 | 24 | | | | | 9 |
| 36 | (Republic of Ireland) Irwin | Suzuki | | | | | 30 | Ret | | | | | | | | | | | | | | | | | | | | | | | | | 15 | 18 | | | 9 |
| 37 | (Portugal) Alberto | Honda | | | | | | | | | | | | | 15 | 19 | | | | | | | | | | | | | | | | | | | | | 8 |
| 38 | (Brazil) Vilardi | Honda | | | | | | | | | | | | | 18 | 16 | | | | | | | | | | | | | | | | | | | | | 8 |
| 39 | (Netherlands) Klein Kromhof | KTM | | | | | | | | | Ret | 16 | | | | | | | | | | | | | | | | | | | | | | | Ret | 19 | 7 |
| 40 | (United Kingdom) Dunn | KTM | 25 | | Ret | | 27 | 20 | | | 22 | 28 | | | | | | | | | Ret | Ret | 22 | Ret | 23 | Ret | 20 | 16 | Ret | 21 | | | | | | | 7 |
| 41 | (Netherlands) Bogers | KTM | | | | | 18 | 17 | | | | | | | | | | | | | | | | | | | | | | | Ret | 26 | | | | | 7 |
| 42 | (United Kingdom) Watson | KTM | | | | | | | | | | | | | | | | | | | | | | | | | | | | | 22 | 23 | 19 | Ret | 17 | 22 | 6 |
| 43 | (Brazil) Cidade | Yamaha | | | | | | | | | | | | | 19 | 17 | | | | | | | | | | | | | | | | | | | | | 6 |
| 44 | (Netherlands) Hool | KTM | | | | | | | | | | | | | | | | | | | | | | | | | | | | | | | | | 16 | 23 | 5 |
| 45 | (Brazil) Andrade | TM | | | | | | | | | | | | | 20 | 18 | | | | | | | | | | | | | | | | | | | | | 4 |
| 46 | (Estonia) Kahro | Yamaha | | | | | | | | | | | | | | | | | | | | | | | 21 | 18 | | | | | | | | | | | 3 |
| 47 | (Netherlands) De Waal | KTM | | | | | 25 | 18 | | | | | | | | | | | | | | | | | | | | | | | | | | | | | 3 |
| 48 | (United Kingdom) Tombs | Honda | | | | | | | | | | | | | | | 21 | 26 | | | | | | | | | | | | | Ret | 27 | 23 | 19 | | | 2 |
| 49 | (Italy) Bernardini | TM | | | | | 34 | 25 | 28 | Ret | | | | | | | | | Ret | 22 | | | | | | | | | 23 | 20 | 20 | Ret | | | | | 2 |
| 50 | (Belgium) Graulus | KTM | | | | | | | | | | | | | | | | | | | | | | | | | | | | | 21 | 20 | | | | | 1 |
| 51 | (Russia) Golovkin | KTM | 22 | | 22 | | 32 | 24 | 27 | 25 | 24 | Ret | Ret | 22 | | | 23 | 30 | 28 | 24 | Ret | 25 | 24 | Ret | 24 | 20 | | | | | Ret | 25 | | | | | 1 |
| 52 | (New Zealand) Phillips | Honda | | | | | | | | | | | | | | | | | | | 24 | 26 | | | | | 23 | 20 | 24 | 22 | 25 | 31 | | | | | 1 |
| 53 | (France) Paturel | Husqvarna | | | | | | | 24 | 20 | | | | | | | | | | | | | | | | | | | | | | | | | | | 1 |
| | (Italy) Del Segato | KTM | 24 | | 26 | | Ret | 27 | Ret | 24 | 21 | 25 | 24 | Ret | | | 22 | 27 | 27 | 25 | | | | | | | 22 | 22 | 25 | Ret | | | | | | | 0 |
| | (Switzerland) Auberson | KTM | | | | | | | | | | | | | | | | | 21 | Ret | | | | | | | | | | | | | | | | | 0 |
| | (United Kingdom) Houghton | Yamaha | | | | | | | | | | | | | | | | | | | | | | | | | | | | | | | | | 21 | Ret | 0 |
| | (Brazil) Lopes | Yamaha | | | | | | | | | | | | | 21 | | | | | | | | | | | | | | | | | | | | | | 0 |
| | (Germany) Ullrich | KTM | | | | | 29 | Ret | 22 | 22 | | | | | | | | | | | | | | | | | | | | | | | | | | | 0 |
| | (Japan) Yamamoto | Honda | | | 25 | | | | | | | | | | | | | | | | | | | | | | | | | | | | 26 | 22 | | | 0 |
| | (Argentina) Kriger | Yamaha | | | | | | | | | | | | | 22 | | | | | | | | | | | | | | | | | | | | | | 0 |
| | (United Kingdom) Cottrell | Honda | 23 | | 24 | | 31 | 23 | 25 | Ret | 26 | 27 | | | | | | | | | | | | | | | | | | | | | | | | | 0 |
| | (Romania) Cabal | KTM | | | | | | | | | 23 | 24 | | | | | | | | | | | | | | | | | | | | | | | | | 0 |
| | (Italy) Pezzuto | Suzuki | | | | | | | | | | | | | | | | | 25 | 23 | | | | | | | | | | | | | | | | | 0 |
| | (Finland) Oinonen | KTM | | | | | | | | | | | | | | | | | | | | | | | 26 | 23 | | | | | | | | | | | 0 |
| | (Japan) Tomita | Honda | | | 23 | | | | | | | | | | | | | | | | | | | | | | | | | | | | 25 | 23 | | | 0 |
| | (Finland) Heimonen | Suzuki | | | | | | | | | | | | | | | | | | | | | | | 27 | 24 | | | | | | | | | | | 0 |
| | (Belgium) Plessers | Honda | Ret | | | | 35 | | | | | | | | | | 24 | 28 | | | | | | | | | | | | | | | | | | | 0 |
| | (France) Dercourt | Yamaha | | | | | | | | | | | | | | | 25 | 25 | | | | | | | | | | | | | | | | | | | 0 |
| | (Finland) Malin | KTM | | | | | | | | | | | | | | | | | | | | | | | 25 | Ret | | | | | | | | | | | 0 |
| | (France) Lacan | Kawasaki | | | | | 28 | 26 | | | | | | | | | | | | | | | | | | | | | | | | | | | | | 0 |
| | (Italy) Borz | Yamaha | | | | | | | 29 | 26 | | | | | | | | | | | | | | | | | | | | | | | | | | | 0 |
| | (San Marino) Toccaceli | Honda | | | | | | | | | | | | | | | | | | | | | | | | | | | | | 26 | 30 | | | | | 0 |
| | (Italy) Bonini | Kawasaki | | | | | | | | | | | | | | | | | 26 | Ret | | | | | | | | | | | | | | | | | 0 |
| | (Italy) Furlotti | Yamaha | | | | | | | | | | | | | | | | | Ret | 28 | | | | | | | | | | | | | | | | | 0 |
| | (Finland) Metsola | KTM | | | | | | | | | | | | | | | | | | | | | | | 28 | Ret | | | | | | | | | | | 0 |
| | (France) Kappel | Yamaha | | | | | | | | | | | | | | | | | | | | | | | | | | | | | Ret | 29 | | | | | 0 |
| | (Italy) Cervellin | Suzuki | | | | | | | Ret | Ret | | | | | | | | | | | | | | | | | | | | | | | | | | | 0 |
| | (United States) Lieb | Honda | | | | | | | | | | | | | | | | | | | | | | | | | Ret | Ret | | | | | | | | | 0 |
| | (Switzerland) Valente | KTM | Ret | | | | | | | | | | | | | | | | | | | | | | | | | | | | | | | | | | 0 |
| | (Brazil) Assuncao | Kawasaki | | | | | | | | | | | | | Ret | | | | | | | | | | | | | | | | | | | | | | 0 |
| | (Chile) Danke | Kawasaki | | | | | | | | | | | | | Ret | | | | | | | | | | | | | | | | | | | | | | 0 |
| | (Finland) Numminen | Kawasaki | | | | | | | | | | | | | | | | | | | | | | | Ret | | | | | | | | | | | | 0 |
| Pos | Rider | Bike | QAT (Qatar) | | THA (Thailand) | | NED (Netherlands) | | TRE (Italy) | | BUL (Bulgaria) | | POR (Portugal) | | BRA (Brazil) | | FRA (France) | | ITA (Italy) | | SWE (Sweden) | | LAT (Latvia) | | FIN (Finland) | | GER (Germany) | | Loket (Czech Republic) | | BEL (Belgium) | | GBR (United Kingdom) | | BEN (Benelux) | | Points |

=== MX3 ===
| Pos | Rider | Team | Bike | NED (Netherlands) | | BUL (Bulgaria) | | UKR (Ukraine) | | SLO (Slovenia) | | ITA (Italy) | | UKR (Ukraine) | | GBR (United Kingdom) | | CZE (Czech Republic) | | SVK (Slovakia) | | Points |
|---|---|---|---|---|---|---|---|---|---|---|---|---|---|---|---|---|---|---|---|---|---|---|
| 1 | (Slovenia) Klemen Gerčar | UFO Racing MX Team | Honda | 5 | 4 | 2 | 5 | 2 | 4 | 1 | 4 | 2 | 2 | 3 | 2 | 1 | 3 | 3 | 4 | 7 | 6 | 353 |
| 2 | (Czech Republic) Martin Michek | RSC Buksa / Ados Team | KTM | 9 | 11 | 4 | 2 | 5 | 1 | 4 | 3 | 1 | 5 | 2 | 1 | 3 | 2 | 4 | 2 | 2 | 7 | 347 |
| 3 | (Austria) Matthias Walkner | Hillinger MX Racing Team | KTM | 14 | 7 | 1 | 1 | 1 | 2 | 2 | 11 | 5 | 1 | 5 | 5 | 2 | 12 | 17 | 1 | 1 | 8 | 321 |
| 4 | (Estonia) Gert Krestinov | Apico | Kawasaki | 2 | 1 | 18 | 6 | 4 | 3 | 6 | 1 | 7 | 6 | 4 | 6 | 8 | 10 | 8 | 6 | 5 | 4 | 291 |
| 5 | (Czech Republic) František Smola | Orion-RS Petrol | KTM | 16 | 17 | 9 | 10 | Ret | DNS | 3 | 2 | 6 | 4 | 1 | 9 | 7 | 13 | 2 | 5 | 3 | 2 | 246 |
| 6 | (Germany) Christian Brockel | GST Berlin | KTM | Ret | Ret | 7 | 4 | 9 | 5 | 8 | 8 | 4 | 7 | | | 5 | 11 | | | 4 | 3 | 182 |
| 7 | (Czech Republic) Petr Michelec | UFO Racing MX Team | Honda | 24 | 20 | 8 | 8 | 12 | 12 | 15 | 10 | 15 | 12 | 9 | 3 | 17 | 5 | 9 | 15 | 12 | 13 | 164 |
| 8 | (Italy) Pier Filippo Bertuzzo | | Yamaha | Ret | 19 | 5 | 3 | 6 | 9 | 7 | 6 | Ret | Ret | 6 | 10 | 13 | 18 | Ret | 8 | DNS | 5 | 160 |
| 9 | (Czech Republic) Petr Bartoš | Orion-RS Petrol | KTM | 29 | 18 | | | | | 10 | 25 | 9 | 8 | 7 | 4 | 9 | 16 | 6 | 7 | 9 | 10 | 140 |
| 10 | (Finland) Ludvig Söderberg | | Honda | 10 | 9 | 13 | 12 | 7 | 8 | 16 | 16 | 8 | 11 | 10 | 13 | | | | | | | 119 |
| 11 | (Russia) Timur Muratov | GST Berlin Racing | KTM | 8 | 6 | 3 | 9 | 3 | 6 | | | | | | | | | | | | | 95 |
| 12 | (Slovenia) Matevž Irt | | Suzuki | 15 | 10 | | | 8 | 10 | | | | | | | 16 | 8 | 14 | 14 | 6 | Ret | 88 |
| 13 | (Slovakia) Tomáš Šimko | Slovakia MX Profi Team | KTM | 27 | | 6 | 7 | 11 | 13 | | | | | | | | | 12 | Ret | 13 | 15 | 70 |
| 14 | (France) Florent Richier | Sarholz KTM | KTM | | | | | | | | | | | | | | | 1 | 3 | Ret | 1 | 70 |
| 15 | (Poland) Łukasz Lonka | | Honda | 7 | 12 | | | | | 9 | 7 | | | | | | | 13 | Ret | | | 57 |
| 16 | (France) Levy Batista | | KTM | 22 | 22 | | | | | | | | | | | 11 | 19 | 16 | 9 | 10 | 9 | 52 |
| 17 | (Switzerland) Alain Schafer | | Kawasaki | | | | | | | 11 | 13 | 10 | 10 | | | 14 | 21 | | | | | 47 |
| 18 | (Estonia) Ardo Kaurit | | KTM | 23 | Ret | 11 | 11 | 13 | 14 | 26 | 21 | 17 | 14 | | | | | | | | | 46 |
| 19 | (Netherlands) Mike Kras | | Suzuki | 1 | 3 | | | | | | | | | | | | | | | | | 45 |
| 20 | (Czech Republic) Jiří Čepelák | | Yamaha | | | | | | | | | | | | | | | 5 | 11 | 11 | 12 | 45 |
| 21 | (Czech Republic) Václav Kovář | | Kawasaki | | | | | | | | | | | | | 10 | 17 | 15 | 13 | 14 | 14 | 43 |
| 22 | (Czech Republic) Filip Neugebauer | | Kawasaki | 3 | 2 | | | | | | | | | | | | | | | | | 42 |
| 23 | (Finland) Marko Kovalainen | | Yamaha | 17 | 16 | | | | | 12 | 15 | 16 | 15 | | | 15 | 20 | | | | | 42 |
| 24 | (United Kingdom) Shane Carless | Oakleaf | Kawasaki | | | | | | | | | | | | | 6 | 1 | | | | | 40 |
| 25 | (Czech Republic) Petr Smitka | Hulho Racing | Kawasaki | | | | | | | | | 3 | 3 | | | | | | | | | 40 |
| 26 | (Belarus) Evgeni Tyletski | | KTM | | | | | | | | | | | 11 | 8 | | | 21 | 12 | 16 | 21 | 37 |
| 27 | (United Kingdom) Adam Chatfield | Vulcano | Honda | | | | | | | | | | | | | 4 | 4 | | | | | 36 |
| 28 | (Italy) Alessandro Albertoni | | Kawasaki | | | | | | | 13 | 12 | 14 | 9 | | | | | | | | | 36 |
| 29 | (Czech Republic) Martin Žerava | | Suzuki | | | | | | | Ret | 9 | | | | | | | 20 | Ret | 8 | 11 | 36 |
| 30 | (Denmark) Kasper Lynggaard | Yamaha Motors Deutschland | Yamaha | 4 | 5 | | | | | | | | | | | | | | | | | 34 |
| 31 | (Austria) Günter Schmidinger | | Honda | | | | | | | 5 | 5 | | | | | | | | | | | 32 |
| 32 | (Switzerland) Grégory Wicht | | Honda | | | | | | | | | 11 | 16 | | | 12 | 14 | | | | | 31 |
| 33 | (Belgium) Jilani Cambré | | KTM | Ret | | | | 14 | 15 | 23 | 14 | 12 | | | | | | | | | | 29 |
| 34 | (Finland) Santtu Tiainen | | Honda | 6 | 8 | | | | | | | | | | | | | | | | | 28 |
| 35 | (Ukraine) Mykola Paschinskiy | | KTM | | | | | 10 | 7 | | | | | | | | | | | | | 25 |
| 36 | (Croatia) Hrvoje Karas | | Yamaha | | | | | | | 20 | 20 | | | 12 | 7 | | | | | | | 25 |
| 37 | (Ukraine) Andriy Burenko | | Suzuki | | | | | | | | | | | 13 | 11 | | | | | 15 | | 24 |
| 38 | (Czech Republic) Marek Sukup | | KTM | | | | | | | | | | | | | | | 11 | 10 | | | 21 |
| 39 | (Spain) Txomin Arana | | Yamaha | | | | | | | 28 | Ret | 21 | 20 | | | 20 | 6 | 23 | 20 | | 19 | 20 |
| 40 | (Spain) Joan Cros | | Suzuki | 21 | Ret | 10 | 13 | | | | | | | | | | | | | | | 19 |
| 41 | (Austria) Philip Ruf | | KTM | | | | | | | 17 | 18 | 18 | 13 | | | | | | | | | 29 |
| 42 | (Ukraine) Oleksiy Molchanov | | Kawasaki | | | | | 17 | 16 | | | | | 15 | 19 | | | Ret | | | | 17 |
| 43 | (Bulgaria) Nikolay Yovchev | | Honda | | | 12 | 14 | | | | | | | | | | | | | | | 16 |
| 44 | (Estonia) Karel Kutsar | | KTM | 13 | 13 | | | | | | | | | | | | | | | | | 16 |
| 45 | (Ukraine) Dmytro Asmanov | | KTM | 30 | 25 | | | 16 | 11 | | | | | | | | | | | | | 15 |
| 46 | (Netherlands) Stuwey Reijnders | | Honda | 12 | 15 | | | | | | | | | | | | | | | | | 15 |
| 47 | (Ukraine) Roman Morozov | | Yamaha | | | | | | | | | | | 8 | Ret | | | Ret | 19 | | | 15 |
| 48 | (Netherlands) Mike te Beest | | KTM | 28 | 29 | | | | | | | | | | | 21 | 7 | | | | | 14 |
| 49 | (Belarus) Artsiom Kuntsevich | | Honda | | | | | | | | | | | 14 | 14 | | | | | | | 14 |
| 50 | (Czech Republic) Jaromír Romančík | | Suzuki | | | | | | | | | | | | | | | 7 | Ret | | | 14 |
| 51 | (Ukraine) Volodymyr Tarasov | | KTM | | | | | | | | | | | 17 | 12 | | | | | | | 13 |
| 52 | (Romania) George Căbăl | | KTM | | | 14 | 15 | | | | | | | | | | | | | | | 13 |
| 53 | (United Kingdom) Simon Booth | | Suzuki | | | | | | | | | | | | | Ret | 9 | | | | | 12 |
| 54 | (Czech Republic) Michal Kadleček | | Honda | | | | | | | | | | | | | | | 10 | Ret | | | 11 |
| 55 | (United Kingdom) Matthew Moffat | | KTM | 11 | 23 | | | | | | | | | | | | | | | | | 10 |
| 56 | (Russia) Aleksandr Bugreev | | Yamaha | | | | | 15 | 17 | | | | | | | | | | | | | 10 |
| 57 | (Spain) Ramón Brucart | | Yamaha | | | 16 | 16 | | | | | | | | | | | 25 | 22 | | | 10 |
| 58 | (Slovenia) Rok Bekanovič | | Yamaha | | | | | | | 14 | 19 | | | | | | | | | | | 9 |
| 59 | (Bulgaria) Dragomir Dobrev | | KTM | | | 15 | 18 | | | | | | | | | | | | | | | 9 |
| 60 | (Ukraine) Mykola Chen | | Yamaha | | | | | 20 | | | | | | 18 | 16 | | | | | | | 9 |
| 61 | (Italy) Luca Fontanesi | | Yamaha | Ret | 30 | | | | | 24 | 27 | 19 | 17 | | | Ret | | 27 | 23 | 19 | 20 | 9 |
| 62 | (Italy) Alessandro D'Angelo | | Kawasaki | | | | | | | | | 13 | Ret | | | | | | | | | 8 |
| 63 | (United Kingdom) Ashley Wilde | | Honda | | | | | | | | | | | | | 19 | 15 | | | | | 8 |
| 64 | (Bulgaria) Georgi Gochev | | Yamaha | | | 17 | 17 | | | | | | | | | | | | | | | 8 |
| 65 | (Czech Republic) Martin Finěk | | KTM | | | | | | | | | | | | | | | 18 | 16 | | | 8 |
| 66 | (Hungary) Erik Hugyecz | | KTM | | 14 | | | | | | | | | | | | | | | | | 7 |
| 67 | (Slovakia) Jakub Hruška | | Suzuki | | | | | | | 29 | 30 | | | | | | | 26 | 24 | 17 | 18 | 7 |
| 68 | (Ukraine) Oleksandr Matey | | Kawasaki | | | | | | | | | | | Ret | 15 | | | | | | | 6 |
| 69 | (Finland) Riku Rouhiainen | | Yamaha | 26 | 27 | | | | | 19 | 17 | | | | | | | | | | | 6 |
| 70 | (Ukraine) Vladyslav Zalevskyy | | KTM | | | | | | | | | | | 19 | 17 | | | | | | | 6 |
| 71 | (Ukraine) Denis Lytvin | | Yamaha | | | | | 18 | 18 | | | | | | | | | | | | | 6 |
| 72 | (Ukraine) Dmytro Grymaluk | | KTM | | | | | | | | | | | 16 | | | | | | | | 5 |
| 73 | (Czech Republic) David Kosmák | | Yamaha | | | | | | | | | | | | | | | 19 | 18 | | | 5 |
| 74 | (Czech Republic) Michal Votroubek | | KTM | | | | | | | | | | | | | | | Ret | Ret | Ret | 16 | 5 |
| 75 | (Ukraine) Andriy Malaev | | Kawasaki | | | | | | | | | | | 20 | 18 | | | | | | | 4 |
| 76 | (Ukraine) Viacheslav Doskach | | Yamaha | | | | | 19 | 19 | | | | | | | | | | | | | 4 |
| 77 | (Czech Republic) Petr Stloukal | | Yamaha | | | | | | | | | | | | | | | 22 | 17 | | | 4 |
| 78 | (Slovakia) Michal Novocký | | KTM | | | | | | | | | | | | | | | | | | 17 | 4 |
| 79 | (United Kingdom) Jamie Skuse | | Suzuki | | | | | | | | | | | | | 18 | 22 | | | | | 3 |
| 80 | (Switzerland) Kevin Auberson | | KTM | | | | | | | | | Ret | 18 | | | Ret | Ret | | | | | 3 |
| 81 | (Germany) Ron Noffz | | KTM | 18 | 24 | | | | | | | | | | | | | | | | | 3 |
| 82 | (Poland) Arkadiusz Mank | | Honda | | | | | | | 18 | 28 | | | | | | | Ret | | | | 3 |
| 83 | (Italy) Michele Cencioni | | Honda | | | | | | | Ret | 23 | 20 | 19 | | | | | | | | | 3 |
| 84 | (Slovakia) Juraj Popovicz | | Suzuki | | | | | | | | | | | | | | | | | 18 | Ret | 3 |
| 85 | (Romania) Cătălin Virgil | | KTM | | | 19 | 21 | | | | | | | | | | | | | | | 2 |
| 86 | (Austria) Marco Schögler | | KTM | 19 | 21 | | | | | | | | | | | | | | | | | 2 |
| 87 | (Bulgaria) Lubomir Vasev | | Yamaha | | | 22 | 19 | | | | | | | | | | | | | | | 2 |
| 88 | (Serbia) Aleksandar Stanković | | KTM | | | 20 | 20 | | | | | | | | | | | | | | | 2 |
| 89 | (Ukraine) Mykhaylo Moravskyy | | Honda | | | | | | | | | | | 21 | 20 | | | | | | | 1 |
| 90 | (Ukraine) Volodymyr Voloshyn | | Kawasaki | | | | | Ret | 20 | | | | | | | | | | | | | 1 |
| 91 | (Sweden) Mattias Andersson | | Yamaha | 20 | Ret | | | | | | | | | | | | | | | | | 1 |
| 92 | (Slovakia) Radoslav Matula | | Kawasaki | | | | | | | | | | | | | | | | | 20 | 23 | 1 |
| 93 | (Slovenia) Theo Urbas | | Kawasaki | | | | | | | 21 | 22 | | | | | | | | | | | 0 |
| 94 | (Italy) Stefano Barbieri | | Kawasaki | | | | | | | | | 22 | 21 | | | | | | | | | 0 |
| 95 | (Slovakia) Jan Drobec | | Yamaha | | | | | | | | | | | | | | | | | 21 | 22 | 0 |
| 96 | (Romania) Ionut Corbea | | KTM | | | 21 | 23 | | | | | | | | | | | | | | | 0 |
| 97 | (Ukraine) Igor Lubomyrski | | Honda | | | | | 21 | 23 | | | | | | | | | | | | | 0 |
| 98 | (Austria) David Kraus | | KTM | | | | | | | 25 | 26 | | | | | | | 24 | 21 | | | 0 |
| 99 | (Ukraine) Oleksiy Ovcharenko | | Yamaha | | | | | Ret | 21 | | | | | | | | | | | | | 0 |
| 100 | (North Macedonia) Goce Tomovski | | Honda | | | 23 | 22 | | | | | | | | | | | | | | | 0 |
| 101 | (Ukraine) Kyrylo Kuts | | Yamaha | | | | | 22 | 24 | | | | | | | | | | | | | 0 |
| 102 | (Austria) Andreas Schmidinger | | Honda | | | | | | | 22 | 24 | | | | | | | | | | | 0 |
| 103 | (Italy) Danilo Musso | | KTM | | | | | | | | | 24 | 22 | | | | | | | | | 0 |
| 104 | (Slovakia) Tomas Barnosak | | Yamaha | | | | | | | | | | | | | | | | | 22 | 24 | 0 |
| 105 | (Ukraine) Stanislav Ogorodnik | | Suzuki | | | | | Ret | 22 | | | | | | | | | | | | | 0 |
| 106 | (Italy) Gino Silvestri | | Kawasaki | | | | | | | | | 23 | 23 | | | | | | | | | 0 |
| 107 | (Slovakia) Matus Lavo | | Suzuki | | | | | | | | | | | | | | | | | 23 | Ret | 0 |
| 108 | (Slovakia) Pavol Berec | | Suzuki | | | | | | | | | | | | | | | | | 24 | 25 | 0 |
| 109 | (Slovakia) Tomas Valach | | Kawasaki | | | | | | | | | | | | | | | | | 25 | 26 | 0 |
| 110 | (Slovakia) Martin Kohut | | KTM | 25 | 28 | | | | | | | | | | | | | | | | | 0 |
| 111 | (Slovakia) Peter Pipich | | Suzuki | | | | | | | | | | | | | | | | | 26 | 28 | 0 |
| 112 | (Belgium) Arnaud Wauters | | KTM | Ret | 26 | | | | | | | | | | | | | | | | | 0 |
| 113 | (Slovakia) Lubomir Havrila | | Honda | | | | | | | | | | | | | | | | | 27 | 27 | 0 |
| 114 | (Russia) Artem Guryev | | KTM | | | | | | | 27 | 29 | | | | | | | | | | | 0 |
| 115 | (Slovakia) Peter Valyik | | KTM | | | | | | | | | | | | | | | | | 28 | 31 | 0 |
| 116 | (Czech Republic) Lukas Sinkora | | Suzuki | | | | | | | Ret | Ret | | | | | | | 28 | Ret | Ret | | 0 |
| 117 | (Slovakia) Milan Raffaj | | Honda | | | | | | | | | | | | | | | | | 29 | 29 | 0 |
| 118 | (Austria) Manuel Bermanschlager | | Kawasaki | | | | | | | 30 | 31 | | | | | | | | | | | 0 |
| 119 | (Slovakia) Lubomir Maniak | | Suzuki | | | | | | | | | | | | | | | | | Ret | 30 | 0 |
| 120 | (Slovenia) Borut Koscak | | KTM | | | | | | | 31 | Ret | | | | | | | | | | | 0 |
| 121 | (Italy) Riccardo Cencioni | | Honda | | | | | | | 32 | Ret | | | | | | | | | | | 0 |
| 122 | (Zimbabwe) Sean Mitchell | | KTM | Ret | | | | | | Ret | Ret | | | | | | | | | | | 0 |
| 123 | (Netherlands) Michael Hool | | KTM | Ret | Ret | | | | | | | | | | | | | | | | | 0 |
| 124 | (Ukraine) Sergiy Didenko | | Yamaha | | | | | Ret | Ret | | | | | | | | | | | | | 0 |
| 125 | (Ukraine) Eduard Rybynec | | Honda | | | | | | | | | | | Ret | Ret | | | | | | | 0 |
| 126 | (Netherlands) Rene Albers | | KTM | | Ret | | | | | | | | | | | | | | | | | 0 |
| 127 | (Czech Republic) Jan Brabec | | Kawasaki | | | | | | | | | | | | | | | Ret | | | | 0 |
| 128 | (Slovakia) Vladimir Preis | | KTM | | | | | | | | | | | | | | | | | Ret | | 0 |
