= František Bočko =

Slovak gymnast (1941–2025)

- Born: 9 July 1941 Veľké Šenkvice, Slovak Republic
- Died: 18 December 2025 (aged 84)
- Height: 1.64 m (5 ft 5 in)

Gymnastics career
- Discipline: Men's artistic gymnastics
- Country represented: Czechoslovakia

František Bočko (9 July 1941 – 18 December 2025) was a Slovak gymnast. He competed in eight events at the 1968 Summer Olympics.

Bočko died on 18 December 2025, at the age of 84.
