= Thai-Japanese Association School =

- 泰日協会学校 バンコク日本人学校 โรงเรียนสมาคมไทย-ญี่ปุ่น

Location
- 258 Soi 17, Rama 9 Road, Bangkapi Subdistrict, Huai Khwang District, Bangkok 10310, Thailand
- Coordinates: 13°45′39″N 100°35′35″E

Information
- Type: Private school Elementary school Lower secondary (junior high) school
- Established: 22 January 1956
- Faculty: 229
- Grades: 1-9
- Gender: Co-educational
- Enrollment: 2,631
- Education system: Japanese Curriculum
- Language: Japanese
- Website: tjas.ac.th

The Thai Japanese Association School (Japanese: 泰日協会学校 Tai-hi Kyōkai Gakkō or the バンコク日本人学 Bankoku Nihonjin Gakkō meaning "Bangkok Japanese School", Thai: โรงเรียนสมาคมไทย-ญี่ปุ่น, RTGS: Rong Rian Samakhom Thai Yipun) is a Japanese school located in Huai Khwang District, Bangkok on Rama 9 Road. It is sponsored by the Thai-Japanese Association. It is the school with the largest campus in Bangkok, and one of the two Japanese schools in Bangkok. It admits students from junior school Grade 1 (equivalent to the U.S. 1st grade) to middle school Grade 3 (equivalent to the U.S. 9th grade). The school only allows students with a Japanese nationality to study.

At one time the Japanese school, previously in the central city, moved to a suburban area. This caused a reduction in the Japanese children's interactions with Thai society because the children began to spend a large amount of time on school buses.

It is affiliated with the Thai-Japanese Association School Sriracha in Si Racha.

== Student body ==
As of April 2018 the school has a total of 2,631 students and 229 teachers at the Bangkok campus, and 456 students at the Siracha campus.

== See also ==
- Japanese migration to Thailand
- Josuikan Bangkok International School
