= Josuikan Junior and Senior High School =

School in Mihara, Hiroshima Prefecture, Japan

Coordinates: 34.4381°N 133.1410°E

Josuikan Junior and Senior High School (如水館中学校・高等学校 Josuikan Chūgakkō Kōtōgakkō) is a combined private junior and senior high school in Mihara, Hiroshima Prefecture, Japan.

== See also ==
- Josuikan Bangkok International School
