= Josuikan Bangkok International School =

- 如水館バンコク高等部 โรงเรียนนานาชาติโจซูอิกัน กรุงเทพฯ

Location
- 22/53 Moo 13, Suwinthawong Road, Sansaeb Subdistricts, Min Buri District, Bangkok 10510, Thailand
- Coordinates: 13.8150601°N 100.7489643°E

Information
- Type: Private school Senior high school
- Established: 2008
- Closed: 2024
- Grades: 10-12
- Gender: Co-educational
- Education system: Japanese Curriculum
- Language: Japanese
- Website: josuikan-bkk.com

Josuikan Bangkok International School; JBIS (如水館バンコク高等部, Josuikan Bankoku Kōtōbu; Thai: โรงเรียนนานาชาติโจซูอิกัน กรุงเทพฯ, RTGS: Rong Rian Nana Chat Chosuikan Krung Thep) was a Japanese international senior high school in Minburi, Bangkok. It was an overseas branch of a Japanese private school, or a Shiritsu zaigai kyoiku shisetsu (私立在外教育施設).

The school was operated by Josuikan Education Co., Ltd. (ジョスイカン エデュケイション カンパニー Josuikan Edyukeshon Kanpanī).

It closed permanently on 31 March 2024.

== See also ==
- Josuikan Junior and Senior High School
- Japanese migration to Thailand
- Thai-Japanese Association School
- Josuikan Junior and Senior High School
