= Thai-Japanese Association School Sriracha =

- 泰日協会学校シラチャ校 シラチャ日本人学校 โรงเรียนสมาคมไทย-ญี่ปุ่น ศรีราชา

Location
- 312/10 Moo 5, Surasak, Sriracha, Chonburi 20110, THAILAND
- Coordinates: 13.161389°N 100.986389°E

Information
- Type: Private school Elementary school Lower secondary (junior high) school
- Established: 2009
- Grades: 1-9
- Gender: Co-educational
- Enrollment: 456
- Education system: Japanese Curriculum
- Language: Japanese
- Website: tjas.ac.th

Thai-Japanese Association School Sriracha (泰日協会学校シラチャ校, Tai-hi Kyōkai Gakkō Shiracha-kō; or シラチャ日本人学校 Shiracha Nihonjin Gakkō; Thai: โรงเรียนสมาคมไทย-ญี่ปุ่น ศรีราชา, RTGS: Rong Rian Samakhom Thai Yipun Sriracha) is a Japanese international school in Si Racha, Chonburi, Thailand. It is affiliated with the Thai-Japanese Association School in Bangkok. The school began its operations in early 2009 with the enrollment of 89 students. Currently, the school has approximately 456 students.
