= Cerové =

Cerové Malé Šenkvice, Malé Čaníkovce
- Suburb
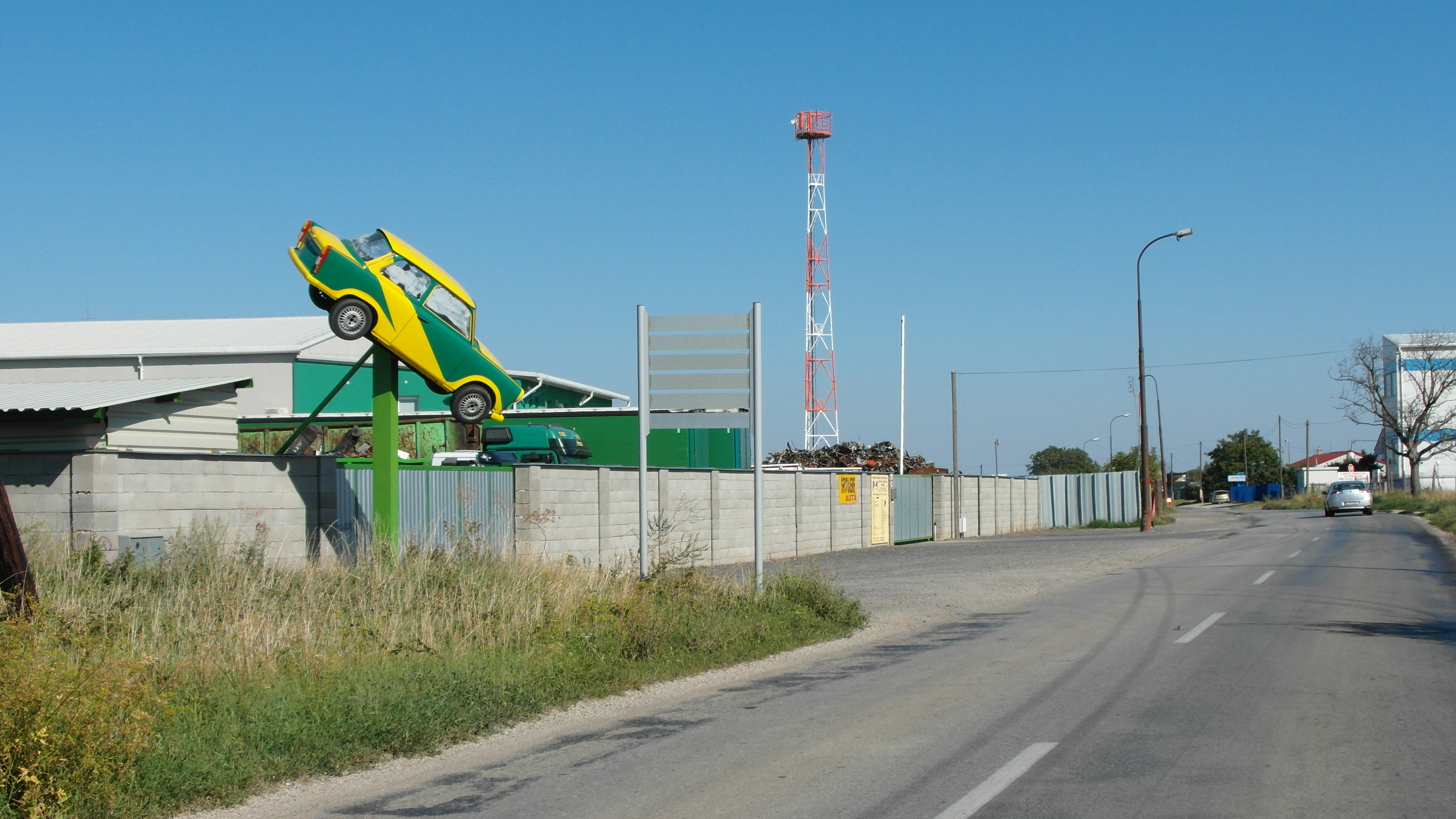
- The P-K junkyard at the end of Cerové towards Blatné

- Location of Cerové in Slovakia
- Coordinates: 48.291269°N 17.363335°E
- Country: Slovakia
- Region: Bratislava
- District: Pezinok
- Minicipality: Šenkvice
- Founded: 1594
- Postal code: 900 81
- Car plate: PK

Cerové, also known as Malé Šenkvice ("Little Šenkvice") or Malé Čaníkovce ("Little Čaníkovce"), is a suburb of Šenkvice, Slovakia, until 1964 an independent village.

== History ==
It was originally an independent village, newly founded by Count István Ilésházy in 1594 as a Croatian refugees settlement. Its oldest known name is Sisek, the later name was Malé Šenkvice. Its inhabitants were peasants who had the same origin as the peasants from (Veľké) Šenkvice ("Big Šenkvice"). They were expelled from Croatia at the same time as the Veľkošenkvičans and settled in the village of Tárnok, and from there Ilésházy relocated them to the new village – Sisek. In 1964, the village was merged with (then) neighboring village Veľké Čaníkovce (Veľké Šenkvice), which gave rise to today's Šenkvice.

== Historical names ==
These historical names are documented:

1601: Sisek; 1773: Kis-Senkvicz, Klein-Schenkwitz, Male Senkwicze; 1786: Klein-Schenkwitz, [Klein]-Schenkowitz, Kisch-Schenkwitz; 1808: Kis-Senkvicz, Klein-Schenkwitz, Cerowé Ssenkwice, Malé [Ssenkwice]; 1863-1907: Kissenkvic; 1913: Kissenkőc; 1920: Cerové [Šenkvice], Malé Šenkvice, 1927-1948: Malé Šenkvice; 1948-1964: Malé Čaníkovce. The name Cerové Brdo was also common but unofficial.
