= Si Racha =

Town in Chonburi, Thailand

Si Racha ศรีราชา
- Town municipality
- Si Racha Town Municipality
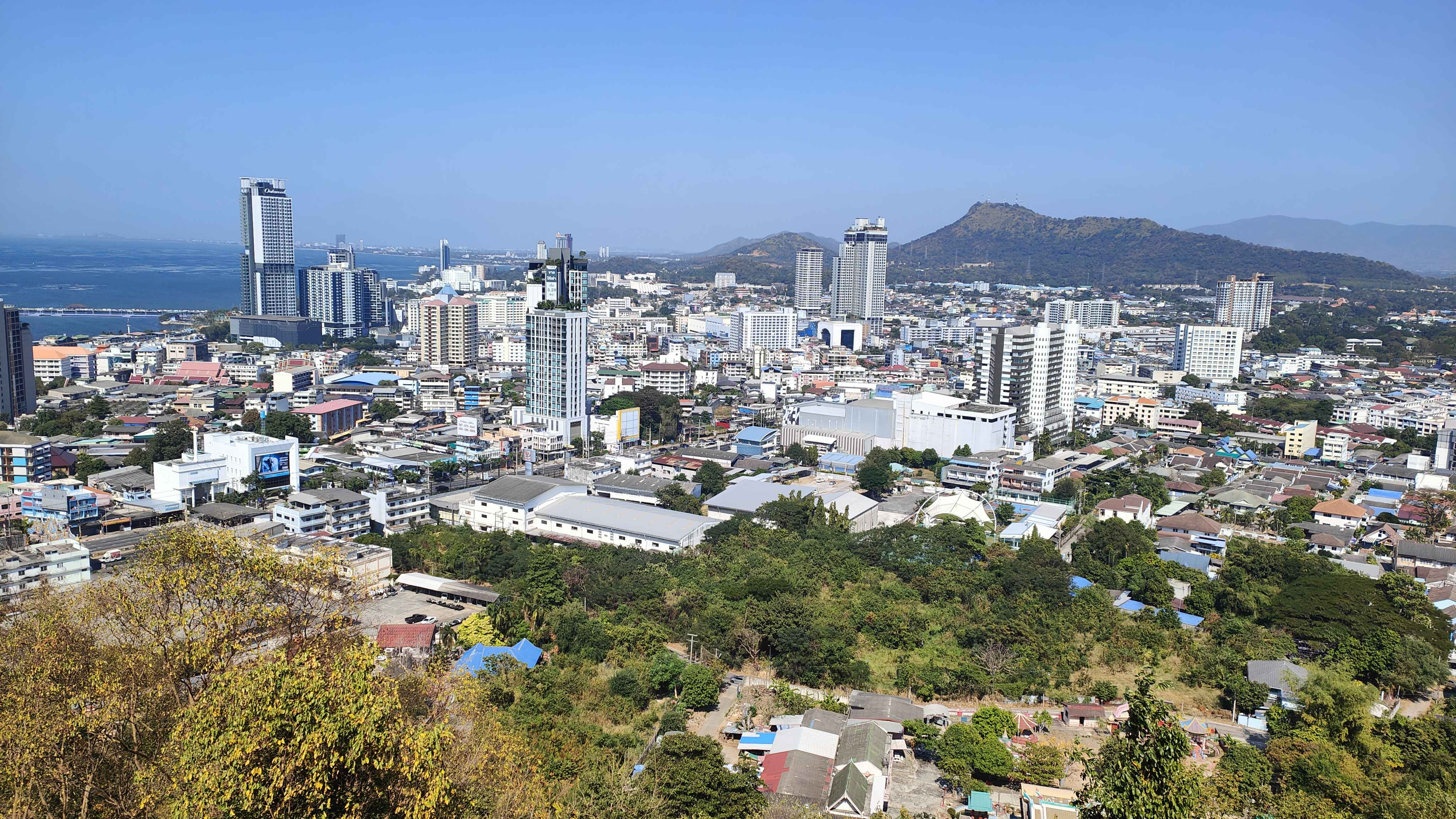
- View of Si Racha town taken from Wat Nong Pa Bua Thong Bangna

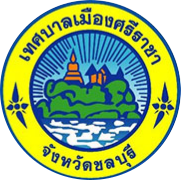
- Seal
- Interactive map of Si Racha
- Location of Si Racha on the Gulf of Thailand
- Coordinates: 13.174°N 100.930°E
- Country: Thailand
- Province: Chonburi
- District: Si Racha district

Government
  - Type: Town municipality
  - Mayor: Chatchai Timkrachang

Area
  - Town municipality: 4.058 km^{2} (1.567 sq mi)
  - Urban: 616.4 km^{2} (238.0 sq mi)

Population (2018)
  - Town municipality: 24,127
  - Density: 5,946/km^{2} (15,400/sq mi)
  - Urban: 327,172
- Registered residents only
- Time zone: UTC+7 (ICT)

Si Racha (Thai: ศรีราชา, pronounced [sǐː rāːt͡ɕʰāː]) is a subdistrict and town in Thailand on the east coast of the Gulf of Thailand, about 120 km (75 mi) southeast of Bangkok in Si Racha district, Chonburi province.

The town is the center of the Si Racha district, the ninth-largest urban city area in Thailand. Si Racha is in the industrial Eastern Seaboard zone, along with Pattaya, Laem Chabang, and Chonburi. It is also part of the Pattaya-Chonburi Metropolitan Area, a conurbation with a population of 999,092 people.

Si Racha is known as the birthplace of the popular hot sauce, Sriracha, which is named after the town.

== History ==
Si Racha used to be part of Bang Lamung district which it borders today to its south. In 1900 (B.E 2443) Field Marshal Chao Phraya Surasak Montri came to the area of the modern town and built a sawmill under his company Sriracha Capital Company Limited. In 1903, Surasak Montri requested that the district capital of Bang Phra district be moved to Si Racha, which it did but retained its original name before becoming Si Racha district in 1917.

The municipality was created as a subdistrict municipality (thesaban tambon) in 1945. In 1995, the subdistrict municipality was upgraded to a town municipality (thesaban mueang).

On 3 September 2023, an oil pipeline being used to fill an oil tanker off a jetty owned by Thai Oil ruptured, causing an oil spill. The spill polluted the Gulf of Thailand with 50-70 m³, producing a 5 km slick. The spill is currently under the authority of the Pollution Control Department and the Marine Department. Thai Oil was later given permission to use 6,000 litres of dispersant on the slick. As of 7 September 2023, the coral off the coast of islands in the gulf have been unaffected by the spill.

Unrelated to the oil spill, on 8 September the waters off Si Racha experienced a plankton bloom caused by recent monsoons that had occurred across the country, causing the beaches up to Bang Saen Beach to be covered by dead marine life, including ponyfishes, crabs, pufferfishes, and tilapias.

== Education ==
The Thai-Japanese Association School Sriracha, a Japanese international school, is in Si Racha. It is an affiliate of the Thai-Japanese Association School in Bangkok. Si Racha formerly housed the Sriracha-Pattaya Japanese Supplement School, a Japanese weekend school.

== See also ==
- Khao Kheow Open Zoo
