= Šenkvice =

Šenkvice Senkőc
- Municipality
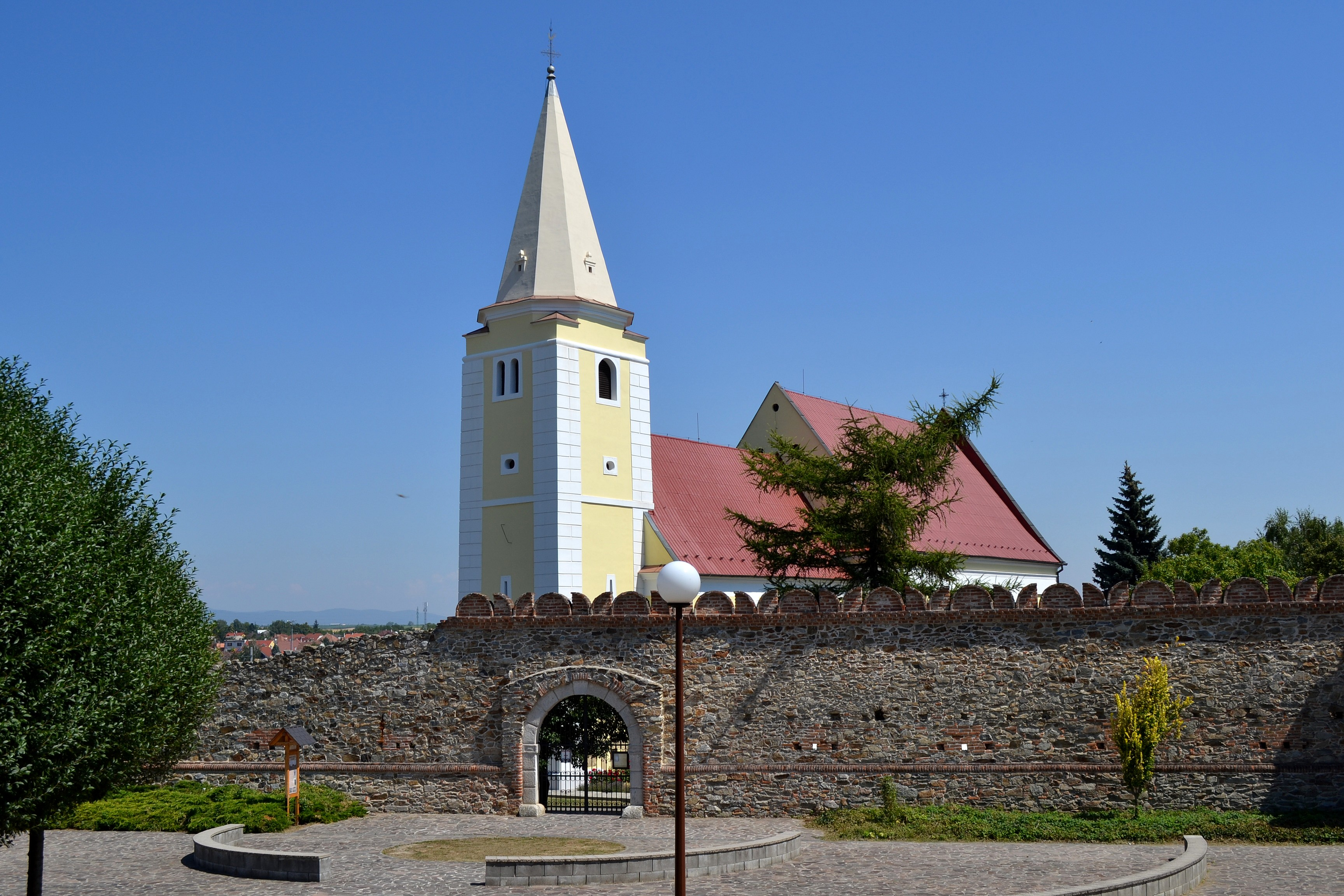
- Church of Saint Anne

- Flag

- Location of Šenkvice in the Bratislava Region Location of Šenkvice in Slovakia
- Coordinates: 48.28°N 17.33°E
- Country: Slovakia
- Region: Bratislava Region
- District: Pezinok District
- First mentioned: 1557

Area
  - Total: 24.80 km^{2} (9.58 sq mi)
- Elevation: 160 m (520 ft)

Population (2025)
  - Total: 5,325
- Time zone: UTC+1 (CET)
  - Summer (DST): UTC+2 (CEST)
- Postal code: 900 23
- Area code: +421 33
- Vehicle registration plate (until 2022): PK
- Website: www.senkvice.eu

Šenkvice (Hungarian: Senkőc) is a village and municipality in central Slovakia in Pezinok District in the Bratislava region. The town of over 5,300 people lies east of Pezinok and south of Modra, and is connected to each via a main road. Another road connects Šenkvice to Blatné, which lies about five kilometers (three miles) south-east.

== Geography ==
The municipality lies at an altitude of 160 metres (520 ft) and covers an area of 24.80 km^{2} (9.58 sq mi) (2025).

== Name and etymology ==
The name derives from a Slavic personal name Čaník (1256, villa Chanuk). The German colonists adopted the Slovak name (probably Čaníkovce) as Sankawych, Sankavich (1390) and finally as Schenkowitz, Schenkwitz. In the 16th century, the village was abandoned and resettled by the Croatians who adopted the German name and changed it to Šenkvice. This became also the Slovak name.

== History ==
Early settlements from the Neolithic and Bronze Age were found in the town, as well as signs of human activity during Ancient Roman times.

The first written record of the village can be found in a letter by the Hungarian king Béla IV from 1256. The town was burned down during the Mongol invasion. Soon, the area was resettled by German settlers. In 1547 the village has experienced an influx of Croatians, who were fleeing from the advancing Ottoman Empire. More Croatians from the town of Hrvatska Kostajnica came in 1594 and founded a small settlement nearby, originally called Malé Šenkvice. Later, it merged into Šenkvice. In 1682, the town has built fortifications around the Church of Saint Anne, where the inhabitants hid during Ottoman incursions.

During the Middle Ages, the village built its first church, roughly in 1350 in Gothic style. The church has burned down and was replaced by a new one in the second half of the 16th century. This church was later expanded and in 1666 rebuilt in Renaissance style with some Baroque elements. The church has retained this look till today.

After the Ottomans were driven off, the town began stagnating. Not even the opening of a railroad line connecting Šenkvice with Pezinok in 1845 has revived the village, and only after the founding of Czechoslovakia in 1918 the town started experiencing growth, thanks to an influx of new companies.

== Economy and infrastructure ==
Šenkvice is best known for its wine production. The largest winemaker in the town is Karpatská Perla, which has received several awards for its wines. In addition, the town has a bakery, Framipek, which supplies stores in from Senec to Pezinok, and a plastic sheeting manufacturer, Novplasta.

The village is fully gasified, and it has water and sewage systems. There is a train station, as well as several bus links to the surrounding cities. Šenkvice has a kindergarten and grade school, a fire station, health center, library and town museum.

== Culture and entertainment ==
The town features a young folk group, Mladosť. It also has a town museum, currently consisting of one room near the Culture House. The Culture House features theatre and musical shows, including performances by the town's volunteer theater group, which celebrated its 100th birthday in 2006.

Šenkvice has a soccer team, which plays in the Slovak league's next-to-lowest fourth division. The town also has a gymnastic team and a field hockey team as well. However, it is most famous for its indoors motocross track.

== Population ==
Population statistic (10 years)
Year	1995	2005	2015	2025
Count	4008	4408	4711	5325
Difference		+9.98%	+6.87%	+13.03%

Population statistic
Year	2024	2025
Count	5338	5325
Difference		−0.24%

It has a population of 5325 people (31 December 2025).

=== Ethnicity ===
Census 2021 (1+ %)
Ethnicity	Number	Fraction
Slovak	5019	95.41%
Not found out	194	3.68%
Total	5260	

In year 2021 was 5260 people by ethnicity 5019 as Slovak, 194 as Not found out, 42 as Czech, 31 as Hungarian, 21 as Other, 12 as Rusyn, 10 as Russian, 6 as German, 5 as Moravian, 4 as Serbian, 4 as Croatian, 3 as Bulgarian, 3 as Albanian, 2 as Italian, 2 as Romani, 1 as Jewish, 1 as Irish, 1 as Ukrainian, 1 as Romanian, 1 as Austrian and 1 as Canadian.

Note on population: The difference values of population numbers in the table "Population statistic" and in the sections "Ethnicity" & "Religion" is caused by the use of various statistical methods.

=== Religion ===
Census 2021 (1+ %)
Religion	Number	Fraction
Roman Catholic Church	3261	62%
None	1461	27.78%
Not found out	228	4.33%
Evangelical Church	150	2.85%
Total	5260	

In year 2021 was 5260 people by religion 3261 from Roman Catholic Church, 1461 from None, 228 from Not found out, 150 from Evangelical Church, 43 from Ad hoc movements, 36 from Greek Catholic Church, 17 from Other, 15 from Eastern Orthodox Church, 14 from Other and not ascertained christian church, 11 from Christian Congregations in Slovakia, 7 from Paganism and natural spirituality, 5 from Calvinist Church, 5 from Buddhism, 2 from Islam, 2 from Apostolic Church, 1 from Old Catholic Church, 1 from United Methodist Church and 1 from Czechoslovak Hussite Church.

As of December 31, 2004, the town had 4327 inhabitants: 2131 male and 2196 female. 98.2% of them were of Slovak ethnicity; the largest minority was Czech. 86.9% were Roman Catholics, 2.2% Lutherans and 8.8% atheists. Of the 1199 houses in the village, 1056 were permanently occupied.

== Famous people ==
- Jozef Figura (*1906 – † 2001), SDB, Roman Catholic priest end Missionary (Japan).
- Anton Figura (*1909 – † 1996), SDB, Roman Catholic priest end Missionary (Cuba, Haiti, Dominican Republic).
