= Blatné =

Blatné Pozsonysárfő
- Municipality
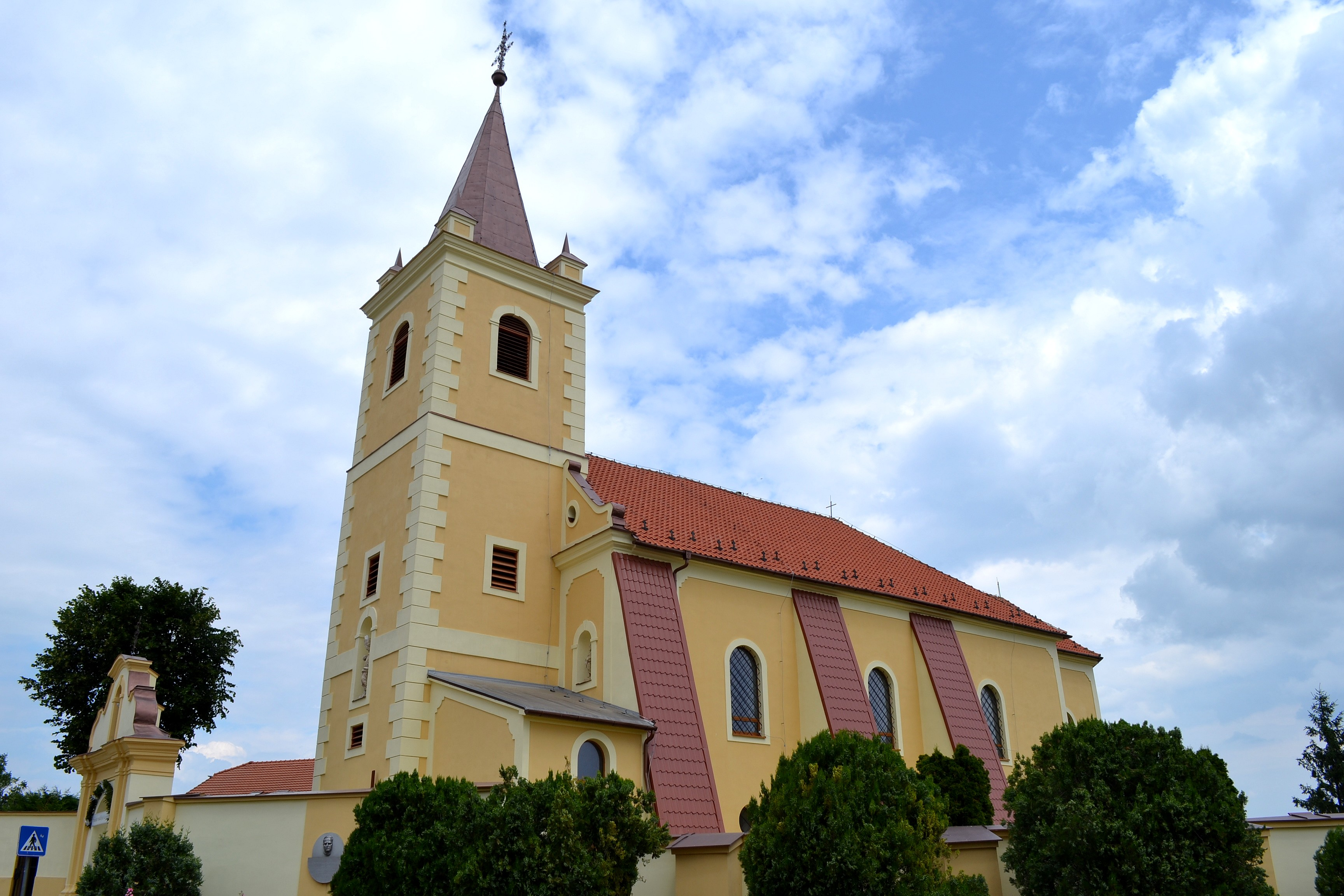
- St. Adalbert's Church

- Flag

- Location of Blatné in the Bratislava Region Location of Blatné in Slovakia
- Coordinates: 48.27°N 17.42°E
- Country: Slovakia
- Region: Bratislava Region
- District: Senec District
- First mentioned: 1245

Government
  - Mayor: Katarína Takáčová

Area
  - Total: 16.32 km^{2} (6.30 sq mi)
- Elevation: 137 m (449 ft)

Population (2025)
  - Total: 1,788
- Time zone: UTC+1 (CET)
  - Summer (DST): UTC+2 (CEST)
- Postal code: 900 82
- Area code: +421 33
- Vehicle registration plate (until 2022): SC
- Website: www.blatne.sk

Blatné (Hungarian: Pozsonysárfő) is a mid-sized village in Senec District in the Bratislava Region of western Slovakia, about 5 km north of Senec. It lies on the fork of roads connecting Senec with Trnava and Senec with Modra and Pezinok. Currently, the village has around 1,500 inhabitants.

== Geography ==
The municipality lies at an altitude of 137 metres (449 ft) and covers an area of 16.32 km^{2} (6.30 sq mi) (2025).

== History ==
The name of the village, Blatné, was derived from the Slovak word for mud, blato. The area around the town has been very flat and muddy, thus the name. Prior to 1948, the village has often been referred to as Šarfia, an approximate Hungarian translation. Even though the current name has been officially established in 1948 and the town has a negligible Hungarian minority, most inhabitants still refer to the village as Šarfia.

Recent archaeological digs found marks of habitation as early as sixth millennium BC. In addition to habitation marks, a burial ground was found. In 2001, another burial ground, this time from Bronze Age, was found.

The first written reference to Blatné was made in the 13th century. In 1390, a Gothic church was built. It survived until today, after an extensive Baroque renovation in the 18th century. The town also boasts a number of religious sculptures, dating from 1736 (John of Nepomuk), 1801 (main cemetery cross), 1801 (Saint Florian) and more.

== Population ==
Population statistic (10 years)
Year	1995	2005	2015	2025
Count	1298	1528	1746	1788
Difference		+17.71%	+14.26%	+2.40%

Population statistic
Year	2024	2025
Count	1808	1788
Difference		−1.10%

It has a population of 1788 people (31 December 2025).

=== Ethnicity ===
Census 2021 (1+%)
Ethnicity	Number	Fraction
Slovak	1684	92.12%
Not found out	121	6.61%
Total	1828	

In year 2021 was 1828 people by ethnicity 1684 as Slovak, 121 as Not found out, 15 as Czech, 13 as Hungarian, 8 as Other, 5 as Romanian, 4 as Rusyn, 3 as Serbian, 3 as German, 2 as Moravian, 2 as French and 1 as Croatian.

Note on population: The difference values of population numbers in the table "Population statistic" and in the sections "Ethnicity" & "Religion" is caused by the use of various statistical methods.

=== Religion ===
Census 2021 (1+%)
Religion	Number	Fraction
Roman Catholic Church	1250	68.38%
None	353	19.31%
Not found out	127	6.95%
Evangelical Church	33	1.81%
Greek Catholic Church	20	1.09%
Total	1828	

In year 2021 was 1828 people by religion 1250 from Roman Catholic Church, 353 from None, 127 from Not found out, 33 from Evangelical Church, 20 from Greek Catholic Church, 9 from Other and not ascertained christian church, 8 from Ad hoc movements, 5 from Other, 4 from Jehovah's Witnesses, 4 from Baptists Church, 2 from Calvinist Church, 2 from Eastern Orthodox Church, 2 from Paganism and natural spirituality, 2 from Christian Congregations in Slovakia, 2 from Islam, 2 from Buddhism, 1 from Hinduism, 1 from United Methodist Church and 1 from Apostolic Church.

== Infrastructure and Industry ==
In the past, Blatné was known for its vineyards. Currently, people grow wine primarily for their own use. The village has several grocery stores and restaurants. In addition, one can find here small firms focusing on car repair, carpentry and the refurbishment of fire extinguishers.

Nearly the entire village has access to water and gas; currently almost a third of the inhabitants is also connected to the town's sewage system, which is still being under construction. The village is preparing 30 plots for new houses, out of which a half is already electrified and has access to water and gas. Blatné also operates a kindergarten and grade school (grades 1 through 8).

== Culture and Entertainment ==
Blatné has a movie theater that operates in summer months (due to lack of heating it is closed in winter). In addition, there is a library and a dance hall. The latter is used for two village-sponsored dances every year. The town is also well known for its folk music group Šarfianka.

The town also features an equestrian course and bowling. A nearby artificial lake is used for water skiing. Blatné's soccer team, Družstevník Blatné, has advanced into the 3rd division of the Slovak soccer league in 2005. Every December 31, the town organizes a cross-country race to the nearest village, Šenkvice, and back.

== See also ==
- List of municipalities and towns in Slovakia

== Genealogical resources ==
The records for genealogical research are available at the state archive "Statny Archiv in Bratislava, Slovakia"

- Roman Catholic church records (births/marriages/deaths): 1850-1923 (parish A)
- Lutheran church records (births/marriages/deaths): 1786-1896 (parish B)
