= Gymnastics at the 1928 Summer Olympics – Men's parallel bars =

Olympic gymnastics event

Men's parallel bars at the Games of the IX Olympiad
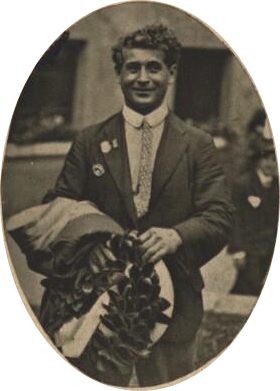
- Ladislav Vácha
- Venue: Olympic Stadium
- Date: 9 August 1928
- Competitors: 85 from 11 nations
- Winning score: 56.50

Medalists
1st place, gold medalist(s)		Ladislav Vácha; Czechoslovakia
2nd place, silver medalist(s)		Josip Primožič; Yugoslavia
3rd place, bronze medalist(s)		Hermann Hänggi; Switzerland

The men's parallel bars event was part of the gymnastics programme at the 1928 Summer Olympics. It was one of seven gymnastics events for men and it was contested for the fourth time after 1896, 1904, and 1924. The competition was held on Thursday, August 9, 1928. Eighty-five gymnasts from eleven nations competed, with each nation having a team of up to 8 gymnasts. The event was won by Ladislav Vácha of Czechoslovakia, the nation's first victory in the men's parallel bars. The silver medal went to Josip Primožič of Yugoslavia, with Hermann Hänggi of Switzerland earning bronze.

== Background ==
This was the fourth appearance of the event, which is one of the five apparatus events held every time there were apparatus events at the Summer Olympics (no apparatus events were held in 1900, 1908, 1912, or 1920). Four of the top 10 gymnasts from 1924 returned: gold medalist August Güttinger of Switzerland, fifth-place finisher Mario Lertora of Italy, sixth-place finisher Ladislav Vácha of Czechoslovakia, and eighth-place finisher Bedřich Šupčík of Czechoslovakia. Vácha had won the 1926 world championship as well, and was favored going into the competition.

The Netherlands made its debut in the men's parallel bars. Hungary competed for the first time since 1896. The other nine nations had all competed in 1924. France, Switzerland, and the United States each made their third appearance, tied for most of any nation.

== Competition format ==
Each gymnast performed a compulsory exercise and a voluntary exercise. The maximum score for each exercise was 30 points. The parallel bars was one of the apparatus used in the individual and team all-around scores. It accounted for 2/9 of the score.

== Schedule ==
Date	Time	Round
Thursday, 9 August 1928		Final

== Results ==
Rank	Gymnast	Nation	Total
1st place, gold medalist(s)	Ladislav Vácha	Czechoslovakia	56.50
2nd place, silver medalist(s)	Josip Primožič	Yugoslavia	55.50
3rd place, bronze medalist(s)	Hermann Hänggi	Switzerland	54.25
4	Jan Gajdoš	Czechoslovakia	53.75
4	Bedřich Šupčík	Czechoslovakia	53.75
4	André Lemoine	France	53.75
7	Mauri Nyberg-Noroma	Finland	53.50
7	Leon Štukelj	Yugoslavia	53.50
7	Melchior Wezel	Switzerland	53.50
7	Mario Lertora	Italy	53.50
11	Hans Grieder	Switzerland	53.25
12	Romeo Neri	Italy	53.00
12	Armand Solbach	France	53.00
14	Emanuel Löffler	Czechoslovakia	52.50
15	Josef Effenberger	Czechoslovakia	52.25
15	Georges Leroux	France	52.25
17	Heikki Savolainen	Finland	51.75
17	István Pelle	Hungary	51.75
19	Anton Malej	Yugoslavia	51.25
19	Edi Steinemann	Switzerland	51.25
21	Jan Koutný	Czechoslovakia	51.00
21	Eugen Mack	Switzerland	51.00
21	Martti Uosikkinen	Finland	51.00
24	Ladislav Tikal	Czechoslovakia	50.50
25	Janez Porenta	Yugoslavia	50.25
25	Václav Veselý	Czechoslovakia	50.25
25	Al Jochim	United States	50.25
28	Otto Pfister	Switzerland	50.00
28	August Güttinger	Switzerland	50.00
30	Vittorio Lucchetti	Italy	49.75
30	Georges Miez	Switzerland	49.75
32	Jaakko Kunnas	Finland	49.50
33	Rezső Kende	Hungary	49.00
34	Giuseppe Lupi	Italy	48.50
34	Boris Gregorka	Yugoslavia	48.50
36	Jean Larrouy	France	48.25
37	Mathias Logelin	Luxembourg	48.00
38	Edvard Antonijevič	Yugoslavia	47.50
39	John Pearson	United States	47.00
40	Urho Korhonen	Finland	46.75
41	Étienne Schmitt	France	46.50
41	Frank Haubold	United States	46.50
41	Glenn Berry	United States	46.50
44	Stane Derganc	Yugoslavia	46.25
45	Ferdinando Mandrini	Italy	46.00
46	Herman Witzig	United States	45.25
47	Dragutin Cioti	Yugoslavia	44.75
48	Frank Kriz	United States	44.50
49	Birger Stenman	Finland	43.75
49	Kalervo Kinos	Finland	43.75
51	Jean Gounot	France	42.75
51	Pieter van Dam	Netherlands	42.75
53	József Szalai	Hungary	42.50
53	Géza Tóth	Hungary	42.50
55	André Chatelain	France	42.00
55	Mozes Jacobs	Netherlands	42.00
57	Harold Newhart	United States	41.75
58	Mario Tambini	Italy	41.50
59	Fränz Zouang	Luxembourg	40.25
60	Nic Roeser	Luxembourg	40.00
61	Willibrordus Pouw	Netherlands	39.25
62	Paul Krempel	United States	39.00
63	Arthur Whitford	Great Britain	38.50
64	Mathias Erang	Luxembourg	38.25
64	Elias Melkman	Netherlands	38.25
66	Klaas Boot	Netherlands	37.25
67	Albert Neumann	Luxembourg	36.25
68	Edouard Grethen	Luxembourg	36.00
68	Jean-Pierre Urbing	Luxembourg	36.00
70	Elemér Pászti	Hungary	35.75
71	Israel Wijnschenk	Netherlands	34.75
72	Josy Staudt	Luxembourg	34.25
72	Gyula Kunszt	Hungary	34.25
74	Rafael Ylönen	Finland	34.00
75	Ezio Roselli	Italy	33.75
76	Giuseppe Paris	Italy	32.75
77	T. B. Parkinson	Great Britain	32.50
78	Jacobus van der Vinden	Netherlands	31.50
79	Bart Cronin	Great Britain	30.50
80	Henry Finchett	Great Britain	29.75
81	E. A. Walton	Great Britain	28.50
82	G. C. Raynes	Great Britain	27.25
83	E. W. Warren	Great Britain	22.75
84	Hugo Licher	Netherlands	21.50
85	Miklós Péter	Hungary	11.00
