= Gymnastics at the 1928 Summer Olympics – Men's rings =

Olympic gymnastics event

Men's rings at the Games of the IX Olympiad
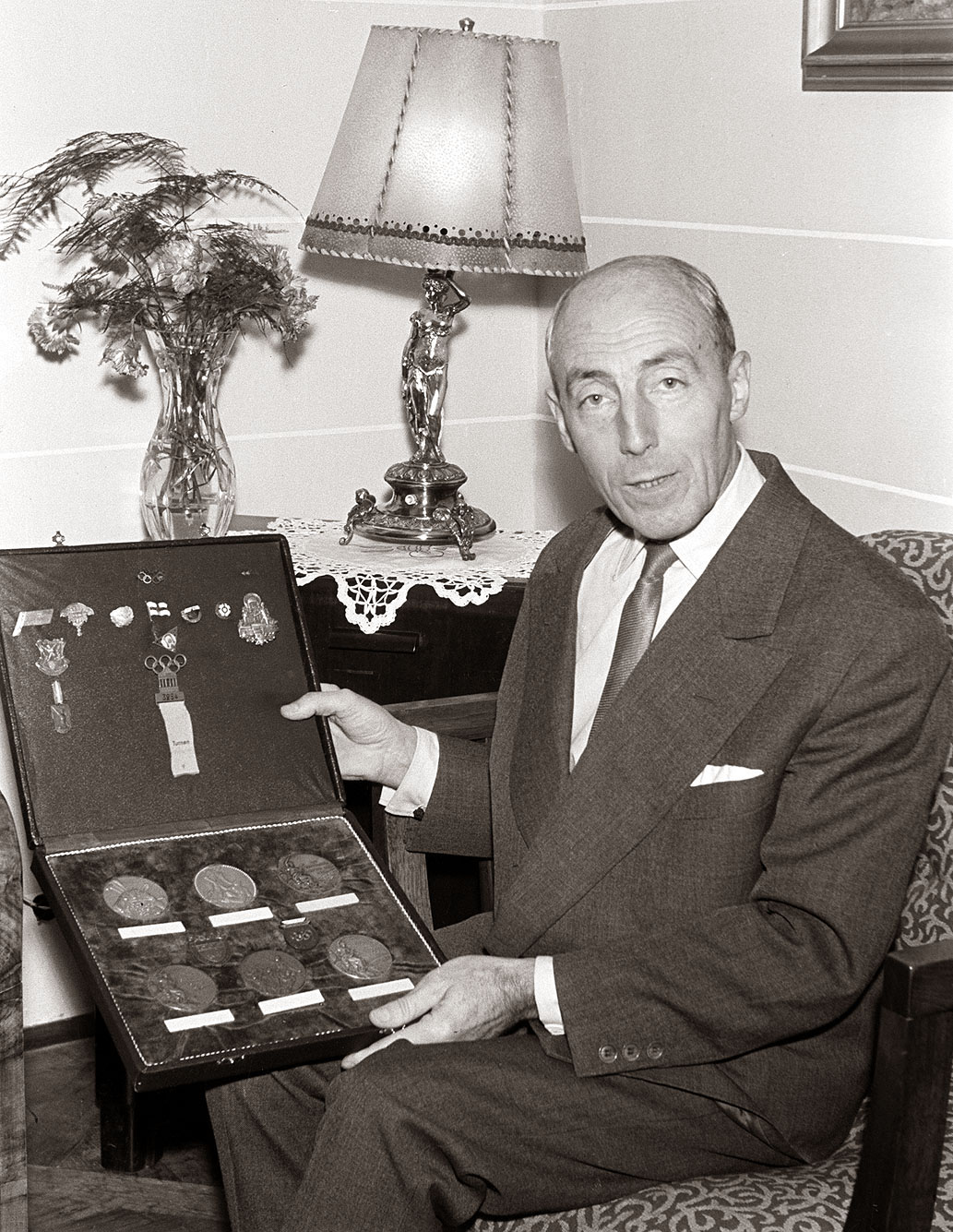
- Leon Štukelj (1958)
- Venue: Olympic Stadium
- Date: 8 August 1928
- Competitors: 88 from 11 nations
- Winning score: 57.75

Medalists
1st place, gold medalist(s)		Leon Štukelj; Yugoslavia
2nd place, silver medalist(s)		Ladislav Vácha; Czechoslovakia
3rd place, bronze medalist(s)		Emanuel Löffler; Czechoslovakia

The men's rings event was part of the gymnastics programme at the 1928 Summer Olympics. It was one of seven gymnastics events for men, and it was contested for the fourth time after 1896, 1904, and 1924. Scores from the rings event were added to the results from other individual apparatus events to give aggregate scores for the individual and team all-around events. Eighty-eight gymnasts from eleven nations competed, with each nation having a team of 8 gymnasts. The event was won by Leon Štukelj of Yugoslavia, the nation's first medal in the rings event. For the second consecutive Games, Czechoslovak gymnasts took both silver and bronze: Ladislav Vácha finished second and Emanuel Löffler is credited with a third-place finish. Vácha, the bronze medalist in 1924, was the first man to win multiple medals in the event.

== Bronze Medal Computations ==
Löffler's bronze medal may be the result of a math error. His scores in the compulsory and voluntary exercises were 27.25 and 28.25, respectively, which would result in a total score of 55.50. This score is consistent with the individual all-around and team all-around scores for Löffler and Czechoslovakia. However, his total score is listed as 56.50 instead in the Official Report for the rings apparatus. A score of 55.50 would have placed Löffler fourth in the rings, behind Italy's Romeo Neri at 56.00.

== Background ==
This was the fourth appearance of the event, which is one of the five apparatus events held every time there were apparatus events at the Summer Olympics (no apparatus events were held in 1900, 1908, 1912, or 1920). Six of the top 10 gymnasts from 1924 returned: bronze medalist Ladislav Vácha of Czechoslovakia, fourth-place finisher Leon Štukelj of Yugoslavia, fifth-place finisher Bedřich Šupčík of Czechoslovakia, seventh-place finisher Jan Koutný of Czechoslovakia, eighth-place finisher Ferdinando Mandrini of Italy, and ninth-place finisher Vittorio Lucchetti of Italy. The 1926 world championship podium had Štukelj (who had also won in 1922), Vácha, and Šupčík atop it, in that order.

The Netherlands made its debut in the men's rings. Hungary competed for the first time since 1896. The other nine nations had all competed in 1924. The United States made its third appearance, more than any other nation.

== Competition format ==
Each gymnast performed a compulsory exercise and a voluntary exercise. The maximum score for each exercise was 30 points. The rings were one of the apparatuses used in the individual and team all-around scores. It accounted for 2/9 of the score.

== Schedule ==
Date	Time	Round
Wednesday, 8 August 1928		Final

== Results ==
Source: Official results; De Wael

Rank	Gymnast	Nation	Score
1st place, gold medalist(s)	Leon Štukelj	Yugoslavia	57.75
2nd place, silver medalist(s)	Ladislav Vácha	Czechoslovakia	57.50
3rd place, bronze medalist(s)	Emanuel Löffler	Czechoslovakia	56.50
4	Romeo Neri	Italy	56.00
5	Mauri Nyberg-Noroma	Finland	55.00
6	Bedřich Šupčík	Czechoslovakia	54.75
7	Paul Krempel	United States	54.50
8	Jan Gajdoš	Czechoslovakia	54.25
8	Georges Miez	Switzerland	54.25
8	Armand Solbach	France	54.25
11	Edvard Antonijevič	Yugoslavia	54.00
12	Heikki Savolainen	Finland	53.75
13	Janez Porenta	Yugoslavia	53.25
14	Vittorio Lucchetti	Italy	53.00
15	Al Jochim	United States	52.75
15	Anton Malej	Yugoslavia	52.75
15	Václav Veselý	Czechoslovakia	52.75
18	Jan Koutný	Czechoslovakia	52.50
18	Eugen Mack	Switzerland	52.50
18	Josip Primožič	Yugoslavia	52.50
18	Martti Uosikkinen	Finland	52.50
22	Josef Effenberger	Czechoslovakia	52.00
23	Melchior Wezel	Switzerland	51.75
24	Mario Lertora	Italy	51.50
25	Alfred Krauss	France	51.25
26	André Lemoine	France	50.75
26	Edi Steinemann	Switzerland	50.75
28	Giuseppe Lupi	Italy	50.50
28	Ezio Roselli	Italy	50.50
30	Giuseppe Paris	Italy	50.25
30	István Pelle	Hungary	50.25
32	Jaakko Kunnas	Finland	50.00
33	Antoine Chatelaine	France	49.75
33	Urho Korhonen	Finland	49.75
33	Ferdinando Mandrini	Italy	49.75
36	Hermann Hänggi	Switzerland	49.50
37	Dragutin Cioti	Yugoslavia	49.25
37	Boris Gregorka	Yugoslavia	49.25
39	Rezső Kende	Hungary	49.00
39	Stane Derganc	Yugoslavia	49.00
41	Elias Melkman	Netherlands	48.75
41	Étienne Schmitt	France	48.75
41	Ladislav Tikal	Czechoslovakia	48.75
44	August Güttinger	Switzerland	48.50
44	Mario Tambini	Italy	48.50
46	Jean Larrouy	France	48.00
47	Glenn Berry	United States	47.75
47	Jean Gounot	France	47.75
49	Hans Grieder	Switzerland	47.50
49	Georges Leroux	France	47.50
49	Nic Roeser	Luxembourg	47.50
52	Otto Pfister	Switzerland	47.25
53	Mathias Logelin	Luxembourg	47.00
54	Fränz Zouang	Luxembourg	46.75
55	Mozes Jacobs	Netherlands	46.00
56	Rafael Ylönen	Finland	45.00
57	Miklós Péter	Hungary	44.75
58	Frank Haubold	United States	44.50
58	Josy Staudt	Luxembourg	44.50
60	Birger Stenman	Finland	43.00
61	Herman Witzig	United States	42.75
62	Kalervo Kinos	Finland	42.50
62	Gyula Kunszt	Hungary	42.50
62	Harold Newhart	United States	42.50
65	Edouard Grethen	Luxembourg	42.25
66	Jean-Pierre Urbing	Luxembourg	41.75
67	Arthur Whitford	Great Britain	41.50
68	John Pearson	United States	41.25
69	Mathias Erang	Luxembourg	40.25
70	Elemér Pászti	Hungary	40.00
70	Willibrordus Pouw	Netherlands	40.00
72	Albert Neumann	Luxembourg	39.75
72	Israel Wijnschenk	Netherlands	39.75
74	Bart Cronin	Great Britain	39.25
74	Frank Kriz	United States	39.25
76	József Szalai	Hungary	39.00
77	Pieter van Dam	Netherlands	38.25
77	E. W. Warren	Great Britain	38.25
79	Jacobus van der Vinden	Netherlands	37.25
80	Géza Tóth	Hungary	36.25
81	Klaas Boot	Netherlands	36.00
82	E. A. Walton	Great Britain	35.50
83	T. B. Parkinson	Great Britain	34.50
84	Henry Finchett	Great Britain	34.25
85	Samuel Humphreys	Great Britain	33.75
86	Hugo Licher	Netherlands	32.75
87	G. C. Raynes	Great Britain	31.25
—	Imre Erdődy	Hungary	DNF
