= Gymnastics at the 1928 Summer Olympics – Men's vault =

Gymnastics at the Olympics

Men's vault at the Games of the IX Olympiad
- Artistic gymnastics pictogram
- Venue: Olympic Stadium
- Date: 10 August 1928
- Competitors: 85 from 11 nations
- Winning score: 28.750

Medalists
1st place, gold medalist(s)		Eugen Mack; Switzerland
2nd place, silver medalist(s)		Emanuel Löffler; Czechoslovakia
3rd place, bronze medalist(s)		Stane Derganc; Yugoslavia

The men's vault (or "jumps") event was part of the gymnastics programme at the 1928 Summer Olympics held in Amsterdam. It was one of seven gymnastics events for men and it was contested for the fourth time after 1896, 1904, and 1924. Scores from the vault event were added to the results from other individual apparatus events to give aggregate scores for the individual and team all-around events. There were 85 competitors from 11 nations. Each nation had a team of 8 gymnasts; three of the 88 men did not start. The event was won by Eugen Mack of Switzerland, the nation's first victory in the event and first medal since 1896. Emanuel Löffler gave Czechoslovakia its second consecutive silver medal. Stane Derganc's bronze was Yugoslavia's first medal in the event.

== Background ==
This was the fourth appearance of the event, which is one of the five apparatus events held every time there were apparatus events at the Summer Olympics (no apparatus events were held in 1900, 1908, 1912, or 1920). Six of the top 10 gymnasts from 1924 returned: gold medalist Frank Kriz of the United States, silver medalist Jan Koutný of Czechoslovakia, fourth-place finisher Leon Štukelj of Yugoslavia, sixth-place finisher Janez Porenta of Yugoslavia, seventh-place finisher Ferdinando Mandrini of Italy, and tenth-place finisher Ladislav Vácha of Czechoslovakia. The event was not held at the 1926 world championships and there was no clear favorite.

The Netherlands made its debut in the men's vault. Hungary competed for the first time since 1896. The other nine nations had all competed in 1924. Switzerland and the United States were each making their third appearance, tied for most of any nation.

== Competition format ==
In the early Olympics, the vault format changed considerably. For 1928, the vault competition consisted of two different jumps: one over a sideways (perpendicular to the approach) pommel horse and one of a lengthwise (parallel to the approach) over a vaulting horse (with no pommels). The pommel horse jump was of a set form while the gymnast could choose the skills to use for the vaulting horse jump. The combined score for the two jumps, of a maximum 30 points, was the result of the event.

The vault was one of the apparatus used in the individual and team all-around scores. It accounted for 1/9 of the score, half of what the other apparatus counted (with the optional and compulsory components of the others counting for 30 points maximum each, rather than 30 points combined).

== Schedule ==
Date	Time	Round
Friday, 10 August 1928		Final

== Results ==
Source: Official results; De Wael

Rank	Gymnast	Nation	Score
1st place, gold medalist(s)	Eugen Mack	Switzerland	28.750
2nd place, silver medalist(s)	Emanuel Löffler	Czechoslovakia	28.500
3rd place, bronze medalist(s)	Stane Derganc	Yugoslavia	28.375
4	Georges Miez	Switzerland	28.250
4	Josip Primožič	Yugoslavia	28.250
6	Georges Leroux	France	28.000
7	August Güttinger	Switzerland	27.750
7	Janez Porenta	Yugoslavia	27.750
7	Herman Witzig	United States	27.750
10	Harold Newhart	United States	27.625
10	Étienne Schmitt	France	27.625
12	Jan Gajdoš	Czechoslovakia	27.375
12	Hans Grieder	Switzerland	27.375
12	Frank Kriz	United States	27.375
12	Melchior Wezel	Switzerland	27.375
16	Romeo Neri	Italy	27.250
16	Heikki Savolainen	Finland	27.250
18	Hermann Hänggi	Switzerland	27.125
18	Otto Pfister	Switzerland	27.125
18	Ladislav Vácha	Czechoslovakia	27.125
21	Edvard Antonijevič	Yugoslavia	27.000
21	Jean Larrouy	France	27.000
21	István Pelle	Hungary	27.000
24	Kalervo Kinos	Finland	26.875
24	Martti Uosikkinen	Finland	26.875
26	Jan Koutný	Czechoslovakia	26.750
26	Mauri Nyberg-Noroma	Finland	26.750
28	Leon Štukelj	Yugoslavia	26.625
29	Glenn Berry	United States	26.500
30	Anton Malej	Yugoslavia	26.375
30	Václav Veselý	Czechoslovakia	26.375
32	Ladislav Tikal	Czechoslovakia	26.250
32	Nic Roeser	Luxembourg	26.250
34	Pieter van Dam	Netherlands	26.125
34	Edi Steinemann	Switzerland	26.125
36	Armand Solbach	France	25.875
37	Boris Gregorka	Yugoslavia	25.750
37	André Lemoine	France	25.750
39	Albert Neumann	Luxembourg	25.625
39	Miklós Péter	Hungary	25.625
41	Dragutin Cioti	Yugoslavia	25.500
41	Al Jochim	United States	25.500
43	Urho Korhonen	Finland	25.375
43	Ted Warren	Great Britain	25.375
45	Rafael Ylönen	Finland	25.250
46	Josef Effenberger	Czechoslovakia	25.125
46	Mario Lertora	Italy	25.125
46	Birger Stenman	Finland	25.125
49	Mozes Jacobs	Netherlands	25.000
49	Rezső Kende	Hungary	25.000
49	Ferdinando Mandrini	Italy	25.000
49	John Pearson	United States	25.000
53	Mathias Logelin	Luxembourg	24.625
54	Jaakko Kunnas	Finland	24.500
55	Hugo Licher	Netherlands	24.250
55	Elias Melkman	Netherlands	24.250
57	Fränz Zouang	Luxembourg	24.125
58	G. C. Raynes	Great Britain	24.000
58	Josy Staudt	Luxembourg	24.000
60	Gyula Kunszt	Hungary	23.875
61	Giuseppe Paris	Italy	23.500
61	Arthur Whitford	Great Britain	23.500
63	Antoine Chatelaine	France	23.375
64	Mario Tambini	Italy	23.250
65	Edouard Grethen	Luxembourg	23.125
65	Frank Haubold	United States	23.125
67	Willibrordus Pouw	Netherlands	22.875
68	Paul Krempel	United States	22.625
69	Klaas Boot	Netherlands	22.500
69	E. A. Walton	Great Britain	22.500
71	Mathias Erang	Luxembourg	22.375
71	József Szalai	Hungary	22.375
73	Géza Tóth	Hungary	21.875
74	Israel Wijnschenk	Netherlands	21.375
75	Jean Gounot	France	21.250
76	Giuseppe Lupi	Italy	20.500
77	Jean-Pierre Urbing	Luxembourg	19.625
78	Bedřich Šupčík	Czechoslovakia	19.000
78	Jacobus van der Vinden	Netherlands	19.000
80	Ezio Roselli	Italy	18.875
81	Vittorio Lucchetti	Italy	18.000
82	T. B. Parkinson	Great Britain	17.875
83	Elemér Pászti	Hungary	17.000
84	Henry Finchett	Great Britain	16.250
85	Bart Cronin	Great Britain	14.750
—	Imre Erdődy	Hungary	DNS
—	Samuel Humphreys	Great Britain	DNS
—	Alfred Krauss	France	DNS
