= Slovenia at the Olympics =

- IOC code: SLO
- NOC: Olympic Committee of Slovenia
- Website: www.olympic.si (in Slovene and English)
- Medals Ranked 51st: Gold 16 Silver 19 Bronze 24 Total 59

Summer appearances
- 1992; 1996; 2000; 2004; 2008; 2012; 2016; 2020; 2024; 2028

Winter appearances
- 1992; 1994; 1998; 2002; 2006; 2010; 2014; 2018; 2022; 2026

Other related appearances
- Austria (1912); Yugoslavia (1920–1988)

Slovenia first participated as an independent nation at the Olympic Games at the 1992 Winter Olympics in Albertville, France, and the country has sent athletes to compete at every Games since then. The Olympic Committee of Slovenia was established in 1991 and was recognised by the International Olympic Committee on 5 February 1992.

Slovenian athletes first competed at the Olympics in Stockholm, at the 1912 Summer Olympics, as part of the Austrian team. There, Rudolf Cvetko became the first Slovene to win an Olympic medal, a silver in the men's team sabre. Then, until Slovenia's independence, they competed as part of Yugoslavia. Before the Second World War, all of the Olympic medals for the Kingdom of Yugoslavia were won by Slovene gymnasts (with the exception of Croatian Dragutin Ciotti who was a member of the bronze medal-winning men's gymnastics all-around team at the 1928 Summer Olympics). Leon Štukelj was the most prominent pre-war athlete, winning three gold, one silver, and two bronze medals, and he is still the most decorated Slovenian Olympian. Among post-war Olympians, Miroslav Cerar won two gold and one bronze medals, also in gymnastics. All of Yugoslavia's Winter Olympic medals (three silver and one bronze) were won by Slovenians with the first being the silver medal of Jure Franko in alpine skiing, won at the 1984 Winter Olympics in Sarajevo, when Yugoslavia hosted the Games.

Athletes representing Slovenia have won a total of 31 medals at the Summer Olympic Games and another 28 at the Winter Olympic Games. Slovenia's most successful Summer Olympics have been the 2020 Summer Olympics where they won three gold medals and five medals overall. The most successful winter games were the 2014 Winter Olympics, where Slovenian athletes won a record eight medals, including two gold. Tina Maze (alpine skiing), Peter Prevc (ski jumping), and Iztok Čop (rowing) are the most decorated post-independence Slovenian Olympians, with four medals each. The shooter Rajmond Debevec has competed at the Olympics eight times. He competed between 1984 and 2012, representing Yugoslavia for his first two appearances. Track and field athlete Merlene Ottey competed at the Olympics seven times between 1980 and 2004. In her first six appearances, she was representing Jamaica, for whom she won nine medals, the seventh time she represented Slovenia. Debevec is the oldest medallist and the oldest Slovenian participant at the Olympics, having won his last medal at the age of 49 in 2012. The youngest participant from Slovenia was Nastja Govejšek, a swimmer, who was 15 at the 2012 games. The youngest Olympic medallist for Slovenia has been alpine skier Alenka Dovžan, who was 18 years old when she competed at the 1994 Winter Olympics. Slovenian athletes have won medals in nine sports at the Summer and in five sports at the Winter Games. The most successful sport for Slovenia at the Summer Olympics is judo with seven medals (three gold) while the most successful sport at the Winter Olympics is ski jumping with eleven medals (four gold). In team sports, the men's national teams have participated four times in handball, twice in ice hockey, and once each in basketball and volleyball, while women's handball team participated once. With a population of just above 2 million, Slovenia often finds itself among countries with the highest medal-per-capita rankings.

== Medal tables ==
=== Medals by Summer Games ===
Games	Athletes	Gold	Silver	Bronze	Total	Rank
1912 Stockholm	as part of Austria					
1920–1988	as part of Yugoslavia					
1992 Barcelona	35	0	0	2	2	52
1996 Atlanta	37	0	2	0	2	55
2000 Sydney	74	2	0	0	2	36
2004 Athens	79	0	1	3	4	63
2008 Beijing	62	1	2	2	5	39
2012 London	65	1	1	2	4	42
2016 Rio de Janeiro	63	1	2	1	4	45
2020 Tokyo	54	3	1	1	5	31
2024 Paris	90	2	1	0	3	34
2028 Los Angeles	future event					
2032 Brisbane	future event					
Total		10	10	11	31	59

=== Medals by Winter Games ===
Games	Athletes	Gold	Silver	Bronze	Total	Rank
1924–1988	as part of Yugoslavia					
1992 Albertville	25	0	0	0	0	–
1994 Lillehammer	22	0	0	3	3	20
1998 Nagano	34	0	0	0	0	–
2002 Salt Lake City	41	0	0	1	1	23
2006 Turin	41	0	0	0	0	–
2010 Vancouver	47	0	2	1	3	21
2014 Sochi	66	2	2	4	8	16
2018 Pyeongchang	71	0	1	1	2	24
2022 Beijing	43	2	3	2	7	15
2026 Milano Cortina	37	2	1	1	4	17
2030 French Alps	future event					
2034 Utah	future event					
Total		6	9	13	28	26

=== Medals by summer sport ===
Leading in that sport

Sport	Gold	Silver	Bronze	Total
Judo	3	1	3	7
Sport climbing	2	0	0	2
Athletics	1	2	1	4
Canoeing	1	2	0	3
Rowing	1	1	3	5
Shooting	1	0	2	3
Cycling	1	0	1	2
Sailing	0	3	1	4
Swimming	0	1	0	1
Totals (9 entries)	10	10	11	31

=== Medals by winter sport ===
Sport	Gold	Silver	Bronze	Total
Ski jumping	4	3	4	11
Alpine skiing	2	3	3	8
Snowboarding	0	2	3	5
Biathlon	0	1	1	2
Cross country skiing	0	0	2	2
Totals (5 entries)	6	9	13	28

== List of medalists ==
=== Summer Olympics ===
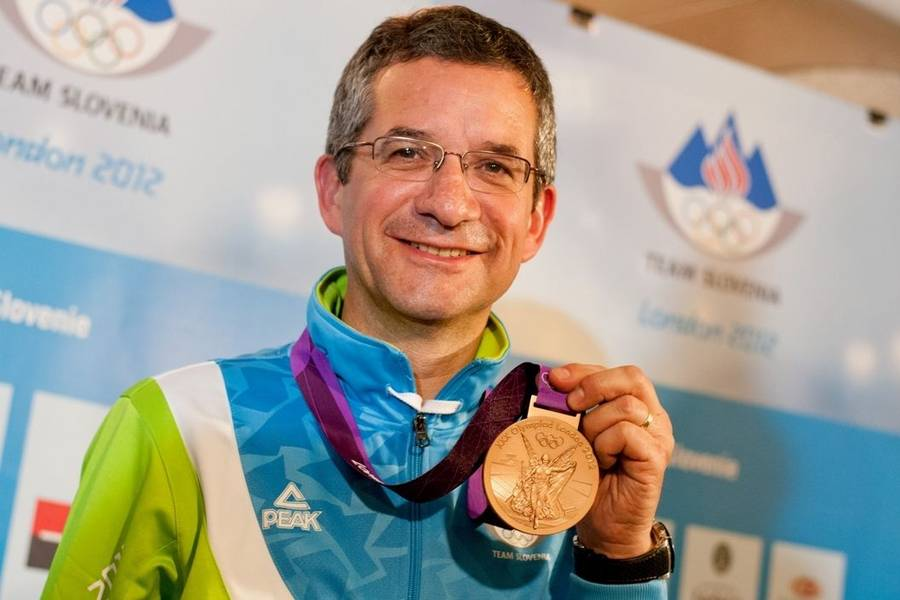
Rajmond Debevec competed at the Olympics eight times and won three medals, including one gold.

Medal	Name	Games	Sport	Event
Bronze	Iztok Čop; Denis Žvegelj	1992 Barcelona	Rowing	Men's coxless pair
Bronze	Milan Janša; Janez Klemenčič; Sašo Mirjanič; Sadik Mujkić	1992 Barcelona	Rowing	Men's coxless four
Silver	Brigita Bukovec	1996 Atlanta	Athletics	Women's 100 metre hurdles
Silver	Andraž Vehovar	1996 Atlanta	Canoeing	Men's K-1 slalom
Gold	Iztok Čop; Luka Špik	2000 Sydney	Rowing	Men's double sculls
Gold	Rajmond Debevec	2000 Sydney	Shooting	Men's 50 metre rifle 3 positions
Silver	Iztok Čop; Luka Špik	2004 Athens	Rowing	Men's double sculls
Bronze	Jolanda Čeplak	2004 Athens	Athletics	Women's 800 metres
Bronze	Urška Žolnir	2004 Athens	Judo	Women's half-middleweight
Bronze	Vasilij Žbogar	2004 Athens	Sailing	Men's Laser class
Gold	Primož Kozmus	2008 Beijing	Athletics	Men's hammer throw
Silver	Vasilij Žbogar	2008 Beijing	Sailing	Men's Laser class
Silver	Sara Isaković	2008 Beijing	Swimming	Women's 200 metre freestyle
Bronze	Lucija Polavder	2008 Beijing	Judo	Women's half-heavyweight
Bronze	Rajmond Debevec	2008 Beijing	Shooting	Men's 50 m rifle three positions
Gold	Urška Žolnir	2012 London	Judo	Women's half-middleweight
Silver	Primož Kozmus	2012 London	Athletics	Men's hammer throw
Bronze	Iztok Čop; Luka Špik	2012 London	Rowing	Men's double sculls
Bronze	Rajmond Debevec	2012 London	Shooting	Men's 50 m rifle prone
Gold	Tina Trstenjak	2016 Rio de Janeiro	Judo	Women's half-middleweight
Silver	Peter Kauzer	2016 Rio de Janeiro	Canoeing	Men's slalom K-1
Silver	Vasilij Žbogar	2016 Rio de Janeiro	Sailing	Men's Finn
Bronze	Anamari Velenšek	2016 Rio de Janeiro	Judo	Women's half-heavyweight
Gold	Benjamin Savšek	2020 Tokyo	Canoeing	Men's slalom C-1
Gold	Primož Roglič	2020 Tokyo	Cycling	Men's road time trial
Gold	Janja Garnbret	2020 Tokyo	Sport climbing	Women's combined
Silver	Tina Trstenjak	2020 Tokyo	Judo	Women's half-middleweight
Bronze	Tadej Pogačar	2020 Tokyo	Cycling	Men's road race
Gold	Andreja Leški	2024 Paris	Judo	Women's half-middleweight
Gold	Janja Garnbret	2024 Paris	Sport climbing	Women's combined
Silver	Toni Vodišek	2024 Paris	Sailing	Men's Formula Kite

=== Winter Olympics ===
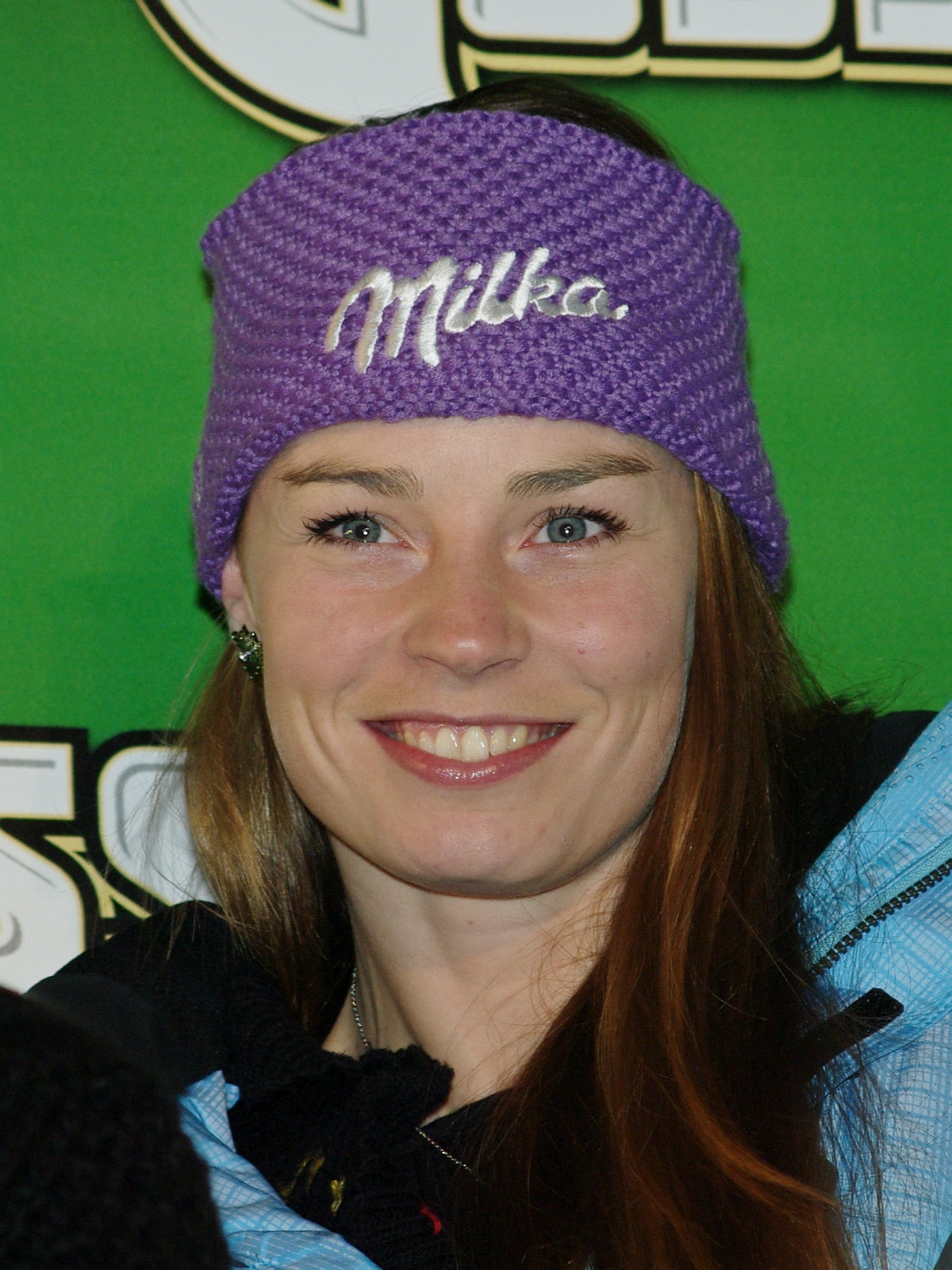
Tina Maze won four Olympic medals, including two gold.

Medal	Name	Games	Sport	Event
Bronze	Alenka Dovžan	1994 Lillehammer	Alpine skiing	Women's combined
Bronze	Jure Košir	1994 Lillehammer	Alpine skiing	Men's slalom
Bronze	Katja Koren	1994 Lillehammer	Alpine skiing	Women's slalom
Bronze	Damjan Fras; Robert Kranjec; Primož Peterka; Peter Žonta	2002 Salt Lake City	Ski jumping	Men's team (K120)
Silver	Tina Maze	2010 Vancouver	Alpine skiing	Women's super-G
Silver	Tina Maze	2010 Vancouver	Alpine skiing	Women's giant slalom
Bronze	Petra Majdič	2010 Vancouver	Cross-country skiing	Women's sprint
Gold	Tina Maze	2014 Sochi	Alpine skiing	Women's downhill
Gold	Tina Maze	2014 Sochi	Alpine skiing	Women's giant slalom
Silver	Peter Prevc	2014 Sochi	Ski jumping	Men's normal hill individual
Silver	Žan Košir	2014 Sochi	Snowboarding	Men's parallel slalom
Bronze	Vesna Fabjan	2014 Sochi	Cross-country skiing	Women's sprint
Bronze	Teja Gregorin	2014 Sochi	Biathlon	Women's pursuit
Bronze	Peter Prevc	2014 Sochi	Ski jumping	Men's large hill individual
Bronze	Žan Košir	2014 Sochi	Snowboarding	Men's parallel giant slalom
Silver	Jakov Fak	2018 Pyeongchang	Biathlon	Men's individual
Bronze	Žan Košir	2018 Pyeongchang	Snowboarding	Men's parallel giant slalom
Gold	Urša Bogataj	2022 Beijing	Ski jumping	Women's normal hill individual
Gold	Nika Križnar; Timi Zajc; Urša Bogataj; Peter Prevc	2022 Beijing	Ski jumping	Mixed team
Silver	Tim Mastnak	2022 Beijing	Snowboarding	Men's parallel giant slalom
Silver	Žan Kranjec	2022 Beijing	Alpine skiing	Men's giant slalom
Silver	Lovro Kos; Cene Prevc; Timi Zajc; Peter Prevc	2022 Beijing	Ski jumping	Men's large hill team
Bronze	Nika Križnar	2022 Beijing	Ski jumping	Women's normal hill individual
Bronze	Gloria Kotnik	2022 Beijing	Snowboarding	Women's parallel giant slalom
Gold	Domen Prevc	2026 Milano Cortina	Ski jumping	Men's large hill individual
Gold	Nika Vodan; Anže Lanišek; Nika Prevc; Domen Prevc	2026 Milano Cortina	Ski jumping	Mixed team
Silver	Nika Prevc	2026 Milano Cortina	Ski jumping	Women's normal hill individual
Bronze	Nika Prevc	2026 Milano Cortina	Ski jumping	Women's large hill individual

== Multiple medal winners ==
Athlete	Sex	Sport	Years	Games	Gold	Silver	Bronze	Total
Tina Maze	F	Alpine skiing	2010–2014	Winter	2	2	0	4
Nika Vodan (Križnar)	F	Ski jumping	2022–2026	Winter	2	0	1	3
Janja Garnbret	F	Sport climbing	2020–2024	Summer	2	0	0	2
Urša Bogataj	F	Ski jumping	2022	Winter	2	0	0	2
Domen Prevc	M	Ski jumping	2026	Winter	2	0	0	2
Peter Prevc	M	Ski jumping	2014–2022	Winter	1	2	1	4
Iztok Čop	M	Rowing	1992–2012	Summer	1	1	2	4
Luka Špik	M	Rowing	2000–2012	Summer	1	1	1	3
Nika Prevc	F	Ski jumping	2026	Winter	1	1	1	3
Primož Kozmus	M	Athletics	2008–2012	Summer	1	1	0	2
Tina Trstenjak	F	Judo	2016–2020	Summer	1	1	0	2
Timi Zajc	M	Ski jumping	2022	Winter	1	1	0	2
Rajmond Debevec	M	Shooting	2000–2012	Summer	1	0	2	3
Urška Žolnir	F	Judo	2004–2012	Summer	1	0	1	2
Vasilij Žbogar	M	Sailing	2004–2016	Summer	0	2	1	3
Žan Košir	M	Snowboarding	2014–2018	Winter	0	1	2	3

This list only contains Olympic medal winners for Slovenia as an independent country. Two medalists for Slovenia also won medals competing under different flags: Sadik Mujkić won a bronze at the 1988 Summer Olympics for Yugoslavia and Jakov Fak won a bronze at the 2010 Winter Olympics for Croatia.

== List of pre-independence Slovenian medalists ==
This list contains Olympic medals won by Slovenian athletes before Slovenia started to participate as an independent country in 1992. The list includes both athletes who won individual medals and athletes who won medals as part of the team. Rudolf Cvetko won a medal as a member of Austrian team. All other athletes won medals for Yugoslavia, which corresponded to Kingdom of Yugoslavia for the Games from 1920 to 1936 and Socialist Federal Republic of Yugoslavia from 1948 to 1988. Stojna Vangelovska, a Macedonian basketball player who won silver with women's team at the 1988 Seoul Olympics, and Vinko Jelovac, a basketball player born in Croatia who won silver with men's team at the 1976 Montreal Olympics, are sometimes included to lists of Slovenian medalists. Both spent important parts of their careers playing for Slovenian clubs. Vangelovska played at Ljubljana's ŽKD Ježica and Jelovac at Ljubljana's KK Olimpija. Jelovac was also twice chosen as Slovenian Sportsman of the Year in the 1970s. After the breakup of Yugoslavia, handball player Iztok Puc first played for the Croatian men's team, winning gold at the 1996 Summer Olympics, and later for Slovenian national team, thus becoming the only handball player to have represented three different teams at the Olympics.

=== Summer Olympics ===
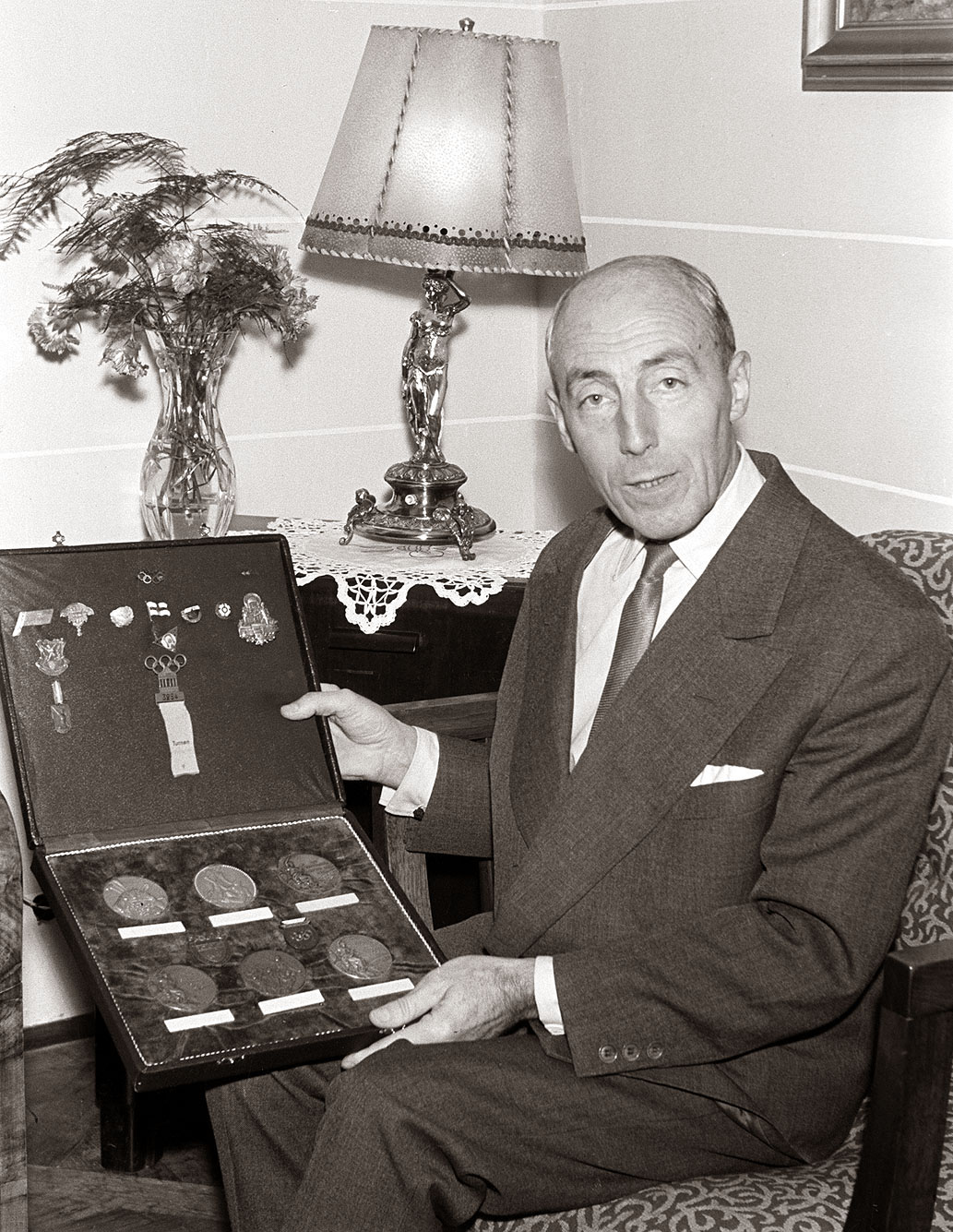
Leon Štukelj was the most prominent pre-independence Slovenian athlete, winning six Olympic medals, including three gold.

Medal	Name	Games	Sport	Event
Silver	Rudolf Cvetko	1912 Stockholm	Fencing	Men's team sabre
Gold	Leon Štukelj	1924 Paris	Gymnastics	Men's individual all-around
Gold	Leon Štukelj	1924 Paris	Gymnastics	Men's horizontal bar
Gold	Leon Štukelj	1928 Amsterdam	Gymnastics	Men's rings
Silver	Josip Primožič	1928 Amsterdam	Gymnastics	Men's parallel bars
Bronze	Leon Štukelj	1928 Amsterdam	Gymnastics	Men's individual all-around
Bronze	Stane Derganc	1928 Amsterdam	Gymnastics	Men's vault
Bronze	Edvard Antosiewicz; Stane Derganc; Boris Gregorka; Anton Malej; Janez Porenta; Josip Primožič; Leon Štukelj	1928 Amsterdam	Gymnastics	Men's team
Silver	Leon Štukelj	1936 Berlin	Gymnastics	Men's rings
Gold	Miroslav Cerar	1964 Tokyo	Gymnastics	Men's pommel horse
Bronze	Miroslav Cerar	1964 Tokyo	Gymnastics	Men's horizontal bar
Gold	Miroslav Cerar	1968 Mexico City	Gymnastics	Men's pommel horse
Silver	Ivo Daneu; Aljoša Žorga	1968 Mexico City	Basketball	Men's team
Gold	Alenka Cuderman	1984 Los Angeles	Handball	Women's team
Gold	Rolando Pušnik	1984 Los Angeles	Handball	Men's team
Bronze	Srečko Katanec; Marko Elsner	1984 Los Angeles	Football	Men's team
Silver	Polona Dornik	1988 Seoul	Basketball	Women's team
Silver	Jure Zdovc	1988 Seoul	Basketball	Men's team
Bronze	Sadik Mujkić; Bojan Prešern	1988 Seoul	Rowing	Men's coxlees pair
Bronze	Iztok Puc; Rolando Pušnik	1988 Seoul	Handball	Men's team

=== Winter Olympics ===
Medal	Name	Games	Sport	Event
Silver	Jure Franko	1984 Sarajevo	Alpine skiing	Men's giant slalom
Silver	Matjaž Debelak; Miran Tepeš; Primož Ulaga; Matjaž Zupan	1988 Calgary	Ski jumping	Team large hill
Silver	Mateja Svet	1988 Calgary	Alpine skiing	Women's slalom
Bronze	Matjaž Debelak	1988 Calgary	Ski jumping	Large hill individual

== See also ==
- List of flag bearers for Slovenia at the Olympics
- Category:Olympic competitors for Slovenia
- Slovenia at the Paralympics
