= Yugoslavia at the 1928 Summer Olympics =

- Flag of the Kingdom of Serbs, Croats and Slovenes
- IOC code: YUG
- NOC: Yugoslav Olympic Committee

in Amsterdam
- Competitors: 34 in 6 sports
- Flag bearer: Dimitrije Stefanović
- Medals Ranked 21st: Gold 1 Silver 1 Bronze 3 Total 5

Summer Olympics appearances (overview)
- 1920; 1924; 1928; 1932; 1936; 1948; 1952; 1956; 1960; 1964; 1968; 1972; 1976; 1980; 1984; 1988; 1992; 1996; 2000

Other related appearances
- Serbia (1912, 2008–); Croatia (1992–); Slovenia (1992–); Bosnia and Herzegovina (1992 S–); Independent Olympic Participants (1992 S); North Macedonia (1996–); Serbia and Montenegro (1996–2006); Montenegro (2008–); Kosovo (2016–)

Athletes from the Kingdom of Serbs, Croats and Slovenes competed at the 1928 Summer Olympics in Amsterdam, Netherlands. 34 competitors, all men, took part in 21 events in 6 sports.

== Medalists ==
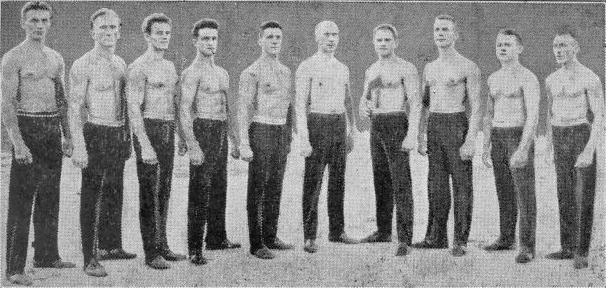
Yugoslav gymnastics team

Medal	Name	Sport	Event
Gold	Leon Štukelj	Gymnastics	Men's rings
Silver	Josip Primožič	Gymnastics	Men's parallel bars
Bronze	Leon Štukelj	Gymnastics	Men's individual all-around
Bronze	Stane Derganc	Gymnastics	Men's vault
Bronze	Edvard Antosiewicz; Dragutin Cioti; Stane Derganc; Boris Gregorka; Anton Malej; Ivan Porenta; Josip Primožič; Leon Štukelj	Gymnastics	Men's team all-around

== Athletics ==
Men's 1500m

- Luka Predanić

Men's marathon

- Dimitrije Stefanović

Men's javelin throw

- Vilim Messner

Men's decathlon

- Branko Kallay

== Cycling ==
Four cyclists, all men, represented Yugoslavia in 1928.

Men's individual and team road race

- Josip Šolar
- Stjepan Ljubić
- Josip Škrabl
- Antun Banek

== Fencing ==
Two fencers, both men, represented Yugoslavia in 1928.

Men's foil

- Ðuro Freund

Men's sabre

- Franjo Fröhlich

== Football ==
Men's tournament

- Danko Premerl
- Franjo Giler
- Geza Šifliš
- Ljubiša Ðorđević
- Kuzman Sotirović
- Ivica Bek
- Mikica Arsenijević
- Milutin Ivković
- Mirko Bonačić
- Slavin Cindrić
- Mića Mitrović
