= List of Olympic medalists for Yugoslavia =

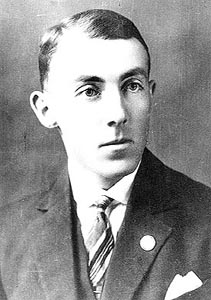
Leon Štukelj was the most successful Yugoslav Olympic athlete.

The Yugoslav Olympic medalists are athletes who competed and won medals for various Yugoslav entities at the Summer and Winter Olympic games between 1920 and 2002. While being part of Yugoslavia, athletes represented three distinct national entities; the Kingdom of Yugoslavia (1920–1936), and the Socialist Federal Republic of Yugoslavia (1948–1988) and the FR Yugoslavia (1994–2002). Yugoslavia was a multinational state with six constitutive ethnic groups; Muslims (e.g. Bosniaks), Croatians, Macedonians, Montenegrins, Serbs and Slovenes, and significant ethnic minorities in Vojvodina (Hungarians) and Kosovo (Albanians). Before the formation of the Kingdom of Yugoslavia in 1918, athletes from the region mostly represented Austria or Hungary, with the sole exception being the 1912 Summer Olympics when a small team of two athletes competed for the Kingdom of Serbia.

Because of the breakup of Yugoslavia in 1991 and 1992, Olympic participation changed. Newly independent Croatia and Slovenia sent their own delegations to the 1992 Winter Olympics, with Yugoslavia represented by athletes from Bosnia and Herzegovina, Macedonia, Montenegro and Serbia.

The Federal Republic of Yugoslavia was established in April 1992, consisting of the Republic of Montenegro and the Republic of Serbia. However, United Nations Security Council Resolution 757 (adopted May 30, 1992) called upon states to:

Take the necessary steps to prevent the participation in sporting events on their territory of persons or groups representing the Federal Republic of Yugoslavia (Serbia and Montenegro);

— Paragraph 8(b)

Despite this, the International Olympic Committee decided unanimously that athletes from Serbia and Montenegro (and also Macedonia) could compete in the 1992 Summer Olympics in Barcelona. The conditions imposed were that the athletes would compete as Independent Olympic Participants (IOP), wear white clothing without distinctive signs, and use the Olympic Anthem and Olympic flag in victory ceremonies. The athletes could not participate at the opening and closing ceremonies of the games.

A team of 52 athletes competed in individual events, with three medals won in shooting. The restriction for individual athletes meant that the men's water polo team, the women's basketball team, and the men's and women's handball teams could not compete, despite having qualified for the Games.

Athletes, who has represented Yugoslavia, has won a total of 52 individual Olympic medals (16 gold, 16 silver and 20 bronze) between 1920 and 1988. The majority were won at the Summer Olympics, with only three medals (two silver and one bronze) won at the Winter Olympics. Leon Štukelj has won the most individual Olympic medals with three gold, one silver and one bronze in gymnastics. He was also part of the bronze medal-winning men's gymnastics team during the 1928 Summer Olympics, making him the most successful Yugoslav athlete in history. Gymnast Miroslav Cerar is the only other athlete with more than one individual gold medal, having won a total of two gold and one bronze medals. Jasna Šekarić is the most successful female Yugoslav athlete with one gold, two silver and one bronze medals in shooting, followed by Đurđica Bjedov, Aleksandra Ivošev and Mateja Svet .

In team events, Yugoslavia has won a total of 35 Olympic medals (10 gold, 16 silver and nine bronze). The most successful team was the men's water polo team, with a combined total of seven medals (three gold and four silver). Similarly successful were the men's handball team (two gold, one bronze) and the men's football and basketball teams with five medals each (one gold, three silver and one bronze). Women's teams shared similar success with the women's handball team winning one gold and one silver and the women's basketball team with one silver and one bronze medals. The only Yugoslav team with a medal from the Winter Olympics was the men's ski jumping team that won silver at the 1988 Winter Olympics.

== Olympic medalists ==
The ranking in the tables below are based on information provided by the International Olympic Committee (IOC) and is consistent with IOC convention in its published medal tables.

=== Individual ===
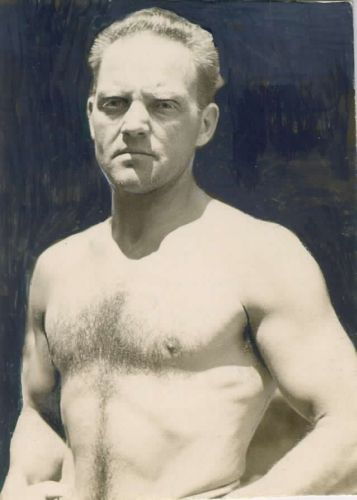
Stane Derganc won a total of two bronze medals in gymnastics.

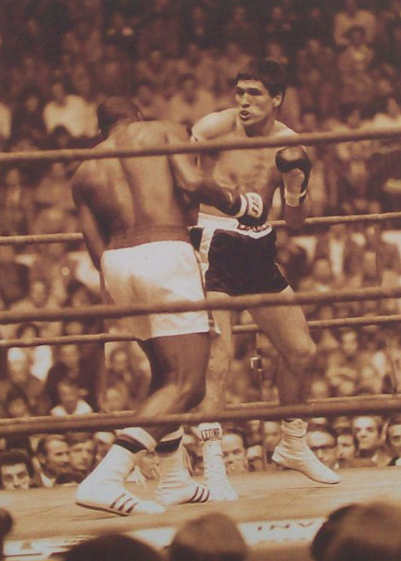
Mate Parlov (right) won Yugoslavia's first Olympic gold medal in boxing.

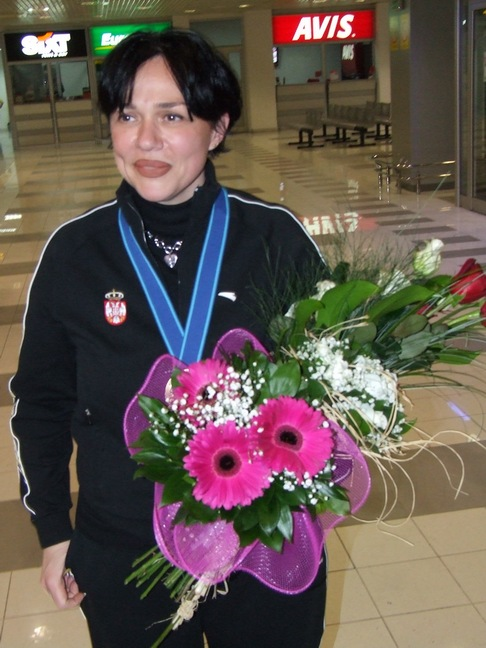
Jasna Šekarić is one of only two Yugoslav female athletes with an individual Olympic gold medal.

Key
♀	Female athlete
§	Part of the Winter Olympics

List of Yugoslav Olympic medalists, and displaying the types of accomplishments and statistics achieved in individual sports.
Rank	Name	Republic	Province	Sport	Gold	Silver	Bronze	Totals
1	Leon Štukelj	SR Slovenia		Gymnastics	3	1	1	5
2	Miroslav Cerar	SR Slovenia		Gymnastics	2	0	1	3
3	Jasna Šekarić ♀	SR Serbia; Serbia		Shooting	1	2	1	4
4	Đurđica Bjedov ♀	SR Croatia		Swimming	1	1	0	2
5	Shaban Tërstena	SR Macedonia		Wrestling	1	1	0	2
6	Branislav Simić	SR Serbia	SAP Vojvodina	Wrestling	1	0	1	2
6	Matija Ljubek	SR Croatia		Canoeing	1	0	1	2
6	Aleksandra Ivošev ♀	Serbia	Vojvodina	Shooting	1	0	1	2
7	Mate Parlov	SR Croatia		Boxing	1	0	0	1
7	Momir Petković	SR Serbia	SAP Vojvodina	Wrestling	1	0	0	1
7	Slobodan Kačar	SR Bosnia and Herzegovina		Boxing	1	0	0	1
7	Anton Josipović	SR Bosnia and Herzegovina		Boxing	1	0	0	1
7	Vlado Lisjak	SR Croatia		Wrestling	1	0	0	1
7	Goran Maksimović	SR Serbia		Shooting	1	0	0	1
8	Branislav Martinović	SR Serbia		Wrestling	0	1	1	2
9	Josip Primožič	SR Slovenia		Gymnastics	0	1	0	1
9	Ivan Gubijan	SR Croatia		Athletics	0	1	0	1
9	Franjo Mihalić	SR Croatia		Athletics	0	1	0	1
9	Stevan Horvat	SR Serbia	SAP Vojvodina	Wrestling	0	1	0	1
9	Josip Čorak	SR Croatia		Wrestling	0	1	0	1
9	Tadija Kačar	SR Bosnia and Herzegovina		Boxing	0	1	0	1
9	Ivan Frgić	SR Serbia	SAP Vojvodina	Wrestling	0	1	0	1
9	Jure Franko	SR Slovenia		Alpine Skiing §	0	1	0	1
9	Redžep Redžepovski	SR Macedonia		Boxing	0	1	0	1
9	Milan Janić	SR Serbia	SAP Vojvodina	Canoeing	0	1	0	1
9	Refik Memišević	SR Serbia	SAP Vojvodina	Wrestling	0	1	0	1
9	Mateja Svet ♀	SR Slovenia		Alpine Skiing §	0	1	0	1
10	Zvonimir Vujin	SR Serbia	SAP Vojvodina	Boxing	0	0	2	2
10	Shaban Sejdiu	SR Macedonia		Wrestling	0	0	2	2
11	Stane Derganc	SR Slovenia		Gymnastics	0	0	1	1
11	Milan Nenadić	SR Croatia		Wrestling	0	0	1	1
11	Ace Rusevski	SR Macedonia		Boxing	0	0	1	1
11	Slavko Obadov	SR Serbia	SAP Vojvodina	Judo	0	0	1	1
11	Radomir Kovačević	SR Bosnia and Herzegovina		Judo	0	0	1	1
11	Mirko Puzović	SR Serbia		Boxing	0	0	1	1
11	Aziz Salihu	SR Serbia	SAP Kosovo	Boxing	0	0	1	1
11	Jožef Tertei	SR Serbia	SAP Vojvodina	Wrestling	0	0	1	1
11	Matjaž Debelak	SR Slovenia		Ski Jumping §	0	0	1	1
11	Damir Škaro	SR Croatia		Boxing	0	0	1	1
11	Aranka Binder ♀	Serbia	Vojvodina	Shooting	0	0	1	1
11	Stevan Pletikosić	Serbia		Shooting	0	0	1	1

==== Medals per region ====
The table shows the number of individual Yugoslav Olympic medals, won per region. Regions used are the Republics that were in use since 1944. All six Socialist Republics have since become fully independent nations and are members of the International Olympic Committee (IOC). The table uses place of birth of the athletes to determine the number of medals per region and not their nationality or ethnic group.

List of Yugoslav Olympic medals per region, and displaying the medalists and types of accomplishments and statistics achieved in individual sports.
Rank	Region	Most successful sport (number of medals)	Gold	Silver	Bronze	Totals
1	Socialist Republic of Serbia; Republic of Serbia: Ivan Frgić, Stevan Horvat, Milan Janić, Goran Maksimović, Branislav Martinović, Refik Memišević, Slavko Obadov, Momir Petković, Mirko Puzović, Aziz Salihu, Branislav Simić, Jasna Šekarić, Jožef Tertei, Zvonimir Vujin, Aranka Binder, Stevan Pletikosić and Aleksandra Ivošev	Wrestling (10)	5	7	11	22
2	Socialist Republic of Slovenia: Miroslav Cerar, Matjaž Debelak, Stane Derganc, Jure Franko, Josip Primožič, Mateja Svet, Leon Štukelj	Gymnastics (10)	5	4	4	13
3	Socialist Republic of Croatia: Đurđica Bjedov, Josip Čorak, Ivan Gubijan, Vlado Lisjak, Matija Ljubek, Franjo Mihalić, Milan Nenadić, Mate Parlov, Damir Škaro	Wrestling (3)	4	4	3	11
4	Socialist Republic of Bosnia and Herzegovina: Slobodan Kačar, Tadija Kačar, Radomir Kovačević, Anton Josipović	Boxing (3)	2	1	1	4
5	Socialist Republic of Macedonia: Redžep Redžepovski, Ace Rusevski, Shaban Sejdiu, Shaban Tërstena	Wrestling (4)	1	2	3	6
6	Socialist Republic of Montenegro (Republic of Montenegro (1992–2006)) Republic of Montenegro	—	—	—	—	—

=== Team ===
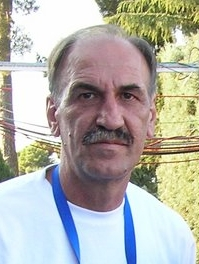
Dražen Dalipagić won gold, silver and bronze medals with the Yugoslav basketball team.

Key
§	Part of the Winter Olympics

List of Yugoslav Olympic medals won in team sports, and displaying the teams and types of accomplishments and statistics.
Rank	Name	Sport	Gold	Silver	Bronze	Totals
1	Men's water polo team: 1952 (S), 1956 (S), 1964 (S), 1968 (G), 1980 (S), 1984 (G), 1988 (G), 2000 (B)	Water polo	3	4	1	8
2	Men's handball team: 1972 (G), 1984 (G), 1988 (B)	Handball	2	0	1	3
3	Men's basketball team: 1968 (S), 1976 (S), 1980 (G), 1984 (B), 1988 (S), 1996 (S)	Basketball	1	4	1	6
4	Men's football team: 1948 (S), 1952 (S), 1956 (S), 1960 (G), 1984 (B)	Football	1	3	1	5
4	Women's handball team: 1980 (S), 1984 (G)	Handball	1	1	0	2
5	Men's volleyball team: 1996 (B), 2000 (G)	Volleyball	1	0	1	2
6	1952 Men's coxless four: (Socialist Republic of Croatia) Duje Bonačić, (Socialist Republic of Croatia) Velimir Valenta, (Socialist Republic of Croatia) Mate Trojanović, (Socialist Republic of Croatia) Petar Šegvić	Rowing	1	0	0	1
6	1984 Men's C-2 500 metres: (Socialist Republic of Croatia) Matija Ljubek and (Socialist Republic of Serbia) Mirko Nišović	Canoeing	1	0	0	1
7	Women's basketball team: 1980 (B), 1988 (S)	Basketball	0	1	1	2
7	1980 and 1984 Men's double sculls: (Socialist Republic of Serbia) Zoran Pančić and (Socialist Republic of Serbia) Milorad Stanulov	Rowing	0	1	1	2
8	1984 Men's C-2 1000 metres: (Socialist Republic of Croatia) Matija Ljubek and (Socialist Republic of Serbia) Mirko Nišović	Canoeing	0	1	0	1
8	1988 Men's team large hill: (Socialist Republic of Slovenia) Matjaž Debelak, (Socialist Republic of Slovenia) Primož Ulaga, (Socialist Republic of Slovenia) Miran Tepeš and (Socialist Republic of Slovenia) Matjaž Zupan	Ski Jumping §	0	1	0	1
8	1988 Men's doubles: (Socialist Republic of Serbia) Ilija Lupulesku and (Socialist Republic of Croatia) Zoran Primorac	Table tennis	0	1	0	1
9	1928 Men's team competition: (Socialist Republic of Slovenia) Edvard Antonijevič, (Socialist Republic of Croatia) Dragutin Ciotti, (Socialist Republic of Slovenia) Stane Derganc, (Socialist Republic of Slovenia) Boris Gregorka, (Socialist Republic of Slovenia) Anton Malej, (Socialist Republic of Slovenia) Janez Porenta, (Socialist Republic of Slovenia) Josip Primožič and (Socialist Republic of Slovenia) Leon Štukelj	Gymnastics	0	0	1	1
9	1980 Men's coxed pair: (Socialist Republic of Croatia) Zlatko Celent, (Socialist Republic of Croatia) Duško Mrduljaš and (Socialist Republic of Croatia) Josip Reić	Rowing	0	0	1	1
9	1988 Men's coxless pair: (Socialist Republic of Slovenia) Sadik Mujkič and (Socialist Republic of Slovenia) Bojan Prešern	Rowing	0	0	1	1
9	1988 Women's doubles: (Socialist Republic of Bosnia and Herzegovina) Jasna Fazlić and (Socialist Republic of Serbia) Gordana Perkučin	Table tennis	0	0	1	1

== Footnotes ==
1. Muslims was a term used for one of the constitutive nations in the Socialist Federal Republic of Yugoslavia as an official ethnic designation of nationality of Slavic Muslims and thus encompassed a number of populations ethnically distinct, including the Bosniaks, and to a minor extent Gorani, Pomaks and Macedonian Muslims.
1. Leon Štukelj, Josip Primožič and Stane Derganc were all part of the Yugoslav men's gymnastics team during the 1928 Summer Olympics, which won a bronze medal. Combined with individual medals Štukelj's total medal tally includes three gold, one silver and two bronze, Primožič's one silver and one bronze and Dergenc's two bronze.
2. Jasna Šekarić, Aranka Binder and Stevan Pletikosić won medals as Independent Olympic Participants at the 1992 Summer Olympics.
2. Matija Ljubek was part of the gold medal winning Men's C-2 500 metres double and the silver medal winning Men's C-2 1000 metres double, at the 1984 Summer Olympics. Both times he was paired with Mirko Nišović. Combined with individual medals his total Olympic medals tally includes two gold, one silver and one bronze.
3. Matjaž Debelak was part of the silver medal winning men's team on the Ski Jumping large hill event, at the 1988 Winter Olympics. Combined with his individual medal his total Olympic medals tally includes one silver and one bronze.
4. Athletes from Slovenia have won all Yugoslav medals (individual) in gymnastics, for an Olympic tally of five gold, two silver and three bronze. In addition, all members of the bronze medal winning men's gymnastics team during the 1928 Summer Olympics were from Slovenia, except Dragutin Ciotti who was born in Rijeka, present day Croatia.
5. Athletes from Slovenia have won all Yugoslav medals at the Winter Olympics (individually and as a team), for an Olympic tally of three silver medals and one bronze.
6. Athletes from Bosnia and Herzegovina have won all their medals in combat sport (boxing and judo).
7. Athletes from Macedonia have won all their medals in combat sport (boxing and wrestling).

== See also ==
- Olympic Committee of Bosnia and Herzegovina
- Croatian Olympic Committee
- Macedonian Olympic Committee
- Montenegrin Olympic Committee
- Olympic Committee of Serbia
- Slovenian Olympic Committee
- Yugoslav Olympic Committee
- International Olympic Committee
