= Gymnastics at the 1928 Summer Olympics – Men's artistic team all-around =

Men's team at the Games of the IX Olympiad
- Venue: Olympic Stadium
- Competitors: 88 from 11 nations

Medalists
| 1st place, gold medalist(s) | | Switzerland; Hans Grieder, August Güttinger, Hermann Hänggi, Eugen Mack, Georges Miez, Otto Pfister, Eduard Steinemann, Melchior Wezel |
| 2nd place, silver medalist(s) | | Czechoslovakia; Josef Effenberger, Jan Gajdoš, Jan Koutný, Emanuel Löffler, Bedřich Šupčík, Ladislav Tikal, Ladislav Vácha, Václav Veselý |
| 3rd place, bronze medalist(s) | | Yugoslavia; Edvard Antonijevič, Dragutin Cioti, Stane Derganc, Boris Gregorka, Anton Malej, Ivan Porenta, Josip Primožič, Leon Štukelj |

The men's team event was part of the gymnastics programme at the 1928 Summer Olympics. It was one of seven gymnastics events for men and was the sixth Olympic men's team gymnastic championship. Each national team dropped its two lowest scores on each apparatus to calculate the country's score for that apparatus; the five apparatus scores were then summed along with a team drill score to give a team total.

== Results ==
| Rank | Nation | Gymnast | Individual results | | | | | | | | | | | | | | | | | | | | | | | | Team drill | Team total |
| Rank | Nation | Gymnast | Pommel horse | | | | Rings (gymnastics) | | | | Horizontal bar | | | | Parallel bars | | | | Vault (gymnastics) | | Individual totals | | | | | | Team drill | Team total |
| Rank | Nation | Gymnast | C | V | total | rank | C | V | total | rank | C | V | total | rank | C | V | total | rank | total | rank | C totals | rank | V totals | rank | Grand Totals | rank | Team drill | Team total |
|---|---|---|---|---|---|---|---|---|---|---|---|---|---|---|---|---|---|---|---|---|---|---|---|---|---|---|---|---|
| 1st place, gold medalist(s) | Switzerland | Otto Pfister | 25.75 | 27.50 | 53.25 | | 25.25 | 22.00 | 47.25 | | 25.50 | 27.75 | 53.25 | | 23.50 | 26.50 | 50.00 | | 27.125 | | 100.00 | | 103.75 | | ~~230.875~~ | 24 | 264.750 | 1718.625 |
| 1st place, gold medalist(s) | Switzerland | August Güttinger | 28.25 | 27.50 | 55.75 | 5 | 24.50 | 24.00 | 48.50 | | 28.25 | 27.50 | 55.75 | 7 | 25.25 | 24.75 | 50.00 | | 27.750 | 7 | 106.25 | | 103.75 | | 237.750 | 16 | 264.750 | 1718.625 |
| 1st place, gold medalist(s) | Switzerland | Melchior Wezel | 27.50 | 27.00 | 54.50 | 7 | 26.75 | 25.00 | 51.75 | | 25.75 | 28.00 | 53.75 | | 26.50 | 27.00 | 53.50 | 7 | 27.375 | | 106.50 | | 107.00 | | 240.875 | 12 | 264.750 | 1718.625 |
| 1st place, gold medalist(s) | Switzerland | Hans Grieder | 24.50 | 25.75 | 50.25 | | 25.00 | 22.50 | 47.50 | | 26.50 | 29.25 | 55.75 | 7 | 27.00 | 26.25 | 53.25 | | 27.375 | | 103.00 | | 103.75 | | ~~234.125~~ | 18 | 264.750 | 1718.625 |
| 1st place, gold medalist(s) | Switzerland | Edi Steinemann | 27.75 | 28.25 | 56.00 | 4 | 26.00 | 24.75 | 50.75 | | 28.25 | 25.50 | 53.75 | | 25.50 | 25.75 | 51.25 | | 26.125 | | 107.50 | 10 | 104.25 | | 237.875 | 15 | 264.750 | 1718.625 |
| 1st place, gold medalist(s) | Switzerland | Hermann Hänggi | 29.50 | 29.75 | 59.25 | 1 | 24.75 | 24.75 | 49.50 | | 28.00 | 28.50 | 56.50 | 4 | 26.25 | 28.00 | 54.25 | 3 | 27.125 | | 108.50 | 5 | 111.00 | 2 | 246.625 | 2 | 264.750 | 1718.625 |
| 1st place, gold medalist(s) | Switzerland | Georges Miez | 28.50 | 29.25 | 57.75 | 2 | 27.00 | 27.25 | 54.25 | 8 | 29.25 | 28.25 | 57.50 | 1 | 25.75 | 24.00 | 49.75 | | 28.250 | 4 | 110.50 | 1 | 108.75 | 8 | 247.500 | 1 | 264.750 | 1718.625 |
| 1st place, gold medalist(s) | Switzerland | Eugen Mack | 27.25 | 27.00 | 54.25 | 9 | 26.25 | 26.25 | 52.50 | | 28.75 | 28.00 | 56.75 | 3 | 23.00 | 28.00 | 51.00 | | 28.750 | 1 | 105.25 | | 109.25 | 5 | 243.250 | 8 | 264.750 | 1718.625 |
| 1st place, gold medalist(s) | Switzerland | Totals: | | | 337.50 | | | | 307.25 | | | | 334.00 | | | | 309.75 | | 165.375 | | | | | | | | 264.750 | 1718.625 |
| 2nd place, silver medalist(s) | Czechoslovakia | Jan Koutný | 19.50 | 23.25 | 42.75 | | 25.50 | 27.00 | 52.50 | | 27.00 | 25.25 | 52.25 | | 27.75 | 23.25 | 51.00 | | 26.750 | | 99.75 | | 98.75 | | ~~225.250~~ | 31 | 286.500 | 1712.500 |
| 2nd place, silver medalist(s) | Czechoslovakia | Václav Veselý | 22.75 | 23.75 | 46.50 | | 25.25 | 27.25 | 52.50 | | 25.50 | 26.50 | 52.00 | | 25.50 | 24.75 | 50.25 | | 26.375 | | 99.00 | | 102.25 | | 227.625 | 28 | 286.500 | 1712.500 |
| 2nd place, silver medalist(s) | Czechoslovakia | Ladislav Tikal | 23.25 | 22.25 | 45.50 | | 23.00 | 25.75 | 48.75 | | 23.50 | 23.25 | 46.75 | | 25.00 | 25.50 | 50.50 | | 26.250 | | 94.75 | | 96.75 | | ~~217.750~~ | 37 | 286.500 | 1712.500 |
| 2nd place, silver medalist(s) | Czechoslovakia | Emanuel Löffler† | 25.75 | 26.25 | 52.00 | | 27.25 | 28.25 | 55.50† | 3† | 27.25 | 26.75 | 54.00 | | 26.50 | 26.00 | 52.50 | | 28.500 | 2 | 106.75 | | 107.25 | | 242.500 | 10 | 286.500 | 1712.500 |
| 2nd place, silver medalist(s) | Czechoslovakia | Jan Gajdoš | 26.25 | 27.75 | 54.00 | 10 | 25.50 | 28.75 | 54.25 | 8 | 24.00 | 27.25 | 51.25 | | 27.25 | 26.50 | 53.75 | 4 | 27.375 | | 103.00 | | 110.25 | 3 | 240.625 | 13 | 286.500 | 1712.500 |
| 2nd place, silver medalist(s) | Czechoslovakia | Ladislav Vácha | 20.00 | 27.00 | 47.00 | | 28.00 | 29.50 | 57.50 | 2 | 26.75 | 28.00 | 54.75 | | 28.25 | 28.25 | 56.50 | 1 | 27.125 | | 103.00 | | 112.75 | 1 | 242.875 | 9 | 286.500 | 1712.500 |
| 2nd place, silver medalist(s) | Czechoslovakia | Josef Effenberger | 28.50 | 25.50 | 54.00 | 10 | 25.00 | 27.00 | 52.00 | | 28.75 | 26.75 | 55.50 | 9 | 26.00 | 26.25 | 52.25 | | 25.125 | | 108.25 | 6 | 105.50 | | 238.875 | 14 | 286.500 | 1712.500 |
| 2nd place, silver medalist(s) | Czechoslovakia | Bedřich Šupčík | 27.50 | 24.00 | 51.50 | | 26.00 | 28.75 | 54.75 | 6 | 28.75 | 25.50 | 54.25 | | 27.00 | 26.75 | 53.75 | 4 | 19.000 | | 109.25 | 3 | 105.00 | | 233.250 | 20 | 286.500 | 1712.500 |
| 2nd place, silver medalist(s) | Czechoslovakia | Totals: | | | 305.00 | | | | 326.50 | | | | 321.75 | | | | 319.00 | | 153.500 | | | | | | | | 286.500 | 1712.500 |
| 3rd place, bronze medalist(s) | Yugoslavia | Dragutin Cioti | 19.75 | 25.00 | 44.75 | | 24.75 | 24.50 | 49.25 | | 24.50 | 21.25 | 45.75 | | 21.50 | 23.25 | 44.75 | | 25.500 | | 90.50 | | 94.00 | | ~~210.000~~ | 45 | 261.750 | 1648.750 |
| 3rd place, bronze medalist(s) | Yugoslavia | Edvard Antonijevič | 25.75 | 22.75 | 48.50 | | 28.50 | 25.50 | 54.00 | | 24.75 | 26.25 | 51.00 | | 22.50 | 25.00 | 47.50 | | 27.000 | | 101.50 | | 99.50 | | 228.000 | 26 | 261.750 | 1648.750 |
| 3rd place, bronze medalist(s) | Yugoslavia | Boris Gregorka | 21.50 | 26.25 | 47.75 | | 25.25 | 24.00 | 49.25 | | 25.75 | 24.00 | 49.75 | | 24.75 | 23.75 | 48.50 | | 25.750 | | 97.25 | | 98.00 | | 221.000 | 33 | 261.750 | 1648.750 |
| 3rd place, bronze medalist(s) | Yugoslavia | Janez Porenta | 25.75 | 25.50 | 51.25 | | 28.00 | 25.25 | 53.25 | | 15.25 | 22.50 | 37.75 | | 24.75 | 25.50 | 50.25 | | 27.750 | 7 | 93.75 | | 98.75 | | 220.250 | 34 | 261.750 | 1648.750 |
| 3rd place, bronze medalist(s) | Yugoslavia | Josip Primožič | 24.25 | 27.50 | 51.75 | | 26.75 | 25.75 | 52.50 | | 28.50 | 27.50 | 56.00 | 6 | 28.75 | 26.75 | 55.50 | 2 | 28.250 | 4 | 108.25 | 6 | 107.50 | | 244.000 | 5 | 261.750 | 1648.750 |
| 3rd place, bronze medalist(s) | Yugoslavia | Stane Derganc | 21.75 | 27.00 | 48.75 | | 25.00 | 24.00 | 49.00 | | 17.00 | 22.50 | 39.50 | | 22.75 | 23.50 | 46.25 | | 28.375 | 3 | 86.50 | | 97.00 | | ~~211.875~~ | 43 | 261.750 | 1648.750 |
| 3rd place, bronze medalist(s) | Yugoslavia | Leon Štukelj | 28.00 | 25.25 | 53.25 | | 29.00 | 28.75 | 57.75 | 1 | 27.00 | 26.75 | 53.75 | | 26.00 | 27.50 | 53.50 | 7 | 26.625 | | 110.00 | 2 | 108.25 | | 244.875 | 3 | 261.750 | 1648.750 |
| 3rd place, bronze medalist(s) | Yugoslavia | Anton Malej | 25.5 | 27.00 | 52.50 | | 26.50 | 26.25 | 52.75 | | 24.00 | 22.00 | 46.00 | | 25.25 | 26.00 | 51.25 | | 26.375 | | 101.25 | | 101.25 | | 228.875 | 25 | 261.750 | 1648.750 |
| 3rd place, bronze medalist(s) | Yugoslavia | Totals: | | | 305.00 | | | | 319.50 | | | | 294.25 | | | | 306.50 | | 161.75 | | | | | | | | 261.750 | 1648.750 |
| 4 | France | Jean Larrouy | 28.00 | 24.50 | 52.50 | | 25.50 | 22.50 | 48.00 | | 28.00 | 22.75 | 50.75 | | 21.25 | 27.00 | 48.25 | | 27.000 | | 102.75 | | 96.75 | | 226.500 | 29 | 249.000 | 1620.750 |
| 4 | France | Armand Solbach | 25.25 | 27.75 | 53.00 | | 27.25 | 27.00 | 54.25 | 8 | 27.25 | 28.25 | 55.50 | 9 | 27.25 | 25.75 | 53.00 | | 25.875 | | 107.00 | | 108.75 | 8 | 241.625 | 11 | 249.000 | 1620.750 |
| 4 | France | Alfred Krauss | 22.00 | 27.00 | 49.00 | | 24.50 | 26.75 | 51.25 | | Injured | 0 | 0 | | 0 | 0 | 0 | | 0 | | 46.50 | | 53.75 | | ~~100.250~~ | 87 | 249.000 | 1620.750 |
| 4 | France | Jean Gounot | 23.25 | 27.50 | 50.75 | | 23.00 | 24.75 | 47.75 | | 27.00 | 27.25 | 54.25 | | 17.75 | 25.00 | 42.75 | | 21.250 | | 91.00 | | 104.50 | | 216.750 | 39 | 249.000 | 1620.750 |
| 4 | France | Georges Leroux | 27.25 | 27.50 | 54.75 | 6 | 24.50 | 23.00 | 47.50 | | 26.75 | 26.50 | 53.25 | | 25.75 | 26.50 | 52.25 | | 28.000 | 6 | 104.25 | | 103.50 | | 235.750 | 17 | 249.000 | 1620.750 |
| 4 | France | Antoine Chatelaine | 16.25 | 21.75 | 38.00 | | 23.75 | 26.00 | 49.75 | | 24.50 | 24.75 | 49.25 | | 17.25 | 24.75 | 42.00 | | 23.375 | | 81.75 | | 97.25 | | ~~202.375~~ | 54 | 249.000 | 1620.750 |
| 4 | France | André Lemoine†† | 23.00 | 24.75 | 47.75 | | 25.75 | 25.00 | 50.75 | | 27.75 | 26.25 | 54.00 | | 27.25 | 26.50 | 53.75 | 4 | 25.750 | | 103.75 | | 102.50 | | 232.000 | 23†† | 249.000 | 1620.750 |
| 4 | France | Étienne Schmitt | 24.50 | 24.25 | 48.75 | | 24.00 | 24.75 | 48.75 | | 21.50 | 26.00 | 47.50 | | 22.75 | 23.75 | 46.50 | | 27.625 | 10 | 92.75 | | 98.75 | | 219.125 | 35 | 249.000 | 1620.750 |
| 4 | France | Totals: | | | 307.50 | | | | 297.00 | | | | 315.25 | | | | 296.50 | | 155.500 | | | | | | | | 249.000 | 1620.750 |
| 5 | Finland | Jaakko Kunnas | 17.75 | 24.50 | 42.25 | | 24.75 | 25.25 | 50.00 | | 25.75 | 25.50 | 51.25 | | 24.75 | 24.75 | 49.50 | | 24.500 | | 93.00 | | 100.00 | | 217.500 | 37 | 273.750 | 1609.250††† |
| 5 | Finland | Martti Uosikkinen†† | 25.75 | 23.75 | 49.50 | | 27.75 | 24.75 | 52.50 | | 27.50 | 26.50 | 54.00 | | 25.25 | 25.75 | 51.00 | | 26.875 | | 106.25 | | 100.75 | | 233.875 | 19†† | 273.750 | 1609.250††† |
| 5 | Finland | Urho Korhonen | 15.00 | 21.75 | 36.75 | | 24.50 | 25.25 | 49.75 | | 25.75 | 25.50 | 51.25 | | 22.25 | 24.50 | 46.75 | | 25.375 | | 87.50 | | 97.00 | | 209.875 | 46 | 273.750 | 1609.250††† |
| 5 | Finland | Mauri Nyberg-Noroma | 26.75 | 27.75 | 54.50 | 7 | 26.75 | 28.25 | 55.00 | 5 | 28.25 | 25.75 | 54.00 | | 26.50 | 27.00 | 53.50 | 7 | 26.750 | | 108.25 | 6 | 108.75 | 8 | 243.750 | 6 | 273.750 | 1609.250††† |
| 5 | Finland | Rafael Ylönen | 15.50 | 19.50 | 35.00 | | 21.75 | 23.25 | 45.00 | | 24.00 | 25.50 | 49.50 | | 12.00 | 22.00 | 34.00 | | 25.250 | | 73.25 | | 90.25 | | 188.750 | 61 | 273.750 | 1609.250††† |
| 5 | Finland | Heikki Savolainen | 28.75 | 27.75 | 56.50 | 3 | 27.50 | 26.25 | 53.75 | | 28.0 | 26.50 | 54.50 | | 25.00 | 26.75 | 51.75 | | 27.250 | | 109.25 | 3 | 107.25 | | 243.750 | 6 | 273.750 | 1609.250††† |
| 5 | Finland | Kalervo Kinos | 9.00 | 18.00 | 27.00 | | 19.50 | 23.00 | 42.50 | | 22.00 | 23.25 | 45.25 | | 21.25 | 22.50 | 43.75 | | 26.875 | | 71.75 | | 86.75 | | ~~185.375~~ | 62 | 273.750 | 1609.250††† |
| 5 | Finland | Birger Stenman | 5.25 | 15.00 | 20.25 | | 20.75 | 22.25 | 43.00 | | 22.00 | 25.25 | 47.25 | | 19.50 | 24.25 | 43.75 | | 25.125 | | 67.50 | | 86.75 | | ~~179.375~~ | 66 | 273.750 | 1609.250††† |
| 5 | Finland | Totals: | | | 265.50††† | | | | 303.00††† | | | | 324.50††† | | | | 286.50 | | 156.000 | | | | | | | | 273.750 | 1609.250††† |
| 6 | Italy | Mario Lertora †† | 22.75 | 26.75 | 49.50 | | 25.00 | 26.50 | 51.50 | | 27.50 | 26.25 | 53.75 | | 25.75 | 27.75 | 53.50 | 7 | 25.125 | | 101.00 | | 106.75 | | 232.875 | 21†† | 230.250 | 1599.125 |
| 6 | Italy | Vittorio Lucchetti | 25.25 | 25.50 | 50.75 | | 26.00 | 27.00 | 53.00 | | 28.00 | 28.50 | 56.50 | 4 | 21.75 | 28.00 | 49.75 | | 18.000 | | 101.00 | | 109.00 | 6 | 228.000 | 26 | 230.250 | 1599.125 |
| 6 | Italy | Giuseppe Lupi | 24.00 | 26.50 | 50.50 | | 24.25 | 26.25 | 50.50 | | 26.50 | 27.50 | 54.00 | | 22.00 | 26.50 | 48.50 | | 20.500 | | 96.75 | | 106.75 | | 224.000 | 32 | 230.250 | 1599.125 |
| 6 | Italy | Ferdinando Mandrini | 23.50 | 26.75 | 50.25 | | 22.75 | 27.00 | 49.75 | | 26.50 | 28.75 | 55.25 | | 19.50 | 26.50 | 46.00 | | 25.000 | | 92.25 | | 109.00 | 6 | 226.250 | 30 | 230.250 | 1599.125 |
| 6 | Italy | Romeo Neri† | 24.50 | 27.00 | 51.50 | | 28.25 | 27.75 | 56.00† | 3† | 28.25 | 28.75 | 57.00 | 2 | 27.00 | 26.00 | 53.00 | | 27.250 | | 108.00 | 9 | 109.50 | 4 | 244.750 | 4 | 230.250 | 1599.125 |
| 6 | Italy | Giuseppe Paris | 20.75 | 27.50 | 48.25 | | 23.50 | 26.75 | 50.25 | | 22.50 | 26.00 | 48.50 | | 14.75 | 18.00 | 32.75 | | 23.500 | | 81.50 | | 98.25 | | ~~203.250~~ | 53 | 230.250 | 1599.125 |
| 6 | Italy | Ezio Roselli | 21.50 | 23.75 | 45.25 | | 25.00 | 25.50 | 50.50 | | 22.25 | 22.00 | 44.25 | | 12.00 | 21.75 | 33.75 | | 18.875 | | 80.75 | | 93.00 | | ~~192.625~~ | 58 | 230.250 | 1599.125 |
| 6 | Italy | Mario Tambini | 21.00 | 25.75 | 46.75 | | 22.50 | 26.00 | 48.50 | | 26.50 | 26.00 | 52.50 | | 15.75 | 25.75 | 41.50 | | 23.250 | | 85.75 | | 103.50 | | 212.500 | 41 | 230.250 | 1599.125 |
| 6 | Italy | Totals: | | | 299.25 | | | | 309.25 | | | | 329.00 | | | | 292.25 | | 139.125 | | | | | | | | 230.250 | 1599.125 |
| 7 | United States | Al Jochim | 19.75 | 26.00 | 45.75 | | 25.00 | 27.75 | 52.75 | | 17.75 | 26.25 | 44.00 | | 24.50 | 25.75 | 50.25 | | 25.500 | | 87.00 | | 105.75 | | 218.250 | 36 | 249.000 | 1519.125 |
| 7 | United States | Frank Haubold | 24.00 | 26.00 | 50.00 | | 18.50 | 26.00 | 44.50 | | 21.00 | 24.25 | 45.25 | | 22.00 | 24.50 | 46.50 | | 23.125 | | 85.50 | | 100.75 | | 209.375 | 47 | 249.000 | 1519.125 |
| 7 | United States | Paul Krempel | 21.00 | 26.25 | 47.25 | | 26.50 | 28.00 | 54.50 | 7 | 16.50 | 23.75 | 40.25 | | 23.25 | 15.75 | 39.00 | | 22.625 | | 87.25 | | 93.75 | | ~~203.625~~ | 52 | 249.000 | 1519.125 |
| 7 | United States | Herman Witzig | 18.00 | 25.50 | 43.50 | | 19.75 | 23.00 | 42.75 | | 24.50 | 22.50 | 47.00 | | 21.75 | 23.50 | 45.25 | | 27.750 | 7 | 84.00 | | 94.50 | | ~~206.250~~ | 51 | 249.000 | 1519.125 |
| 7 | United States | Frank Kriz | 21.75 | 25.75 | 47.50 | | 16.00 | 23.25 | 39.25 | | 26.25 | 26.75 | 53.00 | | 20.25 | 24.25 | 44.50 | | 27.375 | | 84.25 | | 100.00 | | 211.625 | 44 | 249.000 | 1519.125 |
| 7 | United States | John Pearson | 23.75 | 26.75 | 50.50 | | 18.25 | 23.00 | 41.25 | | 20.75 | 24.25 | 45.00 | | 22.00 | 25.00 | 47.00 | | 25.000 | | 84.75 | | 99.00 | | 208.750 | 50 | 249.000 | 1519.125 |
| 7 | United States | Harold Newhart | 23.25 | 25.00 | 48.25 | | 19.50 | 23.00 | 42.50 | | 24.00 | 25.25 | 49.25 | | 18.25 | 23.50 | 41.75 | | 27.625 | 10 | 85.00 | | 96.75 | | 209.375 | 47 | 249.000 | 1519.125 |
| 7 | United States | Glenn Berry | 21.25 | 23.25 | 44.50 | | 23.50 | 24.25 | 47.75 | | 20.75 | 26.75 | 47.50 | | 24.00 | 22.50 | 46.50 | | 26.500 | | 89.50 | | 96.75 | | 212.750 | 40 | 249.000 | 1519.125 |
| 7 | United States | Totals: | | | 286.50 | | | | 268.00 | | | | 284.00 | | | | 276.50 | | 155.125 | | | | | | | | 249.000 | 1519.125 |
| 8 | Netherlands | Elias Melkman | 16.25 | 22.50 | 38.75 | | 23.00 | 25.75 | 48.75 | | 23.00 | 26.50 | 49.50 | | 15.50 | 22.75 | 38.25 | | 24.250 | | 77.75 | | 97.50 | | 199.500 | 56 | 251.250 | 1364.875 |
| 8 | Netherlands | Jacobus van der Vinden | 22.00 | 10.00 | 32.00 | | 19.25 | 18.50 | 37.75 | | 23.50 | 25.25 | 48.75 | | 11.00 | 20.50 | 31.50 | | 19.000 | | 75.75 | | 74.25 | | 169.000 | 71 | 251.250 | 1364.875 |
| 8 | Netherlands | Willibrordus Pouw | 13.75 | 23.75 | 37.50 | | 18.25 | 21.75 | 40.00 | | 18.50 | 24.00 | 42.50 | | 17.50 | 21.75 | 39.25 | | 22.875 | | 68.00 | | 91.25 | | 182.125 | 65 | 251.250 | 1364.875 |
| 8 | Netherlands | Israel Wijnschenk | 19.00 | 25.00 | 44.00 | | 16.00 | 23.75 | 39.75 | | 17.7 | 25.00 | 42.75 | | 14.25 | 20.50 | 34.75 | | 21.375 | | 67.00 | | 94.25 | | 182.625 | 64 | 251.250 | 1364.875 |
| 8 | Netherlands | Mozes Jacobs | 26.25 | 25.00 | 51.25 | | 21.50 | 24.50 | 46.00 | | 16.75 | 9.00 | 25.75 | | 19.00 | 23.00 | 42.00 | | 25.000 | | 83.50 | | 81.50 | | 190.000 | 60 | 251.250 | 1364.875 |
| 8 | Netherlands | Pieter van Dam | 20.25 | 21.00 | 41.25 | | 15.50 | 22.75 | 38.25 | | 16.25 | 25.75 | 42.00 | | 22.00 | 20.75 | 42.75 | | 26.125 | | 74.00 | | 90.25 | | 190.375 | 59 | 251.250 | 1364.875 |
| 8 | Netherlands | Klaas Boot | 11.25 | 21.75 | 33.00 | | 13.50 | 22.50 | 36.00 | | 16.50 | 23.75 | 40.25 | | 15.50 | 21.75 | 37.25 | | 22.500 | | 56.75 | | 89.75 | | ~~169.000~~ | 71 | 251.250 | 1364.875 |
| 8 | Netherlands | Hugo Licher | 19.50 | 21.00 | 40.50 | | 12.00 | 20.75 | 32.75 | | 13.50 | 11.00 | 24.50 | | 2.50 | 19.00 | 21.50 | | 24.250 | | 47.50 | | 71.75 | | ~~143.500~~ | 85 | 251.250 | 1364.875 |
| 8 | Netherlands | Totals: | | | 244.75 | | | | 250.50 | | | | 251.25 | | | | 228.50 | | 138.625 | | | | | | | | 251.250 | 1364.875 |
| 9 | Luxembourg | Mathias Erang | 13.75 | 18.00 | 31.75 | | 20.25 | 20.00 | 40.25 | | 12.25 | 17.75 | 30.00 | | 15.00 | 23.25 | 38.25 | | 22.375 | | 61.25 | | 79.00 | | ~~162.625~~ | 77 | 222.750 | 1361.00 |
| 9 | Luxembourg | Edouard Grethen | 19.75 | 19.00 | 38.75 | | 21.75 | 20.50 | 42.25 | | 13.00 | 19.50 | 32.50 | | 14.50 | 21.50 | 36.00 | | 23.125 | | 69.00 | | 80.50 | | 172.625 | 70 | 222.750 | 1361.00 |
| 9 | Luxembourg | Mathias Logelin | 19.50 | 20.75 | 40.25 | | 24.50 | 22.50 | 47.00 | | 28.25 | 24.25 | 52.50 | | 23.75 | 24.25 | 48.00 | | 24.625 | | 96.00 | | 91.75 | | 212.375 | 42 | 222.750 | 1361.00 |
| 9 | Luxembourg | Albert Neumann | 13.50 | 7.50 | 21.00 | | 20.00 | 19.75 | 39.75 | | 15.75 | 23.50 | 39.25 | | 15.25 | 21.00 | 36.25 | | 25.625 | | 64.50 | | 71.75 | | ~~161.875~~ | 80 | 222.750 | 1361.00 |
| 9 | Luxembourg | Nic Roeser | 25.25 | 22.75 | 48.00 | | 24.75 | 22.75 | 47.50 | | 23.00 | 24.50 | 47.50 | | 16.75 | 23.25 | 40.00 | | 26.250 | | 89.75 | | 93.25 | | 209.250 | 49 | 222.750 | 1361.00 |
| 9 | Luxembourg | Josy Staudt | 11.25 | 18.00 | 29.25 | | 23.50 | 21.00 | 44.50 | | 15.25 | 18.75 | 34.00 | | 13.00 | 21.25 | 34.25 | | 24.000 | | 63.00 | | 79.00 | | 166.000 | 74 | 222.750 | 1361.00 |
| 9 | Luxembourg | Jean-Pierre Urbing | 20.50 | 19.50 | 40.00 | | 18.50 | 23.25 | 41.75 | | 17.50 | 22.25 | 39.75 | | 14.00 | 22.00 | 36.00 | | 19.625 | | 70.50 | | 87.00 | | 177.125 | 68 | 222.750 | 1361.00 |
| 9 | Luxembourg | Fränz Zouang | 19.50 | 25.25 | 44.75 | | 24.00 | 22.75 | 46.75 | | 20.75 | 24.25 | 45.00 | | 18.50 | 21.75 | 40.25 | | 24.125 | | 82.75 | | 94.00 | | 200.875 | 55 | 222.750 | 1361.00 |
| 9 | Luxembourg | Totals: | | | 241.00 | | | | 269.75 | | | | 251.25 | | | | 234.50 | | 141.750 | | | | | | | | 222.750 | 1361.00 |
| 10 | Hungary | Imre Erdődy | 12.00 | 0 | 12.00 | | 0 | 19.50 | 19.50 | | Injured | 0 | 0 | | 0 | 0 | 0 | | 0 | | 12.00 | | 19.50 | | ~~31.500~~ | 88 | 233.250 | 1344.750 |
| 10 | Hungary | Rezső Kende | 15.00 | 13.50 | 28.50 | | 25.50 | 23.50 | 49.00 | | 23.75 | 22.00 | 45.75 | | 25.75 | 23.25 | 49.00 | | 25.000 | | 90.00 | | 82.25 | | 197.250 | 57 | 233.250 | 1344.750 |
| 10 | Hungary | Gyula Kunszt | 15.25 | 18.75 | 34.00 | | 20.00 | 22.50 | 42.50 | | 15.50 | 12.00 | 27.50 | | 11.50 | 22.75 | 34.25 | | 23.875 | | 62.25 | | 76.00 | | 162.125 | 78 | 233.250 | 1344.750 |
| 10 | Hungary | Elemér Pászti | 13.25 | 16.50 | 29.75 | | 17.75 | 22.25 | 40.00 | | 14.25 | 20.50 | 34.75 | | 12.00 | 23.75 | 35.75 | | 17.000 | | 57.25 | | 83.00 | | ~~157.250~~ | 84 | 233.250 | 1344.750 |
| 10 | Hungary | István Pelle †† | 24.75 | 26.25 | 51.00 | | 25.25 | 25.00 | 50.25 | | 27.00 | 25.50 | 52.50 | | 25.00 | 26.75 | 51.75 | | 27.000 | | 102.00 | | 103.50 | | 232.500 | 22†† | 233.250 | 1344.750 |
| 10 | Hungary | Miklós Péter | 22.50 | 25.50 | 48.00 | | 23.75 | 21.00 | 44.75 | | 18.50 | 25.75 | 44.25 | | 0.00 | 11.00 | 11.00 | | 25.625 | | 64.75 | | 83.25 | | 173.625 | 69 | 233.250 | 1344.750 |
| 10 | Hungary | József Szalai | 10.50 | 19.50 | 30.00 | | 19.25 | 19.75 | 39.00 | | 21.50 | 23.50 | 45.00 | | 18.75 | 23.75 | 42.50 | | 22.375 | | 70.00 | | 86.50 | | 178.875 | 67 | 233.250 | 1344.750 |
| 10 | Hungary | Géza Tóth | 18.50 | 21.75 | 40.25 | | 19.25 | 17.00 | 36.25 | | 8.00 | 18.25 | 26.25 | | 20.75 | 21.75 | 42.50 | | 21.875 | | 66.50 | | 78.75 | | 167.125 | 73 | 233.250 | 1344.750 |
| 10 | Hungary | Totals: | | | 231.75 | | | | 261.75 | | | | 241.25 | | | | 231.00 | | 145.750 | | | | | | | | 233.250 | 1344.750 |
| 11 | Great Britain | Bert Cronin | 18.50 | 23.75 | 42.25 | | 20.50 | 18.75 | 39.25 | | 15.00 | 21.75 | 36.75 | | 9.00 | 21.50 | 30.50 | | 14.750 | | 63.00 | | 85.75 | | 163.500 | 76 | 209.000 | 1205.000 |
| 11 | Great Britain | Henry Finchett | 19.25 | 21.50 | 40.75 | | 16.25 | 18.00 | 34.25 | | 17.00 | 20.50 | 37.50 | | 9.25 | 20.50 | 29.75 | | 16.250 | | 1.75 | | 80.50 | | ~~158.500~~ | 83 | 209.000 | 1205.000 |
| 11 | Great Britain | Samuel Humphreys | 14.50 | 19.50 | 34.00 | | 16.00 | 17.75 | 33.75 | | 23.75 | 21.75 | 45.50 | | Injured | 0 | 0 | | 0 | | 54.25 | | 59.00 | | ~~113.250~~ | 86 | 209.000 | 1205.000 |
| 11 | Great Britain | T.B. Parkinson | 14.00 | 19.50 | 33.50 | | 15.50 | 19.00 | 34.50 | | 20.00 | 22.75 | 42.75 | | 13.50 | 19.00 | 32.50 | | 17.375 | | 63.00 | | 80.25 | | 160.625 | 81 | 209.000 | 1205.000 |
| 11 | Great Britain | Gilbert Raynes | 16.50 | 17.25 | 33.75 | | 13.25 | 18.00 | 31.25 | | 19.75 | 23.00 | 42.75 | | 9.00 | 18.25 | 27.25 | | 24.000 | | 58.50 | | 76.50 | | 159.000 | 82 | 209.000 | 1205.000 |
| 11 | Great Britain | E.A. Walton | 11.00 | 19.50 | 30.50 | | 17.00 | 18.50 | 35.50 | | 22.25 | 22.75 | 45.00 | | 9.50 | 19.00 | 28.50 | | 22.500 | | 59.75 | | 79.75 | | 162.000 | 79 | 209.000 | 1205.000 |
| 11 | Great Britain | E. W. Warren | 19.75 | 19.00 | 38.75 | | 18.50 | 19.75 | 38.25 | | 16.50 | 24.00 | 40.50 | | 9.00 | 13.75 | 22.75 | | 25.375 | | 63.75 | | 76.50 | | 165.625 | 75 | 209.000 | 1205.000 |
| 11 | Great Britain | Arthur Whitford | 14.00 | 24.00 | 38.00 | | 20.25 | 21.25 | 41.50 | | 22.00 | 21.75 | 43.75 | | 15.25 | 23.25 | 38.50 | | 23.500 | | 71.50 | | 90.25 | | 185.250 | 63 | 209.000 | 1205.000 |
| 11 | Great Britain | Totals: | | | 216.75 | | | | 220.25 | | | | 251.50 | | | | 180.00 | | 127.500 | | | | | | | | 209.000 | 1205.000 |

General notes:

All of the scores of the 2 lowest overall scoring gymnasts from each team were dropped from the team's overall scores.

Two different vaults were performed, however they were reported as one score, so in the table above, the vault score is included neither with the compulsory nor voluntary totals nor those respective rankings for the individual gymnasts.

Competitors are listed above in the same order that they were listed in the team results in the Official Olympic Report, for the sake of easier fact-checking.

Footnotes:

† = As previously noted, there is an apparent computational error relevant to the bronze medal on the rings apparatus. The compulsory and voluntary scores, on this apparatus, of 4th place finisher (and eventual Olympic All-Around Champion from 1932), Romeo Neri of Italy, were reported in the team contest report as being 28.25 and 27.75, respectively, for a total of 56.00. The compulsory and voluntary scores, on this apparatus, of the bronze medalist, eventual repeat World All-Around Bronze Medalist (from 1930 and 1934) and eventual 1930 World Champion on Rings, Emanuel Löffler of Czechoslovakia, were reported in the team contest report as being 27.25 and 28.25, respectively, for a total of 55.50. However, in the Rings individual standings, Löffler's total apparatus score was listed at 56.50, instead of 55.50, which placed him in bronze medal position ahead of Neri whose total apparatus score was reported consistently. As previously noted, "[Löffler’s] score [of 55.50, rather than 56.50] is consistent with the individual all-around and team all-around scores for Löffler and Czechoslovakia", therefore, the overall weight of evidence points to Neri's score as the proper one for the bronze medal position.

†† = There were apparent computation errors for 2 of the 5 individuals who were ranked 19th-23rd in the General Individual Classification (their older terminology for what is now generally referred to as the "all-around"), affecting 4 of the 5 individuals who were ranked 19th-23rd. The scores that were reported for them in the team competition, upon which all other individual standings and individual medal awards were based, were apparently computed inconsistently from the team competition to the General Individual Classification Standings:

- 19th place, from Finland, Martti Uosikkinen's 233.875 points in the team competition were reported in the General Individual Classification as being 231.875, putting him in 23rd place.
- 20th place, from Czechoslovakia, Bedřich Šupčík's scores were reported consistently.
- 21st place, from Italy, Mario Lertora's 232.875 points in the team competition were reported in the General Individual Classification as being 233.375, putting him in 19th place.
- 22nd place, from Hungary, István Pelle's 232.500 points were reported consistently, but the above inconsistencies had him in 21st place.
- 23rd place, from France, André Lemoine's 232.000 points were reported consistently, but the above inconsistencies had him in 22nd place.

††† = Finland's team totals for the first 3 listed (of 5) apparatuses reflect inconsistencies in calculations. Dropping the scores of their two lowest overall scorers, Kalervo Kinos and Birger Stenman, yields 274.500 points on Pommel horse, 306.000 points on Rings, and 314.500 points on the Horizontal bar, rather than the reported 265.500 points, 303.000 points, and 324.500 points, respectively. However, the overall total point discrepancy between those calculations and those that were reported would not have altered their final team ranking.
