= Birger Stenman =

Swedish footballer (1925–1970)

Personal information
- Full name: Oskar Birger Ferdinand Stenman
- Date of birth: 23 December 1925
- Place of birth: Solna, Sweden
- Date of death: 20 May 1970 (aged 44)
- Place of death: Hägersten, Sweden
- Position: Midfielder

Senior career*
Years	Team	Apps	(Gls)
–1947	Hagalunds IS		
1947–1955	Djurgårdens IF	124	(14)
1956–1958	Mälarhöjdens IK		

International career
1949–1952	Sweden	5	(0)
1949	Sweden B	1	(0)
- * Club domestic league appearances and goals

Oskar Birger Ferdinand Stenman (23 December 1925 in Solna, Sweden — 20 May 1970 in Hägersten, Sweden) was a Swedish footballer who played as a midfielder. He made 119 Allsvenskan appearances for Djurgårdens IF and scored eleven goals.
