= Melchior Wezel =

Swiss gymnast (1903–1989)

- Born: 16 November 1903
- Died: 7 December 1989 (aged 86) Locarno, Switzerland

Gymnastics career
- Discipline: Men's artistic gymnastics
- Country represented: Switzerland
- Gym: Turnverein Töss
Medal record
Men's artistic gymnastics
Representing Switzerland
Olympic Games
Gold medal – first place	1928 Amsterdam	Team
World Championships
Gold medal – first place	1934 Budapest	Team

Melchior Wezel (16 November 1903 – 7 December 1989) was a Swiss gymnast who competed in the 1928 Summer Olympics.

Wezel died in Locarno in 1989, at the age of 86.
