= Otto Pfister (gymnast) =

Swiss gymnast

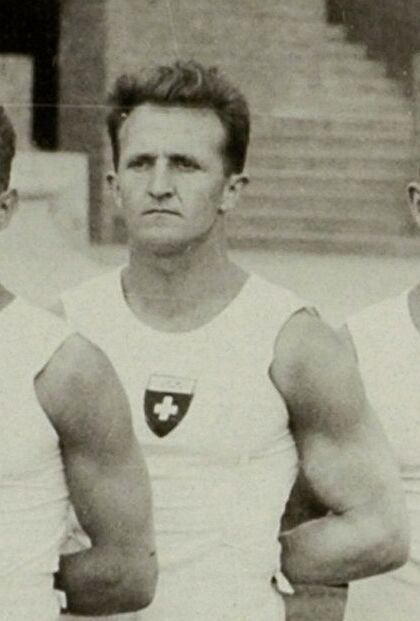
- Pfister at the 1928 Summer Olympics

Personal information
- Born: 3 November 1900

Gymnastics career
- Discipline: Men's artistic gymnastics
- Country represented: Switzerland
Medal record
Men's artistic gymnastics
Representing Switzerland
Olympic Games
Gold medal – first place	1928 Amsterdam	Team
Bronze medal – third place	1924 Paris	Team

Otto Pfister (born 3 November 1900, date of death unknown) was a Swiss gymnast who competed in the 1924 Summer Olympics and in the 1928 Summer Olympics.
