= Anton Malej =

- Антон Малеј
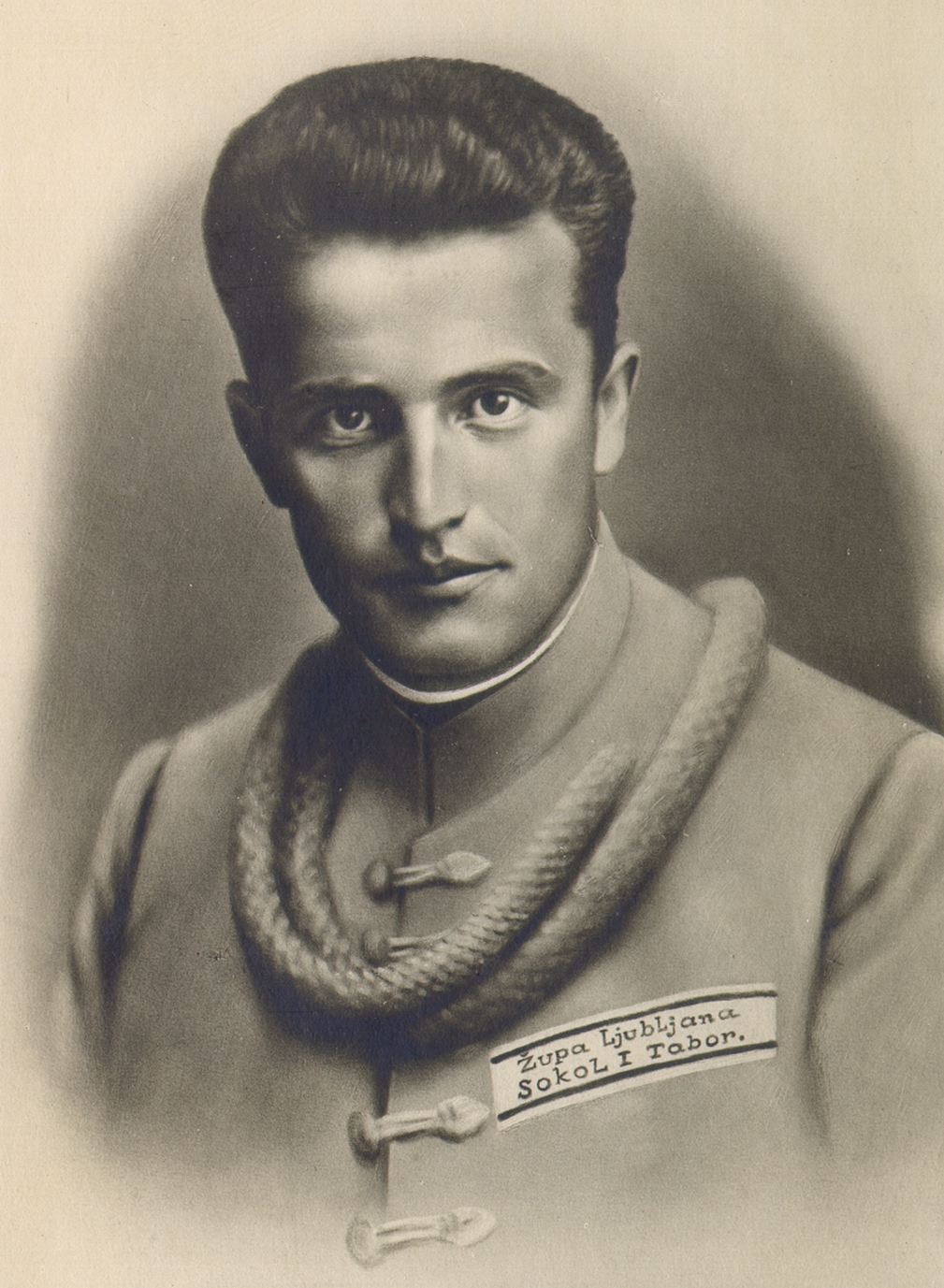

Personal information
- Alternative name: Tone Malej
- Born: 16 January 1907 Savica, Austria-Hungary
- Died: 15 June 1930 (aged 23) Luxembourg City, Luxembourg

Gymnastics career
- Discipline: Men's artistic gymnastics
- Country represented: Kingdom of Serbs, Croats and Slovenes
Medal record
Men's artistic gymnastics
Representing Kingdom of Serbs, Croats and Slovenes
Olympic Games
Bronze medal – third place	1928 Amsterdam	Team

Anton Malej also known as Tone Malej, (16 January 1907 – 15 July 1930) was a Slovenian gymnast, competing for Yugoslavia. He won a bronze medal at the 1928 Summer Olympics.

== Biography ==
Malej was born in Savica pri Srednji vasi in Bohinj. He was the youngest of five children. His parents, Janez and Marija, worked on a farm in Laški Rovt. From 1913 to 1920, Malej attended elementary school in Bohinjska Bistrica. He left for Ljubljana in 1922, to train in an umbrella making workshop, and started working at L. Mikuž in 1926. At the age of 14, Malej joined the Slovenian Sokol athletics movement. Even as a member of the junior team, he already excelled in parallel bars and horizontal bar. He started competing with the member team in 1926.

Malej was a member of the Yugoslavian delegation at the 1928 Summer Olympics in Amsterdam; he won a bronze medal with the men's all-around team, together with Edvard Antosiewicz, Stane Derganc, Dragutin Ciotti, Boris Gregorka, Janez Porenta, Jože Primožič, and Leon Štukelj. In addition, he competed individually in all the men's disciplines. He finished 25th in the individual all-around, 30th on the horse vault, 19th on the parallel bars, 51st on the horizontal bar, 15th on the rings, and 15th on the pommel horse.

In 1929, Malej was in Petrovaradin on military service in the aviation unit. After returning to Ljubljana, he resumed his gymnastic training. He was chosen as a member of the Yugoslavia team competing at the 1930 World Artistic Gymnastics Championships in Luxembourg. The first day of the competition ended tragically for the team: Leon Štukelj slipped when finishing his routine on the horizontal bars, and Malej injured his spine while finishing his routine on the rings. Both were taken to the hospital. Štukelj quickly recovered, though he could not continue with the competition, but the injuries that Malej sustained turned out to be fatal. He died in hospital in Luxembourg on 15 July 1930. Malej's colleague Antosiewicz blamed faulty preparations for the accidents: because of the rain, the competition was moved from a stadium to an indoor gym of a nearby school. An investigation was carried out afterwards and determined that the school's mats were too thin.

Malej's body was brought to Ljubljana on 18 July and he was laid in repose in Tabor Hall, the headquarters of the Ljubljana Sokol organization. Over 10,000 people came to pay their respects. Malej's coffin was taken first to Škofja Loka and then to Bohinjska Bistrica, where he was buried. Later, a bronze bust by renowned sculptor Lojze Dolinar was erected on his tombstone. Since 1970, the annual Malej Memorial competition has been held in Ljubljana. Streets in Ljubljana and Bohinjska Bistrica are also named after Malej.

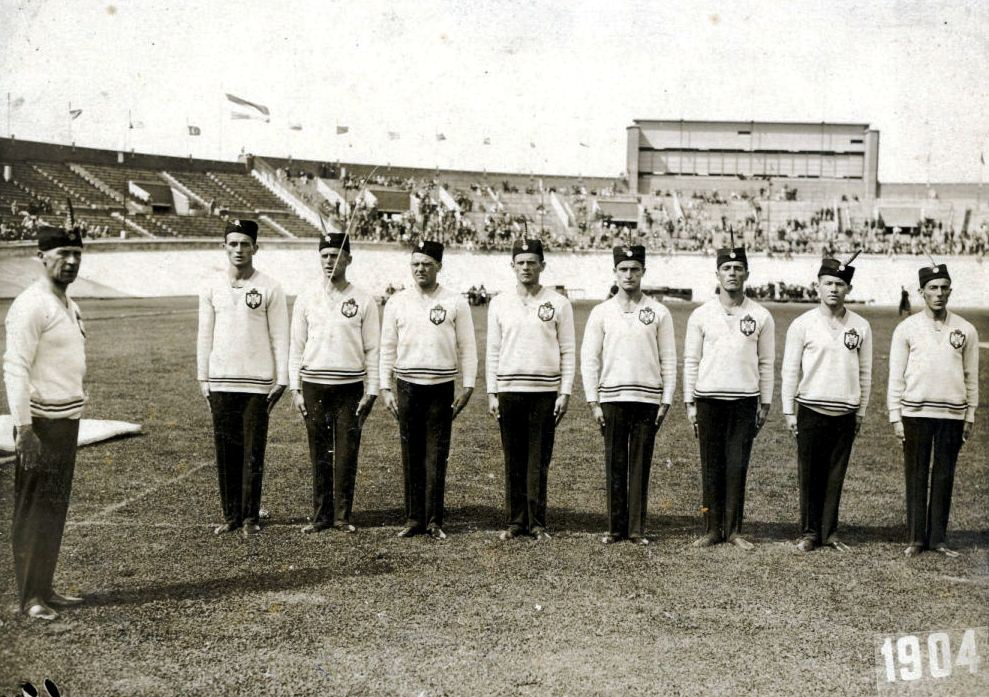
Yugoslav team at the 1928 Summer Olympics. From left to right: Viktor Murnik (coach), Gregorka, Ciotti, Derganc, Primožič, Malej, Porenta, Antosiewicz, and Štukelj.
