= Edouard Grethen =

Luxembourgish gymnast (1903–1981)

- Born: 17 June 1903 Luxembourg City, Luxembourg
- Died: 2 April 1981 (aged 77) Luxembourg City, Luxembourg

Gymnastics career
- Discipline: Men's artistic gymnastics
- Country represented: Luxembourg

Edouard Grethen (17 June 1903 – 2 April 1981) was a Luxembourgish gymnast. He competed in seven events at the 1928 Summer Olympics.
