= Fränz Zouang =

Luxembourgish gymnast (1895–1981)

Fränz Zuang
- Full name: François Zuang
- Born: 2 January 1895 Luxembourg City, Luxembourg
- Died: 4 August 1981 (aged 86) Mondorf-les-Bains, Luxembourg

Gymnastics career
- Discipline: Men's artistic gymnastics
- Country represented: Luxembourg

François "Fränz" Zuang (2 January 1895 – 4 August 1981) was a Luxembourgish gymnast. He competed in seven events at the 1928 Summer Olympics.
