= Janez Porenta =

Yugoslav gymnast

- Јанез Порента
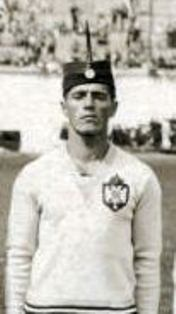

Personal information
- Alternative name: Ivan Porenta
- Born: 3 June 1896 Ljubljana, Austria-Hungary
- Died: 13 June 1942 (aged 46) Ljubljana, Kingdom of Italy

Gymnastics career
- Discipline: Men's artistic gymnastics
- Country represented: Kingdom of Serbs, Croats and Slovenes
Medal record
Men's artistic gymnastics
Representing Kingdom of Serbs, Croats and Slovenes
Olympic Games
Bronze medal – third place	1928 Amsterdam	Team

Janez Porenta also known as Ivan Porenta, (3 June 1896 – 13 June 1942) was a Slovenian gymnast, competing for Yugoslavia. He won a bronze medal at the 1928 Summer Olympics.

== Biography ==
Porenta was born in Ljubljana. He was a member of the Slovenian Sokol athletics movement. With the Yugoslav team, Porenta participated at two Olympic games, at the 1924 Summer Olympics in Paris and in 1928 Summer Olympics in Amsterdam. In Paris, he competed at nine events, his best results being 4th place in men's team competition and 6th place in horse vault. In Amsterdam, where the Yugoslav team won five medals in total, Porenta was a member of the bronze medal winning team at the team competition, together with Edvard Antosiewicz, Stane Derganc, Dragutin Ciotti, Boris Gregorka, Anton Malej, Jože Primožič, and Leon Štukelj.

During the Second World War, Porenta was active in the Liberation Front of the Slovene Nation. In 1942, he was arrested by the forces of Fascist Italy for involvement in the murder of the banker and businessman Avgust Praprotnik (1891–1942) and then shot at the Gramozna Jama ('gravel pit') site in Ljubljana.

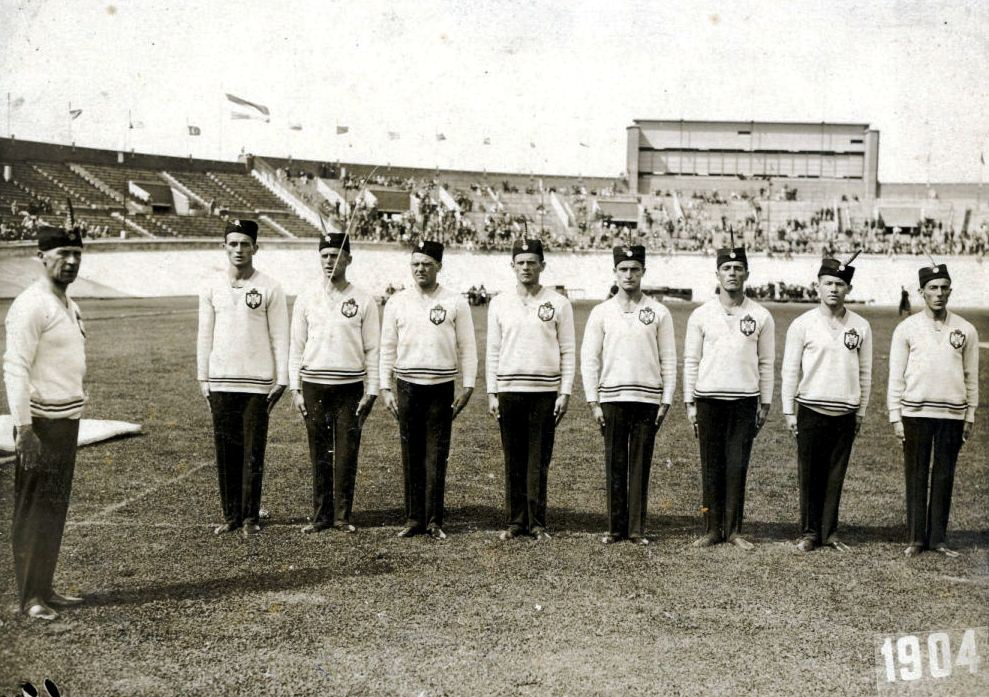
Yugoslav team at the 1928 Summer Olympics. From left to right: Viktor Murnik (coach), Gregorka, Ciotti, Derganc, Primožič, Malej, Porenta, Antosiewicz, and Štukelj.
