= Gyula Kunszt =

Hungarian gymnast (1903–1991)

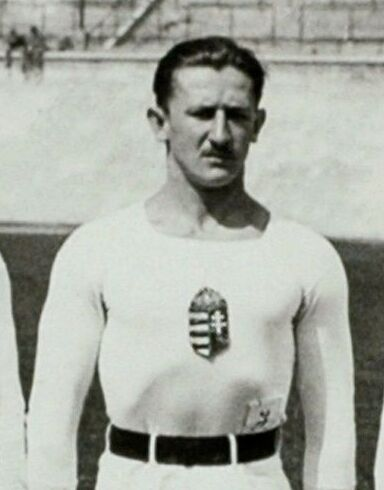
- Kunszt in 1928

Personal information
- Full name: Gyula László Kunszt
- Born: 31 July 1903 Budapest, Austria-Hungary
- Died: 22 December 1991 (aged 88) Budapest, Hungary

Gymnastics career
- Discipline: Men's artistic gymnastics
- Country represented: Hungary
- Club: Budapesti Budai Torna Egylet

Gyula László Kunszt (31 July 1903 – 22 December 1991) was a Hungarian gymnast. He competed in seven events at the 1928 Summer Olympics.
