= Jean-Pierre Urbing =

Luxembourgish gymnast (1899–1975)

- Born: 22 July 1899 Luxembourg City, Luxembourg
- Died: 3 May 1975 (aged 75) Dudelange, Luxembourg

Gymnastics career
- Discipline: Men's artistic gymnastics
- Country represented: Luxembourg

Jean-Pierre Urbing (22 July 1899 – 3 May 1975) was a Luxembourgish gymnast. He competed in seven events at the 1928 Summer Olympics.
