= Boris Gregorka =

Slovenian Olympic gymnast

- Борис Грегорка
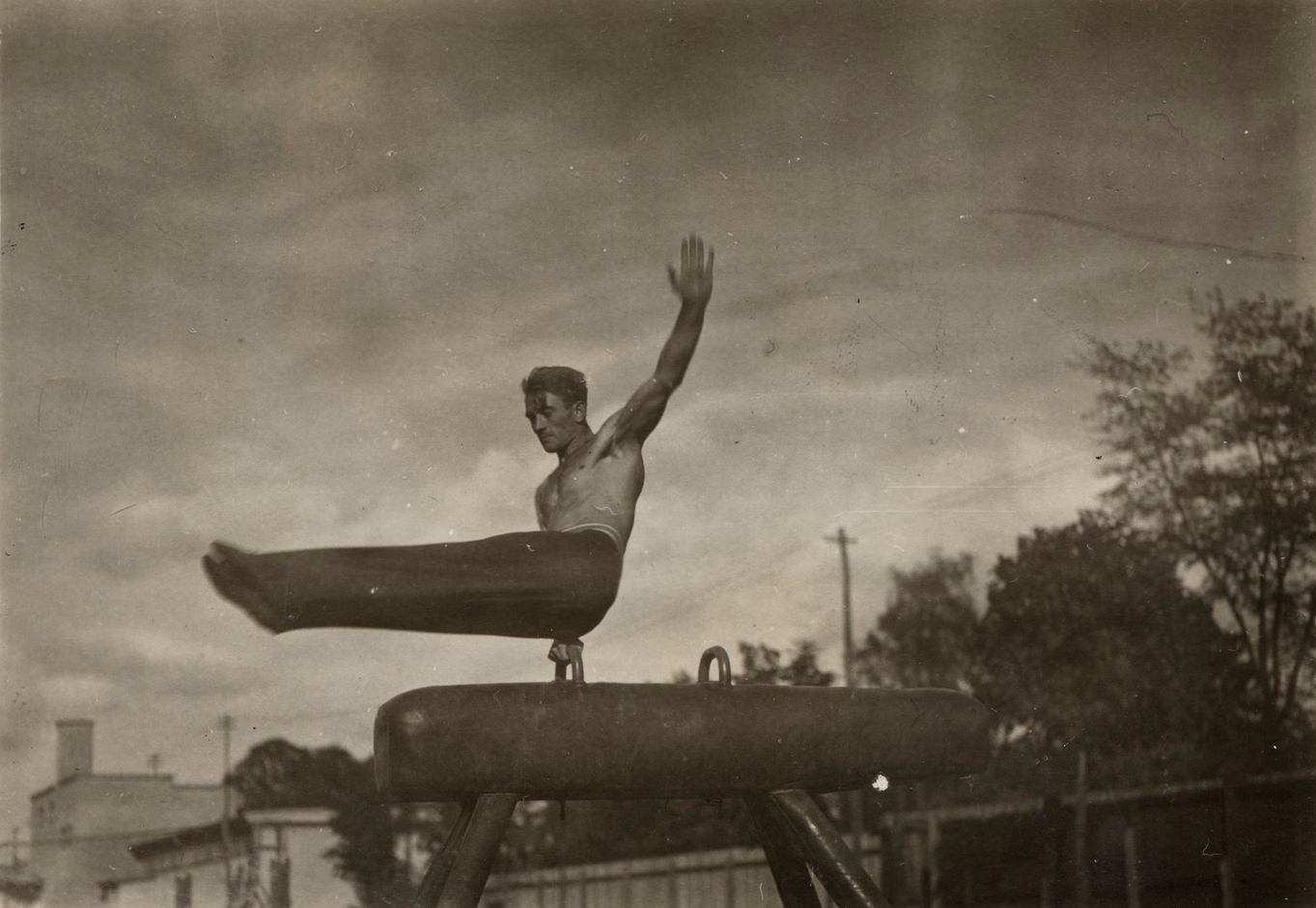

Personal information
- Born: 2 August 1906 Brežice, Austria-Hungary
- Died: 19 March 2001 (aged 94) Ljubljana, Slovenia
- Height: 1.81 m (5 ft 11 in)

Gymnastics career
- Discipline: Men's artistic gymnastics
- Country represented: Yugoslavia
- Club: Ljubljanski Sokol
Medal record
Men's artistic gymnastics
Representing Kingdom of Serbs, Croats and Slovenes
Olympic Games
Bronze medal – third place	1928 Amsterdam	Team

Boris Gregorka (2 August 1906 – 19 March 2001) was a Slovenian gymnast, competing for Yugoslavia. He won a bronze medal at the 1928 Summer Olympics. After retiring from competitive career, he was the coach of a double Olympic gold medallist Miroslav Cerar.

== Biography ==
Gregorka was born in Brežice. At the age of seven, his parents introduced him to the Sokol athletics movement in Ljubljana, where he later achieved several successes. Gregorka was rather tall for a gymnast, 181 cm. This made him best-suited for pommel horse, which was also his best discipline. With his Sokol team, Gregorka was the team winner in all five national competitions for "The Sword of King Alexander" award.

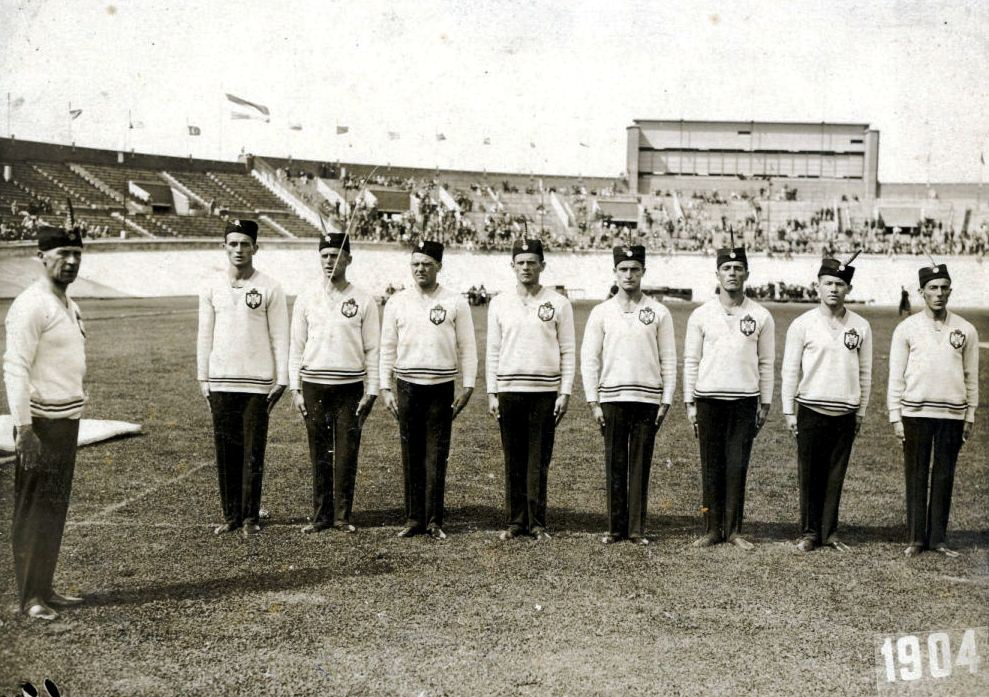
Yugoslav team at the 1928 Summer Olympics. From left to right: Viktor Murnik (coach), Gregorka, Ciotti, Derganc, Primožič, Malej, Porenta, Antosiewicz, and Štukelj.

Gregorka competed at two Olympics. He was a member of the Yugoslavian delegation at the 1928 Summer Olympics in Amsterdam; he won a bronze medal with the men's all-around team, together with Edvard Antosiewicz, Dragutin Ciotti, Stane Derganc, Anton Malej, Janez Porenta, Jože Primožič, and Leon Štukelj. In addition, he competed individually in all the men's disciplines. He finished 21st in the individual all-around, 37th on the horse vault, 34th on the parallel bars, 38th on the horizontal bar, 37th on the rings, and 41st on the pommel horse. Yugoslavia did not send a gymnastic team to the 1932 Summer Olympics in Los Angeles but Gregorka again participated at the 1936 Summer Olympics in Berlin. There, he finished 78th in the individual all-around, 6th in the team all-around, 90th in the floor exercise, 50th on the horse vault, 86th on the parallel bars, 68th on the horizontal bar, 80th on the rings, and 62nd on the pommel horse.

In addition to Olympic appearances, Gregorka competed at three World Artistic Gymnastics Championships. At the 1930 World Artistic Gymnastics Championships in Luxembourg, Gregorka was a member of the all-around team that won a bronze medal, together with Antosiewicz, Malej, Primožič, Štukelj, Rafael Ban, Peter Šumi, and Stane Žilič. The competition was marked by the fatal accident of Malej after his routine on rings. At the 1938 World Artistic Gymnastics Championships in Prague, Gregorka was again a member of the bronze medal-winning team at the all-around team event, together with Primožič, Stjepan Boltižar, Miroslav Forte, Josip Kujundžić, Janez Pristov, Miloš Skrbinšek, and Josip Vadnav.

In addition to gymnastics, Gregorka was active in other sports as well. Several times, he became the national champion in pole vault and broke three national records. In winter, Gregorka practiced ice skating, Alpine skiing, cross-country skiing, and ski jumping. After winning a skiing competition in Krvavec, Gregorka received a medal carved out of a fresh potato.

Gregorka started coaching junior teams at Sokol already in the late 1920s but fully committed to the coaching career after World War II. Sokol was disbanded and reorganized as "Partizan Narodni dom". Gregorka adhered to the principles of his former coach Viktor Murnik. He led the national team at several European and World Championships and at the Olympics. He was the coach of Miroslav Cerar who won three Olympic medals, including two gold in pommel horse at the games in Tokyo and Mexico City. In addition, Gregorka was a sport referee and served as a member of organization committees for several competitions, including the 1970 World Artistic Gymnastics Championships that took place in Ljubljana. He also published several works related to gymnastics and worked as a counselor to the sports equipment manufacturer Elan.

For his achievements both as a sportsman and as a coach, Gregorka received several decorations. Among those were the Bloudek Award in 1967 and the Silver Order of Freedom of the Republic of Slovenia. Following the death of Leon Štukelj, Gregorka briefly became the oldest living Slovenian Olympian. He died in Ljubljana, at the age of 94.
