= Edvard Antosiewicz =

Yugoslav gymnast (1902–1961)

- Едвард Антосијевич
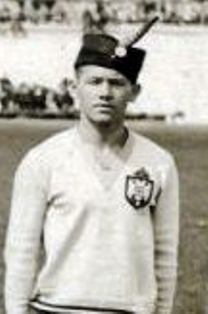
- Antosiewicz at the 1928 Summer Olympics

Personal information
- Alternative names: Edvard Antonijevič, Edward Antosiewicz
- Born: 24 December 1902 Ljubljana, Austria-Hungary
- Died: 4 January 1960 (aged 57) Hot Springs, Arkansas, US

Gymnastics career
- Discipline: Men's artistic gymnastics
- Country represented: Kingdom of Serbs, Croats and Slovenes
Medal record
Men's artistic gymnastics
Representing Kingdom of Serbs, Croats and Slovenes
Olympic Games
Bronze medal – third place	1928 Amsterdam	Team

Edvard Antosiewicz (24 December 1902 – 4 January 1961) was a Slovenian gymnast, competing for Yugoslavia.

Antosiewicz was born in Ljubljana. From an early age, he was an active member of the Slovenian Sokol athletics movement. He represented Yugoslavia at the 1928 Summer Olympics in Amsterdam, Netherlands; he won a bronze medal with the men's all-around team, together with Stane Derganc, Dragutin Ciotti, Boris Gregorka, Anton Malej, Janez Porenta, Jože Primožič, and Leon Štukelj. In addition, he competed individually in all the men's disciplines. He finished 26th in individual all-around, 21st in horse vault, 38th in parallel bars, 36th in horizontal bar, 11th in rings, and 36th in pommel horse.

In the years following, Antosiewicz participated at the 1930 World Artistic Gymnastics Championships in Luxembourg, where he won 3rd place with the Yugoslavia team and finished 15th in individual all-around. Antosiewicz's colleague Anton Malej suffered a fatal injury at that competition after falling at the end of his routine on rings. Yugoslavia did not participate at the 1932 Summer Olympics and also missed the 1934 World Artistic Gymnastics Championships because of political tensions with Hungary. Antosiewicz entered the national trials for the 1936 Summer Olympics in Berlin but was outperformed by younger gymnasts and did not earn a place in the national team. Nevertheless, he went to Berlin as a sport referee and was a referee at the horse vault competition.

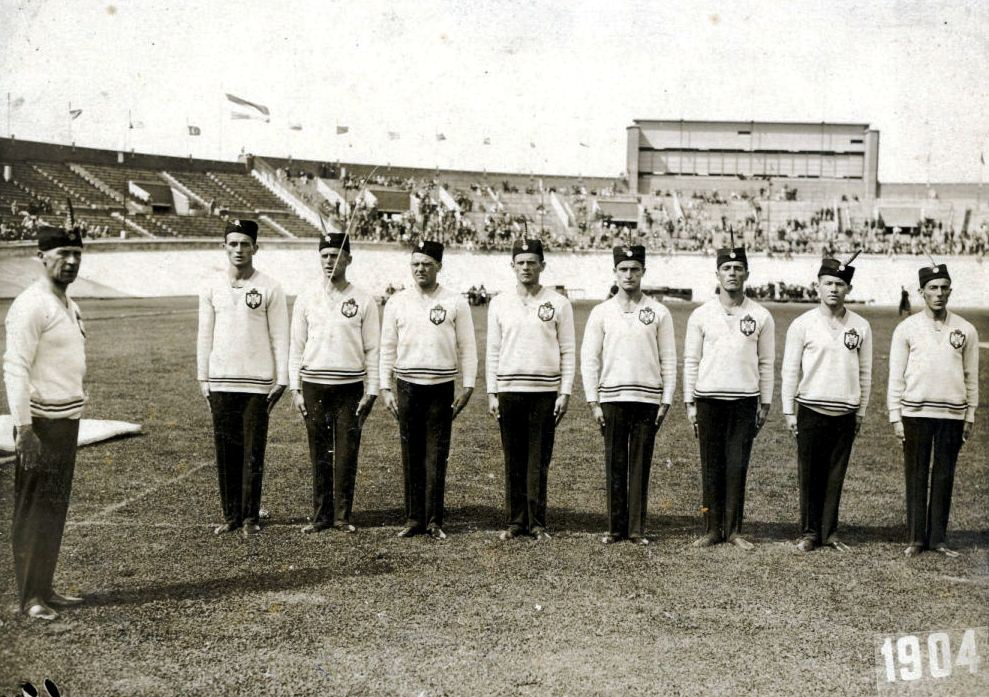
Yugoslav team at the 1928 Summer Olympics. From left to right: Viktor Murnik (coach), Gregorka, Ciotti, Derganc, Primožič, Malej, Porenta, Antosiewicz, and Štukelj.

During the Second World War, Antosiewicz remained active in the Sokol movement. In the last years of the war, he was imprisoned in Ljubljana and then sent to Dachau concentration camp. At the end of the war, he was rescued by American forces. After having recovered, he lived and worked in Munich, Kobarid, and Trieste. In Trieste, his daughter met and married an American doctor and moved with him to Arkansas, United States. Antosiewicz followed them with his wife and son Andre in 1949. He died in Hot Springs, Arkansas, in 1961 and is buried in Jonesboro.
