= André Chatelain =

French gymnast (1902–1968)

- Chatelain with the 1928 French Olympic gymnastics team

Personal information
- Full name: André Jules Chatelain
- Alternative name: Antoine Chatelaine
- Born: 31 March 1902 Bethoncourt, France
- Died: 14 January 1968 (aged 65) Villeurbanne, France

Gymnastics career
- Discipline: Men's artistic gymnastics
- Country represented: France
- Club: Patriotes Seloncourtois

André Jules Chatelain (31 March 1902 – 14 January 1968) was a French gymnast. He competed in seven events at the 1928 Summer Olympics.
