= Dragutin Ciotti =

Croatian gymnast (1905–1974)

- Драгутин Циоти
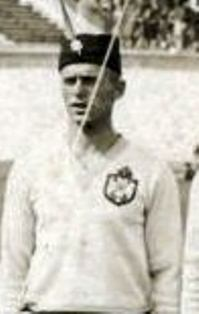
- Ciotti in 1928

Personal information
- Born: 19 October 1905 Sušak, Austria-Hungary
- Died: 17 March 1974 (aged 68) Rijeka, SFR Yugoslavia

Gymnastics career
- Discipline: Men's artistic gymnastics
- Country represented: (Socialist Federal Republic of Yugoslavia) Yugoslavia
Medal record
Men's artistic gymnastics
Representing (Kingdom of Yugoslavia) Kingdom of Serbs, Croats and Slovenes
Olympic Games
Bronze medal – third place	1928 Amsterdam	Team

Dragutin Ciotti (19 October 1905 – 17 March 1974) was a Croatian gymnast. He competed in the men's team and won the bronze medal at the 1928 Summer Olympics.

The son of a teacher Giuseppe Ciotti, Italian by nationality and Albina Ciotti, née Blečić. After the turbulent years spent in Rijeka, post First World War, the family moved to the State of Slovenes.

He was a big fan of the gym and trained in the Croatian "Sokol" sports society. He was the seventh of ten children.

He managed to get into the national team, then one of the three strongest win the world. He was one of the few of the Croats at the time. There he represented the Kingdom of Yugoslavia. He was a member of society "Sokol Sušak Rijeka".

After his sports career, he worked for the forest-wood industry: «Jugodrvo», «Transjug», «Exportdrvo». Until the end of life kept in touch with acquaintances athletes.
