= Stane Derganc =

Yugoslavia gymnast

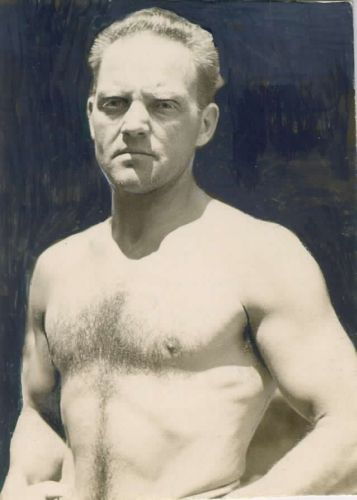
- Stane Dergance in the 1930s

Personal information
- Born: 23 April 1893 Ljubljana, Austria-Hungary
- Died: 9 August 1981 (aged 88)

Gymnastics career
- Discipline: Men's artistic gymnastics
- Country represented: Yugoslavia
Medal record
Representing Kingdom of Serbs, Croats and Slovenes
Olympic Games
Men's gymnastics
Bronze medal – third place	1928 Amsterdam	Horse vault
Bronze medal – third place	1928 Amsterdam	Team competition
World Championships
Gold medal – first place	1922 Ljubljana	Team
Silver medal – second place	1922 Ljubljana	Parallel bars

Stane Derganc (23 April 1893 – 9 August 1981) was a Yugoslav gymnast. At the 1928 Olympics, he won two bronze medals for the Kingdom of Serbs, Croats and Slovenes (one with team). Today, he is also remembered as the model for the man depicted on the Verigar stamps, the first stamp series in Slovene.

Stane Derganc was born in Ljubljana. He took part in two Olympic Games for Yugoslavia, and two gymnastics World Championships. At the 1924 Olympics in Paris, he came in fourth place in the individual combined event, and fifth in the floor event, and seventh in the pommel horse were his best results in the individual apparatus. At the next event, in 1928 he took bronze in the team event and individual floor event.

At the World Championships, he won many medals. At his first World Championships, in 1922 in Yugoslavia, he was part of the Yugoslav team which took silver in the team event, behind Czechoslovakia. He also took bronze in the individual overall event, and silver in the horizontal bar. He also took part in the next World Championships, in Lyon, France in 1926. There, Yugoslavia again won silver in the team event. He won no individual medals at this World Championships.

== Gallery ==
Stane Derganc was depicted by Ivan Vavpotič on the Verigar stamps from late 1918:

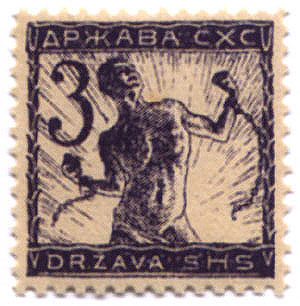
3-heller stamp

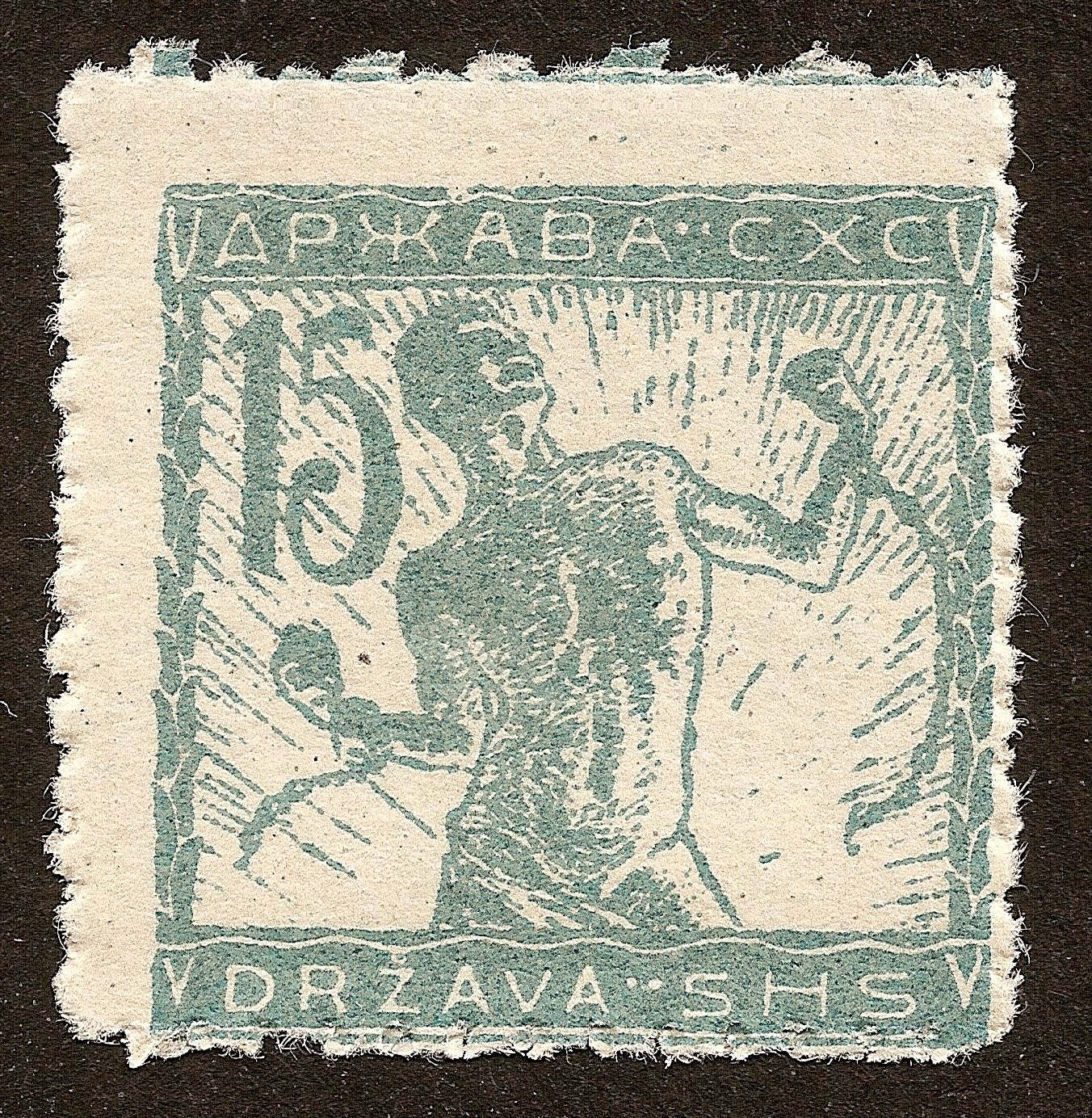
15-heller stamp

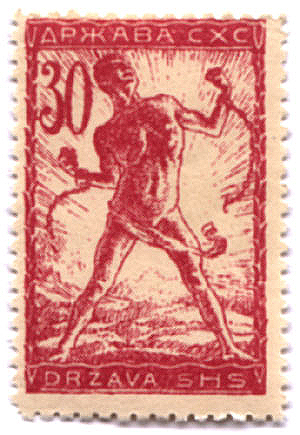
30-heller stamp
