= Gymnastics at the 1928 Summer Olympics – Men's pommel horse =

Olympic gymnastics event

Men's pommel horse at the Games of the IX Olympiad
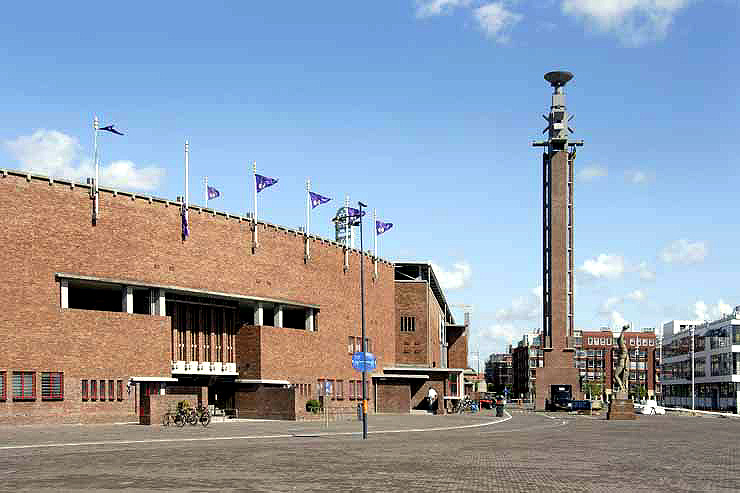
- Olympic Stadium (2008)
- Venue: Olympic Stadium
- Date: 8 August 1928
- Competitors: 88 from 11 nations
- Winning score: 59.25

Medalists
1st place, gold medalist(s)		Hermann Hänggi; Switzerland
2nd place, silver medalist(s)		Georges Miez; Switzerland
3rd place, bronze medalist(s)		Heikki Savolainen; Finland

The men's pommel horse event was part of the gymnastics programme at the 1928 Summer Olympics. It was one of seven gymnastics events for men and it was contested for the fourth time after 1896, 1904, and 1924. The competition was held on Wednesday, August 8, 1928. Eighty-eight gymnasts from eleven nations competed, with each nation having a team of 8 gymnasts. The event was won by Hermann Hänggi of Switzerland, the nation's second consecutive (and third overall) victory in the pommel horse. The Swiss nearly repeated their 1924 medal sweep, with 4 of the top 5, but Finland's Heikki Savolainen took bronze between silver medalist Georges Miez and fourth-place finisher Edi Steinemann. It was Finland's first medal in the event.

== Background ==
This was the fourth appearance of the event, which is one of the five apparatus events held every time there were apparatus events at the Summer Olympics (no apparatus events were held in 1900, 1908, 1912, or 1920). Four of the top 10 gymnasts from 1924 returned: fifth-place finisher Giuseppe Paris of Italy, sixth-place finisher Stane Derganc of Yugoslavia, eighth-place finisher August Güttinger of Switzerland, and tenth-place finisher Leon Štukelj of Yugoslavia. The reigning (1926) world champion, Jan Karafiat of Czechoslovakia, did not compete, but the second- and third-place finishers at the world championships, Jan Gajdos and Ladislav Vácha (both also of Czechoslovakia), did.

The Netherlands made its debut in the men's pommel horse. Hungary competed for the first time since 1896. The other nine nations had all competed in 1924. Switzerland and the United States were each making their third appearance, tied for most of any nation.

== Competition format ==
Each gymnast performed a compulsory exercise and a voluntary exercise. The maximum score for each exercise was 30 points. The pommel horse was one of the apparatus used in the individual and team all-around scores. It accounted for 2/9 of the score.

== Schedule ==
Date	Time	Round
Wednesday, 8 August 1928		Final

== Results ==
Rank	Gymnast	Nation	Total
1st place, gold medalist(s)	Hermann Hänggi	Switzerland	59.25
2nd place, silver medalist(s)	Georges Miez	Switzerland	57.75
3rd place, bronze medalist(s)	Heikki Savolainen	Finland	56.50
4	Edi Steinemann	Switzerland	56.00
5	August Güttinger	Switzerland	55.75
6	Georges Leroux	France	54.75
7	Mauri Nyberg-Noroma	Finland	54.50
7	Melchior Wezel	Switzerland	54.50
9	Eugen Mack	Switzerland	54.25
10	Jan Gajdoš	Czechoslovakia	54.00
10	Josef Effenberger	Czechoslovakia	54.00
12	Leon Štukelj	Yugoslavia	53.25
12	Otto Pfister	Switzerland	53.25
14	Armand Solbach	France	53.00
15	Anton Malej	Yugoslavia	52.50
15	Jean Larrouy	France	52.50
17	Emanuel Löffler	Czechoslovakia	52.00
18	Josip Primožič	Yugoslavia	51.75
19	Bedřich Šupčík	Czechoslovakia	51.50
19	Romeo Neri	Italy	51.50
21	Janez Porenta	Yugoslavia	51.25
21	Mozes Jacobs	Netherlands	51.25
23	István Pelle	Hungary	51.00
24	Jean Gounot	France	50.75
24	Vittorio Lucchetti	Italy	50.75
26	Giuseppe Lupi	Italy	50.50
26	John Pearson	United States	50.50
28	Ferdinando Mandrini	Italy	50.25
28	Hans Grieder	Switzerland	50.25
30	Frank Haubold	United States	50.00
31	Mario Lertora	Italy	49.50
31	Martti Uosikkinen	Finland	49.50
33	Alfred Krauss	France	49.00
34	Étienne Schmitt	France	48.75
34	Stane Derganc	Yugoslavia	48.75
36	Edvard Antonijevič	Yugoslavia	48.50
37	Giuseppe Paris	Italy	48.25
37	Harold Newhart	United States	48.25
39	Miklós Péter	Hungary	48.00
39	Nic Roeser	Luxembourg	48.00
41	André Lemoine	France	47.75
41	Boris Gregorka	Yugoslavia	47.75
43	Frank Kriz	United States	47.50
44	Paul Krempel	United States	47.25
45	Ladislav Vácha	Czechoslovakia	47.00
46	Mario Tambini	Italy	46.75
47	Václav Veselý	Czechoslovakia	46.50
48	Al Jochim	United States	45.75
49	Ladislav Tikal	Czechoslovakia	45.50
50	Ezio Roselli	Italy	45.25
51	Dragutin Cioti	Yugoslavia	44.75
51	Fränz Zouang	Luxembourg	44.75
53	Glenn Berry	United States	44.50
54	Israel Wijnschenk	Netherlands	44.50
55	Herman Witzig	United States	43.50
56	Jan Koutný	Czechoslovakia	42.75
57	Jaakko Kunnas	Finland	42.25
57	Bart Cronin	Great Britain	42.25
59	Pieter van Dam	Netherlands	41.25
60	Henry Finchett	Great Britain	40.75
61	Hugo Licher	Netherlands	40.50
62	Géza Tóth	Hungary	40.25
62	Mathias Logelin	Luxembourg	40.25
64	Jean-Pierre Urbing	Luxembourg	40.00
65	Edouard Grethen	Luxembourg	38.75
65	Ted Warren	Great Britain	38.75
65	Elias Melkman	Netherlands	38.75
68	Antoine Chatelaine	France	38.00
68	Arthur Whitford	Great Britain	38.00
70	Willibrordus Pouw	Netherlands	37.50
71	Urho Korhonen	Finland	36.75
72	Rafael Ylönen	Finland	35.00
73	Gyula Kunszt	Hungary	34.00
73	Samuel Humphreys	Great Britain	34.00
75	G. C. Raynes	Great Britain	33.75
76	T. B. Parkinson	Great Britain	33.50
77	Klaas Boot	Netherlands	33.00
78	Jacobus van der Vinden	Netherlands	32.00
79	Mathias Erang	Luxembourg	31.75
80	E. A. Walton	Great Britain	30.50
81	József Szalai	Hungary	30.00
82	Elemér Pászti	Hungary	29.75
83	Josy Staudt	Luxembourg	29.25
84	Rezső Kende	Hungary	28.50
85	Kalervo Kinos	Finland	27.00
86	Albert Neumann	Luxembourg	21.00
87	Birger Stenman	Finland	20.25
—	Imre Erdődy	Hungary	DNF
