= Gymnastics at the 1928 Summer Olympics – Men's horizontal bar =

Olympic gymnastics event

Men's horizontal bar at the Games of the IX Olympiad
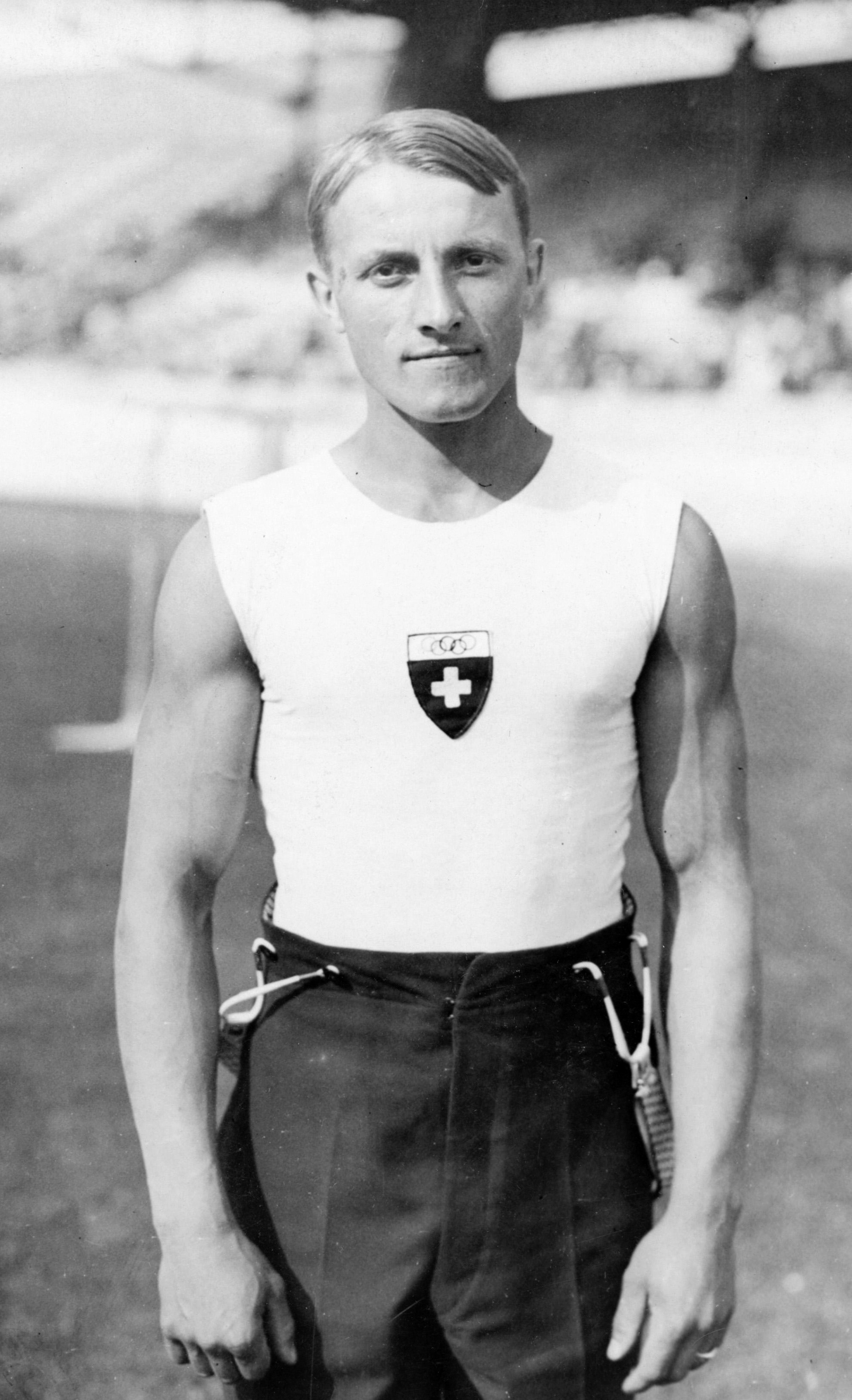
- Georges Miez
- Venue: Olympic Stadium
- Date: 9 August 1928
- Competitors: 86 from 11 nations
- Winning score: 57.50

Medalists
1st place, gold medalist(s)		Georges Miez; Switzerland
2nd place, silver medalist(s)		Romeo Neri; Italy
3rd place, bronze medalist(s)		Eugen Mack; Switzerland

The men's horizontal bar event was part of the gymnastics programme at the 1928 Summer Olympics. It was one of seven gymnastics events for men and it was contested for the fourth time after 1896, 1904, and 1924. Scores from the horizontal bar event were added to the results from other individual apparatus events to give aggregate scores for the individual and team all-around events. There were 86 gymnasts from 11 nations, with each nation having a team of up to 8 gymnasts. The event was won by Georges Miez of Switzerland, the nation's first victory in the men's horizontal bar. The silver medal went to Romeo Neri of Italy (the nation's first medal in the event), with Eugen Mack of Switzerland earning bronze.

== Background ==
This was the fourth appearance of the event, which is one of the five apparatus events held every time there were apparatus events at the Summer Olympics (no apparatus events were held in 1900, 1908, 1912, or 1920). Four of the top 10 gymnasts from 1924 returned: gold medalist Leon Štukelj of Yugoslavia, fifth-place finisher Georges Miez of Switzerland, sixth-place finisher Jean Gounot of France, and eighth-place finisher August Güttinger of Switzerland. Štukelj was also the two-time reigning (1922 and 1926) world champion.

The Netherlands made its debut in the men's parallel bars. Hungary competed for the first time since 1896. The other nine nations had all competed in 1924. Switzerland and the United States each made their third appearance, tied for most of any nation.

== Competition format ==
Each gymnast performed a compulsory exercise and a voluntary exercise. The maximum score for each exercise was 30 points. The horizontal bar was one of the apparatus used in the individual and team all-around scores. It accounted for 2/9 of the score.

== Schedule ==
Date	Time	Round
Thursday, 9 August 1928		Final

== Results ==
Source: Official results; De Wael

Rank	Gymnast	Nation	Score
1st place, gold medalist(s)	Georges Miez	Switzerland	57.50
2nd place, silver medalist(s)	Romeo Neri	Italy	57.00
3rd place, bronze medalist(s)	Eugen Mack	Switzerland	56.75
4	Hermann Hänggi	Switzerland	56.50
4	Vittorio Lucchetti	Italy	56.50
6	Josip Primožič	Yugoslavia	56.00
7	Hans Grieder	Switzerland	55.75
7	August Güttinger	Switzerland	55.75
9	Josef Effenberger	Czechoslovakia	55.50
9	Armand Solbach	France	55.50
11	Ferdinando Mandrini	Italy	55.25
12	Ladislav Vácha	Czechoslovakia	54.75
13	Heikki Savolainen	Finland	54.50
14	Jean Gounot	France	54.25
14	Bedřich Šupčík	Czechoslovakia	54.25
16	André Lemoine	France	54.00
16	Emanuel Löffler	Czechoslovakia	54.00
16	Giuseppe Lupi	Italy	54.00
16	Mauri Nyberg-Noroma	Finland	54.00
16	Martti Uosikkinen	Finland	54.00
21	Mario Lertora	Italy	53.75
21	Edi Steinemann	Switzerland	53.75
21	Leon Štukelj	Yugoslavia	53.75
21	Melchior Wezel	Switzerland	53.75
25	Georges Leroux	France	53.25
25	Otto Pfister	Switzerland	53.25
27	Frank Kriz	United States	53.00
28	Mathias Logelin	Luxembourg	52.50
28	István Pelle	Hungary	52.50
28	Mario Tambini	Italy	52.50
31	Jan Koutný	Czechoslovakia	52.25
32	Václav Veselý	Czechoslovakia	52.00
33	Jan Gajdoš	Czechoslovakia	51.25
33	Urho Korhonen	Finland	51.25
33	Jaakko Kunnas	Finland	51.25
36	Edvard Antonijevič	Yugoslavia	51.00
37	Jean Larrouy	France	50.75
38	Boris Gregorka	Yugoslavia	49.75
39	Elias Melkman	Netherlands	49.50
39	Rafael Ylönen	Finland	49.50
41	Antoine Chatelaine	France	49.25
41	Harold Newhart	United States	49.25
43	Jacobus van der Vinden	Netherlands	48.75
44	Giuseppe Paris	Italy	48.50
45	Glenn Berry	United States	47.50
45	Nic Roeser	Luxembourg	47.50
45	Étienne Schmitt	France	47.50
48	Birger Stenman	Finland	47.25
49	Herman Witzig	United States	47.00
50	Ladislav Tikal	Czechoslovakia	46.75
51	Anton Malej	Yugoslavia	46.00
52	Dragutin Cioti	Yugoslavia	45.75
52	Rezső Kende	Hungary	45.75
54	Samuel Humphreys	Great Britain	45.50
55	Kalervo Kinos	Finland	45.25
55	Frank Haubold	United States	45.25
57	John Pearson	United States	45.00
57	József Szalai	Hungary	45.00
57	E. A. Walton	Great Britain	45.00
57	Fränz Zouang	Luxembourg	45.00
61	Miklós Péter	Hungary	44.25
61	Ezio Roselli	Italy	44.25
63	Al Jochim	United States	44.00
64	Arthur Whitford	Great Britain	43.75
65	T. B. Parkinson	Great Britain	42.75
65	G. C. Raynes	Great Britain	42.75
65	Israel Wijnschenk	Netherlands	42.75
68	Willibrordus Pouw	Netherlands	42.50
69	Pieter van Dam	Netherlands	42.00
70	E. W. Warren	Great Britain	40.50
71	Klaas Boot	Netherlands	40.25
71	Paul Krempel	United States	40.25
73	Jean-Pierre Urbing	Luxembourg	39.75
74	Stane Derganc	Yugoslavia	39.50
75	Albert Neumann	Luxembourg	39.25
76	Janez Porenta	Yugoslavia	37.75
77	Henry Finchett	Great Britain	37.50
78	Bart Cronin	Great Britain	36.75
79	Elemér Pászti	Hungary	34.75
80	Josy Staudt	Luxembourg	34.00
81	Edouard Grethen	Luxembourg	32.50
82	Mathias Erang	Luxembourg	30.00
83	Gyula Kunszt	Hungary	27.50
84	Géza Tóth	Hungary	26.25
85	Mozes Jacobs	Netherlands	25.75
86	Hugo Licher	Netherlands	24.50
—	Imre Erdődy	Hungary	DNS
—	Alfred Krauss	France	DNS
