= Gymnastics at the 1928 Summer Olympics – Men's artistic individual all-around =

Olympic gymnastics event

Men's artistic individual all-around at the Games of the IX Olympiad
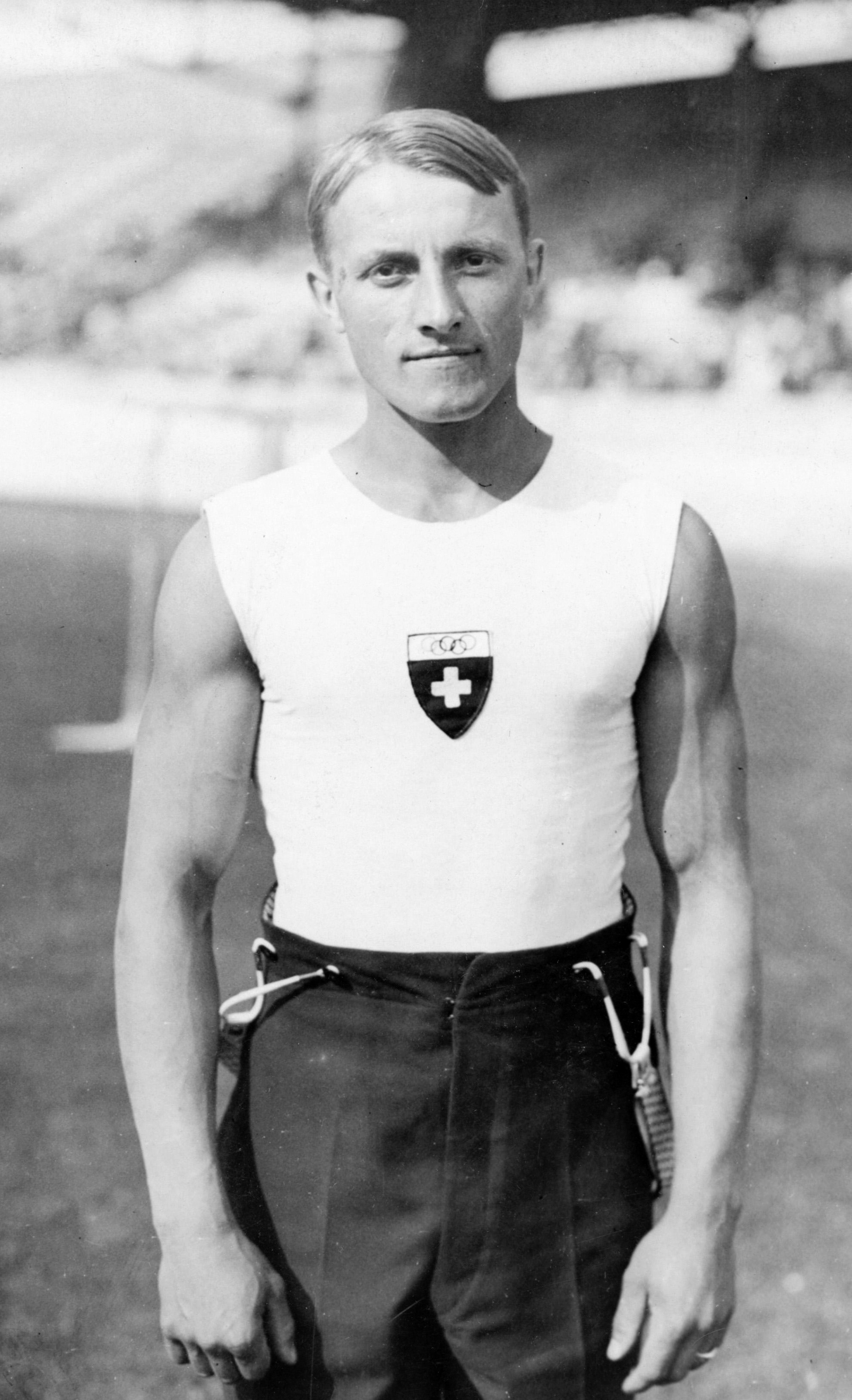
- Gold medalist Georges Miez
- Venue: Olympic Stadium
- Dates: 8–10 August 1928
- Competitors: 88 from 11 nations
- Winning score: 247.500

Medalists
1st place, gold medalist(s)		Georges Miez; Switzerland
2nd place, silver medalist(s)		Hermann Hänggi; Switzerland
3rd place, bronze medalist(s)		Leon Štukelj; Yugoslavia

The men's artistic individual all-around event was part of the gymnastics programme at the 1928 Summer Olympics. It was one of seven gymnastics events for men and was the seventh Olympic men's all-around gymnastic championship. Scores from the individual apparatus events were added to give aggregate scores for the individual all-around; individual all-around scores were similarly summed for the team all-around event. There were 88 competitors from 11 nations. Each nation sent a team of 8 gymnasts. The event was won by Georges Miez of Switzerland, with his countryman Hermann Hänggi taking silver. They were the first medals in the event for Swiss gymnasts since 1904 and the first gold medal ever for a Swiss man in the individual all-around. Defending Olympic champion Leon Štukelj of Yugoslavia finished with the bronze this time, making him the third man to win multiple medals in the event.

== Background ==
This was the seventh appearance of the men's individual all-around. The first individual all-around competition had been held in 1900, after the 1896 competitions featured only individual apparatus events. A men's individual all-around has been held every Games since 1900.

Seven of the top 10 gymnasts from the 1924 Games returned: gold medalist Leon Štukelj of Yugoslavia, bronze medalist Bedřich Šupčík of Czechoslovakia, fourth-place finisher Ferdinando Mandrini of Italy, sixth-place finisher Ladislav Vácha of Czechoslovakia, seventh-place finisher August Güttinger of Switzerland, eighth-place finisher (and 1920 bronze medalist) Jean Gounot of France, and tenth-place finisher Mario Lertora of Italy. Reigning World Champion Peter Šumi of Yugoslavia did not compete in Amsterdam, but second-place finisher Josef Effenberger and third-place finisher Ladislav Vácha, both of Czechoslovakia, did.

For the first time, no nations made their debut in the event. France and Italy each made their sixth appearance, tied for most among nations, both having missed only the 1904 Games in St. Louis.

== Competition format ==
By 1928, the format for the all-around competition had begun to settle after changing widely in the earlier Games. The 1924 Games (roughly following the precedent of 1904) used an aggregate score of the various apparatus events for an individual all-around championship; the 1928 tournament continued with that format. The rope climbing exercise was dropped, however. The 1928 all-around consisted of 10 exercises on 5 apparati. The compulsory and optional exercises for the parallel bars, horizontal bar, rings, and pommel horse were worth from 0 to 30 points each (with each apparatus from 0 to 60), while the compulsory (sidehorse) vault and optional (regular) vault exercises were worth from 0 to 15 points each (with 0 to 30 total for the vault competition). Thus, the total possible all-around score was 270.

== Schedule ==
Date	Time	Round
Wednesday, 8 August 1928		Final
Thursday, 9 August 1928		Final, continued
Friday, 10 August 1928		Final, continued

== Results ==
Source: Official results; De Wael

Rank	Gymnast	Nation	Total
1st place, gold medalist(s)	Georges Miez	Switzerland	247.500
2nd place, silver medalist(s)	Hermann Hänggi	Switzerland	246.625
3rd place, bronze medalist(s)	Leon Štukelj	Yugoslavia	244.875
4	Romeo Neri	Italy	244.750
5	Josip Primožič	Yugoslavia	244.000
6	Mauri Nyberg-Noroma	Finland	243.750
6	Heikki Savolainen	Finland	243.750
8	Eugen Mack	Switzerland	243.250
9	Ladislav Vácha	Czechoslovakia	242.875
10	Emanuel Löffler	Czechoslovakia	242.500
11	Armand Solbach	France	241.625
12	Melchior Wezel	Switzerland	240.875
13	Jan Gajdoš	Czechoslovakia	240.625
14	Josef Effenberger	Czechoslovakia	238.875
15	Edi Steinemann	Switzerland	237.875
16	August Güttinger	Switzerland	237.750
17	Georges Leroux	France	235.750
18	Hans Grieder	Switzerland	234.125
19	Mario Lertora	Italy	233.375
20	Bedřich Šupčík	Czechoslovakia	233.250
21	István Pelle	Hungary	232.500
22	André Lemoine	France	232.000
23	Martti Uosikkinen	Finland	231.875
24	Otto Pfister	Switzerland	230.875
25	Anton Malej	Yugoslavia	228.875
26	Edvard Antonijevič	Yugoslavia	228.000
26	Vittorio Lucchetti	Italy	228.000
28	Václav Veselý	Czechoslovakia	227.625
29	Jean Larrouy	France	226.500
30	Ferdinando Mandrini	Italy	226.250
31	Jan Koutný	Czechoslovakia	225.250
32	Giuseppe Lupi	Italy	224.000
33	Boris Gregorka	Yugoslavia	221.000
34	Janez Porenta	Yugoslavia	220.250
35	Étienne Schmitt	France	219.125
36	Al Jochim	United States	218.250
37	Ladislav Tikal	Czechoslovakia	217.750
38	Jaakko Kunnas	Finland	217.500
39	Jean Gounot	France	216.750
40	Glenn Berry	United States	212.750
41	Mario Tambini	Italy	212.500
42	Mathias Logelin	Luxembourg	212.375
43	Stane Derganc	Yugoslavia	211.875
44	Frank Kriz	United States	211.625
45	Dragutin Cioti	Yugoslavia	210.000
46	Urho Korhonen	Finland	209.875
47	Frank Haubold	United States	209.375
47	Harold Newhart	United States	209.375
49	Nic Roeser	Luxembourg	209.250
50	John Pearson	United States	208.750
51	Herman Witzig	United States	206.250
52	Paul Krempel	United States	203.625
53	Giuseppe Paris	Italy	203.250
54	Antoine Chatelaine	France	202.375
55	Fränz Zouang	Luxembourg	200.875
56	Elias Melkman	Netherlands	199.500
57	Rezső Kende	Hungary	197.250
58	Ezio Roselli	Italy	192.675
59	Pieter van Dam	Netherlands	190.375
60	Mozes Jacobs	Netherlands	190.000
61	Rafael Ylönen	Finland	188.750
62	Kalervo Kinos	Finland	185.375
63	Arthur Whitford	Great Britain	185.250
64	Israel Wijnschenk	Netherlands	182.625
65	Willibrordus Pouw	Netherlands	182.125
66	Birger Stenman	Finland	179.750
67	József Szalai	Hungary	178.875
68	Jean-Pierre Urbing	Luxembourg	177.125
69	Miklós Péter	Hungary	173.625
70	Edouard Grethen	Luxembourg	172.625
71	Klaas Boot	Netherlands	169.000
71	Jacobus van der Vinden	Netherlands	169.000
73	Géza Tóth	Hungary	167.125
74	Josy Staudt	Luxembourg	166.000
75	E. W. Warren	Great Britain	165.625
76	Bart Cronin	Great Britain	163.500
77	Mathias Erang	Luxembourg	162.625
78	Gyula Kunszt	Hungary	162.125
79	E. A. Walton	Great Britain	162.000
80	Albert Neumann	Luxembourg	161.875
81	T. B. Parkinson	Great Britain	160.675
82	G. C. Raynes	Great Britain	159.000
83	Henry Finchett	Great Britain	158.500
84	Elemér Pászti	Hungary	157.250
85	Hugo Licher	Netherlands	143.500
—	Imre Erdődy	Hungary	DNF
—	Samuel Humphreys	Great Britain	DNF
—	Alfred Krauss	France	DNF
