= Netherlands at the World Artistic Gymnastics Championships =

- Flag of the Netherlands
- IOC code: NED
- Medals: Gold 5 Silver 8 Bronze 3 Total 16

Dutch gymnast Hendricus Thijsen competed at the inaugural World Championships in 1903. While there he co-won gold on the pommel horse. At the 1905 World Championships the Dutch men won the silver medal in the team competition. It would be another 96 years before another gymnast won a medal at the World Artistic Gymnastics Championships, with Renske Endel earning a silver medal in 2001.

== Medalists ==
Medal	Name	Year	Event
Gold	Hendricus Thijsen	(Belgium) 1903 Antwerp	Men's pommel horse
Silver	D. de Boer, G.J. Douw, B. Florijn, Dirk Janssen, Jan Janssen, Jan Jacob Kieft, Ferdinand Lambert, J.H. Reder, Johan Schmitt	(France) 1905 Bordeaux	Men's team
Silver	Renske Endel	(Belgium) 2001 Ghent	Women's uneven bars
Silver	Verona van de Leur	(Hungary) 2002 Debrecen	Women's floor exercise
Gold	Yuri van Gelder	(Australia) 2005 Melbourne	Men's rings
Bronze	Suzanne Harmes	(Australia) 2005 Melbourne	Women's floor exercise
Bronze	Yuri van Gelder	(Denmark) 2006 Aarhus	Men's rings
Silver	Yuri van Gelder	(Germany) 2007 Stuttgart	Men's rings
Silver	Epke Zonderland	(United Kingdom) 2009 London	Men's horizontal bar
Silver	Epke Zonderland	(Netherlands) 2010 Rotterdam	Men's horizontal bar
Gold	Epke Zonderland	(Belgium) 2013 Antwerp	Men's horizontal bar
Gold	Epke Zonderland	(China) 2014 Nanning	Men's horizontal bar
Silver	Sanne Wevers	(United Kingdom) 2015 Glasgow	Women's balance beam
Silver	Epke Zonderland	(Canada) 2017 Montreal	Men's horizontal bar
Bronze	Bart Deurloo	(Canada) 2017 Montreal	Men's horizontal bar
Gold	Epke Zonderland	(Qatar) 2018 Doha	Men's horizontal bar

== Medal tables ==
=== By gender ===
Gender	Gold	Silver	Bronze	Total
Men	5	5	2	12
Women	0	3	1	4
