= Frank Rijken =

Dutch artistic gymnast (born 1996)

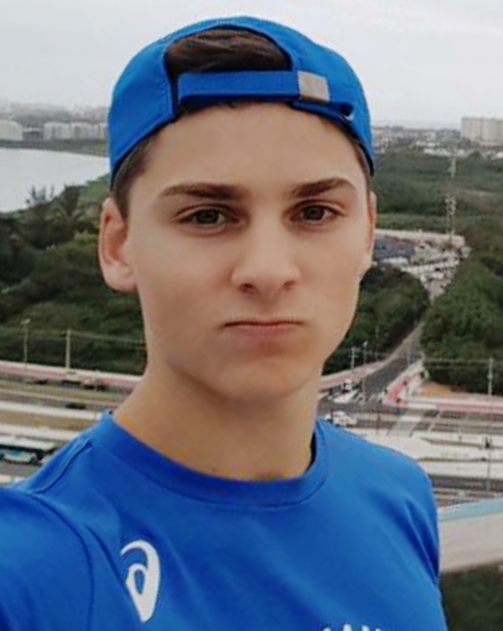
- Rijken in 2016

Personal information
- Born: 24 November 1996 (age 29) Westvoorne, Netherlands
- Height: 1.72 m (5 ft 8 in)

Gymnastics career
- Discipline: Men's artistic gymnastics
- Country represented: Netherlands
- Club: SV PAX Haarlemmermeer
- Head coach: Dirk van Meldert

Frank Rijken (born 24 November 1996) is a Dutch artistic gymnast. He represented the Netherlands at the 2016 and 2024 Summer Olympics.

== Early life ==
Rijken was born on 24 November 1996 in Westvoorne. His older sister, Marlies, competed for the Netherlands at the 2010 and 2011 World Championships before retiring in 2012. He started gymnastics at the age of nine after following his older sister into the sport.

== Gymnastics career ==
Rijken competed at the 2014 Junior European Championships, finishing 18th in the all-around and eighth in the parallel bars final. He began competing in senior competitions in 2015 and represented the Netherlands at the 2015 European Games. The Dutch team of Rijken, Casimir Schmidt, and Bram Verhofstad finished 15th in the team competition. He then helped the Dutch team finish 11th in the qualification round of the 2015 World Championships, allowing them to qualify for the 2016 Olympic Test Event.

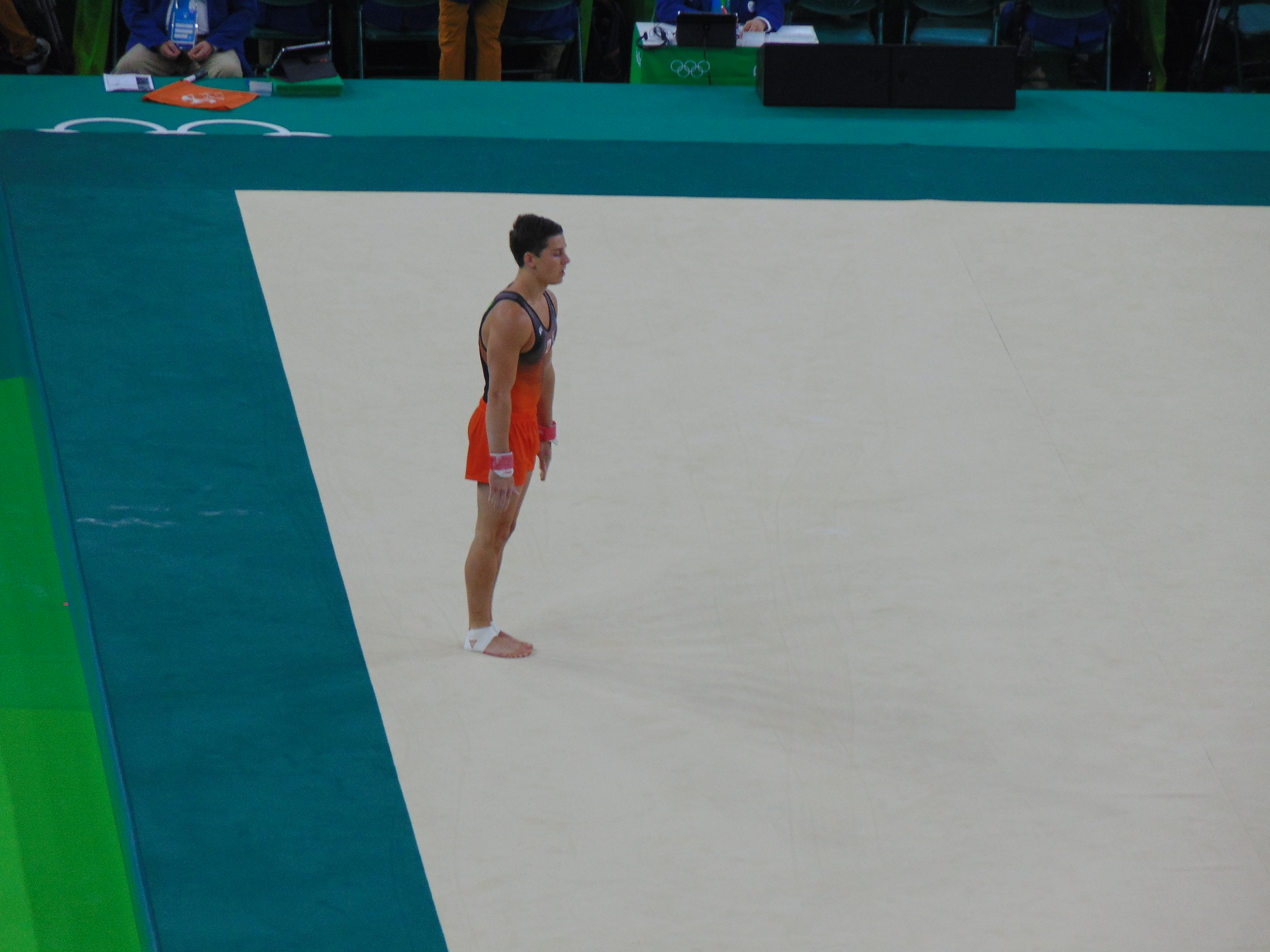
Rijken competing at the 2016 Summer Olympics

Rijken competed with the team at the 2016 Olympic Test Event that won the bronze medal, qualifying them as a full team for the 2016 Summer Olympics. He was then selected to represent the Netherlands at the 2016 Summer Olympics alongside Bart Deurloo, Yuri van Gelder, Jeffrey Wammes, and Epke Zonderland. The team finished 10th during the qualification round.

Rijken tore his meniscus in 2017 and had surgery. He returned to competition in 2018, finishing eighth in the all-around at the Stuttgart World Cup. He then helped the Dutch team finish ninth at the 2018 European Championships, making them the first reserves for the team final. Then at the 2018 World Championships, Rijken and the Dutch team qualified for the team final, finishing eighth.

Rijken competed with the Dutch team that finished 19th at the 2019 World Championships, meaning they did not qualify for the 2020 Olympic Games. He finished sixth in the parallel bars final at the 2020 Melbourne World Cup. He only competed on the pommel horse and parallel bars at the 2021 World Championships but did not advance to either event final.

Rijken took a break from gymnastics following the 2021 World Championships and began working for PwC. He was inspired to return to training after watching the Dutch team clinch an Olympic berth at the 2023 World Championships. He won the silver medal in the all-around at the 2024 Dutch Championships. He was then selected to compete at the 2024 Summer Olympics alongside Jermain Grünberg, Martijn de Veer, Loran de Munck, and Casimir Schmidt. The team finished 10th in the qualification round, making them the second reserves for the team final.

== Personal life ==
In 2021, Rijken graduated from Tilburg University with a degree in business economics, and he graduated with a Master's in Strategy Economics at Erasmus University Rotterdam in 2022. As of 2024, Rijken is in a relationship with fellow Dutch gymnast Elze Geurts. He has worked for PwC since September 2022.
