= Casimir Schmidt =

Dutch artistic gymnast

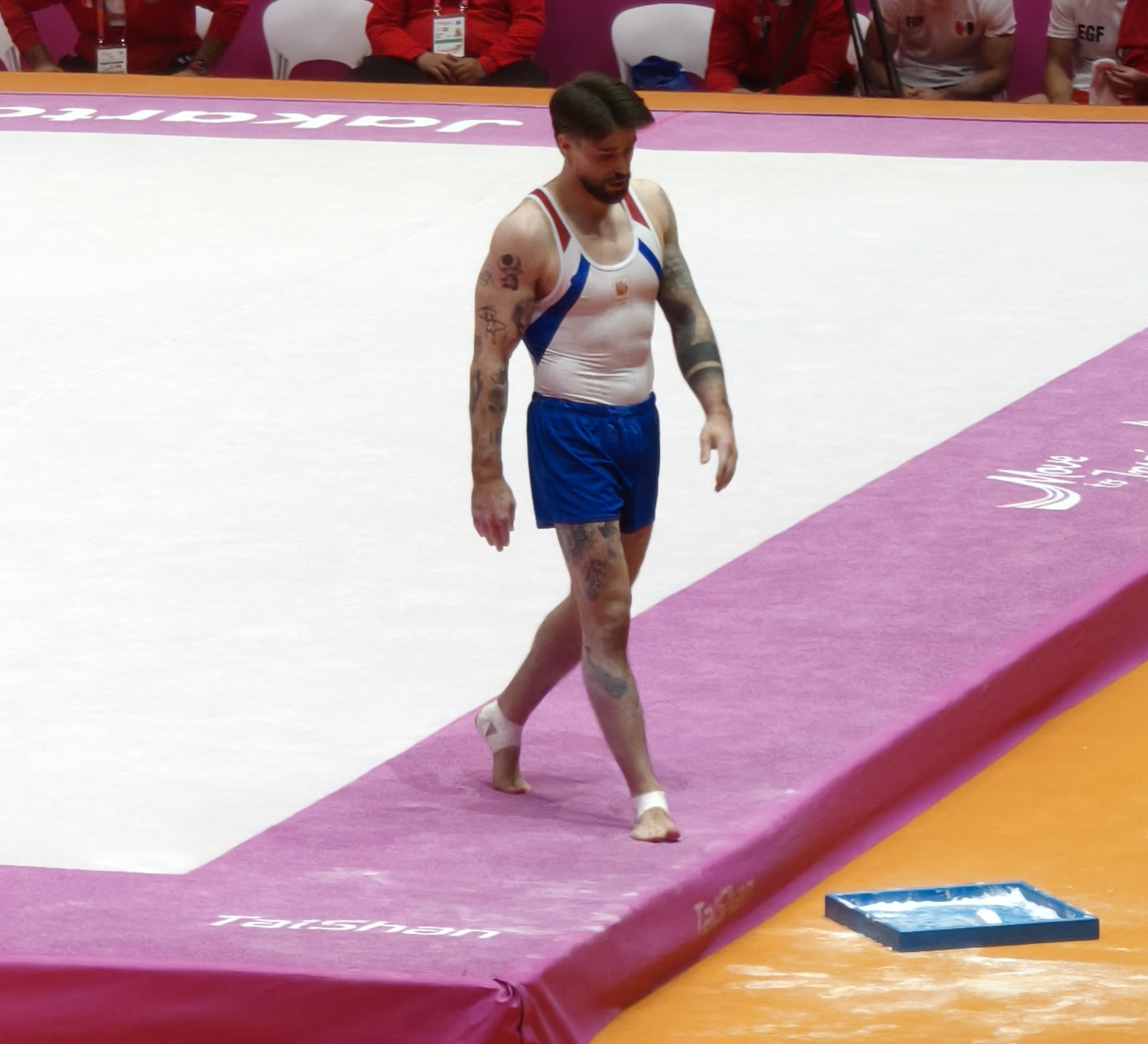
- Schmidt at 2025 World Championships

Personal information
- Nickname: Casi
- Born: 31 October 1995 (age 30) Hoofddorp, Netherlands
- Height: 168 cm (5 ft 6 in)

Gymnastics career
- Discipline: Men's artistic gymnastics
- Country represented: Netherlands; (2012–present)
- Club: SV PAX Haarlemmermeer
- Head coach: Dirk van Meldert
Medal record
Representing Netherlands
European Games
Silver medal – second place	2015 Baku	Vault
FIG World Cup
Event	1st	2nd	3rd
Apparatus World Cup	0	1	1
World Challenge Cup	1	0	2
Total	1	1	3

Casimir Schmidt (born 31 October 1995) is a Dutch artistic gymnast. He won the silver medal on the vault at the 2015 European Games. He is a four-time Dutch national all-around champion (2013, 2019, 2023–24). He represented the Netherlands at the 2024 Summer Olympics.

== Early life ==
Schmidt was born on 31 October 1995 to parents Gerard and Loes. His older sister, Annabelle, competed in gymnastics and began teaching Casimir back flips in the backyard, leading to Casimir eventually competing in gymnastics too.

== Gymnastics career ==
Schmidt won a gold medal on the vault at the 2012 Junior European Championships, and he also finished 14th in the all-around. He began competing in senior international competitions in 2013 and won his first senior national all-around title. That year, he also made his World Championships debut, finishing 18th in the all-around final.

Schmidt won a gold medal on the floor exercise at the 2014 Ljubljana World Challenge Cup and also won a bronze medal on the vault. Then at the 2014 European Championships, he helped the Dutch team place sixth. He tied with Finland's Tomi Tuuha for fourth place in the vault final. He also competed at the 2014 World Championships but did not advance into any finals.

Schmidt represented the Netherlands at the 2015 European Games alongside Frank Rijken and Bram Verhofstad, and they finished 15th in the team competition. Individually, Schmidt qualified for the all-around final and finished 13th. Then in the vault final, he won the silver medal behind Ukraine's Oleg Verniaiev. He then helped the Dutch team finish 11th in the qualification round of the 2015 World Championships, allowing them to qualify for the 2016 Olympic Test Event.

Schmidt competed with the team at the 2016 Olympic Test Event that won the bronze medal, qualifying them as a full team for the 2016 Summer Olympics. However, Schmidt was not ultimately selected to compete at the Olympic Games. At the 2017 European Championships, he finished 11th in the all-around final. He then won a bronze medal on the vault at the 2017 Koper World Challenge Cup, behind Andrey Medvedev and Donnell Whittenburg.

Schmidt competed at the 2018 European Championships and helped the Dutch team finish ninth in the qualification round, making them the first reserves for the team final. Then at the 2018 World Championships, Schmidt and the Dutch team qualified for the team final, finishing eighth. After the World Championships, he competed at the 2018 Cottbus World Cup and won a silver medal on the floor exercise behind Artem Dolgopyat.

Schmidt finished 12th in the all-around final at the 2019 European Championships. He competed with Sanna Veerman at the 2019 Swiss Cup Zürich, a mixed pairs competition, and they placed eighth. At the 2021 European Championships, he finished 15th in the all-around during the qualification round and did not earn an individual berth for the Olympic Games. He then withdrew from the all-around final.

Schmidt finished 12th in the all-around final at the 2022 World Championships. He then competed at the 2022 Swiss Cup Zürich alongside Eythora Thordottir, and they placed sixth. He finished seventh at the 2022 Arthur Gander Memorial. He won a bronze medal on the horizontal bar at the 2023 Cairo World Cup. He then finished 15th in the all-around final at the 2023 European Championships. At the 2023 World Championships, Schmidt and the Dutch team placed 11th in the qualification round and earned a team berth for the 2024 Olympic Games.

Schmidt won his fourth national all-around title at the 2024 Dutch Championships. He was then selected to compete at the 2024 Summer Olympics alongside Jermain Grünberg, Loran de Munck, Frank Rijken, and Martijn de Veer. The team finished 10th in the qualification round, making them the second reserves for the team final. Individually, Schmidt qualified for the all-around final, where he finished 13th. After the Olympic Games, he traveled across the United States performing as part of Simone Biles' Gold Over America Tour.
