= Jeffrey Wammes =

Dutch gymnast

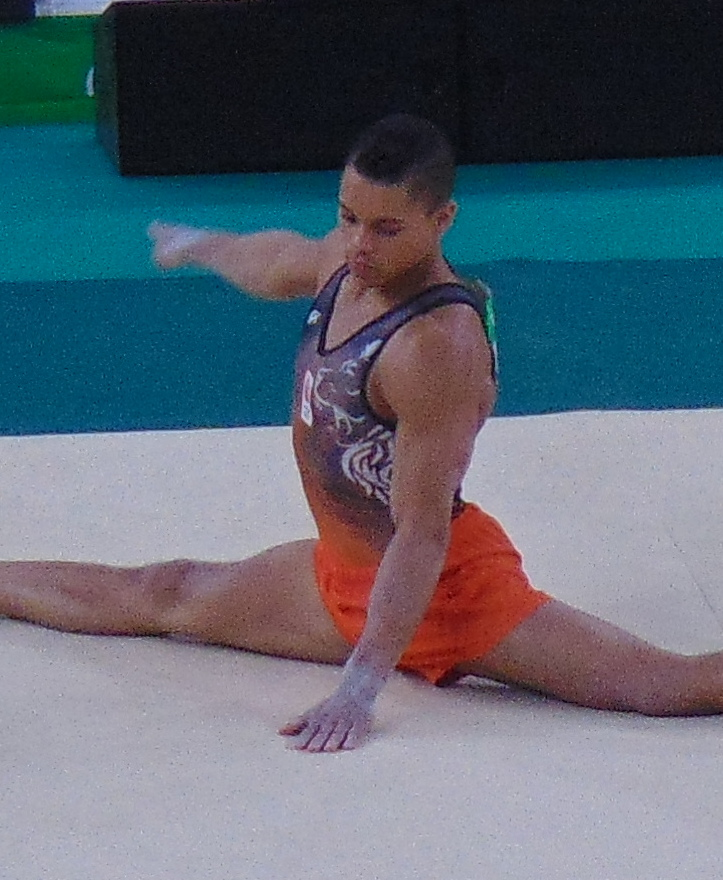
- Wammes at the 2016 Summer Olympics

Personal information
- Full name: Theodore Jeffrey Wammes
- Born: 24 April 1987 (age 39) Utrecht, Netherlands

Gymnastics career
- Discipline: Men's artistic gymnastics
- Country represented: Netherlands
- Club: Flik-Flak ’s-Hertogenbosch
- Head coach: Bram van Bokhoven
Medal record
Representing Netherlands
World Cup Final
Silver medal – second place	2008 Madrid	Vault
European Championships
Bronze medal – third place	2005 Debrecen	Vault
Bronze medal – third place	2007 Amsterdam	Vault

Jeffrey Wammes (born 24 April 1987) is a former internationally competitive Dutch gymnast. Specializing in the floor exercise and vault, Wammes began competing on the elite level in 2005. Wammes trained alongside Yuri van Gelder at the Flik-Flak club in 's-Hertogenbosch.

== Early life and education ==
Wammes was born in Utrecht, Netherlands. Jeffrey’s father, Theo, is Dutch, and his mother, Ciska, is one-quarter Surinamese and one-quarter Antillean. However, he considers himself more Dutch.

He first began gymnastics at the age of three after his older sister, Gabriella, introduced him to the sport. He studied Sport Management and Economics at the Johan Cruyff College in Amsterdam.

== Gymnastics career ==
In February 2004, the 17-year-old Wammes first competed internationally.

At the 2005 American Cup in Uniondale, New York (part of the World Cup circuit that year), Wammes won gold on floor and vault. Then at the European Championships in Debrecen, he won the bronze medal for vault. At the 2005 World Championships in Melbourne, Wammes and Epke Zonderland became the first Dutch men to qualify for the all-around finals; Wammes finished fifteenth. He also qualified for the floor and vault finals, finishing fifth and eighth, respectively.

In March 2006, Wammes broke both his ankles during his floor routine at the World Cup in Lyon. His recovery lasted over six months and created a major setback in his career. However, in October, Wammes was able to participate in the World Championships in Aarhus.

In 2007, Wammes competed at the European Championships in Amsterdam and won a bronze medal on vault. In the all-around, he finished ninth. During the 2007 World Cup in Stuttgart, he placed fifth in the high bar finals.

2010 was a particularly good year for Wammes. During the World Cup Gymnastics in October in Rotterdam he only finished in eighth place on the vault component, but during several World Cups he won many medals. On 12 September, he won gold on the vault in the World Cup matches in Ghent. On 20 November 2010, he won medals in three parts during the World Cup in Glasgow; he earned two bronze medals (on floor and vault) and won silver on the high bar. On vault, he won the World Cup. With this performance, he secured his participation in these three components during the World Cup in 2011.

He also obtained that year in various World Cups, the following medals:

- 13 March, Cottbus: bronze on floor,
- 23 March, Qatar: 3x bronze on floor, vault and rings,
- 11 April, Paris: silver on vault,
- 15 May, Moscow: bronze on floor,
- 13 November, Stuttgart: 2x silver vault and high bar.

As a token of appreciation for this good performance, on 13 December 2010 he was awarded the "Fanny" for Sportsman of Amsterdam 2010. Wammes was the All Around Dutch champion four times: in 2005, 2007, 2008 and 2010.

In 2012, Wammes competed against Epke Zonderland for the opportunity to represent the Netherlands at the 2012 Summer Olympics. Wammes won the case, but a fracture line in his knee ended his Olympic dream for 2012. Eventually, Zonderland was selected for the Olympics, where he won a gold medal on the horizontal bar.

== Post-gymnastics career ==
Besides gymnastics, Wammes is working on a career as a dj. In 2014, Wammes appeared on the Dutch reality TV competition show Star Jumping. In the final episode, he was announced that years winner. Also in 2014, Wammes competed in Celebrity Pole Dancing where he made it to the semifinals.

Wammes currently performs in Cirque du Soleil's Mystere in Las Vegas.

== Personal life ==
In early 2009, Wammes had a four-year contract with the Dutch Ministry of Defense for the course "Defence Topsport Selection". Soon after his employment, Yuri van Gelder had to leave because of cocaine use; Wammes was also dismissed. The ministry offered no clarification, but indicated that Wammes "was not fit for military service", Wammes self stated: "I'm a little hidden away. They said I didn't do my best. Strange thing is that during the training this was never mentioned. It was quite a shock. When I hear that contracts by other athletes aren't renewed, I think of myself."

Since March 2010, Wammes has been an ambassador for Right To Play. This international humanitarian organization improves the lives of children in the world's most disadvantaged areas through sport and play programs.

In 2011, Wammes came out as gay when he appeared in an edition of Linda Magazine focused on gay athletes. He stated, "There was already a lot of speculation about whether or not I fell for boys or girls. To me it has nothing to do with sport or how I perform. But when I was asked to do this, I made it clear straight away how things were and that’s that." In the 2016 Olympics in Rio De Janeiro, Wammes joined the record amount of openly gay, lesbian, and bisexual athletes to compete in a single Olympics. Wammes was just one of 56 competitors who publicly identified as LGBT during the Olympic games. In 2019, Wammes was named an ambassador for Amsterdam Gay Pride. In an interview with Amsterdam Gay Pride's Paul Hofman, Wammes stated, “It’s a great honour for me. Because personally, it means a lot to me. Actually, it is pretty strange that Pride is still needed. There is still a taboo on it.”

== Competitive history ==
2007 Dutch National Championships
	Floor Exercise	Pommel Horse	Still Rings	Vault	Parallel Bars	Horizontal Bar	All Around
Score	15.750	13.800	15.150	15.725	15.200	15.500	88.200
Place	1st	2nd (T)	1st	1st	2nd	2nd	1st

2008 Dutch National Championships
	Floor Exercise	Pommel Horse	Still Rings	Vault	Parallel Bars	Horizontal Bar	All Around
Score	15.000	13.300	14.400	15.875	14.100	14.800	87.800
Place	1st	---	---	1st	2nd	2nd	1st
