= Salomon Konijn =

Dutch gymnast

- Born: 14 January 1874 Amsterdam, Netherlands
- Died: 15 March 1932 (aged 58) Amsterdam, Netherlands

Gymnastics career
- Discipline: Men's artistic gymnastics
- Country represented: Netherlands

Salomon Konijn (14 January 1874, Amsterdam – 15 March 1932, Amsterdam) was a Dutch gymnast who competed in the 1908 Summer Olympics. He was part of the Dutch gymnastics team, which finished seventh in the team event.
