= Martijn de Veer =

Dutch artistic gymnast (born 2002)

- Born: 21 November 2002 (age 23) Rotterdam, Netherlands

Gymnastics career
- Discipline: Men's artistic gymnastics
- Country represented: Netherlands
- Club: Top Turnen Zuid-Holland

Martijn de Veer (born 21 November 2002) is a Dutch artistic gymnast. He represented the Netherlands at the 2024 Summer Olympics.

== Early life and education ==
De Veer was born in 2002 in Rotterdam. He initially played football, but his mother encouraged him to focus on gymnastics. As of 2024, De Veer studies business administration at the Rotterdam University of Applied Sciences.

== Gymnastics career ==
At the 2022 European Championships, De Veer competed with the Dutch team that placed 11th in the qualification round. He won the bronze medal in the all-around at the 2022 Dutch Championships. He also won a silver medal on the horizontal bar and bronze medals on the floor exercise and parallel bars. He then competed at the 2022 World Championships in Liverpool where the Dutch team finished 13th in the qualification round. De Veer also did not qualify for any of the individual finals.

De Veer finished fourth on the horizontal bar at the 2023 Cottbus World Cup. He was unable to compete at the 2023 European Championships due to a knee injury. He was the team alternate for the Netherlands at the 2023 World Championships. The team placed 11th in the qualification round and earned a team berth for the 2024 Olympic Games.

De Veer finished fourth in the all-around and won the floor exercise title at the 2024 Dutch Championships. He was then selected to compete at the 2024 Summer Olympics alongside Jermain Grünberg, Loran de Munck, Frank Rijken, and Casimir Schmidt.
