= Dirk Janssen =

Dutch artistic gymnast

- Born: 11 July 1881 Groningen, Netherlands
- Died: 22 November 1986 (aged 105) Haarlem, Netherlands
- Relatives: Jan Janssen (brother)

Gymnastics career
- Country represented: Netherlands
Medal record
World Championships
Silver medal – second place	1905 Bordeaux	Team

Dirk Janssen (11 July 1881 – 22 November 1986) was a Dutch gymnast who competed in the 1908 Summer Olympics.

Born in Groningen, Janssen was part of the Dutch gymnastics team, which finished seventh in the team event. In the individual all-around competition, he finished 69th.

He was the younger brother of Jan Janssen. He died at the age of 105 in Haarlem.
