= Johannes Göckel =

Dutch gymnast

- Born: 28 December 1886 Amsterdam, Netherlands
- Died: 6 June 1960 (aged 73) Amsterdam, Netherlands

Gymnastics career
- Discipline: Men's artistic gymnastics
- Country represented: Netherlands

Johannes Cornelis Gerrit Göckel (28 December 1886 – 6 June 1960) was a Dutch gymnast from Amsterdam who competed in the 1908 Summer Olympics. He was part of the Dutch gymnastics team, which finished seventh in the team event. He died in Amsterdam in 1960.
