= Jermain Grünberg =

Dutch artistic gymnast (born 2000)

- Alternative name: Jermain Gruenberg
- Born: 2 September 2000 (age 26) Tilburg, Netherlands

Gymnastics career
- Discipline: Men's artistic gymnastics
- Country represented: Netherlands
- Gym: Flik-Flak
- Head coach: Marcel Kleuskens
Medal record
Representing Netherlands
FIG World Cup
Event	1st	2nd	3rd
Apparatus World Cup	0	0	1
World Challenge Cup	0	0	1
Total	0	0	2

Jermain Grünberg (born 2 September 2000) is a Dutch artistic gymnast. He represented the Netherlands at the 2024 Summer Olympics.

== Early life ==
Grünberg was born on 2 September 2000 in Tilburg. His father is from Indonesia. His mother and grandmother worked as gymnastics coaches, which is how he started the sport. He moved to Den Bosch when he was 18 years old for his gymnastics training and chose not to go to university.

== Gymnastics career ==
At 15 years old, Grünberg was selected to compete at the 2016 Junior European Championships, and the Dutch team finished 21st. He also competed at the 2018 Junior European Championships where the Dutch team finished 22nd.

Grünberg missed the 2021 European Championships because of a torn ligament in his ankle. At the 2021 World Championships, he dislocated his finger in the middle of his parallel bars routine. Despite this, he still finished the competition and placed 38th in the all-around.

Grünberg won the all-around silver medal at the 2022 Dutch Championships, losing the gold medal due to a fall on his still rings dismount. In the event finals, he won the gold medal on the parallel bars, the silver medal on the floor exercise, and the bronze medal on the pommel horse. At the 2022 European Championships, he competed with the Dutch team that placed 11th in the qualification round. He then competed at the 2022 World Championships in Liverpool where the Dutch team finished 13th in the qualification round. He also did not qualify for any of the individual finals.

Grünberg won his first FIG World Cup medal at the 2023 Varna World Challenge Cup with a bronze medal on the parallel bars. He also placed seventh in the horizontal bar final. He was initially the first reserve for the parallel bars final at the Osijek World Challenge Cup, but he was able to compete after a withdrawal and placed seventh. At the 2023 World Championships, Grünberg and the Dutch team placed 11th in the qualification round and earned a team berth for the 2024 Olympic Games.

Grünberg placed sixth on the still rings at the 2024 Osijek World Challenge Cup. He then competed at the 2024 European Championships where the Dutch team finished 12th in the qualification round, and he did not advance into any event finals. He won the all-around bronze medal and the horizontal bar title at the 2024 Dutch Championships. He was then selected to compete at the 2024 Summer Olympics alongside Martijn de Veer, Loran de Munck, Frank Rijken, and Casimir Schmidt.

In June 2025, Grünberg won the all-around title at the Dutch Championships, making this his first Dutch championship win as a senior and his 4th championship win overall.
