= Michel Bletterman =

Dutch artistic gymnast

- Born: 14 February 1992 (age 34)
- Height: 1.73 m (5 ft 8 in)

Gymnastics career
- Discipline: Men's artistic gymnastics
- Country represented: Netherlands; (2010–2020)
- Club: T&P SPORT
- Head coaches: Daniël Knibbeler; Mitch Fenner
- Retired: 23 March 2020

Michel Bletterman (born 14 February 1992) is a former Dutch male artistic gymnast, representing the Netherlands at international competitions. He competed at world championships, including the 2010 World Artistic Gymnastics Championships in Rotterdam, the Netherlands and the 2014 World Artistic Gymnastics Championships. He was reserve for the 2016 Olympic Games in Rio de Janeiro. Daniël Knibbeler is his personal coach and Mitch Fenner is Bletterman's national team coach.

Bletterman announced his retirement on 23 March 2020.
