= Loran de Munck =

Dutch gymnast (born 1999)

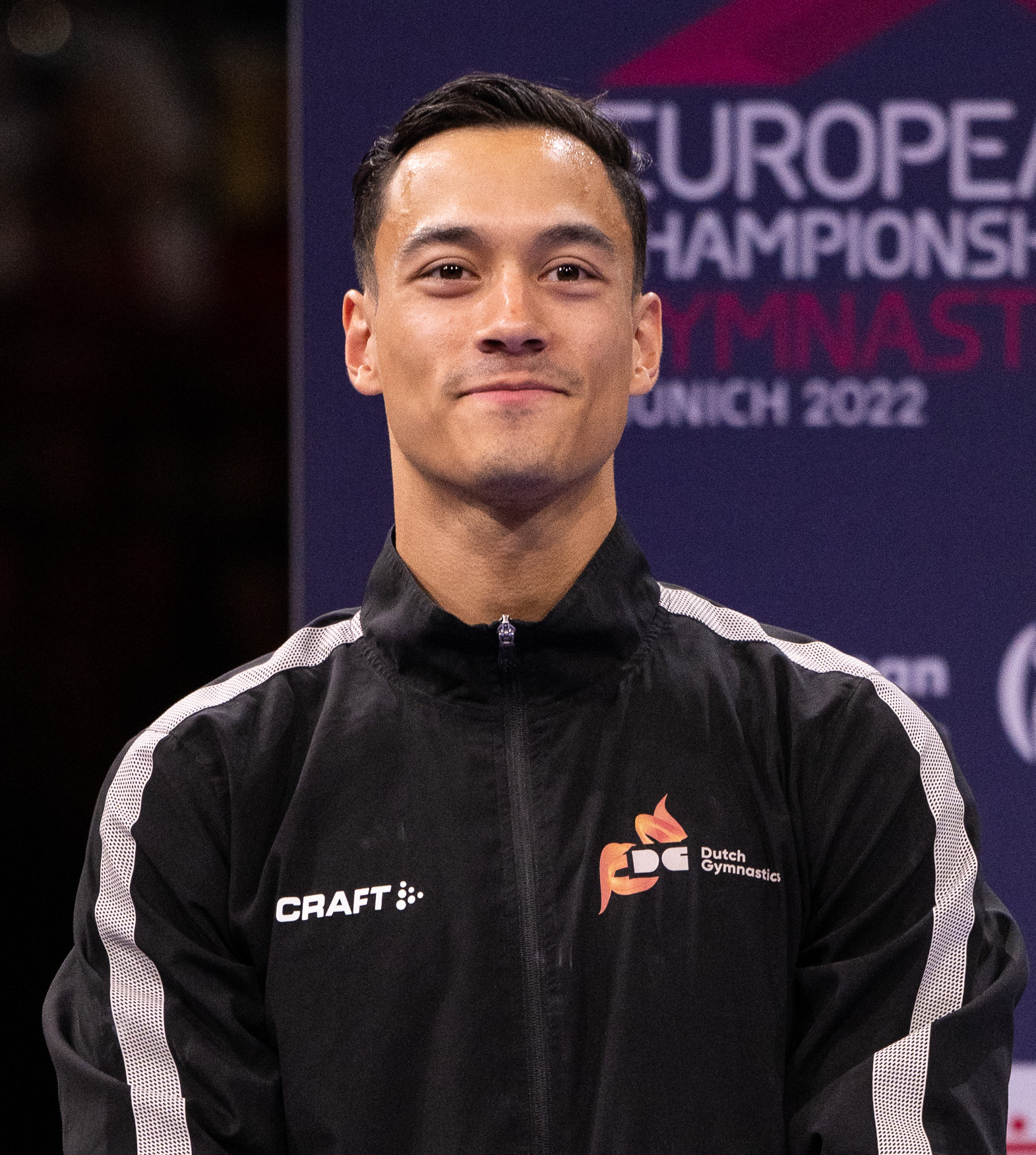
- De Munck at the 2022 European Championships

Personal information
- Born: 9 May 1999 (age 27) Haarlem, Netherlands

Gymnastics career
- Discipline: Men's artistic gymnastics
- Country represented: Netherlands
- Club: SV Pax Haarlemmermeer
- Head coach: Dirk van Meldert
Medal record
European Championships
Silver medal – second place	2022 Munich	Pommel horse
Silver medal – second place	2024 Rimini	Pommel horse

Loran de Munck OLY (born 9 May 1999) is a Dutch artistic gymnast. At the 2022 European Championships, he became the first Dutch gymnast to win a European medal on the pommel horse. He is also the 2024 European pommel horse silver medalist and a 2024 Olympic finalist on the same apparatus.

== Early life ==
De Munck was born on 9 May 1999 in Haarlem. He began gymnastics when he was five years old.

== Gymnastics career ==
=== 2021 ===
De Munck finished ninth on the pommel horse in the qualification round of the 2021 European Championships, making him the first reserve for the event final. At the Varna World Challenge Cup, he finished eighth on the parallel bars. Then at the 2021 World Championships, he was the third reserve for the pommel horse final.

=== 2022 ===
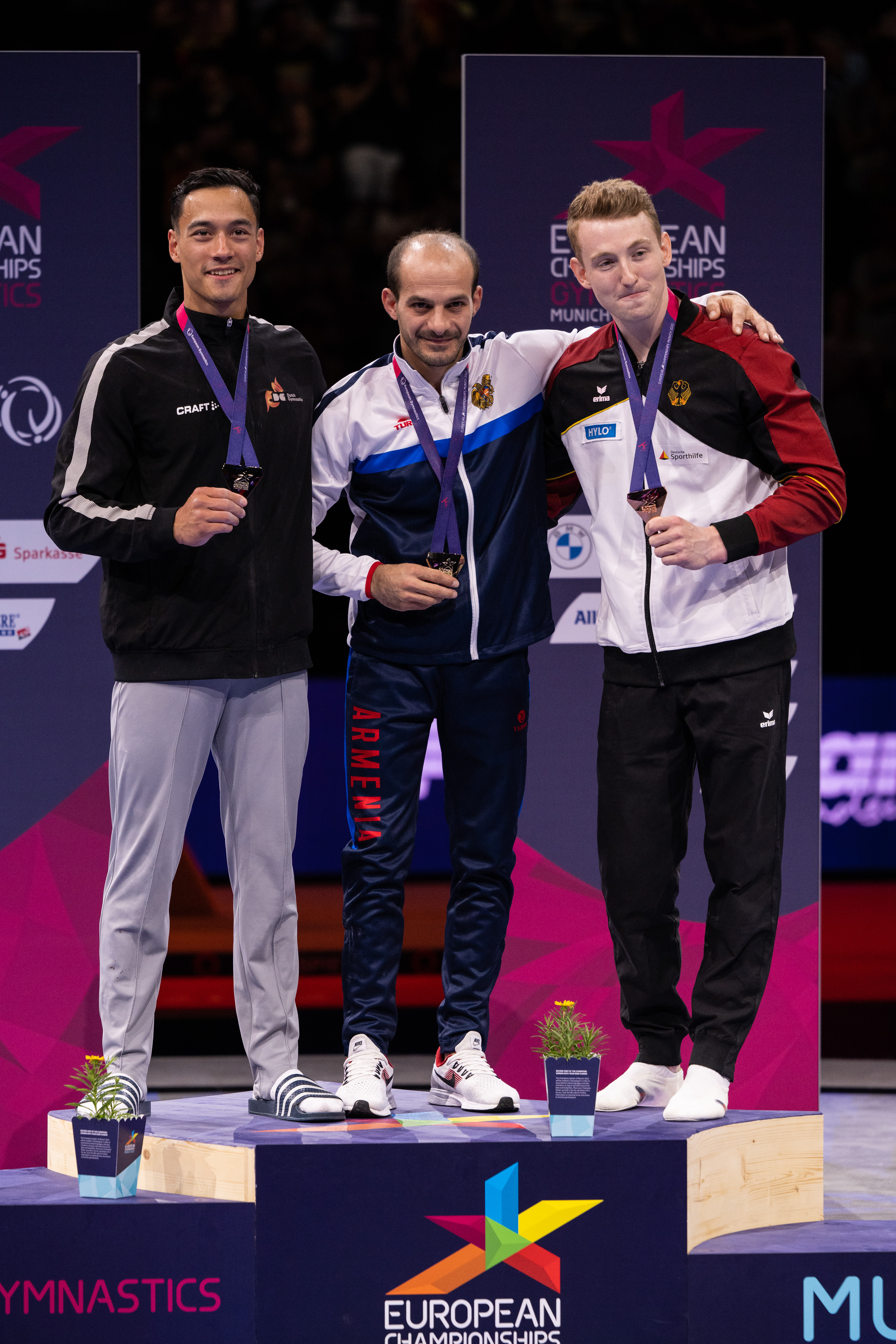
De Munck (left) at the 2022 European Championships

De Munck finished eighth on the parallel bars at the 2022 Baku World Cup. Then at the Varna World Challenge Cup, he finished fourth in the pommel horse final. He then won the silver medal on the pommel horse at the 2022 European Championships, only 0.033 behind Armenia's Harutyun Merdinyan. This was the first time a Dutch gymnast won a European medal on the pommel horse. Then at the 2022 World Championships, he placed sixth in the pommel horse final after a fall. Additionally, the Dutch team finished 13th in the qualification round.

=== 2023 ===
At the 2023 Cairo World Cup, De Munck finished sixth on the pommel horse and fifth on the parallel bars. He then finished fourth in the pommel horse final at the 2023 European Championships after losing the execution-score tiebreaker for the bronze medal. At the 2023 World Championships, de Munck and the Dutch team placed 11th in the qualification round and earned a team berth for the 2024 Olympic Games. Individually, he was the second reserve for the pommel horse final.

=== 2024 ===
De Munck finished seventh in the pommel horse final at the 2024 Cottbus World Cup. He then won a silver medal on the pommel horse at the 2024 European Championships behind Ireland's Rhys McClenaghan. He was then selected to compete at the 2024 Summer Olympics alongside Jermain Grünberg, Martijn de Veer, Frank Rijken, and Casimir Schmidt. The team finished 10th in the qualification round, making them the second reserves for the team final. Individually, de Munck qualified for the pommel horse event final and finished eighth.
