= Johan Schmitt =

Dutch artistic gymnast

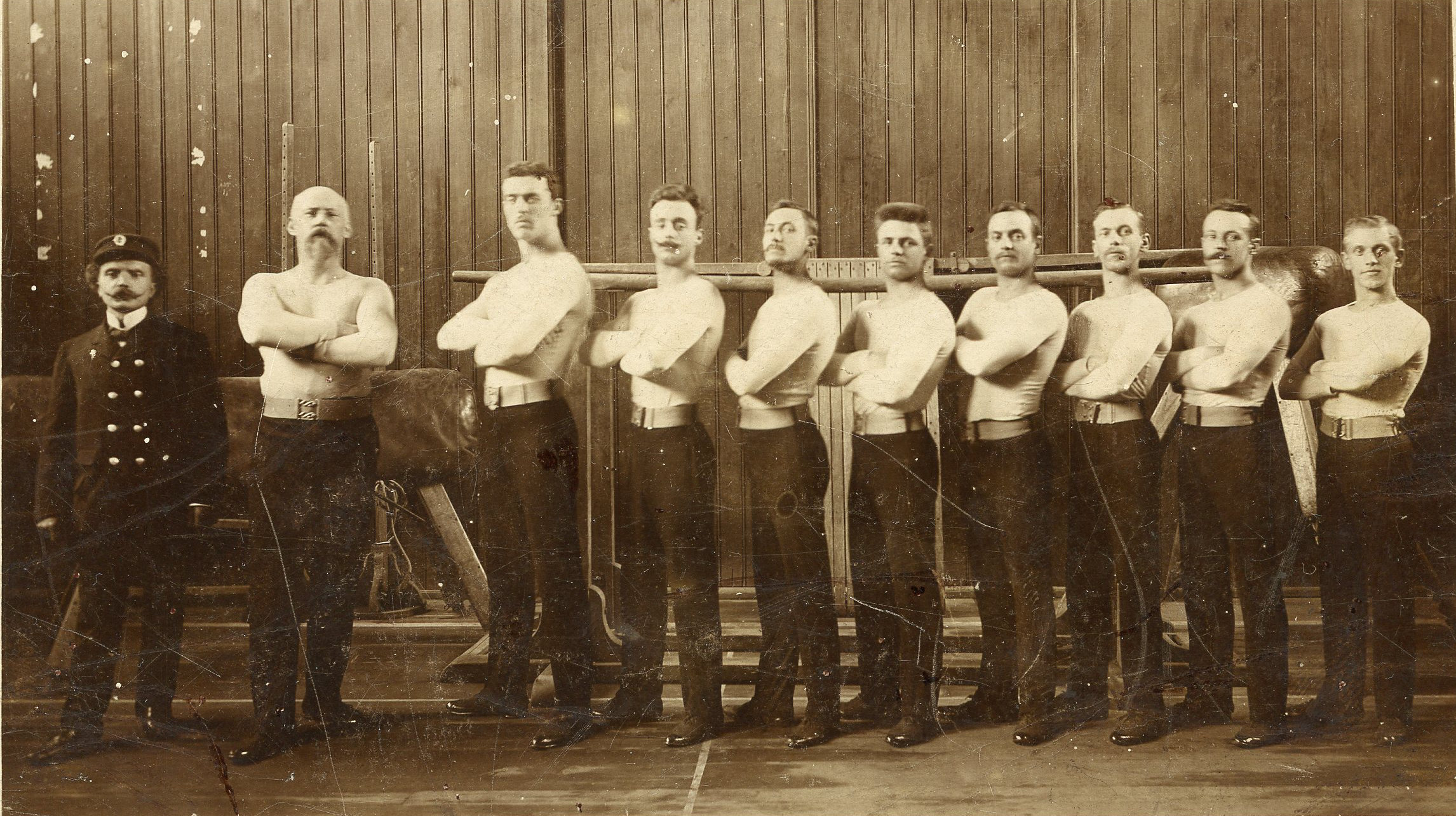
- Dutch team at the 1905 World Championships. Johan Schmitt is 3rd from the left

Personal information
- Full name: Johan Henri Antoine Gerrit Schmitt
- Born: 31 August 1881 Vrijenban, Netherlands
- Died: 12 August 1955 (aged 73) Amsterdam, Netherlands

Gymnastics career
- Discipline: Men's artistic gymnastics
- Country represented: Netherlands
Medal record
World Championships
Silver medal – second place	1905 Bordeaux	Team

Johan Henri Antoine Gerrit Schmitt (August 31, 1881 – August 12, 1955) was a Dutch gymnast, visual artist, musician, physical educator. He was a pioneer of artistic gymnastics in Amsterdam.

== Early life and education ==
Schmitt attended art school Quellinus from 1896 to 1901. He was a drawer, sculptor, and musician.

In 1904, Schmitt was awarded the Honorary Medal for Charitable Assistance in bronze. On June 28th that year he had jumped into the Herengracht to rescue a drowning person.

== Gymnastics career ==
Gymnastics was his hobby that became his profession in 1907 when he became a gymnastics teacher. He retired in that capacity in 1941 from the Barlaeus gymnasium.

Schmitt was part of the team of the Netherlands that won the silver medal at the second World Championships in 1905. He was retrospectively scored in 9th place all around (the event was purely a team event).

Schmitt won the individual events at the 1908 gymnastics tournament of the Dutch Gymnastics Association.

At the 1908 Summer Olympics, Schmitt was also part of the Dutch gymnastics team which finished seventh in the team event. De Telegraaf adscribed the disappointing result explicitly to Schmitt, who had organized a night of entertainment during the journey by boat at the Batavier IV. De Telegraaf blamed the team for a lack of preparation and a bad attitude toward the games.

Alongside his career as a competitive gymnast, Schmitt was also active in the organization of gymnastics clubs and events, frequently applying his art skills. In 1919, Schmitt designed the poster and was principal director of the celebration of the 50th anniversary of the Dutch Gymnastics Association.

In 1924, Schmitt was a member of the committee to strengthen gymnastics as a sport for women in the Netherlands. Around that time, Schmitt also introduced rhythmic gymnastics in the Netherlands, by organizing workshops in which he played the piano.
