= Bram Verhofstad =

Dutch artistic gymnast

- Born: 3 February 1995 (age 31) Leiderdorp, Netherlands
- Height: 1.77 m (5 ft 10 in)

Gymnastics career
- Discipline: Men's artistic gymnastics
- Country represented: Netherlands

Bram Verhofstad (born 3 February 1995) is a Dutch artistic gymnast. He competed at the 2017 Artistic Gymnastics World Championships in October 2017 where he qualified to the floor exercise final. Bram also has a YouTube channel where he vlogs about many things.
