= Bart Deurloo =

Dutch artistic gymnast

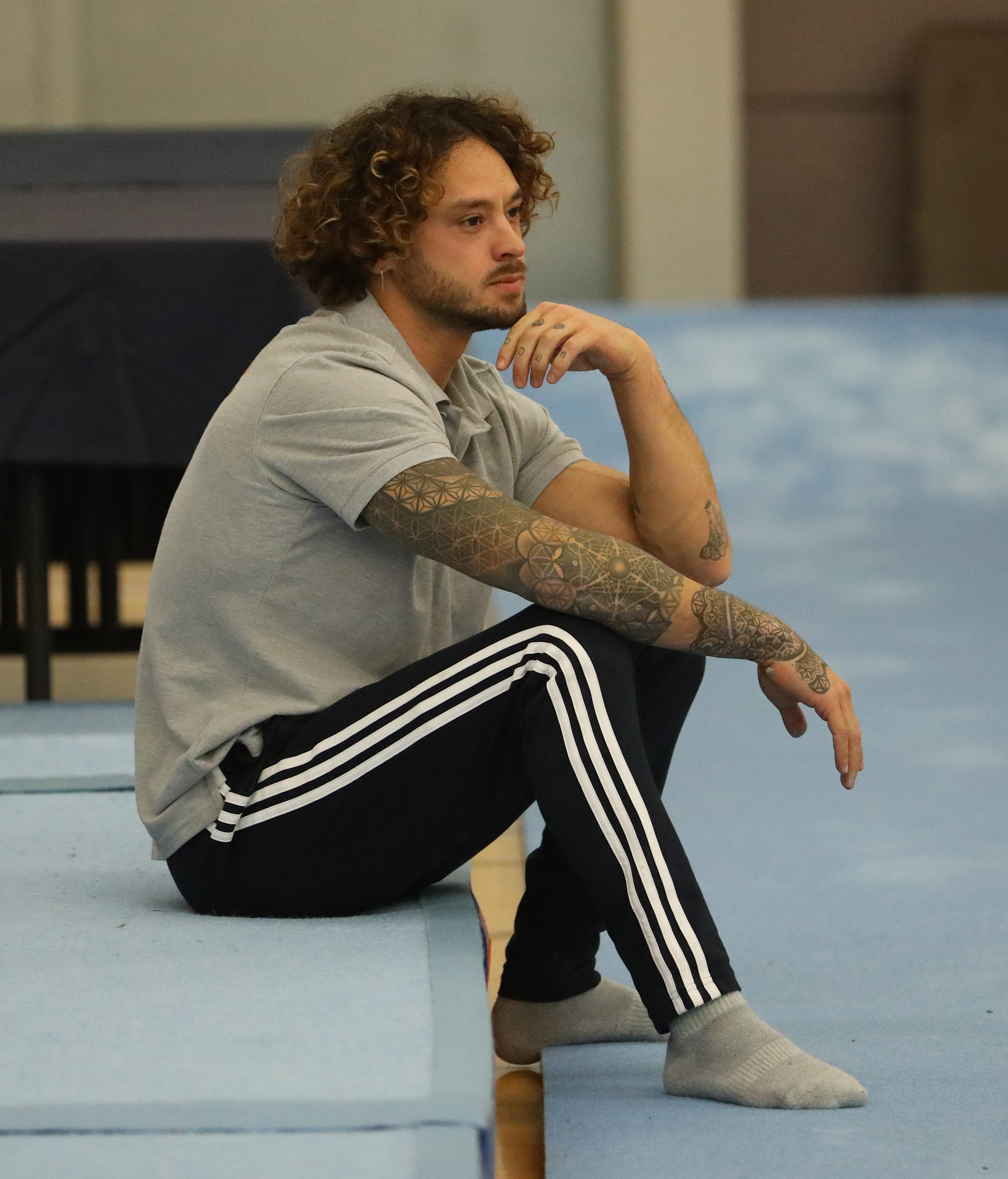
- Deurloo in 2022

Personal information
- Born: 23 February 1991 (age 35) Ridderkerk, Netherlands
- Height: 1.75 m (5 ft 9 in)

Gymnastics career
- Discipline: Men's artistic gymnastics
- Country represented: Netherlands; (2009–2026)
- Club: O&O Zwijndrecht
- Head coach: Jeroen Jacobs
- Retired: 4 September 2026
Medal record
Men's gymnastics
Representing the Netherlands
World Championships
Bronze medal – third place	2017 Montreal	Horizontal bar
FIG World Cup
Event	1st	2nd	3rd
Apparatus World Cup	1	0	0
World Challenge Cup	2	5	2
Total	3	5	2

Bart Deurloo (born 23 February 1991) is a Dutch artistic gymnast. He is the 2017 World bronze medalist on the horizontal bar and a five-time Dutch national champion in the all-around. He competed at the 2016 and 2020 Summer Olympics.

== Gymnastics career ==
Deurloo's mother was a former gymnast, so he began the sport at the age of six.

=== 2009–2012 ===
Deurloo competed at his first World Championships in 2009 and was the third reserve for the all-around final. He competed at the 2010 European Championships, where the Dutch team finished 11th in the qualifications.

Deurloo advanced to the all-around final at the 2011 European Championships and finished 14th. He was unable to compete at the 2011 World Championships due to a hand injury. He won a gold medal on the horizontal bar at the 2012 Ostrava World Challenge Cup. In 2012, he won his first national all-around title.

=== 2013–2015 ===
Deurloo missed the 2013 European Championships due to a knee injury. He was able to compete at the 2013 World Championships, where he finished 14th in the all-around final. At the 2014 Ljubljana World Challenge Cup, Deurloo won the silver medal on the horizontal bar to teammate Epke Zonderland. He competed with the Dutch team that placed sixth at the 2014 European Championships. He was unable to compete at the 2014 World Championships due to a wrist injury.

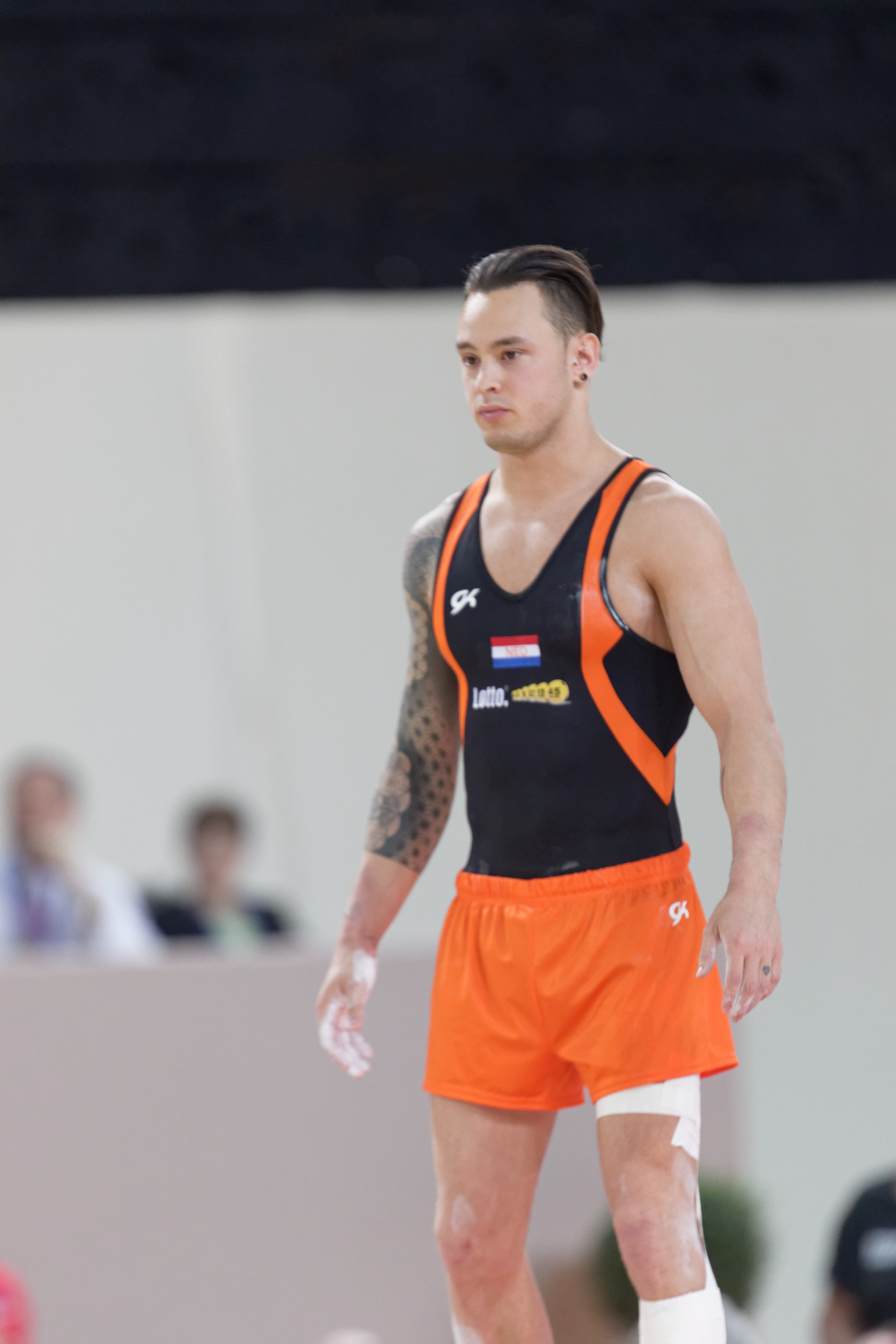
Deurloo at the 2015 European Championships

Deurloo won a bronze medal on the floor exercise at the 2015 Cottbus World Challenge Cup. He then won gold on the floor exercise at the Ljubljana World Challenge Cup, where he also won the vault silver medal and horizontal bar bronze medal. At the 2015 European Championships, he finished sixth in the floor exercise final. He finished 14th in the all-around at the 2015 World Championships, matching his placement from 2013.

=== 2016–2017 ===
Deurloo competed with the team at the 2016 Olympic Test Event that won the bronze medal, qualifying them as a full team for the 2016 Summer Olympics. He represented the Netherlands at the 2016 Summer Olympics. He became the first Dutch male artistic gymnast to compete in an Olympic all-around final, where he finished 15th. Additionally, the Dutch team finished 10th during the qualification round.

Deurloo finished fourth in the all-around at the 2017 American Cup. He won a silver medal on the horizontal bar at the Koper World Challenge Cup behind Tin Srbić. Later that same month, he won another horizontal silver medal to Srbić at the Osijek World Challenge Cup. At the Paris World Challenge Cup, he won another silver medal on the horizontal bar, this time behind Epke Zonderland. He then won the horizontal bar bronze medal at the 2017 World Championships, behind Srbić and Zonderland.

=== 2018–2019 ===
Deurloo won the horizontal bar gold medal at the 2018 Baku World Cup. He then helped the Dutch team finish ninth at the 2018 European Championships, making them the first reserves for the team final. Then at the 2018 World Championships, Deurloo and the Dutch team qualified for the team final, finishing eighth.

At the 2019 American Cup, Deurloo finished seventh in the all-around. He then finished sixth at the Stuttgart World Cup, and he placed eighth at the Tokyo World Cup.

=== 2020–2024 ===
Deurloo represented the Netherlands at the 2020 Summer Olympics and qualified for the horizontal bar final, finishing seventh after falling. After the Olympic Games, he had surgery on his knee, and he took a break from competition. He then announced his retirement from the sport in February 2023 and began coaching for the Dutch national team. He came out of retirement a few months later to help the Dutch team attempt to qualify for the 2024 Summer Olympics.

At the 2023 World Championships, Deurloo and the Dutch team placed 11th in the qualification round and earned a team berth for the 2024 Olympic Games. Individually, he finished tenth in the horizontal bar qualifications and was the first reserve for the final.

=== 2026 ===
Deurloo retired from the sport in September 2026.
