= Netherlands men's national artistic gymnastics team =

Netherlands men's national gymnastics team
- Continental union: European Gymnastics Union

Olympic Games

World Championships
- Appearances: Silver: 1905

Junior World Championships

European Championships

The Netherlands men's national artistic gymnastics team represents the Netherlands in World Gymnastics international competitions.

== History ==
At the inaugural World Championships in 1903, Dutch gymnast Hendricus Thijsen won gold on pommel horse in a three-way tie. At the 1905 World Championships, the Dutch team would win their first team medal, a silver. It wouldn't be for another 100 years until a Dutch male gymnast won another medal at the World Championships, when Yuri van Gelder won gold on rings at the 2005 World Championships.

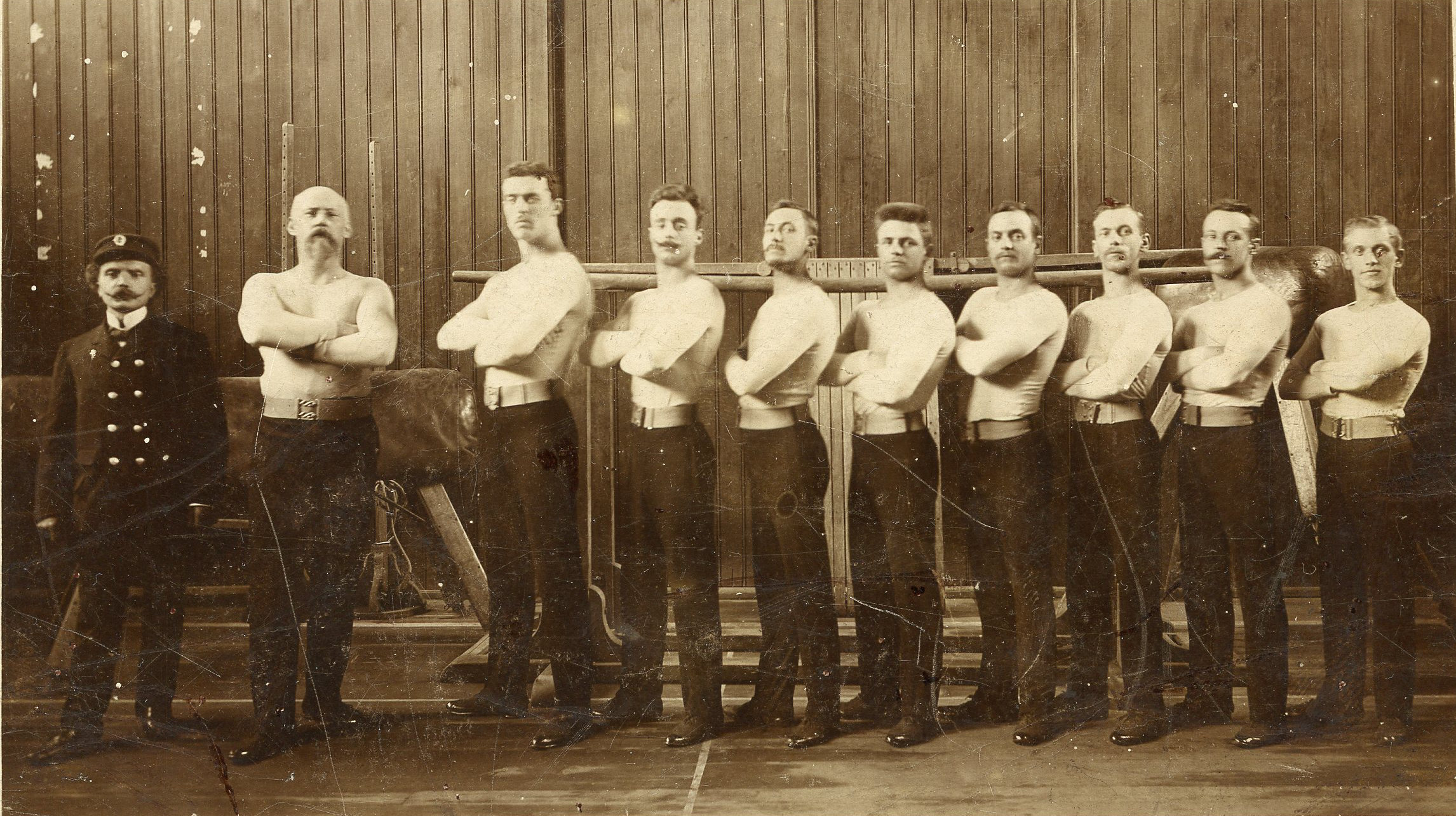
Silver medal-winning Dutch team at the 1905 World Championships

At the 2012 Olympic Games, Epke Zonderland became the first Dutch gymnast to win an individual medal, winning gold on the horizontal bar.

== Team competition results ==
=== Olympic Games ===
Year	Position	Squad
1908	7th place	Cornelus Becker, Michel Biet, Reinier Blom, Jan Bolt, Emanuel Brouwer, Jan de Boer, Abraham d'Oliveira, Johann Flemer, Johannes Göckel, Isidore Goudeket, Dirk Janssen, Jan Kieft, Salomon Konijn, Abraham Mok, Johannes Posthumus, Johan Schmitt, Jonas Slier, Johannes Stikkelman, Hendricus Thijsen, Constantijn van Daalen, Herman van Leeuwen, Gerardus Wesling
1928	8th place	Elias Melkman, Pieter van Dam, Mozes Jacobs, Israel Wijnschenk, Willibrordus Pouw, Jacobus van der Vinden, Klaas Boot, Hugo Licher
2016	10th place	Bart Deurloo, Frank Rijken, Yuri van Gelder, Jeffrey Wammes, Epke Zonderland
2024	10th place	Loran de Munck, Martijn de Veer, Jermain Grünberg, Frank Rijken, Casimir Schmidt

=== World Championships ===
Year	Position	Squad
1905	Silver	D. de Boer, G.J. Douw, B. Florijn, Dirk Janssen, Jan Janssen, Jan Jacob Kieft, Ferdinand Lambert, J.H. Reder, Johan Schmitt
1926	6th place	
1934	11th place	
2006	23rd place	Jeroen Hardon, Anthony van Assche, Yuri van Gelder, Kerem Venedik, Jeffrey Wammes, Epke Zonderland, Herre Zonderland
2007	20th place	Anthony van Assche, Yuri van Gelder, Carlo van Minde, Jeffrey Wammes, Epke Zonderland, Herre Zonderland
2010	17th place	Michel Bletterman, Arjen Butter, Bart Deurloo, Carlo van Minde, Jeffrey Wammes, Epke Zonderland
2011	19th place	Michel Bletterman, Arjen Butter, Anthony van Assche, Yuri van Gelder, Jeffrey Wammes, Epke Zonderland
2014	18th place	Michel Bletterman, Boudewijn de Vries, Karl Kosztka, Casimir Schmidt, Anthony van Assche, Jeffrey Wammes, Epke Zonderland
2015	11th place	Michel Bletterman, Bart Deurloo, Frank Rijken, Casimir Schmidt, Yuri van Gelder, Jeffrey Wammes, Epke Zonderland
2018	8th place	Bart Deurloo, Bram Louwije, Frank Rijken, Casimir Schmidt, Epke Zonderland
2019	19th place	Michel Bletterman, Bart Deurloo, Frank Rijken, Casimir Schmidt, Epke Zonderland
2022	13th place	Loran de Munck, Martijn de Veer, Jermain Grünberg, Jordi Hagenaar, Casimir Schmidt
2023	11th place	Loran de Munck, Bart Deurloo, Jermain Grünberg, Jordi Hagenaar, Casimir Schmidt
2026	7th place	Armine Abaidi, Loran de Munck, Elijah Faverus, Jermain Grünberg, Casimir Schmidt

== Most decorated gymnasts ==
This list includes all Dutch male artistic gymnasts who have won a medal at the Olympic Games or the World Artistic Gymnastics Championships.

Rank	Gymnast	Years	Team	AA	FX	PH	SR	VT	PB	HB	Olympic Total	World Total	Total
1	Epke Zonderland	2009–2018								2012; 2013; 2014; 2018; 2009; 2010; 2017	1	6	7
2	Yuri van Gelder	2005–2007					2005; 2007; 2006				0	3	3
3	Hendricus Thijsen	1903				1903					0	1	1
4	D. de Boer, G.J. Douw, B. Florijn, Dirk Janssen, Jan Janssen, Jan Jacob Kieft, Ferdinand Lambert, J.H. Reder, Johan Schmitt	1905	1905								0	1	1
5	Bart Deurloo	2017								2017	0	1	1

== See also ==
- Netherlands women's national artistic gymnastics team
