= Jan Jacob Kieft =

Dutch gymnast

- Born: 25 January 1877 Amsterdam, Netherlands
- Died: 2 April 1946 (aged 69) Rotterdam, Netherlands

Gymnastics career
- Discipline: Men's artistic gymnastics
- Country represented: Netherlands
Medal record
World Championships
Silver medal – second place	1905 Bordeaux	Team

Jan Jacob Kieft (25 January 1877, Amsterdam – 2 April 1946, Rotterdam), was a Dutch gymnast who competed in the 1908 Summer Olympics. Kieft was part of the Dutch gymnastics team, which finished seventh in the team event. In the individual all-around competition, he finished 74th.
