= Nic Roeser =

Luxembourgish gymnast (1896–1997)

- Full name: Nicolas Roeser
- Born: 8 November 1896 Pettingen, Luxembourg
- Died: 27 May 1997 (aged 100) Luxembourg City, Luxembourg

Gymnastics career
- Discipline: Men's artistic gymnastics
- Country represented: Luxembourg
- Gym: Société de Gymnastique Grund

Nicolas Roeser (8 November 1896 – 27 July 1997) was a Luxembourgish gymnast who competed at the 1928 Summer Olympics where, representing Société de Gymnastique Grund, his best individual finish was joint-32nd (with Ladislav Tikal of Czechoslovakia) in the men's horse vault. He was ranked, alongside his team, 9th among 11 nations in the team all-around. He was born in Pettingen.
