= Jan Bolt =

Dutch artistic gymnast

- Born: 3 February 1876 Groningen, Netherlands
- Died: 7 May 1967 (aged 91) Laren, Gelderland, Netherlands

Gymnastics career
- Discipline: Men's artistic gymnastics
- Country represented: Netherlands
Medal record
World Championships
Silver medal – second place	1905 Bordeaux	Team

Jan Bolt (February 3, 1876, in Groningen – May 7, 1967, in Laren) was a Dutch gymnast who competed in the 1908 Summer Olympics. He was part of the Dutch gymnastics team, which finished seventh in the team event.
