= Mario Tambini =

Italian gymnast

- Born: 7 March 1892 Faenza, Kingdom of Italy
- Died: 20 April 1973 (aged 81) Faenza, Italy

Gymnastics career
- Discipline: Men's artistic gymnastics
- Country represented: Italy

Mario Tambini (7 March 1892 – 20 April 1973) was an Italian gymnast. He competed in seven events at the 1928 Summer Olympics.
