= Jaakko Kunnas =

Finnish gymnast

- Kunnas with the Finland team at the 1928 Summer Olympics

Personal information
- Full name: Jaakko Aulis Kunnas
- Born: 30 August 1903 Viipuri, Grand Duchy of Finland, Russian Empire
- Died: 27 May 1986 (aged 82) Lappeenranta, Finland

Gymnastics career
- Discipline: Men's artistic gymnastics
- Country represented: Finland

Jaakko Aulis Kunnas (30 August 1903 – 27 May 1986) was a Finnish gymnast. He competed at the 1924 Summer Olympics and the 1928 Summer Olympics.
