= Paul Krempel =

American gymnast (1900–1973)

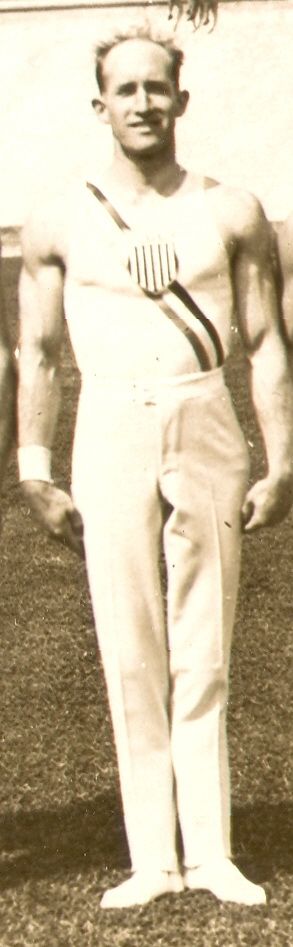
- Krempel at the 1928 Summer Olympics

Personal information
- Full name: Paul William Krempel
- Born: February 17, 1900 Los Angeles, California, U.S.
- Died: June 30, 1973 (aged 73) Los Angeles, California, U.S.

Gymnastics career
- Discipline: Men's artistic gymnastics
- Country represented: United States
- Gym: Los Angeles Athletic Club

Paul William Krempel (February 17, 1900 – June 30, 1973) was an American gymnast. He was a member of the United States men's national artistic gymnastics team and competed at the 1920 Summer Olympics and 1928 Summer Olympics.

As a gymnast, Krempel was a member of Los Angeles Athletic Club.
