= Jean Larrouy =

French gymnast (1907–1977)

- Larrouy with the 1928 French Olympic gymnastics team

Personal information
- Full name: Jean Henri Larrouy
- Born: 5 October 1907 Tarbes, France
- Died: 28 July 1977 (aged 69) Jû-Belloc, France

Gymnastics career
- Discipline: Men's artistic gymnastics
- Country represented: France
- Gym: La Bigourdane de Tarbes

Jean Henri Larrouy (5 October 1907 – 28 July 1977) was a French gymnast. He competed in seven events at the 1928 Summer Olympics.
