= Josy Staudt =

Luxembourgish gymnast (1904–1937)

- Full name: Joseph Staudt
- Born: 13 October 1904 Luxembourg City, Luxembourg
- Died: 19 June 1937 (aged 32) Luxembourg City, Luxembourg

Gymnastics career
- Discipline: Men's artistic gymnastics
- Country represented: Luxembourg

Joseph "Josy" Staudt (13 October 1904 – 19 June 1937) was a Luxembourgish gymnast. He competed in seven events at the 1928 Summer Olympics.
