= Herman Witzig =

American gymnast (1907–1944)

- Full name: Herman Witzig, Jr.
- Born: December 5, 1907 New York City, New York, U.S.
- Died: November 28, 1944 (aged 36) Jersey City, New Jersey, U.S.

Gymnastics career
- Discipline: Men's artistic gymnastics
- Country represented: United States
- Gym: Swiss Turnverein

Herman Witzig, Jr. (December 5, 1907 – November 28, 1944) was an American gymnast. He was a member of the United States men's national artistic gymnastics team and competed in seven events at the 1928 Summer Olympics.

As a gymnast, Witzig was a member of Swiss Turnverein in Union City, New Jersey.
