= Glenn Berry =

American gymnast

- Full name: Glenn Herbert Berry
- Born: November 4, 1904 Strauss, Kansas, U.S.
- Died: October 31, 1995 (aged 90) Templeton, California, U.S.

Gymnastics career
- Discipline: Men's artistic gymnastics
- Country represented: United States
- College team: California Golden Bears; UCLA Bruins; (1926–1927, 1924-1925)
- Club: Los Angeles Athletic Club; Polytechnic High School
- Head coach: Cap Pease
- Former coach: Martin Trieb
- Retired: c. 1932

Glenn Herbert Berry (November 4, 1904 – October 31, 1995) was an American gymnast. He was a member of the United States men's national artistic gymnastics team and competed in seven events at the 1928 Summer Olympics.

== Early life and education ==
Berry attended Polytechnic High School in Los Angeles where he competed for the school's gymnastics team.

== Gymnastics career ==
As a gymnast, Berry was a member of Los Angeles Athletic Club.

Berry attempted to make the 1932 Summer Olympics team but missed the cut and was not selected. For 41 years, Berry coached at various levels, including two years at UCLA, where he founded the program, coached, and competed. After coaching at the University of California-Berkeley, Berry judged high school, collegiate, and AAU meets and worked as a teacher. Berry is a UC-Berkeley Hall of Fame inductee.
