= Jacobus van der Vinden =

Dutch gymnast

- Full name: Jacobus Ferdinand van der Vinden
- Born: 1 October 1906 Amsterdam, Netherlands
- Died: 11 February 1972 (aged 65) Amsterdam, Netherlands

Gymnastics career
- Discipline: Men's artistic gymnastics
- Country represented: Netherlands

Jacobus Ferdinand van der Vinden (1 October 1906 – 11 February 1972) was a Dutch gymnast. He competed in seven events at the 1928 Summer Olympics.
