= Pieter van Dam =

Dutch gymnast

- Full name: Pieter Johan van Dam
- Born: 21 May 1904 The Hague, Netherlands
- Died: 11 February 1985 (aged 80) The Hague, Netherlands

Gymnastics career
- Discipline: Men's artistic gymnastics
- Country represented: Netherlands

Pieter Johan van Dam (21 May 1904 – 11 February 1985) was a Dutch gymnast. He competed in seven events at the 1928 Summer Olympics.
