= Israel Wijnschenk =

Dutch gymnast

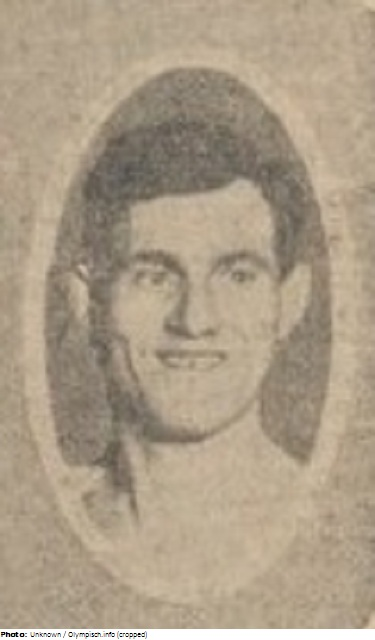

Personal information
- Born: 24 November 1895 Amsterdam, Netherlands
- Died: 31 January 1943 (aged 47) Oświęcim, Poland

Gymnastics career
- Discipline: Men's artistic gymnastics
- Country represented: Netherlands

Israel Wijnschenk (24 November 1895 – 31 January 1943) was a Dutch gymnast. He competed in seven events at the 1928 Summer Olympics. He was killed in the Auschwitz concentration camp during World War II.
