= József Szalai (gymnast) =

Hungarian gymnast

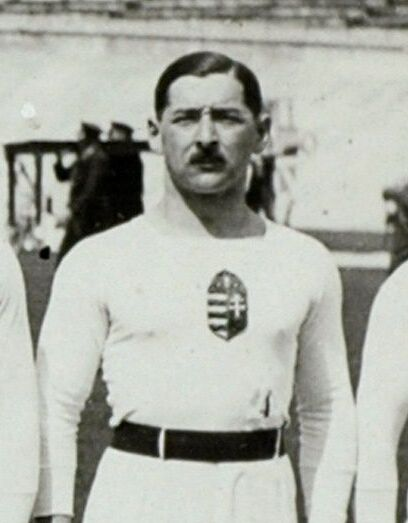
- Szalai in 1928

Personal information
- Born: 18 December 1892 Kővágóörs, Austria-Hungary
- Died: 29 November 1990 (aged 97) Budapest, Hungary
- Relatives: Béla Sebestyén (cousin)

Gymnastics career
- Discipline: Men's artistic gymnastics
- Country represented: Hungary
- Club: Magyar Testgyakorlók Köre, Vívó és Atlétikai Club

József Szalai (18 December 1892 – 29 November 1990) was a Hungarian gymnast. He competed at the 1912 Summer Olympics and the 1928 Summer Olympics.
