= Klaas Boot =

Dutch gymnast

- Full name: Klaas Boot, Sr.
- Born: 28 July 1898 Oudkarspel, Netherlands
- Died: 12 May 1969 (aged 70) Bergen, Netherlands

Gymnastics career
- Discipline: Men's artistic gymnastics
- Country represented: Netherlands

Klaas Boot Sr. (28 July 1898 – 12 May 1969) was a Dutch gymnast. He competed in seven events at the 1928 Summer Olympics.
