= Mozes Jacobs =

Dutch gymnast

- Born: 26 November 1905 Amsterdam, Netherlands
- Died: 9 July 1943 (aged 37) Sobibór, Poland

Gymnastics career
- Discipline: Men's artistic gymnastics
- Country represented: Netherlands

Mozes Jacobs (26 November 1905 – 9 July 1943) was a Dutch gymnast. He competed in seven events at the 1928 Summer Olympics. He was killed in the Sobibor extermination camp during World War II.
