= Willibrordus Pouw =

Dutch gymnast (1903–1986)

- Full name: Willibrordus Bernardus Pouw
- Born: 8 January 1903 Amsterdam, Netherlands
- Died: 16 February 1986 (aged 83) Breda, Netherlands

Gymnastics career
- Discipline: Men's artistic gymnastics
- Country represented: Netherlands

Willibrordus Bernardus Pouw (8 January 1903 – 16 February 1986) was a Dutch gymnast. He competed in seven events at the 1928 Summer Olympics.
