= Rezső Kende =

Hungarian gymnast (1908–2011)

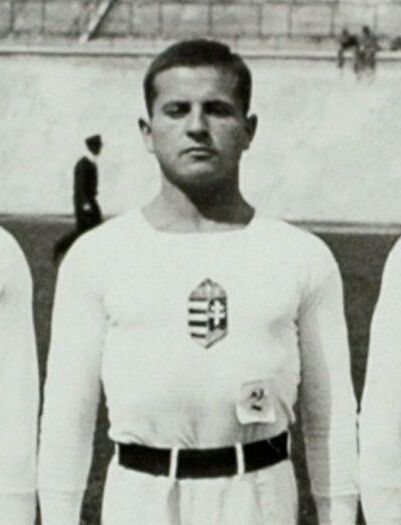
- Kendei in 1928

Personal information
- Full name: Rezső Béla Kende
- Born: 31 December 1908 Rákospalota, Austria-Hungary
- Died: 19 June 2011 (aged 102) Budapest, Hungary

Gymnastics career
- Discipline: Men's artistic gymnastics
- Country represented: Hungary
- Club: Újpesti Tornaegylet

Rezső Béla Kende (31 December 1908 – 19 June 2011) was a Hungarian gymnast who competed at the 1928 Summer Olympics in Amsterdam. He participated in six individual events, achieving his best result at the Olympics in the men's parallel bars tournament, where he finished 33rd in a field of 85 competitors. He was also a part of the Hungarian squad for the men's all-around event, which finished 10th out of 11 nations. Two years after the Olympics he competed at the 1930 World Artistic Gymnastics Championships in Luxembourg, but did not win a medal.

Kende was born in the Rákospalota neighborhood of Budapest and competed out of Újpesti TE. He was a multiple national gymnastics champion and served as a judge and referee for the sport for sixty years following his 1930 retirement. He also had a career as a jurist and attorney. When he died in June 2011, at the age of 102, he was Hungary's oldest living former Olympic competitor.
