= Imre Erdődy =

Hungarian gymnast (1889–1973)

- Born: March 26, 1889 Budapest, Hungary
- Died: January 11, 1973 (aged 83) Budapest, Hungary

Gymnastics career
- Discipline: Men's artistic gymnastics
- Country represented: Hungary
Medal record
Olympic Games
Silver medal – second place	1912 Stockholm	Team, european system

Imre Erdődy (March 26, 1889 – January 11, 1973) was a Hungarian gymnast who competed in the 1912 Summer Olympics.

He was part of the Hungarian team, which won the silver medal in the gymnastics men's team, European system event in 1912. He also competed at the 1928 Summer Olympics. Erdődy died in a car accident in 1973.
