= Hugo Licher =

Dutch gymnast (1902–1943)

- Full name: Hugo Georg Licher
- Born: 10 March 1902 Duisburg, German Empire
- Died: 14 April 1943 (aged 41) Alkmaar, Netherlands

Gymnastics career
- Discipline: Men's artistic gymnastics
- Country represented: Netherlands

Hugo Georg Licher (10 March 1902 – 14 April 1943) was a Dutch gymnast. He competed in seven events at the 1928 Summer Olympics.
