= Bert Cronin =

British gymnast (1902–1980)

- Full name: William Cronin
- Born: 15 December 1902 Swansea, Wales
- Died: 5 January 1980 (aged 77) Swansea, Wales

Gymnastics career
- Discipline: Men's artistic gymnastics
- Country represented: (United Kingdom) Great Britain

William "Bert" Cronin (15 December 1902 – 5 January 1980) was a British gymnast. He competed in seven events at the 1928 Summer Olympics.
