= Géza Tóth (gymnast) =

Hungarian gymnast

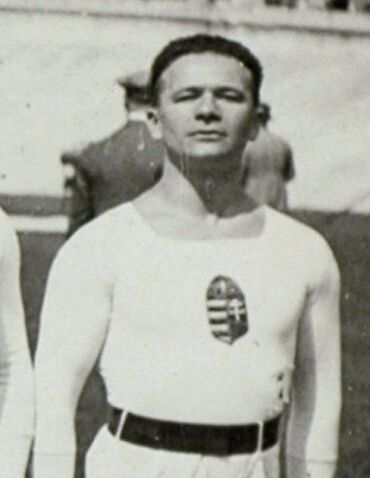
- Tóth in 1928

Personal information
- Full name: Géza István Tóth
- Born: 22 February 1907 Pécs, Austria-Hungary
- Died: 29 December 1990 (aged 83) Pécs, Hungary

Gymnastics career
- Discipline: Men's artistic gymnastics
- Country represented: Hungary
- Club: Nemzeti Torna Egylet

Géza István Tóth (22 February 1907 – 29 December 1990) was a Hungarian gymnast. He competed in seven events at the 1928 Summer Olympics.
