= Rafael Ylönen =

Finnish gymnast (1906–1997)

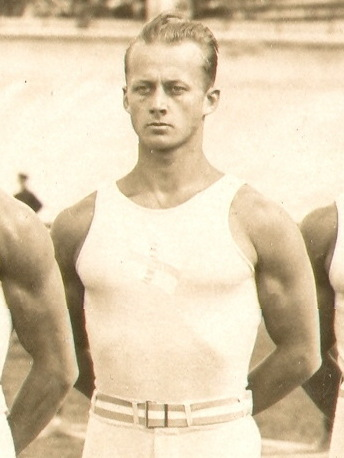
- Ylönen in 1928

Personal information
- Full name: Elis Albert Rafael Ylönen
- Born: 26 November 1906 Lappeenranta, Grand Duchy of Finland, Russian Empire
- Died: 31 March 1997 (aged 90) Mikkeli, Finland

Gymnastics career
- Discipline: Men's artistic gymnastics
- Country represented: Finland

Elis Albert Rafael Ylönen (26 November 1906 – 31 March 1997) was a Finnish gymnast. He competed in seven events at the 1928 Summer Olympics.
