= Giuseppe Lupi =

Italian gymnast

- Full name: Pietro Giuseppe Eugenio Celestino Lupi
- Born: 17 November 1894 Sestri Ponente, Kingdom of Italy

Gymnastics career
- Discipline: Men's artistic gymnastics
- Country represented: Italy
- Club: Società Ginnastica Comunale Sampierdarenese

Pietro Giuseppe Eugenio Celestino Lupi (born 17 November 1894, date of death unknown) was an Italian gymnast. He competed in seven events at the 1928 Summer Olympics.
