= Epke Zonderland =

Dutch gymnast

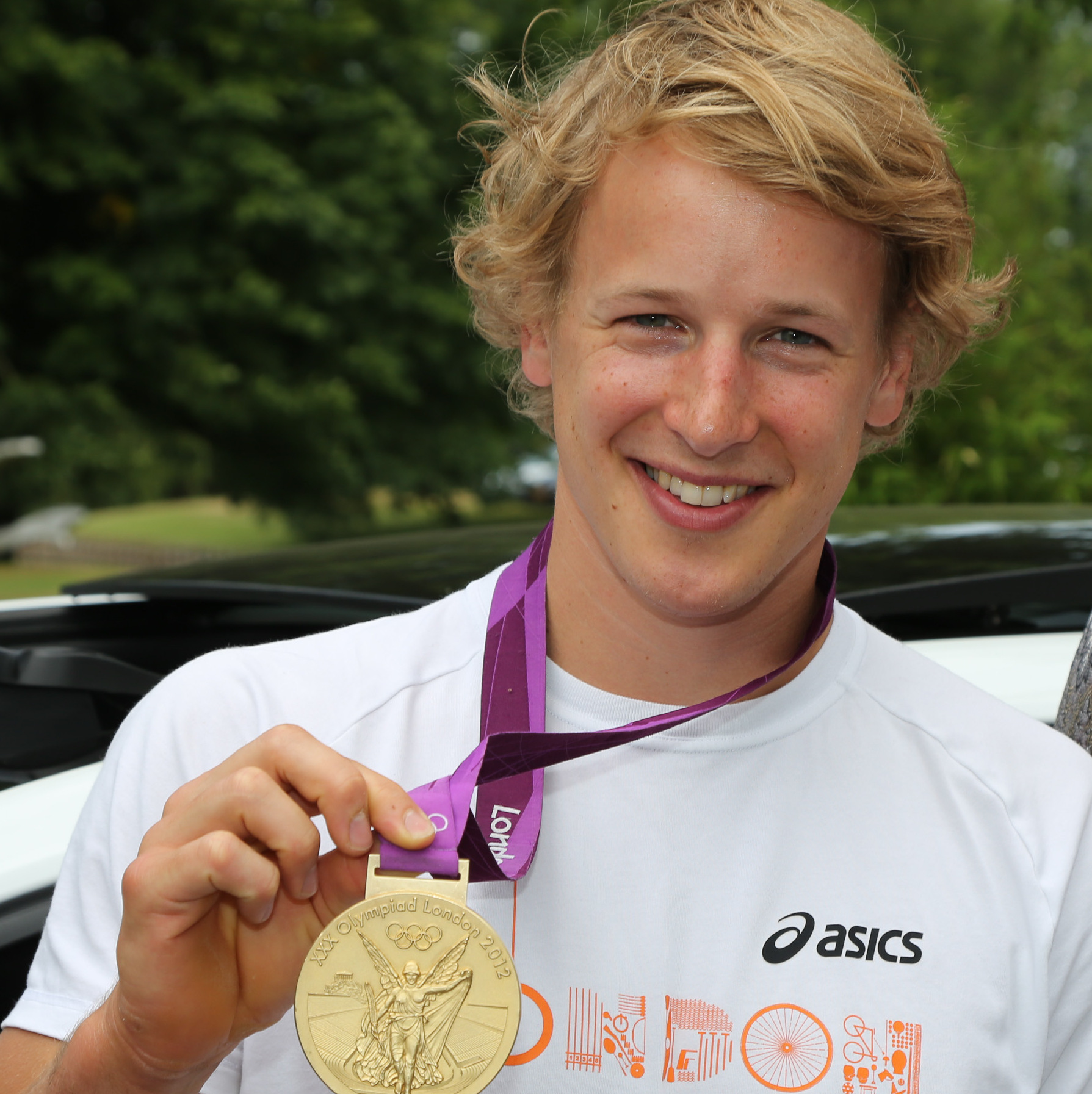
- Zonderland in 2012 after winning his London Olympics gold medal

Personal information
- Full name: Epke Jan Zonderland
- Nicknames: The Flying Dutchman; The Lion of Lemmer; Epic Zonderland; Epke Wonderland
- Born: 16 April 1986 (age 40) Lemmer, Netherlands
- Height: 173 cm (5 ft 8 in)

Gymnastics career
- Discipline: Men's artistic gymnastics
- Country represented: Netherlands
- Club: TSH Heerenveen
- Eponymous skills: Zonderland (Parallel Bars): Swing forward with 5/4 twist on one arm through handstand and Healy to support with difficulty assignment of F (0.6)
Medal record
Olympic Games
Gold medal – first place	2012 London	Horizontal Bar
World Championships
Gold medal – first place	2013 Antwerp	Horizontal Bar
Gold medal – first place	2014 Nanning	Horizontal Bar
Gold medal – first place	2018 Doha	Horizontal Bar
Silver medal – second place	2009 London	Horizontal Bar
Silver medal – second place	2010 Rotterdam	Horizontal Bar
Silver medal – second place	2017 Montreal	Horizontal Bar
World Cup Final
Gold medal – first place	2008 Madrid	Horizontal Bar
European Championships
Gold medal – first place	2011 Berlin	Horizontal Bar
Gold medal – first place	2014 Sofia	Horizontal Bar
Gold medal – first place	2019 Szczecin	Horizontal Bar
Silver medal – second place	2010 Birmingham	Horizontal Bar
Silver medal – second place	2011 Berlin	Parallel Bars
Silver medal – second place	2018 Glasgow	Horizontal Bar
Bronze medal – third place	2007 Amsterdam	Parallel Bars
Bronze medal – third place	2014 Sofia	Parallel Bars

Epke Jan Zonderland (born 16 April 1986) is a Dutch artistic gymnast and the 2012 Olympic gold medallist on high bar. He is a 4-time Olympian (2008–20) and has also taken 3 World Championships golds on high bar at the 2013, 2014 and 2018 World Championships, the first man to secure this feat on that apparatus. He is nicknamed "The Flying Dutchman.”

== Early life and education ==
Zonderland was born on 16 April 1986 in Lemmer, Netherlands. He started gymnastics at the age of four. He has two brothers (Herre and Johan) and one sister (Geeske) who are also international gymnasts.

Zonderland enrolled to study medicine at the University of Groningen in 2006. He took 12 years to complete his degree in medicine as he was pursuing his career in gymnastics at the same time, and qualified as a medical doctor in 2018.

== Gymnastics career ==
=== 2004 ===
Zonderland reached his first international success as a junior in 2004. At the European Junior Championships in Ljubljana, he was fourth in the all-around event, and he won a silver medal on the horizontal bar. That same year, he also became Dutch national all-around champion by taking over the title from his older brother Herre.

=== 2005–2006 ===
In 2005 at the World Championships in Melbourne, Zonderland and Jeffrey Wammes were the first-ever Dutch gymnasts in the history of the sport to qualify for the all-around final. Zonderland eventually ended up in the 11th position. In that same year at the European Championships, he finished 15th, which was a disappointment considering his World Championship result.

After his success in 2005, he continued in 2006 by reaching the final of the horizontal bar competition during the European Championships in Volos, where he placed 6th. At the World Cup meeting in Glasgow in the same discipline, he won the silver medal, and in Tehran, Zonderland claimed his first World Cup win and the gold medal. That year he also became Dutch national all-around champion for the second time in his career.

=== 2007-2008 ===
In 2007 he competed in both the European and the World Championships. At the European Championships in Amsterdam, he finished sixth in the individual all-around (IAA) event, the highest ever position by a Dutch gymnast. During the same Championships, he also won the bronze medal on the parallel bars. Later, in September at the World Championships in Stuttgart Zonderland finished 4th on the horizontal bar, which earned him a qualification for the 2008 Summer Olympics in Beijing. Later in 2007 he won his second World Cup event at the horizontal bar in Glasgow.

At the 2008 Summer Olympics, Zonderland reached the high bar final in which he finished seventh.

=== 2009–2011 ===
In 2009, he won the silver medal on high bar at the 2009 World Artistic Gymnastics Championships. At the 2010 World Championships in Rotterdam, he earned another silver medal on high bar. In 2011, he became European champion for the first time.

=== 2012 Olympics ===
At the 2012 Summer Olympics, Zonderland won an Olympic gold medal in the high bar with a personal best score of 16.533. His routine included a triple combo of Cassina-Kovacs-Kolman, then the most difficult release combination. His performance was regarded by many as one of the top performances of the 2012 games. The first Dutch gymnast (male or female) to win an individual Olympic medal, he also won the first Olympic gymnastics medal in 84 years for the Netherlands.

=== 2013–2014 ===
At the 2013 World Championships in Antwerp, Zonderland became world champion for the first time. He performed a double combo of Cassina-Kovacs followed by Kolman-Gaylord 2 with a stuck double-twisting double layout dismount.

In 2014, Zonderland won the championship title again on high bar at the 2014 European Championships in Sofia, Bulgaria. He also successfully defended his world title at the 2014 World Gymnastics Championships in Nanning, China.

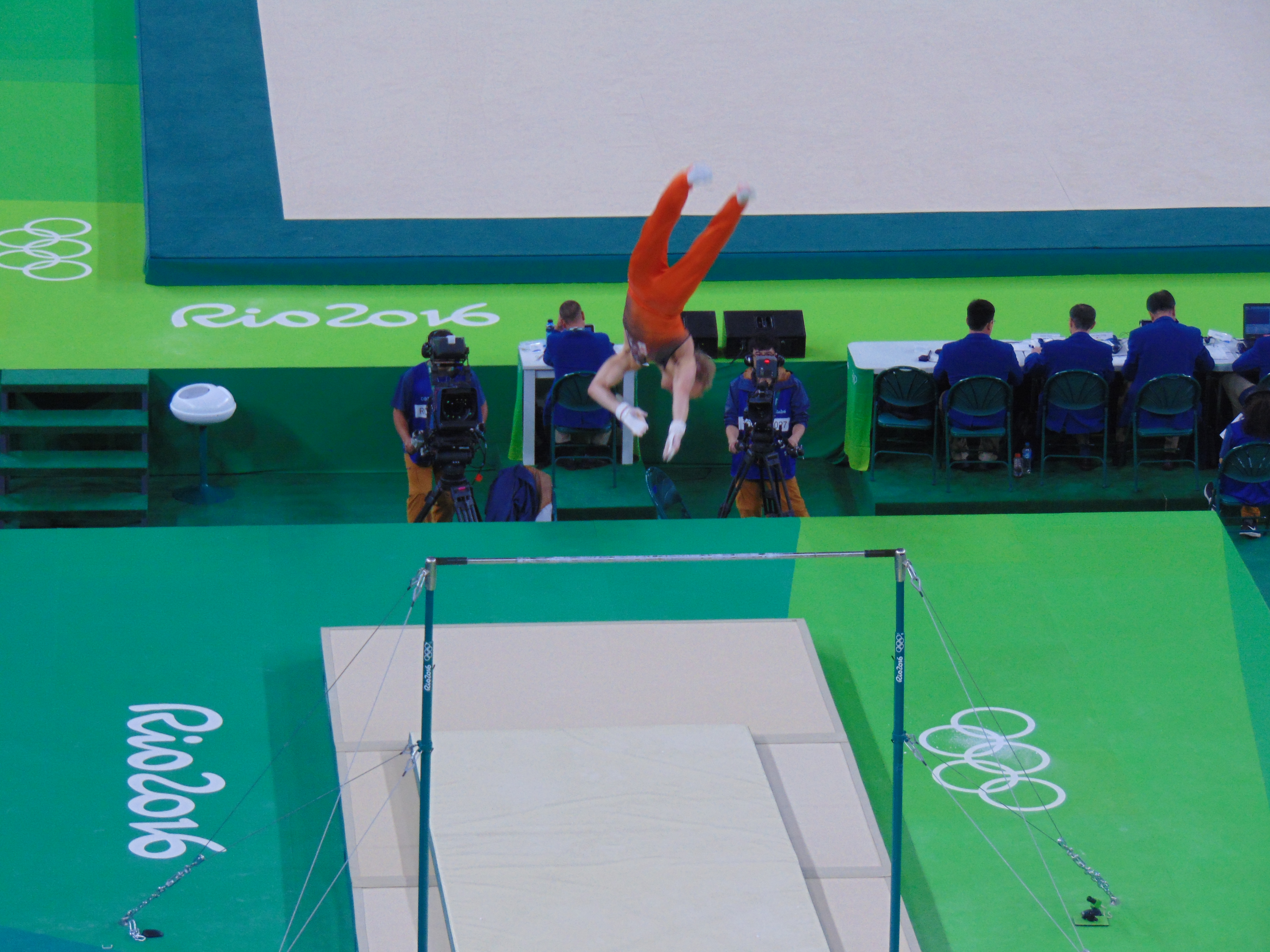
Zonderland at the 2016 Summer Olympics

=== 2015–2017 ===
In April 2015, Zonderland failed to defend the European title after falling off the high bar. In August 2015, he fell in training, which left him with a concussion and an injury to his thumb. The injury curtailed his training times and he failed to make the final to defend his world title at the 2015 World Championship in Glasgow.

In 2016, Zonderland sprained his fingers again during training in June, just before the 2016 Summer Olympics. He failed to defend his Olympic title at the Olympics after falling in his high bar routine.

On 16–17 September 2017, Zonderland competed at the 2017 Paris Challenge Cup in France, where he won gold in the high bar individual event, scoring 14.800. He then competed at the 2017 World Championships in Montreal. In the high bar event final, he caught the bar with just one hand after a flight element, but managed to stay on with only his right hand to swing into a giant despite glaring leg separation, and successfully finished his routine. He earned a silver medal, scoring 14.233.

=== 2018–2019 ===
On 9–12 August 2018, Zonderland competed at the 2018 European Artistic Gymnastics Championships in Glasgow, Scotland, where he won the silver medal—thanks heavily to his top D-score of 6.8 that was at least ½ a point more than the next highest finalist's D-score—behind Oliver Hegi of Switzerland. At the 2018 World Championships in Doha, Qatar, Zonderland won gold on the high bar at the age of 32. His routine included two double release combinations, a Cassina to Kovacs, followed by a Kolman-Gaylord 2. He became the first man to win three high bar gold medals at the World Championships.

Zonderland competed down under at the 2019 Melbourne World Cup in Melbourne, Australia, from 21 to 24 February 2019. He and Hidetaka Miyachi of Japan scored identical highest combined scores of 14.733 in the individual horizontal bar apparatus final. However, after activating the tiebreak procedure, Zonderland was relegated to the silver medal because Miyachi's execution score was higher than his own. Also, between 10 and 14 April 2019, at the European Artistic Gymnastics Championships–an FIG championship held in Szczecin, Poland—Zonderland won his third European gold medal in the individual horizontal bar apparatus final. However, he failed to qualify for the same event final at the 2019 World Artistic Gymnastics Championships in Stuttgart after an error in his routine.

=== 2020/2021 Olympics ===
At the 2020 Summer Olympics in Tokyo, Japan, Zonderland did not qualify for the individual horizontal bar finals after ranking 23rd with a score of 13.833 due to a fall in the qualification rounds.

== Awards and honours ==
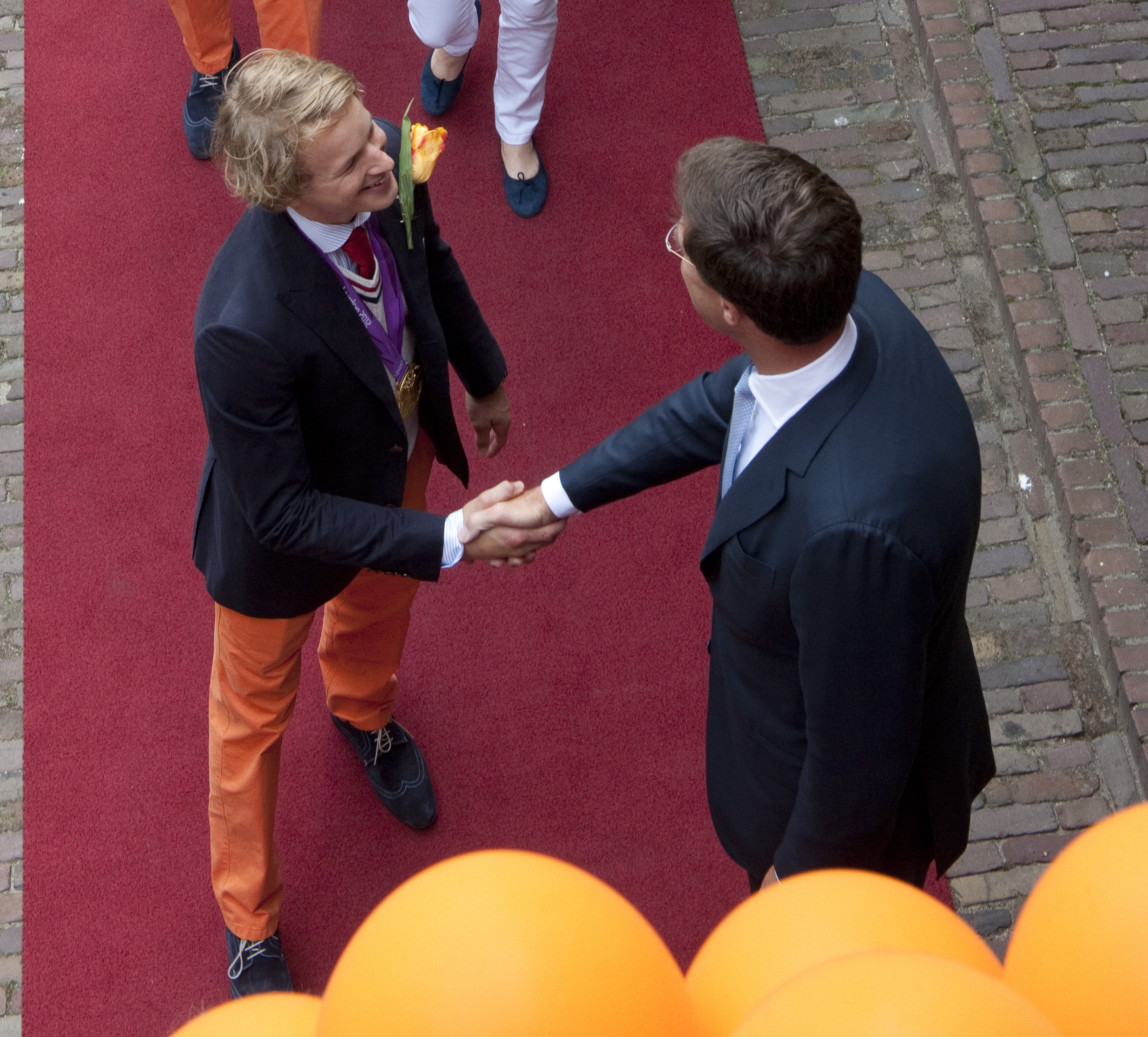
Zonderland being received by the Dutch Prime Minister Mark Rutte prior to the ceremony at Torentje in 2012

Zonderland was named Dutch Sportsman of the year in 2009 for his silver medal in high bar at the 2009 World Championships. He was selected Sportsman of the Year for a second time in 2011 after he won the European Championships, then again for the next two consecutive years after he won the 2012 Olympic and the 2013 World Championships. In 2012, Zonderland was appointed a Knight of the Order of Orange-Nassau in recognition of his Olympic championship victory on the horizontal bar at the Summer Olympics in London.

== Personal life ==
Zonderland married Linda Steen in September 2016. Their son, Bert Eize, was born on 13 October 2018, and a second son Jan was born on 1 April 2021. On 1 November 2022, their third child, daughter Sophie, was born.

== Competitive history ==
Competitive history of Epke Zonderland
Year	Event	Team	AA	FX	PH	SR	VT	PB	HB
2004
2004	Junior European Championships	15	4						2nd place, silver medalist(s)
2005
2005	European Championships		15						
2005	World Championships	—N/a	11						
2006	Tehran World Cup								1st place, gold medalist(s)
2006	European Championships								6
2006	Glasgow World Cup								2nd place, silver medalist(s)
2007
2007	European Championships		6					3rd place, bronze medalist(s)	
2007	World Championships								4
2008
2008	Olympic Games								7
2008	World Cup Final								1st place, gold medalist(s)
2009	Cottbus World Cup								2nd place, silver medalist(s)
2009	European Championships								5
2009	Maribor World Cup							3rd place, bronze medalist(s)	1st place, gold medalist(s)
2009	Glasgow World Cup								1st place, gold medalist(s)
2009	Moscow World Cup							3rd place, bronze medalist(s)	1st place, gold medalist(s)
2009	Doha World Cup								1st place, gold medalist(s)
2009	World Championships	—N/a							2nd place, silver medalist(s)
2009	Stuttgart World Cup								1st place, gold medalist(s)
2010	Cottbus World Cup							2nd place, silver medalist(s)	1st place, gold medalist(s)
2010	Doha World Cup								1st place, gold medalist(s)
2010	European Championships								2nd place, silver medalist(s)
2010	World Championships								2nd place, silver medalist(s)
2011	Paris World Challenge Cup							3rd place, bronze medalist(s)	1st place, gold medalist(s)
2011	European Championships							2nd place, silver medalist(s)	1st place, gold medalist(s)
2011	Moscow World Cup								1st place, gold medalist(s)
2011	World Championships	19							5
2012	Olympic Test Event							2nd place, silver medalist(s)	
2012	Cottbus World Challenge Cup								1st place, gold medalist(s)
2012	Maribor World Challenge Cup								1st place, gold medalist(s)
2012	Ghent World Challenge Cup							2nd place, silver medalist(s)	1st place, gold medalist(s)
2012	Olympic Games								1st place, gold medalist(s)
2013
2013	World Championships	—N/a							1st place, gold medalist(s)
2014	Doha World Challenge Cup							1st place, gold medalist(s)	1st place, gold medalist(s)
2014	Ljubljana World Challenge Cup							2nd place, silver medalist(s)	1st place, gold medalist(s)
2014	European Championships							3rd place, bronze medalist(s)	1st place, gold medalist(s)
2014	World Championships	18							1st place, gold medalist(s)
2015	Cottbus World Challenge Cup							3rd place, bronze medalist(s)	4
2015	Ljubljana World Challenge Cup							7	1st place, gold medalist(s)
2015	World Championships	11							
2016	Olympic Test Event	3rd place, bronze medalist(s)							1st place, gold medalist(s)
2016	Olympic Games	10							7
2017	Varna World Challenge Cup							5	
2017	Paris World Challenge Cup							7	1st place, gold medalist(s)
2017	World Championships	—N/a							2nd place, silver medalist(s)
2018	Koper World Challenge Cup								4
2018	European Championships	R1							2nd place, silver medalist(s)
2018	World Championships	8							1st place, gold medalist(s)
2018	Cottbus World Cup								1st place, gold medalist(s)
2019	Melbourne World Cup								2nd place, silver medalist(s)
2019	Baku World Cup								1st place, gold medalist(s)
2019	Doha World Cup								7
2019	European Championships								1st place, gold medalist(s)
2019	World Championships	19							
2020	Melbourne World Cup								1st place, gold medalist(s)
2020	Baku World Cup								2 (Note: Event finals were cancelled and qualification results were used as final results)
2021
2021	Olympic Games								23

Awards
Preceded by Maarten van der Weijden; Mark Tuitert	Dutch Sportsman of the Year; 2009; 2011–2013	Succeeded by Mark Tuitert; Arjen Robben
