= Albert Neumann =

Luxembourgish gymnast (1899–1976)

- Full name: J. Albert Neumann
- Born: 19 October 1899 Troisvierges, Luxembourg
- Died: 1 March 1976 (aged 76)

Gymnastics career
- Discipline: Men's artistic gymnastics
- Country represented: Luxembourg

J. Albert Neumann (19 October 1899 – 1 March 1976) was a Luxembourgish gymnast. He competed at the 1924 Summer Olympics and the 1928 Summer Olympics.
