= Kalervo Kinos =

Finnish gymnast (1906–1984)

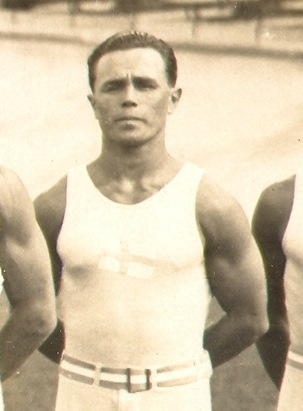
- Kinos in 1928

Personal information
- Full name: Kaiku Kalervo Kinos
- Born: 16 January 1906 Tampere, Grand Duchy of Finland, Russian Empire
- Died: 24 January 1984 (aged 78) Hyvinkää, Finland

Gymnastics career
- Discipline: Men's artistic gymnastics
- Country represented: Finland

Kaiku Kalervo Kinos (16 January 1906 – 24 January 1984) was a Finnish gymnast. He competed in seven events at the 1928 Summer Olympics.
