= Harold Newhart =

American gymnast (1903–1977)

Personal information
- Full name: Harold Guthrie Newhart
- Born: July 19, 1903 Parkersburg, West Virginia, U.S.
- Died: March 31, 1977 (aged 73) Oxford, Ohio, U.S.

Gymnastics career
- Discipline: Men's artistic gymnastics
- Country represented: United States

Harold Guthrie Newhart (July 19, 1903 – March 31, 1977) was an American gymnast. He was the all-around intercollegiate champion in 1927 and later became a member of the United States men's national artistic gymnastics team, competing in all seven events at the 1928 Summer Olympics. His best individual finish was 10th on the horse vault. Newhart attended the US Naval Academy, graduating in 1927, and is honored in the Navy Athletics Hall of Fame. He was a career Marine Corps officer, eventually reaching the rank of colonel, and served with distinction during World War II and the Korean War. Newhart is buried in Section 59 at Arlington National Cemetery.
