= Gilbert Raynes =

British gymnast (1903–1986)

- Full name: Gilbert Charles Raynes
- Born: 21 August 1903 Wolverhampton, England
- Died: 17 June 1986 (aged 82) Bath, Somerset, England

Gymnastics career
- Discipline: Men's artistic gymnastics
- Country represented: (United Kingdom) Great Britain

Gilbert Charles Raynes (21 August 1903 – 17 June 1986) was a British gymnast. He competed in seven events at the 1928 Summer Olympics.
