= Yuri van Gelder =

Dutch gymnast (born 1983)

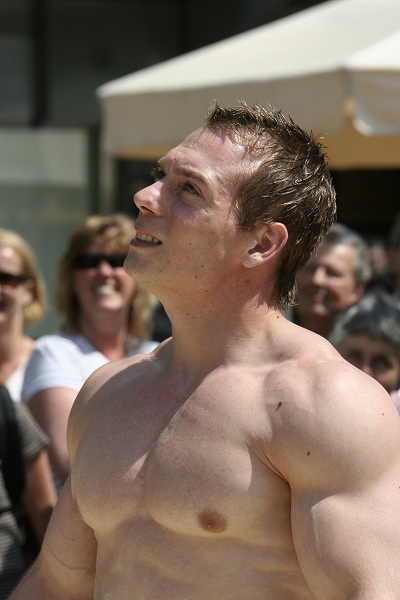
- Van Gelder in 2008.

Personal information
- Nickname: Lord of the Rings
- Born: 20 April 1983 (age 43) Waalwijk, North Brabant, Netherlands
- Height: 1.61 m (5 ft 3 in)

Gymnastics career
- Discipline: Men's artistic gymnastics
- Country represented: Netherlands
- Club: Flik-Flak 's-Hertogenbosch
- Eponymous skills: From planche, lower horizontally and slowly to hanging scale rw. and press to swallow (2 s.) or from swallow same to planche or planche to planche.
Medal record
World Championships
Gold medal – first place	2005 Melbourne	Rings
Silver medal – second place	2007 Stuttgart	Rings
Bronze medal – third place	2006 Aarhus	Rings
European Championships
Gold medal – first place	2004 Ljubljana	Rings
Gold medal – first place	2005 Debrecen	Rings
Gold medal – first place	2008 Lausanne	Rings
Gold medal – first place	2009 Milan	Rings

Yuri van Gelder (born 20 April 1983) is a Dutch gymnast, whose best discipline is the rings. His nickname is "Lord of the Rings".

== Gymnastics career ==
Born in Waalwijk, Netherlands, Van Gelder took the gold in the men's rings at the 2005 European Championships held in Debrecen, Hungary. He became world champion in the same discipline at the 2005 World Artistic Gymnastics Championships in Melbourne, Australia. He won bronze at the 2006 World Artistic Gymnastics Championships in Aarhus, Denmark. At the 2007 World Artistic Gymnastics Championships in Stuttgart, Germany, he won a silver medal.

=== Suspension ===
On 13 July 2009, he revealed that he used cocaine three days before the Dutch championships in Rotterdam. Van Gelder said he very much regretted his "lapse" and called himself "incredibly stupid". He has since had to return his national championship gold medal and was suspended by the Dutch Gymnastics Union. IOC regulations implied that because of the suspension, he would not be admitted to the Olympic Games in 2012. He was also fired from his job with the Dutch military, which has a 'zero tolerance' drug policy.

He was pulled out of the 2010 Worlds a few days before the start, with the team citing personal medical reasons and refusing to answer questions about drugs.

In 2011, there was an appeal by LaShawn Merritt at the Court of Arbitration for Sport against the general rule that after a suspension, the athlete is not allowed to participate in the next Olympic Games. The appeal was granted, and thereby Van Gelder still had a chance to qualify. For this, he had to achieve a good result at the 2011 World Artistic Gymnastics Championships, but he was unsuccessful.

=== 2016 Olympic Games ===
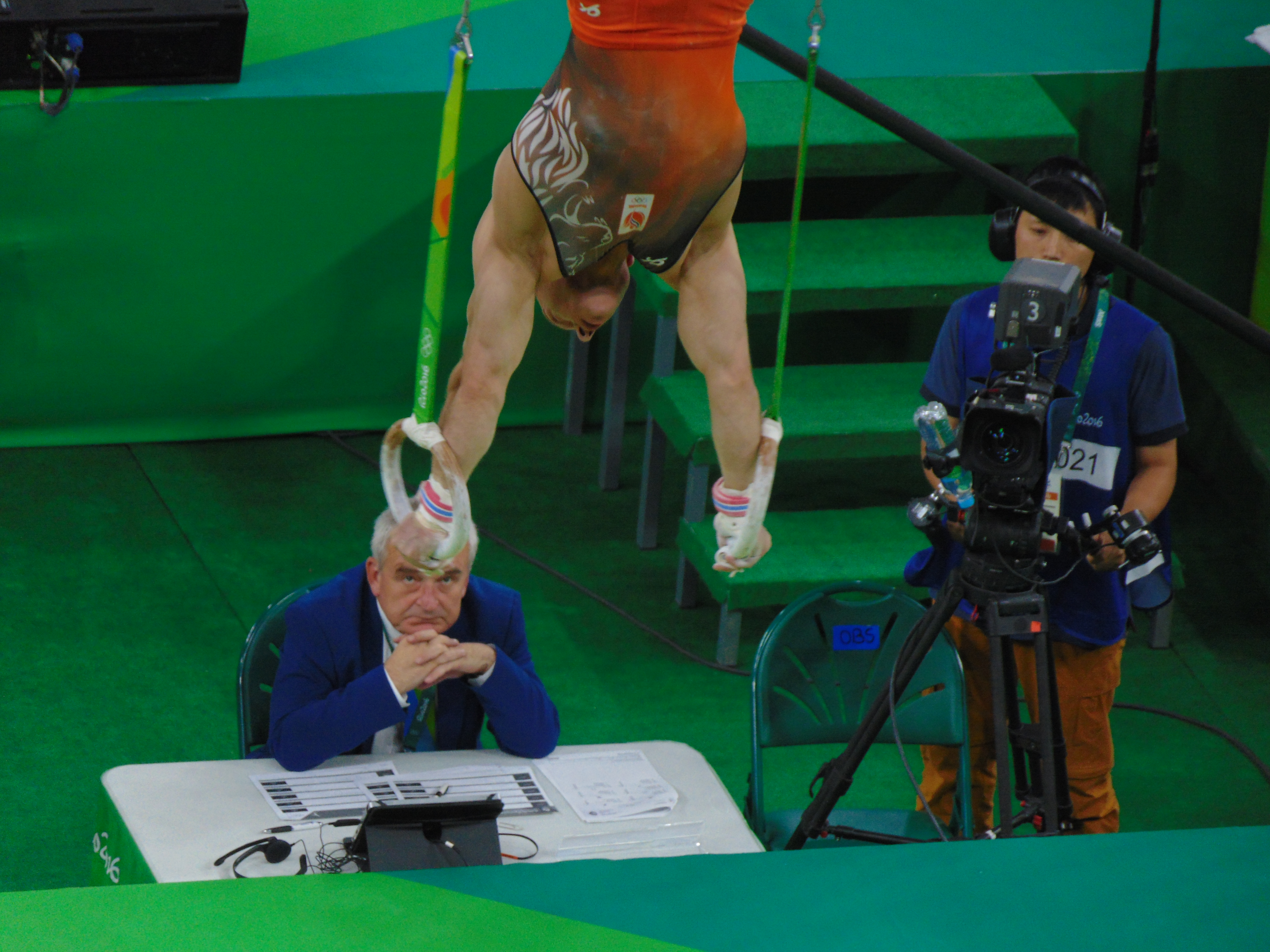
Van Gelder performing at the Olympics in the qualification

At the 2016 Summer Olympics, he reached the finals on rings. On 8 August 2016 (one week before the finals), he was dismissed from the Dutch team as a disciplinary measure, because against team rules he had not returned to the Olympic Village until early the next morning after consuming alcohol off-premises. As a variation on his nickname "lord of the rings", the Dutch media immediately referred to Van Gelder as "lord of the drinks". A request for a preliminary injunction requiring that the National Olympic Committee would attempt to reinstate Van Gelder's position in the finals was rejected.

Awards
Preceded by Pieter van den Hoogenband	Dutch Sportsman of the year 2005	Succeeded by Theo Bos
