= Birger Stenman (gymnast) =

Finnish gymnast

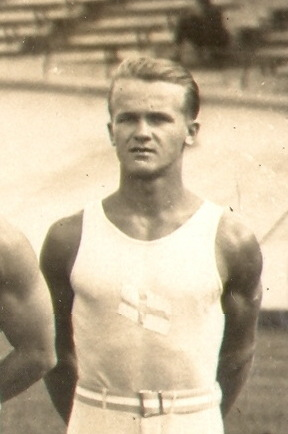
- Stenman in 1928

Personal information
- Full name: Birger Erland Stenman
- Born: 9 October 1909 Viipuri, Grand Duchy of Finland, Russian Empire
- Died: 24 April 1989 (aged 79) Kotka, Finland

Gymnastics career
- Discipline: Men's artistic gymnastics
- Country represented: Finland

Birger Erland Stenman (9 October 1909 – 24 April 1989) was a Finnish gymnast. He competed in seven events at the 1928 Summer Olympics.
