= Elias Melkman =

Dutch gymnast

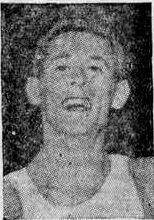
- Melkman in a newspaper from 1930

Personal information
- Full name: Elias Hijman Melkman
- Born: 24 May 1903 Amsterdam, Netherlands
- Died: 3 January 1942 (aged 38) Oświęcim, Poland

Gymnastics career
- Discipline: Men's artistic gymnastics
- Country represented: Netherlands

Elias Hijman Melkman (24 May 1903 – 3 January 1942) was a Dutch gymnast. He competed in seven events at the 1928 Summer Olympics. He was killed in the Auschwitz concentration camp during World War II.
