= Ladislav Tikal =

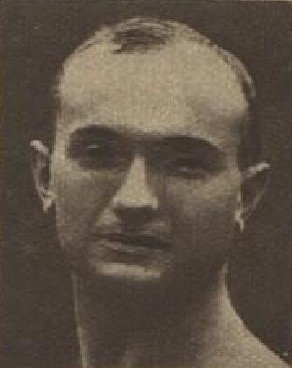
- Tikal c. 1928

Personal information
- Born: 25 May 1905 Soběslav, Bohemia, Austria-Hungary
- Died: 30 June 1980 (aged 75) Prague, Czechoslovakia

Gymnastics career
- Discipline: Men's artistic gymnastics
- Country represented: Czechoslovakia
Medal record
Men's artistic gymnastics
Representing Czechoslovakia
Olympic Games
Silver medal – second place	1928 Amsterdam	Team

Ladislav Tikal (25 May 1905 – 30 June 1980) was a Czech gymnast who competed for Czechoslovakia in the 1928 Summer Olympics.
