= 1982 in the United Kingdom =

Events from the year 1982 in the United Kingdom. The year was dominated by the Falklands War.

== Incumbents ==
- Monarch – Elizabeth II
- Prime Minister – Margaret Thatcher (Conservative)

== Events ==
=== January ===
- 1 January – ITV launches three regional TV stations – Central, TVS (Television South) and TSW (Television South West), replacing ATV Midlands, Southern Television and Westward Television respectively.
- 2 January
  - The Welsh Army of Workers claims responsibility for a bomb explosion at the Birmingham headquarters of Severn Trent Water.
  - British Rail retires its last Class 55 Deltic diesel-electric locomotives from service.
- 10–15 January – The lowest ever UK temperature of −27.2 °C is recorded at Braemar, in Aberdeenshire. This equals the record set in the same place in 1895, and the record will be equalled again at Altnaharra in 1995.
- 11 January – Mark Thatcher, son of the Prime Minister Margaret Thatcher, disappears in the Sahara desert during the Paris-Dakar rally.
- 14 January – Mark Thatcher is found safe and well in the Sahara, six days after going missing.
- 18 January – "A Complaint of Rape", the third episode of BBC One fly on the wall documentary Police, showing police treating a female complainant dismissively, is broadcast, leading to changes in police treatment of rape allegations.
- 21 January – Miners vote against strike action and accept the National Coal Board offer of a 9.3% pay rise.
- 26 January – Unemployment in the United Kingdom is recorded at over 3,000,000 people for the first time since the 1930s. However, the 11.5% of the workforce currently unemployed is approximately half of the record percentage which was reached half a century ago.

=== February ===
- February – Korean cars are imported to Britain for the first time with the launch of the Hyundai Pony, a range of three and five-door hatchbacks similar in size to the Ford Escort.
- 1 February – Sales of tabloid newspapers are reported to have been boosted substantially since last summer by the introduction of bingo. The Sun has reportedly enjoyed the biggest rise in sales, now selling more than 4,000,000 copies a day on a regular basis.
- 5 February – Laker Airways collapses, leaving 6,000 passengers stranded, with debts of £270,000,000.
- 6 February – The Queen commemorates her Pearl Jubilee.
- 12 February – Opening of the first Next clothing store, a rebranding of the merged Joseph Hepworth and Kendall chains masterminded by George Davies. It specialises in women's clothing.
- 19 February – The DeLorean car factory in Belfast is put into receivership.
- 22 February – The Apostolic Delegation is promoted to the Apostolic Nunciature to Great Britain by Pope John Paul II; the first pro-nuncio is Bruno Heim.
- 23 February – The Glasgow-registered coal ship St. Bedan is bombed and sunk by an IRA unit driving a hijacked pilot boat on Lough Foyle in Northern Ireland.
- 25 February – The European Court of Justice rules that schools in Britain cannot allow corporal punishment against the wishes of parents.
- 27 February – The D'Oyly Carte Opera Company gives its last Gilbert and Sullivan performance at the end of a final London season, having been in near-continuous existence since 1875.

=== March ===
- 3 March – The Queen opens the Barbican Centre, a performing arts venue in the City of London.
- 12 March – Closure of Queen Street Mill, Burnley, the last steam-driven weaving shed to work commercially.
- 18 March
  - A legal case brought by Mary Whitehouse against the National Theatre concerning alleged obscenity in the play The Romans in Britain ends after the Attorney General intervenes.
  - An Argentine scrap metal dealer raises the Argentine flag in South Georgia, Falkland Islands – a British overseas colony.
- 19 March – Argentines land on South Georgia Island, precipitating the Falklands War.
- 25 March – The Hillhead by-election in Glasgow is held as a result of the death of sitting Conservative MP Sir Tam Galbraith on 2 January. It is won by Roy Jenkins for the Social Democratic Party, whose dream of an electoral breakthrough looks strong as they still head most of the opinion polls.
- 29 March – Royal assent in London to the Canada Act 1982 sets the stage for the repatriation of the Canadian Constitution.

=== April ===
- 1 April – A twelve-year-old unnamed Birmingham boy becomes one of the youngest people in England and Wales to be convicted of murder after he admits murdering an eight-year-old boy, and is sentenced to be detained indefinitely.
- 2 April – Falklands War begins as Argentina invades the Falkland Islands.
- 4 April – Falklands War: The British Falkland Islands government surrenders, placing the islands in Argentine control.
- 5 April – Falklands War: Royal Navy task force sets sail to the Falklands from Portsmouth.
- 7 April – Britain declares a 200-mile "exclusion zone" around the Falklands.
- 15 April – Actor Arthur Lowe dies suddenly of a stroke aged 66 after collapsing in his dressing room at The Alexandra, Birmingham, the previous day.
- 17 April – By proclamation of the Queen of Canada on Parliament Hill, Canada repatriates its constitution, granting full political independence from the United Kingdom; included is the country's first entrenched bill of rights.
- 21 April – Walsall F.C.'s hopes of becoming the first Football League club to ground-share are dashed when officials condemn their plans to sell their Fellows Park stadium and become tenants at the Molineux (home of Wolverhampton Wanderers).
- 23 April
  - The first British serviceman dies in the Falklands conflict, when his Sea King helicopter crashes.
- 24 April
  - The Eurovision Song Contest is held in Harrogate, Yorkshire and is won by Germany.
- 25 April – Falklands War: Royal Marines recapture South Georgia.
- 29 April – Daniel and Christopher Smith, Britain's first twins conceived through in vitro fertilisation, are born to Josephine and Stewart Smith at the Royal Free Hospital in London.
- 30 April – The Conservatives return to the top of the opinion polls for the first time since late-1979, with the latest MORI poll showing that they have 43% of the vote, ahead of the SDP–Liberal Alliance.

=== May ===
- 1 May – Falklands War: Operation Black Buck – A Royal Air Force Vulcan bomber takes off from Ascension Island and bombs Port Stanley Airport.
- 2 May – Falklands War: nuclear submarine HMS Conqueror sinks the Argentine cruiser General Belgrano.
- 3 May – The cruise ship Queen Elizabeth 2 is converted into a troop ship to help in the Falklands War.
- 4 May – Falklands War: Type 42 destroyer HMS Sheffield is badly damaged by an Exocet missile. It sinks on 10 May.
- 21 May
  - Falklands War: Royal Marines and paratroopers from the British Task Force land at San Carlos Bay on the Falkland Islands and raise the Union Jack.
  - The Haçienda nightclub opens in Manchester.
- 21 May – Falklands War: frigate HMS Ardent is sunk by Argentine aircraft in Falkland Sound, killing 22 sailors.
- 22 May – FA Cup holders Tottenham Hotspur draw 1–1 with Queen's Park Rangers in the Wembley final, forcing a replay. Tottenham are without their Argentine players Ossie Ardiles and Ricardo Villa, who have been temporarily removed from the team following barracking from rival fans over their home country's involvement in the war with Britain.
- 23 May – Falklands War: frigate HMS Antelope is hit by Argentine aircraft and explodes.
- 25 May – Falklands War: destroyer HMS Coventry and requisitioned container ship SS Atlantic Conveyor are sunk; Coventry by two Argentine A-4C Skyhawks and Atlantic Conveyor by two Exocets.
- 26 May – Official opening of Kielder Water, a reservoir in Northumberland. It is the largest artificial lake in the UK by capacity (200 billion litres) and is surrounded by Kielder Forest; the largest planted woodland in Europe.
- 27 May
  - The Beaconsfield by-election is held as a result of the death of sitting Conservative MP Sir Ronald Bell on 27 February. Tim Smith retains the seat for the Conservatives with a comfortable majority of 13,053 votes against the SDP–Liberal Alliance candidate Paul Tyler. Future Labour Prime Minister, Tony Blair finishes in third place with 3,886 votes, the only election of his political career that he will lose.
  - Tottenham Hotspur win the FA Cup beating Queens Park Rangers 1–0 in a replay. A sixth-minute penalty from Glenn Hoddle is the only goal of the game which equals Aston Villa's record of seven FA Cup triumphs.
- 28 May
  - Pope John Paul II's visit to the United Kingdom, the first by a reigning pope, begins at Gatwick Airport; he later meets the Queen in London.
  - Falklands War: Battle of Goose Green commences, the first land battle of the war. Lieutenant-Colonel H. Jones is killed in an action for which he is awarded a posthumous Victoria Cross. British troops reach Darwin, Falkland Islands.
- 29 May
  - Pope John Paul II's visit to the UK. Pope John Paul II visits Canterbury, the first time a pontiff has done so.
  - Falklands War: Battle of Goose Green concludes when British paratroopers defeat a larger force of Argentine troops.
- 31 May – Falklands War: Battle of Stanley.
- May – Alternative rock band The Smiths formed in Manchester by Johnny Marr and Morrissey.

=== June ===
- June – All restrictions on hire purchase lifted.
- 3 June
  - Israeli ambassador to the UK Shlomo Argov is shot in London, an event which provokes the 1982 Lebanon War; he dies in 2003 in Israel without regaining full consciousness.
  - The Mitcham and Morden by-election is held as a result of the sitting Labour MP (Bruce Douglas-Mann) transferring his allegiance to the new SDP. Angela Rumbold gains the seat for the Conservatives, the first gain achieved by a ruling party at a by-election since 1961 and the last until 2017.
- 8 June
  - U.S. President Ronald Reagan becomes the first American chief executive to address a joint session of Parliament.
  - Falklands War: 48 British servicemen are killed when two supply ships are bombed by Argentine air strikes off Bluff Cove.
- 9 June – Twenty pence coin first issued into circulation.
- 11-12 June – Falklands War: Last battles of the war, at Mount Longdon, Mount Harriet and Two Sisters. Sergeant Ian McKay is killed at Mount Longdon, after which he is awarded a posthumous Victoria Cross.
- 14 June – Falklands War ends as British forces reach the outskirts of Stanley after "yomping" across East Falkland from San Carlos Bay. They arrive to find the Argentine forces flying white flags of surrender. The formal Argentine surrender in the Falklands War is signed this evening.
- 16 June – Welsh miners go on strike to support health workers demanding a 12% pay rise.
- 19 June – The body of "God's Banker", Roberto Calvi, chairman of Banco Ambrosiano, is found hanging beneath Blackfriars Bridge in London.
- 21 June – The first child of The Prince and Princess of Wales is born at St Mary's Hospital, London (Paddington), the first birth in direct line of succession to the British throne to take place in a hospital.
- 22 June – A British Airways Boeing 747 suffers a temporary four-engine flameout and damage to the exterior of the plane, after flying through the otherwise undetected ash plume from Indonesia's Galunggung.
- 23 June – Support for the Conservative government continues to rise, mainly due to the success of the Falklands campaign, with a MORI opinion poll showing that they have a 51% approval rating.
- 24 June – The Coatbridge and Airdrie by-election in Scotland is held as a result of the death of sitting Labour MP James Dempsey on 12 May; Tom Clarke holds the seat for Labour.
- 25 June – Northern Ireland defeat hosts Spain 1–0 in the World Cup, later being knocked out in the quarter-finals.

=== July ===
- 2 July – Roy Jenkins is elected as Leader of the SDP (Social Democratic Party).
- 3 July – ASLEF train drivers in the United Kingdom go on strike over hours of work, returning to work on July 18.
- 4 July – Fugitive murderer Barry Prudom, 37, commits suicide at Malton to escape arrest after a 17-day manhunt by North Yorkshire Police.
- 5 July – England draw 0–0 with hosts Spain and are eliminated from the World Cup in the second group stage. Ron Greenwood retires as England manager after five years and is succeeded by Ipswich Town manager Bobby Robson.
- 9 July – Michael Fagan breaks into Buckingham Palace and is apprehended after entering the royal bedroom.
- 15 July – Geoffrey Prime, a British GCHQ civil servant, is remanded in custody on charges under the Official Secrets Act 1911.
- 19 July – Home Secretary William Whitelaw announces that Michael Trestrail (the Queen's bodyguard) has resigned from the Metropolitan Police Service over a relationship with a male prostitute.
- 20 July – Hyde Park and Regents Park bombings: the Provisional IRA detonates two bombs in Central London, killing eight soldiers, wounding 47 people, and leading to the deaths of seven horses.
- 21 July – HMS Hermes, the Royal Navy flagship during the Falklands War, returns home to Portsmouth to a hero's welcome.
- 22 July
  - Production of the Ford Cortina ends after twenty years and five generations, the final two of which were virtually identical. The Cortina's successor, the Sierra, will be built at Dagenham and in Belgium and will go on sale in the Autumn, though in slightly lower volumes than the smaller Escort which is now Ford's best-selling car.
  - Exclusion zone around the Falklands is lifted.
  - Margaret Thatcher rejects calls in parliament for a return of the death penalty for terrorist murder.
- 23 July – A coroner's jury returns a verdict of suicide on Roberto Calvi.

=== August ===
- 1 August – The government creates Britoil as the privatised successor to the British National Oil Corporation.
- 3 August – The Queen Elizabeth 2 returns to civilian use.
- 4 August – The first child of The Prince and Princess of Wales is christened William Arthur Philip Louis.
- 6 August – The Kessock Bridge in Inverness is opened by the Queen Mother.
- 28 August – Caryl Churchill's play Top Girls premieres at the Royal Court Theatre, London.
- 29 August – 65-year-old American Ashby Harper becomes the oldest person to swim the English Channel.
- 30 August – St David's Hall opens in Cardiff as the National Concert Hall and Conference Centre of Wales.

=== September ===
- 5 September – Air ace and war hero Sir Douglas Bader dies suddenly of heart failure aged 72 whilst being driven through Chiswick, London.
- 7 September – Prime Minister Margaret Thatcher expresses her concern at the growing number of children living in single-parent families, but says that she is not opposed to divorce.
- 16 September – The Gower by-election in Wales is held as a result of the death of sitting Labour MP Ifor Davies on 6 June; Gareth Wardell holds the seat for Labour.
- 22 September – An estimated 14% of the workforce is now reported to be unemployed.
- 23 September – Nigel Lawson announces that no industry should remain in state ownership unless there is an "overwhelming" case.
- 27 September – General Motors launches the Spanish-built Opel Corsa which will be sold in Britain from April next year as the Vauxhall Nova. The new front-wheel drive range of small hatchbacks and saloons will effectively replace the Chevette. However, the transport workers union has thrown the future of the new car which is expected to sell around 50,000 units a year, into jeopardy by blocking imports to Britain.
- 30 September
  - Lord Denning delivers his last judgement as Master of the Rolls.
  - After well over 100 years, the UK Inland Telegram service closes. Telegram figures peaked after the First World War with over 100m sent annually; by the time the service closes the annual figure is down to less than 3 million.

=== October ===
- 8 October – With the economy now climbing out of recession after more than two years, Margaret Thatcher vows to stick to her neoliberal economic policies, and blames previous governments for the decline that she inherited when entering power more than three years ago.
- 11 October – The Mary Rose, flagship of Henry VIII of England that sank in 1545, is raised from the Solent.
- 12 October – The London Victory Parade of 1982 is held to mark the end of the Falklands war.
- 15 October – The Ford Sierra is launched as a replacement for the long-running Cortina and its ultra-modern aerodynamic styling causes controversy among potential buyers who for years had been drawn to the conventional Cortina but it soon goes on to be a sales success.
- 21 October – Sinn Féin win their first seats on the Northern Ireland Assembly, with Gerry Adams winning the Belfast West seat.
- 27 October
  - The Homosexual Offences (Northern Ireland) Order 1982 comes into effect, decriminalising homosexuality in Northern Ireland for those aged 18 or older.
  - Three RUC officers are killed by an IRA bomb near Lurgan in Northern Ireland.
- 28 October – By-elections are held in Birmingham Northfield and Peckham as a result of the deaths of sitting Conservative MP Jocelyn Cadbury on 31 July and sitting Labour MP Harry Lamborn on 21 August. In a blow to the ruling Conservatives, Labour win both by-elections; the new MPs are John Spellar and Harriet Harman.

=== November ===
- November – The Government announces that more than 400,000 council houses have been sold off under the right-to-buy scheme within the last three years.
- 1 November
  - The Welsh language television station, S4C, launches in Wales. The first programme broadcast being SuperTed.
  - Opinion polls show the Conservatives still firmly in the lead, suggesting that a general election will be held by next summer.
- 2 November – The fourth terrestrial television channel, Channel 4, begins broadcasting, the first programme broadcast being the game show Countdown, hosted by Richard Whiteley. Another flagship programme is the Liverpool-based soap opera Brookside.
- 7 November – The Thames Barrier is first publicly demonstrated.
- 12 November – Express Lift Tower in Northampton officially opened.
- 15 November – Unemployment remains in excess of 3,000,000 people – 13.8% of the workforce.
- 16 November – Comedian and actor Arthur Askey dies aged 82 in London only four months after his final performance.
- 28 November – Opinion polls show the Conservative government with an approval rating of up to 44% and well on course for a second successive electoral victory, 13 points ahead of Labour. Support for the Alliance has halved in the space of a year.

=== December ===
- 2 December – The Queen's Park by-election in Glasgow is held as a result of the death of sitting Labour MP Frank McElhone on 22 September. His widow, Helen McElhone, holds the seat for Labour.
- 3 December
  - UK release of the film Gandhi. This will win eight Academy Awards, including Best Picture, Best Director (Richard Attenborough) and Best Actor (Ben Kingsley) four months later.
  - UK release of the film animation The Plague Dogs based on the novel of the same name by Richard Adams; the film is controversial as it contains some violence.
- 6 December – Droppin Well bombing: The Irish National Liberation Army kills seventeen people in a bomb attack at the Droppin Well Inn, Ballykelly, County Londonderry.
- 10 December
  - British chemist Aaron Klug wins the Nobel Prize in Chemistry "for his development of crystallographic electron microscopy and his structural elucidation of biologically important nucleic acid-protein complexes".
  - John Robert Vane wins the Nobel Prize in Physiology or Medicine jointly with Sune Bergström and Bengt I. Samuelsson "for their discoveries concerning prostaglandins and related biologically active substances".
- 12 December – Greenham Common Women's Peace Camp: 30,000 women hold hands and form a human chain around the 9-mile (14.5 km) perimeter fence.
- 15 December – The British colony of Gibraltar gains a pedestrian link to Spain, as the gates which separated the two states are re-opened by the Spanish government after thirteen years.
- 23 December – More than 1,200 jobs are lost in the West Midlands when the Round Oak Steelworks at Brierley Hill closes after 125 years.

=== Undated ===
- Inflation has fallen to a 10-year low of 8.6%, although some 1,500,000 jobs have reportedly been lost largely due to Government policy in attaining this end.
- Vauxhall drops the Opel symbol from its cars.

== Publications ==
- Douglas Adams' comic novel Life, the Universe and Everything.
- William Boyd's novel An Ice-Cream War.
- Bruce Chatwin's novel On the Black Hill.
- Shirley Conran's novel Lace.
- Richard Dawkins' book The Extended Phenotype.
- Sue Townsend's comic novel The Secret Diary of Adrian Mole, Aged 13¾ (7 October, the character having been introduced earlier in the year in a BBC Radio 4 play).

== Births ==
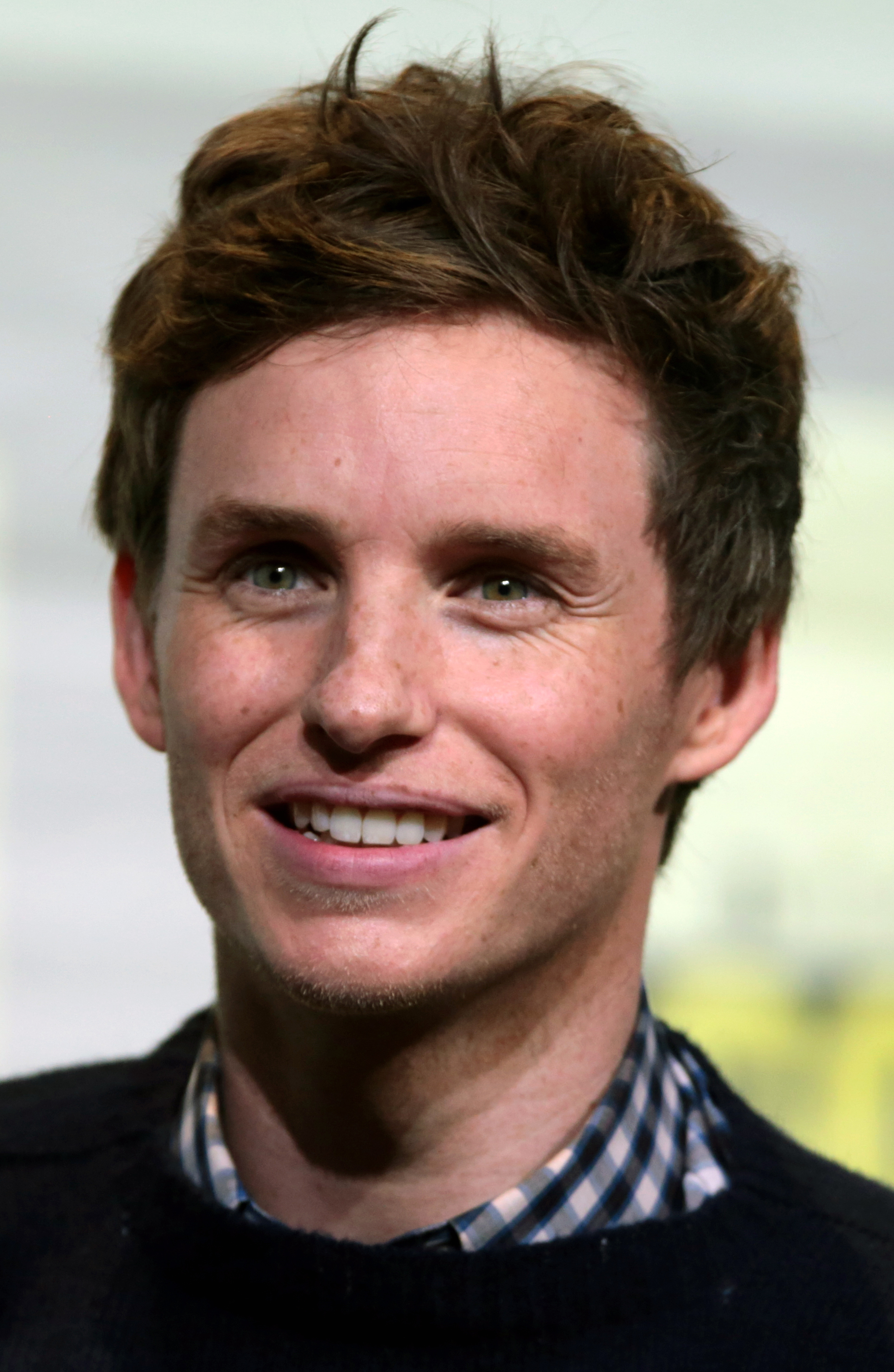
Eddie Redmayne

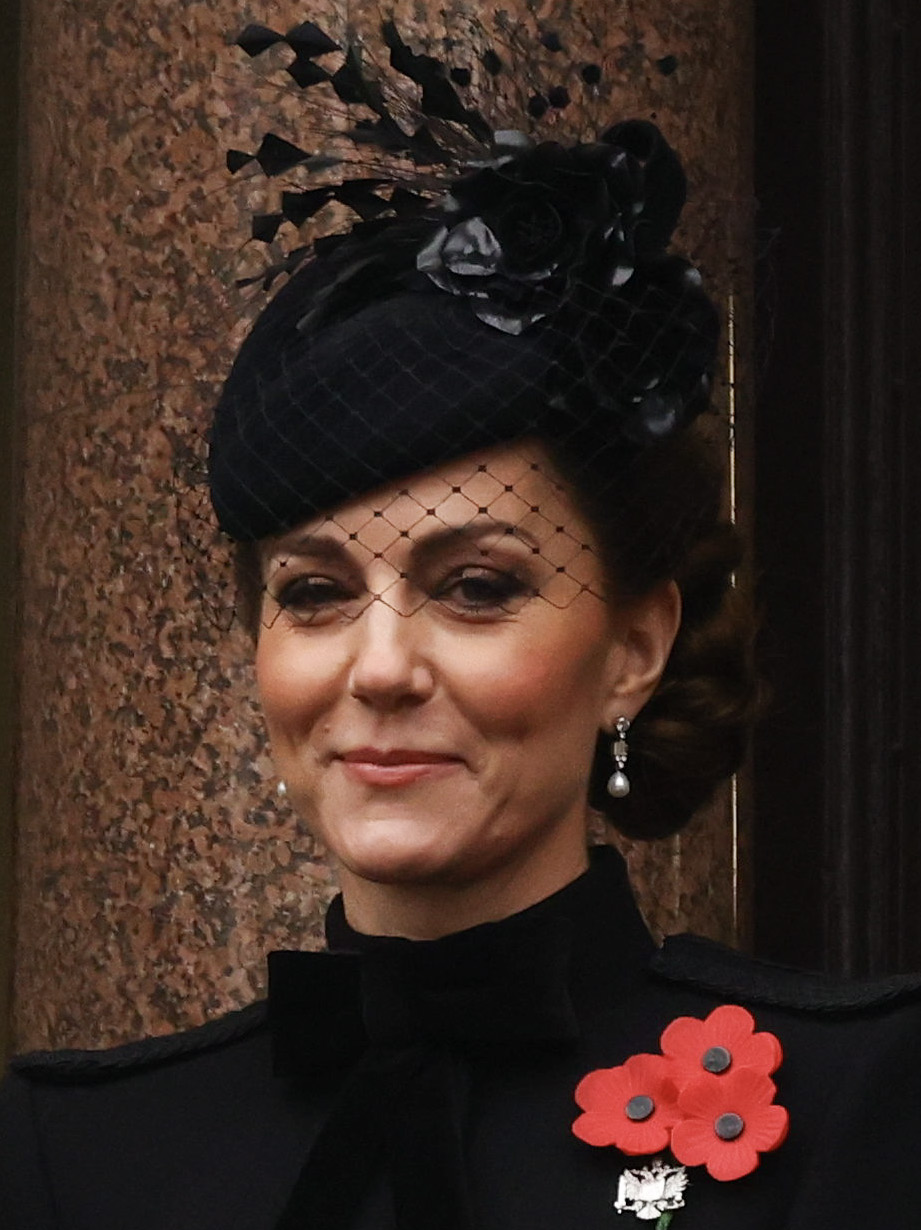
The Princess of Wales

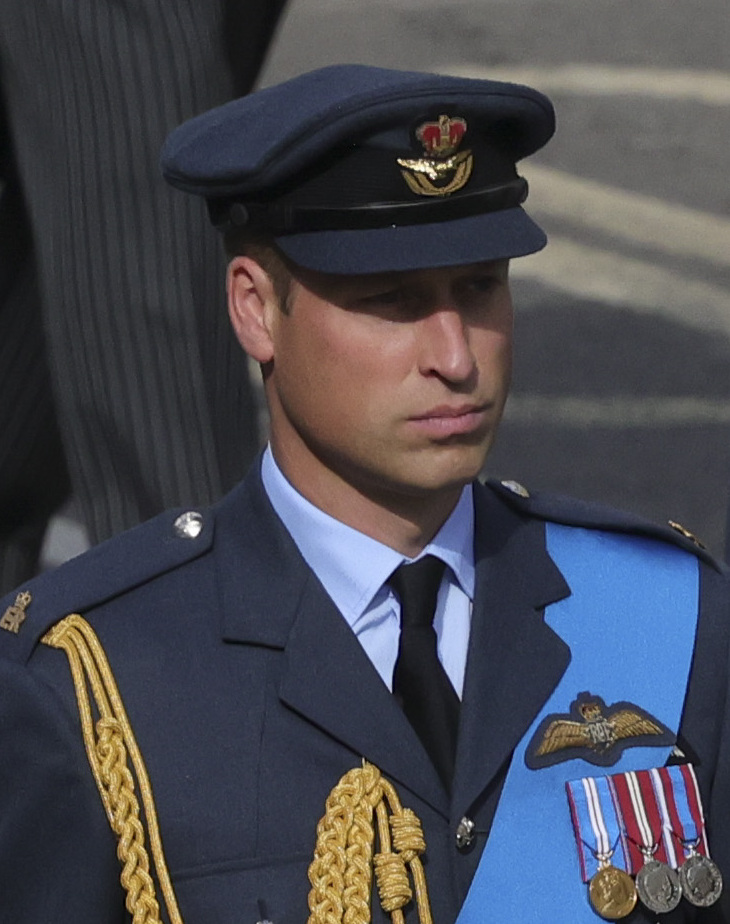
The Prince of Wales

- 1 January
  - Luke Rodgers, footballer
  - Gemma Hunt, television host
- 4 January – Richard Logan, footballer
- 6 January – Eddie Redmayne, actor
- 9 January
  - Catherine, Princess of Wales
  - Robert Jenrick, politician
- 13 January – Ruth Wilson, actress
- 16 January – Preston, singer
- 19 January – Shaun Wallis, ice hockey player
- 21 January – Nick Duncombe, rugby union player (died 2003)
- 31 January – Allan McGregor, footballer
- 11 February – Natalie Dormer, actress
- 25 February – Chris Baird, footballer
- 26 February – Lisa Mason, gymnast
- 9 March – Paul 'Des' Ballard, children's television presenter
- 5 April – Hayley Atwell, actress
- 7 April – Kelli Young, singer
- 24 April – Laura Hamilton, children's television presenter
- 26 April – Jon Lee, singer and actor
- 28 April – Nikki Grahame, reality TV star (died 2021)
- 1 May – Jamie Dornan, Northern Irish actor
- 3 May – Rebecca Hall, actress and filmmaker
- 4 May – John Robins, comedian and radio presenter
- 9 May - Mark Bedworth, rugby union footballer
- 10 May – Adebayo Akinfenwa, footballer
- 15 May – Douglas Simpson, Scottish field hockey forward
- 19 May – Kevin Amankwaah, footballer
- 7 June – Amy Nuttall, actress and singer
- 12 June – James Tomlinson, English cricketer
- 17 June
  - Arthur Darvill, British actor
  - Jodie Whittaker, British actor
- 20 June – Example, rapper and singer-songwriter
- 21 June – William, Prince of Wales
- 8 July – James Graham, playwright
- 9 July – Toby Kebbell, actor
- 13 July – Simon Clist, footballer
- 18 July – Andrew Alexander, actor
- 28 July – Michael Rose, footballer
- 30 July – James Anderson, cricketer
- 6 August - Karl Davies, actor
- 10 August – Shaun Murphy, snooker player
- 14 August – Benjamin Cohen journalist, founder of PinkNews.co.uk
- 7 September – David Dawson, actor
- 12 September – Layla Moran, Liberal Democrat politician
- 22 September – Billie Piper, singer and actress
- 23 September – Emma Grede, businesswoman
- 26 September – Rob Burrow, rugby league player and motor neurone disease campaigner (died 2024)
- 30 September – Michelle Marsh, model
- 4 October – YolanDa Brown, jazz saxophonist
- 7 October - Jermain Defoe, footballer
- 8 October – Glenn Kirkham, field hockey player
- 10 October – Dan Stevens, actor
- 21 October – David Mansouri, Scottish field hockey defender
- 26 October – Nicola Adams, boxer
- 28 October – Matt Smith, actor
- 4 November – Neil Mellor, footballer
- 9 November – Kieran Darlow, footballer
- 13 November – Adam Shantry, cricketer
- 14 November – Stephen Hughes, Scottish footballer
- 27 November – Tommy Robinson, political activist
- 30 November – Tony Bellew, boxer
- 5 December – Craig Farrell, English footballer (died 2022)
- 7 December – Jack Huston, actor
- 12 December – Louise Carroll, Scottish field hockey defender
- 14 December – Steve Sidwell, footballer
- 15 December – Charlie Cox, actor

== Deaths ==
=== January ===
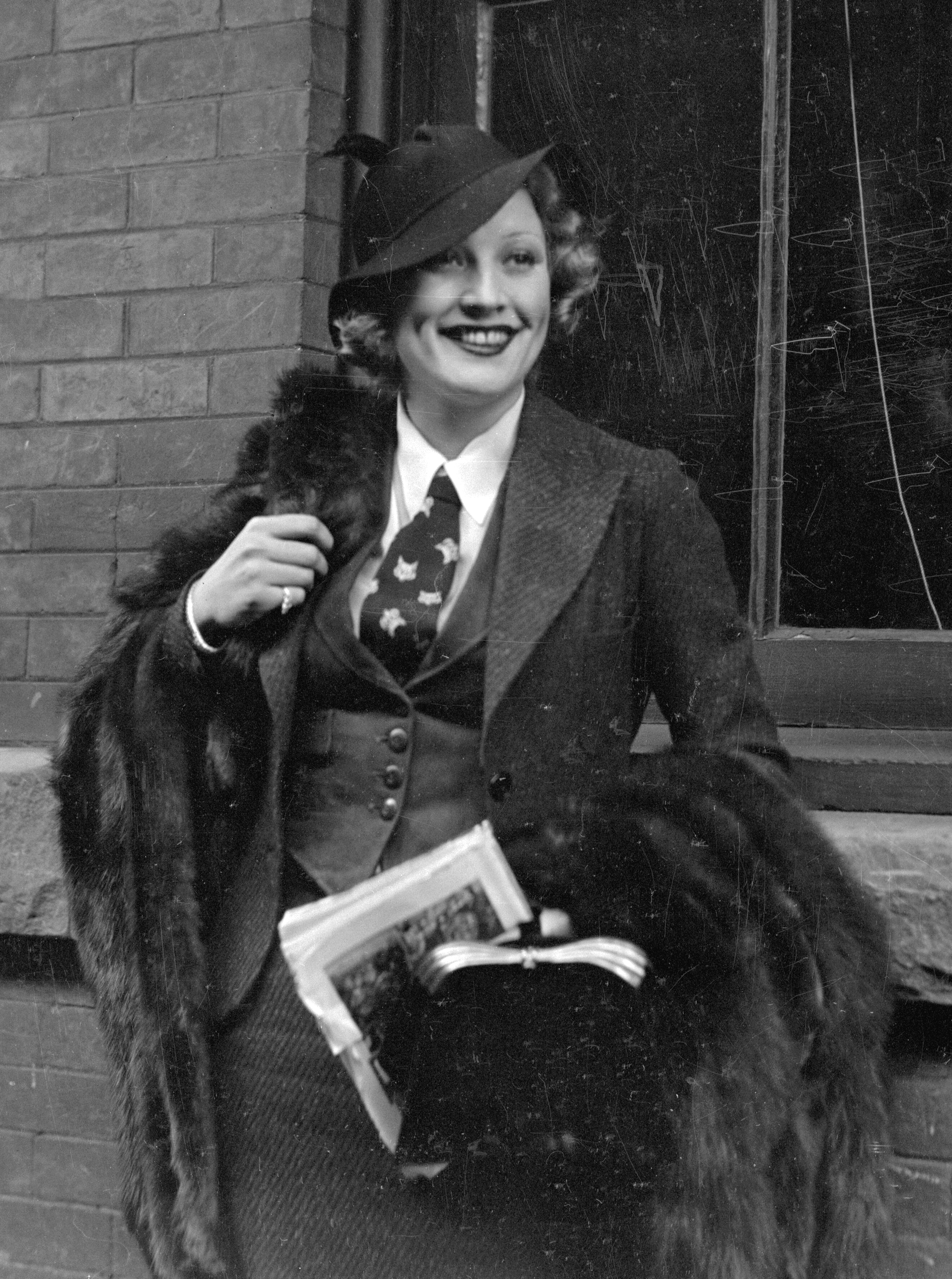
Margot Grahame

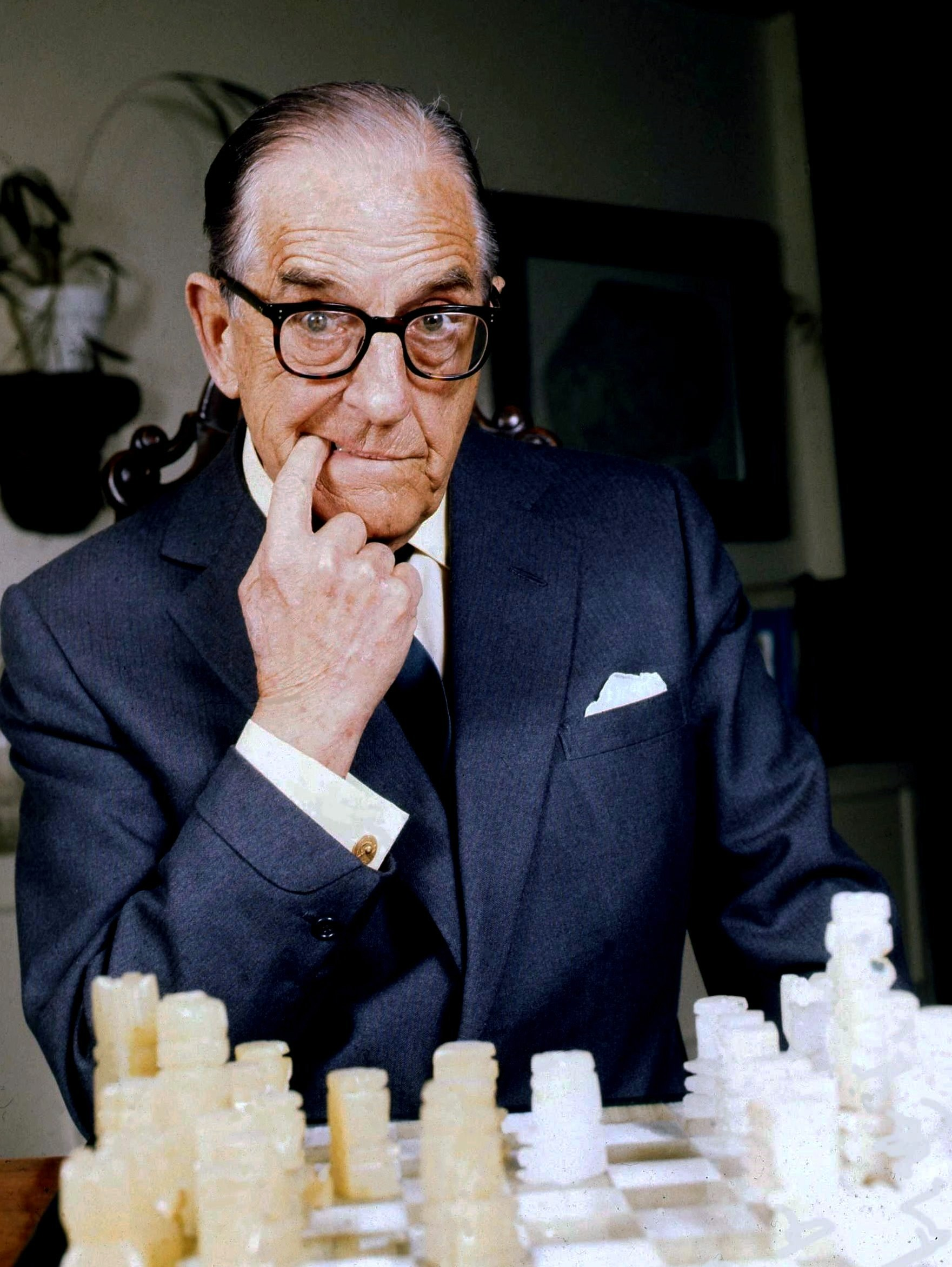
Stanley Holloway

- 1 January – Margot Grahame, actress (born 1911)
- 2 January – Sir Tam Galbraith, politician (born 1917)
- 3 January
  - Edward Russell, 26th Baron de Clifford, peer (born 1907)
  - Wilfred Wood, World War I soldier and Victoria Cross recipient (born 1897)
- 4 January
  - John Cordeaux, politician (born 1902)
  - Wykeham Cornwallis, 2nd Baron Cornwallis, peer and cricketer (born 1892)
- 6 January – Sir John Bradley, RAF air marshal (born 1888)
- 7 January – Lady Pamela Smith, socialite (born 1914)
- 10 January
  - Edward Colville, Army major-general (born 1905)
  - Raymond Toole Stott, bibliographer (born 1910)
- 11 January
  - Ronald Lewis, actor (born 1928; suicide)
  - Sir Kenneth Strong, Army major-general (born 1900)
  - Ivor Owen Thomas, politician and trade unionist (born 1898)
  - Leslie Arthur Wilcox, artist (born 1904)
- 12 January
  - Dorothy Howell, composer (born 1898)
  - Frank Crowther Roberts, Army major-general and Victoria Cross recipient (born 1891)
- 14 January
  - John Pennycuick, lawyer, judge and tennis player (born 1899)
  - George Wood, Army major-general (born 1898)
- 15 January
  - Sir Douglas Glover, Army colonel and politician (born 1908)
  - Arthur Verney Hammond, Army major-general (born 1892)
  - Robert Lynn, film and television director (born 1918)
- 16 January
  - George Pargiter, Baron Pargiter, politician (born 1897)
  - Sir Thomas Shirley, RAF vice-marshal (born 1908)
- 17 January – William Price, World War I air ace (born 1895)
- 18 January – Alec Robertson, music critic (born 1892)
- 19 January – Harry Hanan, cartoonist (born 1916)
- 21 January – Penelope Dudley-Ward, actress (born 1914)
- 24 January – Julian Snow, Baron Burntwood, politician (born 1910)
- 26 January – Ginger Lees, motorcycle racer (born 1905)
- 27 January – Frank John William Goldsmith, RMS Titanic survivor (born 1902)
- 29 January
  - Philip Sargant Florence, economist (born 1890, United States)
  - Sir Rudolph Peters, biochemist (born 1889)
- 30 January
  - Katherine Bacon, pianist (born 1896)
  - Stanley Holloway, actor, comedian, singer and poet (born 1890)
- 31 January
  - Ritchie Calder, journalist and academic (born 1906)
  - Cyril Edward Gourley, Army captain and Victoria Cross recipient (born 1893)

=== February ===
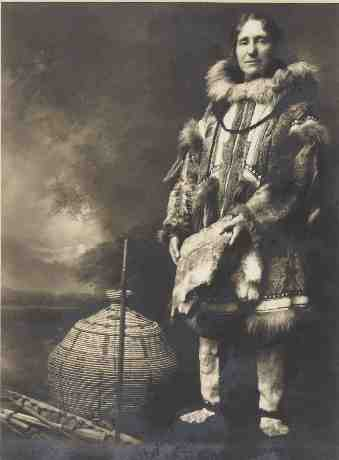
Isobel Wylie Hutchison

- 1 February – Sir John Foster, politician (born 1903)
- 4 February
  - Alex Harvey, Scottish-born blues/rock musician (born 1935)
  - Anne Gillespie Shaw, Scottish engineer and businesswoman (born 1904)
- 5 February
  - Ernest Bader, businessman and philanthropist (born 1890)
  - Peter Opie, folklorist (born 1918)
  - Ronald Welch, author (born 1909)
- 6 February
  - Ben Nicholson, painter (born 1894)
  - Frank Wilde, tennis player (born 1911)
- 7 February
  - Roy W. Chappell, RAF air commodore (born 1896)
  - Robert Lyell Mitchell, chemist (born 1910)
- 8 February
  - Henry Drummond Wolff, politician (born 1899)
  - Sir Cedric Morris, 9th Baronet, artist and art teacher (born 1889)
- 9 February – Phyllis Morris, actress and children's writer (born 1894)
- 11 February – Alfred Spinks, chemist and biologist (born 1917)
- 12 February
  - Geoffrey Bullough, literary scholar (born 1901)
  - Sir Philip Livingston, RAF air marshal (born 1893)
- 16 February – Sir Christopher Masterman, civil servant (born 1889)
- 17 February
  - Sir Peter Cazalet, Royal Navy vice-admiral (born 1899)
  - Iris Wedgwood, writer (born 1887)
- 18 February – J. M. Robson, geneticist and physicist (born 1900, Belgium)
- 19 February – Dame Margery Perham, Africanist (born 1895)
- 20 February
  - Alfhild Hovdan, Norwegian journalist who introduced the Trafalgar Square Christmas tree in 1947 (born 1904, Sweden-Norway)
  - Isobel Wylie Hutchison, Arctic traveller and botanist (born 1889)
  - Derek Jackson, physicist (born 1906)
- 21 February – W. E. Shewell-Cooper, gardener and gardening writer (born 1900)
- 22 February
  - Annie Barnes, suffragist (born 1886)
  - Wilfrid Westall, Anglican prelate (born 1900)
- 23 February – Elisabeth Kyle, journalist and author (born 1901)
- 24 February – Keith Henderson, artist (born 1883)
- 25 February – Sir Martin Flett, civil servant (born 1911)
- 26 February – Sir Robert Heatlie Scott, civil servant (born 1905)
- 27 February – Henry Gage, 6th Viscount Gage, peer (born 1895)

=== March ===
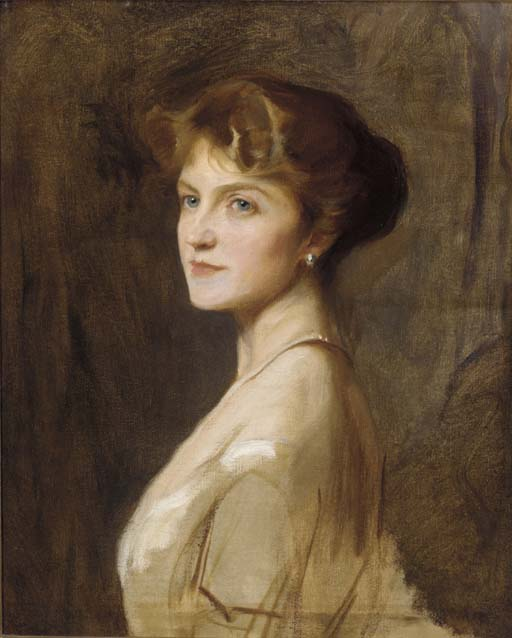
Ivy Cavendish-Bentinck, Duchess of Portland

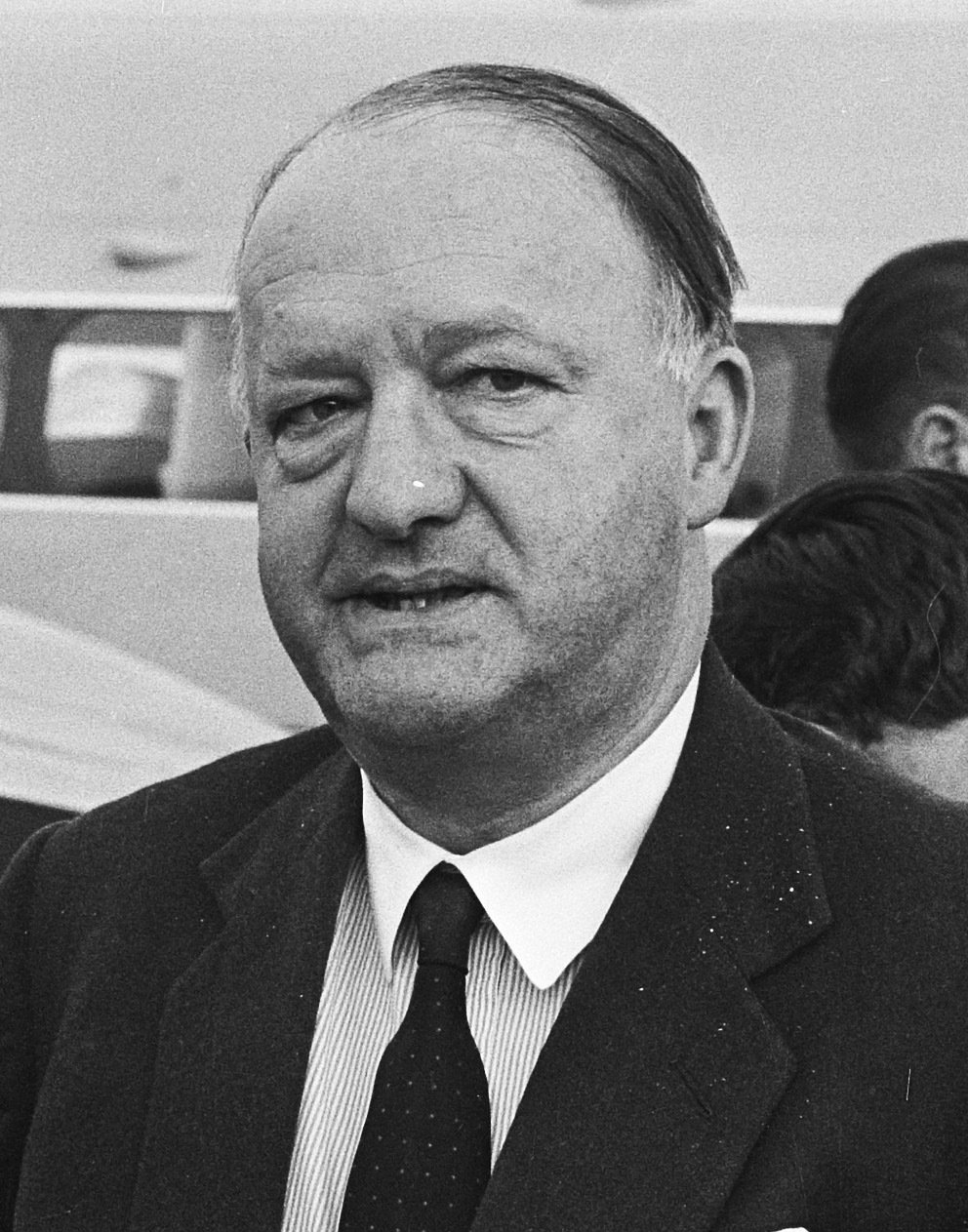
Rab Butler

- 2 March – Sir Donald Hardman, air chief marshal (born 1899)
- 3 March – Ivy Cavendish-Bentinck, Duchess of Portland, aristocrat (born 1887)
- 7 March – John Hare, 1st Viscount Blakenham, politician (born 1911)
- 8 March – Rab Butler, politician (born 1902)
- 9 March – William Johnson, police officer (born 1899)
- 10 March – Harry Carter, typographer (born 1901)
- 11 March – Edmund Cooper, author and poet (born 1926)
- 13 March – William Fairhurst, bridge designer and chess player (born 1903)
- 14 March – Alfred Fairbank, calligrapher and author on handwriting (born 1895)
- 15 March – Edgell Rickword, poet and critic (born 1898)
- 16 March
  - Walter Rangeley, Olympic athlete (born 1903)
  - Sir Geoffrey Vickers, lawyer, administrator, writer and scientist (born 1894)
- 18 March – Barbara Tennant, actress (born 1892)
- 20 March – Roy Fox, bandleader and conductor (born 1901, United States)
- 21 March
  - Harry H. Corbett, actor (born 1925)
  - Helena Rosa Wright, family planning pioneer (born 1887)
- 22 March
  - Bob Foster, motorcycle racer (born 1911)
  - Harold Goldblatt, Northern Irish actor and theatre director (born 1899)
  - W. H. Marwick, economic historian (born 1894)
- 25 March – Thomas Lionel Hodgkin, Marxist historian (born 1910)
- 26 March
  - John Gretton, 2nd Baron Gretton, peer and politician (born 1902)
  - F. E. Halliday, academic, author and painter (born 1903)
  - Sam Kydd, actor (born 1915)
- 27 March – Ted Lewis, crime fiction writer (born 1940)
- 29 March – Frederick George Mann, organic chemist (born 1897)
- 31 March
  - Thomas Cadett, journalist (born 1898)
  - Dave Clement, footballer (born 1948)

=== April ===
- 2 April – Arnold Benington, ornithologist (born 1903)
- 4 April – E. J. H. Nash, Anglican clergyman (born 1898)
- 5 April – Alexander Spearman, politician (born 1901)
- 9 April – Tom Dresser, World War I soldier and Victoria Cross recipient (born 1891)
- 10 April – Richard Walker, aerospace engineer (born 1900)
- 11 April – Barbara Strang, linguist (born 1925)
- 12 April
  - Norman Denny, writer and translator (born 1901)
  - Tony Greenwood, Baron Greenwood of Rossendale, politician (born 1911)
- 13 April – John Drummond, 15th Baron Strange, peer (born 1900)
- 15 April
  - Arthur Lowe, actor (born 1915)
  - Terry Parry, firefighter and trade unionist (born 1921)
- 17 April – Bridget Monckton, 11th Lady Ruthven of Freeland, peeress (born 1896)
- 24 April – Hilda Stewart Reid, novelist and historian (born 1898)
- 25 April – Celia Johnson, actress (born 1908)
- 28 April
  - Nobby Clark, English cricketer (born 1902)
  - Hiram Wild, botanist (born 1917)
- 30 April – Vernon Willey, 2nd Baron Barnby, peer and politician (born 1884)

=== May ===
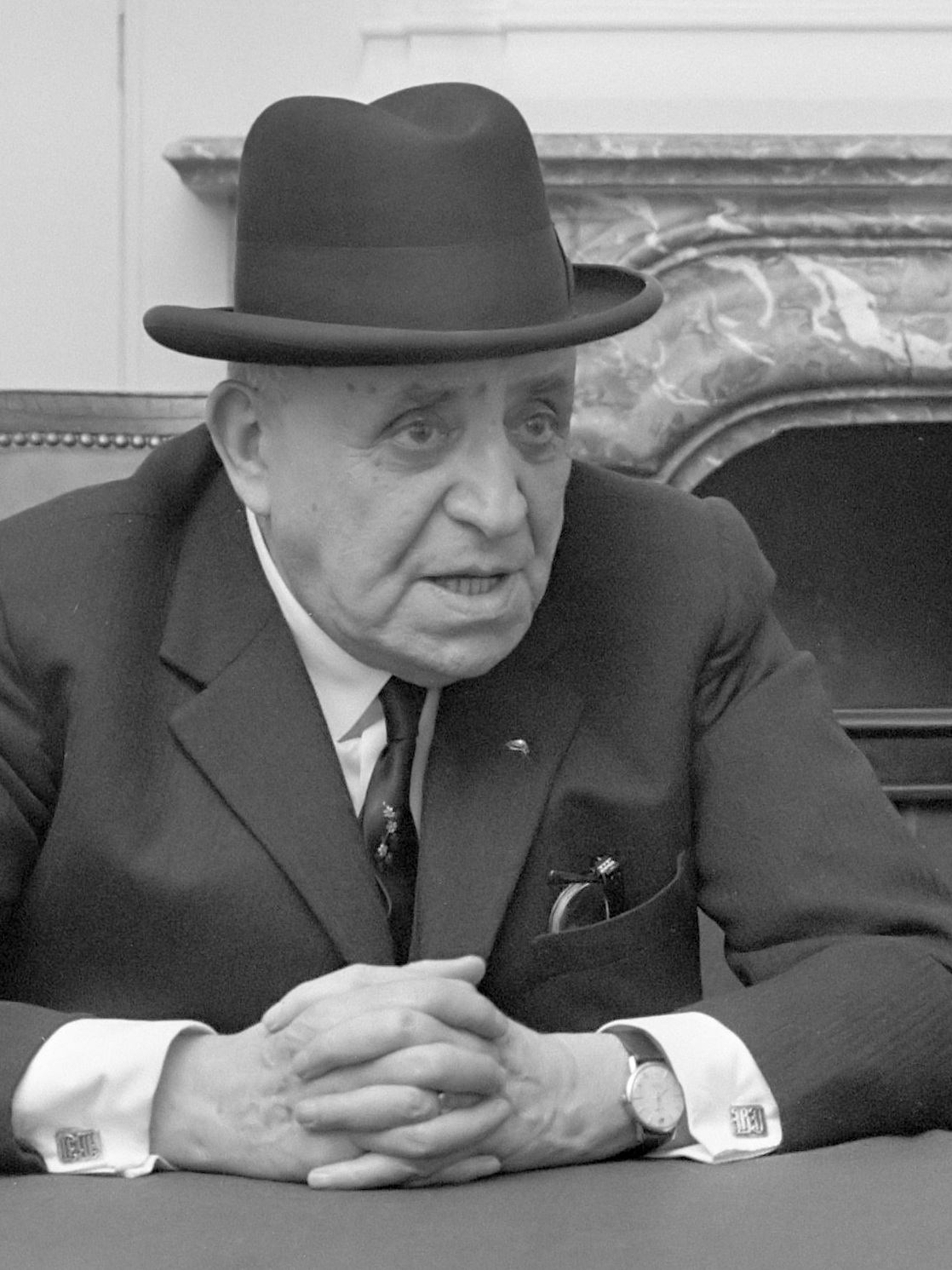
Barnett Janner

- 1 May – William Primrose, violist (born 1903)
- 2 May
  - Frederick William Anderson, geologist (born 1905)
  - James Fitton, artist (born 1899)
- 4 May – Barnett Janner, Baron Janner, politician (born 1892)
- 5 May
  - Sir Ian George Wilson Hill, physician (born 1904)
  - Bob Shankly, Scottish footballer and manager (born 1910)
- 6 May
  - Jennie Eirian Davies, Welsh politician and magazine editor (born 1925)
  - Rosamond Harding, music scholar and writer (born 1898)
- 10 May
  - Frank Lake, psychiatrist (born 1914)
  - Ivy Pinchbeck, historian (born 1898)
- 11 May – Sir David Follett, curator, director of the Science Museum (1960–1973) (born 1907)
- 12 May
  - James Dempsey, politician (born 1917)
  - Edward Ramsden Hall, racing driver (born 1900)
  - Sir Ronald Bodley Scott, haematologist (born 1906)
  - Humphrey Searle, composer (born 1915)
- 13 May – Billy Steel, Scottish footballer (born 1923)
- 14 May – Robert James, teacher (born 1905)
- 15 May – John Newbold, motorcycle racer (killed while racing) (born 1952)
- 17 May
  - Peter Boardman, mountaineer (died on Everest) (born 1950)
  - Joe Tasker, mountaineer (died on Everest) (born 1948)
- 18 May – Ralph Reader, actor and songwriter (born 1903)
- 19 May
  - Elwyn Jones, television writer and producer (born 1923)
  - Frank Winnold Prentice, RMS Titanic crew member and survivor (born 1889)
  - Corbet Woodall, television newsreader (born 1929)
- 21 May
  - Jean Coleman, World War II spy (born 1908, France)
  - Sir Arthur Norrington, publisher, creator of the Norrington Table (born 1899)
- 23 May – Sir Thomas Dalling, veterinarian (born 1892)
- 24 May
  - Richard Hall, composer (born 1903)
  - Sidney H. Haughton, British-born South African palaeontologist and geologist (born 1888)
  - Meyer Oppenheim, Scottish financier (born 1905)
- 26 May
  - Robert Armitage, Royal Navy commander and George Cross recipient (born 1905)
  - Richard Battle, plastic surgeon (born 1907)
  - Bessie Williamson, distillery manager (born 1910)
- 28 May – Lieutenant-Colonel H. Jones, Falklands War casualty and posthumous recipient of Victoria Cross (born 1940)
- 30 May
  - Sir Harry Barnes, artist (born 1915)
  - Doris Leslie, novelist (born 1891)
- 31 May – Eryl Davies, Welsh teacher (born 1922)

=== June ===
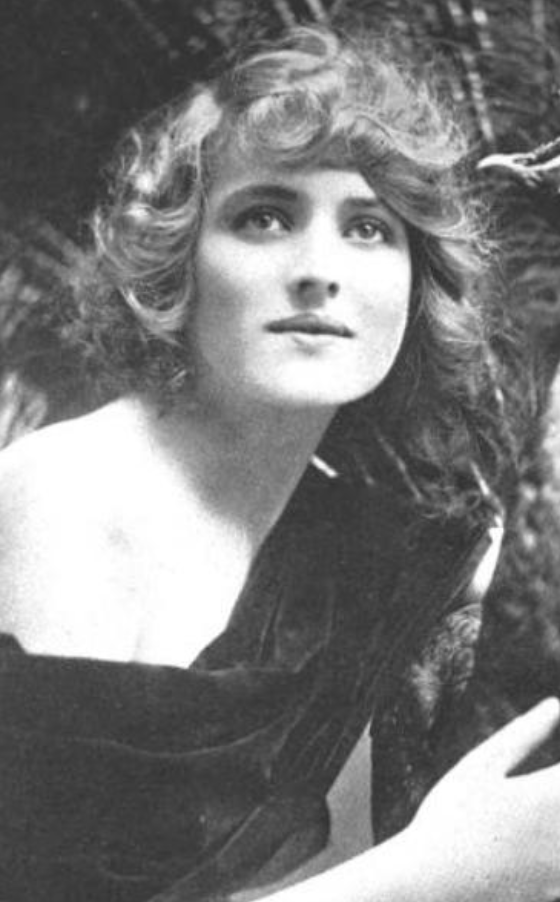
Joan Clarkson

- 2 June
  - Reginald Leonard Haine, Army lieutenant-colonel and Victoria Cross recipient (born 1896)
  - George E. A. Hallett, aviator (born 1890)
  - Willie Smith, billiards player (born 1886)
- 3 June – Ronald Duncan, writer and poet (born 1914, Rhodesia)
- 6 June – Ifor Davies, politician (born 1910)
- 8 June – Alan Coddington, academic (born 1941)
- 9 June – Richard St. Barbe Baker, botanist, activist and writer (born 1889)
- 10 June
  - Margaret Bastock, zoologist (born 1920)
  - Captain Gavin Hamilton, Falklands War casualty (born 1953)
- 12 June
  - Ian McKay, Falklands War casualty and posthumous recipient of Victoria Cross (born 1953)
  - Dame Marie Rambert, Polish-born British ballet dancer and teacher (born 1888)
- 16 June
  - James Honeyman-Scott, lead guitarist of the Pretenders (born 1956)
  - Margaret Thomson, physician and prisoner of war (born 1902)
- 17 June – Walter James, 4th Baron Northbourne, peer and Olympic rower (born 1896)
- 18 June – Denise Lester, teacher (born 1909)
- 19 June
  - Joan Clarkson, actress (born 1904)
  - Dennis Herbert, 2nd Baron Hemingford, peer (born 1904)
  - Albert Samuels, politician (born 1900)
- 20 June – Ishbel Peterkin, daughter of Prime Minister Ramsay MacDonald (born 1903)
- 21 June
  - Chrystabel Procter, gardener and horticulturalist (born 1894)
  - Anne Wignall, socialite and author (born 1912)
- 22 June – Alan Webb, actor (born 1906)
- 25 June – Alex Welsh, jazz musician (born 1929)
- 26 June
  - Geoffrey Bourne, Baron Bourne, Army general (born 1902)
  - Kingsley Kennerley, snooker player (born 1913)
  - Sandy Powell, comedian (born 1900)
- 29 June
  - Michael Brennan, actor (born 1912)
  - Donald MacLeod, bagpiper and composer of bagpipe music (born 1916)
- 30 June – Malcolm Saville, children's author (born 1901)

=== July ===
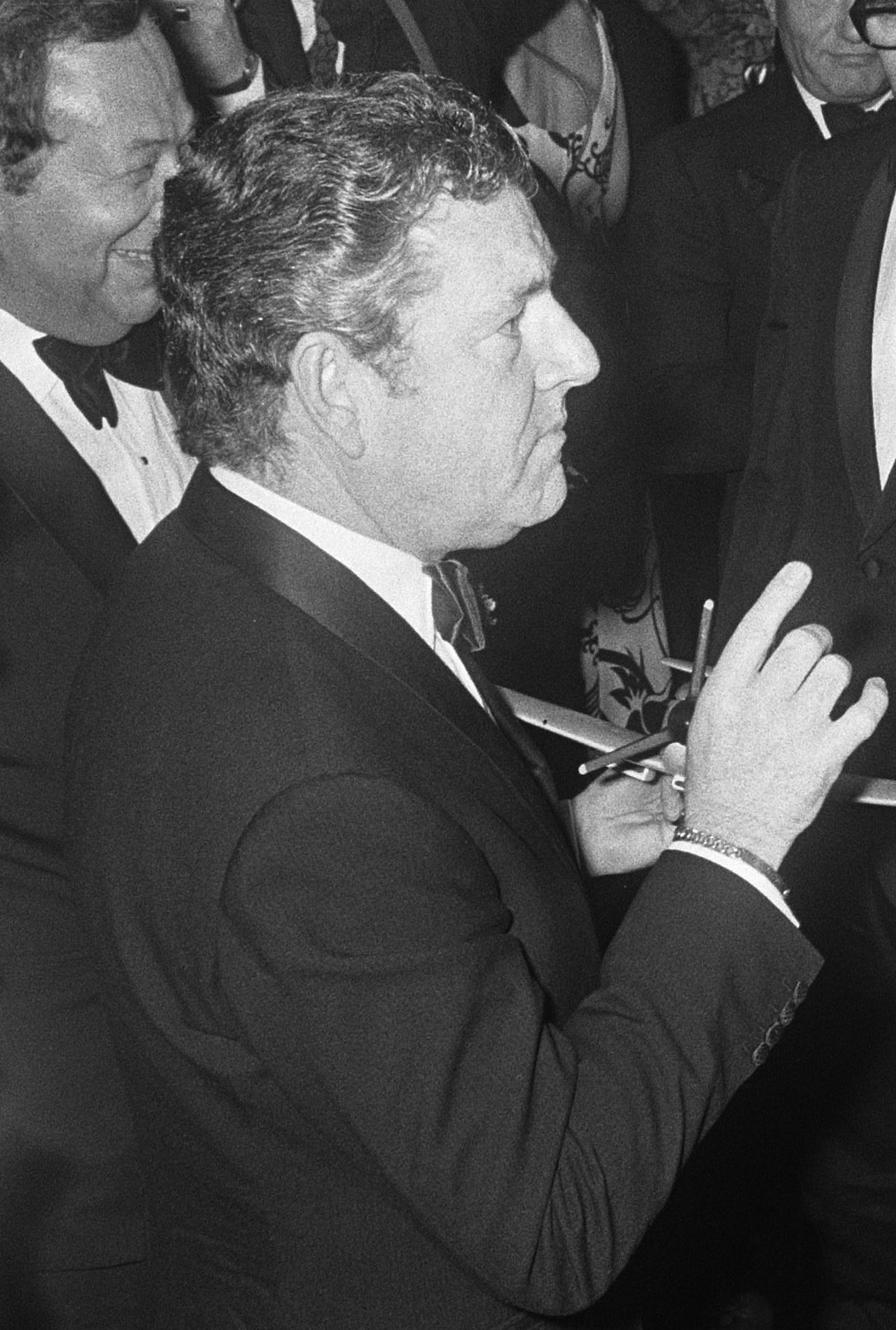
Kenneth More

- 1 July
  - Alexander Reid, playwright (born 1914)
  - Sir Raphael Tuck, lawyer and politician (born 1910)
- 4 July
  - Terry Higgins, early British casualty of AIDS (born 1945)
  - Barry Prudom, criminal (born 1944; suicide)
- 5 July – Geoffrey Keynes, surgeon and author (born 1887)
- 6 July
  - Sir Christopher Cox, educationist (born 1899)
  - Alma Reville, screenwriter and wife of Sir Alfred Hitchcock (born 1899)
- 7 July – Edgar Lobel, classicist and papyrologist (born 1888, Romania)
- 8 July – Edward Wolfe, artist (born 1897)
- 10 July
  - Gwilym Jenkins, statistician and systems engineer (born 1932)
  - G. E. L. Owen, classicist and philosopher (born 1922)
- 11 July – Susan Littler, actress (born 1948)
- 12 July – Kenneth More, actor (born 1914)
- 13 July
  - Nesta Maude Ashworth, Scouting pioneer (born 1893)
  - David Brown, Bishop of Guildford (died in office) (born 1920)
  - Evan Thomas, actor (born 1891, Canada)
- 14 July – John Cecil-Wright, RAF officer and politician (born 1886)
- 15 July
  - James Crawford, trade unionist (born 1896)
  - Enid Lorimer, actress, director and producer (born 1887)
- 19 July
  - John Harvey, actor (born 1911)
  - Lord Rupert Nevill, chairman of the British Olympic Association (born 1923)
- 21 July – John Bertram Phillips, Anglican clergyman and Bible translator (born 1906)
- 22 July
  - Sir Robert Birley, teacher and anti-apartheid activist (born 1903)
  - Edward Albert Gibbs, Royal Navy captain (born 1903)
  - George Lingham, World War I air ace (born 1898)
- 27 July
  - Joseph Oscar Irwin, statistician (born 1898)
  - Hilda James, Olympic swimmer (born 1904)
  - Jack Powell, Olympic runner (born 1910)
- 29 July
  - Laurence Boutwood, Royal Navy rear-admiral (born 1898)
  - Maysie Chalmers, engineer and aviator (born 1894)
  - Sir Richard Gale, Army general (born 1896)
- 30 July – Jocelyn Cadbury, politician (born 1946; suicide)
- 31 July – George Cyril Allen, economist (born 1900)

=== August ===
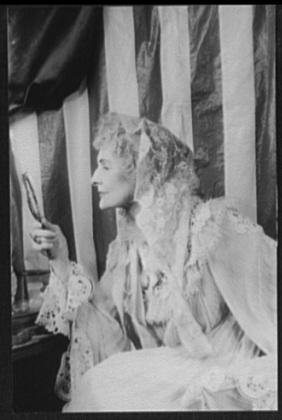
Cathleen Nesbitt

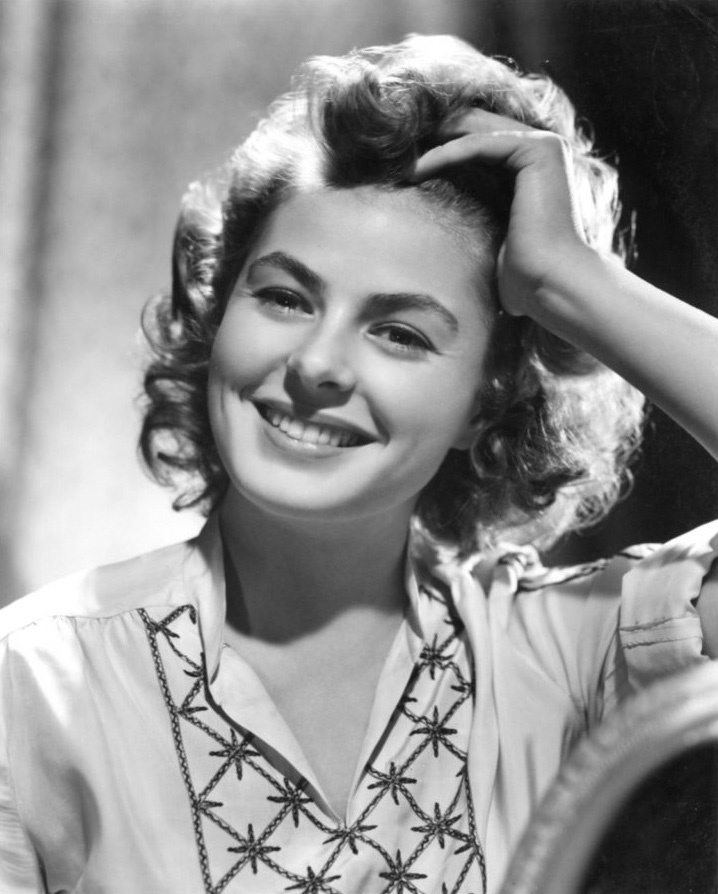
Ingrid Bergman

- 2 August
  - Cathleen Nesbitt, actress (born 1888)
  - Sir Raymond Phillips, judge (born 1915)
- 3 August – David Carritt, art historian (born 1927)
- 5 August
  - Sir John Charnley, orthopaedic surgeon (born 1911)
  - Allan Gwynne-Jones, painter (born 1892)
- 6 August – Vivian Pitchforth, war artist (born 1895)
- 7 August – Frederick Cundiff, businessman and politician (born 1895)
- 8 August
  - Eric Brandon, motor racing driver (born 1920)
  - Tom Chatto, actor (born 1920)
  - Dorothy Edwards, children's author (born 1914)
  - Sir Arthur Gosling, civil servant and forester (born 1901)
- 9 August – Geoffrey Marshall, physician (born 1887)
- 10 August
  - Sir Geoffrey de Freitas, politician and diplomat (born 1913, St Lucia)
  - John Howard, politician (born 1913)
  - John Tiltman, Army brigadier (born 1894)
- 11 August – Catherine Gardiner, actress and artist (born 1900)
- 14 August
  - Patrick Magee, Northern Irish actor (born 1922)
  - Dorothy Whitelock, historian (born 1901)
- 15 August
  - Jacqueline Nearne, World War II spy (born 1916)
  - Jock Taylor, motorcycle racer (killed while racing) (born 1954)
- 19 August – Russell Waters, film actor (born 1908)
- 21 August
  - Harry Lamborn, politician (born 1915)
  - Jack Rutherford, actor (born 1893)
- 22 August – John Boxer, actor (born 1909)
- 24 August – Sir Lawrence Robson, accountant (born 1904)
- 25 August – Ernest Fahmy, obstetrician and gynaecologist (born 1892)
- 28 August
  - Ifor Evans, Baron Evans of Hungershall, academic (born 1899)
  - Nan Marriott-Watson, actress (born 1899)
- 29 August – Ingrid Bergman, film actress (born 1915, Sweden)
- 30 August – David Eirwyn Morgan, Welsh journalist and politician (born 1918)
- 31 August – Hugh Trevor Lambrick, archaeologist and historian (born 1904)

=== September ===
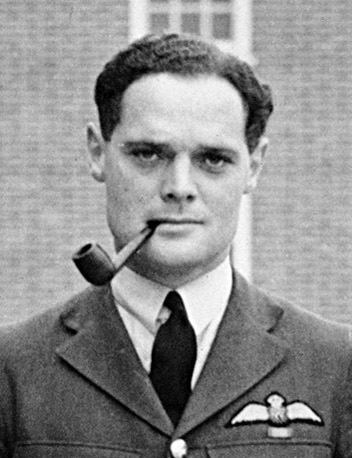
Douglas Bader

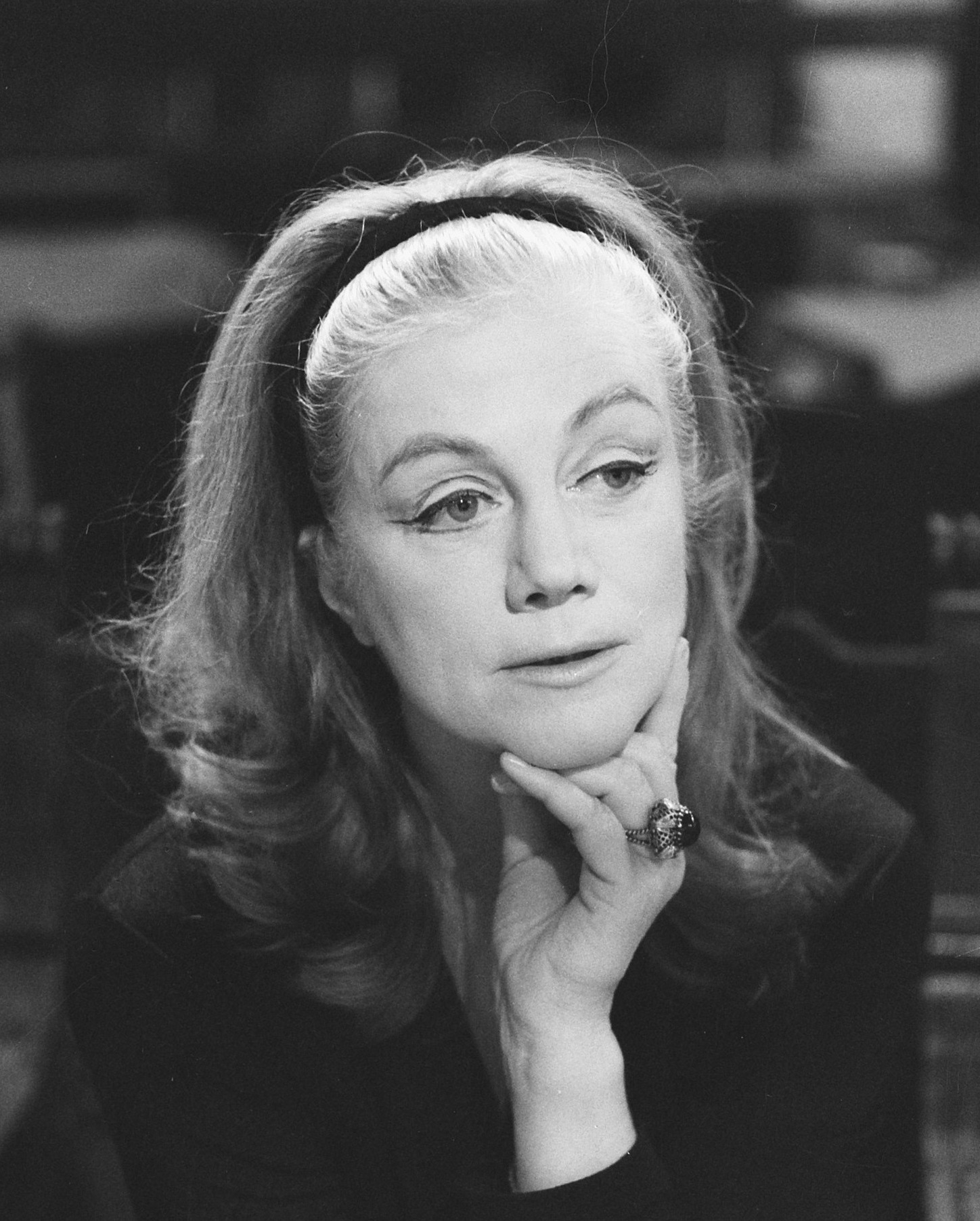
Sarah Churchill

- 1 September
  - Sir Clifford Curzon, pianist (born 1907)
  - Lady Iris Mountbatten, actress and model (born 1920)
- 2 September
  - George Bolton, banker (born 1900)
  - Sir George Chetwynd, politician and public servant (born 1916)
- 3 September – Sir Claud Seton, barrister and judge (born 1888)
- 4 September – Frank Jefferson, World War II soldier and Victoria Cross recipient (born 1921)
- 5 September
  - Douglas Bader, World War II fighter pilot (born 1910)
  - Lawrence Stenhouse, educational therapist (born 1926)
- 6 September – Norman Collins, radio and television executive (born 1906)
- 7 September – Sir Gerald Fitzmaurice, judge (born 1901)
- 9 September – Peter Hunter Blair, historian (born 1912)
- 10 September
  - Winifred Griffiths, politician (born 1895)
  - Jane Ingham, botanist and scientific translator (born 1897)
- 20 September – Bob Willis, trade unionist (born 1904)
- 21 September
  - Constantine Walter Benson, ornithologist (born 1909)
  - John O'Brien, politician (born 1922)
- 22 September – Frank McElhone, politician (born 1929)
- 23 September
  - Jeannie Saffin, victim of spontaneous human combustion (born 1921)
  - Lena Wood, violist (born 1899)
- 24 September – Sarah Churchill, actress (born 1914)
- 27 September – Lady Mary Lygon, aristocrat (born 1910)
- 28 September – Stella Jane Reekie, inter-faith worker (born 1922)
- 29 September
  - Letitia Chitty, aeronautical engineer (born 1897)
  - Lucy Griffiths, actress (born 1919)
  - A. L. Lloyd, folk song collector (born 1908)
- 30 September – Sir Edmund Bacon, 13th Baronet, businessman (born 1903)

=== October ===
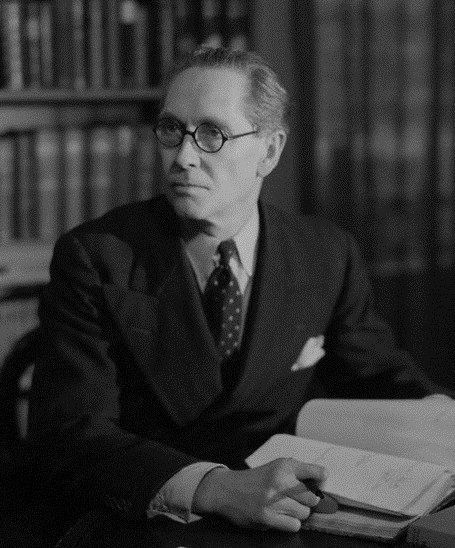
Philip Noel-Baker

- 1 October – Sir Ian Bowater, Army lieutenant-colonel and Lord Mayor of London (1969–1970) (born 1904)
- 2 October
  - Erskine Nicolson, 3rd Baron Carnock, peer (born 1884)
  - Robert Westwater, mining engineer and explosives expert (born 1908)
- 3 October – Vivien Merchant, actress (born 1929)
- 4 October – Macdonald Hastings, journalist (born 1909)
- 5 October – Sir William Gordon Bennett, politician (born 1889)
- 6 October
  - Margaret Davies, conservationist and archaeologist (born 1914)
  - Alastair Hugh Graham, honorary attaché (born 1904)
  - Philip Green, composer (born 1911)
- 8 October
  - Philip Noel-Baker, politician and Nobel Peace Prize winner (born 1889)
  - Erik Routley, musician and hymn writer (born 1917)
- 9 October
  - Charles E. Brown, photographer (born 1896)
  - Sir Reginald Champion, colonial administrator (born 1895)
- 11 October – Andrew Cudworth, Army major and medical researcher (born 1939)
- 14 October
  - Alice Walker, scholar (born 1900)
  - Peter Gordon Williams, businessman (born 1920)
- 15 October – Elsie Randolph, actress (born 1904)
- 16 October
  - Rory McEwen, artist (born 1932)
  - Alister Watson, mathematician and spy (born 1908)
- 17 October – Harry Slack, zoologist (born 1907)
- 18 October
  - A. R. B. Haldane, social historian (born 1900)
  - Idwal Jones, politician (born 1900)
  - Leslie Jones, lawyer and orchestral conductor (born 1905)
  - Kenneth Mackessack, Scottish cricketer (born 1902)
- 19 October – Iorwerth Peate, Welsh poet and scholar (born 1901)
- 20 October
  - Jimmy McGrory, Scottish footballer (born 1904)
  - Cedric Wallis, Army brigadier-general (born 1896)
- 22 October – Frederic Laurence, World War I air ace (born 1896)
- 23 October – Lionel Finch, Army major-general (born 1888)
- 24 October – Jim Hookway, greyhound trainer (born 1917)
- 25 October
  - Sir Godwin Michelmore, Army major-general (born 1894)
  - G. B. Newe, Northern Irish politician (born 1907)
  - Sir Charles Normand, meteorologist (born 1889)
- 26 October – Sybil Leek, witch and psychic (born 1917)
- 28 October
  - Robert d'Escourt Atkinson, astronomer and physicist (born 1898)
  - Phyllis Covell, tennis player (born 1895)
- 29 October
  - Sir Sidney Kirkman, Army general (born 1895)
  - William Lloyd Webber, composer and father of Andrew Lloyd Webber (born 1914)

=== November ===
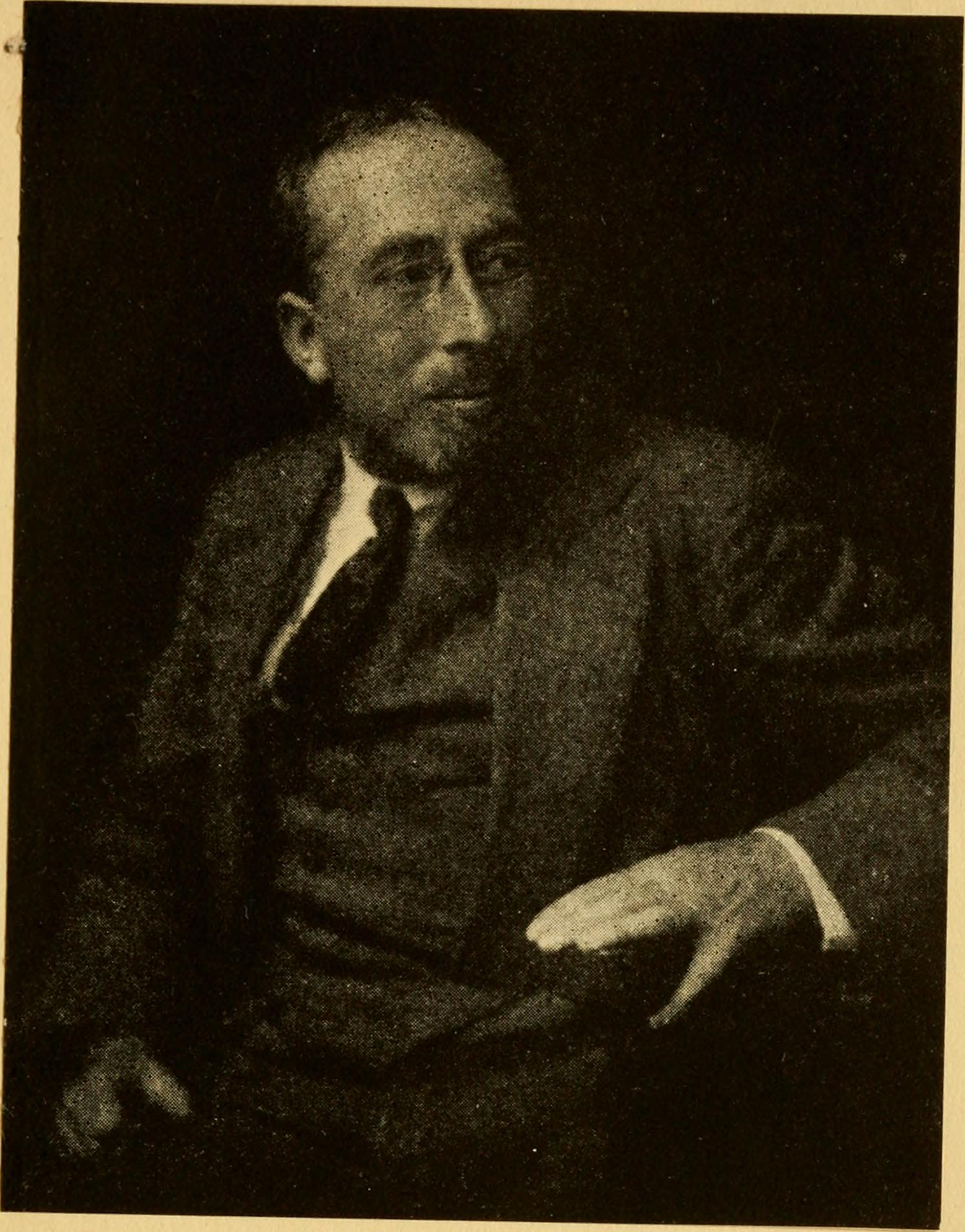
Frank Swinnerton

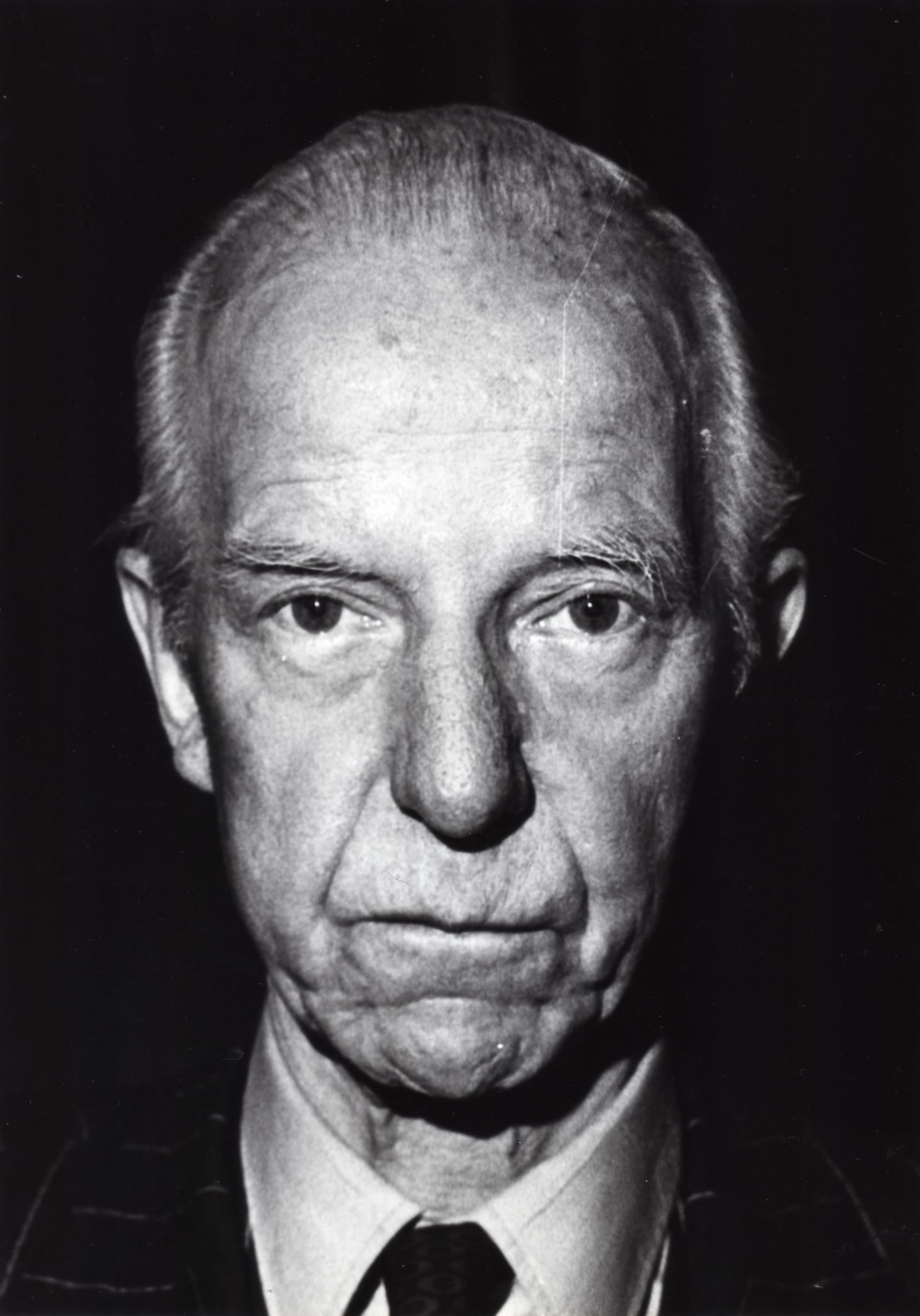
John Redcliffe-Maud, Baron Redcliffe-Maud

- 1 November
  - Dorothy Gow, composer (born 1892)
  - Leighton Lucas, composer (born 1903)
- 2 November
  - Sir Felix Brunner, 3rd Baronet, politician (born 1897)
  - Sir John William Sutton Pringle, zoologist (born 1912)
- 3 November
  - E. H. Carr, historian and journalist (born 1892)
  - Alan Parks, surgeon and president of the Royal College of Surgeons (born 1920)
- 4 November
  - Stephen Roskill, Royal Navy captain and author (born 1903)
  - Joseph Sieff, businessman (born 1905)
- 6 November
  - Frank Baker, novelist (born 1908)
  - Sir Thomas Elmhirst, air marshal and Lieutenant Governor of Guernsey (born 1895)
  - Frank Swinnerton, novelist, critic and biographer (born 1884)
  - Sir Neville Pearson, 2nd Baronet, newspaper publisher (born 1898)
- 7 November – Murdo Macfarlane, Scottish Gaelic poet and songwriter (born 1901)
- 8 November
  - Geoffrey Allen, Anglican prelate (born 1902)
  - Jimmy Dickinson, footballer (born 1925)
  - Sydney Harland, botanist (born 1891)
  - David Wyn Roberts, architect (born 1911)
  - Henry Thackthwaite, Army major (born 1904)
  - William Wynne-Jones, Baron Wynne-Jones, chemist (born 1903)
- 12 November – Dorothy Round, tennis player (born 1909)
- 13 November – Chesney Allen, entertainer and singer (born 1894)
- 16 November
  - Arthur Askey, comedian (born 1900)
  - Peter Forster, actor (born 1920)
  - Peter Yates, architect (born 1920)
- 17 November
  - Robert Bridgeman, 2nd Viscount Bridgeman, peer and Army officer (born 1896)
  - Sir Allan Noble, Royal Navy commander (born 1908)
- 19 November – Leslie John Witts, physician (born 1898)
- 20 November – John Redcliffe-Maud, Baron Redcliffe-Maud, civil servant and diplomat (born 1906)
- 21 November
  - Harold Hailstone, war artist (born 1897)
  - John Hargrave, writer and spiritual healer (born 1894)
- 24 November – Jean Nunn, civil servant (born 1916)
- 26 November – Robert Coote, actor (born 1909)
- 27 November – Harald Leslie, Lord Birsay, Scottish judge (born 1905)
- 28 November
  - Sir Norman Frederick Frome, ornithologist (born 1899)
  - Hugh O'Neill, 1st Baron Rathcavan, Northern Irish politician (born 1883)
- 30 November – Eric Thompson, actor and scriptwriter (born 1929)

=== December ===
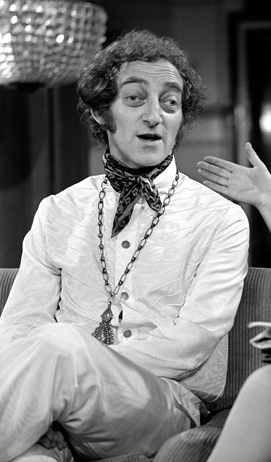
Marty Feldman

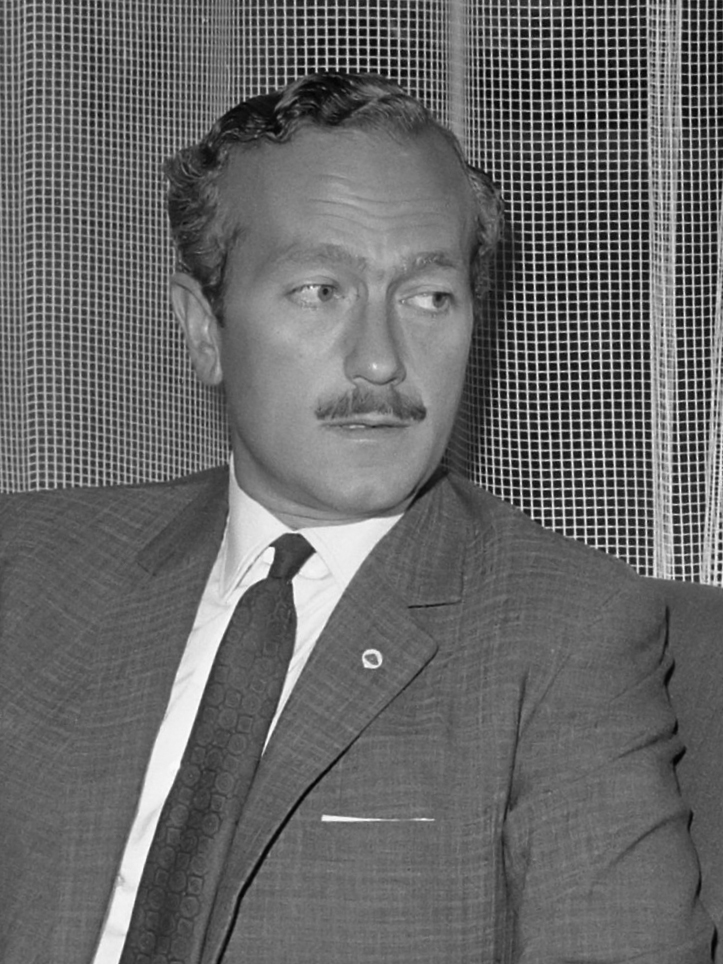
Colin Chapman

- 1 December – Thomas Halliwell, Anglican priest (born 1900)
- 2 December
  - Marty Feldman, comedian and actor (born 1934)
  - Geoffrey Timms, mathematician (born 1903)
- 3 December – Ralph Pugh, historian (born 1910)
- 4 December
  - Henry Price, company director and politician (born 1911)
  - Ivor Williams, artist (born 1908)
- 5 December – Reza Fallah, exiled businessman (born 1909, Persia)
- 6 December – Raymond Greene, physician and mountaineer (born 1901)
- 8 December
  - Philip Nash, English cricketer and civil servant (born 1906)
  - Isabel Wilson, psychiatrist (born 1895)
- 9 December – Sir Godfrey Mitchell, construction engineer (born 1891)
- 12 December – William McMullen, Northern Irish politician (born 1888)
- 16 December – Colin Chapman, automotive engineer (born 1928)
- 17 December – Richarda Morrow-Tait, first woman to fly an aircraft round the world (born 1923)
- 18 December – Sir Richard Sheppard, architect (born 1910)
- 19 December
  - Lawrance Collingwood, composer, conductor and record producer (born 1887)
  - Terence O'Brien, Olympic rower (born 1906)
  - Michael Strickland, Army major-general (born 1913)
- 20 December – Jane Arden, film actress and director (born 1927; suicide)
- 21 December – Gladys Henson, film actress (born 1897)
- 24 December
  - Noel Holmes, Army major-general and tennis player (born 1891)
  - Sir John Valentine Wistar Shaw, colonial administrator (born 1894)
- 26 December – Leslie Fox, World War II hero and George Cross recipient (born 1904)
- 27 December – Sir Sebag Shaw, judge (born 1906)
- 28 December – William Grasar, Roman Catholic prelate (born 1913)
- 29 December – Jack Brett, motorcycle racer (born 1917)
- 30 December – Philip Hall, mathematician (born 1904)
- 31 December
  - John Collins, Anglican clergyman (born 1905)
  - Johnny Curley, boxer (born 1897)
  - Derek Ridgewell, convicted robber (born 1945)

== See also ==
- 1982 in British music
- 1982 in British television
- List of British films of 1982
