= Heymer =

Heymer or Haymar may refer to:

- Haymar, Syria, village in Aleppo Governorate, Syria
- Haymar, Iran, village in Gilan Province, Iran
- John E. Heymer, British police officer (born 1934)
- Armin Heymer, ichthyologist who classified the Yellow-headed goby
