= Robert Westwater =

Scottish mining engineer

Dr Robert Westwater OBE FRSE FIME (7 September 1908– 2 October 1982) was a Scottish mining engineer and explosives expert. He was President of the Mining Institute of Scotland 1965/66. He was known to friends and colleagues as Bob Westwater.

== Life ==
He was born in the mining town of Lochgelly in central Fife on 7 September 1908, the eldest of four children of John C. Westwater, a coalminer from a long line of coalminers. He was educated at Lochgelly Public School then Dunfermline High School.

He was apprenticed to the Lochgelly Iron and Coal Company around 1923 under Wallace Thorneycroft and George Arthur Mitchell. They encouraged him to train as a mining engineer and he went to the University of Edinburgh to study formally, graduating with a BSc in 1929. He then returned for a few years to Lochgelly before obtaining a post in the Explosives Division of ICI in 1934. In this role he would have played a significant contribution during the Second World War. In 1954 he became Assistant Manager and in 1955 became Manager of the Explosives Section of ICI.

He received an honorary doctorate (PhD) from the University of Edinburgh in 1954. In 1960 he was elected a Fellow of the Royal Society of Edinburgh. His proposers were Robert McAdam, Hugh Bryan Nisbet, James Pickering Kendall, and Sir Edmund Hirst. He received an Order of the British Empire (OBE) in 1966.

He died at home, 62 Caledonia Road in Saltcoats in Ayrshire on 2 October 1982.

== Family ==
In 1937 he married Phyllis Normand.

== Publications ==
- The Use of Explosives for Demolition (1955) with D H Brook
- Mining Explosives (1958) with Robert McAdam
