= Shaun Wallace (disambiguation) =

Shaun (or Sean) Wallace (or Wallis) may refer to:

- Sean Wallace (born 1976), American editor and publisher
- Shaun Wallace (born 1960), English barrister and TV quiz show personality
- Shaun Wallace (cyclist) (born 1961), British cyclist
- Shaun Wallis (born 1982), English ice hockey player

== See also ==
- Wallace Shawn (born 1943), American actor and writer
