= Darlow =

Darlow may refer to:

- Darlow (surname)
- Darlow, Kansas
