= Baron Jones =

Baron Jones or Lord Jones may refer to:

- Barry Jones, Baron Jones (born 1939), Labour Party politician in the United Kingdom
- Michael Jones, Lord Jones (1948–2016), Scottish judge
- Digby Jones, Baron Jones of Birmingham (born 1955), British businessman and politician
- Nigel Jones, Baron Jones of Cheltenham (born 1948), Liberal Democrat politician in the United Kingdom
- Baron Jones of Naven, a subsidiary title held by Viscount Ranelagh
- Carwyn Jones, Baron Jones of Penybont (born 1967), First Minister of Wales from 2009 to 2018

The following people either use a title which does not include Jones or have double-barrelled names:

- Antony Armstrong-Jones, Baron Armstrong-Jones (1930–2017), 1st Earl of Snowdon
- Kevan Jones, Baron Beamish (born 1964), British Labour politician
- Alun Jones, Baron Chalfont
- Timothy Clement-Jones, Baron Clement-Jones (born 1949), Liberal Democrat Peer and their spokesman for the Creative Industries in the House of Lords
- Elwyn Jones, Baron Elwyn-Jones (1909–1989), Welsh barrister and Labour politician
- Tristan Garel-Jones, Baron Garel-Jones
- Thomas Jones, Baron Maelor (1898–1984), British Labour politician
- Pauline Neville-Jones, Baroness Neville-Jones (born 1939), former BBC Governor and Chairman of the British Joint Intelligence Committee (JIC)
- Samuel Jones-Loyd, 1st Baron Overstone (1796–1883), British banker and politician
- Leifchild Jones, 1st Baron Rhayader
- William Wynne-Jones, Baron Wynne-Jones (1903–1982), British chemist

== See also ==
- Baroness Jones (disambiguation)
- Jones (disambiguation)
- Jones (surname), a surname of English origins, meaning "John's son"
