= Death of Jeannie Saffin =

Subject of spontaneous human combustion claims

Jeannie Saffin
- Born: Jeanne Lucille Saffin; 20 March 1921; Edmonton, London, England
- Died: 23 September 1982 (aged 61); Northwood, London, England
- Cause of death: Pneumonia due to spontaneous human combustion (presumably)
- Known for: Odd circumstances surrounding death

Jeanne Lucille Saffin (20 March 1921 – 23 September 1982) was a British woman whose death from fire in 1982 is cited by paranormal researchers and authors as an example of spontaneous human combustion, and is reported to be the most recent suspected case in the UK. Aspects of the reports made immediately after her injury and death apparently supported the conclusion that her death was due to spontaneous human combustion; John E. Heymer devoted a chapter of his 1996 book The Entrancing Flame to the case. However, later research has cast doubt on some of the evidence and refutes the claims that her injuries were caused by spontaneous human combustion.

== Death ==
Jeannie Saffin was born in Edmonton, London with birth defects that caused intellectual disabilities, limiting her cognitive function to the level of a child. She was 61 years old when she died. On the evening of September 15, 1982, she was in her family's home in Edmonton with her father, Jack Saffin, and her brother-in-law, Don Carroll. Jeannie was sitting with her father in the kitchen. Jack Saffin was looking away from Jeannie when his attention was drawn to his daughter as she was suddenly on fire. Jack Saffin and his son-in-law Don Carroll put out the fire using water from the kitchen, and then called for an ambulance. Jeannie was treated en route to the hospital by paramedics, admitted to North Middlesex Hospital, and then transferred to the burn unit at Mount Vernon Hospital, where she was treated until her death caused by "broncho-pneumonia due to burns" eight days after the original fire and injury. Relatives suggested at the inquest that the death could have been a case of spontaneous human combustion, but the coroner, Dr John Burton, said there was "no such thing" and gave an open verdict.

== Spontaneous human combustion ==
Saffin's case has been held as an example of spontaneous human combustion by paranormal researchers and authors. Jack Saffin's son-in-law, Don Carroll, who was in the home at the time of the fire, has stated that Jeannie had flames coming from her mouth, and made roaring noises like a dragon. Both Carroll and Jack Saffin have repeatedly claimed that prior to Jeannie being lit aflame there was no source of ignition in the kitchen except the pilot light on the gas stove. Carroll also states that Jeannie's clothes were unburned and that there was no smoke damage in the kitchen. The interpretation of Heymer and Arnold's works have led to Saffin's case as being quoted as proof of spontaneous human combustion by researchers and authors anxious to make the case for spontaneous human combustion.

An alternate view debunks the evidence pointing towards Saffin being an example of spontaneous human combustion. Proponents of the combustion theory have stated that Saffin "came to be burned inside unburned clothes," However, later research noted by Joe Nickell suggests that Saffin's clothes were burned. In a written statement given at the time of Saffin's death, 12 years before the interview conducted by Heymer, Carroll stated that Saffin's clothes were severely burned. Also, police reports indicated that upon their arrival, constables witnessed Jeannie's clothing burning and removed it after putting out the flames.

The source of the flames has also been scrutinized by skeptics. Carroll has stated that the flames came from Saffin's mouth; however, the medical evidence does not support this conclusion: Saffin's mouth was undamaged, according to hospital records. Medical records also support the conclusion that the majority of Saffin's burns were the result of contact with burning or melted nylon from her clothing. The burning and melting patterns of her nylon clothing could make it appear that the fire was coming from inside Saffin's body.

Opponents of the spontaneous human combustion theory also have a potential explanation for the source of the flame that ignited Saffin's clothing, causing the fire. Carroll made several statements that the only source of flame in the kitchen was the pilot light for the stove. In one interview he specifically noted that Jack Saffin's pipe was unlit and filled with fresh tobacco. Nickell outlines a plausible explanation, that Jack Saffin knocked out used tobacco from his pipe in order to refill it, and that while doing so, caused lit embers of pipe tobacco to land on Jeannie's clothing. Nickell suggests this is even more likely, because at the time of the fire, the kitchen window and door were open, causing a cross breeze. Pipe embers, carried by the breeze and then landing on Saffin's flammable nylon clothing, would easily catch fire and cause the severe burns found on Saffin's body at autopsy.
