= Darlow (surname) =

Darlow is a surname. Notable people with the surname include:

- Cynthia Darlow (born 1949), American actress
- David Darlow (film producer) (born 1942), British film producer and director
- David Darlow (actor) (born 1943), American actor and stage director
- Julia Donovan Darlow, American attorney
- Karl Darlow (born 1990), British footballer
- Kieran Darlow (born 1982), British footballer
- Michael Darlow (born 1934), British television producer, director, and writer
- Scott Darlow (born 1983), Australian singer, songwriter, guitarist, didgeridoo player, and public speaker
- Sue Darlow (1960–2011), Indian photographer
