= Baroness Jones =

Baroness Jones may refer to:

- Jenny Jones, Baroness Jones of Moulsecoomb (born 1949), British Green Party politician
- Maggie Jones, Baroness Jones of Whitchurch (born 1955), British Labour Party politician and trade unionist

== See also ==
- Baron Jones (disambiguation)
