= Philip Nash =

English civil servant and cricketer

Personal information
- Full name: Philip Geoffrey Elwin Nash
- Born: 20 September 1906; Accrington, Lancashire, England
- Died: 8 December 1982 (aged 76); Old Basing, Hampshire, England
- Batting: Right-handed
- Bowling: Right-arm medium

Domestic team information
- Years: Team
- 1924–1930: Berkshire
- 1928: Oxford University

Career statistics
Competition	First-class
Matches	1
Runs scored	16
Batting average	8.00
100s/50s	–/–
Top score	14
Balls bowled	48
Wickets	–
Bowling average	–
5 wickets in innings	–
10 wickets in match	–
Best bowling	–
Catches/stumpings	–/–
- Source: Cricinfo, 7 October 2012

Philip Geoffrey Elwin Nash CBE (20 September 1906 – 8 December 1982) was an English civil servant who worked in India and Burma during colonial rule and a broadcasting administrator at the British Broadcasting Corporation. He also played first-class cricket. He was born at Accrington, Lancashire, and died at Old Basing, Hampshire.

== Cricket career ==
Nash was a right-handed batsman who bowled right-arm medium pace. He was educated at St Paul's School, London and at Worcester College, Oxford University.

Nash played minor counties cricket for Berkshire, making his debut for the county in the 1924 Minor Counties Championship against Northumberland. He made eighteen further appearances for Berkshire, the last of which came against Oxfordshire in the 1930 Minor Counties Championship. He made just a single first-class appearance for Oxford University against Lancashire at the University Parks in 1928. In a match which Lancashire won by an innings and 80 runs, Nash was dismissed for 2 runs by Frank Watson in Oxford University's first-innings, while in their second-innings he was dismissed for 14 runs by Ted McDonald.

== Career outside cricket ==
Nash studied at the London School of Economics after leaving Oxford and then joined the Indian Civil Service in 1931. He was secretary to the Burmese delegation to the 1937 Coronation and the Imperial Conference of that year, and during the Second World War was superintendent of provinces in Burma, when he was captured by the Japanese. He walked to freedom in India and was then principal at the Burma Office, before returning to be secretary to the Viceroy during independence from 1946 to 1948. Later he joined the BBC as head of the Burmese, Vietnamese and Chinese programmes, becoming head of Far Eastern services before retiring in 1967 through ill-health. He had been appointed Commander of the Order of the British Empire in 1948.
