= Raymond Toole Stott =

Raymond Toole Stott MBE

Raymond Toole Stott MBE (1910–1982) was a bibliographer and historian of the circus and its allied arts. He wrote A Bibliography of English Conjuring, 1581-1876, a definitive book on conjuring.

Toole Stott was a friend of Somerset Maugham and compiled a bibliography of Maugham's writings. In addition to his work as a bibliographer, Toole Stott was Librarian and Departmental Records Officer, H.M. Procurator General and Treasury Solicitor.

== Life ==
Toole Stott was born in 1910, the son of a Norfolk vicar. He was educated at St John's School, Leatherhead after which he began a career in journalism.

Toole Stott is best known for his bibliography of publications on the Circus and Allied Arts that were published between 1958 and 1970. He also worked as a press agent for Bertram Mills between 1930 and 1940 before joining the Royal Air Force during World War II. After the war he resumed an earlier collaboration with Somerset Maugham compiling a bibliography of Maugham's writings. In addition to his work as a bibliographer, Toole Stott was Librarian and Departmental Records Officer, H.M. Procurator General and Treasury Solicitor, for which he was made MBE.

Toole Stott died on 10 January 1982 at his home in Westminster, London.
