= Alice Walker (scholar) =

British literary scholar

- Born: 8 December 1900; Crumpsall, Manchester, England
- Died: 14 October 1982 (aged 81); Plymouth Hospital, Plymouth, England

Alice Walker (8 December 1900 – 14 October 1982) was a British scholar of the Elizabethan and Jacobean writer Thomas Lodge and the poet and playwright William Shakespeare.

== Life ==
Walker was born in 1900 in Crumpsall in Manchester. Her parents were George Edward and Mary Alice Walker. She went to school at Blackburn High School for Girls. She did well at Royal Holloway College graduating in 1923 and three years later she gained her doctorate for her thesis on the Elizabethan and Jacobean writer Thomas Lodge. She decided that she should write a four volume description of Lodge's works and obtained a Jex-Blake scholarship.

She travelled for a year before beginning three years of lecturing at the Royal Holloway from 1928 to 1931 and then she does not appear to have taken paid work until she became a librarian in 1939. In 1933 she published The Life of Thomas Lodge again about this physician and writer of the sixteenth century.

She became an expert on the works of William Shakespeare publishing editions of his work. She was known for saying that there would never be a definitive version of his work unless a law was passed to decide it.

Walker died at Plymouth Hospital in 1982.

== Works ==
- Life of Thomas Lodge, 1933
- The Arte of English Poesie, with Gladys Doidge Willcock, 1934
- Edward Capell and his edition of Shakespeare, 1960
- Othello
- Textual problems of the First Folio Richard III, King Lear, Troilus & Cressida, 2 Henry IV, Hamlet, Othello
- Troilus and Cressida
- The Two Gentlemen of Verona: a concordance to the text of the first folio works
