= Geoffrey Timms =

British mathematician

Geoffrey Timms OBE FRSE (1903–1982) was a 20th century British mathematician and cryptoanalyst. In the Second World War he was one of the several mathematicians working alongside Alan Turing at Bletchley Park breaking the Enigma code.

== Life ==
He was born in Bradford on 16 February 1903, son of Frederick Timms (1865-1947), Managing Director of a rope company, and Clara Louisa Barraclough (1867-1946). Both his parents were from Leeds.

He studied Mathematics at the University of Leeds graduating MA in 1925, then did postgraduate studies at Cambridge University, gaining his doctorate (PhD) in 1928. In 1929 he began lecturing in mathematics at St Andrews University.

In 1933 he was elected a Fellow of the Royal Society of Edinburgh. His proposers were fellow physicians Herbert Westren Turnbull, Edward Thomas Copson, Alexander Craig Aitken and Sir Edmund Taylor Whittaker.

A recognised mathematical genius he was seconded to work on the cracking of the Enigma code during the Second World War. He officially resigned from St Andrews in September 1945 to continue working with the Foreign Office, and got a position at GCHQ.

In retired in 1968.

He died on 2 December 1982 in Auckland, New Zealand.
