= Lawrence Stenhouse =

British academic (1926–1982)

Lawrence Stenhouse (29 March 1926 – 5 September 1982) was a British educational thinker who sought to promote an active role for teachers in educational research and curriculum development

== Life ==
Stenhouse was born in 1926 and was educated at Manchester Grammar School, the University of St Andrews and the University of Glasgow (MEd).

In 1970, he was the leader and one of the four founder members of the Centre for Applied Research in Education (CARE) at the University of East Anglia. Another of the members was Jean Ruddock, and they became partners.

Stenhouse helped to develop innovative classwork for secondary school pupils through the Schools Council Humanities Project. He also served as the President of the British Educational Research Association (BERA). In 2013, the University of East Anglia renamed their 'Education' building after him.

== Works ==
- An Introduction to Curriculum Research and Development (1975)
- Authority, Education and Emancipation (1983)
- Research as a Basis for Teaching: Readings from the Work of Lawrence Stenhouse (1985)
