= Chrystabel Procter =

English gardener, educationalist and horticulturalist (1894–1982)

- Born: 11 March 1894; Kensington Square, Royal Borough of Kensington and Chelsea, England
- Died: 21 June 1982 (aged 88); Weston-super-Mare England
- Known for: Gardening and horticulture

Chrystabel Prudence Goldsmith Procter (11 March 1894 – 21 June 1982) was an English gardener, educationalist and horticulturalist. Her career focused particularly on involving institutions and people in growing their own crops and on the education of women.

== Early life ==
Chrystabel Procter was born in London on 11 March 1894, at 11 Kensington Square, the daughter of Joseph Procter, a stockbroker, and Elizabeth Procter (née Brockbank), an artist. Her grandfather, William Brockbank, was a wealthy Manchester businessman, a patron of the arts and an accomplished amateur naturalist. Family interests in the arts and sciences influenced both Chrystabel and her younger sister, Joan Beauchamp Procter (b. 1897). The family homes had large gardens, which facilitated the sisters’ childhood pursuits in natural history, and they were nicknamed "Flora" (Chrystabel) and "Fauna" (Joan).

She was educated at St Paul's Girls' School, London, where she studied chemistry and botany, and then at Glynde College for Lady Gardeners, Sussex. Deaf from her mid-teens as a result of an hereditary condition on her mother's side of the family, she had been steered towards a career as a horticulturalist rather than continuing formal studies as an academic botanist.

== Career ==
Chrystabel Procter was Gardener at St Paul's Girls' School from 1916–25, and was also Gardening Mistress for much of that period. She went on to become Head Gardener of Bingley Teacher Training College in Yorkshire before taking up her best-known role as Garden Steward at Girton College, Cambridge (as well as being an Examiner in Gardening at Homerton College) in 1933.

At Girton she was responsible for the management of the college gardens, grounds, and grounds staff. This remit included the supply of fruit and vegetables to the kitchens throughout the rationing period of the Second World War.

From the end of the war until her retirement in 1950 Chrystabel Procter became Estate Steward to Bryanston School in Blandford, Dorset. In retirement she travelled to East Africa and lived for several years at the Teachers’ Training College in Kaimosi, Kenya, where her friend Helen Neatby had been appointed Head.

== Later life ==
In the early 1960s ill health forced Chrystabel and Helen to return to England, where they settled in Somerset. Procter wrote a biography of Neatby, Helen Neatby: A Quaker in Africa (1973). Procter became a Quaker in the 1960s, but rejoined the Roman Catholic church in her last years. Procter died in 1982, at a nursing home in Weston-super-Mare, aged 88 years. Her papers are archived at the Girton College Library at the University of Cambridge.
