= Alan Coddington =

English academic

Alan Coddington (27 November 1941 – 8 June 1982) was an English academic who made significant contributions to the field of economics in the areas of collective bargaining, Keynesian economics, and economic methodology.

Coddington was born in Doncaster, got his BSc degree in 1963 from Leeds University, and DPhil in 1966 from University of York. He took up teaching at the University of London, Queen Mary College, in 1966, where he remained until his death in London in 1982, aged just 40. At that institution, he built his reputation in the area of Keynesian Economics. His focus was on first principles, in which he added notable contributions to the Keynesian literature such as hydraulic Keynesianism, which established that there are stable macroeconomic flow inherent in the Keynesian system for its functioning in the policy area, without having to fall back on accounting flows.

Coddington methodological contribution to economics was based on positive economics, where his presentation of the propositions as Stylize Facts has help to popularize the methodology. He contribution in bargaining theory was not just to recite the Cournot or Nash behavioral assumptions in economics, but to seek new a new research program for the formation of agents action-reaction behavior.
