= Reza Fallah =

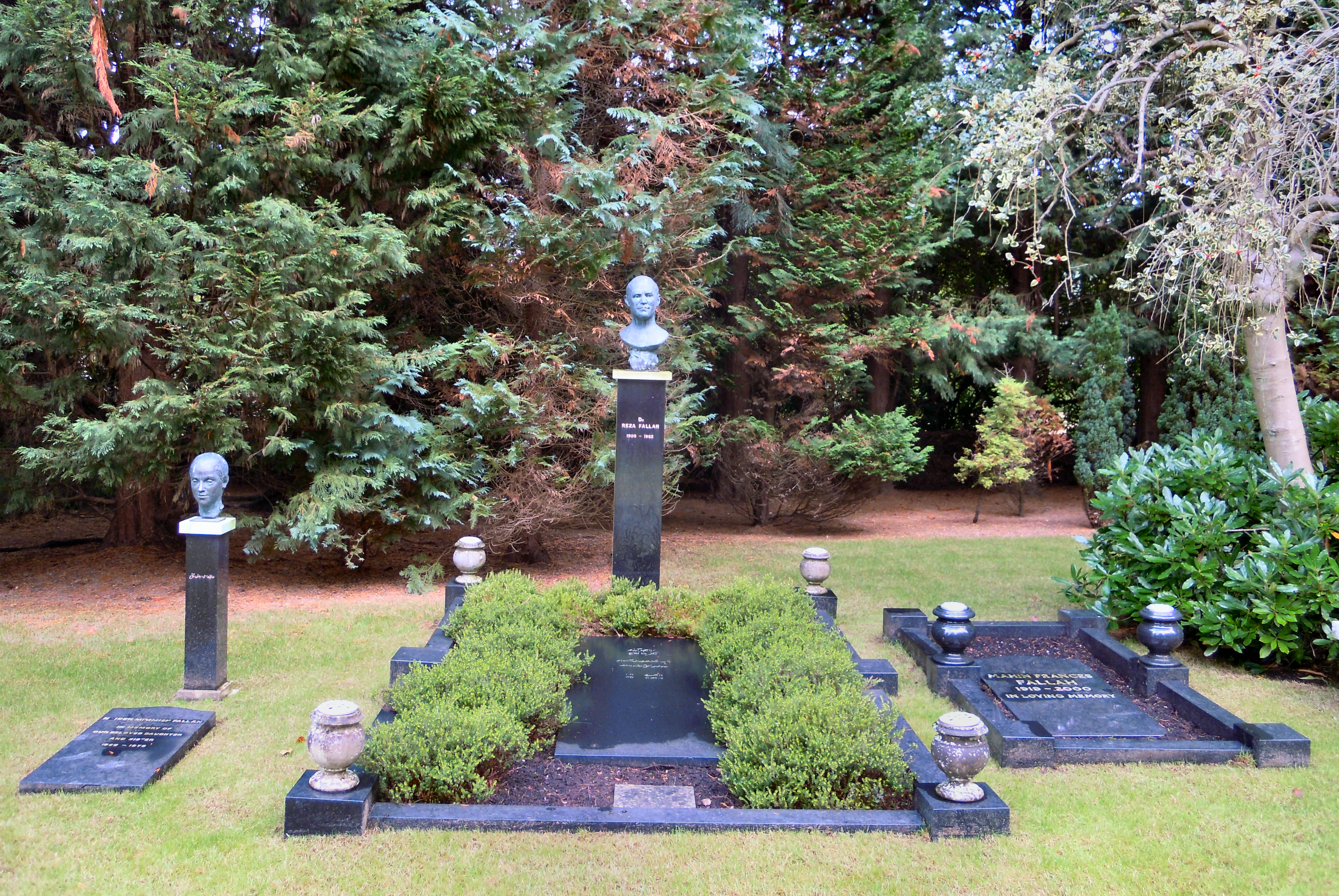
- The grave of Reza Fallah in Brookwood Cemetery
- Born: 15 September 1909; Kashan, Iran
- Died: 5 December 1982 (aged 73); Windsor, England
- Resting place: Brookwood Cemetery, England
- Education: University of Birmingham
- Occupation(s): Businessman, political advisor
- Spouse: Maheen Fallah
- Children: Lilly Fallah Lawrence; Gina Fallah.

Reza Fallah (1909–1982) was an Iranian businessman and political advisor. He shaped the Iranian oil policy under Shah Mohammad Reza Pahlavi.

== Early life ==
Reza Fallah was born on 15 September 1909 in Kashan, Iran. He graduated from high school in Tehran. He studied Petroleum Engineering at the University of Birmingham in England on a BP scholarship, receiving a PhD.

== Career ==
In 1939, he returned to Iran and worked in the private sector. He then taught and served as Dean of the Abadan Technical Institute.

In the 1950s and 1960s, he served as general manager the Abadan Refinery, formerly owned by the Anglo-Iranian Oil Company. He served as deputy chairman of the National Iranian Oil Company from 1974 to 1979. During that time, he advised Shah Mohammad Reza Pahlavi and essentially shaped Iran's oil policy. He was also a co-founder of the Organization of Petroleum Exporting Countries (OPEC).

During the Iranian revolution of 1979, he accompanied the Shah into exile. He refused to return to Iran, despite being summoned by Prime Minister Mehdi Bazargan. Indeed, he was on Ayatollah Khomeini's death list.

== Personal life ==
He was married to Maheen Fallah (1919–2000). They had three daughters: Lilly Fallah Lawrence and Gina "Kooky" Fallah. A third daughter died in a car accident when they were living in Tehran.

== Death ==
He died on 5 December 1982 in Windsor, England. He is buried in Brookwood Cemetery.
