= Roy W. Chappell =

British flying ace (1896–1982)

Roy Williamson Chappell
- Born: 31 December 1896; Cheddleton, Leek, Cheshire, England
- Died: 7 February 1982 (aged 85); England
- Military career
- Allegiance: United Kingdom
- Branch: British Army; Royal Air Force
- Service years: 1915–1946
- Rank: Air Commodore
- Units: No. 27 Squadron RFC; No. 41 Squadron RAF
- Commands: No. 1 Squadron RAF
- Awards: Military Cross

Air Commodore Roy Williamson Chappell MC (31 December 1896 – 7 February 1982) began his military aviation career as a British World War I flying ace credited with 11 official aerial victories. He remained in service post-war, becoming an intelligence specialist on Japan and the Japanese military. He served through the end of World War II.

== World War I ==
Chappell entered military service during December 1915 as a private in the South African Cavalry. While so assigned, he fought in the Southwest African campaign against the Germans. He then joined Inns of Court Officers Training Corps in England, and was commissioned a temporary second lieutenant on 17 June 1916. He also underwent pilot's training, receiving Royal Aero Club pilot's certificate number 3329 on 17 July 1916; on 24 August 1916 Second Lieutenant R. W. Chappell was appointed a Flying Officer in the Royal Flying Corps. In September 1916, he was posted to 27 Squadron RFC as a Martinsyde Elephant pilot. On 27 September 1916, he became one of the few pilots to score a victory while flying the ungainly Elephant.

On 27 March 1917, Chappell scored a second "out of control" win while piloting an Elephant. He was withdrawn from combat during May 1917 and remanded to instructor duty at the Central Flying School. He was promoted to temporary captain and rated as a flight commander on 27 July 1917. In October 1917, he returned to the front as a flight commander and Royal Aircraft Factory SE.5a fighter pilot in 41 Squadron.

On 2 February 1918, Chappell destroyed a German Albatros D.V over Erchin and sent another down out of control. On 6 March, he drove down a Pfalz D.III fighter over Niergnies, and became an ace. Ten days later, he burned a German LVG reconnaissance two-seater over Brebières. A week later, on 23 March 1918, he sent down an Albatros D.V over Bourlon Wood. The next day, he drove down two Fokker Dr.I triplanes for his eighth and ninth wins. The following mid-morning, he destroyed an Albatros D.V over Sailly. There would be one final victory on 16 May 1918; a German reconnaissance machine was sent down out of control southeast of Arras.

Chappell carried his rank of temporary captain over into the new Royal Air Force on its formation on 1 April 1918, although he was confirmed in this rank at some time thereafter.

== Post World War I ==
On 28 October 1919, Chappell was granted a permanent commission in the Royal Air Force as a flight lieutenant, with his seniority in rank fixed as 1 August 1919. On 5 November 1919, he was assigned as a flight commander in the Air Council Inspection Squadron. The Inspection Squadron morphed into 24 Squadron; Chappell was assigned as flight commander on 1 February 1920. He continued as a flight commander, transferring on 13 December 1922 to 70 Squadron, and onwards on 20 February 1923 to 84 Squadron.

On 13 October 1923, he became supernumerary at the RAF Depot. On 11 February 1924, he was assigned to test pilot duties at the Inland Area Aircraft Depot. On 15 January 1925, he was assigned to attend the School for Oriental Studies. This led to his assignment as a Language Officer at Britain's Tokyo Embassy on 9 October 1925.

On 10 October 1928, he was promoted to squadron leader. On 11 February 1929, Chappell was assigned to Staff Duty with the Directorate of Operations and Intelligence. On 26 September 1930, he was seconded for duty with the Imperial Japanese Navy. On 7 April 1931, he returned to staff duty at DO&I. In June 1931, he requalified as a Japanese Interpreter, First Class.

On 12 November 1933, Chappell was appointed Officer Commanding, No. 1 Squadron. On 6 November 1935, he returned to Tokyo as an Air Attache. On 23 November 1934, he was appointed as acting but unpaid wing commander. On 1 July 1935, he was confirmed as wing commander.

On 10 February 1938, he was a supernumerary at No. 1 RAF Depot. On 1 December 1938, he was assigned as senior air staff officer (SASO), No. 22 (Army Co-operation) Group. 1 November 1938 saw his further promotion to group captain.

On 16 September 1939, he was appointed the deputy director of intelligence. On 29 September 1946, Chappell retired as a group captain, but retained the rank of air commodore. He died on 7 February 1982, after a long retirement.

== Honours and awards ==
Military Cross

T./Capt. Roy Williamson Chappell, R.F.C.

For conspicuous gallantry and devotion to duty. He showed the greatest skill and courage in leading patrols, with the result that during four days' operations the formations which he led destroyed 19 enemy aeroplanes and drove down several others, the fate of which was not observed, owing to the intensity of the fighting. He has destroyed altogether five enemy machines, and has driven down seven others out of control.
