= Leslie Fox (GC) =

Recipient of the George Cross

- Born: 4 December 1904; Fulham, London, England
- Died: 26 December 1982 (aged 78); Droxford, England
- Military career
- Allegiance: United Kingdom
- Branch: Civil Defence Service
- Conflicts: Second World War
- Awards: George Cross

Leslie Owen Fox, GC (4 December 1904 – 26 December 1982) was a Deputy Leader in the West Kensington Heavy Rescue Squad. He was awarded the George Cross for "performing his duty in a most gallant and determined manner" when rescuing an injured man from a bombsite in Fulham on 20 February 1944.

== George Cross ==
Leslie Owen Fox, a carpenter by trade, was a Deputy Leader in the West Kensington Heavy Rescue Squad. The Heavy Rescue Squad was a Civil Defence Service brigade detailed to make bombed out buildings as safe as possible so rescue of any trapped people could be attempted. The squad is usually composed of a bricklayer, a plumber, an electrician and a group of general labourers, all of whom completed a first aid course.

On 20 February 1944, Fox was called to the neighbouring borough of Fulham where a number of houses had been destroyed and incendiaries had set fire to the wreckage. Beneath the rubble cries of a trapped man could be heard and Fox started to tunnel towards him. Fox had to dig while being sprayed with water to prevent him being burned by the fires around him. After two hours of digging he managed to burrow 15 feet (4.6 m) and located two people. Fox returned to his comrades to discuss how to extricate the man but his tunnel then collapsed. Undeterred, he started digging again and soon shored up the tunnel, which allowed a trained first aider to enter and see to the injured man, who was subsequently safely removed.

Notice of his award was published in The London Gazette on 20 February 1945, reading:

The King has been graciously pleased to award the George Cross to:—Leslie Owen Fox, Deputy Party Leader, London County Council Heavy Rescue Service.

High explosive and incendiary bombs demolished houses and set fire to the wreckage. The walls were liable to collapse at any moment and the entire framework was well alight. Cries were heard from under the debris and Fox, without thought for himself, immediately began to tunnel his way through the blazing ruins. Debris passed back by Fox was often too hot to handle and his men continually sprayed him with water in an endeavour to keep down the almost intolerable heat from the flames. At great danger to himself Fox shored the entrance to the tunnel, adjoining which was a very dangerous party wall. After about two hours of very strenuous work and under the most difficult and dangerous conditions Fox located the casualty. Although in a distressed condition he would not allow a relief to take his place and continued rescue operations. Shortly afterwards the dangerous wall collapsed, blocking the entrance and causing the tunnel to subside. Fox, however recommenced tunnelling, straining every muscle to expedite the work. After a further two hours' work he had tunnelled 15 feet and was able to clear debris away from the head of the casualty and cover him with some sort of

protection. A Medical Officer was then enabled to enter and administer restoratives to the injured man, who was eventually brought to safety. Fox performed his duty in a most gallant and determined manner and, by his courage and tenacity, saved a man from what appeared to be almost certain death.

== Sale of medal ==
Fox's George Cross was sold in June 2008 and reached a hammer price of £20,000.
