= Denise Lester =

British teacher who founded the Queen Elizabeth's School in Lisbon

- Born: Margaret Denise Eileen Lester; 29 March 1909; London
- Died: 18 June 1982 (aged 73); Lisbon
- Occupation: Educator
- Known for: Founder of Queen Elizabeth’s School in Lisbon, Portugal

Denise Lester OBE was a British teacher who founded the bilingual Queen Elizabeth's School in Lisbon, Portugal in 1935 and was also the founder of the first Girl Guides group for Portuguese girls.

== Early life ==
Margaret Denise Eileen Lester was born in London on 29 March 1909, the daughter of Gordon and Margaret Lester. Her mother suffered from a rare and disabling disease, which Denise inherited. Between the ages of 5 and 18 she attended boarding school at Abingdon-on-Thames, near Oxford. At the age of nineteen, she decided to take a job looking after children of an English family living on the Portuguese island of Madeira and then worked as a governess of the four children of the British Consul on the island. With the transfer of the Consul to France, Lester stayed in Madeira, doing translations for a commercial firm and working at the German school as an English teacher. It was this that first sparked her first ideas of creating an English school for Portuguese children. Although there had previously been Girl Guide groups among the expatriate British families of Portugal, while in Madeira, she started the first Girl Guides group for Portuguese girls, receiving a visit from Baden-Powell in 1931. She prepared herself, through a two-year correspondence course, to obtain a qualification in the Fröbel education system, completing this with one year studying in the United Kingdom.

Lester then went to work in the south of France, considered to offer a climate more favourable to her health problems, at the request of the Girl Guide movement. At the same time, she taught English at a private school. With the collapse of that school, she returned to England. She was then sent by the Guides to Lisbon, enabling her to develop her idea of an English-language school for Portuguese children.

== Lisbon ==
After working for some time as an English teacher in a private home, Lester opened the Queen Elizabeth's School (QES) on 3 November 1935 with just 6 students, in a borrowed room and the garden at the home of Sophia and Fortunato Abecassis, with the encouragement of the then Minister of Foreign Affairs, Armindo Monteiro. In parallel with following the official Portuguese curriculum, the children were taught English. In 1936, the school was officially recognized by the Ministry of National Education. It moved to a new location in 1938 and again in 1940. During World War II, the number of students dropped considerably and Lester worked four hours per night at the British Council to cover the school's costs. She also helped raise funds for charities, and the school both served as a centre to help refugees and admitted refugee children. Between 1935 and 1945, children of 27 different nationalities attended the school. In April 1943 she received an award from the Red Cross for her work in furthering the aims of that organization. In 1947 she was made a Member of the British Empire (MBE).

In September 1949, the Portuguese government issued a law banning joint education of girls and boys. Lester was forced to consider a new change of facilities. Thanks to a donation from the British Government, she was able to take out a bank loan to build the current facilities. The current school building, at Rua Filipe Magalhães, was officially opened on 6 October 1952. The school celebrated its 25th anniversary in 1961. Sir David Eccles, the British Minister of Education attended the celebrations, together with Francisco Leite Pinto, the Portuguese Minister of Education, and the British Ambassador.

== The Denise Lester Foundation ==
Denise Lester had numerous operations throughout her life due to the rare blood-circulation problem she had inherited from her mother. These culminated in April 1964 when she had both legs amputated. Feeling that she did not have long to live, she set in motion the establishment of the Denise Lester Foundation, to ensure the proper continuity of the school. The draft statutes were discussed with many people, including Marcelo Caetano, a personal friend who was on the first Board of Directors of the Foundation, and who would become Portugal's Prime Minister in 1969 and, in that capacity, would attend the school's 35th anniversary celebrations in 1970. In the statutes, it was specified that Queen Elizabeth's School would always be a British School for Portuguese children, would have six British teachers, and would have the privilege to raise both flags and sing both national anthems on solemn occasions. The role of the Foundation goes beyond just that of running the school: it also seeks to pursue other educational, cultural and social activities.

In 1971, Portugal made Lester an Officer of the Order of Public Instruction and in 1972 she was made an Officer of the Order of the British Empire (OBE). In the same year she visited Angola and Mozambique and described her travels in Lisbon-based newspapers, including the Anglo-Portuguese News. In 1976, the first changes were made to the Board of the Foundation, with Joaquim Pedro Benthein Noronha Morais Pinto de Oliveira Martins taking over from Marcelo Caetano, following the latter's exile after the Carnation Revolution overthrew Portugal's Estado Novo dictatorship.

Denise Lester died in Lisbon, on 18 June 1982. In 1985, when celebrating the school's 50th anniversary, the school published her autobiography, Look up – There's always a star.

== Awards and honours ==
- Award from the Red Cross of Portugal in 1943
- Member of the Order of the British Empire (MBE) in 1947
- Officer of the Order of Public Instruction in 1971
- Officer of the Order of the British Empire (OBE) in 1972
