= Wallace Thorneycroft =

British mining engineer, businessman, coal-mine owner and geologist

Wallace Thorneycroft FRSE MIME MISI JP (1864–1954) was a 19th/20th century British mining engineer, businessman, coal-mine owner and geologist. He was President of the Institute of Mining Engineers. As a geologist and archaeologist he was an expert on vitrified forts and one of the first to undertake practical experiments to establish their mode of construction.

== Life ==
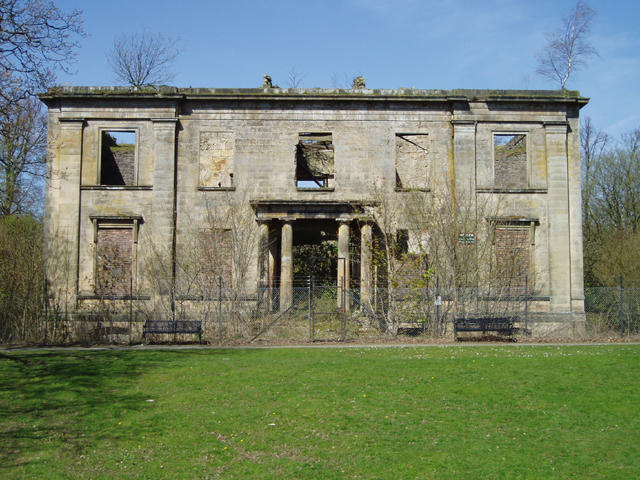
The remains of Plean House

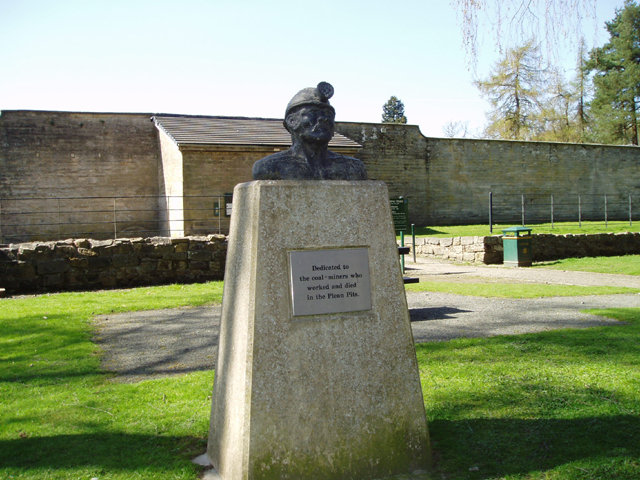
Mining Memorial, Plean Country Park

He was born in Dorchester on 24 February 1864, the son of Thomas Thorneycroft, and his wife, Jane Whitelaw. The family moved to the Mansion House in Tettenhall in his youth. He was educated privately at Charterhouse School. He studied Mining Engineering at Owen's College in Manchester then was apprenticed to Simpson and Rankine in Glasgow.

He trained as a mining engineer and based himself in central Scotland. His first position was as manager of Merrytown Colliery in Hamilton from 1889, then moving eastwards, and living at 25 Snowdon Place in Stirling from 1896.

In 1894 he rented the Plean estate to open a colliery, from 1897 living himself on-site at Plean House, near Stirling in central Scotland, the former mansion of the late William Simpson of the East India Company. The estate had been historically part of the lands owned by Robert Haldane of Airthrey Castle. Plean House was built by Francis Simpson in 1819. The Simpson family held title to the estate until 1922 when it was bought in its entirety by Thorneycroft.

In 1902 he also became Director of Lochgelly Coal and Iron Co. in central Fife.

In 1907 he was elected a Fellow of the Royal Society of Edinburgh. His proposers were fellow geologists John Horne, Ben Peach, Sir John Smith Flett and L. W. Hinxman.

His East Plean mine suffered a major underground explosion in 1922 with many dead and injured. Of the 520 total mining workforce 12 were killed at 59 injured.

In 1937 he came to relative fame in Europe by experimenting on recreating conditions to create a vitrified fort, this being in liaison with archaeologist Vere Gordon Childe. These experiments took place at one of his own mines: Plean Colliery.

He retired to Strete Ralegh, a mansion in Whimple, Dorset but retained Directorship of his Plean and Lochgelly companies.

He died in Weymouth on 26 April 1954 aged 90.

His colliery at Plean was closed in 1963 and is now just marked by a memorial.

Plean House was vacated by the Thorneycroft family in 1972 and is now ruinous. The estate and former colliery and slag-heaps were acquired by Stirling District Council in 1988 and the colliery area relandscaped. The combined areas now form Plean Country Park.

== Family ==
He married Margaret Campbell and they had at least six children.

== Publications ==
- Childe, V. G. & Thorneycroft, W. (1938), The Experimental Production of the Phenomena Distinctive of Vitrified Forts. Proceedings of the Society of Antiquaries of Scotland 72, 44–55. / ADS
