= Meyer Oppenheim =

Financier and philanthropist (1906–1982)

Meyer Oppenheim (December 28, 1905 – May 24, 1982) was a financier and philanthropist in Edinburgh, Scotland. He was chairman of James Grant & Co and Argyle Securities.

The family lived in The White House in Barnton which was later owned by David Murray and then the writer J.K. Rowling.

Oppenheim bought the Royal Lyceum Theatre in 1960. He planned to demolish the building but later transferred ownership to the city in 1964. His company Argyle Securities also developed Argyle House in Edinburgh, which later became a location backdrop for a number of TV dramas.

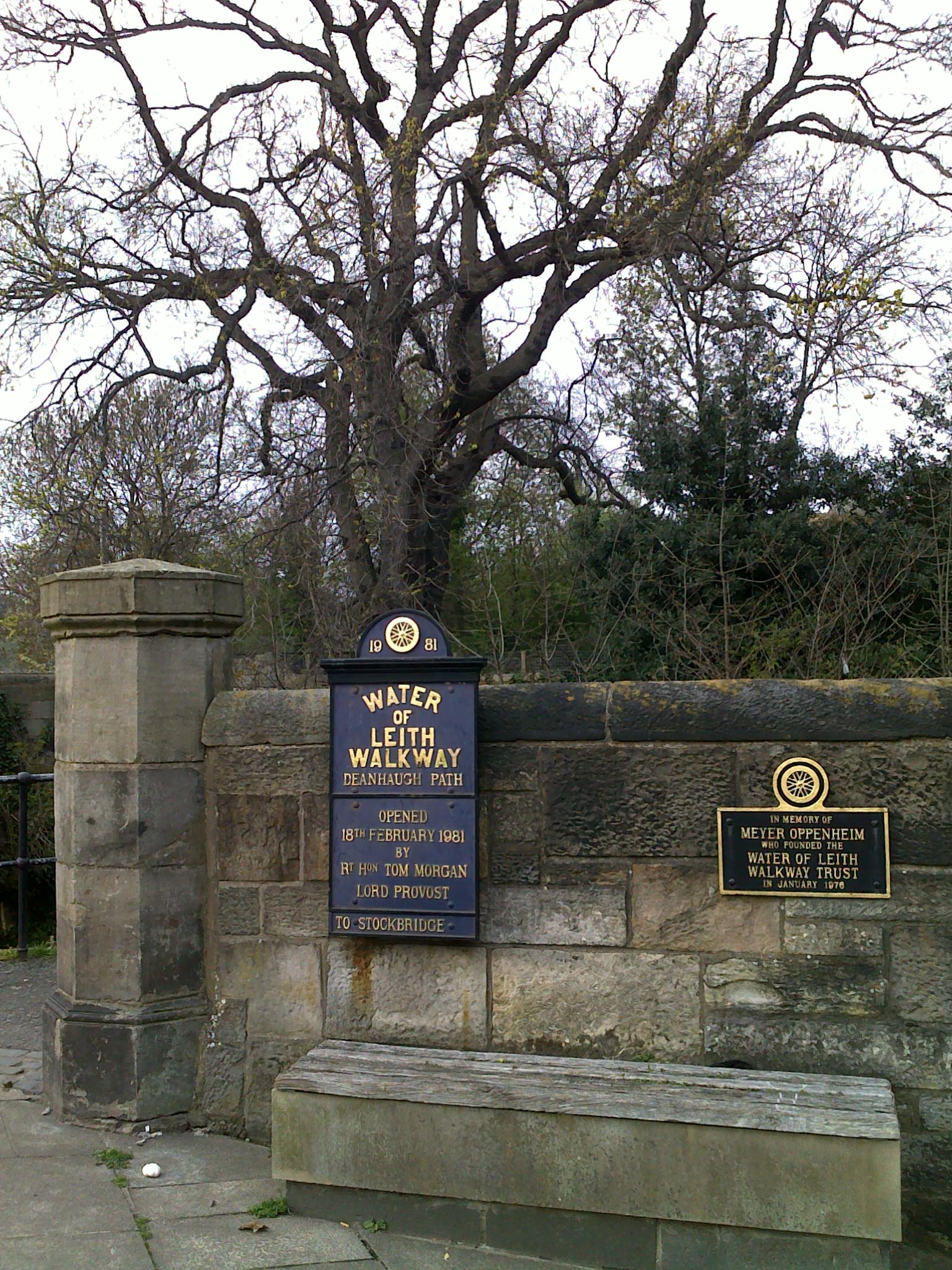
Plaques commemorating the opening of the first section of the Water of Leith Walkway in 1981 and Meyer Oppenheim.

He established the Meyer Oppenheim Trust and the Water of Leith Walkway Trust. A plaque on the walkway commemorates his contribution.

He endowed the Royal Scottish Academy with an annual RSA Meyer Oppenheim Prize for work in any medium by an artist under the age of 35.

He is buried in Piershill Cemetery, Edinburgh.
