= Institution of Mining Engineers =

British professional association

The Institution of Mining Engineers (IMinE) was a former British professional institution.

== History ==
It began as the Federated Institution of Mining Engineers in 1889, comprising the Chesterfield and Midland Counties Institution of Engineers; Midland Institute of Mining, Civil and Mechanical Engineers; North of England Institute of Mining and Mechanical Engineers; South Staffordshire and East Worcestershire Institute of Mining Engineers and later the North Staffordshire Institute of Mining and Mechanical Engineers, the Mining Institute of Scotland and the Manchester Geological and Mining Society. It was given a Royal Charter in 1915. In the early 1980s it became affiliated with Group Four of the Engineering Council; there were fifty-one affiliated engineering organisations to the Engineering Council.

=== Mergers ===
It merged with the National Association of Colliery Managers, effective from 23 October 1968. In 1995 it merged with the Institution of Mining Electrical and Mining Mechanical Engineers. Soon after discussions about a merger with the Institution of Mining and Metallurgy, founded in 1892, took place, which it merged with in 2002.

=== Presidents ===
- 1889-90 John Marley
- 1890-92 Thomas William Embleton
- 1900 Henry Copson Peake
- c.1900 - Wallace Thorneycroft
- 1923 John Brass

== Structure ==
It was headquartered at Cleveland House on City Road in London.

== Function ==
Fellows of the institution took the initials FIMinE.

=== Awards ===
It awarded the Medal of the Institution of Mining Engineers.

== See also ==
- List of engineering societies
- North of England Institute of Mining and Mechanical Engineers
