= Haymar, Iran =

Haymar حايمر
- Village
- Country: Iran
- Province: Gilan
- County: Talesh
- Bakhsh: Central
- Rural District: Tula Rud

Population (2006)
  - Total: 34
- Time zone: UTC+3:30 (IRST)
  - Summer (DST): UTC+4:30 (IRDT)

Haymar (Persian: حايمر, also Romanized as Ḩāymar) is a village in Tula Rud Rural District, in the Central District of Talesh County, Gilan Province, Iran. At the 2006 census, its population was 34, in 11 families.
