= Reginald Leonard Haine =

Recipient of the Victoria Cross

Reginald Leonard Haine VC MC
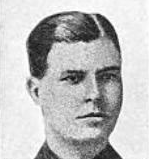
- Born: 10 July 1896; Wandsworth, London, England
- Died: 12 June 1982 (aged 85); Lambeth, London, England
- Military career
- Allegiance: United Kingdom
- Branch: British Army; British Indian Army
- Rank: Lieutenant Colonel
- Units: Honourable Artillery Company
- Conflicts: World War I World War II
- Awards: Victoria Cross; Military Cross
- Other work: Chartered accountant

Lieutenant Colonel Reginald Leonard Haine VC MC (10 July 1896 – 12 June 1982) was a British Army officer and an English recipient of the Victoria Cross, the highest and most prestigious award for gallantry in the face of the enemy that can be awarded to British and Commonwealth forces.

== Early life ==
He was born 1896 in Earlsfield, Wandsworth, the son of Harry James (1864–1933) and Louisa Margaret (1859–1957) Haine; his father was a teacher who later worked for the Metropolitan Police. They moved to Richmond in the early 1900s and in 1911 they lived at 33, Selwyn Avenue. He attended the British School, the Vineyard, before gaining a scholarship to the Richmond County School. In 1914 he passed the exams for the Institute of Chartered Accountants. Before the war he was articled to the chartered accountants Messrs. Derbyshire Brothers. He was a member of the Biddulph (Petersham) Troop of Boy Scouts, where his late brother had been assistant Scout-master, and paraded with them in the 1911 Coronation celebrations.

== First World War service ==
Haine enlisted in the Honourable Artillery Company on 28 August 1914 when he was underage. Haine was 20 years old, and a second lieutenant in the 1st Battalion, Honourable Artillery Company, British Army during the First World War when the following deed took place for which he was awarded the VC.

On 28/29 April 1917 near Gavrelle, France, when British troops were holding a salient which was being repeatedly counter-attacked by German forces, Second Lieutenant Haine organised and led six bombing attacks against a German strong point and captured the position, together with 50 prisoners and two machine-guns. The enemy at once counter-attacked and regained the lost ground, but Second Lieutenant Haine formed a "block" in his trench and for the whole of the following night maintained his position. Next morning he again attacked and recaptured the position. His splendid example inspired his men during more than 30 hours of continuous fighting.

Haine was presented with an illuminated address by the mayor of Richmond.

He can be heard recounting some of his First World War experiences in Peter Jackson's film They Shall Not Grow Old.

Haine was later attached to the 35th Sikhs, Indian Army and was awarded the Military Cross for his actions on the North West Frontier of India at Dakka, 17 May 1919. The citation for the medal reads:

For conspicuous gallantry on 17th May, 1919, at Dakka. On many occasions during the fight near the summit of the hill he did everything in his power to collect the men for an attack on the enemy entrenches on the top in face of very heavy fire. When it was decided to retire and take up a position further down the hill, he collected all the men he could gather, and, before descending, assisted in getting all the wounded away.

He is remembered on the Imperial War Museums' site We remember Reginald Leonard Haine. There is a commemorative plaque in the garden outside Wandsworth Town Hall.

== Subsequent career ==
He later achieved the rank of lieutenant colonel and commanded a Home Guard battalion during the Second World War. In later life he became a chartered accountant.

== Personal life ==
He married Dora B Holder (1898–1997) in 1923 at St Mark’s, Woodcote, Purley. They had a daughter, Janet, and lived in Purley before moving to Eastbourne. In 1939 they lived in Coulsdon where he was Director of a Paint Manufacturer Company. He died at St Thomas' Hospital, Lambeth, on 12 June 1982, with a funeral service held at St Mary's church, Eastbourne; there is a memorial plaque in the garden of remembrance, Chichester Crematorium.

== Medal ==
The medal was loaned by the family to the Imperial War Museum in London. In 2025 it was auctioned. A copy is on display at Headquarters, Honourable Artillery Company, Armoury House, London.
