= Shaun Wallis =

English ice hockey player

- Born: 19 January 1982 (age 44) London, England
- Position: Forward
- Played for: Chelmsford Chieftains; Romford Raiders
- Playing career: 1999–2016

Shaun Wallis (born 19 January 1982 in London, England) is an ice hockey player who currently plays for the Romford Raiders in the English Premier Ice Hockey League.
