= William Wynne-Jones, Baron Wynne-Jones =

William Francis Kenrick Wynne-Jones, Baron Wynne-Jones (8 May 1903 – 8 November 1982) was a British chemist.

== Scientific career. ==
Wynne-Jones began his career as a research assistant and lecturer in physical chemistry at the University of Bristol. He then became an international research fellow at the University of Copenhagen in 1927, where he remained until taking up a post as lecturer in chemistry at the University of Reading in 1929. In 1934, while still at Reading, Wynne-Jones was a Leverhulme Research Fellow at Princeton University.

In 1938 Wynne-Jones became professor of chemistry at University College, Dundee (then a part of the University of St Andrews, but which later became the University of Dundee) and moved to King's College, Newcastle upon Tyne, as professor of physical chemistry in 1947. Wynne-Jones remained at Newcastle as it was accredited as Newcastle University and became head of the school of chemistry in 1956. He became pro vice-chancellor in 1965 and retained both roles until 1968.

== Political career ==
Wynne-Jones was created a life peer on 17 December 1964 with the title Baron Wynne-Jones, of Abergele in the County of Denbigh. He sat as a Labour peer.

== Death ==
Lord Wynne-Jones died in 1982.
