= Kieran Darlow =

English footballer (born 1982)

Personal information
- Full name: Kieran Brian Darlow
- Date of birth: 9 November 1982 (age 43)
- Place of birth: Bedford, England
- Positions: Full back; midfielder; striker

Senior career*
Years	Team	Apps	(Gls)
1999–2002	York City	5	(0)
2002	Frickley Athletic		
- * Club domestic league appearances and goals

Kieran Brian Darlow (born 9 November 1982) is an English former footballer.

Darlow started his career with York City in 1999. He left in 2002 to join Frickley Athletic.
