= John E. Heymer =

British former police officer and author

- Born: 15 January 1934
- Died: 20 May 2011

John Edward Heymer is a British former police officer and author who has written extensively on spontaneous human combustion (SHC).

Heymer was born in Bow, East London, in 1934 and went to South Wales at the age of 16 to become a coal miner. He returned to London two years later for National Service and spent three years in the Royal Fusiliers. He then returned to work as a miner but left after being injured during a roof fall. He joined the Monmouthshire Constabulary and spent a few years as a police constable on patrol, followed by a few years in the photography department at Police Headquarters in Croesyceiliog. He then became a Scenes of Crimes Officer and Crime Prevention Officer.

Heymer describes himself as an autodidact, with a lifelong passion for knowledge, and has written that he is not afraid to pursue this into areas where other people might fear ridicule or contempt.

He was a gradual convert to belief in SHC, mainly as a result of his attendance as scene of crime officer at the apparent death by SHC of an elderly man in Ebbw Vale (Henry Thomas).

Heymer believes that SHC is not a supernatural phenomenon, but a rare natural phenomenon that has not yet been examined sufficiently (mainly due to the difficulty presented by the results of SHC).

He has published articles about SHC in New Scientist and Fortean Times, and has appeared on the BBC television programmes Newsnight and QED ("The Burning Question").

In 1996, he published a book entitled The Entrancing Flame, which was about his personal experience of dealing with the results of SHC and attempted to analyse the phenomenon.
