= Deaths in June 1982 =

The following is a list of notable deaths in June 1982.

Entries for each day are listed alphabetically by surname. A typical entry lists information in the following sequence:

- Name, age, country of citizenship at birth, subsequent country of citizenship (if applicable), reason for notability, cause of death (if known), and reference.

== June 1982 ==
=== 1 ===
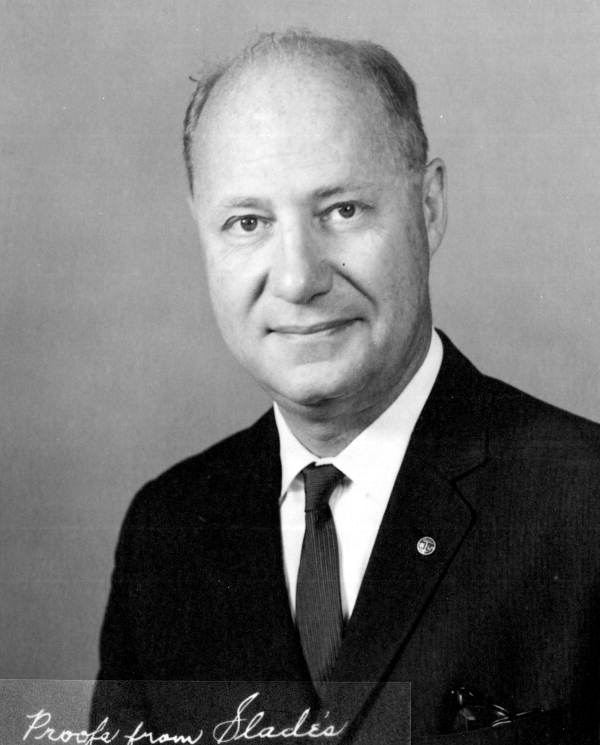
John Bell

- John Bell, 65, American politician from Florida
- Einar Juhl, 86, Danish film actor
- Zdeněk Kudrna, 35, Czech speedway rider
- Tom Reddick, 70, English cricketer
- Per G. Holmgren, 72, Swedish director, screenwriter, composer and lyricist
- Paul Wehner, 85, German sports shooter
- Henryk Worcell, 72, Polish writer and publicist

=== 2 ===
- Jiří Brdečka, 64, Czech screenwriter, film director, animator, cartoonist, and painter, he worked as both a screenwriter and film director at the Barrandov Studios, and he directed animated films for the Bratři v triku studio, one of his short animated films had won the Grand Prix award at the Annecy International Animation Film Festival in 1963
- Fazal Ilahi Chaudhry, 78, Pakistani politician and barrister, he served as the president of Pakistan from 1973 until his resignation in 1978, he was the first ethnic Punjabi president of Pakistan, heart disease
- George E. A. Hallett, 92, English aviator
- Ivan Mikhailichenko, 61, Soviet Air Force officer and pilot
- Tahira Naqvi, 25, Pakistani actress
- Herbert Quandt, 71, German industrialist and member of the Nazi Party
- Willie Smith, 96, English professional player of snooker and English billiards
- Shah Abdul Wahhab, 87-88, Bangladeshi Deobandi Islamic scholar, educator, jurist, preacher, and spiritual leader,during the Bangladesh Liberation War of 1971, he arranged a special langar khana for those in danger, regardless of their religion

=== 3 ===
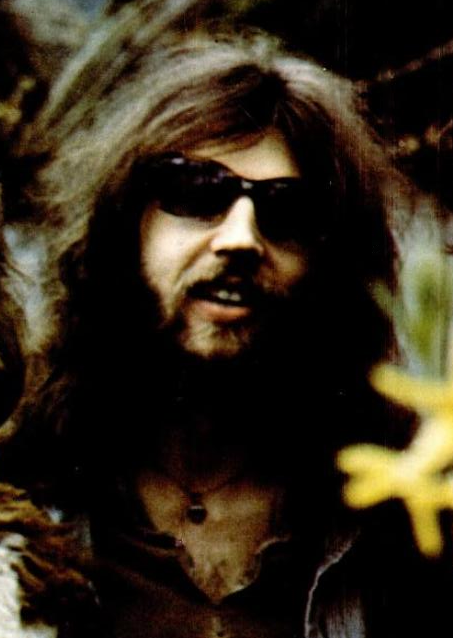
Rusty Day

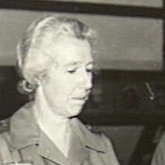
Elizabeth Johns

- Sergey Balasanian, 79, Soviet Armenian composer
- Hermann Boerner, 75, German mathematician
- Peter Carter, 48, British-Canadian film and television director, he was nominated for the Best Director award at the 1st Genie Awards in 1980 for Klondike Fever, heart attack
- Rusty Day, 36, American rock singer
- Ronald Duncan, 67, English writer, poet and playwright
- Robert Gottschalk, 64, American camera technician, inventor, and co-founder of Panavision
- Atta Mohammad Hami, 63, Pakistani poet, writer and scholar
- Joachim Illies, 57, German biologist, entomologist, limnologist and author
- Valery Ilyinykh, 34, Soviet gymnast and Olympic medalist
- Arwed Imiela, 52, German serial killer
- Elizabeth Johns, 87, Australian matron and army nurse
- Gilbert Hackforth-Jones, 82, British British writer
- Robert Lougheed, 72, Canada-born American artist
- Claudio Orrego Vicuña, 42, Chilean social scientist, academic and Christian Democrat politician

=== 4 ===
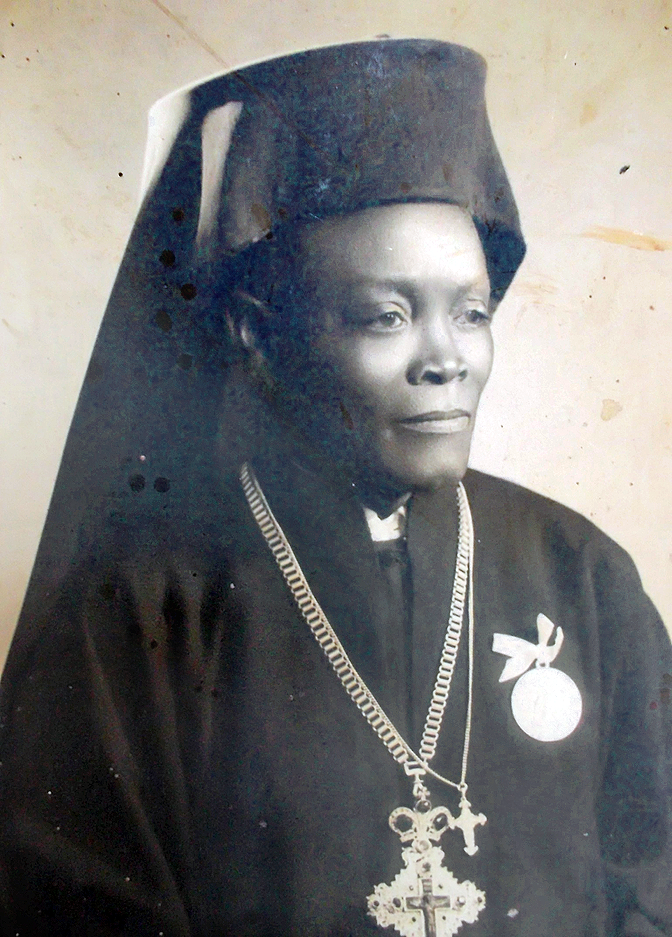
Ruben Spartas Mukasa

- Julius Ashkin, 61, American physicist
- Sandy Buckle, 90, Australian cricketer
- Táňa Hodanová, 89, Czech actress
- Tony Kaufmann, 81, American professional baseball player, coach and manager
- Kumar, 78, Indian film producer and actor
- Gerhard Lindner, 85, German Army general of World War II
- Henning Dahl Mikkelsen, 67, Danish cartoonist, he was the creator of the long-running comic strip Ferd'nand, a prominent example of pantomime comics
- Hermanni Pihlajamäki, 78, Finnish wrestler and Olympian
- Ruben Spartas Mukasa, Bishop of the Greek Orthodox Church of Alexandria
- Viktor Staal, 73, Austrian actor

=== 5 ===
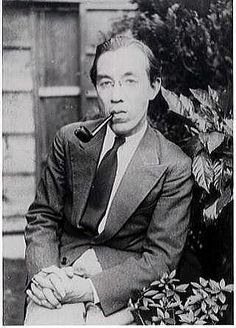
Junzaburō Nishiwaki

- Begum Feroza Bari, 64, Bangladeshi social worker and female leader
- Paul Birch, 72, American basketball player and coach
- Art Giroux, 73, Canadian professional ice hockey right winger
- Olle Hellbom, 56, Swedish film director, producer, and screenwriter
- Junzaburō Nishiwaki, 88, Japanese poet and literary critic
- Bert O'Dee, 85, Australian rules football player
- George Schuster, 101, British barrister, financier, colonial administrator and Liberal politician
- John Söderström, 92, Swedish tennis player
- Pioquinto Soto, 66, Mexican basketball player
- Jorge Torres, 63, Cuban baseball player
- John Vitale, 73, Sicilian-American mobster

=== 6 ===
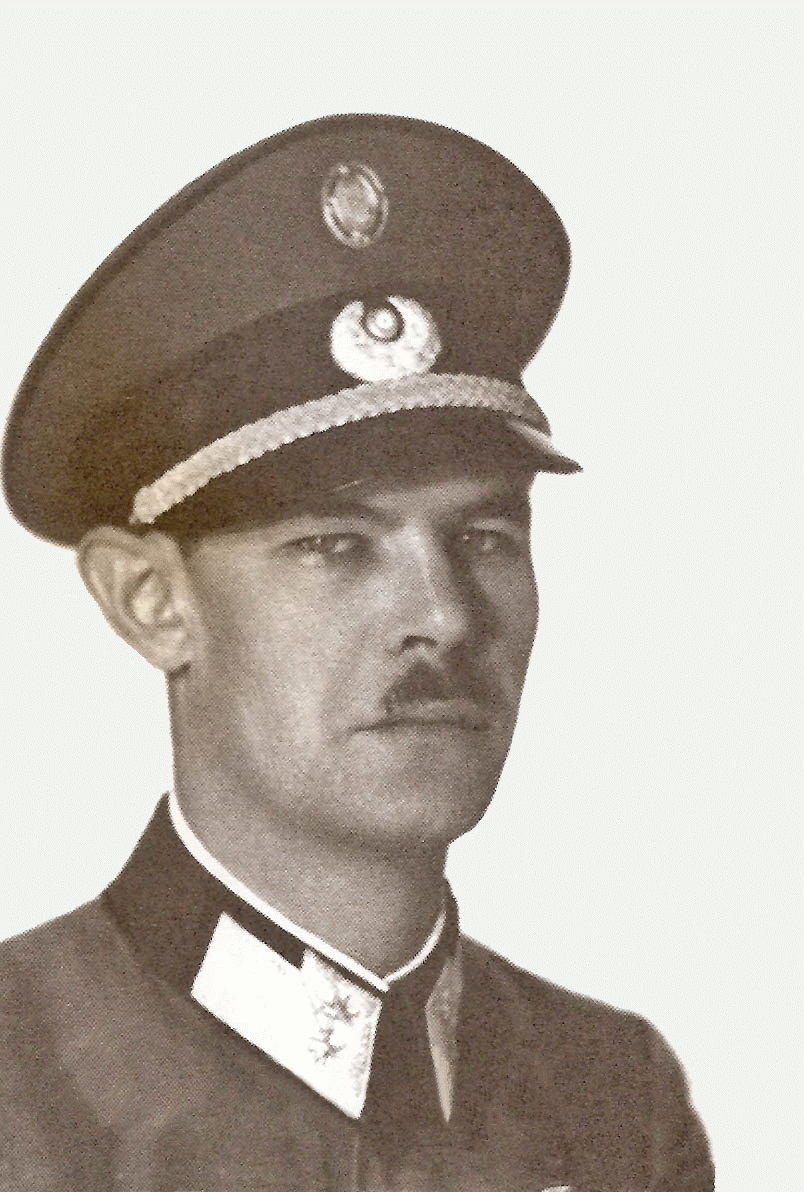
Ivan Babić

- René Arrieu, 58, French actor and comedian
- Ivan Babić, 77, Croatian soldier and lieutenant-colonel in the Croatian Home Guard and later an emigrant dissident writer against Communist Yugoslavia
- Ifor Davies, 71, Welsh Labour politician
- Rolls Gracie, 31, Brazilian martial artist
- Gregorio Hontomin, 72, Filipino Catholic religious brother and organ builder
- Heinrich-Hermann von Hülsen, 86, German general during World War II
- Antti Koskinen (actor), 60, Finnish tenor and actor
- Doug McCaig, 63, Canadian ice hockey player
- David Oliver, 40, American soul and jazz singer
- V. Venkatasubba Reddiar, 72, Chief Minister of Puducherry
- Kenneth Rexroth, 76, American poet, translator, critical essayist, and painter, he was considered an associate member of the poetry group Objectivists in the 1930s, he was regarded as a central figure in the San Francisco Renaissance of the 1950s, and he was also described as a father figure to the Beat Generation, despite his own criticisms of this literary movement
- Gösta Rodin, 80, Swedish screenwriter and film director
- Billy Sarll, 82, Australian rules footballer
- Wolf Szmuness, 63, Polish-born American epidemiologist
- D. Devaraj Urs, 66, Indian politician

=== 7 ===
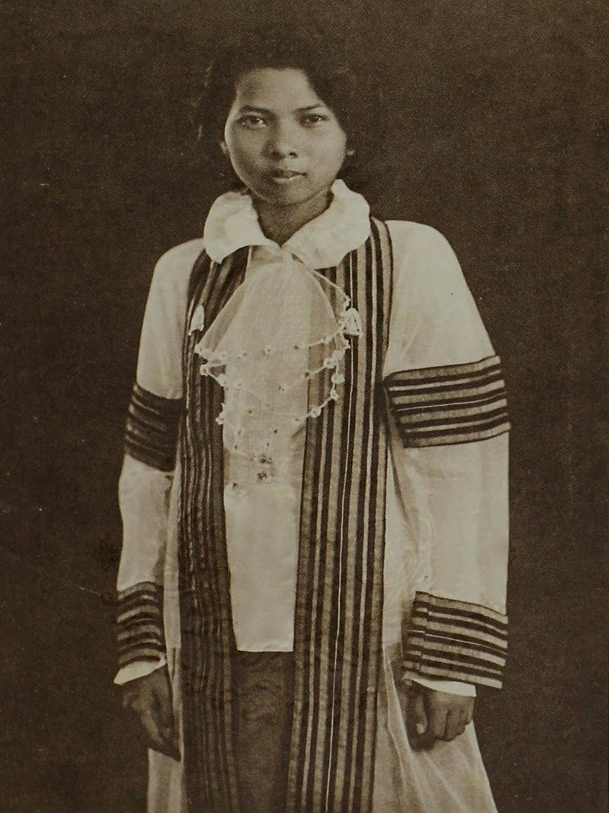
Boonlua Debyasuvarn

- Karl K. Darrow, 90, American physicist and secretary of the American Physical Society from 1941 to 1967
- Boonlua Debyasuvarn, 70, Thai writer, educator and civil servant
- Ferdinand Waldo Demara, 60, American impostor, he was a deserter from the ranks of the United States Army during World War II, and he subsequently had several short-lived careers while using the names and identities of other people, variously serving as a civil engineer, a sheriff's deputy, an assistant prison warden, a doctor of applied psychology, a hospital orderly, a lawyer, a child-care expert, a Benedictine monk, a Trappist monk, and a naval surgeon, heart failure and complications from diabetes
- Lou DiMuro, 51, American umpire in Major League Baseball
- Krishna Kanta Handique, 83, Sanskrit scholar, an Indologist and philanthropist from Assam
- Art Johnson, 85, American pitcher in Major League Baseball
- Raymond Lamy, 80, French film editor
- Adam Powell, 69, English cricketer
- Mary Qayuaryuk, 74, Inuk printmaker and midwife
- Elmer Robinson, 87, 33rd mayor of San Francisco, California
- Ernie Wilson, 81, Australian rules footballer

=== 8 ===
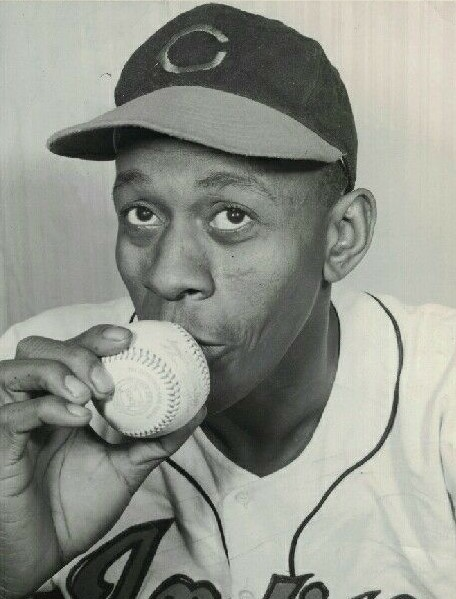
Satchel Paige

- William H. Brown Jr., 64, American television director and producer, a radio dramatist, and a composer
- Irv Jeffries, 76, American infielder in Major League Baseball
- Ivan Mistrík, 46, Slovak actor
- K. Bhaskaran Nair, 68, Malayalam writer, literary critic, essayist, and educationist
- Wallace Neff, 87, American architect
- Satchel Paige, 75, American professional baseball pitcher who played in both Negro league baseball and Major League Baseball (MLB), his professional career lasted from 1926 until 1966, and he retired two weeks prior to his 60th birthday, heart attack during a power failure at his home.
- Floyd W. Pettie, 62, American politician and civil servant from Colorado
- Roger Potter, 74, American professional basketball coach
- Edson Queiroz, 57, Brazilian businessman
- Harriet T. Righter, 104, American businesswoman who served as the president of Selchow and Righter
- Solveig Rönn-Christiansson, 79, Swedish politician and trade unionist
- Jean Wiener, 86, French composer and pianist

=== 9 ===
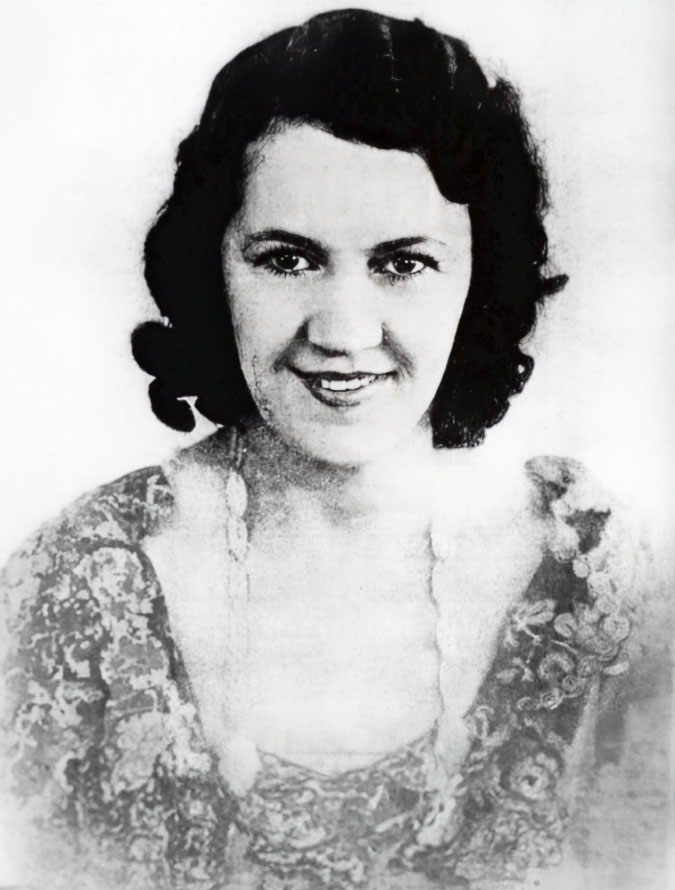
Nellie Bramley

- Mirza Nasir Ahmad, 72, Pakistani religious leader, he served as the third Caliph of the country's Ahmadiyya Muslim Community from 1965 until his death in 1982, he laid the foundation stone of the Basharat Mosque in Pedro Abad, the first mosque to be built in Spain in over 750 years, heart attack, while already receiving medical treatment for unspecified health problems since late May
- Anthony Amaral, 51, historian of the American West and horse trainer
- Richard St. Barbe Baker, 92, English biologist and botanist, environmental activist and author
- Nellie Bramley, 92, Australian stage actress
- Costantino Costantini, 77, Italian architect
- Chittadhar Hridaya, 76, Nepalese poet
- Hank Ladd, 73, American actor and screenwriter, television writer for Jackie Gleason and His American Scene
- Jutta Langenau, 48, German swimmer
- A. Frank Martin, 87, American saxophonist, bandmaster, and educational administrator
- Eddie Richards, 77, English international rugby union player
- Kalle Schröder, 68, Swedish tennis player
- Liudmila Terentʹeva, 71 or 72, Soviet ethnographer and sociologist

=== 10 ===
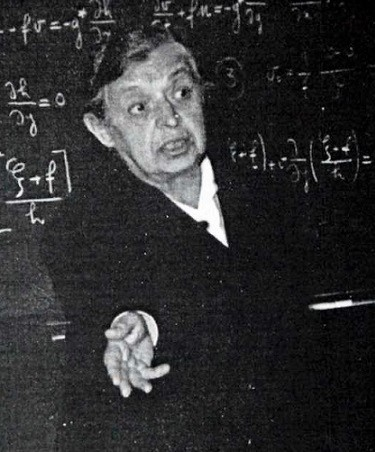
Giuseppina Aliverti

- Yekutiel Adam, 54, Israeli general and former Deputy Chief of Staff of the Israel Defense Forces
- Giuseppina Aliverti, 87, Italian geophysicist
- Geo Barton, 70, Romanian actor
- Margaret Bastock, 62, English zoologist and geneticist
- Daisy Burrell, 89, British actress
- Frank Cahill, 60, Australian rules footballer
- Gala Dalí, 87, Russian schoolteacher and art model, mainly associated with the Surrealist movement and its artists, wife and muse for both Paul Éluard and Salvador Dalí, she is also credited for providing inspiration to Louis Aragon, Max Ernst, and André Breton, death attributed to a severe case of influenza, but she was also suffering from dementia during the last months of her life
- Rainer Werner Fassbinder, 37, German filmmaker, dramatist and actor, one of the major figures of the New German Cinema movement, death from drug overdose, due to a combination of cocaine and barbiturates
- Gavin Hamilton, 29, British Army officer
- Addie Harris, member of The Shirelles
- Bernard Heinze, 87, Australian conductor, academic, and director of the New South Wales State Conservatorium of Music
- Faye Cashatt Lewis, 86, American author, physician, and first woman to graduate from Washington University School of Medicine in St. Louis
- Arthur J. Lohwater, 59, American mathematician
- Bauyrzhan Momyshuly, 71, Kazakh-Soviet military officer and author
- Erich Welter, 81, German economist

=== 11 ===
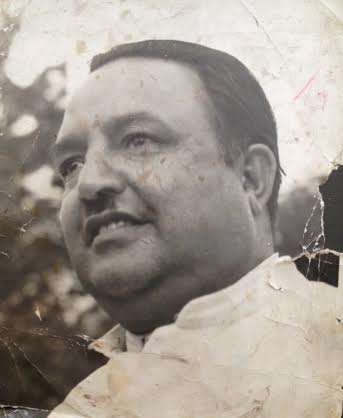
Mirza Afzal Beg

- Mirza Afzal Beg, 53, Kashmiri politician
- Jack Hallett, 67, American professional baseball pitcher
- Santosh Kumar, 56, Pakistani actor, he repeatedly won the Nigar Award for Best Actor (in 1957, 1962, and 1963)
- Don Phelps, 58, American professional football halfback and defensive back
- Alan Righton, 77, Australian rugby league footballer
- Al Rinker, 74, Skitswish musician
- H. Radclyffe Roberts, 76, American entomologist and amateur ornithologist, he served as a member of several bird-collecting expeditions for the Academy of Natural Sciences of Philadelphia during the late 1920s and the early 1930s, his professional work focused on the taxonomy and morphology of the grasshoppers, he also produced and published research on the malaria-transmitting mosquitos for the U.S. War Department during his military service in World War II
- Lidiya Shtykan, 59, Soviet theater and film actress
- Anatoly Solonitsyn, 47, Soviet actor., he won the Silver Bear for Best Actor at the 31st Berlin International Film Festival for his role in Twenty Six Days from the Life of Dostoyevsky (1981), lung cancer. Death reputedly caused by Solonitsyn's exposure to toxic chemicals during the filming of Stalker. The film was shot near Tallinn, with the polluted waters of the small river Jägala used as a setting for certain scenes. The waters contained poisonous liquids from a nearby chemical plant, and many women in the film crew had allergic reactions. Several members of the cast and crew subsequently died due to cancer of the right bronchial tube.

=== 12 ===
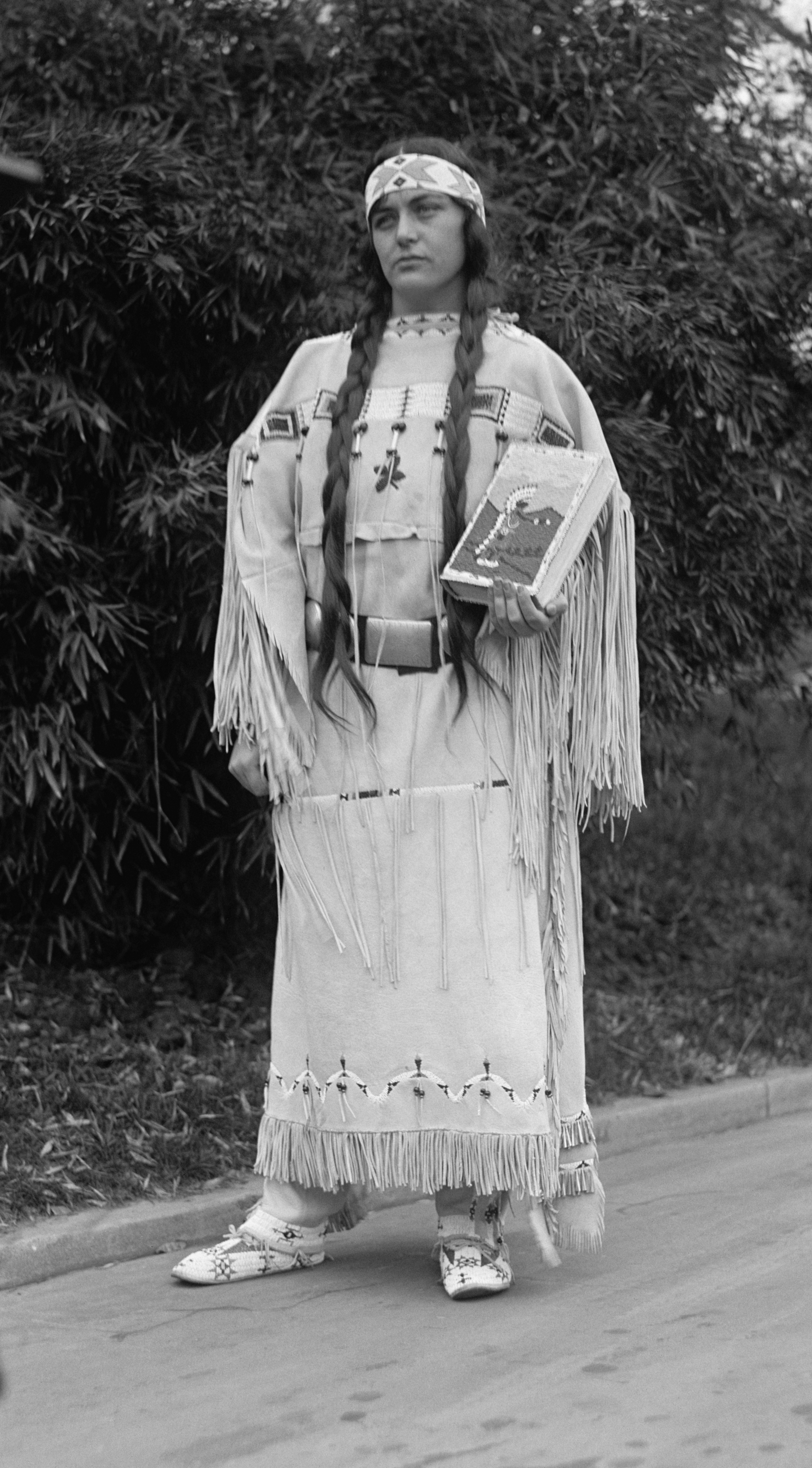
Ruth Muskrat Bronson

- Frank D. Barlow, 90, Mississippi state senator
- Marcus Bosley, 84, Australian cricketer
- Ruth Muskrat Bronson, 84, Cherokee Nation poet, educator and Indian rights activist
- Otto Brunner, 84, Austrian historian
- Karl von Frisch, 95, German-Austrian ethologist, his work focused on investigating the sensory perceptions of the honey bee, he was one of the first scientists to translate the meaning of the waggle dance, publishing his research findings in 1927
- Reginald Leonard Haine, 85, British Army officer and an English recipient of the Victoria Cross
- Takeo Imai, 84, Japanese Major General of the China Expeditionary Army
- Webster McDonald, 82, American baseball pitcher
- Ian McKay, 29, British Army soldier and a posthumous recipient of the Victoria Cross
- Alexander Pirnie, 79, American politician
- Marie Rambert, 94, Polish-born English dancer and pedagogue, an influential figure in British ballet, she served with the Ballets Russes from 1912 until 1913,
- Vitthal Prasad Sharma, 61, Indian politician
- Hugh Stollmeyer, 70, artist from Trinidad and Tobago

=== 13 ===
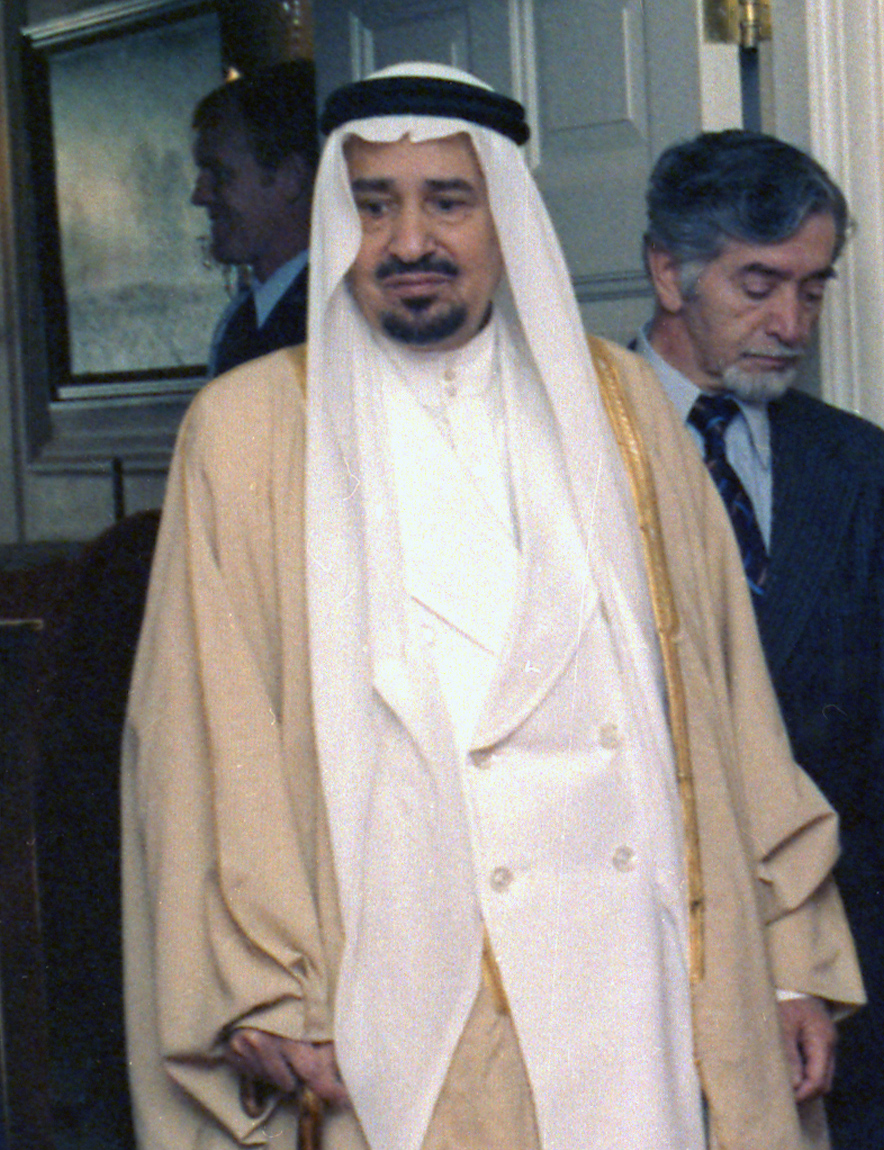
Khalid of Saudi Arabia

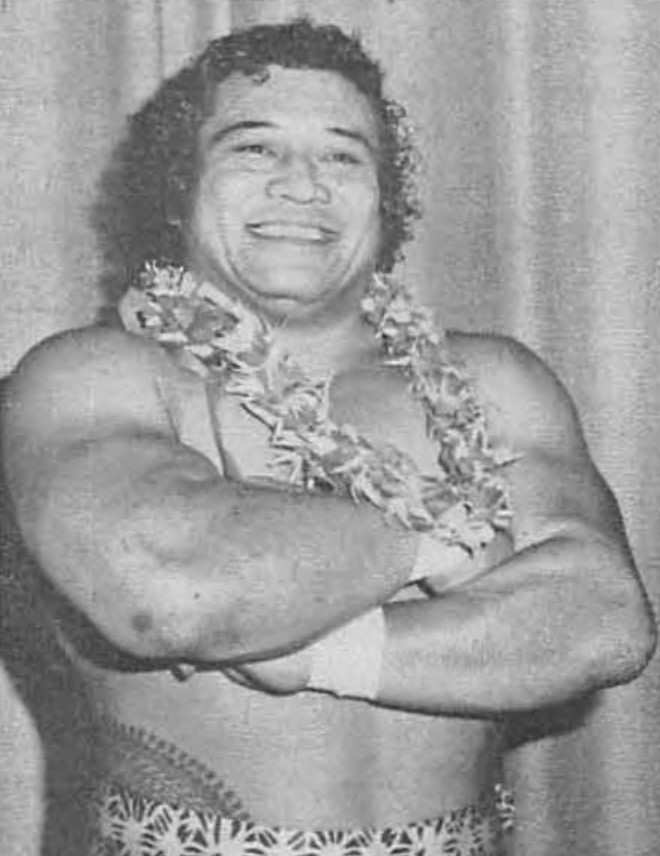
Peter Maivia

- Patrick Fitzsimons, Irish politician
- Marvin Griffin, 74, American politician from the U.S. state of Georgia
- Khalid of Saudi Arabia, 66, he served as both the King of Saudi Arabia and the Prime Minister of Saudi Arabia from 1975 until his death in 1982, rising to power following the assassination of his predecessor Faisal, Khalid had previously served as the first deputy prime minister from 1962 until 1975, and as a frequent member of diplomatic missions from 1934 until 1943, heart attack
- Randy Bobb, 34, American right-handed catcher in Major League Baseball for the Chicago Cubs
- Jack P. King, 73, American politician who served in the Hawaii House of Representatives
- John A. Lee, 90, New Zealand politician and writer
- Ken Mackay, 56, Australian cricketer
- Aloísio Magalhães, 54, Brazilian graphic designer
- Peter Maivia, 45, Samoan-American professional wrestler, actor, and stunt coordinator, he won the New Zealand Heavyweight Championship in 1964, he served as the NWA Australasian Heavyweight Champion from 1964 until 1968, he was one of biggest stars of the company World Wide Wrestling Federation (WWWF) from 1977 until his departure in 1981, death from inoperable cancer, he had been diagnosed with the disease in 1981. The Disney animated character Maui was posthumously designed to resemble Maivia
- Ted McHugh, 65, Australian rugby league player
- Jim Montgomery, 67, American professional basketball player
- Riccardo Paletti, 23, Italian motor racing driver, killed while competing in the 1982 Canadian Grand Prix. During the race, the driver of the Ferrari who had the pole position stalled its engine and lifted his hand to signal that there was a problem. The other cars swerved across the track, trying to squeeze past the stationary car. Paletti could not react in time, and he slammed into the rear of the stranded Ferrari at high speed. He sustained heavy chest injuries and was lying unconscious in his car, wedged against the steering wheel. The petrol from the fuel tank soon ignited, enveloping the car in a wall of fire. While Paletti supposedly died in a hospital shortly after the accident, the track doctor reported that Paletti was already brain dead by the time the medical personnel arrived
- Max Rafferty, 65, American writer, educator, and politician
- Yosef Shenberger, 69 or 70, Israeli architect

=== 14 ===
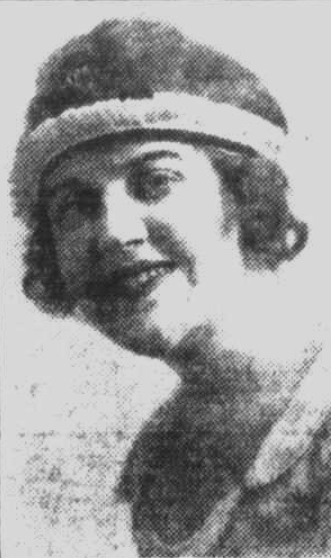
Marjorie Bennett

- Thomas Barrow, 65, Canadian politician
- Marjorie Bennett, 86, Australian actress
- Red Evans, 75, American professional baseball pitcher
- Mary C. Lobban, British physiologist who studied circadian rhythms
- Bill Pavey, 68, Australian rules footballer
- Maurice Pivar, 87, English-born American film editor, producer and writer.
- Earle Parkhill Scarlett, 85, Canadian physician
- Bob Trainer, 54, Australian rules footballer

=== 15 ===
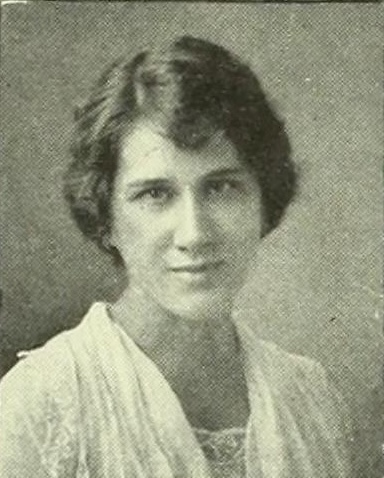
Lucile Marsh Murray

- Johnny Callanan, 72, Irish Fianna Fáil politician from County Galway
- Charles Cholmondeley, 75, British intelligence officer
- Neil Fitzgerald, 89, Irish actor
- Erling Foss, 85, Danish civil engineer and politician
- Yasuo Hisamatsu, 63, Japanese actor, voice actor, television executive, and educator
- Gottfried Kolditz, 59, German actor and director
- Lena Michaëlis, 76, Dutch discus thrower and Olympian
- Lucile Marsh Murray, 82, American dancer, writer, and businesswoman
- Thelma Peake, 68, Australian track and field athlete
- Art Pepper, 56, American jazz musician, active in West Coast jazz, he was reputedly the greatest alto saxophonist of his era, and he also played the tenor saxophone, the clarinet, and the bass clarinet, stroke
- Teddy Pilley, 73, linguist
- Michael Romberg, 64, Russian-born Czechoslovak painter, illustrator, graphic artist, typographer, set designer, costume designer, and educator
- Hermann Schlichting, 74, German engineer, specializing in fluid dynamics
- Jusuf Wibisono, 73, Indonesian politician and economist

=== 16 ===
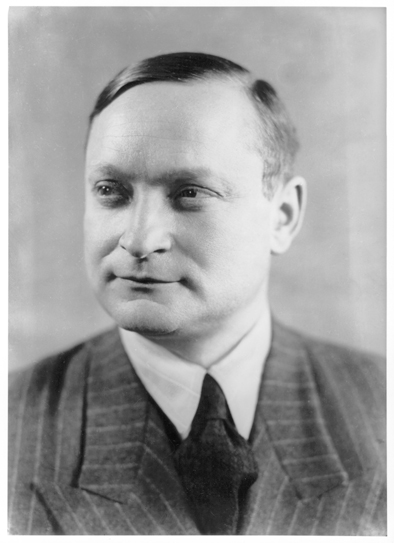
Georg Leibbrandt

- James Honeyman-Scott, 25, English rock guitarist and songwriter, founding member of the band the Pretenders and an influential figure in the new wave movement, heart failure caused by cocaine intolerance
- Robert Kibbee, 60, American university administrator who was Chancellor of the City University of New York
- Georg Leibbrandt, 82, German Nazi Party official and civil servant
- Charlie Lilley, 89, Australian rules footballer
- Isaac Michaelson, Israeli ophthalmologist
- Margaret Thomson, 79, Scottish physician, prisoner of war and war hero.
- Gwen Wakeling, 81, American costume designer and winner of the Academy Award for Best Costume Design
- Alfred G. Wheeler, 83, American college football and college basketball player and coach

=== 17 ===
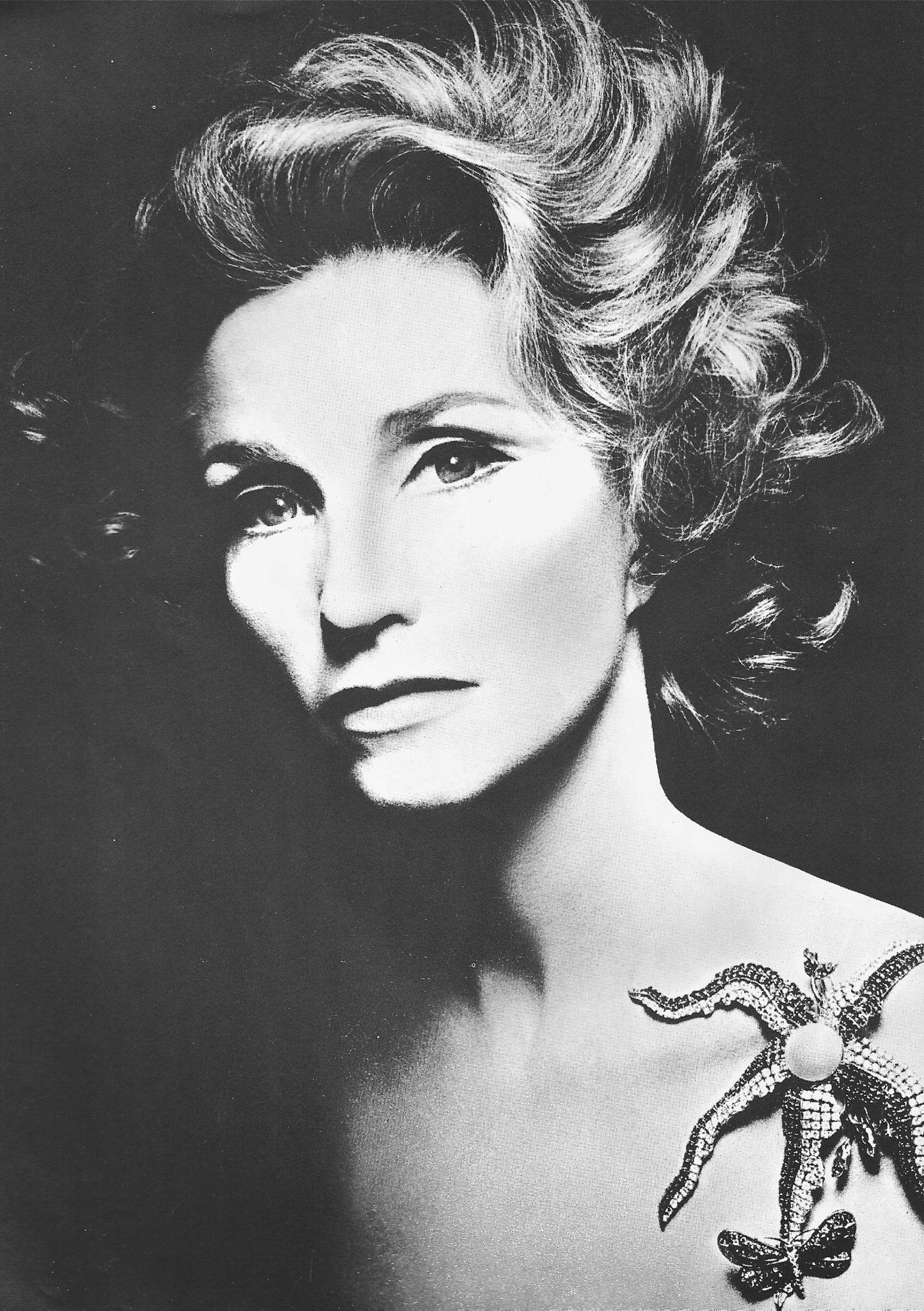
Rebekah Harkness

- Peter William Bartholome, 89, American prelate of the Roman Catholic Church
- Roberto Calvi, 62, Italian banker, chairman of the Banco Ambrosiano, his bank collapsed in June 1982 following the discovery of debts estimated to an amount between US$700 million and 1.5 billion, Following two decades of contradictory official reports on the manner of his death, a forensic report in 2002 established that Calvi had been murdered
- Francisco Adolfo Castillo, 55, Salvadoran military officer
- Ted Collinson, 75, Australian rules footballer
- Helene Ollendorff Curth, 83, German-American dermatologist
- Renzo Grandi, 48, Italian weightlifter
- Rebekah Harkness, 67, American composer, sculptor, dance patron, and philanthropist, eponymous founder of the Harkness Ballet, she sponsored the construction of a medical research building at the New York Hospital, and she supported a number of medical research projects, stomach cancer
- Walter James, 4th Baron Northbourne, 86, English agriculturalist, peer, author, and rower who competed in the 1920 Summer Olympics
- Charles K. Krieger, 68, politician from New Jersey
- Mynie Sutton, 78, Canadian alto saxophonist and bandleader

=== 18 ===
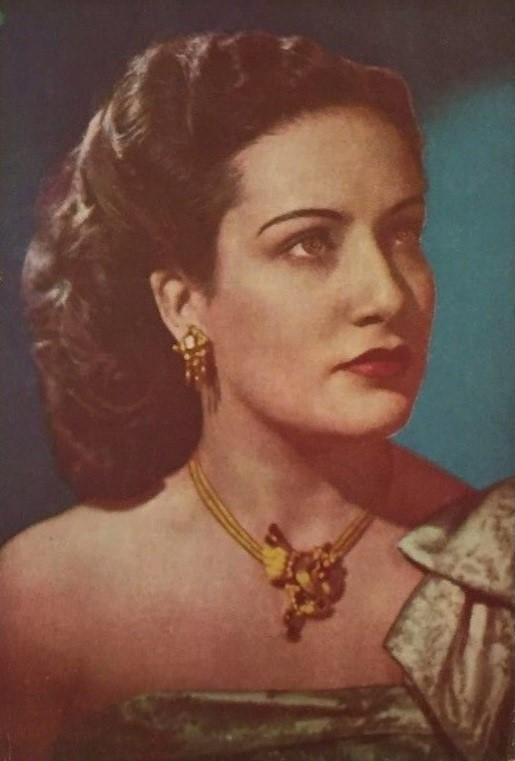
Chela Campos

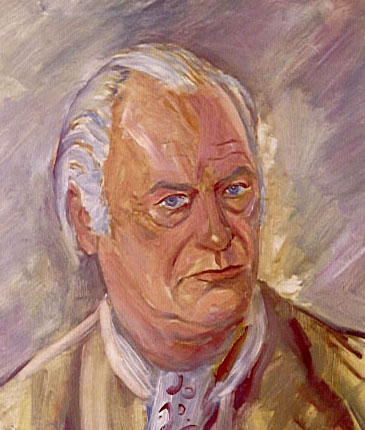
Curd Jürgens

- Nelson Afonso, 48, Indian singer, composer, playwright, and theatre director
- Keith Aickin, 66, Australian judge who served on the High Court of Australia
- Djuna Barnes, 90, American novelist, short story writer, playwright, and illustrator, she is primarily remembered for her novel Nightwood (1936), a prominent example of lesbian literature and metafiction, she was reputedly the last surviving member of the first generation of English-language modernists
- Otto Binge, 87, SS-Standartenführer during World War II and a commander of the SS Division Götz von Berlichingen
- Chela Campos, 59, Mexican singer and actress
- John Cheever, 70, American novelist and short story writer, his post-World War II fiction was noted for Kafkaesque tales and protests against the "slice of life" fiction which dominated The New Yorker during this era, his short story compilation The Stories of John Cheever won the 1979 Pulitzer Prize for Fiction and a National Book Critics Circle Award, lung cancer
- Werner Freese, 50, German actor, director, lecturer and theater director
- Ebba Havez, 82, Swedish-born American writer and actress
- Granville Hicks, 80, American Marxist and later anti-Marxist novelist, literary critic, educator, and editor
- Roscoe H. Hillenkoetter, 85, director of the Central Intelligence Agency
- Bill Hutchison, 59, Australian rules footballer
- Curd Jürgens, 66, German-Austrian actor, (The Devil's General,, Fall of Eagles, and The Spy Who Loved Me)
- Denise Lester, 73, British educator active in Portugal
- Bohumír Lomský, 68, Czech politician
- Hilda Roberts, 81, Irish portrait artist
- Ernie Wheeler, 67, American football defensive back and tailback

=== 19 ===
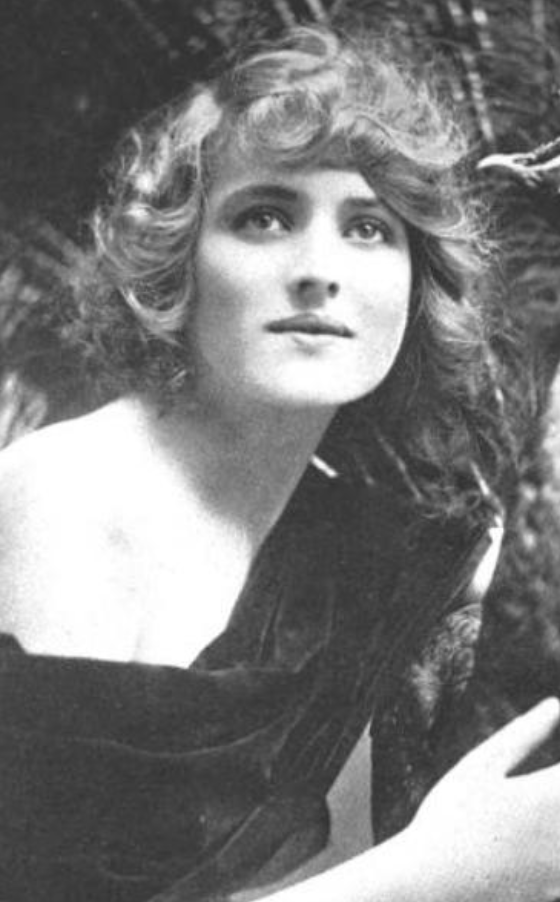
Joan Clarkson

- Jeremy Anderson, 60, American artist and educator, known for his wood sculptures
- Veronica Grace Boland, 83, American politician from Pennsylvania
- Samuel Burris, 62, American baseball pitcher
- Joan Clarkson, 78, English actress
- Nalini Das, 72, Bangladeshi revolutionary
- Dave Dick, 81, Australian rules footballer
- Dutch Harrison, 72, American professional golfer
- Richard Lockridge, 67, American writer
- Escott Loney, 78, English cricketer
- Panteleymon Krymov, 63, Soviet Russian theater and film actor
- Aguedo Mojica, 74, Puerto Rican politician, lawyer and educator
- Allan Sullivan, 49, Canadian politician
- Lidia Zamkow, 63, Polish theatre actress and director

=== 20 ===
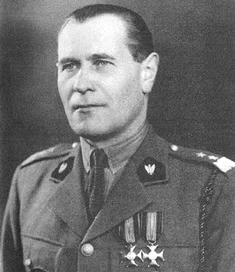
Zygmunt Bohusz-Szyszko

- Cora G. Burwell, 98, American astronomical researcher
- Oscar Castelo, 79, Filipino judge of the Manila Court and Secretary of National Defense of the Philippines
- Uglješa Kojadinović, 46, Yugoslav actor of Serb origin
- Abraham Kornzweig, 81, American physician and ophthalmologist
- Elena Korovina, 64, Russian actress
- Ishbel Peterkin, 79, member of the London County Council and daughter of Prime Minister of the United Kingdom, Ramsay MacDonald
- Ralph Moody, 83, American novelist and autobiographer, better known for the story of his own childhood which he narrated in Little Britches (1950)
- John Olson, 90, American farmer and Democratic politician from Barron County, Wisconsin
- Milton Raison, 78, American screenwriter
- Alvin Williams Stokes, 78, New Jersey investigator on the staff of the House Un-American Activities Committee
- Zygmunt Bohusz-Szyszko, 89, Polish general during World War I and World War II

=== 21 ===
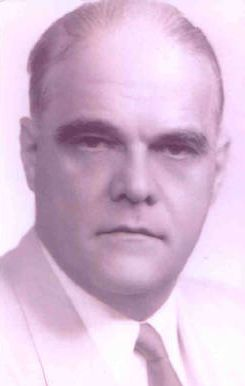
Jorge García Montes

- Hendrik Wade Bode, 76, American engineer, researcher, inventor, author and scientist
- Frank Eugene Hook, 89, American politician from Michigan
- Norman Rowlstone Jarrett, 93, British colonial administrator in Malaya
- Jorge García Montes, 85, Cuban lawyer and politician
- G. Arnold Pfaffenbach, 77, American politician and lawyer from Maryland
- Chrystabel Procter, 88, English gardener, educationalist and horticulturalist
- Dora Riedel, 76, Chilean architect
- Cotton Warburton, 70, American college football quarterback and film editor with about sixty feature film credits, he primarily worked for Metro-Goldwyn-Mayer and the Walt Disney Studios, he won the Academy Award for Best Film Editing for Mary Poppins (1964)

=== 22 ===
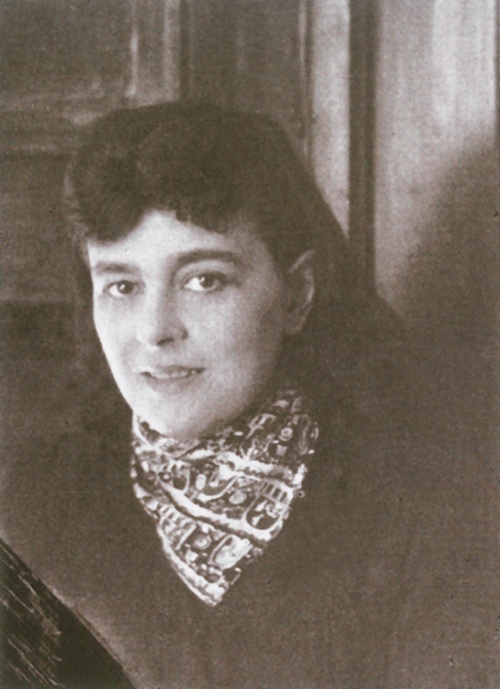
Alexandra von Wolff-Stomersee

- Charles A. Baumhauer, 92, American politician who was elected seven times as the mayor of Mobile, Alabama
- Rafael Fortún, 62, Cuban male sprinter and Olympian
- Gebhard Ludwig Himmler, 83, German Nazi functionary, politician, and mechanical engineer
- John McLeay Sr., 88, Australian politician
- John Wager, 77, American football play in the NFL
- Alan Webb, 75, English actor, he played Mole in the world premiere of the play Toad of Toad Hall (1929) by A. A. Milne, he was originally cast as Palpatine in Return of the Jedi (1983), but he bowed out due to illness, death at his own home due to unspecified health problems
- Alexandra von Wolff-Stomersee, 87, Italian and Baltic German psychoanalyst

=== 23 ===
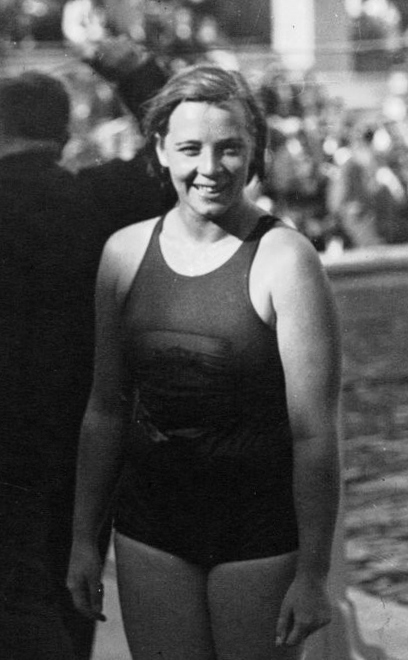
Marie Braun

- Marie Braun, 71, Dutch swimmer
- Arthur Coles, 89, Australian businessman and philanthropist
- Victor Pellier, 81, French racing cyclist
- Anne Wignall, 70, English socialite and writer

=== 24 ===
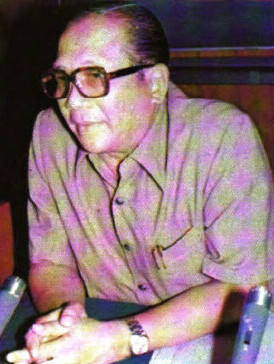
Abdulrachman Setjowibowo

- Alton Desnoyer, 77, American politician
- León María Guerrero, 67, Filipino diplomat and novelist
- William Dean Howe, 66, Canadian politician and physician
- Vic Huxley, 75, Australian speedway rider
- Shneur Kotler, 63, Ashkenazi Orthodox rabbi
- Nan Mackinnon, 79, Scottish traditional singer and storyteller
- B. S. Perera, 58, Sri Lankan actor, director, and singer
- Duša Počkaj, 57, Slovenian film and theatre actress
- Marcelle Pradot, 80, French actress of the silent film era, she worked with the film director Marcel L'Herbier throughout her film career, and she eventually married him in 1923
- Nikita Salogor, 80, Moldavian and Soviet politician
- Abdulrachman Setjowibowo, 65, Indonesian police officer, politician, bureaucrat, and diplomat
- Hope Stevens, 77, American lawyer, political and civic activist, and businessman.
- Charlie Street, 72, Australian rules footballer
- Clara Tambour, 91, French actress

=== 25 ===
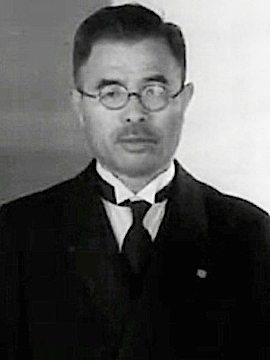
Kazuo Aoki

- Kazuo Aoki, 92, Japanese politician
- Daisy Curwen, 92, British swimmer and Olympian
- Anatoli Golovnya, 82, Soviet cinematographer
- Igor Gouzenko, 63, Soviet intelligence officer who defected to Canada and was a key figure in the "Gouzenko Affair"
- Ed Hamm, 76, American athlete and businessperson, he won the gold medal in the long jump at the 1928 Summer Olympics, business executive of The Coca-Cola Company, representing the company on the West Coast and in Alaska
- Frank O'Driscoll Hunter, 87, American World War I flying ace
- Pentti Irjala, 70, Finnish actor
- Jim Leckie, 78, New Zealand track and field athlete
- Tito Lusiardo, 85, Spanish-born Argentine tango singer and actor
- Harold Orlob, 99, American composer, lyricist, and film producer
- Alex Welsh, 52, Scottish jazz musician

=== 26 ===
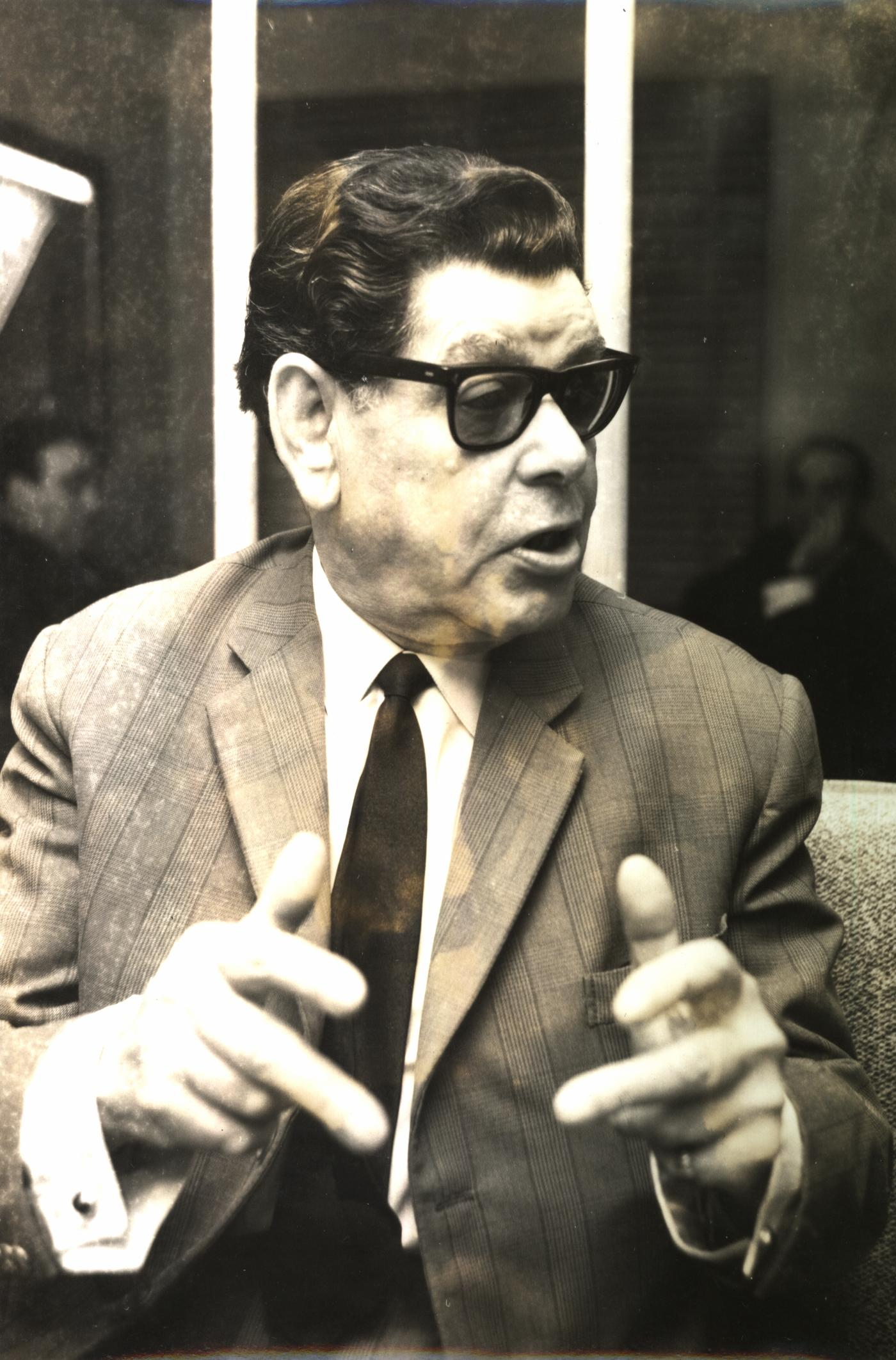
Alfredo Marceneiro

- Saulo Benavente, 66, Argentine painter and set designer
- Geoffrey Bourne, Baron Bourne, 79, British Army officer
- Charles Courant, 86, Swiss freestyle wrestler and Olympic medalist
- Chaim Grade, 72, Yiddish writer
- James Hubbard, 5th Baron Addington, 51, British peer and member of the House of Lords
- Kingsley Kennerley, 68, English billiards and snooker player
- Alfredo Marceneiro, 91, Portuguese fado singer
- Claire Mersereau, 87, American stage and film actress
- Alexander Mitscherlich, 73, German psychiatrist and psychoanalyst
- John Potucek, 80, American politician from Kansas
- Sandy Powell, 82, English comedian
- Gherasim Rudi, 75, Moldavian SSR politician
- Charles Russhon, 71, American photographer and military officer
- Rex Whitlock, 71, British racewalker

=== 27 ===
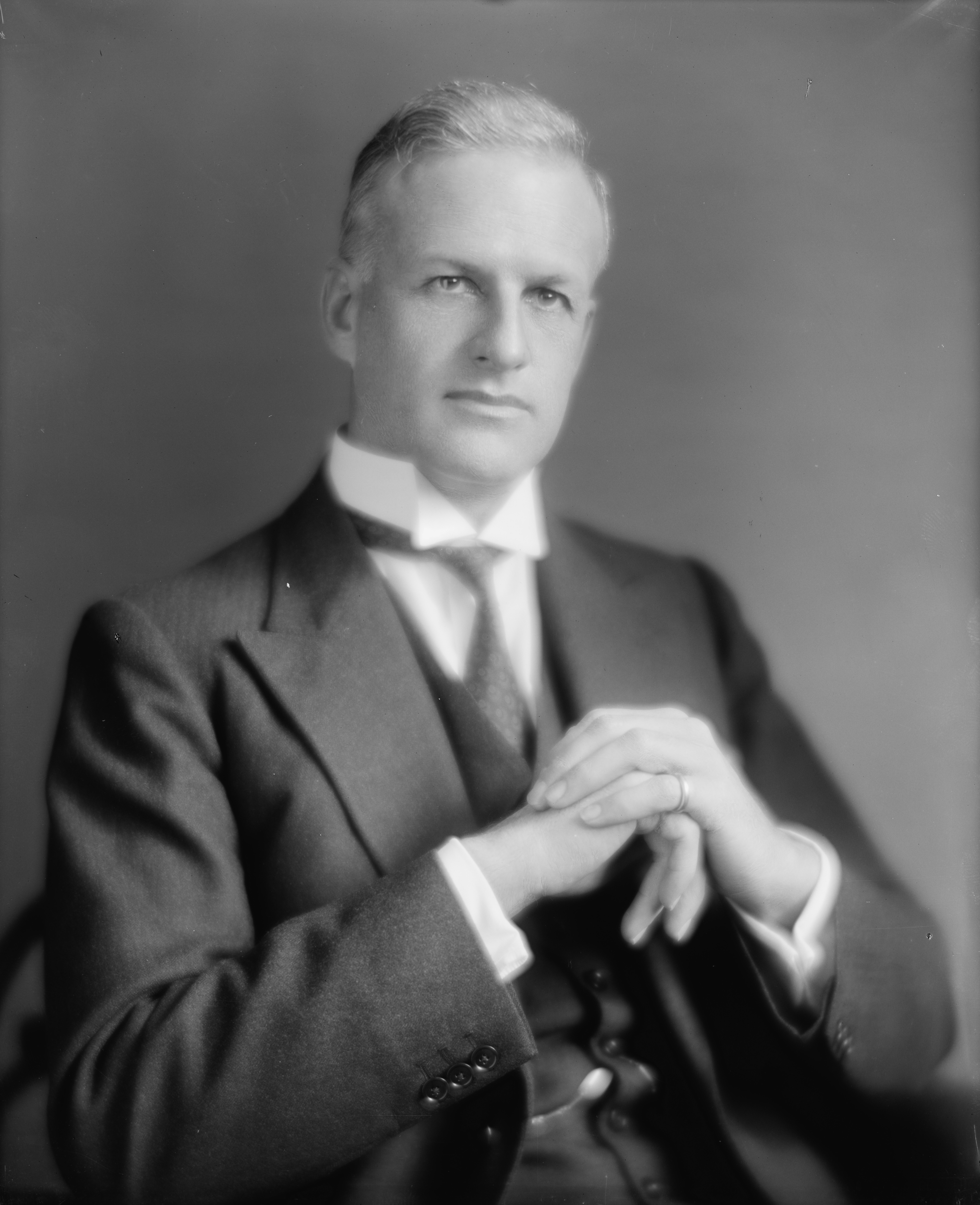
John K. Caldwell

- Roger Abel, 82, Monegasque sports shooter and Olympian
- John K. Caldwell, 100, American diplomat
- Chet Kozel, 62, American football lineman
- Eddie Morgan, 67, American Major League Baseball player
- Jack Mullaney, 52, American actor, he was a regular cast member in the sitcoms The Ann Sothern Show,Ensign O'Toole, and It's About Time, stroke
- Robert N. Mullin, 88, American historian
- Dmitry Zherebin, 76, Soviet colonel general

=== 28 ===
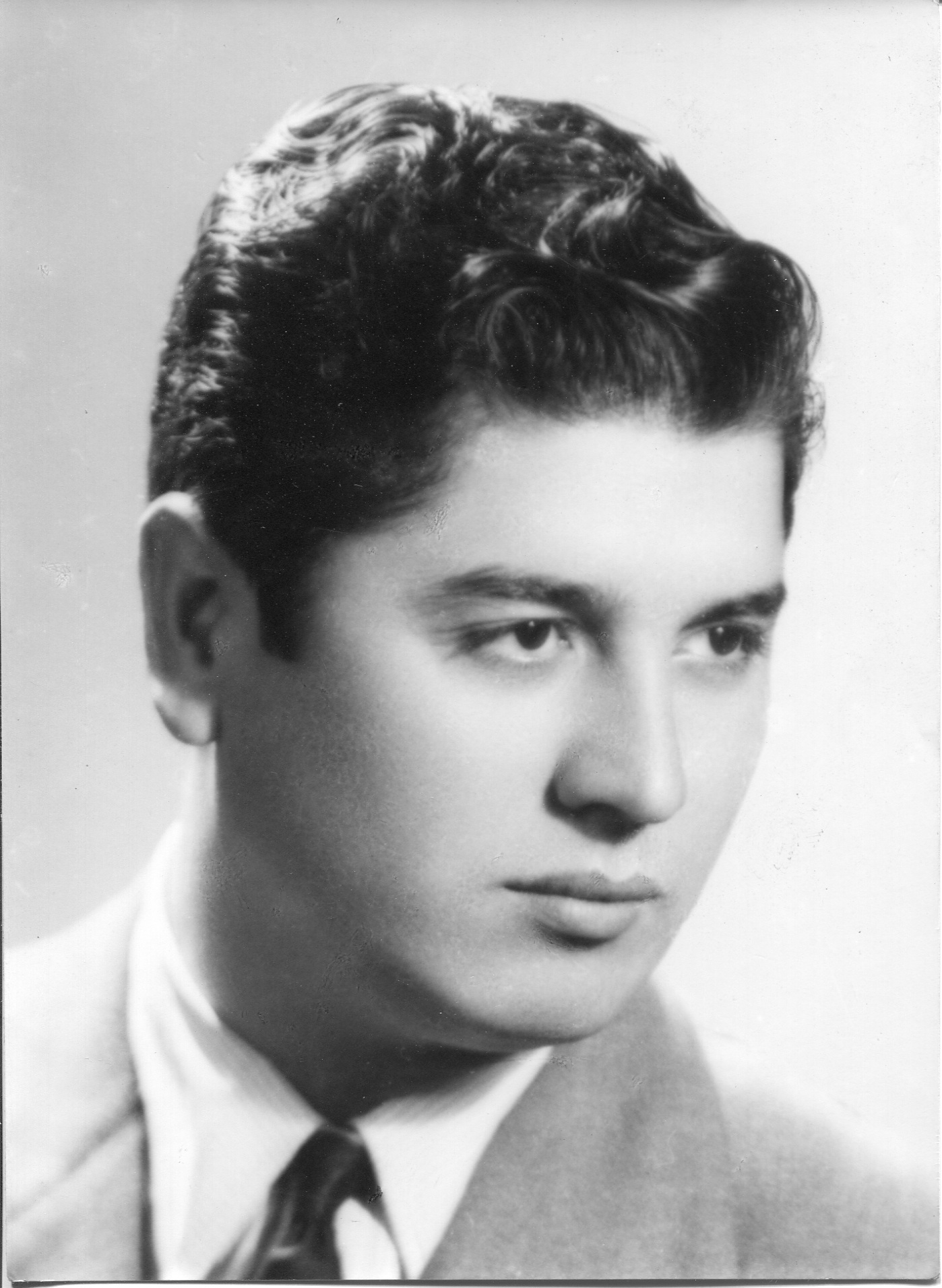
Raúl Berón

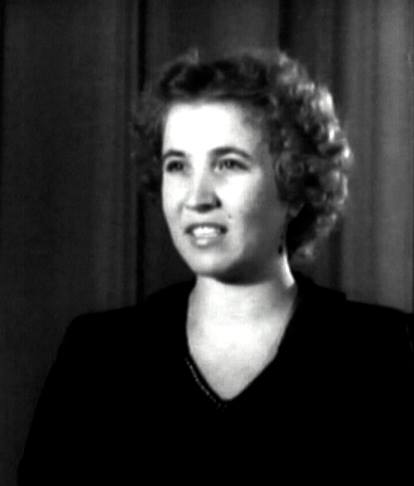
Novela Serpionova

- Raúl Berón, 62, Argentine tango singer
- Russ Blinco, 76, Canadian professional ice hockey centre
- Seweryna Broniszówna, 90, Polish theater and film actress of Jewish origin
- Woldemar Gerschler, 78, German athletics coach
- Kosta Hlavaty, 68, Czech director and screenwriter
- Marius Madsen, Danish trade union leader
- George Matthews, 69, American jazz trombonist
- Timothy Blair McLean, 71, 21st Surgeon General of Canada.
- Albert J. Merkovsky, 65, American football player
- Harry Mills, 57, American jazz and pop vocalist who was a member of The Mills Brothers
- Adolf Portmann, 85, Swiss zoologist
- Eric Robinson, 90, South African veterinarian
- Gerard Rutten, 79, Dutch film director
- Novela Serpionova, Ukrainian radio announcer who became the very first television presenter in the history of television in Ukraine.
- Harold E. Tanner, 89, Canadian politician, soldier, and educator
- Dick Wise, 72, motorcycle speedway rider from Australia

=== 29 ===
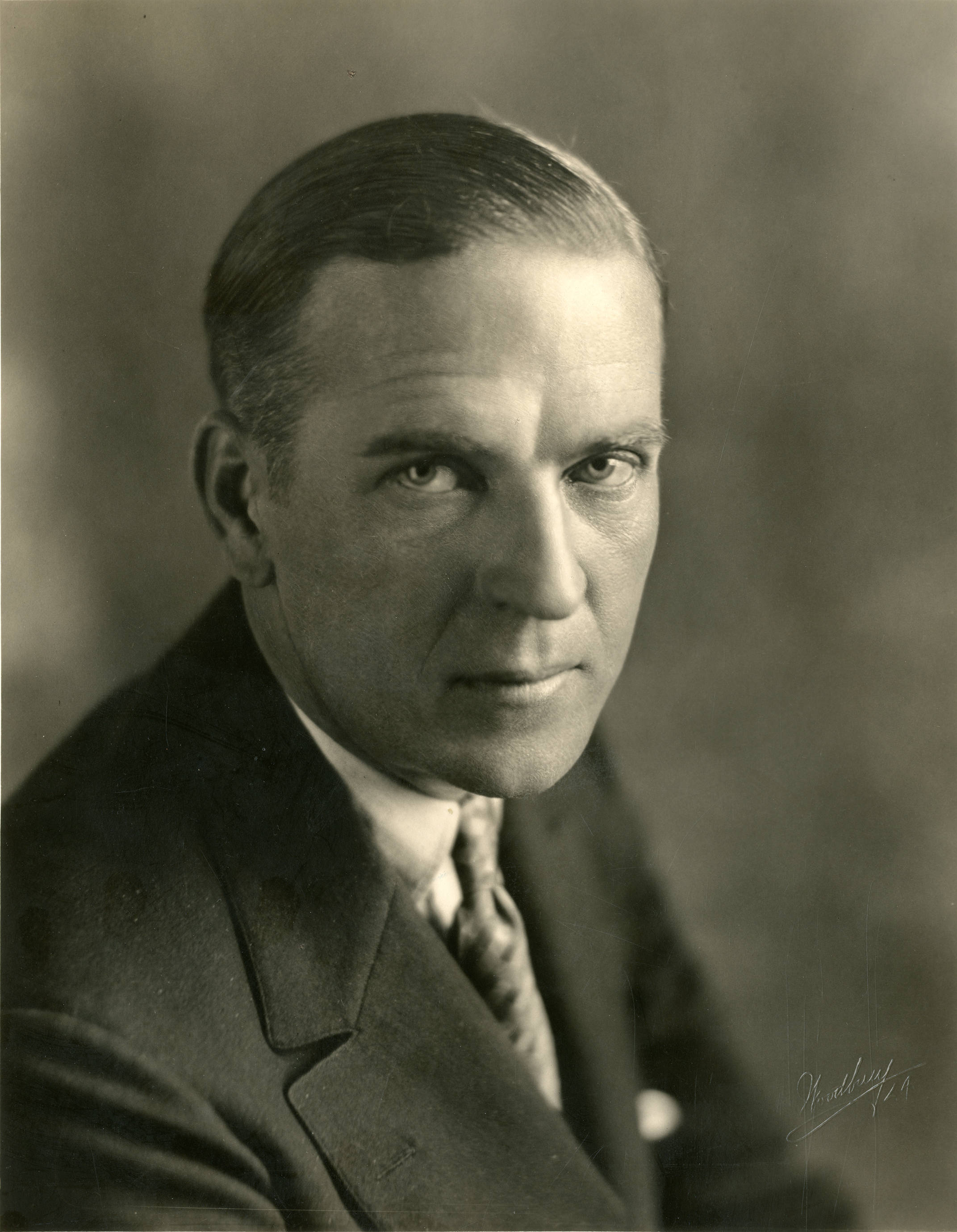
Henry King

- Jack Anderson, 73, Australian rules footballer
- Pierre Balmain, 68, French fashion designer, founder of Balmain, liver cancer
- Michael Brennan, 69, English film and television actor
- Floria Capsali, 82, Romanian ballerina, choreographer and dance teacher
- Benjamin Castleman, 76, American physician and pathologist
- Gerardo Conforti, 79, Italian equestrian and Olympian
- Martin Gregor, 75, Slovak actor
- Henry King, 96, American film director and actor, he is regarded as one of the most commercially successful Hollywood directors of the interwar period, he primarily worked for the film studio 20th Century Fox since its foundation in 1935
- Donald MacLeod, 65, Scottish bagpiper and composer
- Bernhard Rogge, 82, German naval officer
- Masaharu Taguchi, 66, Japanese freestyle swimmer and Olympic gold medalist
- Pablo Larraín Tejada, 88, Chilean politician who served as a member of the Chamber of Deputies of Chile

=== 30 ===
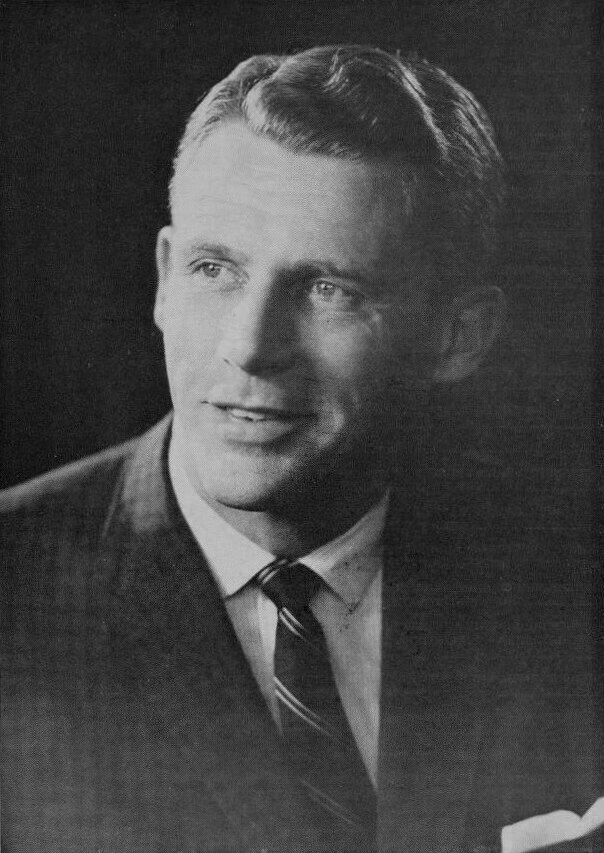
James Auld

- Kwadwo Agyei Agyapong, 55, Ghanaian judge
- James Auld, 60, Canadian politician
- Jean Bolo, 62, French actor
- Abner Dean, 72, American cartoonist, his darkly humorous drawings often depicted barren landscapes and dead trees, or grim and decaying urban environments
- J.-Wilfrid Dufresne, 70 Canadian politician
- Cecilia Koranteng-Addow, 46, Ghanaian judge
- Lars Lundström, 67, Swedish sailor and Olympian
- Milivoj Matošec, 52, Croatian children's writer, journalist and editor
- Viktor Myagkiy, 63, Soviet Ukrainian theater and film actor
- Frederick Poku Sarkodee, 54, Ghanaian judge
- Malcolm Saville, 81, English writer
- Sarangdhar Sinha, 83, Indian legislator, parliamentarian and academic
- Russell W. Volckmann, 70, United States Army general

== Sources ==
- Austen, Roger (1977). Playing the Game: The Homosexual Novel in America (1st ed.). Indianapolis: The Bobbs-Merrill Company. ISBN 978-0-672-52287-1.
- Holmesby, Russell; Main, Jim (2007). The Encyclopedia Of AFL Footballers. BAS Publishing. ISBN 9781920910785.
- Holmesby, Russell; Main, Jim (2014). The Encyclopedia of AFL Footballers: every AFL/VFL player since 1897 (10th ed.). Seaford, Victoria: BAS Publishing. ISBN 978-1-921496-32-5.
- Nijampuri, Ashraf Ali (2013). The Hundred (100 Great Scholars from Bangladesh) (1st ed.). Hathazari, Chittagong: Salman Publication. ISBN 978-112009250-2. Archived from the original on December 2, 2021.
- Ott, Frederick W (1986). The great German films.
- Podell, Janet; Anzovin, Steven, eds. (1983). The Annual Obituary, 1982. St. James Press. ISBN 9780912289014.
- Tye, Larry (2009). Satchel: The Life and Times of an American Legend. New York: Random House. ISBN 978-1400066513.
- Ullah, Ahmad; Qadir, Ridwanul (2018). মাশায়েখে চাটগাম [Scholars of Chittagong] (in Bengali). Dhaka: Ahmad Publications. ISBN 978-984-92106-4-1.
- Young, Ian (1975). The Male Homosexual in Literature: A Bibliography (1st ed.). Metuchen, New Jersey: The Scarecrow Press. ISBN 978-0-8108-0861-4.
