= Welter =

Welter may refer to

- Welter (magazine), a literary magazine based at the University of Baltimore, United States
- Welter (surname)
- Welter Racing, French sports car maker
- Welterweight, a weight class division in combat sports, especially boxing
