= The Baby and the Battleship =

1956 British film by Jay Lewis

- British theatrical poster
- Directed by: Jay Lewis
- Screenplay by: Jay Lewis
- Produced by: Antony Darnborough
- Starring: John Mills; Richard Attenborough
- Cinematography: Harry Waxman
- Music by: Humphrey Searle
- Production companies: Jay Lewis Productions; British Lion Films
- Distributed by: British Lion Films; Distributors Corporation of America (US)
- Release dates: 10 July 1956 (London, England); 30 September 1957 (New York, USA)
- Running time: 96 minutes
- Country: England
- Language: English
- Box office: £258,845 (UK)

The Baby and the Battleship is a colour 1956 British comedy film directed by Jay Lewis and starring John Mills, Richard Attenborough and André Morell. It is based on the 1956 novel by Anthony Thorne with a screenplay by Richard De Roy, Gilbert Hackforth-Jones and Bryan Forbes. The Royal Navy provided much cooperation with sequences filmed aboard HMS Birmingham and in Malta.

== Plot ==
When a group of Royal Navy sailors go ashore on leave in Naples, they go to visit an old friend who is a baker. He is the father of 12 daughters and, to his great pride and relief, an infant son. So that one of them can take the eldest daughter out that night, they are required to take the son with them to an outdoor dance. 'Puncher' has a reputation for fighting and drinking and, despite his best efforts to live up to his pledge to reform his behaviour, he is provoked by two sailors from another ship and starts a fight while his friend 'Knocker' is dancing with the eldest daughter. During the brawl, Puncher Roberts is knocked unconscious while Knocker and the sister run away on the arrival of police, abandoning the baby in the square. Puncher regains consciousness and finds the square empty, except for the baby. Unable to find his friend Knocker, or the child's adult sister, he smuggles the baby aboard their ship, leaving a message in chalk on the wharfside telling Knocker he has taken 'Number 13' on board. He elicits the help of his fellow sailors to care for the baby while hiding it from their superiors, all while in the midst of a series of joint operations with Allied navies off the coast of Italy. Knocker seeks the help of his rather casual shore-based senior officer but to little avail as the ship also maintains radio silence. Knocker makes the most of the unexpected time among the baker's extended family which becomes tense as the return of the baby is delayed. When Puncher's ship is about to have to surrender to superior forces during training exercises, the Captain is able to use the presence of the baby to extricate himself from an embarrassing loss. The ship returns to port and the entire family is re-united on board.

== Cast ==
- John Mills as Puncher Roberts
- Richard Attenborough as Knocker White
- André Morell as Marshal
- Bryan Forbes as Professor Evans
- Michael Hordern as Captain Hugh
- Ernest Clark as Commander Geoffrey Digby
- Harry Locke as Chief Petty Officer Blades
- Michael Howard as Joe
- Lionel Jeffries as George
- Clifford Mollison as Sails
- Thorley Walters as Lieutenant Setley
- Duncan Lamont as Master-at-Arms
- Lisa Gastoni as Maria
- Cyril Raymond as PMO
- Harold Siddons as Whiskers
- D. A. Clarke-Smith as The Admiral
- Kenneth Griffith as Sub-Lieutenant
- John Le Mesurier as The Marshal's aide
- Carlo Giustini as Carlo Vespucci
- Ferdy Mayne as interpreter
- Vincent Barbi as second brother
- Gordon Jackson as Harry
- Vittorio Vittori as third brother
- Martyn Garrett as the baby
- Barry Foster as sailor at dance
- Robert Ayres as American Captain
- Sam Kydd as Chief Steward

== Reception ==
=== Critical ===
The Monthly Film Bulletin wrote: "This predictable script strenuously exploits all the humour to be derived from such situations as the officer/ordinary seaman relationship, the Cambridge "intellectual" who reads Freud and Berenson, and language misunderstandings. Consequently, the slender nature of the joke causes the film to peter out after its early stages. Those involved put on a brave front and the baby is quite endearing, but flair and sparkle are, for the most part, absent."

=== Box office ===
The Baby and the Battleship was one of the ten most popular films at the British box office in 1956.
