= Welter (surname) =

Welter is a Germanic surname that may refer to:

- Albert Welter (born 1952), American Buddhist scholar
- Alexandre Welter (born 1953), Brazilian sailor
- Ariadna Welter (1930–1998), Mexican film actress
- Charles Welter (1880–1972), Dutch minister
- David Welter, American politician
- Emmi Welter (1887–1971), German politician
- Erich Welter (1900–1982), German journalist
- Felix Welter (1889-1991), Luxembourgish jurist
- Gabriel Welter (1890–1954), German archaeologist
- Jan Welter (1895-1960), Dutch weightlifter
- Jean Welter (1901–1977), Luxembourgish boxer
- Jennifer Welter (born 1977), American football player and coach
- Karol Welter (born 1995), Polish boxer
- Kurt Welter (1916–1949), German fighter ace
- Linda Christian (born Blanca Rosa Welter) (1923-2011), Mexican film actress
- Marcel Welter (1924-2009), Luxembourgish footballer
- Marion Welter (born 1965), Luxembourgish singer
- Michel Welter (1859–1924), Luxembourgish politician
- Nik Welter (1871–1951), Luxembourgish writer and politician
