= Valery Ilyinykh =

Russian artistic gymnast

- Валерий Леонидович Ильиных
- Full name: Valery Leonidovich Ilyinykh
- Born: 7 August 1947 Novosibirsk, Russian SFSR, Soviet Union
- Died: 3 June 1982 (aged 34) Moscow, Russian SFSR, Soviet Union
- Height: 1.68 m (5 ft 6 in)

Gymnastics career
- Discipline: Men's artistic gymnastics
- Country represented: Soviet Union
- Club: Dynamo Moscow
Medal record
Men's artistic gymnastics
Representing Soviet Union
Olympic Games
Silver medal – second place	1968 Mexico City	Team

Valery Leonidovich Ilyinykh (Russian: Валерий Леонидович Ильиных; 7 August 1947 – 3 June 1982) was a Soviet gymnast. He competed at the 1968 Summer Olympics in all artistic gymnastics events and won a silver medal in the team competition. Individually his best result was eighth place on the horizontal bar.
