= Abdulrachman Setjowibowo =

Indonesian police officer and diplomat

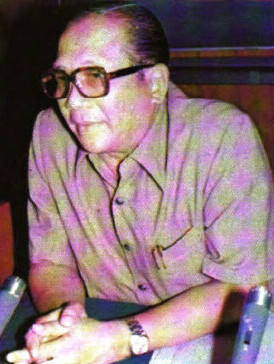

Ambassador of Indonesia to Finland
- In office 23 June 1979 – 24 June 1982
- President: Suharto
- Preceded by: Moekijat
- Succeeded by: Soerjadi Kromomihardjo

Director General for Agrarian Affairs
- In office 29 March 1969 – 5 August 1978
- President: Suharto
- Preceded by: Suyono Suparto; Basuki Rahmat (acting)
- Succeeded by: Daryono

Member of the People's Representative Council
- In office 25 June 1960 – 29 March 1969
- President: Sukarno
- Parliamentary group: Armed Forces

Personal details
- Born: 21 September 1916 Kebumen, Dutch East Indies
- Died: 24 June 1982 (aged 65) Amsterdam, Netherlands
- Party: Golkar

Military service
- Allegiance: Indonesia
- Branch/service: Police
- Years of service: 1945-1971
- Rank: Major general
- Commands: International Division

Abdulrachman Setjowibowo (21 September 1916 – 24 June 1982) was an Indonesian police officer, politician, bureaucrat, and diplomat who served as a member of parliament from 1960 until 1969 and as the nation's ambassador to Finland from 1979 until his death.

== Early life and career ==
Abdulrachman Setjowibowo was born on 21 September 1916 in Kebumen, a regency of the Dutch East Indies. He worked as a bureaucrat for the Dutch East Indies Government in the Grobogan Regency and continued his career after Japanese forces occupied the Dutch East Indies. One of his positions during the occupation period was as the head of the Pulukulon District.

== Police career ==
Abdulrachman entered police service following the independence of Indonesia in 1945. He was appointed as the Head of the Organizational Affairs in the Indonesian police in 1950s. Several years later, in August 1956, he and three other police officers was sent to the United States to attend a police course for six months. He later became the expert staff to the chief of police in international affairs and head of the foreign relation division in the national police.

Abdulrachman's rank was promoted from police senior commissioner to brigadier general in the midst of his tenure as a member of parliament. He received another promotion to major general while holding the office of director general. He retired from the police force in January 1971.

== Member of the National Planning Council ==
After holding various positions inside the police forces, Abdulrachman was appointed as the member of the newly formed National Planning Council (predecessor of the Ministry of National Development Planning) in July 1959. He was sworn into office on 14 August 1959.

A month after he was sworn into office, the plenary session of the council was held on 21 September. He joined the council's statehood section and later became the member of the defence and security section until November 1959. Afterwards, he was moved to the national research section from December 1959 until February 1960 before returning to the defence and security section from March until April 1960.

Abdulrachman was appointed as a member of the council's working body in January 1961. The body was tasked to assist the President of Indonesia in planning, assessing, and supervise the national development progress. He continued to hold membership until the National Planning Council was dissolved in 1963.

== Member of the People's Representative Council ==
On 24 June 1960, Abdulrachman was appointed as a member of the newly formed People's Representative Council of Mutual Assistance, representing the armed forces and the police forces inside the parliament. He was sworn in for the office the day after.

As members of the People's Representative Council were also members of the People's Consultative Assembly, Abdulrachman had to became members of committees in both chambers. He became a member of the C committee — which handles governance, security, and defence affairs — in the People's Consultative Assembly and a member of the B commission — which handles finance — in the People's Representative Council.

Abdulrachman became a candidate in a Golkar internal primary for the party's parliament speaker nominee in May 1966. He only obtained six out of seventy five votes in the primary and lost to Mursalin Daeng Mamangung and Sjarif Thajeb.

Abdulrachman was elected as the chairman of the parliament's budget committee after serving several years as a regular member. He handed over his office to fellow police officer Mansur on 13 March 1968. During his tenure in the budget committee, Setjowibowo was involved in examining the bill on improvement and renewal of the state tax collection submitted by the government. He criticized the bill by stating that the bill's title was in contradiction with its content and that a clause in the bill which would give powers to the finance minister to change tax ordinances violated article 33 of the constitution.

== Sport organizations ==
Aside from his career in the parliament and politics, Abdulrachman was also active in football organizations. He was one of the key figures in organizing the 1962 Asian Games and later became the honorary chairman of the football team Persija Jakarta and the deputy chairman of the Football Association of Indonesia. When an internal conflict between Persija and the association occurred, Abdulrachman became the acting chairman of the association after the previous chairman, Maulwi Saelan, left his post. He later went on to became Indonesia's representative in the Asian Games Federation Council for the 1970 Asian Games.

== Director General of Agrarian Affairs ==
After serving as a member of parliament for nine years, Abdulrachman became the Director General of Agrarian Affairs under the Ministry of Home Affairs on 29 March 1969.

He was replaced from the office by Daryono on 5 August 1978. Several months prior to his replacement, he was appointed by the Minister of Research and Technology as the deputy chairman of the research team for land matters.

== Indonesian Ambassador to Finland ==
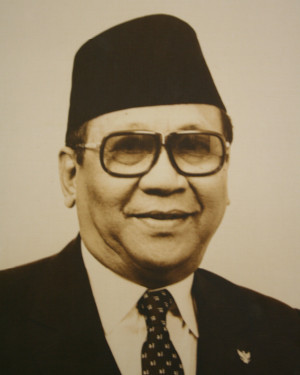
Abdulrachman Setjowibowo as an ambassador.

Abdulrachman was nominated as the Indonesian Ambassador to Finland not long after his resignation from the directorate general. The Finland government approved his nomination in early June 1979, and Abdulrachman was sworn in as the Indonesian Ambassador to Finland on 23 June 1979. In the midst of his tenure as ambassador, Abdulrachman died on 24 June 1982 in Amsterdam, Netherlands. He was buried at a cemetery in Kuncen, Yogyakarta.

== Family ==
Abdulrachman's daughter, Nani Supadmiani Titi Utari, was married to Mohammad Sarengat, an Indonesian field sprinter and military doctor. When Sarengat was about to be deployed to West Kalimantan during the Indonesia–Malaysia confrontation, Abdulrachman visited Utari to console her and persuade her to accept Sarengat's departure.
