= Norman Rowlstone Jarrett =

British colonial administrator (1889–1982)

Norman Rowlstone Jarrett CMG

British Resident of Selangor
- In office 1941–1941
- Preceded by: George Montgomery Kidd
- Succeeded by: Office discontinued

British Advisor of Terengganu
- In office 1933–1934
- Preceded by: Charles Cuthbert Brown
- Succeeded by: John Erskine Kempe

British Advisor of Terengganu
- In office 1936–1937
- Preceded by: John Erskine Kempe
- Succeeded by: Patrick Alexander Bruce McKerron

Personal details
- Born: 1889
- Died: 21 June 1982 (aged 92–93)
- Spouse: Doris Elaine Griffith (m. 1910) Violet Wilkinson (m. 1939)
- Occupation: Colonial Administrator

Norman Rowlstone Jarrett CMG (1889 – 21 June 1982) was a British colonial administrator in Malaya.

== Career ==
Norman Rowlstone Jarrett was born in 1889, only son of Mr and Mrs Arthur Jarrett of Brighton, and joined the Malay civil service as a cadet in 1912. In 1915, he was appointed assistant Controller of Labour in Penang, and then served in various positions including assistant District Officer, Klang (1917), District Officer, Kuala Langat (1922), District Officer, Ulu Selangor (1925), assistant Controller of Labour (1925), District Officer, Krian (1931), and District Officer Klang (1933).

From 1933-34, he was acting British Adviser to Terengganu, and again from 1936–37, having been appointed to act as Under Secretary of the Federated Malay States in 1934.

In 1939, he went to Singapore to take up the position of Food Controller for the colony. In the same year he was also appointed Comptroller of Customs for the Straits Settlements and Federated Malay States, and was sworn in as a member of the Legislative Council of the Straits Settlements. He introduced measures to control the supply and price of food during the wartime administration to ensure adequate supply and to prevent profiteering.

In 1941, he went to Kuala Lumpur and acted as the last British Resident of Selangor. From 1942 to 1945, during the Second World War, he was interned as POW in Changi and Sime Road camps in Singapore, and was the camp's quartermaster. After the war he returned to England, and from 1946 to 1953 was the Secretary of the Association of British Malaya in London.

== Personal life and death ==
Jarrett married twice; to Doris Elaine Griffith in 1916, and to Violet Wilkinson in 1939. He died on 21 June 1982, aged 93.

== Honours ==
Jarrett was appointed CMG in the 1946 New Year Honours.
