= John Bell (Florida politician) =

American politician (1916–1982)

Jack Bell
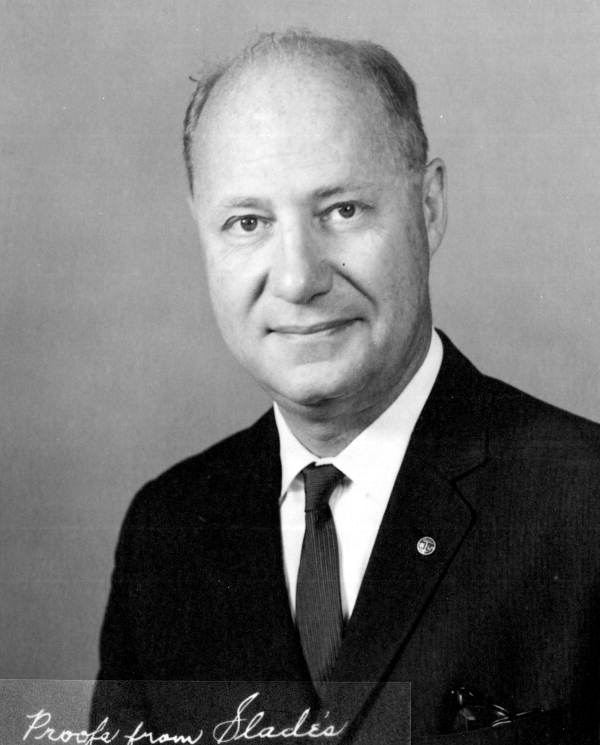

Member of the Florida Senate from the 38th district
- In office 1967–1971
- Preceded by: Richard Deeb
- Succeeded by: Ralph Poston

Member of the Florida House of Representatives from the Broward district
- In office 1963–1966

Personal details
- Born: September 16, 1916 New York City, New York, U.S.
- Died: June 1, 1982 (aged 65) Broward County, Florida, U.S.
- Party: Republican
- Education: Columbia University; Columbia Law School
- Occupation: attorney

John W. Bell (September 16, 1916 – June 1, 1982) was an American politician from Florida.

Bell was born in New York and came to Florida in 1946. An attorney, he attended Columbia University and Columbia Law School. He served in the Florida State Senate from 1967 to 1971, as a member of the Republican Party (38th district). He also served in the Florida House of Representatives from 1963 to 1966.
