= Atta Mohammad Hami =

Pakistani poet

- عطا محمد حامي
- Born: Atta Mohammad; 1 January 1919; Sohu Kanasira, Khairpur District Sindh
- Died: 3 June 1982 (aged 63); Khairpur District, Sindh, Pakistan
- Occupation: Poet

Atta Mohammad Hami (Sindhi: ڊاڪٽر عطا محمد حامي) (1919–1982) was a Pakistani poet, writer and scholar. He wrote a PhD dissertation about Talpurs titled The role of Talpurs in literature, politics and culture which is recognized as one of the prominent research works covering their contribution or role in politics, literature and culture.
