= Marcus Bosley =

Australian cricketer (1897–1982)

Personal information
- Born: 10 August 1897; Liverpool, New South Wales, Australia
- Died: 12 June 1982 (aged 84); Newport, New South Wales, Australia
- Source: ESPNcricinfo, 23 December 2016

Marcus Bosley (10 August 1897 – 12 June 1982) was an Australian cricketer. He played one first-class match for New South Wales in 1924/25.

== See also ==
- List of New South Wales representative cricketers
