= Dora Riedel =

Chilean architect

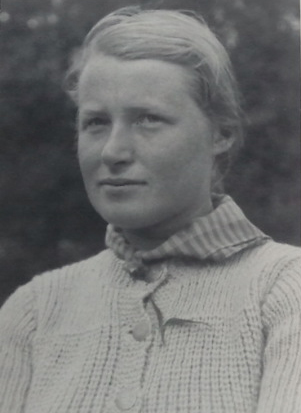
- Riedel in 1935
- Born: 11 March 1906; Valdivia
- Died: 21 June 1982 (aged 76); Innsbruck

Dora Riedel Seinecke (1906–1982) was a Chilean architect who, in 1930, became the first woman to receive an architectural degree in Chile.

== Early life and education ==
Dora Riedel was born on 11 March 1906 in Valdivia, Chile to German parents Carlos Riedel and Herminia Seinecke Deppe. She had a sister Alice and a brother Carlos. She began her education at the German School in Valdivia. After the end of the First World War, it is believed that the Riedel Seinecke family returned to Germany in 1918, living in Berlin and then returning to Chile in 1920. She moved with her family to the port city of Valparaíso, where she took lessons in oil painting and completed her secondary education. This interest in art inspired her to take up architecture rather than pursue a career in mathematics.

Her father was supportive and approached the director of the School of Architecture at the University of Chile to ask if they accepted women. When asked, the director confirmed that the school did accept woman and that Frida Ganther was already studying there. (Ganther completed the course of studies but died before she could be awarded a degree.) In 1925, Riedel matriculated at the University of Chile. She met her good friend Frances Barber whilst studying there. On 9 December 1930 Dora Riedel became the first woman to receive a degree in architecture in the country.

== Career ==
Following her graduation, Riedel spent a year working at the Chilean Ministry of Public Works.

In 1931, Riedel travelled to Germany, at first to Berlin then in 1933 where she continued her education at the Faculty of Architecture at the University of Stuttgart, studying with Paul Bonatz, Paul Schmitthenner and Heinz Wetzel completing her doctorate in Interior Architecture.

== Personal life ==
In Germany, she met architect Anton Hammerle, whom she married on 18 November 1934. Over the following decade they had five children: Anton, Christina, Heinrich, Elisabeth and Herbert. The family lived in Munich until 1938, but then moved to Hammerle's native Tyrol, where he worked as a municipal architect and Director of Architecture and Urban Planning in Innsbruck. Riedel designed the family home in Innsbruck, which was completed in 1947. She also designed the interior. This was to remain the only house that Riedel planned and completed.

Dora Riedel Seinecke died on 21 June 1982 in Innsbruck.

== Commemoration ==
In 2017, the Colegio de Arquitectos de Chile introduced the Dora Riedel Prize in honor of Riedel. In August 2018, the prize was presented for the first time to architect Paulina Villalobos; the award ceremony was also attended by Veronika Pavlu Hammerle, a granddaughter of Dora Riedel, who travelled specially from Austria.
