= Billy Sarll =

Australian rules footballer

Personal information
- Full name: William Maynard Sarll
- Born: 9 October 1899; Longwarry, Victoria
- Died: 6 June 1982 (aged 82); Heidelberg, Victoria
- Original team: Warrnambool

Playing career^{1}
Years	Club	Games (Goals)
1920	St Kilda	4 (2)
- ^{1} Playing statistics correct to the end of 1920.

William Maynard Sarll (9 October 1899 – 6 June 1982) was an Australian rules footballer who played with St Kilda in the Victorian Football League (VFL).
