= Sandy Buckle =

Australian cricketer

Personal information
- Full name: Frank Buckle
- Born: 11 November 1891; Sydney, Australia
- Died: 4 June 1982 (aged 90); Sydney, Australia
- Source: ESPNcricinfo, 23 December 2016

Sandy Buckle (11 November 1891 – 4 June 1982) was an Australian cricketer. He played one first-class match for New South Wales in 1913/14.

== See also ==
- List of New South Wales representative cricketers
