= Renzo Grandi =

Italian weightlifter

Personal information
- Nationality: Italian
- Born: 29 April 1934 Mantua, Italy
- Died: 17 June 1982 (aged 48)

Sport
- Sport: Weightlifting

Renzo Grandi (29 April 1934 – 17 June 1982) was an Italian weightlifter. He competed at the 1960 Summer Olympics and the 1964 Summer Olympics.
