= Floyd W. Pettie =

State legislator

Member of the Colorado House of Representatives from the 17th district
- In office 1973–1975

Personal details
- Born: July 24, 1919 Omaha, Nebraska, US
- Died: June 8, 1982 (aged 62) Colorado Springs, Colorado, US
- Party: Republican

Floyd W. Pettie (July 24, 1919 – June 8, 1982) was an American politician, civil servant, and military officer. He was a state legislator in Colorado. He was a Republican.

== Life and career ==
Born in Omaha, Pettie graduated from the University of Nebraska and then served in the United States Army from 1940 to 1960. He achieved the rank of chief warrant officer and was a veteran of both World War II and the Korean War. In 1969 he became the first black person elected to the Colorado Springs City Council.

In 1972 he was elected to the Colorado House of Representatives (CHR) as a representative from for the 17th district. He served in the CHR from 1973 to 1975. From 1975 until his death in 1982 Pettie was director of the Disaster Emergency Service for El Paso County, Colorado.

He died of a heart attack at St. Francis Hospital, Colorado Springs, on June 8, 1982.
