= Bill Pavey =

Australian rules footballer, born 1913

Personal information
- Full name: William Edward Pavey
- Born: 26 September 1913; Yarraville, Victoria
- Died: 14 June 1982 (aged 68); Heidelberg, Victoria
- Original team: Newport
- Height: 179 cm (5 ft 10 in)
- Weight: 78 kg (172 lb)
- Position: Ruck / Defence

Playing career^{1}
Years	Club	Games (Goals)
1937–45	Hawthorn	100 (7)
- ^{1} Playing statistics correct to the end of 1945.

William Edward Pavey (26 September 1913 – 14 June 1982) was an Australian rules footballer who played with Hawthorn in the Victorian Football League (VFL).

The son of William Edward Pavey snr (1888–1961) and Mary Elizabeth Pavey, née Travers (1890–1952), William Edward Pavey was born in Yarraville on 26 September 1913.
