= Liudmila Terentʹeva =

Soviet ethnographer and sociologist (1910–1982)

- Born: 1910; Barnaul, Altai
- Died: 9 June 1982 (aged 71–72); Moscow, Soviet Union
- Occupation: Ethnographer

Liudmila Nikolevna Terentʹeva (1910 – 9 June 1982) (Russian: Людмила Николаевна Терентьева) was a Soviet ethnographer and sociologist who primarily studied the Baltic peoples and directed the compilation of a major atlas of the Baltic states. Some of her notable work was on Baltic family and marriage customs. She authored more than one hundred sociological publications during her lifetime.
