= Jack P. King =

American politician (1909–1982)

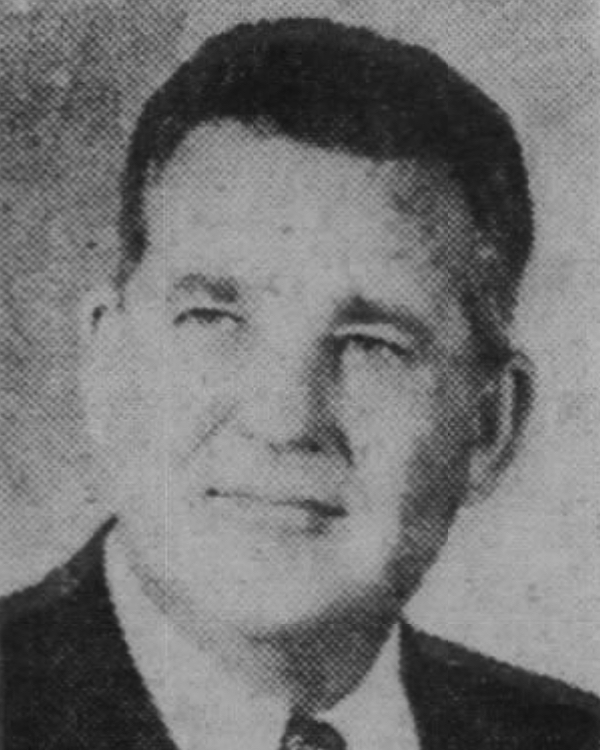

Member of the Hawaii House of Representatives from the 4th district
- In office February 16, 1949 – February 16, 1955 Serving with Flora Kaai Hayes, Samuel M. Ichinose, Walter F. McGuire, Kenneth T. Olds, Hebden Porteus, J. Ward Russell, W. Russell Starr, Webley Edwards
- Preceded by: Walter H. Dillingham
- Succeeded by: Russell K. Kono

Personal details
- Born: John Page King; April 13, 1909 Richmond, Virginia, U.S.
- Died: June 13, 1982 (aged 73) Mililani, Hawaii, U.S.
- Party: Republican
- Spouse: Louise Dickson (m. 1933)
- Children: 3
- Education: University of Hawaiʻi (BA)
- Occupation: Politician

John Page King (April 13, 1909 – June 13, 1982) was an American politician who served in the Hawaii House of Representatives from 1949 to 1955, representing the 4th legislative district of Hawaii as a Republican.

== Early life and education ==
King was born in Richmond, Virginia, on April 13, 1909. He attended the University of Hawaiʻi, graduating with a Bachelor of Arts.

== Career ==
King was an official with the territorial office of civil defense during World War II.

King served in the Hawaii House of Representatives from 1949 to 1955, representing the 4th legislative district of Hawaii as a Republican. He was succeeded in office by Russell K. Kono.

== Personal life and death ==
In 1933, King married Louise Dickson, with whom he had three daughters.

King died at the age of 73 in Mililani, Hawaii, on June 13, 1982.

Hawaii House of Representatives
Preceded by Walter H. Dillingham	Member of the Hawaii House of Representatives from the 4th district 1949–1955; Served alongside: Flora Kaai Hayes, Samuel M. Ichinose, Walter F. McGuire, Kenneth T. Olds, Hebden Porteus, J. Ward Russell, W. Russell Starr, Webley Edwards	Succeeded by Russell K. Kono
