= Vitthal Prasad Sharma =

Indian politician

- Born: 20 June 1920
- Died: 12 June 1982 (aged 61)
- Occupation: Politician/businessman
- Political party: Bharatiya Janata Party

Vitthal Prasad Sharma (20 June 1920 – 12 June 1982) was an Indian politician and elected 2 times as the Member of Legislative Assembly in 1967 and 1977 in Mohanlal Sukhadiya Government and in Bhairon Singh Shekhawat government respectively. He was considered as a very influential and respected personality in the Rajasthan politics.

== Early life ==
Vitthal Prasad Sharma was born in Manohar Thana town of Jhalawar district of Rajasthan in the family of priests. His father's name was Bhanwar Lal Sharma. He had an elder brother Ballabh Prasad Sharma. His early life was full of struggles, as he was born in a poor family and started to work as a private bus conductor and later served in Indian Railways. Later he had a cloth center in Aklera and he was a road contractor also. He was married to Shakuntala and he has 4 daughters and a son.

== Political career ==
Right from his childhood he was interested in politics and was a freedom fighter. He was first elected as a "pradhan" in 1960 and 1965. His turning point in political life was in 1967 when he was elected as an MLA in the assembly elections. And again was elected in 1977. He died on 12 June 1982 due to a heart stroke. At that time he was at the peak of his career.
