= Victor Pellier =

French cyclist

Personal information
- Born: 22 June 1901 Compiègne, France
- Died: 23 June 1982 (aged 81) La Garenne-Colombes, France

Cycling career
- Sport: Cycling
- Discipline: Road
- Role: Rider

Victor Pellier (22 June 1901 – 23 June 1982) was a French racing cyclist. He rode in the 1927 Tour de France.
