= Nan Mackinnon =

Traditional Scots Gaelic singer-storyteller on the Island of Vatersay in Outer Hebrides

Nan MacKinnon
- Born: 12 December 1902; Kentangaval on Barra, Outer Hebrides
- Died: June 24, 1982 (aged 79); Vatersay
- Other name: Nan Eachainn Fhionnlaigh
- Occupations: Scots Gaelic singer-songwriter and storyteller

Nan MacKinnon (Nan Eachainn Fhionnlaigh) (12 December 1902 to 24 June 1982) was a traditional singer and storyteller on the Island of Vatersay, Scotland.

== Early life and work ==
Nan MacKinnon was born in Kentangaval on the Isle of Barra, the daughter of a fisherman, Hector MacKinnon and his wife Mary MacPhee. She was the youngest of seven children. Apart from five years on the mainland, she lived in Vatersay, having moved there with her family when she was four.

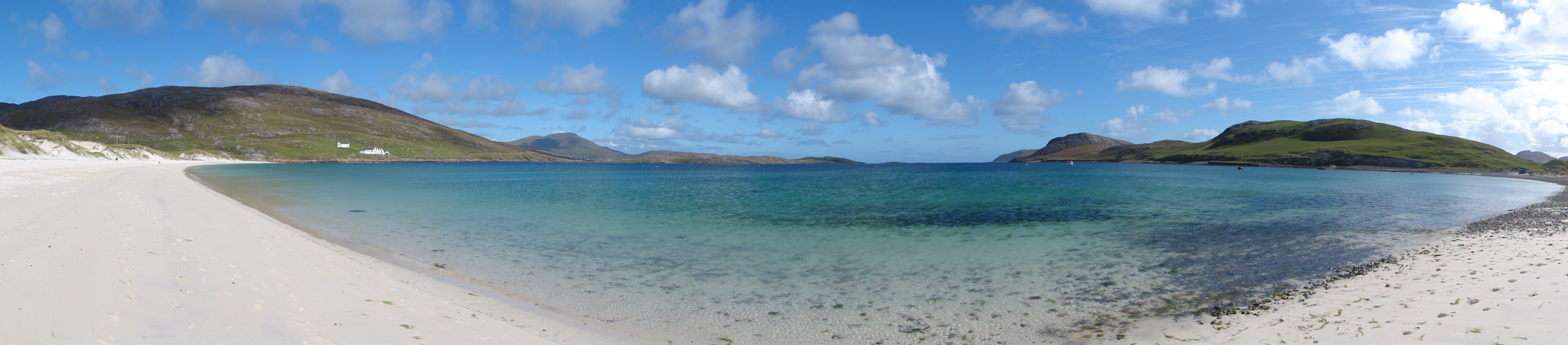
Vatersay

It was a politically tumultuous time in the Highlands during her early life. Her family had won security of tenure twenty years before she was born and yet there remained a strong sense of injustice at how uneven the distribution of land was in the Highlands. So, in 1907, her father was part of the Vatersay Raiders (landless farmers from Barra and Mingulay) who took part in a land raid on Vatersay in order to establish crofts on the hitherto neglected land there.

Vatersay

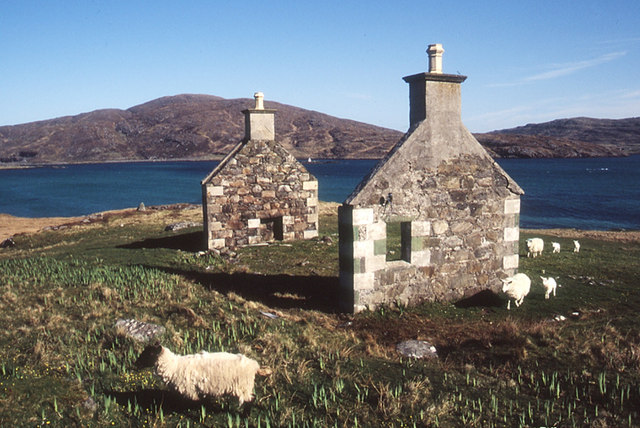
Derelict house near Uidh, Vatersay

Her father, Hector, was descended from the MacKinnons of Strath, Skye who had held the role of 'grazing constables' (a person appointed to administer common grazings for crofters) for the MacNeils of Barra until the 19th century. Her mother came from the island of Mingulay, and the MacPhee family, who – according to local tradition – had come to settle in Barra in the 14th century.

Mackinnon grew up convinced of the importance of the oral tradition to Gaelic communities and would spend hours practising all the stories and songs she loved until she knew them by heart.

After she had concluded her schooling, Mackinnon left home when she was seventeen. She then spent a number of years working in service for a variety of people in Argyll as was common for women of her age at the time. Later, she would go onto work in the herring trade in Shetland and Yarmouth before finally ending up in Glasgow.

In 1931 the population of Vatersay was recorded at 240 and it was back to Vatersay that Mackinnon would return following the news of a family bereavement.

From 1940, after the untimely death of her sister, she was compelled to return to Vatersay to look after and raise her late sister's four children as the children's father was often away at sea for long periods.

== A treasure trove of knowledge ==
Mackinnon was a tradition-bearer and had an immense repertoire of songs, stories and miscellaneous lore (most of which she had learned from her mother) which was first recorded by a fellow native of Barra, Donald MacPherson.

Later, the University of Edinburgh's School of Scottish Studies recorded her contributions: reciting over 1,000 stories, anecdotes and proverbs as well as singing 600 songs she knew. All carried in her memory. Some songs came from the island of Mingulay where she had family connections but has now become long since deserted.

External audio
- Gura mis' tha gu tinn A sad and bitter song by a woman who has lost the man she loved to another woman.
- Dh'Èirich Mi Moch, dh'Èirich Mi Moch a girl who had a son by a fairy lover. Her family were unhappy about this, and made her leave the child beside the fairy hill. When the fairy lover got up in the morning, he found the child and composed this song

Mingulay Outer Hebrides

Apart from her songs, she was known for sharing traditional tales and legends, which often featured supernatural elements. She also had extensive knowledge regarding the traditions of Uist and Barra. This included information on historical island diets, remedies, food alternatives during shortages, feast day practices and traditional interpretation of omens and dreams.

In all, Mackinnon contributed more than any other person to the archives as regards Scottish Gaelic material.

"[Each story] tells the ways of the people that lived in those days. The waulking songs kept news alive from generation to generation. There were no newspapers, whereas today we read it in the papers and forget about it tomorrow. But the songs kept it alive. Those happenings that happened centuries ago are still to be told in song and story. It's wonderful."

— Nan Mackinnon, Tobar an Dualchais.

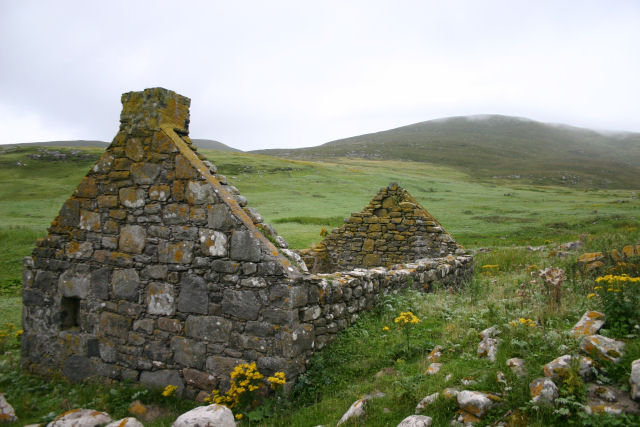
Ruined Building on Mingulay

Mingulay

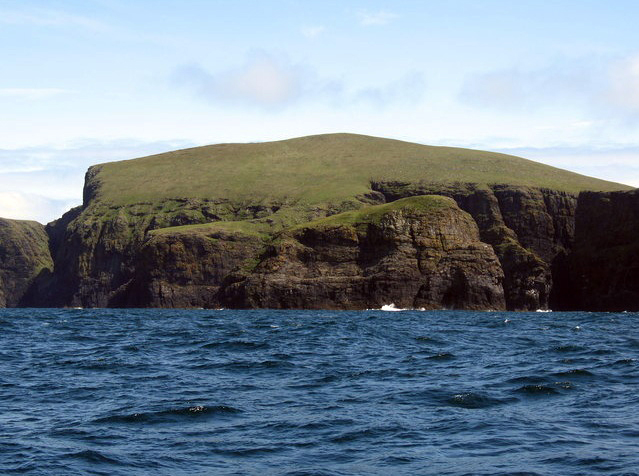
Western cliffs of Mingulay

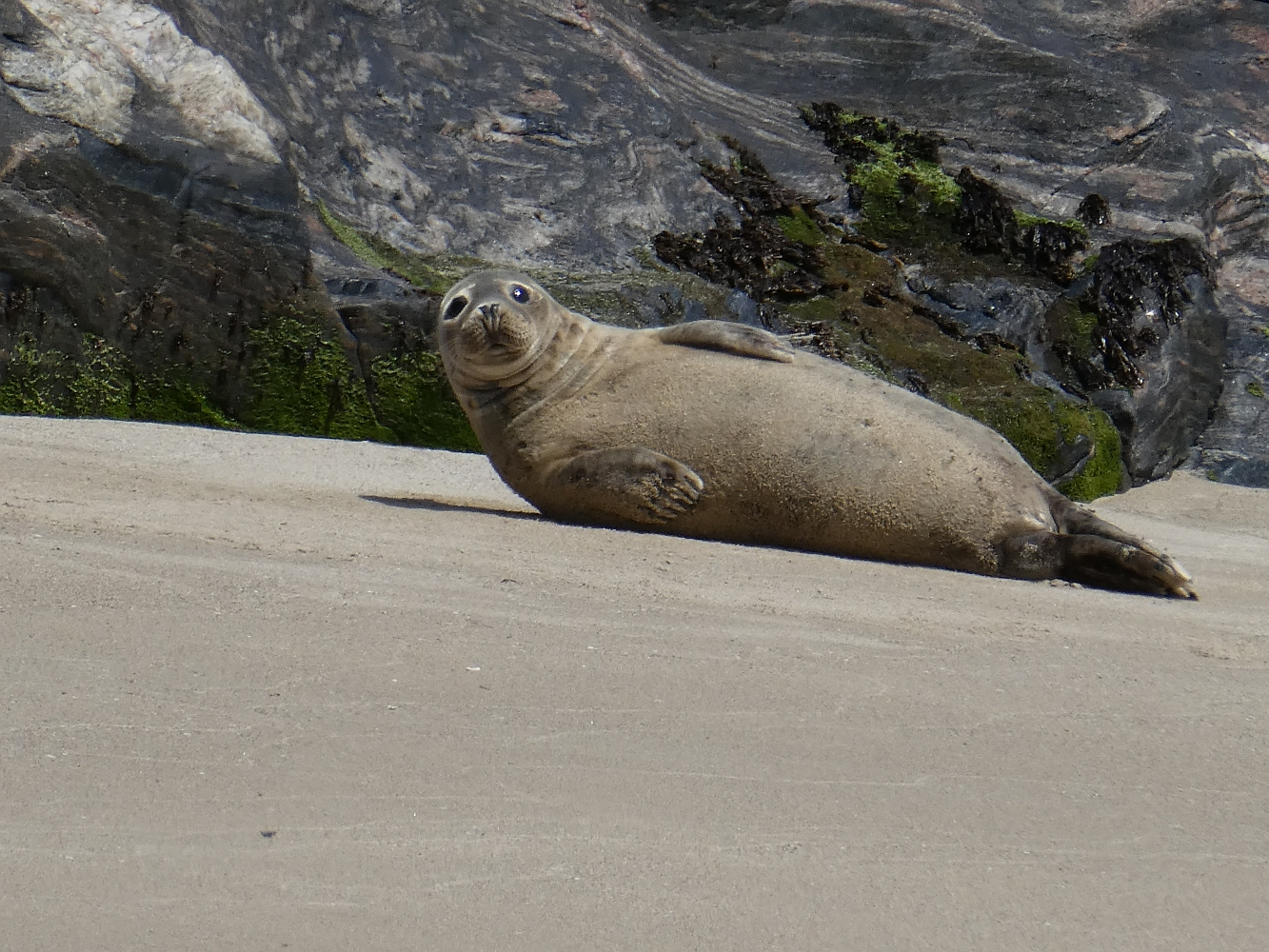
Mingulay - Seal on the beach

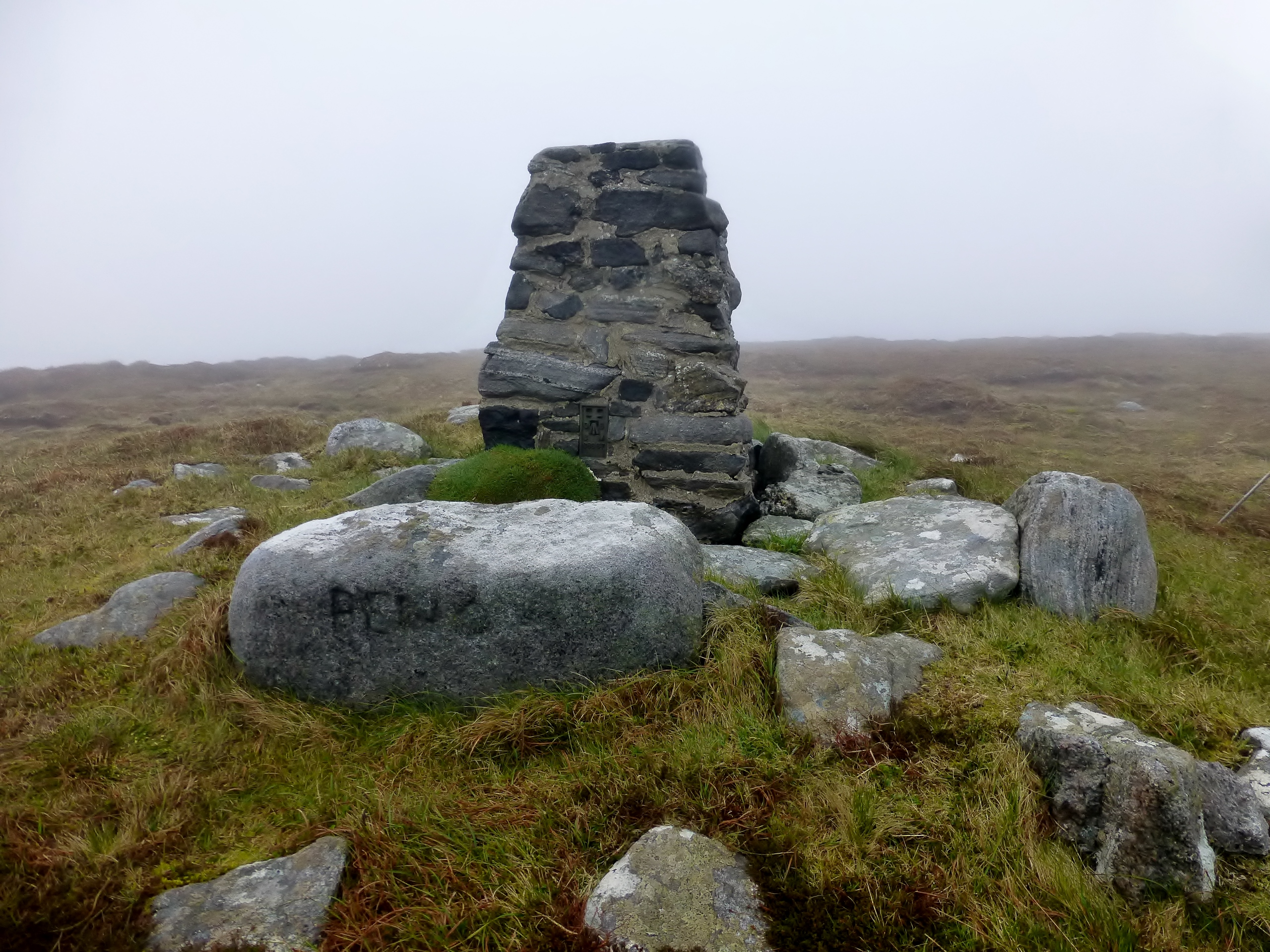
Càrnan Summit Trig, Mingulay-Miùghlaigh

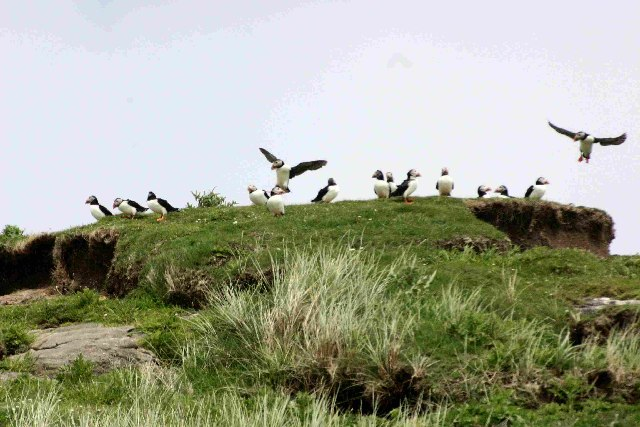
Mingulay birds

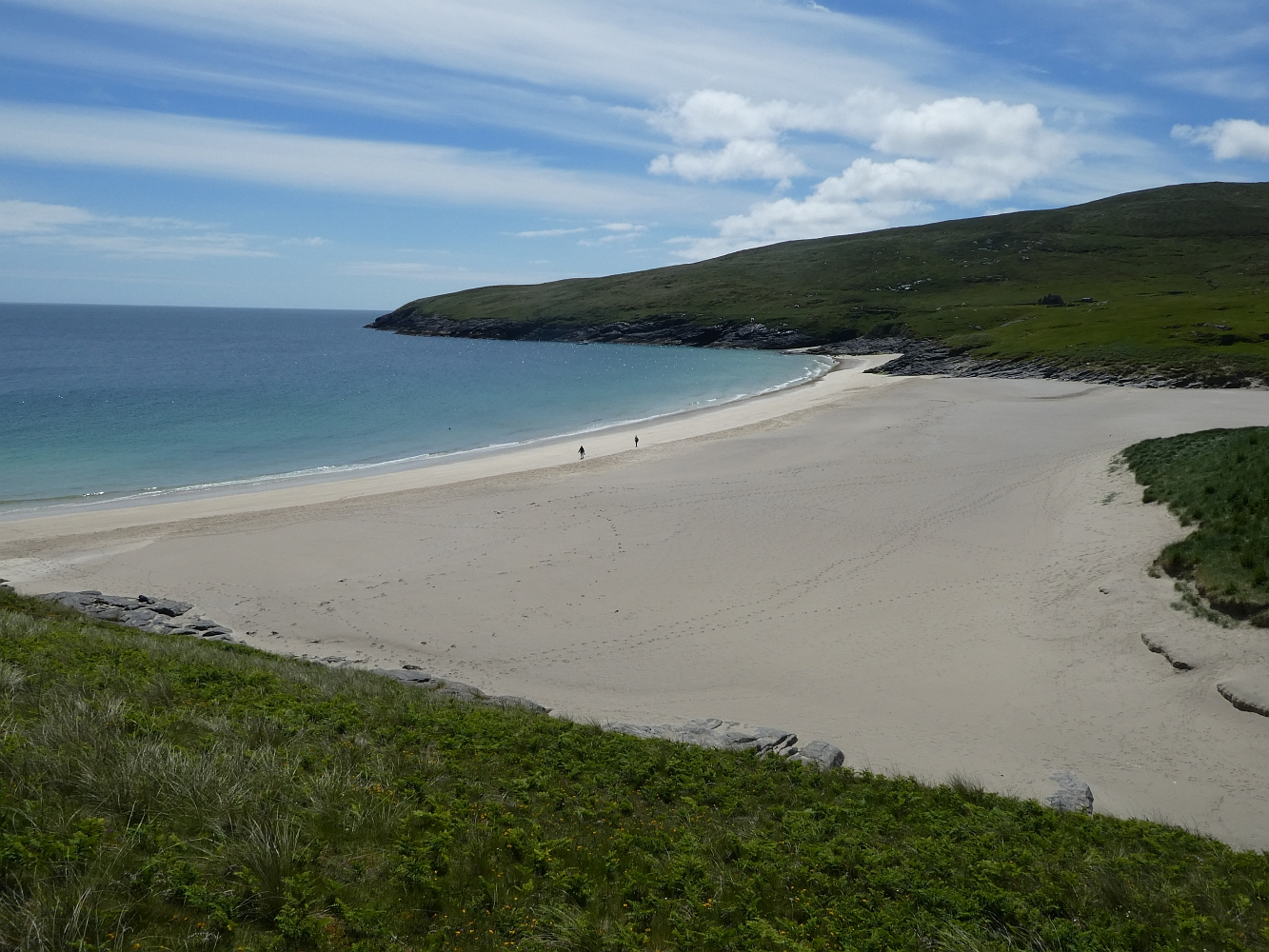
Mingulay - beach and bay

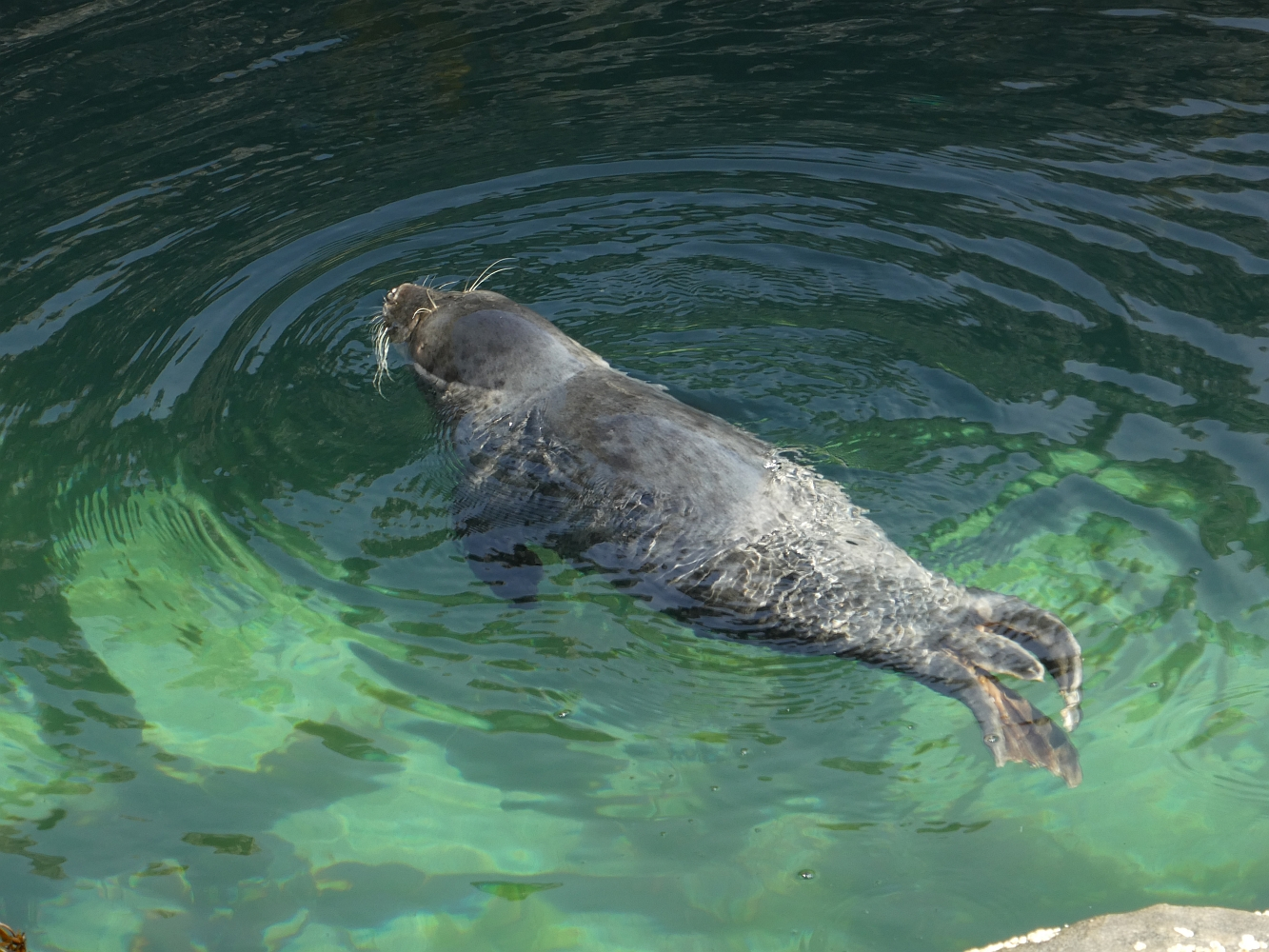
Mingulay - Swimming seal

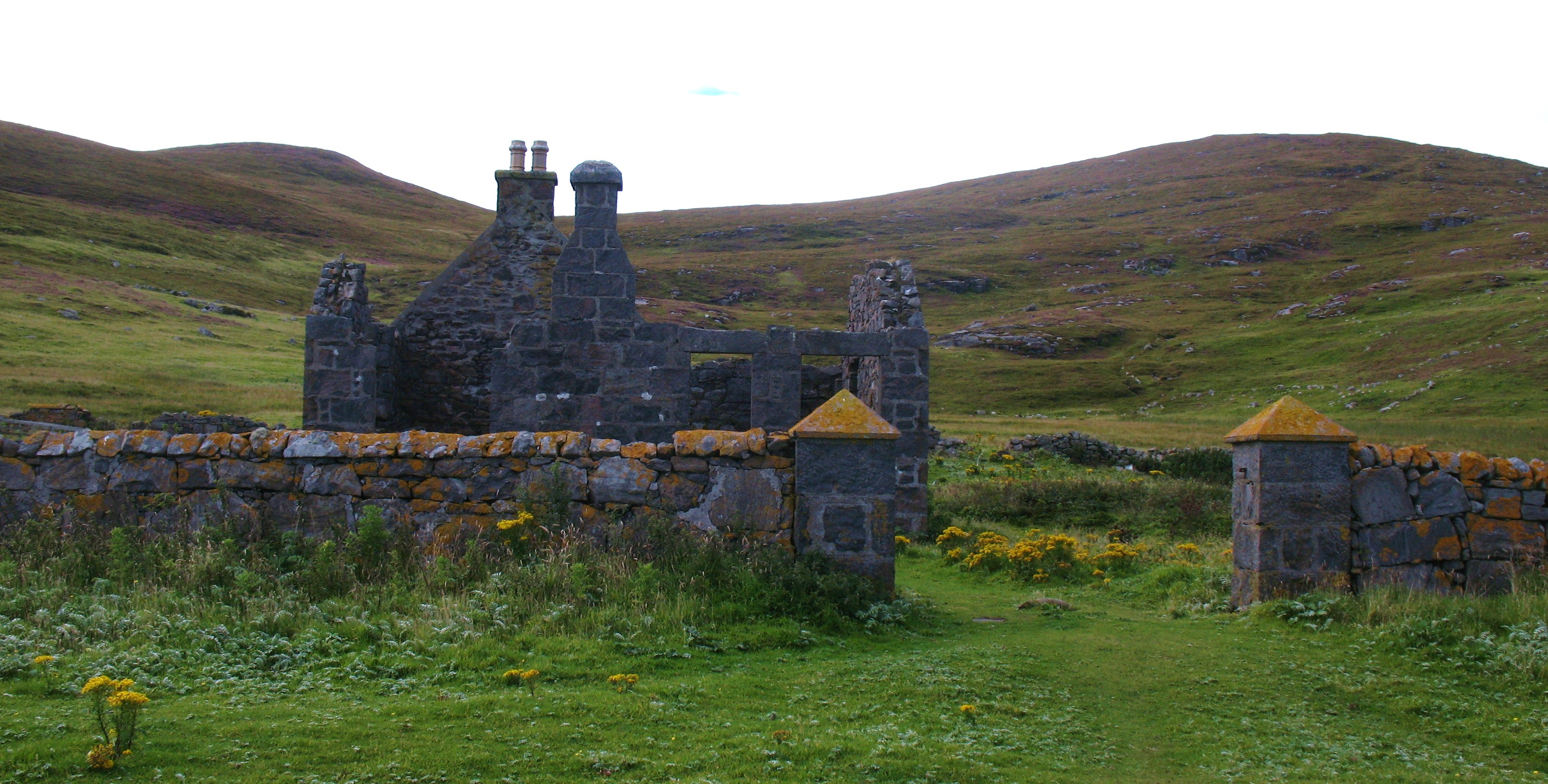
Old schoolhouse, Mingulay

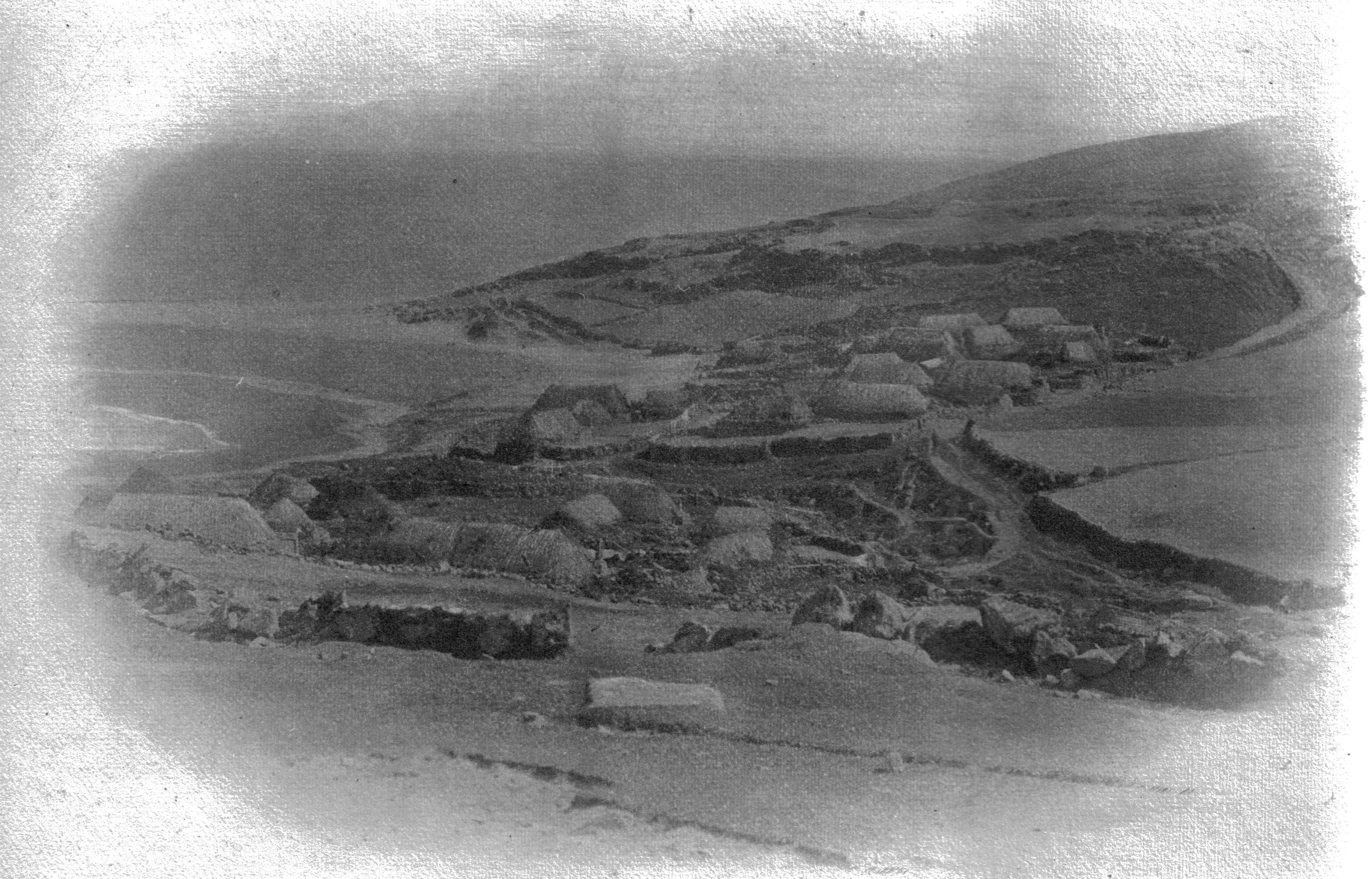
Mingulay village in 1888

== Death and legacy ==
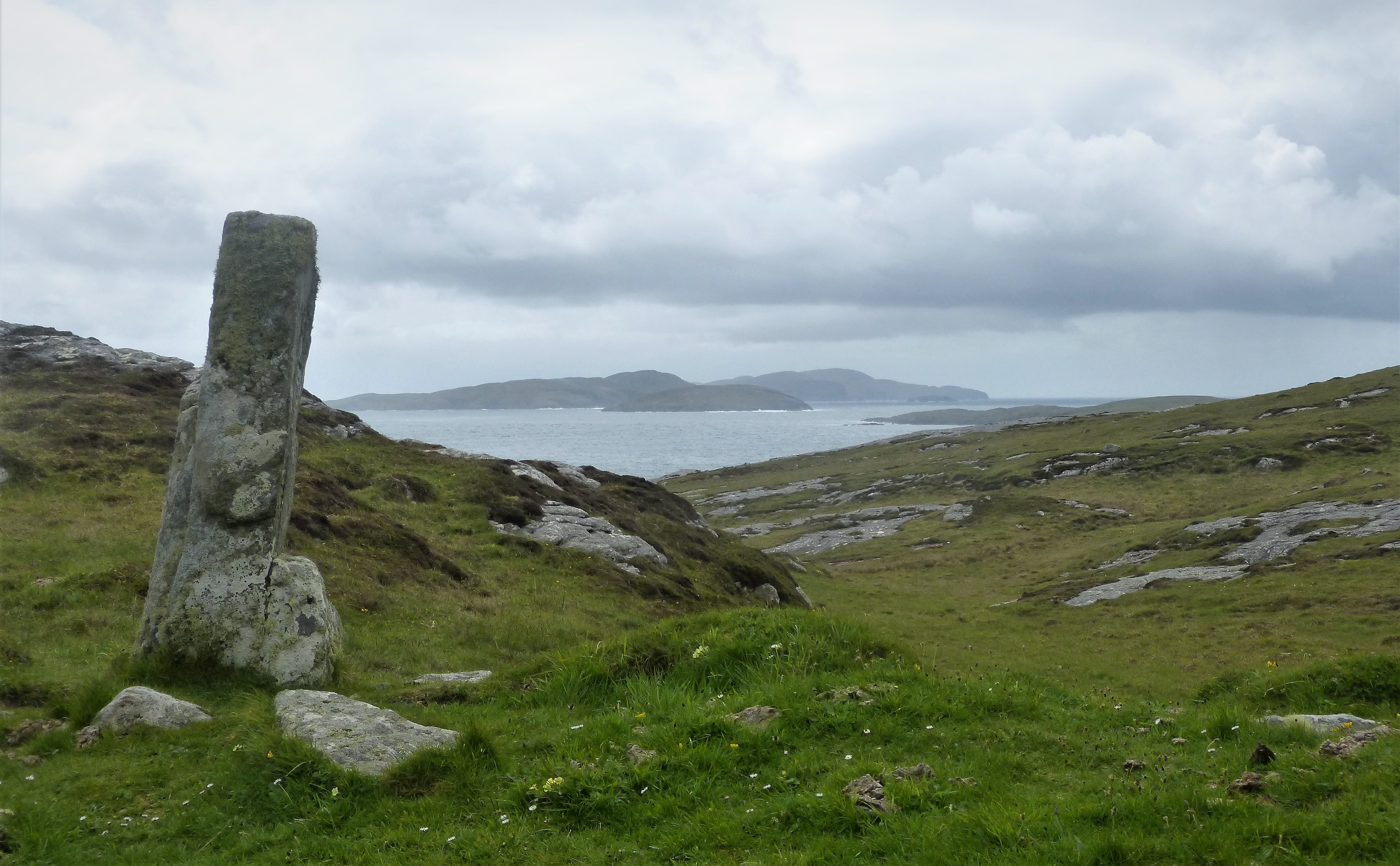
Standing Stone, Vatersay

Nan Mackinnon died on Vatersay on 24 June 1982, aged 79. The population of Vatersay had diminished to about 100 by the time of her death. She was also the last link with the songs and folklore of the island of Mingulay which had had a population of 135 in 1901 before being absolutely deserted only a decade later in 1912.

Francis Collinson, Honorary Research Fellow at the University of Edinburgh described her voice as possessing something unique:

"The singing of Nan Mackinnon has a strangeness about it even to the person with a wide experience of Gaelic folk-singing. One might say facilely of it that it is “out of this world”. It is the singing of a person who lives, and sings for her own amusement, within the confines of her own family circle, in the midst of a small island community which itself chooses to enjoy a with drawn existence. Her singing, which is the legacy of her mother, has therefore preserved in a unspoiled manner the way of singing of that older island community in which her mother lived the greater part of her life... it is in her quite remarkable repertoire of traditional songs that the chief interest lies; for these embrace an almost complete cross-section of the whole Gaelic song-culture, and include examples of every song-type (except, curiously, the Ossianic lays) from great elegiac songs to the lightest of puirt-a-beul".

James Ross of the School of Scottish Studies attempted to sum up Mackinnon's significance as a tradition-bearer when he said:

"Nan is the type of person that the folklore and folk-song collectors dream about. There is absolutely no trace of 'memory effect' as she responds to queries … Her answers are always a direct affirmative or negative, usually … the former. She never has to search her mind, and this, together with her unstinting co-operation, endless patience and subtle sense of humour, made the work of collecting a joy."

— James Ross, Tobar an Dualchais.
