= Gilbert Hackforth-Jones =

British writer (1900–1982)

Frank Gilbert Hackforth-Jones
- Born: 1900
- Died: 1982 (aged 81–82)
- Military career
- Allegiance: United Kingdom
- Branch: Royal Navy
- Service years: 1914–1936
- Rank: Commander
- Conflicts: World War I
- Other work: Author

Commander Frank Gilbert Hackforth-Jones R.N. (1900–1982) was a British writer of the mid 20th century. His writings reflected his own love and experience of the sea and sailing. He was the author of several novels and books for children and also wrote for BBC radio, the stage and cinema.

== Early life ==
Hackforth-Jones was born at the end of the Victorian era in 1900, entering Osborne Naval College as a cadet in 1914.

== Military career ==
He saw active service in World War I in as a midshipman in the battleship Emperor of India before transferring to submarines in 1920. He became the commander of four submarines before his retirement in 1936.

During World War II Hackforth-Jones was recalled to the Admiralty, serving in the Technical Branch. His novel Fish Out of Water (1954), is informed by his experiences in Birmingham in the early years of this war. It concerns a technical officer battling against indifference, ignorance and sabotage in his efforts to ensure the efficient production of munitions in the war effort.

In Yellow Peril (1972), Hackforth-Jones re-worked a short story that first appeared in Sixteen Bells (1946) into a full-length novel.

== Bibliography ==
One-One-One, (short stories), Rough Passage, No Less Renowned, (1939 short stories), Submarine Flotilla (1940), Submarine Alone (1943), The Price was High (1946), Sixteen Bells, (1946: short stories) The Questing Hound (1947), The Greatest Fool (1948), The Worst Enemy (1950), Dangerous Trade (1952), The Sole Survivor (1953), Fish Out of Water (1954), Death of an Admiral (1956), Hurricane Harbour (1958), Life on the Ocean Wave (1960), Crack of Doom (1961), Danger Below (1963), Storm in Harbour(1965), I am the Captain (1963), One Man's Wars (1964), The Stern Chase (1966), Warriors' Playtime (1967), Fight to a Finish (1968), Security Risk (1970), Yellow Peril (1972), Rough Passage (1971),

=== Paul Dexter Stories ===
1. Chinese Poison (1969), 2. All Stations to Malta (1971), 3. An Explosive Situation (1973), 4. Shadow of the Rock (1973), 5. Second-in-Command (1974), 6. Redoubtable Dexter (1975), 7. Dexter at War (1976).

=== Children's Stories ===
1. The Green Sailors (1951), 2. The Green Sailors on Holiday (1952), 3. Green Sailors, Ahoy! (1953), 4. Green Sailors, Beware (1954), 5. Green Sailors and Blue Water (1955), 6. Green Sailors and Fair Winds (1956), 7. Green Sailors to Gibraltar (1957), 8. Green Sailors in the Caribbean (1958), 9. Green Sailors in the Galapagos (1960), 10. Green Sailors in the South Seas (1961).

=== Non-Fiction ===
Come Sailing!, True Story of Submarines, Life in the Navy Today, Boys' Book of Sailing, Sailing.

=== Plays ===
(co-written with his wife Margaret Hackforth-Jones) Sweethearts and Wives (1952), The Policeman and the Lady (1955), Eight Points for the Admiral (1963).

=== Screenplay ===
The Baby and the Battleship (co-author).
