= Erich Welter =

German journalist (1900–1982)

- Born: 30 June 1900; Strasbourg, German Empire
- Died: 10 June 1982 (aged 81); Frankfurt, West Germany
- Known for: Editor Frankfurter Allgemeine Zeitung (1949-1980)

Erich Welter (30 June 1900, Strasbourg - 10 June 1982, Frankfurt) was a German economist and the founding editor of the Frankfurter Allgemeine Zeitung from November 1949.

Welter was a professor of economics at the University of Mainz between 1946 and 1973.

== Awards ==
- 1975 Large Federal Cross of Merit with a star
- 1978 Ludwig Erhard Medal for services to the social market economy
- 1981 plaque of honor from the city of Frankfurt am Main
